= List of comedy films of the 2010s =

A list of comedy films in the 2010s.

== By year ==
=== 2010 ===
Title	Director	Cast	Country	Notes
The Back-up Plan	Alan Poul	Jennifer Lopez, Alex O'Loughlin, Eric Christian Olsen	United States	Romantic Comedy
Barney's Version	Richard J. Lewis	Paul Giamatti, Dustin Hoffman, Rosamund Pike	Canada; Italy	Comedy-Drama
Big Tits Zombie	Takao Nakano	Sola Aoi, Risa Kasumi, Mari Samurai	Japan	Horror Comedy
Blood Junkie	Drew Rosas	Nick Sommer, Mike Johnson, Sarah Luther	United States	Horror comedy
The Bounty Hunter	Andy Tennant	Jennifer Aniston, Gerard Butler, Jason Sudeikis Giovanni Perez	United States	
Burke and Hare	John Landis	Simon Pegg, Andy Serkis, Isla Fisher	United Kingdom	
Cannonball Wedlock	Koji Maeda	Yuriko Yoshitaka, Kenta Hamano, Ryo Kase	Japan	Romantic comedy
Casino Jack	George Hickenlooper	Kevin Spacey, Barry Pepper, Jon Lovitz	Canada; United States	Crime Comedy-Drama
Cemetery Junction	Ricky Gervais, Stephen Merchant	Christian Cooke, Felicity Jones, Tom Hughes	United Kingdom	Comedy-Drama
The Clink of Ice	Bertrand Blier	Jean Dujardin, Albert Dupontel	France	
Cop Out	Kevin Smith	Bruce Willis, Tracy Morgan, Seann William Scott	United States	
Cyrano Agency	Kim Hyun-seok	Uhm Tae-woong, Lee Min-jung, Choi Daniel	South Korea	
Cyrus	Jay Duplass, Mark Duplass	John C. Reilly, Jonah Hill, Marisa Tomei, Catherine Keener	United States	Comedy-Drama
Date Night	Shawn Levy	Steve Carell, Tina Fey, Mark Wahlberg	United States	
Death at a Funeral	Neil LaBute	Keith David, Loretta Devine, Peter Dinklage	United States	
Despicable Me	Chris Renaud, Pierre Coffin	Steve Carell, Jason Segel, Russell Brand	United States	Family-oriented comedy
Diary of a Wimpy Kid	Thor Freudenthal	Zachary Gordon, Robert Capron, Rachael Harris	United States	Family-oriented comedy
Dinner for Schmucks	Jay Roach	Steve Carell, Paul Rudd, Zach Galifianakis	United States	
The Drummond Will	Alan Butterworth	Mark Oosterveen, Phillip James	United Kingdom	
Due Date	Todd Phillips	Robert Downey Jr., Zach Galifianakis, Jamie Foxx	United States	
Easy A	Will Gluck	Emma Stone, Penn Badgley, Amanda Bynes	United States	
The Extra Man	Shari Springer Berman, Robert Pulcini	Paul Dano, Kevin Kline, Katie Holmes	United States	
Flipped	Rob Reiner	Callan McAuliffe, Madeline Carroll, Rebecca De Mornay	United States	
Four Lions	Chris Morris	Riz Ahmed, Arsher Ali, Nigel Lindsay	United Kingdom	
Foxy Festival	Lee Hae-young	Shin Ha-kyun, Uhm Ji-won, Shim Hye-jin	South Korea	
FUBAR 2	Michael Dowse	Dave Lawrence, Paul Spence, Andrew Sparacino	Canada	
Furry Vengeance	Roger Kumble	Brendan Fraser, Brooke Shields, Ken Jeong	United States	Family-oriented comedy
Gallants	Derek Kwok, Clement Cheng	Wong You-nam, Bruce Leung, Chen Kuan-Tai	Hong Kong	Action comedy
Get Him to the Greek	Nick Stoller	Jonah Hill, Russell Brand, Rose Byrne	United States	
Going the Distance	Nanette Burstein	Drew Barrymore, Justin Long, Charlie Day	United States	
Greenberg	Noah Baumbach	Ben Stiller, Greta Gerwig, Rhys Ifans	United States	Comedy-Drama
Griff the Invisible	Leon Ford	Ryan Kwanten, Maeve Dermody, Marshall Napier	Australia	Comedy-Drama
Grown Ups	Dennis Dugan	Adam Sandler, Kevin James, Chris Rock, David Spade, Rob Schneider	United States	
Gulliver's Travels	Rob Letterman	Jack Black, Jason Segel, Emily Blunt	United States	
Gunless	William Phillips	Paul Gross, Sienna Guillory, Dustin Milligan	Canada	Western Comedy
Hahaha	Hong Sang-soo	Kim Sang-kyung, Yoo Jun-sang, Moon So-ri	South Korea	
Happythankyoumoreplease	Josh Radnor	Malin Akerman, Bram Barouh	United States	
Hatchet II	Adam Green	Kane Hodder, Danielle Harris, Tony Todd	United States	Horror Comedy
Heartbreaker	Pascal Chaumeil	Romain Duris, Vanessa Paradis, Julie Ferrier	France	
Hello Stranger	Banjong Pisanthanakun	Chantavit Dhanasevi, Nuengthida Sophon, Varathaya Nilkooha	Thailand	Romantic Comedy
Here Comes the Bride	Chris Martinez	Eugene Domingo, John Lapus, Tuesday Vargas	Philippines	
Hesher	Spencer Susser	Joseph Gordon-Levitt, Rainn Wilson, Natalie Portman	United States	Dark Comedy-Drama
Hospitalité	Koji Fukada	Kenji Yamauchi, Kiki Sugino, Kanji Furutachi	Japan	
Hot Tub Time Machine	Steve Pink	John Cusack, Rob Corddry, Craig Robinson	United States	
How Do You Know	James L. Brooks	Reese Witherspoon, Paul Rudd, Owen Wilson	United States	Romantic Comedy
It's Kind of a Funny Story	Ryan Fleck, Anna Boden	Keir Gilchrist, Zach Galifianakis, Emma Roberts	United States	Comedy-Drama
Jack Goes Boating	Philip Seymour Hoffman	Philip Seymour Hoffman, Amy Ryan, Amy Ryan	United States	Comedy-Drama
Jackass 3D	Jeff Tremaine	Johnny Knoxville, Bam Margera, Ryan Dunn	United States	
Just Call Me Nobody	Kevin Chu	Xiao Shen Yang, Kelly Lin, Banny Chen	Taiwan; China	
Just Wright	Sanaa Hamri	Common, Queen Latifah, Paula Patton	United States	Romantic comedy
Kaboom	Gregg Araki	Thomas Dekker, Haley Bennett, Chris Zylka	United States	
The Kids Are All Right	Lisa Cholodenko	Annette Bening, Julianne Moore, Mark Ruffalo	France; United States	Comedy-Drama
Kill Me Please	Olias Barco		Belgium	
Killers	Robert Luketic	Ashton Kutcher, Katherine Heigl, Tom Selleck	United States	Action Comedy
Knight and Day	James Mangold	Tom Cruise, Cameron Diaz, Peter Sarsgaard	United States	Action Comedy
Lapland Odyssey	Dome Karukoski	Timo Lavikainen, Pamela Tola, Kari Ketonen	Finland; Sweden; Ireland	
The Last Circus	Álex de la Iglesia	Carlos Areces, Antonio de la Torre, Carolina Bang	France; Spain	
Let the Bullets Fly	Jiang Wen	Chow Yun-Fat, Jiang Wen, Ge You	China; Hong Kong	
Letters to Juliet	Gary Winick	Amanda Seyfried, Christopher Egan, Gael García Bernal	United States	Romantic dramedy
Life as We Know It	Greg Berlanti	Katherine Heigl, Josh Duhamel, Josh Lucas	United States	Comedy-Drama
Little Big Soldier	Sheng Ding	Jackie Chan, Wang Lee Hom, Du Yuming	China; Hong Kong	Action Comedy
Little Fockers	Paul Weitz	Robert De Niro, Ben Stiller, Owen Wilson	United States	
Little White Lies	Guillaume Canet	François Cluzet, Marion Cotillard, Benoît Magimel	France	Comedy drama
Loose Cannons	Ferzan Özpetek	Riccardo Scamarcio	Italy	
Lottery Ticket	Erik White	Bow Wow, Brandon T. Jackson, Naturi Naughton	United States	
Love & Other Drugs	Edward Zwick	Jake Gyllenhaal, Anne Hathaway, Oliver Platt	United States	Comedy-Drama
Love in a Puff	Pang Ho-cheung	Miriam Yeung, Shawn Yue	Hong Kong	Romantic comedy
Love Scenario	Shoji Kokami	Kyoko Fukada, Ryoko Yoshizawa, Kippei Shiina	Japan	Romantic comedy
MacGruber	Jorma Taccone	Will Forte, Kristen Wiig, Ryan Phillippe	United States	
Megamind	Tom McGrath	Will Ferrell (Megamind), Brad Pitt (Metro Man), Tina Fey (Roxanne Ritchi)	United States	Family-oriented action comedy
Middle Men	George Gallo	Luke Wilson, Giovanni Ribisi, Gabriel Macht	United States	
Morning Glory	Roger Michell	Harrison Ford, Rachel McAdams, Diane Keaton	United States	Comedy-Drama
Mr. Nice	Bernard Rose	Rhys Ifans, Chloë Sevigny, David Thewlis	United Kingdom	Crime comedy
My Dear Desperado	Kim Kwang-sik	Park Joong-hoon, Jung Yu-mi, Park Won-sang	South Korea	Romantic comedy
The Names of Love	Michel Leclerc	Jacques Gamblin, Sara Forestier, Zinedine Soualem	France	
Nanny McPhee and the Big Bang	Susanna White	Emma Thompson, Maggie Gyllenhaal, Rhys Ifans	United Kingdom; United States	Fantasy Comedy
Oki's Movie	Hong Sang-soo	Lee Sun-kyun, Moon Sung-keun, Jung Yu-mi	South Korea	Comedy drama
The Other Guys	Adam McKay	Will Ferrell, Mark Wahlberg, Eva Mendes	United States	
Our Family Wedding	Rick Famuyiwa	Forest Whitaker, America Ferrera, Carlos Mencia	United States	
Perfect Wedding	Barbara Wong	Miriam Yeung, Raymond Lam, Teresa Mo	Hong Kong	Romantic comedy
Petty Romance	Kim Joung-hoon	Choi Kang-hee, Lee Sun-kyun	South Korea	Romantic comedy
Piranha 3D	Alexandre Aja	Elisabeth Shue, Adam Scott, Jerry O'Connell	United States	Horror Comedy
Please Give	Nicole Holofcener	Catherine Keener, Oliver Platt, Amanda Peet	United States	
Potiche	François Ozon	Catherine Deneuve, Gérard Depardieu, Fabrice Luchini	France	
President's Day	Chris LaMartina	Bennie Mack McCoy IV, Lizzy Denning, Shawn C. Phillips	United States	Horror Comedy
Rare Exports	Jalmari Helander	Onni Tommita, Jorma Tommila, Per Christian Ellefsen	France; Finland; Sweden	
Red	Robert Schwentke	Bruce Willis, Morgan Freeman, John Malkovich	United States	Action Comedy
Rose War of Nana	Dai Xiaozhe	Xie Na, Lee Seung-hyeon, Jin Yitong	China	Romantic comedy
Rubber	Quentin Dupieux	Stephen Spinella, Jack Plotnick, Wings Hauser	France	
Scott Pilgrim vs. the World	Edgar Wright	Michael Cera, Mary Elizabeth Winstead, Kieran Culkin	United States; United Kingdom; Japan	
The Seaside Motel	Kentaro Moriya	Toma Ikuta, Kumiko Asō, Takayuki Yamada	Japan	
Sex and the City 2	Michael Patrick King	Sarah Jessica Parker, Kim Cattrall, Cynthia Nixon	United States	Comedy-Drama
She's Out of My League	Jim Field Smith	Jay Baruchel, Alice Eve, T. J. Miller	United States	
Shrek Forever After	Mike Mitchell	Mike Myers, Eddie Murphy, Cameron Diaz	United States	Family-oriented comedy
Single Man	Hao Jie	Yang Zhenjun, Du Tianguang, Liang Yousheng	China	
The Sorcerer's Apprentice	Jon Turteltaub	Nicolas Cage, Jay Baruchel, Alfred Molina	United States	Adventure comedy
The Spy Next Door	Brian Levant	Jackie Chan, Amber Valletta, Madeline Carroll	United States	
Submarine	Richard Ayoade	Craig Roberts, Yasmin Paige, Sally Hawkins	United Kingdom	Comedy-Drama
Super	James Gunn	Rainn Wilson, Elliot Page, Liv Tyler	United Kingdom; United States	
Super Player	Niu Chaoyang	Sun Xing, Xie Na, Vincent Chiao	China	
Swinging with the Finkels	Jonathan Newman	Martin Freeman, Mandy Moore, Jonathan Silverman	United Kingdom	
The Switch	Will Speck, Josh Gordon	Jennifer Aniston, Jason Bateman, Patrick Wilson	United States	
Tamara Drewe	Stephen Frears	Gemma Arterton, Roger Allam, Bill Camp	United Kingdom	Comedy-Drama
Tiny Furniture	Lena Dunham	Lena Dunham, Laurie Simmons, Grace Dunham	United States	Comedy-Drama
Toy Story 3	Lee Unkrich	Tom Hanks (Woody), Tim Allen (Buzz Lightyear), Joan Cusack (Jessie)	United States	Family-oriented comedy
The Trip	Michael Winterbottom	Steve Coogan, Rob Brydon, Claire Keelan	United Kingdom	
Tucker & Dale vs. Evil	Eli Craig	Tyler Labine, Alan Tudyk, Katrina Bowden	Canada; United States	
Valentine's Day	Garry Marshall	Julia Roberts, Emma Roberts, Anne Hathaway	United States	Romantic comedy
Vampires Suck	Jason Friedberg, Aaron Seltzer	Matt Lanter, Chris Riggi, Ken Jeong	United States	
Winter Vacation	Lee Hong-chi	Bai Jungjie, Zhang Naqi	China	
Yogi Bear	Eric Brevig	Dan Aykroyd, Justin Timberlake, Tom Cavanagh, T. J. Miller, Anna Faris	United States	Family-oriented comedy
You Again	Andy Fickman	Kristen Bell, Jamie Lee Curtis, Sigourney Weaver	United States	
You Will Meet a Tall Dark Stranger	Woody Allen	Antonio Banderas, Josh Brolin, Anthony Hopkins	Spain; United States; United Kingdom	Romantic Comedy
Yuriko's Aroma	Kōta Yoshida	Noriko Eguchi, Shōta Sometani, Saori Hara	Japan	Erotic Comedy-Drama

=== 2011 ===
Title	Director	Cast	Country	Notes
30 Minutes or Less	Ruben Fleischer	Jesse Eisenberg, Danny McBride, Aziz Ansari	United States	
The 33D Invader	Cash Chin	Macy Wu, Chen Chun-yan, Akiho Yoshizawa	Hong Kong	
50/50	Jonathan Levine	Joseph Gordon-Levitt, Seth Rogen, Anna Kendrick	United States	Comedy-Drama
Arthur	Mike Mills	Russell Brand, Helen Mirren, Jennifer Garner, Greta Gerwig	United States	
Les aventures de Philibert, Capitaine Puceau	Sylvain Fusée	Jérémie Renier	France	
Bad Teacher	Jake Kasdan	Cameron Diaz, Justin Timberlake, Jason Segel	United States	
Bernie	Richard Linklater	Jack Black, Matthew McConaughey, Shirley MacLaine	United States	
Beach Spike	Tony Tang	Chrissie Chau, Theresa Fu, Jessica C	Hong Kong	
Beginners	Mike Mills	Ewan McGregor, Christopher Plummer, Mélanie Laurent	United States	Comedy-Drama
Big Mommas: Like Father, Like Son	John Whitesell	Martin Lawrence, Brandon T. Jackson, Jessica Lucas	United States	
The Big Year	David Frankel	Steve Martin, Jack Black, Owen Wilson	United States	
Bloody Bloody Bible Camp	Vito Trabucco	Reggie Bannister, Tim Sullivan, Ron Jeremy	United States	Horror Comedy
Bridesmaids	Paul Feig	Kristen Wiig, Maya Rudolph, Rose Byrne	United States	
Blubberella	Uwe Boll		Germany	
Bucky Larson: Born to Be a Star	Tom Brady	Nick Swardson, Christina Ricci, Don Johnson	United States	
Carnage	Roman Polanski	Jodie Foster, Kate Winslet, Christoph Waltz	France; Germany; Poland; Spain; United States	
Cars 2	John Lasseter	Owen Wilson, Larry the Cable Guy, Michael Caine	United States	Family-oriented comedy
Diary of a Wimpy Kid: Rodrick Rules	David Bowers	Zachary Gordon, Devon Bostick, Rachael Harris, Robert Capron, Steve Zahn	United States	
Cedar Rapids	Miguel Arteta	Ed Helms, John C. Reilly, Anne Heche	United States	
The Change-Up	David Dobkin	Ryan Reynolds, Jason Bateman, Leslie Mann	United States	
Couples	Jeong Yong-ki	Kim Joo-hyuk, Lee Yoon-ji, Lee Si-young	South Korea	
Crazy, Stupid, Love.	John Requa, Glenn Ficarra	Steve Carell, Ryan Gosling, Julianne Moore	United States	Romantic Comedy
Deadball	Yudai Yamaguchi	Tak Sakaguchi, Mari Hoshino, Miho Ninagawa	Japan	
Delhi Belly	Abhiney Deo	Imran Khan, Kunal Roy Kapoor, Vir Das	India	
The Descendants	Alexander Payne	George Clooney, Shailene Woodley, Amara Miller	United States	Comedy-Drama
Don't Go Breaking My Heart	Johnnie To, Wai Ka-fai	Louis Koo, Daniel Wu, Gao Yuanyuan	Hong Kong; China	
The Dilemma	Ron Howard	Vince Vaughn, Kevin James, Winona Ryder, Jennifer Connelly	United States	Comedy-Drama
Dylan Dog: Dead of Night	Kevin Munroe	Brandon Routh, Anita Briem, Sam Huntington	United States	Horror comedy
Flypaper	Rob Minkoff	Patrick Dempsey, Ashley Judd, Tim Blake Nelson	United States	
Friends with Benefits	Will Gluck	Justin Timberlake, Mila Kunis, Patricia Clarkson	United States	Romantic Comedy
Fright Night	Craig Gillespie	Anton Yelchin, Colin Farrell, Toni Collette	United States	Comedy horror
From Prada to Nada	Angel Gracia	Camilla Belle, Alexa Vega, Wilmer Valderrama	Mexico; United States	Comedy-Drama
Gnomeo & Juliet	Kelly Asbury	James McAvoy, Emily Blunt, Ashley Jensen	United Kingdom	Animated Film
God Bless America	Bobcat Goldthwait	Joel Murray, Tara Lynne Barr, Mackenzie Brooke Smith	United States	Black Comedy
A Good Old Fashioned Orgy	Alex Gregory, Peter Huyck	Jason Sudeikis, Leslie Bibb, Lake Bell	United States	
The Green Hornet	Michel Gondry	Seth Rogen, Jay Chou, Cameron Diaz	United States	
Goon	Michael Dowse	Seann William Scott, Liev Schreiber, Jay Baruchel	Canada	
The Guard	John Michael McDonagh	Brendan Gleeson, Don Cheadle, Rory Keenan	Ireland	
Hall Pass	Bobby Farrelly, Peter Farrelly	Owen Wilson, Jason Sudeikis, Jenna Fischer	United States	
The Hangover Part II	Todd Phillips	Bradley Cooper, Ed Helms, Zach Galifianakis	United States	
Le Havre	Aki Kaurismäki	André Wilms, Kati Outinen, Jean-Pierre Darroussin	France; Germany; Finland	Comedy-Drama
Hoodwinked Too! Hood vs. Evil	Mike Disa	Hayden Panettiere, Patrick Warburton, Glenn Close, Joan Cusack, Bill Hader, Amy Poehler, Martin Short, Andy Dick	United States	Animated Film
Hop	Tim Hill	Russell Brand, James Marsden, Kaley Cuoco, Hank Azaria, Hugh Laurie	United States	
Horrible Bosses	Seth Gordon	Jason Bateman, Jason Sudeikis, Charlie Day	United States	
The Inbetweeners Movie	Ben Palmer	Simon Bird, Joe Thomas, James Buckley	United Kingdom	
Jack and Jill	Dennis Dugan	Adam Sandler, Katie Holmes, Al Pacino	United States	
Johnny English Reborn	Oliver Parker	Rowan Atkinson, Gillian Anderson, Rosamund Pike	United Kingdom	
Judy Moody and the Not Bummer Summer	John Schultz	Jordana Beatty, Heather Graham, Parris Mosteller, Janet Varney, Kristoffer Winters	United States	
Jumping the Broom	Salim Akil	Angela Bassett, Paula Patton, Laz Alonso	Canada; United States	Comedy-Drama
Just Go With It	Dennis Dugan	Adam Sandler, Jennifer Aniston, Nicole Kidman	United States	
Kung Fu Panda 2	Jennifer Yuh Nelson	Jack Black, Dustin Hoffman, Angelina Jolie, Gary Oldman	United States	Family-oriented comedy
Larry Crowne	Tom Hanks	Tom Hanks, Julia Roberts, Bryan Cranston	United States	Romantic Comedy
Love in Space	Wing Shya, Tony Chan	Aaron Kwok, Eason Chan, Rene Liu	Hong Kong; China; United States	
Love Is Not Blind	Teng Huatao	Wen Zhang, Bai Baihe, Guo Jingfei	China	Romantic comedy
Love, Wedding, Marriage	Dermot Mulroney	Mandy Moore, Kellan Lutz, James Brolin	United States	
Madea's Big Happy Family	Tyler Perry	Isaiah Mustafa, Loretta Devine, Bow Wow	United States	Comedy-Drama
Mars Needs Moms	Simon Wells	Seth Green, Joan Cusack, Dan Fogler, Elisabeth Harnois, Mindy Sterling, Kevin Cahoon, Dee Bradley Baker, Tom Everett Scott	United States	Animated Sci-fi Adventure Comedy
Mean Girls 2	Melanie Mayron	Meaghan Jette Martin, Jennifer Stone, Maiara Walsh	United States	
Midnight in Paris	Woody Allen	Owen Wilson, Marion Cotillard, Rachel McAdams	Spain; United States	
Monte Carlo	Thomas Bezucha	Selena Gomez, Leighton Meester, Katie Cassidy	United States	
Mr. Popper's Penguins	Mark S. Waters	Jim Carrey, Carla Gugino, Angela Lansbury	United States	
The Muppets	James Bobin	Steve Whitmire, Eric Jacobson, Dave Goelz, Bill Barretta, David Rudman, Matt Vogel, Peter Linz, Jason Segel, Amy Adams, Chris Cooper	United States	
New Year's Eve	Garry Marshall	Michelle Pfeiffer, Zac Efron	United States	Romantic Comedy
No Strings Attached	Ivan Reitman	Natalie Portman, Ashton Kutcher, Kevin Kline	United States	Romantic Comedy
Nothing to Declare	Dany Boon		France	
Our Idiot Brother	Jesse Peretz	Paul Rudd, Elizabeth Banks, Zooey Deschanel, Shirley Knight	United States	Comedy-Drama
Paul	Greg Mottola	Seth Rogen, Simon Pegg, Nick Frost, Kristen Wiig, Jason Bateman, Bill Hader	United Kingdom; United States	
Prom	Joe Nussbaum	Aimee Teegarden, Thomas McDonell, De'Vaughn Nixon	United States	
Quick	Jo Bum-gu	Lee Min-ki, Kang Ye-won, Kim In-kwon	South Korea	Action comedy
Rio	Carlos Saldanha	Anne Hathaway, Jesse Eisenberg, Jemaine Clement, Leslie Mann, George Lopez, Jamie Foxx	United States	Animated Film
Salmon Fishing in the Yemen	Lasse Hallström	Ewan McGregor, Emily Blunt, Kristin Scott Thomas	United Kingdom	
Scream 4	Wes Craven	Neve Campbell, Courteney Cox, David Arquette	United States	Horror Comedy
Service Entrance	Philippe le Guay	Fabrice Luchini, Sandrine Kiberlain, Natalia Verbeke	France	
The Sitter	David Gordon Green	Jonah Hill, Max Records, Landry Bender, Kevin Hernandez, Erin Daniels, J.B. Smoove	United States	
Slapstick Brothers	Hiroshi Shinagawa	Ryuta Sato, Yusuke Kamiji, Satomi Ishihara	Japan	
The Smurfs	Raja Gosnell	Jonathan Winters, Katy Perry, Anton Yelchin, Fred Armisen, George Lopez, Tom Kane, Hank Azaria, Frank Welker, Neil Patrick Harris, Jayma Mays, Sofia Vergara	United States	
Something Borrowed	Luke Greenfield	Kate Hudson, Ginnifer Goodwin, John Krasinski	United States	Romantic Comedy
Spy Kids: All the Time in the World	Robert Rodriguez	Jessica Alba, Joel McHale, Jeremy Piven	United States	Family-oriented comedy
Sunny	Kang Hyeong-cheol	Yoo Ho-jeong, Shim Eun-kyung, Jin Hee-kyung	South Korea	Comedy-Drama
Take Me Home Tonight	Michael Dowse	Topher Grace, Anna Faris, Dan Fogler	United States	Comedy-Drama
Terri	Azazel Jacobs	Jacob Wysocki, John C. Reilly, Bridger Zadina	United States	Comedy-Drama
Tous les soleils	Philippe Claudel		France	
Tower Heist	Brett Ratner	Ben Stiller, Eddie Murphy, Casey Affleck	United States	
A Very Harold & Kumar Christmas	Todd Strauss-Schulson	John Cho, Kal Penn, Paula Garcés, Danneel Harris, Tom Lennon, Danny Trejo Neil Patrick Harris	United States	
Win Win	Tom McCarthy	Paul Giamatti, Amy Ryan, Bobby Cannavale	United States	Comedy-Drama
Young Adult	Jason Reitman	Charlize Theron, Patton Oswalt, Patrick Wilson	United States	Comedy-Drama
Your Highness	David Gordon Green	Danny McBride, James Franco, Rasmus Hardiker	United States	
Zookeeper	Frank Coraci	Kevin James, Rosario Dawson, Leslie Bibb	United States	

=== 2012 ===
Title	Director	Cast	Country	Notes
8 Reels of Sewage	Jared Masters	Katja Glieson, Jacqueline Guzman Cereceres, Emily Pelz	United States	Action comedy
21 Jump Street	Phil Lord, Christopher Miller	Jonah Hill, Channing Tatum, Brie Larson	United States	
100 Bloody Acres	Cameron Caimes, Colin Caimes	Damon Herriman, Angus Sampson, Anna McGahan	Australia	Horror comedy
Ah Boys to Men	Jack Neo	Joshua Tan, Maxi Lim, Noah Yap	Singapore; Malaysia	
All About My Wife	Min Kyu-dong	Im Soo-jung, Lee Sun-kyun, Ryu Seung-ryong	South Korea	Romantic comedy
All's Well, Ends Well 2012	Chan Hing-kai, Janet Chun	Donnie Yen, Louis Koo, Sandra Ng	Hong Kong; China	
American Reunion	Hayden Schlossberg, Jon Hurwitz	Jason Biggs, Alyson Hannigan, Chris Klein	United States	
L'amour dure trois ans	Frédéric Beigbeder	Louise Bourgoin	France	
The Angels' Share	Ken Loach	Paul Brannigan, John Henshaw, Gary Maitland	Belgium; France; United Kingdom; Italy	Comedy drama
Any Questions for Ben?	Rob Sitch	Josh Lawson	Australia	
Diary of a Wimpy Kid: Dog Days	David Bowers	Zachary Gordon, Robert Capron, Devon Bostick, Rachael Harris, Steve Zahn	United States	
Behind the Camera: Why Mr. E Went to Hollywood	E J-yong	Youn Yuh-jung, E J-yong, Lee Joon-ik	South Korea	
Benvenuti al Nord	Luca Miniero		Italy	
The Campaign	Jay Roach	Will Ferrell, Zach Galifianakis, Jason Sudeikis	United States	
Capturing Dad	Ryota Nakano	Makiko Watanabe, Erisa Yanagi, Nanoka Matsubara	Japan	
Casa de Mi Padre	Matt Piedmont	Will Ferrell, Diego Luna, Pedro Armendáriz, Jr.	United States	
Chips	Yoshihiro Nakamura	Gaku Hamada, Fumino Kimura, Taiki Nakabayashi	Japan	
Ice Age: Continental Drift	Steve Martino; Michael Thurmeier	Ray Romano, John Leguizamo, Denis Leary, Nicki Minaj, Drake, Jennifer Lopez, Queen Latifah	United States	Animated adventure comedy
Cocktail	Homi Adajania	Saif Ali Khan, Deepika Padukone, Diana Penty	India	Romantic comedy
CZ12	Jackie Chan	Jackie Chan, Kwon Sang-woo, Liao Fan	Hong Kong; China	
Dark Shadows	Tim Burton	Johnny Depp, Michelle Pfeiffer, Helena Bonham Carter	United States	Horror comedy
Dead Before Dawn	April Mullen	Devon Bostick, Martha MacIsaac, Christopher Lloyd	Canada	Horror comedy
The Dictator	Larry Charles	Sacha Baron Cohen, Anna Faris, Ben Kingsley	United States	
Due West: Our Sex Journey	Mark Wu	Justin Cheung, Gregory Wong, Mark Wu	Hong Kong	
The Fierce Wife	Wang Pei-hua, Joseph Wang	Sonia Sui, James Wen, Chris Wang	Taiwan	
The Five-Year Engagement	Nicholas Stoller	Jason Segel, Emily Blunt, Chris Pratt, Alison Brie	United States	Romantic Comedy
Frankenweenie	Tim Burton		United States	Family-oriented comedy, fantasy comedy
Ghost Day	Thanit Jitnukul, Titipong Chaisati, Sorathep Vetwongsatip	Joey Boy	Thailand	Horror comedy
Grabbers	Jon Wright	Richard Coyle, Ruth Bradley, Russell Tovey	Ireland	Horror comedy
Hellbenders	J. T. Petty	Clancy Brown, Clifton Collins Jr., Andre Royo	United States	Horror comedy
Hollywood a GoGo	Jared Masters	Courtney Alvarez, Rose Marie Guess, Nicole Marie White	United States	Action comedy
The Great Magician	Derek Yee	Tony Leung Chiu-Wai, Lau Ching-wan, Zhou Xun	Hong Kong; China	
HOUBA! On the Trail of the Marsupilami	Alain Chabat	Jamel Debbouze, Alain Chabat, Lambert Wilson	Belgium; France	
Immaturi - Il viaggio	Paolo Genovese		Italy	
Iron Sky	Timo Vuorensola	Julia Dietze, Götz Otto, Christopher Kirby	Australia; Germany; Finland	
Istanbul, Here I Come!	Bernard Chauly	Lisa Surihani, Tomok, Beto Kusyairy	Malaysia	Romantic comedy
It's Such a Beautiful Day	Don Hertzfeldt		United States	Comedy-Drama
Jeff, Who Lives at Home	Jay Duplass, Mark Duplass	Jason Segel, Ed Helms, Susan Sarandon	United States	Comedy-Drama
Joyful Noise	Todd Graff	Queen Latifah, Dolly Parton, Keke Palmer	United States	Comedy-Drama
The Kirishima Thing	Daihachi Yoshida	Ryunosuke Kamiki, Ai Hashimoto, Masahiro Higashide	Japan	high school comedy-drama
Lost in Thailand	Xu Zheng	Xu Zheng, Wang Baoqiang, Huang Bo	China	
Love in the Buff	Pang Ho-cheung	Miriam Yeung, Shawn Yue, Xu Zheng	Hong Kong; China	
Madagascar 3: Europe's Most Wanted	Eric Darnell, Conrad Vernon, Tom McGrath	Ben Stiller, Chris Rock, David Schwimmer, Jada Pinkett Smith	United States	Family-oriented comedy
Magic Mike	Steven Soderbergh	Channing Tatum, Alex Pettyfer, Matthew Bomer	United States	Comedy-Drama
Men in Black 3	Barry Sonnenfeld	Will Smith, Tommy Lee Jones, Josh Brolin	United States	
Mirror Mirror	Tarsem Singh	Julia Roberts, Lily Collins, Armie Hammer	United States	Fantasy Comedy
Moonrise Kingdom	Wes Anderson	Jared Gilman, Kara Hayward, Bruce Willis	United States	Comedy-Drama
My Sassy Hubby	James Yuen	Ekin Cheng, Charlene Choi, Zhang Xinyi	Hong Kong	
One for the Money	Julie Anne Robinson	Katherine Heigl, Jason O'Mara, Daniel Sunjata	United States	
Paranorman	Sam Fell, Chris Butler		United States	Horror Comedy
The Pirates! In an Adventure with Scientists	Peter Lord	Hugh Grant, Martin Freeman, Imelda Staunton, David Tennant, Jeremy Piven, Salma Hayek, Russell Tovey, Lenny Henry, Brendan Gleeson, Ashley Jensen, Ben Whitehead	United Kingdom	Family-oriented comedy
The Players	Various	Jean Dujardin, Geraldine Nakache, Geraldine Nakache	France	
Project X	Nima Nourizadeh	Thomas Mann, Oliver Cooper, Jonathan Daniel Brown	United States	
Robo-G	Shinobu Yaguchi	Shigemitsu Suzuki, Yuriko Yoshitaka, Gaku Hamada	Japan	
Ruby Sparks	Jonathan Dayton, Valerie Faris	Paul Dano, Zoe Kazan, Elliott Gould	United States	Comedy-Drama
Sad Fairy Tale	Xu Zhengchao	Cecilia Liu, Hu Xia, Iola Xie	China; South Korea	Romantic Comedy
Seeking a Friend for the End of the World	Lorene Scafaria	Steve Carell, Keira Knightley, Connie Britton	United States	Comedy-Drama
Seven Psychopaths	Martin McDonagh	Colin Farrell, Christopher Walken, Sam Rockwell	United Kingdom	Comedy-Drama
Silver Linings Playbook	David O. Russell	Bradley Cooper, Jennifer Lawrence, Robert De Niro, Chris Tucker	United States	Romantic Comedy-Drama
The Soul of Bread	Sean Kao, Lin Chun-yang	Chen Han-tien, Michelle Chen, Anthony Neely	Taiwan	
Spring Breakers	Harmony Korine	James Franco, Selena Gomez, Vanessa Hudgens	United States	
Stitches	Conor McMahon	Ross Noble, Tommy Knight, Gemma-Leah Devereux	Ireland	Horror comedy
Syndicate	Jared Masters	Kerry Baker, Curtis Gwinn, Cosondra Sjostrom	United States	Action Comedy
Ted	Seth MacFarlane	Mark Wahlberg, Mila Kunis, Seth MacFarlane	United States	
Television	Mostofa Sarwar Farooki	Shahir Hudi Rumi, Chanchal Chowdhury, Nusrat Imrose Tisha	Bangladesh	
This Is 40	Judd Apatow	Leslie Mann, Paul Rudd, Albert Brooks	United States	Comedy-Drama
This Means War	McG	Reese Witherspoon, Chris Pine, Tom Hardy	United States	
The Three Stooges	Farrelly brothers	Chris Diamantopoulos, Will Sasso, Sean Hayes, Sofia Vergara, Jane Lynch	United States	
Tim and Eric's Billion Dollar Movie	Tim Heidecker, Eric Wareheim	Tim Heidecker, Eric Wareheim, Zach Galifianakis	United States	
To Rome with Love	Woody Allen	Alec Baldwin, Jesse Eisenberg, Woody Allen	Italy; United States	Romantic Comedy
Unpolitical Romance	Hsieh Chun-yi	Bryan Chang, Huang Lu, Akira Chen	Taiwan	Romantic comedy
Vulgaria	Pang Ho-cheung	Chapman To, Ronald Cheng, Dada Chen	Hong Kong	
Wanderlust	David Wain	Paul Rudd, Jennifer Aniston, Justin Theroux	United States	
When a Wolf Falls in Love with a Sheep	Hou Chi-jan	Kai Ko, Chien Man-shu, Tsai Chen-nan	Taiwan	
Wreck-It Ralph	Rich Moore		United States	Family-oriented comedy drama

=== 2013 ===
Title	Director	Cast	Country	Notes
20 ans d'écarte	David Moreau		France	
21 and Over	Scott Moore, Jon Lucas	Miles Teller, Skylar Astin, Justin Chon	United States	
21 Ways to Ruin a Marriage	Johanna Vuoksenmaa		Finland	
30 Nights of Paranormal Activity with the Devil Inside the Girl with the Dragon Tattoo	Craig Moss	Kathryn Fiore, Flip Schultz, Olivia Alexander	United States	
A Haunted House	Michael Tiddes	Marlon Wayans, Cedric the Entertainer, Essence Atkins	United States	
About Time	Richard Curtis	Domhnall Gleeson, Tom Hughes, Rachel McAdams	United Kingdom	Comedy-Drama
Alan Partridge: Alpha Papa	Declan Lowney	Steve Coogan	United Kingdom	
All Is Bright	Phil Morrison	Paul Giamatti, Paul Rudd, Sally Hawkins	United States	Comedy-Drama
Anchorman 2: The Legend Continues	Adam McKay	Will Ferrell, Christina Applegate, Paul Rudd, Steve Carell, David Koechner	United States	
Austenland	Jerusha Hess	Keri Russell, JJ Feild, Bret McKenzie	United Kingdom; United States	
Baggage Claim	David E. Talbert	Paula Patton, Derek Luke, Taye Diggs	United States	Romantic Comedy
Better and Better	Zhang Yibai, Xie Dongshen	Tony Leung Ka-fai, Wang Baoqiang, May Wang	China	Romantic comedy
The Big Wedding	Justin Zackham	Robert De Niro, Katherine Heigl, Diane Keaton, Amanda Seyfried	United States	
Clear History	Greg Mottola	Larry David, Bill Hader, Philip Baker Hall	United States	
Cloudy with a Chance of Meatballs 2	Cody Cameron, Kris Pearn	Bill Hader, Anna Faris, James Caan, Will Forte, Terry Crews, Andy Samberg, Kristen Schaal	United States	Family-oriented comedy
Computer Chess	Andrew Bujalski	Patrick Riester, Myles Paige, Gordon Kindlmann	United States	
The Croods	Kirk DeMicco, Chris Sanders	Emma Stone, Nicolas Cage, Ryan Reynolds, Catherine Keener, Cloris Leachman, Clark Duke	United States	Family-oriented comedy
David Loman	Chiu Li-kwan	Chu Ko-liang, Tony Yang, Amber Kuo	Taiwan	
Despicable Me 2	Pierre Coffin, Chris Renaud	Steve Carell, Kristen Wiig, Benjamin Bratt, Miranda Cosgrove, Elsie Fisher, Dana Gaier, Russell Brand	United States	Family-oriented comedy
Don Jon	Joseph Gordon-Levitt	Joseph Gordon-Levitt, Scarlett Johansson, Julianne Moore	United States	Comedy-Drama
Drinking Buddies	Joe Swanberg	Olivia Wilde, Jake Johnson, Anna Kendrick	United States	Comedy-Drama
Enough Said	Nicole Holofcener	Julia Louis-Dreyfus, James Gandolfini, Catherine Keener	United States	Comedy-Drama
Escape from Planet Earth	Cal Brunker		United States	Animated Film
The Family	Luc Beeson	Robert De Niro, Michelle Pfeiffer, Tommy Lee Jones	United States	Crime comedy
Fasten Your Seatbelt	Ha Jung-woo	Jung Kyung-ho, Han Seong-cheon, Kim Jae-hwa	South Korea	
Finding Mr. Right	Xue Xiaolu	Tang Wei, Wu Xiubo, Hai Qing	China; Hong Kong	Romantic comedy
Forever Love	Patrick Kong Lingchen	Guo Xiaoran, Gina Jin, Niu Qun	China; Hong Kong	Romantic comedy
Free Birds	Jimmy Hayward	Owen Wilson, Woody Harrelson, Amy Poehler	United States	Family-oriented comedy
Girl Most Likely	Shari Springer Berman, Robert Pulcini	Kristen Wiig, Annette Bening, Matt Dillon	United States	
Grown Ups 2	Dennis Dugan	Adam Sandler, Kevin James, Chris Rock, David Spade	United States	
Grudge Match	Peter Segal	Kevin Hart, Robert De Niro, Sylvester Stallone	United States	
The Hangover Part III	Todd Phillips	Bradley Cooper, Ed Helms, Zach Galifianakis, Ken Jeong	United States	
The Heat	Paul Feig	Sandra Bullock, Melissa McCarthy, Demián Bichir	United States	Action Comedy
How to Use Guys with Secret Tips	Lee Won-suk	Lee Si-young, Oh Jung-se, Park Yeong-gyu	South Korea	Romantic comedy
I Give It a Year	Dan Mazer	Rose Byrne, Rafe Spall, Anna Faris	United Kingdom	
Identity Thief	Seth Gordon	Jason Bateman, Melissa McCarthy, Jon Favreau	United States	
I'm So Excited	Pedro Almodóvar	Cecilia Roth, Lola Dueñas, Raúl Arévalo	Spain	
In a World...	Lake Bell	Lake Bell, Fred Melamed, Demetri Martin	United States	
The Incredible Burt Wonderstone	Don Scardino	Steve Carell, Olivia Wilde, Jim Carrey	United States	
The Internship	Shawn Levy	Vince Vaughn, Owen Wilson, Josh Gad	United States	
Jackass Presents: Bad Grandpa	Jeff Tremaine	Johnny Knoxville, Jackson Nicoll, Spike Jonze	United States	
John Dies at the End	Don Coscarelli	Chase Williamson, Rob Mayes, Paul Giamatti, Clancy Brown	United States	Horror comedy
Journey to the West: Conquering the Demons	Stephen Chow	Shu Qi, Wen Zhang, Huang Bo	China; Hong Kong	
The Kings of Summer	Jordan Vogt-Roberts	Nick Robinson, Gabriel Basso, Moisés Arias	United States	Comedy-Drama
Last Vegas	Jon Turteltaub	Michael Douglas, Robert De Niro, Morgan Freeman	United States	
Love Deposit	Qu Jiangtao	Xia Yu, Jessie Zhou, Jill Hsu	China	Romantic comedy
Monsters University	Dan Scanlon	Billy Crystal, John Goodman, Steve Buscemi, Peter Sohn, Joel Murray, Sean Hayes, Dave Foley, Charlie Day, Helen Mirren, Aubrey Plaza	United States	Family-oriented fantasy-comedy
Movie 43	Various	Kate Winslet, Hugh Jackman, Liev Schreiber	United States	
Mr. Go	Kim Yong-hwa	Josie Xu, Seong Dong-il, Odagiri Joe	South Korea; China	
Nobody's Daughter Haewon	Hong Sang-soo	Jung Eun-chae, Lee Sun-kyun	South Korea	
Pain & Gain	Michael Bay	Mark Wahlberg, Dwayne Johnson, Anthony Mackie	United States	Action comedy
Paulette	Jerome Enrico		France	
Pazze di me	Fausto Brizzi		Italy	
Peeples	Tina Gordon Chism	Craig Robinson, Kerry Washington, David Alan Grier, S. Epatha Merkerson	United States	
Prince Avalanche	David Gordon Green	Paul Rudd, Emile Hirsch, Lance Le Gault	United States	
R.I.P.D.	Robert Schwentke	Ryan Reynolds, Jeff Bridges, Kevin Bacon	United States	Action comedy
Say Yes!	Leste Chen	Huang Bo, Lin Chi-ling, Qin Hailu	China; Japan	Romantic comedy
Scary Movie 5	Malcolm D. Lee	Ashley Tisdale, Charlie Sheen, Anthony Anderson	United States	
Shuddh Desi Romance	Maneesh Sharma	Sushant Singh Rajput, Parineeti Chopra, Vaani Kapoor, Rishi Kapoor	India	Romantic comedy
The Smurfs 2	Raja Gosnell	Katy Perry, Jonathan Winters, Anton Yelchin, Christina Ricci, J. B. Smoove, Fred Armisen, Alan Cumming, George Lopez, John Oliver, Hank Azaria, Frank Welker, Neil Patrick Harris, Brendan Gleeson, Jayma Mays, Jacob Tremblay	United States	Fantasy comedy
Thillu Mullu	Badri	Shiva, Isha Talwar, Prakash Raj, Kovai Sarala, Soori, Monisha, Sathyan, Manobala	India	
This is the End	Evan Goldberg, Seth Rogen	James Franco, Jonah Hill, Seth Rogen	United States	
The To Do List	Maggie Carey	Aubrey Plaza, Johnny Simmons, Bill Hader	United States	
Turbo	David Soren	Ryan Reynolds, Paul Giamatti, Michael Peña, Luis Guzman, Snoop Dogg, Maya Rudolph, Michelle Rodriguez, Samuel L. Jackson	United States	Family-oriented comedy
The Ultimate Task	Sun Lijun	Xie Na, Lu Zhixing, Han Tongsheng	China	Animated adventure comedy drama
Under the Rainbow	Agnès Jaoui		France	
Vai que Dá Certo			Brazil	
Warm Bodies	Jonathan Levine	Nicholas Hoult, Teresa Palmer, Rob Corddry	United States	
The Way, Way Back	Nat Faxon, Jim Rash	Steve Carell, Toni Collette, Liam James	United States	Comedy-Drama
We're the Millers	Rawson Marshall Thurber	Jennifer Aniston, Jason Sudeikis, Will Poulter	United States	
Will You Still Love Me Tomorrow?	Arvin Chen	Richie Ren, Mavis Fan, Shih Chin-hang	Taiwan	Romantic comedy
The Wolf of Wall Street	Martin Scorsese	Leonardo DiCaprio, Margot Robbie, Jonah Hill, Matthew McConaughey	United States	
The World's End	Edgar Wright	Simon Pegg, Nick Frost, Paddy Considine	United Kingdom	Science Fiction comedy

=== 2014 ===
Title	Director	Cast	Country	Notes
22 Jump Street	Phil Lord and Chris Miller	Jonah Hill, Channing Tatum, Peter Stormare	United States	
About Last Night	Steve Pink	Kevin Hart, Michael Ealy, Regina Hall	United States	Romantic Comedy
Alexander and the Terrible, Horrible, No Good, Very Bad Day	Miguel Arteta	Ed Oxenbould, Steve Carell, Jennifer Garner	United States	
Army of Frankensteins	Ryan Bellgardt	Jordan Farris, Christian Bellgardt, Rest Terrell	United States	Horror comedy
The Biggest Toad in the Puddle	Ho Wi Ding	Fan Lei, Yang Jinger, Wang Xiaoxi	China	
Birdman	Alejandro González Iñárritu	Michael Keaton, Edward Norton, Emma Stone, Naomi Watts, Zach Galifianakis	United States	Comedy-Drama
Blended	Frank Coraci	Drew Barrymore, Adam Sandler, Bella Thorne, Braxton Beckham, Emma Fuhrmann, Kyle Red Silverstein, Alyvia Alyn Lind	United States	
Un Boss in salotto	Luca Miniero		Italy	
Birdman	Alejandro González Iñárritu	Michael Keaton, Edward Norton, Emma Stone, Naomi Watts, Zach Galifianakis	United States	Comedy-Drama
Camp Takota	Chris Riedell, Nick Riedell	Grace Helbig, Mamrie Hart, Hannah Hart	United States	
A coup sûr	Delphine de Vigan		France	
Chef	Jon Favreau	Jon Favreau, Sofía Vergara, John Leguizamo	United States	Comedy-Drama
Date and Switch	Chris Nelson	Nicholas Braun, Hunter Cope, Dakota Johnson	United States	
Dead Snow: Red vs. Dead	Tommy Wirkola	Jocelyn De Boer, Ingrid Haas, Stig Frode Henriksen	Norway	
Dumb and Dumber To	Peter Farrelly, Bobby Farrelly	Jim Carrey, Jeff Daniels, Rachel Melvin, Laurie Holden, Rob Riggle	United States	
Dumbbells	Christopher Livingston	Brian Drolet, Hoyt Richards, Taylor Cole	United States	
Ex Fighting			China	Romantic Comedy
Les gazelles	Mona Achache		France	
The Grand Budapest Hotel	Wes Anderson	Saoirse Ronan, Ralph Fiennes, Jeff Goldblum	Germany; United Kingdom; United States	Comedy-Drama
A Haunted House 2	Michael Tiddes	Marlon Wayans, Affion Crockett, Ashley Rickards	United States	
Horrible Bosses 2	Sean Anders	Jason Bateman, Jason Sudeikis, Charlie Day	United States	
Hot Young Bloods	Lee Yeon-woo	Park Bo-young, Lee Jong-suk, Lee Se-young	South Korea	Romantic comedy
Housebound	Gerard Johnstone	Morgana O'Reilly, Rima Te Wiata, Glen-Paul Waru	New Zealand	Horror comedy
How to Fight in Six Inch Heels	Trần Hàm	Kathy Uyên, Trương Tri Trúc Diễm, Nguyễn Phương Mai	Vietnam; United States	Romantic comedy
The Hungover Games	Josh Stolberg	Hank Baskett, Tara Reid, Jonathan Silverman	United States	
The Interview	Seth Rogen, Evan Goldberg	James Franco, Seth Rogen, Lizzy Caplan, Randall Park	United States	
Judge!	Akira Nagai	Satoshi Tsumabuki, Keiko Kitagawa, Lily Franky	Japan	
Kingsman: The Secret Service	Matthew Vaughn	Colin Firth, Taron Egerton, Samuel L. Jackson	United Kingdom, United States	Action Comedy
The Lego Movie	Phil Lord, Christopher Miller	Chris Pratt, Elizabeth Banks, Will Ferrell, Will Arnett, Alison Brie, Charlie Day, Liam Neeson, Nick Offerman	United States; Denmark; Australia	Family-oriented comedy
Leaving Circadia	Evan Mathew Weinstein	Christian Coulson, Michael Cerveris, Joseph R. Gannascoli	United States	Comedy-Drama
Let's Be Cops	Luke Greenfield	Damon Wayans Jr., Jake Johnson, Rob Riggle	United States	
Life After Beth	Jeff Baena	Aubrey Plaza, Dane DeHaan, Molly Shannon, John C. Reilly	United States	Horror Comedy
Love on the Cloud	Gu Changwei	Angelababy, Michael Chen, Edward Zhang	China	Romantic comedy
Maya the Bee	Alexs Stadermann	Jacki Weaver, Richard Roxburgh, Noah Taylor, Miriam Margolyes, Justine Clarke, Coco Jack Gillies, Kodi Smit-McPhee	Germany; Australia	Animated adventure comedy
McDull: Me & My Mum	Brian Tse, Li Junmin	Sandra Ng, Anthony Wong, Huang Lei	China; Hong Kong	Animated family comedy
A Merry Friggin' Christmas	Tristram Shapeero	Joel McHale, Lauren Graham, Robin Williams, Clark Duke, Oliver Platt, Wendi McLendon-Covey, Tim Heidecker, Candice Bergen	United States	
The Midnight After	Fruit Chan	Wong You-nam, Janice Man, Simon Yam	Hong Kong	Horror Comedy
A Million Ways to Die in the West	Seth MacFarlane	Seth MacFarlane, Charlize Theron, Liam Neeson, Neil Patrick Harris, Amanda Seyfried	United States	
Mission Impossible: Samurai			Japan	Jidaigeki
Mr. Peabody & Sherman	Rob Minkoff	Ty Burrell, Max Charles, Ariel Winter, Stephen Colbert, Leslie Mann, Allison Janney	United States	Animated family comedy
Muppets Most Wanted	James Bobin	Ricky Gervais, Tina Fey, Ty Burrell	United States	
My Hawaiian Discovery	Koji Maeda	Nana Eikura, Rin Takanashi, Koji Seto	Japan; United States	Romantic comedy
Neighbors	Nicholas Stoller	Seth Rogen, Rose Byrne, Zac Efron	United States	
The Nut Job	Peter Lepeniotis		Canada; South Korea	Family-oriented comedy
Obvious Child		Jenny Slate, Jake Lacy, Gaby Hoffmann	United States	Comedy-Drama
Old Boys: The Way of the Dragon	Xiao Yang	Xiao Yang, Wang Taili, Qu Jingjing	Hong Kong; China	Romantic comedy
The Other Woman	Nick Cassavetes	Cameron Diaz, Leslie Mann, Kate Upton	United States	
The Plan Man	Sung Si-hup	Jung Jae-young, Han Ji-min, Jang Gwang	South Korea	Romantic comedy
Ride Along	Tim Story	Ice Cube, Kevin Hart, John Leguizamo	United States	Action Comedy
Rio 2	Carlos Saldanha	Anne Hathaway, Jesse Eisenberg, Jemaine Clement, Kristin Chenoweth, will.i.am, George Lopez, Bruno Mars	United States	Family-oriented comedy
Scratch	Maninder Chana	Julie Romaniuk, Craig Cyr, Romaine Waite, Jojo Karume, J.J. Reville, Len Silvini and Justin Bott	Canada	Action crime comedy-drama
Sex Tape	Jake Kasdan	Cameron Diaz, Jason Segel, Rob Corddry	United States	
The Skeleton Twins	Craig Johnson	Bill Hader, Kristen Wiig, Luke Wilson, Ty Burrell	United States	Comedy-Drama
Smetto quando voglio	Sydney Sibilia		Italy	
Stromberg - Der Film	Arne Feldhusen		Germany	
Tammy	Ben Falcone	Melissa McCarthy, Susan Sarandon, Kathy Bates	United States	
Temporary Family		Nick Cheung, Sammi Cheng, Angelababy	Hong Kong	
That Awkward Moment	Tom Gormican	Zac Efron, Michael B. Jordan, Miles Teller	United States	
Top Five	Chris Rock	Chris Rock, Gabrielle Union, Cedric the Entertainer	United States	
Town of the Dragon	Xue Cun	Xue Cun, Yu Qing, Ying Da	China	Suspense comedy
Trailer Park Boys: Don't Legalize It	Mike Clattenburg, Steph Clattenburg	John Paul Tremblay, Robb Wells, Mike Smith	Canada	
Les Trois Frères, le retour	Didier Bourdon, Bernard Campan, Pascal Légitimus		France	
The Truth About Beauty	Aubrey Lam	Bai Baihe, Ronald Cheng, Zhang Yao	Hong Kong; China	Romantic comedy
Virados do Avesso	Edgar Pêra	Diogo Morgado, Nicolau Breyner, Rui Unas	Portugal	
Walk of Shame	Steven Brill	Elizabeth Banks, James Marsden, Gillian Jacobs	United States	
What We Do in the Shadows	Jemaine Clement, Taika Waititi	Rhys Darby, Jonathan Brugh, Cori Gonzalez-Macuer	New Zealand	
Wish I Was Here	Zach Braff	Zach Braff, Donald Faison, Josh Gad, Kate Hudson	United States	Comedy-drama
Who Moved My Dream	Wang Wei, Jackson Pat	Leon Jay Williams, Zhang Lanxin, Hu Bing	China	Comedy drama romance

=== 2015 ===
Title	Director	Cast	Country	Notes
12 Golden Ducks	Matt Chow	Sandra Ng	Hong Kong	
20 Once Again	Leste Chen	Yang Zishan, Gua Ah-leh, Berlin Chen	China; South Korea; Hong Kong; Taiwan	
Accidental Love	—N/a	Jessica Biel, Jake Gyllenhaal	United Kingdom; United States	
Adult Beginners	Ross Katz	Rose Byrne, Nick Kroll, Bobby Cannavale	United States	Comedy-Drama
Alvin and the Chipmunks: The Road Chip	Walt Becker	Justin Long, Matthew Gray Gubler, Jesse McCartney, Jason Lee, Tony Hale, Kimberly Williams-Paisley	United States	
American Ultra	Nima Nourizadeh	Jesse Eisenberg, Kristen Stewart, Topher Grace	United States	
April Fools	Junichi Ishikawa	Erika Toda, Tori Matsuzaka	Japan	Comedy drama suspense
Banglaman	Namewee	Nirab Hossain, Saiful Apek, Namewee	Malaysia	
Barely Lethal	Kyle Newman	Hailee Steinfeld, Dove Cameron, Thomas Mann, Jessica Alba, Samuel L. Jackson	United States	
The Big Short	Adam McKay	Christian Bale, Steve Carell, Ryan Gosling	United States	Comedy-Drama
Chateau de la Reine	Hajime Hashimoto		Japan	
Chigasaki Story	Misawa Takuya	Koshino Ena, Sugino Kiki, Hori Natsuko	Japan	
The Cobbler	Tom McCarthy	Adam Sandler, Method Man, Ellen Barkin	United States	Comedy-Drama-
Crazy New Year's Eve	Eva Jin, Pan Anzi, Zhang Jiarui, Song Di		China; Hong Kong	
Daddy's Home	Sean Anders	Will Ferrell, Mark Wahlberg, Linda Cardellini, Scarlett Estevez	United States	
Danny Collins	Dan Fogelman	Al Pacino, Jennifer Garner, Bobby Cannavale	United States	Comedy-Drama-
Deathgasm	Jason Lei Howden	Kimberley Crossman, Erroll Shand, Delaney Tabron	New Zealand	Horror comedy
The Duff	Ari Sandel	Mae Whitman, Robbie Amell, Bella Thorne	United States	
Entourage	Doug Ellin	Jeremy Piven, Adrian Grenier, Kevin Connolly	United States	
The Final Girls	Todd Strause-Schulson	Alia Shawkat, Taissa Farmiga, Adam DeVine	United States	Comedy horror
Focus	Glenn Ficarra, John Requa	Will Smith, Rodrigo Santoro, Margot Robbie	United States	Comedy drama
Get Hard	Etan Cohen	Will Ferrell, Kevin Hart, T.I.	United States	
The Grow 2	Ha Lei	Yu Li, Wu Tian Hao, Rong Rong	China	Animated adventure comedy
Haruko's Paranormal Laboratory	Lisa Takeba	Nakamura Aoi, Nozaki Moeka, Aoki Sayaka	Japan	
Home	Tim Johnson	Jim Parsons, Rhianna, Jennifer Lopez	United States	Animated Film
Home Sweet Hell	Anthony Burns	Katherine Heigl, Patrick Wilson, Jordana Brewster	United States	
Hotel Transylvania 2	Genndy Tartakovsky	Adam Sandler, Selena Gomez, Andy Samberg	United States	Animated Film-
Hot Pursuit	Anne Fletcher	Reese Witherspoon, Sofía Vergara, Mike Birbiglia	United States	
Hot Tub Time Machine 2	Steve Pink	Craig Robinson, Clark Duke, Adam Scott	United States	
Inside Out	Pete Docter, Ronnie del Carmen	Kaitlyn Dias, Amy Poehler, Phyllis Smith, Bill Hader, Lewis Black, Mindy Kaling, Richard Kind, Diane Lane, Kyle MacLachlan	United States	Computer animation satirical fantasy comedy-drama
The Intern	Nancy Meyers	Robert De Niro, Anne Hathaway	United States	Comedy-drama
Italiano medio	Marcello Macchia		Italy	
Just Before I Go	Courteney Cox	Seann William Scott, Olivia Thirlby, Garret Dillahunt	United States	
Kung Fury	David Sandberg	David Sandberg, Jorma Taccone, Leopold Nilsson	Sweden	Action comedy short film
Lavalantula	Mike Mendez	Steve Guttenberg, Nia Peeples, Patrick Renna	United States	Television film
Looney Tunes: Rabbits Run	Jeff Siergey	Jeff Bergman, Rachel Ramras, Maurice LaMarche, Billy West, Jim Rash, Fred Armisen	United States	Animated film
Minions	Pierre Coffin, Kyle Balda	Sandra Bullock, Jon Hamm, Michael Keaton	United States	Animated Film
Mortdecai	David Koepp	Johnny Depp, Gwyneth Paltrow, Ewan McGregor	United States	Action comedy
The Night Before	Jonathan Levine	Seth Rogen, Joseph Gordon-Levitt, Anthony Mackie, Jillian Bell, Lizzy Caplan, Ilana Glazer	United States	
No Stranger Than Love	Nick Wernham	Alison Brie, Colin Hanks, Dylan Everett	Canada	
Paul Blart: Mall Cop 2	Andy Fickman	Kevin James, Raini Rodriguez, Neal McDonough	United States	
The Peanuts Movie	Steve Martino	Noah Schnapp, Hadley Belle Miller, Mariel Sheets, Alex Garfin, Francesca Angelucci Capaldi	United States	Animated Film
Pitch Perfect 2	Elizabeth Banks	Anna Kendrick, Rebel Wilson, Brittany Snow	United States	
Pixels	Chris Columbus	Adam Sandler, Peter Dinklage, Josh Gad	United States	
Results	Andrew Bujalski	Guy Pearce, Cobie Smulders, Kevin Corrigan	United States	
Ricki and the Flash	Jonathan Demme	Meryl Streep, Kevin Kline, Mamie Gummer	United States	Comedy-Drama
The Ridiculous 6	Frank Coraci	Adam Sandler, Terry Crews, Jorge Garcia, Taylor Lautner, Rob Schneider, Luke Wilson	United States	Western Action Comedy
Rock the Kasbah	Barry Levinson	Bill Murray, Kate Hudson, Zooey Deschanel	United States	
S for Sex, S for Secret		Jacquelin Chong, Jeana Ho, Philip Keung Ho-Man	Hong Kong	
Saving Christmas	Darren Doane	Kirk Cameron, Darren Doane, Bridgette Ridenour	United States	Faith-based Christmas comedy
Scratch	Maninder Chana	Julie Romaniuk, Craig Cyr, Romaine Waite, Jojo Karume, J.J. Reville, Len Silvini and Justin Bott	Canada	Action crime comedy-drama
The Second Best Exotic Marigold Hotel	John Madden	Judi Dench, Maggie Smith, Bill Nighy	United States	Comedy-Drama
Shaun the Sheep Movie	Mark Burton, Richard Starzak		United Kingdom	
Sisters	Jason Moore	Amy Poehler, Tina Fey, Maya Rudolph	United States	
Sleeping with Other People	Leslye Headland	Alison Brie, Adam Scott, Jason Sudeikis	United States	Romantic Comedy-Drama-
Some Kind of Beautiful	Tom Vaughan	Pierce Brosnan, Jessica Alba, Salma Hayek	United States	Romantic comedy
The SpongeBob Movie: Sponge Out of Water	Mike Mitchell, Paul Tibbitt	Tom Kenny, Bill Fagerbakke, Rodger Bumpass, Doug Lawrence, Clancy Brown, Carolyn Lawrence, Antonio Banderas	United States	Animated Film
Spy	Paul Feig	Melissa McCarthy, Jason Statham, Rose Byrne	United States	
The Sweet Escape	Bruno Podalydès		France	
The Tale of Nishino	Iguchi Nami	Takenouchi Yutaka, Ono Machiko, Narumi Riko	Japan	
Tales of Halloween	Neil Marshall, Darren Lynn Bousman, Axelle Carolyn	Grace Phipps, Booboo Stewart, Adrienne Barbeau	United States	Comedy horror
Ted 2	Seth MacFarlane	Seth MacFarlane, Mark Wahlberg, Amanda Seyfried	United States	
Trainwreck	Judd Apatow	Amy Schumer, Bill Hader, LeBron James	United States	
Twenty	Lee Byeong-heon	Kim U-bin, Lee Jun-ho, Gang Ha-neu	South Korea	
Unfinished Business	Ken Scott	Vince Vaughn, Tom Wilkinson, Dave Franco	United States	
Unforgettable Blast	Yan Tinglu	Jiang Jo, Jiang Xueming, Wang Xia	China	
Vacation	Jonathan Goldstein, John Francis Daley	Ed Helms, Christina Applegate, Skyler Gisondo, Steele Stebbins, Leslie Mann, Chevy Chase, Beverly D'Angelo	United States	
The Wedding Ringer	Jeremy Garelick	Kevin Hart, Josh Gad, Kaley Cuoco-Sweeting	United States	
Z Island	Hiroshi Shinagawa	Show Aikawa, Sawa Suzuki, Yūichi Kimura	Japan	Action comedy horror

=== 2016 ===
Title	Director	Cast	Country	Notes
Almost Christmas	David E. Talbert	Danny Glover, Mo'Nique, Gabrielle Union	United States	Comedy-Drama
Amateur Night	Lisa Addario, Joe Syracuse	Jason Biggs, Janet Montgomery, Ashley Tisdale	United States	
The Angry Birds Movie	Clay Kaytis, Fergal Reilly	Jason Sudeikis, Josh Gad, Danny McBride, Maya Rudolph, Kate McKinnon, Bill Hader, Peter Dinklage	United States; Finland	Animated Film
Ice Age: Collision Course	Michael Thurmeier	Ray Romano, John Leguizamo, Denis Leary, Josh Peck, Simon Pegg, Seann William Scott, Jennifer Lopez, Queen Latifah	United States	Animated science-fiction comedy
Bad Moms	Jon Lucas, Scott Moore	Mila Kunis, Kristen Bell, Kathryn Hahn, Christina Applegate	United States	
Bad Santa 2	Mark Waters	Billy Bob Thornton, Tony Cox, Kathy Bates, Christina Hendricks	United States	
Barbershop: The Next Cut	Malcolm D. Lee	Ice Cube, Cedric the Entertainer, Eve, Nicki Minaj, Regina Hall	United States	
Boo! A Madea Halloween	Tyler Perry	Tyler Perry, Bella Thorne, Cassi Davis	United States	
The Boss	Ben Falcone	Melissa McCarthy, Kristen Bell, Ella Anderson, Peter Dinklage	United States	
Bridget Jones's Baby	Hallie Meyers-Shyer	Renee Zellweger, Colin Firth, Patrick Dempsey	United States	Romantic Comedy
The Bronze	Bryan Buckley	Melissa Rauch, Gary Cole, Thomas Middleditch, Cecily Strong	United States	
Central Intelligence	Rawson Marshall Thurber	Dwayne Johnson, Kevin Hart, Amy Ryan	United States	Action Comedy
The Comedian	Taylor Hackford	Robert De Niro, Leslie Mann	United States	Comedy drama
Deadpool	Tim Miller	Ryan Reynolds, Ed Skrein, Morena Baccarin	United States	Action Comedy
Dirty 30	Andrew Bush	Mamrie Hart, Grace Helbig, Hannah Hart	United States	
Dirty Grandpa	Dan Mazer	Zac Efron, Robert De Niro, Julianne Hough	United States	
Donald Trump's The Art of the Deal: The Movie	Jeremy Konner	Johnny Depp, Michaela Watkins, Jack McBrayer	United States	Parody film
Don't Kill It	Mike Mendez	Dolph Lundgren, Kristina Klebe, Tony Bentley	United States	Horror comedy
The Do-Over	Steven Brill	Adam Sandler, David Spade, Paula Patton, Kathryn Hahn	United States	Action Comedy
Fifty Shades of Black	Michael Tiddes	Marlon Wayans, Jane Seymour, Mike Epps	United States	
Finding Dory	Andrew Stanton	Ellen DeGeneres, Albert Brooks, Hayden Rolence	United States	Animated Film
Get a Job	Dylan Kidd	Miles Teller, Anna Kendrick, Brandon T. Jackson	United States	
Ghostbusters	Paul Feig	Kristen Wiig, Melissa McCarthy, Kate McKinnon, Leslie Jones	United States	
Grimsby	Louis Leterrier	Sacha Baron Cohen, Mark Strong, Rebel Wilson, Isla Fisher	United States	
Hail, Caesar!	Joel and Ethan Coen	Josh Brolin, George Clooney, Ralph Fiennes	United States	
The Hollars	John Krasinski	John Krasinski, Anna Kendrick, Richard Jenkins, Margo Martindale	United States	Comedy-Drama
How to Be Single	Christian Ditter	Dakota Johnson, Rebel Wilson, Alison Brie, Leslie Mann	United States	Romantic comedy
Kapoor & Sons	Shakun Batra	Sidharth Malhotra, Alia Bhatt, Rishi Kapoor, Ratna Pathak Shah, Fawad Khan	India	Romantic Comedy-Drama
Keanu	Peter Atencio	Jordan Peele, Keegan-Michael Key, Keanu Reeves, Tiffany Haddish, Method Man, Luis Guzman, Nia Long	United States	
Keeping Up with the Joneses	Greg Mottola	Jon Hamm, Zach Galifianakis, Gal Gadot, Isla Fisher	United States	Action Comedy
Kung Fu Panda 3	Jennifer Yuh Nelson and Alessandro Carloni	Jack Black, Angelina Jolie, Dustin Hoffman	United States; China	Animated Action-Adventure Comedy
Mike and Dave Need Wedding Dates	Jake Szymanski	Zac Efron, Adam DeVine, Anna Kendrick, Aubrey Plaza	United States	
Morris from America	Chad Hartigan	Markees Christmas, Craig Robinson, Carla Juri	United States	Comedy-Drama
Mr. Right	Paco Cabezas	Sam Rockwell, Anna Kendrick, Tim Roth	United States	Romantic Action Comedy
Neighbors 2: Sorority Rising	Nicholas Stoller	Seth Rogen, Rose Byrne, Chloë Grace Moretz, Dave Franco	United States	
The Nice Guys	Shane Black	Russell Crowe, Ryan Gosling	United States	Action Comedy
Nine Lives	Barry Sonnenfield	Kevin Spacey, Jennifer Garner, Robbie Amell, Cheryl Hines	United States	
Norm of the North	Trevor Wall	Rob Schneider, Heather Graham, Colm Meaney	United States	Animated Comedy
Office Christmas Party	Will Speck, Josh Gordon	T.J. Miller, Jason Bateman, Jennifer Aniston, Olivia Munn, Vanessa Bayer, Kate McKinnon, Jillian Bell	United States	
Popstar: Never Stop Never Stopping	Akiva Schaffer, Jorma Taccone	Andy Samberg, Jorma Taccone, Akiva Schaffer, Sarah Silverman, Tim Meadows	United States	
Quo Vado?	Gennaro Nunziante	Checco Zalone, Ninni Bruschetta, Sonia Bergamasco	Italy	
Ride Along 2	Tim Story	Ice Cube, Kevin Hart, Olivia Munn, Benjamin Bratt	United States	Action Comedy
Sausage Party	Conrad Vernon, Greg Tiernan	Seth Rogen, Kristen Wiig, Jonah Hill	United States; Canada	Animated film
The Secret Life of Pets	Chris Renaud and Yarrow Cheney	Louis C.K., Eric Stonestreet, Kevin Hart	United States	Animated Buddy Comedy
Spring Break Zombie Massacre	Bobby Carnevale	Sam Suchmann, Mattie Zufelt, Pauly D	United States	Action comedy
Storks	Nicholas Stoller, Doug Sweetland	Andy Samberg, Katie Crown, Kelsey Grammer, Ty Burrell, Jennifer Aniston, Stephen Kramer Glickman	United States	Animated Film
Swingers	Andrejs Ēķis		Latvia	
Swiss Army Man	Daniel Scheinert, Daniel Kwan	Paul Dano, Daniel Radcliffe, Mary Elizabeth Winstead	United States	Comedy-Drama
Trolls	Mike Mitchell and Erica Rivinoja	Anna Kendrick, Justin Timberlake	United States	Animated Musical film
True Memoirs of an International Assassin	Jeff Wadlow	Kevin James, Zulay Henao, Andy García, Maurice Compte, Kelen Coleman, Andrew Howard, Rob Riggle	United States	Action Comedy
Velainu Vandhutta Vellaikaaran	Ezhil	Vishnu Vishal, Nikki Galrani, Soori, Robo Shankar, Reshma Pasupuleti, Aadukalam Naren, Ravi Mariya, Rajendran, Vaiyapuri, Sonia, Saravana Subbiah, Ashwin Raja, Bava Lakshmanan	India	
What a Wonderful Family!	Yoji Yamada	Isao Hashizume, Kazuko Yoshiyuki, Masahiko Nishimura	Japan	
Why Him?	John Hamburg	James Franco, Bryan Cranston, Megan Mullally, Zoey Deutch, Cedric the Entertainer	United States	
Zoolander 2	Ben Stiller	Ben Stiller, Owen Wilson, Will Ferrell	United States	
Zootopia	Byron Howard, Rich Moore	Jason Bateman, Ginnifer Goodwin, Idris Elba	United States	Animated film

=== 2017 ===
Title	Director	Cast	Country	Notes
Baby Driver	Edgar Wright	Ansel Elgort, Kevin Spacey, Lily James, Jon Bernthal	United Kingdom; United States	Action Comedy
The Babysitter	McG	Samara Weaving, Judah Lewis, Hana Mae Lee	United States	Horror Comedy
A Bad Moms Christmas	Jon Lucas, Scott Moore	Mila Kunis, Kathryn Hahn, Kristen Bell, Christine Baranski, Susan Sarandon, Cheryl Hines	United States	
Baywatch	Seth Gordon	Dwayne Johnson, Zac Efron	United States	Action Comedy
Berangkat!	Naya Anindita	Tarra Budiman, Ayushita, Ringgo Agus Rahman, Tanta Ginting, Reza Nangin, Martin Anugrah, Saykoji, Annisa Pagih and Babe Cabita	Indonesia	Adventure comedy-drama
Boo 2! A Madea Halloween	Tyler Perry	Tyler Perry, Cassi Davis, Patrice Lovely	United States	
The Boss Baby	Tom McGrath	Alec Baldwin, Miles Christopher Bakshi, Steve Buscemi	United States	Animated Buddy Comedy
Captain Underpants: The First Epic Movie	David Soren and Rob Letterman	Kevin Hart, Ed Helms, Thomas Middleditch, Nick Kroll	United States	Animated superhero action-comedy
Cars 3	Brian Fee	Owen Wilson, Cristela Alonzo, Armie Hammer, Larry the Cable Guy, Bonnie Hunt	United States	Family-oriented comedy
Catfight	Onur Tukel	Anne Heche, Sandra Oh, Alicia Silverstone	United States	
CHiPs	Dax Shepard	Dax Shepard, Michael Peña	United States	Action Comedy
Colossal	Nacho Vigalondo	Anne Hathaway, Jason Sudeikis	United States	Science Fiction Comedy
Cook Off!	Guy Shalem, Cathryn Michon	Cathryn Michon, Melissa McCarthy, Wendi McLendon-Covey	United States	
Daddy's Home 2	Sean Anders	Will Ferrell, Mark Wahlberg, John Lithgow, Mel Gibson	United States	
Despicable Me 3	Pierre Coffin, Kyle Balda	Steve Carell, Kirsten Wiig, Miranda Cosgrove, Dana Gaier, Nev Scharrel, Trey Parker	United States	Animated Film
Diary of a Wimpy Kid: The Long Haul	David Bowers	Jason Ian Drucker, Owen Asztalos, Charlie Wright	United States	Family-oriented comedy
The Disaster Artist	James Franco	James Franco, Dave Franco, Seth Rogen, Alison Brie, Ari Graynor	United States	Comedy-Drama
Downsizing	Alexander Payne	Matt Damon, Kirsten Wiig, Christopher Waltz	United States	Comedy-Drama
The Emoji Movie	Tony Leondis	T.J. Miller, James Corden, Anna Faris, Maya Rudolph, Steven Wright, Jennifer Coolidge	United States	Animated Film
Father Figures	Lawrence Sher	Owen Wilson, Ed Helms, J.K. Simmons	United States	
Ferdinand	Carlos Saldanha	John Cena, David Tennant, Anthony Anderson	United States	Animated Comedy
Fist Fight	Richie Keen	Ice Cube, Charlie Day	United States	
Girls Trip	Malcolm D. Lee	Regina Hall, Tiffany Haddish, Queen Latifah, Jada Pinkett Smith	United States	
Going in Style	Zach Braff	Morgan Freeman, Michael Caine, Alan Arkin	United States	
Happy Birthday, Toby Simpson	Patrick Makin	Alexander Perkins, Edyta Budnik, Zara Symes, Gary Heasman, Josh Wood, Joe Makin and Lily Makin	United Kingdom	Romantic comedy-drama
Happy Death Day	Christopher Landon	Jessica Rothe, Israel Broussard, Ruby Modine	United States	
The Hitman's Bodyguard	Patrick Hughes	Ryan Reynolds, Samuel L. Jackson, Salma Hayek	United States	Action Comedy
Home Again	Hallie Meyers-Shyer	Reese Witherspoon, Nat Wolf, Jon Rudnitsky, Lola Flanery, Eden Grace Redfield	United States	Romantic Comedy
How to Be a Latin Lover	Ken Marino	Eugenio Derbez, Salma Hayek, Rob Lowe, Kristen Bell	United States	
I, Tonya	Craig Gillespie	Margot Robbie, Sebastian Stan, Allison Janney	United States	
Jumanji: Welcome to the Jungle	Jake Kasdan	Dwayne Johnson, Kevin Hart, Karen Gillan, Jack Black	United States	Adventure Fantasy Comedy
Just Getting Started	Ron Shelton	Morgan Freeman, Tommy Lee Jones, Rene Russo	United States	Action Comedy
Kingsman: The Golden Circle	Matthew Vaughn	Taron Egerton, Colin Firth, Julianne Moore, Halle Berry, Mark Strong	United Kingdom; United States	
The Lego Batman Movie	Chris McKay	Will Arnett, Zach Galifianakis, Michael Cera, Rosario Dawson	United States; Denmark; Australia	
The Lego Ninjago Movie	Charlie Bean	Dave Franco, Michael Peña, Kumail Nanjiani, Abbi Jacobson, Zach Woods, Fred Armisen, Jackie Chan	United States	Animated Martial Arts Film
Little Evil	Eli Craig	Evangeline Lilly, Adam Scott, Bridget Everett	United States	Horror comedy
The Lovers	Azazel Jacobs	Debra Winger, Tracy Letts	United States	Romantic Comedy
Naked	Michael Tiddes	Marlon Wayans, Regina Hall, Dennis Haysbert	United States	
The Nut Job 2: Nutty by Nature	Cal Brunker	Will Arnett, Katherine Heigl, Jackie Chan, Maya Rudolph	United States	Animated Film
The Outcasts	Peter Hutchings	Victoria Justice, Eden Sher, Ashley Rickards, Claudia Lee, Katie Chang, Peyton List	United States	
Paris Can Wait	Eleanor Coppola	Diane Lane, Alec Baldwin	United States	
Pitch Perfect 3	Trish Sie	Anna Kendrick, Rebel Wilson, Brittany Snow, Anna Camp	United States	
Rough Night	Lucia Aniello	Scarlett Johansson, Jillian Bell, Ilana Glazer, Zoe Kravitz, Kate McKinnon	United States	
Sandy Wexler	Steven Brill	Adam Sandler, Jennifer Hudson, Kevin James, Terry Crews, Rob Schneider, Lamorne Morris	United States	
Skin: The Movie	Ronn Kilby	Mark Christopher Lawrence, Diane Sargent, Michelle Way, "Shotgun Tom" Kelly	United States	
Smurfs: The Lost Village	Kelly Asbury	Demi Lovato, Rainn Wilson, Joe Manganiello, Jack McBrayer, Danny Pudi, Michelle Rodriguez, Ellie Kemper, Ariel Winter, Mandy Patinkin, Julia Roberts	United States	Animated Fantasy Comedy
Snatched	Jonathan Levine	Amy Schumer, Goldie Hawn	United States	
Spark	Aaron Woodley	Jace Norman, Jessica Biel, Susan Sarandon, Patrick Stewart, Hilary Swank	United States; Canada; South Korea	Animated Science Fantasy Comedy
Tragedy Girls	Tyler MacIntyre	Alexandra Shipp, Brianna Hildebrand, Josh Hutcherson	United States	Horror comedy
T2 Trainspotting	Danny Boyle	Ewan McGregor, Ewen Bremner, Jonny Lee Miller, Robert Carlyle	United Kingdom	Black comedy drama
The Underdogs	Adink Liwutang	Sheryl Sheinafia, Brandon Salim, Jeff Smith and Babe Cabita	Indonesia	YouTuber-themed musical comedy-drama
Woody Woodpecker	Alex Zamm	Eric Bauza, Timothy Omundson, Graham Verchere, Thaila Ayala, Jordana Largy, Scott McNeil	United States	

=== 2018 ===
Title	Director	Cast	Country	Notes
Action Point	Tim Kirby	Johnny Knoxville, Chris Pontius, Eleanor Worthington Cox	United States	
After Everything	Hannah Marks	Jeremy Allen White, Maika Monroe, Sasha Lane	United States	Comedy-Drama
An Evening with Beverly Luff Linn	Jim Hosking	Craig Robinson, Aubrey Plaza, Emile Hirsch, Jemaine Clement	United States	
Blockers	Kay Cannon	Leslie Mann, John Cena, Ike Barinholtz	United States	
Boundaries	Shana Feste	Vera Farmiga, Christopher Plummer, Lewis MacDougall, Bobby Cannavale	United States	Comedy-Drama
Christopher Robin	Marc Forster	Ewan McGregor, Jim Cummings, Nick Mohammed, Peter Capaldi, Sophie Okonedo, Sara Sheen, Toby Jones, Hayley Atwell	United States	Live-Action/Animated Fantasy Comedy-Drama
Crazy Rich Asians	John M. Chu	Constance Wu, Henry Golding, Gemma Chan	United States	Comedy-Drama
Deadpool 2	David Leitch	Ryan Reynolds, Josh Brolin, T.J. Miller	United States	Action Comedy
The Death of Stalin	Armando Iannucci	Steve Buscemi, Simon Russell Beale, Paddy Considine	United Kingdom	
Destination Wedding	Victor Levin	Winona Ryder, Keanu Reeves	United States	Comedy-Drama
Dog Days	Ken Marino	Vanessa Hudgens, Michael Cassidy, Jon Bass	United States	
Early Man	Nick Park	Eddie Redmayne, Tom Hiddleston, Maisie Williams	United Kingdom	Animated Film
Father of the Year	Tyler Spindel	David Spade, Nat Faxon, Joey Bragg, Matt Shively, Bridgit Mendler	United States	
Furlough	Laurie Collyer	Tessa Thompson, Melissa Leo, Whoopi Goldberg	United States	
Game Night	Jonathan Goldstein, John Francis Daley	Jason Bateman, Rachel McAdams, Kyle Chandler	United States	
Game Over, Man!	Kyle Newacheck	Adam DeVine, Anders Holm, Blake Anderson	United States	
Goosebumps 2: Haunted Halloween	Ari Sandel	Madison Iseman, Jeremy Ray Taylor, Caleel Harris	United States	Horror Comedy
Green Book	Peter Farrelly	Viggo Mortensen, Mahershala Ali, Linda Cardellini	United States	Comedy-Drama
The Grinch	Scott Mosier, Yarrow Cheney	Benedict Cumberbatch, Cameron Seely, Rashida Jones, Kenan Thompson, Pharrell Williams	United States	Animated film
Gringo	Nash Edgerton	David Oyelowo, Joel Edgerton, Amanda Seyfried	United States	Action Comedy
The Happytime Murders	Brian Henson	Melissa McCarthy, Bill Barretta, Maya Rudolph, Joel McHale	United States	
Hello Mr. Billionaire	Fei Yan, Damo Peng	Shen Teng, Vivian Sung, Zhang Yiming, Chang Yuan	China	
Holmes & Watson	Etan Cohen	Will Ferrell, John C. Reilly, Rebecca Hall	United States	
Hotel Transylvania 3: Summer Vacation	Genndy Tartakovsky	Adam Sandler, Selena Gomez, Andy Samberg	United States	Animated Film
The House with a Clock in Its Walls	Eli Roth	Jack Black, Owen Vaccaro, Cate Blanchett	United States	Fantasy Comedy
How to Talk to Girls at Parties	John Cameron Mitchell	Elle Fanning, Alex Sharp, Nicole Kidman	United States	Science Fiction Comedy
I Feel Pretty	Abby Kohn, Marc Silverstein	Amy Schumer, Michelle Williams, Emily Ratajkowski	United States	
Incredibles 2	Brad Bird	Holly Hunter, Craig T. Nelson, Sarah Vowell, Huckleberry Milner, Bob Odenkirk, Catherine Keener	United States	Animated Action Film
Instant Family	Sean Anders	Mark Wahlberg, Rose Byrne, Isabela Merced, Gustavo Escobar, Julianna Gamiz	United States	Comedy-Drama
Isle of Dogs	Wes Anderson	Bryan Cranston, Bill Murray, Jeff Goldblum	United States	Stop Motion Animated Film
Johnny English Strikes Again	David Kerr	Rowan Atkinson, Ben Miller, Olga Kurylenko	United Kingdom, United States	
Juliet, Naked	Jesse Peretz	Rose Byrne, Ethan Hawke, Chris O'Dowd	United States	Romantic Comedy
Life of the Party	Ben Falcone	Melissa McCarthy, Maya Rudolph, Molly Gordon	United States	
Little Italy	Donald Petrie	Emma Roberts, Hayden Christensen, Alyssa Milano	United States	Romantic Comedy
Love, Simon	Greg Berlanti	Nick Robinson, Josh Duhamel, Jennifer Garner	United States	Comedy-Drama
Mid90s	Jonah Hill	Sunny Suljic, Na-Kel Smith, Olan Prenatt	United States	Comedy-Drama
Monster Family	Holger Tappe	Emily Watson, Jason Isaacs, Nick Frost	United States	Animated Film
Nekrotronic	Kiah Roache-Turner	Ben O'Toole, Monica Bellucci, Caroline Ford	Australia	
Never Goin' Back	Augustine Frizzell	Maia Mitchell, Camila Morrone	United States	
Night School	Malcolm D. Lee	Kevin Hart, Tiffany Haddish, Rob Riggle	United States	
Nobody's Fool	Tyler Perry	Tika Sumpter, Tiffany Haddish, Omari Hardwick, Whoopi Goldberg	United States	
The Oath	Ike Barinholtz	Ike Barinholtz, Tiffany Haddish, John Cho	United States	
Ocean's 8	Gary Ross	Sandra Bullock, Cate Blanchett, Anne Hathaway, Mindy Kaling, Sarah Paulson, Awkwafina, Rihanna, Helena Bonham Carter, Dakota Fanning	United States	
Overboard	Rob Greenberg, Bob Fisher	Anna Faris, Eugenio Derbez, Eva Longoria	United States	
Peter Rabbit	Will Gluck	James Corden, Margot Robbie, Daisy Ridley, Domhnall Gleeson, Rose Byrne	United States	
Ralph Breaks the Internet	Rich Moore, Phil Johnston	John C. Reilly, Sarah Silverman, Taraji P. Henson	United States	Animated Film
The Samuel Project	Marc Fusco	Hal Linden, Ryan Ochoa, Michael B. Silver, Ken Davitian, Liza Lapira	United States	Comedy-Drama
Second Act	Peter Segal	Jennifer Lopez, Vanessa Hudgens, Leah Remini, Treat Williams	United States	Romantic Comedy
Sherlock Gnomes	John Stevenson	James McAvoy, Emily Blunt, Johnny Depp	United States; United Kingdom	Animated 3D Film
A Simple Favor	Paul Feig	Anna Kendrick, Blake Lively, Henry Golding	United States	Crime Thriller Comedy
Sorry to Bother You	Boots Riley	LaKeith Stanfield, David Cross, Tessa Thompson, Lily James, Jermaine Fowler, Omari Hardwick, Patton Oswalt, Terry Crews	United States	Science Fiction Comedy
The Spy Who Dumped Me	Susanna Fogel	Mila Kunis, Kate McKinnon, Sam Heughan	United States	Action Comedy
Super Troopers 2	Jay Chandrasekhar	Jay Chandrasekhar, Paul Soter, Steve Lemme	United States	
Tag	Jeff Tomsic	Jeremy Renner, Ed Helms, Jake Johnson, Hannibal Buress, Jon Hamm	United States	
Teen Titans Go! To the Movies	Peter Rida Michail, Aaron Horvath	Scott Menville, Hynden Walch, Tara Strong, Khary Payton, Greg Cipes, Will Arnett, Kristen Bell	United States	Animated Film
Tully	Jason Reitman	Charlize Theron, Mackenzie Davis, Mark Duplass	United States	Comedy-DramaFocus Features
Uncle Drew	Charles Stone III	Kyrie Irving, Lil Rel Howery, Shaquille O'Neal	United States	Focus Features
The Week Of	Robert Smigel	Adam Sandler, Chris Rock, Rachel Dratch, Steve Buscemi, Vinny Beedle, Allison Strong	United States	

=== 2019 ===
Title	Director	Cast	Country	Notes
The Addams Family	Conrad Vernon, Greg Tiernan	Oscar Isaac, Charlize Theron, Chloë Grace Moretz, Finn Wolfhard, Nick Kroll, Bette Midler, Allison Janney	United States	Animated Film
Always Be My Maybe	Nahnatchka Khan	Randall Park, Ali Wong, Michael Golamco	United States	Romantic Comedy
The Angry Birds Movie 2	Thurop Van Orman	Jason Sudeikis, Josh Gad, Danny McBride, Bill Hader, Peter Dinklage, Leslie Jones, Awkwafina, Rachel Bloom, Sterling K. Brown, Eugenio Derbez	United States; Finland	Animated CGI Film
Arctic Dogs	Aaron Woodley	Jeremy Renner, James Franco, Heidi Klum, Alec Baldwin, John Cleese	United States	Animated Film
The Art of Racing in the Rain	Simon Curtis	Kevin Costner, Milo Ventimiglia, Amanda Seyfried, Kathy Baker	United States	Comedy-Drama
The Beach Bum	Harmony Korine	Matthew McConaughey, Snoop Dogg, Isla Fisher, Martin Lawrence	United States	
Booksmart	Olivia Wilde	Kaitlyn Dever, Beanie Feldstein, Billie Lourd	United States	
Brittany Runs a Marathon	Paul Downs Colaizzo	Jillian Bell, Michaela Watkins, Utkarsh Ambudkar, Lil Rel Howery	United States	
Buffaloed	Tanya Wexler	Zoey Deutch, Jermaine Fowler, Judy Greer	United States	Comedy-Drama
Charlie's Angels	Elizabeth Banks	Kristen Stewart, Naomi Scott, Ella Balinska	United States	Action Comedy
The Dead Don't Die	Jim Jarmusch	Bill Murray, Adam Driver, Chloë Sevigny, Tilda Swinton	United States	
Detective Pikachu	Rob Letterman	Ryan Reynolds, Justice Smith, Kathryn Newton	United States	Mystery Fantasy Comedy
Dolemite Is My Name	Craig Brewer	Eddie Murphy, Keegan-Michael Key, Mike Epps	United States	
Dora and the Lost City of Gold	James Bobin	Isabela Moner, Eugenio Derbez, Michael Peña, Eva Longoria, Danny Trejo	United States	
Drunk Parents	Fred Wolf	Alec Baldwin, Salma Hayek, Natalia Cigliuti, Jim Gaffigan, Joe Manganiello, Ben Platt, Treat Williams	United States	
Fighting with My Family	Stephen Merchant	Florence Pugh, Lena Headey, Nick Frost	United States	Comedy-Drama
Good Boys	Gene Stupnitsky	Jacob Tremblay, Keith L. Williams, Brady Noon	United States	
Grand-Daddy Day Care	Ron Oliver	Danny Trejo, Reno Wilson, Hal Linden, Linda Gray, George Wendt, Margaret Avery, Julia Duffy, Garrett Morris	United States	
Happy Death Day 2U	Christopher Landon	Jessica Rothe, Israel Broussard, Suraj Sharma	United States	
Hit & Run	Ody C. Harahap	Joe Taslim, Chandra Liow, Tatjana Saphira, Jefri Nichol, Nadya Arina, Yayan Ruhian, Reza Aditya, Qausar Harta Yudana, Peter Taslim, Simone Julia, David Hendrawan, Novi Rahmat Hidayat, Karina Suwandhi, Mathias Muchus, Caitlin North Lewis, Tika Panggabean, Aufa Assagaf, Dayu Wijanto, Mardiyono "Mardi" Sulaiman and Tanta Ginting	Indonesia and South Korea	Action comedy
Hobbs & Shaw	David Leitch	Dwayne Johnson, Jason Statham, Vanessa Kirby	United States	Action Comedy
The Hustle	Chris Addison	Anne Hathaway, Rebel Wilson, Alex Sharp	United States	
Isn't It Romantic	Todd Strauss-Schulson	Rebel Wilson, Liam Hemsworth, Adam Devine	United States	Romantic Comedy
Jojo Rabbit	Taika Waititi	Roman Griffin Davis, Taika Waititi, Scarlett Johansson, Thomasin McKenzie	United States	Comedy-Drama
Jumanji: The Next Level	Todd Strauss-Schulson	Dwayne Johnson, Jack Black, Kevin Hart, Karen Gillan	United States	
Klaus	Sergio Pablos	Jason Schwartzman, J.K. Simmons, Rashida Jones	United States	Animated Film
Knives Out	Rian Johnson	Daniel Craig, Chris Evans, Jamie Lee Curtis, Michael Shannon	United States	
Late Night	Nisha Ganatra	Mindy Kaling, Emma Thompson, Max Casella	United States	Comedy-Drama
Last Christmas	Paul Feig	Emilia Clarke, Henry Golding, Michelle Yeoh	United States	Romantic Comedy
The Laundromat	Steven Soderbergh	Meryl Streep, Gary Oldman, Antonio Banderas, Karen Gillan	United States	Comedy-Drama
The Lego Movie 2: The Second Part	Mike Mitchell	Chris Pratt, Elizabeth Banks, Nick Offerman, Will Arnett, Charlie Day, Tiffany Haddish, Alison Brie, Stephanie Beatriz	United States	
Let It Snow	Luke Snellin	Isabela Merced, Shameik Moore, Odeya Rush, Liv Hewson, Mitchell Hope, Kiernan Shipka, Matthew Noszka, Jacob Batalon, Miles Robbins, Joan Cusack	United States	Romantic Comedy
Little	Tina Gordon	Regina Hall, Marsai Martin, Issa Rae	United States	
Little Monsters	Abe Forsythe	Lupita Nyong'o, Alexander England, Josh Gad	United States	Horror Comedy
Long Shot	Jonathan Levine	Seth Rogen, Charlize Theron, O'Shea Jackson Jr	United States	
Loqueesha	Jeremy Saville	Jeremy Saville, Susan Diol, Tiara Parker	United States	
A Madea Family Funeral	Tyler Perry	Tyler Perry, Cassi Davis, Patrice Lovely	United States	
Men in Black: International	F. Gary Gray	Chris Hemsworth, Tessa Thompson, Rebecca Ferguson	United States	Science Fiction Comedy
Missing Link	Chris Butler	Hugh Jackman, Zoe Saldaña, David Walliams	United States	Stop-Motion Animated Film
Murder Mystery	Kyle Newacheck	Adam Sandler, Jennifer Aniston, Luke Evans	United States	Mystery Comedy
Nancy Drew and the Hidden Staircase	Katt Shea	Sophia Lillis, Sam Trammell, Linda Lavin	United States	Mystery Comedy
Noelle	Marc Lawrence	Anna Kendrick, Bill Hader, Shirley MacLaine, Kingsley Ben-Adir	United States	
Once Upon a Time in Hollywood	Quentin Tarantino	Leonardo DiCaprio, Brad Pitt, Margot Robbie, Dakota Fanning	United States	Comedy-Drama
Playing with Fire	Andy Fickman	John Cena, Keegan-Michael Key, John Leguizamo	United States	
Poms	Zara Hayes	Diane Keaton, Jacki Weaver, Rhea Perlman, Alisha Boe, Charlie Tahan, Celia Weston, Pam Grier	United States	
The Secret Life of Pets 2	Chris Renaud	Patton Oswalt, Kevin Hart, Eric Stonestreet, Jenny Slate, Tiffany Haddish, Lake Bell, Nick Kroll, Dana Carvey, Ellie Kemper, Chris Renaud, Hannibal Buress, Bobby Moynihan, Harrison Ford	United States	Animated Comedy Movie
Sextuplets	Michael Tiddes	Marlon Wayans, Bresha Webb, Michael Ian Black	United States	
Shaft	Tim Story	Samuel L. Jackson, Jacki Weaver, Regina Hall	United States	Action Comedy
Shazam!	David F. Sandberg	Zachary Levi, Mark Strong, Asher Angel	United States	Action Comedy
Someone Great	Jennifer Kaytin Robinson	Gina Rodriguez, Brittany Snow, DeWanda Wise	United States	Romantic Comedy
Spies in Disguise	Troy Quane	Will Smith, Tom Holland, Ben Mendelsohn	United States	Animated Action Comedy
Stuber	Michael Dowse	Kumail Nanjiani, Dave Bautista, Iko Uwais	United States	Action Comedy
Sword of Trust	Lynn Shelton	Marc Maron, Jon Bass, Michaela Watkins, Tim Paul, Whitmer Thomas, Toby Huss, Dan Bakkedahl, Jillian Bell	United States	
Toy Story 4	Josh Cooley	Tom Hanks, Tim Allen, Annie Potts	United States	Animated Film
UglyDolls	Kelly Asbury	Kelly Clarkson, Janelle Monáe, Blake Shelton	United States	Animated Film
Under the Silver Lake	David Robert Mitchell	Andrew Garfield, Riley Keough, Topher Grace	United States	
The Upside	Neil Burger	Bryan Cranston, Kevin Hart, Nicole Kidman	United States	Comedy-Drama
Ready or Not	Matt Bettinelli-Olpin; Tyler Gillett	Samara Weaving, Adam Brody, Mark O'Brien, Elyse Levesque, Nicky Guadagni, Henry Czerny, Andie MacDowell	United States	Horror Comedy
What Men Want	Adam Shankman	Taraji P. Henson, Aldis Hodge, Richard Roundtree	United States	
Where'd You Go, Bernadette	Richard Linklater	Cate Blanchett, Billy Crudup, Kristen Wiig, Judy Greer	United States	Comedy-Drama
Wine Country	Amy Poehler	Amy Poehler, Rachel Dratch, Ana Gasteyer, Maya Rudolph, Paula Pell, Emily Spivey, Tina Fey	United States	
Wonder Park	David Robert Mitchell	Brianna Denski, Jennifer Garner, Matthew Broderick, John Oliver, Mila Kunis, Kenan Thompson, Ken Jeong, Norbert Leo Butz, Ken Hudson Campbell	United States	Animated Film
Yesterday	Danny Boyle	Himesh Patel, Lily James, Ed Sheeran, Kate McKinnon	United States	Romantic Musical Comedy
Zombieland: Double Tap	Ruben Fleischer	Woody Harrelson, Jesse Eisenberg, Emma Stone	United States	
