= List of Japanese films of 2010 =

== Highest-grossing films ==
Rank	Title	Gross
1	Arrietty	¥9.25 billion
2	Umizaru 3: The Last Message	¥8.04 billion
3	Bayside Shakedown 3	¥7.31 billion
4	One Piece Film: Strong World	¥4.80 billion
5	Pokémon: Zoroark: Master of Illusions	¥4.16 billion

== List of films ==
A list of films produced in Japan in 2010 (see 2010 in film):

Opening	Title	Director	Cast	Genre	Notes	Ref
3 April	Accidental Kidnapper	Hideo Sakaki	Katsunori Takahashi, Show Aikawa, Roi Hayashi	Crime comedy		
13 March	After the Flowers	Kenji Nakanish	Keiko Kitagawa, Masahiro Komoto, Shuntaro Miyao	Costume drama		
3 July	Alien vs Ninja	Seiji Chiba	Masanori Mimoto, Shuji Kashiwabara, Donpei Tsuchihira	Martial Arts Science Fiction Comedy		
17 July	Arrietty	Hiromasa Yonebayashi		Anime		
4 September	Beck	Yukihiko Tsutsumi	Hiro Mizushima, Takeru Satoh, Kenta Kiritani			
24 October	Birthright	Naoki Hashimoto	Sayoko Oho, Miyu Yagyu, Ryoko Takizawa	Horror		
5 June	Black Rat	Kenta Fukasaku	Misaki Yonemura, Hiroya Matsumoto, Rina Saito			
4 December	Bleach: Hell Verse			Anime		
1 May	Book Girl			Anime	Based on a light novel	
22 May	Box!	Toshio Lee	Hayato Ichihara, Kengo Kora, Mitsuki Tanimura	Sports drama		
31 July	A Boy and His Samurai	Yoshihiro Nakamura	Ryo Nishikido, Rie Tomosaka, Fuku Suzuki, Hiroki Konno		Based on a manga	
15 February	Caterpillar	Kōji Wakamatsu	Shinobu Terajima	War		
7 September	Cold Fish	Sion Sono	Mitsuru Fukikoshi, Denden, Asuka Kurosawa	Thriller		
21 August	Colorful	Keiichi Hara		Anime		
5 June	Confessions	Tetsuya Nakashima	Takako Matsu	Thriller		
	Dancing Chaplin	Masayuki Suo	Luigo Bonino, Tamiyo Kusakari, Roland Petit	Documentary		
17 April	Detective Conan: The Lost Ship in the Sky			Anime		
6 February	The Disappearance of Haruhi Suzumiya	Tatsuya Ishihara, Yasuhiro Takemoto	Aya Hirano, Tomokazu Sugita, Minori Chihara, Yūko Gotō; Daisuke Ono	Anime	Based on a light novel	
6 March	Doraemon: Nobita's Great Battle of the Mermaid King			Anime		
13 March	Eden of the East: Paradise Lost	Kenji Kamiyama		Anime		
23 January	Fate/stay night: Unlimited Blade Works	Yūji Yamaguchi	Noriaki Sugiyama, Ayako Kawasumi, Kana Ueda	Anime		
30 October	Garo: Red Requiem	Keita Amemiya	Ryosei Konishi, Mary Matsuyama, Yôsuke Saitô	Fantasy		
20 November	GeGeGe no Nyōbō	Takuji Suzuki	Kazue Fukiishi, Kankurō Kudō		Based on a book	
4 September	Gothic & Lolita Psycho	Go Ohara	Rina Akiyama	Action		
21 August	Hanamizuki	Nobuhiro Doi	Yui Aragaki, Toma Ikuta, Misako Renbutsu	Romance		
3 April	Hanbun no Tsuki ga Noboru Sora	Yoshihiro Fukagawa			Based on a light novel	
22 May	Haru's Journey	Masahiro Kobayashi	Tatsuya Nakadai, Eri Tokunaga, Hideji Otaki	Road		
2 October	Heaven's Story	Takahisa Zeze	Moeki Tsuruoka, Tomoharu Hasegawa, Shugo Oshinari	Drama		
28 September	Helldriver	Yoshihiro Nishimura	Yumiko Hara, Eihi Shiina, Yurei Yanagi	Splatter		
4 September	Here Comes the Bride, My Mom!	Mipo Oh	Shinobu Otake, Aoi Miyazaki, Kenta Kiritani			
9 January	Higanjima: Escape from Vampire Island	Kim Tae-kyun	Koji Yamamoto, Miori Takimoto	Horror		
	Hospitalité	Koji Fukada	Kenji Yamauchi, Kiki Sugino, Kanji Furutachi	Black comedy		
	Hot as Hell: The Deadbeat March	Yosuke Okuda	Itabashi Shunya, Waki Katakura, Kenraku Tamura	Crime comedy-drama		
31 July	Hutch the Honeybee	Tetsurō Amino		Anime		
23 December	Inazuma Eleven: Saikyō Gundan Ōgre Shūrai			Anime		
25 October	Into the White Night	Yoshihiro Fukagawa	Maki Horikita, Kengo Kora, Eiichiro Funakoshi	Crime		
25 September	Kimi ni Todoke	Naoto Kumazawa	Mikako Tabe, Haruma Miura	Romance, Drama		
3 April	Kakera: A Piece of Our Life		Hikari Mitsushima, Eriko Nakamura			
15 May	Ongakubito	Hidetaka Itō	Kazuma Sano, Mirei Kiritani	Romance		
22 May; 5 June; 19 July	Kamen Rider × Kamen Rider × Kamen Rider The Movie: Cho-Den-O Trilogy	Osamu Kaneda, Kenzō Maihara, Takayuki Shibasaki	Yuichi Nakamura, Dori Sakurada, Kimito Totani			
7 August	Kamen Rider W Forever: A to Z/The Gaia Memories of Fate	Koichi Sakamoto	Renn Kiriyama, Masaki Suda, Hikaru Yamamoto, Minehiro Kinomoto, Mitsuru Matsuoka, Genki Sudo, Aya Sugimoto			
18 December	Kamen Rider × Kamen Rider OOO & W Featuring Skull: Movie War Core		Renn Kiriyama, Masaki Suda, Hikaru Yamamoto, Minehiro Kinomoto, Kikkawa Koji, Shu Watanabe			
14 August	Kinako	Yoshinori Kobayashi		Comedy	Based on a true story	
1 May	King of Thorn	Kazuyoshi Katayama		Anime		
10 July	Kyōfu	Hiroshi Takahashi	Mana Fujii, Yuri Nakamura, Nagisa Katahira	Horror		
	The Lady Shogun and Her Men	Fuminori Kaneko	Kazunari Ninomiya, Ko Shibasaki, Maki Horikita	Costume fantasy drama		
4 December	Light Novel no Tanoshii Kakikata	Kenichi Ōmori	Maasa Sudo, Hisanori Satō, Ayana Taketatsu		Based on a light novel	
22 October	The Lightning Tree	Ryuichi Hiroki	Masaki Okada, Yū Aoi, Keisuke Koide	Costume romance		
4 September	Love & Loathing & Lulu & Ayano	Hisayasu Satō	Norie Yasui, Mayu Sakuma	Drama	Based on a novel	
6 November	Maria-sama ga Miteru		Honoka Miki, Haru		Based on a light novel	
18 September	Mobile Suit Gundam 00 the Movie: Awakening of the Trailblazer			Anime		
22 May	Mutant Girls Squad	Noboru Iguchi, Yoshihiro Nishimura, Tak Sakaguchi	Yumi Sugimoto, Yuko Takayama, Suzuka Morita	Splatter		
31 July	Naruto Shippūden 4: The Lost Tower			Anime		
2 September	Norwegian Wood	Tran Anh Hung	Kenichi Matsuyama, Rinko Kikuchi, Kiko Mizuhara	Drama		
1 October	Ōoku	Fuminori Kaneko				
30 January	Otōto	Yoji Yamada	Sayuri Yoshinaga Tsurube Shofukutei Yū Aoi		Special screening at the 60th Berlin International Film Festival	
17 May	Outrage	Takeshi Kitano	Takeshi Kitano, Kippei Shiina, Ryo Kase	Gangster black comedy		
20 November	Paranormal Activity: Tokyo Night	Toshikazu Nagae	Aoi Nakamura, Noriko Aoyama, Ayako Yoshitani	Horror		
10 July	Phantom Ruler: Zoroark	Kunihiko Yuyama	Rica Matsumoto, Megumi Toyoguchi, Yūji Ueda, Ikue Ōtani	Anime		
22 May	Planzet	Jun Awazu		Anime; Science fiction		
29 May	Railways	Yoshinari Nishikori	Kiichi Nakai, Reiko Takashima	Drama		
9 October	Redline	Takeshi Koike		Anime		
30 January	Samurai Sentai Shinkenger vs. Go-onger: GinmakuBang!!	Shōjirō Nakazawa	Tori Matsuzaka, Hiroki Aiba, Rin Takanashi, Shogo Suzuki, Suzuka Morita, Keisuke Sohma			
26 June	Sankaku	Keisuke Yoshida	Sousuke Takaoka, Tomoko Tabata, Erena Ono			
29 April	Scott Pilgrim vs. the World	Edgar Wright	Michael Cera, Mary Elizabeth Winstead, Ellen Wong, Kieran Culkin		Based on the comic books. A UK-USA-Japan co-production.	
15 May	Shodo Girls!!	Ryuichi Inomata	Riko Narumi	Teen	Based on a true story	
18 December	Sketches of Kaitan City	Kazuyoshi Kumakiri	Mitsuki Tanimura, Pistol Takehara, Ryo Kase		Based on a collected short story series	
3 April	Solanin	Takahiro Miki	Aoi Miyazaki		Based on a manga	
1 December	Space Battleship Yamato	Takashi Yamazaki	Meisa Kuroki			
30 January	Takumi-kun Series: Bibō no Detail	Kenji Yokoi	Kyousuke Hamao, Daisuke Watanabe		Based on Takumi-kun: Bibō no Detail	
7 August	Tensou Sentai Goseiger: Epic on the Movie					
22 May	Tetsuo: The Bullet Man	Shinya Tsukamoto	Eric Bossick, Akiko Monō, Shinya Tsukamoto			
25 September	Thirteen Assassins	Takashi Miike	Kōji Yakusho, Takayuki Yamada, Yusuke Iseya	Costume martial arts	Japan-UK co-production	
23 December	Ultraman Zero The Movie: Super Deciding Fight! The Belial Galactic Empire	Yuichi Abe	Yu Koyanagi, Tatsuomi Hamada, Tao Tsuchiya			
18 February	Welcome to the Space Show	Koji Masunari		Anime	Premiered at the Berlin International Film Festival prior to nationwide release	
23 January	Yu-Gi-Oh! 3D: Bonds Beyond Time		Shunsuke Kazama, Kenn, Yuya Miyashita, Atsushi Tamura	Anime		
8 May	Yuriko's Aroma	Kōta Yoshida	Noriko Eguchi, Shōta Sometani, Saori Hara	Erotic comedy drama		
1 May	Zebraman: Vengeful Zebra City	Takashi Miike				
