= Kyoto Elegy =

- Directed by: Kiki Sugino
- Written by: Kotaro Wajima
- Produced by: Naofumi Nakamura; Kiki Sugino
- Starring: Takahiro Miura; Kiki Sugino; Eri Tokunaga; Chisun; Shima Ohnishi; Taiga Nakano; Yuko Miyamoto; Seiki Nagahara; Yoshimi Tokui
- Cinematography: Kenji Takama
- Edited by: Lee Chatametikool
- Music by: Seigan Tominomori
- Production companies: Yoshimoto Kogyo; Wa Entertainment
- Distributed by: Wa Entertainment; Katsu-Do
- Release date: 13 February 2016
- Running time: 94 minutes
- Country: Japan
- Language: Japanese

Kyoto Elegy (Japanese: マンガ肉と僕) is a 2014 Japanese black comedy-drama film directed by Kiki Sugino, starring Takahiro Miura, Sugino, Eri Tokunaga and Chisun. Sugino's directorial debut, it is an adaptation of the Shiki Asaka novel Manga Meat and Me and follows a university student and his relationships with three women.

== Cast ==
- Takahiro Miura as Watabe
- Kiki Sugino as Satomi Kumahori
- Eri Tokunaga as Nako
- Chisun as Sayaka
- Shima Ohnishi
- Taiga Nakano
- Yuko Miyamoto
- Seiki Nagahara
- Yoshimi Tokui

== Production ==
In September 2013, it was announced that actress and producer Kiki Sugino, who was then reputed as a "muse of Asian independent cinema", was to make her directorial debut with Kyoto Elegy, an adaptation of the R-18 Literary Award by Women for Women-Shiki Asaka's winning novel Manga Meat and Me, which also served as the film's title in Japanese. It was to be the third entry in the R-18 Literary Award series of film adaptations of novels which had won that award. Production company Yoshimoto Kogyo had approached her to direct a film after she had received the Best New Creator and Best Actress awards at the New Creator section of the Okinawa International Movie Festival. Sugino had previously been encouraged to take up filmmaking by Kim Ki-duk while studying in South Korea. In addition to directing, she was also to serve as the producer and star as the female lead, Satomi. Though the initial plan was to cast a comedian from Yoshimoto in the role, Sugino "personally felt a connection" to the character and volunteered. The film was to revolve around the theme of "women who resist men," with the works of Kenji Mizoguchi serving as a major influence. The film's English title, Kyoto Elegy, references the Mizugochi film Osaka Elegy. Takahiro Miura, Eri Tokunaga and Chisun were cast as the protagonist Watabe, the female 'co-heroine' Nako, and Sayaka, the third woman who enters Watabe's life, respectively. Sugino had approached Miura and Tokunaga as she was a fan of their performances in Tokyo Playboy Club and Haru's Journey, respectively. The rest of the cast was to include Shima Ohnishi, Taiga Nakano, Yuko Miyamoto, Seiki Nagahara and Yoshimi Tokui. The cinematographer was Kenji Takama, and Kazuyoshi Okuyama was the executive producer.

The screenplay was written by Kotaro Wajima. Set in Kyoto, it was to follow Watabe, a 'loser', over a period of 8 years. It begins with him studying law in university shortly after the 2011 Tōhoku earthquake and tsunami. Struggling to fit in, he meets Satomi, a fellow student who is overweight, is ridiculed by her peers as a result and soon turns to leeching off of him. He then meets Nako through his part-time job and falls in love with her. Years down the line in 2014, his relationship with Nako is troubled, and he ends it 'brutally' when he meets Sayaka, a fellow law student. Several more years pass before Sayaka has far outshone Watabe and a much slimmer Satomi reenters Watabe's life in 2019. Satomi, Nako and Sayaka were written to represent the present, past and future, respectively. Though Watabe does experience personal growth over the course of the film, Sugino wished to emphasise that this growth was not "necessarily in a good direction" and that this was something that men "shouldn't end up like." Sugino wished to "create a visually striking location for the memorable scenes where the characters are at a crossroads but are made to realize that they must continue living." Though the source material is set in Asagaya and elsewhere in Tokyo, Sugino chose to set the film in Kyoto as she felt that the city was where "history has accumulated" and thus one could "feel the emotions and currents of the people just by being there." Additionally, she felt that "a bit inorganic", which did not align with her want to "express the surge of human emotions". Kyoto's rivers and bridges feature prominently as they were "important in depicting the turning point in people's lives and how they choose their path." Sugino decided that every character apart from Watabe should speak in the Kansai dialect as well. She claimed to have first considered put on about 30kg to play Satomi, though she decided on using special effects makeup instead.

Principal photography took place in Kyoto over 11 days in September 2013. As a director, Sugino sought to "capture images of women from the past, present, and future, along with the beautiful scenery of Kyoto." For her role as Satomi, she would have spend nearly three hours daily applying special effects makeup for about four days straight, which was made "quite challenging" by the city's warm climate at the time. In this period, she received very little sleep, waking up at 3 a.m. to apply the makeup. to Miura claimed to have lost 7-8kg to fit the description of Watabe as having "thin legs". The titular 'manga meat' was commissioned from a local catering company. While on set, Nagahara reportedly "came up with ad-libs left and right and really livened things up."

== Release ==
The film had a "special premiere" on 18 October 2014 at the Aeon Cinema Kyoto Katsuragawa as part of the Kyoto Independent Film Festival. This was followed by an official premiere at the TOHO Cinemas Roppongi Hills as part of the Asian Future section of the 27th Tokyo International Film Festival on 26 October. It screened at the Sakurazaka Theater on 26 March 2015 as part of the 7th Okinawa International Movie Festival. The film received a theatrical release in 2016. A preview screening was held at the K's Cinema in Shinjuku on 11 February before it opened in theatres nationwide on 13 February.

== Reception ==
Naofumi Higuchi of Yahoo! Japan lauded the cinematography, the direction and the performances of Miura and Sugino and concluded that in "every sense it's a fun debut feature film." Tatsuya Masuto of Cinema+ felt that it was "powerful and poignant" and "with a strange charm", opining that women who watched the film were more likely to "perceive it as a 'black comedy,'" while men were more likely to view it as "too dark for a comedy!" He wrote that the film "allows viewers to experience her unique qualities in a fresher, more vibrant way." Masaki Endo of Manichi Kirei agreed that the film was poignant, particularly in its depiction of how "one's feelings are often one-sided when it comes to encounters with others, how people get hurt or unhappy, or how others don't meet expectations in appearance or reaction." He wrote: "As a man, I felt like I'd been hit with a counter-attack after watching it."

Reviewing the film at the Tokyo International Film Festival, Robbie Collin of The Daily Telegraph opined that while the film occasionally "loses its nerve", it is a "confident, disciplined, hugely promising debut." Mark Adams of Screen Daily agreed that it was an "impressive" debut, and though it does "veer into melodrama at times", he felt that it was "elegantly shot" with the three women around Watabe being "far more interesting and complex". P'eng Hsiao-fen of China Daily praised the cinematography, the editing and the sound design and felt that the film "boasts a rich storyline and expansive scenery."

Haruhiko Kamijima of Kinema Junpo gave the film a 3/5 star rating. Kamijima felt that it was "wonderful and well worth seeing", opining that the "only regrettable thing is that the story becomes a bit monotonous because all three women are given equal attention." Reiko Kitagawa and Morumotto Yoshida, also of Kinema Junpo, were more negative, each rating the film 2/5 stars, with the latter writing that the film "simply omits the process of how the relationships break down, and the gaps are not shown beyond what is explained in the dialogue, so the man's jealousy and envy are not understood."
