= Town Without Sea =

- Directed by: Elaiza Ikeda
- Written by: Yuko Shimoda
- Produced by: Kazuo Mitani
- Starring: Yuki Kura; Roi Ishiuchi; Nari Saito; Ken'ichi Abe; Kiki Sugino; Masaji Otsuka; Kengo Kora; Lily Franky; Hideko Hara
- Cinematography: Takahiro Imai
- Edited by: Anne Luc
- Music by: Hiroyuki Nishiyama
- Production company: eiga24ku
- Distributed by: Kinema Junposha eiga24ku
- Release date: 4 December 2020
- Running time: 105 minutes
- Country: Japan
- Language: Japanese

Town Without Sea (Japanese: 夏、至るころ) is a 2020 Japanese coming-of-age drama film directed by Elaiza Ikeda, starring Yuki Kura, Roi Ishiuchi and Nari Saito. Ikeda's directorial debut, it follows two childhood friends in their last year of high school as they deliberate their future and what happiness means for them. Set in Tagawa, Fukuoka, it is the second entry in the Our Recipe Encyclopedia series of locally-produced films, a project of eiga24ku.

== Cast ==
- Yuki Kura as Sho Onuma
- Roi Ishiuchi as Taiga Hirakawa
- Nari Saito as Miyako
- Ken'ichi Abe as Naoyuki Onuma
- Kiki Sugino as Yukari Onuma
- Masaji Otsuka as Arita
- Kengo Kora as Professor Kobayashi
- Lily Franky as Masakatsu Koga
- Hideko Hara as Haruko Koga
- Naritaka Goto as Noboru Onuma

== Production ==
Actress and model Elaiza Ikeda announced in March 2019 that she would be making her directorial debut with Town Without Sea, a coming-of-age drama produced by the film production company eiga24ku as the second entry in its Our Recipe Encyclopedia series centring around the themes of "region," "food," and "high school students". As part of this project, the company worked with the local governments of the parts of Japan in which the films were set. The first entry had been Mana Yasuda's 36.8 °C, released in 2017. Ikeda was also placed in charge of planning and coming up with the story for the film, which was to be set in the city of Tagawa in Fukuoka Prefecture. Ikeda, a resident of Fukuoka who was otherwise unconnected to Tagawa, had been approached by producer Kazuo Mitani several months prior in 2018 to direct an entry for the project, having read an interview in which she had expressed interest in directing. She claimed to have been more interested in filmmaking than acting. He believed that she possessed the "spirit of craftsmanship," and he additionally wished to push forth the notion that people "should be freer and more ambitious in creating things, without being bound by preconceived notions about their current job or position", noting that there were then few actresses in Japan who also took on directing and producing roles. Ikeda quickly accepted the offer, feeling that it was a "no-brainer", especially once she had received the support of her agency. Auditions were held in Fukuoka, Miyagi, Tokyo, Nagasaki and Kumamoto shortly after.

The screenplay was written by Yuko Shimoda, who had previously worked on several television dramas in which Ikeda appeared, over the course of several months. This was Shimoda's first screenplay for a feature film. Shimoda, as well as cinematographer Takahiro Imai and sound engineer Shinnosuke Komoda, the latter of whom had previously worked with her and was also a Fukuoka native, as well as the composer and the lighting technician. To prepare, she and Ikeda travelled to Tagawa to come out for ideas for the story, interviewing the city's high school students, people in their 20s and parents in the process. The film was to centre around Sho Omura, a teenager in his final year of high school with a passion for taiko drumming and who is unsure of his future and what he wants to do in life. When his best friend and fellow drummer Taiga announces that he will quit drumming to focus on his studies and work towards becoming a civil servant, Sho is thrown into a loop, having always had Taiga by his side such that he had not envisioned a future without him in it. It was to follow Sho and Taiga over the summer as they meet a mysterious girl named Miyako, who arrives in Tagawa with a guitar, having abandoned her dreams of becoming a singer in Tokyo.

The character Taiga was based on a middle school student Ikeda had interviewed who wanted to be a civil servant simply because it would "be better to have a stable job" and "it would make his mother happy." Sho was instead written to "complement" Taiga as a "microcosm of modern society, a type of kid that is common today." A rough draft was then written based on the concept of a kid who had Taiga as a best friend, and how they could "inspire" each other. In planning and writing the script, Ikeda and Shimoda wished to "capture the moment when the hearts of these two high school students are captivated by the magic of summer and the world becomes more colorful", as well as to be "close to the moment when unforgettable memories are born." This resulted in the film's Japanese title, Summer, When it Arrives. Ikeda decided to incorporate taiko drumming into the plot as she "felt a kind of blood or heartbeat flowing through" Tagawa, which reminded her of the instrument.

It was announced in August that Yuki Kura had been cast as Sho, while Roi Ishiuchi and Nari Saito had been cast as Taiga and Miyako, respectively. This was Kura's first leading role and Ishiuchi's first acting role. Ken'ichi Abe and Kiki Sugino were cast as Sho's parents, while Lily Franky and Hideko Hara were cast as his grandparents. Musician Masaji Otsuka was cast as the owner of the local pet shop. Kengo Kora was cast as Professor Kobayashi, who provides guidance to Sho. The film's theme song, Tadaimato Ieba, was written, composed and sung by Soushi Sakayama, whom Ikeda had directly approached.

Principal photography began in Tagawa in mid-August, shortly after shooting had wrapped for the J-drama series Followers, in which Ikeda had starred. While on that set, she had observed Mika Ninagawa's direction and applied what she had learnt through that experience to directing Town Without Sea. To prepare for the role, Kura and Roi attended a taiko drumming residential training camp in Tagawa in the two weeks before filming began. In that time, Kura also practiced the local dialect Ikeda felt that Tagawa was "very well-suited for filmmaking", enabling her to "film freely wherever [she] wanted."

== Release ==
It was announced in January 2020 that the film was set to be released in theatres nationwide sometime later that year. The film premiered at the Cinema Fest section of the 21st edition of the Jeonju International Film Festival, held from 28 May to 6 June. Attendance at the event was restricted to just jury members and those involved in the film's production due to the then-ongoing COVID-19 pandemic. It then screened at the 23rd Shanghai International Film Festival, held from 25 July to 2 August as the "first major international film festival to be held in China since the global spread of the coronavirus." The film was released in theatres nationwide "sequentially" from 4 December. It had its North American premiere at the Japan Cuts film festival, held in New York City from late August to September 2021, though it was only screened online.

The film received a DVD release on 2 July 2021, with bonus features including behind-the-scenes footage, interviews with the cast and crew and a deleted scene.

== Reception ==
Naofumi Higuchi of Yahoo! Japan proclaimed the film a "meticulously crafted work" that "never becomes overly stoic; the methodological tension and sense of liberation are blended in an exquisite balance," with "delicately thought-out cinematic shots that create a sense of dignity". Masato Isagai of Movie Walker Press considered the film a "must-see", lauding the performances, the "daring" cinematography, the sound design and the climax, and felt that the "fact that it made [him] want to visit Tagawa" was "proof" of its success. Critics from Cinema Journal likewise praised the cast in addition to Ikeda's direction. Ayumi Yamada of Cinemarche highlighted the performances of Kura, Ishiuchi, Franky, Hara and Kora, concluding that the film "may not resonate with everyone's adolescence, but those who have experienced vague anxieties and struggles with their own identity will likely find something to relate to." Maya Owada of Real Sound felt that the film was able to "recreate a truly authentic summer atmosphere", and that, in viewing it, she was "finally able to touch upon the sensibility of Ikeda".

Film critic Kiichiro Yanashita opined that Ikeda's direction was "surprisingly solid", displaying several features typical of actors who transition to filmmaking such as "unnecessarily long" nature scenes and the tendency to "carefully showcase the actors' performances and cherish the atmosphere." He also felt that the "straightforward" film had a "hint of BL" and would not be out of place at the Pia Film Festival. Yuri Saruwatari of Cinema Today rated the film 3 stars out of 5, opining that it was "moving" and naming the scenes depicting Sho's drumming, summer festivals and town diners as highlights. However, she felt that the film was "overly intellectual" and that it "[tried] too hard", thus "[leaving] no room for the audience to grasp the theme for themselves." She also criticised the screenwriting for lines that were "out of place and are bothersome", and pointed out that the word 'happiness' was uttered "about 100 times by every single character".

Reviewing the film at Japan Cuts, Rouven Linnarz of Asian Movie Pulse lauded the performances of Yuka and Ishiuchi, their "believable" chemistry and the development of their characters, though he noted that the side characters were "essentially stations" on that development. He found the film to be "rather enjoyable" despite its "light" tone and opined that the way it "deals with issues such as friendship and family is quite profound". Chiara Spagnoli Gabardi of Cinema Daily praised Ikeda's "impressive dexterity with camera shots and sense of staging", as well as the "whimsical" production design. However, she criticised the pacing and noted that the "cliche pubescence themes are conveyed in a scattered and unoriginal way", finding that Ikeda provided "subtle philosophical touches, that could have been further expanded."

For her work on the film, Ikeda received the ELLE Girl New Director Award at the Elle Cinema Awards 2020. Kura received the Best New Actor Award at the Osaka Cinema Fest 2022 for his role as Sho.
