= Harmonium (film) =

2016 film

- Film poster
- Directed by: Kōji Fukada
- Written by: Kōji Fukada
- Starring: Tadanobu Asano; Mariko Tsutsui; Kanji Furutachi
- Release dates: 14 May 2016 (Cannes); 8 October 2016 (Japan)
- Running time: 118 minutes
- Country: Japan
- Language: Japanese

Harmonium (Japanese: 淵に立つ, Hepburn: Fuchi ni Tatsu) is a 2016 Japanese drama film directed by Kōji Fukada. It was screened in the Un Certain Regard section at the 2016 Cannes Film Festival where it won the Jury Prize.

== Plot ==
Toshio (Furutachi), his wife Akie (Tsutsui), and their daughter Hotaru (Shinokawa) live a banal existence. Toshio operates a machine shop in his garage when suddenly an old acquaintance of Toshio's, Yasaka (Asano) arrives to help out at the shop. Hotaru practices the harmonium but is obviously a novice. Yasaka, who always wears white, had just been released from prison and so without a permanent place to stay, Toshio takes him in as an assistant. Yasaka bonds with Hotaru, helping her with her music, and being helpful around the shop and house. Yasaka reveals to Akie that he was imprisoned for eleven years as a result of murder, asks for forgiveness for not mentioning this earlier, and slowly Yasaka becomes a greater part of the family. Yasaka and Akie have some romantic feelings for each other, and kiss each other at several points. Toshio becomes suspicious about them as the family goes on a river trip. The movie also reveals that Yasaka is bitter about taking the blame for the murder, which Toshio participated in.

At this point in the film, Toshio removes his white clothes, revealing a red shirt underneath, which he wears for the rest of the film. Later, when Toshio is out of the house, Yasaka oversteps his bounds trying to have sex with Akie, who pushes him away. After this, he goes for a walk and sees Hotaru. Later, Toshio finds Hotaru, injured and unresponsive, with Yasaka standing over her. Yasaka stands, shouting Toshio's name repeatedly, but Toshio does not respond as he is preoccupied with his daughter. Yasaka then walks off and disappears.

Eight years later, Toshio hires a new assistant, Takashi (Taiga). Takashi was raised by a single mother and takes some interest in the now disabled and non-verbal Hotaru, sketching her. Akie has become extremely protective of her daughter. Takashi reveals separately to Toshio and Akie that he is the illegitimate son of Yasaka, that Yasaka was a member of the yakuza, and that he wanted to be employed by Toshio based on letters Yasaka sent to his mother before he disappeared. After Takashi stands too close to Hotaru, Akie kicks him out of the house. Akie confronts Toshio about his involvement in the murder, and he admits to having helped hold the victim down while Yasaka strangled him. Later, Toshio receives a tip on the location of Yasaka, and Akie and Toshio take Takashi to kill him in front of his father. Takashi offers himself willingly, which is rejected by the pair. The tip turns out to be false, as the person only vaguely resembles Yasaka. Having reached her breaking point, Akie takes Hotaru to a bridge. After imagining an image of Yasaka standing on the bridge and smiling at her, Akie jumped off the bridge along with Hotaru. Toshio pulls an unconscious Akie out of the water, while Takashi apparently pulls Hotaru out, with both of them also unconscious along the side of the river. Akie regains consciousness, and a panicked Toshio tries resuscitate first Takashi, then Hotaru. The film ends with Toshio continuing to attempt to resuscitate Hotaru, with both her fate and that of Takashi left ambiguous.

== Cast ==
- Tadanobu Asano
- Mariko Tsutsui
- Kanji Furutachi
- Taiga
- Takahiro Miura
- Momone Shinokawa

== Awards ==
Year	Award ceremony	Category	Recipients	Result
2016	Cannes Film Festival	Un Certain Regard Jury Prize	Harmonium	Won
2017	11th Asian Film Awards	Best Film	Harmonium	Nominated
2017	11th Asian Film Awards	Best Director	Koji Fukada	Nominated
2017	11th Asian Film Awards	Best Actor	Tadanobu Asano	Won
2017	Mainichi Film Concours	Best Actress	Mariko Tsutsui	Won
