= Love Life (2022 film) =

2022 film by Kōji Fukada

- Japanese theatrical release poster
- Japanese: LOVE LIFE
- Directed by: Koji Fukada
- Screenplay by: Koji Fukada
- Based on: "Love Life" by Akiko Yano
- Produced by: Yasuhiko Hattori; Masa Sawada; Yuko Kameda; Tomotake Hasumi
- Starring: Fumino Kimura; Kento Nagayama; Atom Sunada; Hirona Yamazaki; Tetta Shimada; Natsume Mito; Misuzu Kanno; Tomorowo Taguchi
- Cinematography: Hideo Yamamoto
- Edited by: Sylvie Lager; Koji Fukada
- Music by: Olivier Goinard
- Production companies: Nagoya TV; Chipangu; Comme des Cinémas
- Distributed by: Elephant House (Japan); Art House (France)
- Release dates: 5 September 2022 (Venice); 9 September 2022 (Japan); 14 June 2023 (France)
- Running time: 123 minutes
- Countries: Japan; France
- Languages: Japanese; Korean Sign Language; Korean
- Box office: est. US$685,331

Love Life is a 2022 drama film written and directed by Koji Fukada. Set in contemporary Japan, the film is inspired by the 1991 song "Love Life" by Akiko Yano, originally released on the album of the same name in 1991. In 2000, the singer Hitomi had released an eponym album on AvexTrax records. It revolves around Taeko and her husband Jiro facing "love" and "life".

The film was selected 'In competition' section of 79th Venice International Film Festival, where it competed for Golden Lion award and had its premiere on 5 September 2022.

== Synopsis ==
The film follows a married woman, Taeko, who lives happily with her husband, Jiro. She decides to care for long-lost Park, father of her son Keita, when Park reappears deaf, ill, and homeless.

== Cast ==
- Fumino Kimura as Taeko Osawa
- Kento Nagayama as Jiro Osawa
- Atom Sunada as Park Shinji, Taeko's ex-husband and Keita's father
- Hirona Yamazaki as Risa Yamazaki, Jiro's ex-girlfriend
- Misuzu Kanno as Akie Osawa, Jiro's mother
- Tomorowo Taguchi as Makoto Osawa, Jiro's father
- Tetta Shimada as Keita Shinji, Park and Taeko's son
- Mito Natsume as Yoko Kondo, a staff member who works in the same place as Taeko

== Release ==
The film had its world premiere at the 79th Venice International Film Festival on 5 September 2022, and competed for Golden Lion in 'In competition' section. It was released in Japan on 9 September 2022, and held its North American premiere at 2022 Toronto International Film Festival in 'Contemporary World Cinema' section on 12 September 2022 at Scotiabank Theatre, Toronto. MK2 Films have taken the distribution rights of the film for Europe in February 2022. It also made it to 'A Window on Asian Cinema' section of 27th Busan International Film Festival and was screened on October 6, 2022.

== Reception ==
On the review aggregator Rotten Tomatoes, the film has an approval rating of 85% based on 13 reviews, with an average rating of 6.50/10.

Guy Lodge of Variety wrote: "While it's impossible not to be affected at some level by its characters' hellish plight, the predominant softness of tone here tends toward the wispy." David Ehrlich of IndieWire graded the film with B+ and wrote, "An enormously poignant melodrama told at the volume of a broken whisper, Kōji Fukada’s Love Life represents a major breakthrough for a filmmaker who's found the perfect story for his probing but distant style."

== Awards and nominations ==
| Award | Category | Recipient(s) | Result | Ref. |
|---|---|---|---|---|
| 47th Hochi Film Awards | Best Picture | Love Life | Nominated | |
| 47th Hochi Film Awards | Best Director | Koji Fukada | Nominated | |
| 47th Hochi Film Awards | Best Actress | Fumino Kimura | Nominated | |
