= Kiki Sugino =

Japanese actress (born 1984)

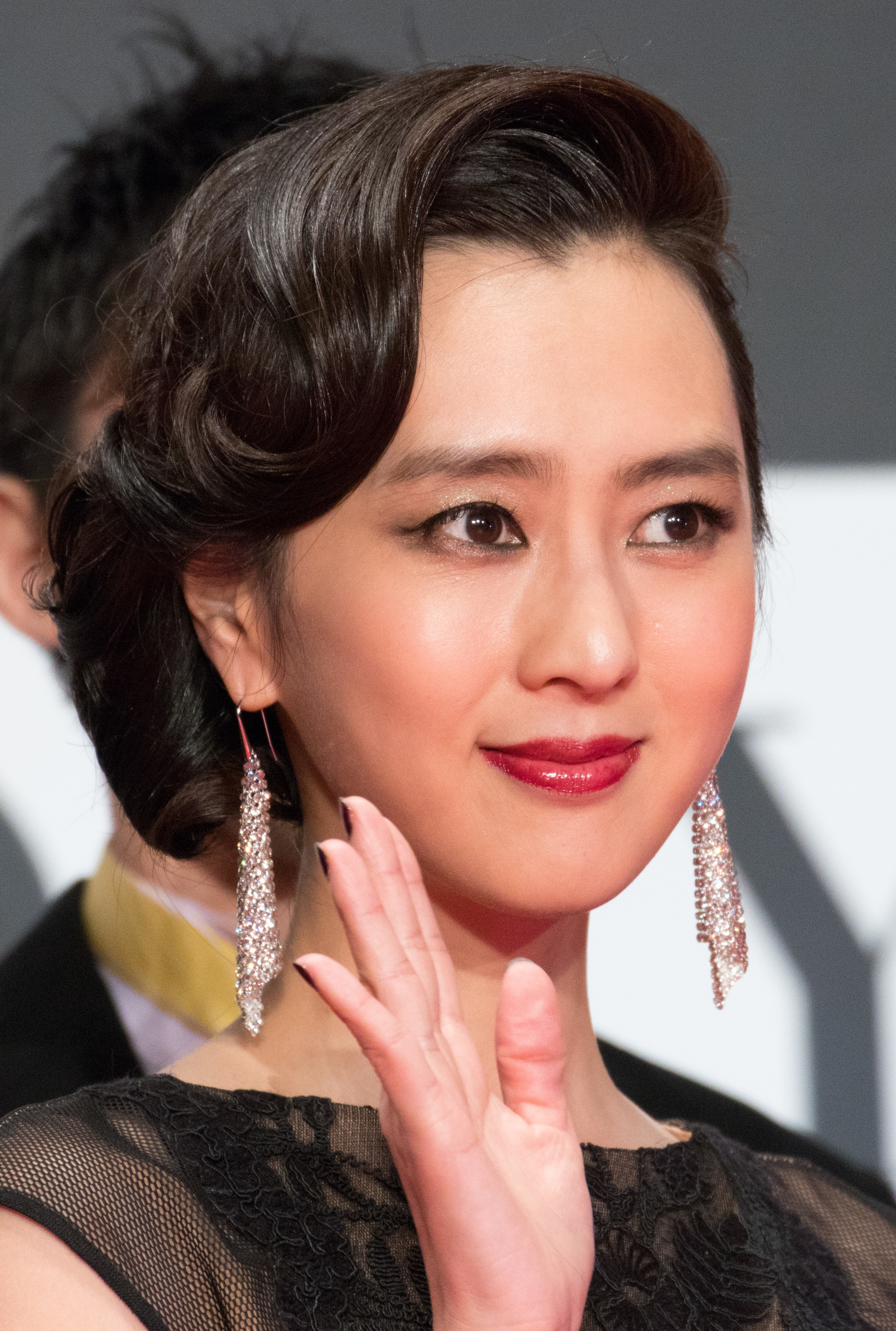
- Sugino in 2016 at the premiere of Snow Woman
- Born: March 12, 1984 (age 42); Hiroshima, Japan
- Occupations: Actor; Producer; Film director Screenwriter

Kiki Sugino (杉野希妃, Sugino Kiki; born March 12, 1984) is a Japanese actress, writer, producer and film director. She has produced over ten films and acted in such movies as Hospitalité, Chigasaki Story and Snow Woman. In 2014 she directed the film Yokudō which later went on to win awards at the Tallinn Black Nights Film Festival and the Hong Kong Asian Film Festival.

== Biography ==
Sugino was born in Hiroshima in 1984 to a family of Korean descent. She studied Economics at Keio University and traveled to South Korea as an exchange student where she appeared in her first film One Shining Day. In 2010 Sugino worked with Japanese director Koji Fukada to produce and act in the comedy film Hospitalité which won an award at the Tokyo International Film Festival and was screened at nearly 100 film festivals internationally.

Sugino made her directorial debut in 2014 with the comedy film Kyoto Elegy which was shot in just eleven days and premiered at the Tokyo International Film Festival to positive reviews. Two years later she directed the film Snow Woman, a retelling of the Japanese folklore tale Yuki-onna.

== Filmography ==
=== As director ===
Year	Title	Ref.
2014	Yokudō	
2014	Short Plays	
2014	Kyoto Elegy	
2016	Snow Woman	

=== As actress ===
Year	Title	Role	Ref.
2010	Hospitalité	Natsuki	
2014	Yokudō	Kumi	
2016	Snow Woman	Snow Woman (Yuki-Onna)	
2019	21st Century Girl		
2019	A Picture with Yuki	Yuki	
2020	Town Without Sea	Yukari	
2020	I Want to Be Loved	Tomoyo	
2021	Love Mooning	Ayako Mizuno	
