= Chigasaki Story =

- Film poster
- ３泊４日、５時の鐘
- Directed by: Takuya Misawa
- Written by: Takuya Misawa
- Produced by: Takuya Misawa; Hayate Matsuzaki; Kousuke Ono; Yuuka Osaki
- Starring: Haya Nakazaki; Ena Koshino; Kiki Sugino; Natusko Hori; Juri Fukushima
- Cinematography: Shogo Ueno
- Edited by: Daisuke Hasebi
- Music by: Eiji Iwanoto
- Production company: Wa Entertainment
- Release date: 9 December 2014 (SGIFF)
- Running time: 88 minutes
- Country: Japan
- Language: Japanese

Chigasaki Story (３泊４日、５時の鐘, 3-paku 4-ka 5-ji no kane) is a 2014 Japanese romantic comedy-drama film written and directed by Takuya Misawa. Haya Nakazaki, Ena Koshino, Kiki Sugino, Natusko Hori, and Juri Fukushima star as guests whose lives intersect at a resort in Chigasaki, Kanagawa.

== Plot ==
The lives of several guests intersect at a resort in Chigasaki, Kanagawa, Japan.

== Cast ==
- Haya Nakazaki as Tomoharu
- Ena Koshino as Karin
- Kiki Sugino as Maki
- Natusko Hori as Risa
- Juri Fukushima as Ayako
- Satoshi Nikaido as Professor Kondo

== Release ==
Chigasaki Story premiered at the Singapore International Film Festival on 9 December 2014.

== Reception ==
Derek Elley of Film Business Asia rated it 8/10 stars and wrote that the "remarkably assured comedy of manners is an impressive writing-directing debut". Clarence Tsui of The Hollywood Reporter wrote that there are "laughs aplenty in this bright and giddy comedy in a small, sun-kissed town". Mark Schilling of The Japan Times rated it 3/5 stars and wrote, "For all its Ozu associations, the film has melodramatic moments that Ozu himself would have scripted out." Katie Walsh of IndieWire rated it B− and wrote, "Though not entirely successful, just the attempt itself is impressive."
