= Kanji Furutachi =

Japanese actor (born 1968)

- 古舘寛治
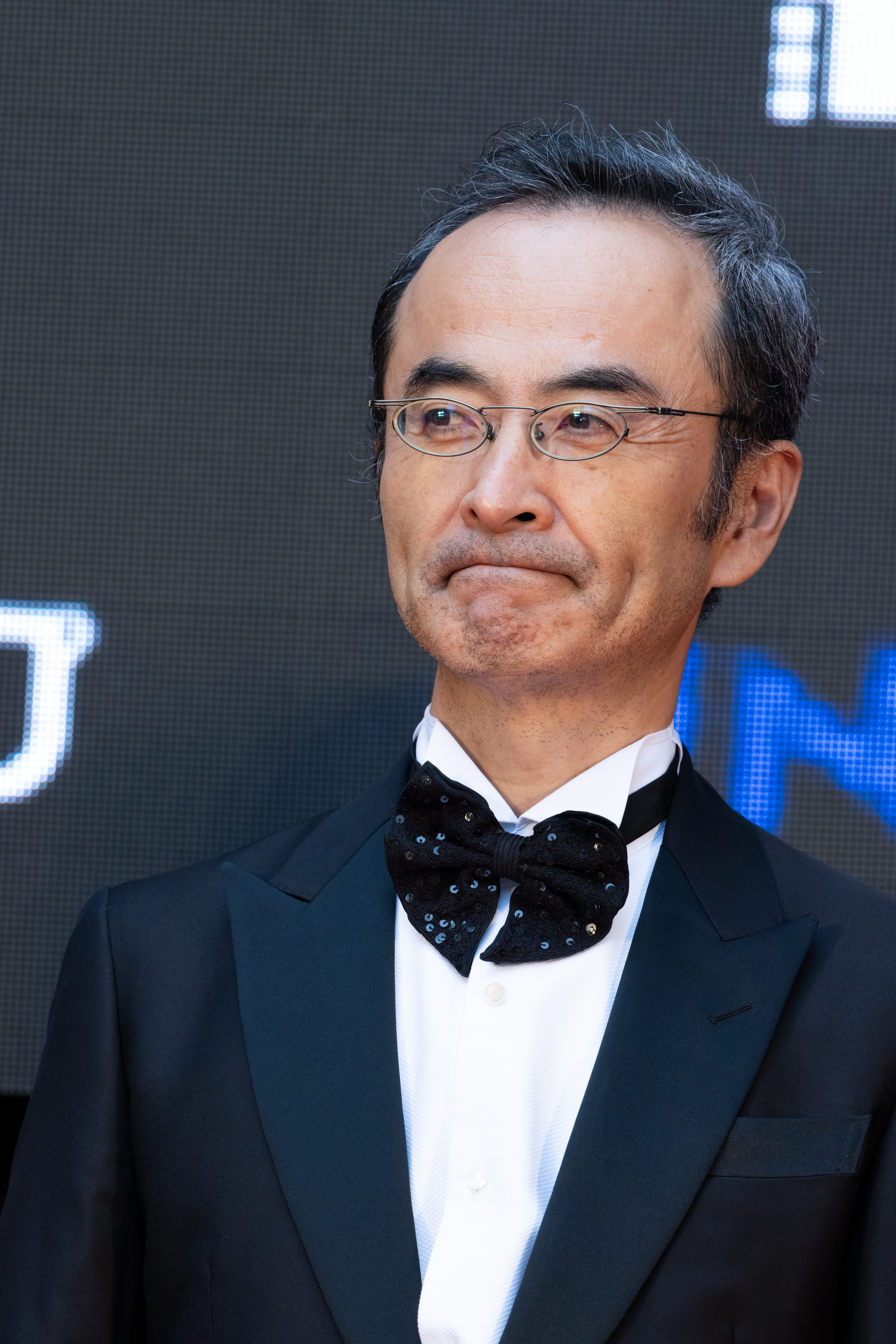
- Furutachi at the 37th Tokyo International Film Festival in 2024
- Born: March 23, 1968 (age 58); Sakai, Osaka, Japan
- Occupation: Actor

Kanji Furutachi (Japanese: 古舘 寛治, Hepburn: Furutachi Kanji; born March 23, 1968 in Osaka) is a Japanese actor.

== Career ==
Born in Sakai, Osaka, Furutachi traveled to New York in his twenties to study acting at the HB Studio under Uta Hagen. Returning to Japan, he joined the Seinendan theatre troupe run by Oriza Hirata and the Sample theatre troupe run by Shū Matsui. After appearing in many TV commercials, some of which earned him "nationwide popularity", he got significant roles in television dramas and films. He has frequently appeared in films directed by Seinendan member Kōji Fukada. For instance, Harmonium won the Jury Prize at the Un Certain Regard section of the 2016 Cannes Film Festival, with Furutachi gaining particular praise in reviews. It was announced in November 2017 he would be one of the main cast of the 2019 NHK Taiga drama Idaten. He had his first starring role in a TV drama with TV Tokyo's Kotaki Kyodai no Shikuhakku (2020), under the direction of Nobuhiro Yamashita.

== Selected filmography ==
=== Film ===
- The Wonderful World of Captain Kuhio (2009)
- Hospitalité (2010)
- The Woodsman and the Rain (2011)
- Hotori no Sakuko (2013)
- Maestro! (2015)
- Too Young to Die! (2016)
- Harmonium (2016)
- The Sun (2016)
- The 8-Year Engagement (2017)
- Miyamoto (2019)
- Silent Rain (2019)
- My Name is Yours (2020)
- The Voice of Sin (2020), Masao Torii
- One Summer Story (2021), Kiyoshi Sakuta
- Pretenders (2021)
- Annette (2021), Doctor
- Anime Supremacy! (2022)
- Hotsuretu (2023)
- The Voices at War (2024), Norizō Matsuuchi
- Ravens (2025), Sukezo Fukase
- The Escape (2025), Satoshi Kirishima
- Burn (2026), Juju's father
- A Side Character's Love Story (2026), Orihara
- It's All Bananas! (2026)
- The Day After Sunday (2026)
- Wandance (2026)
- Diamonds in the Sand (2027)

=== Television ===
- Legal High Season 2 (2013)
- Naotora: The Lady Warlord (2017), Matsushita Gentaro
- Idaten (2019), Isao Kani
- Kotaki Kyodai no Shikuhakku (2020)
- Maiagare! (2022–23), Hisayuki Kasamaki
- The Makanai: Cooking for the Maiko House (2023), Kanjirō Furutachi
- Beyond Goodbye (2024), conductor
- Blood and Sweat (2026), Kitajima

=== Japanese dub ===
- Blind Willow, Sleeping Woman (2024), Frog

=== Anime ===
- Lupin the Third: The Woman Called Fujiko Mine (2012)

=== Video games ===
- The World Ends with You (2007), Sanae Hanekoma
