= Hospitalité =

2010 film

- Film poster
- Directed by: Koji Fukada
- Written by: Koji Fukada
- Produced by: Koji Fukada; Kiki Sugino
- Starring: Kanji Furutachi
- Release date: 2010
- Running time: 96 minutes
- Country: Japan
- Language: Japanese

Hospitalité (Japanese: 歓待, Hepburn: Kantai) is a 2010 Japanese comedy film directed by Koji Fukada.

== Cast ==
- Kenji Yamauchi
- Kiki Sugino
- Kanji Furutachi
- Kumi Hyōdo
- Tatsuya Kawamura
- Bryerly Long
- Hiroko Matsuda
- Eriko Ono
- Haruka Saito
- Naoki Sugawara

== Reception ==
Ben Sachs of Chicago Reader called Hospitalité a "charming comedy", while Chris Cabin of Slant Magazine called it "Essentially timeless".

Maggie Lee of The Hollywood Reporter said that the film is "bizarre" and compared disguised Japanese xenophobia as a "house intruder" motif to that of Yoshimitsu Morita's Family Game and Max Frisch's play The Fire Raisers.

Ronnie Scheib of Variety was quoted saying that "[the film] maintains a marvelous tension between a prim comedy of manners and unbridled slapstick".
