= Koji Fukada =

Japanese film director and writer (born 1980)

- 深田 晃司
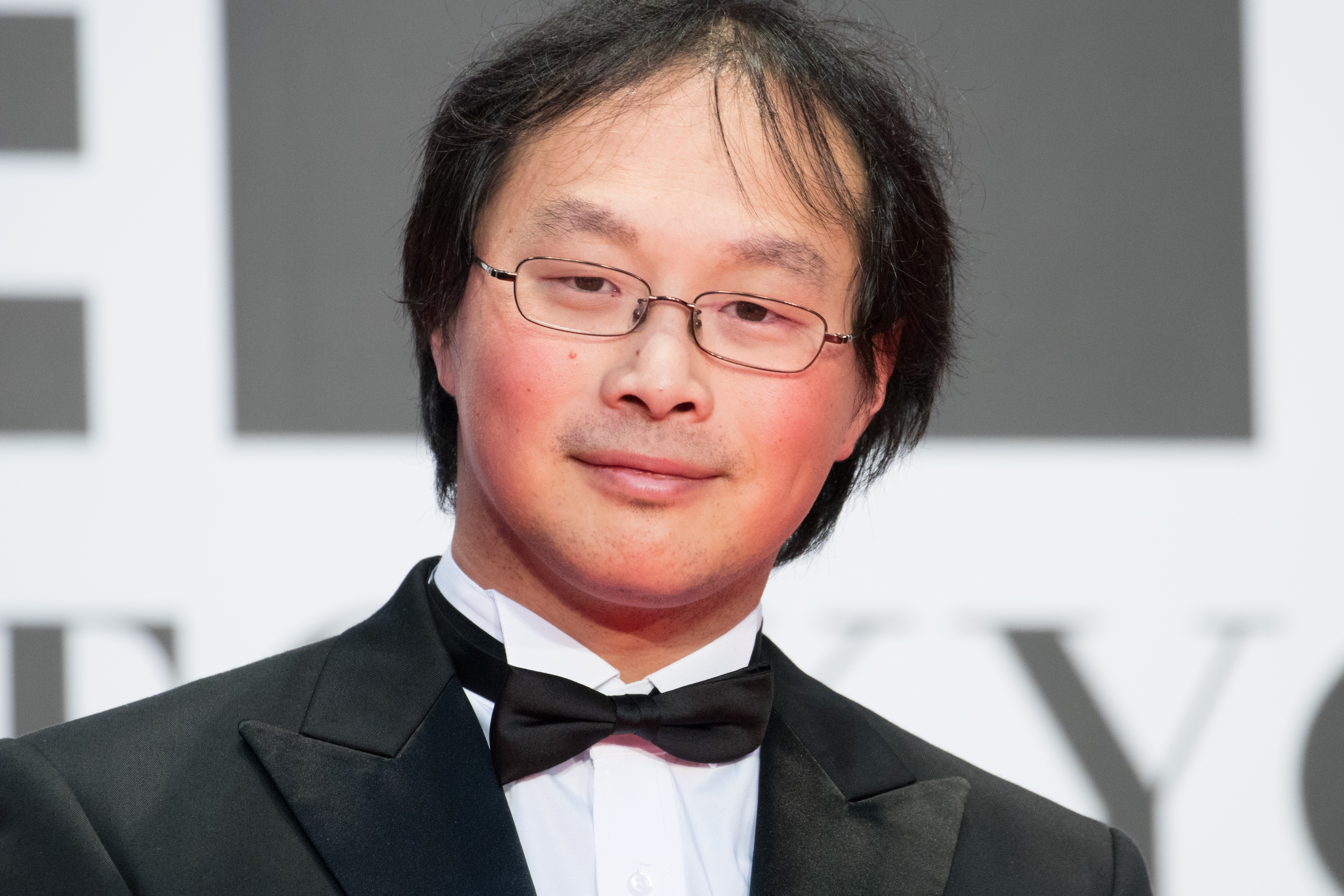
- Koji Fukada in 2016
- Born: 1980 (age 45–46); Koganei, Tokyo, Japan
- Occupations: Film director, screenwriter

Koji Fukada (深田 晃司, Fukada Kōji; born 1980 in Koganei, Tokyo) is a Japanese film director and screenwriter. Most known for his films Harmonium (2016), Love Life (2022) and Love on Trial (2025).

== Career ==
Born in Tokyo, Fukada had a father who was a film aficionado and he watched many films on VHS when he was young. It was when he was 19 years old studying at Taisho University and discovered the Film School of Tokyo that he began taking evening classes in filmmaking. One of his teachers was Kiyoshi Kurosawa. He made his first feature-length film, The Chair, in 2002. He joined the Seinendan theater troupe, headed by Oriza Hirata, in 2005, and has often used their work and their actors in his films.

== Influences ==
Fukada has said that he was strongly influenced by the films of Eric Rohmer, particularly The Green Ray, and was inspired to become a filmmaker after seeing Children of Paradise and The Spirit of the Beehive.

== Filmography ==
=== Feature films ===
Year	English title	Original title	Notes
2002	The Chair	椅子	
2008	Human Comedy in Tokyo	東京人間喜劇	
2010	Hospitalité	歓待	
2013	Au revoir l'été	ほとりの朔子	
2015	Sayonara	さようなら	
2016	Harmonium	淵に立つ	
2018	The Man from the Sea	海を駆ける	
2019	A Girl Missing	よこがお	
2020	The Real Thing	本気のしるし	compilation film of 2019 TV series
2022	Love Life		
2025	Love on Trial	恋愛裁判	
2026	Nagi Notes	ナギダイアリー	

== Awards ==
His film Hospitalité won the Best Picture Award in the Japanese Eyes competition of the Tokyo International Film Festival in 2010. Au revoir l'été won the grand prize and the prize of the young jury at the Three Continents Festival in 2013. And his 2016 film Harmonium won the Prix du Jury in the Un Certain Regard section of the Cannes Film Festival.
