= Frank Stephens =

Frank Stephens may refer to:

- Frank Stephens (advocate) (born 1982), American disability advocate, actor and athlete
- Frank Stephens (Australian footballer) (1927–1998), Australian rules footballer for North Melbourne and South Melbourne
- Frank Stephens (cricketer) (1889–1970), English cricketer
- Frank Stephens (naturalist) (1849-1937), American naturalist
- Frank Stephens (rugby) (1899–1971), Welsh rugby player
- Frank Stephens (sculptor) (1859–1935), American sculptor and co-founder of an utopian community
- Frank Stephens (surgeon) (1913–2011), Australian surgeon
- Frank B. Stephens, member of the Mississippi House of Representatives
- Frank Stephens (baseball), American Negro league pitcher

== See also ==
- Frank Stevens (disambiguation)
- Francis Stephens (disambiguation)
- Franklin Stevens (disambiguation)
