= Supremacy (film) =

2014 drama thriller film by Deon Taylor

- Theatrical release poster
- Directed by: Deon Taylor
- Written by: Eric J. Adams
- Produced by: Vince Cirrincione; Roxanne Avent
- Starring: Joe Anderson; Dawn Olivieri; Danny Glover; Derek Luke; Mahershala Ali; Julie Benz; Anson Mount
- Cinematography: Rodney Taylor (Note: Deon Taylor and Rodney Taylor are not related.)
- Edited by: Richard B. Molina
- Music by: Mike Einziger
- Production company: Hidden Empire Film Group
- Distributed by: Well Go USA Entertainment
- Release dates: June 12, 2014 (Los Angeles); January 30, 2015
- Running time: 110 minutes
- Country: United States
- Language: English
- Budget: $1 million
- Box office: $116,885 (rentals)

Supremacy is a 2014 American drama thriller film directed by Deon Taylor, written by Eric J. Adams, and starring Joe Anderson, Dawn Olivieri and Danny Glover. The film chronicles the real life events of March 29–30, 1995, perpetrated by Aryan Brotherhood members Robert Walter Scully Jr. and Brenda Kay Moore. After fatally shooting a police officer, neo-Nazi Garrett Tully, along with his companion, Doreen Lesser, breaks into a house and takes an African-American family hostage.

The film premiered at the Los Angeles Film Festival on June 12, 2014, and was released in the United States on January 30, 2015.

== Synopsis ==
Recently paroled after serving a fifteen-year prison sentence, Garrett Tully meets Doreen Lesser to complete a drug errand for their incarcerated Aryan Brotherhood boss, Paul Sobecki. After fatally shooting a cop, Tully breaks into a house, where he and Doreen take an African-American family hostage. An ex-con himself, the family patriarch, Sonny Walker, attempts to understand the neo-Nazi's motives and get his family out alive.

== Cast ==
- Joe Anderson as Garrett Tully
- Dawn Olivieri as Doreen Lesser
- Danny Glover as Sonny Walker
- Derek Luke as Raymond
- Lela Rochon as Odessa
- Evan Ross as Anthony
- Mahershala Ali as Deputy Rivers
- Julie Benz as Kristen
- Nick Chinlund as Hannity
- Robin Bobeau as Cassie
- Alex Henderson as Jamar
- Jenica Bergere as Gerardi
- Shaun Taylor-Corbett as Pedro
- Tyrin Turner as Reggie
- Anson Mount as Paul Sobecki
- Hemky Madera as Miguel

== Background ==
Deputy Sheriff Frank Trejo

Supremacy is based on the true story of Robert Walter Scully Jr. and Brenda Kay Moore. On March 29, 1995, between the cities of Santa Rosa and Sebastopol, California, Scully and Moore were parked in a pickup truck outside the Santa Rosa Saddlery. Believed to be pondering a nearby business to rob, they were confronted at approximately 11:30 PM by Sonoma County Deputy Sheriff Frank Vasquez Trejo. As he approached the truck, Trejo was shot and killed instantly with a sawed-off shotgun by Scully, who then took Trejo's weapon and fled with Moore to a nearby house on Lloyd Avenue, taking an African-American family of six hostage. After twelve hours, Scully and Moore surrendered to deputies.

Scully was a member of the Aryan Brotherhood, but insisted during his trial that the killing of Deputy Trejo was an accident and not racially motivated; Trejo was Latino. Scully was nevertheless found guilty of first degree murder and sentenced to death plus 274 years (for 11 "related" felony convictions) on June 14, 1997. He is currently on California's death row, awaiting execution (as of 2015). Moore was sentenced to 14 years, and was later sentenced to a further seven years for her "involvement in a prison gang whose members included Scully".

Trejo was a 35-year law enforcement veteran; he had been serving the Sonoma County Sheriff's Office for 15 years, and was 58 years old at the time of his death. He was survived by his wife, son and daughter. His funeral was attended by more than 2,400 people and he was posthumously awarded the Gold Medal of Valor for dying in the line of duty.

== Production ==
=== Development ===
After "floating around [for many years] as an independent filmmaker", Deon Taylor began looking for a "more serious project" to direct; one that would take him "out of the [horror] genre". In most cases, he couldn't find any that were "motivating". At the time, he had just finished directing Chain Letter, an independent horror film. It didn't "hit [Taylor]" the way he wanted, and Taylor claimed the only thing he learned from Chain Letter was "how to shoot [a film] quickly with no money".

While in Los Angeles, Taylor met with producer Vincent Cirrincione, who was "a fan of [his] work at the time". Cirrincione said he had "this script", but "didn't know" if it was right for Taylor because it was "one of those movies that could go either way". Taylor asked for the script and read it while flying back to Sacramento. He claimed to have called Cirrincione "immediately" after landing, and asked for a "few more days to wrap [his] head around the project". After reading the script a "few more times", Taylor "fell in love with [the] movie" and "called [Cirrincione] back". After "[making] a deal" with Cirrincione, Taylor had to find a producer willing to finance the film; he "ended up finding about a million dollars".

=== Background research ===
Taylor stated he "spoke with the family" that was taken hostage; having an "incredible conversation" with them about everything that "went down". He didn't "have enough time" to speak with Scully; who was on "death row" at the time, so he "couldn't get [an] entire story". Taylor said he "[solely] went with the family's perspective" because it was all "[he could] do".

=== Screenplay ===
The screenplay was written by Eric J. Adams.

=== Casting ===
Anderson, Glover, and Dawn Olivieri were the first to be cast; the announcement was made on February 9, 2012, by Indiewire.

On March 7, it was reported by Deadline that Anson Mount had signed on to portray Sobecki, the "nasty villain" and "head of the Aryan Brotherhood". Mount signed on for the role while taking a break from starring as Cullen Bohannon in Hell on Wheels, a western television series. The casting of Derek Luke, Lela Rochon, and Evan Ross was announced the same day.

=== Principal photography ===
Taylor couldn't achieve the "look [he] wanted" with an "HD camera", so he shot the movie on 16 mm film instead. Reportedly expensive, Taylor had to consult "all of the producers" beforehand, and although he didn't "have enough money" to use 16 mm film as much as he wanted, he did have enough to shoot "one or two takes" of each scene and "move on". Due to time constraints, principal photography lasted just 17 days.

The ethnic slur "nigger" is used heavily in the film; this caused "one day" of "really tough" filming for Taylor. The first day of principal photography involved a scene where "a black teenager, a young black baby, and Danny Glover" are all threatened with a gun; while being referred to as "niggers". Taylor said it was "very difficult to work" this way, and he had to sit down with each of the actors and explain to them what was going to happen beforehand. According to Taylor, it took "a few days" for everyone to "[get] into a rhythm".

== Release ==
The worldwide premiere took place at the Los Angeles Film Festival on June 12, 2014; Deputy Trejo's family members were in attendance. On June 26, 2014, Well Go USA Entertainment acquired the North American distribution rights. A "red carpet event" was held at the Esquire IMAX Theater on January 14, 2015, in Downtown Sacramento, California. This was followed by a limited theatrical release on January 30 in the United States.

=== Critical reception ===
The film received mostly negative reviews. On the review aggregator Rotten Tomatoes, the film has an approval rating of 33% based on 12 reviews, and an average rating of 3.9/10. On Metacritic, the film has a weighted average score of 28 out of 100, based on 6 critics, indicating "generally unfavorable reviews".

Drew Hunt, of Slant Magazine, awarded one out of four stars, he wrote: "Taylor completely fails to visually represent any sort of interpersonal human dynamic", and "[It] isn't long before we feel like hostages ourselves, bound by the filmmakers' strained moral outrage". Chris Klimek, of The Dissolve, awarded one and a half stars out of five, describing the film as an "unpleasant exercise that is well-acted".

Martin Tsai, of the Los Angeles Times, gave a positive review. He praised Eric J. Adams for upping "the ante by creating dissent among the hostages", and was equally complimentary of Taylor, who "impressively paces the film with unrelenting tension".

==== Accolades ====
On May 6, 2014, Film Independent announced Taylor as one of eleven film directors nominated for the LA Muse Award. He ultimately lost to Delila Vallot; she won for directing Can You Dig This, her first feature-length documentary. Nominees for the 11th edition of the AMA Awards were announced on June 20, 2015, in Los Angeles, California. Supremacy was one of three film's nominated for the Best Diaspora Feature, and on September 26, 2015, it won.

Year	Award / Film Festival	Category	Recipient(s)	Result
June 18, 2015	Los Angeles Film Festival	LA Muse Award	Deon Taylor	Nominated
September 28, 2015	Africa Movie Academy Awards	Best Diaspora Feature	Supremacy	Won

=== Box office ===
There is no information on the film's box office performance or gross.

=== Home media ===
The film was given an R rating by the Motion Picture Association of America.

== See also ==
- List of films featuring home invasions
