= Roxanne Avent =

American film producer

- Born: June 21, 1976 (age 49); Portland, Oregon
- Occupations: Film producer Movie Studio Executive
- Years active: 2007 - Present
- Spouse: Deon Taylor (married 2014-present)
- Relatives: sister: Selena Williams, Sacramento age 42

Roxanne Avent (born 21 June 1976) is an American film producer and movie studio executive.

== Career ==
Avent has produced several films, including Meet the Blacks, starring Mike Epps, George Lopez, Mike Tyson, Snoop Dogg, Bresha Webb and Zulay Henad. She is the co-founder of Hidden Empire Film Group (HEFG) alongside her partner Deon Taylor. The company supplies commercial projects for studios and major independents worldwide. She is the producer of the award-winning film Supremacy starring Danny Glover, Derek Luke, Evan Ross and Lela Rochon. She is also the producer of Chain Letter, The Hustle and Dead Tone.

Before running HEFG, Avent worked for the Directors Guild of America. She also served as a label manager for Taylor Made Muzik, the largest independent record label in North California.

== Filmography ==
Year	Film	Role	Notes
2007	Dead Tone	Co-executive producer	
2008	The Hustle	Co-executive producer, Production manager	
2008	Nite Tales: The Movie	Co-executive producer, Production manager	
2009	Up All Nite	Producer	TV series 6 episodes
2009	Chain Letter	Executive producer, Production manager	
2009–2011	Nite Tales: The Series	Unit production manager	TV series 3 episodes
2011	Night Tales	Producer	TV movie
2014	Supremacy	Producer, Unit production manager	
2016	Meet the Blacks	Producer, Unit production manager	
2018	Traffik	Producer	
2019	The Intruder	Producer	
2019	Black and Blue	Producer	
2020	Fatale	Producer	
2021	The House Next Door: Meet the Blacks 2	Producer	
