= Franklin Stevens =

Franklin Stevens may refer to:

- Benjamin Franklin Stevens, bibliographer
- Franklin-Stevens PS-2
- Frank Stephens (advocate) (born 1981 or 1982, full name John Franklin Stephens), American disability advocate, actor and athlete

== See also ==
- Frank Stevens (disambiguation)
- Frank Stephens (disambiguation)
