= Frank Stevens =

Frank Stevens may refer to:

- Frank Stevens, archaeologist and former Curator of the Salisbury Museum
- Frank Stevens (baseball), American baseball player
- Frank Douglas Stevens, flying ace
- Frank Stevens, character in Revenge (TV series)

== See also ==
- Frankie Stevens, New Zealand entertainer and singer
- Franklin Stevens (disambiguation)
- Frank Stephens (disambiguation)
- Francis Stevens (disambiguation)
