= Nite Tales: The Movie =

- Directed by: Deon Taylor
- Written by: Diana Erwin; Deon Taylor
- Produced by: Steve Cubine; Tony 'Timber' Moore; Peter Wise
- Starring: Flavor Flav; Dante Basco; Jordan Woolley; Sandra McCoy; Andrea Bogart; Chico Benymon; Sticky Fingaz; Tony Todd; Michael J. Pagan; Fredro Starr; Tyrin Turner
- Cinematography: Keith Smith and Keith L. Smith
- Edited by: Lane Baker
- Music by: Aramando Jimenez
- Production company: Deon Taylor Enterprises
- Distributed by: New Films Cinema
- Release date: January 1, 2008
- Running time: 93 minutes
- Country: United States
- Language: English

Nite Tales: The Movie is a 2008 horror anthology film that includes two movies: Karma and Storm. It was written by Diana Erwin and Deon Taylor. The film is hosted by rapper Flavor Flav who is seen wearing his trademark large oversized necklace clock.

== Plot ==
'Karma' follows a gang of bank robbers who get more than they bargained for when their car breaks down near a remote farmhouse, while 'Storm' follows a group of students whose night of partying takes a dark turn as they play a game of Bloody Mary.

== Cast ==
=== Karma ===
- Kirk "Sticky Fingaz" Jones as Dice
- Michael J. Pagan as Muse
- Fredro Starr as Twan
- Tyrin Turner as Dee
- Soraya Kelley as Sarah
- Terrence Evans
- Richard Moorhouse as Bank manager
- James Otis

=== Storm ===
- Dante Basco as Gerard
- Jordan Woolley as Tom
- Sandra McCoy as Serena
- Andrea Bogart as Cindy
- Chico Benymon as Mitch
- James Ferris as Cop / The Police Officer
- Tony Todd as Clown / James
- Ariele Senara as Bloody Mary

== Nite Tales: The Series ==
Nite Tales: The Series was created after Nite Tales: The Movie due to the success of its airing. Episodes were shot in one day on a 35 millimeter camera and budgeted around $20,000 – $50,000. The series was later aired on WGN in Chicago, Illinois on Friday nights at midnight in 2009. Nite Tales: The Movie was released on DVD in 2008 with a DVD release of the series pending in the future.

=== Cast ===
- Flavor Flav as Himself – Host / Time Keeper
- Ray Crockett as Host (episode "Ima Star")

=== Episodes ===
==== Season 1 (2009) ====
No. overall	No. in season	Title	Directed by	Written by	Original release date	Prod. code	US viewers (millions)
1	1	"Night Watch"	Deon Taylor	Diana Erwin	August 14, 2009	101	N/A
Omar, working at a store as a night watchman, spends most of his time playing with mannequins until something strange happens. Guest stars: DeRay Davis, Rodney Perry, Khatira Razada, and Tim Yee
1	2	"Dark Heart"	Deon Taylor	Diana Erwin	August 21, 2009	102	N/A
As Jennifer is still trying to cope with the loss of her father, she is fired so two of her friends take her to a psychic. Guest stars: Michael Acosta, Essence Atkins, Molly Goode, Robert Granados, Ed Gyles Jr, Brian Hilton, Lauren DeLong, Camilla Romestrand, and Dominique Whitney Thomas
1	3	"Trapped"	Deon Taylor	Diana Erwin	August 28, 2009	103	N/A
Seven people wake up in a room with no windows and no one knows each other. Guest stars: Gary Busey, Greg Cipes, Susane Lee, Tommy 'Tiny' Lister, April Scott, and J. D. Williams
1	4	"Ima Star"	Deon Taylor	Diana Erwin	September 4, 2009	104	N/A
A young rapper tries to get his career going, but seems to have trouble all the time. Guest stars: Roxanne Avent, Andy Butler, Rob Evors, Shaun Grady, Ken Hilmer, Christopher Michael Holley, Ray J, Ras Kass, Paul T. McGee, Kel Mitchell, Siobhan Presley, Johan Tate, Michael X. Sommers, David Stickler, Valeria Taylor, John Thomas, Joe Torry, and Jay Alan Wierenga
1	5	"Black Widow"	Deon Taylor	Diana Erwin and Deon Taylor	September 11, 2009	105	N/A
Problems seem to rise all the time for Lisa who finds a date. Guest stars: Avear Carey, Matt Cohen, Christina Dimakides, Camilla Dixon, Bryan T. Donovan, Stephanie Hyden, Brigitte Nielsen, Carl Anthony Payne II, and Camilla Romestrand
1	6	"Pill Time"	Deon Taylor	Diana Erwin	September 18, 2009	106	N/A
Guest stars: Danny Glover and Charles Q. Murphy

==== Season 2 (2011) ====
No. overall	No. in season	Title	Directed by	Written by	Original release date	Prod. code	US viewers (millions)
2	1	"Last Laugh"	Jamie Foxx and Deon Taylor	Oliver W. Ottley III and Deon Taylor	January 16, 2011	201	TBA
Sam Laughlin has no luck whatsoever as a comedian and then winds up killing all the audience members. Gueast stars: Tom Arnold, Jennifer Barbosa, Susan Johnston, Jason Mewes, Betsy Moore, Rene Moran, Alyshia Ochse, Nicole Sadighi, Ciarra Siller, and Jonathan Walker Spencer
