= Fear (2023 film) =

Film by Deon Taylor

- Theatrical release poster
- Directed by: Deon Taylor
- Written by: Deon Taylor; John Ferry
- Produced by: Roxanne Avent; Omar Joseph; Heather Kritzer; Deon Taylor; Terrence J
- Starring: Joseph Sikora; Andrew Bachelor; Annie Ilonzeh; Ruby Modine; Iddo Goldberg; Terrence Jenkins; Jessica Allain; Tip "T.I." Harris
- Cinematography: Christopher Duskin
- Edited by: Peck Prior
- Music by: Geoff Zanelli
- Production company: Hidden Empire Film Group
- Distributed by: Hidden Empire Releasing
- Release date: January 27, 2023
- Running time: 98 minutes
- Country: United States
- Language: English
- Box office: $2.1 million

Fear is a 2023 American horror thriller directed by Deon Taylor, co-written by Taylor and John Ferry, and starring Joseph Sikora, Andrew Bachelor, Annie Ilonzeh, Ruby Modine, Iddo Goldberg, Terrence Jenkins, Jessica Allain and Tip "T.I." Harris.

The film was released in the United States on January 27, 2023. It received generally negative reviews and grossed $2.1 million.

== Plot ==
The film follows a group of friends who retreat to a remote and historic hotel for a relaxing weekend getaway. The trip is led by Rom, a bestselling author and motivational speaker, who brings his fiancée Bianca and their close friends Lou, Michael, Michael's girlfriend Kim, Benny, Serena, and Meg to celebrate Bianca's birthday.

As they settle into the hotel, Rom introduces a discussion about fear, stating that everyone has a personal fear that controls them. He suggests that facing fears head-on is the key to overcoming them. To test this theory, each friend shares their deepest fear. However, strange and terrifying events soon unfold, making their worst nightmares come to life.

One by one, each friend starts experiencing hallucinations and supernatural attacks related to their personal fears. Bianca, who has a fear of drowning, starts seeing disturbing water-related visions. Lou, a skeptic, is confronted by an entity that makes him question reality. Michael and Kim, who have their own anxieties, are tormented by eerie manifestations.

As paranoia and terror grow, the group realizes that the hotel itself is haunted by a malevolent force that feeds on fear. Their bond begins to fracture as trust dissolves, and they turn against each other, unsure of what’s real or imagined.

The night escalates into chaos as each member faces their ultimate nightmare, and many of them succumb to the entity’s psychological torment. Rom, being a motivational speaker, tries to maintain control, but even he is pushed to his limits.

The climax reveals that the entity manipulating their fears is inescapable, and the hotel was a trap from the start. In a twisted finale, Rom discovers that the entire experience was orchestrated to break them mentally and spiritually, leaving few survivors—if any at all.

The film ends on a bleak note, reinforcing the idea that fear, once it takes hold, can be inescapable and deadly.

== Cast ==
- Joseph Sikora as Rom
- Andrew Bachelor as Benny
- Annie Ilonzeh as Bianca
- Ruby Modine as Serena
- Iddo Goldberg as Michael
- Terrence Jenkins as Russ
- Jessica Allain as Meg
- Tip "T.I." Harris as Lou

== Production ==
Fear, originally titled Don't Fear, was shot in 17 days in Kyburz, California, during the COVID-19 pandemic in August 2020.

The film's score was composed by Geoff Zanelli, who scored several of Taylor's previous films.

== Release ==
Fear was set to be released on Valentine's Day weekend in 2022, as the first release of Hidden Empire Film Group's new distribution company, Hidden Empire Releasing. The film was released in the United States on January 27, 2023. It released via video on demand on April 25, 2023.

== Reception ==
On the review aggregator website Rotten Tomatoes, 21% of 19 critics' reviews are positive, with an average rating of 3.9/10.

Matthew Monagle of The Austin Chronicle wrote, "It is frustrating to watch Fear carelessly oscillate between creature feature, haunted house movie, and folk horror... In the end, the scariest thing about Fear is its stock video opening montage – not a compliment any director wants to hear." Katie Walsh of the Tribune News Service praised the cinematography, score and sound design, but criticized the script as "prov[ing] that it is possible to have too many ideas for just one film." She added, "Deadliest of all, Fear is just not scary. The jump scares don't land, the fears themselves are all a bit silly and it feels like Taylor is holding back for the majority of the run time." Common Sense Media's Jeffrey M. Anderson gave the film 2/5 stars, writing, "Despite a diverse cast and a nifty location, this soggy, inert horror movie unfolds with a most unimaginative collection of worn-out genre staples, starting with its bland title."

Richard Roeper of the Chicago Sun-Times gave the film 3/4 stars, writing, "There's nothing subtle or deeply original about Fear, though it does feature some impressive albeit low-budget special effects, first-rate production design and strong performances from the cast; it knows we've seen a dozen other movies about a group of friends who meet up in the country for what they hope will be an idyllic weekend, only to see things quickly go from mildly disturbing to truly weird to deeply concerning to horrifying bloody."
