= Geoff Zanelli =

American composer (born 1974)

- Born: Geoffrey Zanelli; September 28, 1974 (age 52); Westminster, California, U.S.
- Genres: Film and television score, video game score, pop, rock, electronic, experimental, jazz
- Occupations: Composer, orchestrator
- Instruments: Piano, keyboards, synthesizer, guitar, bass
- Years active: 1997–present
- Website: www.geoffzanelli.com

Geoffrey Zanelli (born September 28, 1974) is an American composer working primarily in the medium of film, television, and video game scores. His early career was notable for scoring additional music on roughly 30 film scores written by Hans Zimmer, Klaus Badelt, John Powell, Harry Gregson-Williams, Ramin Djawadi, Danny Elfman, and Steve Jablonsky including several blockbuster films. He has since moved on to more solo work, winning a Primetime Emmy Award for Outstanding Music Composition for a Limited Series, Movie, or Special for his score to the miniseries Into the West.

Aside from film and television scores, Zanelli also works with recording artists, writing arrangements for Steve Martin, Edie Brickell, Robbie Williams, The Webb Sisters, Mest and Story of the Year. He is credited as a guitarist, bassist, and keyboardist on the song "I'm Not Dead" from recording artist Pink.

== Early life and education ==
Zanelli was born on September 28, 1974, in Westminster, California. He graduated in 1996 from Berklee College of Music.

== Career ==
In 1994, at 19 years old, Zanelli met Hans Zimmer, believing him to be a promising young talent, Zimmer invited him to Los Angeles to join his group of film composers. Zanelli worked as an engineer on the debut album from Goldfinger as well as Zimmer's score for The Preacher's Wife.

Zanelli's experience and desire to collaborate led him to work with British composer John Powell on his first Hollywood feature, Face/Off. Throughout the following years he built the foundation for his scoring career, composing with Powell, Hans Zimmer, Harry Gregson-Williams, and Steve Jablonsky on many feature films, including: Pirates of the Caribbean: The Curse of the Black Pearl, Pirates of the Caribbean: On Stranger Tides, Rango and the Golden Globe-nominated scores for The Last Samurai and Pearl Harbor.

One of his earliest solo works, Steven Spielberg's miniseries Into the West, earned him an Emmy. In approximately one year, Zanelli scored the films Disturbia, Hitman, Outlander, Delgo, Ghost Town and Gamer.

In early 2013, film blog Ain't It Cool News called his score for The Odd Life of Timothy Green the best score of 2012. In 2017, he composed the score to Pirates of the Caribbean: Dead Men Tell No Tales, picking up the mantle from long-time series composer Hans Zimmer. In June 2018, he composed the score for Disney's Christopher Robin with Jon Brion.

== Filmography ==
=== Film ===
==== As primary score composer ====
Year	Title	Director	Studio / Publisher	Notes
2004	House of D	David Duchovny	Bob Yari Productions; Lionsgate Films	
2004	Secret Window	David Koepp	Columbia Pictures; Sony Pictures Releasing	Composed with Philip Glass
2007	Hitman	Xavier Gens	Dune Entertainment; EuropaCorp; 20th Century Fox	
2007	Disturbia	D. J. Caruso	DreamWorks Pictures; The Montecito Picture Company; Paramount Pictures	
2008	Delgo	Marc F. Adler; Jason Maurer	Fathom Studios; Freestyle Releasing	First score for an animated film
2008	Outlander	Howard McCain	The Weinstein Company; Virtual Studios	
2008	Ghost Town	David Koepp	Spyglass Entertainment; DreamWorks Pictures; Paramount Pictures	
2009	Gamer	Mark Neveldine; Brian Taylor	Lakeshore Entertainment; Lionsgate Films	Composed with Robert Williamson
2011	You May Not Kiss the Bride	Rob Hedden	Showcase Entertainment; Freestyle Releasing	
2011	Beneath the Darkness	Martin Guigui	Sunset Pictures; Image Entertainment	
2012	The Odd Life of Timothy Green	Peter Hedges	Scott Sanders Productions; Walt Disney Pictures	
2013	Once Upon a Time in Queens	David Rodriguez	Grindstone Entertainment; Lionsgate Films	
2013	Louder Than Words	Anthony Fabian	Identity Films; ARC Entertainment	
2014	School Dance	Nick Cannon	N'Credible Entertainment; Lionsgate Films	
2015	The Scorpion King 4: Quest for Power	Mike Elliott	Universal 1440 Entertainment; Universal Pictures	
2015	Mortdecai	David Koepp	Odd Lot Entertainment; Infinitum Nihil; Lionsgate Films	Composed with Mark Ronson
2015	No Stranger Than Love	Nick Wernham	Innis Lake Entertainment; Orion Pictures; Momentum Pictures	
2016	Bling	Kyung Ho Lee; Wonjae Lee	Digiart Productions; Digital Idea; Momentum Pictures	
2016	Masterminds	Jared Hess	Michaels-Goldwyn; Relativity Media	
2017	The Ottoman Lieutenant	Joseph Ruben	Eastern Sunrise Films; Paladin	
2017	Pirates of the Caribbean: Dead Men Tell No Tales	Joachim Rønning; Espen Sandberg	Jerry Bruckheimer Films; Walt Disney Pictures	Themes by Klaus Badelt and Hans Zimmer
2018	Traffik	Deon Taylor	Codeblack Films; Summit Entertainment	
2018	Christopher Robin	Marc Forster	2DUX²; Walt Disney Pictures	Replaced Jóhann Jóhannsson; composed with Jon Brion
2019	The Intruder	Deon Taylor	Screen Gems; Primary Wave Entertainment; Sony Pictures Releasing	
2019	Red Shoes and the Seven Dwarfs	Sung-ho Hong; Moo-Hyun Jang; Young Sik Uhm	Locus Creative Studios; Next Entertainment World	
2019	Black and Blue	Deon Taylor	Hidden Empire Film Group; Screen Gems	
2019	Maleficent: Mistress of Evil	Joachim Rønning	Roth Films; Walt Disney Pictures	Replaced James Newton Howard
2020	You Should Have Left	David Koepp	Blumhouse Productions; Universal Pictures	
2020	Fatale	Deon Taylor	Hidden Empire Film Group; Summit Entertainment	
2021	The House Next Door: Meet the Blacks 2	Deon Taylor	Hidden Empire Film Group	
2023	Fear	Deon Taylor	Hidden Empire Film Group	
2023	The Hill	Jeff Celentano	Rainmaker Films; Briarcliff Entertainment	
2023	Freelance	Pierre Morel	AGC Studios; Endurance Media; Relativity Media	Themes only; score by Elliot Leung
2023	Leo	Robert Marianetti; Robert Smigel; David Wachtenheim	Happy Madison Productions; Netflix	Original songs by Robert Smigel
2024	10 Lives	Chris Jenkins	GFM Animation; Align; Caramel Films; L'Atelier Animation	Composed with Tom Howe
2024	Man and Witch: The Dance of a Thousand Steps	Michael Hines	Paper Canoe Studio; Fathom Events	
2025	Bad Haircut	Kyle Misak	Throwback Pictures; Innovative Media Group	
2025	Good Luck, Have Fun, Don't Die	Gore Verbinski	Briarcliff Entertainment; 3 Arts Entertainment; Blind Wink Productions; Constantin Film; Robert Kulzer Productions; WAM Films	

==== As composer of additional music ====
Year	Title	Director	Composer	Notes
1997	Face/Off	John Woo	John Powell	
1998	Antz	Eric Darnell; Tim Johnson	John Powell; Harry Gregson-Williams	Also orchestrator
1999	Endurance	Leslie Woodhead; Bud Greenspan	John Powell	
1999	Chill Factor	Hugh Johnson	Hans Zimmer; John Powell	
2000	The Road to El Dorado	Don Paul; Bibo Bergeron; Jeffrey Katzenberg	Hans Zimmer; John Powell	Also technical advisor
2000	Chicken Run	Peter Lord; Nick Park	John Powell; Harry Gregson-Williams	
2000	Hannibal	Ridley Scott	Hans Zimmer	
2001	Just Visiting	Jean-Marie Poiré	John Powell	
2001	Pearl Harbor	Michael Bay	Hans Zimmer	
2002	Eye See You	James Gillespie	John Powell	
2002	The Time Machine	Simon Wells	Klaus Badelt	
2002	Passionada	Dan Ireland	Harry Gregson-Williams	
2002	K-19: The Widowmaker	Kathryn Bigelow	Klaus Badelt	
2002	Equilibrium	Kurt Wimmer	Klaus Badelt	
2003	Ned Kelly	Gregor Jordan	Klaus Badelt; Bernard Fanning	
2003	Pirates of the Caribbean: The Curse of the Black Pearl	Gore Verbinski	Klaus Badelt	
2003	Veronica Guerin	Joel Schumacher	Harry Gregson-Williams	Uncredited
2003	Matchstick Men	Ridley Scott	Hans Zimmer	
2003	The Last Samurai	Edward Zwick	Hans Zimmer	
2004	Catwoman	Pitof	Klaus Badelt	
2004	Shark Tale	Vicky Jenson; Bibo Bergeson; Rob Letterman	Hans Zimmer	
2006	Pirates of the Caribbean: Dead Man's Chest	Gore Verbinski	Hans Zimmer	
2007	Pirates of the Caribbean: At World's End	Gore Verbinski	Hans Zimmer	
2008	Madagascar: Escape 2 Africa	Eric Darnell; Tom McGrath	Will.i.am; Hans Zimmer	
2009	Angels & Demons	Ron Howard	Hans Zimmer	
2010	Clash of the Titans	Louis Leterrier	Ramin Djawadi	
2011	Rango	Gore Verbinski	Hans Zimmer	
2011	Pirates of the Caribbean: On Stranger Tides	Rob Marshall	Hans Zimmer	
2013	The Lone Ranger	Gore Verbinski	Hans Zimmer	
2017	Justice League	Zack Snyder	Danny Elfman	

=== Television ===
Year	Title	Network(s)	Notes
2000	Die Motorrad-Cops	RTL	Episode: "Am Abgrund"
2000	Fear	MTV	3 episodes
2000-03	SportsCentury	ESPN	8 episodes
2002	National Geographic Explorer	National Geographic	Episode: "Lost Subs: Disaster at Sea"; Composer of additional music Composed by Steve Jablonsky
2002	Live from Baghdad	HBO	Television film Composer of additional music Composed by Steve Jablonsky
2003	Threat Matrix	ABC	Episode: "Pilot"; Composer of additional music Composed by Steve Jablonsky
2005	Into the West	TNT	Miniseries; 6 episodes Primetime Emmy Award for Outstanding Music Composition for a Miniseries, Movie or a Special (Original Dramatic Score)
2010	The Pacific	HBO	Miniseries; 10 episodes Composed with Blake Neely; Theme music by Hans Zimmer; Nominated – Primetime Emmy Award for Outstanding Music Composition for a Miniseries, Movie or a Special (Original Dramatic Score)
2013	Killing Kennedy	National Geographic	Television film
2013	Christmas in Conway	ABC	Television film
2022	The First Lady	Showtime	

=== Video games ===
Year	Title	Publisher	Notes
2004	Champions of Norrath	Sony Online Entertainment	Composer of additional music Composed by Inon Zur
2007	Shrek the Third	Activision	Composer of additional music Composed by Winifred Phillips
2009	Call of Duty: Modern Warfare: Mobilized	Activision	
2010	Call of Duty: Black Ops	Activision	Nintendo DS version
2011	Call of Duty: Modern Warfare 3 – Defiance	Activision	
TBA	Star Citizen: Squadron_42	Cloud Imperium Games	

== Awards and nominations ==
Year	Award	Category	Work	Result
2006	Primetime Emmy Awards	Outstanding Music Composition for a Miniseries, Movie or a Special (Original Dramatic Score)	Into the West	Won
2006	International Film Music Critics Awards	Best Original Score for a Television Series	Into the West	Nominated
2008	ASCAP Film and Television Music Awards	Top Box Office Films	Disturbia	Nominated
2010	Primetime Emmy Awards	Outstanding Music Composition for a Miniseries, Movie or a Special (Original Dramatic Score)	The Pacific: Part 10 (shared with Blake Neely and Hans Zimmer)	Nominated
2019	International Film Music Critics Awards	Best Original Score for a Comedy Film	Christopher Robin	Nominated
2019	Hollywood Music in Media Awards	Best Original Score in a Sci-Fi/Fantasy/Horror Film	Maleficent: Mistress of Evil	Nominated
