= Meet the Blacks =

2016 black comedy horror film by Deon Taylor

- Theatrical release poster
- Directed by: Deon Taylor
- Written by: Deon Taylor; Nicole DeMasi
- Produced by: Roxanne Avent; Shannon McIntosh; Deon Taylor
- Starring: Mike Epps; Gary Owen; Zulay Henao; Bresha Webb; Lil Duval; George Lopez; Mike Tyson
- Cinematography: John T. Connor
- Edited by: Suzanne Hines; Patrick McMahon
- Music by: RZA
- Production company: Hidden Empire Film Group
- Distributed by: Freestyle Releasing
- Release date: April 1, 2016
- Running time: 93 minutes
- Country: United States
- Language: English
- Budget: $900,000
- Box office: $9.1 million

Meet the Blacks is a 2016 American black comedy horror film directed by Deon Taylor, written by Taylor and Nicole DeMasi, and is a parody of the 2013 film The Purge. It stars Mike Epps, Gary Owen, Zulay Henao, Lil Duval, Bresha Webb, George Lopez and Mike Tyson. This was Charlie Murphy's last film role before his death from leukemia in 2017 as well as the final role for Paul Mooney, who died in 2021.

The film was released on April 1, 2016, by Freestyle Releasing. Although the film received generally negative reviews from critics, it was a box-office success, grossing over $9 million on its $900,000 budget. A sequel, titled The House Next Door: Meet the Blacks 2, was released on June 11, 2021.

== Premise ==
Carl Black and his family are getting out of Chicago. After having stolen a lot of money from a famed criminal drug king, Key Flo, and believing that he will be imprisoned for the next five to six years, Carl Black leaves the hustling lifestyle behind for something better. Carl, his new wife Lorena, son Carl Jr., daughter Allie Black and cousin Cronut pack up and move to Beverly Hills. Turns out, Carl could not have picked a worse time to move. They arrive right around the time of the annual purge and all Carl's personal issues intertwine while all crime is legal for twelve hours.

== Cast ==
- Mike Epps as Carl Black
- Gary Owen as Larry
- Zulay Henao as Lorena Black
- Bresha Webb as Allie Black
- Lil Duval as Cronut
- Paul Mooney as Klan Member
- Charlie Murphy as Key Flo
- Phil Austin as Jim Smith
- King Bach as Freezee
- Lavell Crawford as Parole Officer
- DeRay Davis as Tyrone
- Kate Enggren as Mary Smith
- Alex Henderson as Carl Black Jr.
- George Lopez as President El Bama
- Mike Tyson as James Clown
- Shawn Kavanaugh as Marcus
- Perez Hilton as Denis Strahan
- Michael Blackson as Mr. Wooky
- Tameka Cottle as Shoranda
- Kathrien Ahn as Ming
- Snoop Dogg as Todd
- Tyrin Turner as Big Head Rico

== Reception ==
=== Box office ===
In its opening weekend, early tracking suggested the film would gross $4–5 million from 1,115 theaters in its opening weekend, and was released alongside God's Not Dead 2. In its opening weekend the film grossed $4.1 million, finishing 8th at the box office.

=== Streaming ===
In January 2021, it ranked fifth on a list of the most streamed films on Hulu.

=== Critical response ===
On review aggregation website Rotten Tomatoes, the film has an approval rating of 17%, based on 12 reviews, with an average rating of 3.30/10. On Metacritic, the film has a score of 26 out of 100, based on 4 critics, indicating "generally unfavorable reviews". The Herald & Review named Meet the Blacks the fifth worst film released in 2016.

The Guardian gave the three out of five stars writing, "While there is a whiff of social commentary in this low-budget spoof of the 2013 horror The Purge, only a comic performance from Bresha Webb provides any impact", saying that her performance was "so unpredictable and versatile it virtually makes up for the film’s many dull patches."

The Truckee Sun gave the film an F, writing, "Given the family's chaotic and disagreeable state, we have every reason to hope they are purged along with this movie that ought to have been killed months before it reached any cinema." The Citizen Times wrote, "In the hands of gifted performers, this open approach has the power to inspire in-the-moment hilarity often greater than the best lines and gags cooked up by the film’s creators, but no individuals who fit that description are present here." The Arkansas Times wrote, "Movies don't come much worse than Meet the Blacks, and when they do, they tend to go straight to video. At this quality level they tend to slink beneath the classification of movie per se, because technically they're just some dude screwing around with a camera and his buddies so he can get better at Final Cut. There are many markers of the overall badness of Meet the Blacks, but none perhaps more damning than George Lopez playing a character named President El Bama, maybe the funniest thing in this film's 90-minute run time."

Substream Magazine described the film as "criminally bad [...] an alleged horror-comedy that fails spectacularly at being either one of those things. Carried by a funny, yet uninspired Mike Epps, the films [sic] tries to reinvent the parody genre with a lazy and uninspired take on The Purge franchise that is dead on arrival." The Hollywood Reporter called the film "a wrongheaded, utterly incompetent and nearly laugh-free satire".

Common Sense Media called it "nearly unwatchable [...] crass and forgettable". Christy Lemire, writing for RogerEbert.com, gave one out of four stars, saying "every once in a while it seems to be trying, slightly, to make a vague point about racial prejudices and tensions. Mostly, though, Meet the Blacks is too scatterbrained to be so self-aware." The A.V. Club said the film "may not actually qualify as one after all. It’s more like an extremely confusing and sloppily written chunk of Purge fan-fiction—a tortured use of another movie’s absurd mythology to help make muddled quasi-satirical points, while indulging the apparently fail-safe punchline of saying the word “purge” about once a minute."

== Sequel ==
In October 2017, a sequel was confirmed to be released in February 2020, called The House Next Door: Meet the Blacks 2, with Mike Epps reprising his role. The sequel was released on June 11, 2021.

== See also ==
- List of black films of the 2010s
