= The Last Producer =

2000 film by Burt Reynolds

- Film poster
- Directed by: Burt Reynolds
- Written by: Clyde Hayes
- Produced by: Daniel Bigel; Michael Mailer; Vincent Cirrincione
- Starring: Burt Reynolds; Rod Steiger; Benjamin Bratt; Ann-Margret
- Cinematography: Nick McLean
- Edited by: Jennifer Jean Cacavas; Tod Feuerman
- Music by: Peter Manning Robinson
- Release date: February 9, 2001
- Running time: 90 minutes
- Country: United States
- Language: English

The Last Producer is a 2000 American drama film directed by and starring Burt Reynolds. It also featured Sean Astin, Ann-Margret, Lauren Holly, Rod Steiger, and Benjamin Bratt. It was also referred to as The Final Hit in final packaging and promotional materials. It is the final film to be directed by Reynolds before his death in 2018.

== Plot ==
Sonny Wexler is an aging veteran film producer with an addict wife. In his peak, Sonny produced an Oscar nominated movie, but now he finds he's no longer relevant in a Hollywood that's been taken over by a younger generation.

Knowing that he is soon going to die or be forgotten, he decides to wager all his strength in one last movie, something for which he can be remembered. His chance comes in the form of a brilliant screenplay optioned from a promising young writer. But when Black undercuts the deal and eases Sonny out, Sonny has seventy-two hours to come up with enough money to purchase the script for himself. In desperation, he turns to the mafia to borrow the $50,000 he needs.

== Cast ==
- Burt Reynolds as Sonny Wexler
- Rod Steiger as Sheri Ganse
- Benjamin Bratt as Damon Black
- Ann-Margret as Mira Verder
- Lauren Holly as Frances Chadway
- Sean Astin as Bo Pomerantz
- Kim Chase as Teddy
- Charles Durning as Syd Wolf
- Robert Goulet as Henry Moore
- Erin Gray as Dee Freeman
- E. J. Peaker as Rosie
- Robert Costanzo as Moogian
- Arthur Darbinyan as Nidal
- Charles Lanyer as Biderman
- Greg Germann as Ruben Tallridge
- Marnie McPhail as Julia Tallridge
- Paul McCrane as Austin Green
- Marvin J. McIntyre as Manny
- Ed O'Ross as Sarky
- Cynthia Palmer as Maude Chasen
- Jeannette Papineau as Niki
- Angie Dickinson as Poker Player
- Tony Denison as Poker Player (credited as Anthony John Denison)
- James Farentino as Poker Player
- Alex Rocco as Poker Player
- Shelley Berman as Poker Player
- Shecky Greene as Poker Player (credited as Shecky Green)
- Heidi Kaufman as Dancer
- Kimberly Pullis as Cocktail Waitress
- Joe Mantegna as Extra (uncredited)

== Production ==
The film was financed by the Kushner Locke Company.

Filming started May 1999.

== Home media ==
The film was released on home video in Iceland and Argentina in 2000 before airing on television in the U.S. in 2001. It was later re-titled The Last Hit for its U.S. home video release.
