= The Intruder (2019 film) =

- Theatrical release poster with original release month
- Directed by: Deon Taylor
- Written by: David Loughery
- Produced by: Deon Taylor; Roxanne Avent; Mark Burg; Brad Kaplan; Jonathan Schwartz
- Starring: Michael Ealy; Meagan Good; Joseph Sikora; Dennis Quaid
- Cinematography: Daniel Pearl
- Edited by: Melissa Kent
- Music by: Geoff Zanelli
- Production companies: Screen Gems; Hidden Empire Film Group; Primary Wave Entertainment
- Distributed by: Sony Pictures Releasing
- Release date: May 3, 2019 (United States)
- Running time: 102 minutes
- Country: United States
- Language: English
- Budget: $8 million
- Box office: $40.6 million

The Intruder is a 2019 American psychological thriller film directed by Deon Taylor and written by David Loughery. The film stars Michael Ealy and Meagan Good as a couple who buy a house in the country, only to realize its previous owner (Dennis Quaid) refuses to let it go. It was released in the United States on May 3, 2019, by Sony Pictures Releasing, receiving generally negative reviews from critics. However, it was a commercial success, grossing $40 million worldwide against its $8 million budget.

== Plot ==
Scott (Michael Ealy) and Annie Howard (Meagan Good) purchase a Napa Valley house called "Foxglove" from its previous owner, Charlie Peck (Dennis Quaid). Charlie explains his wife, Ellen, died of cancer two years earlier and he will soon be moving to Florida to live with his daughter, Cassidy.

Scott and Annie invite their friend Mike and his wife over to spend the night. When Mike goes outside for a cigarette, he senses he is being watched. The following morning, when Mike and his wife are leaving, he notices a cigarette burn on the seat of his luxury car that wasn't there previously. Annie eventually discovers Charlie mowing their lawn, but afterwards, invites him to a Thanksgiving dinner. That night, Scott and Mike discover someone in the woods, prompting Scott to install security cameras in their home. Charlie comes and orders the workers to stop the work, but Scott fends him off. Charlie continues to show up without an invitation; he explains he is not moving to Florida just yet, and is staying at the Royal Hotel in town. Tensions rise between Scott and Annie due to Scott's coldness toward Charlie, and Annie's disbelief. During Christmas, Charlie helps Annie decorate, and Scott has drinks with his clients. Scott returns home immediately but has an argument with Annie. They reconcile after they wake up in the middle of the night from a noise, and have sex on the floor, unaware that Charlie is watching.

A neighbour tells Scott that Charlie's wife killed herself with one of Charlie's shotguns. Meanwhile, Charlie has developed an obsession with Annie and begins visiting her at home when Scott is not there. One morning, while Scott is out jogging, a truck runs him down from behind; it turns out that Charlie was the driver of the truck. Mike uncovers that Charlie had gone into debt and faced legal trouble and therefore was forced to sell the house to Scott and Annie. While Scott is in the hospital recuperating from injuries, Charlie shows up at the house, and he and Annie have dinner. Mike goes to check on her and is confronted by Charlie, who declares he has a chance to get back all he lost and must get rid of Scott. Charlie then kills Mike with an axe.

The next morning, Scott contacts Cassidy, who has since changed her name, but she hangs up when Scott mentions her father and the house she grew up in. Scott also discovers Charlie has never stayed at the Royal Hotel downtown. Charlie appears in the house and passionately declares his feelings for Annie. She claims she is feeling ill and calmly asks Charlie to leave, which he does. Annie then goes upstairs and finds a hidden door behind the linen closet, leading to Charlie's underground cellar, where he has been living the whole time ever since he sold the house. Meanwhile, Scott is driving home and receives a call back from Cassidy who explains her father, Charlie is a pathological liar and a psychopath who murdered her mother when she threatened a divorce.

Back at the house, Charlie discovers that Annie has found his cellar. He knocks her unconscious, carries her upstairs and begins assaulting her. When Scott returns home, Charlie ambushes him and throws him over the hallway balcony. Charlie begins strangling Annie, but Scott reappears. The two men clash and Annie stabs Charlie in the back. Charlie staggers away to the cellar, where he grabs a shotgun.

Scott and Annie hide behind the bedroom door as Charlie searches the house for them. When Charlie enters a room, Scott bashes him on the head with a baseball bat and snatches the rifle. Lying on the floor bleeding, Charlie taunts Scott by saying he can't shoot him because the rifle is unloaded, but Scott tells Charlie to check his pockets confirming otherwise. As they stand over Charlie, Annie calls 911 and informs the dispatcher that her husband has just shot an intruder. Horrified and heartbroken, Charlie screams, "You don't deserve Foxglove!" Scott replies, "Go to hell," and shoots Charlie, killing him.

== Cast ==
- Michael Ealy as Scott Howard
- Meagan Good as Annie Howard
- Dennis Quaid as Charlie Peck
- Joseph Sikora as Mike
- Alvina August as Rachel
- Lee Shorten as Brian
- Erica Cerra as Jillian Richards
- Kurt Evans as Grady Kramer
- Carolyn Anderson as Ellen
- Lili Sepe as Cassidy Peck Thompson / Vanessa Smith
- Raylene Herewood as Ice Cream Girl
- Chris Shields as Doctor
- Sam Vincent as First Officer
- Caroline Muthoni Muita as Hotel Receptionist
- Connor Mackay as Man On Ladder
- Bryan Cobaris as Police Chief

In May 2018, Ealy, Good and Quaid all signed onto the project. It was then announced that the worldwide distribution rights had been acquired by Screen Gems at the 2018 Cannes Film Festival, after production had been completed under the title Motivated Seller.

== Release ==
The Intruder was released in the United States on May 3, 2019. It was previously set for an April 26, 2019 release, but was pushed back a week to separate from Avengers: Endgame. The film was released on Blu-Ray and DVD on July 30, 2019.

== Reception ==
=== Box office ===
The Intruder grossed $35.4 million in the United States and Canada, and $5.2 million in other territories, for a worldwide total of $40.6 million, against a production budget of $8 million.

In the United States and Canada, The Intruder was released alongside Long Shot and UglyDolls, and was projected to gross $9–16 million from 2,222 theaters in its opening weekend. The film made $3.9 million on its first day, including $865,000 from Thursday night previews. It went on to debut to $11 million, finishing second, behind holdover Avengers: Endgame. The film grossed $6.6 million in its second weekend, finishing in fourth.

=== Critical response ===
On review aggregator Rotten Tomatoes, the film holds an approval rating of 35% based on 104 reviews, with an average rating of 4.3/10. The website's critical consensus reads, "The Intruder might appeal to fans of shout-at-the-screen cinema, but this thriller's ludicrous plot robs it of suspense – and undermines Dennis Quaid's suitably over-the-top performance." On Metacritic, the film has a weighted average score of 39 out of 100, based on 25 critics, indicating "generally unfavorable reviews". Audiences polled by CinemaScore gave the film an average grade of "B−" on an A+ to F scale, while those at PostTrak gave it 2.5 out of 5 stars and a 44% "definite recommend".

== See also ==
- List of black films of the 2010s
