= David Loughery =

American screenwriter and film producer (1953–2024)

- Born: March 3, 1953; Oak Park, Illinois, U.S.
- Died: July 9, 2024 (aged 71); St. Petersburg, Florida, U.S.
- Education: Ball State University (BA); University of Iowa (MFA)
- Occupations: Film producer, screenwriter

David Loughery (March 3, 1953 – July 9, 2024) was an American screenwriter and film producer.

== Personal life and death ==
Loughery was born in Oak Park, Illinois, on March 3, 1953. Loughery secured employment as a television writer in 1979 after winning a screenwriting contest sponsored by Columbia Pictures, while a student at the University of Iowa. He died from skin cancer in St. Petersburg, Florida, on July 9, 2024, at the age of 71.

== Filmography ==
=== Writer ===
- Dreamscape (1984)
- The Stepfather (1987) (uncredited)
- Star Trek V: The Final Frontier (1989)
- Flashback (1990)
- Passenger 57 (1992)
- The Good Son (1993) (uncredited)
- The Three Musketeers (1993)
- Money Train (1995)
- Tom and Huck (1995)
- Lakeview Terrace (2008)
- Obsessed (2009)
- Penthouse North (2013)
- Nurse 3D (2013)
- The Intruder (2019)
- Fatale (2020)
- Shattered (2022)
- End of the Road (2022)

=== Producer ===
- Flashback (1990) (co-producer)
- Lakeview Terrace (2008) (executive producer)
- Obsessed (2009) (executive producer)
- Penthouse North (2013) (producer)
- The Intruder (2019) (executive producer)
- Fatale (2020) (executive producer)
- Shattered (2022) (executive producer)
