= Francis Stevens (disambiguation) =

Francis Stevens was a pseudonym of writer Gertrude Barrows Bennett (1884–1948).

Francis Stevens may also refer to:

- Francis George Stevens (1891–?), British civil engineer who founded Scouting in Sri Lanka
- Paul Stevens (bobsleigh) (Francis Paul Stephens, 1889–1949), Olympic bobsledder
- Frankie Stevens (Francis Stevens, born 1950), New Zealand entertainer and singer

== See also ==
- Frances Simpson Stevens (1894–1976), American painter
- Frank Stevens (disambiguation)
- Francis Stephens (disambiguation)
