= Hollows Grove =

- Directed by: Craig Efros
- Written by: Craig Efros
- Produced by: Gary Adelman; Craig Efros; Mel Efros; Tony Palermo
- Starring: Mykelti Williamson; Lance Henriksen; Matthew Carey
- Cinematography: Sidney Sidell
- Edited by: Sam Bauer
- Production company: Hollows Grove
- Release date: October 21, 2014
- Running time: 81 minutes
- Country: United States
- Language: English

Hollows Grove, also released as Orphanage the Haunting at Hollows Grove, is a 2014 independent horror film and the feature film directorial debut of Craig Efros. It was released as a digital download on 21 October 2014 and stars Matthew Carey as a filmmaker that decides to create a documentary centering upon a ghost hunting team, only to find that this could be the last thing he ever does.

== Synopsis ==
The film is framed with footage of an FBI agent (Mykelti Williamson), who introduces the footage as material shot during an episode for the paranormal investigation show S.P.I.T. (Spirit Paranormal Investigation Team). Most of the footage is taken from the camera of Harold (Matthew Carey), who was accompanying the team in order to shoot a documentary, but is interspersed with footage from other cameras on set. The movie then cuts to the start of Harold's footage.

Harold is shown to be a down-on-his-luck filmmaker, as he finds his normal job (creating footage for a comedy show) unfulfilling and has recently broken up with his girlfriend. He's hoping that the documentary on S.P.I.T. will give him some much needed exposure in the entertainment world, but is disappointed when he finds that all of the supernatural elements and evidence seen on the show are fake, engineered by their special effects coordinator Bill (Lance Henriksen) for maximum entertainment. Despite this, he decides to continue with filming, as the group will be traveling to Hollows Grove, a former orphanage and hospital known for being exceptionally haunted.

At the site the building's caretaker Hector (Eddie Perez) tries to convince the group to leave, as he believes the Grove to be genuinely dangerous, as many people have died while investigating the building. However, the group chooses to ignore his advice and enters the building anyway. Once inside, they experience a number of seemingly paranormal events, which they dismiss as some of Bill's stunts. It's only when one of the events includes the dead body of a cat that they begin to become unsettled and start wondering if the events are truly real. As the night progresses the group experiences more and more phenomena, forcing them to realize that Hector's warnings were legitimate. These phenomena also result in separating the group members as they're attacked and killed one by one. Attempts to escape are unsuccessful. Eventually only Harold remains and he tries one last time to flee, only for him to be attacked and dragged into the building's basement, where he's thrown into a boiler and burned alive.

The film ends with Jones stating that the FBI investigated the building and found that there were no survivors save for one member, Julie (Bresha Webb), who is stuck in a coma after she threw herself out of a window. He also informs the viewer that they did find one piece of evidence, a swirling fog trapped in a clear container. As the film ends, a face surfaces in the fog and lunges at the camera. After the credits Julie is shown waking up in the hospital but is also revealed to be supernaturally possessed.

== Cast ==
- Mykelti Williamson as FBI Agent Jones
- Lance Henriksen as Bill
- Matthew Carey as Harold Maxwell
- Sunkrish Bala as Roger Rafkin
- Bresha Webb as Julie Mercade
- Val Morrison as Chad Groan
- Matt Doherty as Tim Royce
- Eddie Perez as Hector Gustavo
- Gary Sievers as Homeless Man
- Tanc Sade as George
- Lindsey Smith-Sands as Nurse
- Michael Scott Allen as Additional Voice

== Reception ==
Critical reception has been negative. Dread Central gave Hollows Grove one star, writing that while they were "mildly amused at the idea of how full of crap the crew knew they were about their show and its production", the film was ultimately a disappointment. HorrorNews.net was slightly more positive and they praised the performances from Henriksen and Doherty but overall panned the film for being too "tightly tucked inside the established blue print for this kind of found footage film, it never pushes any boundaries nor reaches for any taboos or new ground. It is decidedly by the books which makes it often dull."
