= The House Next Door: Meet the Blacks 2 =

2021 film by Deon Taylor

- Theatrical release poster
- Directed by: Deon Taylor
- Screenplay by: Corey Harrell; Deon Taylor
- Story by: Corey Harrell
- Produced by: Deon Taylor; Roxanne Avent; Omar Joseph; Mike Epps; Angi Bones; Shannon McIntosh
- Starring: Mike Epps; Katt Williams; Bresha Webb; Lil Duval; Zulay Henao; Tyrin Turner; Michael Blackson; Andrew Bachelor; Gary Owen; Danny Trejo
- Cinematography: Dave Perkal
- Edited by: Suzanne Hines; Peck Prior
- Music by: Geoff Zanelli
- Production companies: Hidden Empire Film Group; Naptown Productions
- Distributed by: Hidden Empire Film Group
- Release date: June 11, 2021
- Running time: 97 minutes
- Country: United States
- Language: English
- Budget: $3.5 million
- Box office: $2.9 million

The House Next Door: Meet the Blacks 2 is a 2021 American parody black comedy horror film directed by Deon Taylor, and written by Taylor and Corey Harrell. A sequel to the 2016 film Meet the Blacks, it stars Mike Epps and Katt Williams, with Bresha Webb, Lil Duval, Zulay Henao, Tyrin Turner, Michael Blackson, Andrew Bachelor, Gary Owen and Danny Trejo in supporting roles. In the film, which primarily satirizes Fright Night, Carl Black (Epps) moves his family back to his childhood home, encountering a mysterious new neighbor (Williams), a pimp who may be a vampire.

The House Next Door was produced by Taylor's Hidden Empire Film Group and Epps' Naptown Productions, and filmed in Atlanta from October to November 2017. Delayed from original October 2019 release, the film was theatrically released in the United States by Hidden Empire on June 11, 2021. It was a box office bomb and received largely negative reviews from critics.

== Plot ==
After surviving the events of the first film and becoming an author, Carl Black moves his family back to his childhood home in Atlanta, where he hopes to continue working on his new book. There, the Blacks encounter their mysterious new next-door neighbor, Dr. Mamuwalde, a pimp whom Carl suspects is a vampire trying to take his family.

== Cast ==
- Mike Epps as Carl Black
- Katt Williams as Dr. Mamuwalde
- Bresha Webb as Allie Black
- Lil Duval as Cronut
- Zulay Henao as Lorena
- Tyrin Turner as "Big Head" Rico
- Snoop Dogg as Himself
- Michael Blackson as Mr. Wooky
- Alex Henderson as Carl Black Jr.
- Rick Ross as Mr. Saturday
- Andrew Bachelor as "Freezee"
- Gary Owen as Clive
- Danny Trejo as Hugo

== Production ==
In October 2017, it was reported that Deon Taylor would direct the horror comedy film The House Next Door, a sequel to his 2016 film Meet the Blacks. Mike Epps would reprise his role of Carl Black from the first film, starring alongside Katt Williams. The two had previously starred together in the 2002 film Friday After Next. Other cast members confirmed to be reprising their roles from the first film were Bresha Webb, Zulay Henao, Lil Duval, Andrew Bachelor, Michael Blackson, and Tyrin Turner. In November 2017, it was announced that Rick Ross and Danny Trejo had been cast in the film.

The screenplay for The House Next Door was written by Taylor and Corey Harrell, based on a story by Harrell. It was produced by Taylor, Roxanne Avent and Omar Joseph through Hidden Empire Film Group, and by Epps, Angi Bones and Shannon McIntosh through Naptown Productions.

Filming took place in Atlanta, Georgia, from October 15 to November 17, 2017. Cinematographer Dave Perkal shot the film with Hawk V-Plus anamorphic lenses.

The film's score was composed by Geoff Zanelli.

== Release ==
In February 2019, Taylor posted on Facebook that the film would be released that October. However, the film was eventually delayed, and not released into theaters in the United States until June 11, 2021, by Hidden Empire Film Group.

== Reception ==
=== Box office ===
In its opening weekend, the film earned $1 million from 420 theaters, finishing seventh at the box office. It earned a total of $2,893,660.

=== Critical reception ===
The House Next Door: Meet the Blacks 2 holds a 17% approval rating on review aggregator website Rotten Tomatoes, based on six reviews, with a weighted average of 2/10.
