= Francis Stephens =

Francis or Frances Stephens may refer to:

- Francis Stephens (scientist), see List of fellows of the Royal Society S, T, U, V
- Frances Stephens (philanthropist) (1851–1915), Canadian of Scottish origin prominent in Montreal society
- Frances Stephens (golfer) (1924–1978), English Curtis Cup player

== See also ==
- Frank Stephens (disambiguation)
- Francis Stevens (disambiguation)
- Francis Stephen, Holy Roman Emperor
