= Shannon McIntosh (filmmaker) =

American film producer

- Occupation: film producer

Shannon McIntosh is an American film producer. She is a recipient of the Golden Globe Award for Best Motion Picture – Musical or Comedy for producing Once Upon a Time in Hollywood.

== Filmography ==
=== Films ===
- Grindhouse (2007) — executive producer
- Death Proof (2007) — executive producer
- Django Unchained (2012) — executive producer
- Angels Sing (2012) — producer
- Tusk (2014) — producer
- The Hateful Eight (2015) — producer
- Meet the Blacks (2016) — producer
- Once Upon a Time in Hollywood (2019) — producer
- The House Next Door: Meet the Blacks 2 (2021) – producer
- Cinderella (2021) – producer
