= Delgo =

2008 American animated film

- Theatrical release poster
- Directed by: Marc F. Adler; Jason Maurer
- Screenplay by: Patrick J. Cowan; Carl Dream; Jennifer A. Jones
- Story by: Marc F. Adler; Scott Biear; Jason Maurer
- Starring: Freddie Prinze Jr. Jennifer Love Hewitt; Anne Bancroft; Chris Kattan; Michael Clarke Duncan; Louis Gossett Jr. Eric Idle; Val Kilmer; Malcolm McDowell; Burt Reynolds; Kelly Ripa
- Narrated by: Sally Kellerman
- Cinematography: Herb Kossover
- Music by: Geoff Zanelli
- Production companies: Electric Eye Entertainment Corporation; Fathom Studios
- Distributed by: Freestyle Releasing
- Release date: December 12, 2008
- Running time: 89 minutes
- Country: United States
- Language: English
- Budget: $40 million
- Box office: $694,782 – $915,840

Delgo is a 2008 American animated fantasy adventure film directed by Marc F. Adler and Jason Maurer, written by Scott Biear, Patrick J. Cowan, Carl Dream, and Jennifer A. Jones. The film stars Freddie Prinze Jr., Jennifer Love Hewitt, Anne Bancroft, Chris Kattan, Louis Gossett Jr., Burt Reynolds, Eric Idle, Michael Clarke Duncan, Kelly Ripa, Val Kilmer, and Malcolm McDowell with narration by Sally Kellerman. It was the final film for Bancroft and John Vernon, who both died three years before its release, and was dedicated to the former.

The film was distributed by Freestyle Releasing with music by Geoff Zanelli and produced by Electric Eye Entertainment Corporation and Fathom Studios, a division of Macquarium Intelligent Communications, which began development of the project in 1999.

Despite winning the Best Feature award at Anima Mundi, the film was widely panned by critics and audiences, and its box office was one of the lowest-grossing wide releases in recent history. Delgo grossed under $1 million in theaters against an estimated budget of $40 million. The film was released independently with a large screen count (over 2,000 screens) and a small marketing budget. As a result, it became a massive box office bomb, losing an estimated $46 million. 20th Century Fox later acquired the film rights for international and domestic home media distribution.

== Plot ==
After having left their own world due to a loss of natural resources, the winged humanoid Nohrin settle on Jhamora with the permission of the ground-dwelling Lokni. Would-be conqueror Sedessa leads those Nohrin that believe in its own racial superiority and try to take land away from the Lokni. The parents of Delgo, a Lokni, are killed in the resulting conflict. Nohrin King Zahn is horrified by the war and admonishes Sedessa, who then poisons the Queen and almost kills Zahn (who catches her) as well. She is subsequently banished, and her wings are clipped off.

Delgo, meanwhile, is raised by Elder Marley, who tries to teach him how to use the power of magical stones. Delgo grows up, and he gives in to his desire for revenge against all Nohrin. He meets Nohrin Princess Kyla and develops a tentative friendship with her. When she is kidnapped by Nohrin General Raius, who is actually working for Sedessa, Delgo and his friend Filo are blamed and arrested.

In the Nohrin prison, Delgo meets Nohrin General Bogardus, who was forced to illegally gamble with his weapons by Raius, because Bogardus opposed an all out war with the Lokni. Delgo, Filo, and Bogardus escape into some caverns and eventually reach Sedessa's stronghold and rescue Kyla. They return too late to avert a war taking place. Bogardus fights and defeats Raius, but he is mortally injured.

Just as Bogardus dies from heavy wounds, Delgo realizes that he was the Nohrin soldier who spared his life many years ago during the first war between the Nohrin and the Lokni. Meanwhile, Sedessa's army of monsters joins in the battle. Kyla convinces the Nohrin generals to direct their troops to stop fighting the Lokni and instead pick them up and fly them away from the battlefield. Filo then directs an entire stampede of large animals onto the battlefield, sending Sedessa's minions fleeing for their lives.

Delgo goes off to face Sedessa and find King Zahn, whom she has taken prisoner. He finally manages to master the stone magic, and defeats Sedessa. He also puts the past behind him by saving her rather than letting her fall to her death. However, Sedessa then attacks Kyla, who has come to Delgo's aid. The two struggle and Sedessa finally falls to her death when the floor collapses under her, her artificial wings being of no use. Later, during the celebrations, it turns out Raius was not dead, and he makes one last attempt to kill Delgo. However, he is subdued by a Nohrin, but not before he throws his spear at Delgo. Then, out of nowhere, the spear breaks in midair. Everyone turns to look at Filo, who has finally mastered his slingshot. Delgo and Kyla's friendship eventually blossoms into romance when they finally kiss.

== Cast ==
- Freddie Prinze Jr. as Delgo
  - Mary Matilyn Mouser as Baby Delgo
- Jennifer Love Hewitt as Princess Kyla
- Anne Bancroft as Empress Sedessa
- Chris Kattan as Filo
- Louis Gossett Jr. as King Zahn
- Val Kilmer as General Bogardus
- Malcolm McDowell as General Raius
- Michael Clarke Duncan as Elder Marley
- Eric Idle as Spig
- Kelly Ripa as Kurrin
- Burt Reynolds as Delgo's father
- Brad Abrell as Spog
- David Heyer as Talusi
- John Vernon as Judge Nohrin
- Jed Rhein as Ando
- Melissa McBride as Miss Sutley, Elder Pearo
- Jeff Winter as Giddy, Lochni Man
- Armin Shimerman as Nohrin Merchant
- Don Stallings as Gelmore, Elder Kiros
- Tristan Rogers as Nohrin Officer
- Gustavo Rex as Elder Canta
- Nika Futterman as Elder Jaspin
- Susan Bennett as Melsa
- Louis K. Adler as the Soldiers
- Sally Kellerman as the Narrator

== Production ==
Fathom Studios began development on Delgo in 1999; animation work began in 2001. The movie was produced by Fathom in conjunction with Electric Eye Entertainment Corporation. In a 2001 interview, Marc Adler said that the film sets itself apart from other recent computer-animated films because it is not a comedy and also because it is "a very human story told in a non-human world". Maurer said that "the inspiration for the story really came from all of the unrest we have in society today, prejudice, discrimination, hate crimes, violence – all of those terrible things. We wanted to tell a story where our heroes overcame these things personally and facilitated change among entire peoples." Fathom launched a "Digital Dailies" feature on the movie's official website, allowing fans to follow the production as it happened. Animators would post their work daily on the message board system and fans could see the directors' and producers' input as well as subsequent changes to the scenes. Chief Animator and Artistic Director Derek Winslow went on record in the January 2001 issue of US weekly, stating that "Delgo would be his finest creation" and "would outperform Shrek at the box office". According to Adler, although the original intent of the dailies was to allow the crew to "be able to offer commentary to other staff members who do not work the same hours", he also said that offering a learning experience to the public was an important reason for their creation. "By granting public access to our film as a work-in-process we are helping to educate students, burgeoning animators, and film enthusiasts about the procedures involved in the making of a computer animated movie." Adler said that they were "contacted by professors from the many universities who use[d] the Digital Dailies in their classrooms". The dailies "were receiving a half-million hits a month", and some of the crew members started to get offers from Hollywood studios (at one point Adler started hiding the identities of the crew with fancy aliases).

Adler recruited main crew members locally from "Savannah College of Art and Design, Georgia Tech and smaller digital outfits". Students from the drama department of North Atlanta High School acted out some of the scenes to create reference material for the animators. Adler said that their team created eight main characters, at least twenty "secondary characters", "twenty-two creatures, thirty plants, and fifty-six sets", as well as numerous background characters. According to Warren Grubb, Fathom's head animation director, one of the challenges with modeling the background elements was that "We couldn't even use most of the off-the-shelf systems at the time in creating the background assets because they were based on Earthly vegetation." The filmmakers put together kits with artwork and actual replicas of the stones used in the film to send to the actors, rather than just an offer letter. Once the cast had signed on, the filmmakers had to travel to where the actors were with all their equipment rather than have the actors come to them to record their voices. Anne Bancroft, the voice of villainess Sedessa, died in 2005, before production finished. On the film's end credits, the film is dedicated to her. Aside from the death of Bancroft, the film had several other setbacks which delayed its release. John Vernon, the voice of Judge Nohrin, also died in 2005, making this his final film. The directors acknowledge the influence of artist Roger Dean, specifically his album covers for Yes and Asia, on their backgrounds. A partnership with Dell provided Fathom Studios with the hardware required to render Delgo.

In 2004, Playmates Toys revealed in an article that they planned to make Delgo merchandise, which included dolls, action figures, play sets, vehicles and toy accessories. Ultimately, they never followed through.

== Distribution ==
Metro-Goldwyn-Mayer was originally expected to release the picture, but an executive restructuring altered these plans. In addition, Kevin Foster, the president of Fathom Studios' parent company Macquarium, died of heart failure during production, causing attention to be drawn away from the film for almost a year. Distributor-for-hire Freestyle Releasing distributed the film to 2,160 theaters in the United States.

== Reception ==
=== Box office ===
Delgo bombed at the box office and is notable for producing, at the time, the worst opening ever for a film playing in over 2,000 theaters. It is one of the lowest-grossing animated films of all time and was pulled from theaters after one week of release. According to Yahoo! Movies, this averages approximately two viewers per screening. In 2012, another Freestyle Releasing film, The Oogieloves in the Big Balloon Adventure, became the new holder of this record, earning only $443,901 on its opening weekend. Delgo is also the lowest-grossing computer-animated film of all time, with just $915,840 made worldwide, a record formerly held by the 2006 film Doogal ($7.2 million in the United States).

=== Critical response ===
On the review aggregator website Rotten Tomatoes, 12% of 42 critics' reviews are positive, with an average rating of 3.7/10. The website's consensus reads: "Delgo features a blend of plot elements from earlier (and superior) fantasy films, with weaker animation and dull characters." Metacritic, which uses a weighted average, assigned the film a score of 27 out of 100, based on 10 critics, indicating "generally unfavorable" reviews.

Leonard Maltin's publication TV Movies gave the film a "BOMB" rating, calling it "a complete misfire". Critics from Newsday and Campus Circle gave the film acclaim, citing a unique look.

Tom Keogh of The Seattle Times praised Bancroft's "excellent voice work" and noted the film was a "busy but decent animated fable that feels like a Star Wars or Lord of the Rings spin-off".

=== Awards ===
Despite its performance, Delgo was accepted by numerous film festivals, including the three largest animation festivals in the world: SICAF (Korea), Annecy (France), and Anima Mundi (Brazil). Delgo received the "Best Feature Film" award at 2008's Anima Mundi.

== Home media ==
20th Century Fox Home Entertainment released Delgo on DVD on August 4, 2009. A Blu-ray Disc was released on October 5, 2010. The DVD extras include an audio commentary from the directors, featurettes, six deleted scenes, and the short "Chroma Chameleon".

== Impact ==
According to The Wall Street Journal, "the failure of Delgo to attract audiences reflects a glut of films in the crowded holiday corridor and highlights the challenges facing films made and marketed outside the Hollywood system."

Although Delgo was conceived and written as the first installment of an intended trilogy, plans for it were cancelled when the film bombed critically and financially.

On August 26, 2009, the makers of Delgo were considering suing James Cameron for Avatar, claiming that it stole assets, ideas, visuals, and concepts from Delgo. The case was eventually dropped.

== See also ==
- List of animated feature films
- List of computer-animated films
- List of biggest box office bombs
- List of films with longest production time
