= Fatale (film) =

2020 American psychological thriller film by Deon Taylor

- Theatrical release poster
- Directed by: Deon Taylor
- Written by: David Loughery
- Produced by: Roxanne Avent; Hilary Swank; Deon Taylor
- Starring: Hilary Swank; Michael Ealy; Mike Colter; Danny Pino
- Cinematography: Dante Spinotti
- Edited by: Eric L. Beason
- Music by: Geoff Zanelli
- Production companies: Summit Entertainment; Endeavor Content; Hidden Empire Film Group
- Distributed by: Lionsgate
- Release date: December 18, 2020
- Running time: 102 minutes
- Country: United States
- Language: English
- Box office: $7 million

Fatale is a 2020 American psychological thriller film directed by Deon Taylor, from a screenplay by David Loughery. The film stars Hilary Swank, Michael Ealy, Mike Colter, and Danny Pino.

Fatale was released in the United States on December 18, 2020, by Lionsgate. The film received mixed reviews from critics and grossed $7 million worldwide.

== Plot ==
Derrick Tyler is a former college basketball player who has gone on to build a successful sports management agency in Los Angeles with his best friend Rafe Grimes, representing African-American athletes. His marriage to Tracie, a real estate agent, is strained, all the while he suspects she is having an affair with someone else. Rafe is also pressuring him to sell the company to a larger corporation, which Derrick, valuing his independence, refuses to do.

During a business trip to Las Vegas, Rafe encourages Derrick to vent his frustrations by having a fling of his own. Removing his wedding ring and introducing himself as "Darren from Seattle", Derrick catches the attention of a woman at a bar. She admits she is also looking for casual sex, and after flirting on the dance floor, they end up in her hotel room. While trying to sneak out the next morning, Derrick discovers that she has locked his cellphone in the room safe and is coerced into having sex with her again in exchange for his phone.

Returning to Los Angeles, a guilty Derrick reconciles with Tracie. That night, Derrick hears what sounds like a break-in; investigating, he is attacked by a masked burglar and barely manages to fight him off. The police arrive and a detective assigned to the case, Valerie Quinlan, is revealed to be the same woman from Las Vegas. Valerie asks Tracie questions that have no relevance to the break-in and implies to Derrick that she could be compelled to reveal his affair or, for a price, keep silent. In her spare time, Valerie stalks her ex-husband, local politician Carter Heywood, who filed a restraining order against her after Valerie left her service weapon unattended while drunk and their daughter, Haley, accidentally shot herself, leaving the latter using a wheelchair. Valerie has also been stripped of custody rights and is desperate to get her daughter back, hoping a corruption scandal Carter is embroiled in will work in her favor.

During her investigation, Valerie discovers that Tracie is cheating on Derrick with Rafe. She informs Derrick of this by encouraging him to peer into the window at the beach house where they rendezvous with a monocular she hands him to see for himself. Valerie also suggests that Tracie hired the burglar to kill Derrick. The shock and anguish is enough to briefly drive him back into Valerie's arms, before he confronts Tracie and Rafe directly, causing him to throw his wedding ring down as Tracie coldly mocks him. The next day, Derrick is arrested and Valerie tells him that Tracie and Rafe were murdered soon after he left them. The suspicion this throws on Derrick ruins his reputation and a district attorney intends to file charges.

Realizing Valerie committed the murders herself, Derrick confides in his cousin Tyrin who then, along with a friend, breaks into Valerie's apartment intending to force a confession, but she manages to distract them and gains the upper hand in the ensuing scuffle, shooting them both dead. Valerie then offers to frame Tyrin instead of Derrick for Tracie and Rafe's murders if he agrees to kill Carter, who has made it clear to Valerie that he can manipulate the courts in his favor and she will never see Haley again. Derrick approaches Carter while he is jogging and attempts to warn him, but a struggle ensues and Carter is accidentally shot dead.

Derrick goes to Valerie's apartment where she admits to killing Tracie, Rafe, Tyrin and Tyrin's friend. Valerie says she will kill anyone who prevents her from retrieving Haley. Derrick realizes this includes him and they shoot each other. As a wounded Derrick leaves, Valerie blindsides and stabs him repeatedly before he shoots her again, this time fatally. As Valerie dies, Derrick reveals that he recorded her confession and goes to meet the arriving police.

== Cast ==
- Hilary Swank as Det. Valerie Quinlan
- Michael Ealy as Derrick Tyler
- Mike Colter as Rafe Grimes
- Danny Pino as Carter Haywood
- Tyrin Turner as Tyrin Abenathy
- Sam Daly as Officer Stallman
- David Hoflin as Officer Lowe
- Damaris Lewis as Tracie Tyler
- Geoffrey Owens as Bill Cranepool
- Kali Hawk as Micaela

== Production ==
In August 2018, Hilary Swank joined the cast of the film, with Deon Taylor directing from a screenplay by David Loughery. Taylor, Roxanne Avent, and Robert F. Smith produced the film, under their Hidden Empire Film Group. Endeavor Content also produced the film. In September 2018, Michael Ealy, Mike Colter, Damaris Lewis, Tyrin Turner and Geoffrey Owens joined the cast of the film.

Principal photography began in Los Angeles in September 2018.

== Release ==
In August 2019, Lionsgate acquired distribution rights to the film. It was initially scheduled to be released on June 19, 2020, but was postponed due to the COVID-19 pandemic. It was then scheduled to be released on October 30, 2020, however, it was pushed to 2021 in early October. However on November 23, 2020, it was moved up to December 18, 2020. It was released via video on demand on January 8, 2021 by Lionsgate Home Entertainment.

== Reception ==
=== Box office ===
In the United States and Canada, Fatale was released alongside Monster Hunter and was projected to gross $1 million from 1,107 theaters in its opening weekend. The film grossed $330,000 on its first day and ended up opening to $918,112, finishing third at the box office. The film fell to sixth in its second weekend, grossing $659,825, then made $701,561 in its third weekend.

=== Critical response ===
On Rotten Tomatoes, the film holds an approval rating of 45% based on 67 reviews, with an average rating of 4.9/10. The website's critics consensus reads: "While it's better than a fair number of other adultery-fueled stalker films, Fatale fails to generate as much heat as the superior erotic thrillers it evokes." Metacritic reports a weighted average score of 42 out of 100 based on 13 critics, indicating "mixed or average" reviews. Audiences polled by CinemaScore gave the film an average grade of "B+" on an A+ to F scale.

Michael Ordona of the Los Angeles Times said it was fun to see Swank in a "different part" than her other films. Glenn Kenny of The New York Times said that although the film "never builds up the froth of lurid delirium that brings genre pictures into a headier dimension, it's got enough juice to hold your attention". Mick LaSalle of the San Francisco Chronicle gave the film 2.5 out of 4 stars, saying that although the movie was "not necessarily good", the film "involves some real craftsmanship in terms of story".

Christy Lemire of RogerEbert.com was more critical in her review and gave the film 1 out of 4 stars, saying that it "never fulfills its promise as a lurid, guilty pleasure".

== See also ==
- List of films set in Las Vegas
