= Black and Blue (2019 film) =

Film directed by Deon Taylor

- Theatrical release poster
- Directed by: Deon Taylor
- Written by: Peter A. Dowling
- Produced by: Sean Sorensen
- Starring: Naomie Harris; Tyrese Gibson; Frank Grillo; Mike Colter; Reid Scott; Beau Knapp
- Cinematography: Dante Spinotti
- Edited by: Peck Prior
- Music by: Geoff Zanelli
- Production companies: Screen Gems; Royal Viking Entertainment; Hidden Empire Film Group
- Distributed by: Sony Pictures Releasing
- Release dates: September 21, 2019 (Urbanworld); October 25, 2019 (United States)
- Running time: 108 minutes
- Country: United States
- Language: English
- Budget: $12 million
- Box office: $22.7 million

Black and Blue is a 2019 American action thriller film directed by Deon Taylor from a screenplay by Peter A. Dowling. The film stars Naomie Harris, Tyrese Gibson, Frank Grillo, Mike Colter, Reid Scott, and Beau Knapp. It follows a rookie police officer who goes on the run after she witnesses her colleagues commit a murder.

The film had its world premiere at the Urbanworld Film Festival on September 21, 2019, and was theatrically released in the United States on October 25, 2019, by Sony Pictures Releasing. It received mostly mixed reviews from critics.

== Plot ==
U.S. Army veteran Alicia West returns to her hometown of New Orleans, joining the police department. She is partnered with easygoing Kevin Jennings. Their beat includes the deprived neighbourhood where West grew up, and during one patrol, she meets an old friend, Milo "Mouse" Jackson, who now is a convenience store clerk. However, he acts as if he doesn't know her, as the community deeply distrusts the police.

To let Jennings have a date night with his wife, West offers to cover his double shift with patrolman Deacon "Deek" Brown. During their shift, he gets a call on his personal phone and drives to a derelict power station, ostensibly to meet the informant Zero. When they arrive, he orders West to wait in the car while he enters alone. West sees a crook trying to break into a vehicle and just as she is about to chase him, a gunshot rings out in the building, so West switches her target and enters the abandoned facility to check it out while wearing a bulletproof vest with a body camera. She stumbles on Brown and narcotics detectives Terry Malone and Smitty executing three unarmed drug pushers in cold blood. Malone attempts to explain the incriminating situation, but Smitty panics after seeing West's bodycam and shoots her multiple times. Her bulletproof vest catches the rounds but the aftershock from the impact sends West backward onto a section of weak flooring and she plummets several stories, landing on a garbage patch.

Despite being badly injured, West escapes on foot without her gun, with Malone, Smitty and Brown in pursuit. She tries to get civilians to help upon realizing that her dispatch radio is compromised, but is rejected as the community in the area hates the police. Then she notices an approaching squad car, seeking help from the two patrolmen inside. However, she realizes that they are also part of Malone's network of corrupt cops and thus compromised. She flees again and eventually finds sanctuary at Mouse's store, though he is initially reluctant to help and considers turning her over to her pursuers. Unsure who she can trust in the police department, West calls the off-duty Jennings and asks him for a lift to a police station so she can upload her bodycam footage to the police mainframe to get incontrovertible evidence against Malone and his cohorts on the record. During the journey, Jennings inadvertently reveals his knowledge of Malone being crooked. West, realizing that he intends to set her up, punches him, hits her pursuers with Jennings’s pick up and leaves him handcuffed to the steering wheel.

Malone frames West for the executions at the abandoned power station, leading to a bounty on West by drug kingpin Darius Tureau, whose nephew Zero was one of the executed victims. Hunted by both the police and Darius' gang, she again asks Mouse for shelter, this time at his apartment. He takes her in but his neighbor tips off the gangsters, who try to kill her. While learning that West's hideout at Mouse's house was blown, both try to flee but get caught by approaching gangbangers who want the bounty. A gunfight ensues with West shooting two of the gangbangers while Mouse buys time for West to flee after spotting another gangbanger climbing over a fence. Mouse grabs the assailant by his shotgun and tussles with him, buying time for West to escape. Mouse is captured in the process by Darius's men.

Unwilling to leave Mouse to his fate, West surrenders to Darius, explaining that she has proof of her innocence in her bodycam footage. Darius has his computer expert hack the bodycam and learns of West's innocence and Malone's treachery. Before Darius can act on this revelation, the police raid the apartment block. In the confusion, Smitty kills Brown (in revenge for what happened at the power station) but West kills Smitty. Malone kills Darius and most of his gang before searching the block for West. Knowing she cannot escape, West gives the bodycam and her jacket to Mouse. He slips through the police cordon, steals Malone's car and races to the police station, where he uploads the footage to the mainframe.

At the apartment block, Malone corners West, leading to a hand-to-hand struggle that eventually takes them to the courtyard in front of a crowd. She gets a hold of Malone's gun but has to drop it when armed police arrive to break up the fight. At that moment, the precinct captain, having seen the incriminating footage, radios the SWAT team, ordering them to stand down. Malone tries to shoot West, but her repentant partner Jennings incapacitates him. The wounded Malone is arrested and charged for the murders of the three drug dealers. West clears her name, earning her respect from both her fellow officers and the neighborhood. Later, she visits her mother's grave with Mouse. He tells West he owes her his life and kisses her on the forehead in thanks. They leave the cemetery together.

== Cast ==
- Naomie Harris as Officer Alicia West
- Tyrese Gibson as Milo "Mouse" Jackson
- Frank Grillo as Detective Terry Malone
- Mike Colter as Darius Tureau
- Reid Scott as Officer Kevin Jennings
- Beau Knapp as Detective Smitty
- Nafessa Williams as Missy
- James Moses Black as Officer Deacon "Deek" Brown
- Carsyn Taylor as Jamal
- Deneen Tyler as Captain Regina Hackett
- Michael Papajohn as Sergeant leader
- Nelson Bonilla as Doyle
- Frankie Smith as Tez
- John Charles II as Zero Tureau

== Production ==
In August 2017, it was announced Screen Gems had acquired Peter A. Dowling's spec script Exposure, and Sean Sorensen would produce the film under his Royal Viking Entertainment banner. In August 2018, it was announced Deon Taylor would direct the film, and Roxanne Avent would serve as an executive producer under her Hidden Empire Film Group banner. In December 2018, Naomie Harris joined the cast of the film, which was retitled from Exposure to Black and Blue. In January 2019, Frank Grillo, Reid Scott, Tyrese Gibson, Beau Knapp, Mike Colter and Nafessa Williams joined the cast of the film. In March 2019, James Moses Black joined the cast of the film. In April 2019, Frankie Smith joined the cast of the film.

=== Filming ===
Principal photography began on January 16, 2019, and concluded on February 28, 2019. The movie was shot using CineAlta cameras, Sony α7S II and Sony Xperia 1 smartphones. All these devices are marketed and manufactured by Sony, the parent company of Sony Pictures and Screen Gems.

== Release ==
Black and Blue had its world premiere at the Urbanworld Film Festival on September 21, 2019. It was released on October 25, 2019. It was previously scheduled to be released on September 20, 2019.

== Reception ==
=== Box office ===
In the United States and Canada, Black and Blue was released alongside The Current War and Countdown, and was projected to gross $8–11 million from 2,062 theaters in its opening weekend. It made $3.1 million on its first day, including $675,000 from Thursday night previews. It went on to debut to $8.3 million, finishing sixth; social media monitor RelishMix said the low figure was blamed on audiences being "bored with this type of cop thriller". In its second weekend the film fell 50% to $4.1 million, finishing eighth.

=== Critical response ===
On the review aggregator website Rotten Tomatoes, 49% of 95 critics' reviews are positive, with an average rating of 5.3/10. The website's consensus reads: "Black and Blue is elevated by Naomie Harris' central performance, even if the end result suffers from a simplistic treatment of topical themes." Metacritic, which uses a weighted average, assigned the film a score of 54 out of 100, based on 23 critics, indicating "mixed or average" reviews. Audiences polled by CinemaScore gave the film a grade of "A−" on an A+ to F scale, while those surveyed at PostTrak gave it an overall positive score of 80%, including an average 4 out of 5 stars.

Candice Frederick of TheWrap wrote, "Black and Blue is chock-full of heart-pounding car chases and suspenseful moments that are certain to entertain mainstream audiences, but the film falters when it attempts, beyond its title, to reflect a necessary and under-discussed conversation about societal issues."

== See also ==
- 21 Bridges
- List of black films of the 2010s
