= Jordan Woolley =

American actor

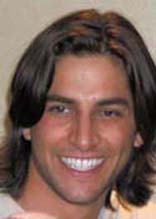
Jordan Woolley in 2006

Jordan Woolley is an American actor who as appeared on television and film, including on As the World Turns. Woolley attended the Lee Strasberg Theatre Institute in New York. Prior to acting, Woolley spent two years as a business major at Castleton State College in Vermont.

== Life ==
Growing up, Woolley was an active Boy Scout in Troop 145 in West Long Branch. He is the youngest of three children with an older brother and sister in addition to a large extended family. Woolley is a 1999 graduate of Shore Regional High School in West Long Branch.

== Appearances ==
- The Beautiful Life (2009) - Egan Russo
- Breaking Point (2009) - Wayne
- Nite Tales: The Movie (2008) - Tom
- CSI: Miami (episode: Just Murdered) (2007) - Paul Warner
- As the World Turns (2005-2006) - Nick Kasnoff
