= Little Boy Blue (1997 film) =

- Directed by: Antonio Tibaldi
- Written by: Michael Boston
- Starring: Ryan Phillippe; Nastassja Kinski; John Savage; Tyrin Turner; Jenny Lewis; Shirley Knight
- Music by: Stewart Copeland
- Production company: Jazz Pictures Inc.
- Release date: June 1997
- Running time: 105 minutes
- Country: United States
- Language: English

Little Boy Blue is a 1997 independent drama film directed by Antonio Tibaldi. The film stars Ryan Phillippe as Jimmy West, a teenager caught in the abusive control of his father, Ray West (John Savage), a Vietnam War veteran. Set in rural Texas, the story explores themes of family dysfunction, abuse, and abduction, culminating in revelations about Jimmy's past and violent confrontations within the family. The film premiered at the Italian festival Mystfest in June 1997 and was later shown in the United States at the Hamptons International Film Festival in October 1997.

== Plot ==
In the isolated backwoods of Texas lives the deeply dysfunctional West family: Ray, a psychotic Vietnam War veteran; his compliant wife, Kate; and their 19-year-old son, Jimmy, who is confined to a warehouse separate from the main house. Outwardly, Ray and Kate appear to run a normal bar and raise their two sons, but behind closed doors, Ray is violently abusive. He exerts a shocking control over Jimmy, even pressuring him into a disturbing sexual relationship and taunting him with the nickname "Little Boy Blue."

Jimmy's life is further complicated when he talks with his girlfriend, Traci Connor, about his future. Offered a full college scholarship, he declines, feeling responsible for protecting his younger brothers from their father's wrath. Although Traci understands his sense of duty, their conflicting priorities ultimately lead to the end of their relationship.

As the story unfolds, Ray's dark past begins to surface. When a stranger visits the bar seeking friendship, Ray grows suspicious and ends up killing a man who appears to be a private detective. Jimmy grows increasingly wary of his father's potential for murder. One night, he urges Kate to take the boys and leave Ray, but she refuses out of fear, unable to imagine surviving in the remote, threatening environment. Tensions rise when Ray discovers Kate comforting Jimmy in the warehouse, demanding that they reveal the truth to him, though Kate manages to calm him.

The following morning, Jimmy visits Traci to say goodbye, revealing the full extent of Ray's abusive and controlling behavior. He explains that he cannot abandon his brothers to Ray's violent tendencies. On his return, he encounters Ray, who confronts him and instigates a violent struggle, one Ray has anticipated for some time. Afterward, Jimmy disappears, leaving the town and his family's fate uncertain.

Meanwhile, a mysterious woman, Doris Knight, arrives in town searching for her missing private detective. Her investigation uncovers a horrifying secret: nineteen years earlier, she had met Ray when he accepted a ride from her family. After complimenting their baby boy and engaging in friendly conversation, Ray brutally attacked her husband, abducted their son, and left her for dead. The traumatic memory resurfaces as she recounts the story to the police, revealing the connection to Jimmy and the "Little Boy Blue" book.

Determined to confront Ray, Doris slips past police supervision and arrives at the West home. With the boys at the lake and Kate searching the warehouse for Jimmy, Doris finds Ray and shoots him, then enters the warehouse where Kate hides. Overcome by grief upon seeing the "Little Boy Blue" book, she kills Kate without remorse. The boys, emerging from their hiding place, are intercepted by a police officer. Doris attempts to shoot him but is killed by police fire.

The aftermath exposes the full extent of Ray's crimes. The police discover a hidden chamber beneath the family's minivan, where Jimmy is found unconscious, tied to a wooden structure and severely beaten. As he is rescued and loaded into an ambulance, Jimmy envisions a hopeful future: married to Traci, raising children, and serving as a policeman. Gradually waking from his vision, he reassures his sons that he will never abandon them. The story concludes with the ambulance driving away, signaling Jimmy's survival and the promise of a safer life ahead.

== Cast ==
- Ryan Phillippe as Jimmy "Little Boy Blue" West
- John Savage as Ray West
- Nastassja Kinski as Kate West
- Adam Burke as Mikey West
- Devon Michael as Mark West
- Jenny Lewis as Traci Connor
- Shirley Knight as Doris Knight
- Tyrin Turner as Nate Carr
- Gail Cronauer as Motel Clerk

== Release ==
Little Boy Blue premiered at the Italian film festival Mystfest in June 1997. In the United States, the film was first shown at Hamptons International Film Festival in October 1997.

=== DVD release ===
- Studio: Lions Gate Home Ent. DVD
- Release date: July 11, 2006
- Run time: 99 minutes

The DVD release of the film contains no extra features, and is only available in a fullscreen format. There are no plans to re-release the film on DVD/Blu-ray in widescreen format.
