= Traffik (film) =

2018 American horror-thriller film

- Theatrical release poster
- Directed by: Deon Taylor
- Written by: Deon Taylor
- Produced by: Roxanne Avent; Paula Patton; Deon Taylor
- Starring: Paula Patton; Omar Epps; Laz Alonso; Roselyn Sánchez; Dawn Olivieri; Luke Goss; Missi Pyle; William Fichtner
- Cinematography: Dante Spinotti
- Edited by: Melissa Kent
- Music by: Geoff Zanelli
- Production companies: Summit Entertainment; Codeblack Films; Hidden Empire Film Group
- Distributed by: Lionsgate
- Release date: April 20, 2018 (United States)
- Running time: 96 minutes
- Country: United States
- Language: English
- Budget: $4 million
- Box office: $9.5 million

Traffik is a 2018 American horror-thriller film directed and written by Deon Taylor and starring Paula Patton, Omar Epps, Laz Alonso, Roselyn Sanchez, Luke Goss, William Fichtner, and Missi Pyle. It follows a group of friends who are terrorized by a gang of bikers in a remote countryside home. It was released on April 20, 2018, by Summit Entertainment, received generally unfavorable reviews from critics and grossed $9 million worldwide.

== Plot ==
On their way to a secluded house in the mountains for a weekend getaway, young couple Brea and John stop at a gas station. In the restroom, Brea encounters a dishevelled, scared-looking woman named Cara who nonsensically mentions the Fourth of July before being ordered to hurry up by an angry biker. Meanwhile, more bikers begin harassing John outside, who responds by hitting one of them. The biker pulls out a knife but the scuffle is stopped by Sheriff Marnes who warns the group to stay away. Their leader, Red, later berates them for drawing attention to themselves.

The couple arrive at the house and spend a romantic evening together, which is interrupted by their friends, Darren and Malia, who arrive unannounced. Brea discovers a phone in her bag and realises Cara must have put it in there. Remembering her Fourth of July comment, Brea figures out the passcode and unlocks the phone; they discover hundreds of photographs of battered women posing for ads, indicating they are all part of a trafficking ring.

Following an argument about what to do with the phone, Malia becomes upset and leaves. Suddenly, Cara arrives at the house and asks for the phone back. Brea reveals she has seen the photos and offers her help, but Cara becomes angry and flees. Brea, John and Darren attempt to follow her, only to find Red and the bikers outside. When Cara tells Red she was unable to get the phone, Red shoots her dead. The three run back inside the house and Darren demands that they give the phone back, meanwhile John calls the police. Darren pulls a gun on Brea and John and takes the phone. Outside he finds Malia's bag and realises they have taken her. Darren attempts to make a deal with Red, but the bikers kill him.

Brea and John run to a nearby house but are chased by two members of the gang who kill the owner of the house and then attack the couple. During the struggle, John is shot while struggling with the biker and succumbs to his wounds. Brea manages to kill the biker before fleeing. Outside in the woods, Brea is captured by Red. Sheriff Marnes arrives with a deputy who are responding to a phone call John made earlier. Marnes shoots the deputy dead, revealing herself to be part of the trafficking scheme, then sedates Brea.

Brea wakes in a hidden location with many other trafficked women, including Malia. Red begins to sexually assault Brea before she sticks a nail in his neck and bludgeons him to death. The last biker attacks Brea but Malia overdoses him with the sedative. As Brea leaves to get help, she promises Malia she will come back for her. Leaving the woods, Brea finds herself back at the gas station. She asks the clerk to call the police. Brea also swipes a cell phone and calls her boss Carl for help.

Marnes arrives and attempts to arrest Brea for the murders. Brea asks if Marnes takes any pride in trafficking women for profit, to which Marnes responds that everything is trafficked and she is just part of the system. Marnes cuffs Brea, only for a squad of cops to show up (called by Carl). Marnes is arrested, and the police rescue the trafficked women.

== Cast ==
- Paula Patton as Brea
- Omar Epps as John
- Laz Alonso as Darren Cole
- Roselyn Sanchez as Malia
- Dawn Olivieri as Cara
- Luke Goss as Red, the leader of the bikers and the human trafficking ring
- Missi Pyle as Sheriff Sally Marnes
- William Fichtner as Carl Waynewright

== Release ==
Lionsgate acquired the rights to the film for $5 million in September 2017. Traffik was theatrically released on April 20, 2018, by Lionsgate's Summit Entertainment. It was originally slated for April 27, 2018, but was moved up a week to avoid competition from Avengers: Infinity War.

== Reception ==
=== Box office ===
In the United States and Canada, Traffik was released alongside I Feel Pretty and Super Troopers 2, and was projected to gross $3–4 million from 1,046 theaters in its opening weekend. The film made $225,000 from Thursday night previews and $1.4 million on its first day, including previews. It went on to debut to $3.9 million, finishing 9th at the box office. In its second weekend the film dropped 58% to $1.7 million, finishing 10th.

=== Critical response ===
On review aggregator website Rotten Tomatoes, the film holds an approval rating of 29% based on 31 reviews, and an average rating of 3.9/10. The website's critical consensus reads, "Traffik highlights Paula Patton's impressive dramatic chops — and smothers them in a thoroughly underwhelming exploitation thriller." On Metacritic, the film has a weighted average score of 37 out of 100, based on 10 critics, indicating "generally unfavorable reviews".
