= Truth Be Told (2015 TV series) =

American sitcom

- Also known as: People Are Talking
- Genre: Sitcom
- Created by: D. J. Nash
- Starring: Mark-Paul Gosselaar; Tone Bell; Vanessa Lachey; Bresha Webb
- Opening theme: "Best Days" performed by Eric Hutchinson
- Composer: Mateo Messina
- Country of origin: United States
- Original language: English
- No. of seasons: 1
- No. of episodes: 10

Production
- Executive producers: D. J. Nash; Will Packer; Pamela Fryman; Korin D. Huggins
- Cinematography: Christian LaFountaine
- Editor: Sue Frederman
- Camera setup: Multi-camera
- Running time: 22 minutes
- Production companies: Next Thing You Know Productions; Will Packer Productions; Universal Television

Original release
- Network: NBC
- Release: October 16 – December 25, 2015

Truth Be Told, known during production as People Are Talking, is an American sitcom television series created by D. J. Nash and executive produced by D. J. Nash and Will Packer for Universal Television. The series aired on NBC from October 16 until December 25, 2015. On December 24, 2015, Truth Be Told was cancelled after one season.

== Synopsis ==
The series revolves around two diverse couples, who are best friends and neighbors. They share their observations about the world around them. The show centers around Mitch, a college ethics professor who is determined to change the part of the world he lives in today. Alongside Mitch is his wife of five years, Tracy, who is also an attorney and loving mom to their five-year-old daughter, Sadie. Right next door is Mitch's best friend, Russell, a stand-up comedian and often Mitch's voice of reason, and Russell's new wife Angie, a doctor, who always keeps him in check. The show is loosely based on the life of creator and executive producer D. J. Nash.

== Cast and characters ==
Main cast

- Mark-Paul Gosselaar as Mitch
- Tone Bell as Russell
- Vanessa Lachey as Tracy
- Bresha Webb as Angie

Recurring cast

- Nelson Franklin as Avi Goldman (episodes 1 & 3)
- Alex Jayne Go as Sadie (episodes 1, 2, 5)
- Sophie Mackenzie Nack as Sadie (episodes (3, 4, 6–10)
- Melanie Paxson as Linda, Tracy's assistant at work

== Production ==
The pilot was picked up to series by NBC on May 7, 2015. On July 27, 2015, NBC changed the title of the series from People are Talking to Truth Be Told. NBC reduced the season order from 13 episodes to 10 episodes on October 27, 2015.

== Reception ==
The show received generally negative reviews from critics. On Metacritic, it holds a score of 26/100 based on 20 reviews indicating "generally unfavorable reviews". On Rotten Tomatoes, it has a 15% approval rating based on 34 reviews, with an average rating of 3.33/10. The website's critics' consensus reads: "Truth Be Told wants to be topically edgy, but only sends viewers on a bland descent into a world of unfunny and grating sitcom characters."

== Episodes ==
No.	Title	Directed by	Written by	Original release date	Prod. code	US viewers (millions)
1	"Pilot"	Pamela Fryman	D. J. Nash	October 16, 2015	101	2.58
Angie scores four tickets to the Jay-Z concert, but Russell is suspicious after learning they were a gift from her ex-boyfriend. Mitch and Tracy are invited to the concert and are excited about going out, something they rarely do since their daughter Sadie was born, but first they must find a babysitter. They finally find a young woman who appears to be suitable, but Russell tells Mitch he thinks he saw the woman in a pornographic video.
2	"Adult Content"	Pamela Fryman	Joshua Corey & Brian Kratz	October 23, 2015	105	2.24
Russell has tickets to the Adult Film Awards, and invites Mitch and two other friends. After saying they need a cover story concerning their whereabouts that they can tell the wives, Mitch insists they can tell the truth, and on a larger scale brags about the trust he and Tracy have in their marriage. Russell tells Angie the event will be good publicity for his Twitter feed, while Tracy just tells Mitch to enjoy the "freak show". Later, Angie gets mad when one of Russell's Tweets is from a female fan displaying her bare chest, while Tracy also has second thoughts. Tracy calls Mitch to express her concerns, making the guys question Mitch's honesty-first policy.
3	"Big Black Coffee"	Ted Wass	D. J. Nash	October 30, 2015	104	2.20
While Sadie is on a playdate with neighbor girl Maya, Maya walks in on Russell taking a shower. The gang isn't sure if Maya saw anything, and they out-vote Mitch who wants to tell Maya's father (Nelson Franklin) the truth. Their decision is made for them when Maya draws a picture of an anatomically-correct man, and Maya's parents fire their male babysitter, blaming him. This causes issues for Tracy, as she had not only made arrangements with Maya's parents to share the babysitter, but also hired him as the entertainment for Sadie's sixth birthday party.
4	"Psychic Chicken"	Pamela Fryman	Aaron Shure	November 6, 2015	103	2.14
When Sadie's favorite chicken at the preschool dies and she questions where it went, the adults are forced to confront their own varied beliefs about God and religion. The matter becomes more complicated when Mitch's baby sister Sam (Ashley Tisdale) introduces her boyfriend who works as a psychic, and Tracy decides to schedule a session with him.
5	"Members Only"	Pamela Fryman	Brenda Hsueh	November 13, 2015	102	2.06
With Russell and Angie needing a new car, Mitch proclaims he can get them the best deal, but things take a turn when the gay salesperson at the dealership assumes Mitch and Russell are a homosexual couple. Meanwhile, Tracy convinces Angie she can get away with sharing a fellow African-American's gym membership ID, due to the inability of the white attendants to tell black people apart.
6	"Guess Who's Coming to Decorate"	Pamela Fryman	Carla Banks Waddles	November 20, 2015	108	2.11
When Angie gets concerned that Russell has had sex with several women in their house prior to their marriage, she wants to "de-skankify" the place by redecorating. Little does she know that the decorator she hires, Katherine (Briga Heelan), is also known as "Kiki", one of Russell's former girlfriends whom he had sex with in the house. Meanwhile, Tracy special-orders a Filipina Barbie for Sadie, but is taken aback when her daughter likes her standard blonde Barbie more.
7	"The Ecosystem"	Michael Shea	Mark Kunerth & Nick Adams	December 4, 2015	107	2.27
Mitch intends to send a lunch invitation to Tracy via text, but accidentally sends it to Angie instead. The two have lunch anyway, and each expresses frustration over being the responsible one in their relationships. Meanwhile, Tracy lets Russell use a cubicle at her office to work on his comedy writing without distractions. This backfires when Russell starts bonding with Tracy's employees, none of whom seem to like her as their boss.
8	"Love Thy Neighbor"	Eric Dean Seaton	Carla Banks Waddles & Robb Chavis	December 11, 2015	109	2.09
Mitch tries to be extra nice to a gay male couple that just moved into the neighborhood, to avoid any possibility of looking like a homophobe. This becomes difficult when the couple's dog barks all night, and one of the two men is just impossible to get along with. Meanwhile, Russell tries to convince Angie that they should get a dog, but Tracy hints to Angie that it might be a prelude to Russell wanting a child.
9	"The Tell-Tale Tacos"	Pamela Fryman	David Regal	December 25, 2015	106	2.00
When Mitch finds out that his friends Russell and Angie weren't seated in a restaurant, he attempts to tell off the supposedly "racist" owner but realizes the restaurant doesn't seat parties unless they are all present. When Russell hugs Mitch and thanks him for yelling at the owner, Mitch can't bring himself to tell Russell the truth. Elsewhere, Sadie is in trouble at school for bullying, and Angie suggests Tracy is also a bully and should treat her assistant, Linda, better.
10	"The Wedding"	Pamela Fryman	Aaron Shure	December 25, 2015	110	1.67
Mutual friends are getting married, and Russell is upset that they pick Mitch to be the minister for the ceremony. Mitch soon learns the bride-to-be has a secret and, despite his overwhelming desire to officiate the wedding, he wonders if these two know each other enough to get hitched. Meanwhile, Angie reflects on her marriage ceremony, when Russell turned it into a stand-up comedy event, and suggests that Russell was overlooked because he tends to make everything about himself. At the end of the episode, Angie tells Russell she is pregnant.
