= Vincent Cirrincione =

American talent manager and producer

- Born: May 31, 1947; Brooklyn, New York City, U.S.
- Occupations: Talent manager Producer
- Years active: 1970s–Present
- Known for: Managing Halle Berry; Taraji P Dorothy Dandridge
- Website: vincent-cirrincione.com

Vincent Cirrincione (born May 31, 1947) is an American talent manager and film producer who has been credited in shaping the careers of actresses Halle Berry and Taraji P. Henson. In 2018, following allegations of misconduct, Vincent closed his management company, Vincent Cirrincione and Associates, and then reopened again in 2020 as Good Shepherd Management.

== Early life ==
Vincent Cirrincione was born in Brooklyn, New York, and grew up in the Marine Park neighborhood under the care of his Italian grandparents. They owned a grocery store.

== Career ==
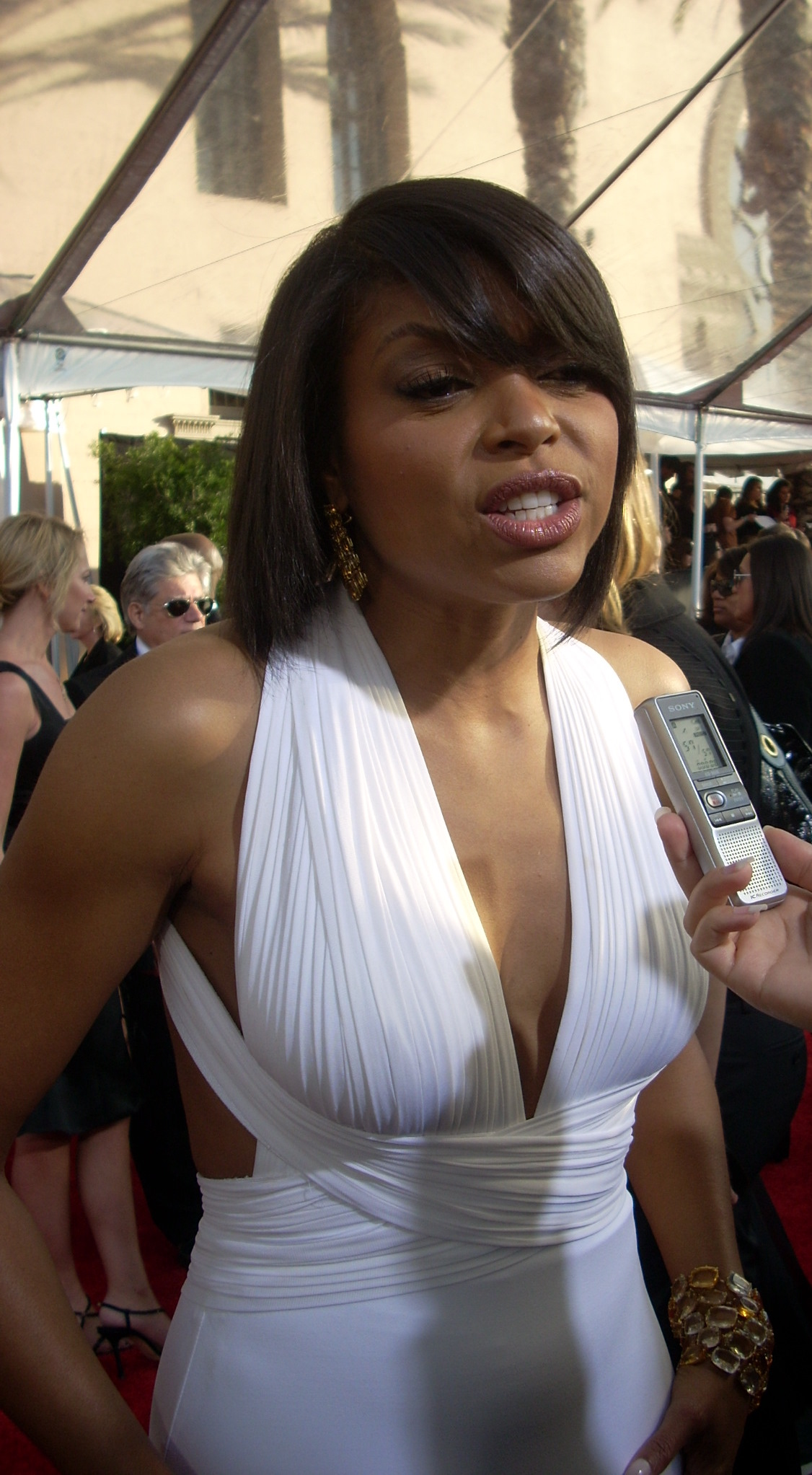
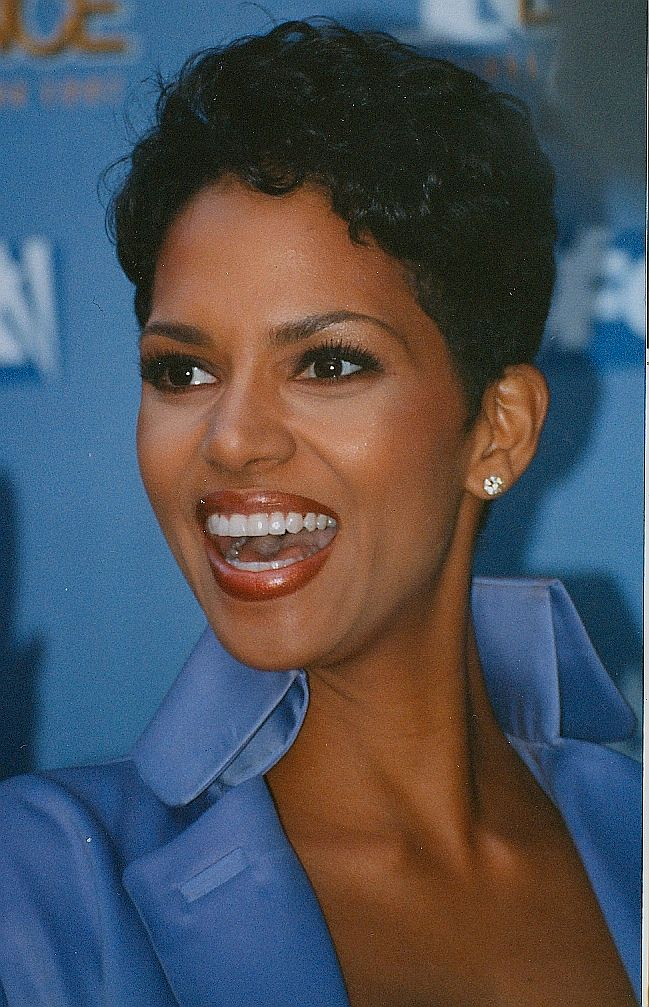
Vincent has managed American actress Taraji P. Henson (left) and Halle Berry (right)

Cirrincione started his career in the music business in New York City, representing jazz guitarist Larry Coryell. He transitioned to the entertainment industry as a talent manager and in the early 1960s, established Vincent Cirrincione Associates in Los Angeles while keeping his base in New York City. He is recognized for discovering and managing the careers of several successful actors, particularly Halle Berry and Taraji P. Henson. Under his mentorship, Berry won an Academy Award, while Henson gained widespread recognition in film and television for her roles in Benjamin Button, Hidden Figures, and Empire.

Cirrincione also ventured into filmmaking, producing projects such as Introducing Dorthy Dandridge (1998), Unthinkable (2010), Supremacy (2014), and Lackawanna Blues (2005). He was nominated for an Emmy for his work on both Introducing Dorothy Dandridge and Lackawanna Blues. He has received honors at the Black Movie Awards, the Christopher Awards and the African Movie Academy Awards. His projects have also garnered nominations for the Golden Globes, Independent Spirit Awards and the Producers Guild of America Awards.

In February 2018, The Washington Post reported that nine women of color accused Vincent of sexual misconduct. The allegations included inappropriate behavior and propositions for sex in exchange for career opportunities.

Cirrincione denied the allegations, which came from women he had declined to represent, stating any encounters were consensual and that he never used his position as a condition for representation.

Halle Berry, who Cirrincione managed for over four decades, spoke of him as a bulldog fighting for her career, and Taraji P. Henson thought of him as a “father figure,“ and felt he “totally respected” her. Neither Berry nor Henson ever accused him of any improper advances.

Cirrincione announced the closure of his management company Vincent Cirrincione Associates in 2018, stating he did not want to create distractions for his clients.

In 2020, Vincent restarted his company as Good Shepherd Management.

== Filmography ==
Year	Title	Producer	Writer	Ref
1999	Introducing Dorothy Dandridge	Yes	No	
2000	The Last Producer	Yes	No	
2010	Frankie & Alice	Yes	No	
2005	Lackawanna Blues	Executive	No	
2010	Unthinkable	Maybe	No	
2014	Supremacy	Yes	No	

== Awards and nominations ==
- 2000 Primetime Emmy Award – Nominated for Outstanding Made for Television Movie
- 2005 Black Movie Award – Winner for Outstanding Television Movie
- 2006 Christopher Award – Winner for Television & Cable
- 2006 Independent Spirit Award – Nominated for Best First Feature
- 2006 PGA Award – Nominated for Outstanding Producer of Long-Form Television
- 2015 Africa Movie Academy Award – Winner for Best Diaspora Feature
