= Deon Taylor =

American film director

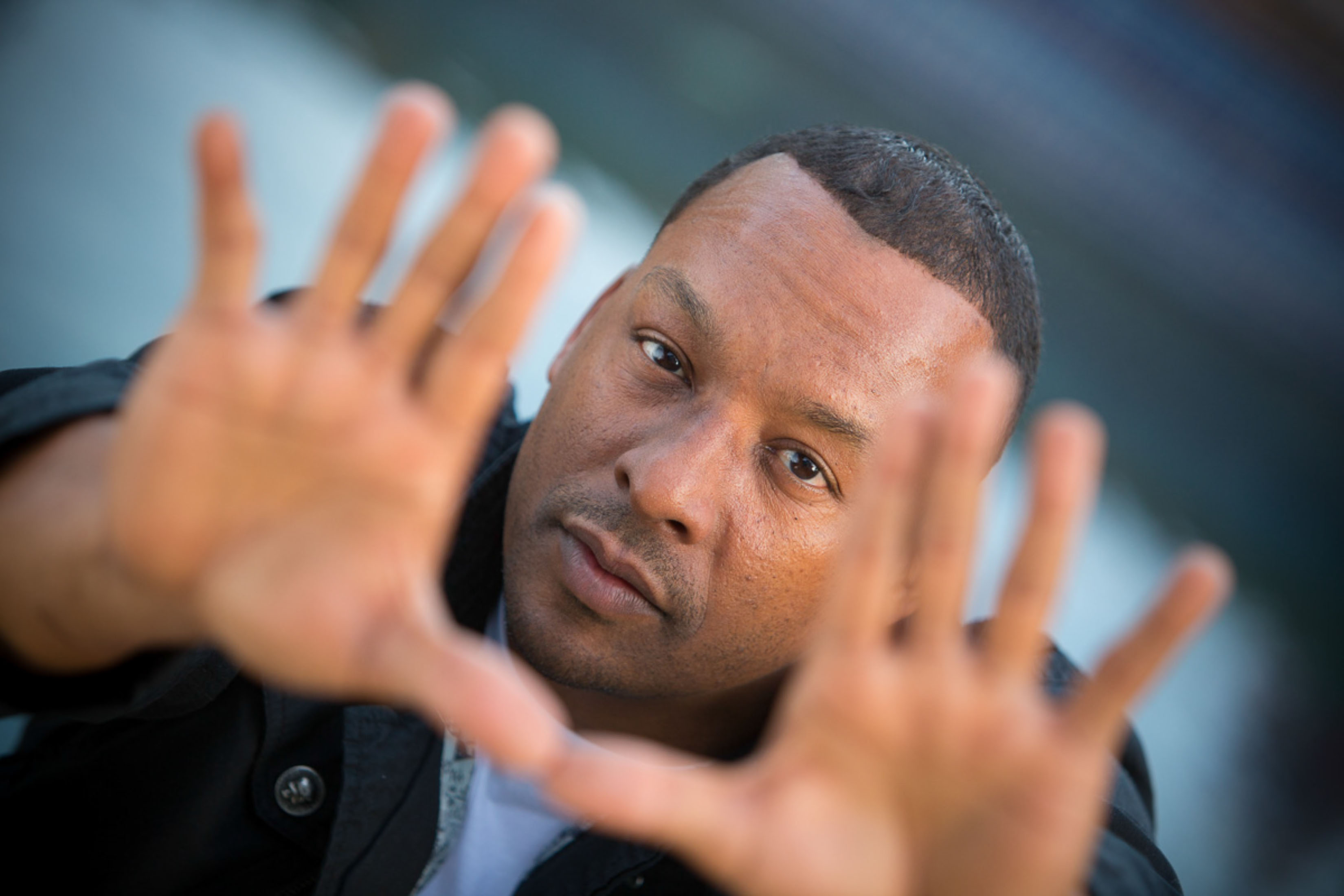
- Taylor in 2016
- Born: Chicago, Illinois, US
- Education: San Diego State University
- Occupations: Film director; film producer; screenwriter
- Years active: 2005–present
- Organization: Hidden Empire Film Group
- Notable work: Dead Tone (2007); Nite Tales (2008); Chain Letter (2010); Supremacy (2014); Meet the Blacks (2016)
- Spouse: Roxanne Avent (m. 2014)

Deon Taylor is an American filmmaker, known for his work in horror and thriller films. He is the founder of Hidden Empire Film Group.

== Life ==
Taylor was born in Chicago and grew up in Gary, Indiana. During high school, he with his brother and mother moved to Sacramento, California. He has stated, “Gary, Indiana is the murder capital of the world, so my entire freshman basketball team is dead." He attended Florin High School. He played basketball professionally, earning a spot in the NBA Entertainment League.

Taylor currently resides in Sacramento, California, filming there and Los Angeles.

== Career ==
Taylor founded Hidden Empire Film Group in Sacramento, California, and wrote and directed his first film, Dead Tone. Taylor went on to shoot a horror series for BET, Nite Tales: The Series, a low-budget series starring Flavor Flav that drew one million viewers on its first airing. Taylor’s slasher thriller Chain Letter was released to select theaters on October 1, 2010.

Nite Tales: The Movie was released on DVD in 2008 with a DVD release of the series pending in the future. Taylor has paired with Jamie Foxx to co-direct a future national television release titled Tommy's Little Girl.

== Filmography ==
=== Films ===
Year	Title
2007	Dead Tone
2008	The Hustle
2008	Nite Tales: The Movie
2010	Chain Letter
2014	Supremacy
2016	Meet the Blacks
2018	Traffik
2019	The Intruder
2019	Black and Blue
2020	Fatale
2021	The House Next Door: Meet the Blacks 2
2023	Fear
TBA	All-Star Weekend

=== Television ===
Year	Title
2009	Nite Tales: The Series
2022–23	Power Book IV: Force
2026	Untitled Master P Project

=== Music videos ===
Year	Title	Artist
2015	"In Love by Now"	Jamie Foxx
