= Gary Owen (comedian) =

American comedian and actor (born 1974)

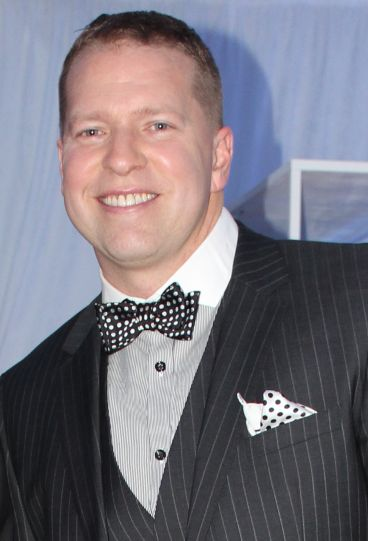
- Owen in 2012
- Born: Gary Stephen Owens; July 26, 1974 (age 52); Cincinnati, Ohio, U.S.
- Occupations: Comedian; actor
- Years active: 1997–present
- Spouses: Kenya Duke (m. 2003; div. 2021) Brianna Johnson (m. 2026)
- Children: 4
- Website: garyowen.live

Gary Stephen Owens (born July 26, 1974), known professionally as Gary Owen, is an American stand-up comedian and actor. He has cultivated a large Black following after headlining on cable channel BET and performing at targeted events, such as Shaquille O'Neal's All-Star Comedy Jam Tour. After being named "Funniest Serviceman in America", his big break came in 1997 on Black Entertainment Television's stand-up showcase Comic View. Owen followed this debut with featured roles in the films Daddy Day Care, Little Man, and College. In 2016, he was in a TV show on BET called The Gary Owen Show.

== Early life ==
Owen was born Gary Stephen Owens in Cincinnati, Ohio, to Barb and Gary Owens. He later dropped the "s" from his surname, adopting the stage name Gary Owen, to avoid confusion with television announcer Gary Owens.

Owen's parents had been high-school sweethearts and his mother was 15 years old at the time of his birth. Owen's parents separated a few years after his birth, and his mother remarried shortly after.

Owen's family struggled financially during his childhood. His mother worked in a factory making electrical connectors, and his stepfather was chronically unemployed. Owen spent the majority of his childhood in a trailer park in Oxford, Ohio, along with his mother, stepfather, stepsister, and three younger half-siblings. He graduated from Talawanda High School in Oxford, Ohio, in 1991.

He joined the U.S. Navy at age 18. He served for six years as a master-at-arms and was in the Presidential Honor Guard.

== Career ==
Owen began doing stand-up in 1995 while stationed with the Navy in San Diego, California. The following year, he started driving to Los Angeles on weekends to perform stand-up in the city. According to Owen, his stand-up was initially not well-received by audiences. In 1996, he was invited to perform at a comedy club in front of a majority Black audience. Recalling the experience in 2015, Owen told Buzzfeed News that when he first performed for a majority Black audience, "I was shocked when I walked onstage and told the exact same fucking joke and it worked. [...] And that was when I knew."

After a year of doing stand-up, Owen was named "Funniest Serviceman in America". He continued doing stand-up in San Diego and developed a large African-American fan base. He went on to win the "Funniest Black Comedian in San Diego" contest. That led to his first gig at The Comedy Store in Hollywood. In July 1997, he auditioned for BET's Comic View. Two appearances on the multicultural comedy showcase won him his own one-hour Grandstand show. At the end of the season, he was selected from the year's four "Grandstanders" to be the host. Owen was the only white man to have ever hosted Comic View.

In April 2011, Ebony dubbed Owen "Black America's Favorite White Comic". Owen has produced two stand-up DVDs: Breakin' Out the Park, which is now available nationwide, and Urban Legend. He was also one of the headliners on Martin Lawrence Presents: 1st Amendment Stand-Up on Starz.

Owen starred in the Screen Gems comedy Think Like a Man — based on Steve Harvey's book Act Like a Lady, Think Like a Man — with Kevin Hart and Gabrielle Union.

Owen has also appeared in such films as Rebound, College, Daddy Day Care and Highway, and had a recurring role on Tyler Perry's TBS show House of Payne as Zack. He appeared in the comedy Meet the Blacks as Larry. He has a TV show on BET called The Gary Owen Show.

He has released the comedy specials Gary Owen: True Story (2012) and Gary Owen: I Agree with Myself (2015), and Gary Owen: I Got My Associate's (2017), all directed by Leslie Small, as well as Gary Owen: #DoinWhatIDo (2019), directed by Brian Volk-Weiss. In 2021, Owen released his comedy special Gary Owen: Black Famous on Showtime cable network that was also directed by Volk-Weiss.

== Personal life ==
Owen met Kenya Duke in 1997. The couple was married from 2003 to 2021 and have two children together, a son and a daughter. Owen was stepfather to Kenya's son from a previous relationship.

Owen became engaged to Brianna Johnson. Following their engagement, Johnson gave birth to their twin sons in July 2023. The couple married on March 7, 2026.

== Filmography ==
=== Film ===
| Year | Title | Role | Notes |
|---|---|---|---|
| 1999 | Held Up | Clute | |
| 2003 | Daddy Day Care | Mr. Carrott | |
| 2003 | Love Chronicles | K-Dog | |
| 2005 | Rebound | Vulture Mascot | |
| 2006 | Little Man | Officer Jankowski | |
| 2006 | Who Made the Potatoe Salad? | Police Officer | |
| 2008 | College | Bearcat | |
| 2012 | Think Like a Man | Bennett | |
| 2012 | Highway | Paw Gatsfield | |
| 2014 | Ride Along | Crazy Cody Tillman | |
| 2014 | Think Like a Man Too | Bennett | |
| 2015 | Get Hard | Himself | |
| 2015 | Bachelors | Stanley | |
| 2016 | Definitely Divorcing | Brian | |
| 2016 | Meet the Blacks | Larry Wilson | |
| 2016 | Restored Me | Ken | |
| 2019 | Undercover Brother 2 | Military Brother | |
| 2020 | Welcome to Sudden Death | Gus | Video |
| 2021 | The House Next Door: Meet the Blacks 2 | Clive Goddard | |
| 2023 | Dotty & Soul | Diggy | |
| 2023 | Back on the Strip | Xander 'Dr. X' | |

=== Television ===
| Year | Title | Role | Notes |
|---|---|---|---|
| 1998 | The Wayans Bros. | Charlie | Episode: "High Life" |
| 2002 | Comic Groove | Himself | Episode: "Episode #1.2" |
| 2005–2009 | 1st Amendment Stand Up | Himself | Recurring Guest |
| 2008 | I Love the New Millennium | Himself | Episode: "2007" |
| 2009 | Comedy.TV | Himself | Episode: "Episode #1.13" |
| 2009 | House of Payne | Zach | Recurring Cast: Season 5 |
| 2011 | Way Black When: Primetime | Himself | Episode: "Episode #1.6" |
| 2013 | Upload with Shaquille O'Neal | Himself/Co-Host | Main Co-Host |
| 2014 | Deal with It | Himself | Episode: "Kendall & Kylie Jenner and Gary Owen" |
| 2014 | Mind of a Man | Himself | Recurring Guest |
| 2016 | Real Husbands of Hollywood | Himself | Episode: "Bazillion Dollar Arm" |
| 2016 | The Gary Owen Show | Himself | Main Cast |
| 2016 | Nubbin & Friends | Chet the Chick | Episode: "The Letter "A"" |
| 2017 | The Real | Himself/Guest Co-Host | Episode: "Episode #3.101" |
| 2017 | Funny You Should Ask | Himself | Episode: "Episode #1.3" |
| 2017 | All Def Comedy | Himself | Episode: "Episode #1.1" |
| 2018 | Wild 'n Out | Himself/Team Captain | Episode: "Gary Owen/21 Savage/CyHi the Prynce" |
| 2018 | Hip Hop Squares | Himself/Panelist | Episode: "Episode #5.3" & "#5.8" |
| 2018 | Martha & Snoop's Potluck Dinner Party | Himself | Episode: "Taj Ma-Holler" |
| 2018 | Ridiculousness | Himself | Episode: "Gary Owen" |
| 2018 | Comedians and Cocktails | Himself | Recurring Guest |
| 2019 | The Wendy Williams Show | Himself/Guest Co-Host | Episode: "Robin Lord Taylor!" |
| 2020 | 25 Words or Less | Himself | Recurring Guest |
| 2021 | The Mediator | Himself | Episode: "Kung Fu Laptop" |
| 2022 | To Tell the Truth | Himself/Panelist | Episode: "Cynthia Erivo, Gary Owen and Donald Faison" |

=== Comedy specials ===
| Year | Title |
|---|---|
| 2008 | Breakin' Out of the Park |
| 2012 | True Story |
| 2012 | Upgraded |
| 2015 | I Agree with Myself |
| 2017 | I Got My Associates |
| 2019 | #DoinWhatIDo |
| 2021 | Black Famous |
| 2024 | Broken Family |
| 2025 | No S |
| 2026 | No Hard Feelings |
