= Frank Stevens (baseball) =

American baseball player

- Pitcher / Outfielder
- Threw: Left

Negro league baseball debut
- 1923, for the Toledo Tigers

Last appearance
- 1931, for the Cuban House of David

Teams
- Toledo Tigers (1923); Chicago American Giants (1925); Birmingham Black Barons (1925); Indianapolis ABCs (1925–1926); Cleveland Hornets (1927); St. Louis Stars (1927); Cleveland Tigers (1928); Bacharach Giants (1929); Cuban House of David (1931)

Frank "Lefty" Stevens was an American pitcher and outfielder who played for several Negro league baseball teams throughout the 1920s and early 1930s.

== Career ==
Stevens began his career with the Toledo Tigers of the Negro National League in 1923. He joined the Chicago American Giants in 1925 as both a pitcher and outfielder. He started the team's first game of the year in a 5-3 win over the Chicago Blues. By 1927, he joined the St. Louis Stars, but he was released before the start of the 1928 season and signed with the Cleveland Tigers.
