= Frank Stephens (Australian footballer) =

Australian rules footballer and coach

Personal information
- Full name: Frank Stephens
- Born: 14 March 1927
- Died: 9 June 1998 (aged 71)
- Original team: St Michaels
- Height: 185 cm (6 ft 1 in)
- Weight: 85 kg (187 lb)

Playing career^{1}
Years	Club	Games (Goals)
1946–47	North Melbourne	14 (16)
1948	South Melbourne	3 (3)
Total		17 (19)
- ^{1} Playing statistics correct to the end of 1948.

Frank Stephens (14 March 1927 – 9 June 1998) was an Australian rules footballer who played with North Melbourne and South Melbourne in the Victorian Football League (VFL).

Stephens played with the Corowa Football Club in the Ovens and Murray Football League in 1949 and 1950.

Stephens was appointed as captain / coach of the Culcairn Football Club in 1951.
