= Frank Stephens (advocate) =

American disability advocate, actor and athlete

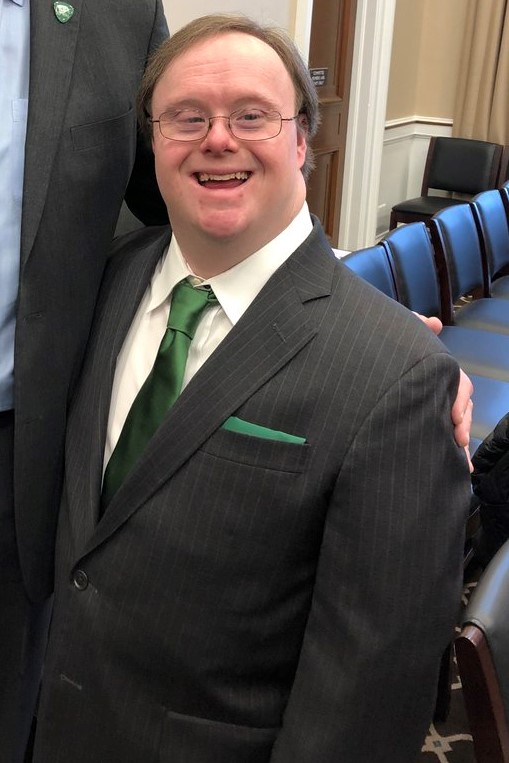
- Stephens in 2019
- Born: John Franklin Stephens; April 9, 1982 (age 44); Fayetteville, Arkansas, U.S.
- Occupations: Down syndrome advocate actor Special Olympics athlete

John Franklin "Frank" Stephens (born April 9, 1982) is an American disability advocate, actor and athlete. He has Down syndrome and has often acted as a spokesman for those with the genetic disorder. He is an ambassador for Global Down Syndrome Foundation and represented the Foundation at the first U.S. congressional hearing for Down syndrome research.

== Early life ==
Stephens was born April 9, 1982, in Fayetteville, Arkansas, to Cornelia and John. He grew up in Fairfax, Virginia.

== Advocacy ==
Stephens has been a public spokesman for those with Down syndrome for many years.

In October 2012, he wrote an open letter to Ann Coulter about her use of slurs against mentally disabled people when referring to then–US President Barack Obama. Coulter refused to apologize, and Stephens spoke publicly to Piers Morgan as a result of the publicity.

In 2016, he received the Quincy Jones Exceptional Advocacy Award from the Global Down Syndrome Foundation, after the Coulter incident and a discussion that year with comedian Gary Owen about an offensive routine.

In September 2017, he joined Global Down Syndrome Foundation to testify before the U.S. Congress on the importance of Down syndrome research and talked about abortion of fetuses with Down syndrome, arguing it is immoral. One of his most famous lines was "If you take one thing away from today, I want you to know that I am a man with Down syndrome and my life is worth living." Stephens received what is believed to be the first and only standing ovation at a congressional briefing and his testimony on C-Span went viral receiving well over 1M views. Today he is also the Ambassador for the Foundation and represents the organizations at many research and medical care conferences and workshops.

== Acting ==
Stephens has acted in multiple plays for ArtStream, a local theater group. He has also had roles in feature-length films including Touched by Grace and Dawn.

== Special Olympics ==
Stephens has competed in the Special Olympics in equestrian events. He is also on the board of Special Olympics Virginia.

== See also ==
- List of people with Down syndrome
