= Tyrin Turner =

American actor

- Occupations: Actor, Producer
- Years active: 1989–present
- Notable work: Fatale (2020); Belly (1998); Menace II Society (1993); Janet Jackson's "Rhythm Nation" (1989)
- Television: Alert (Fox) - Executive Producer

Tyrin Turner is an American actor. He is best known for playing the lead role of Caine Lawson in the critically acclaimed 1993 urban drama Menace II Society.

== Career ==
Turner is best known for playing the main character, Kaydee "Caine" Lawson, in the 1993 film Menace II Society. He also has made guest appearances on television shows such as Chicago Hope and Hangin' with Mr. Cooper and made numerous cameo appearances in urban music videos throughout the 1990s. Turner played the central character in Janet Jackson's 1989 long-form music video for her single "Rhythm Nation".

For over 20 years, Turner has been working behind the scenes writing comedy material for his close friends Jamie Foxx and comedian Affion Crockett. as well as producing the hit Fox show Alert: Missing Persons Unit.

Turner was nominated at the 1993 Independent Spirit Awards for his performance in Menace II Society.

In January 2025, he started a national tour for the off-Broadway stage production of Jason's Lyric: Live!.

== Personal life ==
He is the father to fraternal twins, daughter Tai and son Tyrin Jr.

Turner joined Jamie Foxx and Stephen Jackson when they both spoke out in Minneapolis following the murder of George Floyd.

== Filmography ==
=== Film ===
Year	Title	Role	Notes
1989	Rhythm Nation 1814	Kickdrum	Short
1990	Michael Jordan's Playground	Walt Preston	Short
1992	Deep Cover	Dealer	
1992	Judgement	Titus	
1993	Menace II Society	Caine	
1995	Panther	Cy	
1995	Soldier Boyz	Butts	
1996	The Method	Damian	
1997	Little Boy Blue	Nate Carr	
1998	Belly	Big Head Rico	
2001	Flossin	J.D.	
2001	How High	Shirley Locks	
2003	Crime Partners	Billy	
2008	Nite Tales: The Movie	Dee	
2009	A Day In The Life	Detective Lou	
2010	Ghetto Stories: The Movie	Slimm	
2012	Hillbilly Highway	City Cop #2	
2013	When a Woman's Fed Up	Ray	
2013	...And She Was My Eve	Vic	Short
2014	Supremacy	Reggie	
2015	The Ghetto	3D	
2016	Meet the Blacks	Big Head Rico	
2020	Fatale	Tyrin Abenathy	
2021	Dutch	Sugar Ray	
2021	The House Next Door: Meet the Blacks 2	Big Head Rico	
2022	Hip Hop Family Christmas Wedding	Pastor Williams	TV movie
2024	Dutch II	Sugar Ray	
TBA	All-Star Weekend	Juggs	Completed

=== Television ===
Year	Title	Role	Notes
1990	America's Most Wanted	Charlie Green	Episode: "Sedrick Scott/Calvin Warner"
1992	Jake and the Fatman	Kid	Episode: "Stormy Weather: Part 1"
1993	Hangin' with Mr. Cooper	Lewis	Episode: "The Unteachables"
1995	CBS Schoolbreak Special	Reggie	Episode: "What About Your Friends"
1995	Fallen Angels	Bartender	Episode: "Red Wind"
1995–97	Chicago Hope	Ricky Jackson	Recurring Cast: Season 2, Guest: Season 3
1997	New York Undercover	Clyde	Episode: "No Place Like Hell"
2017	Saints & Sinners	Boomer	Recurring Cast: Season 2
2017	Tales	Little Cop	Episode: "F*ck the Police"
2017	In the Cut	ATM Owner	Episode: "The Hustle"
2017	Black-ish	Big	Episode: "Public Fool"
2020	Sherman's Showcase	Himself	Episode: "Black History Month Spectacular"
2023	Alert: Missing Persons Unit	Mike Sherman Sr.	Episode: "Craig"

=== Music Videos ===
Year	Title	Artist
1989	"Rhythm Nation"	Janet Jackson
1995	"I Never Seen a Man Cry"	Scarface
1996	"Can't Be Wasting My Time"	Mona Lisa
1999	"I Cry"	Ja Rule
2013	"Box Chevy"	Rick Ross

== Discography ==
=== Guest appearances ===
- 1989: "Rhythm Nation 1814" (Janet Jackson)
- 1995: "Lockdown" (D.E.E.P.)
- 1995: "Illusions" (Cypress Hill)
- 1996: "Can't Be Wasting My Time" (Mona Lisa feat. Lost Boyz)
- 1998: "Dawn 2 Dusk" (Geto Boys feat. DMG, & Yukmouth)
- 1998: "Money By The Ton" (C-Bo feat. Mississippi)
- 1998: "Menace Niggas Never Die" (Scarface feat. Menace Clan & Caine)
- 2013: "Tired Of Running" (Snoop Dogg)
- 2015: "Dumb Shit" (Tyrese) feat. Snoop Dogg)
