= Bresha Webb =

American actress (born 1984)

Bresha Webb-Jones
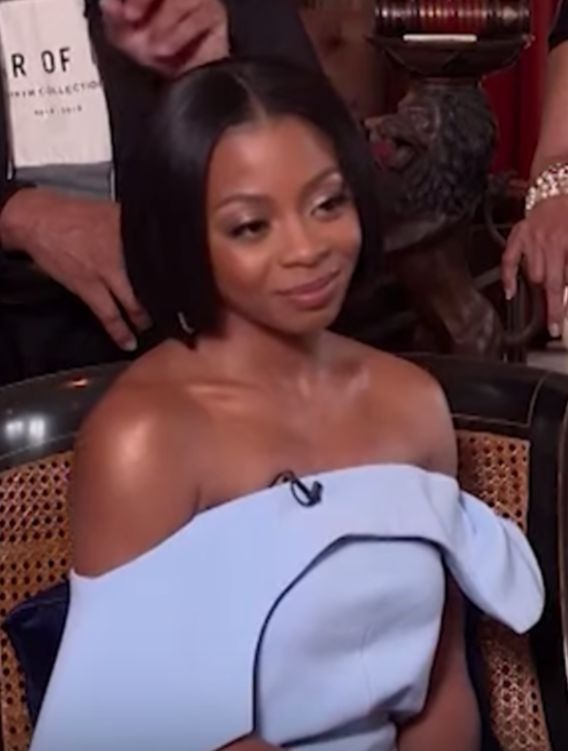
- Webb in 2020
- Born: Bresha Renee Webb; May 6, 1984 (age 42); Baltimore, Maryland, U.S.
- Other name: Bresha Webb-Jones
- Occupations: Actress, singer
- Years active: 2007–present
- Spouse: Nick Jones Jr. (m. 2023)
- Children: 1

Bresha Renee Webb-Jones (born May 6, 1984) is an American actress. She is known for her starring roles as Immunique Jefferson in the TV One comedy series Love That Girl! (2010–14) and as Renee Ross in the Starz comedy series Run the World (2021–23). She has also had significant roles in the films Meet the Blacks (2016) and its 2021 sequel, Sextuplets (2019), and A Fall from Grace (2020).

== Early life ==
Webb was born in Baltimore, Maryland, to Garfield and Shea Webb. In 2002, she graduated high school from Baltimore School for the Arts. She says that her parents have been a strong support system for her and that actors such as Angela Bassett and Will Smith were positive influences for her to pursue acting and comedy. She is a devout Christian. She has stated that she has a strong belief in keeping God first in her life and believes in prayer. In 2007, she graduated from California Institute of the Arts with a BFA in acting.

== Career ==
Webb began her career appearing on television. From 2008 to 2009, she had a recurring role as Dr. Laverne St. John in the NBC medical drama series, ER. In 2010, she was cast opposite Tatyana Ali in the TV One comedy series Love That Girl!. After three seasons of being a part of the main cast of Love That Girl!, it was announced that Webb had been upgraded to the leading role of the television series after former lead actress Tatyana Ali was prevented from returning due to contractual obligations to the now cancelled BET television show, Second Generation Wayans. In 2013, Webb was featured on a special showcase of Saturday Night Live that focused on female comedians of African American descent. In 2014, she starred in the ABC comedy pilot Keep It Together produced by Kevin Hart. Also in 2014, she had a recurring role in the ABC medical drama series Grey's Anatomy playing Teresa Morris.

In 2015, Webb starred in the short-lived NBC sitcom Truth Be Told . From 2017 to 2018, she starred in another NBC sitcom, Marlon, opposite Marlon Wayans and Essence Atkins. The series was canceled after two seasons. In film, Webb starred in the 2014 independent horror Hollows Grove. In 2016, she appeared in the comedy films Ride Along 2 starring Kevin Hart and Meet the Blacks opposite Mike Epps. In 2018, she appeared in the thriller Acrimony starring Taraji P. Henson, and had a supporting role opposite Kevin Hart and Tiffany Haddish in the comedy film Night School. In 2019, she starred with Marlon Wayans in the comedy film Sextuplets. The following year, she starred opposite Crystal R. Fox in the thriller film A Fall from Grace. She was later cast in the Starz comedy series, Run the World.

== Personal life ==
Webb started dating writer Nick Jones Jr. in 2021. They were engaged later that year, and married in Beverly Hills, California on February 4, 2023. She gave birth to her first child in 2024.

== Filmography ==
=== Film ===
Year	Title	Role	Notes
2007	Zombie Love	Teenager	Short
2008	The American Mall	Penny	TV movie
2011	Game Night	Bresha	Short
2012	Heckle or Hell	Mother Bernice Watson	Short
2014	Return to Zero	Dr. Holden's Nurse	
2014	At the Devil's Door	Becky	
2014	Hollows Grove	Julie Mercade	
2014	Keep It Together	Lorraine	TV movie
2015	Ex-Free	Lela	
2016	Ride Along 2	Shayla	
2016	Meet the Blacks	Allie Black	
2016	Ever After High	Justine Dancer (voice)	
2018	A Boy. A Girl. A Dream.	Bresha Webb	
2018	Acrimony	Young Brenda	
2018	Night School	Denise	
2019	Sextuplets	Marie Daniels	
2019	Merry Liddle Christmas	Kiara	TV movie
2020	A Fall from Grace	Jasmine Bryant	
2020	aTypical Wednesday	Bailey	
2020	Merry Liddle Christmas Wedding	Kiara	TV movie
2021	The House Next Door: Meet the Blacks 2	Allie Black	
2021	Merry Liddle Christmas Baby	Kiara	TV movie
2021	Song & Story: Amazing Grace	Tanner	TV movie
2022	Black Karen	Black Karen	Short

=== Television ===
Year	Title	Role	Notes
2007	State of Mind	Lola	Recurring cast
2007	K-Ville	Shania Duplessis	Episode: "Critical Mass"
2007	Lincoln Heights	Eva	Episode: "Out with a Bang"
2008	Dirt	Alicia	Episode: "God Bless the Child"
2008	Raising the Bar	Kea Banks	Episode: "I Will, I'm Will"
2008–09	ER	Dr. Laverne St. John	Recurring cast: Season 14-15
2009	Hung	Lyndie	Episode: "The Pickle Jar"
2010–14	Love That Girl!	Immunique Jefferson	Main cast
2011	For a Green Card	Bridesmaid	Episode: "Go Team Fake Wedding"
2011	In the Flow with Affion Crockett	Tiny	Episode: "Pass the Torch"
2011	Bandwagon: The Series	Urban Glee Performer	Episode: "You Can Do Anything"
2012	Private Practice	Melanie White	Episode: "Are You My Mother?"
2012	Weeds	Charlemagne	Episode: "Threshold"
2013	LearningTown	Cookie	Main cast
2013	King Bachelor's Pad	Hildi	Episode: "Django Unchained Parody"
2014	Grey's Anatomy	Teresa Morris	Recurring cast: Season 10
2015	Truth Be Told	Angie	Main cast
2016	King Bachelor's Pad	Viola	Episode: "Fences Parody"
2017	Legends of Chamberlain Heights	Herself (voice)	Episode: "Legends of Lock Up"
2017–18	Marlon	Yvette	Main cast
2017–19	Star vs. the Forces of Evil	Various Voices	Recurring cast: Season 3–4
2018	Unsolved	Tiffany	Episode: "Christopher"
2019	A Black Lady Sketch Show	Court Reporter	Episode: "Born at Night, But Not Last Night"
2019–20	The Last O.G.	Faith	Recurring cast: Season 3–4
2019–22	Sherman's Showcase	Herself	Recurring cast
2020	blackAF	Jasmine	Episode: "hard to believe, but still because of slavery"
2021–23	Run the World	Renee	Main cast
2021–23	HouseBroken	Nibbles (voice)	Recurring cast
2022–present	The Proud Family: Louder and Prouder	CeCe/College Dijonnay (voice)	Main cast
2023	A Million Little Things	Dr. Jessica Bruno	Recurring cast: Season 5
2025	Hacks	Cece Heaumeaux	Recurring cast: Season 4

=== Video games ===
Year	Title	Role	Notes
2011	Infamous 2	Female Pedestrians (voice)	
2017	Wolfenstein II: The New Colossus	Billie	—N/a

== Accolades ==
Year	Awards	Category	Recipient	Outcome
2021	Women's Image Network Awards	Women's Image Network Award for Outstanding Actress in a Comedy Series	Run the World	Won
2021	Black Reel Awards	Black Reel Award for Outstanding Actress, Comedy Series	Run the World	Nominated
