= Chain Letter (film) =

2010 film by Deon Taylor

- Theatrical release poster
- Directed by: Deon Taylor
- Written by: Diana Erwin; Michael J. Pagan; Deon Taylor
- Produced by: Deon Taylor; Michael J. Pagan
- Starring: Nikki Reed; Keith David; Brad Dourif; Noah Segan; Bai Ling; Betsy Russell; Matt Cohen; Cherilyn Wilson; Michael J. Pagan; Michael Bailey Smith
- Cinematography: Phillip Lee
- Edited by: James Coblentz
- Music by: Vincent Gillioz
- Production company: Deon Taylor Enterprises
- Distributed by: New Films International
- Release date: October 1, 2010
- Running time: 98 minutes
- Country: United States
- Language: English
- Budget: $3 million
- Box office: $1 million

Chain Letter is a 2010 American slasher film directed by Deon Taylor. It was written by Diana Erwin, Michael J. Pagan, and Deon Taylor. The film is about six friends who are stalked by a murderer who uses chains to kill them if they do not pass on the chain letter to five other people.

== Plot ==
The film opens in a garage, with an unconscious teenage girl having her head wrapped in duct tape and her legs chained to the back of two cars. A man and woman walk to the cars and start to drive off, dragging the victim along the ground. The cars are about to take different turns at the end of the driveway when the woman notices the victim, but before she can warn the man, he drives off.

Neil Conners receives an anonymous chain letter via email, telling him that he is the first person who links the chain and he must send it on to five people or else he will die. His sister Rachel (Cherilyn Wilson) forwards the letter but to only four recipients. Neil then adds his sister to the list and sends it, to complete the five.

Rachel's best friend, Jessica "Jessie" Campbell, receives the email and also forwards it to five friends, whilst Johnny Jones also receives it but refuses to send it, believing it to be ridiculous. He goes to the gym where he is knocked unconscious by a black-hooded figure. He is then chained by his arms to a gym set, his ankles are cut across and the chains wrapped round his face, killing him.

While taking a bath, Rachel becomes suspicious of a possible intruder inside the house. She investigates and is attacked by the killer who whips her with a chain several times as she runs through the house to escape. Re-entering the bathroom, she locks the door and looks for a weapon, before placing her face against the door to listen. She realises the killer is on the other side doing exactly the same thing and a few seconds later, he breaks through a side wall into the bathroom and kills her by hitting her on the head with the cistern lid.

Outside the house, Jessie is greeted by Detective Jim Crenshaw, who tells her to forward the chain letter to him. Jessie figures out they are being spied on using a virus embedded in the chain letter so she tells Neil and Michael to get new e-mail addresses and phone numbers, as she believes this will stop the murders. Later on, as more people send Neil the message, he panics and decides to delete all of them. He wants to confront the killer, who turns out to be on the roof of Neil's room, dragging him up onto the roof of the house by a hook attached to a long chain, killing him.

The next day, it is revealed that the teen girl chained to the cars at the beginning of the film is in fact Jessie, who is killed because she sent the chain letter to Detective Crenshaw without sending it to four other people. Michael tries to save her but is too late and when her father pulls out of the driveway, Jessie is ripped apart.

As the film ends, Detective Crenshaw is shown shackled to a table while the killer makes chains nearby.

== Cast ==
- Nikki Reed as Jessie Campbell
- Keith David as Detective Jim Crenshaw
- Brad Dourif as Mr. Smirker
- Betsy Russell as Sergeant Hamill
- Cody Kasch as Neil Conners
- Cherilyn Wilson as Rachel Conners
- Michael J. Pagan as Michael Grant
- Noah Segan as Dante
- David Zahedian as Brad
- Matt Cohen as Johnny Jones
- Patrick St. Esprit as Dean Jones
- Kate Enggren as Debra Jones
- Terrence Evans as Mr. Bradford
- Madison Bauer as Jane Campbell
- Phil Austin as Phillip Campbell
- Brian Tee as Brian Yee
- Charles Fleischer as Frank Wiggins
- Shari Carlson as Judy Connors
- Deborah Geffner as Irene Cristoff
- Bai Ling as Jai Pham
- Jonathan Hernandez as Carlos
- Lyn Ross as Shirley
- Johann Tate as Burt
- Joel Shnowski as Freeman
- Richard Moorhouse as Uncle Bob
- Khatira Rafiqzada as Miss Garrett
- Michael Bailey Smith as Chain Man

== Release ==
Chain Letter went through numerous delays before its official premiere, with several announced release dates that were cancelled.

On November 8, 2009, it was announced that New Films International had bought rights to distribute Chain Letter worldwide, with the intention of developing it into a potential franchise. It was also reported that New Films intended to give the film a theatrical release in the United States the following year. The film was originally set to be released theatrically on May 21, 2010, however, it was later announced that it would only receive a limited theatrical release in six US cities, on August 6, 2010, but the release was once again pushed back. The film would eventually premiere in a limited number of theaters on October 1, 2010.

The film grossed $138,788 in the United States on its opening day, averaging $342 in 406 theaters. It finished its theatrical run on October 7, with $205,842 in the United States and $816,611 internationally, making a worldwide total of $1,022,453.

=== Home media ===
The film was released in both unrated and theatrical cuts on DVD and Blu-ray on February 1, 2011.

== Reception ==
Chain Letter received mostly negative reviews from critics. On the review aggregator website Rotten Tomatoes, the film has an approval rating of 29% based on 14 reviews, with an average rating of 2.1/10.

Mike Hale from The New York Times panned the film stating, "Chain Letter is bad in depressing and irritating ways, from the incoherent story to the unimaginative brutality of the killings to the especially cynical, sequel-baiting ending". Frank Scheck from The Hollywood Reporter called the film "a by-the-numbers example of torture porn". Diego Semerene from Slant Magazine awarded the film one and a half out of a possible four stars, highlighting the film's "hackneyed" anti-technology message, formulaic screenplay, and bland characters. IGN's R.L. Shaffer felt the film "could have been a pretty effective little chiller", but ended up being bland, and failed attempt to cash in on the Scream knock-off trend; with well-executed gore effects undermined by poor pacing, direction, editing, and a plot stocked with one-dimensional characters and cheap scares.

Alternately, some reviewers were more favorable of the film. Heather Wixson of Dread Central awarded the film a score of three and a half out of five. Wixson commended the film for its direction, and special effects, while also noting the unnecessary subplot, and minor technical errors, Dennis Harvey from Variety felt the film's themes on technology felt way too dated, also criticizing the film's "sloppy" screenplay, poor resolution and unmemorable deaths. However, Harvey went on to note that the film's film's slick direction and plot twists worked well enough to ensure that it was reasonably successful.
