= Minkin =

Minkin is a surname that originates from the former Russian Empire. It can be found among people of various religious and ethnic backgrounds. Its origin is not necessarily tied to a single cultural or linguistic root, but rather reflects the diverse population of the Russian Empire, where many different communities coexisted. Notable people with the surname include:

- Bill Minkin, American comedian and singer
- Charlee Minkin (born 1981), American Olympic judoka
- David Minkin, American magician
- Eric Minkin (1950–2025), American-Israeli basketball player
- Helene Minkin, Russian-Jewish anarchist
- Jacob Samuel Minkin, American rabbi
- Vladimir Minkin, Russian chemist
- Yaroslav Minkin, Ukrainian poet and activist
