= World Shut Your Mouth (TV series) =

- Created by: Dom Joly
- Starring: Dom Joly
- Country of origin: United Kingdom
- No. of series: 1
- No. of episodes: 7

Production
- Running time: 30 minutes

Original release
- Network: BBC One
- Release: 7 January – 18 February 2005

World Shut Your Mouth is a hidden camera television series starring Dom Joly. It ran on Friday nights in 2005 on BBC One.

Dom Joly made his name on the similar series Trigger Happy TV on Channel 4, and it was from its great success that he was hired by the BBC to produce new programming. His first effort was an unsuccessful spoof chat show named This Is Dom Joly. The lack of success in conventional comedy prompted him to go back to his hidden camera roots and started to create a new series which was very similar to Trigger Happy TV, with short stunts overlaid with a soundtrack. He was the main participant in these stunts. As with his previous work, the programme had an emphasis on surrealism, with sketches such as a spying gnome and nerds taunting skateboarders.

Where Trigger Happy TV took place in various places around the United Kingdom, the larger budget of World Shut Your Mouth allowed for international travel and filming, and many of the stunts took place at, or near, major international landmarks. There were subtle changes in directorial style, with zooms and close-up shots of the public's reaction to the various pranks. The team working on World Shut Your Mouth was also larger. Trigger Happy TV was mainly the work of Joly and Sam Cadman, with Joly doing the stunts and Cadman filming. In World Shut Your Mouth, Dom Joly did the stunts, and produced the show with Richard Webb. Janet Knipe directed and Al Campbell filmed. The show also starred Danny Wallace in minor supporting roles for some of the stunts, and he also helped develop some ideas for the show.

In January 2005 World Shut Your Mouth began to be shown at 10.35 Friday night on BBC One. Despite its critical success it only ran for one series, which was later released on BBC DVD on 9 May 2005. The DVD featured an entire extra episode that never aired, plus audio commentary on all the episodes.

The series was named after the 1987 Julian Cope hit "World Shut Your Mouth" (and Cope's 1984 album of the same name), which was the show's theme tune.
