= This Is Dom Joly =

- Presented by: Dom Joly
- Country of origin: United Kingdom
- Original language: English
- No. of series: 2
- No. of episodes: 14

Production
- Running time: 30 minutes

Original release
- Network: BBC Three
- Release: 9 February – 15 July 2003

This is Dom Joly is a spoof chat show presented by Dom Joly, originally shown on BBC Three in 2003. It featured interviews, live bands (complete with animals dancing around the band), "video diary" sketches, and the chance for a guest to describe an activity "in a nutshell".

It followed the global success of Trigger Happy TV for Channel 4 with Joly's move to the BBC. It did not meet the success of his previous project, though reviewers had some praise. In a review from The Standard, Lydia Slater writes, "One of the funniest sketches on This Is Dom Joly is a mockumentary, in which Joly introduces us to his monstrous relations: a bored Bosnian wife, a psychotic servant and a gaga, kleptomaniac father.'"

== Transmissions ==
Series	Episodes	Originally released	
Series	Episodes	First released	Last released
1	6	9 February 2003	16 March 2003
2	8	27 May 2003	15 July 2003
