= Prince Charles Cinema =

Cinema in London, England

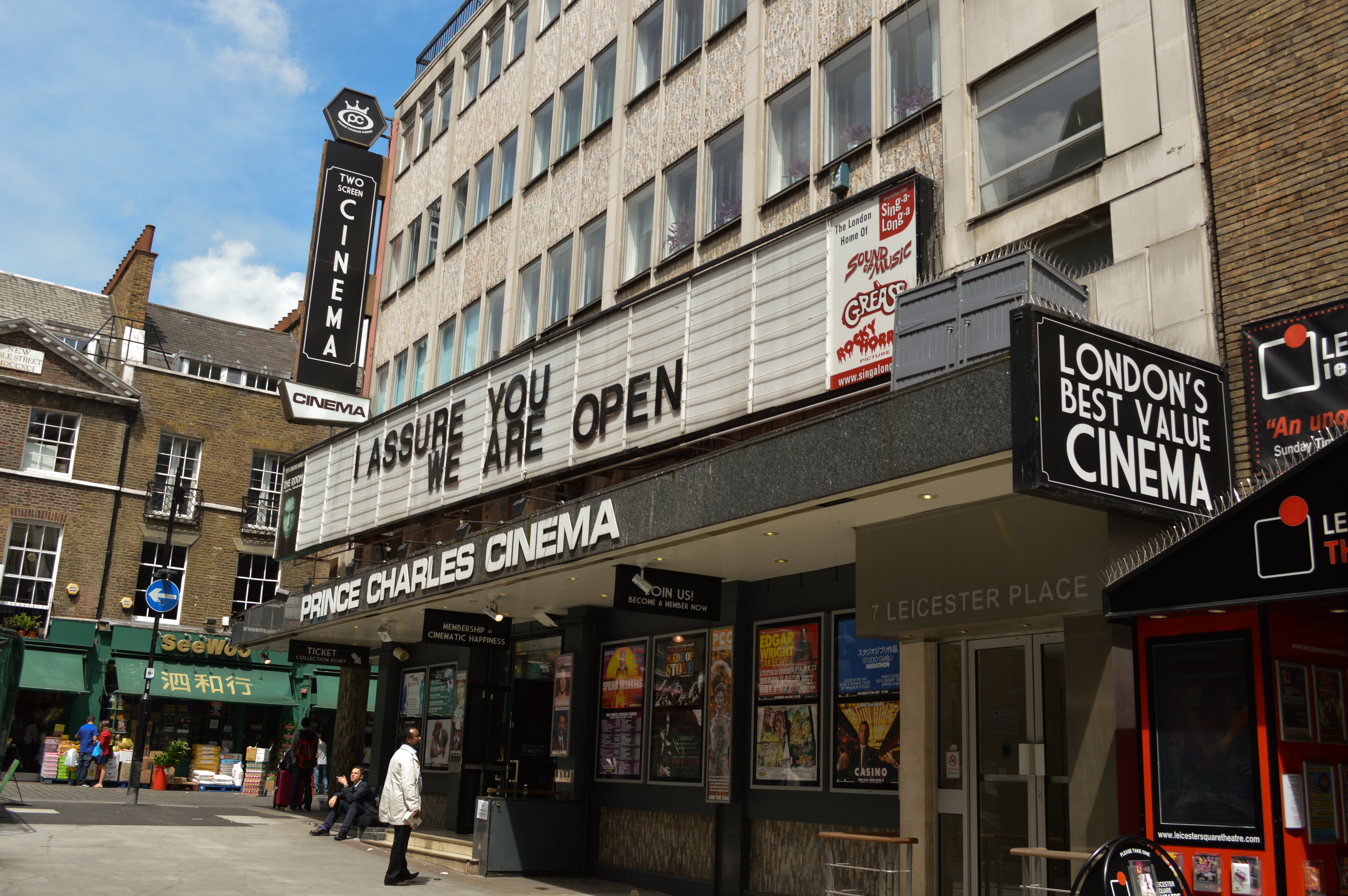
- Cinema frontage in 2013
- Interactive map of Prince Charles Cinema
- Former names: The Prince Charles Theatre
- Location: 7 Leicester Place; London, WC2; United Kingdom
- Coordinates: 51°30′41.2″N 0°7′48.5″W
- Capacity: 300 (downstairs), 104 (upstairs)
- Type: Indoor cinema

Construction
- Built: 1961-1962
- Opened: 26 December 1962
- Architect: Richard Costain LTD

Website
- princecharlescinema.com

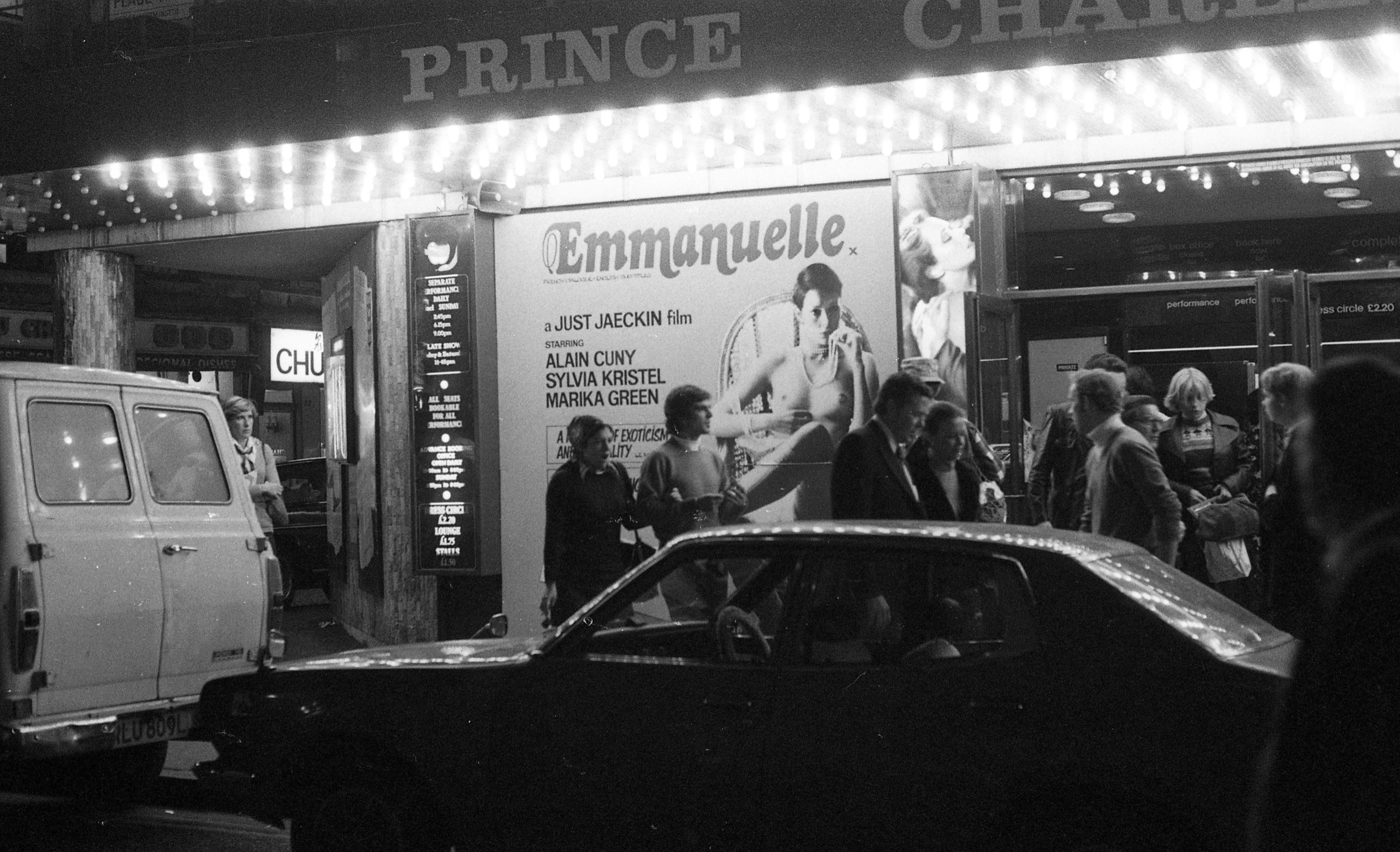
Emmanuelle poster on the front of the building in 1976

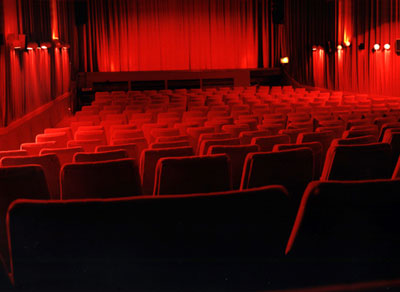
The downstairs screen's auditorium

The Prince Charles Cinema (PCC) is a repertory cinema located near Leicester Square in London, England. Opened in 1962, it shows a rotating programme of cult, arthouse, and classic films alongside recent Hollywood releases – typically more than fifty different films a week on two screens (300 velvet seats downstairs and 104 high back leather seats upstairs). It also regularly hosts a sing-a-long version of The Sound of Music, as well as The Rocky Horror Picture Show and The Room. The cinema has achieved a cult status amongst fans, and is the only independent cinema in the City of Westminster.

== History ==
=== 20th century ===
Constructed between 1961 and 1962, the building was built by Richard Costain Limited for Alfred Esdaile and designed by Carl Fisher and Associates. The building, named after the then-Prince Charles, originally functioned as a theatre with a distinctive 'satellite dish' curve to the floor of the stalls, meaning that audience members are seated at an upwards angle as they face the stage. In 1964 an edition of The Jack Paar Program was filmed there with a performance on the stage by Judy Garland.

After a short period supporting the dramatic arts, the venue was reinvented as a kind of soft porn cinema, and began showing European arthouse movies with "a level of nudity that British and American cinema wasn't ready for". During this period it hosted the UK's longest continuous run of Emmanuelle, as well as Caligula (1979).

The UK premiere of Just a Gigolo was held at the Prince Charles Cinema on 14 February 1979, it was attended by David Bowie who starred in the film.

By the 1980s it also showed horror films, such as The Evil Dead, and in 1987 it hosted the world premiere of Hellraiser.

The Prince Charles was taken over by Robins Cinemas in April 1991, and it was then that it became largely a repertory cinema.

=== 21st century ===
The cinema was used as the setting for a number of stunts in the British sketch show Trigger Happy TV in the early 2000s. Filming was facilitated by the cinema having a balcony at the time from which aerial shots could be taken, which was later converted into a second screen in 2008.

During the UK launch of Kill Bill: Volume 2 (2004), Uma Thurman recorded a special video introduction for a double bill of both movies being held at the cinema. In it she welcomed the audience to "Quentin's favourite UK cinema". Quentin Tarantino has said, "The Prince Charles Cinema is everything an independent movie theatre should be. For lovers of quality films, this is Mecca." and "The day Kill Bill plays the Prince Charles is the day Kill Bill truly comes home." He further described it as London's "queen's jewel" of a grindhouse saying "I was so honoured when Reservoir Dogs hit so big there that they started playing it at midnight and all the lads would show up in the black suits with little squirt guns".

In April 2007, the cinema opened an official Kevin Smith toilet cubicle, after the director held a question and answer session at the cinema. He said "I don't know, Quentin Tarantino has never turned up here and they name the bar after him, it's my second visit and they haven't even named a toilet after me!" The next day they screwed a framed picture of him to the first cubicle in the gents and he officially opened the toilet.

As a commitment to promoting environmental causes, the PCC screened the documentary An Inconvenient Truth every week of 2007. Often the screenings have Q&As with special guests; previous speakers have included Tony Juniper, David Miliband and Sir Menzies Campbell.

The cinema and surrounding area was featured in the music video to "Golden Gaze" by Ian Brown. Peter Doherty, lead singer of The Libertines, worked at the cinema for several months in 1999 before being dismissed.

In Time Out Magazine in 2021, filmmaker Paul Thomas Anderson chose the cinema as his favourite in London, going on to say "'The Prince Charles has a place in my heart. It's the people, the programming, the accessibility, feeling, texture... you cannot go wrong. You also know that on any given day, you can close your eyes, press your finger to the programme and you'll hit something great. It's like tuning into your favourite radio station".

In 2023, after the Coronation of Charles III, the cinema announced that it had no intention of changing its name.

In June 2024, the cinema cancelled a planned world premiere of The Last Screenwriter, a film written by ChatGPT, amid concerns from its patrons about the use of artificial intelligence "in place of a writer".

In the 2020s, screenings of Wong Kar Wai's film In The Mood For Love from 2000 saw an increase in popularity at the cinema.

=== Threat of closure ===
On 28 January 2025, the staff of the PCC launched the #SaveThePCC movement, regarding the PCC's premises' lease. With their current lease expiring in September 2025, the PCC believed that the new lease they had been offered by the building's landlord Zedwell LSQ Ltd was not what they were legally entitled to under Section 26 of the 1954 Landlord and Tenant Act. They stated that Zedwell were demanding to include a break clause into the building's new lease, which would require the PCC to vacate the premises at 6 months notice should Zedwell receive planning permission to redevelop the building, which the PCC interpreted as a "clear intention to do so". Zedwell also want to raise the premises' rent, which the PCC claims would be "at a level which no cinema proprietor would consider reasonable and refusing to supply any information to back this up".

Following the announcement, a petition was set up to Zedwell LSQ Ltd and its parent company Criterion Capital, which reached 10,000 signatures within an hour. By late February, the petition had reached over 160,000 signatures. On 26 February, the PCC said that their negotiations with Zedwell had resumed.

On 9 May, the PCC announced that the cinema had been designated as an Asset of Community Value by Westminster City Council under section 87 of the Localism Act 2011. Regarding the decision, the council wrote that "the Prince Charles is distinguished from other local cinemas by means of its independent ethos, unparalleled programming and a close relationship with the local community".

On 27 August 2026, London Centric interviewed PCC owner Ben Freedman, who said that Criterion had not yet agreed a lease with the cinema, and that both parties would be returning to court in early September for a further pre-trial hearings. "It feels to us that every way possible there is to slow it down and make it more expensive is chosen" noted Freedman.

On 15 October 2026, the PCC announced that they had signed a new 25 year lease with no break clause, securing the cinema's long term future.

== Canopy ==
The canopy above the cinema is used for regular advertising for films, and sports cult film quotes or other obscure messages. Previous messages have cheered on England in the World Cup, proclaimed the cinema to be the ninth wonder of the world, after King Kong, and joked about other local cinemas.
