= Scare Tactics =

American hidden-camera show

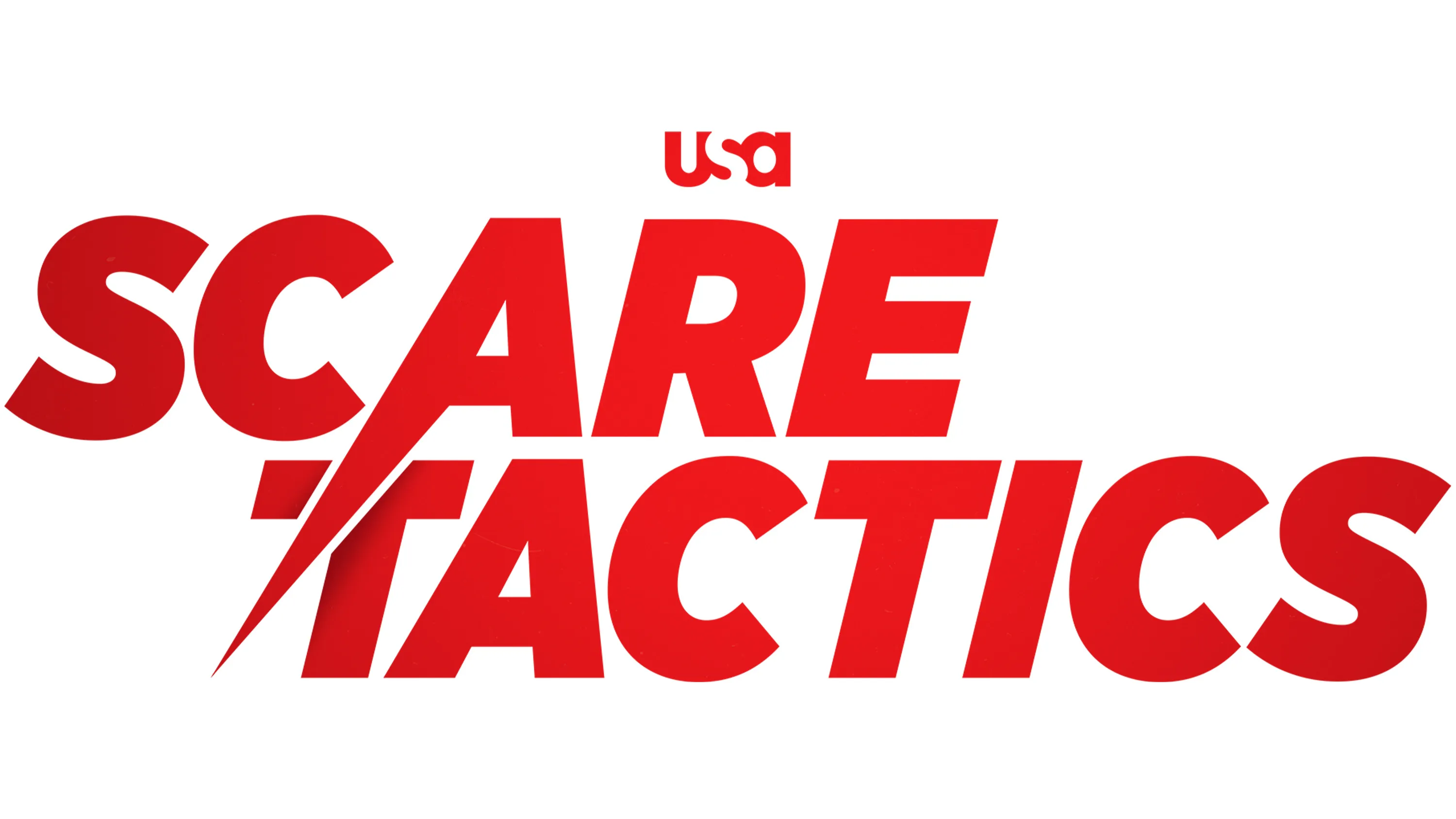
- Created by: Scott Hallock; Kevin Healey
- Presented by: Shannen Doherty (season 1–2); Stephen Baldwin (season 2); Tracy Morgan (season 3–6); Jecobi Swain as Flip (season 7)
- Country of origin: United States
- No. of seasons: Original series: 6; Revived series: 1; Total: 7
- No. of episodes: Original series: 119; Revived series: 10; Total: 129; (list of episodes)

Production
- Executive producers: Scott Hallock; Kevin Healey; Jordan Peele
- Running time: 21 minutes
- Production companies: WMTI Productions, Inc. (2003–2013); Monkeypaw Productions (2024); LikeMineDid Media (2024); Universal Television Alternative (2024)

Original release
- Network: Syfy (2003–2013); Chiller (2012)
- Release: April 4, 2003 – October 28, 2013
- Network: USA Network
- Release: October 4 – December 6, 2024

Scare Tactics is an American comedy horror hidden camera television show created by Scott Hallock and Kevin Healey and aired on Syfy from April 4, 2003, to October 28, 2013. The first season of the show was hosted by Shannen Doherty and then Stephen Baldwin took her place in the middle of the second season. At the beginning of the third season, the show was hosted by Tracy Morgan.

In July 2024, it was announced that USA Network would bring the show back with Jordan Peele as the show's executive producer. The show returned on October 4.

== Format ==
The show's title card from 2010 to 2013.

Scare Tactics is a hidden camera prank show that puts victims into terrifying situations, usually involving movie-style special effects and makeup that recreates horror movie clichés. The victims, generally four per episode, are set up by friends/family in tandem with producers.

Unlike other hidden camera shows, Scare Tactics was shot and edited in a cinematic style intended to give each piece the look and feel of a horror movie.

There are some instances where the victims are lured into the pranks on the promise of being on a fake reality show called "Fear Antics" which plays off like a show similar to MTV's Jackass but end with dire consequences. In "Fear Antics", the victim is led to believe that they are the prankster, when in fact the joke is on them. Sometimes, the victim of "Fear Antics" will attempt keeping calm and rationally try keeping the situation from getting out of control (from their perspective).

The pranks end when the victim is completely terrified and an actor would ask them, "Are you scared?" to which they usually reply in the affirmative. They then get the reply, "You shouldn’t be! You're on Scare Tactics!" or "I'll have to/I'm gonna put you on Scare Tactics!". Alternately, at times when a victim almost ran for their lives, the actors would immediately announce the same thing. Rarely, a victim assaulted an actor playing an antagonist in a moment of courage; forcing the crew to end the charade. There were only two occasions where a victim realized they were on Scare Tactics.

== Guest stars ==
- Matt Hardy (Season 3, Episode 15)
- Judah Friedlander
- Brooke Hogan (Season 5, Episode 1)
- Lauren Ash
- Eric Stonestreet (Season 3, Episode 17)
- Marc Evan Jackson
- Dot-Marie Jones

== Production ==
Its first two seasons aired from April 2003 to December 2004. After a hiatus, the show returned for a third season, which premiered on July 9, 2008. The fourth season premiered on October 4, 2010. On July 17, 2017, it was announced that Blumhouse Television was going to produce a new season of the show. On July 25, 2024, USA Network announced that it would reboot Scare Tactics with Jordan Peele's Monkeypaw Productions and Universal Television Alternative Studio set to produce.

=== Lawsuit ===
In February 2003, two months before the show premiered, Kara Blanc (a target of a prank on the show) sued Sci-Fi Channel, the producers of the show, one actor (Travis Draft) and the friend who set her up (Mathew Mertha). Her suit claimed emotional damages and that she had to be hospitalized multiple times due to the incident. In November 2004, the parties reached a mutually satisfactory settlement.

== List of Scare Tactics episodes ==
=== Season 1 ===
- 101: UFO Abduction, Firing Range, Buried Alive, Camp Killer
- 102: Bigfoot Attacks, Where's Shannen?, Flatline, Psycho Hitchhiker
- 103: Organ Harvest, Monster in the Closet, Disappearing Stripper, Limo in Area 51
- 104: Clone Attack, Orgy from Hell, Repo Man, Monkey Trouble
- 105: Meteor Man, Date with the Devil, Barbershop of Blood, Taxi Cab Carnage
- 106: Lab Spill, Haunted Babysitter, Serial Killer, Hellride
- 107: Tanning Salon Terror, Cable Killers, Little Girl Psychic, Runaway Corpse
- 108: Ghost Train, Body in Trunk, Dominatrix for a Day, Desert Monster
- 109: UFO Trailer Attack, The Cannibal Family, Séance from Hell, Driving the Dead
- 110: Harsh Reality, Dr. Werewolf, Boy in a Bubble, Virgin Sacrifice
- 111: Chupacabra Attack, Deadly Secret, Lights Out, Black Magic
- 112: Hazmat Hell, Surgery Nightmare, Death Lunch, Bad Seed
- 113: Laboratory Meltdown, Eye Witness, Unborn Clones, Silo Scare
- 114: Deadly Feast, Fear in the Box, Fear Antics: Psycho, Maniac Cop
- 115: Killer Clown, Lethal Conversation, Caught on Camera, Demonic Duel
- 116: Chainsaw Attack, Beastly Breakout, Deadly Hicks, Alien Returns
- 117: Dangerous Obsession, Web of Evil, Laboratory of Blood, Repo from Hell
- 118: Security Breach, Taste for Blood, Zombie Grandma, Killer Car
- 119: Bad Medicine, Killer Queen, Dead Alive, Alien Hunters
- 120: Massacre Under the House, Unholy Ground, Video Victim, Mask of Death
- 121: Lethal Touch, Showgirl's Revenge, Terror Next Door, Bigfoot Returns
- 122: Home Invasion, Demonic Possession, Fatal Beauty, The Hunted
- 123 Special: The Bloody Mirror, Camp Killer, Deadly Infestation, Harsh Reality, Voodoo Resurrection, Psycho Hitchhiker

=== Season 2 ===
- 201 (24): Rage from the Cage, Killer Bees, Bring Out the Gimp, Grave Robbers
- 202 (25): Street Justice, That's Not Santa, Freaks Come Out at Night, Possessed Office
- 203 (26): Gorilla with a Fist, Regression Aggression, Fear Antics: Mandroid's Revenge, Flowers for My Lady
- 204 (27): What's in the Box?, Stakeout, Shocker, Radio Daze
- 205 (28): Brother's Keeper, Cult Compound Crackdown, Revenge of the Switchhiker, Drug Ring Sting
- 206 (29): Toilet Full of Scary, Desert Cult Trailer Attack, Wrath of the Mummy, Juvenile Justice
- 207 (30): Slaughterhouse of Horror, Porn Dorm Massacre, Desert Ritual, Walk-in Portal
- 208 (31): Wired for Revenge, Shave and a Headcut, Summon the Demon, Fear Antics: Hotel Hell
- 209 (32): Motor Psychos, Attack of the Rat Monster, I Me Minefield, There Are Men Coming Here to Kill Me
- 210 (33): Piranhas in the Pond, Chambermaid of Horror, Shotgun Wedding, Critters
- 211 (34): If I Only Had Your Brain, Open the Pod Bay Door, Wired, Fear Antics: Room with a View
- 212 (35): Power Outrage, License to Drive, Wolfman Tells Campfire Stories, The Bagman
- 213 (36): Backwoods Booby Trap, Demon's List, Newest Mental Patient, Mob Morgue
- 214 (37): For Whom the Bridge Trolls, Party Forever (Parts 1 & 2), Burned Alive
- 215 (38): Drone Helicopter, Fed-Execution, Girl in a Blood-Soaked Dress, Dr. Jekyll & Mr. Hyde
- 216 (39): Unsafe, Eye of the Beholder, Tastes Like Chicken, Meet My Psycho Girlfriend
- 217 (40): Bedridden but Deadly, The Set Up (Parts 1 & 2), Lost and Found
- 218 (41): Pond Creature, Carface, Moonshine Mountain, Rubbed the Wrong Way
- 219 (42): Car Wash, Fear Antics: Running Man, Gimme a Hand, Spa of Death
- 220 (43): The Blob, Road Rage, Strip Club, Man of the Haunted House
- 221 (44): Alien House Call, Hackman Attacks, Final Entry, Hannah's Abduction
- 222 (45): Moms Crazy

=== Season 3 ===
- 301 (46): Satan's Baby, Wood Chipper, Psychic, Black Project
- 302 (47): 3:10 to Hell, Patient's Rage, Fire Starter, Affection
- 303 (48): Genie in a Beer Bottle, Vampire Spa, Escaped Mental Patient, Alien Eggs
- 304 (49): Psycho in a Box, Cheaters of Death, Welcome to the Neighborhood, Ice Man
- 305 (50): When White Noise Attacks, Phantom Power, Walled Off, Paralyzed with Fear
- 306 (51): The Screaming Room, Death Bed and Breakfast, Little Person, Big Kill, Welcome to the Dollhouse
- 307 (52): Frankenstein's Basement of Terror, Who's Your Dead Daddy?, Wired for Fear, Pool of Blood
- 308 (53): Taxi Cab Carnage, Alien Consortium, Double Trouble Clone, Junkyard Showdown
- 309 (54): Home Video Horror, Last Will and Testament, Voodoo Vixen, Assassin's Apprentice
- 310 (55): When the Larvae Breaks, To Catch a Predator, Curse of the Samurai, Pickled to Death
- 311 (56): Big Scoop of Scary, Home Invasion, Healer/Killer, Coffin Refill
- 312 (57): Blood Bath, Meteor Virus, Carmageddon, Welcome to the Dollhouse 2
- 313 (58): Satan's Baby Returns, Screaming Room 2, Barbershop of Blood 2, Junkyard Showdown 2
- 314 (59): Basket Case, Human Stew, Web of Lies, Breakdown
- 315 (60): Ghoul Bus, Criminal's Rage, Killer's Hideout, Psycho Kid
- 316 (61): Channeling the Dead, Black Project 2, Zombie Testing, A Quick Bite
- 317 (62): 28 Minutes Later, Nightmare Session, Zig the Clown, Paranormal Radio Show
- 318 (63): Ranger Danger, Mistaken Identity (Parts 1 & 2), The Doctor's Trip
- 319 (64): The Collector, Cleansing the House, Finding the Truth, Psycho Dance
- 320 (65): Toxic Shock, The Pimp, Female Serial Killer, Can I Have a Kiss?
- 321 (66): Tow Truck Killers, Radioactive Tanning, Mental Patient's Drug Overdose, Cannibal Party
- 322 (67): Ghoul Bus 2, Wrong Identity, Nightmare Motel, Criminal's Second Rage
- 323 (68): Dying to Kill!, Big Phantom Power, Re-hatched Alien Eggs, Old Man of Death
- 324 (69): Desert Cult Trailer Attack
- 325 (70): Satan's Baby Returns

=== Best of Scare Tactics season ===
- 901 - 922 (22 total half-hour episodes)

=== Scare Tactics International episodes ===
- 327 - 329 (3 total half-hour episodes)

=== Season 4 ===
- 401 (71): It's My Party, The Squatters, Fear Antics: Check Yourself, Crop Circle Showdown
- 402 (72): No Pain No Brain, Communicating with the Ghosts, The Freak Show, Blood on the Cosmos
- 403 (73): Killing Rosemary's Baby, Human Auction, Look in the Sky, Show and Hell
- 404 (74): Vampire Stakeout, Mind Killer, Wine to Die For, Grandpa Has Returned
- 405 (75): Life's a Witch, Revenge of the Werewolf, Alien Babysitter, Organ Harvesting Facility
- 406 (76): Alien Road Block, Lend Me a Hand, Black OPTS, Murderer Still at Large
- 407 (77): Valet Violence, Cursed Book, Possessed Farm, Demon Doll
- 408 (78): Tracy the Tour Guide, Into the Mist, Horror on the Horror Set, Death from Above
- 409 (79): Uh Oh! It's Maggots, Ultimate Alien Fighter, Fountain of Youth, He Shoots He Spores
- 410 (80): If These Walls Could Bleed, Size Splatters, Zombie Town, Truthisodes
- 411 (81): Chill Out, Reptile Creature Revolt, Gang Green Thumb, Scary Development
- 412 (82): Hot Under the Collar, Insanity Virus, No Asylum, Voo Doo You Love?
- 413 (83): Buzz Kill, Electrocutie, Ouija Sitter, Snakes in a Drain

=== Season 5 ===
- 501 (84): Driver's Dead, 2 Guys 1 Suit, The Brand, Human Doll Party
- 502 (85): Pregnant with a Mutant, Work Your Skin Off, Elite Bodyguard Firm, Alien in a Box
- 503 (86): Blown to Green Pieces, Farm Troll, Welcome to the Psych Ward, Monsterious Waste
- 504 (87): Bicentennialien, Waste of Talent, Human Blood Drive, All Puzzled
- 505 (88): Barnacle Boy, Reviving Your Fate, Deadly Sibling Rivalry, Lost Your Hand
- 506 (89): Touched by an E.T., Human Clothing, Vampire Child, Nightmare Therapy
- 507 (90): The Happening Again, Don't Mess with the Boss, Fried Girl, The Missing Link
- 508 (91): Party 'Til You Nuke, The Enigma, Fear Antics: Hospital, Polterheist
- 509 (92): The Corpse Whisperer, Date from Hell, Carnivorous Flies, Send in the Clowns
- 510 (93): Alien Car Crash, Morgue Woman, El Scareiachi, Coma Killer
- 511 (94): Gnome Sweet Gnome, Fear Antics: Mailbox Killer, Baby Trauma, Secret of Survival
- 512 (95): Fright at the End of the Tunnel, Look Who's Laughing, Wonderful Knife, Conjoin Me for Dinner
- 513 (96): Twilight My Fire, Crystal Myth, Double Cross Dress, Killer Performance

=== Season 6 ===
- 601 (97): Dearly Bedeviled, Death's Table
- 602 (98): Hospital Hell!, Prized Possession, Thrill Ride
- 603 (99): Mutant Theme Park, TBA
- 604 (100): The Cursed Collection, TBA
- 605 (101): Root of All Evil, TBA
- 606 (102): Fear Kitty, Kitty!, TBA
- 607 (103): Selling Sasquatch, TBA
- 608 (104): False Prophet, TBA
- 609 (105): Killer Couture, TBA
- 610 (106): Art of Darkness, TBA

== International broadcast ==
In the United States, the show aired reruns on GSN as part of the "Friday Night Frights" block in October 2016, formerly on MTV2 and streamed on Netflix from 2019 to 2022. In Europe, the first season of the program aired on MTV Central from 2003 to 2004. The show was also broadcast in Australia on Fox8, in Canada on MTV, in India on AXN, in Russia on MTV Russia (only the first two seasons), in Turkey on Dream TV, in Poland on TV Puls, in Finland on Jim, in South Korea on Q TV, in Sweden initially on TV6, and then on TV11. The program was distributed internationally by Rive Gauche Television.

== See also ==
- Infarto: A similar scare/prank show airing on TV Azteca and Azteca América.
- Room 401: A similar scare/prank show airing on MTV.
- Prank Encounters: A similar scare/prank show airing on Netflix. It was also produced by Kevin Healey and included some of the same prank actors. (In March 2020, Prank Encounters (specifically Kevin Healey and Propagate Content) was sued for violating Scare Tactics' Copyright. The suit alleged that several of the stories on Prank Encounters were direct rip-offs of Scare Tactics pranks. The lawsuit was settled to the satisfaction of all parties.
