= Travis Draft =

Travis Draft is an actor and entertainer. He has played over 500 characters on TV. He is most known for appearing on Buzzkill.

== Early life and career ==
Draft started his career at Chicago's The Second City in 1992 as an observer, working behind the scenes while attending film school at Columbia College. After working his way through the ranks at Second City, Draft directed and acted in a gonzo television pilot in 1994 that chronicled the exploits of three young comedians (Draft, Dave Sheridan and Frank Hudetz) traveling the country in a van shooting sketches using the unknowing public as supporting cast members. This was accomplished by the use of a hidden camera attached to eyeglasses, eventually leading to the creation Buzzkill, which aired on the MTV network starting in 1996.

Draft followed up on the short-lived Buzzkill with the NBC series Spy TV, which he wrote, directed, co-produced and acted in. In 2002 he directed Oblivious, a hidden camera game show starring Reagan Burns. When Animal Planet wanted in on the then hot genre, Draft was hired to write and produce a special titled Animal Pranksters.

Draft then moved on to The Sci-Fi Channel's first hidden-camera show, Scare Tactics, where he spent three seasons acting and directing for the series. During that time he was also cast as a regular on Comedy Central's Trigger Happy TV, pranking people all over the United States for the two series.

In the summer of 2003 Draft and Sheridan co-founded Van Stone, a shock rock band that had success placing songs in films, TV shows and on one of the Tony Hawk video games. The band played their debut show on "Jimmy Kimmel Live" and performed in a sketch featuring Jimmy's uncle Frank.

In 2005 he was cast as homeless rocker "Dirty Don" for a VH1 international show called Home James. The script-prov show was aired in Brazil, the UK, Japan, Australia and Israel.

In 2006 Draft wrote, produced, directed and acted in two adult hidden camera shows for Playboy TV; Totally Busted and Canoga Park.

In 2008 Draft briefly returned to work on Scare Tactics, and invented The yacht Rock Tribute band Format with Knights of Monte Carlo plating festival and exclusive Hollywood industry parties.

2110 Travis story produced the A&E reality series The Hasselhoffs,

Draft wrote and directed for the 2012 hidden camera show Betty White's Off Their Rockers. In 2013, he attached cameras to aerial drones, producing and directing two shows for the Esquire Channel for which he also supplied aerial cinematography. That year he appeared on the prank television series Deal With It.

In 2014, Draft wrote and acted on the ABC Family reality prank series Freak Out,

In 2015, he directed the first series for YouTube starring YouTuber Felix "PewDiePie" Kjelberg as well as the first season of the TruTV prank series Fameless, also acting on the series during its 2016 season.

In 2017, Draft co-created a short form sitcom called Block Captain Dan, about a neighborhood watch captain who is more trouble than he is help, which was aired by comedy content provider CHUCKLER on Facebook.
