= Een ster in de familie =

Belgian television programme

Een Ster in de familie (A Star in the Family) is a Flemish TV show that was broadcast on VTM during the spring of 2011. The presentation is in the hands of Johan Terryn. In the show, parents are fooled by their kids and a well known Belgian celebrity. Everything is filmed with hidden cameras.
