= The Fraulein and the Sandman =

- Film poster
- German: Der Sandmann
- Directed by: Peter Luisi
- Release date: 18 January 2011 (Max Ophüls Festival)
- Country: Switzerland
- Language: German

The Fraulein and the Sandman (German: Der Sandmann) is a 2011 romantic comedy in the Swiss German language, by Swiss director Peter Luisi, about a man leaking sand that causes people to dream (similar to the mythological figure the Sandman).

== Plot ==
Benno (Fabian Krüger) lives a relatively quiet life, working as a stamp dealer and living alone, although he frequently visits his girlfriend Patrizia (Florine Elena Deplazes). However, he has one great irritation in life: His apartment lies above a diner owned by a woman called Sandra (Irene Brügger), who frequently keeps Benno awake by practising her one-man-band act for a talent show at night.

One morning, Benno notices that he is losing sand; he cannot explain where it comes from, and tries to ignore it at first, but it increases, and soon he leaves sand almost everywhere he goes. Visits to a doctor do not reveal anything wrong, and a psychiatrist cannot help either, believing “losing sand” to be Benno's metaphor for his life instead of taking it literally. Benno even tries calling Dimitri (Michel Gammenthaler), a television psychic, but is only told to “search within your dreams” and that “the answer is nine”.

Furthermore, it seems that anybody sniffing the sand (including Benno himself) falls asleep. This, and the constant leaking of sand, makes Benno's life more and more problematic, until he realizes that he and Sandra keep dreaming the same dream, but only he is awake and aware that he's dreaming. He asks her for help, and eventually realizes that when he is honest, the sand stops leaking.

Overjoyed, Benno goes out and tries to live a new life in honesty, but it does not work too well: His boss becomes furious when Benno has to admit he's been bringing sand into the office, as well as stealing a famous stamp for himself, and his girlfriend leaves him when he says he does not really love her. Instead, Benno retreats more and more into Sandra's dream, where he is free to do whatever he wants, but in real life, the sand in his apartment is piling up, eventually trapping him. In desperation, he asks Sandra for help in her dream.

Waking up, Sandra indeed rescues him, but is furious that he has been invading her dream. Benno eventually understands the psychic's advice: To be freed of the curse, Sandra must perform the Ode to Joy from Beethoven's 9th symphony, his favorite musical piece, in their shared dream. Reluctantly, she promises to help him, and they practise both in and out of the dream world. However, when the time finally comes to perform the piece with an orchestra (although in an empty hall), Benno realizes he is the director, and the performance degenerates into cacophonia. They wake up, and once again become enemies—but as she leaves, Sandra reveals that her practice was for Benno, as she is in love with him.

Dismayed, Benno calls Dimitri again, now outside his television show hours. Dimitri, however, admits being a fraud, who has been making up his “psychic advice”. Benno, now almost totally disintegrated due to all the sand loss, makes a final visit to Sandra, and although he is not allowed into her apartment, he tells her softly how much he “hates her face” and “wants to be as far away as possible from her”. As Sandra opens the door, she sees that all that's left of Benno is sand, proving he really meant the opposite, and sniffs it to join him in a final attempt to perform the symphony. They enter the stage in a packed concert hall, but Benno has realized that they should not perform the symphony, but rather Tango Plagööri, the piece Sandra rehearsed as part of her one-man-band show. As the performance ends and the crowd applauds heavily, they wake up in each other's arms, with all the sand gone.

== Awards ==
The Sandman won the Audience Prize at the 2011 Max Ophül Film Festival in Saarbrücken, as well as receiving three nominations for 2011 Swiss Film Prize.
