= Peter Luisi =

Film director, producer and screenwriter

- Born: 1975 (age 50–51); Zurich, Switzerland
- Education: University of California (Santa Cruz), bachelor's degree in 1998
- Occupations: director, screenwriter, producer
- Years active: 2002-present
- Notable work: The Fraulein and the Sandman, Bon Schuur Ticino, The Last Screenwriter

Peter Luisi (born 1975) is a Swiss film director, producer and screenwriter. His films include Verflixt verliebt (2004), The Fraulein and the Sandman (2011), Bon Schuur Ticino (2023) and The Last Screenwriter (2024).

== Early life and education ==
Luisi grew up in Switzerland as the son of an Italian father and an American mother. After finishing school in Zurich, he studied film and video production in the United States, initially at the University of North Carolina Wilmington until 1996, then at the University of California, Santa Cruz until his bachelor's degree in 1998.

== Career ==
=== Production company ===
Luisi worked for two years as a film editor in the advertising industry. In 2000, he founded the production company Spotlight Media Productions AG in Zurich, where he serves as a director, screenwriter and producer.

=== Film career ===
In 2004, Luisi made his debut as a feature film director with the comedy Verflixt verliebt, which was nominated for the Swiss Film Award in the Best Fiction Film category and won the Feature Film Award by the Filmfestival Max Ophüls in Saarbrücken. Luisi also worked on screenplays without being involved as a director, such as Vitus in 2005 and Länger leben in 2010. Vitus starred Bruno Ganz and premiered at the Berlinale 2006. It won the Swiss Film Award and was shortlisted for an Academy Award nomination in the category Best Foreign Language Film.

Luisi's third directorial work The Fraulein and the Sandman received the Audience Award at the 2011 Filmfestival Max Ophüls and another nomination for the Swiss Film Award for Best Fiction Film. In 2014, Luisi's comedy-drama Unlikely Heroes about asylum seekers rehearsing a performance of Schiller's Wilhelm Tell was released and was honoured with the Audience Award at the Locarno Film Festival. In 2017, his comedy Flitzer was released with the comedian and actor Beat Schlatter as co-screenwriter and leading actor. In 2021, Luisi made his second drama film Prinzessin, following Boys Are Us in 2012. Another collaboration with Schlatter took place in 2023 with the satirical film Bon Schuur Ticino, which is about a scenario in which multilingual Switzerland is determined to have only one national language. Bon Schuur Ticino is the seventh most successful Swiss film of all time based on admissions in Switzerland.

In 2024, Luisi's film The Last Screenwriter was released, which received attention due to its production story. The film script, about a screenwriter who realizes that artificial intelligence can write better than he can, was written entirely by ChatGPT under Luisi's direction. Luisi said that he wanted to contribute to the ongoing debate about the use of AI in the film industry and announced before completion that he would release the film online free of charge for this reason. The film was seen as controversial, a London art house cinema cancelled the premiere screening after criticism on the internet. In the same year, The Story of Frank and Nina by Paola Randi, which Luisi co-produced with Fandango Media in Italy, premiered at the Venice Film Festival and won the festival's Magic Lantern Award.

=== Television career ===
Together with comedians Dominic Deville and Patrick Karpiczenko, Luisi developed the late-night comedy show Deville Late Night, which aired on SRF 1 from 2016. Luisi also worked on the show for several years as a producer and writer. Other television formats realized by Luisi's Spotlight Media were the sketch show Twist – die Sketchcomedy (2013) and the crime comedy miniseries Advent, Advent (2020).

== Awards (selection) ==
Luisi's films have received numerous awards and nominations at international film festivals.

Swiss Film Awards

- 2005: Nominated in the Best Fiction Film category for Verflixt verliebt
- 2007: Nominated in the Best Screenplay category for Vitus
- 2011: Nominated in the Best Short Film category for Die Praktikantin
- 2011: Nominated in the Best Fiction Film category for The Fraulein and the Sandman
- 2011: Nominated in the Best Screenplay category for The Fraulein and the Sandman
- 2024: Nominated in the Best Screenplay category for Bon Schuur Ticino

Zürcher Filmpreis (Zurich Film Award)

- 2004: Award for Verflixt verliebt

Filmfestival Max Ophüls Prize

- 2004: Nominated for the Max Ophüls Prize for Verflixt verliebt
- 2004: Förderpreis Langfilm (Sponsorship Award for feature film) for Verflixt verliebt
- 2011: Nomination for Best Feature Film for The Fraulein and the Sandman
- 2011: Audience Award for The Fraulein and the Sandman

Locarno Film Festival

- 2014: Audience Award for Schweizer Helden

Brussels International Fantastic Film Festival

- 2011: Silver Méliès Award for The Fraulein and the Sandman

== Filmography ==
=== Film ===
Year	Title	Functions
1994	Verflixt verliebt	Director, screenwriter, producer
2006	Vitus	Screenwriter
2006	Love Made Easy	Director, screenwriter, producer
2010	Die Praktikantin	Director, screenwriter, producer
2010	Länger leben	Screenwriter
2011	The Fraulein and the Sandman (Der Sandmann)	Director, screenwriter, producer
2012	Boys Are Us	Director, screenwriter, producer
2014	Unlikely Heroes (Schweizer Helden)	Director, screenwriter, producer
2016	Love and Loopholes	Producer
2017	Flitzer	Director, screenwriter, producer
2021	Prinzessin	Director, screenwriter, producer
2023	Bon Schuur Ticino	Director, screenwriter, producer
2024	The Last Screenwriter	Director, producer
2024	The Story of Frank and Nina	Producer

=== Television ===
Year	Title	Functions
2002	Feuer oder Flamme (TV movie)	Screenwriter
2013	Twist – die Sketchcomedy (TV show)	Director, screenwriter, producer
2016–2019	Deville Late Night (TV show)	Producer, writer
2020	Advent, Advent (TV mini-series)	Producer
