= Cyril Takayama =

American magician

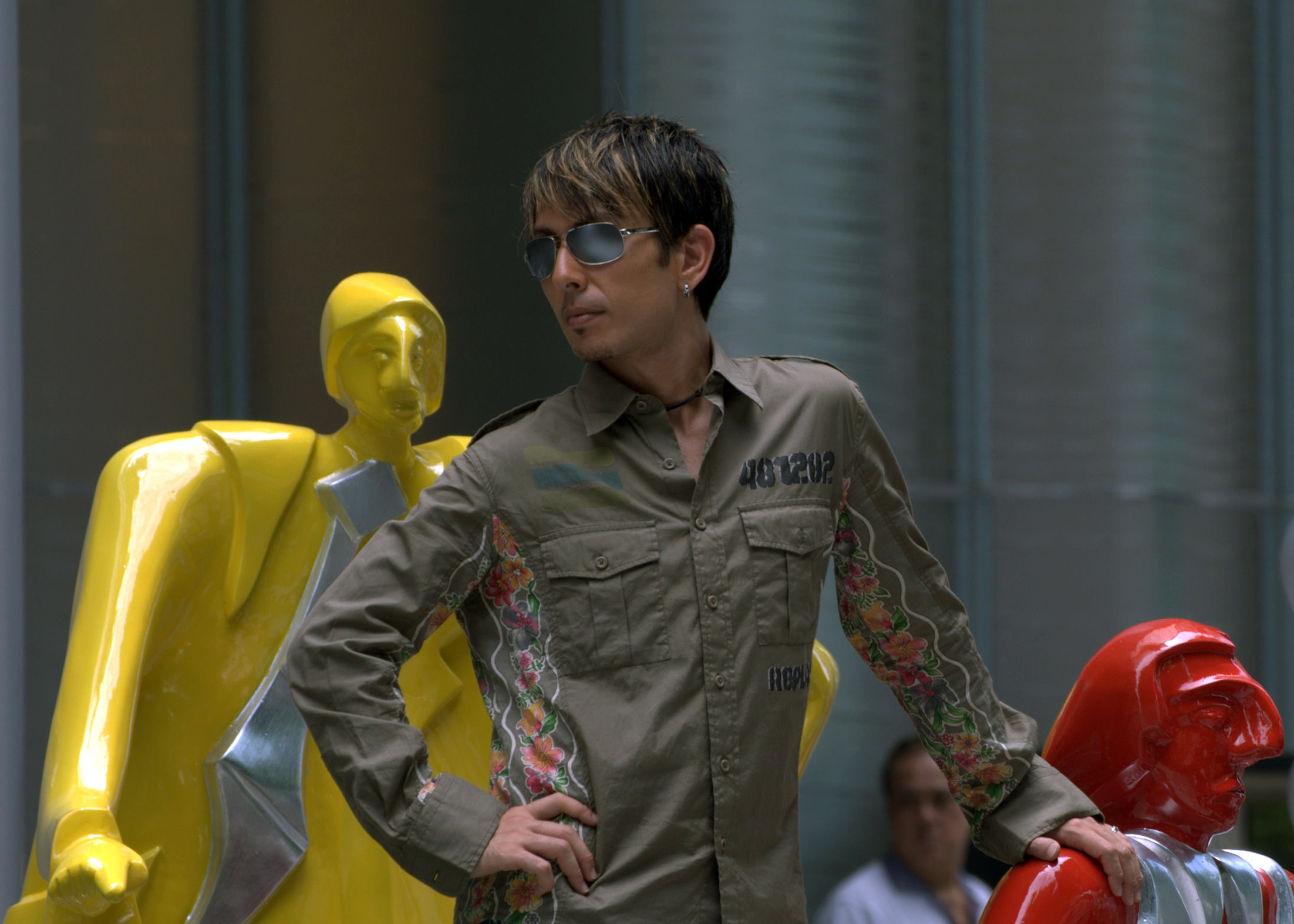
- Takayama in front of ION Orchard in Singapore
- Born: September 27, 1974 (age 51); Hollywood, California, U.S.
- Occupation: Magician
- Website: https://cyrilmagic.com/

Cyril Takayama (born September 27, 1974) is an American magician of French, Moroccan and Japanese descent who is perhaps best known for his magic performances around Japan.

== Early life ==
Cyril Takayama was born and raised in Hollywood, California. His father is from the Okinawa prefecture in Japan, while his mother is French of Moroccan descent, both of whom were beauticians. Cyril Takayama had a troubled upbringing, and a profile in Magic ("The Magazine for Magicians") published in the mid 2000s describes him being expelled from school at 15 and then dropping out of school at the age of 16. Cyril's father was upset at his behavioral problems and sent him to Japan, where he left the plane during a stopover in Tokyo, and ended up busking on the streets of Shinjuku. At times he had so little money that he could afford just one meal a day.

Cyril attempted to contact Japanese magic circles, but was viewed as an outsider. At the age of 17, Cyril met Ito, a rich Japanese businessman who employed him to perform in his hotel for 4 to 5 days a week. He performed as a magician for weddings and parties for two years, and created his own stage magic show within 2 months. Ito also sent Cyril to magic assemblies and competitions, and in 1991 Cyril was awarded a top prize by magic's international governing body, the International Federation of Magic Societies (FISM). In 1992, he joined the International Brotherhood of Magicians, and won another FISM prize in 1994. In 2001, he and his partner Jane won the Golden Lion Award at Siegfried and Roy's World Magic Seminar in Las Vegas. He is a member of the short-lived television series T.H.E.M.(2004). In 2007 he won first place in The Magic Woods Awards, Best Magician Category.

== Career ==
Takayama became interested in magic when he was six years old when he went to a magic show in Las Vegas where he saw a guest magician levitate a woman and cut himself in half. The first time Cyril ever performed magic in front of people was during his junior high school's talent show. At the age of 12, he entered the junior program at the Magic Castle in Hollywood.

Some of Cyril's signature tricks include the hamburger in the menu trick, having his head fall off his shoulders, and the card through window trick. His most dramatic trick was above the Circus Circus hotel, where he bungee jumps into the hotel pool with a sword and spears the chosen card of his co host from a deck floating in the water. To promote Metal Gear Solid 4: Guns of the Patriots, Cyril performed magic with the game itself, surprising the audience. Because of his large popularity in Japan, Cyril frequently goes out in a disguise, his most notable one being "Sero jisan" (セロ爺さん) or Old Man Cyril.

Since 2005, Cyril has been steadily increasing in popularity in Japan as well as on the Internet, due to many of his magic shows being uploaded and viewed on the popular video-sharing site YouTube. He has been dubbed Magic's first cyber celebrity.

== Appearances ==
In his 2006 magic specials, Cyril visited Thailand to put on a show for orphans with HIV. He also put on a show with kids in remote region of Nepal and performed few of the magic acts for small crowd near Tribhuvan International Airport.

He appeared on the MTV series called Room 401 (2007) where magicians prank unsuspecting victims. On May 31, 2008 he hosted the 2008 MTV Video Music Awards in Japan.

Cyril doesn't limit his work to television only. He travels around Japan performing grand magic stage shows known as "Magic Revolution: The Xperience".

He also appeared in the movie Redbelt, playing a minor role as the magician.

He has started appearing in new shows called "Cyril Simply Magic", "Cyril's Family Vacations", and his most recent shows "Cyril Rio Magic" on AXN.

He was a speaker and performer at the 2010 Essential Magic Conference that took place in Portugal.

On August 26, 2012, Cyril and Hong Kong movie star Andy Lau performed an illusion at the Miss Hong Kong Pageant 2012.
