= Jean-Philippe Ceppi =

- Born: 1962 (age 63–64); Lausanne, Switzerland
- Education: University of Fribourg (history, philosophy, journalism), University of Lausanne (MBA)
- Occupations: Investigative journalist, educator
- Years active: 1987–present
- Known for: Being the first journalist characterizing the 1994 Rwanda massacres as genocide

Jean-Philippe Ceppi (born 1962 in Lausanne) is a Swiss investigative journalist. He is best known for being the first journalist to publicly characterize the 1994 massacres in Rwanda as genocide, in an article published by the French daily Libération.

== Education ==
Ceppi studied history, philosophy, and journalism at the University of Fribourg and holds a Master of Business Administration from the University of Lausanne. He authored a doctoral thesis on the history of hidden camera reporting in television journalism at the University of Lausanne.

== Career ==
Ceppi began as a journalist at the Bureau de reportage et de recherche d'information (BRRI), an investigative press agency. He worked in print and radio media across Europe and Africa, contributing to launching Le Nouveau Quotidien and serving as correspondent in Nairobi and Johannesburg for Libération, the BBC, Radio Suisse Romande, and Le Nouveau Quotidien. Upon returning to Switzerland, he created the investigative unit for Le Temps, became editor-in-chief of Dimanche.ch, and joined Radio Télévision Suisse in December 2001, presenting Temps Présent for about twenty years. He stepped down from presenting in 2024 to return to field reporting. Ceppi teaches investigative journalism at the University of Neuchâtel.

== Rwanda ==
While based in Nairobi, Ceppi covered the Rwandan genocide in 1994. He is considered the first journalist to apply the term "genocide" to the events, four days after it began, in an article published on April 11, 1994, in the French daily newspaper Libération. · · The term was first used by Philippe Gaillard, head of the International Committee of the Red Cross in Kigali, in an interview with Ceppi, stating: "I think a genocide is underway and cannot be stopped." In his April 11, 1994 article, Ceppi described the hunt for Tutsis house by house, with lists and massacres by entire families, concluding: "Before the Rwandan Patriotic Front recaptures Kigali, if they can, the genocide of the Tutsi there will probably have taken place."

== Publications ==
- Nos déchets toxiques, L'Afrique a faim, v'là nos poubelles, Centre Europe-Tiers-Monde, 1989. ISBN 9782880530129 (in French)
- Glisser sur une glace dangereusement fine: Histoire de la caméra cachée en journalisme de télévision, Alphil, 2023. ISBN 9782889501250 (in French)
