= Buzzkill (TV series) =

- Created by: Dave Sheridan
- Starring: Dave Sheridan; Travis Draft; Frank Hudetz; Vince D'Orazi
- Country of origin: United States
- Original language: English
- No. of seasons: 1
- No. of episodes: 7

Original release
- Network: MTV
- Release: May 13 – June 17, 1996

Buzzkill is a hidden-camera reality show which started airing in 1996 on the MTV network. The show derived its name from the slang term buzzkill, meaning a sudden undesired event that causes one's "high" or "buzz" to become of a lesser experience or depleted. Each new episode was set in a different location and consisted of three separate pranks.

== Premise ==
A forerunner to prank reality shows, Buzzkill was essentially a series of elaborate pranks (backed by a major television network's budget) played not only on the layman but often on celebrities and major public figures. Each prank was played by three aspiring actors from the Chicago area: Dave Sheridan (creator), Frank Hudetz, and Travis Draft.

The show's most memorable moment was when Hudetz disguised himself as famous designer Isaac Mizrahi. The likeness was so uncanny that he fooled superstar Whitney Houston at an awards show; when Houston discovered the error, she felt she was made a fool of and vowed never to appear on MTV again.

The show was eventually cancelled due to litigation concerns at MTV. Because of Buzzkill, more outrageous reality shows were developed for MTV, including The Tom Green Show, Jackass, and Punk'd.

The show's theme song uses the same verse and chorus melody as the GG Allin classic 'Multiple Forms of Self-Satisfaction'.

== Episode guide ==
Episode Location & Title		Original airdate	#
Pilot: Panama City Beach, Florida		May 1, 1996	1
#1	"Commercial Auditions"	The boys hit the beach to cast for a fake Coconut Tropics Commercial. The goal was to see how far people would go, to be on TV. Travis played the male model in his Speedos with a crotch cam. They boys goal was to get people to put lotion where the sun don't shine.	
#2	"The Free Shuttle"	They set up a fake shuttle business over Spring Break, with 2 of them dressed rattly acting like the proprietors and the other as a plant in the van who said he was getting a ride from their business. They picked up a bunch of college kids and said they'd shuttle them about 5 miles down the road for a cheap price. 2 hours later they were still driving, "lost" in the area. Eventually they had to stop and get gas, and the one who went inside ran back into the van with pantyhose over his head and yelled "Dude, GO!!" They peeled out of the station as the kids in the back looked totally horrified.	
#3	"Fame or Shame Revenge"	Fame or Shame was an MTV talent program during Spring Break of that year. They went on as contestants, and in the middle of their "performance," pull out super soakers and start going after the judges.	
Miami, Florida		June 18, 1996	2
#1	"Safety Guys"	In this Buzzkill, they give a streetside safety seminar to the tourists who walk by. They give the tourists different "technologies" for keeping themselves safe, such as swinging your purse around to prevent purse theft, and how to defend yourself against an attack by a man wearing an alligator suit. In the second half, they become guardian angels for two guys and they follow them around Miami Beach, until the two guys say enough is enough and command them to leave.	
#2	"Paparazzi (Mistaken Identity)"	They play paparazzi guys for the evening. They go down to the clubs, hang out on the sidewalks, and mistake everyday people for celebrities. The mistaken celebrities include Jackie Chan, Susanne Summers, Bonjovi, and Ice from American Gladiators. The three young punks see if these people pretend to be famous, and to top it off, Travis goes around asking for autographs. Dave and Travis get one guy to pretend to be Milli Vanilli and they interview him about the future of the group.	
#3	"The Fashion Show"	It just so happens that Frank bears an uncanny resemblance to designer Isaac Mizrahi. Travis and Dave pose as student designers working under Isaac. As Frank walks the town, Dave and Travis get people off the beach to be models in their fashion show, Apocalypse Wow!. They dress the models in everything from putting greens to laser tag vests. In a Buzzkill fashion show, even garment bags and toy cowboy hats can be passed off as designer originals.	
New Orleans, Louisiana		June 25, 1996	3
#1	"The Taste Test"	The three guys give a street-side New Orleans cuisine taste test to the people walking by, but they don't use any normal foods. They make gumbolaya out of Spam and cat food, and creole cola out of vinegar and salt. To top it off they add Dave's Insanity Hot Sauce to all the samples to make everything painfully mouth scorching hot. In addition, they feed a man a beetle and tell another guy that the food he just ate had cat urine in it.	
#2	"Voodoo"	The punks give a voodoo show in the middle of Jackson Square, home to street performers, musicians, and other freaks. Frank and Dave play a voodoo priest and caller, respectively, while Travis pretends to be a volunteer picked from the crowd. Travis' soul supposedly enters Dave's voodoo doll. Through an ear piece, Travis can hear everything Dave tells the other volunteers from the crowd to do with the voodoo doll. After making Travis spin around and then "burning" his feet with a lighter, things go terribly wrong. Dave sticks a pin through the doll and Travis dies with fake blood on his shirt. Frank and Dave shake the spot.	
#3	"The Streak"	The Buzzkillers pretend to be members of a coalition who want to legalize streaking. They set up outside the New Orleans Jazz Festival where there is an abundance of hippies and love children. They get a whole group of supporters to wear their pro-streaking shirts. At the end of the day, they run down the street naked with their supporters running at their sides like the secret police escorting the president.	
Atlanta, Georgia		July 2, 1996	4
#1	"Diplomat's Son"	Frank dresses as Prince Fahtuu, an Ambassador's son visiting Atlanta for the Summer Games. Dave and Travis pose as his bodyguards. They visit a clothing store, a fastfood place, a restaurant, and an adult sexual fetish shop. The Prince also teaches the Americans he meets his own customs of switching hats for his personal photographs, and putting ketchup on your finger and licking it off during lunch.	
#2	"Scare Crowes"	The troublemakers go to Music Midtown, a three-day concert on seven stages. They pretend to be the Scare Crowes, the unofficial Black Crowes fan club. Frank dresses up in a crow suit, and their goal is to crowd surf him on to the stage while the Black Crowes are performing. They spend the whole day getting everyone excited about the Crow. They try to sneak back stage but they the security guards know about their plan so they can't. That night, while the Black Crowes are performing, they get the Crowe crowd surfing, but right before he gets to the stage, he is dropped.	
#3	"Torch Watch"	The guys become the official Advance Torch Committee. Frank hands out American flags to people on the sidewalk so they can wave them as Dave runs by, carrying the official "Test Torch." They also have other people run with the torch and tell them to meet another runner who isn't there, the torch goes out and Dave gets a lady on the street to relight it, and as Dave is running down the street, he trips on a cone and hurts himself and a man from the crowd comes out to help him run.	
New York, New York		July 9, 1996	5
#1	"Lunch With Dave"	The three guys pretend to be filming a sketch for the Late Show entitled Things not to do in a Restaurant." Dave poses as David Letterman's stand in for the sketch. Frank goes to the Ed Sullivan Theater and recruits people to be in the sketch. The people have lunch with Dave in an outdoor restaurant. As Dave reads the things not do in a restaurant, the people recruited act them out. He has people pour ice down their shirt, eat butter, and even put ketchup on their hands and yell, "Hey, I'm O.J."	
#2	"Butt Art"	Dave and Travis enter the "Art Around the Park" art show as Butt Artists. They put plastic pants on people, paint things on to their butts representing where they are from and what they do, and then have the people press their butts on to a canvas, leaving the image. They make a painting called Butts Across America with peoples butt prints in the area where they're from. Frank poses as a critic at the show. He brings people over to look at Butts Across America and makes comments as they paint their master piece	
#3	"Unabomber: The Musical"	The buzzkillers put out a casting call in a newspaper for their play, "Manifesto: Unabomber the Musical." Dave and Travis pretend to be the director and the musical director. Frank poses as an over pretentious actor trying to get the part. About half a dozen other people show up for the audition. The actors are dressed in hooded sweatshirts, sunglasses, and fake mustaches and are forced to sing ridiculous songs about the life and crimes of the Unabomber.	
Hollywood, California		July 16, 1996	6
#1	"Singled Out"	The boys enter the show "Singled Out" and try to get dates. Frank and Dave pose as Rex Braxton, "Chick Magnet," and Doug Thompson, "Self Proclaimed Stud," respectively. Travis just dresses normal because he's filming everything with the glasses cam. Frank doesn't get on the show because he left his ID at the racquetball club, but Dave and Travis make it on. Unfortunately, the girl gets rid of all the guys who are samurais in the bedroom and Dave is shot down. But he is willing to turn the other cheek, and he moons her with a pair of underwear the reads, "Your Loss Babe."	
#2	"MTV Birthday Surprise"	Next the three guys crash the MTV Beach House's fourth birthday. They rig up a cake with a 150 p.s.i. air tank under it to blow the cake sky high. Frank and Dave act as employees of the Acme Cake Company. Travis pretends to one of the extras at the Beach House having fun at the party. At the exact moment the Beach House turns four years old, Dave hits the switch and blows the cake. They then dawn their Buzzkill ski masks and start throwing cake everywhere and throwing people into the pool.	
#3	"Casting Call"	For the first time on Buzzkill, the guys don't pretend to be anyone. They give out a casting call for the fourth Buzzkill member, with no intention of actually hiring them, of course. They do test Buzzkills with the applicants. They dress a girl in a banana suit and drive down to the Chinese Mann Theater. She then puts vegetable soup in her mouth, creates a big scene, and then throws up. Then they have a guy put on boots and a pair of leopard speedos. They have a camera in his crotch and his goal is to get people to do a close up. But as he is trying to raise change to buy a pair of pants, they bail on him and leave him in front of the Chinese Theater in his speedos.	
Best of Buzzkill		September 17, 1996	7
#1	"Fame or Shame Revenge"		
#2	"Torch Watch"	The guys become the official Advance Torch Committee. Frank hands out American flags to people on the sidewalk so they can wave them as Dave runs by, carrying the official "Test Torch." They also have other people run with the torch and tell them to meet another runner who isn't there, the torch goes out and Dave gets a lady on the street to relight it, and as Dave is running down the street, he trips on a cone and hurts himself and a man from the crowd comes out to help him run.	
#3	"Voodoo"	The punks give a voodoo show in the middle of Jackson Square, home to street performers, musicians, and other freaks. Frank and Dave play a voodoo priest and caller, respectively, while Travis pretends to be a volunteer picked from the crowd. Travis' soul supposedly enters Dave's voodoo doll. Through an ear piece, Travis can hear everything Dave tells the other volunteers from the crowd to do with the voodoo doll. After making Travis spin around and then "burning" his feet with a lighter, things go terribly wrong. Dave sticks a pin through the doll and Travis dies with fake blood on his shirt. Frank and Dave shake the spot.	
Portland, Oregon		September 17, 1996	8
#1	"Franks Among the Missing"		
#2	"You Gotta Have Heart"		
#3	"Yellow Bike Spokesperson"		
Detroit, Michigan		1996	9
#1	"Smash My Car"	At the old Tiger Stadium One of the guys stands in front of a jalope, holding a sledgehammer and asking anyone who walks by whether or not they are interested in smashing the car. Once someone starts to do so, another Buzzkill guy comes out saying that the car is in fact his.	
#2	"Synchronized Bowling"	At a bowling alley in Hazel Park.	
#3	"Singing Telegram Pizza"	A delivery guy at a funeral home in Clinton Township.	
Colorado		1996	10
#1	"Mafia Skiers"		
#2	"Wrestling 101"		
#3	"Scavenger Hunt"		
Kansas City, Kansas		1996	11
#1	Fashion Cop		
#2	"ZZZZZZ…"		
#3	"Free Pizza"		
Minneapolis, Minnesota		1996	12
#1	"Sweepstakes Squad"		
#2	"Fragrance Fiasco"		
#3	"Ball Hogs"		
Sturgis, South Dakota		1996	13
#1	"Moped Boy"		
#2	"Sooper Dooper Customer Service"		
#3	"A Detective Story"		
Kurt Posin Trilogy		1996	14
#1	"Bigfoot, Biggerfoot"	One of the three guys poses as a Bigfoot sighting tour guide in the Pacific Northwest. One of the other guys dresses up as Bigfoot. During the fake tour, Bigfoot jumps out.	
#2	"Psychic in Training"		
#3	"Alien Spew Trackers"		
Washington, D.C.		1996	15
#1	"Operation Dirty Laundry"		
#2	"The Russkie Express"		
#3	"Dirty Doings in D.C."		
Fan Buzzkillz		1996	16
#1	"Recording Studio Mayhem"		
#2	"Teacher of the Year"		
#3	"All Choked Up"		
Nashville, Tennessee		1996	17
#1	"Supermodel Surprise"		
#2	"Wax Dummy"		
#3	"A Star is Born"		
Valentine's Day Buzzkill		1996	18
#1	"Green Card Shark"		
#2	"Lover In The Trunk"		
#3	"The Perfect Match"	The guys set up a fake video dating service. An unsuspecting woman comes in and sets up a video profile, talking about her various interests. One of the guys is behind the scenes, dressed up extremely creepily (with the perv stache and all) and sets up his own video profile, mimicking the woman's almost identically. The guys posing as the dating service owners excitedly show the woman the fake profile, saying what an unbelievably perfect match this guy is for her. The woman is horrified as she watches the video and realizes that the guy is essentially reciting her profile verbatim. She is doubly horrified when the creep shows up behind her out of nowhere. Aghast, she flees to the parking lot while the creepy guy follows her.	
Favorites		1997	19
#1	"Synchronized Bowling"	From the Detroit, MI episode.	
#2	"The Russkie Express"	From the Washington D.C. episode.	
#3	"Supermodel Surprise"	From the Nashville, TN episode.	
Portrait of a Serial Character		1997	20
#1			
#2			
#3			
The Buzzie Awards		1997	21
#1			
#2			
#3			
