= Infarto =

- Genre: Prank Show; Black Comedy; Drama
- Country of origin: Mexico

Production
- Camera setup: Hidden camera
- Running time: 60 minutes (including commercials)

Original release
- Network: Azteca 13; Azteca América
- Release: 2004 – 2006

Infarto (Spanish for heart attack) is a hidden camera show on Azteca 13 in Mexico and Azteca América in the United States. People and famous people appearing on the show have been subjected to pranks such as the victim believing that they will be sacrificed in a cult ritual or believing that they will be murdered by axe-wielding neighbors amid a blackout. Because of the extreme and extravagant nature of the show's content, But due to the terrible acting, this show seemed to be completely staged. . Sci-Fi Channel's original show Scare Tactics is modeled after this concept.

In Spanish and Portuguese, 'infarto' commonly refers to 'infarto de miocardio,' known in English as 'myocardial infarction' or 'heart attack.

== Pop culture ==
In the United States, despite Azteca América's limited availability as the network was shown on mostly low-powered TV stations, the show has caught attention of a couple late night talk shows.

- The American television show The Soup, known for its lampooning week-in-review of celebrity and television stories, began airing short clips of Infarto since July 2006, mainly to mock the deep, menacing voice which utters "Infarto" when the show's title logo is displayed. This may, in part, be because "Infarto" contains the word "fart" and is therefore amusing to English-speakers. The Soup host Joel McHale has called Infarto "the most evil practical-joke show in the world".
- Late night television show Jimmy Kimmel Live! aired a clip of the show featuring a knife-wielding old man.
