= David Minkin =

David Minkin is an American magician and an International Champion of Close-Up Magic. He co-starred in the documentary film, Magicians: Life In The Impossible released in 2017 in limited theaters and on Netflix. Minkin was also a magician cast member on the MTV series Room 401 produced by Ashton Kutcher, and a co-star of the television show "Magic Outlaws" on the Travel Channel with fellow magicians Chris Korn and Ben Seidman. Among Minkin's other television appearances was a segment that aired on American Idol, which was filmed in Los Angeles with the show's contestants visiting the Magic Castle.

== Career ==
In 2007, Minkin won First Place in the close-up category of the International Brotherhood of Magicians' annual Convention in Reno, Nevada.

Minkin has an ongoing magic and wine tasting show in Hollywood and in Anaheim, called "Magic and Wine: An Evening of Enchantment". Now in its eleventh year, it is the longest-running one-man magic show in Los Angeles. In 2014, it was voted the "Best Magical Date Night" in Los Angeles by LA Weekly.

== Sources ==
- Travel Channel's Mikey Roe searches for America's best late-night eateries in new 'Feed the Beast' series
- The Hollywood Reporter Reviews The Film, Magicians: Life In The Impossible
