= Hidden camera =

Type of surveillance camera

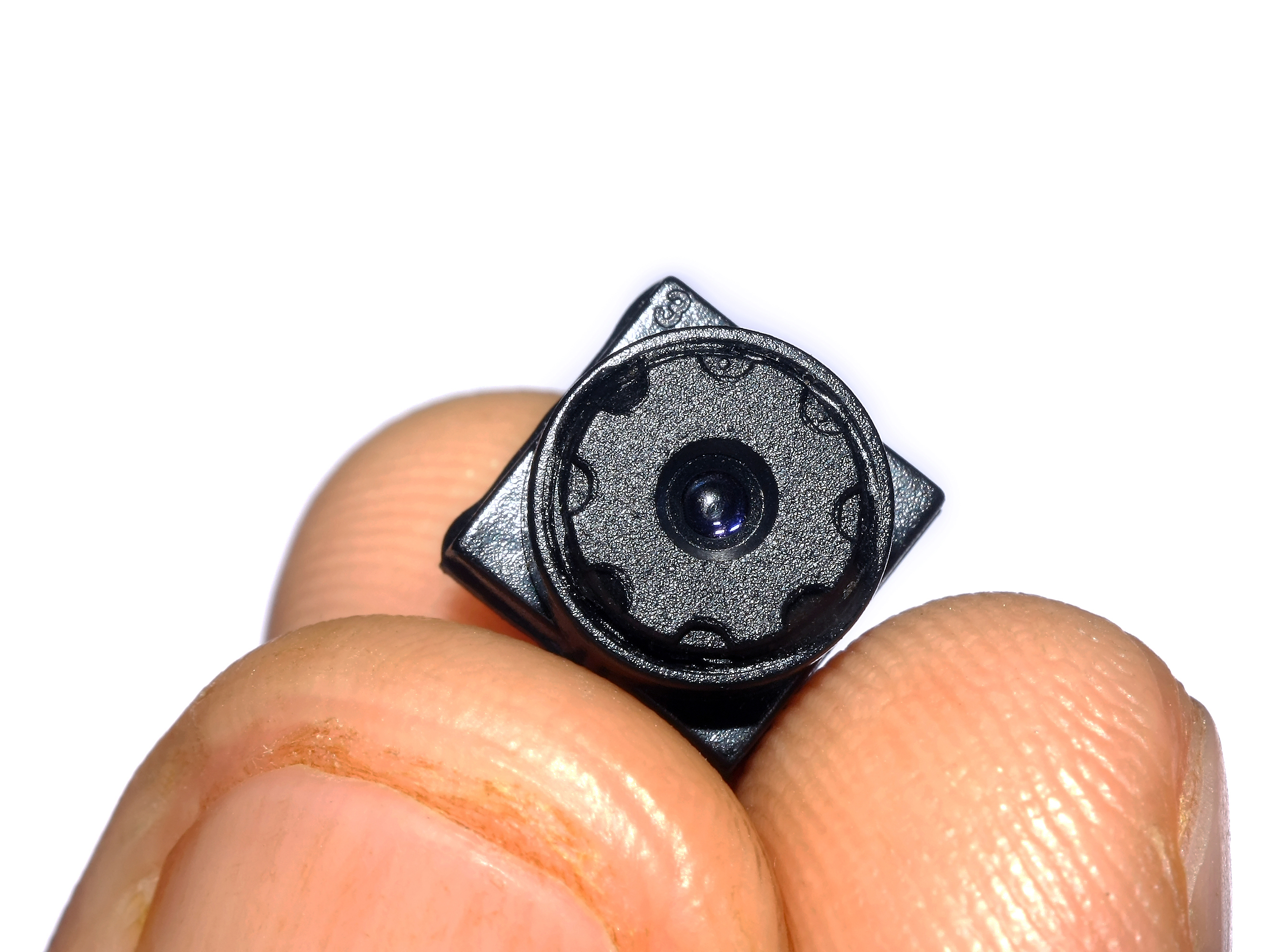
8 mm × 8 mm lens with a built-in image sensor, used for a mini camcorder

A hidden camera or spy camera is a camera used to photograph or record subjects, often people, without their knowledge. The camera may be considered "hidden" because it is not visible to the subject being filmed, or is disguised as another object. Hidden cameras are often considered a surveillance tool.

The term "hidden camera" is commonly used when subjects are unaware that they are being recorded, usually lacking their knowledge and consent; the term "spy camera" is generally used when the subject would object to being recorded if they were aware of the camera's presence. In contrast, the phrase "security camera" refers to cameras that are visible and/or are accompanied by a warning notice of their presence, so the subject is aware of the camera's presence and knows they are being filmed.

The use of hidden cameras raises personal privacy issues. There may be legal aspects to consider, depending on the jurisdiction in which they are used.

== Description ==
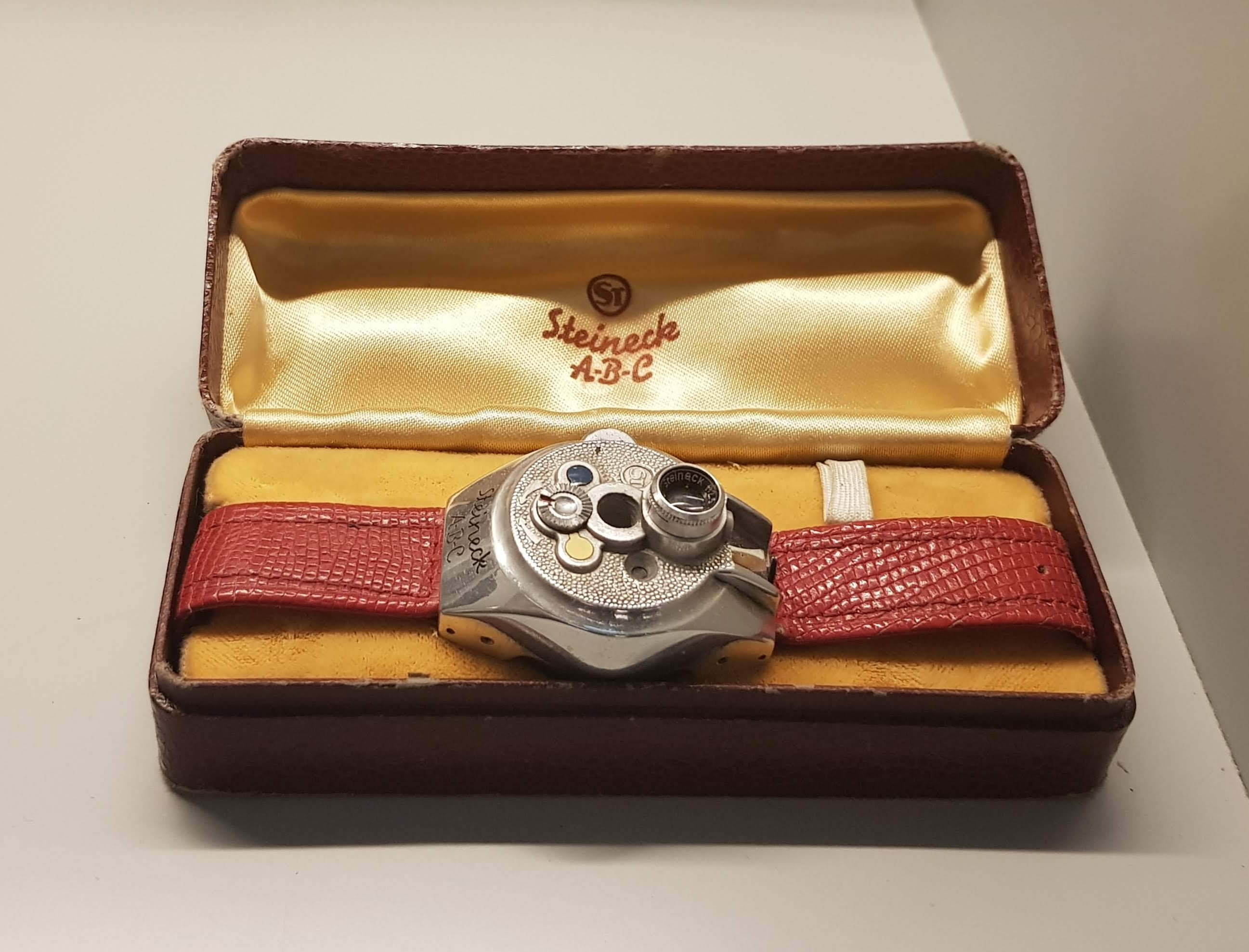
Steineck ABC watch camera

A hidden camera can be wired or Wireless. Hidden cameras are connected, by cable or wirelessly, to a viewing or recording device, such as a television, computer, videocassette recorder, network video recorder, digital video recorder, memory card, or another data storage medium. They may also store their images or recordings online, such as through a livestream. Hidden video cameras may or may not have audio recording capabilities. Hidden cameras may be activated manually, remotely, or through motion detection.

A hidden camera may not be visible to the subject, for example, because it is fitted with a long-focus lens and located beyond the view of the subject, or because it is obscured or hidden by an object, such as a one-way mirror. Hidden cameras can be built into a wide variety of items, ranging from electronics (e.g. television sets, smoke detectors, clocks, motion detectors, mobile phones, and personal computers) to everyday objects where electronics are not expected to be found (e.g. stationery, plants, glasses, clothing, cigarette packs, and street lights).

Walter Zapp pioneered secret cameras between 1937 and 1943 in Germany, utilizing the subminiature format.

== Use ==
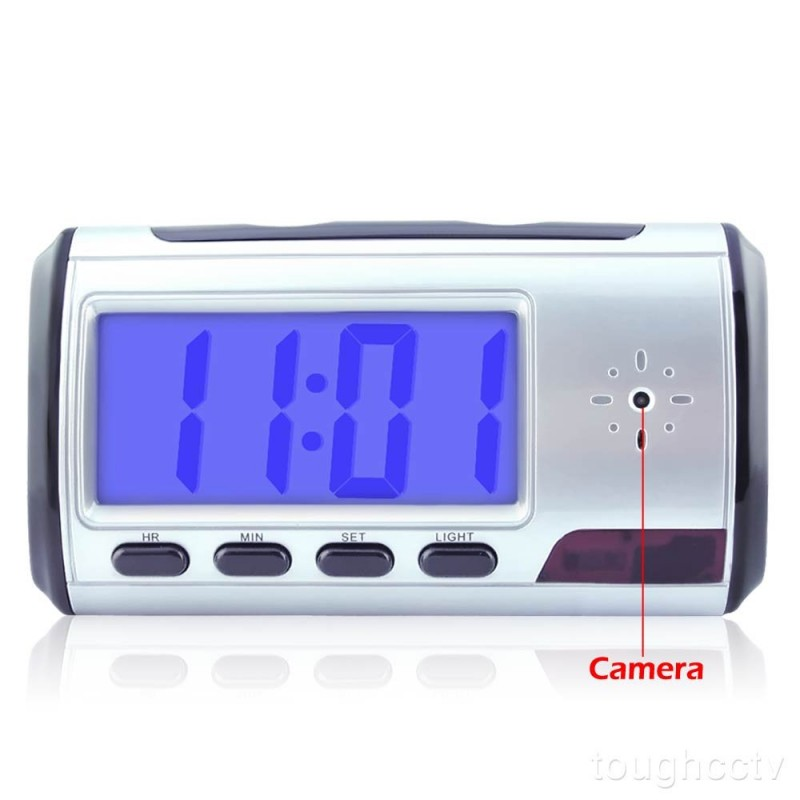
Hidden camera in digital alarm clock

Common applications for hidden cameras are property security, personal surveillance, photography, or entertainment purposes, though they may also be used for espionage or surveillance by law enforcement, intelligence agencies, investigative journalists, corporations, or other entities. They may also be used for illegal activity, such as criminal scope-outs, stalking, or voyeurism.

Hidden cameras may be installed within common household objects for parents to monitor and record the activities of nannies and sometimes the children themselves. These hidden cameras are commonly referred to as "nanny cams". The use of nanny cams can be a subject of controversy. For example, a 2003 criminal case in Florida, involving a nanny that was allegedly caught by a nanny cam violently shaking a baby, was thrown out in 2006 when the video was considered "worthless evidence"; however, this was due to issues regarding video quality, not legality, and several earlier cases used clearer nanny cam footage as evidence. Some hidden camera television shows have also led to lawsuits or the cancellation of episodes by the people who were trapped in set-ups that they found unpleasant.

Hidden cameras are sometimes placed in holiday rental apartments such as those advertised on Airbnb. Questions have been raised about the safety and privacy of holidaymakers in these circumstances.

== In media ==
Hidden cameras are sometimes used in reality television and social media, where they are used to catch participants in unusual or absurd situations. Participants will either know they will be filmed, but not always exactly when or where; or they will not know they have been filmed until later, at which point they may sign a release or give consent to the footage being produced for a show. This latter subgenre of unwitting participants began in the 1940s with Allen Funt's Candid Microphone theatrical short films.

Examples of use of hidden cameras in television shows
Show name	Channel	Years of production	Number of episodes
$25 Million Dollar Hoax	NBC	2004	3
Animal Kidding	Animal Planet	2003	16
Balls of Steel	Channel 4	2005	19
Beadle's About	ITV	1986–1996	94
Boiling Points	MTV	2003–2005	
Breaking Up with Shannen Doherty	Oxygen	2006	14
Burned	MTV	2003	30
Buzzkill	MTV	1995	
Candid Camera	ABC/NBC/CBS/PAX	1948–1954, 1960–1967, 1987–1988, 1996–2004	1,000+
The Carbonaro Effect	truTV	2014	27
Celebrity Undercover	MTV		20
Cheaters			
Crossballs: The Debate Show	Comedy Central		
Da Ali G Show	Channel 4		
Damage Control	MTV	2005	16
Dirty Sexy Funny: Olivia Lee	Comedy Central UK		8
Faking the Video	MTV	2004	7
Fire Me...Please	CBS	2005	4
Fool Britannia	ITV	2012	
Fool Canada	CBC	2015	
Freak Out	Freeform	2014–2015	
Funny Business			
Girls Behaving Badly	Oxygen	2002–2007	72
Guys Behaving Badly	Oxygen	2005	5
Hi-Jinks	NIK	2005	
Hidden Howie: The Private Life of a Public Nuisance	BRAVO	2005	6
Impractical Jokers	truTV	2011–	143
Infarto	Azteca América	2005	
Instant Recall	GSN	2010	8
Invasion of the Hidden Cameras (When Hidden Cameras Attack)	FOX		12
I'm Spazticus	Channel 4	2012–	10
Jamie Kennedy Experiment	WB	2003	
Just for Laughs Gags		2000	3,000+
Just Kidding		2012	
Kids Behaving Badly	Oxygen	2005	10
Laugh Out Loud	M-Net		
Meet the Marks	FOX	2002	7
MotorMouth	VH1		
My Big Fat Obnoxious Boss			
My Big Fat Obnoxious Fiancé			
Naked Camera	RTÉ Two	2005–2007	18
Oblivious			
People Traps	Animal Planet	2002	1
Peter Jacobsen Plugged In			
Punk'd	MTV	2003–2007, 2012	6
PrankStars	Disney Channel	2011–2016	6
Que Locura	Venevisión	2001	
Rank the Prank	CBBC	2016	
ROOM 401	MTV	2007	
The Real Wedding Crashers	NBC	2007	6
Really Naked Truth	Playboy		22
Red Handed	UPN	1999	
Red Light Districts	Outdoor Life Network	2003–2004	14
Scare Tactics	Syfy	2003	
Show Me the Funny	FOX	1998	155
Skunked TV	NBC	2004	13
Sledgehammer	VH1	2001	5
Spy TV	NBC	2001	27
Taxicab Confessions	HBO	1995	
That's Funny		2004	80
Totally Hidden Extreme Magic	NBC		2
Totally Busted	PlayboyTV	2003	
Totally Hidden Video	FOX	1989	
Tourist Traps		2001	6
Trapped in TV Guide	TVG	2006	
Trigger Happy TV		UK 2000/US 2003	13
TV's Bloopers and Practical Jokes			
Ultimate Revenge	TNN/SPIKE	2001	26
Videomatch	Telefé (Argentina)	1991–2004	
What Would You Do?	ABC	since 2009	
World Shut Your Mouth	BBC	2005	7
Walk the Prank	Disney XD	2016	
Wow Mali/Wow Mali Pa Rin!	TV5	since 1996	
You're On!	Nickelodeon	1998	
You've Got a Friend (My New Best Friend)	MTV	2004	8

== Legal issues ==
=== South Korea ===
The use of hidden cameras for illegal purposes is banned in South Korea. Thousands of "illegal filming" crimes take place every year in the country, typically through the installation of hidden cameras in public bathrooms, with the resulting videos shared online. Taking and distributing pictures of someone's body against their will in a way that "may cause any sexual stimulus or shame" is punished with sentences of up to five years in prison or fines of up to 10 million won ($US8,900).

=== United Kingdom ===
The use of hidden cameras is generally permitted under UK law, if used in a legal manner and towards legitimate ends. Individuals may use covert surveillance in their own home, in the workplace for employee monitoring, outside of a domestic or commercial property for security purposes and in security situations where there may be a need to do so. There are a number of laws under the Data Protection Act and Human Rights Acts that may affect the use of hidden cameras.

In any type of covert surveillance, footage should only be used for the purpose for which it has been taken, which must be a legitimate security reason. The person in possession of the footage is responsible for its use, and must only retain footage for as long as it is reasonably needed. It is not permitted to release the footage to third parties except when there is a legal necessity.

It is illegal under UK law to deploy covert cameras in areas where individuals would have an expectation of privacy, such as bathrooms, changing rooms, and locker rooms. It is also illegal to place hidden cameras in someone else's home or on someone else's property.

=== United States ===
In the United States, the purchase, ownership, and use of hidden cameras and nanny cams is generally considered legal in all 50 states. However, U.S. Code Title 18, Chapter 119, Section 2512 prohibits the interception of oral communication by "surreptitious manner" such as a hidden recording device, and so most hidden video cameras are not available with audio recording. Additionally, it is illegal in 13 states to record audio without express or written consent of the nanny being recorded. Despite this, some hidden cameras are still sold in the United States with audio recording capabilities, though their use is illegal and their recordings cannot legally be used as evidence.

== Bibliography ==
=== Use in the media ===
- Jean-Philippe Ceppi, « Glisser sur une glace dangereusement fine, Histoire de la caméra cachée en journalisme de télévision », Alphil, 2023, ISBN 9782889501250 (in French)

== See also ==
- Secret photography
- Closed-circuit television
- Dashcam
- Gun camera
- Subminiature photography
- Video door-phone
- The Truman Show
