= Jacob Samuel Minkin =

American rabbi

Jacob Samuel Minkin (1885-1962) was an American rabbi, hospital chaplain and an author on Jewish history and Hasidism.

== Overview ==
Minkin was born in 1885 in Švenčionys, Lithuania (then part of the Russian Empire). He was subsequently educated in Prague and New York City. Minkin served as a congregational rabbi for Conservative Judaism and later as a chaplain at Fordham Hospital. He authored a number of works on Jewish history. He died in 1962 in Tel Aviv, Israel.

In 1910, Minkin received rabbinical ordaination from the Jewish Theological Seminary of America. His congregational posts included serving in Hamilton, Ontario, Rochester, New York, and New York City.

Minkin's wife, Fanny, was a graduate of the Brooklyn Law School and was actively involved in the leadership of the Women's League for Conservative Judaism (WLCJ).

== Works ==
- The Romance of Hassidism (1935)
- Herod: A Biography (1936)
- Abarbanel and the Expulsion of the Jews from Spain (1938)
- The World of Moses Maimonides (1957)
- The Shaping of the Modern Mind: The Life and Thought of the Great Jewish Philosophers (1963)
- Gabriel da Costa (1969)
- The Teachings of Maimonides (1977)
