= Room 401 =

- Presented by: Jared Padalecki
- Country of origin: United States
- Original language: English
- No. of seasons: 1
- No. of episodes: 8

Production
- Running time: 30 minutes
- Production companies: Toy Plane Industries; Proud Mary Entertainment; Katalyst

Original release
- Network: MTV
- Release: July 17 – August 21, 2007

Room 401 is a hidden camera/reality television series on MTV executive produced by Ashton Kutcher and Jason Goldberg. It is named after the room Harry Houdini died in at Detroit's Grace Hospital in 1926. The show also used some of his famous acts.

Room 401 took unaware victims into the center of pranks that played like mini horror movies. From the reanimation of the dead, to chain-saw mishaps, each episode contains four "scares" or pranks. The show was hosted by Jared Padalecki from The CW's Supernatural.

== Episode list ==
=== Episode 1 ===
- Getting Crabby: Two women witness a man (played by comedic magician Justin "Kredible" Willman) pull his chest apart and crabs come out.
- The Claw: A woman wants her friend to win her something from a claw machine, but the claw doesn't work, so a maintenance man (played by magician/actor Rob Zabrecky) sticks his hand through the glass and pulls out a rat.
- He Sees Dead People: Two crime scene cleaners go to a crime scene and one of the men witnesses the dead man's spirit (played by magician David Minkin) sitting up from his body.
- Lend a Hand: Two men go to work at a meat factory and one of the men witnesses his co-worker lose his hand in a fryer then it's right back on.

=== Episode 2 ===
- Ice Carving: An accident with a chainsaw operator (played by magician/actor Rob Zabrecky) leaves an ice sculptor alive, but in two pieces.
- Jar Head: While cleaning a warehouse two guys find a mysterious head preserved in a jar that blinks and talks (played by magician/actor Rob Zabrecky).
- He Gone!: A supernatural taxi driver disappears after being pulled over by the police. Note: This prank was featured in VH1's special "40 Greatest Pranks 2".
- Lose Your Head: A guy on the bus (played by Japanese street illusionist Cyril Takayama) is barely able to hold onto his head. Note: This prank was featured in VH1's special "40 Greatest Pranks 2".

=== Episode 3 ===
- Beauty Is Only Skin Deep: A young woman is pushed underneath the waters of a hottub and emerges elderly.
- Return to Sender: A man in a diaper comes out of a small, strange box on a worker's first night on the job.
- Fasten Your Seat Belts: A man is pulled through an airplane turbine in front of a woman's eyes, and then comes up to her two minutes later, completely unharmed.
- Scrubbing In: A man has poisonous fish (fugu) and another (played by magician David Minkin) goes through his stomach and pulls out the poisonous fish.

=== Episode 4 ===
- Out for Blood: This blood bank worker watches in horror as a man doesn't have the time to wait for a nurse to draw his blood.
- Just a Trim: One woman finds a new reason to stay away from hair driers.
- Move to the Back of the Bus: A delivery man magically survives getting slammed by an oncoming bus.
- Current Events: An ominous article in the newspaper leaves two girls scared out of their minds.

=== Episode 5 ===
- Hit the Nail on the Head: Safety takes a vacation at this construction site.
- Gutterball: You should always watch your hands near the bowling ball dispenser.
- I See Dead People in High Def: Something is very wrong with the TVs in this warehouse.
- He Likes It Hot: Be careful with the wasabi at this sushi restaurant.

=== Episode 6 ===
- Spare Some Change?: A cab full of friends has a run-in with the most aggressive beggar ever.
- Bump in the Night: A group of night hikers comes across a mysterious, crying girl.
- Pull It Through: Plumbers hate using a snake to unclog drains. This plumber really hates it.
- Crazy Laundry: A mental health inmate takes his cues from the movies and escapes in a laundry bin.

=== Episode 7 ===
- Cupid's Arrow: A crossbow range really isn't the best place for a first date.
- Hand-full: A meat-packer learns his lesson about wearing jewelry around giant food processors.
- Cracked Mirror: When cleaning out a dead person's apartment, don't look in the mirrors.
- The Fake I.D.: This girl's I.D. gets cut up, but it's nothing that a little rubbing can't take care of.

=== Episode 8 ===
- Good Cop, Bad Donut: You can usually find a cop eating donuts, you don't usually see a cop coughing them back up.
- The Miracle Worker: Some people can do amazing things when others are in distress. Like walking on water...
- Don't Fall Apart: Liquid nitrogen freezes pretty much anything it touches instantly, even people. Note: This prank was featured in VH1's special "40 Greatest Pranks 2".
- Very Bad Things: While setting up for a bachelor party some guys think they might have killed the stripper.

== Magic X ==
The show was created by Rico de la Vega and Chris Gongora of Magic X. They previously produced the network television special T.H.E.M. - Totally Hidden Extreme Magic, which also used the concept of magic with hidden cameras. Rico and Chris along with fellow Magic X members Cyril Takayama, Justin "Kredible" Willman, and Lisa de la Vega are featured in the show.

== Credits ==
- Host: Jared Padalecki
- Co-executive producers: Rico de la Vega and Chris Gongora
- Producer: Gentry Stanley
- Executive producers: Ashton Kutcher, Jason Goldberg, Karey Burke, Billy Rainey, Lois Curren and Mary L. Aloe
- Associate producers: Ryan Colston
- Consulting producers: Brett Dos Santos
- Supervising producer: Mark Herwick
- Cast: David Minkin, Mark Cirillo, R.J. Cantu, Oscar Torres, Lou Volpe, Arnaud Collery, Lisa De La Vega, Rico De La Vega, Chris Gongora, Michael Grasso, Derek Hughes, Ambria Miscia, Thomas Nealeigh, Rebecca Ocampo, Robert Lyon Rasner, Amro Salama, Cathy Shim, Michael Stellman, Cyril Takayama, Shirley To, Dawson Van Pelt, Luke Van Pelt, Justin "Kredible" Willman, Rob Zabrecky and Daniel Zacapa
- Magic Consultants: David Minkin, Derek Hughes, Robert Lyon Rasner and Michael Stellman
