= Trigger Happy TV =

British hidden camera/practical joke comedy TV series

- Image from the show's title sequence
- Genre: Comedy
- Directed by: Dom Joly; Sam Cadman
- Starring: Dom Joly
- Opening theme: "Connection" by Elastica
- Country of origin: United Kingdom
- Original language: English
- No. of series: 2 plus Christmas specials including 'Greatest Hits' specials
- No. of episodes: 40

Production
- Producers: Dom Joly; Sam Cadman; Tony Lundon
- Running time: 23 minutes
- Production companies: Absolutely Productions; Spirit Media

Original release
- Network: Channel 4
- Release: 14 January 2000 – 28 July 2003
- Network: All 4
- Release: 26 September 2016 – 14 December 2017

Related
- World Shut Your Mouth; Fool Britannia

Trigger Happy TV was a hidden camera/practical joke comedy television series. The original British edition of the show, produced by Absolutely Productions, starred Dom Joly and ran for three series on the British television channel Channel 4 from 2000 to 2003. Joly made a name for himself as the sole star of the show, which he produced and directed with cameraman Sam Cadman. Trigger Happy TV and World Shut Your Mouth, his other major show, would both be categorised as deadpan or "dry humour".

The show returned again featuring Joly, produced by Spirit Media, as a series of shorts on All 4 and for a one-off Christmas special on Channel 4 after 13 years, airing Christmas Eve 2016. A second series of shorts on All 4 followed and a one-off special on E4 in 2017.

In 2025 in an appearance on an episode of Channel 5 gameshow ‘Celebrity Puzzling’ Dom Joly announced he was taking Trigger Happy on tour to celebrate the show’s 25th anniversary.

== Format ==
The show consists of Joly deliberately entering into ludicrous or embarrassing situations in public places, which were filmed surreptitiously by Cadman. Sketches took place in a variety of locations, though most appeared to be filmed on the streets of Central London and Cheltenham.

Unlike most hidden camera shows, many of the scenes in Trigger Happy TV do not revolve around trapping normal people into embarrassing and impossible situations. Instead, he often makes fun of himself rather than others, and many scenes made people stop and either laugh or simply wonder what was going on; the passers-by are never made aware of the fact that they are on television. Such scenes include Joly answering a gigantic novelty mobile phone and shouting at the top of his voice into it (normally in quiet locations like golf courses, cinemas, libraries and parks), a chef chasing an actor in a large rat costume out of a restaurant, and two actors dressed as masked Mexican wrestlers getting into spontaneous fights in grocery stores. Other scenes included people dressed as animals breaking into a fight and the progress of various costumed pedestrians (such as a snail and an old man) across a zebra crossing in London. Joly also often dressed as a Cub Scout, a foreign person with bad English, or a park attendant.

The show does not include a laugh track, instead playing instrumental and sometimes sad music during sketches. Bands such as Eels and The Crocketts have been used several times in the series.

Two series and two Christmas specials of the show were produced in the UK, from 2000 to 2003. Three DVDs were released, containing the "best of" both series and the Christmas specials. Despite the show's popularity over two continents, Joly says he will not make any more in Britain, as his face and voice are now too well known. The comedy was also known for its contrastingly sombre musical soundtrack, which was released commercially. He notes in the booklet of the soundtrack CD for Series 2 "Also Johnny Vaughan ask me why all the music is so sad and not plinky-plonk, happy-clappy cartoon type stuff, 'cos I don't want to be the Big Breakfast, 'nuff said."

A series of 8 short episodes became available on All 4 on 26 September 2016, as well as a Christmas special which aired on Channel 4 on 24 December 2016.

== Recurring sketches ==
- The signature sketch of the series sees Joly innocuously present in a public location, often a place of relative quiet such as an art gallery, a library or an Internet café, when a loud Nokia ring tone sounds. After a moment's pause, he lifts an oversized model of a mobile phone into view and shouts "Hello?!" into it. He then proceeds to yell conversational dialogue about where he is and what he's doing. Apart from an occasion where he was "On a boat in Holland!", this was usually while he slowly exits the area. It almost always concluded with him saying some variation of "Yeah, it's rubbish...ciao!"

The status of this sketch premise as synonymous with the series was reflected in the final episode, where it served as the final sketch. It began with him sitting alone on a bench at a train station, smoking, beneath a sign reading "The End". He looks somewhat downbeat, with the phone resting beside him. In time the familiar ring tone sounds and he lifts the phone only to speak in a low and measured voice "Hello? No... No... I can't talk now, bye." and soon a fade to black.

- A random customer about to enter a grocery store is told by Joly (dressed up in a flamboyant suit, flanked by glamorous women and beneath a celebratory banner) that they are the millionth customer and anything they can get in their shopping trolley in a one-minute "dash" will be free. The customer proceeds to speed through the store filling up their cart while he and the other actors removed the set and quickly left.
- Joly is seen dressed in a stereotype burglar costume and asks a random passerby to aide him in some apparently criminal endeavour. Invariably after completing his "crime" he'd start yelling his joy at the success and implicate the passerby as an accomplice, while departing ("escaping") the scene. One instance saw him shouting from the upstairs window of a house asking a passerby to put a ladder back up for him and hold it while he climbs down (complete with a bag marked "Swag"), upon reaching the bottom he runs away screaming "We burgled the house! Me and him just burgled the house!", leaving the passerby holding the ladder.
- Joly, dressed in authentic costumes, would walk up to people sitting at a table or bench, often outside a restaurant, and offer (usually in a mock-foreign accent and broken English) to perform some form of entertainment, most commonly play a musical instrument, sing or perform a dance. Whether they accepted or refused the offer, he'd proceed to give a performance of terrible quality and, however they reacted, hold out a hand in expectation of a tip. On one occasion, Joly, wearing a porkpie hat and white jumpsuit, walks up to a couple sitting on a bench in a park. Despite no encouragement, he proceeded to do a terrible Morris dance. When finished, he calmly places his hand out as if asking for change.
- Joly is seen in a laundrette with boxer shorts and an undershirt on, and wearing a hockey mask on his face, à la Jason Voorhees. He stuffs a bloody jumpsuit into the washer.
- Outside an incongruous location (such as a pornography shop or public toilet), a random customer is seen to enter and quickly Joly sets up outside in flamboyant suit and wig, holding a microphone, flanked by glamorous women holding champagne, a couple of men with brass horn instruments, photographers, and all beneath a large banner, faced by a television crew. When the customer leaves the shop, fanfare erupts, cameras flash and Joly yells congratulations to the person for being the millionth customer.
- Joly, dressed in a stereotypical hooligan-like outfit including piercings, spiked hair and 'anarchy' facial tattoos, accosts random people in an extremely polite and intellectual manner, often quoting poetry or prose and behaving completely at odds with his rough appearance.
- Joly stands in front of an enormous picture of himself plastered against a wall that says "Don't trust this man!", but still manages to get passersby to talk to him and do things for him. In one memorable sketch, somebody actually comes up to him and asks him for directions.
- In Trafalgar Square, people sit down to have Joly, dressed as a French artist, paint their portrait. Rather than actually painting the portrait, he paints a comical phrase or picture on the canvas and walks away, leaving the customer sitting in their pose. Examples include him painting "I need to sing" before picking up a nearby guitar and strumming away across the square and "Goodbye cruel world" before climbing into the nearby fountain and floating face-down.
- Persons are stopped at random on the street by Joly, accompanied by a cameraman and boom operator, and asked to take a blindfolded taste test of a new foodstuff or drink. Once the person is blindfolded and given a sample in each hand, he and his crew silently but quickly walked away leaving the person standing there. Sometimes, a noticeably different crew replaced the original one.
- Joly is in the process of conducting a streetside interview with a British celebrity, but becomes increasingly distracted before abruptly departing. Distractions took the form of his own dissatisfaction with the job (walked off after expressing it), an ardent fan who kisses him and dares him to chase after her for more (he pauses for a moment then runs off after her), a persistent busker constantly getting in the frame (chases after him having smashed his guitar and threatening to do worse) and his kidnapping right in front of the interviewee by a van of hoodlums.
- Joly, disguised in trench coat, dark glasses and hat plays the role of a KGB spy. He would approach a random member of the public and usually uttered a code word or phrase ("You are red fox?") in an apparent attempt to confirm they were the contact he was supposed to meet, and tried to hand them a briefcase. After Joly leaves without completing the 'drop', his accomplice usually appears, dressed as the person in question (a giant red fox). The most elaborate set up involved an unsuspecting phone-box user becoming the centerpiece of a bizarre money exchange laced with secret codes involving a "nun" and a "doctor".
- Joly, dressed as a Swiss tourist, holding a phrasebook, asks a passerby a question in comical and especially bad broken English, such as "Where may I go to empty my bottom?" (go to the toilet). Some people laugh; others genuinely try to help him.
- Various sketches involving actors in animal costumes copulating, urinating, or violently assaulting others, in the presence of ordinary people. The sketches with animal costumes, especially the violent ones, are arguably second only to the mobile phone sketches as a "signature sketch."
- Other examples were the "___-a-gram" services, wherein Joly delivers an actor in costume to an innocuous business location (often a laundromat) and the actor proceeds to stand in the corner, looking completely forlorn and sighing often after he leaves.
- Assuming the role of a park-keeper, Joly attempts to politely vilify elderly park goers, all-but accusing them of behaving like young hooligans. Each sketch starts with the park-keeper saying that he's been "tipped off" and that someone "matching your description" was acting improperly (setting off fireworks, doing graffiti, joyriding, etc.) When the elderly victim pleads innocence, the park-keeper will sometimes persist, but usually make a highly qualified acceptance, politely by strongly implying he doesn't believe them but as he can't prove anything he'll let them off this time.
- Joly, dressed as a traffic warden, accuses motorists stopped in traffic or at traffic lights of being illegally parked and proceeds to ticket them. In this character (an over-zealous jobsworth essentially), his oft-repeated mantra is "not on my patch, never". Other targets included a street cleaner who was forced to move his wheelbarrow of equipment away from double yellow lines, a bus which Joly attempted to ticket for illegal parking when it is at a bus stop and a taxi, which he himself hailed to a stop.
- Joly and other actors wearing "fat suits" and trying to fit into tight places, such as a telephone booth or narrow alleyway. One memorable example included Joly and another actor in fat suits holding up an entire escalator full of people.
- Joly will walk into a crowded public area (train car, bus stop, etc.) wearing a bright red satin jacket with a red beret and loudly announce that his name is Arron and the location is now under control of the "Guardian Angels". He will usually open his jacket to reveal a matching shirt that reads "Guardian Angels" when making his initial announcement. This is followed by "There will be no violence in this...(trolley, sidewalk)! Now does anybody have a problem with that!"

== Being Dom Joly ==
A spoof documentary about Joly followed the original three series, called Being Dom Joly and produced and written by Joly himself. This aired prior to screenings of Trigger Happy TV in the USA and earned critical acclaim, with one reviewer Bob Croft, for the LA Times, calling Joly "the funniest man in Britain".

== American version ==
A new series of Trigger Happy TV was made for the American market in 2003, for Comedy Central. It retained the original format, but almost all sketches were performed by a cast including Travis Draft and Jerry Minor. A total of 13 episodes were made and broadcast on Comedy Central in the United States, comprising the one series. Recurring sketches included a waitress with a large pepper mill appearing in incongruous places such as a park and offering members of the public fresh ground pepper, and a cheerleader whose inappropriate cheers featured topics such as skin cancer. The series was subsequently broadcast on Channel 4 in the UK, under the title Trigger Happy TV USA. Though Joly did cameo sporadically on the show (he appeared to a greater or lesser extent in 4 episodes), he was very unhappy with the programme and called it "Trigger Happy by numbers". He had a producer credit on the show, but disassociated himself with the project.

The British series 1 and 2 episodes also aired in the US on Comedy Central, but with different music from that used in the UK, and with a few scenes edited out.

== Series overview ==
=== Original series ===
Series	Episodes	Originally released	
Series	Episodes	First released	Last released
1	6	14 January 2000	18 February 2000
2	6	22 January 2001	26 February 2001
3	2	21 December 2001	24 December 2001

=== Trigger Happy ===
Series	Episodes	Originally released
1	10	26 September 2016
2	1	24 December 2016
3	10	16 October 2017

== Home media ==
=== Video ===
Separate "Best of" collections have been released on VHS and DVD for each of the British Series 1, 2 and 3 (Christmas Specials), with each containing an amount of unseen footage. The three individual releases have also been released together, along with "Being Dom Joly" as a box-set entitled "Trigger Happy TV Complete", again on both VHS and DVD, along with unseen footage of "Being..."

All of the British episodes are available to view online in the UK on Channel 4's All 4 service, and available for download from the UK version of iTunes. As of May 2012, there have been no DVD releases of the British episodes as originally aired, and no video releases of the American episodes.

=== YouTube ===
In September 2015, Dead Parrot gained rights to start showing clips and full episodes on their YouTube channel.

=== Soundtrack ===
Three soundtrack CDs have been released, each compiling most of the tracks used in the series.

Series 1

1. Embrace - "All You Good Good People" (Episode 4)
2. The Church - "Under the Milky Way" (Episode 3/6)
3. Babybird - "If You'll Be Mine" (Episode 6)
4. Pulp - "Babies" (Episode 1)
5. The Honey Smugglers - "Listen" (Episode 6)
6. The Beta Band - "Dr Baker" (Episode 1/3)
7. House of Love - "Shine On" (Episode 1)
8. The Waterboys - "Spirit" (Episode 6)
9. Gomez - "Tijuana Lady" (Episode 1/2)
10. Monaco - "What Do You Want from Me?" (Episode 3)
11. Faithless - "Drifting Away" (Episode 1/2/3/4/6)
12. Deus - "HotelLounge (Be the Death of Me)" (Episode 1/3)
13. The Stone Roses - "This Is the One" (Episode 5)
14. Television Personalities - "I Know Where Syd Barrett Lives" (Episode 6)
15. Gene - "Speak to Me Someone" (Episode 5)
16. James - "P.S." (Episode 1)
17. Stereophonics - "Just Looking" (Episode 1)
18. Elastica - "Connection" (Opening/Closing Theme)

Series 2

1. Grant Lee Buffalo - "Jupiter & Teardrop" (Episode 4)
2. Slade - "Everyday" (Episode 3)
3. The Crocketts - "1939 Returning" (Episode 2/6)
4. Laid Back - "Bakerman" (Episode 1/3/4)
5. Mercury Rev - "Holes" (Episode 3)
6. David Gray - "My Oh My" (Episode 3)
7. Grandaddy - "He's Simple, He's Dumb, He's the Pilot." (Episode 1/2/3/4/5/6)
8. Day One - "Ordinary Man" (Episode 4)
9. Super Furry Animals - "Long Gone" (Episode 2)
10. A Flock of Seagulls - "I Ran" (Episode 3)
11. Suede - "Down" (Episode 5)
12. PJ Harvey - "We Float" (Episode 3)
13. Shack - "Streets of Kenny" (Episode 1/2/5)
14. David J - "Stop This City" (Episode 1)
15. Captain Sensible - "Glad It's All Over" (Episode 6)

Series 3 (Christmas Specials and Being Dom Joly)

1. Faithless - "Crazy English Summer" (Christmas Special Part 2)
2. Eskobar - "On a Train" (Christmas Special Part 1/2)
3. Dodgy - "Grassman" (Christmas Special Part 1)
4. The Dandy Warhols - "Get Off" (not included in the show)
5. The Cure - "A Forest" (not included in the show)
6. Therapy? - "Diane" (Christmas Special Part 1)
7. The Psychedelic Furs - "Love My Way" (not included in the show)
8. Nick Drake - "River Man" (Christmas Special Part 1)
9. James - "Next Lover" (Christmas Special Part 1)
10. Starsailor - "Tie Up My Hands" (Christmas Special Part 1)
11. Nick Heyward - "Whistle Down The Wind" (not included in the show)
12. Suede - "Sleeping Pills" (Christmas Special Part 2)
13. Fleetwood Mac - "Need Your Love So Bad" (not included in the show)
14. Men at Work - "Down by the Sea" (Christmas Special Part 1)
15. The Beach Boys - "God Only Knows" (Being Dom Joly)

=== Other songs used in the series ===
The following songs were used in the programme, but did not feature on the soundtrack albums:

- Eels - "Novocaine for the Soul"
- Ryuichi Sakamoto - "Forbidden Colours"
- Gordon Lightfoot - "If You Could Read My Mind"
- Paul McCartney and Wings - "Nineteen Hundred and Eighty-Five"
