= Fool Britannia =

British TV series or programme

- Genre: Hidden camera
- Directed by: Paul Young
- Starring: Dom Joly
- Theme music composer: Augustin Bousfield
- Country of origin: United Kingdom
- Original language: English
- No. of series: 2
- No. of episodes: 14 (inc. 1 special)

Production
- Executive producer: Lee Connolly
- Producer: Greg Bower
- Editors: Joe Chappell; Justin James; Michael Wolf
- Running time: 30 minutes (inc. adverts)
- Production company: ITV Studios

Original release
- Network: ITV
- Release: 1 September 2012 – 9 November 2013

Fool Britannia is a hidden camera sketch series which aired from 1 September 2012 to 9 November 2013 on ITV, and stars Dom Joly as he surprises members of the public with pranks. The first series aired for eight episodes.

The second series began airing on 5 October 2013 and consisted of six episodes.

== Episodes ==
=== Series ===
Series	Start date	End date	Episodes
1	1 September 2012	20 October 2012	8
2	5 October 2013	9 November 2013	6

=== Specials ===
Show	Original air date
Text Santa Special	21 December 2012
