= Dom Joly =

British comedian and writer (born 1967)

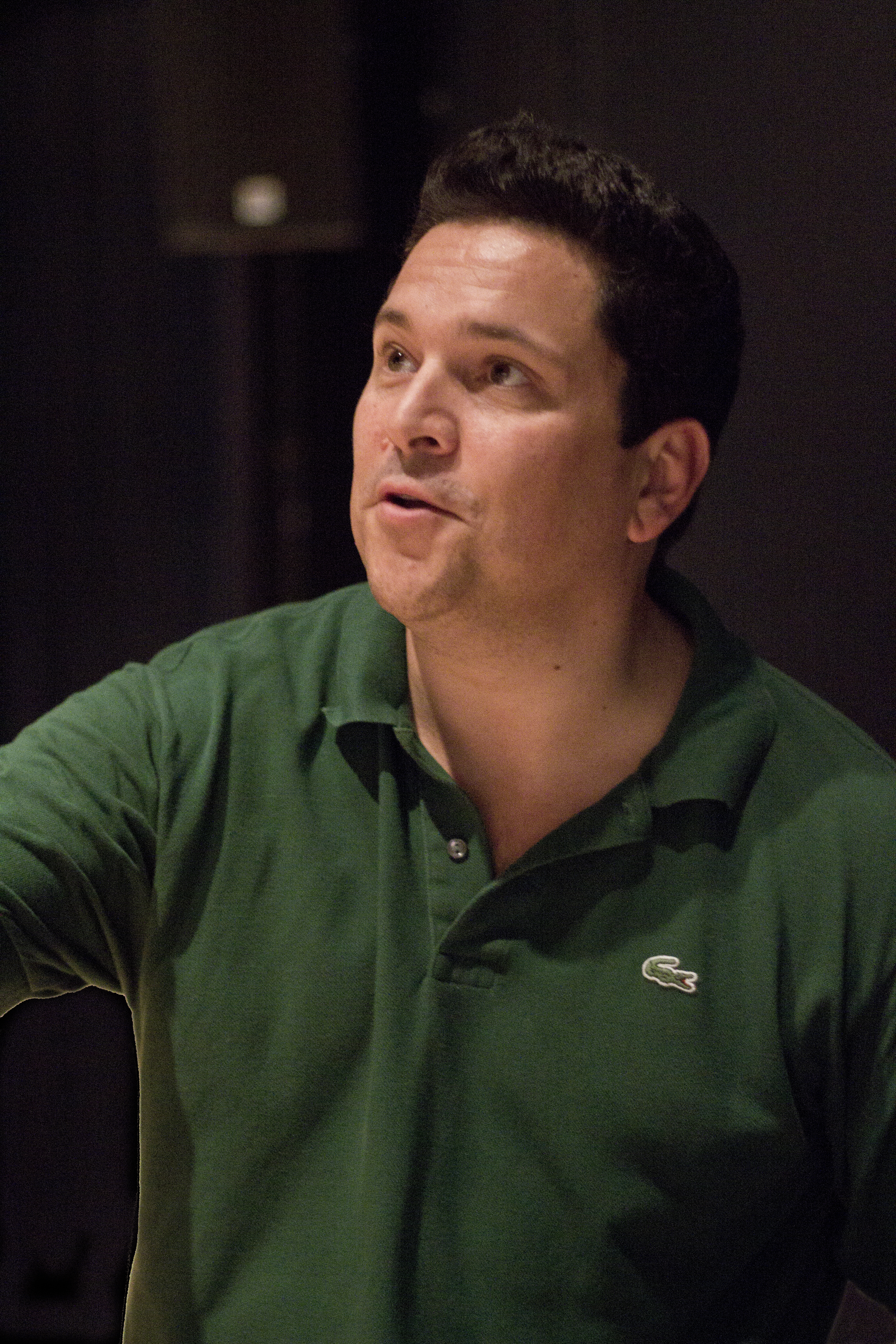
- Joly in May 2011
- Born: Dominic John Joly; 15 November 1967 (age 58); Beirut, Lebanon
- Spouse: Stacey MacDougall
- Children: 2

Comedy career
- Years active: 1999–present
- Medium: Television, books, stand-up
- Genres: Character comedy, improvisational comedy, physical comedy

Dominic John Romulus Joly (/ˈdʒɒli/; born 15 November 1967) is an English comedian and writer. He is best known as the star of Trigger Happy TV (2000–2003), a hidden camera prank show that was broadcast in over 70 countries.

== Early life ==
Dominic John Romulus Joly was born in Beirut on 15 November 1967, to British parents John Joly and his second wife, Yvonne. John Joly, a pilot with the Fleet Air Arm during the Second World War, owned banking, insurance and shipping agency Henry Heald & Co., which had been managed, and later bought, by Joly's great-grandfather. The family business is now run by Joly's sister. Joly's parents were "quite detached" and he was raised with a nanny; his parents separated when Joly was 18, and for 20 years he had little contact with his father, reconciling in his old age prior to the latter's death in 2011. He has a half-brother and two half-sisters resident in Lebanon and England, to whom he is not close.

Joly attended Brummana High School in Lebanon. He then moved to England, where he was educated at Dragon School in Oxford and Haileybury College near Hertford. He later attended the School of Oriental and African Studies at the University of London. He studied for a degree in politics. Joly speaks Arabic, Czech and French in addition to English.

In 2018, Joly told the Sunday People that when he was at school in Beirut in the 1970s a fellow pupil brought a severed head to show his class.

== Career ==
After university, Joly was a diplomat, based in Prague.

=== Television ===
==== Trigger Happy TV ====
The original series ran for two series on Channel 4 from 2000 to 2003.

In 2003, a new series of Trigger Happy TV was made for an American audience with an altered format that featured a band of different comedians who performed skits without Joly although he cameoed. Joly was not happy with the US version.

Following the success of Trigger Happy TV on Channel 4, Joly was secured by the BBC for a rumoured £5 million.

==== This is Dom Joly ====
This is Dom Joly was a spoof chat show presented by Dom Joly, originally shown on BBC Three in 2003.

==== World Shut Your Mouth ====
World Shut Your Mouth was a hidden camera television series starring Joly. It ran on Friday nights in 2005 on BBC One.

==== Dom Joly's Happy Hour ====
In this series which aired in 2006, Joly and his partner Peter Wilkins travelled the world and tried the unique alcoholic beverages of each country. It ran on Sky One.

==== Made in Britain ====
In 2009, Joly fronted a show titled Made in Britain, shown on the Blighty channel in the UK.

==== Fool Britannia ====
In 2012–13, Joly made two series of Fool Britannia, a hidden camera show that aired on Saturday evenings on ITV1.

==== Celebrity Island with Bear Grylls ====
In 2016, Joly was marooned on a desert island for two weeks for Celebrity Island with Bear Grylls.

=== Pilgrimage ===
In 2020, Joly walked the Sultans Trail from Belgrade to Istanbul for the BBC One series Pilgrimage.

=== Writing ===
Joly was a columnist for The Independent on Sunday from 2003 until the paper closed in 2016.

He was thought to be the writer of a spoof column in The Independent and then i called "Cooper Brown: He's out there", and later confirmed in his autobiography that this was the case. The column was presented as the work of an American character named Cooper Brown and revolves around his putative adventures as "a garrulous American showbiz type".

Joly was a special correspondent for the Independent at the 2008 Summer Olympics in Beijing. While in Beijing, he also appeared daily on the Drive programme on Five Live.

In 2010, Joly published a travel book called The Dark Tourist: Sightseeing in the World's Most Unlikely Holiday Destinations, investigating dark tourism. In the book Joly travels to places that witnessed great tragedy and death, including Chernobyl, which he visited on 4 May 2009; his childhood home of Lebanon; North Korea; various spots in the United States including locations of famous assassinations; the Killing Fields of Cambodia; and Iran for a skiing holiday. The book was published on 2 September 2010 in the UK.

Joly published his second travel book, Scary Monsters and Super Creeps, in 2012. In the book, he travels the world in search of six cryptids such as Bigfoot and the Yeti.

In 2019, Joly published the travel book The Hezbollah Hiking Club, in which he documented his walk across Lebanon with two friends.

In 2023, Joly published a book The Conspiracy Tourist, in which he travels the world investigating conspiracy theories and the people who believe them including QAnon, hunting for UFOs in Roswell, chasing Alex Jones of Infowars around Austin, trying to prove that Finland exists and taking a flat-earther to the edge of the world.

=== Political career ===
In the 1997 general election, Joly stood in Kensington and Chelsea against Alan Clark. Hiring out hundreds of teddy bear costumes, he staged mock protests at Westminster and came fifth out of nine candidates, receiving 218 votes (0.6%).

=== Podcast ===
On 29 June 2018, Joly released the first episode of his comedy podcast, Earworm. In 2020 the second series of the podcast was released by Audible.

== Personal life ==
Joly is married to Canadian graphic designer Stacey MacDougall. Having lived in the Notting Hill area of London, the two later sold their apartment to novelist Salman Rushdie and bought a property in Gloucestershire to raise their children there.

Joly has spoken about his struggles with anxiety and depression.
