= DreadClub: Vampire's Verdict =

2024 American AI-generated animated film

- Directed by: Hooroo Jackson
- Release date: July 26, 2024
- Running time: 87 minutes
- Country: United States
- Language: English
- Budget: $405

DreadClub: Vampire's Verdict is a 2024 American animated film directed by Hooroo Jackson. It is the first AI animated feature film and the first AI anime feature film. It premiered on July 3, 2024 and was released on July 26, 2024 on Prime Video, receiving a Blu-ray release on August 31, 2024.

== Premise ==
Sophomore Betty Gray's romance with Duchamps De Ve, the leader of the banned occult group Dread Club, spirals out of control when a rival from his past accuses him of being a vampire. As Duchamps fights to clear his name in court, Betty must race to prove his innocence, while facing an onslaught of hate from those who brand him as a monster.

== Production ==
The film was made entirely by Jackson, directing the film for $405 between February and July 2024 using only AI technology for sound, music, performances, imagery and animation, using AI as a writing partner. Several sequences utilized AI editing with LLM-dictated paper edits.

Jackson documented the production in a self-published ebook, Artificial Imagination: The Making of "DreadClub" (2024). The book presents his LLM prompts during the six-month production of the film.

== Release ==
The film was released July 26, 2024.

== Reception ==
Rotten Tomatoes lists three professional reviews, two of which are positive. Martin Carr wrote, "DreadClub: Vampire's Verdict is an animated A.I. feature film that takes movie making to another level. Writer-director Hooroo Jackson has fashioned something unique with this Gothic horror romance, that not only feels cinematic, but proves to be truly engaging." Bobby LePire of Film Threat praised the film, writing, "This is an intriguing first step into the potential of artificial intelligence in filmmaking. More importantly, it highlights Jackson as a talented filmmaker with style." William Schwartz of Book & Film Globe criticized the film’s storytelling and pace, stating, "The characters never, ever stop talking. Not even to take a breath." Film critic Ronak Kotecha also noted the excessive dialog, and says "Odd detours to the main story detract from the film somewhat while the absence of actual flesh-eating vampires is a mystery. Yet, on the whole, the viewer is assured of an engaging pageant of myth, mystery and melodrama."
