= Derek Lee Nixon =

American actor

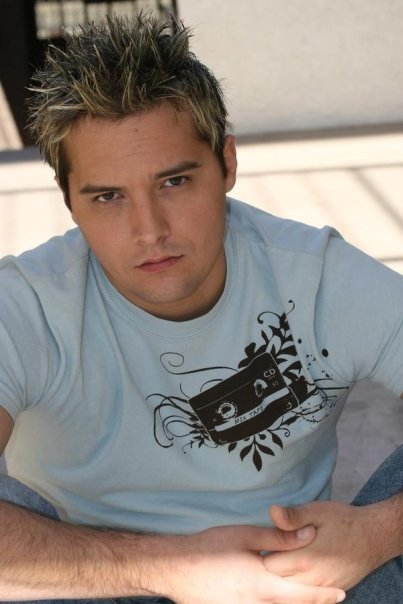
- Born: Derek Lee Nixon; April 13, 1983 (age 43); San Antonio, Texas, US
- Occupations: Actor, Film Producer
- Website: http://www.aristarfilm.com

Derek Lee Nixon is an American actor and film producer. Born and raised in San Antonio, Texas, he gained notoriety in 2002 after starring in Mary-Kate and Ashley Olsen's, When in Rome. He has also appeared in The Jerk Theory (with Tom Arnold, Jenna Dewan-Tatum, Josh Henderson); Butcher Boys, from Kim Henkel, the creator of Texas Chainsaw Massacre; and Outrage (with Michael Madsen, Natasha Lyonne, and Michael Berryman). He wrote, produced and starred in Hallettsville (with Gary Busey), beginning his career behind the camera.

== Early life ==
Derek Lee Nixon was born in San Antonio, Texas. He graduated from Churchill High School in 2001. Nixon began his acting career at the age of 6, landing his first job in a PSA (Public Service Announcement) for the Department of Public Safety. From ages 6 to 14, Nixon worked on many regional commercials including Six Flags Fiesta Texas, San Antonio Hispanic Chamber of Commerce, and Southwestern Bell. National commercials including Ford Motor Company, SeaWorld and DARE. Television credits included Spanish Club House with actresses Hilary Duff and Haylie Duff, Kaleidoscope, Boundaries, and America's Most Wanted. This led to Nixon moving to Los Angeles, California at the age of 18.

=== School ===
He attended Winston Churchill High School in San Antonio, Texas, 2001

=== Present life ===
Nixon moved back to Texas in 2006 and resides in Bulverde, Texas. Nixon continues developing and producing primarily family feature films. Most recently completing a series of the Family, Island, Dolphin Features, Dolphin Kick (Netflix 2019), Dolphin Island (Affirm/PureFlix, 2021) and Saving Bimini (release date unknown). During the COVID-19 pandemic, Nixon purchased Cryptocurrency and through fascination in blockchain technology began developing a DAO for democratizing and decentralizing feature film through blockchain due to transparency and P2P connectivity. Crypto Films was born in April 2024 with a launch as soon as September 2024. Nixon has five children: Tyler Jade Nixon (actress, starred in Dolphin Kick and Dolphin Island), Aalyvia Nixon, Kannon Nixon, Axle Nixon and Ari Nixon.

=== Career ===
Nixon's first network television credit was a role in the 1999 airing of the America's Most Wanted episode titled "The Jason Crawford Killing". In 2002, he was cast as Ryan in Mary-Kate and Ashley's When in Rome. Nixon and two others in 2005 developed a horror film Hallettsville in which Nixon played the title character with actor Gary Busey; DVD release January 2009. In January 2007 Nixon produced and starred in a sci-fi thriller, The Lights, directed by John M. Sjogren, where he played the lead character, with Ozzy Lusth from Survivor and Joe Estevez. In April 2007, Nixon teamed up with director Ace Cruz and co-produced and starred in Outrage, a thriller with actors Michael Madsen, Natasha Lyonne and Michael Berryman. Nixon signed onto the teen comedy The Jerk Theory; he stars alongside Josh Henderson, Jenna Dewan, and Tom Arnold, it was released February 7, 2009. Nixon produced and starred in the multi award-winning film A Schizophrenic Love Story alongside Academy Award nominee Bruce Davison in 2010.

Nixon made his directorial debut in 2011 with the horror–comedy spoof Supernatural Activity with a release date in October 2012 and also starring in Butcher Boys, working with horror writer Kim Henkel the same year. Nixon produced Ya'Ke Smith's first feature film WOLF which premiered in 2012 at the SXSW Film Festival and won several other festivals including Dallas International Film Festival and Little Rock Film Festival's best picture awards. He also produced with Dave Sheridan The Walking Dead parody The Walking Deceased, released 2015 as a Netflix Premiere. Nixon was the producer on Jeffrey Reddick's (creator of the Final Destination franchise) feature film Dead Awake, which was released theatrically May 15, 2017. In 2016 Nixon created the Dolphin/Island/Family/Adventure slate of films, shooting on location in the Bahamas. Travis McCoy and Nixon started with Dolphin Kick which stars Nixon's daughter (Tyler Jade Nixon and Axle McCoy as brother and sister). Dolphin Kick was released on all home video, VOD and DVD platforms January 20, 2019 and an Official Netflix Exclusive June 5, 2019. Nixon Produced Round of Your Life in theaters starting June 21, 2019 and then to Showtime. In January 2020 Dolphin Island, the second of the Dolphin Features went into production and was released on Sony's faith platform Pureflix in March 2021, co-produced by Shaked Berenson and Financed Internationally by Daro Films.

Crypto Films was founded as a DAO for feature films in all genre of film. Its developers' stated aim is to assist in democratizing and decentralizing the feature film industry, and allowing anyone to participate.

== Filmography ==
| Year | Title | Role | Notes |
|---|---|---|---|
| 1999 | America's Most Wanted | Aaron | TV series |
| 2000 | Boundaries | Host | Short |
| 2001 | The Andy Dick Show | Various Characters | TV series |
| 2002 | When in Rome | Ryan Hammond | |
| 2003 | Do Over | Derek | TV series |
| 2004 | Boston Public | Steve | TV series |
| 2006 | Hallettsville | Tyler Jensen | |
| 2007 | The Lights | Brad Taylor | |
| 2008 | The Jerk Theory | Chester | |
| 2009 | Be My Teacher | Evan | |
| 2009 | Outrage | Jack Cratton | |
| 2011 | Killer School Girls from Outer Space | Deputy | |
| 2012 | Butcher Boys | Benny | |
