= Affion Crockett =

American comedian and actor

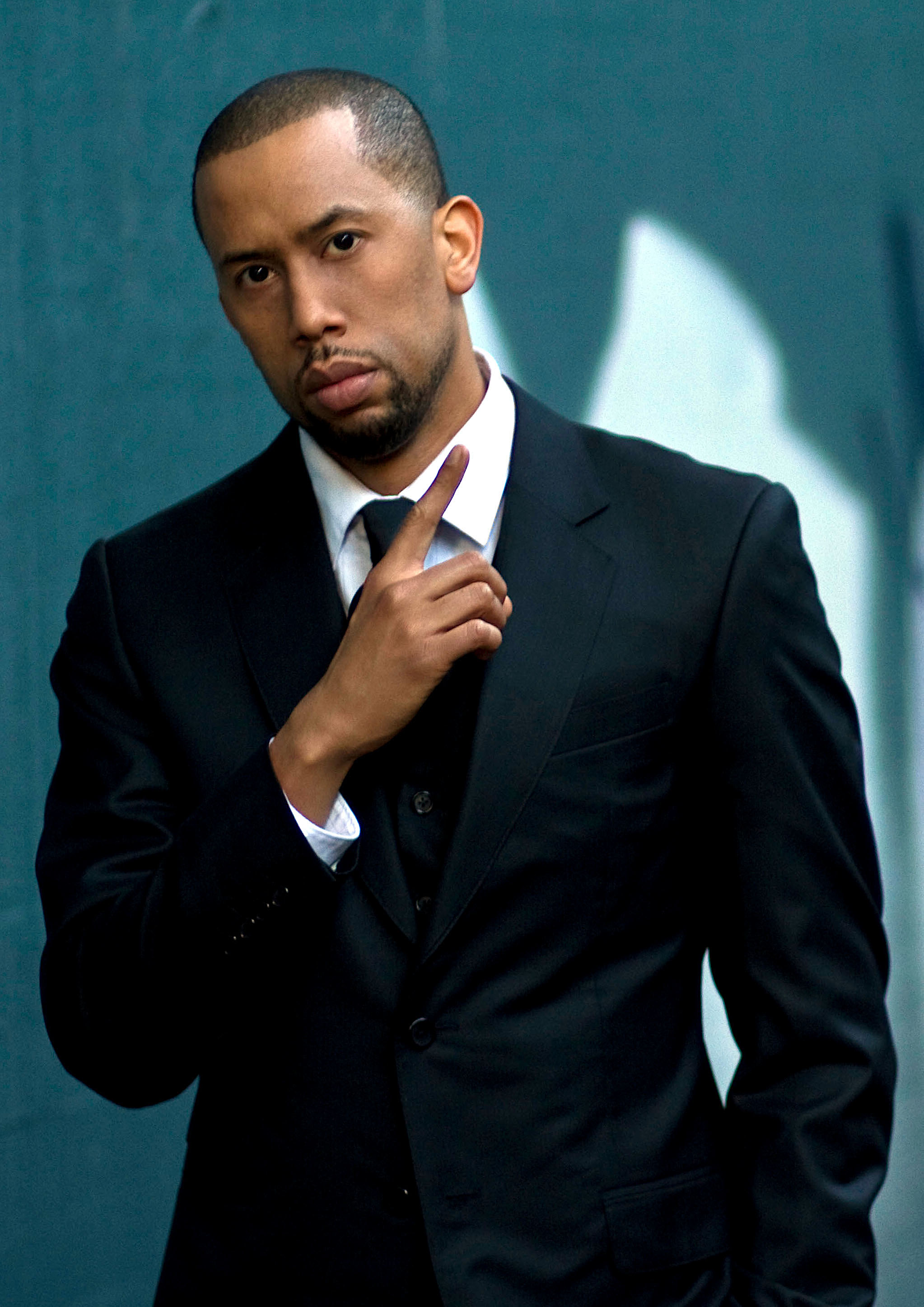
- Born: Fayetteville, North Carolina, U.S.
- Occupations: Actor, comedian
- Years active: 1995–present
- Height: 6 ft 1 in (185 cm)
- Website: AffionCrockett.com

Affion Crockett is an American actor and comedian who appeared on Black-ish and Curb Your Enthusiasm, and was the producer and star of the Fox series In the Flow with Affion Crockett.

== Early life ==
Crockett was a US Army brat raised in Germany and Fayetteville, North Carolina and is a Trinbagonian.

He graduated from Fayetteville State University, with a bachelor's degree in business.

== Career ==
Crockett first appeared on HBO's Def Comedy Jam in 1996, demonstrating his impressions and physical comedy. He was a cast member of the game show Wild 'n Out, starring Nick Cannon. He has appeared on Curb Your Enthusiasm, Black-ish, co-starred in the films A Haunted House 1 & 2 with Marlon Wayans, Welcome Home Roscoe Jenkins with Martin Lawrence, Soul Men with Samuel L. Jackson and Bernie Mac, The Wedding Ringer with Kevin Hart and Josh Gad, and Pixels with Adam Sandler. In 2016, Crockett was a contestant playing for charity, on a season 3 episode of the game show Idiotest.

Crockett starred in and produced his own sketch comedy show for Fox titled In the Flow with Affion Crockett, which was executive produced by Jamie Foxx. He wrote, produced, and rapped on his debut comedy album, Watch the Clone.

He hosted a reunion special for the TV series Martin titled Martin: The Reunion that aired June 16, 2022 on BET+.

Crockett wrote, produced, financed and starred in his own feature film A Hip Hop Story, co-starring Cedric The Entertainer, Lil Rel Howery, Fredro Starr, and Wayne Brady. The film is a Coming to America-style satirical look back on the culture of hip hop starting from the Bronx up to present.

== Filmography ==
=== Film ===
Year	Title	Role	Notes
2000	Charlie's Angels	Dancer	
2002	For the Love of Money	Slim	
2004	Compton Cowboy	Thug #1	Short
2005	Miss Congeniality 2: Armed and Fabulous	Attendant #2	
2005	Matthew 26:17	Nathanael	
2006	Dead & Deader	Private Connery	TV movie
2007	Universal Remote	Various	
2007	Young Cesar	-	
2007	07-07-07	Himself	Video
2008	Welcome Home Roscoe Jenkins	Dayquan	
2008	Never Back Down	Beatdown DJ	
2008	Bar Starz	TJ Fykus	
2008	Soul Men	Lester	
2008	Swipe	Marcus	Short
2009	Blokhedz Mission G Animated Web Series	Flash	Short
2009	Dance Flick	A-Con	
2009	The Substitute for Love	Aaron	Short
2009	Endless Bummer	Coco	
2010	Freaknik: The Musical	Various Voices (voice)	TV movie
2010	For (Stuffed) Colored Girls	Himself	Short
2011	Dance Fu	Julius Ho	
2012	This Means War	Video Clerk	
2012	Mac & Devin Go to High School	Captain Kush	
2013	A Haunted House	Cousin Ray-Ray	
2013	Baggage Claim	Cedric	
2014	A Haunted House 2	Cousin Ray-Ray	
2014	School Dance	Coach Fontaine	
2015	The Wedding Ringer	Reggie/Drysdale	
2015	Pixels	Sergeant Dylan Cohan	
2015	DeTour	Dominic	TV movie
2016	Fifty Shades of Black	Eli	
2018	A Boy. A Girl. A Dream.	Himself	
2018	NBA	Fantasy League Bully	Short
2019	Same Difference	Todd	
2019	Always a Bridesmaid	Dawson	
2019	Undercover Brother 2	Sarcastic Brother	
2019	Twas the Chaos before Christmas	Ed Russell	TV movie
2020	The Binge	Boomer	
2020	Enjoy the Disco	Speed Dating Host	Short
2024	A Hip Hop Story	Various	
2024	Beverly Hills Cop: Axel F	Country Club Valet	

=== Television ===
Year	Title	Role	Notes
1996	Def Comedy Jam	Himself	Episode: "Episode 2.7"
1999	Soul Train	Aflexx	Episode: "Destiny's Child/Christina Aguilera/Coko"
2001	Curb Your Enthusiasm	Car Customer #2	Episode: "The Car Salesman"
2001	The District	Ernie Flint	Episode: "Lost and Found"
2002	That Was Then	Guy Smith	Episode: "A Rock and a Head Case"
2002	Rocket Power	Spectator (voice)	Episode: "Beach Boyz and a Girl/X-treme Ideas"
2003	NYPD Blue	Todd Grady	Episode: "Off the Wall"
2003	American Dream	All-Star #2	Episode: "And Promises to Keep"
2003	Cedric the Entertainer Presents	Himself	Episode: "Episode 1.16"
2004	Married to the Kellys	Andrew	Episode: "Whose Pants Are Smarter?"
2005-07; 2018; 2020–21; 2023	Wild 'n Out	Himself	Main Cast: Season 1–4, 15; Guest: Season 11, 20
2006	CSI: NY	Carter England	Episode: "Super Men"
2006-10	The Boondocks	Additional Voices (voice)	Guest: 1 & 3, Recurring Cast: Season 2
2007	Nick Cannon Presents: Short Circuitz	Himself	Main Cast
2008	Under One Roof	Dan Ewing	Episode: "Get Rich... Or Fry Tryin'"
2008	The Miley and Mandy Show	Himself	Episode: "M&M Cru Final Dance Battle: Cyrus Blaine Seacrest Tatum"
2009	Black to the Future	Himself	Episode: "Hour 4: The 00s"
2010	The Key of Awesome	Jay-Z	Episode: "Lebron is Gone"
2010	The League	Randall	Episode: "The Tie"
2011	In the Flow with Affion Crockett	Himself/Host	Main Host
2011	Reed Between the Lines	Warren	Episode: "Let's Talk About Boundaries"
2011	Robot Chicken	Additional Voices (voice)	Recurring Cast: Season 5
2012	Just for Laughs: All-Access	Himself	Episode: "Episode #4.6"
2012	Black Dynamite	Joe Jackson (voice)	Episode: "Just Beat It or Jackson Five Across Yo' Eyes"
2012	Sketchy	-	Episode: "ObaMMA"
2013	American Dad!	U People Searcher (voice)	Episode: "Max Jets"
2013	Second Generation Wayans	Himself	Episode: "Independence Day"
2014	The Rebels	Lamont Slice	Episode: "Pilot"
2014	Family Guy	Far-Away Black Man/Upbeat Black Kid (voice)	Episode: "Secondhand Spoke"
2014	Chozen	Additional Voices (voice)	Episode: "The Battle of Broken Spear"
2015	The Comedians	Ron Murray	Episode: "Orange You the New Black Guy"
2016	TripTank	Nasty D/Caller (voice)	Episode: "The D.O.N.G."
2016	Brad Neely's Harg Nallin' Sclopio Peepio	Additional Voices (voice)	Main Cast
2017	Andiamo!	Himself	Episode: "Negril, Jamaica"
2017	Face Value	Himself/Team Captain	Episode: "Essence Atkins v Affion Crockett"
2017	Jeff & Some Aliens	Jesse/Drake (voice)	Episode: "Jeff & Some Preteen Girls"
2017	Legends of Chamberlain Heights	The Father (voice)	Episode: "My Father the Zero"
2017	The Guest Book	Darnell	Episode: "Story Eight"
2017	Pickle and Peanut	D-Stixx	Episode: "Mobile Aquarium; Shaving Primate Ryan"
2017-18	Hip Hop Squares	Himself/Panelist	Recurring Panelist: Season 3-5
2017-20	Black-ish	T Will	Guest Cast: Season 3 & 7
2017-21	Bronzeville	Various Roles	Recurring Guest
2018	Laugh Factory	Himself	Episode: "Affion Crockett: Olympic Skills"
2018	Black Card Revoked	Himself	Episode: "LisaRaye, Affion Crockett, K. Dubb"
2018	Comedians and Cocktails	Himself	Episode: "The Hustle" & "Cheating Champs"
2018	Best.Worst.Weekend.Ever.	Jerry the Comic Cop	Episode: "Issue 1"
2019	Sherman's Showcase	Himself	Episode: "Enemies" & "Ray J's Showcase"
2020	Superstore	Tommy	Episode: "Carol's Back"
2021	A Black Lady Sketch Show	A. N*gga	Episode: "If I'm Paying These Chili's Prices, You Cannot Taste My Steak!"
2021-23	Celebrity Game Face	Himself/Contestant	Guest Cast: Season 2 & 4
2022	Phat Tuesdays: The Era Of Hip Hop Comedy	Himself	Main Guest
2022	So Dumb It's Criminal: Hosted by Snoop Dogg	Himself	Episode: "Hit and Run, Just for Fun"
2022	Urban Eats and Treats	Himself	Episode: "Affion Crockett"
2022	Cardi Tries	Himself	Episode: "Cardi Tries Survival"
2022	A Workplace Comedy	Affion Jenkins	Episode: "Catchphrases"
2022	Welcome to Flatch	Julius	Episode: "The Devil's Backbone"
2022	What We Do in the Shadows	Richie Suck	Episode: "The Grand Opening"
2022	First Wives Club	Tyrell	Recurring Cast: Season 3
2023	Celebrity Squares	Himself/Contestant	Recurring Guest
2023	The Wonder Years	Marvin	Episode: "One Small Step"
2023	Next at the Kennedy Center	Himself	Episode: "Robert Glasper's Black Radio"
2024	After Midnight	Himself	Episode: "Trevor Wallace/London Hughes/Affion Crockett"
2024	Good Times: Black Again	Additional Voices (voice)	Recurring Cast

=== Documentary ===
Year	Title	Role
2007	Battle for the Crown	Himself
2010	Graffiti Verite' 10: Hip-Hop Dance	Himself

=== Video game ===
Year	Title	Role
2004	EverQuest II	(voice)
2005	EverQuest II: Desert of Flames	(voice)
2006	Saints Row	Stilwater's Resident (voice)
