= Naken =

2000 Swedish comedy film

- Directed by: Torkel Knutsson; Mårten Knutsson
- Written by: Torkel Knutsson; Mårten Knutsson
- Produced by: Torkel Knutsson; Mårten Knutsson; Håkan Bjerking
- Starring: Henrik Norberg; Lisa Kock; Martin Forsström
- Cinematography: Jörgen Brennicke; Eric Maddison
- Edited by: Jonas Smensgård
- Music by: Jon Rekdal
- Production company: Pratfilm
- Distributed by: Scanbox Sweden; United International Pictures
- Release date: December 8, 2000
- Running time: 98 minutes
- Country: Sweden
- Language: Swedish

Naken is a 2000 Swedish comedy film written and directed by Torkel and Mårten Knutsson. It stars Henrik Norberg as a naked man who is caught in a time loop on the day of his wedding.

== Plot ==
Anders, a carefree young man working in an advertising agency, finds himself unexpectedly the center of attention when his boss’s daughter, intrigued by his charm, becomes interested in him. They soon begin planning their wedding.

On the night before the big day, Anders attends a bachelor party that his colleague, Pierre, is in charge of organizing. Pierre, who harbors jealousy toward Anders, secretly envies his success and plans to disrupt the wedding. At the party, Pierre encourages Anders to drink heavily, secretly documents embarrassing moments, and leaves him in a compromising situation as a prank.

The next morning, Anders wakes up disoriented, finding himself naked in an elevator in a strange building with no memory of how he got there, and only a couple of hours left before his wedding. With his clothes missing and feeling confused, he realizes that something has gone horribly wrong.

What follows is a strange and bewildering pattern, every day begins the same way, Anders wakes up in the elevator, disoriented and missing his belongings. As he attempts to piece together the reason for his predicament, the day repeats itself, and he becomes stuck in a time loop. Over time, Anders learns from his experiences, growing more determined and resourceful with each new day, until he eventually manages to navigate the challenges and make it to the wedding.

== Cast ==
- Henrik Norberg as Anders (Stig Elvis) Karlsson
- Lisa Kock as Maria (Matilda) Märtelbom
- Martin Forsström as Pierre
- Anna Järphammar as Pernilla, Pierres partner
- Dan Malmer as Matte
- Ingela Sahlin as Vivianne Märtelbom, Marias mother
- Lars G. Holmström as K.G. Märtelbom, Marias father
- Marga Pettersson as Eva Karlsson, Anders mother
- Tommy Johnson as Stig Karlsson, Anders father
- Victoria Silvstedt as Rosita

== Production ==
During filming, the crew was almost struck by a car whose driver had fallen asleep.

== Release ==
To promote the film, the Knutsson brothers appeared naked at the Cannes Film Festival, after which they were arrested.

== Reception ==
Naken received negative reviews in Sweden. Jens Peterson of Aftonbladet called it a poor copy of Groundhog Day that is not even "so bad it's good".

== Remake ==
In 2017, Netflix released an English-language, American remake starring Marlon Wayans and Regina Hall. Michael Tiddes directed the movie. Shooting took place in Charleston, South Carolina.

== See also ==
- List of films featuring time loops
