= Michael Tiddes =

American film director and producer

- Born: October 30, 1975 (age 50); Ridgewood, NJ
- Occupations: Film, director, producer, screenwriter
- Years active: 2007–present

Michael Tiddes is an American filmmaker, best known for directing A Haunted House, A Haunted House 2, and Scary Movie.

== Career ==
In 2013, Tiddes made his feature film directing debut with the horror comedy film A Haunted House, based on the script by Marlon Wayans and Rick Alvarez. The film was released domestically on January 11, 2013 by Open Road Films, and grossed more than $60 million with a budget of just $2.5 million.

In 2014, Tiddes directed the sequel to his first film, A Haunted House 2, based on the script by Wayans and Alvarez. The film was released domestically on April 18, 2014 by Open Road, grossing $24 million with a budget of just $4 million.

Tiddes directed another spoof film, Fifty Shades of Black, again scripted by Wayans and Alvarez. The film was released on January 29, 2016 by Open Road.

In late 2024, Tiddes was hired to direct the Wayans-led Scary Movie. The film will serve as a "rebooquel" for the Scary Movie franchise and is the first film in the series with the involvement of the Wayans family since Scary Movie 2 in 2001. The film was released theatrically on June 5, 2026.

=== Future projects ===
In July 2014, Tiddes was hired to direct an action-comedy film Diablo Run based on the 2013 Black List script by Evan and Shea Mirzai, which Mark Canton would produce through his Atmosphere Entertainment along with David Hopwood and Matthew Einstein. Later in November 2014, Voltage Pictures came on board to finance the film, while Voltage's Craig Flores would also produce the film.

== Filmography ==
=== Feature film ===
Year	Title	Director	Producer
2013	A Haunted House	Yes	Co-producer
2014	A Haunted House 2	Yes	Co-producer
2016	Fifty Shades of Black	Yes	Co-executive
2017	Naked	Yes	Co-executive
2019	Sextuplets	Yes	Executive
2024	Half Baked: Totally High	Yes	No
2026	Scary Movie	Yes	No

=== Short film ===
Year	Title	Director	Executive Producer	Writer
2007	Crawl Space	Yes	Yes	Yes
2015	#DreamRideLA	Yes	Yes	No

=== Television ===
Year	Title	Notes
2010	Fred	Episode "The Babysitter's a Vampire- Official Music Video" (Also writer)
2011	In the Flow with Affion Crockett	6 episodes
2013	The Burn with Jeff Ross	4 episodes
2025	Laugh It Forward	5 episodes (Also executive producer)
