= The Walking Deceased =

- Theatrical release poster
- Directed by: Scott Dow
- Written by: Tim Ogletree
- Produced by: Derek Lee Nixon; Kurt Wehner; Philip Marlatt; Todd Slater; Francis Casanova; Tim Ogletree; Dave Sheridan
- Starring: Tim Ogletree; Joey Oglesby; Dave Sheridan; Troy Ogletree; Sophia Taylor Ali; Danielle Garcia; Andrew Pozza; Mason Dakota Galyon
- Cinematography: Shaun Hart
- Edited by: Brett Houston; Jordan Harris
- Music by: Omer Ben-Zvi
- Production companies: Aristar Entertainment; Sheridanscope
- Distributed by: ARC Entertainment
- Release date: March 15, 2015 (WalkerStalkerCon)
- Running time: 88 minutes
- Country: United States
- Language: English

The Walking Deceased (originally titled Walking with the Dead) is a 2015 American comedy horror film directed by Scott Dow and written by Tim Ogletree. It stars Ogletree, Joey Oglesby, Dave Sheridan, Troy Ogletree, Sophie Taylor Ali, Danielle Garcia, Andrew Pozza, and Mason Dakota Galyon as survivors of a zombie apocalypse who attempt to locate a safe haven.

== Plot ==
A zombie outbreak is caused by a sushi chef not washing his hands before preparing a meal, gloveless, for homeless dumpster-divers.

29 days later in a hospital, a zombie named Romeo thinks to himself how zombies are slowly regaining humanity. He evades survivors Chicago (who is looking for porn) and Green Bay, who meets idiotic Sheriff Lincoln (Dave Sheridan), who has woken from a coma; his son Chris accidentally hits him with a baseball, making him misremember Chris' name. After learning LinkedIn is what's left of the internet, Lincoln decides to search for his family; Green Bay and Chicago wish him luck, revealing their group resides in the mall. Lincoln mistakes a child and her father for "clever zombies", killing them and taking their van. Romeo notices an attractive girl named Brooklyn with Green Bay and Chicago, deciding to follow her. Green Bay likes Brooklyn as well, but is too stupid to realize she hates him. Elsewhere, Super Survivor is taking out zombies.

Lincoln investigates his home, finding a note from his son; they've taken shelter at his wife's workplace, a strip club. He finds Chris continued running the establishment (but is now foul mouthed). Due to stupid patrons (a parody of Shaun and Ed), a zombie bites Lincoln's wife Barbie, whom Chris kills. They head to the mall, meeting other survivors: Harlem (Brooklyn's sister, whose thoughts appear as texts) and Darnell (who thinks his toy crossbow is real, and talks about rumors). Romeo arrives as well, followed by other zombies; he saves Brooklyn, who finds him attractive, while Darnell takes out the zombies. The group reorganizes, with Lincoln and Chicago both declaring themselves leader of the "di-archy"; they order the group to pack up to head to "the farm", a haven free of zombies.

They find the "Safe Haven" farm, owned by the elderly Reganites, whom the group thinks is hiding their daughter Isaac because she's a zombie. They later meet Isaac, finding her uninfected; because her parents don't have any way to keep track of the outside world, they don't know about the infection. She keeps it secret, thinking her partially-senile parents would have heartattacks.

Isaac, Green Bay, Brooklyn, Chicago and Romeo get high on weed the next day, setting off fireworks that attract zombies. After Chris kills a zombie, Lincoln explains to the couple about the outbreak; however, this goes over their heads as they pay more attention to the drug use than the zombies, who they think are stoners. Harlem snaps at Darnell and Green Bay, revealing she is deaf and can read lips. Green Bay and Isaac take out zombies that make it to the house, using weapons and "mind-blowing" facts. Out in the field, Darnell accidentally kills the Super Survivor, who followed the fireworks, with a gun. Anguished, Darnell ends up pinned by a zombie; Harlem shoots him in the head, sick of his idiocy.

Brooklyn has Romeo bite her so they can be together, only to learn minutes later that a cure has been put in the water supply; she and Romeo spray water into their bite marks, curing them. Romeo admits that he finds Brooklyn attractive but bitchy. Using super soakers and the garden hose, the group spray the zombies with the cure; however, Lincoln still shoots live rounds at them until Chicago stops him.

Later, the survivors and the cured have a party, where Chris finally kisses a happy Harlem; Chris also reverts to being kind. Romeo and Brooklyn make out, while Chicago has sex with a cured woman. Green Bay and Isaac head to her room for sex, only to hear the radio announce a meteor the size of Texas is heading to Earth.

== Cast ==
- Tim Ogletree as Green Bay, a parody of Columbus from Zombieland.
- Joey Oglesby as Chicago, a parody of Tallahassee from Zombieland.
- Troy Ogletree as Romeo, a parody of R from Warm Bodies.
- Dave Sheridan as Sheriff Lincoln, a parody of Rick Grimes from The Walking Dead.
- Sophia Taylor Ali as Brooklyn, a parody of Wichita from Zombieland.
- Danielle Garcia as Harlem, a parody of Little Rock from Zombieland.
- Mason Dakota Galyon as Chris Lincoln, a parody of Carl Grimes from The Walking Dead.
- Andrew Pozza as Darnell, a parody of Daryl Dixon from The Walking Dead.
- Jacqui Holland as Isaac.
- Trendton Rostedt as Super Survivor. His clothes and weapon of choice (machete) indicates that he is a parody of Jesus from The Walking Dead.

== Production ==
Tim Ogletree joined the project when producer Derek Lee Nixon approached him with the idea of a zombie film spoof. Although reluctant to do another spoof film directly after Supernatural Activity, Nixon was able to convince him that they could turn around the spoof genre to make it more clever and be the first to lampoon The Walking Dead. The cast consists of Ogletree's brother and friends, an atmosphere he credited for making the shoot more enjoyable. Ogletree brought in director Scott Dow. Although they had collaborated on "business stuff", this was the first time they worked together on a film. Dow was fond of two scenes in particular when he read the script: an early scene in which a woman is killed, and a later scene with zombie strippers. Dow said that these scenes were very dark, but the absurd humor helped to mitigate it. He pushed for the film to be as dark as possible, as he wanted to appeal to fans of zombie films, which he knew he could not do without an MPAA "R" rating.

Dave Sheridan was cast three days before production began. Making sure that there was a camaraderie on the set was important to him, as he believes that it translates in better chemistry in the film. Due to his age and experience, Sheridan had a mentor-like role on the set. Sheridan was already a fan of The Walking Dead before joining the project. One of Sheridan's friends, a collector, bought one of the hats worn by Andrew Lincoln's character Rick Grimes on the TV series. Sheridan borrowed the hat to use it on the set of The Walking Deceased. Sheridan said the film was always meant to be more of a parody than a spoof and cited iZombie as proof that zombies in popular culture had "jumped the shark". Responding to criticism of horror spoofs, Sheridan said that the film focuses primarily on character development instead of throwaway pop culture references. Sheridan also cited the cast's propensity to improvise as another way that the film was different than traditional spoofs. Filming took place in San Antonio, Texas.

== Release ==
The Walking Deceased premiered at WalkerStalkerCon on March 15, 2015. ARC Entertainment released it theatrically on March 20, 2015.

== Reception ==
Rotten Tomatoes, a review aggregator, reports that 0% of 11 surveyed critics gave the film a positive review; the average rating is 2.55/10. Metacritic rated it 9/100 based on four reviews. Frank Scheck of The Hollywood Reporter called it a "lame satire of zombie movies, whose shelf life expired even before it was made". Ethan Alter of Film Journal International wrote, "Believe it or not, this witless spoof has even less brainpower than the gray-matter-starved creatures it's ridiculing." Martin Tsai of the Los Angeles Times described it as "a good-natured spoof" that parodies films too obscure for people who are not hardcore fans of the genre. Ken W. Hanley of Fangoria rated it 2.5/4 stars and wrote that although the film has many gags that fail, it is still better than studio-funded spoofs. Jim Kiest of the San Antonio Express-News wrote, "[S]ince the filmmakers didn’t figure out how to make separating zombies from their brains funny, but did get the blood-spurting special effects right, there are stretches when this is just another low-budget horror movie."

Nick Schager of The Village Voice wrote, "There's no more disposable type of comedy than the genre spoof, and no greater example of its general creative worthlessness than The Walking Deceased". Cary Darling of the Fort Worth Star-Telegram wrote, "Less a send-up of The Walking Dead than a misfired potshot at various zombie productions from Dawn of the Dead to Warm Bodies, it's a slop bucket of lazy writing and uninspired jokes." Kiko Martínez of the San Antonio Current called it "a flick with zero laughs and no creative drive whatsoever". Drew Tinnin of Dread Central rated it 2.5/5 stars and called it "pretty forgettable" but charming. Ed Gonzalez of Slant Magazine rated it 0.5/5 stars and called it a misogynistic and homophobic film that appeals to "bro" subculture. Matt Fowler of IGN rated it 4/10 and said that spoofs do not have a place in modern society due to the proliferation of online humor and memes.
