= When in Rome (2002 film) =

- DVD cover
- Directed by: Steve Purcell
- Written by: Michael Swerdlick
- Produced by: Neil Steinberg; Natan Zahavi
- Starring: Mary-Kate and Ashley Olsen
- Cinematography: Marcello Montarsi
- Edited by: Sherwood Jones
- Music by: Brahm Wenger
- Production companies: Dualstar Entertainment Group; Tapestry Films
- Distributed by: Warner Home Video
- Release date: November 26, 2002
- Running time: 85 minutes
- Country: United States
- Language: English

When in Rome is a 2002 American adventure comedy film directed by Steve Purcell and starring Mary-Kate and Ashley Olsen. The film was produced by Dualstar Entertainment Group and Tapestry Films and released by Warner Home Video on November 26, 2002.

== Plot ==
Twins Leila and Charli Hunter go to Rome to participate in a Summer Intern Program along with four others: Paolo, Nobu, Dari, and Heidi. After beginning the intern program, the sisters are soon fired due to careless mishaps. They soon meet Derek Hammond, who re-hires them. They spend the day at Hammond’s house, where Leila meets bad boy Ryan, who happens to be Derek’s nephew. Leila and Ryan develop a liking for each other. Back at work, the girls are grasping more the concept of being responsible. They become great friends with the other interns. Charli and Paolo develop feelings for each other.

When attempting to deliver some designs for a shoot, Mr. Tortoni sabotages them by stealing the dresses. Leila, with Ryan’s help, captures pictures of the incident and delivers the pictures to Derek. Everyone helps to make new dresses, using Charlie’s designs, before the big day. In the end, the photoshoot goes well and Tortoni re-hires the interns. Derek arrives and it is discovered that Tortoni was always jealous for having everything, the money, and the girl (Jamie).

The movie closes with Jamie and Derek and Charli and Paolo kissing. Ryan tries to kiss Leila, but she tells him she’s good with just a hug. Derek decides to take all the interns to New York with him.

== Cast ==
- Ashley Olsen - Leila Hunter
- Mary-Kate Olsen - Charli Hunter
- Michelangelo Tommaso - Paolo
- Derek Lee Nixon - Ryan
- Leslie Danon - Jamie
- Julian Stone - Derek Hammond
- Archie Kao - Nobu
- Ilenia Lazzarin - Dari
- Valentina Mattolini - Heidi
- Matt Patresi - Mr. Enrico Tortoni
