= Naked (2017 film) =

2017 American comedy film

- Theatrical release poster
- Directed by: Michael Tiddes
- Screenplay by: Cory Koller; Marlon Wayans; Rick Alvarez
- Based on: Naken; 2000 Swedish film by Torkel Knutsson; Mårten Knutsson
- Produced by: Ted Sarandos; Marlon Wayans; Rick Alvarez; Todd Garner; Ryan Lewis
- Starring: Marlon Wayans; Regina Hall; Loretta Devine; J.T. Jackson; Eliza Coupe; Scott Foley; David Sheridan; Neil Brown Jr. Brian McKnight; Dennis Haysbert
- Cinematography: David Ortkiese
- Edited by: Lawrence Jordan
- Music by: David Newman
- Production companies: Broken Road Productions; Baby Way Productions
- Distributed by: Netflix
- Release date: August 11, 2017
- Running time: 96 minutes
- Country: United States
- Language: English

Naked is a 2017 American comedy film directed by Michael Tiddes and written by Rick Alvarez, Cory Koller and Marlon Wayans. It is a remake of the 2000 Swedish film Naken. The film stars Marlon Wayans, Regina Hall, Jonathan Todd Jackson, Scott Foley, Loretta Devine, Brian McKnight and Dennis Haysbert. The film was released on Netflix on August 11, 2017.

== Plot ==
Substitute teacher Rob Anderson is offered a full-time teaching job, but is reluctant to commit. He and fiancée, physician Megan Swope, fly to Charleston, South Carolina for their wedding the next day. Megan's disapproving father, businessman Reginald, has invited Megan's successful ex-boyfriend Cody. Rob goes out with his best man, Benny, only to wake up on his wedding day, naked in an elevator in a hotel far from the church. He is arrested for streaking, but when the church bells ring, he is pulled back in time to the elevator an hour earlier; Rob realizes he is stuck in a time loop, reliving this hour.

Desperate, Rob gradually adapts to his situation. When he learns that no wedding at that church has ever been canceled, he concludes that God has intervened. Rob develops multiple ways to obtain clothing and travel to the church; gains the trust of a police duo, a biker gang, and singer Brian McKnight; learns that Cody is planning a hostile takeover of Reginald's company; and has meaningful conversations with his mother, Megan, and Reginald. He eventually discovers that Megan's jealous maid of honor Vicky abducted him and put him in the elevator after hiring a prostitute, Callie, to seduce him (which backfired—Callie actually helped Rob with his vows).

In the final iteration of the loop, Rob enlists the cops to race across town, invites Callie to the wedding, and gets his suit to the church. He exposes Cody and Vicky, earns Reginald's approval, and marries Megan. He has accepted the teaching job and wants to have a stable, grounded life with her.

== Cast ==
- Marlon Wayans as Rob Anderson
- Regina Hall as Megan Anderson (née Swope)
- Loretta Devine as Carol
- Eliza Coupe as Vicky
- Scott Foley as Cody Favors
- Dave Sheridan as Officer Mike Bentley
- Neil Brown Jr. as Officer Rick McBride
- Brian McKnight as himself
- Dennis Haysbert as Reginald Swope
- J.T. Jackson as Benny
- Cory Hardrict as Drill
- Rick Fitts as Father Butterfield
- Jwaundace Candece as Shaundra
- Jason Davis as Principal Melon
- Minka Kelly as Callie, the hooker

== Production ==
On September 21, 2016, it was announced Marlon Wayans and Regina Hall would star in the film. On October 20, 2016, Cory Hardrict joined the cast of the film. Principal photography began three days earlier on October 17, 2016.

== Release ==
The film was released on Netflix on August 11, 2017.

== Reception ==
Naked received generally negative reviews from critics upon release, criticizing the concept and humor. In his review of the film, Mike D'Angelo of The A.V. Club said, "For many, Groundhog Day qualifies as a near-perfect comedy. Apparently, though, there are some highly motivated people out there who think it’d be a whole lot funnier if the guy stuck in the endless time loop were constantly running around with his bare ass exposed and his hands covering his junk." He later added, "Let’s place the blame where it squarely belongs: on the moronic premise. Groundhog Day but he's naked? Why?"

"The film clearly does not care about establishing a realistic world," Cody Schmitz of Decider said about the film, "It just wants to get Wayans in that magic elevator and in the nude." Renee Schonfeld of Common Sense Media called it a "lowbrow farce with action, swearing and partial nudity." The film holds 0% on the review aggregator website Rotten Tomatoes based on 8 reviews.

== See also ==
- List of films featuring time loops
