= Peter Woodward =

British actor and writer (born 1956)

- Born: 24 January 1956 (age 70); London, England
- Education: Royal Academy of Dramatic Art
- Occupations: Actor; screenwriter; stuntman
- Years active: 1978–present
- Father: Edward Woodward
- Relatives: Tim Woodward (brother); Sarah Woodward (sister); Michele Dotrice (stepmother)

Peter Woodward (born 24 January 1956) is a British actor, screenwriter and stuntman. He is best known for his role as Galen in the Babylon 5 spin-offs Babylon 5: A Call to Arms, Crusade and Babylon 5: The Lost Tales. He is also known for his role as British Army Brigadier General Charles O'Hara in The Patriot.

== Early life and education ==
Woodward was born on 24 January 1956 in London, the second son of actors Venetia Mary Collett (also known as Venetia Barrett) and Edward Woodward. His siblings Tim and Sarah are also actors. He was educated at Haileybury and Imperial Service College, before studying acting at the Royal Academy of Dramatic Art (RADA), graduating in 1975 with an Acting (RADA Diploma).

== Career ==
=== Actor ===
After graduation, he joined the Royal Shakespeare Company, starring in many of their productions including The Winter's Tale, The Comedy of Errors and A Midsummer Night's Dream. Woodward has also played a wide range of major character roles in films and television including the role of the German Captain Stossel in the feature film The Brylcreem Boys. Woodward voiced the role of Edwin Carbunkle the main villain in the 3D Computer animation children's comedy film Postman Pat: The Movie.

==== Crusade ====
As the Techno Mage Galen in the Babylon 5 spin-off Crusade, Woodward played opposite his father in the episode "The Long Road." In the episode, the Excalibur visits a planet that may contain a potent anti-viral agent in its minerals. Earth agencies are strip-mining the planet. Edward Woodward played Alwyn, a rogue Techno Mage living on the planet with its inhabitants who was a friend of Galen's former teacher.

=== Fight arranger and Conquest ===
As a former member of the British Academy of Dramatic Combat, Woodward is known in the film industry for his work as a fight arranger. Woodward's dramatic combat training inspired him to study historical weaponry and combat techniques. This interest ultimately led him to create, co-write, and host The History Channel's documentary series Conquest (2002-2003), a hands-on showcase of weapons, training and combat techniques throughout history.

=== Writer ===
Branching out in the late 1990s, Woodward and his father formed Tripal Productions, for which he wrote and produced his first feature film The House of Angelo, directed by Jim Goddard in 1997 with his father starring as Angelo. Woodward also wrote the feature film Closing the Ring, which was directed by Richard Attenborough.

== Filmography ==
=== Film ===
Year	Title	Role	Notes
1987	Metal Skin Panic MADOX-01	Lieutenant Kilgore	Voice, English dub
2000	The Patriot	Brigadier General Charles O'Hara	
2006	We Fight to Be Free	Edward Braddock	
2007	Babylon 5: The Lost Tales	Galen	Direct-to-video
2007	Closing the Ring	N/A	Writer and producer
2008	National Treasure: Book of Secrets	Palace Security Guard	
2010	Unthinkable	N/A	Writer
2011	Dead Space: Aftermath	Lead Interrogator	Voice
2014	Postman Pat: The Movie	Edwin Carbunkle	Voice
2014	The Crypt	Father Antonio	
2015	Awaiting	Jerry	
2016	The Comedian's Guide to Survival	Morris	
2016	Space Dogs	Dr. Cat	Voice
2017	The Last Scout	Edward	
2018	Dystopia	Philip Edier	
2020	Stealing Chaplin	Hynkel	
2021	Dolphin Island	Jonah Coleridge	
2022	Moonshot	Gary	Voice
2024	Sex-Positive	Hank	
2026	Doctor Plague	Professor Altman	
2026	Harbinger	Henry Decker	

=== Television ===
Year	Title	Role	Notes
1989	Megazone 23 III	Edval	Voice
1999	Crusade (TV series)	Galen	13 episodes
2001	Walker, Texas Ranger	Victor Drake	1 episode: "Blood Diamonds"
2002	Masada	Host	Television film; documentary
2002	Egypt Land of the Gods	Host	Television film; documentary
2002–2003	Conquest	Self	28 episodes; also writer and producer
2002–2005	Charmed	Aku, The Source	4 episodes
2005	The True Story of Alexander the Great	Host	Television film; documentary
2005	Stargate Atlantis	Otto	Episode: "The Tower"
2009–2010	Fringe	August	2 episodes
2009–2011	Batman: The Brave and the Bold	Ra's al Ghul, Great Caesar	Voice, 3 episodes
2010	NCIS	David Devoisier	Episode: "Jack-Knife"
2011	Eagleheart	Doolan	Episode: "The Human Bat"
2015	The Good Wife	Charles Ephraham	Episode: "Driven"
2017–2019	Wacky Races	Dick Dastardly, additional voices	Voice, 21 episodes
