= Sextuplets (film) =

- Theatrical release poster
- Directed by: Michael Tiddes
- Screenplay by: Mike Glock; Rick Alvarez; Marlon Wayans
- Story by: Mike Glock
- Produced by: Marlon Wayans; Rick Alvarez; Nathan Reimann
- Starring: Marlon Wayans; Bresha Webb; Michael Ian Black; Molly Shannon; Glynn Turman
- Cinematography: Don Burgess
- Edited by: Lawrence Jordan
- Music by: John Debney
- Production companies: Ugly Baby Productions; Wayans Alvarez Productions
- Distributed by: Netflix
- Release date: August 16, 2019
- Running time: 99 minutes
- Country: United States
- Language: English

Sextuplets is a 2019 American comedy film directed by Michael Tiddes from a screenplay by Mike Glock, Rick Alvarez and Marlon Wayans, who also produced the film and starred in the lead role. It co-stars Bresha Webb, Michael Ian Black, Molly Shannon and Glynn Turman. It follows a man who sets out to find his long-lost siblings after discovering he is one of sextuplets his mother had.

The film was digitally released on Netflix on August 16, 2019. It received negative reviews from critics, who called it "lazy, messy, and deeply unfunny".

== Plot ==
Expectant father Alan Daniel's nesting instincts kick in. He becomes less focused at work, which frustrates his boss Linda as she'd hoped he'd soon become a partner. She is very displeased when he brings up paternity leave.

At his wife Marie's sonogram, the obstetrician asks for Alan's family medical history but he cannot provide it as he was given up at birth. He decides to seek his birth mother, so enlists his disapproving judge father-in-law's help in accessing the sealed adoption records.

Now, with his birth mother's name and address, Alan seeks her out. Russell answers the door, who turns out to share his birthday and is unaware of his twin brother. Alan comes across a surprising newspaper article hidden down a vent that they were sextuplets.

Russell decides to accompany Alan on a road trip to find the others before Alan's baby is born. On the way they discover they have things in common, like favorite sitcoms and food tastes. After hours driving, Alan pulls off the road to rest, as Russell doesn't drive.

Waking up in a field, they have to hurry from a bull that Russell inadvertently angers. Alan's new vehicle gets damaged in the process. Dawn is an exotic dancer serving time in an Alabama women's prison for an aggravated assault from a lap dance, and asks Alan to pay her bail of 10,000.

Ethan, upon getting details from Alan as he's a hustler, tries to steal his identity. He goes to his office, taking what he can, and manages to fool both a coworker and boss he's Alan. This, although he dresses and talks like a '70s pimp. He enters Linda's office demanding an advance. Although initially angered, Linda is finally turned on by his aggression.

On the road to visit Baby Pete in Mississippi, Alan, Russell and Dawn stop at a roadside convenience store. Two rednecks she was heavily flirting with come at them after clumsy Russell accidentally breaks off their truck's side mirror. It's Alan's nose that they break.

Sneaking into Alan's house, Ethan tries to pass for Alan. Marie is suspicious and then sure he's not Alan when he's pervy in the breastfeeding class. Getting outside, Marie demands he come clean. He admits he's Ethan, and he is trying to get a loan with Alan's clean credit.

While at the hospital visiting Baby Pete, Alan gets his nose looked at. Pete is extremely stunted and has had health problems his whole life. He has an enlarged heart, very little intestine left, bad knees, an arm they're threatening to amputate and he's in the ICU for kidney failure. A doctor enters, thanking Alan for donating Pete his kidney.

Neither of his other siblings are viable donors, but Alan insists he can't donate for his baby's sake. However, Pete switches the nose surgery authorisation for the kidney transplant one. After he's prepped for surgery, Alan discovers they're taking his kidney as well as fixing his nose. He wakes to one less kidney, a fixed nose and with a determination to kill his newly found siblings.

As Alan and Russell argue in front of the hospital, they are abducted. Taken to Lynette's, Jaspar unhoods them and demands to know why they've been seeking him. Just like most of the siblings, he grew up in a state facility, which has negatively affected him. Jaspar is marked for his red hair and lighter complexion. The brothers bond over love of a 70s series.

Lynette arrives early from her cruise and demands answers. Alan and Jaspar introduce themselves and Marie calls Alan to say she's in labor. Jaspar loans his sports car to his brothers and they race to the hospital. Russell tells him to tuck and roll so he doesn't have to stop and can evade the police. Arriving to the room, Alan is just in time for the birth and meets Ethan. Truly looking alike, Ethan offers to sacrifice himself to the police so Alan doesn't miss his daughter's first few months.

Three months later both Alan and Marie's families are having a barbeque in celebration of the baby.

== Cast ==
- Marlon Wayans as Alan Spellman Daniels / Russell Spellman / Dawn Spellman / Jasper Spellman / Ethan Spellman / Baby Pete Spellman / Lynette Spellman
  - Spiral Jackson as Russell (body double)
- Bresha Webb as Marie Daniels
- Molly Shannon as Linda
- Glynn Turman as Leland
- Michael Ian Black as Doug
- Debbi Morgan as Janet
- Grace Junot as Dr. Greenberg
- Robert Pralgo as Dr. Theodore Williams
- Jason Graham as Dr. Ellis
- Jwaundace Candece as Female Guard #2

== Production ==
In August 2018, it was announced that Marlon Wayans would star in Sextuplets. In October 2018, Molly Shannon, Glynn Turman, Michael Ian Black, and Debbi Morgan joined the cast.

== Reception ==
On review aggregator website Rotten Tomatoes, the film holds an approval rating of 20% based on 15 reviews, and an average rating of 2.8/10. The website's critical consensus reads, "Lazy, messy, and deeply unfunny, Sextuplets is the latest misfire from the collaborative duo of Marlon Wayans and Michael Tiddes." On Metacritic, it has a weighted average score of 21 out of 100, based on 5 critics, indicating "generally unfavorable reviews".
