= Nick Cannon Presents: Short Circuitz =

- Title card
- Created by: Nick Cannon
- Directed by: Nick Cannon
- Starring: Nick Cannon
- Country of origin: United States
- No. of seasons: 2
- No. of episodes: 8

Production
- Executive producer: Nick Cannon
- Running time: 22 minutes

Original release
- Network: MTV
- Release: April 5 – July 5, 2007

Nick Cannon Presents: Short Circuitz is a sketch comedy show starring Nick Cannon on MTV that debuted April 5, 2007. The show was cancelled and pulled from MTV on April 30, 2007, due to low ratings. A month after the show's cancellation, the series returned on June 7, 2007 as part of the Nick Cannon Power Hour, but was soon cancelled again.

== Cast ==
The show's cast is made up of mostly players from Cannon's other series Wild 'n Out

- Nick Cannon
- Affion Crockett
- Eliza Coupe
- Leonard Robinson
- Mikey Day
- Taran Killam
- Katt Williams
- Sean Lavallies
- Eric Murphy

== Episode list ==
=== Season 1 ===
==== Episode 1 ====
Air Date: 4/5/07

Starring: Taran Killam, Affion Crockett, Eliza Coupe, Mikey Day, Leonard Robinson, Nick Cannon, Sean Lavallies, Eric Murphy

Featuring: Katt Williams

Guest Starring : Sway

Sketches:

- Rappers Against Child Support
- Judge Mo Dollars (extended Wild n' Out skit)
- Career Boosters
- The Claymate Show
- Ludacris Freestyle (Affion Crockett)

==== Episode 2 ====
Air Date: 4/12/07

Starring: Mikey Day, Nick Cannon, Affion Crockett, Leonard Robinson

Featuring: Spliff Star, James Adomian as George W. Bush

Guest Starring: Ice-T and CoCo

Sketches:

- Old People'ing (drive-by parody)
- Ice T-vo
- Greatest Ass Whuppins (Lionel Vs Brenda)
- Spontaneous Hypeman Syndrome
- Working With White People
- Next: School Teacher Edition
- Suge Knight Light
- Hell Nah Kanye (Kanye diss by George Bush)

==== Episode 3 ====
Air Date: 4/19/07

Starring: Taran Killam, Affion Crockett, Eliza Coupe, Mikey Day, Leonard Robinson, Nick Cannon

Featuring: Katt Williams

Guest Starring: Snoop Dogg and Ant

Sketches:

- Lessons In The Workplace #204: First Day On The Job
- Judge Mo Dollars (extended Wild 'n Out skit)
- Coming Out Insurance
- Yo Momma - Afghanistan
- Davonte Blaine - Street Magic
- Yak'n Off FM
- Jay's Anatomy (Eric Murphy)

=== Season 2 ===
==== Episode 4 * ====
Air Date: 6/7/07

Starring: Taran Killam, Affion Crockett, Eliza Coupe, Mikey Day, Leonard Robinson, Nick Cannon

Sketches:

- BBS
- Junk in the Trunk^{1}
- Cribs: Sean Lavallies and Jessica Alba
- Back That S*** Up
- MTV Scarred Spoof (parody of fellow MTV show Scarred by LurkSquad)^{1}
- Simmons & Simmons pt.1
- Camel Toe
- Simmons & Simmons pt.2
- Aching for Aiken (The Claymate Show)
- Skanks on a Plane (parody of Snakes on a Plane)^{1}
- Sean John Silver's (Leonard Robinson)

==== Episode 5 * ====
Air Date: 6/14/07

Starring: Taran Killam, Affion Crockett, Eliza Coupe, Mikey Day, Leonard Robinson, Nick Cannon

Featuring: Katt Williams and Kevin Hart

Guest Starring: Lil Jon

Sketches:

- Thanks White People
- Judge Mo Dollars (extended Wild 'n Out skit)
- Geico Ad^{1}
- Greatest Ass Whuppins (Björk)
- Bootleg Movie Awards pt. 1
- Erase Racism^{1}
- Bootleg Movie Awards pt. 2
- Calf-a-Sizer 3000
- No More Drama (Nyima Funk)

==== Episode 6 * ====
Air Date: 6/21/07

Starring: Taran Killam, Affion Crockett, Eliza Coupe, Mikey Day, Leonard Robinson, Nick Cannon

Guest Starring: Lil Jon

Sketches:

- Davonte Blaine: Street Magic
- Rap Producer: Jesus
- Beverly Hills ATM
- Vagina 101^{1}
- Action 6 News at 6^{1}
- The Claymate Show
- Dane Cooks
- Club Clinic
- Scarred by Scarred^{1}
- Yak'n Off
- Facebook Livin^{1}
- Yo Mamma- Harlem, NY (Sean Lavallies and Eric Murphy)

==== Episode 7 ** ====
Air Date: 6/28/07

Starring: Taran Killam, Affion Crockett, Eliza Coupe, Mikey Day, Leonard Robinson, Nick Cannon

Featuring: Katt Williams

Guest Starring : Sway Calloway

Sketches:

- Rappers Against Child Support
- Judge Mo Dollars (extended Wild 'n Out skit)
- Career Boosters
- Bi-Curious by Greg Scarnici ^{1}
- The Negrotiator
- The Profane Gourmet^{1}
- Day Spa^{1}
- Sports Daily With Mary Banks
- Ludacris' Freestyle Video (Affion Crockett)

==== Episode 8 ** ====
Air Date: 7/5/07

Starring: Mikey Day, Nick Cannon, Affion Crockett, Leonard Robinson

Featuring: James Adomian as George W. Bush

Guest Starring: Ice T and CoCo

Sketches:

- Old People'ing (drive-by parody)
- Ice T-vo
- Working With White People
- Jewdacris^{1}
- Next: School Teacher Edition pt. 1
- Suge Knight Light
- Next: School Teacher Edition pt. 2
- Get Topless^{1}
- Horny Doctors^{1}
- Hell Nah Kanye (Kanye diss by George W. Bush)

^{1} These skits are the winning videos from the Short Circuitz web site promo, where viewers can send in a taped parody of a show, commercial, music video, etc. and win $1,000 in the process

*These episodes featured a video-like set up with a playlist on the left side of the screen.

**These episodes featured the same (with the exception of one or two) sketches as previous episodes with the addition of the three viewer submitted sketches.

== Website ==
Short Circuitz featured a Web 2.0 community at ShortCircuitz.mtv.com, where viewers were encouraged to upload their own homemade parody videos of various media phenomena, including music videos, commercials and television programs. Users on the site rated and commented on each other's videos.
