= A Haunted House =

2013 film directed by Michael Tiddes

- Theatrical release poster
- Directed by: Michael Tiddes
- Screenplay by: Marlon Wayans; Rick Alvarez
- Story by: Marlon Wayans
- Produced by: Marlon Wayans; Rick Alvarez
- Starring: Marlon Wayans; Essence Atkins; Cedric the Entertainer; Nick Swardson; David Koechner; Dave Sheridan
- Cinematography: Steve Gainer
- Edited by: Suzanne Hines
- Production companies: IM Global; Baby Way Productions
- Distributed by: Open Road Films
- Release date: January 11, 2013
- Running time: 86 minutes
- Country: United States
- Language: English
- Budget: $2.5 million
- Box office: $60.1 million

A Haunted House is a 2013 American horror comedy film directed by Michael Tiddes and written and produced by Marlon Wayans and Rick Alvarez. The film stars Wayans alongside Essence Atkins, Cedric the Entertainer, Nick Swardson, David Koechner and Dave Sheridan.

Although Wayans said the film was "not exactly a parody but rather a movie with funny characters doing the opposite of what typical people do in similar horror films," the film parodies the "found footage" horror genre, such as Paranormal Activity and The Devil Inside.

A Haunted House was released on January 11, 2013, and received negative reviews from critics, but grossed $60 million against a budget of $2.5 million. A sequel, A Haunted House 2, was released on April 18, 2014.

== Plot ==
In August 2012, a young couple, Malcolm and Kisha, move in together. As Kisha arrives, she accidentally kills Malcolm's dog named Shiloh by running him over with her car. On the first night, Malcolm is constantly awoken with Kisha farting loudly that eventually drives him out of the room. The next morning, when Kisha notices her keys on the floor, she tells Malcolm they might have a ghost. To prove to her wrong, Malcolm has security cameras installed by Dan the Security Man and his brother Bobby. Malcolm tries to have sex with the camera on, but Kisha tells him to turn it off. Before they really start, Malcolm turns the camera back on and records everything. In the morning, Malcolm and Kisha watch the video and notice the door moved. Malcolm suggests it was caused by his lovemaking.

The next night, Malcolm notices the paranormal activity and tries to move out of the house and leave Kisha. Since he can't sell his house in the current market, they hire Chip, a psychic, to investigate; Chip immediately falls in love with Malcolm. Before Chip can leave, after finding nothing wrong, Kisha confesses to making a deal with the devil for a pair of shoes. Chip tells Kisha she is screwed and invites Malcolm to join his wrestling group. After Chip leaves, Kisha shows Malcolm a video of her eighth birthday, in which she began to experience paranormal activity by her imaginary friend, Tony. The next night, Kisha gets out of bed in the middle of the night, stands by the bed for several hours, and begins to dance. Malcolm wakes up and follows Kisha to the kitchen, where he catches her eating uncooked food and drinking old milk. She screams crazily when Malcolm restrains her. In the morning, Kisha remembers nothing.

On another night, Kisha urges Malcolm to investigate a noise, but it turns out to be Rosa, his Hispanic housekeeper. Rosa quits, and Malcolm and Kisha smoke marijuana with the ghost to relieve their pain. The next day, Malcolm's friend Steve and his girlfriend Jenny bring over a ouija board to communicate with the ghost. When it misspells ghost as "gost", they all laugh at it, and it angrily throws the ouija board across the room, scaring Jenny and Steve out of the house. That night, the ghost drags Malcolm out of the room and has sex with Kisha. When Malcolm finds out, he calls his cousin Ray Ray, who immediately flees when he sees the ghost's powers. That same night, Kisha waits for the ghost until it gets late and leaves. After Kisha leaves, the ghost rapes Malcolm.

Malcolm and Kisha anger the ghost by ignoring it, so it attacks Kisha in the night while Malcolm listens to music, through headphones, on his computer. In the morning, Malcolm notices something is wrong with Kisha and calls Father Doug to do an exorcism. When it does not work, Malcolm calls Dan and Bobby to help. Chip also rushes into the house to help. During the exorcism, Kisha escapes into the living room. Before Malcolm and Doug find her, Doug accidentally shoots and kills Rosa, who had come to pick up her last check. When they all meet in the living room, Kisha behaves very strangely and flees to the basement. The group follows and finds her crying in a corner. When Malcolm reaches for her, she attacks him, and the whole group beats her up, apparently forcing the ghost out of her body.

The next night, Malcolm and Kisha have sex with the camera on for about three hours. In the middle of the night, Kisha wakes up and stands next to the bed for a few hours before walking out of the room and making a big crash and screaming Malcolm's name. When Malcolm comes out of his room, Kisha throws him back, and he hits the camera, knocking him out. When Kisha enters the room her shirt is bloody. She crawls to Malcolm and sniffs his body until he farts in her face. As Kisha lunges at the camera, her face takes on a demonic appearance. A minute later, Malcolm wakes up telling everyone he survived and Kisha is behind him making him scream.

== Cast ==
- Marlon Wayans as Malcolm Johnson
- Essence Atkins as Kisha Davis
- Cedric the Entertainer as Father Doug Williams
- Nick Swardson as Chip the Psychic, a psychic who lusts after Malcolm
- David Koechner as Dan "the Man" Kearney
- Dave Sheridan as Bob "Bobby" Kearney, Dan's illiterate brother/associate
- Marlene Forte as Rosa, Malcolm's Hispanic housekeeper
- Andrew Daly as Steve, Malcolm's exchanger friend
- Alanna Ubach as Jenny, Steve's wife
- Affion Crockett as Ray-Ray, Malcolm's gangster cousin
- Robin Thede and J. B. Smoove as Kisha's mother and stepfather

== Reception ==
=== Box office ===
A Haunted House grossed $40.4 million in North America and $20.1 million in other territories for a worldwide total of $60.5 million, against a budget of $2.5 million.

The film grossed $18.1 million in its opening weekend, finishing second at the box office behind Zero Dark Thirty ($24.4 million).

=== Critical response ===
On the review aggregator website Rotten Tomatoes, 10% of 50 critics' reviews are positive, with an average rating of 2.9/10. The website's consensus reads: "A Haunted House seeks to offend every sensibility, but it's [sic] greatest sin: not being funny!" Metacritic, which uses a weighted average, assigned the film a score of 20 out of 100, based on 16 critics, indicating "generally unfavorable" reviews. Audiences polled by CinemaScore gave the film an average grade of "B−" on an A+ to F scale.

Joe Leydon of Variety wrote: "The hit-to-miss ratio is less than impressive throughout A Haunted House, a frenetic and freewheeling satirical comedy that only sporadically scores a bull's-eye while aiming at easy targets." Frank Scheck of The Hollywood Reporter said the film "Too often settles for raunchiness instead of wit." Scheck praises Wayans and Atkins for their performances, but concludes that "the parody genre is as played out as the film styles being sent up."

Nick Swardson was nominated for a Golden Raspberry Award for Worst Supporting Actor for his performance in the film.

== Home media ==
A Haunted House was released on DVD, Blu-ray, Ultraviolet and digital copy on April 23, 2013.

== Sequel ==
On April 8, 2013, it was confirmed that Wayans, Open Road, and IM Global Octane would produce a sequel due to the financial success of the first film. The sequel had begun shooting in late August 2013. A Haunted House 2 was released on April 18, 2014.

== See also ==
- List of black films of the 2010s
