= Funniest Wins =

- Genre: Game show
- Presented by: Marlon Wayans
- Country of origin: United States
- Original language: English
- No. of seasons: 1
- No. of episodes: 8

Production
- Executive producers: Adam Kaloustian; Todd A. Nelson; J. D. Roth; Andy Scheer
- Producers: Erik Tily; Chris Thoman
- Cinematography: David Ortkiese
- Camera setup: Multi-camera
- Running time: 42 minutes
- Production company: Eyeworks USA

Original release
- Network: TBS
- Release: June 20 – August 15, 2014

Funniest Wins is an American reality television competition on TBS show hosted by Marlon Wayans, in which comedians compete to be judged the funniest. The series ran from June 20, 2014 to August 15, 2014. The series holds a TV-14 rating, though some episodes are rated TV-MA.

== Format ==
Ten comedians, ranging from traditional stand-up comedians to influencer comedians from Vine and YouTube, compete in a variety of comedy challenges, including sketch comedy, music video parodies, roasts, and more. Each episode, a contestant is sent home until one comedian is left, with the winner receiving a $100,000 cash prize and a chance to star in an online series for Marlon Wayans’ website WhatTheFunny.com.

== Production ==
In February 2014, it was announced that TBS had picked up eight one-hour episodes of a new competition series led by Marlon Wayans, with the then-working title Funniest Wins. To select the contestants, comedians sent in audition tapes, followed by a round of live auditions.

== Series overview ==
Episode Number	1	2	3	4	5	6	7	8
Challenge; Winner	Christina	Billy	Sydney	Christina	Jenny; Manon	Billy	Billy	N/A

=== Contestants and progress ===
Contestant	1	2	3	4	5	6	7	8
Sydney Castillo	LOW	WIN	WIN	SAFE	WIN	SAFE	BTM2	WINNER
Billy Sorrells	SAFE	WIN	BTM2	BTM2	BTM2	WIN	WIN	RUNNER UP
Jenny Zigrino	WIN	SAFE	WIN	SAFE	SAFE	BTM2	SAFE	RUNNER UP
Christina Pazsitzky	BTM2	BTM2	SAFE	SAFE	WIN	SAFE	ELIM	
Manon Mathews	SAFE	WIN	LOW	WIN	SAFE	ELIM		
Tiffany Haddish	LOW	SAFE	SAFE	LOW	ELIM			
Key Lewis	WIN	SAFE	LOW	ELIM				
Jason Nash	SAFE	LOW	ELIM					
Matt McManus	SAFE	ELIM						
Ryan "Rydoon" Muldoon	ELIM							

The contestant won the competition.
The contestant(s) was the runner-up.
The contestant won the Elimination Challenge and was safe.
The contestant received negative criticism in the Elimination Challenge, but was not in the bottom 2.
The contestant was in the bottom 2 and was the last to be announced safe.
The contestant was eliminated from the competition.

== Episodes ==
No.	Title	Original release date
1	"The Future of Comedy"	June 20, 2014
Marlon Wayans welcomes the 10 competitors and immediately tasks them with their first challenge, which is to perform comedy for tourists on a double-decker bus as it moves through the streets of Hollywood. Comedian Orlando Jones appears as a guest mentor.
2	"Billy Made It Weird"	June 27, 2014
Wayans and Internet superstar Brittany Furlan mentor the nine remaining competitors on the creation of funny Vine videos.
3	"Undercover Comic"	July 11, 2014
In this week's first challenge, the comedians must create hilarious characters for a round of speed-dating with actual daters as Wayans and guest mentor Iliza Shlesinger watch.
4	"Roasted"	July 18, 2014
Wayans reveals that this week's first guest mentor, DeRay Davis, is there to coach the comedians through their first challenge, which is the ultimate comedy snap rap battle in the gritty streets of Los Angeles. Andy Dick also helps prepare the comedians to roast singer Ray J.
5	"The Sound of Funny"	July 25, 2014
The remaining contestants must create a comedic music video.
6	"Tough Crowd"	August 1, 2014
With help from Wayans and guest mentor David Alan Grier, the comics do funny interviews with people on the street. Billy wins and Manon is eliminated.
7	"Get Animated"	August 8, 2014
The Final Four have one day to write and shoot a commercial parody to screen for Wayans, guest mentor Jamie Kennedy, and a live audience. In the end, Billy wins and Christina is eliminated. Note: This Episode Was Rated TV-MA-LS instead of TV-14-DL.
8	"Funniest Wins, Finally"	August 15, 2014
The Final Three perform stand-up, a live sketch, and present a digital short to a live audience, Wayans, and guest judge Damon Wayans Jr. In the end, Sydney wins the competition, earning $100,000. Billy and Jenny were the runner-ups.

== See also ==
- Last Comic Standing
