= Frank McKlusky, C.I. =

- Home video release poster
- Directed by: Arlene Sanford
- Screenplay by: Mark Perez
- Story by: Dave Sheridan; Mark Perez
- Produced by: Robert Simonds
- Starring: Dave Sheridan; Randy Quaid; Dolly Parton
- Cinematography: Tim Suhrstedt; Jeffrey Greeley
- Edited by: Alan Cody
- Music by: Randy Edelman
- Production companies: Touchstone Pictures; Robert Simonds Productions
- Distributed by: Buena Vista Pictures Distribution
- Release date: April 26, 2002
- Running time: 90 minutes
- Country: United States
- Language: English
- Budget: $18 million

Frank McKlusky, C.I. is a 2002 comedy film directed by Arlene Sanford and written by Mark Perez. Dave Sheridan plays McKlusky, a safety-conscious insurance claims investigator investigating the murder of his partner Jimmy, played by Kevin Farley. Randy Quaid and Dolly Parton play McKlusky's parents, “Madman” McKlusky, Frank's daredevil father, and Edith, Frank's over-protective mother.

Walt Disney Pictures developed Frank McKlusky Claims Investigator as a vehicle for Sheridan, out of enthusiasm for Sheridan's comedic talent, which they felt made him a potential movie star. However, the film was panned by critics, who criticized its humor, and Sheridan's performance, which was seen as being derivative of the comedy of Jim Carrey.

== Plot ==
Frank McKlusky was raised by his mother Edith, as a result of his daredevil father "Madman" McKlusky's tragic 1979 accident which left him in a coma, turned Edith into an over-protective mother and made Frank extremely safety conscious, as he constantly wears a helmet, kneepads and a pocket protector.

While working as a claims investigator for Conglomerate Insurance, Frank's partner Jimmy is murdered, forcing McKlusky to investigate his death while utilizing a series of disguises (including Mr. T in blackface) along with his new partner, Sharon, Frank uncovers gymnast steroid abuse and jockey murder, as well as learning that Jimmy was a homosexual.

== Cast ==
- Dave Sheridan as Frank McKlusky
- Cameron Richardson as Sharon Webber
- Randy Quaid as "Madman" McKlusky
- Enrico Colantoni as Scout Bayou
- Dolly Parton as Edith McKlusky
- Kevin Farley as Jimmy
- Orson Bean as Mr. Gafty
- Chyna as Freeda
- Kevin Pollak as Ronnie Rosengold
- Tracy Morgan as Reggie Rosengold
- Andy Richter as Herb
- Sawyer Sweeten as Young Frank McKlusky

In addition, the band Hanson, Scott Baio, Emmanuel Lewis, Gary Coleman, Willie Tyler & Lester, Lou Ferrigno and Gary Owens make cameo appearances as themselves.

== Development ==
Mark Perez wrote the screenplay for Walt Disney Pictures during his last week under a 1-year contract with the studio. Disney hired Perez to develop the screenplay Frank McKlusky Claims Investigator as a vehicle for actor Dave Sheridan; impressed by Sheridan's performance in the film Bubble Boy, Disney thought Sheridan would be "the next Jim Carrey". In 2001, Dolly Parton was cast as Edith McKlusky, Frank's over-protective mother. Parton's last film role was her cameo in The Beverly Hillbillies (1993).

== Release ==
Frank McKlusky C.I. received a limited theatrical release. Perez said "[Disney] only released it in 5 theaters in Florida". Perez recalls that, while attending a screening with his parents in Florida, "they thought I had bought out the whole theater but really just nobody showed up. It was just me and my family watching Frank McKlusky."

=== Critical reception ===
Leonard Maltin panned the film as a "bomb", calling it a "crude, clumsy comedy". The Oklahoman wrote, "What might make Frank McKlusky, C.I. worth renting is that it is so horribly bad. I laughed. I laughed quite a bit at jokes that have been done before in much better movies, starring much better casts." TV Guide gave the film 1 out of 4 stars, calling it a "cartoonish farce likely to disappoint even the staunchest fans of bird-brained comedy."

JoBlo.com gave the film 2 out of 10 stars, writing, "I was actually yawning as I tried to figure out how an entire production of people, most of whom had acted in successful films before, could take part in this movie, shoot these extremely lame over-the-top sequences, deliver these horrible lines and perpetuate every stupid, unfunny joke that you've seen rehashed over the past 10 years (fart, gay and handicap jokes abound), and not raise their hand and say, 'Uhhhhm, am I the only one who thinks that none of this is even one damn bit humorous??'" DVD Talk gave the film half a star, writing, "tries to be Jim Carrey and fails miserably - the lowlight being an instance where the character has to fake being a female gymnast and ends up doing a series of what appear to be dance routines. Quaid's character spends most of the film in a coma, so he doesn't have much to do, while Parton seems embarrassed [sic]. [...] Although I thought Sheridan was capable of something decent based upon his prior roles, McKlusky is the kind of film that ruins careers."

Nathan Rabin panned the film, writing, "Who is Dave Sheridan? Well, the quick, easy answer is that he is a poor man's Jim Carrey. Who is Frank McKlusky? Well, imagine, for a minute, that Ace Ventura was a generic nerd character and instead of being a pet detective be was essentially an insurance detective? If that sounds terrible, it's because it is. Theater owners, like audiences, were right to give this whole sorry production a hard pass."
