= Evan Jones (actor) =

American actor

- Born: April 1, 1976 (age 50); College Station, Texas, USA
- Occupation: Actor
- Years active: 1996-present

Evan Jones is an American actor who has been in films such as 8 Mile, Jarhead, and Gangster Squad.

The other supporting credits include roles in The Book of Eli, Glory Road and A Million Ways to Die in the West. Jones was a cast member of the television series October Road and has made guest appearances in series including Brothers & Sisters and Going to California.

== Life and career ==
Jones made his debut acting on the TV movie On the Line, which premiered in 1998. This was followed by minor roles in several TV series, such as those in Pacific Blue, Felicity, and Walker, Texas Ranger. He voiced several characters on the animated series Dragon Ball Z, before he landed guest spots on The District and ER. He later got a recurring role in Going to California, and soon appeared on the series The Guardian.

In 2002, he was cast in the horror film Wishcraft, which was followed by one of his major roles in the business. Jones got the part of Cheddar Bob in Eminem’s movie 8 Mile. Jones was later seen on an episode of Joan of Arcadia, as well as in the TV movie The Book of Ruth. In 2004, he worked on the films Mr. 3000 and The Last Shot.

In 2005, Jones became even more known for portraying Pfc. Dave Fowler in the movie Jarhead. His next project became taking on the role of basketball coach Moe Iba on the film Glory Road. From 2007 to 2008, Jones portrayed Ikey on the ABC drama series October Road.

Other films that the actor has appeared in include the war drama Rescue Dawn, as well as the romance film Lucky You. In 2007, Jones worked on the family film Gordon Glass, and was seen on the drama Touching Home the next year.

== Filmography ==
=== Film ===
Year	Title	Role	Notes
1996	The Trigger Effect	Movie Theater Audience Member	
1997	On the Line	District Attorney Lotchen	TV movie
1999	The Distraction	Paul	
2001	Going Greek	Stoner Roommate	
2002	Wishcraft	Eddie	
2002	8 Mile	Bob "Cheddar Bob"	
2003	Carnival Sun	Thug #1	Short
2004	The Book of Ruth	Ruby	TV movie
2004	Mr. 3000	Fryman	
2004	The Last Shot	Troy Haines	
2005	Jarhead	Private Dave Fowler	
2006	Glory Road	Moe Iba	
2006	Rescue Dawn	Pilot	
2007	Lucky You	Jason Keyes	
2007	Gordon Glass	Trot Mitchell	
2007	Black Woman's Guide to Finding a Good Man	White-Collar Friend	
2008	Touching Home	Timmy McClanahan	
2008	The Express: The Ernie Davis Story	Roger "Hound Dog" Davis	
2008	Pants on Fire	"Doc"	
2010	The Book of Eli	Martz	
2010	The Dry Land	Joe Davis	
2010	Healing Hands	Mike	TV movie
2010	Mirrors 2	Henry Schow	Video
2011	Answer This!	Izzy "Ice" Dasselway	
2011	This Never Happened	Patrick	Short
2012	Best Man Down	Winston	
2013	Gangster Squad	Neddy Herbert	
2014	A Million Ways to Die in the West	Lewis	
2014	The Homesman	Bob Giffen	
2015	Sun Choke	Attacker	
2017	Guardians of the Galaxy Vol. 2	Retch	
2017	Shot Caller	"Chopper"	
2018	Den of Thieves	Bo "Bosco" Ostroman	
2018	Hotel Artemis	Trojan Nash	
2018	Cagney and Lacey	Detective Romy Dudakowski	TV movie

=== Television ===
Year	Title	Role	Notes
1998	Pacific Blue	Billy	Episode: "Heat of the Moment"
1998	Felicity	R.A. #1	Episode: "Drawing the Line: Part 1"
1999	Walker, Texas Ranger	Teenager	Episode: "The Principal"
1999	Beyond Belief: Fact or Fiction	Johnny Pope	Recurring cast: season 3
1999	Martial Law	Munro	Episode: "Thieves Among Thieves"
1999	G vs E	Buddy	Episode: "Lady Evil"
1999	Nash Bridges	Markus	Episode: "Kill Switch"
2000	The Others	Ethan	Episode: "Eyes"
2000	The District	Ronnie	Episode: "Pot Scrubbers"
2001	ER	Todd	Episode: "The Longer You Stay"
2001	The Guardian	Malcolm Dempsey	Episode: "Feeding Frenzy"
2001	Going to California	David "Ikey" Eichorn	Recurring cast
2003	Joan of Arcadia	Bob Morrison	Episode: "Drive, He Said"
2007-2008	October Road	David "Ikey" Eichorn	Main cast
2008	House	Bill	Episode: "Last Resort"
2009	Dark Blue	Hallsy	Episode: "Venice Kings"
2009	CSI: NY	Junior Mosley	Episode: "Blacklist (Featuring Grave Digger)"
2010	Detroit 1-8-7	Steven Hayes	Episode: "Nobody's Home/Unknown Soldier"
2011	Hawaii Five-0	Sal Groves	Episode: "Ma Ke Kahakai"
2011	Brothers & Sisters	Dan	Recurring cast: season 5
2012	Criminal Minds	Chris Stratton	Episode: "Hit" & "Run"
2013	Perception	Billy Flynn	Episode: "Ch-Ch-Changes"
2014	Houdini	Jim Collins	Episode: "Part 1 & 2"
2015	Backstrom	Eugene Visser	Episode: "Dragon Slayer"
2015	Graceland	Agent Colby Moore	Episode: "Sense Memory" & "Aha"
2015-2016	CSI: Cyber	"Python"	Episode: "Python" & "Python's Revenge"
2017	Santa Clarita Diet	Jevin	Episode: "Attention to Detail"
2017	Midnight, Texas	Peter Lowery	Episode: "Bad Moon Rising" & "Unearthed"
2017	Legends of Tomorrow	Dick Rory	Episode: "Welcome to the Jungle"
2019	Titans	Len Armstrong	Episode: "Fallen"
2020	Next	Ray	Episode: "FILE #9" & "FILE #10"
2025	Duster	Billy Mahoney	Recurring cast
