= Fifty Shades of Black =

2016 film by Michael Tiddes

- Theatrical release poster
- Directed by: Michael Tiddes
- Written by: Marlon Wayans; Rick Alvarez
- Produced by: Marlon Wayans; Rick Alvarez
- Starring: Marlon Wayans; Kali Hawk; Affion Crockett; Fred Willard; Mike Epps
- Cinematography: David Ortkiese
- Edited by: Lawrence Jordan
- Music by: Jim Dooley
- Production companies: IM Global; Baby Way Productions
- Distributed by: Open Road Films
- Release date: January 29, 2016
- Running time: 92 minutes
- Country: United States
- Language: English
- Budget: $5 million
- Box office: $22.2 million

Fifty Shades of Black is a 2016 American slapstick romantic comedy film directed by Michael Tiddes and starring Marlon Wayans, who also serves as co-writer and co-producer. The film is a parody to the 2015 erotic romantic drama film Fifty Shades of Grey. The film co-stars Kali Hawk, Affion Crockett, Jane Seymour, Andrew Bachelor, Florence Henderson, Jenny Zigrino, Fred Willard and Mike Epps.

The film was released theatrically on January 29, 2016, to universally negative reviews. It was a box office success, grossing $22 million worldwide from a $5 million budget.

== Plot ==
Christian Black introduces shy college student Hannah Steale to the world of "romance" after she interviews him for her school newspaper. Their kinky relationship stumbles forward despite Christian's shortcomings as a lover and the antics of his racist adoptive mother Claire, his well-endowed brother Eli and Hannah's hyper-sexual roommate Kateesha.

== Cast ==
- Marlon Wayans as Christian Black
- Kali Hawk as Hannah Steale
- Jenny Zigrino as Kateesha Kavahellnah
- Jane Seymour as Claire Black, Christian's mother
- Fred Willard as Gary Black, Christian's father
- Mike Epps as Ron Steale, Hannah's father
- Irene Choi as Mai Black
- King Bach as Jesse
- Mircea Monroe as Becky
- Affion Crockett as Eli Black
- Kate Miner as Ashley
- Florence Henderson as Mrs. Robinson
- Dave Sheridan as The Great Mysterio
- Russell Peters as Dean Jordan

== Production ==
On June 3, 2015, it was announced that Open Road Films had acquired the US distribution rights to the yet-to-be made film for $5 million.

Principal photography on the film began August 11, 2015, in Los Angeles.

== Release ==
The film was released in North America on January 29, 2016, alongside Kung Fu Panda 3, The Finest Hours, and Jane Got a Gun. The film was projected to gross $10–11 million from 2,075 theaters in its opening weekend. The film grossed $275,000 from its Thursday night previews, $2.3 million on its first day, and $5.9 million in its opening weekend, finishing 10th at the box office. The film was released on DVD and Blu-ray on April 19, 2016.

== Reception ==
=== Critical response ===
On Rotten Tomatoes, the film has an approval rating of 4% based on 46 reviews; the average rating is 2.79/10. The site's consensus reads, "Wildly erratic even for a spoof movie, Fifty Shades of Black bears the unfortunate distinction of offering fewer laughs than the unintentionally funny film it's trying to lampoon." On Metacritic, the film has a score of 28 out of 100 based on 11 critics, indicating "generally unfavorable" reviews. Audiences polled by CinemaScore gave the film an average grade of "C" on an A+ to F scale.

Critic Mark Kermode dismissed Fifty Shades of Black as another lame parody film, among the likes of Scary Movie (2000), Epic Movie (2007) and Vampires Suck (2010). Austin film critic Korey Coleman ended his review by starting an online petition to stop Marlon Wayans from making any more parody films. He gave it the #1 spot for the worst movie of 2016, tying it with Yoga Hosers.

Kermode was critical of the humor: "Cue jokes about wallet and car theft, fried chicken and Bill Cosby, alongside glasshouse/brick complaints about EL James being a rubbish writer. When it all runs out of steam, the cock-and-ball routines downshift into riffs from Whiplash and Magic Mike, but sadly, these aren’t funny either." J.R. Jones condemned the jokes as a set of "amplified racial stereotypes and misogynistic swipes", citing the running gag of male characters calling Hawk's character "ugly", as well as the rape jokes, as examples. Henry Barnes claimed there is a "Cosby joke, a Kanye joke and huge spaces where the laughs should be", particularly arguing that the "abuse is amplified out of the realm of satire into a weird hinterland of really unfunny gross-out and blaxploitation revenge flick".

Jones did, however, highlight the "impressive attention to detail, meticulously re-creating the original film's costumes and sets, and Kali Hawk nails her Dakota Johnson impression as the virginal protagonist".

=== Accolades ===
Award	Category	Recipients	Result	Ref.
Golden Trailer Awards	Best Comedy	"Spanked"	Nominated	
Golden Trailer Awards	Golden Fleece TV Spot	"Shadiest"	Won	
Golden Trailer Awards	Golden Fleece TV Spot	"Book Club"	Nominated	
Golden Raspberry Awards	Worst Prequel, Remake, Rip-off or Sequel	Fifty Shades of Black	Nominated	
Golden Raspberry Awards	Worst Supporting Actress	Jane Seymour	Nominated	

== See also ==
- List of black films of the 2010s
