= Ralph Williams (professor) =

Ralph Williams is a professor emeritus of literature at the University of Michigan, where he taught for 39 years in the university's English Language and Literature Department.

== Early life and education ==
Ralph Williams attended high school at St. Mary's District Collegiate Institute in Ontario before receiving a bachelor's degree at Andrews University in Berrien Springs, Michigan in 1963. Williams completed his graduate education at the University of Michigan, Ann Arbor, where he received a doctor of philosophy degree in 1970. He earned wide acclaim as a student, including Phi Beta Kappa honors.

== Academic career ==
Williams commenced his professional academic career concurrent with his conclusion of PhD studies. This early work involved serving as an assistant professor of English at Cornell University from 1968 to 1970. In 1970, he joined the faculty of the University of Michigan, Ann Arbor, as an assistant professor of English. He became an associate professor in 1974 and served in that capacity until 1993, when he earned full professor of English status. Williams occupied a named chair position, Arthur F. Thurnau Professor of English (1991–1994), as a result of his demonstrated excellence in undergraduate instruction.

Widely recognized for his popularity and influence among students, Williams received the Golden Apple Teaching Award in 1992 on behalf of the student organization Students Honoring Outstanding University Teaching. As the "Arthur F. Thurnau Professor of English," Williams received the 2008 Carnegie Foundation for Advancement of Teaching Michigan Professor of the Year. In 2009, students presented "the first-ever Lifetime Achievement Golden Apple Award" to Williams near the end of his formal career.

An American comedy film released in 2011, Answer This!, featured Williams acting as a cinematic character of his own professor persona. Williams last reported his intention for retirement as spending "part of each year abroad in London and part in Ann Arbor to pursue writing projects and continue working with the Royal Shakespeare Company, a theatrical ensemble." Michigan's Department of English Language and Literature launched the "The Ralph Williams Excellence in Teaching Award" to sustain Williams' influence by highlighting faculty members who inspire students in the same manner.
