= Answer This! =

- Theatrical release poster
- Directed by: Christopher Farah
- Screenplay by: Christopher Farah
- Produced by: Mike Farah; Anna Wenger
- Starring: Christopher Gorham; Arielle Kebbel; Nelson Franklin; Evan Jones; Kip Pardue; Kali Hawk; Ralph Williams (professor); Chris Parnell
- Cinematography: Christian Sprenger
- Edited by: Wendy Nomiyama
- Music by: John Paesano
- Production companies: NECA Films; 3, 4 Women Productions
- Distributed by: Wrekin Hill Entertainment
- Release date: October 13, 2011 (United States)
- Running time: 100 minutes
- Country: United States
- Language: English

Answer This! is an American 2011 comedy film written and directed by Christopher Farah and starring Christopher Gorham, Arielle Kebbel, Nelson Franklin, Evan Jones, Kip Pardue, Kali Hawk, Ralph Williams, and Chris Parnell.

== Cast ==
- Christopher Gorham as Paul Tarson
- Arielle Kebbel as Naomi
- Chris Parnell as Brian Collins
- Kip Pardue as Lucas Brannstrom
- Nelson Franklin as James Koogly
- Evan Jones as Izzy 'Ice' Dasselway
- Kali Hawk as Shelly
- Ralph Williams as Dr. Elliot Tarson
- Michael Sinterniklaas as Umlatt the Flunkee

== Production ==
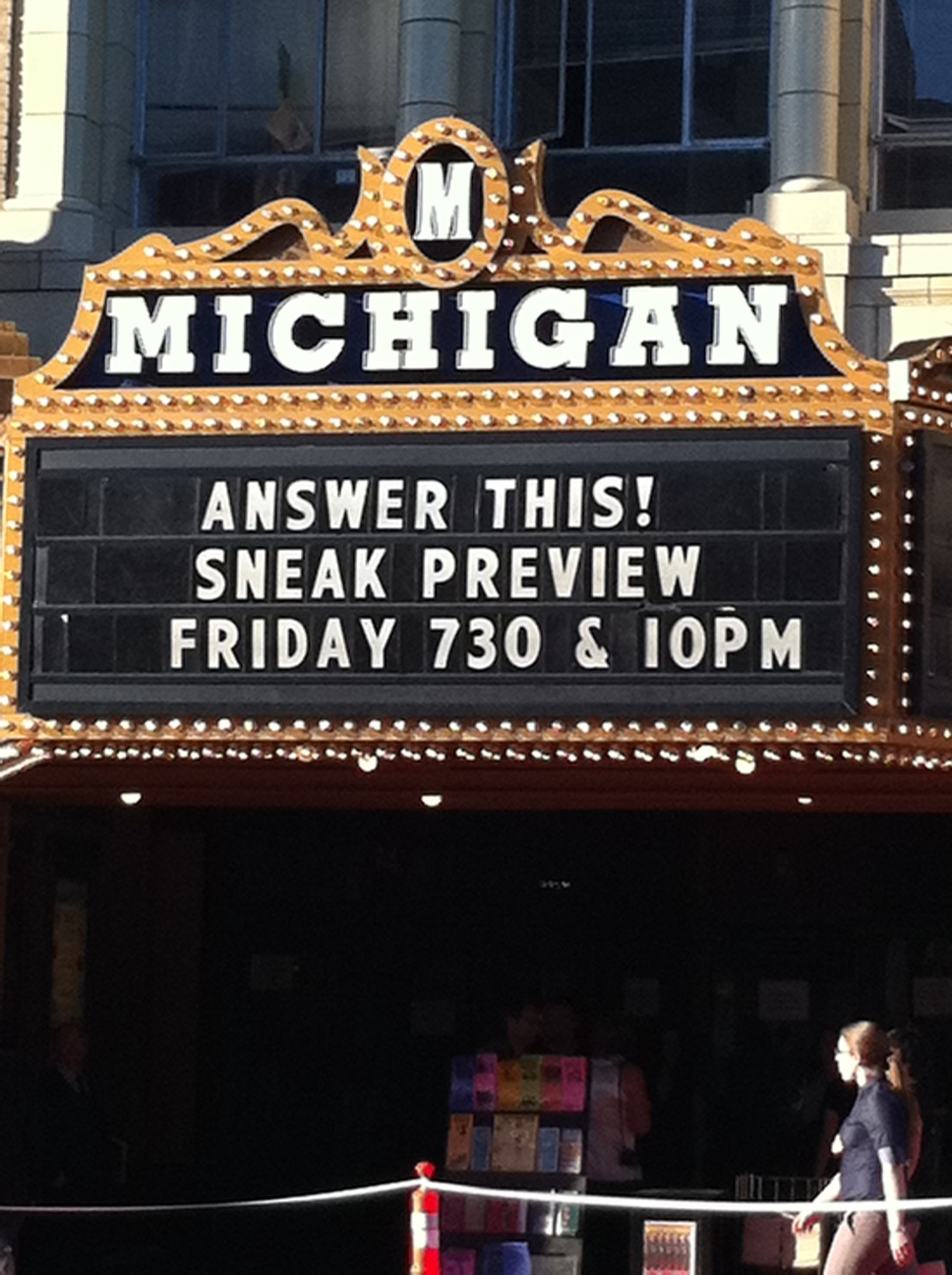
Marquee of the Michigan Theater in Ann Arbor advertising a preview screening of the film

The film was primarily filmed in Ann Arbor, Michigan and is set at the University of Michigan; it is the first film to have been filmed closely in cooperation with the University.

The film features many notable locations around the city of Ann Arbor, as well as the University of Michigan. The locations include Ashley's, Zingerman's Delicatessen, the University of Michigan Law Quad, Saint Thomas School, Michigan Stadium, the Diag, the Michigan League, Nickels Arcade, the Ann Arbor Farmer's Market, Barton Pond and the Barton Hills area, Washtenaw Dairy, Espresso Royale, Eight Ball Saloon, and the Michigan Union.

== Reception ==
On Detroit News, Tom Long rated it "B" writing that "Ann Arbor has never been more lovingly embraced and portrayed."
