= Smile...You're Under Arrest! =

2008 reality television series

- Genre: Reality television
- Country of origin: United States
- Original language: English
- No. of seasons: 1
- No. of episodes: 3

Production
- Executive producer: Scott Satin
- Production locations: Los Angeles, California
- Running time: 30 minutes

Original release
- Network: Fox Reality Channel
- Release: December 27, 2008 – January 10, 2009

Smile...You're Under Arrest! is a reality television series on the Fox Reality Channel. On the show, individuals with outstanding felony warrants are lured into police custody using various fake scenarios.

The series consisted of 3 episodes, the first of which aired on December 27, 2008. The show was mentioned on episode 23 of the 4th season of Last Week Tonight with John Oliver.

== Format ==
The show describes itself as a cross between Cops and Punk'd, setting up elaborate sting operations to snare people wanted on outstanding warrants. These sting operations include opportunities for felons to work as an extra on a movie set or as a model in a fashion shoot, among others. Once the trap is set and the actors have had their fun with the unsuspecting criminals, police officers arrest and take them to jail.

All of the cases featured in Smile...You’re Under Arrest! involved the Maricopa County Sheriff’s Department of Phoenix, AZ under the command of Sheriff Joe Arpaio, who was known as “The Toughest Sheriff in America”. He had a reputation for unusual law enforcement tactics such as re-instituting chain gangs, housing prisoners in a desert “tent city” and forcing them to wear pink underwear. Sheriff Joe Arpaio lost his re-election campaign in 2016; his last day in office was January 1, 2017.

The persons lured into the elaborate ruses are all nonviolent persons with outstanding warrants for low-level crimes. Arpaio claimed that these stings provided a unique service to his community. Detractors said this was simple self-aggrandizement on the part of Arpaio resulting in no improvement in public safety.

== Cast ==
1. Sheriff Joe Arpaio
2. Diana Terranova
3. David Storrs
4. Tori Meyer
5. Dave Sheridan

== Episodes ==
No.	Title	Original release date	US viewers (millions)
1	"Operation Fashion Show"	December 27, 2008	N/A
Wanted fugitives are asked to model clothing for a fashion show as part of an elaborate sting operation. The fugitives are told that they are modeling clothes from a new line called "Average Guy Fashions" or "Average Girl Fashions." After trying a couple of outfits, they are then asked to model the line's new Halloween outfit, a jail uniform. Upon doing so, they are arrested.
2	"Operation Movie Star"	January 3, 2009	N/A
Wanted fugitives are lured to a fake movie set with the promise of $300. Transported by the "J.L. Thyme" limo service ("jail time"), they are asked to participate as extras in a pretend film, The Lime Green Line (a play on the phrase "The Thin Blue Line"), described as a prison film intended to be more kid-friendly. During the supposed filming, Storrs messes up his lines and Sheridan, the director, asks the fugitive to step in and play the lead role instead. Dressed in a prison outfit, the actor is asked to recite lines such as "If I knew I had a warrant, I'd have taken care of it," before being handcuffed to the prison bars of the set. Everyone else then leaves before returning to tell the fugitive that they are on a prank show, then revealing the twist that they are actually under arrest. In one instance, the crew discovered that the person that they had lured was not actually the fugitive in question, but someone who had stolen that individual's identity. They then arrested that individual after discovering he had a warrant for his arrest as well.
3	"Operation Spa Promotion"	January 10, 2009	N/A
Wanted fugitives are led to believe they have won the VIP treatment at a new spa called “J. L. Spa”. After completing yoga and various relaxation services, a group of deputy sheriffs arrest them in the middle of a facial. Sheridan poses as spa owner "Skip Townes" and the spa's name is intended as a joking reference to "jail." The presence of cameras is explained to the fugitives as being part of a promotional video being shot for the spa. They are occasionally told to say things for the cameras, such as "I always look and feel my best when I'm in J.L. ... Spa."
