= Kali Hawk =

American jewelry designer (born 1986)

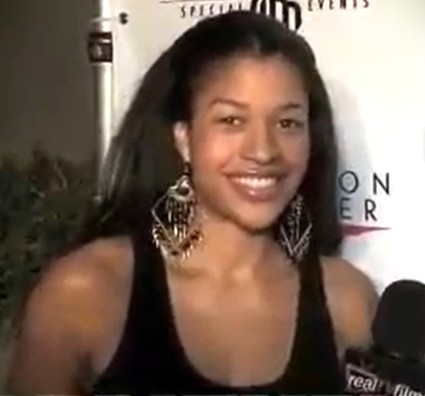
- Hawk in 2008
- Born: October 4, 1986 (age 39)
- Occupations: Actress, comedian, model, jewelry designer
- Years active: 1998–present

Kali Hawk (born October 4, 1986) is an American actress, comedian, model and jewelry designer. She has starred in films such as Fifty Shades of Black, Couples Retreat, Bridesmaids and Tyler Perry Presents Peeples. She recurred as Shelby in New Girl and co-starred in the first two seasons of the Adult Swim series Black Jesus.

== Life and career ==
Hawk was raised in Manhattan. Her father was in merchandising and her mother was a buyer for Bloomingdale's. She is of African-American, Native American, and German Jewish ancestry.

She has appeared in several commercials and music videos, and she competed in the fifth season of Last Comic Standing in 2007.

Hawk has appeared in numerous comedy films, including Couples Retreat, Get Him to the Greek, Bridesmaids, Peeples, Answer This! and Fifty Shades of Black.

In 2012, Hawk was added to the cast of the In Living Color reboot pilot, which did not go forward. She also recurred in the sitcom New Girl as Shelby.

In 2019, Hawk was added to the cast of the ABC television series Schooled playing Wilma, a science teacher who was poached from an elite school to teach at William Penn Academy, but she was ultimately replaced by Haneefah Wood before appearing in an episode

== Filmography ==
=== Film ===
Year	Title	Role	Notes
1998	Celebrity	Popcorn Girl	
2004	Mighty Times: The Children's March	Lenore	Documentary short
2005	Gotham Cafe	Party Guest	Short
2005	Issues	Waitress	
2006	Where Is Love Waiting	Faith	
2006	I Can See Clearly Now	Anara	
2006	Holla	Caprices	
2007	Lovers & Haters	The One	Short
2007	Caregiver	Tania	Video
2008	Killer Sound	-	Short
2009	Pushing Thirty	Rio	Video
2009	Couples Retreat	Trudy	
2010	Get Him to the Greek	Kali	
2010	The Fuzz	Officer Thompson	TV movie
2011	Bridesmaids	Kahlua	
2011	Answer This!	Shelly	
2011	Black and Jewish (Black and Yellow Parody)	Herself	Short
2011	Answers to Nothing	Allegra	
2011	Let Go	Angela	
2013	Peeples	Gloria Peeples	
2013	In the Meantime	Jazz	TV movie
2013	Another Happy Anniversary	Susan	Short
2013	Little Horribles	-	Short
2015	November Rule	Theresa	
2015	The Summoning	Ruth	
2015	Welcome to the Family	Stella	TV movie
2015	A Light Beneath Their Feet	Julie	
2016	Fifty Shades of Black	Hannah Steale	
2016	The Perfect Match	Karen	
2016	The Bounce Back	Jessica Williams	
2018	White Chocolate	Anara Tomai	
2018	The Truth About Christmas	Jillian	TV movie
2019	I Am Easy to Find	Co-Worker	Short
2020	Fatale	Micaela	

=== Television ===
Year	Title	Role	Notes
2005	Untold Stories of the E.R.	L. Montana EMT	Episode: "Motorcycle Runs Over"
2006	Bill Bellamy's Who's Got Jokes?	Model	Episode: "Warm It Up in LA"
2008	Jimmy Kimmel Live!	Nurse	Episode: "6.94"
2008	The Game	Female Party Goer	Episode: "The Lord Givens and the Lord Taketh Away"
2011	Are We There Yet?	Danielle	Episode: "The Play Dates Episode"
2012	NTSF:SD:SUV::	Minutes	Episode: "Time Angels"
2012	New Girl	Shelby	Recurring cast: Season 1-2
2012–13	Let's Stay Together	Connie	Recurring cast: season 2, guest: season 3
2013	Inside Amy Schumer	Hunter	Episode: "Sex Tips"
2014	Psych	Emanuelle	Episode: "Cog Blocked"
2014–15	Black Jesus	Maggie	Main cast: season 1-2
2015	The Game	Sonja Allen	Episode: "Acting Class and Rebound Ass"
2016	Real Husbands of Hollywood	Herself	Episodes: "#HollywoodTooBlack Part 1 & 2"
2017	The Mayor	Amber	Recurring cast
2017–2019	OK K.O.! Let's Be Heroes	Red Action (voice)	Recurring cast
