= Next at the Kennedy Center =

American performing arts television series

- Country of origin: United States
- Original language: English
- No. of seasons: 1
- No. of episodes: 5

Production
- Producer: The Kennedy Center

Original release
- Network: PBS
- Release: October 14, 2022 – December 31, 2024

Next at the Kennedy Center is a new PBS television series which produces episodes that present and contextualize performances at The Kennedy Center. These episodes spotlight "cultural leaders from the worlds of hip hop, jazz, folk, comedy, modern dance and more." It is produced by the Kennedy Center. The show debuted on PBS on October 14, 2022, with the episode "Let My Children Hear Mingus".

Groups or organizations featured or retrospectively featured include: Charles Mingus, Joni Mitchell, The Roots, Jason Moran and Christian McBride. Five episodes have been produced in the first season.

The series is planned for fifteen episodes over three years.

== Critical reception ==
Current.org "News for People in Public Media" noted that the series: "aims to show the country what a broad spectrum of arts cross its stages." It then went on to summarize the goals of the series.

The Wall Street Journal started their review of the second episode by noting that the episode "offers a tribute to Ms. Mitchell as well as a bit of misdirection." . This review generally enjoyed the performances but wished that Joni herself was in it, praising the performances of Raul Midón and Lalah Hathaway.

The Philly Voice noted about the third episode: 'the group performed hits like "Act Too (The Love Of My Life)" from their 1999 album, "Things Fall Apart."'

NJ.com "True Jersey" also noted about the third episode: "Finally, The Roots are getting the recognition they deserve." It also noted that this was The Roots "first-ever national television special."

KPBS also noted about the third episode: 'The episode also includes moments from "Music is History" ', which is band-leader Questlove's new book.

DC Theater Arts noted about the fourth episode: "The illuminating discussions consider the significance of Doña Perón," while giving the opportunity for "artists of Latinx heritage to reclaim the narrative ..."

BroadwayWorld noted about the fifth episode that "Moran and McBride's collaboration is infused with a distinctive soul."

== Episodes ==
No. overall	No. in season	Title	Directed by	Written by	Original release date
1	1	"Let My Children Hear Mingus"	Kristin Fosdick	Kirstin Fosdick, Steven Holtzman, Matthew Winer	October 14, 2022
Retrospective performance to celebrate 100 years since Charles Mingus's birth.
2	2	"A Joni Mitchell Songbook"	Kristin Fosdick	Kirstin Fosdick, Steven Holtzman, Matthew Winer	November 18, 2022
A celebration of Joni Mitchell with the National Symphony Orchestra.
3	3	"The Roots Residency"	Kristin Fosdick	Kirstin Fosdick, Steven Holtzman, Matthew Winer	January 27, 2023
The Roots give a performance and interviews.
4	4	"Ballet Hispánico's Doña Perón"	Nel Shelby	Kirstin Fosdick, Steven Holtzman, Matthew Winer	April 14, 2023
Ballet Hispánico explores Evita Peron's life and legacy.
5	5	"Continuum: Jason Moran & Christian McBride"	Kirstin Fosdick	Kirstin Fosdick, Steven Holtzman, Matthew Winer	April 21, 2023
Icons Jason Moran and Christian McBride share stories.
