= Dave Sheridan (actor) =

American actor

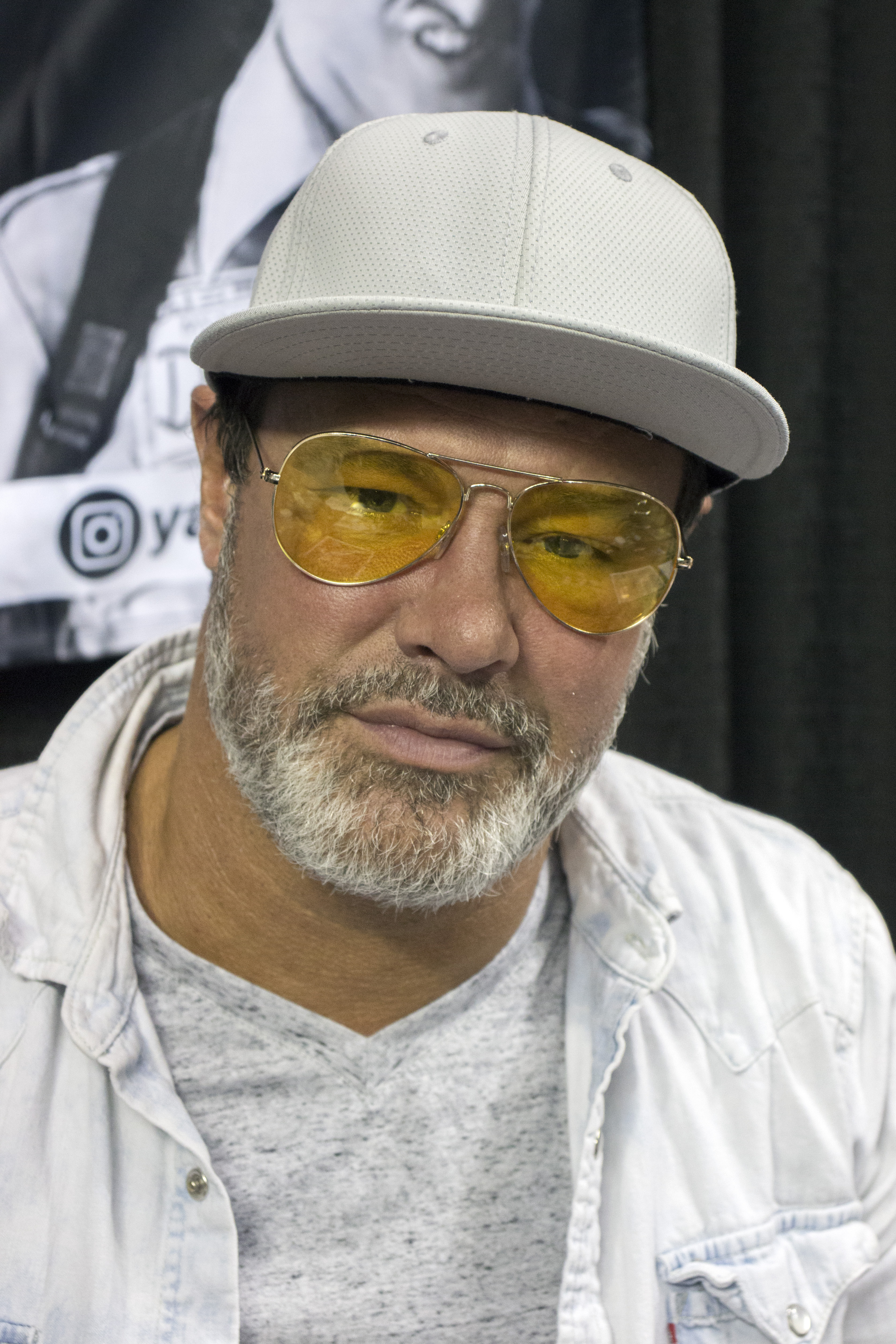
- Sheridan in 2023
- Born: March 10, 1969 (age 57); Newark, Delaware
- Occupations: Actor; comedian; producer; writer
- Years active: 1996–present

Dave Sheridan is an American actor. He is best known for playing Special Officer Doofy, a spoof of deputy sheriff Dewey Riley from Scream (1996), as well as providing the voice of the titular killer Ghostface, in the comedy Scary Movie (2000).

== Career ==
He began his career as an intern at Saturday Night Live during the 1991–1992 season. From there, he entered Chicago's comedy troupe The Second City, where he wrote, directed, and produced "Dave Sheridan's America", a multimedia stage show. He starred on Buzzkill, a 1996 MTV reality series that featured three slacker buddies staging elaborate pranks and catching it on video.

Sheridan appeared in Scary Movie (2000) as Officer Doofy. He portrayed the character Doug in the 2001 film Ghost World. Sheridan appeared in the 2002 music videos for "By the Way" (playing a crazy taxi driver) and "Universally Speaking" by Red Hot Chili Peppers. Sheridan toured with his band that formed in 2004, Van Stone.

Sheridan hosted a series called Smile...You're Under Arrest! on the Fox Reality Channel in 2008–09. In 2014, he portrayed Sheriff Lincoln in the parody film The Walking Deceased, inspired by The Walking Dead.

In 2016, Sheridan started co-hosting The Dave and Creech Show podcast with actor/podcaster CJ Creech.

== Filmography ==
=== Film ===
Year	Title	Role	Notes
1998	Short Cinema		Direct-to-video
2000	Scary Movie	Doofy Gilmore / The Killer (voice)	
2001	The Det. Kent Stryker One-Man Film	Detective Lee	
2001	Corky Romano	Agent Terrence Darnell	
2001	Bubble Boy	Mark	
2001	Ghost World	Doug Gormley	
2002	Frank McKlusky, C.I.	Frank McKlusky	Also story
2003	The Fighting Temptations	Bill	
2005	The Devil's Rejects	Officer Ray Dobson	
2006	Little Man	Rosco	
2008	Stone & Ed	Man in the Yellow Hat	
2008	Sex Drive	Bobby Jo	
2008	Your Name Here	IRS Agent Duke	
2009	All's Faire in Love	Jester Roy/Horny	
2011	Horrible Bosses	Bradford's Bar Bartender	
2013	A Haunted House	Bob	
2013	Dealin' with Idiots	Forrest	
2014	A Haunted House 2	Aghoul	
2014	With You	Dr. Little	Short
2015	The Walking Deceased	Sheriff Lincoln	Also producer
2016	Fifty Shades of Black	The Great Mysterio	
2017	Naked	Officer Mike Bentley	
2017	Handsome	Chuck Looney	
2017	Victor Crowley	Dillon	
2017	Orient City: Ronin and the Princess	Bosshi	Short
2018	Beyond White Space	Stubniski	
2020	Spy Intervention	Rick	
2020	Sky Sharks	Kifo Mleta	Uncredited
2021	The Resort	Detective	
2021	Something in the Woods	David Walker	Short
2022	Bloody Summer Camp	Sheriff Wilmore	
2022	The Curse of Bridge Hollow	Farmer Brown	
2024	Stream	Mark	
2024	The Keepers of the 5 Kingdoms	Hank The Rooster	
2026	Bloody Summer Camp 2: Red Horizon	Sheriff Wilmore	
2026	Scary Movie	Doofy Gilmore / Ghostface (voice)	

=== Television ===
Year	Title	Roles	Notes
1996	Buzzkill	Various	TV series; also creator
2003	Windy City Heat	Travis Bickle	Television movie
2003	Grounded for Life	Jack	Episode: "SAT and Sympathy"
2003	Scare Tactics	Various characters	1 episode
2004	Game Over	Alonzo/Eskimo/Annoucer	Episode: "Basic Win-stincts"
2006	Free Ride	Dove	6 episodes
2006	Van Stone: Tour of Duty	Randy Van Stone	Television movie; also, writer and executive producer
2006	Gay Robot	Wade	Pilot
2007	Canoga Park	Private First Class Steven Sheridan	Episode: "Judy's Comeback"
2008-2009	Smile...You're Under Arrest!	Host	Reality TV series
2010	Zeke and Luther	Dino Coletti	Episode: "Goin' Zoomin'"
2011	Robot Chicken	Sarge/Lego NASA Spokesman	Episode: "Kramer vs. Showgirls"
2011	Nick Swardson's Pretend Time	Sex Change Lady	Episode: "The Mis-Education of Garry Gaga"
2013	A Terrible Beauty	Red Cross Official	Television movie
2016	Hidden America with Jonah Ray	Phil	Episode: "Atlanta: Past, Present, Living and Dead"
2021-2024	The Last Drive-in with Joe Bob Briggs	Himself/Steve Wilcow/Judo Expert	3 episodes

=== Web series ===
Year	Title	Roles	Notes
2012	Geek & Sundry	Kendall	Episode: "Written by a Kid: Kendall the Knight"
2024	Meat the Carvers	Trevor/Cousin Larry	2 episodes
2026	Jaydaddy	Doofy Gilmore/Ghostface	Episode: "You're in Scary Movie (Halloween Special)"

=== Music videos ===
Year	Title	Role	Artist
2002	By the Way	Taxi Driver	Red Hot Chilli Peppers
2003	Universally Speaking	Taxi Driver	Red Hot Chilli Peppers
