= Dolphin Island (film) =

2021 family movie by Mike Disa

- Directed by: Mike Disa
- Written by: Shaked Berenson; Rolfe Kanefsky; Mike Disa
- Produced by: Shaked Berenson
- Starring: Peter Woodward; Tyler Jade Nixon; Dionne Lea Williams; Bob Bledsoe; Aaron Burrows; Annette Lovrien Duncan; David Raizor
- Cinematography: Shaun Hart
- Edited by: Steven C. Miller
- Music by: Chase Horseman
- Production company: Mr. Puppy Presents
- Distributed by: Entertainment Squad
- Release date: 2 March 2021
- Running time: 88 minutes
- Countries: The Bahamas; United States
- Language: English

Dolphin Island is a 2021 English family drama film directed by Mike Disa. The film follows an orphan teenager and her pet dolphin.

== Plot ==
10 years after losing her parents David and Debrah in a diving accident, 14-year-old Annabel Coleridge lives with her paternal fisherman grandfather, Jonah Coleridge, on an island paradise. Since she was 5, Annabel's best friend has been the local town dolphin named Mitzy which she and her family saved from potential captivity. Annabel helps her grandfather on his fishing boat and in his shop when she's not at school.

All that changes when Samuel and Sheryl Williams, Annabel's maternal grandparents, show up with their lawyer, Robert Carbunkle. They live in New York and want to take custody of Annabel, giving her the life she never had or could afford, or so they say; but Jonah refuses as he believes they only care about themselves. This is certainly true for Samuel.

When Desaray Rolle, a social worker, moves to the island with her 13 year old son, Mateo, romance is soon in the air for both Jonah and Annabel. However, Desaray's initial report of Annabel's living conditions threatens to pull everyone apart when Carbunkle gets his hands on it. Meanwhile, Sheryl speaks with Annabel about her mother and her conflict with Samuel; Debrah used to work with UNICO until she met David and fell in love with him. Jonah was happy for them but not Samuel, as he cared more about her career than her romance and saw David as more of a threat so he tried to break them up, but Debrah refused and eventually left her parents to be with David. They later married, gave birth to Annabel, and opened a sea rescue center on the same island. Sheryl gives Annabel her mother's necklace to remind her to do what makes her happy.

Although Jonah tries hard to explain his care for Annabel, at a court hearing, Carbunkle also claims that Jonah and Desaray were having an affair earlier which undermines Jonah's credibility. At this point, the judge awards temporary custody to Samuel and Sheryl Williams much to the sadness of Annabel and her foster family, including Mitzy. But before Annabel is forced to leave, Mateo gives her his hat to remember him by.

Desaray interferes and explains that they have ruined their granddaughter's life by dragging her away from everyone she loves, questioning their abilities as family. Disturbed and betrayed, Annabel runs away and steals a speed boat. Sheryl relents at their decision and convinces Samuel to respect and support Annabel's choices so they don't repeat the mistake they made with Debrah. The whole town is looking for Annabel, thus proving to the Williams how much they love her and provide Annabel with a caring home. Unfortunately, the boat Annabel stole was still in repair and eventually caught on fire. Mitzy manages to find Annabel and inform the town of her whereabouts. When Desaray chews out Carbunkle for his actions causing all of this, he confesses his corruption to the judge and convinces him to return custody of Annabel to Jonah. Annabel's foster family finds her on the burning speed boat and she is forced to jump overboard. Mitzy and Jonah save Annabel from drowning and she embraces Jonah. Then Samuel and Sheryl reconcile with Annabel and officially make peace with Jonah, stating that Annabel has grown up and already has what is best for her. The movie ends with the town celebrating Annabel's return, including Mitzy and a now reformed Carbunkle.

== Cast ==
- Peter Woodward as Jonah Coleridge
- Tyler Jade Nixon as Annabel Coleridge
- Dionne Lea Williams as Desaray Rolle
- Bob Bledsoe as Robert Carbunkle
- Aaron Burrows as Mateo Rolle
- Annette Lovrien Duncan as Sheryl Williams
- David Raizor as Samuel Williams

== Reception ==
The film has received positive reviews and approved for all ages by The Dove Foundation, which called Dolphin Island "a heartwarming tale of love and accountability, will be entertaining for the whole family." Bradley Gibson of Film Threat gave a positive review, calling the film "an escapist fantasy kids movie with beautiful Caribbean island scenery. It serves as light entertainment with a message." The Coalition for Quality Children's Media, Kids First, gave Dolphin Island 5 out of 5 stars and "recommend it for ages 7 to 18, plus adults. It is definitely family friendly and highlights the importance of family. Anna sets a good example of a child who is caring and loving." The film was embraced by the Christian film industry, winning Best Feature Film at the Christian Film Festival.

== Release ==
On March 2, 2021, the film was released on demand by Entertainment Squad.
