= In the Flow with Affion Crockett =

- The show's title card
- Genre: Improv sketch comedy
- Created by: Affion Crockett; Jamie Foxx
- Written by: Affion Crockett
- Directed by: Rusty Cundieff (Sketches)
- Starring: Affion Crockett
- Country of origin: United States
- Original language: English
- No. of seasons: 1
- No. of episodes: 6

Production
- Executive producers: Fax Bahr; Jamie Foxx; Mitchell Hurwitz; Adam Small; Jaime Rucker King; Marcus King; Eric Tannenbaum; Kim Tannenbaum; Todd Yasui
- Producer: Affion Crockett
- Cinematography: Jon Tucker; David Ortkiese; Bill Sheehy
- Editors: Rick Kent; Bari Winter; Cheryl Campsmith; Kurt Heydle
- Running time: 30 minutes
- Production companies: Foxx/King Entertainment; Tantamount Studios; Fox Television Studios

Original release
- Network: Fox
- Release: August 14 – September 11, 2011

In the Flow with Affion Crockett is a sketch comedy television series starring Affion Crockett and produced by Jamie Foxx, Fax Bahr and Adam Small, Mitch Hurwitz and Eric and Kim Tannenbaum.

Taped in the middle of 2010, it was picked up as a mid-season replacement by Fox in September 2010, under the name "Untitled Jamie Foxx Project". A premiere was announced for June 9, 2011, and then moved to August. It debuted in an hour-long premiere on August 14, 2011, with four half-hour episodes to air on following weeks. The show was cancelled due to low ratings after airing six episodes.

== Premise ==
Affion Crockett (known for his role on Wild 'n Out) got his own sketch comedy show on FOX. As he brings it to primetime as he uses his impressions, rapping, comedic skills to make this show "in the Flow"

== Episodes ==
No.	Title	Directed by	Written by	Original release date	Prod. code	U.S. viewers (millions)
1	"Pass the Torch"	Unknown	Unknown	August 14, 2011	TBA	N/A
Affion impersonates Jay-Z in the opening sketch, Tiger Woods in a golf course sketch, and Chris Rock and Drake in an American Idol sketch. Other sketched include "Wake-Up Call". Samuel L. Jackson guest stars. Affion also performs a sketch that he originally posted on the Internet titled "Hustles with the Russells" co-starring Russell Simmons. Guest stars: Samuel L. Jackson and Russell Simmons
2	"Put the Kids to Bed"	Unknown	Unknown	August 14, 2011	TBA	N/A
The episode opens with Affion breakdancing with some kids. Affion performs a sketch spooking skinny jeans titled "Skinny Paint". Snoop Dogg guest stars in an Avatar spoof sketch involving marijuana. Guest star: Snoop Dogg
3	"Two Kings of Pop"	Unknown	Unknown	August 21, 2011	TBA	N/A
Affion does a tribute of Michael Jackson by dressing like him and dancing, but then Chris Brown makes a surprise appearance dressed as Michael too, so Affion challenges Chris to a "Michael-Off", which Chris wins. Guest star: Chris Brown
4	"NBA Crock Out"	Unknown	Unknown	August 28, 2011	TBA	N/A
Affion impersonates Joe Jackson as he says he is selling products in tribute to Michael Jackson with a tour called the "This Is It for Sure Tour". Affion performs a sketch involving a church pastor/gospel singer promoting his album at a funeral, followed by a sketch titled "Bertha Control". Affion performs as the character of his cousin "Cornbread Crockett" as he annoys celebrities and meets Michael Strahan at a gym. This is followed by game show sketch titled "Put That on Something". This is followed by a second sketch involving "Cornbread Crockett", this time meeting Michael again at a basketball court. Affion then ends the show with a spoof trailer for a sequel to I Am Legend. Guest star: Michael Strahan
5	"Glee Auditions"	Unknown	Unknown	September 4, 2011	TBA	N/A
In a sketch titled "Glee Auditions" Affion introduces Harry Shum Jr. from Glee, who thinks Affion should audition for Glee. Affion shows some of his moves and Harry thinks they should do some country line dancing. Lil' C enters to dance with them and he also judges how Affion dances. Affion impersonates Russell Simmons in a "Hustles with the Russells" sketch. Guest star: Harry Shum Jr.
6	"No Rush!"	Unknown	Unknown	September 11, 2011	TBA	N/A
The series finale opens with Affion impersonating Chris Rock. Other sketches include one about a light-skinned teenager titled "Hilight: The Yellow Moon" (a parody of Twilight).
