= Marlon Wayans =

American actor and producer (born 1972)

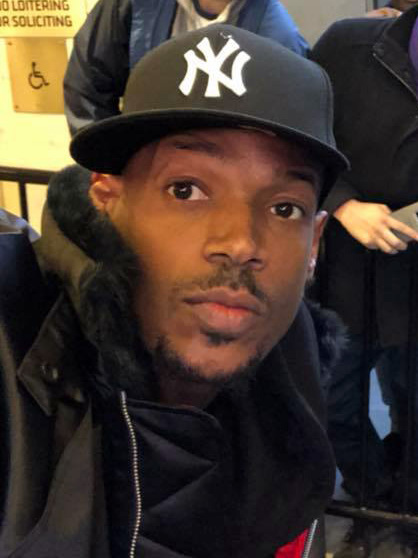
- Wayans in 2018
- Born: Marlon Lamont Wayans; July 23, 1972 (age 54); New York City, U.S.
- Occupations: Actor; comedian; writer; producer
- Years active: 1988–present
- Partner: Angela Zackery (1992–2013)
- Children: 3
- Relatives: Dwayne Wayans (brother); Keenen Ivory Wayans (brother); Damon Wayans (brother); Kim Wayans (sister); Shawn Wayans (brother); Damon Wayans Jr. (nephew)
- Family: Wayans family

Marlon Lamont Wayans (/ˈweɪ.ənz/ WAY-ənz; born July 23, 1972) is an American actor, comedian, writer, and producer. He is best known for his work with his brother Shawn Wayans on The WB sitcom The Wayans Bros. (1995–1999) and the comedy films Don't Be a Menace (1996), Scary Movie (2000), Scary Movie 2 (2001), White Chicks (2004), Little Man (2006), Dance Flick (2009), and Scary Movie (2026).

Wayans' other film credits include Above the Rim (1994), The 6th Man (1997), Norbit (2007), G.I. Joe: The Rise of Cobra (2009), The Heat (2013), A Haunted House (2013) and its sequel A Haunted House 2 (2014), Naked (2017), Fifty Shades of Black (2016), Sextuplets (2019), and On the Rocks (2020). He also had several dramatic roles, including the psychological drama film Requiem for a Dream (2000), the biographical musical drama Respect (2021), and the supernatural horror Him (2025).

Wayans partnered with Randy Adams to create What the Funny, an online destination for urban comedy. He created the comedy competition television show Funniest Wins, which aired on TBS in 2014. In 2014, Wayans and his brothers traveled the United States with "The Wayans Brothers Tour". In 2017, he co-wrote and starred in the NBC sitcom Marlon, which ran for two seasons.

== Early life ==
Wayans was born in New York City, the son of Elvira Alethia (Green), a homemaker and social worker, and Howell Stouten Wayans, a supermarket manager. He was raised in Fulton Houses, a housing project in New York City, the youngest of ten siblings. He is the brother of Dwayne, Keenen Ivory, Damon Sr., Kim, Elvira, Nadia, and Shawn. His family were Jehovah's Witnesses. Wayans went to Fiorello H. LaGuardia High School of Music & Art and Performing Arts in New York City, the school made famous in Fame. After graduating from high school, he attended Howard University in Washington, D.C., but dropped out after two years.

== Career ==
Between 1992 and 1993, Wayans appeared with his siblings on the sketch comedy show In Living Color. From 1995 until 1999, he co-starred in the WB sitcom The Wayans Bros. with his brother Shawn Wayans. He was originally considered for the role of Robin in the 1992 film Batman Returns, but it was felt that the film featured too many characters, so his character was omitted. Wayans was then formally signed to the role in the 1995 sequel Batman Forever to play opposite Billy Dee Williams as Two-Face, but the mid-production change in directors from Tim Burton to Joel Schumacher resulted in both parts being recast and Wayans being paid out (Williams was not yet signed on, but received a penalty fee as his contract for Batman allowed him the option of reprise), and he still receives royalty payments. He was replaced by Chris O'Donnell. In August 2021, a comic book adaptation of the original concept, Batman '89, began publication, by DC Entertainment, using Wayans's likeness for Robin with his permission, their civilian identity renamed Drake Winston.

Wayons film roles include the comedies Don't Be a Menace (1996), Scary Movie (2000), Scary Movie 2 (2001), White Chicks (2004), Little Man (2006), Dance Flick (2009), and Scary Movie (2026), and other films including Above the Rim (1994), The 6th Man (1997), Norbit (2007), G.I. Joe: The Rise of Cobra (2009), The Heat (2013), A Haunted House (2013) and its sequel A Haunted House 2 (2014), Naked (2017), Fifty Shades of Black (2016), Sextuplets (2019), and On the Rocks (2020). Wayans produced the first two films of the Scary Movie series, in which he and Shawn were credited writers and co-stars, and returned to the same duties in the sixth film of the series. In 2000, he appeared as Tyrone C. Love in Requiem for a Dream and as Snails in Dungeons & Dragons. That same year, he and Shawn hosted the 2000 MTV Video Music Awards.

In 2006, Wayans produced the Nickelodeon cartoon series Thugaboo. In 2017, NBC gave him his own sitcom, Marlon; it was canceled after two seasons.

In September 2017, Variety announced that Wayans would partner with LA-based entertainment company Shots Studios to launch a YouTube channel. He has appeared in videos alongside creators such as Anwar Jibawi and Hannah Stocking. In 2020, Wayans signed a deal with HBO Max.

== Personal life ==
Wayans was in a long-term relationship with Angela Zackery from 1992 to 2013, and although he once called her his "ex-wife", he said in 2021 that he had never married. They have two sons, Kai Wayans (born Amai Zackery Wayans on May 24, 2000) and Shawn Howell Wayans (born February 3, 2002), with Kai identifying as transgender. In 2023, Wayans expressed support for Kai and the LGBTQ community. Wayans shares daughter (Axl July Ivory Wayans, born December 2022) with his former girlfriend, Brittany Moreland. Wayans was a close friend of rapper Tupac Shakur. He is also a longtime friend of actor Omar Epps.

== Filmography ==
Key
†	Denotes productions that have not yet been released

=== Film ===
Year	Movie	Character	Notes
1988	I'm Gonna Git You Sucka	Pedestrian	
1992	Mo' Money	Seymour Stewart	
1994	Above the Rim	Bugaloo	
1996	Don't Be a Menace to South Central While Drinking Your Juice in the Hood	Loc Dog	Also co-writer
1997	The 6th Man	Kenny Tyler	
1998	Senseless	Darryl Witherspoon	
2000	Requiem for a Dream	Tyrone C. Love	
2000	Scary Movie	Shorty Meeks	Also co-writer
2000	The Tangerine Bear	Louie Blue	Voice; direct-to-video
2000	Dungeons & Dragons	Snails	
2001	Scary Movie 2	Shorty Meeks	Also co-writer
2004	The Ladykillers	Gawain MacSam	
2004	White Chicks	Marcus Anthony Copeland II / Tiffany Wilson	Also co-writer and producer
2006	Behind the Smile	Danny Styles	
2006	Little Man	Calvin "Baby-face" Sims	Also co-writer and producer
2007	Norbit	Buster "Bust-A-Move" Perkin	
2009	Dance Flick	Mr Moody	Also co-writer and producer
2009	G.I. Joe: The Rise of Cobra	Rip Cord	
2010	Marmaduke	Lightning	Voice
2013	A Haunted House	Malcolm Johnson	Also co-writer and producer
2013	The Heat	Special Agent Levy	
2014	A Haunted House 2	Malcolm Johnson	Also co-writer and producer
2016	Fifty Shades of Black	Christian Black	Also co-writer and producer
2017	Naked	Rob Anderson	Also co-writer and producer
2019	Sextuplets	Alan Spellman Daniels/Russell Spellman/Dawn Spellman/Jasper Spellman/Ethan Spellman/Baby Pete Spellman/Lynette Spellman	Also co-writer and producer
2020	On the Rocks	Dean	
2021	Respect	Ted White	
2021	Back Home Again	Mr. Tortoise	Short film
2022	The Curse of Bridge Hollow	Howard Gordon	Also producer
2023	Air	George Raveling	
2025	Him	Isaiah White	
2026	Scary Movie	Shorty Meeks / Joe Jackson / Tiffany Wilson / Count Brolock	Also co-writer and co-producer

=== Television ===
Year	Title	Role	Notes
1992–1993	In Living Color	Himself	Cast member; 17 episodes (Season 3–4)
1995–1999	The Wayans Bros.	Marlon Williams	101 episodes; also co-creator and sketch writer
1996	The Parent 'Hood	Himself	Episode: "Ode to Billy Shankbreath"
1996	Mr. Show with Bob and David	KKK Member	Episode: "The Biggest Failure in Broadway History"
1996–1997	Waynehead	Blue	Voice; 6 episodes
1999	Hollywood Squares	Himself	Recurring panelist
1999	Happily Ever After: Fairy Tales for Every Child	Bad Bobby	Voice; episode: "The Bremen Town Musicians"
2000	Comedy Central Canned Ham	Himself	Episode: "Scary Movie"
2000	2000 MTV Video Music Awards	Himself	Main host
2001	Mad TV	Himself	Episode: "Episode #6.25"
2005	Mad TV	Himself	Episode: "Episode #11.1"
2006	The Boo Crew	Dirty	Voice; television specials
2006	Six Degrees	Homeless Guy	Episode: "The Puncher"
2011	Childrens Hospital	Dr. Black	Episode: "The Black Doctor"
2013	Sidewalks Entertainment	Himself	Host; episode: "Marlon Wayans"
2013	The Soup	Himself	Episode: Episode 10.2
2013	Anderson Live	Himself	Co-host; episode: "Episode #2.77"
2013	Second Generation Wayans	Himself	2 episodes; also executive producer
2013	Legit	Doctor	Episode: "Fatherhood"
2014	Funniest Wins	Himself	Host; 8 episodes
2014	Deal with It	Himself	Episode: "Marlon Wayans & Mo Mandel"
2015	Lip Sync Battle	Himself	Competitor; episode: "Queen Latifah vs. Marlon Wayans"
2015	I Can Do That	Himself	Main host
2015	America's Got Talent	Himself	Guest judge; episode: "Judge Cuts 3"
2016	Hollywood Game Night	Himself	Player; episode: "Way-ans to Go!"
2016	The Nightly Show with Larry Wilmore	Himself	Panelist; episode: "Rand Paul Talks Donald Trump's Candidacy"
2016	Givit Wednesday	Himself	Episode: "Puppies & Tattoos - Marlon Wayans/Alison Eastwood"
2016	Big Boy's Big Brawl	Himself	Episode: "Pilot"
2016	Animals.	Ry-Ry	Voice; episode: "Squirrels Part I"
2017	Safeword	Himself	Episode: "Kevin Hart vs. Damien Dante Wayans"
2017–2018	Marlon	Marlon Wayne	20 episodes; also co-creator and executive producer
2018	Do or Dare	Himself	Episode: "Marlon Wayans vs. Naomi"
2018	Drop the Mic	Himself	Episode: "Episode #2.3"
2018	The Hollywood Puppet Show	Himself	Episode: "Marlon Wayans and Bow Wow"
2019	Sherman's Showcase	Himself	Episode: "Enemies"
2022	To Tell the Truth	Himself	Episode: "Marlon Wayans, Arsenio Hall, and Joel McHale"
2022	Oh Hell No! with Marlon Wayans	Himself	Host; 6 episodes
2022–2024	Bel-Air	Lou	3 episodes
2023	The Daily Show	Himself	Recurring host; season 28
2025	Poppa's House	Melvin	

=== Comedy specials ===
Year	Title	Notes
2018	Marlon Wayans: Woke-ish	Netflix-stand-up comedy special
2021	Marlon Wayans: You Know What It Is	HBO Max-stand-up comedy special
2022	Marlon Wayans Presents: The Headliners	HBO Max-stand-up comedy special; with Tony Baker, Sydney Castillo, DC Ervin, Esau McGraw, and Chaunté Wayans
2023	Marlon Wayans: God Loves Me	HBO Max-stand-up comedy special
2024	Marlon Wayans: Good Grief	Amazon Prime-stand-up comedy special

=== Documentary ===
Year	Title
1991	The Best of Robert Townsend & His Partners in Crime
2003	Tupac: Resurrection
2005	Hubert Selby Jr.: It/ll Be Better Tomorrow
2009	Why We Laugh: Black Comedians on Black Comedy
2012	Venus and Serena

=== Music videos ===
Year	Song	Artist
1992	"The Best Things in Life Are Free"	Luther Vandross & Janet Jackson
2018	"Just My Type"	Tiana

== Awards and nominations ==
Award	Year (Note: Indicates the year of ceremony. Each year is linked to the article about the awards held that year, wherever possible.)	Category	Nominated work	Result	Ref.
BET Comedy Awards	2004	Outstanding Lead Actor in a Box Office Movie	White Chicks	Nominated	
BET Comedy Awards	2004	Outstanding Writing for a Box Office Movie (Note: Shared with the writers.)	White Chicks	Won	
Black Reel Awards	2001	Best Supporting Actor	Requiem for a Dream	Nominated	
Black Reel TV Awards	2024	Outstanding Guest Performance in a Drama Series	Bel-Air	Nominated	
Blockbuster Entertainment Awards	2001	Favorite Actor - Comedy	Scary Movie	Nominated	
Chlotrudis Awards	2001	Best Supporting Actor	Requiem for a Dream	Nominated	
Critics' Choice Awards	2024	Best Acting Ensemble (Note: Shared with the cast.)	Air	Nominated	
Fangoria Chainsaw Awards	2001	Best Supporting Actor	Requiem for a Dream	Nominated	
Golden Raspberry Awards	2005	Worst Actress (Note: Shared with Shawn Wayans.)	White Chicks	Nominated	
Golden Raspberry Awards	2005	Worst Screen Couple (Note: Shared with Shawn Wayans.)	White Chicks	Nominated	
Golden Raspberry Awards	2005	Worst Screenplay (Note: Shared with Keenen Ivory Wayans, Shawn Wayans, Andy McElfresh, Michael Anthony Snowden and Xavier Cook.)	White Chicks	Nominated	
Golden Raspberry Awards	2007	Worst Actor (Note: Shared with Shawn Wayans.)	Little Man	Won	
Golden Raspberry Awards	2007	Worst Screen Couple (Note: Shared with either Shawn Wayans or Kerry Washington.)	Little Man	Won	
Golden Raspberry Awards	2007	Worst Screenplay (Note: Shared with Keenen Ivory Wayans and Shawn Wayans.)	Little Man	Nominated	
Golden Raspberry Awards	2010	Worst Supporting Actor	G.I. Joe: The Rise of Cobra	Nominated	
MTV Movie & TV Awards	2007	Best Kiss (Note: Shared with Brittany Daniel.)	Little Man	Nominated	
NAACP Image Awards	2024	Outstanding Writing in a Television Movie or Special	Marlon Wayans: God Loves Me	Nominated	
NAACP Image Awards	2025	Outstanding Guest Performance	Bel-Air	Won	
Nickelodeon Kids' Choice Awards	1998	Favorite Television Actor	The Wayans Bros.	Nominated	
Online Film Critics Society Awards	2001	Best Ensemble	Requiem for a Dream	Nominated	
People's Choice Awards	2021	Comedy Act of 2021	Marlon Wayans: You Know What It Is	Nominated	
People's Choice Awards	2024	Comedy Act of the Year	Marlon Wayans: God Loves Me	Nominated	
San Diego Film Critics Society Awards	2023	Best Ensemble	Air	Nominated	
