= Darius Films =

American-Canadian film and television production company

- Type: Private
- Industry: Film; Television production
- Founded: 1996; 30 years ago
- Founder: Nicholas Tabarrok
- Headquarters: Los Angeles, California, United States; Toronto, Ontario, Canada
- Parent: Darius and I
- Website: www.dariusfilms.com

Darius Films Inc. is an American-Canadian film and television production company founded in 1996. Headquarters are located in Los Angeles, California, and Toronto, Ontario. The company makes about $1-5 million in sales.

It has produced over thirty feature films, which have premiered at the most prestigious film festivals and have sold worldwide. They have worked with actors and actresses, including Samantha Bee, Matt Dillon, Woody Harrelson, Ethan Hawke, Harvey Keitel, Nick Nolte, Sandra Oh, Noomi Rapace, Tim Roth, Kurt Russell, and Susan Sarandon.

Highlights of some of their productions include Stockholm, The Art of the Steal, The Padre, Weirdsville, Defendor, and The Calling.

== Filmography ==
=== Films ===
- Motel (1998)
- Jailbait (2000)
- Re-Generation (2004)
- The Life and Hard Times of Guy Terrifico (2005)
- Cool Money (2005)
- A Lobster Tale (2006)
- Run Robot Run! (2006)
- Weirdsville (2007)
- Hank and Mike (2008)
- Surviving Crooked Lake (2008)
- Jack and Jill vs. the World (2008)
- Cooper's Camera (2008)
- Down to the Dirt (2008)
- Defendor (2009)
- A Beginner's Guide to Endings (2010)
- Good Satan (2012)
- The Art of the Steal (2013)
- The Calling (2014)
- The Intruders (2015)
- Man Vs. (2015)
- The Padre (2018)
- Stockholm (2018)
- Benjamin (2018)
- The Baker (2022)
- Irena's Vow (2023)
- The Retirement Plan (2023)
- Signal One (2026)

=== Television ===
- Fugget About It (2012–2016)
