= Carlos Saldaña =

Mexican comic-book creator and comedian (born 1954)

- Born: Carlos Saldaña; 2/13/1954 Los Angeles, California
- Areas: Writer; Penciller; Inker
- Pseudonym: Carlos "Burrito" Saldaña
- Notable works: Burrito: Jack of All Trades; PreAmerica

Carlos Saldaña (born February 13, 1954) is a Mexican comic-book creator and comedian.

== Career ==
Carlos Saldaña's best known created works is that of Burrito: Jack-of-All-Trades published under his privately owned imprint, Accent Comics. He has also utilized the Adobe Flash Player application to create online animations which he proudly displays on his official website. Many of his animations (or "Burritoons") feature the work of his friends and fellow comic creators including El Muerto: The Aztec Zombie by Javier Hernandez, Sonambulo by Rafael Navarro, and El Gato Negro by Richard Dominguez. He has also made a flash presentation on the Battle of Chavez Ravine entitled, The Chavez Ravine Story, which is currently featured at his official website. Saldaña is also a member of several groups including the National Cartoonist Society and the Comic Art Professional Society (CAPS). He was a founding member of the Professional Amigos of Comic Art Society.

Carlos has made a career for himself as a stand-up comedian with some of his sets on his official site.

== P.A.C.A.S. ==
The Professional Amigos of Comic Art Society or P.A.C.A.S. was a non-profit organization founded by Saldaña and fellow comic book creators Richard Dominguez, Jose Martinez, and Fernando Rodriguez in 1995. The purpose of which was to unite various cartoonists, writers, colorists, letterers and publishers in the shared goal of using networking and dialogue between themselves in order to assist their various projects in the hopes of expanding the opportunities for social growth in the comic art community. The group disbanded a few years after its inception, with the only lasting tributes found online, an official website run by Carlos Saldaña and an official MySpace page maintained by members of Dominguez's own Azteca Productions staff. The latter of which promises to be updated with the "latest news regarding former PACAS members and any current projects they happen to be working on." Rumors persist of a possible revival, but there is currently no official confirmation.
