= El Muerto (2007 film) =

2007 film by Brian Cox

- Promotional poster for the premiere of El Muerto (The Dead One) in 2007.
- Directed by: Brian Cox
- Screenplay by: Brian Cox
- Based on: Comic Book: Javier Hernandez
- Produced by: Javier Hernandez; Marc Ambrose; Bruno Leone; Dan Leone; Richard Leone; Susan R. Rodgers; Larry Rattner; Wilmer Valderrama
- Starring: Wilmer Valderrama; Angie Cepeda; Joel David Moore; Tony Plana; Michael Parks; Billy Drago; María Conchita Alonso
- Cinematography: Steve Yedlin
- Edited by: Chris Wright
- Music by: Tony Humecke; Martin Espino
- Distributed by: Echo Bridge Home Entertainment (USA); Bleiberg Entertainment
- Release date: March 1, 2007
- Running time: 90 minutes
- Country: United States
- Language: English

El Muerto (alternatively, The Dead One, El Muerto: The Dead One, The Dead One: El Muerto, The Dead One: An American Legend) is a 2007 American independent superhero film based on the comic book series, El Muerto: The Aztec Zombie created by Javier Hernandez. The film was written and directed by Brian Cox with Javier Hernandez serving as Associate-Producer. It stars Wilmer Valderrama, Angie Cepeda, Joel David Moore, Billy Drago, Tony Plana, Michael Parks, María Conchita Alonso and Tony Amendola. The film follows the story of Diego de la Muerte, a 21-year-old Mexican-American who is abducted, sacrificed, and sent back to the land of the living by the Aztec gods of death and destiny to fulfill an ancient prophecy. The official premiere was held on March 1, 2007 at the Latino Film Festival in San Diego, California with a straight-to-DVD release slated for September 18, 2007 followed by subsequent screenings in New York City and San Diego. El Muerto has gone on to win the Best Feature Film Award at the first annual Whittier Film Festival in 2008.

== Plot ==
Centuries ago, the Aztec Empire of Mexico was conquered by the Spanish conquistadors. Horrified by their religious practices, the Spaniards set out to convert the native population to Catholicism, effectively declaring war upon the Aztec religion. According to an ancient prophecy, the Aztecs and their religion will return to dominance in a time known as the Sixth Sun.

While attempting to illegally cross the United States-Mexico border, young orphan boy Juan Diego is singled out by a fellow traveler, a strange old man known only as "Old Indian" claiming to know the way. The old man leads the boy to an old Aztec shrine dedicated to the god of death, Mictlantecuhtli. Explaining that they must give thanks to Tezcatlipoca, the god of sacrifice, Old Indian proceeds to carve a symbol of the god in to Diego's hand. Declaring the boy's blood to be pure, the Old Indian dies in the throes of invocations of Nahuatl, abandoning the boy in the desert.

Ten years later, 21-year-old Diego has made a home for himself in East Los Angeles. He shares an apartment with his best friend Zak and is in love with Maria, niece of Padre Somera of the local mission which dates back to the Cortés era. However, Diego and Maria's relationship is strained both by his haunting encounter with Old Indian and the devout Padre's disapproval of the young man's sympathy towards Aztec beliefs and mythology. Anticipating a local Dia de los Muertos festival, Diego begins to feel the call of something powerful. He dresses as an undead Mariachi, clad in black with the traditional markings to give himself a skeletal appearance.

En route to the celebration, the forces of the Aztec underworld cause Diego's car to crash, ending his life. Diego awakens in the Aztec afterlife of Mictlan where the god of death sacrifices him to Tezcatlipoca in a ritual where his heart is torn from his chest with the aid of an obsidian blade. He is then sent back to the land of the living exactly one year after his death. Diego, selected long ago by the Old Indian, is the sacrificial priest in service to Tezcatlipoca. In order to fulfill the prophecy of the Sixth Sun, Tezcatlipoca requires three human sacrifices, each symbolizing the Catholic Church that wiped out the old gods over five hundred years ago. And Maria, being the direct descendant of the Somera family is at risk. Armed with the power to take life or restore it, Diego must struggle against the very gods who created him in order to save the woman he loves.

== Cast ==
- Darien Dikeos as Young Juan Diego: While trying to cross the border into the states, a young Juan Diego is singled out by an old Indian man who speaks the Aztec language. The Indian man leads him to a small shrine, performs an ancient ritual, and declares the boy's blood is pure. Soon after, the man goes into convulsions and dies in the violent throes of strange mutterings and invocations.
- Billy Drago as The Old Indian / Catrina (Indio Viejo): A strange old Native American man who marks Diego with an Aztec symbol representing Tezcatlipoca and soon after dies.
- Wilmer Valderrama as Juan Diego (Diego de la Muerte / El Muerto): Ten years later, a 21-year-old Diego has made a home for himself in the Latino community of East Los Angeles. Diego has fallen in love with Maria, a young lady who is the niece of the padre of the local mission, and whose family goes back to the very first Christian missionaries to settle the southwest. However, Diego's past still haunts him and secretly dreads the thought of his destiny.
- Joel David Moore as Zak (Zak Silver): Longtime friend to Diego, who is crushed to hear of his friend's demise, but shocked to find his friend still lives as the walking-dead. Zak is the more skeptical character in the movie, often preferring logic to faith.
- Angie Cepeda as Maria Somera (Maria Hermosa): Love interest to Diego and best friend. She is descended from the first Christian missionaries from Spain to settle in the southwest, dating back to the Cortés era.
- Tony Amendola as Padre Somera: Father of the local mission and the uncle of Maria. The Padre, a very dogmatic Catholic, would often get into theological debates with Diego who was fascinated by Aztec culture and mythology. Padre Somera's disapproval of Diego placed strain on the couple's relationship.
- Tony Plana as The Caretaker (Aparicio): An older Chicano man and caretaker of the local cemetery. He befriends Diego after witnessing his powers and acts as his mentor. The character of Aparicio was the invention of director Brian Cox, which was inspired by a minor character in the original comic book. Hernandez has gone on record saying that Aparicio was his favorite character in the film.
- María Conchita Alonso as The Nun (Sister Rosa): A nun of the local mission with an abused past.
- Michael Parks as The Sheriff (Sheriff Ezra Stone): A police sheriff investigating recent murders within the Somera mission and strange occurrences surrounding Maria.
- The Aztec gods Mictlantecuhtli and Tezcatlipoca were both created through special effects. Mictlantecuhtli was made up of puppetry and other visual effects, being depicted as a giant skeletal figure and speaking entirely in Nahuatl. Tezcatlipoca's depiction was completely computer-generated with his voice supplied by Alfonso Arau (credited as "Voices"). The film also referenced Tezcatlipoca's many epithets, such as Night Drinker.

Javier Hernandez made a cameo appearance in the film in which he has a short conversation with El Muerto, credited as "Man in Costume", while co-producer Susan R. Rodgers appears in an uncredited cameo as a participant in the Dia de los Muertos festival. Rafael Navarro, longtime friend of Hernandez and fellow comic book creator had a brief cameo as a witness of a car wreck inadvertently caused by El Muerto.

== Film production ==
=== Development ===
"The idea that El Muerto or Diego is struggling with is god cruel or is god benevolent?...if god tells you to do things, you can get away with just about anything. And that's really what I wanted to deal with in the context of today...does god tell you to go and kill in his own name?...yes, [the film] is about the Aztec tradition and the Catholic tradition, but is also an allegory for what's taking place now."

— Brian Cox, from the DVD commentary.

One year during San Diego Comic-Con, Hernandez was interviewed by NPR regarding his comic. A few weeks after, the segment finally aired and caught the attention of director Brian Cox. The director contacted Hernandez and scheduled a meeting in which they talked of the character in depth. At the end of the conversation, Cox asked if he would ever consider El Muerto as a film. A question to which Hernandez responded, "Well, I wouldn't NOT consider it!" Shortly after their meeting, Brian contacted Larry Rattner, a close friend and producer. Coincidentally, Rattner had just met a family that had just come out of a successful publishing venture and were interested in financing a film. Rattner soon convinced them of the potential of an El Muerto film.

A script for the film was written by Brian Cox with Hernandez serving as Associate-Producer. Hernandez was excited to have Valderrama play the lead, stating in an interview, "Wilmer is just drop-dead perfect! Really, it was a lucky break for us getting him to play Diego de la Muerte/El Muerto. He is so completely immersed in the role. For him, it's a chance to play a leading role in a film. And he sees the franchise potential with this character. I mean, he's playing a comic book superhero, how cool is that!?" In the same interview he also praised the supporting cast, saying "The quality of actors should give you an idea about the quality of the script."

The film rights to El Muerto were later purchased by Peninsula Films in May 2003. Valderrama described the film as "The Crow meets Desperado meets Spawn. It's an odd choice for me, but I love making those." He later added, "It's presented in such an odd, hardcore, rad way...very Robert Rodriguez. It's very, very hard. It's a beautiful story told through the eyes of this young guy who's sacrificed in the name of the Aztec gods and he comes back to be a weapon for them. And [instead] he rebels against them and asks all these questions about religion."

=== Filming ===
Filming officially ended on February 14, 2005. On September 20, 2006, Hernandez announced that the final cut would be privately screened, stating that the film was "officially done":

[T]he last time I saw the film was November '05, once on Dia de Los Muertos and again two weeks later with Wilmer...that was a real rough cut. No digital effects, no official music/score, rough sound/color, etc.

=== Design and special effects ===
Tezcatlipoca was entirely computer-generated and voiced by Alfonso Arau.

Valderrama wore different types of make-up including full theatrical make-up, full prosthetic make-up, and was required to wear black contact lenses. Mark Bautista, key make-up for the film, explained the varying types of make-up used and their different levels: "Within the makeup itself, Diego proceeds to go to a party. The party make up is more or less like a theatrical make up - subtle, something you do at home. Once [his] accident occurs this makeup is now cauterized into his face, I wanted to make that makeup almost look scarified." Much of the costume and dress design followed a strict color palette reflecting the Dia de los Muertos. For Angie Cepeda's character, her colors in rust, gold, marigold, orange colors representative of the marigold from the Dia de los Muertos tradition. Valderrama's costume design was a direct-adaptation from the comic book series with very few changes. Special effects were used to create both the Aztec gods. While Mictlantecuhtli required visual effects and puppetry by Nathan Mussel, Tezcatlipoca was entirely computer generated and throughout the film he is shown to manifest himself on dark mirrored surfaces. Tezcatlipoca was more prominent to the film's overall plot, and therefore made more appearances in the film than Mictlantecuhtli.

=== Soundtrack ===
The music and film score were composed by Tony Humecke with Bill Ewart serving as music supervisor. The soundtrack kept to the film's Aztec roots by featuring pre-Hispanic music as performed by Martin Espino. Espino also played a vital role due to his ability to speak the Aztec language of Nahuatl, which can be heard in various chants throughout the film. The soundtrack also featured such tracks as "Tierra" by Los Nativos, "El Troquero" by Valerio Longoria, "Tolkchoke" by En La Orilla De La Utopia, and "Nuestra Tierra" by Olmeca. All rhythm loops and designs were created by Beta Rhythm Farm.

=== Premiere and subsequent film screenings ===
The first private film-screenings were held in Los Angeles, New York, and the American film market respectively. During this time a trailer for the film, initially intended as a preview for the American film market, was released to the public on various shared-video sites such as YouTube. The film made its official premiere to the public on March 1, 2007 at the Latino Film Festival in San Diego, California. Stars Angie Cepeda and Tony Plana were present at the event as well as creator Javier Hernandez. Subsequent festival screenings included Toronto, San Francisco, San Diego, Los Angeles and New York. The latter of which offered a chance to win free tickets.

The film received a full-fledged theatrical premiere at Laemmle Grande Theatre on September 14, 2007 located at its downtown Los Angeles venue. A DVD release was slated for September 18, with Bloodydisgusting.com later having a contest to win a free copy. Another screening was held at the first annual Whittier Film Festival on March 7 of 2008 where it won the Best Feature Film award. Javier Hernandez also hosted a special podcast on his radio show, Planet Comic Book Radio, where listeners were given the chance to win free tickets to the event.

== Home media ==
The DVD was released by Echo Bridge Entertainment on September 18, 2007. Despite being titled El Muerto throughout its conception and subsequent film screenings, the original DVD release was later re-titled The Dead One, a loose translation of El Muerto, for marketing purposes. It was later reissued under the film's original title.

Special features include:

- Seven original illustrations by special guest artists Michael Aushenker, Jason Martin, Rhode Montijo, Rafael Navarro, Ted Seko, Bernyce Talley, and Mort Todd
- Commentary with Director Brian Cox and Javier Hernandez
- Drawing the Dead art tutorial by Javier Hernandez
- Slide-show of the original comic book
- Day of the Dead featurette
- The Making of The Dead One
- Fun on the Set of The Dead One
- A Spanish track
- Two DVD-ROM special features

Also included within the DVD case is an exclusive collectible mini-comic created for the DVD and two wash-and-wear tattoos.

=== Mark of Mictlantecuhtli ===
Mark of Mictlantecuhtli is an exclusive 8-page mini-comic created for the original DVD release by Javier Hernandez and Mort Todd. The short story focuses on the significance of Diego's calavera tattoo, actually an Aztec symbol of death representing Mictlantecuhtli. Mark Bautista, the make-up artist for the film, also makes a cameo appearance in the mini-comic as the tattoo shop owner, Marc.

== Reception ==
The premiere and subsequent film screenings created a positive response, with tickets to the film's premiere actually selling out. After the film's initial DVD release, the online community had some generally mixed reviews. The film has a "B+" rating Yahoo! Movies. JoeHorror.com praised El Muerto, calling it "a very well acted supernatural thriller, heavily steeped in Latino mysticism and gorgeously decorated with Dia de los Muertos symbolism" and summed up the movie as a "Beautiful Dia de los Muertos inspired nightmare!" One review bemoaned the lack of big budget special effects but praised Billy Drago's performance as the villain. While another reviewer from Film Critics United.com admired the effort placed in the film's production but thought the overall product "fell flat".

On the more negative side, a review from JoBlo.com called the movie "nonsensical, ridiculous and boring in every way you don’t want your comic book adaptation to be" and gave the DVD a 1.5 out of a possible 4 rating. KillerReviews.com defended the film against some of the more harsh reviews, calling it "Bland But Not Altogether Bad."

=== Comparison to "The Crow" ===
Due to early online film announcements, those who were unfamiliar with the premise of the film or its basis criticized that the main character's guise too closely resembled that of The Crow from the film of the same name based on the Gothic comic-book series created by James O'Barr. The similarity was noted in an interview with Javier Hernandez:

Yeah, they’re both dead. A lot of dead guys in comics. The Spectre. The Spirit. Anyway, visually it's got the white face and the black suit. But if you look at the Day of the Dead folklore, people paint the skull-face on them[selves], and then the black Mariachi was just a stylish element.

And further explored in another interview at JoBlo.com:

Well, I've heard initial Crow comparisons online, and I can understand that based on a visual basis. But our story, drawing from Mexican folklore and Aztec mythology, is about a guy getting abducted by the gods of death and destiny, and fighting against their will. And his look is inspired directly from the Dia de los Muertos celebrations.

Several reviewers acknowledged a resemblance, but most agreed it was a visual basis. JoeHorror.com declared, "The Dead One does bear a significant resemblance to the aforementioned Crow, but it definitely has its own flavor and its own tale to tell, honoring its predecessor rather than trying to rip it off."

== See also ==
- El Muerto
- Javier Hernandez
- List of films based on comics
