= The Baker (2022 film) =

American vigilante action film directed by Jonathan Sobol

- US theatrical release poster
- Directed by: Jonathan Sobol
- Written by: Paolo Mancini; Thomas Michael
- Produced by: Doug Murray; William G. Santor; Nicholas Tabarrok
- Starring: Ron Perlman; Elias Koteas; Joel David Moore; Emma Ho; Harvey Keitel
- Cinematography: Adam Swica
- Edited by: Maureen Grant; Christopher John Malanchen
- Production companies: Darius Films; Productivity Media
- Distributed by: Falling Forward Films; Productivity Media
- Release dates: October 31, 2022 (Austin); July 28, 2023 (United States)
- Running time: 104 minutes
- Countries: United States; Canada
- Language: English

The Baker is a 2022 vigilante action film directed by Jonathan Sobol. It stars Ron Perlman, Emma Ho, Elias Koteas, Harvey Keitel, and Joel David Moore. After a premiere at the 2022 Austin Film Festival, it was commercially released in the United States on July 28, 2023.

== Plot ==
Pappi Sabinski, an elderly baker and former government assassin, must fight against gangsters to protect his granddaughter, Delfi, after she petulantly takes a satchel of drugs from his son, Peter, causing the murder of Peter when he unwittingly delivers the empty satchel.

== Cast ==
- Ron Perlman as Pappi Sabinski, a U.S. military veteran with PTSD
- Elias Koteas as Vic, Merchant's chief henchman and enforcer
- Joel David Moore as Peter, Pappi's estranged son
- Samantha Kaine as Det. Weintrager
- Paolo Mancini as Luca Rispoli
- Adam Moryto as Bannon
- Dax Ravina as Milky, criminal associate of Peter's
- Caroline Raynaud as Marguerite
- Varun Saranga as Mani
- Emma Ho as Delfi, Peter's mute (until the final four words of dialogue) daughter
- Harvey Keitel as Merchant, drug kingpin seeking stolen shipment of heroin

== Production ==
The film was shot on location in the Cayman Islands in 2021.

== Reception ==
On the review aggregator website Rotten Tomatoes, 57% of 14 critics' reviews are positive, with an average rating of 5.4/10.
