= Signal One (2026 film) =

- Release poster
- Directed by: Jonathan Sobol
- Written by: Jonathan Sobol
- Produced by: Doug Murray; William G. Santor; Nicholas Tabarrok
- Starring: Isabelle Fuhrman; Dennis Quaid; David Thewlis; Josh Hutcherson; Raoul Bhaneja; Stephen Adekolu
- Cinematography: Adam Swica
- Edited by: Duff Smith; Nick Wong; Matt Lyon
- Music by: Ryan Taubert
- Production companies: Darius Films; Productivity Media
- Distributed by: Radial Entertainment; Shout! Studios
- Release dates: June 5, 2026 (theatrical and VOD)
- Running time: 87 minutes
- Countries: Canada; United States
- Language: English

Signal One is a 2026 science fiction film written and directed by Jonathan Sobol. It stars Isabelle Fuhrman, Dennis Quaid, David Thewlis, Josh Hutcherson, Kiera Allen, and Raoul Bhaneja.

== Plot ==
Dr. Annika Kask, a computer scientist known for groundbreaking work in dark matter astrophysics, and Charlie Kaminsky, a scientist who invented technology that gives sight to the blind, are recruited by billionaire Sam Houston, CEO of a solar energy company, to join a secret research project on a private Caribbean island. The project centers on a device called LITTLEMOUTH, created by eccentric physicist Perry Glassner, which is designed to communicate with extraterrestrial intelligence.

Annika is hesitant, worried about the potential risks of communicating with aliens, while Charlie is less concerned. As the team begins receiving and transmitting signals beyond Earth, they realize they have achieved humanity's first contact with an alien intelligence. What starts as a scientific breakthrough quickly becomes a crisis as the incoming communication has profound effects on the researchers, the facility, and the entire planet.

The earth loses electrical power for eight minutes, killing a large number of people, until Perry turns off the transmitter. An anomaly appears in the sky over the transmitter and begins growing exponentially. Agents from the National Security Agency visit Sam at his New York headquarters to question him about it. Panic, chaos, and a state of emergency ensue around the world.

Sam flies to his island, where he and the team debate whether the intelligence is hostile, friendly, or beyond human understanding. As they prepare to enter the area beneath the anomaly, a US military force arrives and detains them. Annika persuades the NSA to let her near the transmitter, whereupon she runs to it and is shot by a soldier.

As she lies bleeding, the alien intelligence communicates with her telepathically, telling her that they are neither biological nor machines but an entity whose purpose is to learn, transform, and protect. Because humans have revealed themselves, they intend to shield humanity from the universe, which contains civilizations that would destroy Earth. Annika is healed as the planet is rendered invisible from space, and she explains to the authorities what she was told.

== Cast ==
- Isabelle Fuhrman as Annika Kask
- Dennis Quaid as Sam Houston
- David Thewlis as Perry Glassner
- Josh Hutcherson as Charlie Kaminsky
- Raoul Bhaneja as Agent Sparrow
- Stephen Adekolu as Solomon

== Production ==
In June 2022, it was revealed that Jonathan Sobol had written and directed a science fiction film titled Littlemouth. By March 2026, the film had been retitled to Signal One, and that Radial Entertainment and Shout! Studios had acquired the distribution rights. Isabelle Fuhrman, Dennis Quaid, David Thewlis, Josh Hutcherson, Kiera Allen, and Raoul Bhaneja rounded out the cast.

== Release ==
Signal One was released on video on demand on June 5, 2026.

== See also ==
- Dark forest hypothesis
