= Tabarrok =

Tabarrok is a surname. Notable people with the surname include:

- Alex Tabarrok, Canadian-American economist
- Nicholas Tabarrok, Canada-based film producer
