= Nicholas Tabarrok =

Film producer

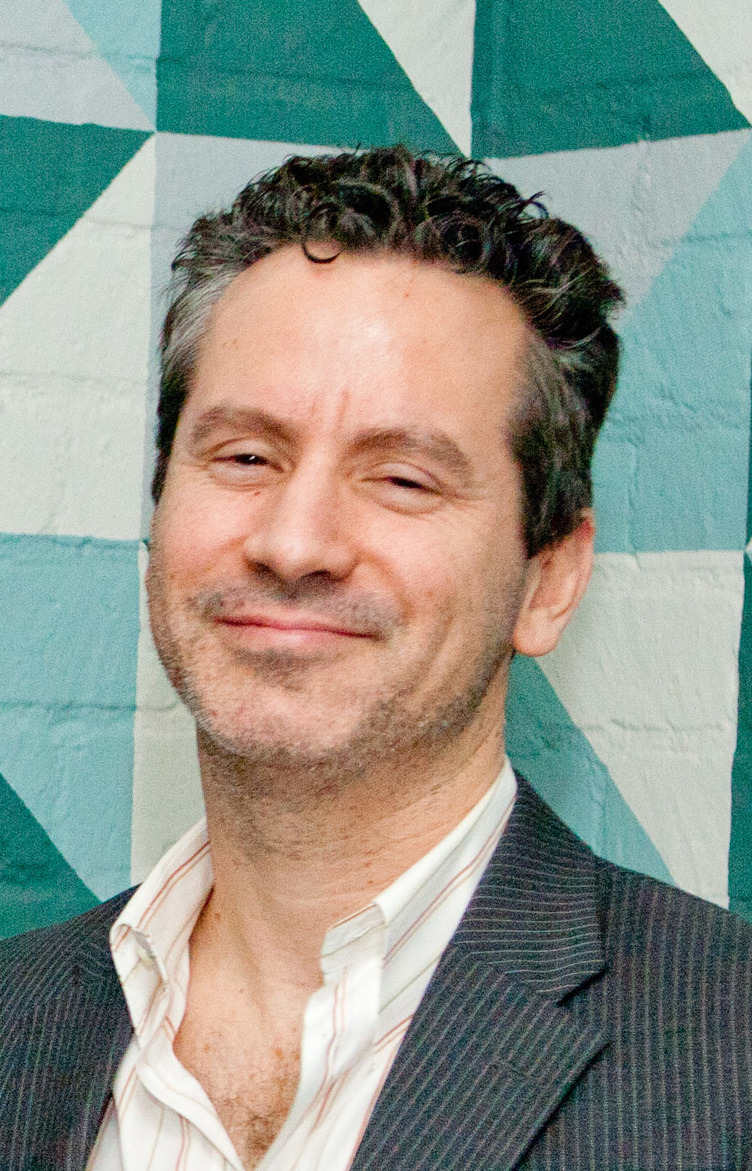
- Occupation: film producer

Nicholas Tabarrok is a film producer who started his producing career with smaller unusual films, made in his native Canada. Later, larger-budget films were made in America, or funded by Americans.

The Hollywood Reporter noted that Tabarrok was skilled at finding funding from government sources, citing his 2018 film Stockholm, as an example. Stockholm received funding help from Sweden due to casting Noomi Rapace, and other Swedish actors, and received funding help from Canada, where it was filmed. It reported that American actor Ethan Hawke was the only actor to film any scenes in Sweden—all establishing exterior shots.

== Filmography ==
Films and television shows which Tabarrok produced or helped produce.
title	year	notes
Garage	1997	
Caprice	1997	a short
Stand by Your Booth	1998	a short
Motel	1998	
Tribulation	2000	
Lakeboat	2000	
Jailbait	2000	a made for tv movie
Quints	2000	a made for tv movie
Left Behind: The Movie	2000	
Judgment	2001	
Blackout	2001	a made-for-TV movie
Deceived	2002	a music video
Left Behind II: Tribulation Force	2002	
Masterpiece Monday	2003	a short film
Re-Generation	2004	
The Life and Hard Times of Guy Terrifico	2005	
Cool Money	2005	a made for TV movie
Left Behind III: World at War	2005	
Run Robot Run!	2006	
A Lobster Tale	2006	
Weirdsville	2007	
Surviving Crooked Lake	2008	
Hank and Mike	2008	
Jack and Jill vs. the World	2008	
Coopers' Camera	2008	
Down to the Dirt	2008	
Love & Justice	2008	a short film
Chicken Card	2008	a short film
Defendor	2009	
Too Late to Say Goodbye	2009	a made for TV movie
A Dark Radius	2009	a made for TV movie
Everything She Ever Wanted	2009	a television miniseries
A Beginner's Guide to Endings	2010	
Happenchance	2010	a short film
Running Mates	2011	
Stand by Your Booth	2012	a made for TV movie
Good Satan	2012	
Cold Blooded	2012	
Fugget About It	2012-2013	a television series
The Art of the Steal	2013	
The Calling	2014	
The Intruders	2015	
Man Vs.	2015	
Numb	2015	
Look Again	2015	
Stockholm	2018	
The Padre	2018	
The Women of Alpine Road	2019	a short film
Benjamin	2019	directed by Bob Saget
The Retirement Plan	2023	
Irena's Vow	2023	
Signal One	2026	
