= Valeria Henríquez =

Colombian actress

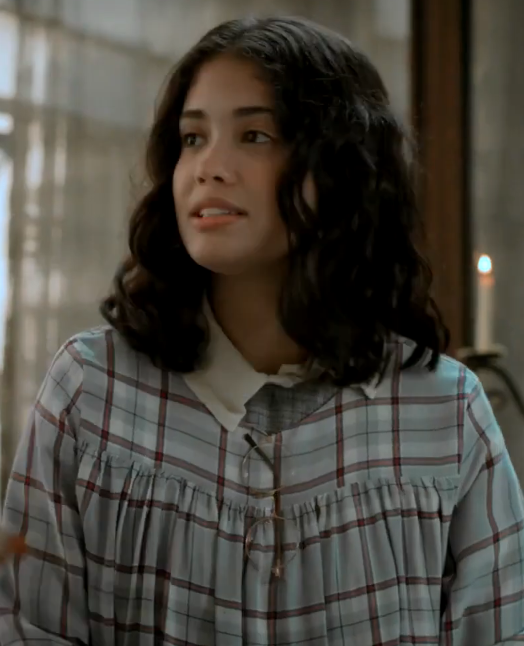
- Born: February 4, 1994 (age 32); Bogotá, Colombia
- Occupation: Actress

Valeria Henríquez (born February 4, 1994) is a Colombian actress. She received a Canadian Screen Award nomination for Best Actress at the 7th Canadian Screen Awards in 2019 for her performance in the film The Padre.

She had a leading role in the Colombian television series La Cacica in 2017.

Also, she had a second character role in the highly successful 2022 Colombian Netflix series The Marked Heart (original title Pálpito).
