= Fugget About It =

Animated sitcom

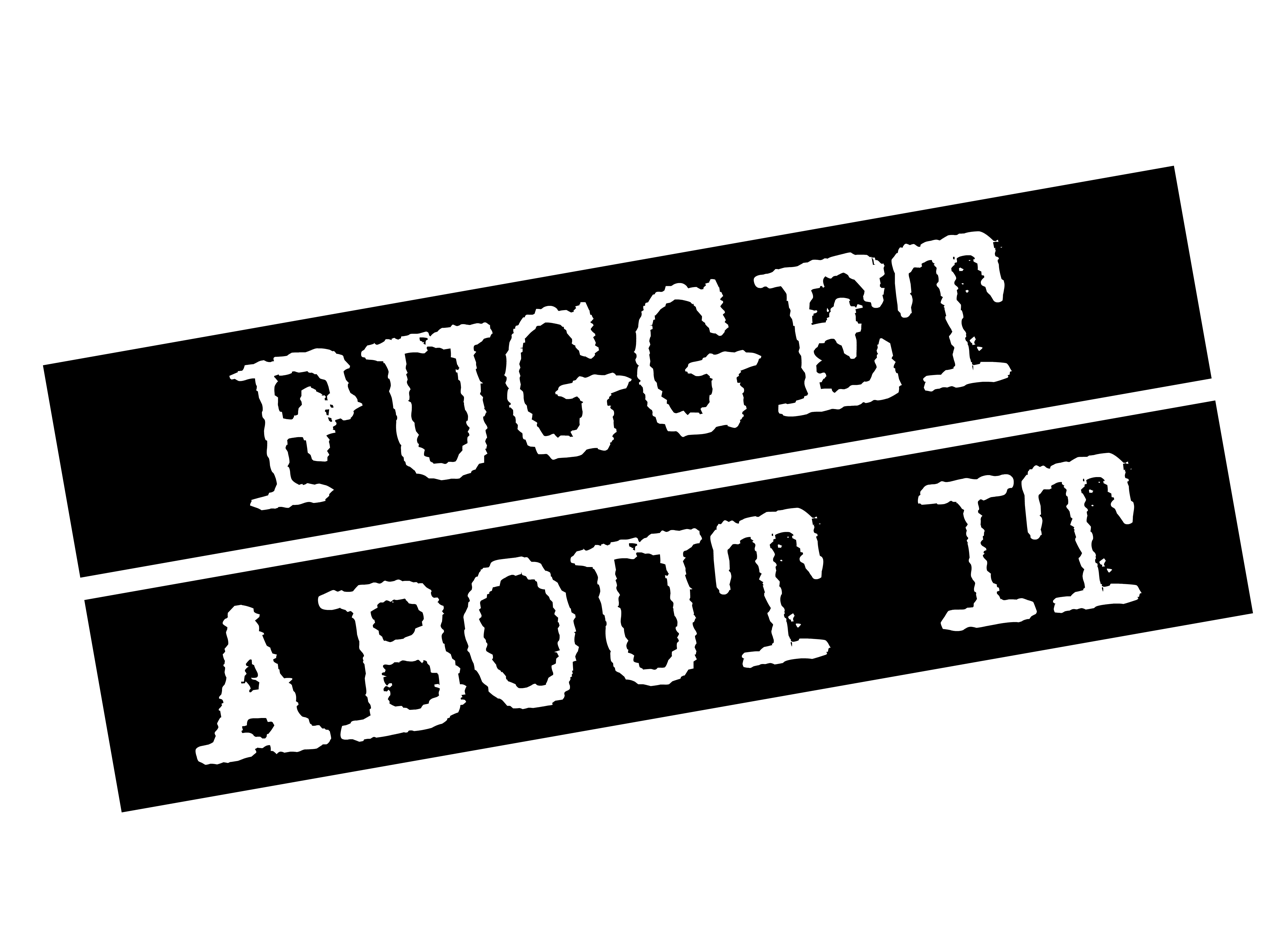
- Genre: Animated sitcom Satire; Adult animation
- Created by: Nicholas Tabarrok; Willem Wennekers
- Developed by: Jeff Abugov
- Written by: Willem Wennekers (shorts)
- Directed by: Richard Weston
- Voices of: Tony Nappo; Jacqueline Pillon; Chuck Shamata; Emilie-Claire Barlow; Danny Smith; Linda Kash; Ted Atherton
- Theme music composer: Angelo Oddi
- Opening theme: "Fugget About It!"
- Composer: Angelo Oddi
- Countries of origin: Canada; United States
- Original languages: English; French
- No. of seasons: 3
- No. of episodes: 46 (+20 shorts)

Production
- Executive producers: Nicholas Tabarrok; Willem Wennekers; Jeff Abugov (season 1); Vince Commisso; Steve Jarosz
- Producer: Marissa Collyer (seasons 1–2)
- Running time: 21–22 minutes (series); 3 minutes (shorts)
- Production companies: Darius Films; 9 Story Media Group

Original release
- Network: Teletoon at Night (seasons 1–2); Adult Swim (season 3); Hulu (U.S.)
- Release: September 7, 2012 – March 25, 2016
- Network: YouTube
- Release: October 25, 2024 – April 30, 2025

Fugget About It (French: Faut pas rêver!) is a Canadian adult animated sitcom created by Nicholas Tabarrok and Willem Wennekers for Teletoon's late night block, Teletoon at Night. The show is rated 14+ and 14A for sexuality, violence, and profanity, which makes it the first adult animated series by 9 Story Media Group. The show was created from the Pilot Project contest on Teletoon. The series originally aired from September 7, 2012 to March 25, 2016. In the US, the series made its premiere first on Hulu on October 13, 2013.

The sitcom follows the misadventures of Jimmy Falcone, a former mafia caporegime from New York City who is forced to seek refuge alongside his family to a Canadian town following a series of subsequent mafia related incidents upon murdering his own mob boss. While residing there, he and his family deal with everyday problems related to Canadian life, with Jimmy's mafia-like tendencies to resolve situations threatening the legitimacy of their witness protection.

On June 9, 2014, it was announced that a third season of the show had been ordered. It was revealed at Fan Expo Canada 2015 that the third season would air in October on Adult Swim. They also ran a promotional contest to name Special Agent Strait McCool's horse previously only known as Horse.

On January 19, 2016, the series was cancelled after three seasons. 46 episodes were produced. On September 27, 2024, it was announced on the show's YouTube channel that new content would be premiering on the channel in the future, with series co-creator Tabarrok revealing that the new content would be 20 3-minute shorts.

== Plot ==
The series follows a New York City mafia caporegime Jimmy Falcone, who moves to Regina, Saskatchewan to join a witness protection program after he kills his mob boss, Don Gambini. While pleading for his uncle Francesco "Cheech" Falcone's life, Don Gambini told Jimmy that he was required to kill his uncle. Then he made a sexual innuendo about Jimmy's oldest daughter Theresa, so an angry Jimmy impulsively threw Don Gambini out the 19th-floor window to his death. The rest of the Gambini mob then retaliated by trying to kill Jimmy, not caring if any of his family got killed. With no other options, Jimmy cut a deal with the FBI to protect his family, and they agreed to place the Falcones in witness protection if Jimmy testified against his fellow mobsters. This results in Jimmy and his family moving to Regina and living a new life under the name McDougal.

== Cast ==
Characters from left to right: Gina, Petey, Cookie, Jimmy, Cheech, Theresa, Strait McCool.

- James Danger Turncoat "Jimmy" Falcone (aka McDougal) (voiced by Tony Nappo) – The show's main protagonist, Cookie's husband, Cheech's nephew, and Theresa, Petey, and Gina's father. After his uncle, Cheech, had been caught repeatedly exposing mafia secrets (Jimmy Hoffa's burial site, the Kennedys, Scientology, etc.) to the public in bars and clubs, Jimmy was forced to plead with his boss Don Gambini for Cheech's life. However, his request was rejected and Gambini made a crude remark towards Jimmy's daughter Teresa. In retaliation, Jimmy kills Gambini by throwing him out of a high-rise window. Not too long after Gambini's death, the Gambini mob tries to kill Jimmy in retaliation, not caring if they killed his family in the process. In order to avoid retribution, he ratted out his former mob fellows to the FBI and has his family relocated to Regina, Saskatchewan via witness protection as a result. He consistently calls the city "Vagina" (among many other malapropisms) despite being set up with a job at the Regina Tourism Office by the witness protection program. He conforms to a stoic, masculine gangster archetype, though occasionally exposes more sensitive sides. He cares deeply about his family, regardless of their shortcomings and failures, including Cheech, whose antics have caused, and continue to cause, him trouble. His struggles to successfully meld his gangland instincts with the Canadian way of life drive many of the series' plots.
- Cookie Falcone (aka McDougal) (voiced by Jacqueline Pillon) – Jimmy's wife, Cheech's niece-in-law, and Theresa, Petey, and Gina's mother. She describes herself as a typical Brooklyn girl, which, to her, implies loyalty but with a degree of materialism and the expectation that her husband will take care of her—whenever he falls short, she quickly becomes disgruntled. She met Jimmy while she was stripping at a club. She loves her children but expresses vacillating degrees of resentment towards Cheech, as the cause of her family's move to Canada. She is frequently portrayed as the voice of reason. She has a brother named Paulie, who is similar to Petey, but she feels unable to talk about him around the family, due to his past betrayal of Jimmy.
- Francesco "Cheech" Falcone (aka McDougal) (voiced by Chuck Shamata) – Jimmy's uncle, Cookie's uncle-in-law, and Theresa, Petey, and Gina's great-uncle. Cheech's inability to keep mob secrets to himself is the primary reason the Falcone family is in witness protection. He is an alcoholic and his hare-brained antics often drive episode plots. Despite his idiocy, Jimmy cares deeply about him and often attempts to keep him in line. The rest of the family is somewhat more ambivalent towards Cheech, treating him with wildly varying degrees of coldness. Gina, in particular, seems to dislike, or even loathe, Cheech.
- Theresa Maria Falcone (aka McDougal) (voiced by Emilie-Claire Barlow) – Cookie & Jimmy's eldest daughter, Cheech's great-niece, and Petey and Gina's sister. She is 17 and matches up with the ditzy, airheaded, promiscuous archetype, often using her beauty to attract and exploit boys. She is superficial and materialistic, yet shows a slightly more sensitive side as the show progresses.
- Peter Frampton "Petey" Falcone (aka McDougal) (voiced by Danny Smith) – Cookie and Jimmy's middle child and only son, Cheech's great-nephew, and Theresa and Gina's brother. He is 16, a straight-A student, and a self-professed activist involved with a range of issues (most typically environmentalism and pacifism). At school, he's unpopular and deemed a "loser" by many of the other kids. His personality and intellectual interests strongly contrast with those of his family. At one point, while attempting to understand the discrepancy, he comes to believe himself to be adopted—after which it's revealed that he simply takes after a different side of the family, specifically his uncle Paulie. He is the only member of the family who is happy about the relocation to Canada, having seemingly hated the "old life".
- Gina Madonna Falcone (aka McDougal) (voiced by Linda Kash) – Cookie and Jimmy's youngest child, Cheech's great-niece, and Theresa and Petey's sister. She is 7 and takes after her father and uncle in possessing the mentality of a mobster, which is frequently shown to become sociopathic. She sometimes expresses a desire to kill Cheech for creating the circumstances that forced their move to Canada. She has a crush on Don Gambini's son, Carmine, who is similar to her and reciprocates her feelings.
- Special Agent Strait McCool (voiced by Ted Atherton) – A well-meaning, friendly, and conscientiously law-abiding Royal Canadian Mounted Police agent assigned to oversee the McDougal family. As an officer of the law, he is extremely – unrealistically – competent, described by his senior in one episode as having "cleaned up the entire west side of the country" after working vice, homicide, and narcotics. He is an ever-present thorn in Jimmy's side whenever the latter attempts to pull off a scheme. McCool reveals that his father abandoned him and his only known relative is his mother. He is revealed to be a former gambling addict, attend swinger parties and it was revealed by Cookie that he starred in a porno movie. His catchphrase is "For Canada, where..." or "For Canada, and...", ending with an apparently humorous aphorism or pithy summation somehow related to the current conversation, the episode's plot, or Canadian culture more broadly. McCool is likely a direct parody of Rocky and Bullwinkle's dimwitted but well-meaning Canadian Mountie, Dudley Do-Right.
- Sally Manero – formerly known as Salvatore "Sal" Falcone, Sally is Jimmy's estranged transgender mother and Cheech's sister. Originally only appearing in flashbacks, Sally first makes a physical appearance in "The Broadfather", where she explains that the reason for her disappearance was because the mob would kill her if they knew she was trans, leading to her abandoning Jimmy at the age of 13 and Jimmy assuming his father had been killed by a rival gang. Initially, Jimmy refuses to reconcile with his mother, not because she was trans, but because she abandoned him when he was still young. However, Jimmy eventually does so after Sally explains to him that it hurt her to leave her own child, but had she stayed, Jimmy would have never been made capo.

== Episodes ==
=== Season 1 (2012) ===
Fugget About It season 1 episodes
No. overall	No. in season	Title	Written by	Original release date
1	1	"Hate Crime Legislation Is for Pussies"	Jeff Abugov & Willem Wennekers	September 7, 2012
2	2	"The Full Mountie"	Jeff Abugov	September 14, 2012
3	3	"Screw You, Mr. Wonderful"	Pat Bullard	September 21, 2012
4	4	"The Man with No Ass"	Rebecca Addelman	September 28, 2012
5	5	"Cousin Sammy Dies in the End"	Jay Shore	October 5, 2012
6	6	"Rainbows and Painted Hos"	Jeff Abugov, Rebecca Addelman, Pat Bullard, Charles Horn, & Willem Wennekers	October 12, 2012
7	7	"Chokin' and Tokin' in the Queen City"	Pat Bullard	October 19, 2012
8	8	"Al Capone Wears Ladies Underwear"	Willem Wennekers	October 26, 2012
9	9	"Petey Gets God'd"	Rebecca Addelman	November 2, 2012
10	10	"The Oracle of Vagina"	Charles Horn	November 9, 2012
11	11	"The Horny Bastard"	Jeff Abugov	November 16, 2012
12	12	"Sex on Ice"	Charles Horn	November 23, 2012
13	13	"Hunts With Handgun"	Willem Wennekers	November 30, 2012

=== Season 2 (2013) ===
Fugget About It season 2 episodes
No. overall	No. in season	Title	Written by	Original release date
14	1	"The McFrugals"	Renee Percy	September 5, 2013
15	2	"Mennonites!"	Steven Clark	September 12, 2013
16	3	"Too Cool for Night School"	Charles Horn	September 19, 2013
17	4	"The Broadfather"	Willem Wennekers	September 26, 2013
18	5	"Royally Screwed"	Nicole Demerse	October 3, 2013
19	6	"You Only Try Haggis Once"	Jeremy Winkels	October 10, 2013
20	7	"From My Cold Limp Hands"	Willem Wennekers	October 17, 2013
21	8	"The Fugly American"	Willem Wennekers	October 24, 2013
22	9	"The Man from P.I.G.L.E.T."	Jeremy Winkels	November 7, 2013
23	10	"Pizza with Extra Cheech"	Willem Wennekers	November 14, 2013
24	11	"The Balls on This Room"	Nicole Demerse	November 21, 2013
25	12	"Ass-Jax"	Steven Clark	November 28, 2013
26	13	"Effin' Neighbors, Eh?"	Steven Clark	December 5, 2013

=== Season 3 (2015–16) ===
Fugget About It season 3 episodes
No. overall	No. in season	Title	Written by	Original release date
27	1	"Havana Kill Castro"	Willem Wennekers	October 28, 2015
28	2	"Universal Prostitution and Pizza Fridays"	Steven Clark	November 13, 2015
29	3	"Just Stick It in That There Doo-Dad"	Laurie Elliott	November 20, 2015
30	4	"Confetti Deathblow"	Tony Binns	November 27, 2015
31	5	"Jimmy Gets Goosed"	Andrew De Angelis	December 4, 2015
32	6	"Casino Loyale"	Andrew De Angelis	December 11, 2015
33	7	"Vagina's Got Talent"	Laurie Elliott	December 18, 2015
34	8	"New York State of Blind Drunk"	Willem Wennekers	January 1, 2016
35	9	"Cookie's Ovary-Actin'"	Kyle Muir	January 8, 2016
36	10	"Royal Canadian Groping Pariah"	Andrew De Angelis	January 15, 2016
37	11	"What the Fuck is the Grey Cup?"	Steven Clark	January 22, 2016
38	12	"Sasquatchewan"	Willem Wennekers	January 29, 2016
39	13	"Nonna Your Business"	Steven Clark	February 5, 2016
40	14	"Layin' Some Pipeline"	Laurie Elliot	February 12, 2016
41	15	"Keepin' Up with the McFelchers"	Bobby Theodore	February 19, 2016
42	16	"Horse Springs Paternal"	Willem Wennekers	February 26, 2016
43	17	"Hot, Wet, Amphibious Summer"	Laurie Elliott	March 4, 2016
44	18	"An Unmarried Bra Whisperer"	Steven Clark	March 11, 2016
45	19	"Spicy Apocalypse"	Willem Wennekers	March 18, 2016
46	20	"Vengeance Wore a Unitard"	Steven Clark & Willem Wennekers	March 25, 2016

=== Shorts (2024–25) ===
Fugget About It shorts
No. overall	No. in season	Title	Original release date
–	1	"Gina Whacks McCool?!"	October 25, 2024
–	2	"Jimmy and Cheech Storm the Capitol"	October 30, 2024
–	3	"Gina's New Pandemic Pal!"	November 6, 2024
–	4	"Hot Nut Fun"	November 13, 2024
–	5	"A Sport of Her Own"	November 20, 2024
–	6	"Jimmy Gets Cap'Owned"	November 27, 2024
–	7	"Jimmy's First Hit"	December 4, 2024
–	8	"Many Ears Ago in Sicily"	December 11, 2024
–	9	"Mountie Cold Senior"	December 18, 2024
–	10	"The Grapes of Gina"	December 25, 2024
–	11	"The Mob Catches Up"	February 28, 2025
–	12	"Only Murders in Vagina"	March 5, 2025
–	13	"Cheech's Cuban Dreamboat"	March 12, 2025
–	14	"Cheech's Retirement"	March 19, 2025
–	15	"The Ghost of Don Gambini"	March 26, 2025
–	16	"Brooklyn Tag"	April 2, 2025
–	17	"Effin' Ice Fishin'"	April 9, 2025
–	18	"Got Head?"	April 16, 2025
–	19	"Gina's 11... Minus 8"	April 23, 2025
–	20	"The Littlest Fugitive"	April 30, 2025

== Telecast and home media ==
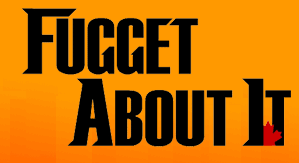
The title card of the TV series Fugget About It, made on January 30, 2012.

The series premiered on Teletoon's late-night block, Teletoon at Night in Canada on September 7, 2012. The series moved to Adult Swim, and the third season premiered on October 28, 2015, with the final episode aired on April 1, 2016.

It was announced in August 2013, that Hulu has struck a deal for the series, and it premiered in the United States exclusively on the streamer on October 13, 2013. The series is currently available on Tubi, The Roku Channel, Amazon Prime Video, and YouTube.

Entertainment One released the first season on DVD as a 2-disc set on September 30, 2014. The DVD features the unrated and uncensored clips from the series. It is made available in both English and French as an audio track.

In October 2024, new 2–3 minute shorts started premiering on the show's YouTube channel.
