= El Muerto: The Aztec Zombie =

Fictional comic book character

El Muerto

Publication information
- Publisher: Los Comex
- First appearance: El Muerto: Numero Uno Edition (1998)
- Created by: Javier Hernandez

In-story information
- Alter ego: Diego de la Muerte (born Juan Diego de la Muerte)
- Species: Human "Zombie"
- Abilities: Has the ability to give life or take it away, Superhuman strength and agility, Resistant to damage/Near invulnerability, Regenerative healing factor

El Muerto (The Dead One), also known as El Muerto: The Aztec Zombie, is a fictional character and comic book superhero created by American comics creator Javier Hernandez and published through his own imprint Los Comex. The comic book follows the story of 21-year-old Diego de la Muerte, who while on his way to a local Dia de los Muertos festival in Whittier, California, is abducted and sacrificed by the Aztec gods of death and destiny only to return to earth one year later with supernatural powers. The character made his first appearance in a xeroxed black-and-white preview comic titled Daze of the Dead: The Numero Uno Edition (February 1998). The initial series of El Muerto was met with critical success and the character's popularity has led to several adaptations in other media including a live-action award-winning independent film starring Wilmer Valderrama.

== Creation and conception ==
El Muerto's beginnings occurred sometime in the early '90s and he was originally intended to be part of a group of Mexican-American superheroes, something along the lines of a "Latino JLA". It was later that Hernandez scrapped the idea and focused mainly on the character El Muerto. The strange supernatural powers that he had planned on giving his creation were toned down and his almost feral look became gentler. Hernandez drew many of his influences from the original comics of his youth; particularly the works of Stan Lee, Jack Kirby and Steve Ditko. Successful self-published creators such as Carlos Saldaña and Richard Dominguez served as inspirations as well. The character was greatly influenced by Mexican culture and mythology; the name Juan Diego de la Muerte was developed as a sort of play on words of Dia de los Muertos and as a nod to both Juan Diego and Diego de la Vega. The character's costume was directly inspired by the traditional mariachi garb and the Dia de los Muertos traditions.

== Publication history ==
El Muerto's first public appearance was in 1998 at the Alternative Press Expo in San Jose, CA. His debut comic was titled "Daze of the Dead: The Numero Uno Edition" and was a in a xeroxed in a black in white format which included the short story of Weapon Tex-Mex a character Hernandez had created prior to the debut of El Muerto. At the same time, Hernandez brought along his newly printed newsletter "The Border" featuring any news on subsequent issues and short comic strips. He later toured the Numero Uno Edition for a year in places like the Wondercon and San Diego Comic Con. For a time, the title was printed under an independent imprint created by Hernandez and a few close friends called Big Umbrella. The imprint ran into financial issues and disbanded sometime in 2003. According to Hernandez:

...[T]he straw that broke the camel's back, regarding Big Umbrella, was that Diamond, the sole, national comic distributor with an exclusive contract with the national comic books direct market, chose to only carry some of the books.

Despite the break-up however, the indie comic-book creators still remain close friends and often collaborate on their independent works. Currently, Javier is finishing the official sequel, "El Muerto: Dead & Confused" which will be the first issue to be featured online before put to press. In an announcement found on his website, Hernandez declared "I've seen the future and its digital...", referring to his plans to release future issues of El Muerto in a webcomic format with collected issues being printed with an option to buy. In February 2008, the comic will be celebrating its 10th anniversary. The original "Numero Uno Edition" has since been reprinted in a special "King Size Edition" which along with the follow-up book "El Muerto: Mish-Mash" is available for purchase on the official website.

== Fictional character biography ==
El Muerto was born as Juan Diego de la Muerte in Magdalena de Kino, Mexico, and grew up in Whittier, California. As a small child, Diego developed a fascination with the holiday of Dia de Los Muertos after watching a film titled "Los Muertos También Lloran" ("The Dead Also Cry"). The film involved a man who returns from the dead on the holiday to visit his wife. When the clock is just about to turn midnight, the man decides he could no longer bear the pain of leaving his wife again for a whole year. In an act of desperation, the man kills his wife thinking they can exist together in the afterlife. However, when she dies the man begins to wither away and turn to dust as there is no one living who can keep his memory alive. About a year after seeing the film, Diego met Issac "Zak" Silver, who was also a fan of the film and developed a growing interest in the Day of the Dead along with Diego. A secret pact was made between the two and they created an "Afterlife Contract" vowing that whoever should die first will visit the other and in turn the other would keep the visitor's memory alive. The film also sparked Diego's interest in Mexican art, history, and mythology. He would spend a number of hours at Pre-Columbian museums and exhibits, learning just about everything there is to know about the subject. When Diego became older, he became an altar boy at his church and held the longest uninterrupted service record at St. Mary's. Despite his beliefs, the study of Aztec mythology often led him to question his own religion. Leading him to wonder what his Aztec ancestors thought when their ancient gods were replaced with Catholicism.

Celebrating his twenty-first birthday on the Dia de Los Muertos, Diego tries to have as much fun as possible, despite the fact that Maria Hermosa, his girlfriend of eight months, has just broken up with him. Anticipating a local festival, Diego dons the guise of an undead mariachi, applies traditional facial markings to give himself a ghoulish look, and tattoos his left arm with a skull inspired by an Aztec temple. When he calls his friends, they are too busy to join him, but his friend Zak Silver, who has become ill, lends Diego his car for the evening. Unknown to Diego, his tattoo was actually an ancient Aztec symbol of death. While driving his car to the festival, he is killed after lightning strikes the vehicle and he veers off-road. He soon awakens in Mictlan to meet with the Aztec god of death Mictlantecuhtli and the Aztec god of dreams Tezcatlipoca. There, Mictlantecuhtli sacrifices Diego in an ancient ritual in which his heart is ripped out with an obsidian blade. Mictlantecuhtli then places the still beating heart in a clay pot and permanently sears Diego's facial marking to his flesh. Soon after this horrific ordeal, Diego is cast back to Earth via lightning bolt, exactly one year after his death. Diego de la Muerte is reborn as El Muerto. His costume, once intended for fun, is now his permanent appearance. Realizing his family and friends already mourn him, he concludes that it is best to leave his home town and heads to Mexico in search of answers.

== Powers and abilities ==
Being undead, El Muerto possesses extraordinary supernatural powers: he is nearly invulnerable, has a heightened pain threshold, rapid regenerative healing factor, super-strength, and superhuman agility. A power unique to El Muerto is the ability to give life or take it away.

== Other versions ==
=== Manga Muerto ===
Manga Muerto is an alternate version of El Muerto, one who exists in a Japanese manga-themed universe. The character made his first appearance in Hernandez's 2000 issue of The Border in a comic strip titled "You only die twice!...OR...Dial "R" For Robot". The strip introduced Diego de la Muerte as a foreign exchange student in Tokyo, Japan. While enjoying a meal of noodles, he is interrupted by the brilliant scientist Dr. Shimahara. Dr. Shimahara was forced to create a giant robot for the infamous Black Moth gang called Skeletron. He reveals to Diego that Skeletron can be voice-controlled but has a major flaw in its design; it will only respond to the voice of a dead person. Diego happily offers his services and easily defeats the Black Moth gang and their inferior robot Skullion. Manga Muerto would later return in a 2001 collaboration between Javier Hernandez and Ted Seko, entitled Super Comics Blast, which included a cross-over between Seko's own Skyman, Fusion Android and a reprint of the Skyman origin story.

== In other media ==
=== Film adaptation ===
El Muerto was adapted into a 2007 live-action independent film starring Wilmer Valderrama as the eponymous character, Angie Cepeda as Diego's girlfriend Maria, and Joel David Moore as Zak. The film also features the performances of Tony Plana, Billy Drago, Tony Amendola, Maria Conchita Alonso, and Michael Parks. The film was written and directed by writer-director Brian Cox with Javier Hernandez acting as associate producer of the film. The film took a few liberties with El Muerto's origin story, adding scenes of a young orphaned Diego illegally crossing the United States-Mexico border and giving the hero additional powers of telepathy and a calming affect when in physical contact with another person.

The official premiere to the public was on March 1, 2007 at the Latino Film Festival in San Diego, California. Subsequent festival screenings included Toronto, New York, San Francisco, San Diego and Los Angeles. The film premiered theatrically at Laemmle Grande Theatre on September 14, 2007 and was later screened at the first annual Whittier Film Festival, where it won the Best Feature Film award. A straight-to-DVD release was distributed on September 18, 2007 by Echo Bridge Entertainment. Despite being titled "El Muerto" throughout its conception and subsequent film screenings, the film was later re-titled "The Dead One" on DVD (the English translation of El Muerto) for marketing purposes. The original DVD release holds several special features including: seven original illustrations by special guest artists, DVD commentary, three original featurettes, a Spanish language track, a slide-show of the original comic, two DVD-ROM special features, wash-and-wear tattoos and an exclusive mini-comic. The DVD is being reissued under the film's original title with the exact same special features.
