= The Retirement Plan =

2023 film by Tim Brown

- Promotional release poster
- Directed by: Tim Brown
- Written by: Tim Brown
- Produced by: Doug Murray; William G. Santor; Nicholas Tabarrok
- Starring: Nicolas Cage; Ron Perlman; Ashley Greene; Jackie Earle Haley; Grace Byers; Ernie Hudson; Lynn Whitfield; Joel David Moore; Thalia Campbell
- Cinematography: Mark Irwin
- Edited by: Robert Brakey; Kurt Nishimura
- Music by: Roger Suen
- Production companies: Darius Films; Productivity Media
- Distributed by: Joker Films
- Release date: September 15, 2023
- Running time: 103 minutes
- Country: United States
- Language: English
- Budget: <$20 million
- Box office: $1.6 million

The Retirement Plan is a 2023 American crime action comedy film directed and written by Tim Brown. It stars Nicolas Cage, Ron Perlman, Ashley Greene, Jackie Earle Haley, Grace Byers, Ernie Hudson, Lynn Whitfield, Joel David Moore and Thalia Campbell. It was released in the United States on September 15, 2023.

== Plot ==
Ashley is acting as a getaway driver for her husband Jimmy and his friend. Following her husband's capture, Ashley and her young daughter, Sarah, must seek out Ashley's estranged widowed father, Matt, for help. Unable to buy a ticket for both of them, Ashley sends Sarah alone to her grandfather. Sarah finds Matt, who is living the life of a retired beach bum in the Cayman Islands. Soon Ashley is captured and the crime boss, Donnie, realizes that the evidence he is after is in the Cayman Islands. His lieutenant, Bobo, and the “General” are sent to track them down and retrieve the hard drive.

Things do not entirely work out as expected. Matt attacks and kills General and Bobo is the sole survivor. He gets away with Sarah and Matt’s truck. Bobo informs Donnie about the situation and Donnie advises him to lay low until he can get there. The more time Ashley spends with Matt, she realizes he has a secret past she knew nothing about.

Matt reaches out to Drisdale, his handler, to get more information about Donnie and his crew. After killing some more of Donnie's men, Matt reunites with his friend Joseph and learns that Donnie works for a woman called Hector. Donnie and his men attack Matt, Joseph, and Ashley but Matt takes out the men.

Sarah manages to escape Bobo who is killed by Ashley but then Ashley and Sarah are captured by Donnie who takes them to Hector's compound. Matt attacks Hector's compound and kills everybody except Donnie and Hector. Donnie manages to capture Matt and shoots Hector but then is shot by Fitzsimmons who is then shot by Drisdale who figured out that Fitzsimmons was a mole (and killed Donnie to cover his tracks). Drisdale's boss arrives and takes the drive explaining it will be used to further his political career.

== Cast ==
- Nicolas Cage as Matt Robbins
- Ashley Greene as Ashley
- Thalia Campbell as Sarah
- Ron Perlman as Bobo
- Jackie Earle Haley as Donnie
- Ernie Hudson as Joseph
- Grace Byers as Hector
- Lynn Whitfield as Francine Drisdale
- Joel David Moore as Fitzsimmons
- Jordan Johnson-Hinds as Jimmy
- Rick Fox as Christopher

== Production ==
Produced by William G. Santor, CEO of Productivity Media, and Nicholas Tabarrok, President of Darius Films, who have a multi-picture deal with the Cayman Islands local authorities. The film was shot on location in the Cayman Islands in 2021. The film was made for less than $20 million

== Release ==
The Retirement Plan was released in the United States on September 15, 2023. It was previously set to be released on August 25, 2023.

== Reception ==
=== Box office ===
The film made $745,000 from 1,175 theaters in its opening weekend, the worst total ever for a Cage wide release.

=== Critical response ===
On the review aggregator website Rotten Tomatoes, 60% of 20 critics' reviews are positive, with an average rating of 5/10.
