= Stuck (2014 film) =

2014 romantic comedy film directed by Stuart Acher

- Film poster
- Directed by: Stuart Acher
- Written by: Stuart Acher; Neil Pollner (story by); Dena Waxman (story by)
- Produced by: Stuart Acher; Joel Michaely
- Starring: Madeline Zima; Joel David Moore; Abraham Benrubi
- Cinematography: John Matysiak
- Edited by: Stuart Acher
- Production companies: Stuck Productions; Stupendous Films; The Mob Entertainment
- Distributed by: GoDigital; ITN Distribution; Premiere Entertainment Group; Lighthouse Home Entertainment; Eagle Films; Accent Film Entertainment
- Release dates: June 1, 2014 (Turkey); October 10, 2014 (United States)
- Running time: 84 minutes
- Country: United States
- Language: English

The Morning After (stylised as #Stuck) is a 2014 American romantic comedy film directed by Stuart Acher and starring Madeline Zima and Joel David Moore.

== Plot ==
Two strangers, who just had a one-night stand, are forced to spend the morning together when they got stuck in a dead-stopped traffic congestion.

== Cast ==
- Madeline Zima as Holly
- Joel David Moore as Guy
- Abraham Benrubi as Bartender

== Reception ==
The review aggregator website Rotten Tomatoes reported an approval rating of 60%, based on 10 reviews. Frank Scheck on his review for The Hollywood Reporter wrote: "Stuck is too slight to make us care about whether its characters ultimately get together. Moore displays a low-key deadpan charm and Zima, although a little too prone to constant giggling, is sexy and charming. But by the time the film is over, viewers are likely to wind up feeling like they’ve been stuck in traffic themselves". Michael Rechtshaffen from the newspaper Los Angeles Times called the movie a "a talky adult comedy that finally succumbs to the confines of its setting despite a cute setup". Serena Donadoni from The Village Voice gave the film a more favorable review, stating: "While Holly and Guy are parked on the freeway, Acher’s widescreen camera also wanders off to explore the surrounding vehicles, capturing moments of exasperation and humor. Acher adroitly juggles all the gimmickry, using it to comment on Holly and Guy’s burgeoning relationship".
