= Defendor =

2009 superhero film by Peter Stebbings

- Promotional poster
- Directed by: Peter Stebbings
- Written by: Peter Stebbings
- Produced by: Nicholas Tabarrok
- Starring: Woody Harrelson; Elias Koteas; Michael Kelly; Sandra Oh; Kat Dennings
- Cinematography: David Greene
- Edited by: Geoff Ashenhurst
- Music by: John Rowley
- Production companies: Darius Films; Alliance Films
- Distributed by: Alliance Films
- Release dates: September 12, 2009 (TIFF); February 19, 2010 (Canada)
- Running time: 101 minutes
- Countries: Canada; United States
- Language: English
- Budget: C$4 million
- Box office: $44,462 (USA)

Defendor is a 2009 Canadian-American superhero film written and directed by Peter Stebbings in his directorial debut. It stars Woody Harrelson as Arthur Poppington, a regular man who adopts a superhero persona named Defendor, with Elias Koteas, Michael Kelly, Sandra Oh and Kat Dennings in supporting roles.

== Plot ==
Dr. Park, a psychiatrist, is interviewing Arthur Poppington, a vigilante known as "Defendor", about his assault of a dry cleaning business owner. The story flashes back to Arthur's encounter with Dooney, a corrupt detective that Arthur believes is in the employ of his nemesis, "Captain Industry", who Arthur blames for his mother leaving him as a child and later dying from a drug overdose.

Arthur is arrested for assaulting Dooney, but Fairbanks, the police captain in charge, sees Arthur as harmless and connects with him because their grandfathers both served in World War I. After Arthur is released, he returns to his day job at a government construction depot. His life is solitary, but after another confrontation with Dooney, he meets Angel, a prostitute who was smoking crack with Dooney. After he is brutally beaten by Dooney's friends, she helps him recover and informs him that Captain Industry's real name is Radovan Kristic. Arthur lets her move in with him, and enlists her help in apprehending Kristic.

Arthur's boss and close friend Paul becomes concerned for Arthur after he finds that Arthur is living at the construction depot with Angel. Paul tries to help, offering Arthur the opportunity to come and live with him, which Arthur rejects. That night, Arthur ventures out to spy on "Captain Industry" and Dooney, and overhears them discussing an illegal shipment. Arthur reveals himself and after a short chase, he is beaten and shot. Angel finds the injured Arthur and contacts Paul who helps get Arthur to the hospital.

While Arthur is in surgery, Paul tells Angel to leave Arthur alone. Angel visits an unconscious Arthur and reveals that she ran away from home because her father was physically abusing her. After she leaves, Arthur opens his eyes, having heard everything. Angered at how Angel was treated, Arthur walks down to the mall and beats up Angel's father, the laundromat owner from the beginning of the story.

After Dr. Park absorbs all this, she admits she's not sure if his actions were wrong. She tells the judge that Arthur is mentally underdeveloped (revealed to be fetal alcohol syndrome) and persuades him not to be too harsh. The judge agrees on the condition Arthur doesn't become Defendor again. A reporter approaches Paul and convinces him to let her run a story about Arthur as Defendor, and he agrees. People are inspired by Defendor's attempts to save lives and fight crime.

Angel becomes desperate for a fix and returns to Dooney. Dooney, recognizing her friendship with Defendor and worried about how much Arthur knows about the shipment, takes her hostage and threatens Arthur to stay quiet. Arthur misinterprets Dooney's demand as never speaking again, and a silent Arthur decides to once again becomes Defendor and save Angel.

Angel manages to escape from Dooney by shooting him in the testicles and reunites with Arthur, but Angel is upset when he reveals he still plans to go after Kristic. She tells him Captain Industry isn't real, she just named Kristic because she wanted revenge on him. In a flashback it is revealed that Arthur's grandfather, in order to spare him pain as a child, metaphorically blamed his mother's death on the "captains of industry". Due to his developmental disability, Arthur has been chasing a delusion his entire life.

Arthur goes to confront Dooney and Kristic and manages to subdue a few henchmen, but is shot repeatedly by Kristic. Arthur accuses him of killing his mother, and Kristic recognizes her name, implying he truly was responsible for her death. As Arthur lies dying, Angel runs to help him. She promises to stop smoking crack and get a job. In an earlier conversation, Angel had revealed she had always had a talent in writing, which Arthur had described as being "like Lois Lane". She promises to be like her as Arthur dies in her arms.

Dooney and Kristic are arrested. Dooney is sentenced to prison and Kristic is extradited to his home country of Serbia. A memorial service is held for Defendor under a spray paint mural that was drawn in his honor, which is attended by Park and her daughter. The film ends with Angel sitting at her typewriter, writing stories about Arthur for a newspaper.

== Cast ==
- Woody Harrelson as Arthur Poppington / Defendor
  - Max Dreesen as young Arthur
- Kat Dennings as Katerina "Kat" Debrofkowitz / Angel, a young prostitute
- Sandra Oh as Dr. Park, Arthur's psychiatrist
- Elias Koteas as Chuck Dooney, a corrupt police detective
- Michael Kelly as Paul Carter
- Lisa Ray as Dominique Ball
- Graham Abbey as Constable Mike
- Kristin Booth as Wendy Carter
- Dakota Goyo as Jack Carter
- Charlotte Sullivan as Fay Poppington
- Tatiana Maslany as Olga
- A. C. Peterson as Radovan Kristic / Captain Industry
- Clark Johnson as Captain Fairbanks

== Production ==
Defendor, whose screenplay was actor Peter Stebbings' first to be produced, was likewise Stebbings' debut as a director. Stebbings wrote the first draft of its script in 2005 when the idea came to him "in one whole piece". Numerous major Hollywood studios declined to option the script because it did not fit into a particular genre; according to Stebbings, "[the studios] didn't want to touch it, but all the actors and their agents wanted to." Nicholas Tabarrok of independent production company Darius Films agreed to back the project after he "was hooked from the very first read", and agreed to fly Stebbings from Toronto to Los Angeles so that he could meet the actors. Elliot Page was originally set to star in the production, which was slated to begin in 2007, but withdrew. Stebbings obtained about one quarter of the film's C$4 million budget from Telefilm Canada and "turn[ed] over stones to find the rest". After he added all of his personal savings, the film was still $100,000 under its financial requirements. Though principal photography was scheduled to take place from November 21 through December 17, 2008, it was delayed until mid-January 2009 and continued through the end of January. Filming took place in and around Toronto and Hamilton, Ontario. Specific filming locations included the Hamilton City Centre, Humber River Regional Hospital and a Toronto warehouse.

To help Dennings increase the realism of her portrayal of her character's sex work and crack-cocaine use, Defendor's producers consulted with Toronto social-services workers and with sex-workers'-rights activist and former sex worker Wendy Babcock.

== Release ==
Defendor had its world premiere at the 2009 Toronto International Film Festival in September. Sony Pictures Worldwide Acquisitions Group acquired the distribution rights to the film in the United States and most of Asia, Europe and South America. The Canadian rights were pre-sold to Alliance Films as part of the film's financing deals.

However, Sony Pictures Worldwide Acquisitions Group decided to not release the film in the United States theatrically, so Darius Films (which produced the film) self-released the film in the United States theatrically on February 26, 2010.

== Home media ==
The film was released on DVD on April 13, 2010.

== Reception ==
Defendor received mixed reviews. Review aggregation website Rotten Tomatoes gives the film a 72% rating based on 25 reviews, with an average score of 6.3/10. The website's critics consensus reads: "Defendor's reach occasionally exceeds its grasp, but this unique take on the superhero genre is held together by Woody Harrelson's solid performance." Metacritic, which uses a weighted average, assigned the film a score of 57 out of 100, based on 5 critics, indicating "mixed or average" reviews.

Linda Barnard of the Toronto Star wrote writer/director Stebbings "fills Defendor with humorous bits, comic treats dropped in quickly and without fanfare", while David Germain of the Associated Press faults the film for its "inconsistent tone".

== Possible sequel ==
Peter Stebbings, responding to fans' questions during the Defendor film's screening at the film festival, revealed that he plans to film a sequel called Defendors.
