= Elias Koteas =

Canadian actor (born 1961)

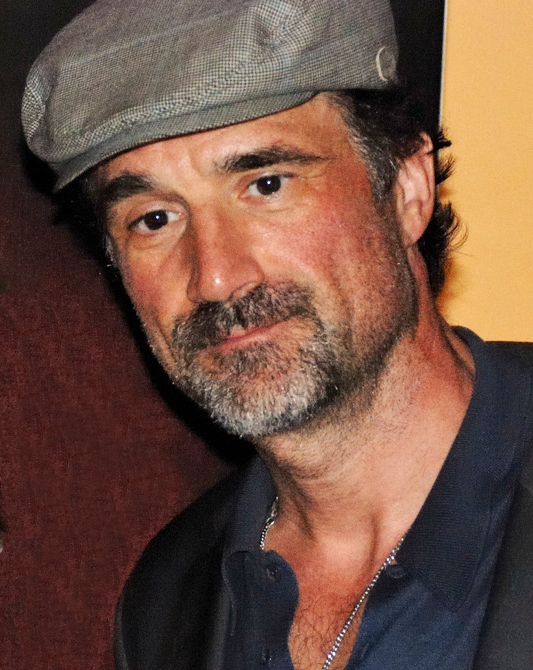
- Koteas in 2010
- Born: March 11, 1961 (age 65); Montreal, Quebec, Canada
- Occupation: Actor
- Years active: 1985–present
- Spouse: Jennifer Rubin (m. 1987; div. 1990)

Elias Koteas (/ˈɛliəs kəˈteɪəs/; Greek: Ηλίας Κοτέας; born March 11, 1961) is a Canadian actor who has performed in lead and supporting roles in numerous films and television series. He won the Canadian Screen Award for Best Supporting Actor for his role in the film Ararat (2002).

He is known for playing Alvin "Al" Olinsky in the Chicago franchise. Among the prominent films in which he has performed are Some Kind of Wonderful (1987), Teenage Mutant Ninja Turtles (1990), Crash (1996), Fallen (1998), The Thin Red Line (1998), Zodiac (2007), The Curious Case of Benjamin Button (2008), and Shutter Island (2010).

== Early life ==
Koteas was born in Montreal, Quebec, Canada, to a father who worked as a mechanic for the Canadian National Railway and a milliner mother. His parents are both of Greek descent.

Koteas is a graduate of the American Academy of Dramatic Arts in New York City as well as Vanier College in Montreal.

== Career ==
Koteas has played major roles in Some Kind of Wonderful (1987), The Adjuster (1991), Exotica (1994), Crash (1996), Fallen (1998), and The Thin Red Line (1998), among other films. Koteas is also known for playing the lead role of Thomas Daggett in the American film The Prophecy (1995) and for portraying sports-crazed vigilante Casey Jones in two of the original Teenage Mutant Ninja Turtles films. In 2010, he played major roles in Let Me In and Defendor, a Canadian superhero film starring Woody Harrelson.

On television, he appeared in season four of The Sopranos as Dominic Palladino and in the season two finale of House as a man who shoots Dr. Gregory House. From 2014 to 2018, Koteas starred on the NBC Chicago Fire spin-off Chicago P.D. where he played Alvin "Al" Olinsky, a longtime undercover detective in the Intelligence Unit. He also appeared in all other Chicago franchise series.

== Filmography ==
=== Film ===
Year	Title	Role	Notes
1985	One Magic Christmas	Eddie	
1987	Some Kind of Wonderful	Duncan	
1987	Gardens of Stone	Pete Deveber	
1988	She's Having a Baby	Himself (cameo)	Uncredited
1988	Tucker: The Man and His Dream	Alex Tremulis	
1988	Full Moon in Blue Water	Jimmy	
1988	Malarek	Victor Malarek	
1989	Blood Red	Silvio	
1989	Friends, Lovers & Lunatics	Davey	
1990	Teenage Mutant Ninja Turtles	Casey Jones	
1990	Backstreet Dreams	Wizard	
1990	Desperate Hours	Wally Bosworth	
1990	Look Who's Talking Too	Stuart Jensen	
1990	Almost an Angel	Steve Garner	
1991	The Adjuster	Noah Render	
1992	Chain of Desire	Jesus	
1993	Teenage Mutant Ninja Turtles III	Casey Jones/Whit	
1993	Cyborg 2	Colton Ricks	
1994	Exotica	Eric/Club's DJ	
1994	Camilla	Vincent Lopez	
1995	The Prophecy	Thomas Dagget	
1995	Power of Attorney	Paul Dellacroce	
1996	Crash	Vaughan	
1996	Hit Me	Sonny Rose	
1997	Gattaca	Antonio Freeman	
1998	Fallen	Edgar Reese	
1998	Apt Pupil	Archie	
1998	Living Out Loud	The Kisser	
1998	The Thin Red Line	Capt. Staros	
1998	Divorce: A Contemporary Western	Matt	
2000	Dancing at the Blue Iguana	Sully	
2000	Harrison's Flowers	Yeager Pollack	
2000	Lost Souls	John Townsend	
2001	Novocaine	Harlan Sangster	
2002	Collateral Damage	Peter Brandt	
2002	Ararat	Ali/Jevdet Bay	
2002	Simone	Hank Aleno	Uncredited
2005	The Greatest Game Ever Played	Arthur Ouimet	
2005	The Big Empty	The Specialist	
2007	Skinwalkers	Jonas Talbot	
2007	Zodiac	Sgt. Jack Mulanax	
2007	Shooter	Jack Payne	
2007	Prisoner	Jailer	
2007	The Girl in the Park	Raymond	
2008	Two Lovers	Ronald Blatt	
2008	Dark Streets	The Lieutenant	
2008	The Curious Case of Benjamin Button	Monsieur Gateau	
2009	The Haunting in Connecticut	Reverend Popescu	
2009	I Come with the Rain	Hasford	
2009	Defendor	Chuck Dooney	
2009	The Fourth Kind	Abel Campos	
2010	The Killer Inside Me	Joe Rothman	
2010	3 Backyards	John	
2010	Shutter Island	Andrew Laeddis	
2010	My Own Love Song	Dean	
2010	Die	Mark Murdock	
2010	Let Me In	The Policeman	
2011	Winnie Mandela	Major de Vries	
2011	Dream House	Boyce	
2011	A Very Harold & Kumar 3D Christmas	Sergei Katsov	
2013	The Last Days on Mars	Charles Brunel	
2013	Now You See Me	Lionel Shrike	Uncredited cameo
2013	Devil's Knot	Jerry Driver	
2013	Jake Squared	Jake Klein	
2017	My Days of Mercy	Simon Moro	
2022	The Baker	Vic	
2023	Janet Planet	Avi	
2024	The Silent Planet	Theodore	
2026	Neverman		
TBA	As Deep as the Grave	TBA	Post-production

=== Television ===
Year	Title	Role	Notes
1985	Private Sessions	Johnny O'Reilly	Television film
1988	Crime Story	Jerry Travers	Episode: "Roadrunner"
1988	Onassis: The Richest Man in the World	Young Aristotle Onassis	Television film
1995	Sugartime	Butch Blasi	Television film
2001	Shot in the Heart	Gary Gilmore	Television film
2002	The Sopranos	Dominic Palladino	Episode: "The Strong, Silent Type"
2004	Traffic	Mike McKay	3 episodes
2005–2006, 2025	American Dad!	Jim/Randy Goodtimes (voice)	3 episodes
2006	Conviction	Mike Randolph	Episode: "Pilot"
2006	House	Jack Moriarty	Episode: "No Reason"
2008	CSI: NY	Joe/Douglas Anderson	2 episodes
2009	Saving Grace	William Drugh	Episode: "The Live Ones"
2011	Combat Hospital	Colonel Xavier Marks	13 episodes
2012	Unforgettable	Sam Rhodes	Episode: "The Man in the Woods"
2013	The Killing	James Skinner	11 episodes
2013–2017	Chicago Fire	Alvin "Al" Olinsky	4 episodes
2014–2018, 2024	Chicago P.D.	Alvin "Al" Olinsky	Main cast: 106 episodes; guest: Season 11, Episode 13: "More"
2016–2018	Chicago Med	Alvin "Al" Olinsky	3 episodes
2017	Chicago Justice	Alvin "Al" Olinsky	Episode: "Fake"
2021	Goliath	Tom True	Season 4; Recurring cast
2021	Guilty Party	Charles "Tuna" Billingham	3 episodes
