= The Marked Heart =

Colombian thriller drama streaming television series

- Spanish: Pálpito
- Genre: Thriller; Crime; Melodrama
- Created by: Leonardo Padrón
- Written by: Leonardo Padrón
- Directed by: Camilo Vega
- Country of origin: Colombia
- Original language: Spanish
- No. of seasons: 2
- No. of episodes: 24

Production
- Cinematography: Diego Jiménez
- Running time: 38–51 minutes
- Production company: CMO Producciones

Original release
- Network: Netflix
- Release: April 20, 2022 – April 2, 2023

The Marked Heart (Spanish: Pálpito) is a Colombian thriller drama streaming television series created by Venezuelan screenwriter Leonardo Padrón and produced by CMO Producciones. The series premiered worldwide on Netflix on April 20, 2022. After its premiere, the series was renewed for a second season, which premiered on April 19, 2023.

== Plot ==
Valeria, Simón's wife, is murdered by a crime syndicate in order to remove her intact and compatible heart and transplant it into another person. This person is Camila, the wife of a wealthy man, who remains unclear about the true origin of her new heart. Simón, desperate and driven by revenge, enters the dangerous world of organ trafficking. Camila, too, increasingly searches for answers and questions everything. Meanwhile, Simón dives further and further down the abyss to find those responsible for his wife's death and make them pay. During his journey, Simón falls in love with Camila, who is allowed to live on thanks to the stolen heart of his murdered wife. When they both find out the truth, things become drastically more complicated and everything takes an even more life-threatening turn.

== Cast ==
- Michel Brown as Simón Duque
- Ana Lucía Domínguez as Camila Duarte
- Sebastián Martínez as Zacarías Cienfuegos
- Margarita Muñoz as Valeria Duque
- Moisés Arizmendi as Mariachi
- Valeria Emiliani as Samantha Duque
- Julián Cerati as Tomás Gómez
- Juan Fernando Sánchez as Juan Carlos Sarmiento
- Mauricio Cujar as Braulio Cárdenas
- Jacqueline Arenal as Greta Volcán

== Episodes ==
No. overall	No. in season	Title	Directed by	Written by	Original release date
1	1	"La felicidad no es redonda"	Camilo Vega	Leonardo Padrón, Doris Seguí, Christian Jiménez & Carlos E. Castro	April 20, 2022
2	2	"Un huésped dentro de mi cuerpo"	Camilo Vega	Leonardo Padrón, Doris Seguí, Christian Jiménez & Carlos E. Castro	April 20, 2022
3	3	"La búsqueda"	Camilo Vega	Leonardo Padrón, Doris Seguí, Christian Jiménez & Carlos E. Castro	April 20, 2022
4	4	"Ese corazón nunca debió ser tuyo"	Camilo Vega	Leonardo Padrón, Doris Seguí, Christian Jiménez & Carlos E. Castro	April 20, 2022
5	5	"La organización"	Camilo Vega	Leonardo Padrón, Doris Seguí, Christian Jiménez & Carlos E. Castro	April 20, 2022
6	6	"Sin cabos sueltos"	Camilo Vega	Leonardo Padrón, Doris Seguí, Christian Jiménez & Carlos E. Castro	April 20, 2022
7	7	"Un momento crucial"	Camilo Vega	Leonardo Padrón, Doris Seguí, Christian Jiménez & Carlos E. Castro	April 20, 2022
8	8	"¿Mi esposo es un asesino?"	Camilo Vega	Leonardo Padrón, Doris Seguí, Christian Jiménez & Carlos E. Castro	April 20, 2022
9	9	"Estamos aquí para cambiarle la vida"	Camilo Vega	Leonardo Padrón, Doris Seguí, Christian Jiménez & Carlos E. Castro	April 20, 2022
10	10	"La terrible verdad"	Camilo Vega	Leonardo Padrón, Doris Seguí, Christian Jiménez & Carlos E. Castro	April 20, 2022
11	11	"El infiltrado"	Camilo Vega	Leonardo Padrón, Doris Seguí, Christian Jiménez & Carlos E. Castro	April 20, 2022
12	12	"La cicatriz"	Camilo Vega	Leonardo Padrón, Doris Seguí, Christian Jiménez & Carlos E. Castro	April 20, 2022
13	13	"La próxima víctima"	Camilo Vega	Leonardo Padrón, Doris Seguí, Christian Jiménez & Carlos E. Castro	April 20, 2022
14	14	"La confesión"	Camilo Vega	Leonardo Padrón, Doris Seguí, Christian Jiménez & Carlos E. Castro	April 20, 2022
