= Benjamin (2018 American film) =

2018 American black comedy film

- Film poster
- Directed by: Bob Saget
- Written by: Joshua Turek
- Produced by: Nicholas Tabarrok
- Starring: Bob Saget; Rob Corddry; Mary Lynn Rajskub; Peri Gilpin; Cheri Oteri; Max Burkholder; Kevin Pollak
- Cinematography: Arthur Albert
- Music by: Peter Rodgers Melnick
- Production companies: Darius Films; Redbox
- Distributed by: Quiver Distribution; Redbox
- Release dates: April 2018 (Beverly Hills); April 23, 2019
- Running time: 85 minutes
- Country: United States
- Language: English

Benjamin is a 2018 black comedy film about drug addiction directed by Bob Saget. It was the first film distributed exclusively by Redbox and the final film directed by Saget prior to his death in January 2022.

Saget cast himself as the patriarch of a family with a teen troubled by drug addiction. The cast includes Rob Corddry, Mary Lynn Rajskub, Kevin Pollak, Peri Gilpin, Dave Foley, Cheri Oteri, Max Burkholder, Clara Mamet, David Hull, Jonny Weston, and James Preston Rogers.

Saget said there are parallels between Bob Johnson, the father he portrays in Benjamin and Danny Tanner, the character he played on Full House and Fuller House. The film premiered at the Beverly Hills Film Festival in 2018.

== Cast ==
- Bob Saget as Ed
- Rob Corddry as Dr. Ed
- Mary Lynn Rajskub as Jeanette
- Peri Gilpin as Marley
- Cheri Oteri as Clarice
- Max Burkholder as Benjamin
- Clara Mamet as Amber
- David Hull as Ronny
- Jonny Weston as Tom
- James Preston Rogers as Ulf
- Dave Foley as Mitch
- Kevin Pollak as Rick
