= Martin Espino =

- Born: Martin Espino
- Genres: Native American music Folk music Ambient music
- Occupations: Musician, Composer
- Instruments: Ancient Mexican Wind Instruments; Native Mexican Percussion Instruments
- Member of: Mexika
- Website: http://www.martinespino.com/

Martin Espino is a Mexican-American musician and composer of indigenous Yaqui and Tepehuano ancestry from Whittier, California. He is best known for performing authentic prehispanic music with his band MEXIKA. Espino spent over twenty five years researching prehispanic musical instruments and performed with many indigenous musicians from Mexico, Ecuador, Peru and Bolivia. Espino's musical inspiration comes directly from traditional Native American/Mexican music as well as ambient improvisations.

As the composer and artistic director of a group called Nahualli Ensemble, and co-leader of QUETAL, Espino has received many awards from various groups including the ASCAP.

Espino continues to lecture and concertize throughout America. In October 2008, his instruments were used by the Bakersfield Symphony to replicate a performance of Silvestre Revueltas SENSEMAYA, and Carlos Chavez SINFONIA INDIA, compositions which were specifically written for indigenous instruments of Mexico, and are usually performed on "substitute instruments". Espino's musical partner Christopher Garcia was asked to help perform the compositions with the symphony. Both Espino and Garcia are classically trained musicians as well. Other than his solo works, Espino has also composed for theater, video and television commercials. Espino was also a contributing artist for the live-action film adaption of El Muerto: The Aztec Zombie.
