= Jonathan Sobol =

Canadian film director and screenwriter

Jonathan Sobol is a Canadian film director and screenwriter. His credits include the films Citizen Duane, A Beginner's Guide to Endings, The Art of the Steal, The Padre, The Baker and Signal One.

Originally from Niagara Falls, Ontario, Sobol is currently based in Toronto.

Date of birth September 11, 1979.
