= Joel David Moore =

American character actor and director (born 1977)

- Moore in 2026
- Born: September 25, 1977 (age 49); Portland, Oregon, U.S.
- Education: Mt. Hood Community College; Southern Oregon University (BFA)
- Occupations: Actor, director
- Years active: 1996–present
- Spouse: Kineret Karen Ben Yishay (m. 2009; div. 2011)
- Children: 2

Joel David Moore (born September 25, 1977) is an American character actor and director. Born and raised in Portland, Oregon, Moore studied acting in college before relocating to Los Angeles to pursue a film career. His first major role was as Owen Dittman in the 2004 comedy Dodgeball: A True Underdog Story, followed by roles in the comedy Grandma's Boy (2006), Terry Zwigoff's Art School Confidential (2006), and the independent slasher film Hatchet (2006).

In 2008, he was cast in the role of Colin Fisher on the Fox series Bones, a guest role he portrayed in sixteen episodes until the series' conclusion in 2017. In 2009, he was cast as Dr. Norm Spellman in James Cameron's Avatar (2009), a role he reprised for the film's sequels, Avatar: The Way of Water (2022) and Avatar: Fire and Ash (2025).

Moore has also starred in several music videos, and directed films: His directorial debut was the psychological thriller Spiral (2007), followed by the drama Youth in Oregon (2016). Moore also directed the film Killing Winston Jones which was shot in 2012 but never released.

== Early life ==
Moore was born on September 25, 1977, in Portland, Oregon, the son of Missy (née Irvine) and John Moore. Moore was raised in Portland, where his family resided in the Mount Tabor neighborhood. He graduated from Benson Polytechnic High School in 1995.

After high school, Moore attended Mt. Hood Community College in Gresham, Oregon, for two years. In 1998, he transferred to Southern Oregon University in Ashland, Oregon, where he earned his Bachelor of Fine Arts degree in 2001 and performed for two summers at the Oregon Shakespeare Festival.

== Career ==
=== 2000–2007: Early roles ===
Before relocating to Hollywood, Moore starred with Gretchen Stouts and Nina Smidt in Tom Monson's Drug Wars, The High Times (1999), a video about underage binge drinking.

In 2000, he moved to Los Angeles, California, and appeared in several television commercials, including ones for eBay, Cingular Wireless, and Best Buy. Moore shot an international campaign for a branch of Siemens cell phones, XELIBRI, which won a Lion Award. Moore made an appearance in the music video for the song "Youth of the Nation" by rap rock band P.O.D.

Moore's first major film role was in 2004's Dodgeball: A True Underdog Story. Between 2004 and 2005, he appeared in a recurring guest role on the NBC series LAX. This was followed by roles in the films Grandma's Boy, and as a jaded art student in Terry Zwigoff's Art School Confidential (both 2006). The same year, he also had a lead role in the independent slasher film Hatchet, a bit part in The Shaggy Dog, and a supporting role in El Muerto, based on the eponymous comic book series. Also in 2007, Moore made his directorial debut with the psychological thriller Spiral, which he filmed in his hometown of Portland, and co-starred in with Amber Tamblyn.

=== 2008–present: Acting and directing ===
In 2008, he was cast in the supporting role of Dr. Norm Spellman in James Cameron's Avatar (2009). The same year, he was cast as intern Colin Fisher on the Fox series Bones, a guest role he would portray across 16 episodes until the series' conclusion in 2017. During the fifth season episode "The Gamer in the Grease", his character invites two other characters, Dr.Jack Hodgins (portrayed by T. J. Thyne) and Dr. Lance Sweets (portrayed by John Francis Daley) to attend the Avatar premiere, in which Moore was also cast. Moore also had a supporting role in Beyond a Reasonable Doubt (2009), a remake of the 1956 film of the same name. He also starred alongside Katy Perry in her 2009 music video for "Waking Up in Vegas".

Other film roles included a supporting part in 2012's Savages, directed by Oliver Stone, and in the crime-thriller Gone (2012), opposite Amanda Seyfried. Moore directed Killing Winston Jones in fall 2012 in Savannah, Georgia, which starred Danny Glover, Jon Heder and Richard Dreyfuss. The film was never released.

He would also reprise his role with a cameo appearance in Hatchet III (2013). During 2014–2015, he had a supporting role in the series Forever, and also in the thriller The Guest (2014), and Joey Ramone in the 2013 historical film CBGB.

In 2016, he directed his second feature, Youth in Oregon, starring Frank Langella, Christina Applegate and Billy Crudup. In 2017, it was reported that Moore had signed on to appear in the Avatar sequels, Avatar: The Way of Water (2022) and Avatar: Fire and Ash (2025).

== Filmography ==
=== Acting roles ===
==== Film ====
Year	Title	Role	Notes
1996	Foxfire	First Geek	
2000	Drug Wars, The High Times	Jake	
2004	Raising Genius	Rolf	
2004	Dodgeball: A True Underdog Story	Owen Dittman	
2005	Reel Guerrillas	Nick Walker	The Dukes of Hazzard: The Beginning
2006	Grandma's Boy	J.P.	
2006	The Shaggy Dog	Pound employee	
2006	Art School Confidential	Bardo	
2006	Miles from Home	Miles	Short film
2006	The Elder Son	Kenny	
2006	Hatchet	Ben	
2007	American Hustle	3rd Spartan	
2007	El Muerto	Issac "Zak" Silver	
2007	Spiral	Mason	Also co-director and co-screenwriter
2007	Shanghai Kiss	Joe Silverman	
2008	The Hottie and the Nottie	Nate Cooper	Golden Raspberry Award for Worst Screen Couple (with Paris Hilton)
2008	Wieners	Greg King	
2008	The Tiffany Problem	Sam Hane	Short film
2008	Fairy Tale Police	Big Bad Wolf	
2009	Beyond a Reasonable Doubt	Corey Finley	
2009	Bed Ridden	Jay	Short film
2009	Stuntmen	Troy Lebowski	
2009	Avatar	Dr. Norm Spellman	
2010	The Third Rule	Peter	Short film
2010	Janie Jones	Dave	
2011	Chillerama	Adolf Hitler	Segment: "The Diary of Anne Frankenstein"
2011	Grassroots	Grant Cogswell	
2011	Julia X 3D	Sam	
2011	Shark Night	Gordon Guthrie	
2012	Gone	Nick Massey	
2012	Jewtopia	Adam Lipschitz	
2012	Savages	Craig	
2013	Hatchet III	Ben	Cameo
2013	CBGB	Joey Ramone	
2014	The Guest	Craig	
2014	#Stuck	Guy	
2014	Grace: The Possession	Luke	
2015	Divine Access	Nigel	
2017	Drone	Gary	
2020	Cut Throat City	Peter Felton	
2020	The Morning After	Guy	
2022	The Immaculate Room	Jason Wright	
2022	Daniel's Gotta Die	Daniel Powell	
2022	The Baker	Peter	
2022	Avatar: The Way of Water	Dr. Norm Spellman	
2023	The Retirement Plan	Fitzsimmons	
2025	Kinda Pregnant	Mark	
2025	Avatar: Fire and Ash	Dr. Norm Spellman	

==== Television ====
Year	Title	Role	Notes
2001	City Guys	Hoover	1 episode
2001–2002	Boston Public	Hartzell	2 episodes
2002	Deep Cover	Pete Steinem	
2002	Boomtown	Usher #2	Episode: "Insured by Smith & Wesson"
2002	Providence	Howard	Episode: "The Eleventh Hour"
2003	Sabrina, the Teenage Witch	Pete	Episode: "Romance Looming"
2003	Angel	Karl Vamp	Episode: "Salvage"
2003	Six Feet Under	Video Clerk	Episode: "The Opening"
2003	Strong Medicine	Dan	Episode: "Bad Liver"
2004	The Amazing Westermans		Television film
2004	The Guardian	Malcolm Reeves	Episode: "Sparkle"
2004–2005	LAX	Eddie Carson	Recurring role, 9 episodes
2005	Cooked	Mike	Television film
2005	The Inside	Brian Pines	Episode: "Declawed"
2005	CSI: Crime Scene Investigation	Guy in the Yellow Hat	Episode: "Dog Eat Dog"
2005–2006	E-Ring	Greg – NSA Liaison	Recurring role, 5 episodes
2007	The Dukes of Hazzard: The Beginning	Cooter Davenport	Television film
2007	House M.D.	Eddie	Episodes: "One Day, One Room", "Act Your Age"
2008	My Name Is Earl	Clyde	Episode: "Quit Your Snitchin'"
2008–2017	Bones	Colin Fisher	Recurring role, 16 episodes
2009–2010	Medium	Keith Bruning	4 episodes
2010	Chuck	Mackintosh	Episode: "Chuck Versus the Couch Lock"
2011	Hawaii Five-0	Sheldon Tunney	Episode: "Kai e'e"
2011	Last Man Standing	Bruce	Episodes: "Pilot", "Grandparents Day"
2014–2015	Forever	Lucas Wahl	Main role
2017	Budding Prospects	Phil	Television film
2017	American Housewife	Captain Beauregard	Episode: "Gala Auction"
2018	Agents of S.H.I.E.L.D.	Noah	Episode: "All the Comforts of Home"

==== Music videos ====
Year	Song	Artist	Notes
2001	"Youth of the Nation"	P.O.D.	
2008	"Beat It"	Fall Out Boy	
2009	"Waking Up in Vegas"	Katy Perry	
2010	"It's Not Christmas Without You"	Katharine McPhee	
2025	"The Great Unknown"	Ice Nine Kills	

=== Filmmaking roles ===
Feature Film

Year	Title	Director	Producer	Writer	Notes
2007	Spiral	Yes (Note: Co-directed with Adam Green)	Executive	Yes	
2012	Killing Winston Jones	Yes	Executive	No	Cancelled film release
2016	Youth in Oregon	Yes	No	No	
2021	Hide and Seek	Yes	Yes	Yes	
2023	Some Other Woman	Yes	Yes	No	

As producer

- Etienne! (2009)
- The Immaculate Room (2022)
- Bride Hard (2025)
- Dead Man's Wire (2025)
- The Leader (2026)

As executive producer

- Shadowheart (2009)
- Jewtopia (2012)
- Stuck (2014)
- Paint (2023)
- Desperation Road (2023)

Short Film

Year	Title	Director	Writer
2006	Miles from Home	Yes	Yes
2009	Found (Note: Music video for Byron Phillips)	Yes	No
2010	Hours Before	Yes	Yes
