= Stockholm (2018 film) =

2018 film by Robert Budreau

- Theatrical release poster
- Directed by: Robert Budreau
- Written by: Robert Budreau
- Produced by: Nicholas Tabarrok; Robert Budreau; Jonathan Bronfman
- Starring: Ethan Hawke; Noomi Rapace; Mark Strong; Christopher Heyerdahl; Bea Santos; Thorbjørn Harr; John Ralston
- Cinematography: Brendan Steacy
- Edited by: Richard Comeau
- Music by: Steve London
- Production companies: Blumhouse Productions; Darius Films; JoBro Productions; Lumanity Productions
- Distributed by: Smith Global Media
- Release dates: April 19, 2018 (Tribeca); April 12, 2019 (United States)
- Running time: 92 minutes
- Countries: Canada; United States
- Language: English
- Box office: $1.1 million

Stockholm (known as The Captor in some countries) is a 2018 crime comedy-drama film written, produced and directed by Robert Budreau. It stars Ethan Hawke, Noomi Rapace, Mark Strong, Christopher Heyerdahl, Bea Santos and Thorbjørn Harr. The film premiered at the Tribeca Film Festival on April 19, 2018, and was released on April 12, 2019, by Smith Global Media. The film is loosely based on the true story of the 1973 bank heist and hostage crisis in Stockholm.

== Synopsis ==
After taking hostages in a Stockholm bank, ex-con Lars Nystrom demands the release of his old partner in crime from prison. As the situation escalates, Lars starts to let down his guard as he develops an uneasy bond with one of the female employees.

== Cast ==
- Noomi Rapace as Bianca Lind
- Ethan Hawke as Kaj Hansson / Lars Nystrom
- Mark Strong as Gunnar Sorensson
- Christopher Heyerdahl as Chief Mattsson
- Bea Santos as Klara Mardh
- Mark Rendall as Elov Eriksson
- Ian Matthews as Detective Vinter
- John Ralston as Detective Jackobsson
- Shanti Roney as Olof Palme
- Christopher Wagelin as Vincent
- Thorbjørn Harr as Christopher Lind

== Production ==
On January 27, 2017, it was announced that Noomi Rapace and Ethan Hawke would be starring in Stockholm with Robert Budreau writing, producing and directing the film.

Principal photography on the film began in April 2017.

== Reception ==
=== Box office ===
Stockholm grossed $292,590 in the United States and Canada and $399,924 in other territories for a worldwide total of $692,514.

=== Critical reception ===
On review aggregator Rotten Tomatoes, the film holds an approval rating of 70%, based on 84 reviews, with an average rating of 6/10. The website's consensus reads, "Stockholm can't quite do justice to its themes or the real-life events it dramatizes, but a light touch and well-chosen cast keep the end results consistently entertaining." On Metacritic, the film holds a rating of 54 out of 100, based on 18 critics, indicating "mixed or average reviews".

=== Accolades ===
Award	Date of ceremony	Category	Recipient(s)	Result	Ref(s)
Canadian Screen Awards	31 March 2019	Best Adapted Screenplay	Robert Budreau	Won	
Canadian Screen Awards	31 March 2019	Best Costume Design	Lea Carlson	Nominated	
Canadian Screen Awards	31 March 2019	Best Editing	Richard Comeau	Nominated	
Canadian Screen Awards	31 March 2019	Best Sound Editing	Lee Walpole and Thomas Huhn	Nominated	
Canadian Screen Awards	31 March 2019	Achievement in Hair	Peggy Kyriakidou	Won	
Canadian Screen Awards	31 March 2019	Achievement in Visual Effects	Fredrik Nord	Nominated	
Canadian Society of Cinematographers Awards	23 March 2019	Theatrical Feature Cinematography	Brendan Steacy	Won	
Directors Guild of Canada Awards	26 October 2019	Outstanding Directorial Achievement in Feature Film	Robert Budreau	Won	

== See also ==
- Stockholm syndrome
- Berlin Syndrome (film)
