= Brendan Steacy =

Canadian cinematographer

Brendan Steacy is a Canadian cinematographer. He is most noted as a two-time Canadian Screen Award nominee for Best Cinematography, receiving nods at the 1st Canadian Screen Awards in 2013 for Still Mine and at the 8th Canadian Screen Awards in 2020 for Lucky Day.

He has also been a Canadian Screen Award nominee for Best Photography in a Drama Program or Series at the 6th Canadian Screen Awards in 2018 for Alias Grace, a two-time Canadian Society of Cinematographers award winner for his work on Alias Grace and Stockholm, a CSC nominee for his work on Backstabbing for Beginners and Titans, and a two-time American Society of Cinematographers award nominee for his work on Alias Grace, Titans, and Clarice.

His other credits have included the films Ham & Cheese (2004), The Answer Key (2007), Sand Serpents (2009), Small Town Murder Songs (2010), The Lesser Blessed (2012), The Last Exorcism Part II (2013), Coconut Hero (2015), The Intruders (2015), Lavender (2016) and Flashback (2020), as well as music videos for Belly ("Ridin'" and "Hot Girl"), Skye Sweetnam ("Human"), Shelby Lynne ("Anyone Who Had a Heart"), Marianas Trench ("Say Anything"), Feist ("Honey Honey") and Kevin Drew ("You in Your Were").
