= Youth in Oregon =

- Theatrical release poster
- Directed by: Joel David Moore
- Written by: Andrew Eisen
- Produced by: Joey Carey; Morgan White; Stefan Nowicki
- Starring: Frank Langella; Billy Crudup; Christina Applegate; Nicola Peltz; Mary Kay Place; Josh Lucas; Will Janowitz
- Cinematography: Ross Riege
- Edited by: Michael Taylor
- Music by: Joel P. West
- Production companies: Sundial Pictures; Campfire
- Distributed by: Orion Pictures; Samuel Goldwyn Films
- Release dates: April 16, 2016 (Tribeca Film Festival); February 3, 2017 (United States)
- Running time: 105 minutes
- Country: United States
- Language: English

Youth in Oregon is a 2016 American comedy-drama film directed by Joel David Moore and starring Frank Langella, Billy Crudup, Christina Applegate, Nicola Peltz, Mary Kay Place, and Josh Lucas.

The film had its world premiere at the Tribeca Film Festival on April 16, 2016. The film was released in theaters on February 3, 2017, by Orion Pictures and Samuel Goldwyn Films.

== Premise ==
A man is tasked with driving his embittered 80-year-old father-in-law cross country to be legally euthanized in Oregon, while along the way helping him rediscover a reason for living.

== Cast ==
- Frank Langella as Raymond Engersol
- Billy Crudup as Brian Gleason
- Christina Applegate as Kate Gleason
- Nicola Peltz as Annie Gleason
- Mary Kay Place as Estelle Engersol
- Josh Lucas as Danny Engersol
- Alex Shaffer as Nick Gleason

== Production ==
The project was announced in April 2014, with the hiring of Joel David Moore to direct a script by Andrew Eisen. In March 2015, Frank Langella was cast in the film's leading role. The Hollywood Reporter announced that Billy Crudup had joined the cast in May 2015. In June 2015, it was reported that Christina Applegate would co-star. That same month, Josh Lucas was cast in the film. In early July 2015, Nicola Peltz was cast to portray the daughter of Crudup and Applegate.

Principal photography began on June 20, 2015, in New York City. Filming concluded on July 20, 2015.

== Release ==
The film had its world premiere at the Tribeca Film Festival on April 16, 2016. Shortly after, Orion Pictures and Samuel Goldwyn Films acquired distribution rights and set the film for a February 3, 2017, release.

== Reception ==
On the review aggregator website Rotten Tomatoes, 45% of 20 critics' reviews are positive.
