= Wilmer Valderrama =

Venezuelan-American actor (born 1980)

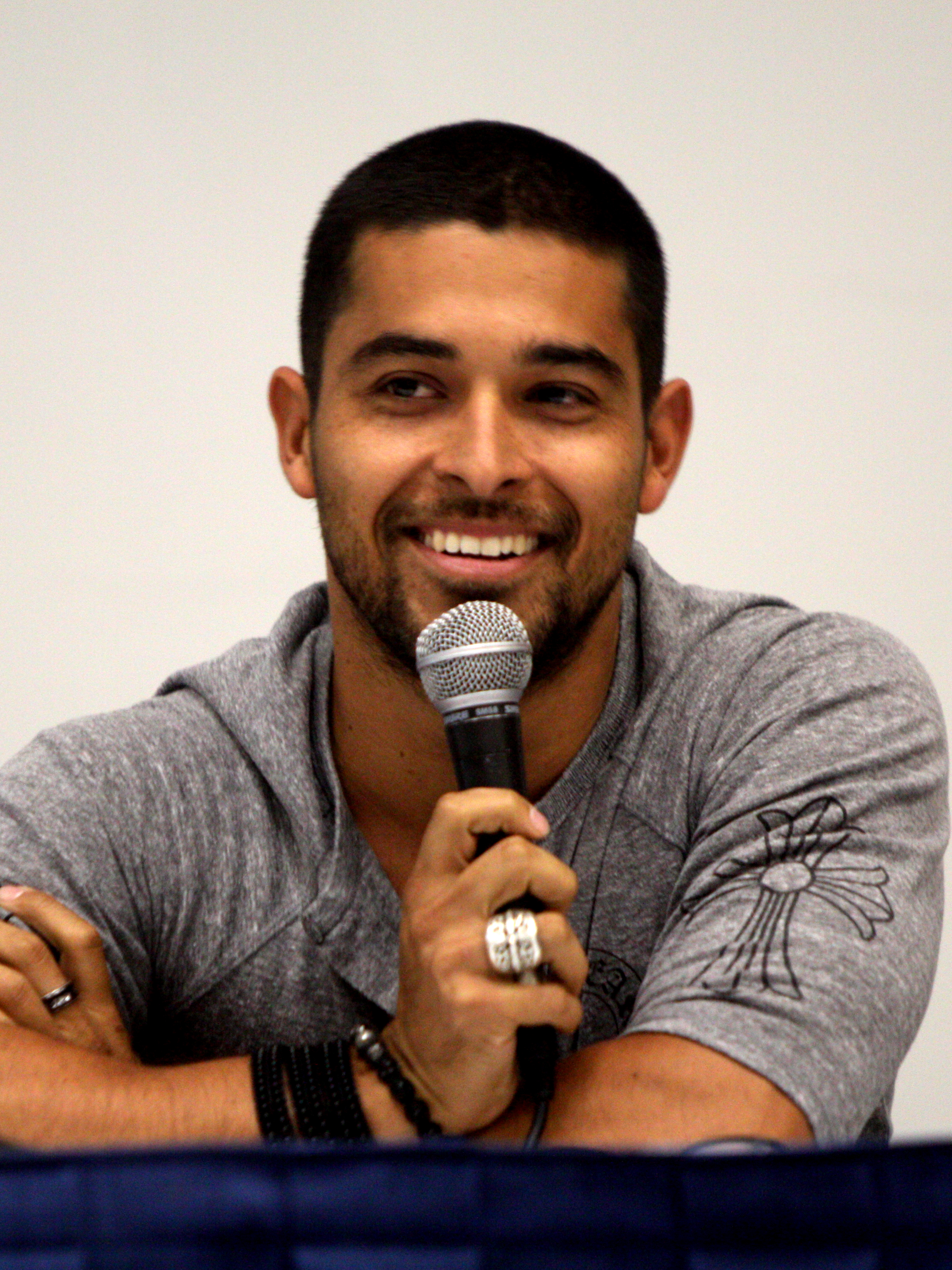
- Valderrama at the 2012 VidCon
- Born: Wilmer Eduardo Valderrama; January 30, 1980 (age 46); Miami, Florida, U.S.
- Occupations: Actor; activist
- Years active: 1998–present
- Partner(s): Amanda Pacheco (2019–present; engaged)
- Children: 2

Wilmer Eduardo Valderrama (/ˌvɑːldəˈrɑːmə/ VAHL-də-RAH-mə; born January 30, 1980) is an American actor. He is known for his role as Fez in the sitcom That '70s Show (1998–2006), his current role as Special Agent Nick Torres in NCIS (2016–present), and Agustín Madrigal in Encanto. He was also host of the MTV series Yo Momma (2006–07), the voice of Manny from the Playhouse Disney/Disney Junior animated series Handy Manny (2006–2013), and played Carlos Madrigal in From Dusk till Dawn: The Series (2014–2016). He has had recurring roles on Grey's Anatomy as well as The Ranch (both in 2016).

Valderrama has further performed in several prominent feature films, including Party Monster (2003), Beauty Shop (2005), Fast Food Nation (2006), Unaccompanied Minors (2006), Larry Crowne (2011), and The Adderall Diaries (2015). He voiced the character of Prince Philippe Charming in the family animated film Charming (2018).

In addition to his acting career, Valderrama tours extensively as Global Ambassador for the United Service Organizations (USO), works with the voting rights organization Voto Latino, and co-founded the non-profit Harness.

== Early life ==
Valderrama was born in 1980 in Miami, Florida, to Balbino A. and Sobeida Valderrama. He moved to Venezuela at age 3 and grew up there until the age of 13 when his family moved back to the U.S. His father is Venezuelan and his mother is Colombian.

== Career ==
=== Television and film career ===
Valderrama got his start performing in numerous plays, including A Midsummer Night's Dream and Rumors. He made his professional debut in a Spanish-language Pacific Bell commercial. At his drama teacher's suggestion, he got an agent and was cast in the CBS miniseries Four Corners and in Omba Mokomba on the Disney Channel. He made his big-screen debut in the film Summer Catch.

Valderrama played Fez on That '70s Show from 1998 to 2006; he was a senior in high school when the pilot episode was filmed. He played DJ Keoki in the 2003 film Party Monster. He produced and hosted the MTV series Yo Momma from 2006 to 2007, and appeared three times on Punk'd, hosted by fellow That '70s Show alumnus Ashton Kutcher.

In April and May 2003, Valderrama appeared in the Los Angeles Times critic's choice play Blackout, an adaptation of the feature film Drunks, and on April 4, 2004, starred in the Actors' Fund of America one-performance only reading of Sunset Boulevard. He filmed the short film La torcedura in which he played the lead, and appeared in The Darwin Awards, an independent film directed by Finn Taylor.

In animation work, Valderrama voiced Rodrigo in Clifford's Really Big Movie. He also voices the main character, Manny, in Disney Channel's Handy Manny series for preschoolers. He had a starring role in El Muerto, an indie film directed by Brian Cox and based on the comic book created by Javier Hernandez. In January 2007, Valderrama launched his own men's fashion label called "Calavena". His production company is WV Entertainment.

In 2010, Valderrama guest-starred on Disney Channel's series Wizards of Waverly Place playing the role of Theresa Russo's brother, Ernesto. In 2011, he appeared in three episodes of USA Network's Royal Pains as Eric Kassabian, an art dealer. In 2012, Valderrama co-hosted Premios Juventud as a superhero on July 19, 2012. In August 2012, he appeared in house music group Nomads' music video of "Addicted to Love".

On September 27, 2013, Valderrama won an ALMA Award for Outstanding Social Activism. By late November 2013, Valderrama had joined the cast of From Dusk till Dawn: The Series.

On June 16, 2016, Valderrama joined NCIS in its fourteenth season. He is a series regular as NCIS Special Agent Nicholas Torres. This led to crossover appearances on spin-offs NCIS: New Orleans and NCIS: Hawaiʻi.

Wilmer also voiced Gaxton in the 2020 Disney/Pixar animated feature film, Onward. In 2021 he lent his voice to the Disney animated film Encanto. In December 2021, Wilmer was set to executive produce and star in an untitled Zorro series for Disney Branded Television. On April 30, 2022, it was announced that Valderrama would have a guest appearance in the follow-up sitcom, That '90s Show.

=== Music career ===
On May 11, 2011, Valderrama released the song "The Way I Fiesta", which he performed as his alter ego, Eduardo Fresco. The video was directed by Akiva Schaffer from the group The Lonely Island. Danny Masterson, Valderrama's co-star from That '70s Show, has a cameo appearance in the video. Valderrama appeared in the 2009 music video for Wisin & Yandel's song "Imagínate". He also appeared in and produced the 2011 video for LMFAO's song "Sexy and I Know It". At the Billboard Latin Music Awards, he said that he is making music which he will release in Spanish and English. On July 27, 2012, he interviewed Latina and said that he is recording tracks and is working with great artists/producers from both the English and the Spanish side. He said he was hoping to release more music in 2013. On March 10, 2014, Valderrama revealed that a Salud Part 2 is in the works and that his new music would be coming out towards the end of the summer of 2014.

== Activism and philanthropy ==
=== United Service Organizations ===
Since 2007, Valderrama has taken part in multiple tours on behalf of the USO. He has traveled more than 46 times and made hosting appearances in locations including Bagram air base in Afghanistan, as well as Iraq, Germany, Poland, South Korea, and Bahrain. In 2021, Valderrama was named a USO Global Ambassador along with singer Kellie Pickler.

=== Harness ===
In 2017, Valderrama co-founded Harness with America Ferrera and Ryan Piers Williams, with the stated goal of improving representation in historically marginalized communities. The non-profit's Be Counted campaign encourages the Latino community to complete and return U.S. census forms.

=== Voto Latino ===
Valderrama has worked with the voting rights non-profit Voto Latino since the organization was formed in 2004. The organization promotes increased voter participation and conducts voter registration drives at cultural events. Valderrama currently serves on the organization's impact council.

=== Congressional Hispanic Caucus Institute ===
Between 2009 and 2012, Valderrama served as the spokesperson for the Congressional Hispanic Caucus Institute's Ready to Lead program.

=== Essential Voices with Wilmer Valderrama ===
In July 2021, Valderrama launched Essential Voices with Wilmer Valderrama, an iHeartRadio podcast highlighting the experiences of key workers.

== Personal life ==
Valderrama met Mandy Moore when she was 15, and they dated when she was "16 or 17". Valderrama later claimed that Moore had lost her virginity to him, which she denied. In 2004, Valderrama dated Lindsay Lohan, who was 18 at the time; he was 24. From 2010 to 2016, he was in an on-and-off relationship with Demi Lovato. The two met when Lovato was 17 and Valderrama was 29, though they did not begin dating until Lovato turned 18. Lovato later released the song "29" (2022), which was widely interpreted as a condemnation of Valderrama after the singer herself had turned 29, although Lovato did not confirm the inspiration and simply stated, "I feel like the song says it all".

In January 2020, Valderrama became engaged to Amanda Pacheco. Their daughter was born on February 15, 2021. Their son was born on July 11, 2025.

Valderrama is a car collector. He has retained the original model 1969 Oldsmobile Vista Cruiser used in That '70s Show, purchased for $500 upon learning that the show was going to cease production.

== Filmography ==
=== Film ===
Key
†	Denotes films that have not yet been released

Year	Title	Role	Notes
2001	Summer Catch	Mickey Dominguez	
2003	Party Monster	DJ Keoki	
2004	Clifford's Really Big Movie	Rodrigo	Voice
2005	Beauty Shop	Corky	Uncredited
2006	The Darwin Awards	Documentary Filmmaker	
2006	Fast Food Nation	Raul	
2006	Unaccompanied Minors	Zach Van Bourke	
2006	Zoom	Marksman	
2007	El Muerto	Diego de la Muerte / El Muerto	
2007	The Condor	Tony Valdez	Voice
2008	Columbus Day	Max	
2008	Days of Wrath	Daniel	
2010	The Dry Land	Raymond Gonzales	
2011	From Prada to Nada	Bruno	
2011	Larry Crowne	Dell Gordo	
2011	The Brooklyn Brothers Beat the Best	Jason	
2014	School Dance	Flaco	
2015	The Girl Is in Trouble	Angel	
2015	To Whom It May Concern	Sam	
2016	The Adderall Diaries	Josh	
2017	Demi Lovato: Simply Complicated	Himself	Documentary film
2018	Charming	Prince Philippe Charming	Voice; also executive producer
2019	Trouble	Thurman "The Thurminator" Sanchez	Voice
2020	Blast Beat	Ernesto Andres	
2020	Onward	Gaxton	Voice
2021	Encanto	Agustín Madrigal	Voice
2024	A Sudden Case of Christmas	Jacob Randall	
2025	Zootopia 2	Higgins	Voice Cameo

=== Television ===
Year	Title	Role	Notes
1998	Four Corners	Antonio	4 episodes
1998–2006	That '70s Show	Fez	200 episodes
2002	Grounded for Life	Eugenio	Episode: "Mustang Lilly"
2002	MADtv	Punch	Episode: "#8.7"
2003	Punk'd	Himself	3 episodes
2005	Robot Chicken	Fez	Voice, episode: "Gold Dust Gasoline"
2006–07	Yo Momma	Host	64 episodes; also creator and executive producer
2006	The Sopranos	Himself	Episode: "Luxury Lounge"
2006	Higglytown Heroes	Helicopter Pilot Hero	Voice, episode: "Higgly Islands"
2006	Shorty McShorts' Shorts	Nestor	Voice, episode: "Dudley and Nestor Do Nothing"
2006–13	Handy Manny	Manny Garcia	Voice, main role (97 episodes)
2007	That's Our Joe	Almerià	Episode: "Padre De Joe F."
2010	Extreme Makeover: Home Edition	Himself	Episode: "The Williams Family"
2010	Wizards of Waverly Place	Uncle Ernesto	Episode: "Uncle Ernesto"
2011	The Cleveland Show	Diego	Voice, episode: "How Do You Solve a Problem Like Roberta?"
2011	NTSF:SD:SUV::	Enrique	Episode: "Piper Doesn't Live Here Anymore"
2011	Figgle Chat with Fred Figglehorn	Eduardo Fresco	Episode: "FRED Interviews Eduardo Fresco"
2011–12	Royal Pains	Eric Kassabian	3 episodes
2012–13	Raising Hope	Ricardo Montes	4 episodes
2012–13	Suburgatory	Yoni	2 episodes
2012	Awake	Detective Efrem Vega	13 episodes
2012	Special Agent Oso	Manny Garcia	Voice, episode: "The Manny With the Golden Bear"
2012	Are You There, Chelsea?	Tommy	Episode: "Those Damn Yankees"
2012	Men at Work	Eri Ricaldo	Episode: "Crazy for Milo"
2012	Minuto Para Ganar	Himself	Contestant
2013	RuPaul's Drag Race (season 5)	Himself	Episode: "Drama Queens"
2014–16	From Dusk till Dawn: The Series	Don Carlos Madrigal	23 episodes
2014	Matador	Party Guest	Uncredited; Episode: "Quid Go Pro"
2015	Minority Report	Will Blake	10 episodes
2016	Lip Sync Battle	Himself	Episode: "Gina Rodriguez vs. Wilmer Valderrama"
2016	Grey's Anatomy	Kyle Diaz	5 episodes
2016–17	The Ranch	Umberto	4 episodes
2016–present	NCIS	Nicholas "Nick" Torres	Series regular (season 14–present); 200+ episodes
2017	NCIS: New Orleans	Nicholas "Nick" Torres	Episode: "Pandora's Box (Part II)"
2017	The Price Is Right	Himself	Episode: "Celebrity Charity Week – Day 2"
2018	Last Week Tonight with John Oliver	Bird	Episode: "Crisis in Venezuela"
2020	Gentefied	Rob	Episode: "Casimiro"
2022	Celebrity IOU	Himself	S3E07, "Wilmer Valderrama's Surprise Garage Reno", aired on December 26, 2022
2022	NCIS: Hawaiʻi	Nicholas "Nick" Torres	2 episodes
2023	NCIS: Los Angeles	Nicholas "Nick" Torres	Crossover: "A Long Time Coming"
2023	That '90s Show	Fez	3 episodes
TBA	Rhona Who Lives by the River	Pablo	Voice, upcoming series

=== Director ===
Year	Title	Notes
2010	Imagination Movers	Episode: "Mouse Day"
2013	Salud – SkyBlu feat. Sensato, Reek Rude & Wilmer Valderrama	Music Video

=== Music videos ===
Year	Title	Artist(s)	Director
2005	"Ever the Same"	Matchbox Twenty	Phil Harder
2006	"Easy"	Paula DeAnda, Bow Wow	Billie Woodruff
2009	"Tu No Eres Para Mi"	Fanny Lu	
2010	"Imagínate"	Wisin & Yandel, T-Pain	Jessy Terrero
2011	"Sexy and I Know It"	LMFAO	Mickey Finnegan
2014	"Really Don't Care"	Demi Lovato, Cher Lloyd	Ryan Pallotta
2014	"L.A. Love (La La)"	Fergie, YG	Rich Lee
2014	"Pura Vida"	Don Omar	Jessy Terrero
2014	"Nightingale"	Demi Lovato	Black Coffee
2017	"Felices los 4"	Maluma	Jessy Terrero
2017	"Felices los 4 (Salsa Version)"	Maluma, Marc Anthony	Jessy Terrero
2020	"Holy"	Justin Bieber	Colin Tilley

== Discography ==
=== Singles ===
Year	Title	Album
2011	"The Way I Fiesta" (feat. Clayton Vice)	—N/a

=== Guest appearances ===
Year	Title	Other artist(s)	Album
2013	Salud	SkyBlu, Sensato, Reek Rude	Rebel Music

== Music videos ==
=== As lead artist ===
Year	Title	Director	Album
2011	"The Way I Fiesta" (feat. Clayton Vice)	Akiva Schaffer	—N/a

=== As featured artist ===
Year	Title	Director	Album
2013	"Salud" (SkyBlu feat. Sensato, Reek Rude & Wilmer Valderrama)	Himself	Rebel Music

=== Awards ===
- (2022) (NHMC Impact Awards Gala) (Trailblazer Impact Award)
- Nominated – Imagen Foundation Award for Best Supporting Actor in a Film
- Teen Choice Award for Choice TV Sidekick (2003, 2005, 2006)
- Nominated – Teen Choice Award for Choice TV Sidekick (2002, 2004)
- Nominated – ALMA Award for Outstanding Actor in a Comedy Series (1999, 2000, 2001, 2002, 2006)
- Nominated – Young Artist Award for Best Performance in a TV Series by a Young Ensemble (1999)
- Imagen Foundation Award for Best Supporting Actor – Television (2019)
