= Sonambulo =

Comic book character

Publication information
- Publisher: Ninth Circle
- First appearance: Sonambulo: Sleep of the Just
- Created by: Rafael Navarro

In-story information
- Alter ego: Salomon Lopez
- Team affiliations: Xóchitl ("Xóchi"); Julia Verdin
- Notable aliases: Bulo, Sleepless Crime-fighter of the Night, The Sleep-Walker,
- Abilities: Highly skilled luchador, Can "see" people's dreams' Never sleeps

Sonámbulo (Sleepwalker) is a fictional character from the American independent comic book series of the same name created by Rafael Navarro. The character made his debut in Sonambulo: Sleep of the Just, the first of the ongoing series in 1996. The story follows the eponymous character, who in the 1950s became a successful luchador. Due to his rise in fame, Sonámbulo was approached by the local Mafia with the intent of extorting money from him and other special services. Around the same time, the masked-wrestler was plagued by a strange sleeping disorder. Upon refusing the gangsters demands, he was brutally beaten, shot, and left for dead. Instead of dying however, Sonambulo fell into a deep hibernation only to awake decades later, having the power to see other people's dreams and having the uncanny ability to go without sleep. Using his new-found powers, Sonámbulo becomes a private detective against the supernatural underworld of the night. All of the collected stories following the character feature some surreal dream-like quality, keeping with the theme of sleep.

The comic is notable for winning the Xeric Foundation Award and being one of the first mediums to combine elements of lucha libre along with the Hardboiled genre (creating a cross-genre known as Lucha Noir). The comic has been translated into Spanish for distribution in Spain and Mexico as well as French and Croatian for distribution in France and Croatia respectively. The development of a live-action film adaption has been in talks, most notably with the filmmakers of Y tu mamá también.

== Fictional character history ==
The protagonist of the series is Salomon Lopez, before achieving fame as the masked-wrestler known as Sonámbulo, Salomon grew up in a poor "meaningless" town in Mexico. While in Mexico, Salomon fell in love with Julia Verdin who had dreams of becoming a singer. This only depressed Salomon, who claimed to have no aspirations, and knew that being with Julia would only prevent her from living her dream. One day he left his hometown without telling anyone, in search of a dream of his own. He eventually adopted the identity of Sonámbulo and became a successful luchador. Notoriety in the ring led him to act in cinema. Salomon then developed a sleep sickness which involved him falling asleep for days at a time. The local Mafia had approached the luchador many times to extort money and other services from him. After repeatedly denying their demands, the gangsters resolved to kill him. After his apparent death, Sonámbulo was buried underneath the wrestling ring the Olympic Auditorium. The hero did not die however, instead he fell into a deep sleep only to awake thirty years later. Upon awakening, the luchador discovered he had the ability to "see" people's dreams and go without sleep indefinitely. Using his new-found powers, Sonambulo becomes a private investigator, devoting his life to fighting the criminal element and the dark forces of the supernatural.
