= The Art of the Steal (2013 film) =

- Theatrical release poster
- Directed by: Jonathan Sobol
- Screenplay by: Jonathan Sobol
- Produced by: Nicholas Tabarrok
- Starring: Kurt Russell; Jay Baruchel; Katheryn Winnick; Chris Diamantopoulos; Kenneth Welsh; Jason Jones; Terence Stamp; Matt Dillon
- Cinematography: Adam Swica
- Edited by: Geoff Ashenhurst
- Music by: Grayson Matthews
- Production company: Darius Films
- Distributed by: Entertainment One; Sony Pictures
- Release dates: 11 September 2013 (TIFF); 20 September 2013 (Canada)
- Running time: 90 minutes
- Country: Canada
- Language: English
- Box office: $2.2 million

The Art of the Steal (also known as The Black Marks and The Fix) is a 2013 Canadian comedy film written and directed by Jonathan Sobol. It stars Kurt Russell, Jay Baruchel, Chris Diamantopoulos, Matt Dillon and Katheryn Winnick.

The film was first shown on September 11, 2013 at the 2013 Toronto International Film Festival, with later, limited releases in both Canada and the United States.

== Plot ==
Crunch Calhoun is given a seven-year prison sentence after a heist went wrong and his partner and brother Nicky betrayed him. They were doing a job in Warsaw, Poland, which was a 'smooth switch' - essentially they have a narrow time frame to change an authentic painting for a forgery. They were almost successful, but the forger's last minute touch-up was noticed, and Nicky tripped the museum alarm.

Caught by local police, Nicky can avoid a 20-year jail sentence if he returns the Gauguin and rats someone out. So Crunch goes to the Warsaw prison for 5 years, never forgetting Nicky violated the team's trust.

Once released, Crunch initially earns money doing tricks on his motorbike. As the old team has dissolved, Lola the charmer and Francie the apprentice join him. Meanwhile, Nicky is interrogated in the airport by Interpol Agent Bick, aided by the informer Sam Winters, seeking a famous Seurat painting. However, Nicky's colleague has been carrying it.

Crunch gets jumped by Nicky's disgruntled colleague, so he looks for a job with his old team member, "Uncle" Paddy. At Paddy's, he runs into Nicky and the Seurat. Paddy explains that a priceless historical book, the second one printed on the Gutenberg press, needs to be stolen from a customs warehouse, with a 1.5 million dollar payout.

Insisting he is 'out', Crunch walks away with Nicky following close behind. As they go, Nicky picks defenseless people's pockets, so Crunch is able to point out that he does not honor their code, that some people, like family and the defenseless, should be protected. Later, in a bar, Lola seems to talk Crunch into doing the job.

Meeting Guy, their Parisian forger, at the airport, Interpol is alerted. Agent Bick and Winters spot Crunch, so the old colleagues have a private conversation. All together, the team's plan is formulated by Nicky.

Crunch's team gets the 'real' book confiscated into custom's warehouse inside of a huge sculpture of a vagina. Then Guy, posing as an official art appraiser replacement for Paddy's ex Olga, sneaks in the book replica, makes the swap, and leaves with the real one.

As the team celebrates afterwards, Guy tells them about a master forger he aspires to, who helped make millions with forgeries of the Mona Lisa in 1911. This story inspires Nicky to persuade Crunch to forge duplicates to sell to multiple buyers, netting them several times the original payout.

Guy tells them he will need $750,000 per book and a month to complete them while Paddy finds the buyers. Nicky puts in $300,000, and the rest cover the difference. Crunch gives Nicky the opportunity to come clean if he is up to something underhanded, but he does not take it.

However, Nicky secretly creates his own cheaper forgeries by Dirty Ernie to sell to Crunch's buyers before the team can ship them. This way he can split the money only two ways. Ernie asks him how he can double-cross family, but it is apparent the financial bottom line is all that matters to Nicky.

Nicky calls the original buyer, but they claim to know nothing about the deal. A frantic Nicky calls all people and organizations involved in the heist. To his dismay he learns they either could not be reached or had no knowledge of the book.

Crunch reveals how the historical book was a fabricated ploy. His true purpose was to steal the Seurat from Nicky and make a great deal of money using Nicky's idea of multiple forgeries. Meanwhile, Interpol receives an anonymous tip as to the whereabouts of Nicky and the painting that he stole from the partner he had double crossed earlier.

As a thank you to Sam, he receives the original Seurat upon being paroled.

== Cast ==
- Kurt Russell as Crunch Calhoun
- Jay Baruchel as Francie Tobin
- Chris Diamantopoulos as Guy de Cornet
- Matt Dillon as Nicky Calhoun
- Katheryn Winnick as Lola, Crunch's girlfriend
- Terence Stamp as Samuel Winter
- Devon Bostick as Ponch
- Jason Jones as Agent Bick
- Kenneth Welsh as "Uncle" Paddy McCarthy
- Eugene Lipinski as Bartkowiak
- Karyn Dwyer as Ginger
- Joe Pingue as Carmen
- Camilla Scott as Olga Something-Long
- Dax Ravina as Sunny

== Production ==
=== Filming ===
The Amsterdam scene was filmed in Strada Nicolae Tonitza, in Bucharest, Romania.

The aerial pictures establishing "Warsaw" actually show Budapest, Hungary.

=== Post-production ===
In January 2013, the film, originally titled The Black Marks, had its title changed to The Fix. In March 2013, the movie changed titles again, from The Fix to The Art of the Steal.

== Reception ==
=== Critical response ===
On Rotten Tomatoes, the film has an approval rating of 46% based on reviews from 50 critics, with an average rating of 5.5/10. The website's critical consensus reads: "It boasts a terrific cast led by the always-watchable Kurt Russell and Terence Stamp, but The Art of the Steal wastes its stars on a formulaic plot that borrows too obviously from superior heist pictures." On Metacritic the film has a weighted average score of 53 out of 100 based on 19 reviews, indicating "mixed or average reviews".

Justin Chang of Variety wrote, "This lightly amusing heist-movie riff feels as disposable as the numerous counterfeit paintings that exchange hands throughout." John DeFore of The Hollywood Reporter called it an "enjoyable heist pic [that] is more talk than action". Neil Genzlinger of The New York Times called it "a fairly amusing heist film" with a convoluted plot. Robert Abele of the Los Angeles Times wrote, "The actors give it punch, but in the grand scheme of caper comedies, The Art of the Steal is more breathlessly imitative than authentic."

Richard Roeper of the Chicago Sun-Times wrote, "It’s like a low-budget, Canadian version of Ocean's 11, with about half as many characters and about one-tenth the charm and style." Peter Bradshaw of The Guardian rated it 3/5 stars and called it a "heist caper with a swinging-60s feel" with "a lovable-rogue crew of triple-crossers, every one of whom may be scamming the others." Robbie Collin of The Daily Telegraph rated it 2/5 stars and called it a "contrived crime caper" that "borrows from the Guy Ritchie stylebook".

Neil Smith of Total Film rated it 2/5 stars and called it a derivative film that makes viewers feel conned. Angie Errigo of Empire rated it 3/5 stars and called it "conventional to an almost eye-watering degree". Linda Barnard of the Toronto Star rated it 2/5 stars and called it a homage to 1960s European heist films that is "a series of vignettes featuring smart quipping stars randomly strung together". Scott A. Gray of Exclaim! wrote, "The Art of the Steal is a good example of criminal misdirection though: by the time you realize these slick images are completely empty, your money will already be gone." James Adams of The Globe and Mail called it a "lightweight, utterly implausible adventure".
