= Rafael Navarro (comics) =

American comic artist

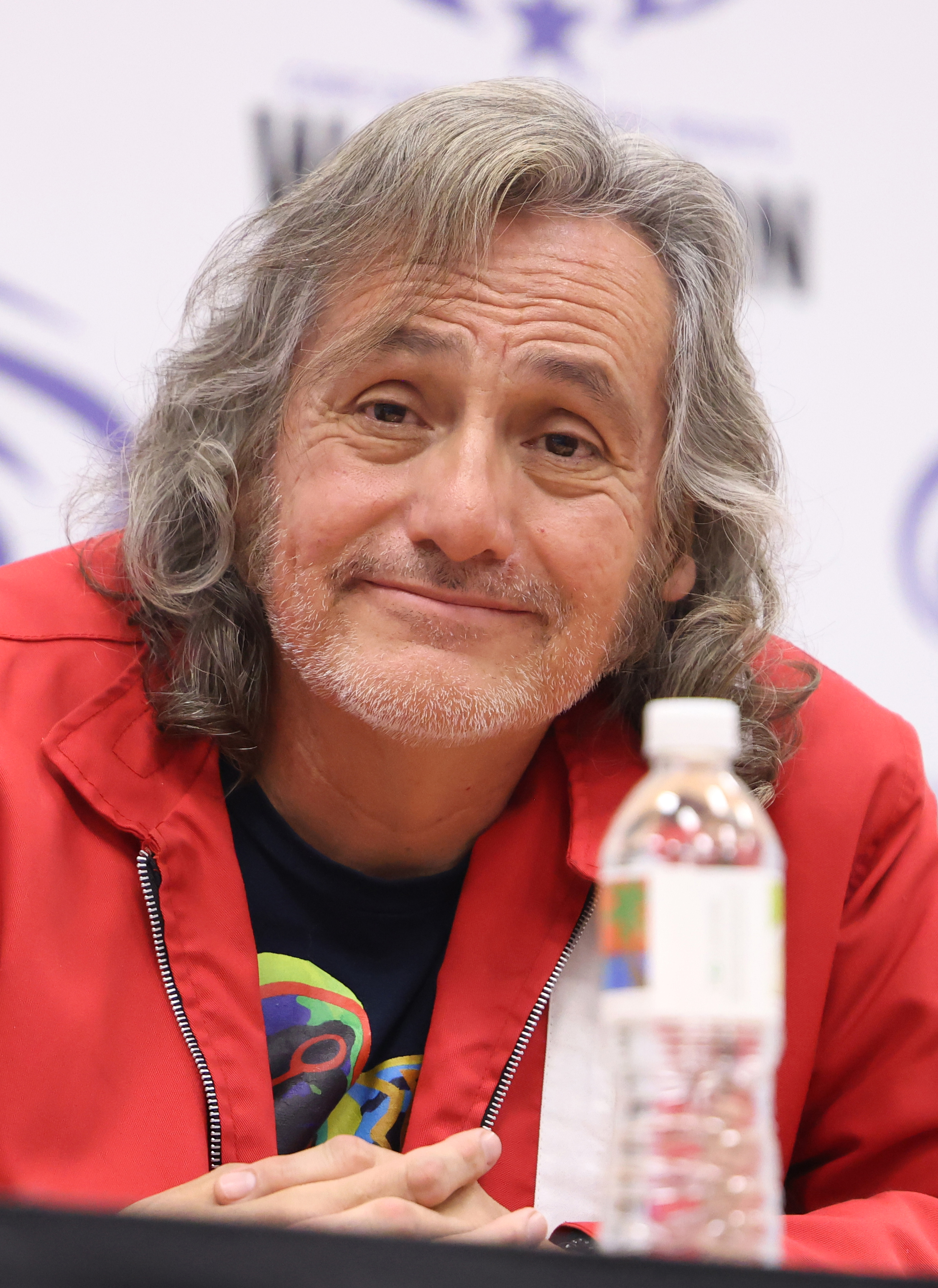
- Navarro in 2025
- Born: Rafael Navarro; 1967 (age 58–59) Sonora, Mexico
- Areas: Writer; Penciller; Inker
- Pseudonym: Raf
- Notable works: Sonambulo
- Awards: Xeric Foundation Award

Rafael Navarro (born 1967 in Sonora, Mexico) is an independent American comic-book artist best known for creating the Xeric Award winning series, Sonambulo, which cleverly blends elements of Lucha Libre and the noir genre. He has collaborated with Keith Rainville and has had work featured in Rainville's From Parts Unknown Publications. Navarro also has experience in storyboarding and has acted as a contributor to several animated television series as Rugrats and ¡Mucha Lucha!. A longtime friend of fellow creator Javier Hernandez, Navarro makes a cameo appearance in the film adaptation of El Muerto: The Aztec Zombie.

== See also ==
- Big Umbrella
- Professional Amigos of Comic Art Society
