= Stephen Adekolu =

Canadian football player (born 1989)

- Adekolu in 2026

No. 83
- Position: Wide receiver

Personal information
- Born: January 20, 1989 (age 37); Brampton, Ontario, Canada
- Listed height: 6 ft 4 in (1.93 m)
- Listed weight: 200 lb (91 kg)

Career information
- University: Bishop's

Career history
- 2014–2017: BC Lions
- 2017–2019: Montreal Alouettes
- Stats at CFL.ca

Stephen Adekolu (born January 20, 1989) is a Canadian actor and former professional football wide receiver who played for the BC Lions and Montreal Alouettes of the Canadian Football League (CFL).

== Career ==
He played CIS football at Bishop's University. Adekolu was signed by the BC Lions on February 27, 2014. He played with the Lions in 42 games, until he was released during the 2017 season.

In August 2017, Adekolu signed with the Montreal Alouettes. He re-signed with Montreal in February 2019. After pledging his first paycheque of 2019 towards a charity combating domestic violence, Adekolu was released once he played in his first game of the year.

In 65 career games (2 starts) across 6 seasons in the CFL, Adekolu caught 4 passes for 50 yards on 12 targets. He had more career catches in the postseason than the regular season, with 5 catches for 48 yards coming in one game against Winnipeg in 2016.

== Personal life ==
Adekolu was spotted by a talent agent following a playoff loss who approached him about becoming an actor; Adekolu has appeared in stage work such as Hamlet, as well as television appearances on Supernatural and Lucifer.

Adekolu is an ally to end violence against women, and pledged his first football paycheque of the 2019 season to Canadian nonprofit organization Shield of Athena Family Services.
