= The Intruders (2015 film) =

- Promotional release poster
- Directed by: Adam Massey
- Written by: Jason Juravic
- Produced by: Jeff Sackman; Nicholas Tabarrok
- Starring: Miranda Cosgrove; Donal Logue; Austin Butler; Tom Sizemore; Jenessa Grant
- Cinematography: Brendan Steacy
- Edited by: David Ostry
- Music by: Joseph Murray; Lodewijk Vos
- Production company: Darius Films
- Distributed by: Sony Pictures Home Entertainment
- Release date: February 24, 2015
- Running time: 92 minutes
- Country: Canada
- Language: English

The Intruders is a 2015 Canadian horror film directed by Adam Massey and written by Jason Juravic and starring Miranda Cosgrove, Donal Logue, Austin Butler, and Tom Sizemore.

== Plot ==
Nine months after her schizophrenic mother Sophia commits suicide, 20-year-old Rose Halshford moves to Chicago with her father Jerry, an architect who wants to help his daughter cope with their loss. But Rose, who has suspended her studies at Stanford University for one semester, does not feel comfortable in the hundred-year-old house, and is suspicious almost immediately.

After speaking with Leila Markby, the girl living across the street, she confirms that her new house may be hiding a dark past. Leila's father Howard soon begins to show strange behaviour. After an uncomfortable night, Rose is surprised by the young craftsman Noah Henry, whom Jerry has hired to do some renovation work, coming into her house unexpectedly. She befriends Noah, and at the same time tries to find out secrets surrounding the history of the house.

While exploring the home, Rose finds a necklace, the head of a doll, and clues pointing to a woman named "Rachel" who lived in the house previously. Noah tells Rose that a few days before their moving in, he saw the windows in Rose's room locked with boards and a padlock on the door. Jerry is skeptical about his daughter's fears and thinks that she is delusional due to her mother's death.

Nevertheless, Rose continues her search and finds reports about the former inhabitants of the house. She finds that Cheri Garrison and her son Marcus accommodated the drug addict Rachel Winacott, who then disappeared. Howard was the prime suspect in this case, but he was acquitted because Rachel was said to have run away. He also explains this to Rose. Noah invites Rose to a pool party and they kiss. On the same evening Leila disappears.

Rose gets a copy of the construction plans of the house from the archive. When she goes to look at the plans, she faints, and is suspected of having abused pills. After her recovery she gets a message from Noah which lets her know about a hidden room. She finds such a room, and is attacked by Marcus Garrison. He forces her to put on Rachel's dress and tries to rape her, but Rose is able to get away, and in her escape she finds a tied up Leila. Jerry arrives home not long after, and tries to help his daughter, but is knocked down by Marcus. At the same time, Rose stabs Marcus with a knife and he collapses. The police and EMTs arrive and take care of Jerry and Marcus, who are both still alive.

After the horror has come to an end, Rose again moves to a new home with her father, continues her studies at Northwestern University, and has started a relationship with Noah. The movie ends with Rose looking out of a window and suddenly seeing Marcus staring at her. A bus goes by and he is gone after it passes, but it is left unclear whether the sighting was real or just a hallucination.

== Cast ==
- Miranda Cosgrove as Rose Halshford
- Donal Logue as Jerry Halshford
- Austin Butler as Noah Henry
- Tom Sizemore as Howard Markby
- Jenessa Grant as Leila Markby
- Michael Luckett as Marcus Garrison
- Mackenzie Ball as Charlie
- Claire Calarco as Cheri Garrison
- Jazmin Paradis as Rachel Winacott
- Kelly Boegel as Sophia Halshford
- Jim Calarco as City Hall Records Man

== Reception ==
On the review aggregator website Rotten Tomatoes, 17% of 6 critics' reviews are positive, with an average rating of 3.5/10.

In a review for NOW Toronto, Radheyan Simonpillai wrote that "The Intruders stacks the deck with all the familiar horror signposts, as if straying from clichés were the most frightening thing of all." On National Post, David Berry wrote that "The Intruders would like to be more clever than it is, but it's hamstrung by a script that's a bit of a fixer-upper."
