= A Beginner's Guide to Endings =

- Directed by: Jonathan Sobol
- Written by: Jonathan Sobol
- Produced by: Nicolas Tabarrok; John Kozman
- Starring: Harvey Keitel; Scott Caan; J. K. Simmons
- Cinematography: Sami Inayeh
- Edited by: Geoff Ashenhurst
- Distributed by: Darius Films
- Release date: September 17, 2010 (TIFF)
- Countries: United States; Canada
- Language: English

A Beginner's Guide to Endings is a 2010 film directed by Jonathan Sobol and starring Harvey Keitel, Scott Caan, and J.K. Simmons.

== Plot ==
Upon learning they only have a few days left to live, three brothers set off to reverse a lifetime of mistakes.

== Cast ==
- Harvey Keitel as Duke White
- Paulo Costanzo as Jacob "Cob" White
- Scott Caan as Cal White
- J. K. Simmons as Uncle Pal
- Tricia Helfer as Miranda
- Jason Jones as "Nuts"
- Jared Keeso as Juicebox
- Siam Yu as Todd
- Gavin Fox as Rahm The Baptist
- Wendy Crewson as Goldie White
- Stephen McHattie as Fitz

== Production ==
Filming took place in New York City in October 2009. The film released at the 2010 Toronto International Film Festival on September 17.

Filming also took place in Niagara Falls, Canada. There is a shot of the Avon Theatre in Hamilton, Ontario.
