= Javier Hernandez (comics) =

American artist, comic book creator, and radio host

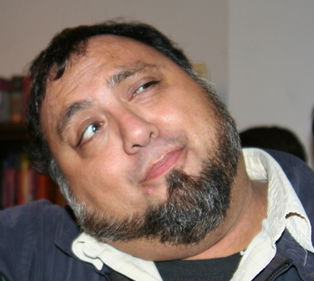
- Hernandez in 2007
- Born: Javier Hernandez; April 23, 1966 (age 60) Los Angeles, California, United States
- Areas: Writer, artist, radio host, associate producer
- Notable works: El Muerto; Manga Muerto; Demolition Dove

Javier Hernandez (born April 23, 1966) is an American artist, comic book creator, and radio host from Whittier, California. Perhaps best known for creating the popular series El Muerto: The Aztec Zombie, the majority of his works are published through his privately owned imprint, Los Comex.

== Early life ==
Javier Hernandez was born on April 23, 1966, in Los Angeles, California, a year later moving with his family to Whittier, California which he now proudly calls his hometown. His early introduction to comic books came when his older brother, who had long grown out of comic book collecting, had left his books to Javier. He would later credit the comics of the 1960s and 1970s as his artistic inspirations. Lucha Libre had an early influence on him, as well as such television staples as Speed Racer, The Addams Family, Giant Robot and The Six Million Dollar Man.

== Career ==
Hernandez conceived El Muerto sometime in the early 1990s, a character originally intended to be part of a group of Mexican-American superheroes. Later abandoning other members of the group, he began to focus on El Muerto's character development. El Muerto would later become a unique blend of Mexican and Chicano folklore, Aztec mythology and mysticism, and comic book pop culture. The character continued to appear in sketchbook to sketchbook until his public debut in a xeroxed black-and-white comic book entitled "Daze of the Dead: The Numero Uno Edition" (February 1998) which recounted the character's origin story. El Muerto was once Diego de la Muerte, a young man who while en route to a local Dia de los Muertos celebration is abducted and sacrificed by the Aztec gods of death and destiny, and later sent back to the land of the living a year after his death, with supernatural powers. Hernandez would later re-issue the story under the Big Umbrella imprint, formed by both himself and fellow comic creators Rafael Navarro, Michael Aushenker, Ted Seko, and Rhode Montijo who, along with Jim Lujan and Raul Aguirre Jr., would later go on to comprise the roster of "The Cartoonistas." Big Umbrella later disbanded sometime in 2003, citing problems in the market-place, and El Muerto has since reverted to its Los Comex imprint. The initial series of El Muerto was met with critical success and the character's popularity has led to appearances and adaptations in other media, including a live-action film starring Wilmer Valderrama, for which Hernandez is credited as associate-producer.

Hernandez surprised fans in 2008 with the creation of a political comic book character, Demolition Dove. The character made his public debut in a preview sketchbook at the 2008 San Gabriel Comic-Con, which included the short story, "A Tale of Two Parties". Following issues are to be published under the Xomix Comix imprint formed by both himself and creator Ted Seko. He has made it quite clear the comic will neither be pro-left or pro-right, and ensures there will be enough content to offend both parties. The character's visual identity was very much inspired by the tough guy archetypes of Hollywood films such as Dirty Harry, Mad Max, and Death Wish. In July 2008, Xomix Comix released an animated trailer for the new series on YouTube.

== See also ==
- Professional Amigos of Comic Art Society
