= The Padre =

- Directed by: Jonathan Sobol
- Screenplay by: Stephen Kunc
- Produced by: Nicholas Tabarrok
- Starring: Tim Roth; Nick Nolte; Luis Guzman; Valeria Henríquez
- Cinematography: Paul Sarossy
- Production company: Darius Films
- Distributed by: Tajj Media
- Release date: September 28, 2018
- Country: Canada
- Language: English

The Padre is a 2018 Canadian drama film directed by Jonathan Sobol, and starring Tim Roth, Nick Nolte and Luis Guzman.

== Plot ==
It tells the redemption tale of the Padre, a rehabilitated convict who is on the run from his dogged pursuer and father-in-law, a United States Marshal Nemes and his hired local police officer Gaspar in Colombia. A precocious teenager, Lena, is a stowaway with Padre who hopes to reach Minnesota. She blackmails and befriends him for joining his journey. The duo plans both a heist and getting away from vengeful Nemes.

== Cast ==
- Tim Roth as The Padre
- Nick Nolte as Nemes
- Luis Guzmán as Gaspar
- Valeria Henríquez as Lena

== Production ==
Principal photography began in March 2017 in Bogotá, Colombia. In November 2017, it was confirmed that Nolte completed all of his scenes.

== Reception ==
Glenn Kenny of RogerEbert.com awarded the film two stars.
