= Ottawa Canadian Film Festival =

Ottawa Canadian Film Festival (OCan)
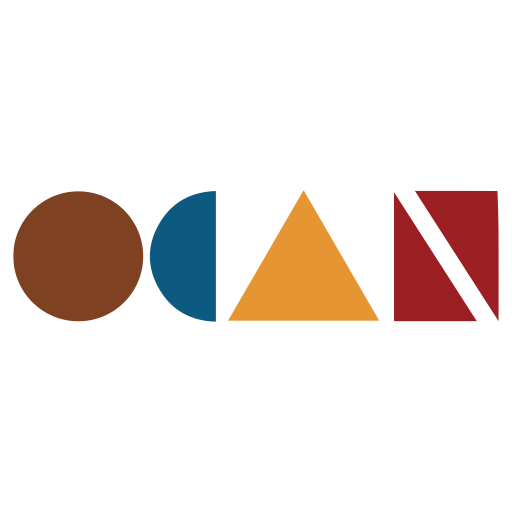
- OCanFilmFest Logo
- Location: Ottawa, Canada
- Founded: 2015
- No. of films: 16 (2024)
- Language: English and French
- Website: https://www.ocanfilmfest.ca/

OCan is a Film Festival in Ottawa that celebrates Canadian film with screenings in November, usually held at the ByTowne Cinema every year. It is a volunteer-run, not-for-profit organization. Films are selected by a jury of volunteers composed of film fans and filmmakers. Screening fees are paid to artists whose films are screened. Also known as the Ottawa Canadian Film Festival, the festival was co-founded by Ottawa-based filmmakers Jith Paul, Ed Kucerak and Blair Campbell in 2015 and collects films for consideration exclusively via a platform called FilmFreeway. The call for submissions usually opens in January.

OCan is listed among qualifying festivals for the Canadian Screen Awards by the Academy of Canadian Cinema & Television.

Co-founder Jith Paul's time on the OCan board concluded in 2024 as the festival shifted its focus and brought in new voices for its next decade.

== Background ==
The Ottawa Canadian Film Festival (abbreviated as OCanFilmFest) was co-founded by Ottawa-based filmmakers Jith Paul, Ed Kucerak and Blair Campbell in 2015. The festival was an evolution of the Treepot Film Festival spearheaded by Treepot Media's Jith Paul. The festival features Canadian independent films of all genres from filmmakers across Canada. The Treepot Film Festival was a series 10 curated screenings at independent cinemas and public parks in the Ottawa area between 2011 and 2014.

OCanFilmFest collaborated with established festivals like the One World Film Festival on screenings at the National Art Gallery and St. Paul's University and partnered with the Ottawa Champions baseball team on short film screenings between innings at games from 2015 to 2017. Independent OCanFilmFest Film Festival screenings began in 2017 and the festival moved to Arts Court in Ottawa in 2018.

In addition to annual screenings, a series of streamed short film screenings 'Shorts at Home' was launched in May 2020.

In 2020 and 2021, the annual festival temporarily moved online to Vimeo's On Demand Platform, due to the COVID-19 pandemic. The festival returned to in-person screenings in 2022 at the Bytowne Cinema in Ottawa.

== Highlights ==
=== 2017 Festival Films ===
Feature Films:

- RAW* (feature film) – Ottawa Premiere - Director: David I. Strasser (Vancouver, BC)
- Broken Mile (feature film) – Ottawa Premiere - Director: Justin McConnell (Toronto, ON)
- Heroes Manufactured (feature film) – Ottawa Premiere - Director: Yaron Betan (Toronto, ON)
- Sisyphus Rides (feature film) – Ottawa Premiere - Directors: Lisa Lightbourn Lay & Tim Alberts (Limehouse, ON)

Short Films:

- Hue Quilted Windowpane – Ottawa Premiere - Director: Lasha Mowchun (Winnipeg, MB)
- Honestly Charlotte – Canadian Premiere - Director: Sarah Hedar (Vancouver, BC)
- Milo – Ottawa Premiere - Director: Jeremie Azencot (Montreal, QC)
- The Talk – World Premiere - Director: Tyler Boyco (Peterborough, ON)
- Poison in the Water – Ottawa Premiere - Director: Romeo Candido (Toronto, ON)
- Andre the Anti-Giant – Ottawa Premiere - Director: Kim Saltarski (Toronto, ON)

=== 2018 Festival Films ===
Feature Films:

- Pur Laine (feature film) - Director: Alexander Cruz (Ottawa, ON) - WORLD PREMIERE
- The True North Project (feature film) - Director: Emil Agopian (Calgary, AB)

Short Films:

- the art of the morning - Director: Nathan Hauch (Ottawa, ON)
- Harevan - Director: Marilou Caravecchia-Pelletier (Montreal, QC)
- Russian Gangster - Director: Maissa Houri (Ottawa, ON)
- As It Was - Director: Blake Garbe (Toronto, ON)
- It Could Be You - Director: Cody Westman (St. John's, NL)
- Away Home - Director: Jana Stackhouse (Toronto, ON)
- Super Bingo - Director: Matthew J. Blecha (Vancouver, BC)
- What We Owe - Director: Bryce Mercier (Oakville, ON)
- Intercept - Director: Kirk Knapp (Ottawa, ON)
- End of the Night - Director: Tavit Melikian (Montreal, QC)
- Angels - Director: Taylor Olson (Halifax, NS)

=== 2019 Festival Films ===
Feature Films:

- The Mayor of Comedy: A Canadian Stand-Up Story – Director: Matt Kelly (Toronto, ON) - WORLD PREMIERE
- Nose to Tail – Director: Jesse Zigelstein (Toronto, ON)
- Trouble In The Garden – Director: Roz Owen (Toronto, ON)

Short Films:

- Baba Yaga – Directors: Nicole Sitanski and Cheryl Taam (Vancouver, BC)
- Dog Bite – Director: Luvia Petersen (Vancouver, BC)
- Fragile Dream – Director: Isabelle Hayeur (Rawdon, QC)
- Girl in the Hallway – Director: Valerie Barnhart (Ottawa, ON)
- Life Via Rail – Director: Jonny Micay (Toronto, ON)
- May Flowers – Director: Marianna Phung (Toronto, ON)
- Newborn – Director: Ray Savaya (Toronto, ON)
- The Order of Things to Come – Director: Tavit Melikian (Montreal, QC)
- Overgrowth – Director: Christian Belisle (Ottawa, ON)
- Rise n’ Shine – Director: Silver Kim (West Vancouver, BC)
- The Still Life of Annika Myers – Director: Matthew Blecha (Victoria, BC) - WINNER, Audience Favourite

=== 2020 Shorts at Home ===
In addition to annual screenings, a series of streamed short film screenings 'Shorts at Home' was launched in May 2020. The series is intended to prepare OCanFilmFest for online and hybrid physical/virtual screenings in 2020 and beyond.

=== 2020 Festival Films ===
OCanFilmFest moved to an online event in 2020 out of an abundance of caution due to the COVID-19 pandemic. Fans can rent specific films for 24-hour streaming periods during the three weekends starting on November 6, 2020.

Feature Films:

- Project Cold Days (Ottawa, ON) Director: Stephen R. Coleman
- The Great Disconnect (Ottawa, ON) Director: Tamer Soliman
- The Manhattan Project (Etobicoke, ON) Director: Matthew Campanile

Short Films:

- Advances (Burlington, ON) Director: Tyler J. Seguin
- and also, for youth (Harrowsmith, ON) Director: Eamon Hillis - WINNER, Audience Favourite
- Guardians of the Grasslands (Bashaw, AB) Directors: Sarah Wray, Ben Wilson
- I Hope They Remember My Name (Toronto, ON) Director: Patrick Weiers
- Inhale (Strathroy, ON) Director: Brian Chambers
- Miracle, Baby (Toronto, ON) Director: C. Hudson Hwang
- Not Your Average Bear (Vancouver, BC) Director: Cliff Skelton
- Saint-Tite (Montreal, QC) Directors: Florence Pelletier, Élizabeth Marcoux-Bélair
- Social Mediation (Toronto, ON) Director: Matt Pittroff
- StreetSauce! Public Art in Waterloo Region? (Kitchener, ON) Directors: Paul Campsall, Tom Knowlton
- Tessellate (Vancouver, BC) Director: Rob Jacobsen
- The Date (Halifax, NS) Director: Taylor Olson
- Vessel (Toronto, ON) Director: Ethan Godel
- WESTBOUND / EASTBOUND (Etobicoke, ON) Director: Rohan Bader
- World Of The Fluffs (Vancouver, BC) Director: Chaisi Glover

=== 2021 Festival Films ===
The 2021 edition of the festival, OCan21, took place online on Vimeo's On-Demand platform. Fans can rent specific films for 24-hour streaming periods from November 12–21, 2021.

Feature Films:

- Blue Hour (Red Deer, AB) Director: Jesse Pickett - WINNER, Audience Favourite
- Company Town (Toronto, ON) Director: Peter Findlay
- I'll See You Later (Chestermere, AB) Director: Bruce McAllister & Jesse Nakano
- Lune (Toronto, ON) Director: Aviva Armour-Ostroff & Arturo Pérez Torres
- My Tree (Toronto, ON) Director: Jason Sherman
- Parallel Minds (Calgary, AB) Director: Benjamin Ross Hayden
- Seeking Oblivion (London, ON) Director: Brent Baird

Short Films:

- Camp Tipsy (Toronto, ON) Director: Jana Stackhouse
- Curbside Pickup (Ottawa, ON) Director: Hingman Leung
- The Debate (Ottawa, ON) Director: Allison Elizabeth Burns
- The Flexed Arm Hang (Winnipeg, MB) Director: Findlay Brown
- Mute (Toronto, ON) Director: Constance Hilton
- Pinball & Perogies (Ottawa, ON) Director: Sammy J. Lewis
- What Flowers They Bloom (Toronto, ON) Director: C Hudson Hwang

=== 2022 Festival Films ===
The 2022 edition of the festival, OCan22, took place on November 3–5 at the Bytowne Cinema in Ottawa.

Feature Films:

- Tehranto (Toronto, ON) Director: Faran Moradi - WINNER, Audience Favourite
- the smallest steps (Ottawa, ON) Director: Nicole Bedford

Short Films:

- Baduk (Halifax, NS) Director: Induk Lee
- L'Entente Cordiale / The Cordial Agreement (Montreal, QC) Directors: Gautier Piton, Clement Douillet
- Magic Trick (Vancouver, BC) Director: Chris Lennox-Aasen
- Plus que des cheveux / More Than Hair (Ottawa, ON) Director: Fitch Jean
- Sarah (Hamilton, ON) Director: Peter Riddihough
- Tears of Oizys (Ottawa, ON) Director: Ramy Raphae
- The High Road (Yellowknife, NT) Director: Keith Robertson
- The Star Mill (Oakville, ON) Director: Daniel Blake
- The Untouchable (Toronto, ON) Director: Aazeh Shahnavaz

=== 2023 Festival Films ===
The 2023 edition of the festival, OCan23, took place on November 2–4 at the Bytowne Cinema in Ottawa.

Feature Films:

- Broken Waters / Brise Glace (Ottawa, ON) Director: Karolyne Natasha

Short Films:

- The Fire Dancer (Whitehorse, YT) Directors: Agnieszka Pajor, Lancelot Burton
- The Gentle Waltz (Montreal, QC) Director: Yann-Manuel Hernandez
- Her Ordinary World (Brampton, ON) Director: Samuel Dayomi
- IDOL (Gibsons, BC) Director: Kris Fleerackers
- Impulse Control (Ottawa, ON) Directors: Mikey Tachuk, Sarah Marks
- Laundry (Toronto, ON) Director: Victoria Zubick
- Leo & Chester (Golden, BC) Director: Andrea Wing
- Life After... (Ottawa, ON) Director: Stephanie Lalonde - WINNER, Audience Favourite
- A love letter (Toronto, ON) Director: Thaïs Despont
- Lunch at the Rideau (Ottawa, ON) Directors: Jane Gurr, Kent Newson
- Margot's Sister (La Soeur de Margot) (Boucherville, QC) Director: Christine Doyon
- The Mess We're In (Vancouver, BC) Director: Jamie Lam
- Pen Pals (Regina, SK) Director: Lucas Frison
- RESTE (Saguenay, QC) Director: Ginger Le Pêcheur
- A Simple Mix-Up (Ottawa, ON) Director: Maissa Houri
- Tiny (Victoria, BC) Directors: Ritchie Hemphill, Ryan Haché
- The Trapline (Squamish, BC) Director: Andrea Wing

=== 2024 Festival Films ===
The 2024 edition of the festival, OCan24, took place on November 7–9 at the Bytowne Cinema in Ottawa.

Feature Films:

- La folle traversée de Philippe (Philippe, a lake and a dream) (Chicoutimi, QC) Director: Stéphanie Gagné
- Stealing Vows (Toronto, ON) Director: Bobby Singh Brown

Short Films:

- Ayam Zaman (The Old Days) (Ottawa, ON) Director: Hassib Hani (he/him)
- Bridge the Gap (Ottawa, ON) Director: Luca Fiore (he/him)
- Desync (Oakville, ON) Director: Minerva Navasca (she/her) - WINNER, Jury Prize
- A Good Day Will Come (Ottawa, ON) Director: Amir Zargara (he/him)
- Gro$ Lot (Jackpot) (Sainte-Adèle, QC) Director: Sharbel El-Showairy (he/him)
- Les mots d'amour (Words of Love) (Montreal, QC) Director: Laetitia Demessence (she/her)
- Nix's Symphony (Waterloo, ON) Director: Karina Loerchner (she/her)
- OCD (Vancouver, BC) Director: Madonna Gonzalez (she/her)
- Radio Bingo (Akwesasne, ON) Director: Shelby Adams
- Safe Space (Toronto, ON) Director: Matt Pittroff (he/him)
- Silent Cries (Kiayunik Tuhanak) (Iqaluit, NU) Director: Navalik Tologanak (she/her)
- The Steak (Toronto, ON) Director: Kiarash Dadgar
- Treat Day (Oakville, ON) Director: Lisa Kockeritz (she/her)
- Triage (Picton, ON) Director: David Rendall (he/him) - WINNER, Audience Favourite
