= No One Would Tell =

No One Would Tell may refer to:

- No One Would Tell (1996 film), an American teen crime drama television film
- No One Would Tell (2018 film), a remake of the above
