= Avery Konrad =

Canadian actress (born 1994)

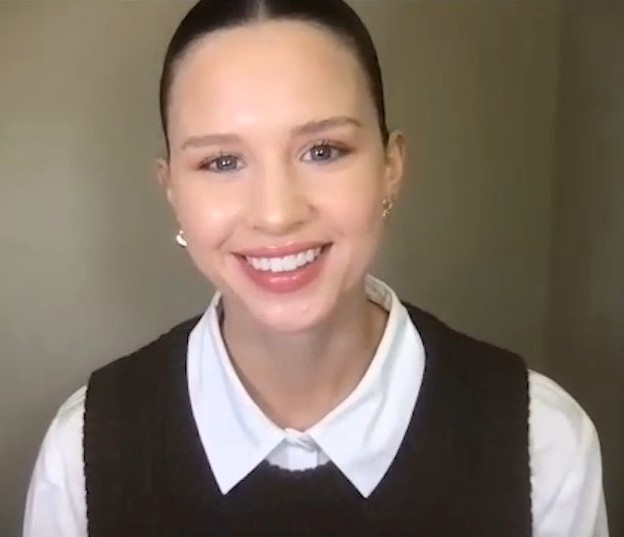
- Konrad in 2022
- Born: December 28, 1994 (age 31)
- Citizenship: Canadian
- Education: Vancouver Film School
- Occupation: Actress
- Years active: 2008–present

Avery Konrad (December 28, 1994) is a Canadian actress, who rose to prominence for her role as Sara Myers in the MGM+ science fiction horror television series From (2022–present).

== Early life ==
Konrad was born on December 28, 1994, in Vancouver, British Columbia. She began acting at a young age, receiving intensive training at the Vancouver Film School.

== Career ==
In 2008, Konrad made her first on-screen appearance in the short film, Skies Falling. From 2012 onward, she has appeared in films such as 12 Rounds 3: Lockdown and Honor Society, and in television programs such as R.L. Stine's The Haunting Hour, Van Helsing, and The Good Doctor. She is most notably known for her breakout role as Sara in the MGM+ horror television series, From.

== Personal life ==
Konrad is openly gay. She is reportedly close friends with her setmate, Chloe Van Landschoot, from the TV series From and short film Tidal. Konrad stated in an interview, that she loved filming with her.

== Filmography ==
=== Film ===
Year	Title	Role	Notes
2008	Skies Falling	Hallie's friend	Short film
2012	Rock and Roll	Abigail	Short film
2013	Heart of Dance	Michelle	Film
2015	12 Rounds 3: Lockdown	Girlfriend	Film
2015	No One Would Tell	Kara Lovett	TV Movie
2020	Alive	unknown	Short film
2020	Broil	Chance Sinclair	Film
2022	Tidal	Wife	Short film
2022	Honor Society	Emma	Film

=== Television ===
Year	Title	Role	Notes
2012	R.L. Stine's The Haunting Hour	Gina Sarland as the Witch	1 episode (season 1)
2013	Falling Skies	Rita	1 episode (season 1)
2014	The Killing	Phoebe Stansbury	Recurring role (3 episodes, season 4)
2016	Van Helsing	Cynthia	Recurring role (3 episodes, season 1)
2019	Unspeakable	Kendra Bowen	1 episode (season 1)
2020	The Good Doctor	Tamara Krantz	2 episodes (season 3)
2020	Sacred Lies	Roan Harper	Recurring role (7 episodes, season 2)
2022-present	From	Sara Myers	Main role (30 episodes, seasons 1-present)
