= The Drawer Boy =

Play by Michael Healey

The Drawer Boy is a play by Michael Healey. It is a two-act play set in 1972 on a farm near Clinton, Ontario. There are only three characters: the farm's two owners, Morgan and Angus, and Miles Potter, a young actor from Toronto doing research for a collectively created theatre piece about farming.

The Drawer Boy premiered at Theatre Passe Muraille in 1999, starring Tom Barnett, David Fox and Jerry Franken. It is the winner of the 1999 Governor General’s Literary Award for English-language drama and was published in 1999 by Playwrights Canada Press.

== Plot ==
The Drawer Boy replays the adventures of a young actor from a Toronto theatre group who visits the rural Ontario home of two elderly bachelor farmers to "research" farm life for a new play. In doing so, he demonstrates the way in which a collective creation appropriated the lives of its subjects and changed their own interpretation of it. The two farmers, Morgan and Angus, have achieved a precarious balance in their lives together. Morgan, a tough-minded, stubborn man, cares for Angus, who has had brain damage and lost his memory during the bombing of London in the Second World War. Angus is initially identified as "the drawer boy" because he used to design buildings and has the talents of an architect. Morgan calms and reassures Angus by retelling their story - of the two tall women whom they loved, and who came to live with them in Canada. The young actor, Miles, learns, however, that this story is a fiction and that the truth is much sadder. It would, in fact, destroy their friendship. In the process of telling their story as play, however, he reawakens Angus's memory. Art becomes life. Miles is in effect the "drawer boy," delineating and creating an alternative reality. As he tells Morgan, "We're here to get your history and give it back to you." The Drawer Boy is fundamentally about the power of storytelling in creating and interpreting reality and how it can transform lives. There is much more in the play than a history of Canadian drama.

The Drawer Boy premiered in Toronto at Theatre Passe Muraille in 1999 and was subsequently produced by Ed Mirvish Productions at the more opulent Winter Garden Theatre in Toronto and the Manitoba Theatre Centre, Winnipeg in 2001. The 2001/02 revival was a collaboration between the National Arts Centre in Ottawa and has toured to the major regional theatres: Hamilton's Theatre Aquarius, Edmonton's Citadel Theatre, and the Vancouver Playhouse. It has won the Dora Mavor Moore Award for Outstanding New Play, a Chalmers Award, and a Governor General's Award.

The Drawer Boy received its London premiere at Finborough Theatre on 19 June 2012, with John Bett, Neil McCaul and Simon Lee Phillips, directed by Eleanor Rhode. The revival was produced by London theatre company Snapdragon Productions.

== Basis ==
The Drawer Boy (1999) by Michael Healey revisits the origins of an alternative Canadian theatre - the collective creation of The Farm Show in 1972 by Theatre Passe Muraille. As the National Arts Centre programme for The Drawer Boy explains:

"In the 1970s a group of actors, including The Drawer Boy's director, Miles Potter and actor David Fox, who plays Angus in The Drawer Boy, working with Paul Thompson, the Artistic Director of Passe Muraille, headed into the rural heartland of southern Ontario and, after interviewing local farmers and their families, created a landmark Canadian theatrical event: The Farm Show. Almost two and a half decades later, Michael Healey went to work as an actor at the Blyth Festival and came into contact with many of the farmers and members of the local community whose stories had served as inspiration for The Farm Show. The longevity of the impact of that experience, in turn, inspired the playwright to write his tribute to the power of art, The Drawer Boy."

== Awards ==
The Drawer Boy won the 1999 Governor General’s Literary Award for English-language drama.

== Reviews ==
Joel Greenberg states in his theatre review for Aisle Say, "Thirty years ago, when The Farm Show was first created - it is the inspiration for Healey's play - no one in the local theatre community would have guessed that such movement was possible. That was a time when the 'underground' and the 'mainstream' were separated by a gulf too wide to consider negotiable. Happily, time has provided a bridge that makes such distinctions increasingly irrelevant." Canadian novelist and poet Michael Ondaatje believes that "it is one of the few plays to create an authentic tradition in our culture," and former Globe and Mail critic Kate Taylor states that it "is fast turning into a Canadian classic."

The London premiere of the play, presented by Snapdragon Productions at the Finborough Theatre, was praised by the critics. The Guardian called the play "a landmark in Canadian theatre", and The Stage praised the play as a "modern classic in the making". In her five-star review for WhatsOnStage.com, Amy Stow praised the production as "delicately and sympathetically approached by director Eleanor Rhode, who skilfully draws out the humour within each relationship, and creates an immersive world which the audience can simply sink into."

== Film adaptation ==
Arturo Pérez Torres and Aviva Armour-Ostroff directed the 2017 film adaption The Drawer Boy. The film was shot in Ontario, starring Stuart Hughes as Angus, Richard Clarkin as Morgan, and Jakob Ehman as Miles. It won best feature at several festivals including the Canadian Film Festival, the Heartland Film Festival and the Anchorage International Film Festival. The film was released in theaters and on Video on Demand in November 2018 by the streaming media service HighballTV.
