= Ricky He =

Canadian actor (born 1995)

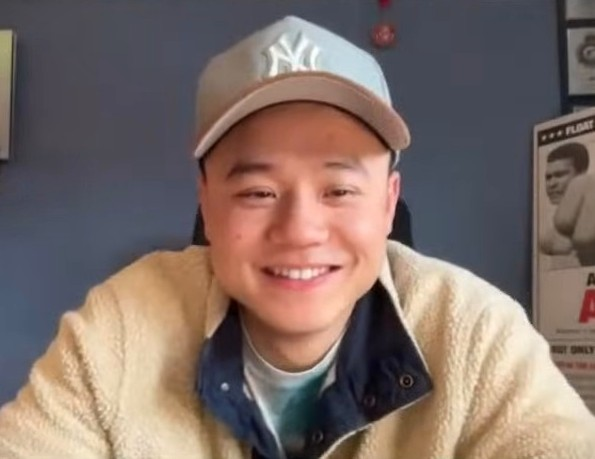
- He in 2024
- Born: December 2, 1995 (age 30)
- Education: University of British Columbia
- Occupation: Actor
- Years active: 2016–present
- Height: 5 ft 10 in (178 cm)

Ricky He (December 2, 1995) is a Canadian actor. He is known for his role as Kenny Liu in the MGM+ horror series From.

== Early life ==
Ricky He was born in Vancouver, British Columbia. After studying psychology for three years at UBC, He left university to pursue a career in acting.

== Career ==
On television, He has appeared on The CW's The Flash, Fox's Wayward Pines, Freeform's Beyond, CBC's The Romeo Section, NBC's Trial & Error, ABC’s The Good Doctor and Syfy's The Magicians. He has also appeared in the television films Christmas Solo (2017), A Gift to Remember (2017), Looks like Christmas (2016), and Blurt (2018).

== Filmography ==
=== Film ===
Year	Title	Role	Notes
2014	Scene Study	Student	Short film
2019	Grandma's 80th Birthday	Ryan	Short film
2020	A Babysitter's Guide to Monster Hunting	Jespar Huang	
2021	A Cinderella Story: Starstruck	Kenny	Direct-to-video
2025	Worth the Wait	Blake	
2026	Rock Springs	TBA	

=== Television ===
Year	Title	Role	Notes
2016	Second Chance	Chinese Teen Boy	Episode: "When You Have to Go There, They Have to Take You In"
2016	The Flash	Patron #1	Episode: "Trajectory"
2016	Wayward Pines	Puking Resident	Episode: "City Upon a Hill"
2016	Looks Like Christmas	Pizza Delivery Guy	Television film
2016	The Romeo Section	PA #2	Episode: "Final Measures"
2017	The Magicians	First Year Student	Episodes: "Hotel Spa Potions", "First Year Student"
2017	A Gift to Remember	Josh	Television film
2017	Christmas Solo	Henry	Television film
2018	Blurt	Chess Club President	Television film
2018	Beyond	Orderly #2	Episode: "I Scream, You Scream"
2018	Trial & Error	Tyler	Recurring role, 5 episodes
2018	Freaky Friday	Adam	Disney Channel Original Movie
2018	No One Would Tell	Gus	Television film
2018–2020	The Good Doctor	Kellan Park	6 episodes
2018	A Million Little Things	Don	Episode: "Band of Dads"
2018	Arrow	Tony	Episode: "Inmate 4587"
2021	Warming up to You	Matt	Television film
2022–present	From	Kenny Liu	Main role

Ricky He video game roles
Year	Title	Role	Notes
2021	Immortals Fenyx Rising: Myths of the Eastern Realm	Ku	

== Awards and nominations ==
Year	Award	Category	Nominated work	Result	Ref
2018	Leo Awards	Best Supporting Performance by a Male in a Television Movie	Christmas Solo	Nominated	
2018	UBCP/ACTRA Awards, Vancouver	Best Emerging Performer	A Song for Christmas	Nominated	
2019	Leo Awards	Best Guest Performance by a Male in a Dramatic Series	The Good Doctor (for "Quarantine: Part 1")	Nominated	
2023	Leo Awards	Best Supporting Performance by a Male in a Dramatic Series	From	Won	
