= Michael Healey =

Canadian playwright and actor

Michael Healey is a Canadian playwright and actor.

== Life and career ==
He graduated from the acting programme at Toronto's Ryerson Theatre School in 1985.

Healey trained as an actor at Toronto's Ryerson Theatre School in the mid-eighties. He began writing for the stage in the early nineties and his first play, a solo one-act called Kicked, was produced at the Fringe of Toronto Festival in 1996. He subsequently toured the play across Canada and Australia, and in 1998 it won a Dora Mavor Moore Award for Best New Original Play (Independent Theatre).

The Drawer Boy, his first full-length play, premiered in Toronto in 1999 and won the Dora Mavor Moore Award for Best New Play, a Floyd S. Chalmers Canadian Play Award, and the Governor General's Award for English-language drama. It has been produced across North America and internationally, and has been translated into German, French, and Japanese. It was adapted into a film in 2017.

His other plays include The Road to Hell (co-authored with Kate Lynch), Plan B, Rune Arlidge, The Innocent Eye Test, The Nuttals, and Are You Okay? From 2008 to 2012 he created a trilogy of plays about Canadian values and politics, entitled Generous, Courageous, and Proud. His plays have won the Dora Mavor Moore Award for Best New Original Play (General Theatre) five times in total.

He has also adapted works by George Bernard Shaw, Anton Chekhov, Ferenc Molnár, Friedrich Dürrenmatt, and Ben Hecht and Charles MacArthur.

Michael Healey has several TV acting credits, including a regular role as lawyer James Ryder on the CBC comedy-drama This Is Wonderland. His stage acting credits include the plays of Jason Sherman (The League of Nathans, Reading Hebron, and Three in the Back, Two in the Head) and George F. Walker (The End of Civilization and Better Living).

== Plays ==
- 1996: Kicked
- 1999: The Road to Hell: Two One-Act Comedies, with Kate Lynch
- 1999: The Drawer Boy
- 2002: Plan B
- 2004: Rune Arlidge
- 2006: The Innocent Eye Test
- 2007: Generous
- 2010: Courageous
- 2011: The Nuttalls
- 2011: Are You Okay?
- 2012: Proud
- 2017: 1979
- 2023: The Master Plan
- 2025: Rogers v. Rogers

== Awards ==
Year	Nominated work	Award	Category	Result	Ref.
1998	Kicked	Dora Mavor Moore Awards	Best Original Play (Independent Theatre)	Won	
1999	The Drawer Boy	Dora Mavor Moore Awards	Best Original Play (General Theatre)	Won	
1999	The Drawer Boy	Governor General's Awards	English-language drama	Won	
2000	The Drawer Boy	Floyd S. Chalmers Canadian Play Award		Won	
2002	Plan B	Dora Mavor Moore Awards	Best Original Play (General Theatre)	Won	
2004	Rune Arlidge	Governor General's Awards	English-language drama	Nominated	
2007	Generous	Dora Mavor Moore Awards	Best Original Play (General Theatre)	Won	
2010	Courageous	Dora Mavor Moore Awards	Best Original Play (General Theatre)	Won	
2010	Courageous	Governor General's Awards	English-language drama	Nominated	
2017	1979	Governor General's Awards	English-language drama	Nominated	
2024	The Master Plan	Dora Mavor Moore Awards	Best Production (General Theatre)	Nominated	
2024	The Master Plan	Dora Mavor Moore Awards	Best Original Play (General Theatre)	Won	
2026	Rogers v. Rogers	Dora Mavor Moore Awards	Best Original Play (General Theatre)	Nominated	
