= Chloe Van Landschoot =

Canadian actress and director (born 1993)

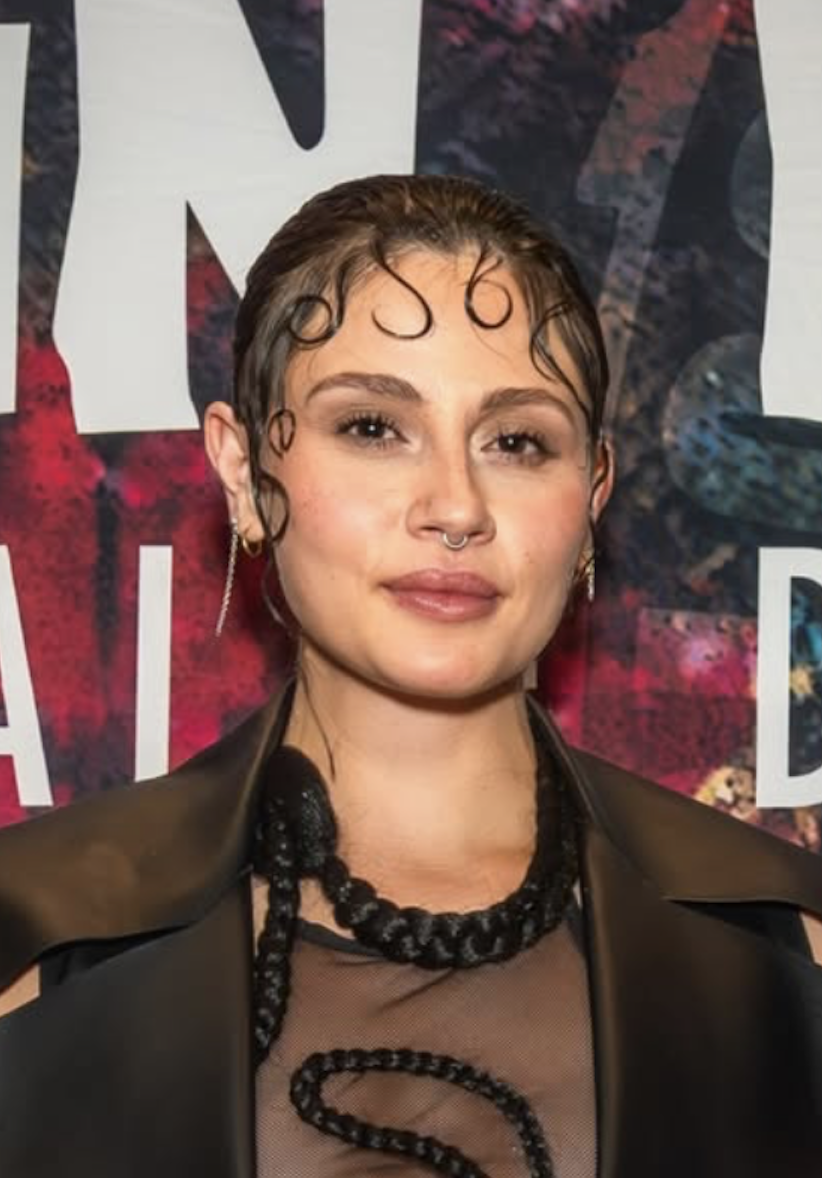
- Van Landschoot in 2025
- Born: September 9, 1997 (age 29); Hamilton, Ontario, Canada
- Occupations: Actress, director, writer, dancer, nurse
- Years active: 2013–present

Chloe Van Landschoot (born September 9, 1997, in Hamilton, Ontario), is a Canadian actress, director, writer, dancer, and nurse.

Van Landschoot began her career as a model and also worked as a nurse before attracting notice for portraying Kristi Miller, a third year medical student, in the MGM+ science fiction horror television series From (2022–present).

After a series of small roles in various films, she starred as the lead role of Sara in the horror film Son of Sara: Volume 1 (2026).

== Early life ==
Born in Grimsby, Ontario in 1997, her family is of Belgian descent. She has since settled in Toronto, where she studied nursing before entering show business.

== Career ==
Van Landschoot first began dabbling in commercial modelling and dance when she was 13. While pursuing a career in show business, Van Lanschoot also worked as a nurse in an emergency room in Toronto. In a 2023 interview, she said:

I knew deep down that doing both was possible. Doing both was what made me the type of artist that I am...

Van Landschoot began her acting career with small roles in films such as the 2013 Carrie remake, the television film Chris Watts: Confessions of a Killer (2020), and the independent film Lune (2021).

Van Landschoot experienced a career breakthrough when she was cast as Kristi Miller, a bisexual third year medical student, in the MGM+ science fiction horror television series From. Van Landschoot was working full-time as a nurse in Toronto during the height of the COVID-19 pandemic before she was cast on the series in 2021.

Deadline announced that she was cast in July 2021, and the first season of the series was released globally in 2022. The second season of From premiered on April 23, 2023. The third season of From premiered on September 22, 2024. The fourth season of From premiered on April 19, 2026.

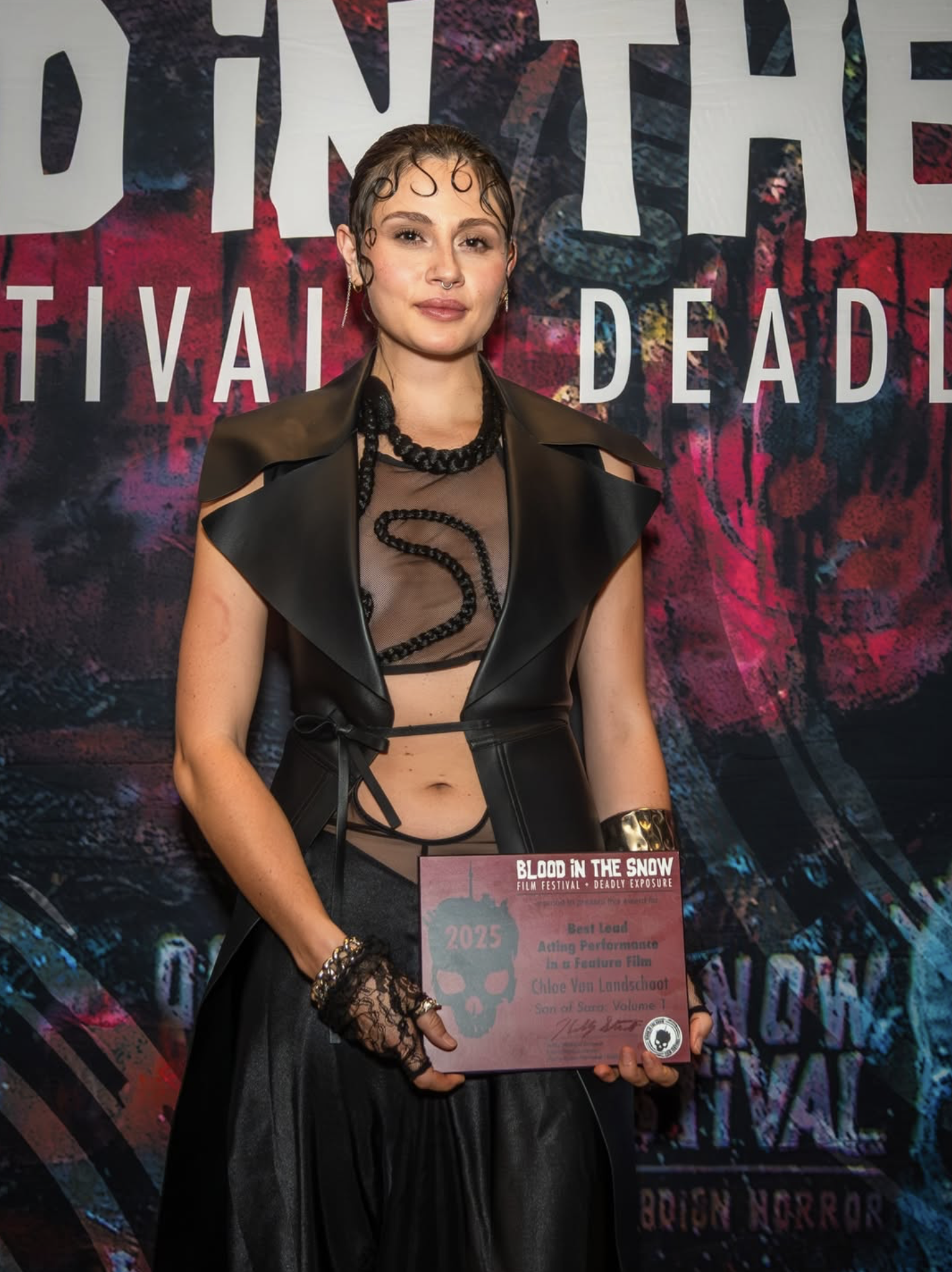
Van Landschoot at the 2025 edition of Blood in the Snow in Toronto

Van Landschoot plays the lead role of Sara in the horror film Son of Sara: Volume 1. The film, directed by Houston Bone, opened Blood in the Snow on November 17, 2025. At Blood in the Snow, Van Landschoot won the award for Best Lead Acting Performance in a Feature Film. She subsequently won the award for Best Actress at the 2026 edition of the Black Sunday Film Festival in the UK.

=== Other work ===
Van Landschoot has also worked on short films throughout her career. In 2022, she wrote, produced, and directed her own short film, which she also starred in, called Tidal. The film, which features Van Landschoot performing as a dancer, deals with her experience working as a nurse during the COVID-19 pandemic and the effects that experience had on her own mental health. Tidal won the award for Best International Short Film at the 2023 Manchester Film Festival.

In 2025, Van Landschoot starred in the short horror film Heirlooms, directed by Dan Abramovici, which premiered at the 29th Fantasia International Film Festival.

== Filmography ==
=== Film ===
Year	Title	Role	Notes
2013	Carrie	Flower girl	
2015	Jackie Boy	Sasha	
2020	Chris Watts: Confessions of a Killer	Nicole Kessinger	Television film
2020	Barbital	Micah	Short film
2020	Liminal	Dancer	Short film
2021	Lune	Eliza	
2022	Tidal	Nurse	Short film; directorial debut
2025	Heirlooms	Jamie	Short film
2025	Son of Sara: Volume 1	Sara	Lead role

=== Television ===
Year	Title	Role	Notes
2022–present	From	Kristi Miller	Main role; 30 episodes

== Accolades ==
Year	Association	Category	Nominated work	Result	Refs
2025	Blood in the Snow Film Festival ("Bloodies")	Best Lead Acting Performance in a Feature Film	Son of Sara: Volume 1	Won	
2026	Black Sunday Film Festival	Best Actress	Son of Sara: Volume 1	Won	
