= Hannah Cheramy =

Canadian actress

- Born: July 13, 2003 (age 23); Vancouver, Canada
- Education: University of Michigan (BFA)
- Occupation: Actress
- Years active: 2010–present
- Television: From

Hannah Cheramy (born July 13, 2003) is a Canadian actor. She rose to prominence for her portrayal of Julie Matthews in the MGM+ television series From.

== Early life ==
Cheramy was born on July 13, 2003, in Vancouver, British Columbia, Canada, to Louis and Terry Cheramy and was raised as an only child. She began her acting career at the age of 7 in 2010, participating in local children’s theatre productions and later appearing in commercials and television projects. Despite her early start in the industry, Cheramy continued her education and graduated from Burnaby North Secondary School before studying theatre at the University of Michigan, where she earned a Bachelor of Fine Arts degree.

== Career ==
Cheramy's breakthrough role came when she played Julie Matthews in the Epix horror series From, which premiered in 2022. The series follows a group of strangers who find themselves trapped in a mysterious town surrounded by a supernatural forest. For this role, she was nominated for the 2025 Saturn Award in the category “Best Performance by a Younger Actor in a Television Series.”

== Filmography ==
=== Film ===
Year	Title	Role	Notes
2015	October Kiss	Zoe Larson	Television film
2016	Colossal	Young Gloria	
2016	Summer Love	Addison Sulliway	Television film
2017	Escape from Mr. Lemoncello's Library	Rose Vermette	Television film
2017	The Hollow Child	Olivia	
2021	Under Wraps	Ghoul Girl	

=== Television ===
Year	Title	Role	Notes
2016–2017	Van Helsing	Dylan	4 episodes
2022–present	From	Julie Matthews	Main role
