= Colossal (film) =

2016 film by Nacho Vigalondo

- Theatrical release poster
- Directed by: Nacho Vigalondo
- Written by: Nacho Vigalondo
- Produced by: Nahikari Ipiña; Russell Levine; Nicolas Chartier; Zev Foreman; Dominic Rustam
- Starring: Anne Hathaway; Jason Sudeikis; Dan Stevens; Austin Stowell; Tim Blake Nelson
- Cinematography: Eric Kress
- Edited by: Ben Baudhuin; Luke Doolan
- Music by: Bear McCreary
- Production companies: Voltage Pictures; Route One Entertainment; Legion M; Union Investment Partners; Sayaka Producciones; Brightlight Pictures
- Distributed by: Neon (United States); Mongrel Media (Canada); Versus Entertainment (Spain); Dreamfact Entertainment (South Korea)
- Release dates: September 9, 2016 (TIFF); April 7, 2017 (United States); April 20, 2017 (South Korea); April 21, 2017 (Canada); June 29, 2017 (Spain)
- Running time: 110 minutes
- Countries: Canada; Spain; United States; South Korea
- Language: English
- Budget: $15 million
- Box office: $4.5 million

Colossal is a 2016 black comedy monster film directed and written by Nacho Vigalondo. The film stars Anne Hathaway, Jason Sudeikis, Dan Stevens, Austin Stowell, and Tim Blake Nelson. The film follows an unemployed writer who unwittingly manifests a giant reptilian creature in Seoul while struggling with alcoholism and a misanthropic colleague.

The film was an international co-production between producers in Canada, Spain, the United States, and South Korea. Anne Hathaway signed on to the project in May 2015, which was described as "Godzilla meets Lost in Translation". Prior to the start of filming, Toho brought a lawsuit against Voltage Pictures, the film's producers, for unauthorized usage of Godzilla's image. However, a settlement was reached in October 2015. Principal photography began on October 18, 2015, and primarily took place in and around Vancouver, British Columbia, finishing on November 25, 2015.

Colossal held its world premiere at the Toronto International Film Festival on 9 September 2016 and was followed by several festival screenings. It was theatrically released in the United States on April 7, 2017 by Neon, in South Korea on April 20 by Dreamfact Entertainment, in Canada on April 21 by Mongrel Media, and in Spain on June 30 by Versus Entertainment; it aired a day earlier, on June 29, on Movistar Estrenos as an exclusive preview. The film received positive reviews, with praise for the acting, direction, screenplay, and themes. Hathaway and Sudeikis were singled out by many critics for particular acclaim. The film grossed $4.5 million worldwide against a production budget of $15 million.

== Plot ==
Gloria is an unemployed writer struggling with alcoholism. Her boyfriend Tim, frustrated with her behavior, breaks up with her and kicks her out of their New York City apartment. Moving back to her family home in Mainhead, New Hampshire, Gloria reunites with her childhood friend Oscar, who now runs his late father's bar. Oscar warmly welcomes Gloria and offers her a job at the bar, which she accepts.

Working at the bar aggravates Gloria's alcoholism; she often drinks with Oscar and his friends, Garth and Joel, until morning, then sleeps it off in her nearly empty childhood home. At the same time, a giant reptilian monster appears in Seoul, leaving death and destruction in its wake. Gloria realizes that when she walks through a local playground at exactly 8:05 am, she causes the monster to manifest and can remotely control it.

Gloria shares her discovery with Oscar and his friends by dancing in the playground while they watch a newsfeed of the monster mimicking her movements. A helicopter launches a missile at the monster, causing Gloria pain. Gloria lashes out, destroying the helicopter, and killing the pilots. Horrified at what she has done, she collapses, causing widespread destruction. She awakens to find that a delighted Oscar also manifested in Seoul, but as a giant robot. Gloria tries to make amends by having the monster spell out an apology in Korean, to the delight of the South Korean people and media, and begins avoiding both the playground and alcohol.

After spending the night with Joel, Gloria discovers a drunken Oscar controlling the robot to taunt South Korea. After a tense confrontation, she makes him leave. Oscar thinks something happened between Gloria and Joel, becoming jealous. That night, he drunkenly insults his friends at the bar and demands Gloria have a beer, threatening to return to the playground if she refuses. The next morning, a sober Oscar apologizes to Gloria.

Tim pays a visit to Gloria but is irritated by her living situation before apologizing. Upon meeting Tim at the bar, Oscar provokes a confrontation by setting off a giant firework indoors. Tim tries to get Gloria to leave with him, but she stays to curb Oscar's destructive behavior. Oscar visits Gloria's house to prevent her from leaving, and Gloria recalls their childhood; as a child, Gloria made a paper diorama of Seoul as a school project, which was blown into what would later become the playground; a young Oscar retrieved it but destroyed it out of jealousy. Gloria's anger triggered lightning which strikes both of them, as well as their toys—Gloria's being a reptilian monster, and Oscar's being a robot.

In the present, Gloria recognizes that Oscar's manipulative behavior arises from his self-hatred at never having amounted to anything; the robot manifests as his way of making himself feel important. After deciding to leave town, Gloria races Oscar for the playground. Oscar incapacitates her and destroys a large portion of Seoul, killing hundreds of people. Oscar warns Gloria that for every day she is not with him, he will commit further rampages.

Shortly afterward, Gloria makes a trip to South Korea, apologizing to Tim over the phone, but says she owes him no explanations as he had ended their relationship. At 8:05 am in his time zone, Oscar carries out his threat, manifesting his robot in Seoul. Gloria walks toward it in Seoul, making her monster appear at the playground back home. Gloria's monster catches Oscar and flings him over the horizon, causing the robot and her monster to disappear. Gloria retreats to a bar and asks the bartender if she would like to hear an amazing story. The bartender says yes, and offers Gloria a drink, at which Gloria sighs.

== Cast ==
- Anne Hathaway as Gloria, a struggling article writer
  - Hannah Cheramy as young Gloria
- Jason Sudeikis as Oscar, Gloria's misanthropic childhood friend who is the proprietor of a bar he inherited from his father
  - Nathan Ellison as young Oscar
- Dan Stevens as Tim, Gloria's ex-boyfriend
- Austin Stowell as Joel, a friend of Oscar who takes a liking to Gloria
- Tim Blake Nelson as Garth, a friend of Oscar who is known for his babbling
- Rukiya Bernard as Marie, one of Gloria's New York friends
- Agamdeep Darshi as Ash, one of Gloria's New York friends

== Production ==
Hathaway was the first actress to sign on at a time when the project had no financial backing. Hathaway heard about the script after finding herself "in a little bit of an artistic no man's land" for inspiration. Director Jonathan Demme screened for her a copy of A Field in England, after which Hathaway decided that it represented exactly the type of movie she wanted to make. After asking her representation to see a similar script that she could join, she was sent the Colossal script. Hathaway found herself attracted to the genre-hopping nature of the script, later comparing it to Being John Malkovich, one of her favorite films.

Prior to the start of filming, Japanese company Toho brought a lawsuit against Voltage Pictures for unauthorized usage of Godzilla's image and stills from previous Godzilla films in emails and press documents sent to potential investors. A settlement was reached that October.

Principal photography on the film also began in Vancouver on October 18, 2015, and ended on November 25, 2015. No motion captured footage was used for the creation of the monster; rather, footage of Hathaway acting out her parts was given to the CG team, who used this as reference points. The CG artists, as opposed to Vigalondo, were responsible for the look of the monster itself. Vigalondo stated that this was partly due to his lack of artistic skill and partly due to him "[wanting] them to feel like characters that felt like a part of the genre we're playing with".

== Release ==
The film had its world premiere at the Toronto International Film Festival on September 9, 2016. Shortly after, distribution rights to the film were acquired by an unnamed Chinese company, which was later announced as Neon, a newly founded distribution company. It held its European premiere at the San Sebastián International Film Festival on September 19, 2016. The film was selected as the closing screening for Fantastic Fest at the Alamo Drafthouse South Lamar on September 29, 2016, where it was awarded Best Picture in the Fantastic Features section. It was screened at the Sitges Film Festival on October 7, 2016. The film went on to screen at the Sundance Film Festival on January 20, 2017, and at South by Southwest on March 10, 2017. The film began a limited theatrical release in the United States on April 7, 2017. In South Korea, the film was released on April 20 by Dreamfact Entertainment. It was released in Canadian theaters the following day, on April 21, by Mongrel Media. In Spain, the film was co-distributed by Versus Entertainment and Movistar+. It premiered as an exclusive preview on June 29, 2017 on Movistar Estrenos before it was released theatrically the following day, on June 30, by Versus Entertainment.

== Reception ==
=== Box office ===
Colossal earned $3 million in the United States and Canada and $1.5 million in other territories for a total international gross of $4.5 million against a production budget of $15 million.

Colossal earned $120,226 in its opening weekend from four theaters at an average of $30,056 per theater, finishing twenty-ninth at the box office. The film grew by 278% in its second weekend, grossing $454,258 in 98 theaters and finishing in #17. In its third weekend, the film grew again by 35%. earning $615,089 in 239 theaters. By its fourth weekend, the film crossed $2 million domestically, earning $563,344 on 326 screens, averaging $1,728 per theater. The film made its international debut in South Korea on April 21, 2017, where it grossed $50,712 (₩57,518,565) in 294 theaters.

=== Critical response ===
On review aggregator website Rotten Tomatoes, the film has an approval rating of 82% based on 263 reviews, with an average rating of 7.17/10. The site's critical consensus reads, "Colossal's singular strangeness can be disorienting, but viewers who hang on may find that its genre-defying execution—and Anne Hathaway's performance—is well worth the ride." On Metacritic, the film has a score of 70 out of 100, based on 38 critics, indicating "generally favorable" reviews.

Writing for RogerEbert.com, Matt Zoller Seitz awarded Colossal 3.5 out of 4 stars, stating "I'll just say that the cast is quietly superb, that the movie always knows what it is and what it wants to say." IGN awarded it 7.0 out of 10, saying "It isn't always successful, but when the film works, it's a blast—another completely original and unique genre mash-up from the mad mind of Nacho Vigalondo." Peter Travers of Rolling Stone awarded it 3.5 out of 4, saying "Colossal is seriously unmissable".

Jake Coyle writing for the Associated Press gave it 2 out of 4 stars, saying "The one-trick act of 'Colossal' becomes tiresome even as its leads—particularly an excellent Hathaway—work to find some depth in the story." Mark Jenkins of NPR said "The longer the movie runs, the more its novelty fades. The tone wavers, and plot holes that appeared small at the halfway point start looking like chasms." Rex Reed of The New York Observer gave it 0 out of 4 stars, saying the film was "almost as unwatchable as it [sic] incomprehensible".
