= 12 Rounds 3: Lockdown =

- Theatrical release poster
- Directed by: Stephen Reynolds
- Written by: Nathan Brooks; Bobby Lee Darby
- Produced by: Michael J. Luisi
- Starring: Dean Ambrose; Roger Cross
- Cinematography: Mahlon Todd Williams
- Edited by: Sam Bauer
- Music by: Nathan Whitehead
- Production companies: WWE Studios; (Lockdown Films, Inc.)
- Distributed by: Lionsgate Films
- Release date: September 11, 2015
- Running time: 90 minutes
- Country: United States
- Language: English

12 Rounds 3: Lockdown (also known as 12 Rounds 3 or 12 Rounds: Lockdown) is a 2015 American action film directed by Stephen Reynolds. It stars Dean Ambrose in his film debut as John Shaw, a detective who is hunted by corrupt cops for the incriminating evidence he held in his hands. It is the sequel to the 2013 film 12 Rounds 2: Reloaded, the third and final installment in the 12 Rounds trilogy, and the second of six films (titled the "Action Six-Pack" series) co-produced by WWE Studios and Lionsgate, which distributed the film. It is the first film in the series not to be distributed by 20th Century Fox, and was released in select theaters across the United States and on demand on September 11, 2015.

== Plot ==
Detective Tyler Burke and his two men Gideon and Saul kill drug dealer George Freemont after destroying evidence showing Burke distributing narcotics. Meanwhile, Detective John Shaw returns to active duty at his precinct after the death of his partner, Ray Jones, in which Shaw was shot and sidelined with post traumatic stress disorder. He is met by his supervisor Captain Ellen Matthews, recent police academy graduate Officer Jenny Taylor and Burke, who is being hailed for busting Freemont.

Unknown to Burke, Freemont had made a backup into the flash drive containing the incriminating evidence, which is found during Freemont's autopsy and delivered to evidence by Taylor. Shaw reads the incident report of the Freemont bust and retrieves the flash drive from evidence. At the same time, Burke learns about the flash drive and quickly heads to the precinct.

Unable to intercept Shaw, Burke triggers the fire alarm so that everyone, except he and his fellow corrupt cops, can evacuate the building and find Shaw easily, initiates a total lockdown of the building, disabling all the phone communication, computer networks as well as jamming cell phone signals. Shaw, knowing that he is now being hunted, ambushes Burke's associate Meeks but Burke kills Meeks when Shaw uses him as a human shield. With only 12 rounds left on his gun, Shaw must elude a series of ambushes and kill the corrupt cops by alternative means.

Shaw runs into Taylor, who had been accidentally locked in, who sees Meeks' blood on Shaw and refuses to trust him, forcing him to point his gun at her. He leaves her with a warning to hide until the lockdown is over. Matthews arrives and, unaware of Burke's intention, hails Burke over walkie talkie. Burke frames Shaw for Meeks' death and assures Matthews that he will handle Shaw. Burke catches Taylor and threatens to kill her if Shaw doesn't show up. Shaw complies but Burke kills her anyway. After an ensuing gunfight that nearly kills Burke, Shaw disconnects several wires to disable the CCTV cameras and then reactivates the network in order to upload the evidence regarding Burke to Internal Affairs. However, Burke's associate Darrow notices it and deactivates the network before the upload is complete. Frustrated, Shaw goes to the rooftop to make a call to Matthews, proclaiming his innocence and reveals Burke's corruption. Darrow and Burke capture Shaw and bring him to a meeting room. Burke retrieves the flash drive from Shaw and destroys it. Just as Burke is about to shoot Shaw, the lights go off and Shaw kills Darrow and escapes.

After a brief encounter with the SWAT team, Shaw calls Matthews to meet her at the back of the building. After meeting up, Matthews reveals to be Burke's associate. Burke then shoots Matthews before the SWAT team bursts inside. As Shaw is about to be arrested, he plays a recording of Burke's earlier monologue in which Burke incriminates himself. Burke attempts to shoot Shaw but Shaw fires his last round to Burke's leg. Shaw then cuffs Burke and walks out of the building.

== Cast ==
- Dean Ambrose as Detective John Shaw
- Roger Cross as Detective Tyler Burke
- Daniel Cudmore as Gideon
- Lochlyn Munro as Darrow
- Ty Olsson as Harris
- Sarah Smyth as Officer Jenny Taylor
- Rebecca Marshall as Captain Ellen Matthews
- Kirby Morrow as Saul
- Toby Levins as Meeks
- Bill Dow as Chief Keppler
- Sharon Taylor as Carmen
- Matthew Harrison as George Freemont
- Avery Konrad as Girlfriend
- Andrew Herr as Kid

== Reception ==
Jason Best of What's on TV gave it 2 out of 5 and wrote: "Die Hard in a police station is a nifty idea but it is wasted on this by-the-numbers installment of the WWE action-movie franchise". Martin Tsai of the Los Angeles Times wrote: "Written by Bobby Lee Darby and Nathan Brookes, the new film is a sequel to 12 Rounds in name only".
