= Wetback: The Undocumented Documentary =

- Directed by: Arturo Pérez Torres
- Written by: Arturo Perez Torres
- Produced by: Heather Haynes
- Cinematography: Felipe Rodriguez
- Edited by: Julia Blua
- Music by: Roko Citroen
- Distributed by: Ironweed film club
- Release date: 2005
- Running time: 97 minutes
- Country: Canada
- Languages: English; Spanish

Wetback: The Undocumented Documentary is a 2005 Canadian documentary film, funded by the Canada Council for the Arts and written and directed by Arturo Pérez Torres.

It was released by the independent studio Open City Works and distributed by the Ironweed film club.

The filmmakers follow Nayo and Milton (whose surnames are not given), migrants from Chinandega, Nicaragua as they cross through Honduras, El Salvador, Guatemala, Mexico, and the United States in their attempt to reach Canada. Along the way, other migrants are interviewed as they are detained by Mexican authorities. Catholic human rights workers in Chiapas also offer their perspectives, particularly on the abuse of migrants by gangs such as the Mara Salvatrucha.

It also features interviews with United States Border Patrol agents and Arizona Minuteman Project organizer Chris Simcox.

== Awards ==
The film was screened at the Cinequest Film Festival, where it won the prize for best documentary, at Hot Docs. At the Oxnard Film Festival, it also received the audience award.

== See also ==
- El Norte
