= The Drawer Boy (film) =

- Directed by: Arturo Pérez Torres; Aviva Armour-Ostroff
- Written by: Arturo Pérez Torres
- Based on: The Drawer Boy by Michael Healey
- Produced by: Arturo Pérez Torres; Aviva Armour-Ostroff
- Starring: Jakob Ehman; Richard Clarkin; Stuart Hughes
- Cinematography: Cabot McNenly
- Music by: Bob Wiseman
- Release date: July 1, 2017
- Running time: 98 minutes
- Country: Canada
- Language: English

The Drawer Boy is a Canadian drama film, which was directed by Arturo Pérez Torres and Aviva Armour-Ostroff, and released in 2017. An adaptation of Michael Healey's play The Drawer Boy, the film stars Jakob Ehman as Miles, a young actor who takes a job as a labourer on a farm owned by lifelong friends Morgan (Richard Clarkin) and Angus (Stuart Hughes), but finds that his presence has a destabilizing effect on the men's friendship.

The film premiered at the Heartland Film Festival in 2017, and had its Canadian premiere at the Canadian Film Festival in 2018. At the Canadian Film Festival, it won the award for Best Feature Film.

At the 7th Canadian Screen Awards in 2019, the film received nominations for Best Supporting Actor (Clarkin) and Best Screenplay (Pérez Torres). Clarkin won the award for Best Supporting Actor.
