= Pegah Ghafoori =

Iranian-Canadian actress

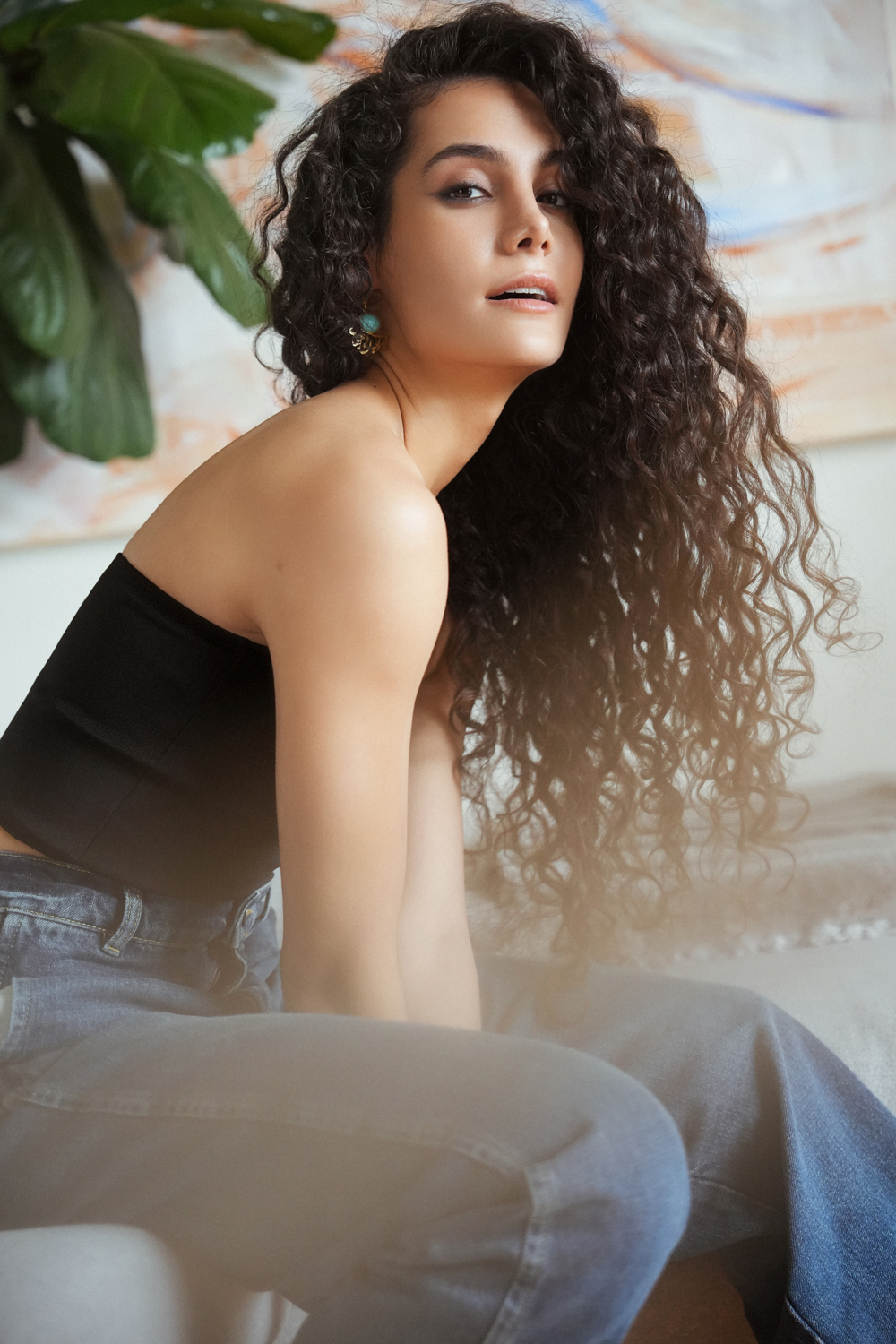
- Ghafoori in 2023
- Born: April 18, 1999 (age 27); Tehran, Iran
- Education: Claude Watson School for the Arts; Humber College
- Occupation: Actress
- Years active: 2018–present
- Known for: Fatima in From; Sahar in One Must Wash Eyes

Pegah Ghafoori (April 18, 1999) is an Iranian-Canadian actress. She is known for portraying Fatima Hassan in the MGM+ science-fiction horror television series From. She has also appeared in films such as Hello Au Revoir and One Must Wash Eyes.

== Early life and education ==
Ghafoori was born on April 18, 1999, in Tehran, Iran. She later moved to Toronto, Canada with her family in 2009. She attended high school at the Claude Watson School for the Arts to study performance.

In 2020, Ghafoori graduated from Humber College with honors, where she studied Emergency Telecommunication and Emergency Dispatching.

== Career ==
=== Early work ===
Ghafoori began her film career in 2018 with her role in the short film Brave Kids Run. Over the following years, she appeared in other short films such as SmokeBreak, Stealing from Stoners, and Red Secret. In 2021, she made her feature-film debut in Hello Au Revoir. The same year, she appeared in the television film The Perfect Wedding.

=== From ===
In 2022, Ghafoori began portraying Fatima Hassan in the MGM+ science-fiction horror series From. The role became her best-known television work. Fatima is a resident of the town in which the series is set and is involved in several of the show's major storylines, including her relationship with Ellis Stevens and the series' evolving supernatural mysteries. Ghafoori has appeared in each season of the series. The character's storyline became increasingly prominent in the later seasons, including a major transformation in the fourth-season finale.

=== One Must Wash Eyes ===
In 2024, Ghafoori appeared in the film One Must Wash Eyes as Sahar, an Iranian international student who is photographed at a Women, Life, Freedom rally in Vancouver. The film explores the connection between the Iranian diaspora in Canada and the protests that followed the death of Mahsa Amini in Iran.

Ghafoori won Best Actress at the Luleå International Film Festival for her performance in One Must Wash Eyes. She was also nominated for Best Actress at the Beaufort International Film Festival and for Outstanding Performance at the 23rd ACTRA Awards in Toronto.

== Filmography ==
=== Film ===
Year	Title	Role
2018	Brave Kids Run	Kai
2019	Stealing from Stoners	Tina
2020	Ninti	Ninti (voice)
2021	Hello Au Revoir	
2021	Red Secret	Kat
2023	SmokeBreak	Emilia
2024	One Must Wash Eyes	Sahar

=== Television ===
Year	Title	Role
2021	The Perfect Wedding	News Reporter
2022–present	From	Fatima Hassan
