= From (TV series) =

2022 American horror television series

- Title card
- Genre: Science fiction; Horror; Mystery
- Created by: John Griffin
- Starring: Harold Perrineau; Catalina Sandino Moreno; Eion Bailey; David Alpay; Elizabeth Saunders; Shaun Majumder; Scott McCord; Ricky He; Chloe Van Landschoot; Pegah Ghafoori; Corteon Moore; Hannah Cheramy; Simon Webster; Avery Konrad; Paul Zinno; Elizabeth Moy; Deborah Grover; Angela Moore; Kaelen Ohm; A.J. Simmons; Nathan D. Simmons; Robert Joy; Samantha Brown; Julia Doyle
- Opening theme: "Que Sera, Sera (Whatever Will Be, Will Be)" by Pixies
- Composer: Chris Tilton
- Country of origin: United States
- Original language: English
- No. of seasons: 4
- No. of episodes: 40 (list of episodes)

Production
- Executive producers: Rola Bauer; Lindsay Dunn; Michael Wright; Nancy Cotton; Anthony and Joe Russo; Mike Larocca; Jack Bender; John Griffin; Jeff Pinkner; Josh Appelbaum; André Nemec; Scott Rosenberg; Harold Perrineau
- Producer: Michael Mahoney
- Production locations: Nova Scotia, Canada
- Cinematography: David Greene; Christopher Ball; Michael Wale
- Editors: Wendy Hallam Martin; Ana Yavari; Dan Briceno; Stephen Lawrence; Michele Conroy; Maxyme Tremblay
- Running time: 46–60 minutes
- Production companies: Midnight Radio; Gozie AGBO; MGM Television; MGM+ Studios

Original release
- Network: Epix
- Release: February 20 – April 10, 2022
- Network: MGM+
- Release: April 23, 2023 – present

From (stylized as FROM) is an American science fiction horror television series created by John Griffin. The first season premiered on February 20, 2022, on Epix. From the second season onward, the series was released on the rebranded MGM+. The series stars Harold Perrineau, Catalina Sandino Moreno, Eion Bailey, David Alpay, Elizabeth Saunders, Scott McCord, Ricky He, and Chloe Van Landschoot in main roles.

The series has received critical acclaim for its story, directing, and the performances of the cast (particularly Perrineau), and won the Saturn Award for Best Horror Television Series at the 52nd Saturn Awards. In April 2026, the series was renewed for a fifth and final season.

== Premise ==
The series is set in a nightmarish town in the United States that traps those who enter. The unwilling residents strive to remain alive while plagued by terrifying nocturnal creatures from the surrounding forest, as they search for secrets hidden within the town and beyond in the hope of finding a way out.

The series centers on Boyd Stevens, the self-appointed sheriff and de facto mayor, and the Matthews family, new arrivals who discover they are trapped.

== Cast and characters ==
=== Main ===
- Harold Perrineau as Boyd Stevens, the self-appointed sheriff and de facto mayor of the Township. He is a retired US Army veteran who served in Afghanistan and Iraq. Boyd is estranged from his son, Ellis, after killing his wife, Abby, who had a sudden mental breakdown and inexplicably killed a number of the townspeople.
- Catalina Sandino Moreno as Tabitha Matthews, Jim's wife and Julie and Ethan's mother, who together are new arrivals to the town. She chooses to live in the Township with her husband and son while still mourning the recent loss of her youngest child, Thomas. At the end of the third season, she is revealed to be a reincarnation of Miranda Kavanaugh.
  - Vivian Crooks portrays young Tabitha (guest seasons 3–4)
  - Sarah Booth as Miranda Kavanaugh (guest seasons 2–4), Tabitha's previous incarnation, who was Victor and Eloise's mother and Henry's wife, and was killed during Victor's childhood by the creatures
- Eion Bailey as Jim Matthews (seasons 1–3; (Note: Bailey is credited as a series regular from 1x01 through 3x10.) guest season 4), Tabitha's husband and Julie and Ethan's father, who lives in the Township with his wife and children. He works with Jade to find a way to escape the town and contact the outside world.
- David Alpay as Jade Herrera, a wealthy software developer who arrives at the town on the same day as the Matthews family. Despite his intelligence, he is initially arrogant and abrasive to the Township residents and struggles with his new circumstances. At the end of the third season, he is revealed to be a reincarnation of Christopher. During the fourth season, Jade learns that all of his past incarnations were killed by the townspeople after discovering who he really was and blaming him.
  - Viggo Hanvelt portrays young Jade (guest season 4)
  - Thom Payne as Christopher (guest seasons 2–4), Jade's previous incarnation, who was a ventriloquist and resident of the Township during Victor's childhood
  - Dylan Bailey (guest seasons 1 and 4) and André Pettigrew (guest seasons 1 and 4) as previous incarnations of Jade and Christopher
- Elizabeth Saunders as Donna Raines, the leader of the residents at Colony House, who live separately from the Township
- Shaun Majumder as Father Rudra Khatri (season 1; (Note: Majumder is credited as a series regular from 1x01 through 1x08.) guest seasons 2–4), the Township's Christian priest and voice of reason in the community. Following his death, he continues to appear before Boyd as a hallucination.
- Scott McCord as Victor Kavanaugh, a peculiar Colony House resident trapped in the town since he was a child
  - Eli Arsenault portrays young Victor (guest seasons 1–3)
- Ricky He as Kenny Liu, Boyd's deputy and right-hand man, who lives with his aging parents in the Township
- Chloe Van Landschoot as Kristi Miller, the Township's doctor and a former medical student who was separated from her fiancée when she became trapped in the town
- Pegah Ghafoori as Fatima Hassan, Ellis's girlfriend, later wife, and one of the Colony House residents. At the end of the fourth season, she gains the ability to transform into one of the creatures.
- Corteon Moore as Ellis Stevens, Boyd's son, who lives estranged from his father at Colony House
- Hannah Cheramy as Julie Matthews, Jim and Tabitha's teenage daughter and Ethan's older sister, who at first chooses to live at Colony House, where she befriends Ellis and Fatima
- Simon Webster as Ethan Matthews, Jim and Tabitha's young son and Julie's younger brother, who lives with his parents in the Township
- Avery Konrad as Sara Myers, Nathan's sister who works at the Township's diner. She has frequent hallucinations that command her to kill other residents of the Township.
- Paul Zinno as Nathan Myers (season 1), (Note: Zinno is credited as a series regular from 1x01 through 1x05.) Sara's brother, who lives in the Township and tends to the farmed animals
- Elizabeth Moy as Tian-Chen Liu (seasons 1–3), (Note: Moy is credited as a series regular from 1x01 through 3x02.) Kenny's mother and Bing-Qian's wife, who runs the diner in the Township
- Deborah Grover as Tillie (seasons 2–3), (Note: Grover is credited as a series regular from 2x01 through 3x08.) an aging, carefree woman and one of the bus passengers who arrive at the town
- Angela Moore as Bakta (season 2–present), (Note: Moore is only credited for the episodes she appears in.) a bus driver who unknowingly brings many new arrivals to the town
- Kaelen Ohm as Marielle Sinclair (seasons 2–4), Kristi's fiancée, a pediatric nurse, and one of the bus passengers who arrive at the town
- A.J. Simmons as Randall Kirkland (season 2–present), a volatile, quick-to-anger man and one of the bus passengers who arrive at the town
- Nathan D. Simmons as Elgin Williams (seasons 2–4), one of the bus passengers who had a prophetic dream about the town while arriving there. He is first contacted by the "Boy in White", and is later manipulated by the "Kimono Woman".
- Robert Joy as Henry Kavanaugh (season 3–present), Victor's father, who lived alone in Camden, Maine, for forty years after the disappearance of his wife and children
- Samantha Brown as Dani Acosta (season 3–present), a police officer brought to the town after picking up Tabitha and Henry in the outside world
- Julia Doyle as Sophia (season 4), a new arrival at the town who presents as a sheltered and vulnerable pastor's daughter. Sophia is a disguise used by the shapeshifting "Man in Yellow" to infiltrate the townspeople.
  - Douglas E. Hughes as the "Man in Yellow" (recurring season 4; guest season 3), a powerful evil shapeshifting entity, who first contacted Jim over the radio at the end of the first season.

=== Recurring ===
- Reid Price as Tom (season 1; guest seasons 2–3), the Township's friendly bartender and a former college professor of philosophy
- Cynthia Jimenez-Hicks as Trudy (season 1), Ellis and Fatima's friend, and one of the Colony House residents
- Vox Smith as the "Boy in White" (season 1; guest seasons 2–4), a mysterious child-like figure who only a select number of the townspeople can see. This includes Ethan, Sara, Victor, and Tabitha.
- Katerina Bakolias as Clara, a superstitious Colony House resident
- Cliff Saunders as Dale (seasons 1–2; guest season 3), a semi-antagonistic and uncooperative Colony House resident
- Matthias Fenez as Matthias (season 2), the doorman for Colony House
- Zach Faye as Reggie (season 2), a resident of the Township whose wife, Paula, was mysteriously killed in her sleep
- Shuoxin Fu as the "Kimono Woman" (season 3; guest season 2), a monstrous corpse-like woman wearing a kimono whom Elgin and Fatima see during visions
- Eugene Sampang as Roger (season 4; guest season 3), a belligerent Colony House resident
- Trina Corkum as Patty (season 4; guest season 3), a Colony House resident who later has half her face severely burnt

=== Guest ===
- Simon Sinn as Bing-Qian Liu (seasons 1–2), Kenny's father and Tian-Chen's husband, who has dementia and lives in the Township with a collection of recipe books and enjoys chess. In the second season, he appears during flashbacks.
- Bob Mann as Frank Pratt (season 1), a resident of the Township whose wife and daughter were killed the night before the Matthews family arrived at the town
- Colby Conrad as Tobey McCray (season 1), Jade's best friend, who arrives with him at the town on the same day as the Matthews family
- Jessica Barry as Gina (season 1), a resident of the Township who helps care for Bing-Qian
- Jamie McGuire as the "Smiley Creature", or "Smiley", one of the creatures that torment the town, who is notable for the ever-present grin on his face. After being killed during the second season, he is reborn at the end of the third season.
- Christopher Hayes as Kevin (season 1), a Colony House resident who falls in love with one of the creatures
- Molly Dunsworth as "Jasmine" (season 1), a creature with whom Kevin becomes infatuated
- Lisa Ryder as Abby Stevens (seasons 1–2, 4), Boyd's wife, Ellis's mother, and a retired US Marine who appears during flashbacks and visions
- Robert Verlaque as Martin (seasons 2–3), a strange older man Boyd finds chained to a wall
- Seamus Patterson as Brick (season 2), one of the bus passengers who has claustrophobia
- Phoebe Rex as Kelly (season 2), one of the bus passengers who goes missing with her boyfriend after arriving in the town
- Taras Lesiuk as Brian (season 2), one of the bus passengers and Kelly's boyfriend
- Annika Borg as Paula (season 2), Reggie's wife, who is mysteriously killed in her sleep
- Ellie Cluett as Eloise Kavanaugh (season 2), Victor's younger sister, who was killed during Victor's childhood by the creatures
- Paula Feener as Meredith (seasons 2–4), a Colony House resident
- Sharleen Kalayil as Dr. Brody (seasons 2–3), a doctor in Camden, Maine, who treats Tabitha
- Tamara Fifield as Nicky (season 3), an unsympathetic Colony House resident
- Rhys Bevan-John as the Pastor (season 4), a pastor who crashes his car after arriving at the Township

== Episodes ==
Season	Episodes	Originally released		
Season	Episodes	First released	Last released	Network
1	10	February 20, 2022	April 10, 2022	Epix
2	10	April 23, 2023	June 25, 2023	MGM+
3	10	September 22, 2024	November 24, 2024	MGM+
4	10	April 19, 2026	June 28, 2026	MGM+

== Production ==
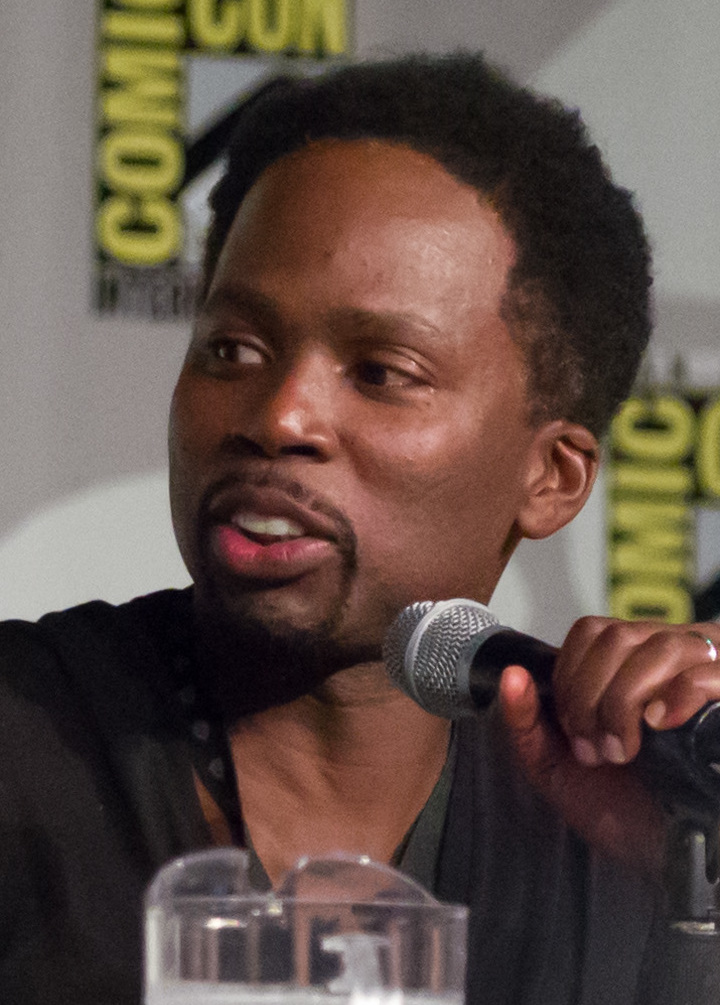
Lead actor Harold Perrineau at the 2014 San Diego Comic Con

On June 7, 2018, YouTube Red announced the development of the John Griffin–created series as part of an overall deal between production companies Midnight Radio and the Russo brothers' AGBO. By April 2021, the series was transferred to Epix after YouTube Red, now YouTube Premium, moved into unscripted programming. The project received an order of ten episodes, with Jack Bender to direct the first four. In May 2021, Harold Perrineau, Eion Bailey and Catalina Sandino Moreno were cast in lead roles. In July, Shaun Majumder, Elizabeth Saunders, Avery Konrad, Hannah Cheramy, Ricky He, Simon Webster, Chloe Van Landschoot, and Pegah Ghafoori joined the cast. The opening theme song, "Que Sera, Sera (Whatever Will Be, Will Be)" (1956), was performed as a cover by American alt-rock band the Pixies; the music score was composed by Chris Tilton.

The first season began filming in May 2021 in Halifax, Nova Scotia, Canada, with principal photography around Beaver Bank and Sackville River, in the suburban community of Lower Sackville.

On April 24, 2022, Epix renewed the series for a second season. On June 29, 2023, MGM+ renewed the series for a third season.

On November 21, 2024, MGM+ renewed the series for a fourth season. Filming for the season began in June 2025 in Nova Scotia, and concluded that November.

On April 15, 2026, MGM+ renewed the series for a fifth and final season. Filming for the season began on July 6, 2026, in Nova Scotia and will conclude on November 28.

== Release ==
The series premiered on Epix on February 20, 2022. In Australia, it is distributed by Stan. In the UK, it is broadcast on Sky Sci-Fi. In Canada, France, Italy, Germany, Austria and in Switzerland, it is available to stream on Paramount+. In India, it is available to stream on Amazon Prime Video. In the Middle East & North Africa, it is available to stream on OSN+. In Latin America, the series is available to stream on Universal+, while in Spain, it is available to stream on HBO Max.

The second season premiered on the rebranded MGM+ on April 23, 2023. The third season premiered on September 2, 2024. The fourth season premiered on April 19, 2026. The fifth and final season is scheduled to premiere in 2027.

In October 2026, it was announced that the first three seasons would stream for a limited time on Netflix, starting that October 19, as part of a licensing agreement.

== Reception ==
Critical response of From
Season	Rotten Tomatoes	Metacritic
1	96% (25 reviews)	63 (7 reviews)
2	93% (15 reviews)	—N/a
3	100% (25 reviews)	—N/a
4	96% (20 reviews)	—N/a

=== Season 1 ===
On review aggregator website Rotten Tomatoes, 96% of 25 reviews for the first season are positive, with an average rating of 6.8/10. The website's critical consensus reads, "Ably anchored by Harold Perrineau, From is an intriguing journey toward a mysterious destination." Metacritic, which uses a weighted average, assigned a score of 63 out of 100 based on seven critics, indicating "generally favorable reviews".

=== Season 2 ===
On Rotten Tomatoes, 93% of 15 reviews for the second season are positive, with an average rating of 7.3/10. The website's critical consensus reads, "Skillfully maintaining its balance of puzzle box teasing and genuine pathos, From's second season is a spooky sci-fi treat."

=== Season 3 ===
On Rotten Tomatoes, 100% of 25 reviews for the third season are positive, with an average rating of 8.2/10. The website's critical consensus reads, "From strategically unspools its taut story just enough to reel audiences back in with another horrifying season of chills and thrills."

=== Season 4 ===
On Rotten Tomatoes, 96% of 20 reviews for the fourth season are positive, with an average rating of 8.5/10.

== Awards and nominations ==
Award	Year	Category	Nominee	Result	Ref.
Critic's Choice Super Awards	2025	Best Horror Series, Limited Series or Made-for-TV Movie	From	Nominated	
Critic's Choice Super Awards	2025	Best Actor in a Horror Series, Limited Series or Made-for-TV Movie	Harold Perrineau	Nominated	
Critic's Choice Super Awards	2026	Best Actor in a Horror Series, Limited Series or Made-for-TV Movie	Harold Perrineau	Nominated	
Fangoria Chainsaw Awards	2025	Best Series	From	Nominated	
Imagen Foundation Awards	2023	Best Supporting Actress – Drama (Television)	Catalina Sandino Moreno	Nominated	
Leo Awards	2023	Best Supporting Performance by a Male in a Dramatic Series	Ricky He	Won	
Leo Awards	2024	Best Supporting Performance Dramatic Series	Ricky He	Nominated	
NAACP Image Awards	2025	Outstanding Actor in a Drama Series	Harold Perrineau	Nominated	
Satellite Awards	2023	Best Television Series – Genre	From	Nominated	
Satellite Awards	2024	Best Television Series – Genre	From	Nominated	
Saturn Awards	2022	Best Actor in a Network or Cable Television Series	Harold Perrineau	Nominated	
Saturn Awards	2022	Best Horror Television Series: Network/Cable	From	Nominated	
Saturn Awards	2024	Best Actor in a Network or Cable Television Series	Harold Perrineau	Nominated	
Saturn Awards	2024	Best Horror Television Series: Network/Cable	From	Nominated	
Saturn Awards	2025	Best Actor in a Network or Cable Television Series	Harold Perrineau	Nominated	
Saturn Awards	2025	Best Supporting Actress in a Television Series	Elizabeth Saunders	Nominated	
Saturn Awards	2025	Best Young Performer in a Television Series	Hannah Cheramy	Nominated	
Saturn Awards	2025	Best Horror Television Series: Network/Cable	From	Won	
Young Artist Award	2023	Best Performance in a TV Series: Supporting Youth Artist	Simon Webster	Nominated	
