= Aviva Armour-Ostroff =

Canadian actress, writer and filmmaker

Aviva Armour-Ostroff is a Canadian actress, writer and filmmaker. She is most noted as the star, co-writer and co-director of the 2021 film Lune, for which she received a Canadian Screen Award nomination for Best Actress at the 10th Canadian Screen Awards in 2022.

She was formerly the producer of Toronto's Lab Cab theatre festival. She is a two-time Dora Mavor Moore Award nominee for her stage performances, receiving a solo nomination for ARC Stage's production of Deirdre Kinahan's play Moment in 2015, and an ensemble nomination alongside Deborah Drakeford, Carlos González-Vío, Ryan Hollyman, Andre Sills and Arlen Aguayo-Stewart, for ARC's production of Stef Smith's play Human Animals in 2019.

She is married to Arturo Pérez Torres, with whom she codirected both The Drawer Boy and Lune.
