= No One Would Tell (1996 film) =

1996 television film directed by Noel Nosseck

- DVD cover
- Genre: Drama; Teen; Thriller; Sport; Crime; Biography
- Written by: Steven Loring
- Directed by: Noel Nosseck
- Starring: Candace Cameron; Fred Savage; Michelle Phillips
- Theme music composer: Michael Tavera
- Country of origin: United States
- Original language: English

Production
- Producers: Artie Mandelberg; Randy Sutter
- Cinematography: Paul Maibaum
- Editor: Michael Brown
- Running time: 96 minutes
- Production companies: Frank & Bob Films II; Hallmark Entertainment von Zerneck-Sertner Films

Original release
- Network: NBC
- Release: May 6, 1996

No One Would Tell is a 1996 American teen crime drama television film directed by Noel Nosseck from an original script by Steven Loring. It premiered on NBC on May 6, 1996. It is inspired by the true story of 14-year-old Amy Carnevale, who was physically abused and murdered by her 16-year-old boyfriend, Jamie Fuller, on August 23, 1991, in Beverly, Massachusetts. A remake debuted on Lifetime on September 16, 2018.

== Plot ==
In Phoenix, Arizona, 16 year old Stacy Collins is sitting in the high school gymnasium one afternoon with her two best friends Nikki and Val, discussing boys while watching a wrestling meet. Stacy notices 18-year-old wrestler and senior student Robert "Bobby" Tennison, whom she has been crushing on for two years. Later that night, Nikki and Stacy go to a local pizza joint and Stacy starts talking to Bobby, who is there with his friends from the wrestling team. Bobby gives Stacy a flower. He eventually invites her and her friends to a late night lake party. There, Bobby and Stacy sneak off, and eventually learn that their fathers abandoned them, revealing that they are both looking for someone who will understand them. They kiss and start their dating relationship.

Meanwhile Stacy's mother, Laura, is dating Rod Merredi, who is emotionally abusive. Bobby comes to pick Stacy up one night meeting Laura and Rod beforehand and they then go on their first date.

Bobby eventually starts showing possessive behavior. It starts in the school library when he gets angry at Stacy for inviting friends to their study session and slowly escalates to him getting angry when she shares his private love poetry he wrote for her with friends at the lake. He later comes up with controlling rules for their relationship; he wants Stacy to always be home at night when he calls and not hang out with anyone when they are together. He then occasionally apologizes after getting mad at her, says that he loves her, and gives her gifts.

While shopping with her friend, Nicki one day, Stacy reveals bruises on her back. They come from the night she lost her virginity to Bobby. At school, boys start to notice her after Nicki convinces her to wear a mid-thigh length skirt. Eventually, a boy compliments her. Outraged, Bobby later says that she looks like a slut and forces her to wear pants for the rest of the day. After she says that she was only dressing up for him, he slams her into a wall. His school coach, Murphy, considers reporting the incident, but Stacy defends him by saying that she "slipped".

Stacy starts missing events because Bobby has limited her time with friends. Nicki learns that his previous girlfriend, Tracy, changed schools after being hit by him. Nicki later notices more bruises on Stacy's arm and tries to confront her about it out of concern. Stacy, frustrated, says that she can take care of herself.

Stacy later bumps into Bobby's mother, Rita, whom he forbade her to meet. After catching them talking to each other, he slams her into a truck. Upset, she refuses to see him again. However, he later sneaks into her house after Laura goes out with Rod. He coaxes her back into a relationship by relating to her with stories of his estranged father, who was an abusive alcoholic.

They later attend a 1950s themed school dance, where Bobby eventually sees Stacy talking to another boy. He pulls her into the parking lot and slaps her.

Nicki and the rest of Stacy and Bobby’s friends witness this and are worried, Nikki tries to take Stacy back inside to the dance but Bobby intervenes. Stacy defends Bobby, saying that he has been through a lot. Returning home, she hears Laura arguing with Rod and decides to stay at Nicki's instead. Laura breaks up with Rod that night and calls Stacy at Nikki’s to tell her the good news.

After her mom dumps Rod, Stacy decides to finally break up with Bobby as well. Nikki invites Stacy to a bowling birthday party to forget Bobby. Carla, a mutual friend at the same party who is also in love with Bobby, tries to make plans with him. He takes advantage of this opportunity to offer to pick Stacy up and have her hang out at his place. He invites Carla too. There, he accuses Stacy of being with another boy at the party and slaps her.

In private, Bobby kisses Carla and says that if anyone asks, he and Stacy fought that night and that she left after the fight. After this, Carla leaves.

Later that night, Bobby, accompanied by his friend, Vince Fortner, convinces Stacy to take a ride in his car. He drives them to their spot at the lake and walks off with her while Vince waits in the car. The next day, it is reported that she is missing.

Laura and Nicki go out looking for Stacy after Laura calls Nikki asking where Stacy is. Bobby helps in the search. Laura reports Stacy’s disappearance to Detective Anderson who is working on the case. Laura suspects that Bobby was involved in her disappearance and finds her purse in his room. Pretending to be concerned about her, Bobby enlists people to help look for her. Meanwhile, Nicki interrogates Carla, who repeats what Bobby told her to say. Nicki eventually informs Laura and Detective Anderson how abusive Stacy's relationship with Bobby was. Laura admits she saw bruises on Stacy but never realized Bobby was to blame. Carla later admits that he and Vince took Stacy to the lake.

Bobby and Vince get arrested, and Bobby blames Stacy's disappearance on Vince. After admitting that Bobby was the one last seen with her, Vince is free to go. Anderson initially gently tells Bobby he suspects voluntary manslaughter and will help Bobby out if he cooperates, but Bobby refuses to admit to anything. Anderson cracks down and furiously demands answers from Bobby, who finally realizes there's no way out and admits that he slit Stacy's throat when she refused to resume their relationship, meaning he killed her.

Stacy's body is found in the lake, wrapped in a trash bag bound with duct tape and tied down with cinder blocks. A very distraught and anguished Mrs Collins and Nikki are at the lake when her body is discovered. A court trial follows, where witnesses at school admit that they saw Bobby hit Stacy but did nothing figuring that she would leave him eventually. He is eventually found guilty of first-degree murder, and sentenced to life in prison without parole, much to the relief of Stacy’s mom. The judge then gives Stacy's classmates and families a stern lecture about their inaction in witnessing her abuse. As Nicki tearfully mourns Stacy's death, she and her boyfriend Tony later leave flowers at the edge of the lake where Stacy's body was found.

== Cast ==
- Candace Cameron as Stacy Collins
- Fred Savage as Robert "Bobby" Tennison
- Michelle Phillips as Laura Collins
- Gregory Alan Williams as Detective Anderson
- Heather McComb as Nicki
- Justina Machado as Val Cho
- Eric Balfour as Vince Fortner
- Rodney Eastman as Tony Dinardo
- Tiana Marie Brown as Emily Stone
- Martha Romo as Carla
- Paige Moss as Donna Fowler
- Steve Smith as Steve McGuire
- Sally Jessy Raphael as Judge Bailey
- Paul Linke as Rod Merredi

== Reception ==
The film received mixed reviews from critics, but Candace Cameron and Heather McComb were praised for their acting performances.

== Remake ==
The film was remade by Lifetime, with Shannen Doherty as Laura Collins, Matreya Scarrwener as Sarah Collins, and Callan Potter as Rob Tennison, and premiered on September 16, 2018.
