= Richard Clarkin =

Canadian actor

Richard Clarkin is a Canadian actor. He is most noted for his performance in the 2017 film The Drawer Boy, for which he won the Canadian Screen Award for Best Supporting Actor at the 7th Canadian Screen Awards in 2019.

== Career ==
Clarkin's other roles include Andrew Jackson in the television mini-series War of 1812, Paul in Finn's Girl, Rich Cook in Ordinary Days, Inspector Davis in Murdoch Mysteries, Gord Ogilvey in Goon and Goon: Last of the Enforcers, Ben in Easy Land, Walter Hawthorne in Naturally, Sadie, and Dick Dunphy in Son of a Critch.

Clarkin was a Dora Mavor Moore Award nominee for Outstanding Performance by a Male in a Principal Role – Play (Large Theatre) in 2018 for his performance in Confederation & Riel. He also played Jacob Mercer in the premiere production of David French's Salt-Water Moon in 1984.

== Filmography ==
=== Film ===
Year	Title	Role	Notes
1999	The Five Senses	Raymond	
1999	Teenage Space Vampires	Davers	
2000	City of Fear	Venco	Direct-to-video
2004	Sisters in the Wilderness: The Lives of Susanna Moodie and Catharine Parr Traill	John Moodie	
2005	Land of the Dead	Steele	
2007	The Third Eye	Michael Miller	
2007	Finn's Girl	Paul	
2008	Production Office	Dick	
2010	You Are Here	Hal	
2010	Casino Jack	Partner #1	
2011	Goon	Gord Ogilvey	
2013	Molly Maxwell	Raymond	
2013	Solo	Fred	
2014	The Anniversary	Paul Miller	
2017	Goon: Last of the Enforcers	Gord Ogilvey	
2017	Great Great Great	David Paolini	
2017	The Drawer Boy	Morgan	
2017	Ordinary Days	Rich Cook	
2018	Extracurricular	Dave Lauderback	
2019	Easy Land	Ben	
2020	Learning to Love Again	Joe	
2020	Stardust	Mickelson	
2021	Carmen	Tom	

=== Television ===
Year	Title	Role	Notes
1993, 1996	Kung Fu: The Legend Continues	Bonaduce / Pearce	2 episodes
1997	La Femme Nikita	Gabriel Tyler	Episode: "Mercy"
1997	F/X: The Series	Pistone	Episode: "Shooting Mickey"
1998	Rescuers: Stories of Courage: Two Couples	Simon	Television film
1998	Mythic Warriors	Hermes	2 episodes
1999	Psi Factor	Earl Carpenter / Sid	2 episodes
1999	War of 1812	Andrew Jackson	4 episodes
1999	Monet: Shadow and Light	Pierre-Auguste Renoir	Television film
1999, 2002	Earth: Final Conflict	Nason / Mitchell	2 episodes
2000	The Thin Blue Lie	Scala	Television film
2002	Queer as Folk	Shepherd Frankel	Episode: "...Wherever That Dream May Lead You"
2003	Penguins Behind Bars	Charlie Abaloney	Television short
2005–2007	Naturally, Sadie	Walter Hawthorne	17 episodes
2006	Playing House	Richard	Television film
2007	Fire Serpent	Kohler	Television film
2008	The Border	Pavel Makarov	Episode: "Compromising Positions"
2008	Miss Spider's Sunny Patch Friends	Holley	Episode: "Night and Day/Cob Fog"
2009	Flashpoint	Rafer Wilcox	Episode: "One Wrong Move"
2010	Heartland	Keith	Episode: "One Day"
2010–2017	Murdoch Mysteries	Jeffrey Davis	7 episodes
2011	Republic of Doyle	Edward	Episode: "Something Old, Someone New"
2011	The Listener	Sasha Mirinov	Episode: "The Brothers Volkov"
2012	Lost Girl	Brother Douglas	Episode: "Fae-nted Love"
2012	The Firm	John Hannon	Episode: "Chapter Ten"
2014	Forget and Forgive	Clay Russo	Television film
2014	Suits	Jacob Walker	Episode: "Moot Point"
2014	The Transporter	Tommy Sands	Episode: "Sixteen Hands"
2015	Bitten	Dr. Randall Penner	Episode: "Rabbit Hole"
2015	Killjoys	Hogan	Episode: "A Glitch in the System"
2015	Rogue	ADA Fred Yunker	Episode: "Beyond Judgement"
2015	Saving Hope	Ralph Lively	Episode: "Start Me Up"
2016	Ride	Bill	Episode: "We Need to Talk About Covington"
2018	Burden of Truth	Nate Dawson	3 episodes
2020	Nurses	Arlo Walker	4 episodes
2021	I Was Lorena Bobbitt	Mr. Howard	Television film
2022	Son of a Critch	Dick Dunphy	5 episodes
2026	Memory of a Killer	Michael Doyle	4 episodes
