= Arturo Pérez Torres =

Canadian film director and screenwriter

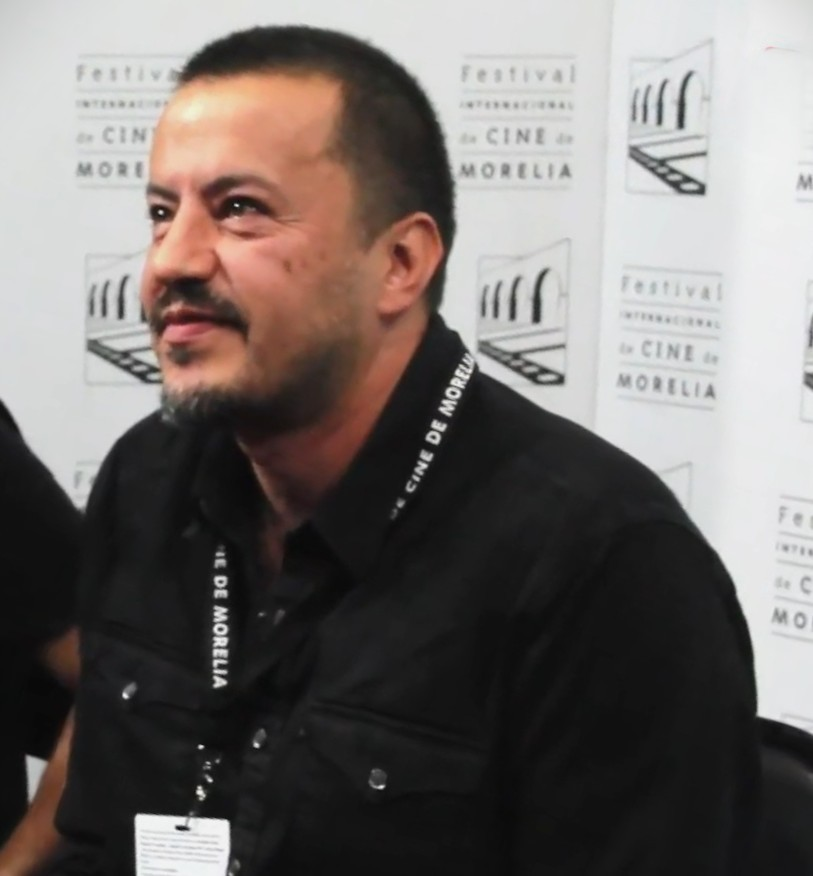
Torres in 2017

Arturo Pérez Torres is a Mexican-born Canadian film director and screenwriter. He is most noted for his 2017 film The Drawer Boy, for which he received a Canadian Screen Award nomination for Best Adapted Screenplay at the 7th Canadian Screen Awards in 2019.

Born and raised in Mexico City, he studied film at San Francisco State University and sociology at the University of Amsterdam, and worked in advertising as an art director until moving to Canada in 2003. He became a Canadian citizen in 2007, and won a Guggenheim Fellowship in 2009. He directed several documentary films before releasing The Drawer Boy, his first narrative feature film, in 2017.

He is married to Aviva Armour-Ostroff, his codirector of both The Drawer Boy and Lune.

== Filmography ==
- Wetback: The Undocumented Documentary - 2005
- Super Amigos - 2007
- City Idol - 2007
- Las águilas humanas - 2010
- Proyecto Nº 945 - 2013
- The Drawer Boy - 2017, with Aviva Armour-Ostroff
- Lune - 2021, with Aviva Armour-Ostroff
