= Lune (2021 film) =

2021 Canadian film

- Directed by: Arturo Pérez Torres; Aviva Armour-Ostroff
- Written by: Aviva Armour-Ostroff; Brian Ostroff
- Produced by: Arturo Pérez Torres; Aviva Armour-Ostroff
- Starring: Aviva Armour-Ostroff; Chloe Van Landschoot; Vlad Alexis
- Cinematography: Arturo Pérez Torres
- Edited by: Helen Salcedo
- Release date: March 20, 2021 (Cinequest)
- Running time: 113 minutes
- Country: Canada
- Language: English

Lune is a Canadian drama film, directed by Arturo Pérez Torres and Aviva Armour-Ostroff and released in 2021. The film stars Armour-Ostroff as Miriam, a South African immigrant in Canada who struggles with bipolar disorder, against the context of her preparations to move back to South Africa in order to vote for Nelson Mandela in the 1994 South African election.

The film's cast also includes Alanna Bale, Atticus Mitchell, Vlad Alexis and Chloe Van Landschoot.

The character of Miriam was based on Armour-Ostroff's father, Brian Ostroff, to such an extent that he was officially credited as a cowriter of the film even though he died several years before it entered production. He had previously been seen in Armour-Ostroff's 2017 short documentary film Dr. Bro’s Travelling Medicine Show.

The film premiered in March 2021 at the Cinequest Film & Creativity Festival in San Jose, California, and had its Canadian premiere in June at the Toronto Jewish Film Festival.

== Awards ==
At Cinequest, the film was named a winner of the Audience Award for Feature Drama.

At the Toronto Jewish Film Festival, it was named a winner of the Micki Moore Award for best narrative feature by a female director.

Armour-Ostroff received a Canadian Screen Award nomination for Best Actress at the 10th Canadian Screen Awards in 2022.
