= List of From episodes =

American science fiction horror episodes

From (stylized as FROM) is an American science fiction horror television series created by John Griffin that premiered on February 20, 2022, on Epix, which rebranded as MGM+ between its first and second seasons.

The series is set in a nightmarish town in the United States that traps those who enter. The unwilling residents strive to stay alive while plagued by terrifying nocturnal creatures from the surrounding forest as they search for secrets hidden within the town and beyond in the hope of finding a way out.

As of June 28, 2026, 40 episodes of From have aired, concluding the fourth season.

== Series overview ==
Season	Episodes	Originally released		
Season	Episodes	First released	Last released	Network
1	10	February 20, 2022	April 10, 2022	Epix
2	10	April 23, 2023	June 25, 2023	MGM+
3	10	September 22, 2024	November 24, 2024	MGM+
4	10	April 19, 2026	June 28, 2026	MGM+

== Episodes ==
=== Season 1 (2022) ===
No. overall	No. in season	Title	Directed by	Written by	Original release date
1	1	"Long Day's Journey into Night"	Jack Bender	John Griffin	February 20, 2022
A little girl and her mother are killed by a creature posing as an old woman after the girl lets it into their home. The Matthews family—Jim, Tabitha, and their children Julie and Ethan—are on a cross-country RV trip when they encounter a fallen tree blocking the road. Forced to detour, they enter a small town where the local sheriff, Boyd, tells them to follow the road. As they drive, they repeatedly loop back into the town, unable to leave. Eventually, another car collides with them, causing their RV to crash and flip. As night approaches, townspeople arrive to help. The passengers from the other car, Tobey and Jade, are taken back to town, while Boyd and the township doctor, Kristi, stay with Jim to treat Ethan, who has a severe leg injury. Elsewhere, Kenny, Tabitha, Julie, Father Khatri, Jade, and Ellis rush toward a place called "Colony House" for shelter before dark. When night falls, figures slowly approach the vehicle and surround it.
2	2	"The Way Things Are Now"	Jack Bender	John Griffin	February 20, 2022
The group barely reaches Colony House, where they are let in by the leader, Donna, just as the figures close in. Following protocol, Tabitha, Julie, and the unconscious Jade are separated and confined for safety. In the RV, Boyd, Kristi, and Jim manage to stabilize Ethan while the figures surround them outside. Boyd and Donna explain that the town is trapped by forests inhabited by intelligent, monstrous creatures that hunt and kill at night. All residents are people who became stranded there, including Victor, the longest survivor. Boyd also reveals that talismans placed inside enclosed spaces can protect against the creatures. At the clinic, Sara, influenced by mysterious voices, kills Tobey and opens the door, allowing the creatures to enter and kill Kenny's elderly father and his caretaker. By morning, Boyd and Kristi bring Jim and Ethan into town, while Kenny discovers the aftermath and mourns. At Colony House, Ethan looks out a window and sees a boy dressed in white.
3	3	"Choosing Day"	Jack Bender	John Griffin	February 20, 2022
After Jade wakes up, Donna explains the town's situation, but he dismisses it, believing it is an elaborate escape room set up by Tobey. Father Khatri later guides Jim and Tabitha through the town, telling them about "Choosing Day", when newcomers must decide between living in a private house or at Colony House. During the tour, he shows them a structure called the "Box", the town's only punishment, where someone is locked overnight and left exposed to the creatures. This fate is reserved for Frank, a man whose negligence led to the deaths of his wife and daughter. Although Boyd tries to spare him, Frank refuses. At Choosing Day, the Matthews family selects a private home, while Julie chooses to live at Colony House. Jade causes a disturbance and is taken to Tobey's grave, then later brought by Kenny to stay at his house. The Matthews settle into their new home, while Julie remains apart. That night, Frank is placed in the Box and killed by the creatures.
4	4	"A Rock and a Farway"	Jack Bender	Javier Grillo-Marxuach	February 27, 2022
In the past, Victor as a child witnesses the corpses of many town residents, after which the Boy in White appears and invites him to play. In the present, Ethan recognizes this same boy from one of Victor's drawings. Kenny shows Jade evidence that the town has no fixed physical location, and during their conversation a radio emits static, prompting Jade to take it. At Colony House, Julie becomes uneasy upon learning that everything is shared and life is communal. She confronts Tabitha about her and Jim's impending divorce, caused by the death of their child, Thomas. Tabitha returns home and argues with Jim. Victor takes Ethan into the woods to look for the Boy in White and shows him a hollow tree that teleports objects to another location. When Jim and Tabitha search for Ethan, they are surrounded by wild dogs, but Victor scares them away with a gun. At the diner, Sara experiences a seizure after a vision urges her to kill Ethan. Victor later digs several graves near Colony House.
5	5	"Silhouettes"	Brad Turner	Vivian Lee	March 6, 2022
Sara recovers at the clinic. Boyd begins to suspect that the town can cause some kind of physical reaction due to Sara's and Ethan's seizures; he reveals to Kristi developing tremors in his left hand. Seeking a second opinion, Sara questions if Kristi would do "one bad thing" for the whole town to go home, Kristi responds affirmatively as she has an abandoned fiancée. Independently, Jade and Jim begin to ask questions and think about the possibility that they died in the crash and are in purgatory. Sara locks Tabitha up in a barn and prepares to murder Ethan – Nathan arrives and stops her, having come clean to Father Khatri but in the struggle, Sara inadvertently kills Nathan when she accidentally slashes his throat with the blade she was going to use to kill Ethan.
6	6	"Book 74"	Brad Turner	John Griffin	March 13, 2022
Holding Sara captive in a cellar, Khatri explains to her that the modern Bible is composed of 73 books and his theory that the townspeople are being tested by God, their current situation formulating a new, 74th book. The voices prove their existence by reminding Khatri of a bag he buried when he first arrived. Boyd explains to Kenny his plan to venture out into the woods with a talisman to try to find a way to civilization; Kenny rejects this plan as a suicide attempt. Boyd confesses to Kenny that he is suffering from an extremely rare case of early-onset Parkinson's. Jade and Jim fix the radio with scavenged car parts, but it only receives static. Jade sees a vision of a Civil War-era soldier chasing him. He also sees a strange symbol in a tree. When Kenny's mother Tian-Chen notices, she shows him a discarded notebook with similar drawings. Returning home, Jim finds Tabitha digging a hole in the basement to find where the electricity power lines lead. At the Colony House, a resident named Kevin is shown to have a budding relationship with one of the creatures.
7	7	"All Good Things"	Jennifer Liao	Vivian Lee and John Griffin	March 20, 2022
Khatri tells Boyd about Sara and the voices, and suggests he and Sara join Boyd's expedition into the woods. Jim proposes building a proper radio tower using most of the town's resources, while he and Tabitha begin digging in the basement. Jade finds a photograph in a discarded notebook, and Tian-Chen identifies a young Victor in it. At Colony House, residents celebrate the first anniversary of Fatima's arrival. During the party, Fatima kisses another resident, making Julie uncomfortable. Kevin opens a window for his "friend", a creature, which kills him and leaves the window open, allowing others to enter. The creatures swarm Colony House, killing many residents, while some escape in a van. Ellis and Fatima survive by barricading themselves in the foyer using a talisman. Victor and Julie flee into the woods. Victor tells Julie to enter a faraway tree, and she is transported to a root cellar. The van reaches the sheriff's station as Boyd and Khatri let survivors in, but a creature kills Khatri.
8	8	"Broken Windows, Open Doors"	Jennifer Liao	Javier Grillo-Marxuach and John Griffin	March 27, 2022
Boyd, his wife Abby, and Ellis arrive in the town shortly before nightfall, where they meet Khatri, who leads them to a hidden cellar containing Donna and other residents. The next day, Khatri and Donna explain the town's situation, and Boyd assumes leadership to help organize survival efforts. He begins managing resources and foraging in the woods, where he mysteriously finds livestock. As he takes on more responsibility, Abby's mental health deteriorates. During a scavenging trip, Boyd becomes lost in the woods overnight and takes shelter in a cave surrounded by creatures, where he discovers talismans that protect against them. When he returns the next morning, Abby has begun shooting townspeople, believing they are trapped in a nightmare. As she prepares to shoot Ellis, Boyd kills her to save his son. In the present, Boyd and Ellis reconcile over Abby's death. Boyd and Sara set out into the woods, Kenny is appointed new sheriff, and Kenny, Donna, and Jim explain the plan to build a radio tower to the town.
9	9	"Into the Woods"	Jeff Renfroe	John Griffin	April 3, 2022
Boyd and Sara reach the cave where he first found the talismans and set it up as a point of reference. Traveling further than any townspeople had ever gone, they find a tree with small bottles dangling from the branches, and Sara has another seizure. In town, the people continue to build the Colony House radio tower but lack a power supply. Tian-Chen then gives Jade the idea to use the electricity from the town's houses. When Sara wakes up, the two are in a tent and Boyd shows Sara that the bottles had scraps of paper in them with one from 1864. Sara explains that this time, the voice was a female voice she had never heard before that instructed her to tell Boyd his plan was a mistake and there are worse things in the forest than the creatures. Sara then addresses Boyd by a nickname Abby used before the tent is attacked by an unseen force. When the assault ceases, the tent is lit up from the outside and the two hear a loud horn.
10	10	"Oh, the Places We'll Go"	Jeff Renfroe	John Griffin	April 10, 2022
The townspeople gather as much wiring as they can to power the radio tower. Ellis proposes to Fatima, who accepts; Kenny makes an advance on Kristi, who rejects him because she is already engaged. Boyd and Sara leave the tent to discover they are in an area of forest covered by spiderwebs. Boyd is bitten by spiders after approaching what he believes to be a cocooned Abby. Boyd becomes delirious from the bites, but Sara convinces him to persevere. The townspeople get the radio tower working as a storm approaches. Jim reaches someone on the radio, but the threatening voice addresses him by name and says that Tabitha should not be digging. As Jim races home, the hole in the basement collapses. Tabitha falls into a cave and is met by Victor, who says that the underground is where the creatures sleep. Boyd and Sara see that the light and horn originate from a lighthouse. The Boy in White instructs Sara to enter a nearby "farway" tree. Sara pushes Boyd into the tree, and he is transported into a shaft where he is trapped. At the diner, a bus arrives in town.

=== Season 2 (2023) ===
No. overall	No. in season	Title	Directed by	Written by	Original release date
11	1	"Strangers in a Strange Land"	Jack Bender	Story by : John Griffin & Jeff Pinkner; Teleplay by : John Griffin	April 23, 2023
A passenger on a bus warns of danger, prompting residents to corral passengers and fortify a nearby building. Donna tries to convince Bakta, the bus driver, of the danger, but when she tries to leave, Donna shoots out a tire on the bus, causing some passengers to flee. Jade explains the importance of symbols in a journal to Ethan. Jim, Tom, and two passengers try to rescue Tabitha in a hole, but the house caves in and traps them. Victor and Tabitha explore tunnels and find a forest, narrowly escaping when the creatures inside wake up. With the help of an unseen stranger, Boyd climbs out of the mineshaft. He discovers the stranger is a ragged, emaciated man chained to a wall in a dungeon. The man asks Boyd to kill him.
12	2	"The Kindness of Strangers"	Jack Bender	Story by : John Griffin & Jeff Pinkner; Teleplay by : John Griffin	April 30, 2023
Boyd refuses to kill the man, whose name is Martin, and tries to free him instead. Martin warns Boyd that the creatures in the forest are only the "tip of the spear". Boyd sees a music box on the ground which starts playing on its own. Martin suddenly grabs Boyd by the arm and transfers some sort of worm-like parasites to him before dying. Boyd then finds himself back in the forest. Kristi tries to reconnect with Marielle, her girlfriend and one of the passengers on the bus. At night, while Donna forces most of the bus passengers to shelter at the diner, the creatures hunt down and kill anyone outside, including Tom who is trapped under the collapsed house, while Jim watches on in horror. Boyd makes his way out of the forest and meets up with Victor and Tabitha, who have taken shelter in an old trailer.
13	3	"Tether"	Alexandra La Roche	Story by : John Griffin & Jeff Pinkner; Teleplay by : John Griffin	May 7, 2023
Ellis confronts Boyd about being in the forest for so long and losing Sara. Ellis says that he thinks Fatima is losing a piece of herself. As Jim is recuperating in the hospital, Tabitha reveals that the wires are not connected to anything. Boyd attempts to defuse the situation with Randall and the rest of the bus passengers, who are taken up to Colony House. While Kenny is checking the traps and Ellis is picking flowers, they discover Kelly, one of the passengers staked to a tree with a rod missing from one of the traps. After discovering his violin is missing, Victor confronts Jade, who asks about the symbol. Victor storms off. Kristi and Marielle begin to discuss their relationship, but Kenny comes to get help for Kelly. Fatima takes Elgin to the Brundles, which he said he saw in his dream on the bus. Kristi breaks the news to Kelly that she will not survive. Tabitha sees the strange children while she and Julie are preparing to move in with the Lius. Ethan works on a sculpture puzzle and Tabitha sees that it resembles the stone pile she saw collapse in the tunnels. Kenny discovers Sara in the basement of the church.
14	4	"This Way Gone"	Alexandra La Roche	Story by : John Griffin & Jeff Pinkner; Teleplay by : John Griffin	May 14, 2023
We see the arrival of the Lius in flashback. Kenny takes Boyd to Sara at the church. Boyd tells Kenny about Sara's unique connection to the town. Julie and Ethan visit Colony House. Julie sees Elgin staring off into the distance and engages him in conversation. Kristi and Boyd discuss the progression of his Parkinsons disease and his recent injuries from the forest. Jim tells Tabitha about the voice over the radio and his suspicions about being watched. Boyd has a vision of Father Khatri who discusses with him the situation between Sara and Kenny. Jim and Donna discuss the voice on the radio. Randall has another outburst at Colony House and Donna puts him out into the bus. Sara tells Kenny about opening the clinic door and he confronts Boyd and quits as deputy.
15	5	"Lullaby"	Jack Bender	John Griffin & Vivian Lee	May 21, 2023
Randall spends his first night in the bus. Jade sees a vision of Christopher, who is holding the book with the symbols, which starts to drip blood. Jim and Tabitha confront Boyd and Sara at the church. Ethan locks himself in his room after hearing his family talk about Sara. He asks to see Sara. Kristi and Marielle bond. Sara sneaks into her and Nathan's old house and is rebuffed by the current occupants. Victor shows Jade the car graveyard and asks him to play his violin. Elgin and Sara talk at the church. Sara goes to the diner to get her and Nathan's things. She is confronted by Kenny. Kristi gets a haircut. Victor tells Jade about Christopher. Tabitha is confronted by the chanting children. Jim tells Boyd about the voice over the radio. Marielle sneaks morphine. Boyd asks Tian-Chen to talk.
16	6	"Pas de Deux"	Jack Bender	Story by : John Griffin & Jeff Pinkner; Teleplay by : John Griffin	May 28, 2023
Boyd talks to Tian-Chen about Sara's presence in the town. Dale argues that the people from the bus shouldn't be allowed food since there are shortages. During the argument Dale stabs Ellis. Elgin drives him to the clinic with Fatima at night. Boyd is needed to transfuse blood to save Ellis. He goes into the night to get the creatures to pass on his worm-like parasites. He passes the parasites on to the "Smiley" creature, which kills the creature in the process. Fatima asks Kristi for a pregnancy test. Ellis's transfusion is successful. Kenny admits they should have believed Boyd about his journey into the forest and the parasites under his skin.
17	7	"Belly of the Beast"	Brad Turner	Story by : John Griffin & Jeff Pinkner; Teleplay by : John Griffin	June 4, 2023
Kristi prepares for the autopsy. Jim and Tabitha discuss whether Ethan should spend time with Victor. One of the people from the bus, Randall, flies his drone over Jim. Victor tries to be mean to Ethan as he says bad things happen to his friends. Jim tries to convince Randall that he would be useful in the quest to escape. Marielle starts to go through withdrawal. Kenny wonders where the worms have gone. Jade admits his vision to Tabitha. Jim tells Randall his theory about the place being an experiment, Randall asks whether he's thought about who might be in on the experiment. Marielle has a dream about the creature waking up and the music box playing. Fatima tells Donna that she was told she couldn't have children. Kristi discovers the creature's insides to be dry except bile which they extract. Elgin tries to remember an important detail from his dream. He draws a bath, hears the music box and then appears to be held under the water by a monstrous woman wearing a kimono.
18	8	"Forest for the Trees"	Brad Turner	John Griffin & Vivian Lee	June 11, 2023
Kenny dreams about the phone ringing in the house. When he answers a voice chants, "They touch, they break, they steal. No one here is free." He then has a vision of cicada-like creatures coming out of the cooking pot. Randall begins to stoke fears of a conspiracy in town that residents may be in on their captivity. Tabitha shows Jade the tunnel entrance where she saw the symbol and the chanting children. Victor does not tell Jade the whole truth about the symbols because when people ask questions and look for answers, they do not return. Boyd and Kenny burn the body of the creature in the basement after discovering no bugs inside. Victor leads Tabitha to the car graveyard and shows her the drawings. This triggers a flashback of his mother and sister leaving him in the cellar. They see the drawing of the tower and Victor says that this is where his mother went to "save the children". Boyd and Kenny hear cicadas and Reggie, a resident of the town, leaves his house screaming. Jim finds Donna tied to a tree in the forest and learns that Randall was responsible after vying to test his theories.
19	9	"Ball of Magic Fire"	Jack Bender	Story by : John Griffin & Jeff Pinkner; Teleplay by : John Griffin	June 18, 2023
Boyd and Kenny discover that the cicadas killed Reggie's wife in her sleep. Before dying, she said, "They touch, they break, they steal. No one here is free." Boyd gathers residents to canvass the town to let them know they need to stay awake. Boyd catches Randall holding Jim at knife point. Kenny agrees to keep Sara at the sheriff station. Reggie is taken to Colony House and informs the residents that they must stay awake. Kristi and Marielle settle in at Colony House. Boyd, Donna, Jim, and Randall spend the night in the RV. The creatures come out of the forest but stop short as the music box music starts to play over the radio. Randall freaks out and breaks the RV window, runs in the forest, and is attacked by cicadas. Boyd, Jim, and Donna escape in the van. While going through withdrawal, Marielle sees a vision of cicadas and lapses into a coma. Elgin recounts his dream to Boyd and the others in which the Boy in White says, "Here they come, they come for three, unless you stop the melody". Bakta says that her grandmother used to sing a nursery rhyme that combines the two phrases. Julie also has a vision and lapses into a coma.
20	10	"Once Upon a Time..."	Jack Bender	John Griffin & Jeff Pinkner	June 25, 2023
Donna recovers Randall, who is in a coma. Sara tells Boyd that he caused this to happen by inadvertently releasing the entity, and that he needs to destroy the music box. Following Ellis and a pregnant Fatima's marriage, Boyd returns to the ruins. He finds himself back in the dungeon and sees Julie, Marielle, and Randall chained and being tortured by an unseen force. He goes to destroy the box but has a vision of Abby who says that fighting the entity will only prolong everyone's suffering. Boyd ignores her and destroys the box, causing the prisoners to awaken from their comas and seemingly ending the immediate threat to the town. Jade searches the tunnels and has a vision of seven children chanting at an opening in the ceiling which matches the symbol he has been seeing. Victor takes Tabitha to a tree which transports her to the tower, where she believes that the children are being kept prisoner. At the top, she is met by the Boy in White, who apologizes and explains "this is the only way" before shoving Tabitha out a window. Tabitha later awakens in a hospital in the outside world; she was found on the side of a trail three days earlier.

=== Season 3 (2024) ===
No. overall	No. in season	Title	Directed by	Written by	Original release date
21	1	"Shatter"	Jack Bender	Story by : John Griffin & Jeff Pinkner; Teleplay by : John Griffin	September 22, 2024
In the outside world, Tabitha learns that she is in a hospital in Camden, Maine. She sneaks out of the hospital, confused as to how she got there and where to go next. She later finds an address written at the bottom of Victor's lunchbox and after arriving there she meets Henry Kavanaugh, Victor's father. In the Township, Jim and Kenny search for the lighthouse where Tabitha disappeared. On their way, they find a previously undiscovered settlement and camp there for the night. Donna discovers that all the remaining crops at Colony House have become rotten, leaving the farm animals as their only food source. With dwindling resources, several townspeople including Randall attempt to steal the animals but are talked down by Boyd. Later that night, the creatures release the animals from their pens to lure the residents from their homes. Jade and Victor manage to save many of the smaller animals while Boyd and Tian-Chen escort a cow back to the barn. After Boyd puts up a talisman, several creatures are revealed to have already been hiding inside the barn and handcuff Boyd before forcing him to watch them torture Tian-Chen to death.
22	2	"When We Go"	Jack Bender	Story by : John Griffin & Jeff Pinkner; Teleplay by : John Griffin	September 29, 2024
Jade enters the barn to find the mutilated corpse of Tian-Chen and Boyd mumbling hysterically while handcuffed to a pillar until Jade frees him. Jim and Kenny find fresh-grown vegetables near the settlement and take some back to the Township, only for Kenny to learn of his mother's death. Kristi and Jade prepare Tian-Chen's body for a funeral per Kenny's instructions. Fatima faces complications with her pregnancy and seeks medical help at the clinic. Marielle gives her a check-up and finds that she is severely malnourished. Upon returning to Colony House, unable to stomach normal food, Fatima impulsively eats rotten vegetables that satisfy her hunger. In the outside world, Henry shows Tabitha a series of paintings created by Victor's mother Miranda that depict the Township. He mentions that Miranda claimed to see visions and that she was chosen to free the "children in the tower", making Tabitha believe that she was chosen too. After Tian-Chen's funeral, Boyd asks Ellis to help capture one of the creatures to learn more about them. While at home, Jim hears the phone ringing and the voice on the other end claims to be his dead son, Thomas.
23	3	"Mouse Trap"	Jack Bender	Brigitte Hales	October 6, 2024
Jim communicates with the voice over the phone, which taunts him about the safety of his children, causing Jim to become erratic. Tillie discovers Fatima eating rotten vegetables and tries to comfort her concerns about the baby with a tarot card reading but a crow interrupts them by smashing into a window. Kenny leads a small group consisting of Jade, Kristi, and Dale to the settlement to gather more food. Jade becomes paranoid after experiencing visions and attempts to run back to town, even though he wouldn't make it before dark. Kristi tries to stop him but her leg becomes caught in a bear trap until Kenny, Jade, and Dale manage to free her. In the outside world, Tabitha attempts to decipher Miranda's paintings and Henry shows her a replica bottle tree in his backyard, reminiscent of the one found near the Township. Henry reveals that Miranda first started having visions at the location of the original bottle tree, but while driving there they are hit by an oncoming vehicle. Tabitha later awakens in the back of an ambulance alongside an unconscious Henry but a fallen tree soon blocks the ambulance's path.
24	4	"There and Back Again"	Jack Bender	Kristen Layden	October 13, 2024
In the Township, Ethan communicates with the voice over the phone, who tells him that Tabitha will need to be rescued. Victor reveals to Sara that as a child he collected the belongings of the deceased townspeople and tries using them to remember the past. Camping at the settlement, Kenny, Jade, and Kristi reminisce about Tian-Chen and her effect on their lives. Randall agrees to help Boyd capture one of the creatures and tells him that they usually perform the same routines, but were strangely absent that night. The ambulance soon arrives at the Township where the creatures lay a trap and attack, killing the drivers. Dani Acosta, a police officer assigned to the ambulance, is chased by the creatures to Colony House where she accidentally shoots the resident Nicky. Jim and Tabitha reunite and with Boyd's help, they get to Colony House with Henry in the ambulance but are forced to leave Randall behind after he becomes surrounded by the creatures. Despite Marielle's attempts to save her, Nicky succumbs to the gunshot, and Fatima impulsively consumes her blood when alone. After torturing Randall, the creatures leave him alive outside Colony House.
25	5	"The Light of Day"	Alexandra La Roche	Brigitte Hales and John Griffin	October 20, 2024
Randall is brought inside Colony House and angrily accuses Boyd of leaving him to die. Kenny's group returns the following morning, and Kristie is taken to the clinic to recover alongside Randall. Victor becomes distressed after Donna tells him about his father and she later takes Henry to see Victor's room. A town meeting is held at the diner and the majority of townspeople, instigated by Dale, quickly turn against Boyd and demand to be taken to the bottle tree so they can escape as Tabitha did. Acosta later apologizes to Boyd for her actions but he remarks that she only made things worse. Elgin confides in Julie about his visions of the Kimono Woman and they find a polaroid camera. Ellis catches Fatima eating the rotten vegetables and she admits that something is wrong with her baby. Victor and Henry finally see each other and tearfully reunite after forty years apart. Tabitha and Jade discuss their visions of the children at the bottle tree until Dale arrives and goes inside, despite being warned against it. Dale is teleported inside the walls of the Township's empty pool and dies, causing Boyd to berate the townspeople for turning against him.
26	6	"Scar Tissue"	Alexandra La Roche	Kristen Layden & John Griffin	October 27, 2024
Jim and Tabitha argue about their decisions since arriving in the Township and Jim leaves to be alone. The ambulance is emptied of medical supplies and brought to the clinic, including a portable ultrasound machine. Marielle changes Randall's bandages and invites him to stay with her and Kristi so he doesn't have to live alone. Ellis confides in Boyd his concerns about Fatima who allows Kristi to perform an ultrasound scan but they discover that Fatima isn't pregnant. Donna mourns Dale while entombing his body in rocks and Kenny asks to move into Colony House. Despite Victor's insistence to go alone, he and Henry explore the tunnels and find Jasper, a ventriloquist doll belonging to former resident Christopher, but awaken some creatures and quickly flee. Elgin takes photos of the Colony House residents and has a vision of the Kimono Woman who claims she can help everyone go home. Jade discovers a second bottle tree where he sees a vision of Tom and discovers that the bottles from both trees contain the same numbers. Tabitha asks Jade if she and Ethan can help but finds that Jade's drawings of the settlement are similar to a recurring nightmare she had as a child.
27	7	"These Fragile Lives"	Bruce McDonald	Story by : John Griffin & Jeff Pinkner; Teleplay by : John Griffin	November 3, 2024
Fatima confesses her cravings to Kristi, who believes she is experiencing a psychosomatic pregnancy. Fatima argues that her pregnancy is real and that her cravings are getting stronger. Worried that Fatima might threaten Colony House, Donna tells Boyd that she must leave. Victor becomes obsessed with getting Jasper to talk, concerning Henry, and visits Sara for help. Elgin's camera produces a polaroid of the cellar, which he investigates and finds a hidden door with a corpse behind it. Acosta questions Kenny about the nature of the Township and expresses her distrust of Boyd. She then breaks into the sheriff's station to retrieve her gun and argues with Boyd, who gives her gun back unloaded. Jade, Tabitha, and Ethan travel to the settlement where Jim is gathering food. They find the painted rocks from Tabitha's nightmares and Jade theorizes that she was destined to find the Township. Randall begins teaching Julie to drive until they find the ruins previously discovered by Boyd. Ellis tells Tillie that he is afraid of losing Fatima, and she promises to help. Fatima later experiences intense pain at the greenhouse and is comforted by Tillie but quickly loses control and stabs Tillie, killing her.
28	8	"Thresholds"	Bruce McDonald	Story by : John Griffin & Jeff Pinkner; Teleplay by : John Griffin	November 10, 2024
Boyd takes Fatima to an empty cabin and feigns his knowledge surrounding Tillie's death after her body is discovered. While Acosta and Kenny start questioning everyone, Donna and many other residents accuse Sara. While alone, Fatima has a vision of the Kimono Woman. Jim angrily confronts Jade at the bar about bringing Tabitha to the settlement and a hungover Henry uses his past experiences to help Jim calm down. Julie and Ethan explore the ruins where she has a vision of the dungeon where Martin gets her to save Boyd from the mineshaft but experiences a seizure. Sara and Tabitha help Victor, who remembers the day he saw Jasper talk, only to realize that Christopher was speaking to the Boy in White who explained the origins of the bottle tree, which inadvertently led to Miranda's death after Victor told her. Boyd informs Donna that Fatima killed Tillie, who tries to make him and Ellis understand that Fatima has become too dangerous. Elgin follows visual instructions from Polaroids produced by his camera and soon finds the cabin which Boyd and Ellis later find empty. Elgin secretly leads Fatima to the cellar and traps her behind the hidden door.
29	9	"Revelations: Chapter One"	Jack Bender	Story by : John Griffin & Jeff Pinkner; Teleplay by : John Griffin	November 17, 2024
Boyd and Ellis start searching for Fatima until Boyd has a freezing episode and is forced to stop. Elgin feeds Fatima his blood which she hungrily accepts, causing her pregnancy to progress rapidly. Blaming himself for getting his mother killed, Victor goes to chop down the bottle tree but the Boy in White stops him. Sara hears the voices in her mind and explains to Boyd that the voices claim that Fatima has little time left. Knowing how much she means to the residents of the Township, Donna calls a town meeting at the newly reopened diner and everyone splits off into pairs to find Fatima. Boyd tells Kenny that his Parkinson's has progressed and that Kenny needs to be ready to take over leadership. Elgin tries to convince Ellis that Fatima's disappearance is a good thing, making Ellis suspicious of him. Still trapped, Fatima finds a hidden hatch on the floor but the Kimono Woman appears and holds Fatima down to keep her quiet. Tabitha has a vision of one of the children who she and Julie follow to the cellar. They find Victor inside and Tabitha has a vision of Miranda's death and becomes distressed.
30	10	"Revelations: Chapter Two"	Jack Bender	Story by : John Griffin & Jeff Pinkner; Teleplay by : John Griffin	November 24, 2024
Ellis realizes Elgin knows where Fatima is, so Boyd confines and interrogates him at Colony House. Elgin admits he has been communicating with a mysterious Kimono Woman and believes Fatima's baby will set them free. Victor takes Henry to Miranda's grave and expresses guilt over her death. Boyd violently interrogates Elgin, later joined by Sara, who forces him to reveal Fatima's location. The Kimono Woman helps Fatima give birth, then disappears with the amniotic sac as Boyd and Ellis arrive. Fatima explains the creatures were once the town's first residents who gained immortality by sacrificing their children. Boyd descends into a hatch and witnesses Smiley being reborn. Elsewhere, Jim, Tabitha, and Jade discover the bottle tree numbers are musical notes; playing them summons children who trigger memories of past lives, revealing Tabitha and Jade once died as Miranda and Christopher trying to save them. Jim then encounters Julie before a man in a yellow suit appears and rips his throat.

=== Season 4 (2026) ===
No. overall	No. in season	Title	Directed by	Written by	Original release date
31	1	"The Arrival"	Jack Bender	Story by : John Griffin & Jeff Pinkner; Teleplay by : John Griffin	April 19, 2026
After ripping out Jim's throat, the Man in Yellow warns Julie that she cannot change the past no matter how hard she tries, and Julie disappears; Jim dies as the Man in Yellow laments that he won't see what awaits people. A lone pastor finds the fallen tree on the road. Jade suggests Tabitha to tell the people about their discovery, but Tabitha refuses, doubting its reality. Kenny goes to find Boyd at the caves, and they both encounter Smiley. As Boyd explains to Kenny that this is what Fatima gave birth to, the pastor's car crashes into the sheriff station, now accompanied by a woman named Sophia. Boyd completely loses hope, though Kristi and Ellis try to mold him into the leader the people need. That night, while waiting for Jim to return, Tabitha, Julie, and Ethan see things moving erratically in the kitchen. While Kenny sleeps, Sophia visits the unconscious pastor and reveals that she is actually the Man in Yellow, disguised to deceive him and blend in with the townspeople. She then suffocates the pastor to death.
32	2	"Fray"	Jack Bender	Story by : John Griffin & Jeff Pinkner; Teleplay by : John Griffin	April 26, 2026
In the morning, Julie and Ethan discover Jim's body hanging in the barn with the phrase "knowledge comes at a cost", leaving them and Tabitha devastated. Jade tells Boyd about the discovery that they must save the children, which is why Jim died, and Boyd theorizes that when they discover things, the town pushes them away to prevent further discoveries. Jade tells Tabitha that Jim's death proves what they discovered is real, but an enraged Tabitha says he should have been the one to die. Sophia, looking for new glasses, tells Sara that keeping the belongings of the dead is a way to remember them. Julie asks Randall for help when she travels back in time using ruins and travels to the night the cicadas attacked Randall, but when a creature is about to kill her, Randall brings her back to the present. Boyd arrests Acosta for stealing the ambulance, which she thought she could use to leave town. Ethan leaves home and goes to the RV, where he sees a vision of Jim, who tells him that the Lake of Tears in his vision is real and that he must find it.
33	3	"Merrily We Go"	Alexandra La Roche	John Griffin & Kristen Layden	May 3, 2026
During Jim and the pastor's funeral, a flock of crows appears, unsettling the townspeople. At the diner, Sophia tells Julie that things started going downhill in town when her family arrived, which infuriates her. Ethan and Victor embark on a quest for the Lake of Tears and are joined by Jade, who is trying to recall his past lives. Along the way, Victor sees the Man in Yellow's clothes and is terrified. Randall helps Julie retrieve Ethan's books from the collapsed house to learn more about her ability of "story-walking". Tabitha and Henry go to the bottle tree, with Tabitha hoping to return to the lighthouse, but the Boy in White appears and tells her that she can no longer return that way and that they are running out of time. Boyd tasks Acosta with creating a crime scene using objects from the dead in case she discovers anything that could help people escape. While Henry comforts the terrified Victor, Jade discovers hallucinogenic mushrooms that could help him remember.
34	4	"Of Myths and Monsters"	Alexandra La Roche	John Griffin & Kristen Layden	May 10, 2026
Jade and Henry tell Boyd about the discovery of the Man in Yellow's clothes, and Henry decides to ask Victor what he knows about him. Kenny finds Fatima in her room shaping a large amount of dirt, and she explains to him and Boyd that she is creating a golem to protect herself from Smiley, to whom she feels a strange connection. Julie discovers a theory in Ethan's books claiming that marking a place would allow her to revisit that moment. She travels back to when Victor was a child and sees the Man in Yellow, but when he is about to attack her, Randall pulls her back to the present and realizes the theory did not work as intended. Later, Victor tells Henry that the Man in Yellow arrived like everyone else and lived among the residents until, after they died, he began devouring them, including Miranda. Sophia tests Sara by giving her a task through the voices, which Sara eventually obeys. A foraging party including Tabitha, Ethan, Donna, Ellis, and others reaches the settlement to gather food and notices something floating in the lake.
35	5	"What a Long Strange Trip It's Been"	Jack Bender	John Griffin & Brigitte Hales	May 17, 2026
As the mushrooms begin affecting Jade, he asks Boyd to help him separate visions from physical reality. The foraging group retrieves enormous straw dolls from the lake but returns them as a precaution. Later, Jade sees visions, drinks blood from a skull to recover memories, and sees previous incarnations of himself, learning they were killed by residents after discovering his connection to the children. He also finds a tunnel leading to the place where the children were sacrificed and comes to believe he knows how to save them. Henry breaks down after learning the truth about Miranda's death. Marielle relives her dungeon experience through vivid visions and fears that something ancient will never release them, even after death. Tabitha remembers the dolls belonged to a girl, who was one of her past incarnations, that they were thrown into the lake by a man whose nightmares brought them to life. The dolls attack the group and kill Roger. Tabitha recalls how to kill the dolls using a sharpened totem and saves Donna.
36	6	"The Heart Is a Lonely Hunter"	Jack Bender	John Griffin & Sophie Owens-Bender	May 31, 2026
Jade tells Boyd they must find the children's bones, convinced it is necessary to save them, but Boyd is reluctant because of the danger. Trying to confirm that his visions were real, Jade searches Colony House's basement for a door but cannot find it. Victor agrees to guide Boyd and Kenny to the Man in Yellow's car so they can learn more about him, but Donna interrupts to direct Boyd and Kenny's attention to Roger's corpse, which now has eyes and a mouth like the dolls, and also explains how Tabitha managed to kill one of them. As they discuss the possibility that people's fears become part of the place, Donna becomes distressed and suffers a heart attack; Boyd saves her life and Kristi stabilizes her condition. Sophia manipulates Henry into drinking and secretly adds a drop of her blood to his liquor after wounding herself. After Donna wakes up, Boyd, fearing the many more possible threats that may be in the place, breaks down the basement wall, discovers the hidden door, and agrees to move forward with a plan.
37	7	"Best Laid Plans"	Jeff Renfroe	John Griffin & Brigitte Hales	June 7, 2026
Tabitha tells Julie and Ethan she is Miranda's reincarnation, while Boyd tells Victor and Henry the same, upsetting Henry. Jade informs the townspeople about his and Tabitha's past lives and the need to save the sacrificed children, but they are skeptical. Boyd plans to use one of the totems that was effective with the straw dolls against the creatures. Victor takes Tabitha and Ethan to the Man in Yellow's car, where he finds a sack of teeth and becomes distressed, fearing history may be repeating itself because, like Miranda, Tabitha arrived with a son and daughter and the Man in Yellow has returned, implying Ethan may end up alone as Victor once was. Henry experiences vivid visions of waking in the real world after a coma. Kenny stabs a creature with the totem but it has no effect and he is cornered by Smiley, until Fatima manages to control him and Kenny reaches safety. Sophia reanimates Roger as a creature, who attacks Colony House, but Elgin kills him with another totem.
38	8	"Heavy Is the Head"	Jeff Renfroe	Story by : John Griffin & Jeff Pinkner; Teleplay by : John Griffin	June 14, 2026
Fatima tells Boyd, Donna and Ellis that she saved Kenny by controlling Smiley and reveals markings on her body similar to those of the creatures; Fatima fears becoming one of them, but later believes that her ability could be helpful. Ethan asks Victor to help him prepare in case he ends up alone, but Tabitha reassures them that she will get them out. Boyd rejects Jade's plan to reach the children's burial chamber and escape by cutting down the bottle tree above it, arguing it's too dangerous because they rely on a single route with no backup. Boyd sees a vision of Khatri, who tells him that some people may have to die in order to escape. Henry begins to believe in his own visions, thinking that the town might be something he created in his mind. Kristi takes Fatima's pulse and discovers that she should be clinically dead. The Man in Yellow lures Tabitha into the woods and warns her that acting on the theory about the children's bones could unleash unimaginable suffering if they are wrong.
39	9	"The Calm Before"	Jack Bender	John Griffin & P. J. Yerman	June 21, 2026
Tabitha tells Boyd about her encounter with the Man in Yellow and that he was the one who killed Jim, prompting Boyd to proceed with Jade's plan. Sophia reveals her identity to town member Clara and reminds her about a deal they made. Henry struggles with whether to remain in his vision, which would require him to kill Victor. Julie remains skeptical of Tabitha's past lives and believes the place is deceiving them. Clara gives Fatima the Man in Yellow's blood to drink. The Boy in White warns Victor against the plan to cut down the bottle tree, and Victor confronts Boyd, who handcuffs him and sends him to the sheriff's station with Kenny. Tabitha convinces Boyd that she and Jade must be the ones to unearth the bones, believing it was their destiny from the start. Elgin finds an old photo of Sophia and, upon showing it to her, she orders Clara to lock the diner's door with them inside. Boyd's team prepares to cut down the bottle tree, while Jade and Tabitha find the children's bones as several creatures approach the chamber.
40	10	"If a Tree Falls in the Forest..."	Jack Bender	Story by : John Griffin & Jeff Pinkner; Teleplay by : John Griffin	June 28, 2026
Jade tells Tabitha to escape with the bones while he stays behind to buy her time. As the creatures enter the chamber, Boyd's group uproots the bottle tree and lets a ladder down into the cave. Tabitha climbs, but the ladder breaks before she reaches the top. After uprooting the bottle tree, darkness falls and an earthquake occurs. Jade and Tabitha flee through the caves but become trapped. Smiley enters the clinic thanks to a fallen talisman and fatally wounds Marielle, who shortly after dies in Kristi's arms. Sophia tells Elgin that their cycle is ending and, when he refuses to make a deal, she kills him. Sophia and Clara later collect the town's talismans. Henry prepares to kill Victor based on his vision, but Victor subdues him when Ethan appears. Boyd returns to the tunnels with Fatima, who can sense the creatures, and Ellis, and they rescue Jade and Tabitha; Fatima transforms into a creature to allow the group to escape. The Boy in White tells Sophia she will finally lose, before she throws the talismans into a farway tree.

=== Season 5 ===
The season is expected to premiere in 2027. Jack Bender will return to direct episodes for the season.
