= No One Would Tell (2018 film) =

- Poster
- Written by: Caitlin D. Fryers
- Directed by: Gail Harvey
- Starring: Shannen Doherty; Matreya Scarrwener; Callan Potter; Chanelle Peloso; Louriza Tronco; Trezzo Mahoro; Ricky He; Sarah Grey; Ona Grauer; Avery Konrad; Mira Sorvino
- Countries of origin: United States; Canada
- Original language: English

Production
- Executive producers: Martin Fisher; Lisa Richardson; Danielle von Zerneck
- Producers: Shawn Angelski; Paddy Bickerton
- Running time: 90 minutes

Original release
- Network: Lifetime
- Release: September 16, 2018

No One Would Tell is a 2018 made-for-tv movie that aired on Lifetime. It is a remake of the 1996 film of the same name. It features Matreya Scarrwener, Shannen Doherty, Callan Potter, Chanelle Peloso, Louriza Tronco, Trezzo Mahoro, Ricky He, Sarah Grey, Ona Grauer, Avery Konrad, and Mira Sorvino.

The plot, like the original film, is based on the true story of Jamie Fuller, a 16-year-old high school student who murdered his 14-year-old ex girlfriend, Amy Carnevale, on August 23, 1991, in Beverly, Massachusetts.

== Plot ==
At a school wrestling match, 16-year-old student Sarah Collins catches the attention of 18-year-old classmate Rob Tennison, and they start dating. Though their relationship goes well at first, Rob quickly becomes jealous and controlling. He angrily throws her phone at her and breaks it during an argument, furiously accuses her of ignoring him in favor of her best friend Nikki Farrow, and demands that she lose weight when he buys her an expensive dress that does not fit. Sarah confides in her mother, Laura, about Rob's possessive behavior, but Laura suggests that he is simply afraid of losing her.

At school, Sarah's friend Alexa notices bruising on Sarah's shoulder, but does not ask about it, instead helping her hide it with hair and makeup. Later that day, Rob berates Sarah in the hallway for wearing a revealing outfit. Sarah later visits his house to apologize, and is greeted by his mother. Rob later accuses her of orchestrating the visit so she could meet his mother without his knowledge, subsequently punching her so hard she collapses. She breaks up with him and demands that he never speak to her again.

At home, Laura reveals that her own boyfriend broke up with her. Sarah prepares to confide the truth about her relationship with Rob, but Laura takes a work call before she can, and Sarah retreats to her room. Laura notices Sarah's injuries, but Sarah lies and says she fell, then lashes out at Laura for insinuating that Rob is abusive. She reconciles with Rob after he promises to stop abusing her and gifts her a promise ring.

When Nikki urges Sarah to break up with Rob, Sarah angrily ends their friendship. Nikki consults Rob's ex-girlfriend, who describes the abuse she suffered at Rob's hands, which she never reported out of shame. She advises Nikki to be present for Sarah.

Nikki and Sarah reconcile at the dance. Rob drags Sarah outside after noticing her speaking to another boy, but Nikki, along with her boyfriend Gus, intervenes. With Nikki's support, Sarah breaks up with Rob for good.

The following day, Sarah ignores Rob's attempts to contact her until he eventually gets her friend Jacqueline to convince her to converse with him. She reluctantly lets him give her a ride home, but once in the car, he reveals he is not taking her home.

The next day, Sarah is missing. Nikki finally tells a distraught Laura that Rob has been abusing Sarah, though he denies it upon being questioned by her. She and Nikki later find Sarah's ring at Rob's family's lake house, and a police search team finds her body in the lake.

Rob is charged with first-degree murder. At the trial, Laura implores Nikki not to blame herself and urges the court to look into Rob's actions, revealing that he asphyxiated her during an argument. Judge Elizabeth Hanover reads the guilty verdict, and tells the witnesses to speak up the next time they witness a friend being abused. A memorial for Sarah is created in the school hallway. Nikki and Laura console one another in Sarah's room.

== Cast ==
- Matreya Scarrwener as Sarah Collins
- Shannen Doherty as Laura Collins
- Callan Potter as Rob Tennison
- Chanelle Peloso as Nikki Farrow
- Mira Sorvino as Judge Elizabeth Hanover
- Louriza Tronco as Alexa
- Trezzo Mahoro as Zack
- Ricky He as Gus
- Sarah Grey as Jacqueline
- Ona Grauer as Mrs. Tennison
- Avery Konrad as Kara Lovett
- Brendan O'Brien as Mr. Tennison
- Bob Frazer as Prosecutor
- Garfield Wilson as Detective Anderson

== Production ==
Danielle von Zerneck, Lisa Richardson, and Martin Fisher served as executive producers with Canadians Shawn Angelski and Paddy Bickerton serving as producers on the film. Gail Harvey directed from a script written by Caitlin D. Fryers.

Lifetime announced the film as part of a fall movie lineup focused on young adults, and tackling a number of social and mental health issues. The announced cast included Shannen Doherty as "Laura" Collins, Matreya Scarrwener as "Sarah" Collins, and Callan Potter as "Rob" Tennison.

== Reception ==
As a remake of the 1996 film, the film was fairly well-received, ranking ninth out of the Top 150 cable shows when it premiered on Sunday, September 16, 2018.

Harvey won the Canadian Screen Award for Best Direction in a TV Movie at the 8th Canadian Screen Awards in 2020.
