= 7th Canadian Screen Awards =

7th year of awards given by the Academy of Canadian Cinema & Television

- Date: March 31, 2019
- Location: Sony Centre for the Performing Arts; Toronto, Ontario
- Hosted by: None

Highlights
- Most awards: The Great Darkened Days (film), Anne with an E, Cardinal (television)
- Best Motion Picture: A Colony
- Best Dramatic Series: Anne with an E
- Best Comedy Series: Schitt's Creek

Television/radio coverage
- Network: CBC

The 7th Canadian Screen Awards were presented by the Academy of Canadian Cinema and Television on March 31, 2019, to honour achievements in Canadian film, television, and digital media production in 2018.

Nominations were announced by the Academy on February 7, 2019. Early coverage of the nominations highlighted the fact that the Best Picture category consisted entirely of French-language films from Quebec, with not a single English-language film named in the category. This was also the first year that the ceremony did not have a host.

== Ceremony ==
The awards in many of the technical and craft categories were presented in a series of advance Canadian Screen Week galas in the week before the main ceremony. The gala for non-fiction programming was held on March 26, the gala for creative fiction storytelling was held on March 27, the gala for digital production was held on March 28, and the gala for film craft categories was held in the afternoon of March 31.

The broadcast ceremony had no overall host, with the academy clarifying that the decision was made before the Academy Awards made the same announcement. The ceremony did, however, included pretaped comedy segments from performers such as the casts of Baroness von Sketch Show and Letterkenny, as well as a short welcome introduction by actor Andrew Phung and drag queen Tynomi Banks.

In film, The Great Darkened Days (La grande noirceur) was the year's big winner with five awards, although the Best Picture award went to A Colony (Une colonie). In television, the drama series Anne with an E and Cardinal tied for the most wins, with seven awards each.

== Special awards ==
The first recipients of the academy's special awards were announced on January 15.

- Board of Directors Award: Kevin Tierney, Elizabeth Klinck, Carole Vivier, Roman Bittman
- Margaret Collier Award: Brad Wright
- Industry Leadership Award: Entertainment One
- Lifetime Achievement Award: Deepa Mehta
- Radius Award: Stephan James
- Earle Grey Award: Mary Walsh
- Academy Icon Award: The Kids in the Hall

== Film ==
Motion Picture	Direction
A Colony (Une colonie) – Fanny Drew, Sarah Mannering; Family First (Chien de garde) – Étienne Hansez; Genesis (Genèse) – Galilé Marion-Gauvin; The Great Darkened Days (La grande noirceur) – Sylvain Corbeil, Nancy Grant; Just a Breath Away (Dans la brume) – Christian Larouche, Guillaume Colboc, Nicolas Duval Adassovsky	Jasmin Mozaffari, Firecrackers; Geneviève Dulude-De Celles, A Colony (Une colonie); Sophie Dupuis, Family First (Chien de garde); Maxime Giroux, The Great Darkened Days (La grande noirceur); Daniel Roby, Just a Breath Away (Dans la brume)
Actor in a leading role	Actress in a leading role
Théodore Pellerin, Family First (Chien de garde); Martin Dubreuil, The Great Darkened Days (La grande noirceur); Paul Nutarariaq, The Grizzlies; Brandon Oakes, Through Black Spruce; Michael Rowe, Crown and Anchor	Émilie Bierre, A Colony (Une colonie); Valeria Henríquez, The Padre; Rose-Marie Perreault, Fake Tattoos (Les faux tatouages); Brigitte Poupart, Les Salopes, or the Naturally Wanton Pleasure of Skin (Les salopes ou le sucre naturel de la peau); Carla Turcotte, Sashinka
Actor in a supporting role	Actress in a supporting role
Richard Clarkin, The Drawer Boy; Paul Ahmarani, Genesis (Genèse); Paul Doucet, With Love (L'Amour); Michel Robin, Just a Breath Away (Dans la brume); Jacob Whiteduck-Lavoie, A Colony (Une colonie)	Sarah Gadon, The Great Darkened Days (La grande noirceur); Irlande Côté, A Colony (Une colonie); Romane Denis, Slut in a Good Way (Charlotte a du fun); Anna Lambe, The Grizzlies; Kate Moyer, Our House
Original Screenplay	Adapted Screenplay
Catherine Léger, Slut in a Good Way (Charlotte a du fun); Renée Beaulieu, Les Salopes, or the Naturally Wanton Pleasure of Skin (Les salopes ou le sucre naturel de la peau); Marc Bisaillon, With Love (L'Amour); Philippe Lesage, Genesis (Genèse); Guillaume Lemans, Just a Breath Away (Dans la brume)	Robert Budreau, Stockholm; Sharon Lewis, Brown Girl Begins; Nathan Parker, Our House; Arturo Pérez Torres, The Drawer Boy; Paul Risacher, Claude Landry and Maxime Landry, Racetime (La Course des tuques)
Feature Length Documentary	Short Documentary
Anthropocene: The Human Epoch – Jennifer Baichwal, Nicholas de Pencier, Edward Burtynsky; The Devil's Share (La Part du diable) – Colette Loumède, Luc Bourdon; Immaculate Memories: The Uncluttered Worlds of Christopher Pratt – Kenneth J. Harvey; Letter from Masanjia – Leon Lee; What Walaa Wants – Christy Garland, Matt Code, Anne Köhncke, Justine Pimlott, Anita Lee	My Dead Dad's Porno Tapes – Charlie Tyrell; Bonfires – Martin Bureau; On My Way Out: The Secret Life of Nani and Popi – Barry Avrich, Howie Mandel, Brandon Gross, Skyler Gross; Prince's Tale – Jamie Miller; Voices of Kidnapping – Ryan McKenna
Live Action Short Drama	Animated Short
Fauve – Jérémy Comte, Maria Gracia Turgeon, Evren Boisjoli; The Colour of Your Lips (La couleur de tes lèvres) – Annick Blanc, Maria Gracia Turgeon; The Fish and the Sea – Phillip Thomas; For Nonna Anna – Luis De Filippis; Mahalia Melts in the Rain – Émilie Mannering, Carmine Pierre-Dufour, Sarah Mannering, Fanny Drew	Animal Behaviour – Alison Snowden, David Fine, Michael Fukushima; Biidaaban (The Dawn Comes) – Amanda Strong; Caterpillarplasty – David Barlow-Krelina, Jelena Popović; The Subject (Le sujet) – Patrick Bouchard, Julie Roy; A Visit (Une visite) – Parissa Mohit
Art Direction/Production Design	Cinematography
Patricia McNeil and Sylvain Dion, The Great Darkened Days (La grande noirceur); Emmanuel Fréchette, The Hummingbird Project; Marie-Claude Gosselin, For Those Who Don't Read Me (À tous ceux qui ne me lisent pas); Iñigo Navarro, The Padre; Elisa Sauve, Octavio Is Dead!	Sara Mishara, The Great Darkened Days (La grande noirceur); Daniel Grant, Octavio Is Dead!; Ian Lagarde, For Those Who Don't Read Me (À tous ceux qui ne me lisent pas); Sara Mishara, Allure; Paul Sarossy, The Padre
Costume Design	Editing
Patricia McNeil, The Great Darkened Days (La grande noirceur); Lea Carlson, Stockholm; Eugénie Clermont, A Colony (Une colonie); Hanna Puley, Octavio Is Dead!; Mara Zigler, Firecrackers	Simone Smith, Firecrackers; Richard Comeau, Stockholm; Elric Robichon, For Those Who Don't Read Me (À tous ceux qui ne me lisent pas); Jules Saulnier, Sashinka; Arthur Tarnowski and Nicolas Chaudeurge, The Hummingbird Project
Overall Sound	Sound Editing
Pierre Mertens, Thomas Gauder and Alexis Oscari, The Hummingbird Project; Michel Lecoufle, 1991; Stéphane Barsalou and Bernard Gariépy Strobl, With Love (L'Amour); Gilles Corbeil and Stéphane Bergeron, The Fireflies Are Gone (La disparition des lucioles); Bernard Gariépy Strobl, Just a Breath Away (Dans la brume)	Frédéric Cloutier, The Great Darkened Days (La grande noirceur); Louis Desparois, The Nest (Le nid); Martin Pinsonnault, Just a Breath Away (Dans la brume); Christian Rivest, Stéphane Bergeron and Guy Pelletier, Racetime (La Course des tuques); Lee Walpole and Thomas Huhn, Stockholm
Achievement in Music: Original Score	Achievement in Music: Original Song
Alaska B, Through Black Spruce; Olivier Alary, Allure; Philippe Brault, The Fireflies Are Gone (La disparition des lucioles); Naren Chandavarkar and Benedict Taylor, Black Kite; Yves Gourmeur, The Hummingbird Project	Dan General, Thomas Lambe and Adam Tanuyak, "Trials" – The Grizzlies; Sook-Yin Lee, Adam Litovitz and Alia O'Brien, "Ghost of Love (Onakabazien Remix)" – Octavio Is Dead!; Jean-Sébastien Williams, "Help Is on the Way" – Sashinka
Makeup	Hair
Françoise Quilichini, Just a Breath Away (Dans la brume); Lauryn Ford, Crown and Anchor; Carla Hutchinson, Brown Girl Begins; Tammy-Lou Pate, Venus; Fanny Vachon, The Fall of Sparta (La chute de Sparte)	Peggy Kyriakidou, Stockholm; Renée Chan, Love Jacked; Daniel Jacob, 1991; Anne Moralis, André Duval, The Hummingbird Project; Johanne Paiement, Slut in a Good Way (Charlotte a du fun)
Best Cinematography in a Documentary	Best Editing in a Documentary
Nicholas de Pencier, Anthropocene: The Human Epoch; Nicolas Canniccioni, First Stripes (Premières armes); Christy Garland, What Walaa Wants; Étienne Roussy, The Other Rio (L'autre Rio); Matthieu Rytz, Anote's Ark	Michel Giroux, The Devil's Share (La Part du diable); Michael Aaglund and Graeme Ring, What Walaa Wants; Dave Kazala, Dolphin Man; Rich Williamson, Take Light; Graham Withers, Transformer
Visual Effects	John Dunning Best First Feature Award
Benoit Brière and Bruno Maillard, Just a Breath Away (Dans la brume); William Chang and Brian Huynh, Our House; Philippe Frère, Stéphane Thibert, Alexandre Rouil, Véronique Dessard, Loïc Poës, Barthélémy Beaux, Morgan Hardy, Bernard Devillers and Gaël Durant, The Hummingbird Project; Fredrik Nord, Stockholm; Jean-François Talbot and Jean-Pierre Boies, 1991	A Colony (Une colonie) – Geneviève Dulude-De Celles; Family First (Chien de garde) – Sophie Dupuis; Firecrackers – Jasmin Mozaffari; The Nest (Le nid) – David Paradis; Touched – Karl R. Hearne
Special awards	
Golden Screen Award: 1991 – Ricardo Trogi

== Television ==
=== Programs ===
Drama series	Comedy series
Anne with an E; Bad Blood; Blood and Water; Frankie Drake Mysteries; Vikings	Schitt's Creek; Letterkenny; Mr. D; Second Jen; Workin' Moms
Animated program or series	Documentary program
PAW Patrol; Cloudy with a Chance of Meatballs; Corner Gas Animated; Hotel Transylvania: The Series; The Magic School Bus Rides Again	You Are Here; Love, Hope and Autism; After the Sirens; Fox Chaser; The Fruit Machine
Children's or youth fiction	Children's or youth non-fiction
Odd Squad; Backstage; The Next Step; ReBoot: The Guardian Code	Science Max; Finding Stuff Out; Just Like Mom and Dad; When I Grow Up!
Limited Series or Program	History Documentary Program or Series
Cardinal: Blackfly Season; Caught; The Indian Detective; Second Opinion	The Nature of Things: "Ice Bridge"; 100 Days to Victory; Prosecuting Evil: The Extraordinary World of Ben Ferencz; 1491: The Untold Story of the Americas Before Columbus
Lifestyle Program or Series	Biography or Arts Documentary Program or Series
Property Brothers; Built for the Weekend; Carnival Eats; Home to Win; Where to I Do?	The Nature of Things: "Jumbo: The Life of an Elephant Superstar"; Dreaming of a Jewish Christmas; Inseparable: Ten Years Joined at the Head; Interrupt This Program; Rebels on Pointe
Pre-School Program or Series	Reality/Competition Program or Series
Dino Dana; The Cat in the Hat Knows a Lot About That!; Ranger Rob; Rusty Rivets; Studio K	The Amazing Race Canada; Big Brother Canada; Canada's Smartest Person Junior; Knock Knock Ghost; MasterChef Canada
Science or Nature Documentary Program or Series (Rob Stewart Award)	Social/Political Documentary Program (Donald Brittain Award)
The Nature of Things: "Equus: Story of the Horse"; The Nature of Things: "Into the Fire"; The Nature of Things: "The Kingdom: How Fungi Made Our World"; The Nature of Things: "Mommy Wildest"; Over the Horizon	Quiet Killing (Ce silence qui tue); Driving with Selvi; The Heat: A Kitchen (R)evolution; The Way Out
Factual Program or Series	Live entertainment special
The Detectives; Employable Me; First Contact; Political Blind Date; Still Standing	2018 Juno Awards; Harry and Meghan: The Royal Wedding; 2018 iHeartRadio MMVAs; 2017 Scotiabank Giller Prize
Variety or entertainment special	Talk program or series
Gord Downie's Secret Path in Concert; Air Farce New Year's Eve 2017; Songs & Stories: Jann Arden; Tower of Song: A Memorial Tribute to Leonard Cohen; We Day	The Filmmakers; Breakfast Television; The Marilyn Denis Show; The Social
Golden Screen Awards
Fiction: The Indian Detective; Reality: The Amazing Race Canada

=== Acting ===
Lead actor, drama	Lead actress, drama
Kim Coates, Bad Blood; Aaron Ashmore, Killjoys; Yannick Bisson, Murdoch Mysteries; Eric McCormack, Travelers; Jerry O'Connell, Carter	Amybeth McNulty, Anne with an E; Wendy Crewson, The Detail; Caroline Dhavernas, Mary Kills People; Kristin Kreuk, Burden of Truth; Melanie Scrofano, Wynonna Earp
Lead actor, comedy	Lead actress, comedy
Jared Keeso, Letterkenny; Gerry Dee, Mr. D; Dan Levy, Schitt's Creek; Eugene Levy, Schitt's Creek; Jason Priestley, Private Eyes	Catherine O'Hara, Schitt's Creek; Dani Kind, Workin' Moms; Annie Murphy, Schitt's Creek; Catherine Reitman, Workin' Moms; Cindy Sampson, Private Eyes
Lead actor, drama program or limited series	Lead actress, drama program or limited series
Billy Campbell, Cardinal: Blackfly Season; Fab Filippo, Save Me; Allan Hawco, Caught; Mark McKinney, A Christmas Fury	Karine Vanasse, Cardinal: Blackfly Season; Tori Anderson, Caught; Amy Matysio, Save Me; Mary Walsh, A Christmas Fury
Supporting actor, drama	Supporting actress, drama
R. H. Thomson, Anne with an E; Salvatore Antonio, Mary Kills People; Brent Carver, Save Me; Louis Ferreira, Bad Blood; Dan Petronijevic, Cardinal: Blackfly Season	Geraldine James, Anne with an E; Selena Lee, Blood and Water; Sharron Matthews, Frankie Drake Mysteries; Chanelle Peloso, The Bletchley Circle: San Francisco; Mackenzie Porter, Travelers
Supporting actor, comedy	Supporting actress, comedy
Noah Reid, Schitt's Creek; Chris Elliott, Schitt's Creek; Ennis Esmer, Private Eyes; Peter Keleghan, Workin' Moms; Colin Mochrie, Tiny Plastic Men	Emily Hampshire, Schitt's Creek; Jann Arden, Workin' Moms; Amanda Brugel, Workin' Moms; Jennifer Robertson, Schitt's Creek; Mary Walsh, Little Dog
Performance in a children's or youth program or series	Performance in a guest role, drama series
Anna Cathcart, Odd Squad; Saara Chaudry, Dino Dana; Millie Davis, Odd Squad; Isaac Kragten, Odd Squad; Michela Luci, Dino Dana	Karen Robinson, Mary Kills People; Dalmar Abuzeid, Anne with an E; Enrico Colantoni, Travelers; Shawn Doyle, Ransom; Rebecca Liddiard, The Detail
Performance in an animated program or series	Ensemble performance in a variety or sketch comedy program or series
Martin Short, The Cat in the Hat Knows a Lot About That!; Clé Bennett, Cloudy with a Chance of Meatballs; Sean Cullen, Cloudy with a Chance of Meatballs; Bryn McAuley, Hotel Transylvania: The Series; Bryn McAuley, Top Wing	Baroness von Sketch Show; Caution: May Contain Nuts; This Hour Has 22 Minutes

=== News and information ===
National newscast	Local newscast
CTV National News; CBC News: The National; Global National	CTV News Toronto at 6; CBC News Toronto at 6; CityNews; CTV News Vancouver at 6
News or information series	News special
The Fifth Estate; APTN Investigates; Marketplace; W5	#CityVote: The Debate (City Toronto); CBC News: Ontario Votes (CBC Toronto); CBC News: Vigil for Humboldt (CBC News); CTV News: Toronto Election 2018 (CTV Toronto)
News anchor, national	News anchor, local
Dawna Friesen, Global National; Adrienne Arsenault, Rosemary Barton, Andrew Chang and Ian Hanomansing, The National; Heather Hiscox, CBC News: Morning Live; Lisa LaFlamme, CTV National News	Michelle Dubé, CTV News Toronto at 6; Debra Arbec, CBC Montreal News at Six; Dwight Drummond, CBC Toronto News at Six; Tom Murphy and Amy Smith, CBC Nova Scotia News at Six; Ken Shaw, CTV News Toronto at 6
News reporter, national	News reporter, local
Paul Hunter, The National; Nahlah Ayed, The National; Margaret Evans, The National; Daniele Hamamdjian, CTV National News; Erica Johnson, The National	Katie Nicholson, CBC Winnipeg News at Six; Tamara Cherry, CTV News Toronto at 6; Mike Crawley, CBC Toronto News at Six; Simon Nakonechny, CBC Montreal News at 6; Paul Withers, CBC Nova Scotia News
Host or interviewer, news or information program or series	News or information program
Adrienne Arsenault, CBC News: The National; Asha Tomlinson, Marketplace; Rosemary Barton, CBC News: The National; Wendy Mesley, The Weekly with Wendy Mesley; Steve Paikin, The Agenda	Marketplace: "Fake Degrees"; The Fifth Estate: "The Mystery of the Sherman Murders"; Marketplace: "Crying Out for Care"; W5: "No Witnesses"; W5: "Unconquered"
News or information segment	Host in a program or series
Brenda Witmer, Adrienne Arsenault, Michelle Gagnon, Lindsay Rempel, Ghalia Bdiwe and John Heron, The National: "The Ruins of Raqqa"; Rosemary Barton, Carmen Merrifield, Dominique Banoun and Dave Rae, The National: "Unsafe Harbour"; Avery Haines, Allya Davidson, Madeline McNair, André Lapalme, Jerry Vienneau and Kirk Neff, W5: "The Missing"; Habiba Nosheen, Joseph Loiero, Kimberly Ivany, Aileen McBride, Valerie Ouellet and Ousama Farag, The Fifth Estate: "Death Behind Bars"; Ioanna Roumeliotis, Jennifer Barr, Ousama Farag and Brenda Witmer, The National: "Canada's Silent Shame"	Jonny Harris, Still Standing; Melissa Grelo, Elaine Lui, Cynthia Loyst and Marci Ien, The Social; Tracy Moore, CityLine; David Rocco, David Rocco's Dolce Africa; Drew Scott and Jonathan Scott, Property Brothers
Host in a live program or series
Rick Mercer, New Year's Eve 2017; Michael Bublé, Juno Awards of 2018; Melissa Grelo, Elaine Lui, Cynthia Loyst and Marci Ien, The Social; Dina Pugliese, Breakfast Television

=== Sports ===
Live sporting event coverage	Sports analyst
2018 Stanley Cup Final: Game 5; 2017 Grey Cup; 2018 IIHF World Junior Gold Medal Game	Jack Armstrong, Raptors Basketball on TSN; Cassie Campbell, 2018 Winter Olympics men's and women's ice hockey; Ray Ferraro, 2018 IIHF World Junior Gold Medal Game; Elliotte Friedman, Hockey Night in Canada
Sports host	Sports play-by-play
James Duthie, Free Agent Frenzy; Ron MacLean, Hockey Night in Canada; Andi Petrillo, 2018 Winter Olympics; Luke Wileman, 2018 FIFA World Cup Final	Chris Cuthbert, 2017 Grey Cup; Jim Hughson, Hockey Night in Canada; Gord Miller, 2018 IIHF World Junior Gold Medal Game; Luke Wileman, 2017 MLS Cup
Sports feature segment	Sports opening
Josh Shiaman, Rick Westhead, Stuart Roberts, Devon Burns and Michael Banani, "Finding Murph"; Michael Adach, Mark Wade, Gabriel Levesque, Travis Formosa, Alison Redmond and Marc Leblanc, "Syrian Refugee Al Ziab Family"; Matt Dorman, Darren Dreger, James Judges, Nigel Akam, Kevin Fallis and Darren Oliver, "The Mystery of Paul Ranger"; Matt Dunn, Michael Farber, Brent Blanchard and David Midgley, "Surfacing"	Craig Chambers, Devon Burns, David Midgley and Jacob Frenkel, 2017 Grey Cup; Tim Thompson, Trevor Pilling, Chris Irwin and Jeff Shelegy, 2018 PyeongChang Olympic Winter Games: Primetime Open Ceremony Opening; Simon Garan, Bruce Arthur, Devon Burns, Brent Blanchard and Michael Banani, 2018 FIFA World Cup; Paul Sidhu, Mark Wade, George Skoutakis, John Woo, Kardinal Offishall and Ryan Knight, Northern Touch: The Raptors
Sports program or series	
Reborn: Basketball and Reconciliation in Rwanda; Endless: In Pursuit of the Barkley; I Am: Auston Matthews; Kevin Stevens: Shattered

=== Craft awards ===
Editorial research	Visual research
Timothy Sawa, Lisa Mayor and Zander Sherman, The Fifth Estate: "Murder in Cottage Country"; Hélène Bérubé, Interrupt This Program: "Mexico City"; Maya Bilbao, Still Standing: "Carcross"; Clare DeWitt, Saturn: Inside the Rings; Annabelle Tas, The Life-Sized City: "Mexico City"	Leslie Morrison, The Fifth Estate: "Murder in the Village"; Todd Battis, Gordon Danielson and Matthew Knegt, W5: "6.12.17 09:04:35"; Elizabeth Klinck and Mike Lalonde, You Are Here; Denise O'Brien and Hicham Tiflati, The Way Out
Make-Up	Costume Design
Joanne Jacobsen, Wynonna Earp: "War Paint"; Randy Daudlin, Paul Jones and Trina Brink, Cardinal: Blackfly Season; Melanie Sleep, Back in Time for Dinner: "The 1950s"; Diane Mazur, Anne with an E: "Memory Has as Many Moods as the Temper"; Craig-Ryan French, Killjoys: "The Kids Are Alright?"	Debra Hanson, Frankie Drake Mysteries: "Summer in the City"; Trysha Bakker, Killjoys: "O Mother, Where Art Thou?"; Jennifer Haffenden, Wynonna Earp: "War Paint"; Debra Hanson, Schitt's Creek: "Merry Christmas, Johnny Rose"; Alexander Reda, Anne with an E: "I Protest Against Any Absolute Conclusion"
Photography in a comedy series	Photography in a documentary program or factual series
Jim Westenbrink, Letterkenny: "We Don't Fight at Weddings"; Maya Bankovic, Workin' Moms: "The Sign"; Ian Bibby, Mr. D: "Gerry Cuts a Footloose"; Nick Haight, Baroness von Sketch Show: "Is That You Karen?"; Gerald Packer, Schitt's Creek: "Merry Christmas, Johnny Rose"	Daron Donahue and Aaron Munson, The Nature of Things: "Equus: Story of the Horse / Origins"; Maya Bankovic, In the Making: "Crystal Pite"; Patrick Kaplin, Skindigenous: "Indonesia"; Joshua See, Mommy Wild; John Minh Tran, The Heat: A Kitchen (R)evolution
Photography in a drama program or series	Photography in a lifestyle or reality program or series
Jackson Parrell, Anne with an E: "Youth Is the Season of Hope"; Dylan Macleod, Cardinal: Blackfly Season; Gavin Smith, Mary Kills People: "Ride or Die"; Gavin Smith, Wynonna Earp: "Undo It"; Daniel Villeneuve, Sleeper	Ryan Shaw, The Amazing Race Canada; Matthew Braun, Carnival Eats; Adam Gladstone, The Great Canadian Baking Show; Ryan Morgan and Peter Ventura, Vikings: A New World with ET Canada; Ryan Shaw and Alex Nadon, Top Chef Canada
Photography in a news or information program, series or segment	Editing in a comedy program or series
Jean-François Bisson, CBC News: The National: "The Ruins of Raqqa"; Jason Burles, CBC News: The National: "The Wall"; Richard Devey, CBC News: The National: "Rohingya Refugees"; Marc D'Amours, CTV National News: "Refugee Children, Portraits of Pain"	Mike Fly, Marianna Khoury, Jeremy LaLonde and Stephen Withrow, Baroness von Sketch Show: "Is That You Karen?"; Jonathan Eagan, Workin' Moms: "2005"; Dean Soltys and Ehren Davis, Mr. D: "Gerry's Insider's Look"; Kyle Martin, Letterkenny: "Letterkenny Spelling Bee"; Jeremy Harty and Sarah Byrne, Trailer Park Boys: "Fuckin' Fucked Out of Our Fuckin' Minds"
Editing in a dramatic program or series	Editing in a documentary program or series
Matthew Anas, Cardinal: Blackfly Season; Duncan Christie, Mary Kills People: "Fatal Flaw"; Tad Seaborn, Vikings: "The Joke"; D. Gillian Truster, Anne with an E: "I Protest Against Any Absolute Conclusion"; Paul Winestock, Blood and Water: "201"	Cathy Gulkin, You Are Here: A Come from Away Story; Tony Coleman, The Nature of Things: "Mommy Wildest"; Michael Hannan, Into the Fire; Scott Parker, The Nature of Things: "Equus: Story of the Horse / First Riders"; Brenda Turning and Krystal Moss, The Nature of Things: "Equus: Story of the Horse / Chasing the Wind"
Editing in a factual program or series	Editing in a reality or competition program or series
Fannie Daoust and Glenn Berman, The Detectives; David Yenovkian, A User's Guide to Cheating Death; Aaron Shapero, Intervention Canada; Devin Hughes, Kevin Syer, Pete Mahoney and Kelly Dobbs, etalk; Joanne Barnard, The Life-Sized City	Michael Tersigni, Jonathan Dowler, Clare Elson, Owin Lambeck, Gloria Tong and David Yenovkian, The Amazing Race Canada; Jonathan Dowler, Baun Mah, Ryan Monteith, Mike Scott, Jordan Wood, Andrew Gurney, Al Manson, Seth Poulin, Michael Tersigni, Kailey Birk, Chris Donaldson, Joel Pylshyn, Dan Cable, Clare Elson, Adam Richardson, Jordan Crute, Owin Lambeck and Jon White, Big Brother Canada; Michael Tersigni, Ryan Monteith, Mike Scott and Elianna Borsa, Top Chef Canada; Ben O'Neil, The Great Canadian Baking Show; Jordan Wood, The Great Canadian Baking Show
Production design/art direction in a fiction program or series	Production design/art direction in a non-fiction program or series
Jean-François Campeau, Andrew Berry and Elliott Carew, Anne with an E: "Signs are Small Measurable Things, but Interpretations are Illimitable"; Ian Brock and Kelly Diamond, Killjoys: "Greening Pains"; Rory Cheyne, Cardinal: Blackfly Season; Ingrid Jurek, Cathy Cowan and Amber Humphries, Wynonna Earp: "Daddy Lessons"; Armando Sgrignuoli and Andrew Kawczynski, Frankie Drake Mysteries: "Healing Hands"	Tarik Mikou, Tower of Song: A Memorial Tribute to Leonard Cohen; Peter Faragher, Kevin Halliday, Aaron Scholl and Andy Roskaft, Big Brother Canada; Callum Maclachlan and Mark Hockin, The 2018 Indspire Awards; Katelin Ferry and Brian Garvey, Back in Time for Dinner; Peter Faragher, Canada's Smartest Person Junior
Sound in a fiction program or series	Sound in a non-fiction program or series
Jane Tattersall, David McCallum, Steve Medeiros, Dale Sheldrake, Davi Aquino, Claire Dobson, Goro Koyama, Yuri Gorbachow, Martin Lee and Ian Rankin, Vikings: "Moments of Vision"; Mark Shnuriwsky, Janice Ierulli, Matthew Hussey, Sid Lieberman, Michael Markiw, Mike Woroniuk and Paul Shubat, Wynonna Earp: "War Paint"; Jonas Kühnermann, Mark Beck, Richard Calistan, John Dykstra, Alfie Di Pucchio, Steve Hammond and Eric Fitz, Murdoch Mysteries: "F.L.A.S.H.!"; Jane Tattersall, Paul Germann, David McCallum, Krystin Hunter, Kelly McGahey, Martin Lee, Stacy Coutts, Sandra Fox and Chelsea Body, Cardinal: Blackfly Season; Alan deGraaf, Scott Shepherd, John Elliot, Tyler Whitham, Danielle McBride, Roman Alexander Buchok, Joe Bracciale, Dashen Naidoo, Alexander “Zan” Rosborough and Joe Mancuso, Anne with an E: "Youth Is the Season of Hope"	Doug McClement and Sanjay Mehta, Gord Downie's Secret Path in Concert; Johnny Blerot and Ian Pattison, The Nature of Things: "Equus: Story of the Horse / Origins"; Dave Rose, Christian Cooke, Colin McLellan, Dustin Harris, Steve Blair, Ian McGettigan and David Hocs, You Are Here: A Come From Away Story; Gary Vaughan and Richard Spence-Thomas, Dreaming of a Jewish Christmas; Gary Vaughan and Richard Spence-Thomas, The Group of Seven Guitars
Sound in an animated program or series	Visual effects
Richard Spence-Thomas, Tim Muirhead, Patton Rodrigues, Ryan Ongaro and Kyle Peters, PAW Patrol: "Ultimate Rescue: Pups Save the Royal Kitties"; Mike Mancuso, Ryan Eligh, Joe Tetreau, Dante Winkler, Eric Mattar-Hurlbut and Paul Talbott, Supernoobs; Scott McCrorie, Glenn Barna, Evan Turner, Alex Mine and Ryan Eligh, Wishfart: "We Are Cheetah Face"; Miguel Nunes, Super Dinosaur: "The Great Race"; Ryan Araki, Andrew McDonnell, Simon Berry, Sue Robertson and Julia Snell, Hotel Transylvania: The Series: "The Legend of Pumpkin Guts"	Dominic Remane, Bill Halliday, Ovidiu Cinazan, Michael Borrett, Tom Morrison, Leann Harvey, Colin Hui, Paul Wishart, Jim Maxwell and Kieran McKay, Vikings: "Moments of Vision"; Lon Molnar, Giancarlo Derchie, Mike Duffy, Che Spencer, Anthony De Chellis, Mike Kwan, Frank Calero, Michael Enzbrunner, Parastu Rezaie and Mark Ferguson, Wynonna Earp: "War Paint"; Curt Miller, Terry Hutcheson, Tim Mulvihill, Dan Dixon, Sean Gilhooly, Rob Geddes, Brent Veal, Elaine Fung, Jun Matsumaru and Mitch Stuart, Travelers: "Ave Machina"; Michael Gibson, Danny McNair, Anthony Paterson, Lara Osland, Tim Sharp, Rachad Meya, David Rezek, Mohsin Kazi, Min Young Kim and Chris Doe, Killjoys: "The Kids Are Alright?"; Michael Dowding, Steven Elford and Marcel Simons, ReBoot: The Guardian Code: "Black Hole"
Casting	Hair
Jenny Lewis and Sara Kay, Letterkenny; Jon Comerford and Lisa Parasyn, Schitt's Creek; Sharon Forrest and Susan Forrest, Mary Kills People; Jon Comerford and Lisa Parasyn, Cardinal: Blackfly Season; Frank Moiselle, Nuala Moiselle and Deirdre Bowen, Vikings	Zinka Tuminski, Anne with an E: "Memory Has as Many Moods as the Temper"; Shirley Bond, Murdoch Mysteries: "8 Footsteps"; Teresa Buccione, Killjoys: "Sporemageddon"; Norma Richard, Caught; Jo-Dee Thomson, Wynonna Earp: "Blood Red and Going Down"

=== Directing ===
Children's or youth	Comedy
J. J. Johnson, Odd Squad: "World Turned Odd, Pt. 1"; Derby Crewe, The Next Step: "Coup d'état"; J. J. Johnson, Dino Dana: "A Dino Never Forgets / Claw and Order"; Mitchell T. Ness, The Next Step: "No Shell"; Ryan Marley, Science Max: "Gravity Boat"	Jacob Tierney, Letterkenny: "Bock et Biche"; Tracey Deer, Mohawk Girls: "White but A'Right"; Sturla Gunnarsson, Schitt's Creek: "Singles Week"; Daniel Levy and Andrew Cividino, Schitt's Creek: "Merry Christmas, Johnny Rose"; Catherine Reitman, Workin' Moms: "2005"
Documentary or factual series	Documentary program
Christine Nielsen, The Nature of Things: "Jumbo: The Life of an Elephant Superstar"; Cynthia Banks, The Caregivers' Club; Ryan Marley, Intervention Canada: "Jade"; Chelsea McMullan, In the Making: "Crystal Pite"; Niobe Thompson, The Nature of Things: "Equus: Story of the Horse — First Riders"	Larry Weinstein, Dreaming of a Jewish Christmas; Leora Eisen, The Nature of Things: "Into the Fire"; Elisa Paloschi, Driving with Selvi; Wendy Rowland, 14 & Muslim; Tim Wolochatiuk, 100 Days to Victory
Dramatic program or mini–series	Dramatic series
Jeff Renfroe, Cardinal: Blackfly Season; Fab Filippo, Save Me; Philippe Gagnon, Sometimes the Good Kill; Gary Harvey, Murdoch Mysteries: Home for the Holidays; T. J. Scott, Caught	Norma Bailey, Mary Kills People: "Ride or Die"; Daniel Grou, Vikings: "Moments of Vision"; Helen Shaver, Anne with an E: "Youth Is the Season of Hope"; Peter Stebbings, Frankie Drake Mysteries: "Ghosts"; Jeff Woolnough, Vikings: "The Joke"
Lifestyle or information	Live sporting event
Spencer Ramsay, Carnival Eats: "Close Encounters of the Food Kind"; Shelagh Cooke, Holmes and Holmes: "Water: The Good, the Bad and the Money"; Gillian Parker, The Social: "Thousandth"; Frank Samson, Home to Win: "Good Things Come in Threes"; Misty Tyson, Property Brothers: Buying and Selling: "Paula & Isabel"	Andy Bouyoukos, 2017 Grey Cup; Andy Bouyoukos, 2018 IIHF World Junior Gold Medal Game; Ron Forsythe, 2018 Stanley Cup Final
Reality or competition program or series	Variety or sketch comedy program or series
Rob Brunner, The Amazing Race Canada: "Sounds Like a Wild Boar"; Rob Brunner, Top Chef Canada: "Finale Four Ways"; Dave Russell, Canada's Smartest Person Junior: "Episode 1"; Dave Russell, The Great Canadian Baking Show: "Finale"; Dave Russell, MasterChef Canada: "Vive la Pressure Test"	Jordan Canning and Jeremy LaLonde, Baroness von Sketch Show: "Is That You Karen?; Jack Bender, Tower of Song: A Memorial Tribute to Leonard Cohen; Mike Downie and Justin Stephenson, Gord Downie's Secret Path in Concert; Shelagh O'Brien, 2017 Scotiabank Giller Prize; Dave Russell, Juno Awards of 2018
Animated program or series
Robin Budd, Hotel Transylvania: The Series: "A Few Good Monsters"; Pedro Eboli, Cupcake & Dino: General Services: "Cupcake's Big Surprise"; Jason Groh, Wishfart: "We Can Eat Sand"; Paul Hunt, The Cat in the Hat Knows a Lot About That!: "The Search for String"; William Lau, Super Dinosaur: "Big Brother"

=== Music ===
Fiction	Non-fiction
Todor Kobakov, Cardinal: Blackfly Season; Amin Bhatia and Ari Posner, Anne with an E: "I Protest Against Any Absolute Conclusion"; Rob Carli, Murdoch Mysteries: "Shadows Are Falling"; Todor Kobakov, Ransom: "Radio Silence"; Trevor Morris, Vikings: "Moments of Vision"	Darren Fung, The Nature of Things: "Equus: Story of the Horse"; Kieran Adams, In the Making: "Dana Michel"; Justin Delorme, Taken: "Angela Meyer"; Mark Korven, The Nature of Things: "The Kingdom: How Fungi Made Our World"; Laurel MacDonald and Phil Strong, You Are Here
Animation	
James Chapple, Graeme Cornies, David Kelly and Brian Pickett, PAW Patrol: "Ultimate Rescue: Pups Save the Royal Kitties"; Steffan Andrews, Cloudy with a Chance of Meatballs: "Something Fishy"; Jonathan Evans and Daniel Ingram, Esme & Roy: "Two Can Play at That Game"; Neil Parfitt, Ranger Rob: "Sea Monsters of Big Sky Park"; Derek Treffry and Greg Fisher, Mother Nature Is Trying to Kill You

=== Writing ===
Children's or youth	Comedy
Mark De Angelis and Leah Gotcsik, Odd Squad: "Where There's a Wolf, There's a Way / New Jacket Required"; Claire Cappelletti, Finding Stuff Out: "The Nose Knows"; J. J. Johnson, Christin Simms and Nathalie Younglai, Dino Dana: "A Dino Never Forgets / Claw and Order"; Penelope Laurence, Finding Stuff Out: "Noisy Bodies"; Karen McClellan, The Next Step: "Twinkle Toes"	Jared Keeso and Jacob Tierney, Letterkenny: "Letterkenny Spelling Bee"; Andrew Appelle, Robert Hyland, Curt Lobb, Jay McCarrol, Matthew Miller and Jared Raab, Nirvanna the Band the Show: "The Book"; Daniel Levy, Schitt's Creek: "Singles Week"; Cynthia Knight, Mohawk Girls: "White but A'Right"; John Paul Tremblay, Mike Smith and Robb Wells, Trailer Park Boys: "Fuckin' Fucked Out of Our Fuckin' Minds"
Documentary	Dramatic program or miniseries
Gillian Findlay, The Fifth Estate: "The Truth Smugglers"; Jason Charters, Dreaming of a Jewish Christmas; Christine Nielsen, The Nature of Things: "Jumbo: The Life of an Elephant Superstar"; Barry Stevens, Undercover Jihadi; Niobe Thompson, The Nature of Things: "Equus: Story of the Horse"	Sarah Dodd, Cardinal: Blackfly Season: "Red"; Fab Filippo, Save Me; Laurie Finstad Knizhnik, The Queen of Sin; Jennica Harper, Cardinal: Blackfly Season: "Toof"; Allan Hawco, Caught
Drama series	Factual program or series
Michael Konyves, Bad Blood: "Who Are You?"; Tara Armstrong, Mary Kills People: "The Means"; Kathryn Borel, Anne with an E: "The True Seeing Is Within"; Tassie Cameron, Lara Azzopardi and Marsha Greene, Mary Kills People: "Come to Jesus"; Mary Pedersen, Murdoch Mysteries: "The Accident"	Jonny Harris, Fraser Young, Graham Chittenden and Steve Dylan, Still Standing: "Carcross"; Neil Grahn and Laurie-Ann Smith, Queen of the Oil Patch: "This Is Where I'm From"; David McGunigal, Dr. Keri: Prairie Vet: "Animal Farm"; Nicole Tomlinson and Neil Thomas, Highway Thru Hell: "Trapped"; Catharine Parke and Todd Serotiuk, Heavy Rescue: 401: "Feels Like a Win"
Lifestyle or reality/competition program or series	Variety or sketch comedy program or series
Elvira Kurt, The Great Canadian Baking Show: "Bread Week"; Trevor Hammond, Big Brother Canada: "Finale"; Mark Peacock, Rob Brunner and Mark Lysakowski, The Amazing Race Canada: "Just a Beaver Hero"; Paulina Robak, The Amazing Race Canada: "Sounds Like a Wild Boar"; Yette Vandendam, Tracie Tighe and Christopher Nelson, Dragons' Den: "Episode 1"	Carolyn Taylor, Meredith MacNeill, Aurora Browne, Jennifer Whalen, Jennifer Goodhue and Monica Heisey, Baroness von Sketch Show: "Is that you Karen?"; Matt Alden, Sheldon Elter, Howie Miller and Joleen Ballendine, Caution: May Contain Nuts; Carrie Mudd, Tower of Song: A Memorial Tribute to Leonard Cohen; Wayne Testori, Kevin Wallis, Rob Lindsay and Carly Heffernan, Air Farce New Year's Eve 2017
Animated program or series	
Brent Butt, Corner Gas Animated: "Squatch Your Language"; Emer Connon, Wishfart: "Does This Please the Jigmaster"; John Hazlett, Lienne Sawatsky and Dan Williams, Wishfart: "Litterfools Ain't Cool"; Sean Jara, Mysticons: "The Princess and the Pirate"; Stephanie Kaliner, Wishfart: "Aw, Man!"	

== Digital media ==
Cross-Platform Project	Cross-Platform Project, Children's
CBC News: Missing and Murdered: Finding Cleo; Deadly Force; Moosemeat & Marmalade Interactive: Food for Thought; Taken Knowledge Keeper; Wild Canadian Year 360	Dino Dana Digital; Daisy & the Gumboot Kids; Finding Stuff Out Online; Miaomiao's Chinese for Kids
Web Series, fiction	Web Series, Non-Fiction
How to Buy a Baby; Chateau Laurier; Gary and His Demons; Ghost BFF; NarcoLeap	The Artists: The Pioneers Behind the Pixels — Omar Majeed, Peter Mishara, Christina Piovesan; Farm Crime; In Chinatown; The Move; MUCH Pride
Original interactive production	Virtual reality game
Nuclear Dissent; It Was Me	Museum of Symmetry; Flow Weaver
Lead performance, web program or series	Supporting performance, web program or series
Alex Ozerov, Pyotr495; Aurora Browne, The Writers' Block; Kayla Lorette, Space Riders: Division Earth; Vanessa Matsui, Ghost BFF; Morgan Waters, The Amazing Gayl Pile: Apocalypse Soonish	Jayne Eastwood, The Writers' Block; Inessa Frantowski, The Amazing Gayl Pile: Apocalypse Soonish; Dennis Nimoh Jr., P2 - GTA (Petrol); Fei Ren, This Blows; Aron Tager, My 90-Year-Old Roommate
Direction, web program or series	Writing, web program or series
Grayson Moore, Aidan Shipley, Connor Illsley and Jon Riera, Deerbrook; Lucius Dechausay, The Move; Erica Daniels, Run As One: The Journey of the Front Runners; Blake Mawson, Pyotr495; Laura O'Grady, Gross Indecency: The Everett Klippert Story	Mark Little, Gary and His Demons; Heather Evans, Mieke Anderson, Jennifer Fowler, Marnie Luke and Connie Walker, CBC News: Missing and Murdered: "Finding Cleo"; Wendy Litner, How to Buy a Baby; Peter Mishara and Omar Majeed, The Artists: The Pioneers Behind the Pixels; Winston Rowntree, peopleWatching
Immersive experience, fiction	Immersive experience, non-fiction
Biidaaban: First Light; Contravision; The Great C; Isle of Dogs: Behind the Scenes in Virtual Reality; Jurassic World: Blue	A Curious Mind with Dominic Monaghan; CBC Live Virtual Reality: 2018 PyeongChang Olympic Winter Games; Made This Way: Redefining Masculinity; Manic VR; Space Explorers
Host, web program or series
Danielle Graham and Elaine Lui, Etalk Live: The Oscars Balcony; Dan Hayes, Moosemeat & Marmalade Interactive: Food for Thought; Dave Keystone, Small Talk; Yvette Lu, House Call with Dr. Yvette Lu; Scott McGillivray, Scott's House Call
