= George Brady (Holocaust survivor) =

Czech Canadian Holocaust survivor

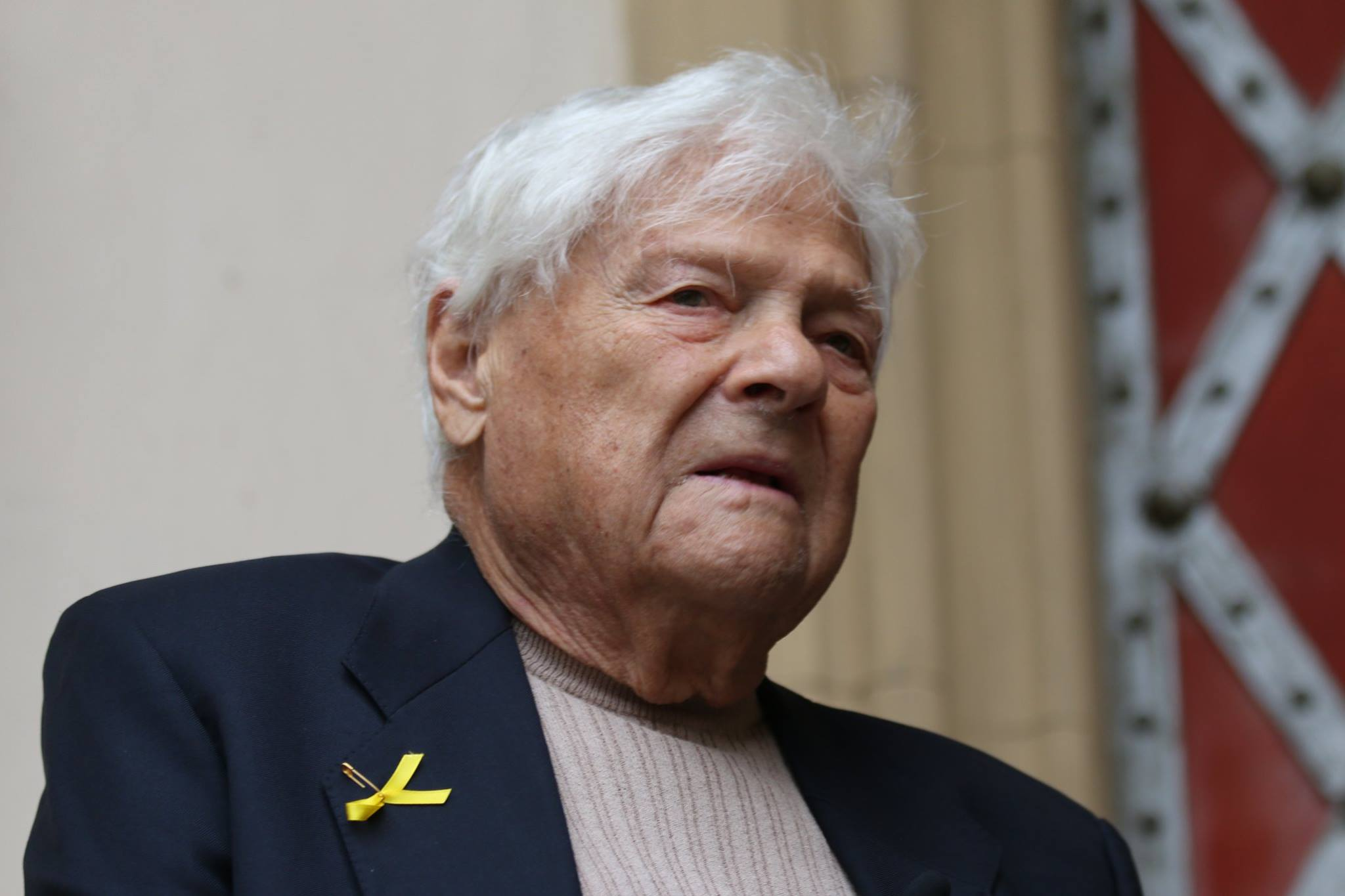
- Born: Jiří Brady; 9 February 1928; Nové Město na Moravě, Czechoslovakia
- Died: 11 January 2019 (aged 90); Toronto, Ontario, Canada
- Parent(s): Markéta Bradyová (mother); Karel Brady (father)
- Relatives: Hana Brady (sister; deceased)

George Jiri Brady OOnt (born Jiří Brady; 9 February 1928 – 11 January 2019) was a Holocaust survivor of both Theresienstadt (Terezín) and Auschwitz (Oświęcim, Poland), who became a businessman in Canada and was awarded the Order of Ontario in 2008.

== Early life during the Holocaust ==
The son of Markéta and Karel Brady and brother of Hana Brady, George Brady lived an ordinary childhood in interwar Czechoslovakia until March 1939, when Nazi Germany took control of Bohemia and Moravia. After that, his Jewish family encountered increasing restrictions and persecution by the German occupiers. By 1942, Brady's parents had been separated from their children and sent to prisons and Nazi concentration camps, perishing in Auschwitz before the end of the Second World War. For a short time, George and Hana stayed with an aunt and uncle; he was not Jewish, and thus the couple was a "privileged" mixed marriage and not subject to deportation. The children were deported in May 1942 to Theresienstadt, a ghetto-camp not far from Prague, Czechoslovakia, where George shared Kinderheim L417 with around forty boys including Petr Ginz, Yehuda Bacon, and Kurt Kotouc.

George and Hana remained in Theresienstadt until 1944, when they were sent in separate convoys to Auschwitz — George in September to the work camp and Hana in October, where she was soon executed in a gas chamber. George was transferred from Auschwitz to Gleiwitz I subcamp, where he worked repairing damaged railway cars. Brady escaped during a death march to Germany in January 1945, the same month Auschwitz was liberated.

Interview with George Brady for Show Jana Krause

== Life after the Holocaust ==
Brady traveled until May 1946 when he reached his aunt and uncle in Nové Město in Czechoslovakia and he learned from them that his parents had been murdered in Auschwitz. After the Communist coup in 1948, he escaped to Austria in 1949 and moved to Toronto, Ontario, Canada, two years later.

Brady made a living in the plumbing trade, in which he had trained and worked in Theresienstadt Ghetto. Early in 1951, he established a plumbing company in Toronto with another Holocaust survivor. He married and became a father to three sons and a daughter. The family resided in Toronto and later on, he was made a member of the Order of Ontario in 2008.

In 2009, he was featured prominently in Inside Hana's Suitcase, Larry Weinstein's documentary film about Brady's sister Hana who was murdered in the Holocaust.

In 2016, he was supposed to receive an award for his lifelong campaign for Holocaust remembrance from Czech President Miloš Zeman on the state day of 28 October. Ultimately, the president decided against conferring the honor on him after Brady's distant relative, Czech government minister Daniel Herman, met exiled Tibetan leader the Dalai Lama against the president's wishes.

Among his many lifetime honors, he was also awarded the Order of Merit of the Federal Republic of Germany.

George Brady died of heart failure in Toronto on 11 January 2019 at the age of 90.
