= Karen Levine =

Canadian writer

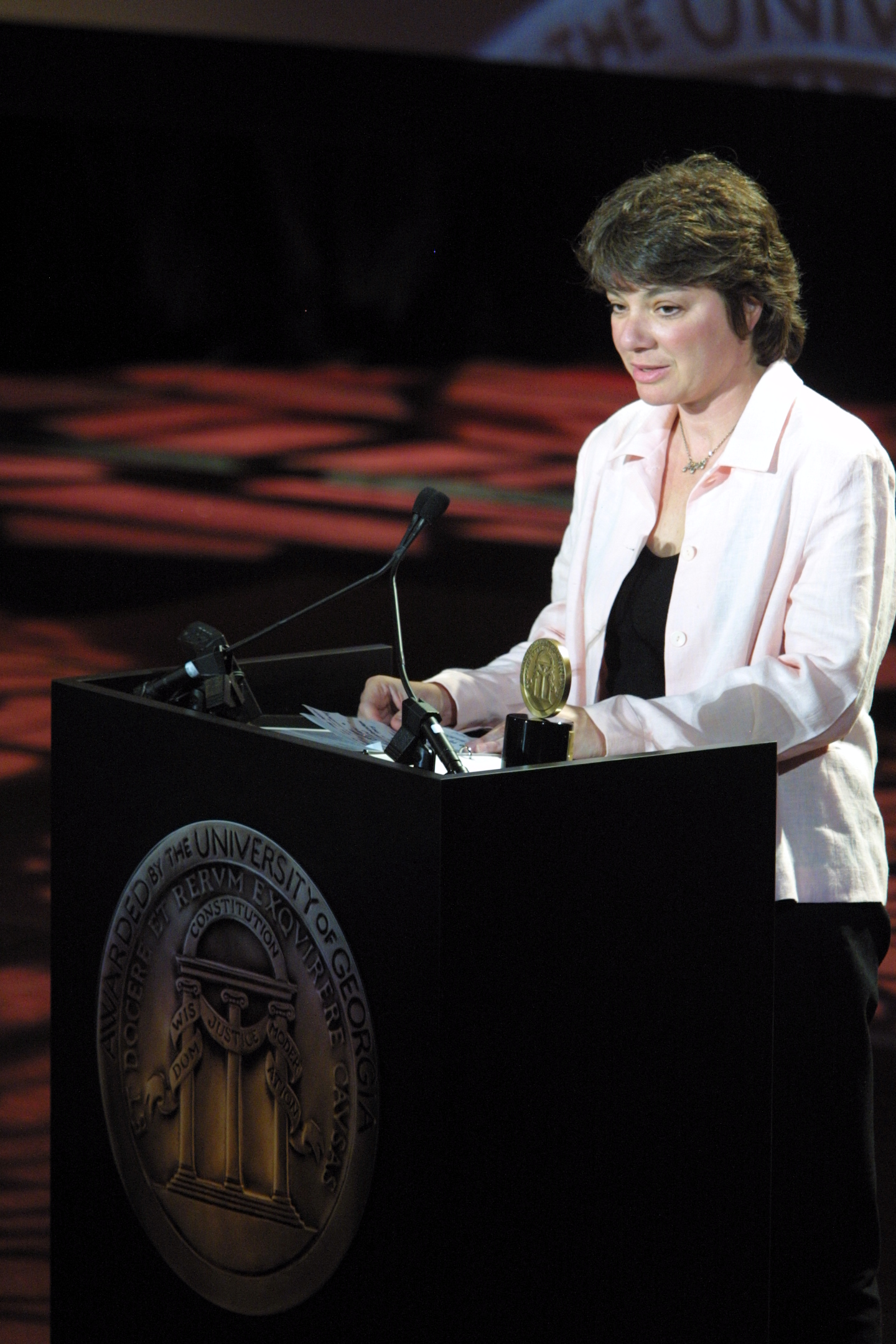
Karen Levine accepting the Peabody Award, May 2002

Karen Levine CM (born 1955) is a Canadian radio producer and writer. Her radio documentaries have won two Peabody Awards. On December 18, 2024, she was named a Member of the Order of Canada. Karen has worked for the Canadian Broadcasting Corporation (CBC) for over thirty years, working on shows such as The Sunday Edition, As It Happens, Morningside and This Morning. She now lives in Toronto.

Her radio documentary for CBC Hana's Suitcase won a gold medal at the New York International Radio Festival. In 2002, she published a book based on that documentary Hana's Suitcase: A True Story. An international best-seller, the book received the Sydney Taylor Book Award for older readers, the Canadian Library Association Book of the Year for Children Award, the Flora Stieglitz Straus Award and the Isaac Frischwasser Memorial Award in Children’s Literature. It appeared on the short lists for the Norma Fleck Award and the Governor General's Award for English-language children's literature. The book was adapted into a play by Emil Sher and a 2009 documentary film, Inside Hana's Suitcase, by Larry Weinstein.

Levine was producer for the CBC radio documentaries Lost Innocence: The Children of World War II and A Murder in the Neighbourhood which received Peabody Awards in 1989 and 2001 respectively.
