= Videography (disambiguation) =

Videography is the process or profession of filming videos.

Videography may also refer to:

- Videography, a structured list of music videos or other video releases; see discography and filmography
- Videography, a research technique that uses video medium for data collection, analysis, or presentation; see visual research
- Videography (or broadcast videography), transmission of textual or other information by means of encoding it into normal television signals; see teletext and videotex
