= Elizabeth Klinck =

Elizabeth Klinck is a visual researcher and clearance specialist in the Canadian and international documentary film industry. Some of the notable projects she has worked on include Werner Herzog's Into the Inferno, Thorsten Schütte's Eat That Question: Frank Zappa in His Own Words, Barry Arvich's Quality Balls: The David Steinberg Story, Sarah Polley's Stories We Tell, Hrund Gunnsteinsdottir's Innsaei and Neil Diamond's Reel Injun.

She was nominated for an Emmy Award in the craft of research, and three times for Best Visual Researcher at the FOCAL Awards in the United Kingdom. She has also won the 2014, 2015 and 2017 Barbara Sears Award for Best Visual Research from the Canadian Screen Awards. In 2021, Elizabeth won her fourth Barbara Sears Award for her work on Cheating Hitler: Surviving the Holocaust. In 2015 she won a Prix Gemeaux for her work on Apocalypse World One and in 2010 she won a Gemini for Best Visual Research for her work on Reel Injun. She has also won a Yorkton Golden Sheaf award and was honored with the FOCAL International Lifetime Achievement Award in 2008. She is the founding chairperson of the Visual Researchers' Society of Canada.

== Awards ==
Year	Award	Film/Television Program	Co-Winner
2008	FOCAL Lifetime Achievement Award		
2008	Yorkton Golden Sheaf for Best Research	The Nature of Things: "The Science of the Senses - Touch"	
2010	Gemini for Best Visual Research	Reel Injun	Laura Blaney
2011	FOCAL Award for Best Use of Footage in a Factual Production ]	Reel Injun	Laura Blaney
2014	Barbara Sears Canadian Screen Award for Best Visual Research	Quality Balls: The David Steinberg Story	
2014	DOC Star Award Documentary Organization of Canada		
2015	Gémeaux for Best Research	Apocalypse World War One	Valerie Combard
2015	Barbara Sears Canadian Screen Award for Best Visual Research	Apocalypse World War One	Valerie Combard
2017	Barbara Sears Canadian Screen Award for Best Visual Research	How to Change the World	Elizabeth Etherington
2017	FOCAL Award for Best Use of Footage in an Arts Production	Eat That Question: Frank Zappa in His Own Words	
2019	Canadian Screen Award - Academy Board of Director's Tribute		
2021	Barbara Sears Canadian Screen Award for Best Visual Research	Cheating Hitler: Surviving the Holocaust	Elspeth Domville, Monica Penner

== Nominations ==
Year	Award	Film/Television Program	Co-Researcher
2002	Gemini Award for Best Biographical Documentary Program	Ted Allan: Minstrel Boy of the Twentieth Century	
2005	FOCAL Award Nominated for Footage Researcher of the Year		
2006	Emmy Award Nominated for Outstanding Individual Achievement in Craft: Research	Middle Sexes: Redefining He and She	
2010	Gemini for Best Visual Research	Reel Injun	Laura Blaney
2011	Best Use of Footage in a Factual Production	Reel Injun	Laura Blaney
2011	FOCAL Award Nominated for Jane Mercer Footage Researcher of the Year		
2014	FOCAL Award Nominated for Best Use of Footage in an Entertainment Production	Quality Balls: The David Steinberg Story	
2014	FOCAL Award Nominated for Best Use of Footage in a Factual Production	Arctic Defenders	
2014	FOCAL Award Nominated for Jane Mercer Footage Researcher of the Year		
2014	Barbara Sears Canadian Screen Award for Best Visual Research	Quality Balls: The David Steinberg Story	
2015	Barbara Sears Canadian Screen Award for Best Visual Research	The Secret Disco Revolution	
2015	Barbara Sears Canadian Screen Award for Best Visual Research	Apocalypse World War One	Valerie Combard
2015	Gémeaux for Best Research Current Affairs	Apocalypse World War One	Valerie Combard
2017	Barbara Sears Canadian Screen Award for Best Visual Research	How to Change the World	Elizabeth Etherington
2017	Barbara Sears Canadian Screen Award for Best Visual Research	Claude Lanzmann: Spectres of the Shoah	Adam Benzine, Leslie Swift, Lindsay Zarwell
2017	FOCAL Award for Best Use of Footage in an Arts Production	Eat That Question - Frank Zappa in His Own Words	
2017	FOCAL Award for Best Use of Footage in a Cinema Release	Eat That Question - Frank Zappa in His Own Words	
2017	FOCAL Award for Best Use of Footage about the Natural World	Into the Inferno	
2018	Barbara Sears Canadian Screen Award for Best Visual Research	Quebec My Country Mon Pays	
2018	Barbara Sears Canadian Screen Award for Best Visual Research	The Devil's Horn	Elspeth Domville
2019	Barbara Sears Canadian Screen Award for Best Visual Research	You are Here: A Come From Away Story	
2021	Barbara Sears Canadian Screen Award for Best Visual Research	Cheating Hitler: Surviving the Holocaust	Elspeth Domville, Monica Penner
2021	Barbara Sears Canadian Screen Award for Best Visual Research	Gordon Lightfoot: If You Could Read My Mind	
