= Inside Hana's Suitcase =

2009 Canadian documentary film

- Directed by: Larry Weinstein
- Written by: Karen Levine; Thomas Wallner
- Produced by: Rudolf Biermann; Jessica Daniel; Larry Weinstein
- Cinematography: Horst Zeidler
- Edited by: David New
- Music by: Alexina Louie; Alex Pauk
- Production companies: Rhombus Media; In Film Praha
- Release date: February 2009
- Running time: 93 minutes
- Country: Canada
- Language: English

Inside Hana's Suitcase is a Canadian documentary film, directed by Larry Weinstein and released in 2009. Adapted in part from Karen Levine's book Hana's Suitcase, who originally received Hana's Suitcase, the film centres on the story of Hana Brady, a young Czechoslovak Jewish girl who died in the Holocaust, including the reminiscences of George Brady, her sole surviving brother who emigrated to Canada following the war. The film also follows the journey of Fumiko Ishioka who tried identifying the owner of the Suitcase.

The film premiered in February 2009 at the Victoria Film Festival. It was subsequently screened at the 2009 Hot Docs Canadian International Documentary Festival, where it was second runner-up for the Hot Docs Audience Award. It was commercially released in November 2009, and was broadcast by CBC Television in March 2011.

The film received a Genie Award nomination for Best Feature Length Documentary at the 30th Genie Awards in 2010.
