= List of awards and nominations received by Black-ish =

Awards and nominations for Black-ish
Awards and nominations
Award	Wins	Nominations
Golden Globe	1	6
NAACP	27	18
Nickelodeon Kids' Choice	0	5
Teen Choice	0	3
Emmy Awards	1	26
MTV Movie & TV Awards	1	1
People's Choice Awards	0	1
Satellite Awards	0	3
Screen Actors Guild Awards	0	4
American Film Institute	1	0
Cinema Audio Society Awards	0	1
Critics' Choice Television Award	0	11
GLAAD Media Award	0	1
Peabody Award	1	0
Producers Guild of America Award	0	1
Rockie Awards	0	1
TCA Awards	1	1
Young Artist Award	1	4

Totals (Note: Certain award groups do not simply award one winner. They acknowledge several different recipients, have runners-up, and have third place. Since this is a specific recognition and is different from losing an award, runner-up mentions are considered wins in this award tally. For simplification and to avoid errors, each award in this list has been presumed to have had a prior nomination.)
- Wins: 34
- Nominations: 90

The American sitcom television series Black-ish has received many awards and nominations since it premiered on September 24, 2014.

== American Film Institute ==
Year	Award	Category	Nominee(s)	Result	Ref.
2015	American Film Institute	Top 10 TV Shows	Black-ish	Won	

== Cinema Audio Society Awards ==
Year	Award	Category	Nominee(s)	Result	Ref.
2017	Cinema Audio Society Awards	Outstanding Achievement in Sound Mixing for Television Series – Half Hour	Tom N. Stasinis, Peter J. Nusbaum and Whitney Purple for "God"	Nominated	

== Critics' Choice Television Awards ==
Year	Award	Category	Nominee(s)	Result	Ref.
2015	Critics' Choice Television Awards	Best Actor in a Comedy Series	Anthony Anderson	Nominated	
2016	Critics' Choice Television Awards	Best Comedy Series	Black-ish	Nominated	
2016	Critics' Choice Television Awards	Best Actor in a Comedy Series	Anthony Anderson	Nominated	
2016	Critics' Choice Television Awards	Best Actress in a Comedy Series	Tracee Ellis Ross	Nominated	
2016	Critics' Choice Television Awards	Best Guest Performer in a Comedy Series	Jenifer Lewis	Nominated	
2016	Critics' Choice Television Awards	Best Comedy Series	Black-ish	Nominated	
2016	Critics' Choice Television Awards	Best Actor in a Comedy Series	Anthony Anderson	Nominated	
2016	Critics' Choice Television Awards	Best Actress in a Comedy Series	Tracee Ellis Ross	Nominated	
2018	Critics' Choice Television Awards	Best Comedy Series	Black-ish	Nominated	
2018	Critics' Choice Television Awards	Best Actor in a Comedy Series	Anthony Anderson	Nominated	
2018	Critics' Choice Television Awards	Best Supporting Actress in a Comedy Series	Jenifer Lewis	Nominated	

== GLAAD Media Awards ==
Year	Award	Category	Nominee(s)	Result	Ref.
2017	GLAAD Media Awards	Outstanding Individual Episode	"Johnson & Johnson"	Nominated	

== Golden Globe Awards ==
Year	Award	Category	Nominee(s)	Result	Ref.
2017	Golden Globe Awards	Best Television Series – Musical or Comedy	Black-ish	Nominated	
2017	Golden Globe Awards	Best Actor – Television Series Musical or Comedy	Anthony Anderson	Nominated	
2017	Golden Globe Awards	Best Actress – Television Series Musical or Comedy	Tracee Ellis Ross	Won	
2018	Golden Globe Awards	Best Television Series – Musical or Comedy	Black-ish	Nominated	
2018	Golden Globe Awards	Best Actor – Television Series Musical or Comedy	Anthony Anderson	Nominated	
2022	Golden Globe Awards	Best Actor – Television Series Musical or Comedy	Anthony Anderson	Nominated	
2022	Golden Globe Awards	Best Actress – Television Series Musical or Comedy	Tracee Ellis Ross	Nominated	

== Hollywood Critics Association ==
Year	Award	Category	Nominee(s)	Result	Ref.
2021	Hollywood Critics Association TV Awards	Best Broadcast Network Series, Comedy	black-ish	Nominated	
2021	Hollywood Critics Association TV Awards	Best Actor in a Broadcast Network or Cable Series, Comedy	Anthony Anderson	Nominated	
2021	Hollywood Critics Association TV Awards	Best Actress in a Broadcast Network or Cable Series, Comedy	Tracee Ellis Ross	Nominated	
2022	Hollywood Critics Association TV Awards	Best Broadcast Network Series, Comedy	black-ish	Nominated	
2022	Hollywood Critics Association TV Awards	Best Actor in a Broadcast Network or Cable Series, Comedy	Anthony Anderson	Nominated	
2022	Hollywood Critics Association TV Awards	Best Actress in a Broadcast Network or Cable Series, Comedy	Tracee Ellis Ross	Nominated	
2022	Hollywood Critics Association TV Awards	Best Directing in a Broadcast Network or Cable Series, Comedy	Iona Morris Jackson (for "If a Black Man Cries in the Woods")	Nominated	

== Kids' Choice Awards ==
Year	Award	Category	Nominee(s)	Result	Ref.
2016	Kids' Choice Awards	Favorite TV Actor – Family Show	Anthony Anderson	Nominated	
2017	Kids' Choice Awards	Favorite TV Show – Family Show	Black-ish	Nominated	
2021	Kids' Choice Awards	Favorite TV Show – Family Show	Black-ish	Nominated	
2022	Kids' Choice Awards	Favorite TV Actress - Family Show	Yara Shahidi	Nominated	
2023	Kids' Choice Awards	Favorite TV Actress - Family Show	Tracee Ellis Ross	Nominated	

== MTV Movie & TV Awards ==
Year	Award	Category	Nominee(s)	Result	Ref.
2017	MTV Movie & TV Awards	Best American Story	Black-ish	Won	
2017	MTV Movie & TV Awards	Best Musical Moment	Cast performs "Freedom" – Black-ish	Nominated	

== NAACP Image Awards ==
Year	Award	Category	Nominee(s)	Result	Ref.
2015	NAACP Image Awards	Outstanding Comedy Series	Black-ish	Won	
2015	NAACP Image Awards	Outstanding Actor in a Comedy Series	Anthony Anderson	Won	
2015	NAACP Image Awards	Outstanding Actress in a Comedy Series	Tracee Ellis Ross	Won	
2015	NAACP Image Awards	Outstanding Supporting Actress in a Comedy Series	Yara Shahidi	Won	
2015	NAACP Image Awards	Outstanding Supporting Actor in a Comedy Series	Laurence Fishburne	Won	
2015	NAACP Image Awards	Outstanding Supporting Actor in a Comedy Series	Marcus Scribner	Nominated	
2016	NAACP Image Award	Outstanding Comedy Series	Black-ish	Won	
2016	NAACP Image Award	Outstanding Actor in a Comedy Series	Anthony Anderson	Won	
2016	NAACP Image Award	Outstanding Actress in a Comedy Series	Tracee Ellis Ross	Won	
2016	NAACP Image Award	Outstanding Supporting Actress in a Comedy Series	Marsai Martin	Won	
2016	NAACP Image Award	Outstanding Supporting Actor in a Comedy Series	Miles Brown	Nominated	
2016	NAACP Image Award	Outstanding Supporting Actor in a Comedy Series	Laurence Fishburne	Nominated	
2016	NAACP Image Award	Outstanding Performance by a Youth	Marcus Scribner	Won	
2016	NAACP Image Award	Outstanding Performance by a Youth	Miles Brown	Nominated	
2016	NAACP Image Award	Outstanding Performance by a Youth	Marsai Martin	Nominated	
2016	NAACP Image Award	Outstanding Writing in a Comedy Series	Kenya Barris for "The Word"	Won	
2017	NAACP Image Awards	Outstanding Comedy Series	Black-ish	Won	
2017	NAACP Image Awards	Outstanding Actor in a Comedy Series	Anthony Anderson	Won	
2017	NAACP Image Awards	Outstanding Actress in a Comedy Series	Tracee Ellis Ross	Won	
2017	NAACP Image Awards	Outstanding Supporting Actor in a Comedy Series	Laurence Fishburne	Won	
2017	NAACP Image Awards	Outstanding Supporting Actor in a Comedy Series	Miles Brown	Nominated	
2017	NAACP Image Awards	Outstanding Supporting Actor in a Comedy Series	Deon Cole	Nominated	
2017	NAACP Image Awards	Outstanding Supporting Actress in a Comedy Series	Marsai Martin	Nominated	
2017	NAACP Image Awards	Outstanding Directing in a Comedy Series	Anton Cropper for "God"	Nominated	
2017	NAACP Image Awards	Outstanding Directing in a Comedy Series	Anton Cropper for "Good-ish Times"	Nominated	
2017	NAACP Image Awards	Outstanding Writing in a Comedy Series	Kenya Barris for "Hope"	Won	
2017	NAACP Image Awards	Outstanding Performance by a Youth (Series, Special, Television Movie or Limited Series)	Marsai Martin	Won	
2017	NAACP Image Awards	Outstanding Performance by a Youth (Series, Special, Television Movie or Limited Series)	Miles Brown	Nominated	
2018	NAACP Image Awards	Outstanding Comedy Series	Black-ish	Won	
2018	NAACP Image Awards	Outstanding Actor in a Comedy Series	Anthony Anderson	Won	
2018	NAACP Image Awards	Outstanding Actress in a Comedy Series	Tracee Ellis Ross	Won	
2018	NAACP Image Awards	Outstanding Supporting Actress in a Comedy Series	Marsai Martin	Won	
2018	NAACP Image Awards	Outstanding Directing in a Comedy Series	Anton Cropper for "Juneteenth"	Won	
2018	NAACP Image Awards	Outstanding Performance by a Youth (Series, Special, Television Movie or Limited Series)	Marsai Martin	Nominated	
2021	NAACP Image Awards	Outstanding Comedy Series	Black-ish	Nominated	
2021	NAACP Image Awards	Outstanding Actor in a Comedy Series	Anthony Anderson	Won	
2021	NAACP Image Awards	Outstanding Actress in a Comedy Series	Tracee Ellis Ross	Nominated	
2021	NAACP Image Awards	Outstanding Supporting Actor in a Comedy Series	Deon Cole	Won	
2021	NAACP Image Awards	Outstanding Supporting Actor in a Comedy Series	Laurence Fishburne	Nominated	
2021	NAACP Image Awards	Outstanding Supporting Actress in a Comedy Series	Marsai Martin	Won	
2021	NAACP Image Awards	Outstanding Supporting Actress in a Comedy Series	Jenifer Lewis	Nominated	
2021	NAACP Image Awards	Outstanding Directing in a Comedy Series	Anya Adams for "Hair Day"	Won	
2021	NAACP Image Awards	Outstanding Directing in a Comedy Series	Eric Dean Seaton for "Our Wedding Dre"	Nominated	
2021	NAACP Image Awards	Outstanding Performance by a Youth	Marsai Martin	Won	
2021	NAACP Image Awards	Outstanding Performance by a Youth	Miles Brown	Nominated	

== Peabody Award ==
Year	Award	Category	Nominee(s)	Result	Ref.
2015	Peabody Award	Entertainment honoree	Black-ish	Won	

== People's Choice Awards ==
Year	Award	Category	Nominee(s)	Result	Ref.
2015	People's Choice Awards	Favorite New TV Comedy	Black-ish	Nominated	

== Primetime Emmy Award ==
Year	Award	Category	Nominee(s)	Result	Ref.
2015	Primetime Emmy Awards	Outstanding Lead Actor in a Comedy Series	Anthony Anderson (for “Sex, Lies and Vasectomies”)	Nominated	
2016	Primetime Emmy Awards	Outstanding Comedy Series	Black-ish (for “The Word,” “Rock, Paper, Scissors Gun,” “Keeping Up with the Johnsons,” “Hope,” “Any Given Saturday,” “Daddy Dre-Care”)	Nominated	
2016	Primetime Emmy Awards	Outstanding Lead Actor in a Comedy Series	Anthony Anderson (for “Hope”)	Nominated	
2016	Primetime Emmy Awards	Outstanding Lead Actress in a Comedy Series	Tracee Ellis Ross (for “Sink or Swim”)	Nominated	
2017	Primetime Emmy Awards	Outstanding Comedy Series	Black-ish (for “Being Bow-Racial,” “40 Acres and a Vote,” “God,” “Lemons,” “Name Game,” “One Angry Man”)	Nominated	
2017	Primetime Emmy Awards	Outstanding Lead Actor in a Comedy Series	Anthony Anderson (for “Lemons”)	Nominated	
2017	Primetime Emmy Awards	Outstanding Lead Actress in a Comedy Series	Tracee Ellis Ross (for “Being Bow-Racial”)	Nominated	
2017	Primetime Emmy Awards	Outstanding Guest Actress in a Comedy Series	Wanda Sykes (for “Lemons”)	Nominated	
2018	Primetime Emmy Awards	Outstanding Comedy Series	Black-ish (for “Juneteenth,” “Mother Nature,” “First and Last,” “Advance to Go (Collect $200),” “R-E-S-P-E-C-T,” “Blue Valentine”)	Nominated	
2018	Primetime Emmy Awards	Outstanding Lead Actor in a Comedy Series	Anthony Anderson (for “Advance to Go (Collect $200)”)	Nominated	
2018	Primetime Emmy Awards	Outstanding Lead Actress in a Comedy Series	Tracee Ellis Ross (“Elder. Scam.”)	Nominated	
2018	Primetime Emmy Awards	Outstanding Guest Actress in a Comedy Series	Wanda Sykes (for “Juneteenth”)	Nominated	
2018	Primetime Emmy Awards	Outstanding Contemporary Costumes	Michelle Cole, Delores Ybarra and Devon Patterson (for “Juneteenth”)	Nominated	
2019	Primetime Emmy Awards	Outstanding Lead Actor in a Comedy Series	Anthony Anderson (for “Purple Rain”)	Nominated	
2019	Primetime Emmy Awards	Outstanding Contemporary Costumes	Michelle Cole and Devon Patterson (for “Purple Rain”)	Nominated	
2020	Primetime Emmy Awards	Outstanding Lead Actor in a Comedy Series	Anthony Anderson (for “Love, Boat”)	Nominated	
2020	Primetime Emmy Awards	Outstanding Lead Actress in a Comedy Series	Tracee Ellis Ross (for “Kid Life Crisis”)	Nominated	
2020	Primetime Emmy Awards	Outstanding Contemporary Costumes	Michelle R. Cole and Juliann DeVito (for “Hair Day”)	Nominated	
2020	Primetime Emmy Awards	Outstanding Contemporary Hairstyling	Araxi Lindsey, Robert C. Mathews III and Enoch Williams (for “Hair Day”)	Won	
2021	Primetime Emmy Awards	Outstanding Comedy Series	Black-ish	Nominated	
2021	Primetime Emmy Awards	Outstanding Lead Actor in a Comedy Series	Anthony Anderson	Nominated	
2021	Primetime Emmy Awards	Outstanding Lead Actress in a Comedy Series	Tracee Ellis Ross (for “Babes in Boyland”)	Nominated	
2021	Primetime Emmy Awards	Outstanding Contemporary Costumes	Michelle R. Cole and Juliann M. Smith DeVito (for “Our Wedding Dre”)	Nominated	
2021	Primetime Emmy Awards	Outstanding Contemporary Hairstyling	Nena Ross Davis, Stacey Morris, Ka'Maura Eley, Enoch Williams IV, Robert C. Mathews III, Marcia Hamilton (for “Our Wedding Dre”)	Nominated	
2021	Primetime Emmy Awards	Outstanding Character Voice-Over Performance	Stacey Abrams (for “Election Special (Part 2)”)	Nominated	
2022	Primetime Emmy Awards	Outstanding Contemporary Costumes	Michelle R. Cole, Stanley Vance Hudson, Suzanne M. Bantit (for "That's What Friends Are For")	Nominated	
2022	Primetime Emmy Awards	Outstanding Contemporary Hairstyling	Nena Ross Davis, Debra Brown, Stacey Morris, Shirlena Allen, Dominique Evans, Lionel Brown (for "That's What Friends Are For")	Nominated	

== Producers Guild of America Awards ==
Year	Award	Category	Nominee(s)	Result	Ref.
2017	Producers Guild of America Awards	Episodic Television, Comedy	Producers of Black-ish	Nominated	

== Rockie Awards ==
Year	Award	Category	Nominee(s)	Result	Ref.
2017	Rockie Awards	Comedy Series: English Language	Black-ish	Nominated	

== Satellite Awards ==
Year	Award	Category	Nominee(s)	Result	Ref.
2019	Satellite Awards	Best Musical or Comedy Series	Black-ish	Nominated	
2019	Satellite Awards	Best Actor in a Musical or Comedy Series	Anthony Anderson	Nominated	
2019	Satellite Awards	Best Actress in a Musical or Comedy Series	Tracee Ellis Ross	Nominated	

== Screen Actors Guild Awards ==
Year	Award	Category	Nominee(s)	Result	Ref.
2017	Screen Actors Guild Awards	Outstanding Performance by an Ensemble in a Comedy Series	Anthony Anderson, Miles Brown, Deon Cole, Laurence Fishburne, Jenifer Lewis, Peter Mackenzie, Marsai Martin, Jeff Meacham, Tracee Ellis Ross, Marcus Scribner, Yara Shahidi	Nominated	
2017	Screen Actors Guild Awards	Outstanding Performance by a Male Actor in a Comedy Series	Anthony Anderson	Nominated	
2018	Screen Actors Guild Awards	Outstanding Performance by an Ensemble in a Comedy Series	Anthony Anderson, Miles Brown, Deon Cole, Laurence Fishburne, Jenifer Lewis, Peter Mackenzie, Marsai Martin, Jeff Meacham, Tracee Ellis Ross, Marcus Scribner, Yara Shahidi	Nominated	
2018	Screen Actors Guild Awards	Outstanding Performance by a Male Actor in a Comedy Series	Anthony Anderson	Nominated	

== TCA Awards ==
Year	Award	Category	Nominee(s)	Result	Ref.
2016	TCA Awards	Outstanding Achievement in Comedy	Black-ish	Won	
2017	TCA Awards	Outstanding Achievement in Comedy	Black-ish	Nominated	

== Teen Choice Awards ==
Year	Award	Category	Nominee(s)	Result	Ref.
2015	Teen Choice Awards	Choice TV Actor: Comedy	Anthony Anderson	Nominated	
2015	Teen Choice Awards	Choice TV: Breakout Star	Yara Shahidi	Nominated	
2015	Teen Choice Awards	Choice TV: Breakout Show	Black-ish	Nominated	

== Young Artist Awards ==
Year	Award	Category	Nominee(s)	Result	Ref.
2017	Young Artist Awards	Best Performance in a TV Series - Supporting Young Actor	Anthony LaPenna	Won	
2017	Young Artist Awards	Best Performance in a TV Series - Leading Young Actor	Miles Brown	Nominated	
2017	Young Artist Awards	Best Performance in a TV Series - Leading Teen Actor	Marcus Scribner	Nominated	
2017	Young Artist Awards	Best Performance in a TV Series - Leading Young Actress	Marsai Martin	Nominated	
2017	Young Artist Awards	Best Performance in a TV Series - Leading Teen Actress	Yara Shahidi	Nominated	
