= Blake Mawson =

Canadian actor and director

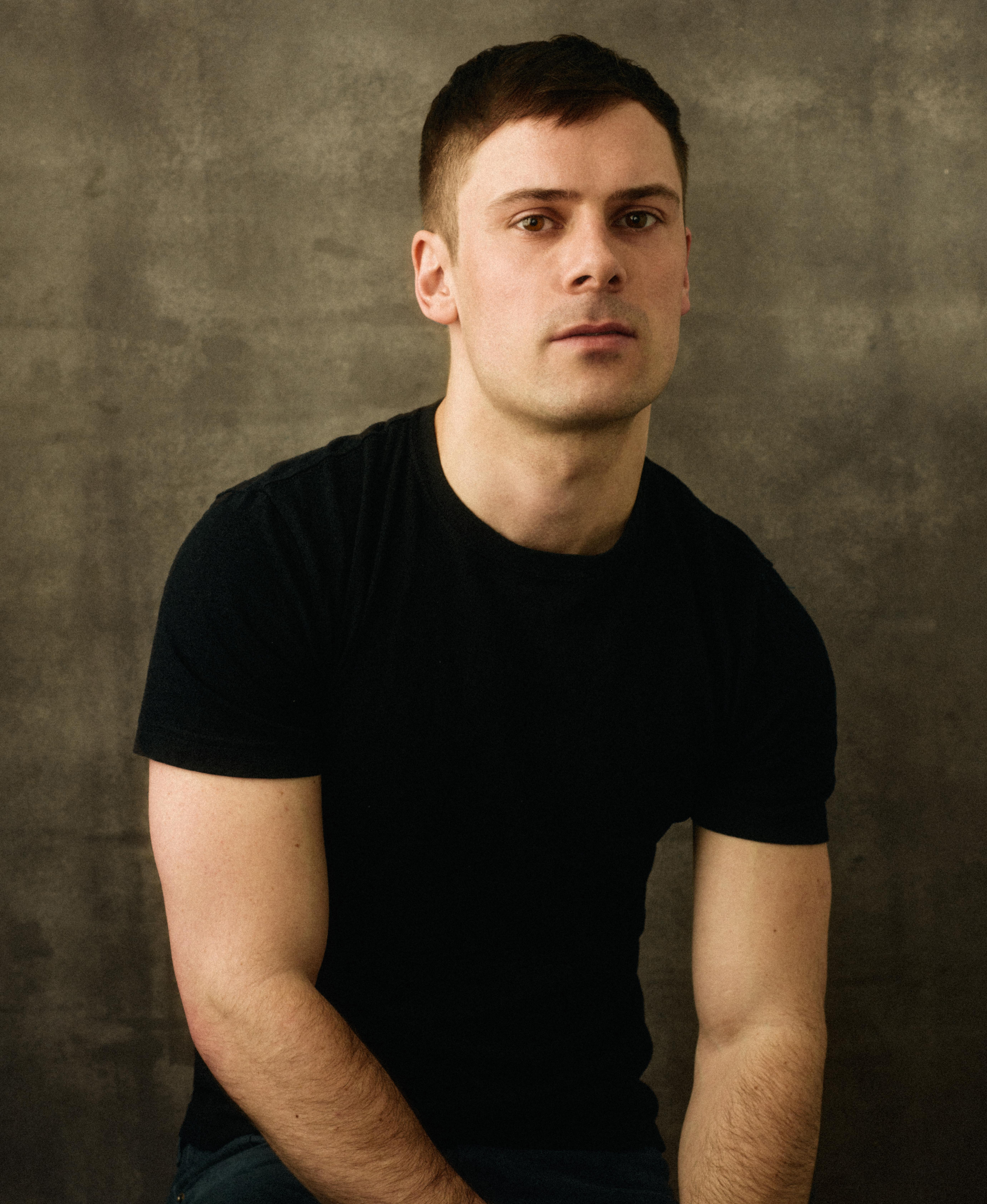
- Mawson in 2017
- Born: Blake Mawson; April 24, 1984 (age 41); Vancouver, British Columbia, Canada
- Occupations: Actor, filmmaker, screenwriter
- Years active: 2001–present
- Notable work: Pyotr495

Blake Mawson (born April 24, 1984) is a Canadian actor, filmmaker, and screenwriter. After beginning his career as an actor in the 2000s, Mawson later attracted acclaim as director of the short film Pyotr495 (2016), for which he won several accolades.

== Early life and education ==
Born and raised in Vancouver, British Columbia, Mawson is a graduate of the Directors' Lab program at the Canadian Film Centre.

== Career ==
Mawson began his career in the early 2000s as an actor and later attracted acclaim for his filmmaking work, most notably as director of the short film Pyotr495, for which he won the Emerging Artist Award at the 2016 Inside Out Film and Video Festival and received a Canadian Screen Award nomination at the 7th Canadian Screen Awards for Best Direction in a Web Program or Series.

As an actor, he had a starring role in Gore, Quebec, as well as small parts in the films X2, Freddy vs. Jason, Poison Ivy: The Secret Society and Nurse 3D, and the television series Sk8, Cold Squad, The Evidence, Blade, and The Strain.

His feature film debut, tentatively titled The Viridian, is in development and was selected for Inside Out's 2020 Finance Forum.

== Personal life ==
Mawson is out as a member of the LGBTQ+ community.
