= Hana Brady =

Czech Holocaust victim

- Born: Hana Bradyová; 16 May 1931; Prague, Czechoslovakia
- Died: 23 October 1944 (aged 13); Auschwitz-Birkenau, German-occupied Poland
- Cause of death: Hydrogen cyanide poisoning (Zyklon B)
- Other name: Hanička
- Parents: Markéta Bradyová (mother); Karel Brady (father)
- Relatives: George Brady (brother)

Hana "Hanička" Brady (born Hana Bradyová; 16 May 1931 – 23 October 1944) was a Czechoslovak Jewish girl murdered in the gas chambers of the German concentration camp at Auschwitz, located in the occupied territory of Poland, during the Holocaust. She is the subject of the 2002 non-fiction children's book Hana's Suitcase, written by Karen Levine.

== Biography ==
Hana Brady was born on 16 May 1931 in Prague, the daughter of Markéta (née Dubsky) and Karel Brady. Her family lived in Nové Město na Moravě in the Vysočina Region of Czechoslovakia. After the occupation of the whole of Czechoslovakia by Nazi Germany and the creation of the Protectorate of Bohemia and Moravia on 15 March 1939, the discriminatory Nuremberg laws began to be applied in this territory. Eight-year-old Hana and her older brother George (born Jiří Brady) watched their parents being arrested and taken away by the Nazis, and Hana and George never saw them again. Hana and George were sent to the Theresienstadt concentration camp. In 1944, Hana was deported to the Auschwitz concentration camp. While her brother survived by working as a labourer, Hana was sent to the gas chambers a few hours after her arrival on 23 October 1944. Her body was cremated with other victims in the ovens at the crematorium.

== Hana's Suitcase ==
Hana's Suitcase
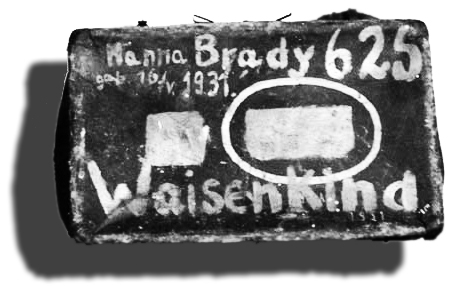
- Hana's suitcase
- Author: Karen Levine
- Audio read by: https://www.audiobooks.com/audiobook/hanas-suitcase-a-true-story/146906
- Illustrator: Karen Levine
- Language: English
- Subject: Life of Hana Brady and her suitcase
- Genre: Non-fiction
- Set in: Japan (2000); Czechoslovakia (1930s; 1938; 1939; 1940–41; 1941–42; May 1942; 1944); Czech Republic (2000)
- Publisher: Second Story Press
- Publication date: 2002
- Publication place: Canada
- Media type: Book
- Pages: 112
- Awards: National Jewish Book Award for Special Recognition
- ISBN: 9781842348413
- Dewey Decimal: 940.5318092
- Website: http://www.hanassuitcase.ca/

The story of Hana Brady first became public when Fumiko Ishioka (石岡史子, Ishioka Fumiko), a Japanese educator and director of the Japanese non-profit Tokyo Holocaust Education Resource Center, exhibited Hana's suitcase in 2000 as a relic of the concentration camp. Visiting Auschwitz in 1999, Ishioka requested a loan of children's items, things that would convey the story of the Holocaust to other children.

I went to Auschwitz in 1999 and asked for a loan of some children's items. I specifically asked [for] a shoe, this little shoe, and I asked for a suitcase.

A suitcase – that really tells you a story of how children, who used to live happily with their family, were transported and were allowed to take only one suitcase.

[The suitcase] shows this journey. I thought an object like a suitcase would be a very important item to let children in Japan learn what happened to children in the Holocaust.

— Fumiko Ishioka

The suitcase turned out to be a very capable means of telling the story of the Holocaust, reaching out to children at their level.

In Japan, the Holocaust is so far away. Some people don't see any connection whatsoever. But when they look at the suitcase, these children were really shocked.

That really helped them a lot, to focus on this one little life that was lost. They could really relate her to themselves and try to think of why such a thing could happen to a girl like her. Why the Jewish people? And why children?

They then realized there were one and a half million children.

— Fumiko Ishioka

The suitcase has large writing on it, a name and birthdate and the German word, Waisenkind (orphan). Ishioka began painstakingly researching Hana's life and eventually found her surviving brother in Canada. The story of Hana Brady and how her suitcase led Ishioka to Toronto became the subject of a CBC documentary. Karen M. Levine (born 1955), the producer of that documentary, was urged to turn the story into a book by a friend who was a publisher and whose parents were Holocaust survivors. Said Levine:

I first read about Hana's suitcase in December 2000. I read about Hana's suitcase in The Canadian Jewish News. My heart started to beat. I fell in love with the story instantly. This was a different kind of Holocaust story. It had at its centre a terrible sadness, one we all know too well. But it had a modern layer to it that lifted it up, that had connection, and even redemption.

In February 2004, Lara Brady, Hana's niece, discovered inconsistencies between the suitcase on display and the suitcase pictured with Hana's friend after the war in the 1960s. Not only did the physical suitcase appear newer than in the photographs, but the location of the handle was also reversed. In March, Fumiko and George Brady inquired about the suitcase with the director of the Auschwitz museum, who explained that a replica had been created based on the pictures after the original suitcase was destroyed in a fire in 1984, while on loan to an English exhibit in Birmingham. This fire was likely caused by arson (according to the director and police at the time).

As the museum personnel had omitted this fact when they loaned it to the Tokyo Holocaust Education Resource Center, the fact that the suitcase was a replica had gone unnoticed for several years. The family and the Center assert that even as such, the replica's contribution to the cause of human rights and peace education is not lessened by its lack of authenticity.

=== Awards and recognition ===
The 2002 book became a bestseller and received the Bank Street College of Education Flora Stieglitz Straus Award for non-fiction, the National Jewish Book Award, and several other Canadian awards for children's literature. The book received a nomination for the Governor General's Award and was selected as a final award candidate for the Norma Fleck award. It has been translated into over 20 languages and published around the world. In October 2006, the book won the Yad Vashem award, presented to George Brady at a ceremony in Jerusalem.

=== Adaptations ===
A play based on the book was written by Emil Sher. A film, Inside Hana's Suitcase, appeared in 2009. The suitcase featured in the CBC documentary was not the original, but a replica. The real suitcase, on loan, was destroyed by neo-Nazi arsonists, who set fire to a warehouse in Birmingham, England, in 1984. The audiobook is available on certain websites. In 2011, a Hebrew version of the play was staged by the Nephesh Theater in Holon, Israel.

== See also ==
- List of posthumous publications of Holocaust victims
- List of Holocaust diarists
- Anne Frank
- Yad Vashem
- Anti-Semitism
- Petr Ginz
