= Gore, Quebec (film) =

- DVD released by Entertainment One
- Directed by: Jean Benoit Lauzon
- Written by: Rick Mele
- Story by: Rick Mele; Jean Benoit Lauzon
- Produced by: Rick Mele; Kyle Fowler; Luke Madigan; Jean Benoit Lauzon
- Starring: Rick Mele; Peri Greig; Kurt Ogilvie; Andy Malone; Myrthin Stagg; Luke Madigan; Blake Mawson; Rachel Atherstone; Kate Elyse Forrest; Jean Benoit Lauzon
- Cinematography: Kyle Fowler
- Edited by: Mike Reisacher
- Music by: Dillon Baldassero
- Production company: Green Lake Films
- Distributed by: Entertainment One
- Release date: October 14, 2014 (United States)
- Running time: 79 minutes
- Country: Canada
- Language: English
- Budget: $7,000

Gore, Quebec is a 2014 Canadian horror film directed by Jean Benoit Lauzon, and written by Rick Mele.

== Plot ==
A voiceover announces that the following footage was recovered from the camera of Dave Reynolds, who, in 2011, had left Ontario to spend a weekend in his parents' cottage in Gore, Quebec with his brother Sean, and their friends Katie, Brandon, Stacey, Colin, Erin, and Mike.

When Sean and Dave reach the cottage, they find a note informing them that the alarm was tripped a week ago, but that there were no signs of vandalism or theft; they also spot someone watching them from the woods, though Sean dismisses the observer as a neighbor or a hiker. Most of the others arrive, and mention that Brandon, Mike, and Mike's blind date Amanda should be there by tomorrow afternoon. A few hours into the group's partying, Katie stumbles into the cottage bleeding, followed by a man who attacks the others, and turns Dave's camera off. The film switches to a traditional third-person narrative, and shows the intruder breaking Erin's neck with an oar.

The next day, Brandon, Mike, and Amanda drive to the cottage as a newscast announces that new DNA evidence has cast doubt on the guilt of Nick Gleason, who was convicted of five counts of first-degree murder in 2003. Upon reaching the cottage, Brandon goes for a walk, and Mike and Amanda go out on the boat, and discover Katie's body in the lake. Mike and Amanda go in search of Brandon, who has stumbled onto a series of abandoned structures, some of which are covered in graffiti that appears to have been drawn with blood. The killer mutilates and hangs Brandon, and uses his blood to add to the graffiti.

Elsewhere, the wounded Dave awakens in the woods, surrounded by the corpses of Erin and Sean, and runs off in search of aid, finding Mike and Amanda. Dave tells the two what happened to the others, and as they head back to the cottage, the killer throws an axe into Dave's back. The killer chases Amanda and Mike to where Colin and Stacey's remains are, and a flashback shows how he framed Nick Gleason for the five murders he committed in 2003.

Amanda and Mike reach the cottage, as does the killer, who axes a visiting neighbor. When the killer enters, Amanda bludgeons him with an oar, and she and Mike make a run for it, reaching Brandon's car, which they crash. The film returns to the "found footage" format used at the beginning, with the killer using Dave's camera to film the posed bodies of his victims, and the captive Mike and Amanda.

== Cast ==
- Myrthin Stagg as Amanda
- Blake Mawson as Mike
- Andy Malone as David Edward Reynolds
- Kate Elyse Forrest as Katie Farrell
- Luke Madigan as The Killer
- Jean Benoit Lauzon as Brandon
- Kurt Ogilvie as Sean Reynolds
- Peri Greig as Stacey
- Rick Mele as Colin
- Rachel Atherstone as Erin
- Rufus Crawford as Nick Gleason

== Reception ==
While Fangoria's Chris Alexander said Gore, Quebec is "as impoverished as they come, with a plot recycling just about every kids-in-the-woods horror trope known to man" he admitted that the "cheap charm is tempered by top notch craft and real, indie energy". In a review for Toronto Film Scene, William Brownridge wrote, "For $7000, this is pure indie filmmaking at its best. There's some great moments of horror, a couple of incredibly dark jokes, and an unsettling villain. It's not perfect, but is still one of the better indie horror films out there, and should be seen not only for the success of the film, but the success of the filmmaker for bringing it all together".
