= Making Overtures: The Story of a Community Orchestra =

1985 film

- Directed by: Larry Weinstein
- Produced by: Barbara Willis Sweete
- Cinematography: John Walker
- Edited by: Anthony Sloan
- Production company: Rhombus Media
- Distributed by: TVOntario
- Release date: 1985
- Running time: 28 minutes
- Country: Canada
- Language: English

Making Overtures: The Story of a Community Orchestra is a 1985 Canadian short documentary film directed by Larry Weinstein. It was nominated for an Academy Award for Best Documentary Short.
