= The Nest (2018 film) =

- Le nid
- Directed by: David Paradis
- Written by: Bruno Maltais; David Paradis
- Produced by: Émilie André; David Paradis
- Starring: Pierre-Luc Brillant; Isabelle Blais
- Cinematography: Claude Rouleau
- Edited by: Jean-François Blanchet
- Music by: Pierre-Luc Brillant
- Release date: July 25, 2018 (Fantasia)
- Running time: 84 minutes
- Country: Canada
- Language: French

The Nest (French: Le nid) is a Canadian psychological thriller film, directed by David Paradis and released in 2018. The film stars Pierre-Luc Brillant as Pierre-Luc, an actor who agrees to his girlfriend Isabelle's (Isabelle Blais) request that he spend five days confined to a locked room, with no contact with the outside world except webcam conversations with her.

The film premiered in July 2018 at the Fantasia International Film Festival, where it won the Barry Convex Award for Best Canadian Feature.

The film received two Canadian Screen Award nominations, for Best Sound Editing and the John Dunning Best First Feature Award, at the 7th Canadian Screen Awards in 2019.
