= Marc Bisaillon =

Canadian film director and screenwriter

Marc Bisaillon is a Canadian film director and screenwriter from Quebec. He is most noted for his 2018 film With Love (L'Amour), for which he received a Canadian Screen Award nomination for Best Original Screenplay at the 7th Canadian Screen Awards in 2019.

He previously directed the films S.P.C.E., La lâcheté and La vérité, and wrote the screenplay for Paul Thinel's film Les immortels.

He is also a musician with the band Les 3/4 Putains.
