= What Walaa Wants =

- Directed by: Christy Garland
- Produced by: Matt Code; Christy Garland; Anne Köhncke; Justine Pimlott
- Starring: Walaa Khaled Fawzy Tanji
- Cinematography: Christy Garland; Hanna Abu Saada
- Edited by: Michael Aaglund; Graeme Ring
- Music by: Tom Third
- Production companies: Murmur Media; Final Cut for Real
- Distributed by: National Film Board of Canada
- Release date: February 17, 2018 (Berlin)
- Running time: 89 minutes
- Countries: Canada; Denmark
- Language: Arabic

What Walaa Wants is a Canadian documentary film, directed by Christy Garland and released in 2018. The film profiles Walaa Khaled Fawzy Tanji, a rebellious young woman who is pursuing a dream of becoming one of the very few female officers with the Palestinian National Security Forces.

== Awards and nominations ==
In December 2018, the Toronto International Film Festival named the film to its annual year-end Canada's Top Ten list. It won the festival's Special Jury Prize in the Canadian Feature Documentary category.

The director was also nominated for both the Crystal Bear for "Generation 14+ - Best Film" and Glasshütte Original Documentary Award during the 2018 Berlin International Film Festival. Director was also nominated for the Audience Award during the 2018 Edinburgh International Film Festival.

The film received a Canadian Screen Award nomination for Best Feature Length Documentary at the 7th Canadian Screen Awards in 2019, Garland received a nomination for Best Cinematography in a Documentary, and Michael Aaglund and Graeme Ring received nominations for Best Editing in a Documentary.

The film was produced by Christy Garland, Justine Pimlott and Anne Köhncke.
