= Pyotr495 =

2016 horror film

- Directed by: Blake Mawson
- Written by: Blake Mawson
- Produced by: Sasha Fisher; Natalie Novak; Cam McLauchlin
- Starring: Alex Ozerov; Max Rositsan; Juliana Semenova
- Cinematography: Catherine Lutes
- Edited by: Cam McLauchlin
- Music by: Konrad Black
- Production company: Drive-In Keep Out Productions
- Distributed by: Border2Border Entertainment
- Release date: 2016
- Running time: 15 minutes
- Country: Canada
- Language: Russian

Pyotr495 is a Canadian short horror film, directed by Blake Mawson and released in 2016. An exploration of anti-LGBT violence in Russia, the film stars Alex Ozerov as Pyotr, a young gay man in Moscow who is lured into a dangerous situation by anti-gay extremists but turns the tables on them with a dark secret that turns them into the prey.

== Background ==
The film was funded partially by a crowdfunding campaign on Indiegogo in 2015.

Mawson won the Emerging Artist Award at the 2016 Inside Out Film and Video Festival. After the film was released to digital platforms in 2017, it received two Canadian Screen Award nominations at the 7th Canadian Screen Awards, for Best Lead Performance in a Web Program or Series (Ozerov) and Best Direction in a Web Program or Series (Mawson). Ozerov won the award for Best Lead Performance.

The film was subsequently included in Possession, the 16th volume of the Boys on Film anthology of gay-themed short film DVDs.
