= Rufus Crawford =

American actor and football player (born 1955)

No. 34
- Position: Running back

Personal information
- Born: May 21, 1955 (age 71); Gastonia, North Carolina, U.S.
- Listed height: 5 ft 10 in (1.78 m)
- Listed weight: 180 lb (82 kg)

Career information
- High school: Hunter Huss
- College: Virginia State
- NFL draft: 1978: undrafted

Career history
- Seattle Seahawks (1978); Hamilton Tiger-Cats (1979–1985)

Awards and highlights
- Jeff Russel Memorial Trophy (1984); CFL East All-Star (1981); Canadian football yardage record

Career NFL statistics
- Rushing yards: 19
- Rushing average: 2.4
- Receptions: 4
- Receiving yards: 25
- Stats at Pro Football Reference

Rufus Crawford (born May 21, 1955) is an American actor and former football player who was a running back for the Hamilton Tiger-Cats from 1979 through 1985. He broke the Canadian Football League (CFL) yardage record which had stood for 28 years. He started his career in the National Football League (NFL) with the Seattle Seahawks.

== Filmography ==
=== Film ===
Year	Title	Role	Notes
1995	Catwalk	TV host	Documentary
1996	Lethal Tender	Cop #1	
2000	Jill Rips	Man in bar	
2000	Left Behind: The Movie	Security Guard #1	
2002	Paid in Full	Tommy	
2005	Cinderella Man	Lewis Coach	
2007	The Tracey Fragments	Bus cop	
2009	The Boondock Saints II: All Saints Day	Pedestrian	
2010	A Beginner's Guide to Endings	Referee	
2012	The Samaritan	Construction foreman	
2014	Gore, Quebec	Nick Gleason	
2018	Anon	Herbert	Uncredited

=== Television ===
Year	Title	Role	Notes
1992	Catwalk	Sid Lee	Episode: "First Gig"
1996	Due South	Museum Guard	Episode: "The Mask"
1996	Conundrum	Cop #2	Television film
1996	Beyond the Call	Thibodeaux	Television film
1998	Naked City: A Killer Christmas	Paramedic	Television film
1998	Exhibit A: Secrets of Forensic Science	Len	Episode: "The Perfect Heist"
1998, 2000	Twitch City	Sharpshooter 2 / Good cop	2 episodes
1999	The Famous Jett Jackson	Coach	Episode: "Front Page"
1999	Coming Unglued	Officer	Television film
1999	Dangerous Evidence: The Lori Jackson Story	2nd Trial Judge No 3	Television film
1999	Twice in a Lifetime	Officer Perez	Episode: "Double Exposure"
1999	At the Mercy of a Stranger	Warrant cop	Television film
1999, 2000	The Wonderful World of Disney	Assistant Manager / Referee	2 episodes
2000	Alley Cats Strike	Ken's dad	Television film
2000	Harlan County War	Bill Worthington	Television film
2000	Who Killed Atlanta's Children?	Terrorist #1	Television film
2002	The Red Sneakers	Chargers' coach	Television film
2002	Keep the Faith, Baby	A. Philip Randolph	Television film
2002	Crossed Over	Officer	Television film
2002	Whitewash: The Clarence Brandley Story	Dennis Brandley	Television film
2002	Charms for the Easy Life	Lynched man	Television film
2003	Deacons for Defense	Deacon	Television film
2004	Crown Heights	Mr. Moses	Television film
2005	Sue Thomas: F.B.Eye	Parking Attendant	Episode: "Spy Games"
2011	Breakout Kings	Man walking dog	Episode: "Pilot"
2011	Certain Prey	Strip joint owner	Television film
2016	Murdoch Mysteries	Morton Witsel	Episode: "Once Upon a Murdoch Christmas"
2017	Designated Survivor	Uniformed police chief	Episode: "Lazarus"
2018	Imposters	Jerry Cook	Episode: "Old Unresolved Shit"
2020	Condor	Man (Soup Kitchen)	Episode: "A Former KGB Man"
