= Christy Garland =

Director and filmmaker

Christy Garland is a Canadian documentary filmmaker, originally from London, Ontario and based professionally in Toronto. She is most noted for her 2018 film What Walaa Wants.

A graduate of the film studies program at Ryerson University, she worked for various film and television studios as a story analyst and assistant director, and made a handful of narrative short films, before launching her own production company, Murmur Films, to make documentary films.

She made her feature documentary debut in 2012 with The Bastard Sings the Sweetest Song, and followed up in 2016 with Cheer Up.

What Walaa Wants was a Canadian Screen Award nominee for Best Feature Length Documentary, and Garland received a nomination for Best Cinematography in a Documentary, at the 7th Canadian Screen Awards in 2019.

She is the partner of film and television composer Tom Third.

== Filmography ==
- Blind Spot - 1997
- Dual Citizen - 2001
- Doormat - 2008
- The Bastard Sings the Sweetest Song - 2012
- Cheer Up - 2016
- What Walaa Wants - 2018
