= Save Me (web series) =

Canadian comedy-drama web series

Save Me is a Canadian comedy-drama web series, which debuted on the Canadian Broadcasting Corporation's CBC Comedy web platform in 2017. The series stars Fab Filippo as Goldie, a paramedic who acts as a first responder in a different medical emergency each episode.

The show's cast also includes Amy Matysio, Suresh John, Loretta Yu, John Bourgeois, Emma Hunter, Lucky Onyekachi Ejim, Brent Carver, Conrad Coates and Dov Tiefenbach.

Hunter won the Canadian Screen Award for Best Actress in a Web Program or Series at the 6th Canadian Screen Awards. CBC Television ran the series terrestrially in 2018, following which it received five further Canadian Screen Award nominations in the television categories at the 7th Canadian Screen Awards, for Best Actor in a Drama Program or Limited Series (Filippo), Best Actress in a Drama Program or Limited Series (Matysio), Best Supporting Actor in a Drama Program or Limited Series (Carver), Best Direction in a Drama Program or Limited Series (Filippo) and Best Writing in a Drama Program or Limited Series (Filippo).

The second season premiered on CBC Gem in 2019.

== Episodes ==
=== Season 1 (2017) ===
No. overall	No. in season	Title	Directed by	Written by	Original release date
1	1	"H.B.D."	Unknown	Unknown	April 10, 2017
2	2	"Neck Trauma"	Unknown	Unknown	April 10, 2017
3	3	"Possible Anaphylaxis"	Unknown	Unknown	April 10, 2017
4	4	"Self-Inflicted Puncture Wound"	Unknown	Unknown	April 10, 2017
5	5	"Trauma Related to Sleepwalking"	Unknown	Unknown	April 10, 2017
6	6	"Syncope"	Unknown	Unknown	April 10, 2017
7	7	"Injuries Due to Distracted Walking"	Unknown	Unknown	April 10, 2017
8	8	"Hypovolemia"	Unknown	Unknown	April 10, 2017
9	9	"Cardiac Arrest"	Unknown	Unknown	April 10, 2017
10	10	"Code 5"	Unknown	Unknown	April 10, 2017

=== Season 2 (2019) ===
No. overall	No. in season	Title	Directed by	Written by	Original release date
11	1	"First Call"	Unknown	Unknown	June 27, 2019
12	2	"Everything He's Done Wrong"	Unknown	Unknown	June 27, 2019
13	3	"Bar is Low"	Unknown	Unknown	June 27, 2019
14	4	"Animl"	Unknown	Unknown	June 27, 2019
15	5	"Boyfriend Material"	Unknown	Unknown	June 27, 2019
16	6	"Birdie's End"	Unknown	Unknown	June 27, 2019
