= With Love (2018 film) =

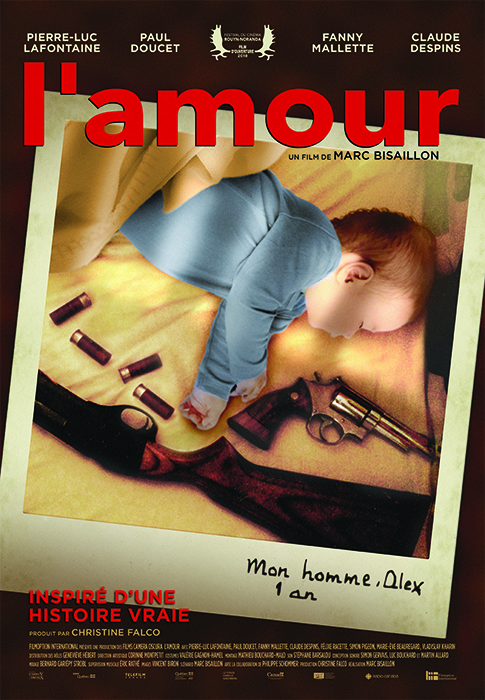
- Film poster
- French: L'Amour
- Directed by: Marc Bisaillon
- Written by: Marc Bisaillon
- Produced by: Christine Falco
- Starring: Pierre-Luc Lafontaine; Paul Doucet; Fanny Mallette
- Cinematography: Vincent Biron
- Edited by: Mathieu Bouchard-Malo
- Production company: Films Camera Oscura
- Distributed by: Filmoption
- Release date: October 28, 2018
- Running time: 95 minutes
- Country: Canada
- Language: French

With Love (French: L'Amour) is a Canadian thriller film, directed by Marc Bisaillon and released in 2018. Based on the 2006 murder spree of Stephen Marshall, the film stars Pierre-Luc Lafontaine as Alex, a young man who travels to Maine under the pretext of visiting his father (Paul Doucet), but is instead planning to use the state's sex offender registry to track down and murder sex offenders; meanwhile, his mother Rose (Fanny Mallette), having awareness of his intentions, travels to Maine to try to stop him.

The film premiered at the Festival du cinéma international en Abitibi-Témiscamingue in October 2018.

The film received three Canadian Screen Award nominations at the 7th Canadian Screen Awards in 2019, for Best Supporting Actor (Doucet), Best Original Screenplay (Bisaillon) and Best Overall Sound (Stéphane Barsalou and Bernard Gariépy Strobl).

== Cast ==
- Pierre-Luc Lafontaine as Alex
- Paul Doucet as J.J. Marchand
- Fanny Mallette as Rose Maher
- Claude Despins as Laurent Maher
- Félixe Racette as Anna
- Simon Pigeon as David
- Zakary Auclair as Alex (13 years old)
- Vladislav Kharin as Alex (7 years old)
- Matthew Kabwe as Sergeant Milo
- Marie-Ève Beauregard as Romy
- Marceline St-Pierre Allaire as RCMP officer
- Sylvio Archambault as Restaurant Manager
- Freddy Bessa as Policeman #2
- Juliette Bisaillon as Alicia
- Marc-André Boire as Brian
- Sylvain Brousseau as policeman Idaho #2
- Stéphane Castellon as Eric's father
- Sonia Chénier as Alicia's mother
