= Dreaming of a Jewish Christmas =

- Directed by: Larry Weinstein
- Written by: Jason Charters
- Produced by: Liam Romalis; Jason Charters
- Cinematography: Kiarash Sadigh
- Edited by: David New
- Music by: Aaron Davis
- Production company: Riddle Films
- Distributed by: CBC Television
- Release date: December 6, 2017
- Running time: 52 minutes
- Country: Canada
- Language: English

Dreaming of a Jewish Christmas is a Canadian documentary film, directed by Larry Weinstein and released in 2017. The film profiles a number of musicians, including Irving Berlin, Mel Tormé, Jay Livingston, Ray Evans, Gloria Shayne Baker and Johnny Marks, who made a mark on contemporary culture by writing many of the most beloved Christmas music standards even though they were Jewish rather than Christian; it focuses, in particular, on the way these songwriters helped to create the 20th-century shift from traditional liturgical Christmas music toward contemporary pop songs that address Christmas through universal themes of love, joy, peace, family and the sensual pleasures of winter rather than explicitly religious imagery. The young Larry is portrayed by Decker Williams in this documentary in a scene which takes place in a Chinese restaurant that he and his family visited on December 25 in about 1961.

The film incorporates interview segments with figures such as musician Ben Sidran, comedians Jackie Mason and Mark Breslin and music writers Rob Bowman, Ophira Eisenberg and Robert Harris, interspersed with musical performances of some of the songs being discussed. Performing musicians include Steven Page, Tom Wilson, The Lemon Bucket Orkestra, David Wall, Dione Taylor, Kevin Breit and Aviva Chernick.

The film premiered on CBC Television in December 2017, and received further broadcasts on the Documentary Channel. In the United States the film has been broadcast by some PBS stations, and shown at Jewish film festivals.

Weinstein won the Canadian Screen Award for Best Direction in a Documentary Program at the 7th Canadian Screen Awards. The film was nominated for Best Biography or Arts Documentary Program or Series, Best Sound in a Non-Fiction Program or Series (Gary Vaughan and Richard Spence-Thomas) and Best Writing in a Documentary Program (Jason Charters). At the 46th International Emmy Awards, the film was a shortlisted nominee for Best Arts Programming.

== Songlist ==
1. "Winter Wonderland" (English version) - performed by Gaston Poon, Franc-Anton Harwart and the waiters
2. "The Christmas Song" - lead vocals by Dione Taylor
3. "A Holly Jolly Christmas" - performed by Roger Feng, the cooks and the lion dancers
4. "Silver Bells" - lead vocals by Steven Page
5. "Rudolph the Red-Nosed Reindeer" - performed by Tom Wilson and the Lemon Bucket Orkestra
6. "Do You Hear What I Hear?" - sung by Aviva Chernick
7. "Winter Wonderland Reprise" - Yiddish vocals by David Wall with the waiters' backing vocals

== See also ==
- Jews and Christmas
- Jewish-American patronage of Chinese restaurants
