= Cinema Audio Society Awards 2016 =

US film and television awards ceremony

53rd CAS Awards

February 18, 2017

Motion Picture – Live Action:
La La Land

Motion Picture – Animated:
Finding Dory

The 53rd Cinema Audio Society Awards were held on February 18, 2017, in the Bunker Hill Ballroom of the OMNI Los Angeles Hotel at California Plaza, Los Angeles, honoring outstanding achievements in sound mixing in film and television of 2016.

== Winners and nominees ==
Outstanding Achievement in Sound Mixing for a Motion Picture – Live Action	Outstanding Achievement in Sound Mixing for a Motion Picture – Animated
La La Land – Production Mixer – Steven Morrow, CAS; Re-recording Mixer – Andy Nelson, CAS; Re-recording Mixer – Ai-Ling Lee; Scoring Mixer – Nicholai Baxter; ADR Mixer – David Betancourt; Foley Mixer – James Ashwill; Doctor Strange – Production Mixer – John Midgley, CAS; Re-recording Mixer – Tom Johnson; Re-recording Mixer –Juan Peralta; Scoring Mixer – Peter Cobbin; ADR Mixer – Doc Kane, CAS; Foley Mixer – Scott Curtis; Hacksaw Ridge – Production Mixer – Peter Grace; Re-recording Mixer – Kevin O'Connell, CAS; Re-recording Mixer – Andy Wright; Re-recording Mixer – Robert Mackenzie; Scoring Mixer – Daniel Kresco; ADR Mixer – Diego Ruiz; Foley Mixer – Alex Francis; Rogue One: A Star Wars Story – Production Mixer – Stuart Wilson; Re-recording Mixer – Christopher Scarabosio; Re-recording Mixer – David Parker; Scoring Mixer – Joel Iwataki; ADR Mixer – Nick Kray; Foley Mixer – Frank Rinella; Sully – Production Mixer – Jose Antonio Garcia; Re-recording Mixer – John Reitz; Re-recording Mixer – Tom Ozanich; Scoring Mixer – Bobby Fernandez; ADR Mixer – Thomas J. O'Connell; Foley Mixer – James Ashwill	Finding Dory – Original Dialogue Mixer – Doc Kane, CAS; Re-recording Mixer – Nathan Nance; Re-recording Mixer – Michael Semanick, CAS; Scoring Mixer – Thomas Vicari, CAS; Foley Mixer – Scott Curtis; Kubo and the Two Strings – Original Dialogue Mixer – Carlos Sotolongo; Re-recording Mixer – Tim Chau; Re-recording Mixer – Tim LeBlanc; Scoring Mixer – Nick Wollage; Foley Mixer – Darrin Mann; Moana – Original Dialogue Mixer – Paul McGrath; Re-recording Mixer – David E. Fluhr, CAS; Re-recording Mixer – Gabriel Guy, CAS; Scoring Mixer – David Boucher; Foley Mixer – Scott Curtis; The Secret Life of Pets – Original Dialogue Mixer – Carlos Sotolongo; Re-recording Mixer – Gary A. Rizzo, CAS; Re-recording Mixer – David Accord; Scoring Mixer – Frank Wolf; Foley Mixer – Jason Butler; Zootopia – Original Dialogue Mixer – Paul McGrath; Re-recording Mixer – David E. Fluhr, CAS; Re-recording Mixer – Gabriel Guy, CAS; Scoring Mixer – Joel Iwataki; Foley Mixer – Scott Curtis
Outstanding Achievement in Sound Mixing for a Motion Picture – Documentary	Outstanding Achievement in Sound Mixing for a Television Movie or Mini-Series
The Music of Strangers: Yo-Yo Ma and The Silk Road Ensemble – Production Mixer – Dimitri Tisseyre; Production Mixer – Dennis Hamlin; Re-recording Mixer – Peter Horner; 13th – Re-recording Mixer – Jeffrey Perkins; Eat That Question: Frank Zappa in His Own Words – Re-recording Mixer – Mark Fragstein; Re-recording Mixer – Marvin Keil; Re-recording Mixer – Armelle Mahé; Gleason – Re-recording Mixer – Mark A. Rozett, CAS; Re-recording Mixer – James Scullion; O.J.: Made in America – Re-recording Mixer – Keith Hodne; Re-recording Mixer – Eric Di Stefano	The People v. O. J. Simpson: American Crime Story – Production Mixer – John Bauman; Re-recording Mixer –Joe Earle, CAS; Re-recording Mixer – Doug Andham, CAS; ADR Mixer – Judah Getz; Foley Mixer –John Guentner; 11.22.63 – "The Rabbit Hole" – Production Mixer – John J. Thomson; Re-recording Mixer – Pete Elia, CAS; Re-recording Mixer – Kevin Roache, CAS; ADR Mixer – Judah Getz; Foley Mixer – Brett Voss, CAS; Black Mirror: San Junipero – Production Mixer – Adrian Bell; Re-recording Mixer – Martin Jensen; Foley Mixer – Philip Clements; ADR Mixer – Rory de Carteret; The Night Manager – "Episode 1" – Production Mixer –Aitor Berenguer; Re-recording Mixer – Howard Bargroff; Sherlock: The Abominable Bride – Production Mixer – John Mooney, CAS; Re-recording Mixer – Howard Bargoroff; Scoring Mixer – Nick Wollage; ADR Mixer – Peter Gleaves, CAS; Foley Mixer – Jamie Talbutt
Outstanding Achievement in Sound Mixing for Television Series – One Hour	Outstanding Achievement in Sound Mixing for Television Series – Half Hour
Game of Thrones – "Battle of the Bastards" – Production Mixer – Ronan Hill, CAS; Re-recording Mixer – Onnalee Blank, CAS; Re-recording Mixer – Mathew Waters, CAS; ADR Mixer – Richard Dyer, CAS; Foley Mixer – Brett Voss, CAS; Better Call Saul – "Klick" – Production Mixer – Phillip W. Palmer, CAS; Re-recording Mixer – Larry B. Benjamin, CAS; Re-recording Mixer – Kevin Valentine; ADR Mixer – Matt Hovland; Foley Mixer – David Michael Torres; Mr. Robot – "eps2.8_h1dden-pr0cess.axx" – Production Mixer – William Sarokin, CAS; Re-recording Mixer – John W. Cook II, CAS; Re-recording Mixer – Bill Freesh, CAS; ADR Mixer – Beaux Nyguard; Foley Mixer – Mike Marino; Stranger Things – "Chapter Seven: The Bathtub" – Production Mixer – Chris Durfy, CAS; Re-recording Mixer – Joe Barnett; Re-recording Mixer – Adam Jenkins; ADR Mixer – Judah Getz; Foley Mixer – John Guentner; Westworld – "The Original" – Production Mixer – John Pritchett, CAS; Re-recording Mixer – Keith Rogers, CAS; Re-recording Mixer – Scott Weber; ADR Mixer – Mark Kondracki; Foley Mixer – Geordy Sincavage	Modern Family – "The Storm" – Production Mixer – Stephen A. Tibbo, CAS; Re-recording Mixer – Dean Okrand, CAS; Re-recording Mixer – Brian R. Harman, CAS; blackish – "God" – Production Mixer – Tom N. Stasinis, CAS; Re-recording Mixer – Peter J. Nusbaum, CAS; Re-recording Mixer – Whitney Purple; Silicon Valley – "Daily Active Users" – Production Mixer – Benjamin A. Patrick, CAS; Re-recording Mixer – Elmo Ponsdomenech; Re-recording Mixer – Todd Beckett; Transparent – "Exciting and New" – Production Mixer – Sam Hamer, CAS; Re-recording Mixer – Andy D'addario; Re-recording Mixer – Gary Gegan; Veep – "Congressional Ball" – Production Mixer – William MacPherson, CAS; Re-recording Mixer – John W. Cook II, CAS; Re-recording Mixer – Bill Freesh, CAS
Outstanding Achievement in Sound Mixing for Television Non Fiction, Variety or Music – Series or Specials
Grease: Live – Production Mixer – J. Mark King; Music Mixer – Biff Dawes; Playback and SFX Mixer – Eric Johnston; Pro Tools Playback Music Mixer – Pablo Mungula; Anthony Bourdain: Parts Unknown – "Hanoi" – Re-Recording Mixer – Benny Mouthon, CAS; Deadliest Catch – "The Widowmaker (Part 1)" – Re-Recording Mixer – Bob Bronow, CAS; Mars – "Novo Mundo" – Re-Recording Mixer – Christopher Barnett, CAS; Re-Recording Mixer – Roy Waldspurger; Foley Mixer – Jason Butler; We Will Rise: Michelle Obama’s Mission to Educate Girls Around the World – Re-Recording Mixer – Rich Cutler
