= Fumiko Ishioka =

Japanese translator (born 1970)

- 石岡史子 (Japanese); Ishioka Fumiko (Hepburn)
- Born: 1970 (age 55–56); Japan
- Occupation: Educator
- Years active: 1999-present
- Known for: Hana's Suitcase

Fumiko Ishioka (Japanese: 石岡史子; Hepburn: Ishioka Fumiko, born 1970) is a Japanese educator, translator., and Director of Tokyo Holocaust Education Resource Center(Kokoro).

== Biography ==
After finishing a BA at Temple University Japan and an MA in Development Studies at Leeds University in England in 1995, Ishioka joined an NGO set up by public initiative for human rights & peace education.

In 1998 she set up Tokyo Holocaust Education Resource Center with a group of friends. Visiting Auschwitz in 1999, Ishioka requested a loan of artifacts that would convey the story of children. The museum loaned her a child's suitcase, which had a name, a birthdate and the German word, Waisenkind (orphan) written on it. Ishioka began researching the life of the owner of the suitcase, Hana Brady, and eventually found her surviving brother in Canada. The story of Brady and how her suitcase led Ishioka to Toronto became the subject of a CBC documentary.

Karen M. Levine, the producer of the documentary, turned the story into a book; it received the Bank Street College of Education Flora Stieglitz Straus Award for non-fiction and the National Jewish Book Award. The book received a nomination for the Governor General's Award and was selected as a final award candidate for the Norma Fleck award. It has been translated into over 20 languages and published around the world.

George Brady, his daughter Lara Hana Brady, and Fumiko travelled to schools in Canada, Scotland, Mexico, Australia, Germany, China, and other countries to share the story of Hana's Suitcase. Fumiko still visits schools all over Japan to give presentations as part of the work of Kokoro.

Since 2015, Fumiko leads a group of university students on study tours to Poland, Czech Republic, Germany, the Netherlands to visit Auschwitz and other historical places twice a year. She has also organized educators' trips since 2018.

Fumiko lectures at Waseda University since April 2022.
