= Yvette Lu =

Canadian independent film and stage actress, filmmaker, singer, composer

- Born: Vancouver, British Columbia, Canada
- Occupations: Actress, film composer, singer, producer, writer
- Website: http://www.yvettelu.com

Yvette Lu is a Canadian independent film and stage actress, filmmaker, singer, composer, writer and producer, as well as a licensed family physician. Based in Vancouver, British Columbia, Canada, Lu has starred in many independent films, most notably Food for the Gods and Servants of War. She is best known for her starring role as "Sheenyana" in the 2007 short film Food for the Gods. She co-composed the film's musical score and is the lead singer on its soundtrack. Lu has starred or held major roles in various stage productions, including The Tempest, A Midsummer Night's Dream, and Joseph and the Amazing Technicolor Dreamcoat. In addition to her University of British Columbia medical degree, Lu has training in acting and music from UBC, Circle in the Square Theatre School in New York, Vancouver's Schoolcreative, and the Royal Conservatory of Music.

== Early life ==
Lu was born in Vancouver, British Columbia, after her parents immigrated to Canada from Hong Kong. She is fluent in English and Cantonese. Lu received her M.D. degree in 2005 from the University of British Columbia Faculty of Medicine.

== Film career ==
In Servants of War, a Cantonese/Japanese language film with English subtitles, Lu stars as Jei, a young woman oppressed by the World War II Japanese occupation of China. Servants of War and Food for the Gods were both Official Selections of the 12th Annual Vancouver Asian Film Festival, November 6–9, 2008. Food for the Gods previously aired on Shaw Multicultural Channel as part of the cable network's salute to Canada's Asian Heritage Month in May 2008. It also screened at the Vancouver International Film Centre, the New Asia Film Festival, and the Route 66 Film Festival.

On Thursday, September 18, 2008, Lu appeared with her Food for the Gods co-star Danny Dorosh on the front cover of "A&E," a weekly arts and entertainment section of The State Journal-Register of Springfield, Illinois. The photo is a production still of their FFTG characters, Sheenyana and Lt. Richard O'Conner, locked in passionate embrace. On June 5, 2010, Lu was featured in a Canadian edition of the Hong Kong-based Chinese language Ming Pao newspaper, in a four-page feature article (title translated from Chinese), "Doctor Who Acts vs. Actor Who Doctors."

In 2009, Lu starred in a series of government produced children's videos encouraging children and parents to use proper hygiene and immunize against disease. The series is titled DSI: Disease Scene Investigation and currently appears on British Columbia's official Immunize BC website.

As an independent filmmaker, Lu has since co-written and co-directed two short comedies, Baby Donut and Murder at the Orient Street Express. In both films, she also co-starred with fellow FFTG alum, Yuki Morita. Both films premiered at MAMM Fest 2008 and 2009, respectively. In 2010, Lu reprised her most known starring role as "Sheenyana" in two short sequels to Food for the Gods, titled Megami: Legacy for the Gods and Megami: Search for the Gods, serving as "teasers" to a possible TV pilot and/or series based on the property in the future. Lu also served as a producer on the projects. Both sci-fi films will be released in 2011.

== Selected filmography ==
- Untold Stories of the ER Season 6 "Pipe in Head"
- Untold Stories of the ER Season 5 "Grandma's Back"
- Untold Stories of the ER Season 5 "Ice Cold Mom"
- Megami: Search for the Gods
- Megami: Legacy for the Gods
- Taming of the Shrew Man
- The Light at the End of the Road (composer)
- The Gitchie Manito
- Murder at the Orient Street Express
- DSI: Disease Scene Investigation (children's Web series)
- Baby Donut
- Time Well Wasted
- Disconnected
- P.A. The Movie
- Food for the Gods
- Warrior II
- Farewell Ambrosia
- Dread Locked
- Servants of War
- The Spirit of Language
- A Table for One
- Blood
- The Lingerer
- Nobody's Sweetheart

== Discography ==
Food for the Gods: The Original Motion Picture Soundtrack

== See also ==
- Food for the Gods
- DSI: Disease Scene Investigation
