= Visual research =

Visual research is a qualitative research methodology that relies on artistic mediums to produce and represent knowledge. These artistic mediums include film, photography, drawings, paintings, and sculptures. The artistic mediums provide a rich source of information that has the ability to capture reality. They also reveal information about what the medium captures, but the artist or the creator behind the medium. Using photography as an example, the photographs taken illustrate reality and give information about the photographer through the angle, the focus of the image, and the moment in which the picture was taken. Nevertheless, some argue that visual research is not comparable to traditional methodology.

== Research process, a definition and visual images ==
Images are an essential component for different sorts of inquiries on a wide range of topics and research questions may call for a visual component in a variety of ways. One way could be to the research questions or the phenomena being examined, or the researcher could be the one making new images. After the visual material is created the resulting collection may be the base of further discussion, interviews, and or analysis, although the process of creating images is often a large part of the research process itself.

== Participant generated visual methodologies ==
This method of data collection is often used to elicit data or opinion, here the participant is the one who would be generating the visual data. If it is a photograph she or he has taken it, or for a video, she or he has shot the visual data that will be further analysed. This allows the researcher to understand participants' views and perceptions.

=== Photovoice ===
Caroline C. Wang and Mary Anne Burris conceptualized the visual methodology called photovoice. Participants are provided with a camera and asked to produce an image-based account of their experiences and/or those things that are important to them in a particular context. These projects share the assumption that increased participant control of data generation through production of visual images will help to highlight important aspects of lived experience that might otherwise have been overlooked or ignored by researchers. This method is often used in social science and health research.

=== Fotohistorias ===
Ricardo Gomez and Sara Vannini introduced a variation of photovoice called Fotohistorias, that combines participant-generated photos and semistructured interviews to elicit lived experiences of immigrants and other marginalized communities. Fotohistorias combines the power of images and the richness of stories. Together, they yield more depth and sensitivity than either photos or interviews alone. Fotohistorias helps to quickly get to deep conversation about profound and meaningful topics, by focusing on the photos as a pretext for conversation. Fotohistorias helps elicit multiple perspectives and symbols from the same image or place, emphasizing how people's perceptions and feelings shape meaning and experience. Fotohistorias participants frequently feel empowered, heard and valued, and gain a new perspective and agency over their current situation and context.

=== Photo-elicitation ===
The photo-elicitation approach can include researcher or participant generated photographs. Photographs are introduced to the context of research interview based on the "assumption about the role and utility of photographs in promoting reflections that words alone cannot." Participant generated photo elicitation puts significance to the participants role in shaping the creation of visual images. The value of the technique for "bridging culturally distinct worlds of the researcher and the researched." The term photo-elicitation originated from a paper published by Collier (1957), when it was initiated as a solution to the practical difficulties that research teams were having in relation to agreeing on categories for quality housing. Collier extended the method to examine how families adapted to residence among ethnically different people, and to new forms of work in urban factories, interviewing families and communities with photographs created by researchers. Reflecting on the use of photo-elicitation, Collier (1957, p. 858), argued that ‘pictures elicited longer and more comprehensive interviews but at the same time helped subjects overcome the fatigue and repetition of conventional interviews’ and noted the technique's ‘compelling effect upon the informant, its ability to prod latent memory, to stimulate and release emotional statements about the informant’s life’. Photo-elicitation with researcher-initiated productions has been taken up by a range of researchers across the social sciences and related disciplines (Mannay 2016).

=== Film-elicitation ===
This technique of data collection is mostly used by researchers who believe in Positivist or realist view of the world. Making a film as opposed to simply shooting footages, involves editing and other post production tasks, such as adding subtitles, but it also rests upon a series of ideas concerning the place of visual representation within social science itself. This technique of data collection or data analysis is not widely used because of its multiple requirements. Making films – to elicit data or opinion, can be of 3 basic types: 1.Documenting or filming the subjects 2.Showing a film to the subjects and asking about their opinion 3.Asking the subjects to make a film

There are 3 basic concerns when it comes to analysis of a film or a video: 1. the analytical approach taken towards film or video. 2. method employed to derive data. 3. the kind of issue being analysed.

=== Benefits and limitations ===
This methodology is beneficial in its applicability to participants who may be illiterate or have difficulty communicating because of language barriers, lack of education, or a disability. This characteristic of Photovoice allows researchers who choose to use this methodology to choose participants from a large sample pool because there are no language or literacy requirements. Photovoice may be a powerful research tool because it allows the researcher to see the topic being studied from the participant's perspective. It also encourages the participants and the researcher to reflect on the images and meaning behind them as they highlight an aspect or perspective of the research topic perhaps not previously considered. In this way visual methods of data production can act as tools of defamiliarisation, fighting familiarity for both researchers and participants and allowing space for a more nuanced understanding of the topics studies (Mannay 2010).

The use of Photovoice also has its limits. It requires the researcher to budget for the equipment used to carry it out, such as cameras, ink and printing costs. This may be problematic for the researcher if the research has been given limited or insufficient funds.

Another problem that may arise in the use of Photovoice is the question of photograph ownership. The researcher may be providing the equipment, but it is the participants who are taking the pictures. To avoid any potential issues regarding photograph ownership, it is advised that researchers obtain from their participants permission to use the photographs they take. It is particularly important to think carefully about informed consent in an era of digital dissemination and open access publication where images can be reworked, redistributed and recirculated in the digital economy, in ways that may not have been envisaged at the time of the research study (Mannay, 2014).

== Ethical warnings ==
=== Deception or manipulation ===
These are activities where the experimenters are either not disclosing their real identity, or their true purpose for the activity. This includes assuming a false identity such as creating an avatar in an online game, or pretending to be a tourist while looking at statutes. This could also includes manipulating settings in order to observe reactions.

=== Observing and objectifying people by looking covertly from a distance ===
These activities concern individuals who feel that a particular population is being treated in a dispassionate manner or similar to scientists observing natural phenomena in a clinical way. Examples of this would be the exercises which you ask to observe the waiting behaviors of people in public places (either in person from a distance or via webcam).

=== Intimate or detailed observations of personal places or behavior ===
This category refers to a in-depth analysis of intimate, meaningful or personal places activities or spaces, and may include making judgments which could sadden or offend people. An example of this could be coding or commenting on gravestone trends or personal graffiti.

=== Possibility of causing discomfort or concern ===
This is a category, in which the exercise or project may upset some people, or create anxiety or fear (including and potentially, in the researcher). This may happen due to situations which could include wasting people's time or not conforming to societal norms, such as in 'breaching' experiments. The visual offers a range of exciting possibilities for social research but it also brings an array of challenges and ethical difficulties. Visual Ethics can now be regarded as a specialist area within visual methodologies. Much mainstream engagement with the ethics of visual ethnography focuses on issues of anonymity of place and participants so that the focus is on who is taking the picture, who is in the picture; and what else can be known from the geography or materiality of the image. Thus, the moral maze of image ethics has been centrally concerned with the creator of images in relation to informed consent and the tension between revealing and concealing the contents of visual images; and who has ‘the right’ to claim ownership of images to in turn edit their content and show them to others (Mannay 2016).Once a visual image is created it becomes very difficult to control its use or remove it from the public arena if participants decide that they no longer want to be represented in a fixed visual trope for time immemorial. Even if images are successfully anodised, acts to disguise images can be seen as tantamount to silencing the voice of research participants. This is particularly problematic where researchers invest in the epistemological aims of participatory approaches predicated on giving ‘voice’.

== Works cited ==
- Banks, M. (2001). Visual methods in social research. London: Sage. ISBN 978-0761963646.
- Emmison, M.; Smith, P. and Mayall, M. (2012). Researching the visual. London: Sage. ISBN 978-1-4462-0787-1.
- Harper, D. (1994). "On the authority of the image: Visual methods at the crossroads". In Denzin, N.; Lincoln, Y. S. (eds.). Handbook of Qualitative Research. London: Sage. ISBN 978-0803946798.
- Prosser, J. (1998). Image-based Research: A Source Book for Qualitative Researchers. London: Falmer. ISBN 978-0750706490.
- Rose, G. (2001). Visual methodologies. London: Sage. ISBN 978-0761966654.
