= Larry Weinstein =

Canadian film director

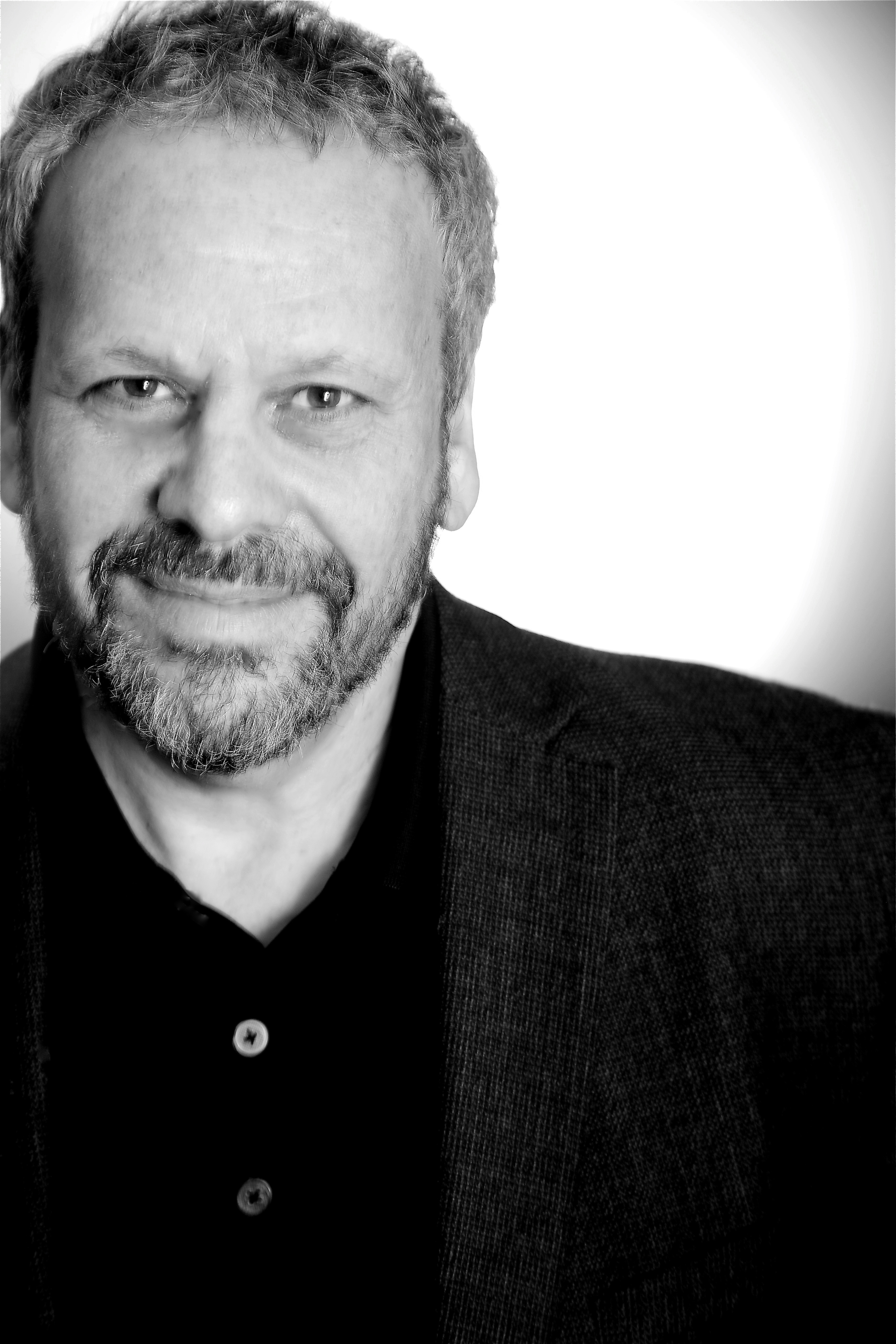
- Born: 1956 (age 69–70); Toronto, Ontario, Canada
- Education: York University
- Occupation: Film director
- Years active: 1982–present
- Children: 2
- Awards: Canadian Screen Award for Best Direction in a Documentary Program (2015, 2019); Gemini Award for Best Direction in a Performing Arts Program or Series
- Website: www.larryweinsteinproductions.com

Larry Weinstein (born 1956) is a Canadian film director of theatrical and television documentaries, performance films, and dramas. The majority of his films centre on musical subjects and the depiction of the creative process, while his other subjects range from the horrors of war to the pleasures of football.

== Biography ==
Weinstein began to make films as a teenager while attending Earl Haig Secondary School. He went on to attend York University's film school. This led to teaming up with Barbara Willis Sweete and Niv Fichman to co-found Rhombus Media in 1979.

Weinstein's directorial debut came in 1984's Making Overtures: The Story of a Community Orchestra, which was nominated for an Academy Award for Best Documentary Short and won the first-ever Best Documentary Gemini Award in Canada. Best known for classical-music projects such as Ravel's Brain, Beethoven's Hair and Mozartballs, Weinstein made 36 films that have garnered dozens of awards from around the world, including three International Emmy Awards (and several other Emmy nominations) and 12 personal Canadian Screen/Gemini Awards, as well as major awards in Canada, the United States, France, The Czech Republic, Mexico, and Australia.

His films have been broadcast in over 40 countries and he has been the subject of many International film retrospectives including those at the Hot Docs Canadian International Documentary Festival, The Jakarta International Film Festival in Indonesia, Doc Aviv in Israel, MOFFOM (Music on Film-Film on Music) in the Czech Republic, The Look of Sound in Germany, Impara L’Arte in Italy, the Havana Film Festival in Cuba, and a recent tribute at TIFF Bell Lightbox in Toronto. York University awarded him an honorary doctorate.

In 2015, Weinstein founded Larry Weinstein Productions and his distribution company, Dead Cow International. Weinstein's 2016 documentary The Devil's Horn premiered at the Hot Docs Ted Rogers Cinema. His other 2016 film, Leslie Caron: The Reluctant Star, a documentary on Leslie Caron, premiered at the TIFF Bell Lightbox.

His film Propaganda: The Art of Selling Lies premiered at the Hot Docs Canadian International Documentary Festival in 2019.

Weinstein won the Canadian Screen Award for Best Direction in a Documentary Program at the 7th Canadian Screen Awards for Dreaming of a Jewish Christmas.

His daughter, Ali Weinstein, is also a filmmaker, most noted for her 2024 film Your Tomorrow.

Weinstein's sister, Judih, was one of the victims in the October 7 attacks in Israel.

== Filmography ==
- Making Overtures: The Story of a Community Orchestra (1984)
- All That Bach (1985)
- Eternal Earth (1987)
- Ravel (1987)
- For The Whales (1989)
- The Radical Romantic: John Weinzweig (1990)
- Nights in The Gardens of Spain (1990)
- When The Fire Burns: The Life and Music of Manuel de Falla (1991)
- My War Years: Arnold Schoenberg (1992)
- Concierto de Aranjuez (1993)
- Shadows and Light: Joaquin Rodrigo at 90 (1993)
- September Songs: The Music of Kurt Weill (1994)
- Solidarity Song: The Hanns Eisler Story (1995)
- The War Symphonies: Shostakovich Against Stalin (1997)
- Hong Kong Symphony: Heaven-Earth-Mankind (1997)
- Ravel's Brain (2001)
- Andrea Bocelli: Tuscan Skies (2001)
- Toothpaste (2002)
- Stormy Weather: The Music of Harold Arlen (2002)
- Beethoven's Hair (2005)
- Burnt Toast (2005)
- Mozartballs (2006)
- Toscanini: In His Own Words (2009)
- Inside Hana's Suitcase (2009)
- Mulroney: The Opera (2011)
- God's Wrath (2011)
- The 13th Man (2012)
- Our Man in Tehran (2013)
- Clara's Big Ride (2015)
- The Devil's Horn (2016)
- Leslie Caron: The Reluctant Star (2016)
- Dreaming of a Jewish Christmas (2017)
- The Impossible Swim (2019)
- Propaganda: The Art of Selling Lies (2019)
- Beethoven's Nine: Ode to Humanity (2024)
