= Eat That Question: Frank Zappa in His Own Words =

- Theatrical release poster
- Directed by: Thorsten Schütte
- Produced by: Estelle Fialon
- Edited by: Willibald Wonneberger
- Distributed by: Sony Pictures Classics
- Release dates: 25 January 2016 (Sundance Film Festival); 24 June 2016 (limited)
- Running time: 93 minutes
- Language: English
- Box office: $354,981

Eat That Question: Frank Zappa in His Own Words is a 2016 documentary film about Frank Zappa. It incorporates clips from various interviews, concerts, movies, and previously unseen footage pertaining to Frank Zappa.

== Reception ==
=== Critical reception ===
Eat That Question has received mostly positive reviews from critics. Review aggregator Rotten Tomatoes gives the film an approval rating of 91%, based on 69 reviews, with an average rating of 7.3/10. The website's critical consensus reads, "Eat That Question: Frank Zappa in His Own Words offers an illuminating primer for Zappa novices as well as an entertaining retrospective for diehard fans." On Metacritic, the film has a score of 74 out of 100, based on 22 critics, indicating "generally favorable" reviews.
