= David Iacono =

American actor (born 2002)

- Born: June 20, 2002 (age 24); Brooklyn, New York, U.S.
- Occupation: Actor
- Years active: 2011−present

David Iacono (born June 20, 2002) is an American actor. On television, he appeared in the Amazon Prime series The Summer I Turned Pretty (2022–2023) and the Netflix series Dead Boy Detectives (2024). He has starred in the films Cinnamon (2023) and Jurassic World Rebirth (2025).

== Early life and education ==
Iacono is from Brooklyn, New York. He is of Mexican, Italian and Puerto Rican descent. He attended Fiorello H. LaGuardia High School, alongside fellow The Summer I Turned Pretty star Lola Tung. In 2020, Iacono mentioned wanting to study Filmmaking at the School of Visual Arts.

== Career ==
Iacono was a child model for print magazines and commercials. At six years old, he made his feature film debut in the crime horror Choose, which premiered in 2011. He went on to appear in the 2014 comedy-drama film St. Vincent. He made his television debut in 2015 with appearances in the NBC drama The Slap and the HBO miniseries Show Me a Hero.

After a number of small guest roles, Iacono had his first major television roles in 2020 when he guest starred in an installment of the Netflix anthology Social Distance, had a recurring role as Bo Orlov in the teen drama Grand Army, also on Netflix, and began playing Eli Briscoe in the HBO Max series The Flight Attendant. He appeared in the second and third seasons of the Showtime crime drama City on a Hill as Faust Aquino.

In 2022, Iacono played Cam Cameron in the Amazon Prime coming-of-age romance series The Summer I Turned Pretty. He reprised his role in the second season the following year. He starred as Eddie in the thriller film Cinnamon with Hailey Kilgore, which premiered at the Tribeca Festival.

Iacono played the role of Xavier, a comedic relief character, in the seventh film of the Jurassic Park franchise, Jurassic World Rebirth.

In July 2026, Iacono was cast as Wes Bennett in the Netflix adaptation of Better than the Movies, based on the novel by Lynn Painter.

== Filmography ==
=== Film ===
†	Denotes productions that have not yet been released

Year	Title	Role	Notes
2011	Choose	Jake	
2014	St. Vincent	Jeremiah	
2016	The Pastor	Miguel	
2019	Joker	Flirting Man	
2023	Cinnamon	Eddie	
2023	Fresh Kills	Bobby Jr.	
2024	Hungry	Cyrus	
2025	Fear Street: Prom Queen	Tyler Torres	
2025	Jurassic World Rebirth	Xavier Dobbs	
TBA	Goodbye Girl	Colin Davis	
2027	Better than the Movies †	Wes Bennett	Post-production

=== Television ===
Year	Title	Role	Notes
2015	The Slap	Bryce	Episode: "Harry"
2015	The Daily Show	Teen Singer	Episode: "George Stephanopoulos"
2015	Show Me a Hero	Older Roberto	3 episodes
2016−2018	What Would You Do?	Various	4 episodes
2017	The Blacklist: Redemption	Street Kid	Episode: "Hostages"
2017	NCIS: New Orleans	Joey Shelton	Episode: "Hard Knock Life"
2018	Strangers	Bully	Episode: "Maskulinity"
2018	New Amsterdam	Jalen Pagan	Episode: "Cavitation"
2019	Alternatino with Arturo Castro	Teen	Episode: "La Pulga"
2020	The Good Doctor	Ryan	Episode: "Mutations"
2020	Social Distance	Jake Miller	Episode: "everything is v depressing rn"
2020	Grand Army	Bo Orlov	6 episodes
2020	Blue Bloods	Andy Diaz	Episode: "Atonement"
2020–2022	The Flight Attendant	Eli Briscoe	8 episodes
2021–2022	City on a Hill	Faust Aquino	3 episodes
2021, 2024	Hightown	Ralphie	3 episodes
2022–2023	The Summer I Turned Pretty	Cam Cameron	8 episodes
2024	Dead Boy Detectives	David the Demon	6 episodes
TBA	Hot Pink †	TBA	TV movie
TBA	The Chlorine Bible †	Joseph	Post-production
