= Amélie Hoeferle =

German-American actress (born 2002)

Amélie Elisabeth Hoeferle
- Born: June 5, 2002 (age 24); Munich, Bavaria, Germany
- Occupation: Actress
- Years active: 2019–present
- Notable work: The Hunger Games: The Ballad of Songbirds & Snakes (2023); Sterling Point (2026)

Amélie Hoeferle (born June 5, 2002) is a German-American actress. She is best known for her roles in The Hunger Games: The Ballad of Songbirds & Snakes (2023) as Vipsania Sickle, in Night Swim (2024) as Izzy Waller and in Sterling Point (2026) as Ramona Campbell.

== Early life ==
Hoeferle was born to Christian and Brigitta Hoeferle (née Lauster) on June 5, 2002. She was born in Germany. Her mother is a communication strategist and executive trainer from Baden-Wurttemberg, Germany who is CEO of The Center of NLP. Her father, originally from Weilheim in Oberbayern, works as a cross-cultural communication and leadership consultant and is the founder of The Culture Mastery.

Hoeferle lived in Cleveland, Tennessee, before moving with her family to Atlanta, Georgia, as a teenager. By 2019, she had founded a smoothie service. She went to the New School. She has a sister, Ana, with whom she is close.

== Career ==
Hoeferle became interested in acting at age 14 after filmmaker Erica Scoggins approached her at a coffee shop in Cleveland, Tennessee. Scoggins cast Hoeferle in a short film. Hoeferle traveled with the film to several festivals, including one in France, and has credited the experience with introducing her to filmmaking and encouraging her to pursue acting professionally.

In 2026, Hoeferle starred as Ramona in the Prime Video coming-of-age series Sterling Point, created by Megan Park. Hoeferle said she was drawn to the role because of the character's complicated relationship with her newly discovered sister, Annie, played by Ella Rubin, as well as the series’ portrayal of depression and sisterhood. She described her own relationship with her sister as informing aspects of her performance and said that she and Rubin developed a natural rapport during the audition process.

== Filmography ==
=== Film ===
Key
†	Denotes films that have not yet been released

Year	Title	Role	Notes
2019	The Boogeywoman	Sam	Short film
2020	In the Shadow	Claire	Short film
2021	Scary Story	Cate	Short film
2023	Sharpie	Cate	Short film
2023	The Hunger Games: The Ballad of Songbirds & Snakes	Vipsania Sickle	
2024	Night Swim	Izzy Waller	
2025	Eddington	Sarah	
2026	One Mile: Chapter One	Alex Beckett	
2026	One Mile: Chapter Two	Alex Beckett	
2027	Fake Skating †	Dani Collins	Post-production

=== Television ===
Year	Title	Role	Notes
2026–present	Sterling Point	Ramona Lee Campbell	Main role
