= Steve Alexander =

Steve Alexander may refer to:

- Steve Alexander (businessman) (born 1951), professional coach and communications expert
- Steve Alexander (drummer) (born 1962), Welsh drummer

== See also ==
- Stephen Alexander (disambiguation)
