= Voltron (film) =

Upcoming film by Rawson Marshall Thurber

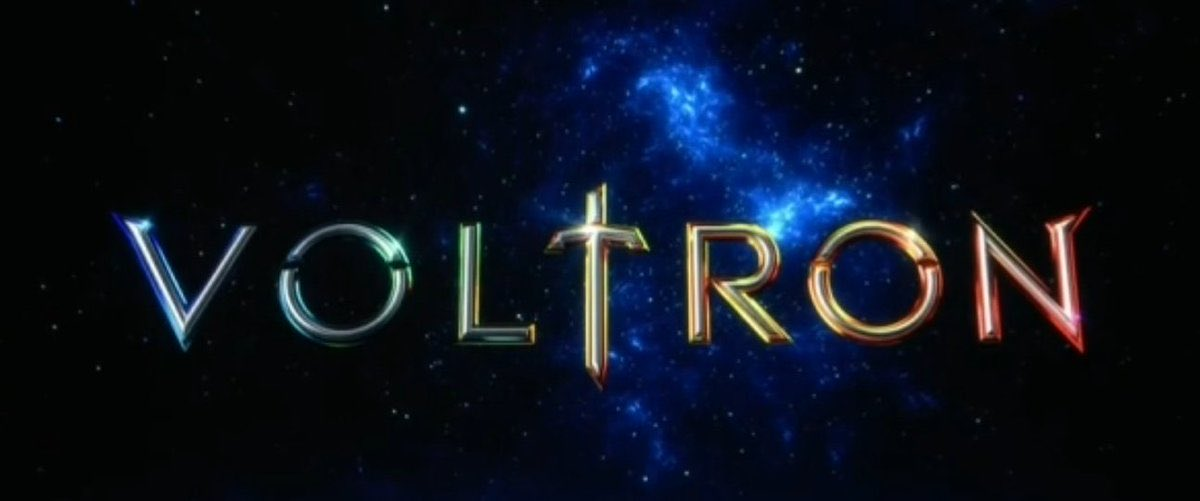
- Official logo
- Directed by: Rawson Marshall Thurber
- Screenplay by: Ellen Shanman; Rawson Marshall Thurber
- Story by: Rawson Marshall Thurber
- Based on: Voltron by World Events Productions (Note: World Events Productions' Voltron (1984-1985) is an English dubbed re-edit of Toei Animation's anime series Beast King GoLion (1981-1982) and Armored Fleet Dairugger XV (1982-1983); Lion Force Voltron—Voltron's first series consisting of the first two seasons—adapts Beast King GoLion, while Vehicle Team Voltron—Voltron's second series and third/final season—adapts Armored Fleet Dairugger XV.)
- Produced by: Todd Lieberman; Rawson Marshall Thurber; Bob Koplar; David Hoberman
- Starring: Daniel Quinn-Toye; Rita Ora; John Harlan Kim; Alba Baptista; Samson Kayo; Sterling K. Brown; Henry Cavill
- Cinematography: Markus Förderer
- Edited by: Julian Clarke; Mike Sale
- Music by: Steve Jablonsky
- Production companies: World Events Productions; Hidden Pictures; Hobie Films; Viva Films; Blvck Films
- Distributed by: Amazon Prime Video
- Release date: 2027
- Country: United States
- Language: English

Voltron is an upcoming American science fiction action film serving as a live-action adaptation of the 1980s animated television series of the same name. It is directed and co-written by Rawson Marshall Thurber, who produced with Todd Lieberman, David Hoberman, and Bob Koplar for Amazon Prime Video. It stars newcomer Daniel Quinn-Toye in his feature film debut, alongside Rita Ora, John Harlan Kim, Alba Baptista, Samson Kayo, Sterling K. Brown, and Henry Cavill.

Voltron is scheduled to be released globally on Amazon Prime Video in spring 2027.

== Premise ==
Five piloted Robot Lions can combine to form the ultimate humanoid robot, Voltron to battle evil. According to director Rawson Marshall Thurber, the film will "stay true to the heart and the spirit of Voltron" while "introducing an entirely new generation of pilots", reimagining the franchise in live-action.

== Cast ==
- Daniel Quinn-Toye as Keith Kogane
- Henry Cavill as King Alfor
- Sterling K. Brown as Zarkon
- Rita Ora as Witch Haggar
- John Harlan Kim
- Alba Baptista
- Samson Kayo
- Tharanya Tharan
- Laura Gordon
- Tim Griffin
- Nathan Jones as Super Soldier
- Roberto Zenca as Galran Emperor

== Production ==
=== Development ===
In July 2005, producer Mark Gordon, together with Ted Koplar, announced plans to create a live-action film adaptation of the Voltron franchise in collaboration with producers Mark Costa and Ford Oelman. Pharrell Williams was also reportedly attached to compose the musical score for the film. The project's development was funded by Jim Young's Animus Films.

In August 2007, New Regency entered negotiations with World Events and The Mark Gordon Company to adapt Voltron, with Justin Marks writing a new script. Interest in the property heightened after the box office success of Transformers (2007), another film involving shape-changing robots. Marks' script was described as "a post-apocalyptic tale set in New York City...[in which] five ragtag survivors of an alien attack band together and end up piloting the five lion-shaped robots that combine and form the massive sword-wielding Voltron that helps battle Earth's invaders." But at that time, Ted Koplar, through World Events, was fighting a legal battle with Toei Company Ltd. over the movie rights.

On August 17, 2008, Relativity Media entered negotiations with New Regency to finance and produce the film, at the time titled Voltron: Defender of the Universe, though on a more moderate budget. In 2009, World Events partnered with Atlas Entertainment to develop and secure financing for the film, with Chuck Roven, Richard Suckle, Steve Alexander, and Jason Netter to produce. Thomas Dean Donnelly and Joshua Oppenheimer entered into collaboration on writing the script, and on September 16, 2010, concept art for the movie was released.

In 2011, Relativity Media entered into an option agreement with Atlas and World Events to finance and produce the film, but the option later expired, and in 2015, Relativity filed for bankruptcy. World Events subsequently granted an option to produce the feature film to DreamWorks Animation, with whom it had partnered with for the animated series Voltron: Legendary Defender. In November 2016, it was announced that Universal Pictures and DreamWorks Animation would make the film with David Hayter writing the script.

In March 2022, it was announced that a live-action adaptation was officially back in development, based on a story by Rawson Marshall Thurber. Thurber planned to direct and co-write the screenplay with Ellen Shanman, and Thurber, Todd Lieberman, David Hoberman, and Bob Koplar would produce. In April 2022, Amazon MGM Studios announced that it was in negotiations for the distribution rights of the film. Kurt Swanson and Bart Mueller served as the costume designers. Hasbro signed a deal with Amazon to produce merchandise for the film in February 2026.

=== Casting ===
In October 2024, newcomer Daniel Quinn-Toye was cast in the lead role, alongside Henry Cavill. In November 2024, Sterling K. Brown, Rita Ora, John Harlan Kim, Alba Baptista, Samson Kayo, Tharanya Tharan, Laura Gordon, and Tim Griffin joined the cast, while Nathan Jones, Keanu Karim, and Kevin Spink were cast the next month and January 2025 respectively. In February and April 2025, Roberto Zenca, Becki Cross Trujillo, and Matthew Scully also joined the cast.

=== Filming ===
Principal photography began in December 2024, in Gold Coast, Queensland, Australia, at Village Roadshow Studios, under the working title Space Mouse. Filming wrapped on May 24, 2025.

=== Post-production ===
Julian Clarke and Mike Sale will serve as editors on the film. In January 2026, it was revealed that Cavill and K. Brown would portray King Alfor and Zarkon, respectively. On May 11, 2026, Daniel Quinn-Toye as Keith Kogane, Rita Ora as Witch Haggar, Nathan Jones as Super Soldier and Roberto Zenca as Galran Emperor. On August 15, 2026, Henry Cavill was announced to have joined the mecha war.

== Release ==
In May 2026, it was announced that Voltron would forgo theaters and be released direct to streaming exclusively on Amazon Prime Video. The film is scheduled to be released globally on Prime Video in spring 2027.
