= Keen Ruffalo =

American actor (born 2001)

- Born: June 19, 2001 (age 25)
- Occupation: Actor
- Years active: 2025–present
- Parents: Mark Ruffalo (father); Sunrise Coigney (mother)

Keen Ruffalo (born June 19, 2001) is an American actor. He is best known for his role as Connor Jacobson in the Amazon Prime Video series Sterling Point.

== Career ==
As a 12 year-old Ruffalo was an extra on his father’s film Begin Again (2013) and made a brief cameo in 2017 film Thor: Ragnarok, but at that age had no interest in pursuing an acting career. After later deciding to act, he appeared in roles on stage. On screen, he could be seen in 2025 film Nimrods, and in television series Hal & Harper and Task that year.

Ruffalo appears in 2026 coming-of-age television series Sterling Point as slacker twin brother, Connor, of Ella Rubin's Annie. In November 2026, he joined the cast of Ari Aster film Scapegoat.

== Personal life ==
He is the son of actors Mark Ruffalo and Sunrise Coigney and grew up in Callicoon, New York before later living in Los Angeles. He has two younger sisters. He spent a semester at Drexel University studying fashion design prior to the COVID-19 pandemic after which he moved into acting.

== Filmography ==
| Year | Title | Role | Notes |
|---|---|---|---|
| 2025 | Hal & Harper | Hal's roommate | 3 episodes |
| 2025 | Task | Tripp | Episode: "Crossings" |
| 2025 | Nimrods | Wayne | Film |
| 2026–present | Sterling Point | Connor Jacobson | Main role |
