= Nimrods =

2025 American film

- Theatrical release poster
- Directed by: Lee Kirk
- Screenplay by: Lee Kirk
- Story by: Green Day; Lee Kirk
- Produced by: Tim Perell; Green Day; Ryan Kroft; Anna Keegan
- Starring: Mason Thames; Kylr Coffman; Ryan Foust; Jenna Fischer; Angela Kinsey; Fred Armisen; Bobby Lee; Jolene; Keen Ruffalo; Ignacio Diaz-Silverio; Sean Gunn; Billie Joe Armstrong; Mike Dirnt; Tré Cool; Mckenna Grace
- Cinematography: David Robert Jones
- Edited by: Ryan Brown
- Music by: Alec Puro
- Production companies: Legion M; Live Nation Studios; Process
- Distributed by: Inaugural Entertainment
- Release dates: September 12, 2025 (TIFF); August 14, 2026 (United States)
- Running time: 107 minutes
- Country: United States
- Language: English
- Box office: $1.3 million

Nimrods (previously titled New Year's Rev) is a 2025 American coming-of-age road comedy film written and directed by Lee Kirk. The film stars Mason Thames, Kylr Coffman, Ryan Foust, Jenna Fischer, Angela Kinsey, Fred Armisen, Bobby Lee, Jolene, Keen Ruffalo, Ignacio Diaz-Silverio, Sean Gunn, Billie Joe Armstrong, Mike Dirnt, Tré Cool, and Mckenna Grace. It follows three teenagers who travel from Kansas City to Los Angeles under the belief that their band is opening for Green Day on New Year's Eve.

Nimrods premiered at the Toronto International Film Festival on September 12, 2025, and was released by Inaugural Entertainment in the United States on August 14, 2026. The film received generally positive reviews from critics.

== Plot ==
On December 20, best friends Tommy and Fred ditch the last day of school before winter break. Both are passionate fans of Green Day and dream of becoming successful musicians with their band, the Analog Dogs. Tommy lives with his older brother Wayne and their mother. Their drummer, Chad, is more cautious and reserved than the other two.

After the boys fail to sneak into a Green Day concert in their hometown, they continue looking for a way to see the band perform live. Around Christmas, Tommy receives his father's old jacket and an 4-track recorder from his mother, further encouraging his interest in music.

Wayne's best friend, Keith, later plays a prank on Tommy and Fred by convincing them that the Analog Dogs have been chosen to open for Green Day at a New Year's Eve concert in Los Angeles. Believing the opportunity is real, Tommy and Fred decide to make the trip to Los Angeles. They take Wayne's car without permission, even though Tommy does not have a driver's license. Chad initially refuses to join them after realizing that the supposed opportunity may be a prank.

The journey quickly becomes chaotic. Tommy loses his phone, and the boys mistakenly put diesel fuel into Wayne's car, leaving them stranded. After discovering Chad's emergency credit card, they use it to help pay for their journey. They enter a small local music competition in an attempt to win money, performing with the Analog Dogs (winning the contest, but upon revealing they were high school students, were subsequently disqualified). When they are unable to get Wayne's car working, they eventually are given an ice cream truck and continue toward Los Angeles.

During their trip, Tommy and Fred encounter Olivia and her sister, who stop them while looking for ice cream. They later arrive at a venue called the Hole, where the Analog Dogs perform "Freaking Out". Fred also takes mushrooms that Keith had hidden in Wayne's car, causing him to experience strange hallucinations.

Chad becomes increasingly frustrated with Tommy and Fred's behavior and begins to question his place in the band. Feeling that he does not fit their idea of being "punk rock", he leaves the Analog Dogs. Tommy and Fred continue their journey and eventually stay at the Lincoln Inn, whose suspicious manager initially appears helpful. The manager later reveals himself to be dangerous, forcing Tommy and Fred to escape.

After the two friends have a serious argument, they realize how much they depend on each other. Chad eventually decides to rejoin them. His mother refuses to help them reach Los Angeles, but Chad changes his mind after realizing how important the journey is to his friends. He takes his mother's van and drives to Los Angeles.

The three friends finally reach the Green Day concert and attempt to sneak inside. Chad disguises himself as the band’s mascot while Fred uses VIP passes to gain access. Tommy is caught by security, but the friends manage to get close to the stage. Wayne eventually finds Tommy and admits that the invitation to open for Green Day was a prank. Despite the deception, the boys remain at the concert. During Green Day's performance, Fred is unexpectedly invited onstage to play guitar with the band. The experience inspires the Analog Dogs to take their music more seriously.

After the concert, Tommy, Fred, and Chad learn that Green Day has heard the Analog Dogs' song "Bored" and enjoyed it. Green Day offers the young band an opportunity to perform and record their music, giving the Analog Dogs a chance to pursue their dream of becoming a real punk-rock band.

On their way home, with Wayne driving the minivan, they return to the Hole where Tommy reconnects with Olivia, and he and Wayne's mother join them.

== Cast ==
- Mason Thames as Tommy
- Kylr Coffman as Fred
- Ryan Foust as Chad
- Jenna Fischer as Jodie, Tommy and Wayne's mother
- Mckenna Grace as Olivia
- Angela Kinsey as the host at Buck's, the bar in Oklahoma
- Keen Ruffalo as Wayne, Tommy's older brother
- Ignacio Diaz-Silverio as Keith, Wayne's best friend
- Green Day (Billie Joe Armstrong, Mike Dirnt, Tré Cool) as themselves
- Harper Marie Kirk as Cassidy, Olivia's younger sister
- Fred Armisen as Jim
- Bobby Lee as Otis, the security guard
- Sean Gunn as Colby
- Jolene Blalock as Deborah, Chad's mother

== Production ==
In June 2022, director Lee Kirk appeared on the podcast Office Ladies, hosted by actresses Jenna Fischer, his wife, and Angela Kinsey. During the podcast, Kirk revealed that he was working on another film with Billie Joe Armstrong, the lead singer of punk rock band Green Day. Kirk had previously worked with Armstrong on the comedy-drama film Ordinary World (2016), which featured Armstrong as the lead.

In February 2025, Live Nation Productions, the film and television production branch of Live Nation Entertainment, announced that a comedy film inspired by Green Day was in production, with Mason Thames, Kylr Coffman, and Ryan Foust in lead roles, and Fischer, Kinsey, Ignacio Diaz-Silverio, and Keen Ruffalo in supporting roles. Later that month, Mckenna Grace, Fred Armisen, Bobby Lee, and Sean Gunn were cast in supporting roles in the film.

In April 2026, it was announced that the film, originally known as New Years Rev, was acquired by Inaugural Entertainment and retitled Nimrods.

== Soundtrack ==
Nimrods Original Soundtrack

Soundtrack album by Green Day
- Released: July 31, 2026
- Length: 1:28:00
- Label: Reprise

Green Day chronology
Saviors (2024)	Nimrods Original Soundtrack (2026)

Singles from Nimrods Original Soundtrack
- 1. "I'm Never Gonna R.I.P." Released: July 7, 2026

Nimrods Original Soundtrack was released on July 31, 2026. It features various songs from Green Day's discography; one new Green Day song, "I'm Never Gonna R.I.P."; a handful of Green Day live recordings that have never been officially released before; and songs by Anal OG Dogs—the fictional band comprising the film's main characters—and real-life artists Mckenna Grace, the Paradox, and Ultra Q.

Green Day released "I'm Never Gonna R.I.P." as a single on July 7, 2026.

All songs by Green Day except where noted.

Nimrods Original Soundtrack track liasting
No.	Title	Artist	Length
1.	"Longview"		3:58
2.	"In the End"		1:46
3.	"Bored"	Anal OG Dogs	2:05
4.	"When I Come Around"		2:57
5.	"Walking Contradiction"		2:30
6.	"Dilemma"		3:17
7.	"Waiting"		3:13
8.	"Geek Stink Breath"		2:15
9.	"Bab's Uvula Who?"		2:07
10.	"Panic Song"		3:35
11.	"Basket Case"		3:02
12.	"Hitchin' a Ride"		2:51
13.	"Dominated Love Slave" (Live)	Anal OG Dogs	1:40
14.	"Haushinka"		3:25
15.	"Bobby Sox"		3:44
16.	"Ms. Lauren"	The Paradox	2:27
17.	"It's So Fine"	Mckenna Grace	2:58
18.	"Getaway"	Anal OG Dogs	2:29
19.	"Freaking Out"	Anal OG Dogs	1:08
20.	"Cold"	Ultra Q	2:50
21.	"Last Night on Earth"		3:55
22.	"Brain Stew"		3:12
23.	"Wake Me Up When September Ends"		4:45
24.	"Corvette Summer"		3:01
25.	"American Idiot" (Live)		3:35
26.	"Know Your Enemy" (Live)		5:02
27.	"Auld Lang Syne" (Live)		1:12
28.	"Good Riddance (Time of Your Life)"		2:33
29.	"I'm Never Gonna R.I.P."		2:04
30.	"Going to Pasalacqua" (Live)		4:10

=== Charts ===
Chart performance for Nimrods (Original Soundtrack)
Chart (2026)	Peak position
Hungarian Albums (MAHASZ)	21
Irish Compilation Albums (IRMA)	26
New Zealand Albums (RMNZ)	12
UK Album Downloads (Official Charts)	82
UK Compilation Albums (Official Charts)	29
UK Soundtrack Albums (Official Charts)	2
US Soundtrack Albums (Billboard)	6

== Release ==
Nimrods premiered at the Toronto International Film Festival on September 12, 2025 under its original title New Year's Rev. It was officially released on August 14, 2026.

== Reception ==
On the review aggregator website Rotten Tomatoes, 72% of 58 critics' reviews are positive, with an average rating of 6.2/10. The website's consensus reads: "Driven by an energetic mix of Green Day hits and deep cuts, Nimrods overcomes its familiar road comedy elements with a charmingly scrappy DIY spirit and winning performances." Metacritic, which uses a weighted average, assigned the film a score of 55 out of 100, based on 10 critics, indicating "mixed or average" reviews.

Dan Gentile of SFGate gave the film a positive review, praising the three "spot-on" lead performances and stating that the film "hits all the right notes."
