= Stephen Alexander =

Stephen or Steven Alexander may refer to:

- Stephen Alexander (American football) (born 1975), American football tight end
- Steven Alexander (singer), on The Voice UK
- Stephen Alexander (astronomer) (1806–1883), astronomer and educator

== See also ==
- Steve Alexander (disambiguation)
