= Jacob Whiteduck-Lavoie =

Canadian actor (born 2003)

- Born: 20 June 2003 (age 23); Maniwaki, Quebec, Canada
- Occupation: Actor
- Years active: 2018–present

Jacob Whiteduck-Lavoie (born 20 June 2003) is a Canadian and Indigenous actor. Raised on the Kitigan Zibi Reservation, Whiteduck-Lavoie is of Algonquin, Kitigan Zibi Anishinabeg and French-Canadian heritage.

He is most noted for his performance in the film A Colony (Une colonie), for which he received a Canadian Screen Award nomination for Best Supporting Actor in 2019 and a Prix Iris nomination for Revelation of the Year at the 21st Quebec Cinema Awards. He stars in the Amazon Prime series Sterling Point as Ellis.

== Biography ==
Whiteduck-Lavoie was born June 20, 2003, in Québec, Canada, to a mother of Kitigan Zibi Anishinabeg First Nation heritage and a French-Canadian father. Whiteduck-Lavoie grew up on a First Nation reserve and spoke Algonquin, but has forgotten most of it since he left the reservation at age 10. Whiteduck-Lavoie is fluent in French and English.

== Filmography ==
=== Film ===
Year	Title	Role	Ref.
2018	A Colony	Jimmy	-
2021	Bootlegger	Paul	-
2022	Falcon Lake	Jackson	-
2023	Des hommes, la nuit	Shayne	-
2023	Billie Blue	Émile	-

=== Television ===
Year	Title	Role	Ref.
2018	District 31	Matteo Harnois	-
2019	La Panne	Fernand	-
2019–2023	Troubled Waters	Billy Desbiens	-
2024	La dernière communion	Dave	-
2024	Contre-offre	Dave Laganière	-
2024–2025	Premier trio	Xavier	-
2026–present	Sterling Point	Ellis	-
