= Damon Wayans =

American comedian, actor, producer and writer (born 1960)

Damon Wayans Sr.
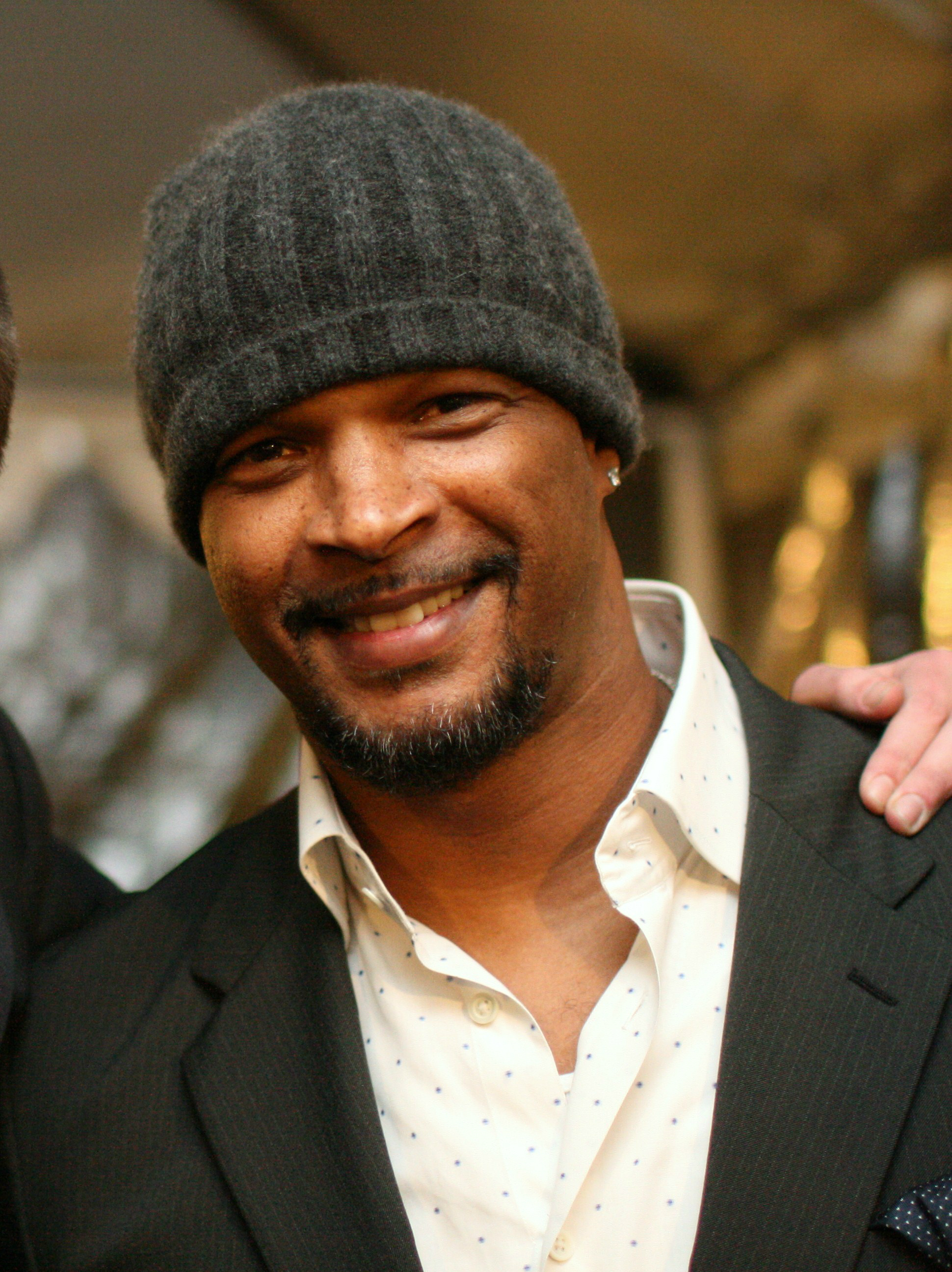
- Wayans in 2008
- Born: Damon Kyle Wayans; September 4, 1960 (age 66); New York City, U.S.
- Spouse: Lisa Thorner (m. 1984; div. 2000)
- Children: 4, including Damon Wayans Jr.
- Relatives: Dwayne Wayans (brother); Keenen Ivory Wayans (brother); Kim Wayans (sister); Shawn Wayans (brother); Marlon Wayans (brother); Damon Wayans Jr. (son)
- Family: Wayans family

Comedy career
- Years active: 1982–present
- Medium: Film; stand-up; television
- Genres: Observational comedy; black comedy; political satire
- Subjects: Family; marriage; American politics; everyday life

Damon Kyle Wayans Sr. (/ˈdeɪmən ˈweɪ.ənz/ DAY-mən WAY-ənz; born September 4, 1960) is an American stand-up comedian, actor, producer, and writer. A member of the Wayans family of entertainers, Damon performed as a comedian and actor throughout the 1980s, including a brief stint on the NBC sketch comedy series Saturday Night Live. He later joined his family on Fox's sketch comedy show In Living Color (1990–1992), and wrote and performed on his own animated series Waynehead (1996–1997) and live-action series Damon (1998). Since then, he has starred in a number of films and television shows, some of which he has co-produced or co-written, including Mo' Money, The Last Boy Scout, Major Payne, Bulletproof, and the sitcoms My Wife and Kids and Poppa's House, the latter featuring his son Damon Wayans Jr. From 2016 to 2019, he starred as Roger Murtaugh in the Fox television series Lethal Weapon.

== Early life ==
Wayans was born in Harlem in New York City, the fourth child of Elvira Alethia (née Green), a homemaker, singer and social worker, and Howell Stouten Wayans, a supermarket manager. His three older siblings are Dwayne, Keenen Ivory, and Diedra. His six younger siblings are Kim, Elvira, Nadia, Vonnie, Shawn, and Marlon. The Wayans children were raised as Jehovah's Witnesses.

He was born with a club foot that was medically treated, but Wayans stated in 2024 how the condition nonetheless results in pervasive pain he described as "like, a toothache in my foot". This physical attribute would also be given to his character in My Wife and Kids, and his character on the short-lived cartoon series Waynehead.

Wayans attended Murry Bergtraum High School.

== Career ==
Wayans started doing stand-up comedy in 1982. His earliest film appearance was a brief cameo as an effeminate hotel employee in the Eddie Murphy film of 1984, Beverly Hills Cop.

He appeared on Saturday Night Live as a featured player in the From 1985 to '86 season. But Wayans was fired after seven episodes for improvising during a live sketch. He decided to play a police officer character as flamboyantly gay, which was not planned in advance. Wayans later claimed he wanted to be fired due to lack of creative freedom and screen time. Wayans further explained how producer Lorne Michaels did not want Wayans to have too much exposure as a newcomer on the show to avoid comparisons to Eddie Murphy who had recently departed Saturday Night Live. Michaels invited Wayans to return as a host several years later.

Wayans also appeared in the syndicated television series Solid Gold during the 1980s as a comedian.

With his brother Keenen, Wayans created the Fox sketch comedy series In Living Color, which had a mostly African-American cast. The show went on the air in April 1990. It continued running until May 1994, although Wayans left the show in 1992 to pursue a film career.

During and after In Living Color, he starred in films such as The Last Boy Scout (1991), Mo' Money (1992), Last Action Hero (1993), Major Payne (1995), Celtic Pride (1996), Bulletproof (1996), and The Great White Hype (1996), and wrote and starred in the film Blankman (1994). He also appeared in Janet Jackson's video "The Best Things in Life Are Free" and was considered for the role of the Riddler in Batman Forever (the role went to Jim Carrey, his co-star from In Living Color and Earth Girls Are Easy).

In October 1996, he produced Waynehead, a short-lived cartoon for The WB, loosely based on his own childhood growing up in a large family, starring a poor boy with a club foot. The show only lasted a season due to poor ratings. From 1997 to 1998, he was the executive producer of 413 Hope St., a short-lived drama on the FOX network starring Richard Roundtree and Jesse L. Martin.

In March 1998, he starred in the short-lived comedy television series Damon, in which he played a detective from Chicago. It aired on Fox. In 1999, his The New York Times bestselling book Bootleg, with co author David Asbery was published; it is a humorous compilation of his observations about family.

In October 2000, he was the lead in Spike Lee's Bamboozled. Wayans starred in the ABC comedy series My Wife and Kids from March 2001 to May 2005. He was also co-creator of the short lived ABC sitcom Rodney, starring Rodney Carrington and Jennifer Aspen, that ran from 2004–2006. In the end of 2006, he produced and starred in the Showtime sketch comedy series The Underground, which also featured his son, Damon Jr. He also hosted the June 2006 BET Awards.

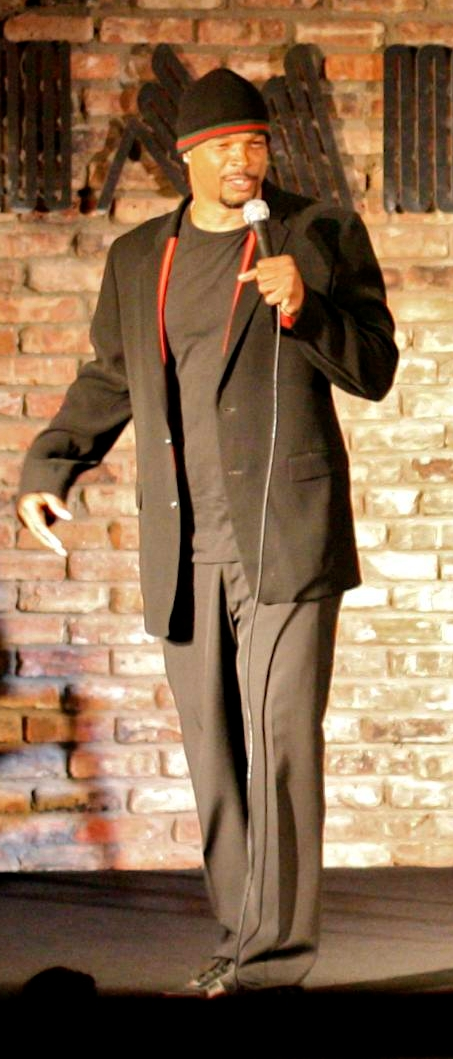
Wayans performing in 2007

In 2011, he also added author of a serious fictional novel to his credits with Red Hats, which is the story of a suicidal 65-year-old woman who finds friendship and happiness, when she joins the Red Hat Society. As of 2014, Wayans continues to perform stand-up comedy and has developed apps with his company of freelancers "MIMS" (Money in My Sleep). The company created applications such as Flick Dat, Diddeo and VHedz.

On November 12, 2015, at the Irvine Improv, Wayans announced his retirement from stand up commencing December 2015. In September 2016, he was cast as Roger Murtaugh in the television version of Lethal Weapon, a role originated by Danny Glover in the film series. On October 3, 2018, it was reported that Wayans would leave Lethal Weapon after filming of the first thirteen episodes of Season 3 wrapped. Lethal Weapon officially ended in February 2019, after three seasons.

Wayans returned to scripted television in the fall of 2024 with his son Damon Jr. on the CBS sitcom Poppa's House. Wayans will guest star in the Martin spinoff The Varnell Hill Show on Paramount+, as well as the season 3 premiere of the NBC mockumentary sitcom St. Denis Medical.

== Personal life ==
Wayans was married to Lisa Thorner; they divorced in 2000. He has four children with Thorner: sons Damon Wayans Jr. and Michael Wayans and daughters Cara Mia Wayans and Kyla Wayans. He is also a grandfather and a great grandfather. He is the uncle of Damien Dante Wayans, Chaunté Wayans and Craig Wayans.

Wayans was diagnosed with type 2 diabetes in early 2013. In December 2015, Wayans successfully underwent brain surgery to remove a benign tumor on his pituitary gland. He retired from stand-up shortly thereafter, and spent three months recovering.

== Filmography ==
=== Film ===
| Year | Title | Role | Notes |
|---|---|---|---|
| 1984 | Beverly Hills Cop | Banana Man | |
| 1987 | Hollywood Shuffle | Body Guard No. 2 / Willie | |
| 1987 | Roxanne | Jerry | |
| 1988 | Colors | T-Bone | |
| 1988 | Earth Girls Are Easy | Zeebo | |
| 1988 | Punchline | Percy | |
| 1988 | I'm Gonna Git You Sucka | Leonard | |
| 1990 | Look Who's Talking Too | Eddie | Voice |
| 1991 | The Last Boy Scout | James Alexander "Jimmy" Dix | |
| 1992 | Mo' Money | Johnny Stewart | Also writer |
| 1993 | Last Action Hero | Himself | |
| 1994 | Blankman | Darryl Walker / Blankman | Also writer |
| 1995 | Major Payne | Major Benson Winifred Payne | Also writer |
| 1996 | Celtic Pride | Lewis Scott | |
| 1996 | The Great White Hype | James 'The Grim Reaper' Roper | |
| 1996 | Bulletproof | Detective Jack Carter / Rock Keats | |
| 1999 | Harlem Aria | Wes | |
| 1999 | Goosed | Dr. Steven Hemel | |
| 2000 | Bamboozled | Pierre Delacroix / Peerlees Dothan | |
| 2003 | Marci X | Dr. S. | |
| 2004 | Behind the Smile | Charlie Richman | |
| 2007 | Farce of the Penguins | Hey, That's My Ass! Penguin | Voice |
| 2011 | Herd Mentality | Jimmy Crowder | Short film |
| 2023 | Cinnamon | Wally | |

=== Television ===
| Year | Title | Role | Notes |
|---|---|---|---|
| 1985–1986 | Saturday Night Live | Himself / various characters | Main cast: Season 11 & hosted 1995 episode |
| 1986 | Triplecross | Ornery Character No. 1 | Television film |
| 1987 | Sweet Surrender | Ray | Episode: "The Holdens Go to Dinner" |
| 1987 | A Different World | Marvin Haven | Episode: "War of the Words" |
| 1989 | One Night Stand | Himself | Episode: "Damon Wayans" |
| 1990–1993 | In Living Color | Himself / various characters | Main cast (seasons 1–3); recurring guest star (season 4) |
| 1996–1997 | Waynehead | —N/a | Co-creator and executive producer |
| 1997–1998 | 413 Hope St. | —N/a | Co-creator and executive producer |
| 1998 | Damon | Damon Thomas | Main cast; also co-creator and executive producer |
| 2001–2005 | My Wife and Kids | Michael Kyle | Main cast; also executive producer |
| 2004–2006 | Rodney | —N/a | Co-creator and executive producer |
| 2006 | The Underground | Himself / various characters | Main cast; also producer |
| 2006 | Legends Bells | Himself | Television film |
| 2008 | Never Better | Keith | Television film |
| 2011 | Happy Endings | Francis Williams | Episode: "Like Father, Like Gun" |
| 2016–2019 | Lethal Weapon | Roger Murtaugh | Main cast |
| 2018 | Happy Together | Mike Davis | Episode: "Like Father, Like Son" |
| 2021 | Live in Front of a Studio Audience | Willis Drummond | Episode: "Diff'rent Strokes and The Facts of Life" |
| 2024–2025 | Poppa's House | Damon "Poppa" Fulton | Lead role; also, co-creator and executive producer |
| 2026 | The Varnell Hill Show | Himself | Episode: "Pay the Piper" |
| 2026 | St. Denis Medical | Dr. Highland | |

=== Comedy specials ===
| Year | Title |
|---|---|
| 1991 | Damon Wayans: The Last Stand? |
| 1997 | Damon Wayans: Still Standing |

=== Documentary ===
| Year | Title |
|---|---|
| 2009 | Why We Laugh: Black Comedians on Black Comedy |
| 2013 | The Improv: 50 Years Behind the Brick Wall |
| 2025 | SNL50: Beyond Saturday Night |

== Books ==
- Wayans, Damon (1999). Bootleg. Harper. ISBN 978-0060193669.
- Wayans, Damon (2010). Red Hats: A Novel. Atria Books. ISBN 978-1439164617.

== Accolades ==
| Award | Year | Category | Nominated work | Result | Ref. |
|---|---|---|---|---|---|
| BET Comedy Awards | 2004 | Outstanding Lead Actor in a Comedy Series | My Wife and Kids | Won | |
| BET Comedy Awards | 2005 | Outstanding Lead Actor in a Comedy Series | My Wife and Kids | Nominated | |
| MTV Movie Awards | 1992 | Best On-Screen Duo (shared with Bruce Willis) | The Last Boy Scout | Nominated | |
| NAACP Image Awards | 2002 | Outstanding Actor in a Comedy Series | My Wife and Kids | Nominated | |
| NAACP Image Awards | 2003 | Outstanding Actor in a Comedy Series | My Wife and Kids | Nominated | |
| NAACP Image Awards | 2004 | Outstanding Actor in a Comedy Series | My Wife and Kids | Nominated | |
| NAACP Image Awards | 2005 | Outstanding Actor in a Comedy Series | My Wife and Kids | Nominated | |
| NAACP Image Awards | 2024 | Outstanding Supporting Actor in a Television Movie, Limited Series or Dramatic Special | Cinnamon | Nominated | |
| NAACP Image Awards | 2025 | Outstanding Actor in a Comedy Series | Poppa's House | Won | |
| People's Choice Awards | 2002 | Favorite Male Performer in a New Television Series | My Wife and Kids | Won | |
| People's Choice Awards | 2017 | Favorite Actor In A New TV Series | Himself | Nominated | |
| Primetime Emmy Awards | 1990 | Outstanding Writing in a Variety or Music Program | In Living Color | Nominated | |
| Primetime Emmy Awards | 1991 | Outstanding Writing in a Variety or Music Program | In Living Color | Nominated | |
| Primetime Emmy Awards | 1991 | Outstanding Individual Performance in a Variety or Music Program | In Living Color | Nominated | |
| Primetime Emmy Awards | 1992 | Outstanding Individual Achievement in Writing in a Variety or Music Program | In Living Color | Nominated | |
| Satellite Awards | 2003 | Best Actor in a Series, Comedy or Musical | My Wife and Kids | Nominated | |
| Satellite Awards | 2005 | Best Actor in a Series, Comedy or Musical | My Wife and Kids | Nominated | |
| Teen Choice Awards | 2018 | Choice TV Actor: Action | Lethal Weapon | Nominated | |
