= 28th People's Choice Awards =

Pop culture award show held in 2002

- Date: January 13, 2002
- Location: Shrine Auditorium, Los Angeles, California
- Hosted by: Kevin James

Television/radio coverage
- Network: CBS

The 28th People's Choice Awards, honoring the best in American popular culture for 2001, were held on January 13, 2002 at the Shrine Auditorium in Los Angeles, California. They were hosted by Kevin James, and broadcast on CBS.

== Awards ==
Winners are listed first, in bold.

Favorite New TV Comedy	Favorite Female Musical Performer
**My Wife and Kids**	Faith Hill
Favorite Motion Picture	Favorite Daytime Serial
**Shrek**	Days of Our Lives
Favorite Male TV Performer	Favorite Male Musical Performer
**Kelsey Grammer**; **Ray Romano**	Garth Brooks
Favorite Musical Group Or Band	Favorite Reality/Game Show
***NSYNC**	Survivor
Favorite Female Performer In A New TV Series	Favorite Female TV Performer
**Reba McEntire**	Jennifer Aniston
Favorite Motion Picture Actor	Favorite TV Comedy
**Tom Hanks**	Friends
Favorite TV Drama	Favorite Motion Picture Actress
**ER**	Julia Roberts
Favorite Actor In A Comedy Motion Picture	Favorite Male Performer In A New TV Series
**Eddie Murphy**	Damon Wayans
Favorite New TV Dramatic Series	Favorite Actor In A Dramatic Motion Picture
**Alias**	Tom Hanks
