= Mr. Wrong Number =

2022 novel by Lynn Painter

- First edition cover art
- Author: Lynn Painter
- Cover artist: Nathan Burton
- Language: English
- Genre: Contemporary romance
- Publisher: Berkley Books
- Publication date: March 1, 2022
- Pages: 352
- ISBN: 9780593437261

Mr. Wrong Number is a contemporary romance novel by American author Lynn Painter. It was published on March 1, 2022 by Berkley Books. It is Painter's adult debut.

== Synopsis ==
After losing her job and getting cheated on by her boyfriend Eli, Olivia Marshall accidentally sets fire to her apartment building while burning Eli's old love letters. Now homeless, Olivia leaves Chicago and moves into her brother's apartment in their hometown of Omaha. When she arrives, she realizes that her brother's lifelong best friend Colin Beck is living there as well. Ever since they were children, Colin has never taken her seriously, while Olivia finds him attractive but obnoxious. After getting a wrong-number text, she starts communicating with the stranger, whom she dubs "Mr. Wrong Number". At first casual, a real connection develops between the two strangers. However, Colin is Mr. Wrong Number, and when he finds out Olivia is the woman he has dubbed "Miss Misdial", he cuts off the texting relationship before she can find out. However, he is finding it difficult to ignore his growing interest in Olivia.

== Reception ==
Kirkus Reviews praised the banter and physical connection between the two leads, but wrote that several sources of tension come to a head too early, while other conflicts are too easily resolved. Stephanie Klose of Library Journal criticized the banter as "lackluster" and wrote that Painter "overdoes the klutzy-but-intrepid heroine trope by a factor of 10". Suzanne Krohn of Shelf Awareness, however, praised the novel for subverting the trope of the clumsy heroine, and called the banter "charming and funny". Andrea Reid of The Nerd Daily also praised the novel's banter, calling it "really entertaining to read".

== Spinoff ==
A spinoff titled The Love Wager was published in 2023. It follows Olivia's brother Jack and a new character named Hallie Piper, who, after a one-night stand at Olivia and Colin's wedding, decide to place a bet to motivate each other to find love.
