= A Colony =

- French: Une colonie
- Directed by: Geneviève Dulude-De Celles
- Written by: Geneviève Dulude-De Celles
- Produced by: Fanny Drew; Sarah Mannering
- Starring: Émilie Bierre; Cassandra Gosselin-Pelletier; Jacob Whiteduck-Lavoie; Irlande Côté; Robin Aubert
- Cinematography: Léna Mill-Reuillard; Étienne Roussy
- Edited by: Stéphane Lafleur
- Music by: Mathieu Charbonneau
- Release date: September 15, 2018 (QCFF)
- Running time: 102 minutes
- Country: Canada
- Language: French

A Colony (French: Une colonie) is a Canadian drama film from Quebec, directed by Geneviève Dulude-De Celles and released in 2018. The film centres on Mylia (Émilie Bierre), a young girl starting high school who is torn between her new friendships with Jacinthe (Cassandra Gosselin-Pelletier), a bad influence who encourages her to experiment with sex and alcohol, and Jimmy (Jacob Whiteduck-Lavoie), an artistic First Nations student. The film's cast also includes Irlande Côté as Mylia's younger sister Camille, and Noémie Godin-Vigneau and Robin Aubert as their parents.

== Plot ==
In rural Quebec, Mylia begins high school while living with her younger sister Camille and her parents, Nathalie and Henri. They live on the border of an Abenaki First Nation reserve and Camille struggles with being bullied by her peers, with Mylia being her only friend. When Mylia gets to high school, she finds her locker is next to her cousin Gab, but Gab is cold to her. Mylia is placed in a history and citizenship class. There, she meets Jacinthe. Jacinthe notices that Mylia takes notes in history class and asks for Mylia's help with the course, to avoid a failing grade. The two girls meet and collaborate on their homework; afterwards, Jacinthe invites Mylia to a party. Mylia goes, and begins drinking alcohol. Intoxicated, she leaves and vomits. She wakes up in a home on a reserve, where a local boy Jimmy lives, and Jimmy's grandmother lets her recover on her couch. When Mylia returns home, she finds her father Henri on the couch for the night, and denies she was drinking.

Mylia becomes increasingly acquainted with Jimmy as he allows Camille to use his trampoline. In history class, the students discuss their readings on the Europeans' early contact with indigenous peoples in Quebec. When students begin asking about passages about the indigenous people's depravity (from the racist perspective of the European settlers), Jimmy becomes angered and has a physical altercation with the boys in the halls. He is afterwards suspended. Jacinthe invites Mylia to a Halloween party, where she and her friends plan to dress as the Fifth Harmony. Although the party falls on Camille's birthday, Mylia agrees to join. Later, Mylia meets with Jimmy. Jimmy, who says Halloween costumes reveal one's true self, discloses he will be dressing as an "Indian". Mylia says she will be dressing with her friends as the Fifth Harmony, and is offended when Jimmy criticizes her for dressing as a "slut".

Camille is upset when she learns Mylia will not be at her birthday party and only her parents will be there. At the party, Mylia is peer-pressured by her friends to make out with a boy, Vincent, but becomes uncomfortable with the sexual nature of his advances and puts a stop to them. She leaves and meets Jimmy. At home, Nathalie and Henri sit Mylia and Camille down for a talk, where they reveal they are undergoing a separation. Mylia and Camille are upset to learn their mother is moving them out of a house. Mylia leaves the home and sees Jimmy, and tells him she loves him. After time passes, Mylia is attending a new school. She writes to Jimmy about learning about the Scramble for Africa, and about how none of her classmates believed her when she said she was from a forest and her friend is an "Abenaki warrior". Mylia writes her peers find her unusual, but concludes by saying she does not want to be like everyone else.

== Cast ==
- Robin Aubert as Henri
- Émilie Bierre as Mylia
- Irlande Côté as Camille
- Noémie Godin-Vigneau as Nathalie
- Cassandra Gosselin-Pelletier as Jacinthe
- Jacob Whiteduck-Lavoie as Jimmy

== Release ==
The film premiered at the 2018 Quebec City Film Festival. It went into general theatrical release in early 2019, and was screened at the 2019 Berlin Film Festival in the Generation Kplus program.

== Accolades ==
The film received seven nominations at the 7th Canadian Screen Awards in 2019, for Best Picture, Best Actress (Bierre), Best Supporting Actor (Whiteduck-Lavoie), Best Supporting Actress (Côté), Best Director (Dulude-De Celles), Best Costume Design (Eugénie Clermont) and the John Dunning Best First Feature Award.

Award	Date of ceremony	Category	Recipient(s)	Result	Ref(s)
Berlin International Film Festival	7–17 February 2019	Crystal Bear		Won	
Canadian Screen Awards	31 March 2019	Best Motion Picture	Fanny Drew, Sarah Mannering	Won	
Canadian Screen Awards	31 March 2019	Best Director	Geneviève Dulude-De Celles	Nominated	
Canadian Screen Awards	31 March 2019	Best Actress	Émilie Bierre	Won	
Canadian Screen Awards	31 March 2019	Best Supporting Actor	Jacob Whiteduck-Lavoie	Nominated	
Canadian Screen Awards	31 March 2019	Best Supporting Actress	Irlande Côté	Nominated	
Canadian Screen Awards	31 March 2019	Best Costume Design	Eugénie Clermont	Nominated	
Canadian Screen Awards	31 March 2019	Best First Feature	Geneviève Dulude-De Celles	Won	
Prix Iris	2 June 2019	Best Film	Fanny Drew, Sarah Mannering	Nominated	
Prix Iris	2 June 2019	Best Director	Geneviève Dulude-DeCelles	Nominated	
Prix Iris	2 June 2019	Best Screenplay	Geneviève Dulude-DeCelles	Nominated	
Prix Iris	2 June 2019	Best Supporting Actor	Robin Aubert	Won	
Prix Iris	2 June 2019	Revelation of the Year	Émilie Bierre	Won	
Prix Iris	2 June 2019	Revelation of the Year	Irlande Côté	Nominated	
Prix Iris	2 June 2019	Revelation of the Year	Jacob Whiteduck-Lavoie	Nominated	
Prix Iris	2 June 2019	Best Casting	Ariane Castellanos	Won	
Quebec City Film Festival	September 2018	Grand Prix		Won	
Whistler Film Festival	December 2018	Best Canadian Feature		Won	
Whistler Film Festival	December 2018	Best Director	Geneviève Dulude-De Celles	Won	
Whistler Film Festival	December 2018	Best Performance	Émilie Bierre	Won	
