= Fake Skating =

2025 novel by Lynn Painter

- First edition hardcover
- Author: Lynn Painter
- Cover artist: Sarah Creech
- Language: English
- Genre: Young adult, contemporary romance
- Publisher: Simon & Schuster
- Publication date: September 30, 2025
- Pages: 448
- ISBN: 9781665921268

Fake Skating is a young adult romance novel by American author Lynn Painter. It was published by Simon & Schuster on September 30, 2025. It centers a fake relationship between an academically gifted high school senior and her ice hockey–playing childhood sweetheart. It was a number one New York Times Best Seller for fifteen weeks. A film adaption by Sony Pictures was announced in 2026 and is set for release on July 16, 2027.

== Development ==
Painter came up with the concept of Fake Skating after noticing a lack of hockey-centered romantic comedies set in high school. To prepare, she traveled from her hometown of Omaha to Minnesota to witness the ice hockey-focused culture of her novel's setting. As she wrote more about hockey and the culture and sense of community surrounding it, the novel became less about ice hockey and fake dating and more about found families and finding one's place in the world.

== Synopsis ==
Following her parents' divorce, high school senior Dani Collins and her mother moves in with Dani's prolific former ice hockey-playing grandfather in Southview, Minneapolis, where she spent a month every summer as a child. There, she reunites with her childhood sweetheart Alec Barczewski. While Dani is wondering why Alec stopped contacting her, Alec is focused on maintaining his image as the star of the high school hockey team, and believes that Dani broke his heart several years ago. While Dani is looking for an extracurricular activity in order to leave Harvard's waitlist, Alec is looking to restore his reputation with NHL scouts after a picture of him with a bong appears on social media. They decide to fake a romantic relationship so that Alec can impress the NHL scouts by having an academically gifted girlfriend related to a prolific former hockey player, while Dani can get a team manager position that will draw the attention of Harvard. As they reconnect, the fake romance becomes real.

== Reception ==
The novel won a Goodreads Choice Award for Best Young Adult Fiction. As of April 13, 2026, the novel has spent twenty-eight weeks in the New York Times' Young Adult Hardcover Best Seller list, topping the list for fifteen of those weeks.

Publishers Weekly praised Dani and Alec's chemistry and described the world of the novel as "tangible". Kirkus Reviews praised the characters for feeling like real teenagers and described the novel as "well-paced" and the romance as "compelling". Sara Brunkhorst of School Library Journal called the novel "seemingly formulaic at times" but praised it for its accurate portrayal of high school relationships.

== Film adaptation ==
A film adaption was announced in 2026. The adaptation is set to be produced by Sony Pictures and Will Gluck's Olive Bridge. The film has been dated for a July 16, 2027 release date, with Josh Boone attached to helm. In September 2026, it was announced that Graham Campbell and Amélie Hoeferle were cast as the leads. In November 2026, Bruce Greenwood, Johnny Knoxville, and Dylan Hawco joined the cast.
