= Dounia and the Princess of Aleppo =

- French: Dounia et la princesse d'Alep
- Directed by: André Kadi; Marya Zarif
- Written by: Marya Zarif; Halima Elkhatabi; Luis Molinié
- Produced by: Judith Beauregard
- Music by: Pierre Yves Drapeau
- Production company: Tobo Média
- Distributed by: Haut et Court Distribution
- Release date: June 15, 2022 (Annecy)
- Running time: 72 minutes
- Countries: Canada; France
- Language: French

Dounia and the Princess of Aleppo (French: Dounia et la princesse d'Alep) is a Canadian/French animated film, directed by André Kadi and Marya Zarif and released in 2022. The film centres on Dounia, a young Syrian girl who is leaving her hometown of Aleppo with her grandparents to find a new place to live following the outbreak of the Syrian Civil War.

The film's voice cast includes Rachaf Ataya as Dounia, as well as Elsa Mardorissian, Manuel Tadros, Raia Haidar, Marya Zarif, Naim Jeanbart, Mustapha Aramis, Houssam Ataya and Irlande Côté.

The film premiered in June 2022 at the Annecy International Animation Film Festival.

== Plot ==
Six-year-old Dounia lives in Aleppo with her family. Following the death of her mother and the arrest of her father, Dounia has been raised by her paternal grandparents, Darwich and Mouné. The outbreak of the Syrian Civil War makes life difficult for the family. They finally decide to flee Aleppo after their home is bombed, along with their neighbour Georgette Darbouss, Georgette's daughter Lina, the spice seller Abdo, Abdo's wife Nisrine, and their baby son Shams. Among the few possessions Dounia takes is a bird-shaped toy and a handful of baraka seeds. Ayn and Chand, two ancient sentient statues belonging to the family, follow them in their escape.

On the way to the Syria-Turkey border, the group picks up another refugee, the musician Djewane, and passes by a temple of the goddess Ishtar. Dounia uses one seed to summon Ishtar, who grows a temporary forest that allows the refugees to slip past the border patrol agents. The group travels to İzmir, where a smuggler intends to take them across the Aegean Sea into Greece. Their raft is caught in a storm, but another seed summons Leila, an ancient princess of Aleppo, who calms the seas. The group safely arrives in Greece and travels towards a refugee camp at the Macedonian border.

At the camp, Lina and Djewane become more affectionate, though the starving and cold refugees are stressed by the closed border. Dounia uses another seed to begin a big dance number that also affects the border agents. The refugees are allowed to travel into Europe.

In Budapest, Dounia, Darwich and Mouné initially plan to follow their friends to Germany, but are separated from the others due to a migrant quota. The three begin staying in a tent at the train station. Dounia writes a letter to their future house. After she "feeds" her toy bird a seed upon the suggestion of Ayn and Chand, it turns into a real bird and flies off with the letter. Various birds pass it on until it ends up in rural Canada, where the family of a little girl, Rosalie, has been hoping for tenants.

Rosalie's family helps Dounia and her grandparents emigrate to Canada. A year later, Dounia writes to her father (now making the trip himself, after being released) that they and their friends have settled in well, and that she hopes to be reunited with him soon.

== Awards ==
The film received an Asia Pacific Screen Award nomination for Best Animated Feature Film at the 15th Asia Pacific Screen Awards in 2022, and a Prix Iris nomination for Most Successful Film Outside Quebec at the 25th Quebec Cinema Awards in 2023.
