= Sterling Point =

American-Canadian romantic drama television series

- Release poster
- Genre: Drama
- Created by: Megan Park
- Showrunners: Megan Park; Josh Schwartz; Stephanie Savage
- Starring: Ella Rubin; Amélie Hoeferle; Jacob Whiteduck-Lavoie; Daniel Quinn-Toye; Bo Bragason; Keen Ruffalo; Mabel Strachan; Missi Pyle; Jay Duplass; Jeffrey Dean Morgan
- Composers: Tyler Hilton; Jaco Caraco
- Countries of origin: United States; Canada
- Original language: English
- No. of seasons: 1
- No. of episodes: 8

Production
- Executive producers: Megan Park; Josh Schwartz; Stephanie Savage; Tom Ackerley; Dani Gorin
- Producers: Anna Beben; Margot Robbie; Louie Hayes
- Cinematography: Kristen Correll; Ante Cheng
- Editors: David Greenspan; D. Gillian Truster; Jorge Weisz; Gabi Arno
- Running time: 44–51 minutes
- Production companies: LuckyChap; Fake Empire; Heart Fugue Productions; Reunion Pacific Entertainment; Amazon MGM Studios

Original release
- Network: Amazon Prime Video
- Release: August 5, 2026 – present

Sterling Point is a drama television series created by Megan Park and starring Ella Rubin, Amélie Hoeferle, Jacob Whiteduck-Lavoie, Daniel Quinn-Toye, Bo Bragason, and Keen Ruffalo. The series premiered on Amazon Prime Video on August 5, 2026. That same month, the series was renewed for a second season.

== Premise ==
Annie Jacobson's (Ella Rubin) life takes a turn when she and her twin brother, Connor (Keen Ruffalo) inherit their mysterious grandfather’s island. After traveling to Muskoka, Canada, to check out her late grandfather's cottage, Annie meets Ramona (Amélie Hoeferle), a local girl who was also named as an heir. While sharing the cottage, Annie and Ramona navigate complex relationships, and Annie also forms budding romances with Ellis (Jacob Whiteduck-Lavoie) and Rory (Daniel Quinn-Toye). Spending the summer in Muskoka, Annie finds new friends and untold family secrets.

== Cast ==
=== Main ===
- Ella Rubin as Annie Jacobson, a 17-year-old girl from New York who travels to Muskoka, Canada, to investigate her deceased adoptive mother's past
- Amélie Hoeferle as Ramona, a girl who lives in Muskoka
- Jacob Whiteduck-Lavoie as Ellis, a seaplane pilot and boater from Muskoka
- Daniel Quinn-Toye as Rory, Annie's former classmate and friend from New York who reconnects with her
- Bo Bragason as Oona, Ramona's best friend
- Keen Ruffalo as Connor Jacobson, Annie's twin brother
- Mabel Strachan as Maple, Oona's younger sister
- Missi Pyle as Denise Ballantine, Rory's mother
- Jay Duplass as Steven Jacobson, Annie and Connor's adoptive father
- Jeffrey Dean Morgan as Joe, Ellis' father

=== Recurring ===
- Nikko Angelo Hinayo as Sully, a close friend of Oona and Ellis
- Elle-Máijá Tailfeathers as Kate, Joe's wife and Ellis' mother

== Episodes ==
No.	Title	Directed by	Written by	Original release date
1	"But I Just Took an Ambien"	Megan Park	Megan Park	August 5, 2026
Annie Jacobson, a 17-year-old from New York, is rejected from a summer program at Wharton. Shortly thereafter, she and her twin brother, Connor, learn that their maternal grandfather, Gordon, whom they had never met, has passed away, leaving them a trust fund and Sterling Point, a property located on an island in the Muskoka region of Canada. Steven, their adoptive father, reacts negatively to the news and hides the letters that Gordon had left for them. Annie retrieves the letters and discovers that Gordon urges her to go to Sterling Point to uncover the truth and find "her", a woman who will need her help now that he is gone. Without revealing her true intentions to her father, Annie travels to Canada. Upon arriving on the island, Annie meets Ellis, a seaplane pilot who takes her to the property. Inside Gordon’s cabin, she finds photographs of her late mother and begins to investigate her family’s past. Annie heads to the local marina, where she meets Joe, the owner and Ellis’s father. She attempts to rent a boat, but since she lacks a license, Oona, a local girl, offers to teach her. Meanwhile, Joe and Ellis discuss the fact that Annie has suddenly occupied Gordon’s cabin. Joe contacts Gordon’s lawyer seeking answers, and the lawyer asks whether he has spoken to "her" yet, referring to a mysterious woman. Later, Annie attends a party with Ellis and Oona, where she runs into Rory, a former schoolmate, and learns through his mother, Denise, that her parents had visited Sterling Point before she and Connor were born, and that her mother had initiated divorce proceedings. When Annie returns to the cabin, she finds an unknown young woman inside. The girl seems unsettled by Annie’s presence and finally demands: “What are you doing in my grandfather’s cottage?”.
2	"She's Giving Single & Bi"	Megan Park	Megan Park	August 5, 2026
The young woman Annie encounters at Gordon's cottage is revealed to be Ramona, his granddaughter, and the biological daughter of Goldie, Annie’s late stepmother, who bears a striking resemblance to her. Ramona orders Annie to leave, but after finding her crying outside, reluctantly allows her to stay for the night. The following morning, Annie attempts to leave the island by canoe but loses her paddle and is rescued by Rory, who offers her a place to stay. Meanwhile, Ramona reunites with Oona, Ellis, Maple (Oona's younger sister) and Sully (a close friend of the group), joining them to work at the marina. She later explains to Oona that she had been away for a year, caring for Gordon during his final days. After discovering that Annie has taken one of Goldie's photographs, Ramona confronts her. Annie reveals that Goldie was also her mother, explaining that both she and Connor were adopted at birth and that Goldie passed away when they were two years old. Ramona refuses to believe they are sisters and insists that Annie leave the island. While Annie considers returning to New York, Ramona struggles to open a final letter left by Gordon, and though she doesn't read it herself, she lets Oona read it instead, who confirms that Annie has been telling the truth. Later, Ramona allows Annie to stay in the cottage.
3	"My Lifelong Debilitating Wolf Phobia"	Aurora Guerrero	Warren Hsu Leonard	August 5, 2026
Annie and Ramona begin adjusting to life together as sisters at Sterling Point, although they are still navigating their complicated relationship. When Ramona starts clearing out Gordon's belongings to prepare the cottage for winter, Annie discovers a box of their late mother Goldie's possessions, including a mixtape she recorded as a teenager. Hoping to learn more about her mother's past, Annie secretly keeps the tape and organizes a small gathering at the cottage to thank Ramona for letting her stay. After listening to the recording with Ramona, they discover Goldie's and Gordon's voice in the background, but Ramona becomes overwhelmed and walks away. Annie continues listening and realizes the mixtape was originally made for Joe, who reveals that he and Goldie dated when they were younger. Meanwhile, Ramona struggles with her feelings for Oona, while Ellis grows increasingly uncomfortable with Annie's closeness to Rory. At the gathering, Ramona becomes jealous when she sees Oona arriving with another girl, Stacy Malory, and Annie spends some time with Rory. During a brief moment outside the cottage, Ramona and Oona nearly kiss, while Annie and Rory share a kiss of their own, witnessed by Ellis. Later, Annie and Ramona open up about their romantic interests and begin developing a genuine sisterly bond. However, their newfound closeness is interrupted when Connor unexpectedly arrives from New York, determined to sell Sterling Point.
4	"Take Me to the Cliffs"	Aurora Guerrero	Erica Lipez	August 5, 2026
Connor arrives at Sterling Point determined to sell the island and turn his inheritance into a business opportunity. Since he, Annie and Ramona each own an equal share, Annie and Ramona refuse to agree to the sale. Annie eventually convinces Connor to spend a week on the island before making his final decision, and he asks to visit the famous cliffs. Meanwhile, Ellis receives a call from Gordon's lawyer seeking Ramona's contact information, raising questions about his father's involvement in Gordon's affairs. As the group heads to the cliffs, Ellis invites Annie to the town's movie night, although she mistakenly assumes it is a group outing. At the cliffs, Annie struggles to join the others in jumping into the lake and instead spends time alone with Rory, with whom she later shares another kiss. Meanwhile, Ramona and Oona grow increasingly close, and Oona suggests that they attend the movie night together, although the nature of their relationship remains uncertain. During movie night, Ramona begins drinking heavily, feeling anxious about the date and encouraged by Connor to drink, when she becomes jealous after seeing Oona with Stacy Malory and confronts them, upsetting Oona with her behavior, who rudely rejects the idea of them being together. Annie spends time with Ellis, but they get interrupted by Rory and Lincoln, whose dismissive treatment towards Ellis creates further tension. Later, Annie and Ellis find Ramona intoxicated and help take her back to the marina. There, Joe reacts with concern and remarks that this is exactly what Gordon had feared. When Annie demands an explanation, Joe finally reveals a devastating secret: Goldie died while giving birth to Ramona, and he was present when it happened.
5	"I'm Not a Shots Girl Either"	Megan Park	Jared Frieder	August 5, 2026
Following Joe's revelation that Goldie died giving birth to Ramona, Annie struggles with the news and eventually decides to tell her sister the truth. Devastated, Ramona blames herself for her mother's death and withdraws from everyone. Meanwhile, the twin's eighteenth birthday is coming up, and though Annie has never celebrated their shared birthday, she makes plans to spend it with Rory, while Connor prepares for his own birthday party. At the marina, Ellis discovers legal documents revealing that Joe was appointed Ramona's guardian after Gordon's death, raising further questions about their relationship. Oona argues with her sister Maple regarding their mother's lack of interest in them. Maple goes to Ramona, who helps her cope with the grief of her absence, as she also begins coming to terms with her own emotions and reconciles with Oona. Meanwhile, Ellis finds another recording on Goldie's old mixtape, in which she speaks directly to Joe about her pregnancy. Ellis leaves the mixtape for his father, urging him to finally come clean. At Connor's party, Denise approaches Connor with a tempting offer to buy Sterling Point. After leaving Maple at summer camp, Ramona and Oona admit their feelings for each other and finally share a kiss. Elsewhere, Annie goes out with Rory to celebrate her birthday, reconnecting with old friends from New York; she lets herself enjoy the night, drinks and dances with Rory, and eventually kisses him. The two return to his house and end up sleeping together, although Annie lies when he asks whether she has had sex before.
6	"I Still Bleed Through My Pants all the Time"	Andrew Ahn	Raffi Donatich	August 5, 2026
After spending the night with Rory, Annie unexpectedly encounters her father, Steven, who has traveled to Canada to find her. During dinner, Steven finally explains that he kept Ramona's birth a secret to hide Goldie's affair with Joe, which happened while their marriage was failing. Once Goldie got pregnant and filed for divorce, Steven brought a lawyer to Canada to take Annie and Connor back to New York, a revelation that leaves Annie even angrier at her father. Later, the friends go to Maple's summer camp's last-day talent show, where Annie and Ellis grow closer, and Ramona explores her new relationship with Oona. At the same time, Steven confronts Joe about his past with Goldie, and the two end up physically fighting. Later, Annie and Ellis discuss the identity of Ramona's father again, but he insists that Joe must be the one to reveal the truth. However, Denise gets ahead of them and announces in front of everyone that Joe is Ramona's biological father. Upon discovering that Annie and Ellis already knew the secret and had kept it from her, Ramona feels betrayed and runs away.
7	"Maybe It's Mackerel"	Andrew Ahn	Story by : Warren Hsu Leonard & Jared Lopez; Teleplay by : Jared Lopez & Raffi Donatich	August 5, 2026
Ramona disappears after discovering that Joe is supposedly her biological father and that Annie and Ellis knew the truth but kept it from her. Everyone searches for her, and Oona eventually finds her at Gordon’s old house in Barrie, where she comforts her and confesses she loves her. Back at Sterling Point, Annie and Ellis finally kiss, while Rory decides he is not ready to give up on Annie. When Ramona returns, she apologizes to Annie for running away and explains that she has consulted a lawyer because she wants Joe to give up his legal guardianship of her. She later confronts him about his relationship with Goldie, and Joe admits that they had planned to raise her together before Goldie died, but he refuses to sign the papers. With Oona's support, Ramona finally reads Gordon’s letter. While looking for Steven, Annie encounters Rory, who offers to use his family’s connections to improve her chances of getting into Wharton and discusses their future together in New York. However, Annie reveals that she wants to stay at Sterling Point for a while, upsetting Rory, who suggests that her decision is really about Ellis. Annie later tells Ramona that she no longer wants to leave Sterling Point and shares her feelings for Ellis. During their conversation, Annie mentions that Steven is colorblind, and Ramona realizes that she has the same condition. This raises doubts about Joe being her biological father, prompting Ramona to research the possibility and eventually approach Steven with a DNA test, questioning whether he might actually be her father instead.
8	"I'm the Kid"	Megan Park	Story by : Megan Park & Raffi Donatich; Teleplay by : Megan Park & Katie Boland	August 5, 2026
The DNA test finally reveals that Steven, not Joe, is Ramona’s biological father. The discovery changes everything for the family, particularly Annie, who struggles with the fact that Steven and Goldie had a biological daughter while she and Connor were adopted. She eventually confronts her father about having been forced to grow up too quickly and take responsibility for his grief, prompting Steven to apologize for the burden he placed on her. Meanwhile, Ramona tells Oona about Steven being her real father and considers moving to New York to get to know him, but their differing views about the future ultimately lead to their breakup. As Annie prepares to leave Sterling Point, Ramona decides that she wants to sell the island, believing it is time to move forward. Annie initially disagrees but eventually asks her sister to give her just one more year to learn more about Goldie and her past. Meanwhile, Connor receives a call from the adoption agency informing him that his biological mother wants to meet him. In the end, Annie and Ramona decide to switch places: Ramona moves to New York to build a relationship with Steven, while Annie stays at Sterling Point, hoping to learn more about the mother she never got to know.

== Production ==
=== Development ===
On January 29, 2025, Amazon Prime Video gave production a series order for Sterling Point. The series is created by Megan Park who is also expected to executive produce and co-showrun alongside Josh Schwartz and Stephanie Savage. Production companies involved in producing the series are Fake Empire, LuckyChap, and Amazon MGM Studios. On August 20, 2026, the series was renewed for a second season.

=== Casting ===
On April 23, 2025, Ella Rubin, Jacob Whiteduck-Lavoie and Amélie Hoeferle were cast in lead roles. On June 6, 2025, Daniel Quinn-Toye, Bo Bragason, and Keen Ruffalo joined the starring cast. On July 11, 2025, Jeffrey Dean Morgan and Jay Duplass were cast in recurring capacities. On September 8, 2025, Missi Pyle, Nikko Angelo Hinayo, Mabel Strachan, and Elle-Maija Tailfeathers joined the cast in recurring roles.

=== Filming ===
Principal photography for the series began on June 26, 2025, and concluded on October 10, 2025, in the Muskoka Lakes area north of Toronto, Canada.

== Release ==
Sterling Point was released on Amazon Prime Video on August 5, 2026, with all eight episodes.

== Reception ==
On the review aggregator website Rotten Tomatoes, the first season holds an 91% approval rating based on 44 critic reviews, with an average rating of 6.9/10. The website's critical consensus reads, "Megan Park expertly crafts a coming-of-age drama with plenty of early aughts nostalgia that rises above its class, setting sail with audiences' expectations and delighting all who seek to take their hearts on a solid adventure." Metacritic, which uses a weighted average, gave a score of 76 out of 100 based on 17 critics, indicating "generally favorable" reviews.

Critics have praised the show's pacing and acting, comparing it to 1990s dramas such as Dawson's Creek (1998–2003) and My So-Called Life (1994–1995). The show's ability to transcend the limits of the coming-of-age and young adult niche landscape by effectively incorporating family-mystery elements has also been well received. According to Variety: "it offers viewers of a certain age an air of nostalgia while giving Gen Z and Gen Alpha viewers a distinct level of realism that has been missing from recent series with similar tropes." Commenting on pacing, The Los Angeles Times noted: "What makes Sterling Point work so beautifully is its rare, real, unhurried sense of time; it stretches out the way days do when you're young, a sense heightened by the fact that Annie speaks twice as fast and as much as anyone else in the series."

Sterling Point has been compared to similar shows like The Summer I Turned Pretty (2022–2025), Cruel Intentions (2024) and Off Campus (2026–present), while noting that its focus on grief, self-discovery and family mysteries sets it apart from the genre's tendency to focus on romance, love and sexual awakenings.
