= Betting on You =

2023 novel by Lynn Painter

- First edition cover art
- Author: Lynn Painter
- Cover artist: Sarah Creech
- Language: English
- Genre: Contemporary romance, young adult
- Publisher: Simon & Schuster
- Publication date: November 28, 2023
- Pages: 432
- ISBN: 9781665921251

Betting on You is a young adult romance novel by American author Lynn Painter. It was published by Simon & Schuster on November 28, 2023.

== Background ==
Painter was inspired by When Harry Met Sally when writing Betting on You, and described it as her "YA spin" on the film.

== Synopsis ==
Following her parents divorce, fourteen-year-old Bailey moves from Alaska to Omaha with her mother. On the flight, she meets Charlie, a sharp-tongued and cynical boy with whom she disagrees on everything, including on whether boys and girls can be "just friends". Three years later, a now seventeen-year-old Bailey begins a new job at a hotel waterpark, and is shocked to learn that Charlie is among her coworkers. A rivalry builds between the two, but gradually the tension starts to ease as they begin observing the guests at the hotel. The two unearth their old disagreement on opposite-sex friendships, and so they decide to turn this disagreement into a wager as they track the romantic progress of other opposite-sex friendships while distracting themselves from their own growing romantic tension. These feelings become even more complicated as they pretend to be a couple in order to scare off Bailey's mother's new boyfriend, Scott, who she feels has upset the dynamic between her and her mother. Slowly, they find it increasingly difficult to ignore the real romantic tension between the two, and the line between performance and reality begins to blur.

== Reception ==
The novel spent fifteen weeks on the weekly New York Times Young Adult Hardcover Best Seller List and nine months on the monthly Young Adult Paperback List. It was nominated for a Goodreads Choice Award for Best Young Adult Fiction.

Publishers Weekly praised the novel for breathing "new life into a familiar premise". Aastha Raj of The Economic Times described the novel as a "light yet emotionally engaging read" that weaves themes of family change, emotional safety, and self-worth seamlessly into the narrative. Kirkus Reviews was disappointed by the novel, describing some of the banter as "more aggressive than playful" and describing the plot as "circuitous". Elizabeth Kahn left a negative review for School Library Journal, describing the characters' emotions as "inconsistent with their personalities" and stating that the strong language seems at odds with the tame romance.
