= Cry to Heaven (film) =

- Directed by: Tom Ford
- Screenplay by: Tom Ford
- Based on: Cry to Heaven by Anne Rice
- Produced by: Tom Ford
- Starring: Nicholas Hoult; Adele; Aaron Taylor-Johnson; Ciarán Hinds; George MacKay; Mark Strong; Colin Firth; Paul Bettany; Owen Cooper; Daniel Quinn-Toye; Hunter Schafer; Thandiwe Newton; Daryl McCormack; Cassian Bilton
- Cinematography: Benjamin Kračun
- Edited by: Joan Sobel
- Music by: Abel Korzeniowski
- Production company: Fade to Black
- Country: United States
- Language: English

Cry to Heaven is an upcoming American period drama film written, produced, and directed by Tom Ford. It is based on the 1982 novel by Anne Rice.

== Cast ==
- Nicholas Hoult as Guido
- Aaron Taylor-Johnson as Carlo
- Colin Firth
- Mark Strong as Calvino
- Ciarán Hinds as Andrea
- Adele
- George MacKay as Tonio
- Paul Bettany
- Owen Cooper
- Daniel Quinn-Toye
- Hunter Schafer as Christina
- Josephine Thiesen
- Thandiwe Newton
- Théodore Pellerin
- Daryl McCormack
- Cassian Bilton
- Hauk Hannemann
- Lux Pascal
- Ian Cioce
- Julianne Moore

== Production ==
In August 2025, it was reported that Tom Ford would write, produce, and direct an adaptation of Cry to Heaven by Anne Rice. In November 2025, Nicholas Hoult, Aaron Taylor-Johnson, Adele (making her acting debut), Ciarán Hinds, George MacKay, Mark Strong, Colin Firth, Paul Bettany, Owen Cooper, Daniel Quinn-Toye, Hunter Schafer, Josephine Thiesen, Thandiwe Newton, Théodore Pellerin, Daryl McCormack, Cassian Bilton, Hauk Hannemann, and Lux Pascal rounded out the cast. In May 2026, Julianne Moore revealed that she has a small role in the film.

Principal photography began in January 19, 2026, in Rome and wrapped on March 23, after a 9 week shoot, with Benjamin Kračun serving as the cinematographer.
