= Cinnamon (2023 film) =

- Release poster
- Directed by: Bryian Keith Montgomery Jr.
- Written by: Bryian Keith Montgomery Jr.
- Produced by: Kevin Garnett; Oz Scott
- Starring: Hailey Kilgore; Pam Grier; Damon Wayans
- Cinematography: Ayinde Anderson
- Edited by: Josh Porro
- Music by: Daniel Ciurlizza
- Production companies: Fox Entertainment Studios; Village Roadshow Pictures
- Distributed by: Tubi
- Release date: June 2023 (Tribeca)
- Running time: 92 minutes
- Country: United States
- Language: English

Cinnamon is a 2023 American thriller film written and directed by Bryian Keith Montgomery Jr. and starring Hailey Kilgore, Pam Grier and Damon Wayans, in his first film role since 2011.

== Cast ==
- Hailey Kilgore as Jodi Jackson
- David Iacono as Eddie
- Jeremie Harris as James Walker
- Pam Grier as Mama
- Damon Wayans as Wally

== Production ==
In March 2022, it was announced that Kilgore, Iacono and Harris were cast in the film with production occurring in Atlanta. In April 2022, it was announced that Wayans and Grier were added to the cast.

== Release ==
The film premiered at the Tribeca Festival in June 2023. It was released on Tubi on June 23, 2023.

== Reception ==
=== Critical response ===
The film has an 86% rating on Rotten Tomatoes based on seven reviews.

=== Accolades ===
Year	Award / Film Festival	Category	Recipients	Result	Ref.
2024	NAACP Image Awards	Outstanding Supporting Actor in a Television Movie, Limited Series or Dramatic Special	Damon Wayans	Nominated	
2024	NAACP Image Awards	Outstanding Directing in a Television Movie or Special	Bryian Keith Montgomery Jr.	Nominated	
2023	American Black Film Festival	Best Narrative Feature	Bryian Keith Montgomery Jr.	Won	
2023	American Black Film Festival	Best Director	Bryian Keith Montgomery Jr.	Won	
