= Better Than the Movies =

2021 novel by Lynn Painter

- First edition hardcover
- Author: Lynn Painter
- Cover artist: Sarah Creech
- Language: English
- Genre: Young adult, contemporary romance
- Set in: Nebraska
- Publisher: Simon & Schuster
- Publication date: May 4, 2021
- Pages: 368
- ISBN: 9781534467620
- Followed by: Nothing Like the Movies

Better Than the Movies is a young adult romance novel by American author Lynn Painter. It was published on May 4, 2021 by Simon & Schuster. It gained popularity through BookTok with the release of its paperback edition in 2022.

== Synopsis ==
Liz Buxbaum is a long-time fan of romantic comedies, which she uses to connect to her screenwriter mother, who died when she was a child. In her senior year of high school, she attempts to turn her romantic fantasies into reality, when her long-term crush Michael moves back to her hometown. Now that he is back, Liz is determined to draw his attention so that she can invite him to prom, and so convinces Wes Bennet—Liz's next-door neighbor and Michael's new friend—to feign interest in her, despite Wes being a source of irritation for Liz since they were children due to his constant pranks. But things grow complicated when Liz develops a genuine interest in Wes.

== Reception ==
In 2022, the book received a surge in popularity with the release of its paperback edition, which Painter credited to Haley Pham, who called it "the best romance book [she had] ever read." As of March 2026, it has spent 40 months on the monthly New York Times Young Adult Paperback Best Seller List. It spent two months in the number one position.

Kirkus Reviews called the novel a "charming, fluffy concoction [that] manages to pack into one goofy plot every conceivable trope". Mary Kamela of School Library Journal noted that fans of romantic comedies would likely be able to predict the direction of the story, but said that it was made enjoyable by its quippy banter, lovable characters, and "will-they-won't-they" tension. Ellis Cochrane gave the book four and a half stars in her review for The Independent, saying that the novel proves that you do not have to be a young adult to enjoy young adult literature.

== Sequel ==
In 2024, a sequel titled Nothing Like the Movies was released. It follows Wes and Liz in college, now broken up. It was nominated for a Goodreads Choice Award for Best Young Adult Fiction.

== Film adaptation ==
In May 2026, a film adaptation was announced to be in development at Netflix, hiring Julia Hart to direct. Hart also co-wrote a draft with her husband and creative partner Jordan Horowitz, who will also produce.

In July 2026, Beatrice Kitsos and David Iacono were cast as Liz Buxbaum and Wes Bennett respectively. In September, Deacon Phillippe, Nicole Bruner, Luke Kirby, Judy Greer, Claire Coffee, Ora Duplass, Veronica Garrubbo and Kynlee Heiman joined the cast.
