= Daniel Quinn-Toye =

Scottish actor

- Education: London Academy of Music and Dramatic Art
- Occupation: Actor
- Years active: 2021–present

Daniel Quinn-Toye is a Scottish stage, television, and film actor.

== Biography ==
Quinn-Toye is from Cumbernauld near Glasgow. Quinn-Toye studied at the Dance School of Scotland and the London Academy of Music and Dramatic Arts (LAMDA). He made his professional debut in the West End Theatre production of Romeo and Juliet at the Duke of York's Theatre in the role of Paris. He was also the understudy to Tom Holland's Romeo. He had an early role on BBC Three comedy television series Badults.

In October 2024, Quinn-Toye was cast in the lead role of the science fiction action film Voltron, featuring alongside Henry Cavill and filmed for six months in Australia. He has a leading role in George Jaques' coming-of-age comedy-drama Sunny Dancer alongside Bella Ramsey. The film was nominated for Best Ensemble Performance at the British Independent Film Awards.

Quinn-Toye stars as Rory Ballantine in the Amazon Prime Video young adult series Sterling Point, and portrays Michael Gregory in the historical drama Pressure. He was named a Screen International Star of Tomorrow in 2025. That year, he was cast in the Tom Ford film Cry to Heaven.

== Filmography ==
=== Film ===
Year	Title	Role	Notes
2026	Sunny Dancer	Jake	
2026	Pressure	Michael Gregory	
2027	Voltron †	Keith Kogane	Post-production
2027	Cry to Heaven †		Post-production
TBA	Pumping Black †		Filming

=== Television ===
Year	Title	Role	Notes
2014	Badults	Kid Tom	1 episode
2026–present	Sterling Point	Rory	Main role, 8 episodes

=== Stage ===
Year	Title	Role	Theatre
2024	Romeo and Juliet	Paris	Duke of York's Theatre
