= Irlande Côté =

Canadian actress

- Born: April 28, 2009 (age 16); Quebec, Canada
- Occupation: Actress
- Organization: Agence Kaboom
- Awards: T.O Webfest (2021) Rio Webfest (2021)

Irlande Côté (born April 28, 2009) is a Canadian actress from Quebec.

== Biography ==
She is most noted for her performance in the film A Colony (Une colonie), for which she received a Canadian Screen Award nomination for Best Supporting Actress at the 7th Canadian Screen Awards in 2019, and a Prix Iris nomination for Revelation of the Year at the 21st Quebec Cinema Awards.

== Filmography ==
=== Television ===
- 2015 : 7$ par jour : Irlande
- 2016 : Mémoires vives : Gabriella
- 2019 : Les Ephémères : Maïka
- 2020 : Claire et les vieux : Claire
- 2020 : Portrait-robot : Romane Lever
- 2021 : Comment tu t’appelles? : Irlande
- 2021 : Plan B : Mégane
- 2022 : Les bracelets rouges : Lili
- 2022 : Avant le crash : Florence

=== Film ===
- 2013 : Louis Cyr (Louis Cyr : L'Homme le plus fort du monde) : Louis Cyr's Sister
- 2018 : A Colony (Une colonie) : Camille
- 2019 : Le Prince de Val-Bé : Jordane-Ève
- 2019 : Rebel (Recrue) : Marianne
- 2021 : Magasin général : Madeleine
- 2021 : 18 ans : Charlie
- 2021 : Boulevard 132 : Josette
- 2022 : Feu rouge : Manue
- 2022 : An Empty Seat : Nina
- 2022 : Dounia and the Princess of Aleppo (Dounia et la princesse d'Alep)
- 2024: 1+1+1 Life, Love, Chaos (1+1+1 ou La vie, l’amour, le chaos) - Flavie
