= Goodbye Girl (film) =

- Directed by: Oran Zegman
- Written by: Danielle Hoover; David Monahan
- Produced by: Mike Karz; Madison Weireter; William Bindley; Dawn Bierschwal; Ryan Lewis
- Starring: Kiernan Shipka; Cole Sprouse; Natalia Dyer; David Iacono; Megan Mullally; Alan Ruck; Zosia Mamet; Andrew Bachelor; Odeya Rush
- Cinematography: Kristen Correll
- Production company: Gulfstream Pictures
- Distributed by: Amazon MGM Studios
- Country: United States
- Language: English
- Budget: $16 million

Goodbye Girl is an upcoming American romantic comedy film directed by Oran Zegman and written by Danielle Hoover and David Monahan.

== Premise ==
A professional break-up artist is hired to dump a groom for the bride. Through this she finds herself falling in love with him.

== Cast ==
- Kiernan Shipka as Jess
- Cole Sprouse as Marcus
- Natalia Dyer as Lacy
- David Iacono as Colin Davis
- Megan Mullally as Rebecca
- Alan Ruck as Neil
- Zosia Mamet as Stella
- Andrew Bachelor as Woots
- Odeya Rush as Kirby
- Catherine Cohen as Bex
- Anthony Keyvan as Buck
- Adam Rose as Tommy
- Eli Brown as Bennett
- Luke Eisner as Todd Buzby
- Lawrence Pressman as Grandpa Mac

== Production ==
In April 2025, it was revealed that Oran Zegman would direct Goodbye Girl for Amazon MGM Studios. In February 2026, Kiernan Shipka, Cole Sprouse, Natalia Dyer, David Iacono, Megan Mullally, Alan Ruck, Zosia Mamet, and Adam Rose were among the cast set to star in the film. Eli Brown, Odeya Rush, and Luke Eisner were added a month later.

Principal photography began in New Orleans on February 2, 2026.
