= Lynn Painter =

American author

- Born: Champaign, Illinois, US
- Occupation: Novelist
- Children: 5
- Writing career
- Period: 2021–present
- Genres: Contemporary romance, young adult
- Notable works: Better Than the Movies; Mr. Wrong Number; Betting on You; Fake Skating
- Website: lynnpainter.com

Lynn Painter is an American contemporary romance author. She writes primarily for the young adult and adult demographics. She gained popularity through BookTok with her 2021 debut novel Better Than the Movies. Her novels are categorized by their resemblance to romantic comedy films. Her 2025 young adult novel Fake Skating is set to be adapted into film by Sony Pictures.

== Early life and education ==
Painter was born in Champaign, Illinois, where her father was attending Air Force weather forecaster school. Her family moved around for a few years before settling in Omaha, Nebraska, where she still lives. She attended college to train to be a teacher. Despite growing up an avid reader, she did not consider writing until her sister suggested it to her. This inspired her to return to college and attend the writer's workshop at the University of Nebraska–Lincoln.

== Career ==
Painter had written multiple books before her first published work. First among them were adult romances that included a 90,000 word novel called Beyond Texas, a book called Forgetting Tuscany, and a book with "a senator and a murder and an organized-crime-but-love type of plot." After reading Looking for Alaska, she wrote her first young adult novel. This novel did not get published either, however, it got closer to publication than any of her previous books. After this, her agent recommended that she try writing a young adult romantic comedy, which would end up being the genre of many of her published works.

Painter's published debut Better Than the Movies was released in 2021 for young adults. It surged in popularity in 2022 through BookTok. A sequel titled Nothing Like the Movies was published in 2024.

In 2022, her first published adult novel Mr. Wrong Number was released. Since then, she has published one young adult novel and at least one adult novel every year. She released a spinoff titled The Love Wager in 2023. She published her first middle grade novel The Wish Switch in 2025.

Painter was nominated for two Goodreads Choice Awards for Young Adult Fiction in 2024 for Nothing Like the Movies and Betting on You. The next year, she won an award in the same category for Fake Skating.

A film adaptation of Fake Skating developed by Sony Pictures was announced in 2026, with Will Gluck as producer.

== Personal life ==
Painter met her husband when she was 19 years old and working as a front desk clerk at a hotel. She has cited him as a source of inspiration for all of the love interests in her novels. They have five children together. Her parents divorced when she was an adult.

== Bibliography ==
=== Young adult fiction ===
==== Better Than the Movies series ====
- Better Than the Movies (2021)
- Nothing Like the Movies (2024)

==== Standalone novels ====
- The Do-Over (2022)
- Betting on You (2023)
- Fake Skating (2025)
- Trust Fall (September 2026)

=== Adult fiction ===
==== Mr. Wrong Number series ====
- Mr. Wrong Number (2022)
- The Love Wager (2023)

==== Standalone novels ====
- Accidentally Amy (2022)
- Happily Never After (2024)
- Maid for Each Other (2025)
- First and Forever (May 2026)

=== Children's fiction ===
- The Wish Switch (2025)
