= Megan Park =

Canadian actress, former singer, and creator (born 1986)

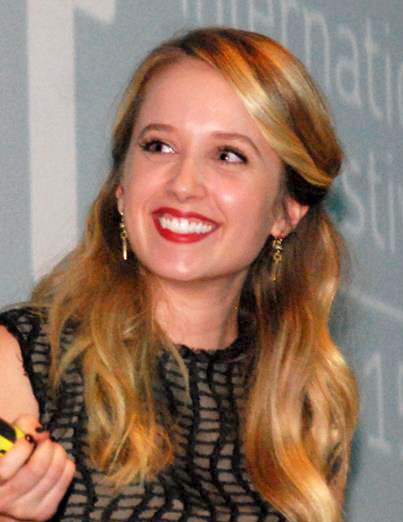
- Park at The F Word premiere in September 2013
- Born: July 24, 1986 (age 40); Lindsay, Ontario, Canada
- Occupations: Actress; director; writer; producer
- Years active: 2003–present
- Works: Full list
- Spouse: Tyler Hilton (m. 2015; div. 2026)
- Children: 2
- Awards: Full list

Megan Park (born July 24, 1986) is a Canadian actress and filmmaker. Beginning her career as an actress, she gained prominence for her roles in teen dramas before later transitioning to directing with acclaimed independent films. Her accolades include three SXSW Awards, in addition to nominations for a Directors Guild of America Award, an Independent Spirit Award and a Writers Guild of America Award.

Park began her career as an actress with roles in television films, followed by her theatrical film debut in 2007. From 2008 to 2013, she played the starring role of Grace Bowman in the ABC Family drama series The Secret Life of the American Teenager, and also had supporting roles in the films So Undercover (2012) and The F Word (2013). Beginning in the early 2010s, she gradually shifted her focus to directing, first working on music videos for artists including Billie Eilish, Blackbear and then-husband Tyler Hilton.

After directing two short films, Park made her feature-length debut with The Fallout (2021), which explores the traumas caused by a school shooting, and garnered wider recognition for the coming of age fantasy My Old Ass (2024). The latter, co-produced by Margot Robbie's LuckyChap Entertainment, and released by Amazon MGM Studios, led to her working on the Amazon Prime Video television series Sterling Point (2026–present), also with LuckyChap.

== Early life ==
Born in Lindsay, Ontario, Park began her acting career with small parts starting at age 6. She attended Oakridge Secondary School, in London, Ontario. She was also a part of the Original Kids Theatre program. Based on her origins in a small town in Canada and lack of entertainment industry connections, she originally did not think that writing and directing was an option.

== Career ==
=== Acting ===
Park's first major roles came with a guest spot on the Lifetime series Angela's Eyes and a minor role in the indie movie Charlie Bartlett. Park completed a guest starring role on the Disney Channel show Life with Derek as Amy, a love interest of Derek and head cheerleader ex-girlfriend to Max. In the ABC Family series The Secret Life of the American Teenager, she played one of the main characters, Grace Bowman, a conservative Christian teen and cheerleader who, along with her boyfriend, struggle with her purity vow until marriage.

In 2013, Park lost the role of Nicki in the sitcom Undateable to Briga Heelan. Heelan had originally been cast in the role but was believed to be unable to continue when her sitcom Ground Floor was renewed for a second season. The part was recast with Park, however when Heelan's schedule was adjusted to allow her to appear on both shows, Heelan took back the role.

In 2014, Park portrayed Jules in the horror-thriller film Demonic, directed by Will Canon. In 2015, Park portrayed Lindsay in the Hallmark Channel movie A Wish Come True, directed by Mark Rosman.

=== Music ===
In 2009, Park, Codi Caraco and Brandi Cyrus formed the band Frank + Derol, in which she sang and played bass guitar. In 2010, Park left the band to focus on her acting career.

=== Directing ===
While still acting, Park wrote a television pilot about a girl trapped inside a TV show, which was bought by a major studio but never produced. This experience helped her realize her passion for writing and directing. Her first short film, Lucy in My Eyes, screened at the 2017 Austin Film Festival. She co-wrote and co-directed the web series "We're Adults Now" with Canadian writer Katie Boland. She also directed several music videos, some of which garnered significant attention, including videos for artists Billie Eilish, Gucci Mane, Mike Posner, Alina Baraz, and Blackbear.

Park's first feature film as writer-director, The Fallout, premiered at the South by Southwest festival on March 17, 2021, where it won three awards, including the Grand Jury Prize and Audience Award. The film was released on HBO Max on January 27, 2022. Starring Jenna Ortega, it explored the psychological aftermath of a school shooting. Park described the development of the story as resulting from her experience as a Canadian living and working in the United States and observing the prevalence of gun violence, remarking: "I just couldn't stop thinking about how if I was a teenager right now, I would straight up be too scared to go to school every day. I could not do it in America."

For My Old Ass, her second feature film as writer-director, Park described herself as seeking a thematic and tonal contrast with The Fallout, wanting to "put something out into the world that was joyful, therapeutic, and left people feeling healed but in a different way." Set in the director's home region of Muskoka, the film starred Maisy Stella and Aubrey Plaza, and grew out of a feeling of nostalgia for her teenage years and the notion of being able to speak to her younger self. My Old Ass premiered at the Sundance Film Festival on January 20, 2024, was given a limited theatrical release in the United States by Amazon MGM Studios on September 13, 2024. The film was critically acclaimed, earning Park nominations for the DGA Award for First-Time Theatrical Feature Film and the WGA Award for Best Original Screenplay.

Following the success of My Old Ass, Park pitched a television series also based in the Muskoka cottage country setting, which would also examine teenage coming of age and class themes. Co-run with The O.C. and Gossip Girl creators Josh Schwartz and Stephanie Savage, Sterling Point debuted in August of 2026 on Amazon Prime Video. She cited a desire to accurately capture the experiences of the series' Generation Z protagonists, believing that The Secret Life of the American Teenager had not reflected her own teenage experience as a millennial.

Die Alive, Park's planned third film starring Zoë Kravitz, will be her first project centered around adults. She described it as being "about parenthood, aging parents, female friendship and the comedy that comes from that," adding that "[of] all the things I've written, it's the closest to where I am in my actual life."

== Personal life ==
In 2006, Park started dating American actor and singer Tyler Hilton after meeting him on the set of Charlie Bartlett. They became engaged in December 2013 and married on October 10, 2015. On December 20, 2019, they welcomed a daughter. Their second child, a son, was born in 2024. Park and Hilton ended their marriage in 2026.

== Filmography ==
=== Acting credits ===
Film
Year	Title	Role	Notes
2004	Some Things That Stay	Brenda Murphy	
2007	Kaw	Gretchen	
2007	Charlie Bartlett	Whitney Drummond	
2007	Diary of the Dead	Francine Shane	
2011	A Cinderella Story: Once Upon a Song	Beverly "Bev" Van Ravensway	Direct-to-video
2012	Guns, Girls and Gambling	Cindy, The Girl Next Door	
2012	So Undercover	Cotton Roberts	
2013	The F Word	Dalia	Also known as What If
2015	Demonic	Jules	
2015	Room	Laura	Uncredited role
2016	Central Intelligence	Lexi	
2018	Did I Kill My Mother?	Natalie Romero	
2018	Dog Days	Kelli	
2020	Deported	Harper	

Television
Year	Title	Role	Notes
2003	This Time Around	Young Cara Cabot	Television film
2004	She's Too Young	Becca White	Television film
2004	Dark Oracle	Ainsley	Episode: "It Happened at the Dance"
2004	Ace Lightning	Jessica Fisgus	Recurring role
2006	The Road to Christmas	Hilly Pullman	Television film
2006	Angela's Eyes	Zoe	Episode: "Undercover Eyes"
2007	Life with Derek	Amy	Episode: "Cheerleader Casey"
2007	The Dark Room	Zoe	Television film
2007	Kaw	Gretchen	Television film
2008–2013	The Secret Life of the American Teenager	Grace Bowman	Main role
2010	Entourage	Girl Being Interviewed	Episode: "Buzzed"
2010	The Perfect Teacher	Devon Burke	Television film
2011	Happy Endings	Chloe	Episode: "Baby Steps"
2012	The Newsroom	Gwen Valley	Episode: "News Night 2.0"
2013–2014	The Neighbors	Jane	Recurring role
2014	The Lottery	Rose	Recurring role
2015	Jane the Virgin	Dr. Damprey	Episode: "Chapter Thirty"
2015	A Wish Come True	Lindsay Corwin	Television film
2015	Ungodly Acts	Melissa Cooper	Television film
2016	My Christmas Love	Janet	Television film
2017	Imposters	Gaby	3 episodes
2017	9JKL	Sara	Episode: "Nanny Wars"
2018	Once Upon a Prince	Susanna Truitt	Hallmark Television film
2018	Time for Me to Come Home for Christmas	Cara Hill	Hallmark Television film
2019	A Christmas Wish	Maddie	Television film
2019	Young Sheldon	Francine Walker	Episode: "A Math Emergency and Perky Palms"
2021	A Royal Queens Christmas	Dee Dee	Hallmark Television film

=== Directing, writing and producing credits ===
Music videos
Year	Title	Artist
2012	"(Kissed You) Good Night"	Gloriana
2017	"Rich White Girls"	Mansionz
2017	"Watch"	Billie Eilish
2017	"do re mi"	blackbear featuring Gucci Mane
2018	"Buzzin"	Alina Baraz
2018	"I Wanna Know"	RL Grime featuring Daya
2018	"City on Fire"	Tyler Hilton

Film
Year	Title	Director	Writer	Producer	Notes
2017	Lucy in My Eyes	Yes	Yes	No	Short film
2018	A Beautiful Future: Goodnight	Yes	Yes	No	Short film
2021	The Fallout	Yes	Yes	No	
2024	My Old Ass	Yes	Yes	Executive	

Television
Year	Title	Creator	Writer	Director	Executive producer	Notes
2026	Sterling Point	Yes	Yes (3)	Yes (4)	Yes	

== Awards and nominations ==
Award	Date of ceremony	Category	Recipient(s)	Result	Ref.
Alliance of Women Film Journalists	2025	Best Woman Director	My Old Ass	Nominated	
Alliance of Women Film Journalists	2025	Best Woman Screenwriter	My Old Ass	Nominated	
Columbus Film Critics Association	2025	Best Comedy	My Old Ass	Nominated	
Critics' Choice Movie Awards	January 12, 2025	Best Comedy Film	My Old Ass	Nominated	
Directors Guild of America Awards	2025	Outstanding Directing – First-Time Feature Film	My Old Ass	Nominated	
GLAAD Media Awards	2023	Outstanding Film - Streaming Or TV	The Fallout	Nominated	
GLAAD Media Awards	2025	Outstanding Film – Wide Release	My Old Ass	Won	
Hollywood Critics Association TV Awards	2022	Best Streaming Movie	The Fallout	Nominated	
Independent Spirit Awards	2025	Best Screenplay	My Old Ass	Nominated	
Kansas City Film Critics Circle	2025	Best LGBT Film	My Old Ass	Nominated	
Las Vegas Film Critics Society	2024	Best Comedy	My Old Ass	Won	
Music City Film Critics Association	2025	Best Comedy Film	My Old Ass	Nominated	
National Board of Review	2024	Top Ten Independent Films	My Old Ass	Won	
Saturn Awards	2025	Best Fantasy Film	My Old Ass	Nominated	
South by Southwest Film Festival	2021	Narrative Feature Competition Grand Jury Award	The Fallout	Won	
South by Southwest Film Festival	2021	Brightcove Illumination Award	The Fallout	Won	
South by Southwest Film Festival	2021	Narrative Feature Competition Audience Award	The Fallout	Won	
Writers Guild of America Awards	2025	Best Original Screenplay	My Old Ass	Nominated	
