= Hailey Kilgore =

American actress and singer (born 1999)

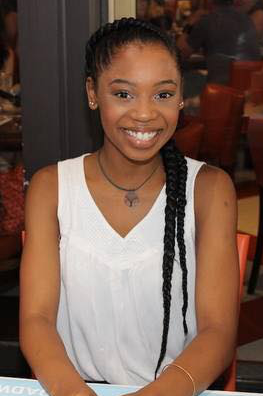
- Kilgore at Broadway Cares Flea Market, September 2017
- Born: February 16, 1999 (age 27); Humble, Texas, U.S.
- Occupations: Actor; singer
- Years active: 2015–present
- Known for: Once on This Island (2017-2019)

Hailey Frances Kilgore is an American actress and singer. Her breakthrough role was as Ti Moune in the Broadway revival of coming-of-age one-act stage musical Once on This Island, a performance for which the 19-year-old was nominated for the 2018 Tony Award for Best Actress in a Leading Role in a Musical, becoming one of the youngest nominees in the category.

== Early life and education ==
Hailey Frances Kilgore was born in Humble, Texas. She was adopted at birth by Rebecca and Eric Kilgore of Portland, Oregon. Her family moved to the Portland suburb of Happy Valley when she was still in grade school.

Kilgore began competing in pageants when she was nine. In 2012, Kilgore was named National American Miss Oregon Pre-Teen, and won the National NAM Spokesmodel competition. In 2015, she won the Miss Oregon's Outstanding Teen competition.

Kilgore attended Clackamas High School for two years, before transferring to the Clackamas Web Academy, where she graduated a year early. Kilgore performed in various productions at Clackamas High School and took part in the Portland August Wilson Monologue Competition in 2014. and 2015. In 2015, she took second place in the competition and performed in the national monologue competition at the August Wilson Theatre in New York. Kilgore was a regular "capo", or chant and song leader, for the Rose City Riveters in support of the Portland Thorns FC.

== Career ==
Kilgore made her professional theatrical debut as Rebecca Gibbs in Portland Center Stage's production of Our Town in the fall of 2015. She appeared in the Portland Center Stage production of Ain't Misbehavin' the same year.

Kilgore was a first year student at the American Musical and Dramatic Academy in New York when she was cast as Ti Moune in the Broadway revival of Once on This Island.

== Acting credits ==
=== Theatre ===
Year	Title	Role	Theatre	Director(s)	Ref.
2015	Our Town	Rebecca Gibbs	Portland Center Stage	Rose Riordan	
2015	Ain't Misbehavin'	Performer	Portland Center Stage	Chris Coleman	
2017–2019	Once on This Island	Ti Moune	Circle in the Square Theatre	Michael Arden	
2019	Into the Woods	Rapunzel	Hollywood Bowl	Robert Longbottom	
2025	Hadestown	Eurydice	Walter Kerr Theatre	Rachel Chavkin	

- Credits in bold indicate Broadway production(s)

=== Film ===
Year	Title	Role	Notes
2021	Respect	Carolyn Franklin	
2023	Cinnamon	Jodi Jackson	

=== Television ===
Year	Title	Role	Notes
2019	The Village	Olivia	3 episodes
2020	Amazing Stories	Tuka	2 episode
2021–2026	Power Book III: Raising Kanan	LaVerne "Jukebox" Thomas	Main cast
2025–present	9-1-1: Nashville	Taylor Thompson	Main cast

== Accolades ==
Year	Award	Category	Nominated Work	Result
2018	Tony Award	Best Actress in a Leading Role in a Musical	Once on This Island	Nominated
2018	Drama League Award	Distinguished Performance	Once on This Island	Nominated
2018	Outer Critics Circle Award	Outstanding Actress in a Leading Role in a Musical	Once on This Island	Nominated
2018	Theatre World Award		Once on This Island	Honoree
2018	Chita Rivera Awards for Dance and Choreography	Outstanding Female Dancer in a Broadway Show	Once on This Island	Nominated
2018	Broadway.com Audience Awards	Favorite Actress in a Leading Role in a Musical	Once on This Island	Won
2018	Broadway.com Audience Awards	Favorite Breakthrough Performance (Female)	Once on This Island	Nominated
2018	BroadwayWorld Theatre Fans' Choice Awards	Best Actress in a Leading Role in a Musical	Once on This Island	Won
2019	Grammy Award	Best Musical Theater Album	Once on This Island	Nominated

== Discography ==
Desire and Devotion

- Released: 2023
- Singles: Hold Me, Some Love Song, Three
