= The Paradox (band) =

American pop punk band

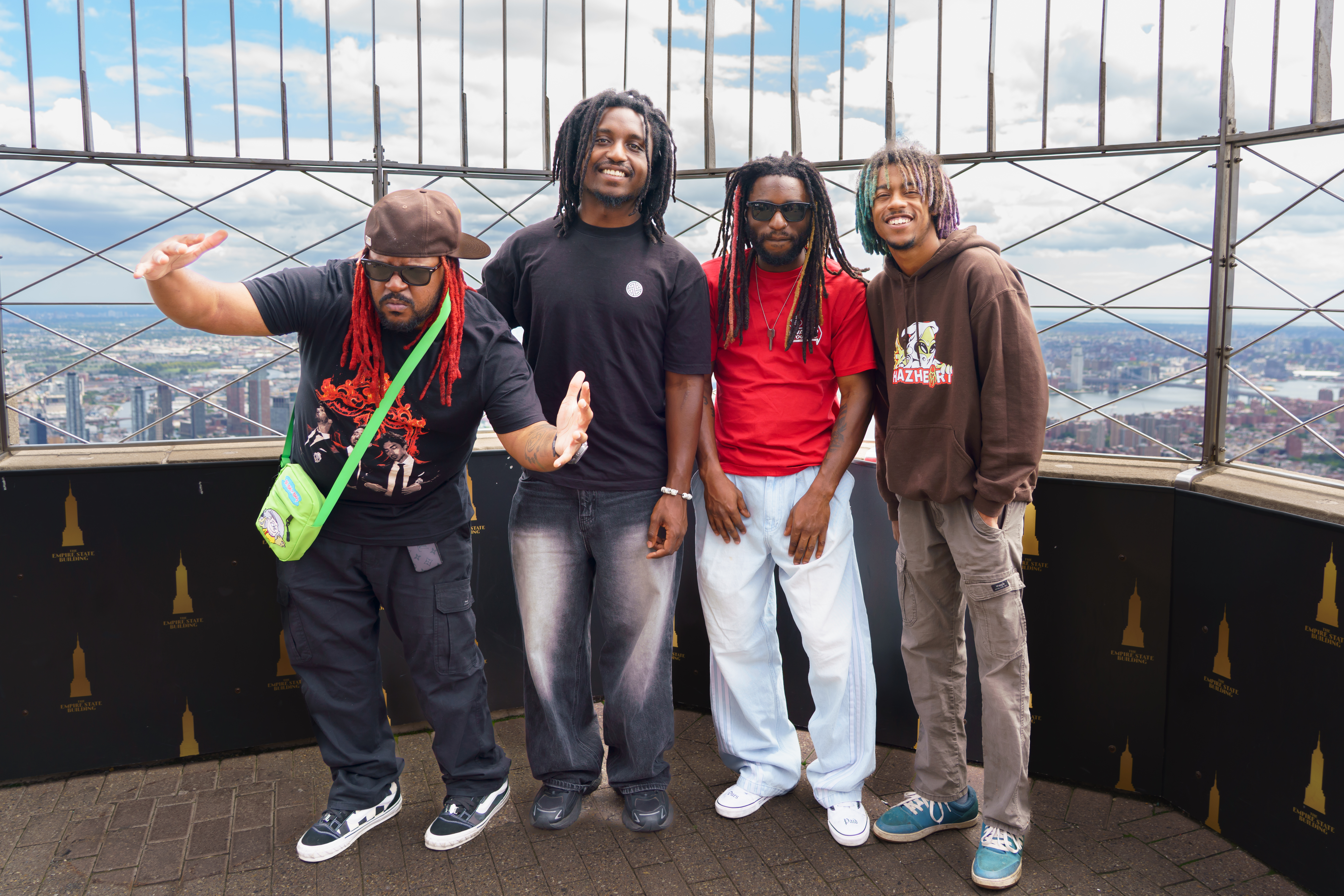
- The Paradox in 2026

Background information
- Origin: Atlanta, Georgia, US
- Genres: Punk rock; pop-punk; alternative rock; skate punk
- Years active: 2024–present
- Labels: Hundred Days; Virgin
- Members: Eric Dangerfield; Christopher "Xelan" Bernard; Donald Bryant; Percy "PC3" Crews
- Past members: Deon Lewis
- Website: theparadoxband.com

The Paradox is an American pop-punk band from Atlanta, Georgia, formed in 2024. Its members are Eric Dangerfield (lead vocals, rhythm guitar), Donald Bryant (bass), Christopher "Xelan" Bernard (lead guitar, backing vocals), and Percy "PC3" Crews (drums). They are the first all-black punk band to be number 1 on Billboard's Alternative Airplay chart.

== History ==
Eric Dangerfield had wanted to start a pop-punk band for a long time before starting The Paradox in June 2024 together with Donald Bryant and Christopher Bernard. At the time of starting the band, Dangerfield was working at an Atlanta Vape shop. They created the social-media accounts for the band in July, announcing their lineup with Deon Lewis as their drummer, who was replaced by Percy Crews within that same month. Their social media gained 110,000 followers within three weeks and over 730,000 within a month. Their career started by playing songs written by Dangerfield from his apartment and posting them on their social media, especially on Instagram.

The band's first song "Kaitlyn", released on July 3, 2024, went viral on social media. This led to the band getting invited by Billie Joe Armstrong to open for Green Day's show in Atlanta and by Jack White's show in Nashville within a month of the band's forming. While still up-and-coming, an edited video of them covering "My Own Worst Enemy" by Lit with band parody names in the comment sections gained them more popularity.

The band dropped their first single, "Imani", on August 2, 2024, kicking off their proper career. In October 2024, the band opened for the When We Were Young Festival in Las Vegas with a 25-minute set.

In April 2025, The Paradox released the single "Do Me Like That," which gained over 20 million views online. The song was originally titled "Subaru" until they received a cease and desist letter from Subaru—the band would later record a short outside a Subaru dealership of them singing the chorus of the song. It was also the first song they released on Hundred Day Records; a subsidiary of Virgin Records. On June 12th, 2025, The Paradox released their song "Get The Message", which they had debuted at PhilaMOCA. On July 18, 2025, they shared a preview of a song featuring Travis Barker. This song, "Bender", was released on the July 25th. A couple days later, The Paradox made an appearance at the Vans Warped Tour, where they brought out Barker to perform "The Rock Show" and "Bender". The band released their following single, "Do It Again", on August 29th, 2025. This single, along with their past three, appeared on their then upcoming EP "NSFW", which was released on September 19th, 2025.

The Paradox embarked on a tour opening for All Time Low and Mayday Parade in October of 2025. "Get the Message" from their first EP reached the No. 1 spot on the Alternative Airplay chart on January 24, 2026. The track features on the soundtrack of Take-Two Interactive video game NBA 2K26, and earned them a shoutout by LeBron James on his Instagram page.

On July 23, 2026, the band announced their second EP, Proceed with Caution, which was released on October 2. The EP is preceded by the two singles "Good for Me" and "I Kinda Like That".

In October 2026, The Paradox embarked on their first headline tour, "Proceed With Caution" and sold out each date.

== Musical style ==
The Paradox's music is inspired by the pop-punk resurgence, reminiscent of early 2000s bands.

Eric Dangerfield stated in an interview that his influences included Blink-182, Sum 41, Green Day, The Beatles, and New Found Glory.

== Band members ==
=== Current ===
- Eric Dangerfield – lead vocals, rhythm guitar (2024–present)
- Donald Bryant – bass guitar, occasional backing vocals (2024–present)
- Christopher "Xelan" Bernard – lead guitar, co-lead vocals (2024–present)
- Percy "PC3" Crews III – drums (2024–present)

=== Former ===
- Deon Lewis – drums (2024)

== Discography ==
=== EPs ===
- NSFW (2025)
- Proceed with Caution (2026)

=== Singles ===
List of singles, with year released and album name shown
Title	Year	Peak chart positions			Albums/EPs
Title	Year	US Alt.	US Rock Air.	CAN Modern Rock	Albums/EPs
2024	"Imani"	—	—	—	Non-album single
2024	"Ms. Lauren"	—	—	—	Non-album single
2025	"Do Me Like That"	—	—	—	NSFW
2025	"Get the Message"	1	6	—	NSFW
2025	"Bender" (feat. Travis Barker)	—	—	—	NSFW
2025	"Do It Again"	—	—	—	NSFW
2026	"Good for Me"	—	—	—	Proceed with Caution
2026	"I Kinda Like That"	6	20	36	Proceed with Caution
2026	"That's Not Fair"	—	—	—	Proceed with Caution
