= Steve Alexander (businessman) =

American businessman

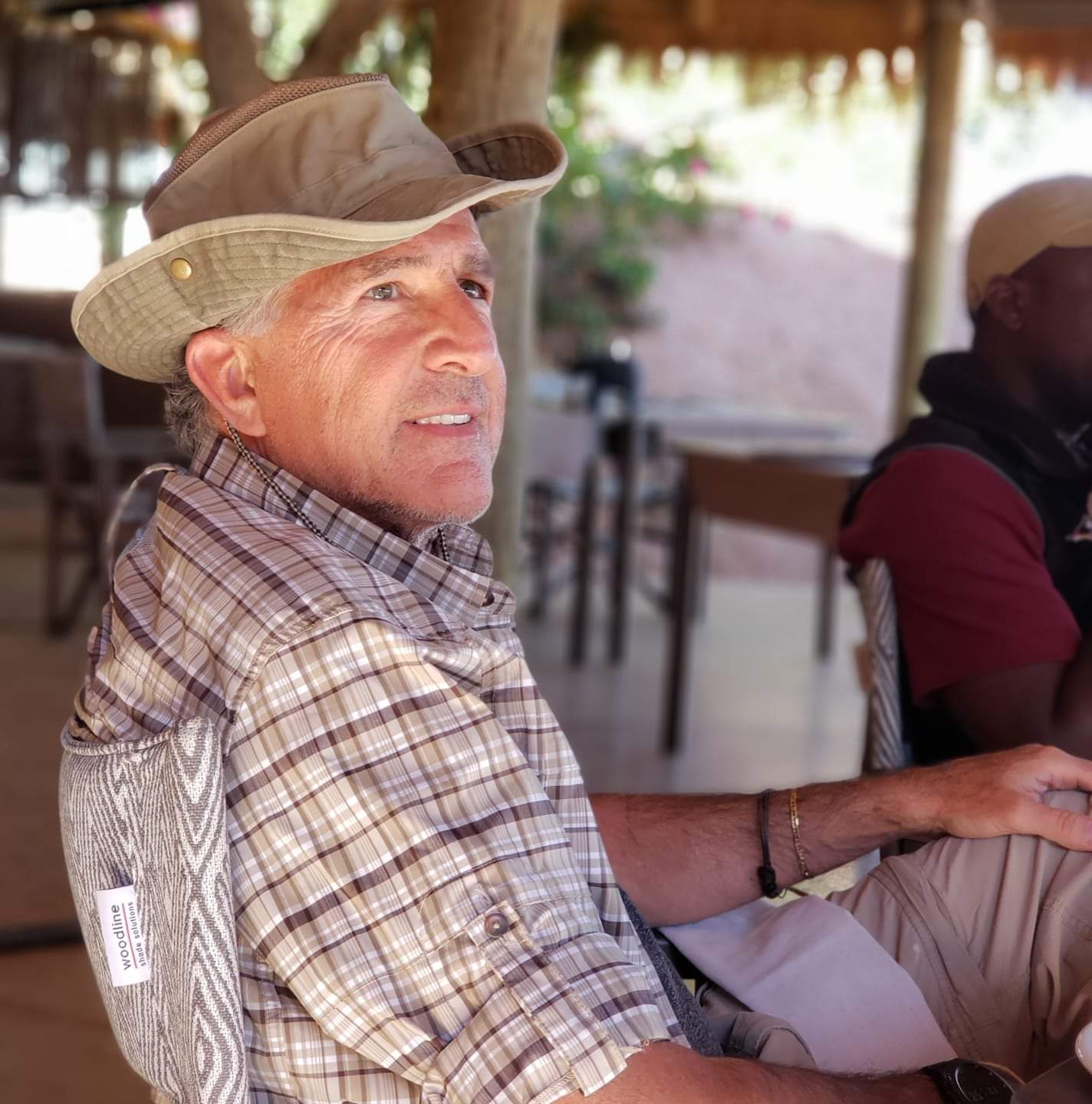
Steve Alexander in 2018

Steve Alexander (born 29 June 1951) is a professional coach and communications expert, and founder and president of his own company, The Steve Alexander Group.

== Background ==
Steve Alexander earned his bachelor's degree in Psychology and Elementary Education from Merrimack College in 1975 and a Masters in Marriage, Family and Child Clinical Services from US International University, now Alliant International University – San Diego Scripps Ranch in 1977.

He became a California licensed marriage and family therapist on January 10, 1979 and subsequently became the chief executive of the California Association of Marriage and Family Therapists in 1980, where he spearheaded major changes in consumer/patient access to marriage and family therapists through expanded health insurance coverage.

He was a graduate professor at National University in the mid-'80s, instructing courses in Government Community Relations and Influencing Government.

In 1989, he was interviewed by the Los Angeles Times about his experience attending Woodstock in 1969, in honor of the 20th anniversary of the festival. He served as the spokesperson for the PBS documentary Woodstock: Three Days That Defined a Generation released at the Bethel Woods Center for the Arts

Steve Alexander was also the Vice President of Public Affairs at Stoorza, Ziegaus and Metzger from 1994 to October 1997.

In November 1997, Alexander became the San Diego regional director for Burson-Marsteller, the largest public relations agencies in the world, before creating his own company, The Steve Alexander Group, in January 2000.

In 1988, he survived Hurricane Gilbert while vacationing in Cozumel and helped care for about 150 stranded people.

== Film Producing ==
In 2023, Steve Alexander was the executive producer of the mystery film The Secret Art of Human Flight which had its world premiere at the Tribeca Film Festival. He also played the role of the therapist.

In 2025, Steve Alexander signed on as the executive producer of the upcoming movie Nuur, a film adaptation of the novel, The Youth of God, by Somali-Canadian author Hassan Ghedi Santur, who also wrote the screenplay. Lula Ali Ismaïl is signed on to direct. In 2026, Steve Alexander, along with Idylia Hachi, formed AHA! Productions, and is now a producer on The Species, a movie starring Anthony Hopkins and Charlotte Rampling.

== Public service ==
By appointment of San Diego Mayor Roger Hedgecock, and subsequent re-appointment by Mayors Maureen O'Connor and Susan Golding, Steve Alexander served as a San Diego City Park and Recreation Commissioner and chairman of San Diego's Mission Bay Park Committee for eight years. His work resulted in the completion of the Mission Bay Park Master Plan in August 1994, resulting in an Orchid Award from the San Diego Architectural Foundation for its public outreach success.

In 1982, Governor Jerry Brown appointed Steve Alexander to the Board of Behavioral Sciences, the state agency that regulates licensed marriage and family therapists, licensed clinical social workers and licensed educational psychologists, where he also served as the board's president during his term. He was appointed to the Medical Board of California in 2001, the state agency responsible for licensing and regulating over 120,000 physicians in California, by Governor Gray Davis, and then re-appointed by Governor Arnold Schwarzenegger in 2004. Alexander was elected as the first public member Medical Board President in ten years in 2006.

In 2010, Governor Schwarzenegger appointed Alexander to the California State Athletic Commission as a California Boxing Commissioner. He was one of the five boxing commissioners that voted to deny a new license for Antonio Margarito after he was caught with plaster inserts in his gloves.

In 2025, Steve Alexander joined the board of The Museum at Bethel Woods, located on the historic site of the original Woodstock festival. The museum is part of the Bethel Woods Center for the Arts and is dedicated to preserving the memory of the Woodstock music festival.

== The Steve Alexander Group ==
Alexander is the founder and president of The Steve Alexander Group, a public affairs and facilitation firm which focuses on strategic communications, media and crisis communications and training, facilitation, coaching, team-building and training for a variety of large government agencies, non-profit organizations and businesses including the city of San Diego, The Nature Conservancy, QUALCOMM and Callaway Golf.

Steve was named one of the “50 People to Watch” in 2007 by San Diego Magazine.

Alexander's work with The Naturelands Project and National Automated Highway System Consortium earned “Pollie” awards from the American Association of Political Consultants in 1998.

As a public speaker, Steve Alexander was hosted in Chile to facilitate a communication workshop to improve the country's natural resource planning in 2003. He also keynoted New Zealand's first conference on communications and behavior change on behalf of the Ministry of the Environment in 2001.

He is a lifetime member of the International Association for Public Participation and member of the International Association of Facilitators.

In September 2010, Alexander was one of the team members that secured a $1 million National Science Foundation Grant "to develop innovative communication and education strategies to advance climate science literacy." The grant was one of 15 awarded in the United States and the only university-based award in California. In January 2012, the San Diego Regional Climate Education Partnership, which includes marine and environmental scientists from the University of San Diego and Scripps Institution of Oceanography, experts from the Energy Policy Initiatives Center at USD, social and behavioral psychologists from California State University San Marcos, community planners from The San Diego Foundation, communication experts from The San Diego Foundation and strategic experts from The Steve Alexander Group, launched its website. The Partnership continues to provide communities with up to date information about climate change.
