= Ella Rubin =

American actress (born 2001)

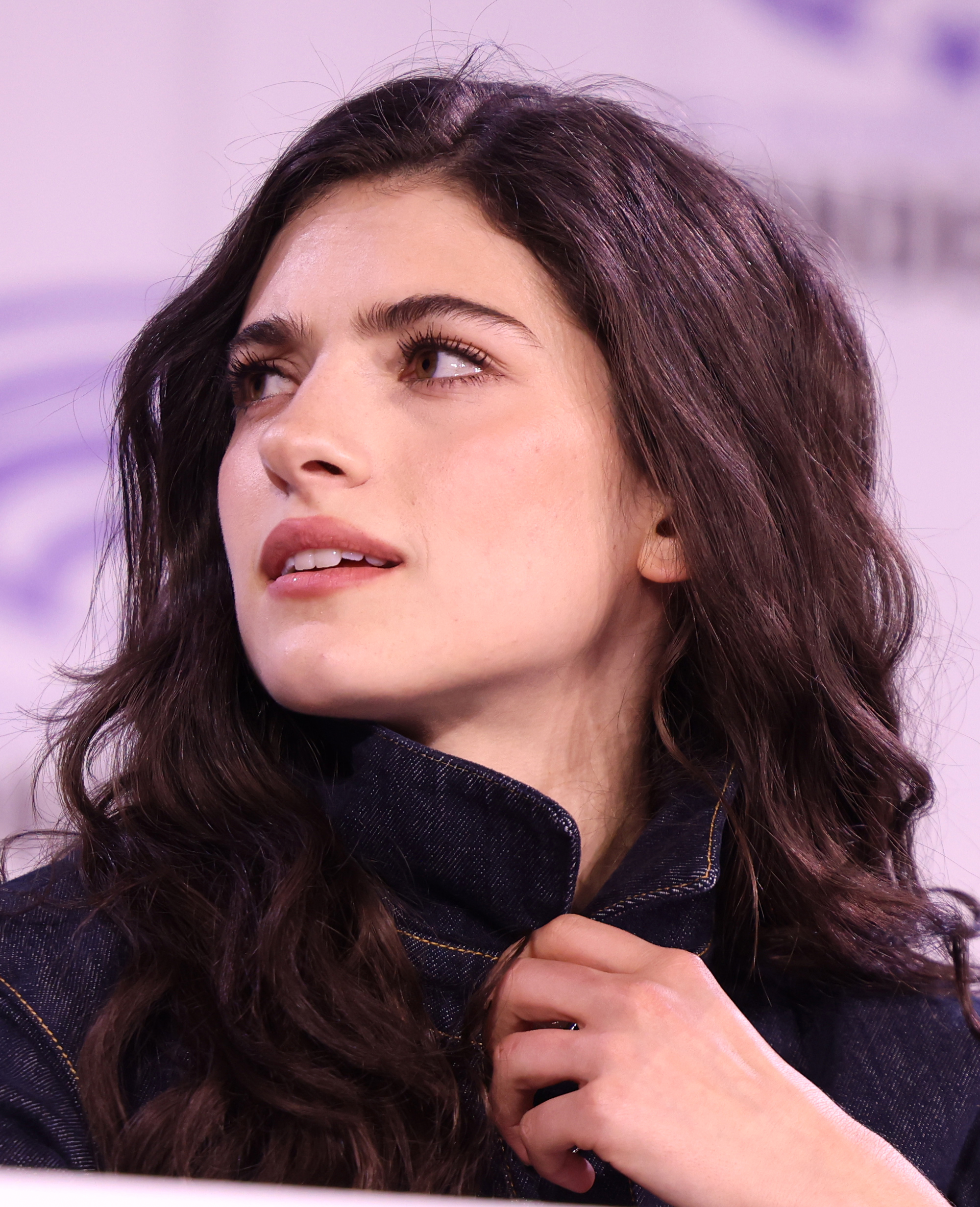
- Rubin in 2025
- Born: September 2, 2001 (age 25); New York City, U.S.
- Occupation: Actress
- Years active: 2013–present

Ella Rubin (born September 2, 2001) is an American actress. She began her career as a child actress in the film The Rewrite (2014). She made her Broadway debut in the Roundabout Theatre Company's revival of the Tennessee Williams play The Rose Tattoo (2019). On television, she is known for her roles in the Netflix series The Chair (2021) and the Hulu series The Girl from Plainville (2022).

== Early life and education ==
Rubin was born in New York City and raised on the Upper West Side of Manhattan. Her mother, Perri Kipperman, is a talent manager. Her aunt, Jodi Kipperman, is a casting director, as well as the owner and president of the talent organization, Kipperman & Company. Her father Ron Rubin served as an insurance company CEO. She is Jewish. She studied theatre and performing arts at the Professional Children's School.

== Career ==
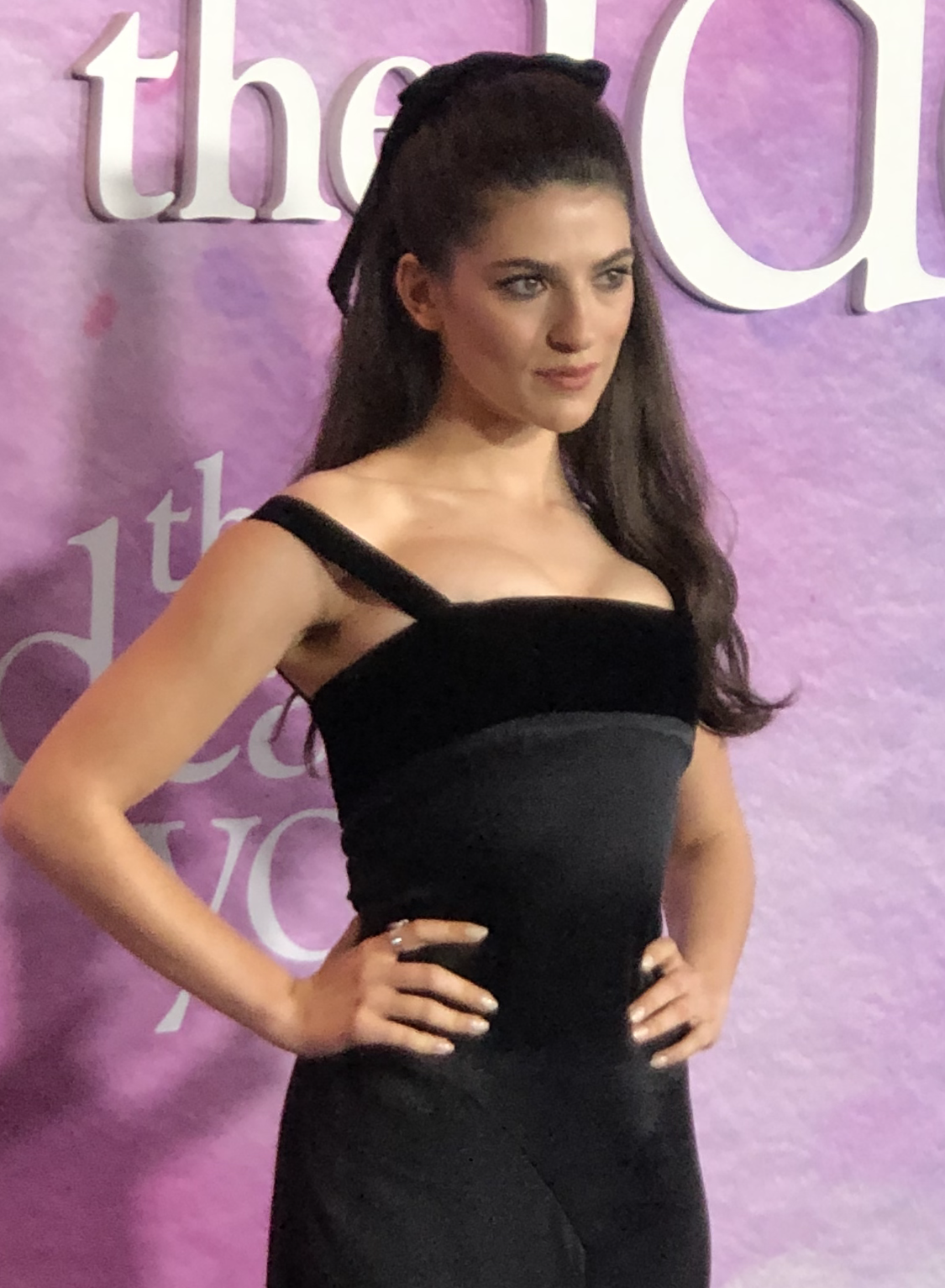
Rubin at the NYC Premiere of The Idea of You (2024)

Rubin made her film debut in a supporting role in the romantic comedy film The Rewrite (2014) starring Hugh Grant and Marisa Tomei. She has since acted in minor roles in shows such as the Hulu comedy series Difficult People (2017), the Showtime drama series Billions (2018), and the Netflix comedy series The Chair (2021). Rubin made her Broadway debut in the 2019 revival of The Rose Tattoo starring opposite Tomei.

She had a recurring role as Pippa Sykes in the HBO Max update Gossip Girl from 2021 to 2023. She played Natalie Gibson in the Hulu limited series The Girl from Plainville (2022) starring Elle Fanning. In 2023, she acted in the coming-of-age surrealist comedy The Sweet East directed by Sean Price Williams. In 2024, she had a supporting role in the Anne Hathaway-led romantic comedy The Idea of You on Prime Video and played Vera in Sean Baker's film Anora starring Mikey Madison.

In 2025, Rubin played the role of lead protagonist Clover Paul in the horror film Until Dawn. In 2026, Rubin starred as Annie Jacobson in the Amazon Prime Video young adult drama series Sterling Point, marking her first leading role in a television series.

== Acting credits ==
=== Film ===
Year	Title	Role	Ref.
2014	The Rewrite	Etta Carpenter	
2023	The Sweet East	Annabel	
2024	The Idea of You	Izzy Marchand	
2024	Anora	Vera	
2025	Until Dawn	Clover Paul	
2025	Fear Street: Prom Queen	Melissa McKendrick	
2025	Adult Children	Morgan	

=== Television ===
Year	Title	Role	Notes	Ref.
2013	Unforgettable	Lara Sonnenland	Episode: "Bigtime"	
2017	Difficult People	Shoshanna	Episode: "Fuzz Buddies"	
2018	Billions	Gilbert's daughter	Episode: "Not You, Mr. Dake."	
2021	The Chair	Dafna	Recurring role	
2021–2022	Gossip Girl	Bianca Breer	Recurring role	
2022	The Girl from Plainville	Natalie Gibson	Recurring role	
2024	Masters of the Air	Peggy	Episode: "Part One"	
2026–present	Sterling Point	Annie Jacobson	Main role	

=== Theatre ===
Year	Title	Role	Venue	Ref.
2019	The Rose Tattoo	Rosa	American Airlines Theatre, Broadway	
