= Gregg Wayans =

American actor (born 1988)

- Born: December 26, 1988 (age 37); Los Angeles, California, United States
- Occupation: Actor
- Years active: 2009–present
- Family: Wayans family

Gregory Wayans-Benson Jr. (/ˈweɪ.ənz/ WAY-ənz; born December 26, 1988) is an American actor. He is a member of the Wayans family.

== Early life ==
Wayans was born in Los Angeles, California to Diedra Wayans. He is a member of the Wayans family, which includes his uncles Keenen Ivory Wayans, Damon Wayans, Shawn Wayans, and Marlon Wayans, his aunt Kim Wayans, and his older brother Craig Wayans. He is cousins with Damien Dante Wayans, Chaunté Wayans, and Damon Wayans Jr.

== Career ==
Wayans began his career in 2009 with a small appearance in the comedy film Dance Flick, created by and starring many of his family members. He later made a brief appearance in the 2012 film We the Party.

In 2013, Wayans had a recurring role in the Cinemax series Zane's The Jump Off. That same year, he starred in the Bounce TV sitcom My Crazy Roommate. He appeared in drama film Alison's Choice in 2015. He later appeared in the 2017 paranormal suspense thriller Urban Myths. He also had brief roles in the Marlon Wayans-led films A Haunted House 2 in 2014 and Fifty Shades of Black in 2016.

In 2018, he starred in the Up TV romantic comedy film The Time Capsule, as well as the television series Polygonerz. In 2020, it was announced that Wayans would play the lead role in the Freeform comedy pilot None of the Above, which was ultimately not picked up.

Wayans starred in the Christina Milian-led thriller film Body Language, which premiered at the 2024 Screamfest Horror Film Festival. The following year, he starred in the short film It's Only Crazy..., which premiered on the streaming service The Brick TV. Wayans will appear in the upcoming horror parody film, Scary Movie, the sixth installment in the Scary Movie franchise, scheduled for release in summer 2026.

== Personal life ==
Wayans has a daughter.

Wayans volunteered for Habitat for Humanity's 2019 Hollywood Build to help build a 10-home community in Culver City, California.

== Filmography ==
=== Film ===
Year	Title	Role	Notes
2009	Dance Flick	Mr. Moody's Favorite Student	Credited as Gregory Wayans Benson Jr.
2012	We the Party	Basketball Player 3	
2014	A Haunted House 2	Police Officer	
2014	Merry Ex-Mas	Devon	Credited as Greg Wayans
2015	Alison's Choice	D'Shawn	
2016	Fifty Shades of Black	Gregg	
2017	Urban Myths	Kevin	
2018	The Time Capsule	Peter Silver	
2019	Sextuplets	Alan Double	
2024	Body Language	Nick	
2025	It's Only Crazy...	Dylon James	Short film
2026	Scary Movie	Brad Meeks	

=== Television ===
Year	Title	Role	Notes
2013	Zane's The Jump Off	Harris	Recurring role
2013	My Crazy Roomate	Sloan Simmons	Recurring role
2015	Reconcilable Differences	Terrance	Recurring role
2017–2018	Marlon	Mitchell / Andre / Shane	3 episodes
2018	Polygonerz	Harper	Main role
2019	Kidding	Tyler	Episode: "I Wonder What Grass Tastes Like"
2020	Alexa & Katie	—N/a	Stand-in
2021	The Unicorn	Carl	Episode: "Out with the Old"
2021	None of the Above	Cannon Wiggs	Television pilot
2025	Poppa's House	Interviewer	Episode: "Say Wha?!"
