= Wayans family =

American show-business family

- Place of origin: New York City, New York, U.S.
- Members: First Generation: Dwayne; Keenen; Damon; Kim; Shawn; Marlon; Diedra; Elvira; Nadia; Devonne; Second Generation: Craig; Damien; Chaunté; Damon Jr.; Gregg; Michael; Cara; Kyla; Keenen Jr.; Laila; Ilia; Mar; Shawn Howell; Axl; Third Generation: Amara; Aniya

The Wayans family (/ˈweɪənz/) is an American show-business family from New York City, New York. The family has notably influenced the genre of parody films. Members include siblings Dwayne, Keenen Ivory, Diedra, Damon Sr., Kim, Elvira, Nadia, Devonne, Shawn, and Marlon. The next generation includes Craig Wayans, Damon Wayans Jr., Damien Dante Wayans, Chaunté Wayans, and Gregg Wayans.

Television shows created by Wayans family members include In Living Color, The Wayans Bros., My Wife and Kids, Marlon, and Poppa's House. Films include the Scary Movie film series, Mo' Money, Don't Be a Menace to South Central While Drinking Your Juice in the Hood, White Chicks, and Little Man.

The Wayans are one of the most influential families in entertainment history. The family was honored with the BET Comedy Icon Award at the inaugural BET Comedy Awards in 2004. In 2025, the Wayans family was inducted into the NAACP Image Awards' Hall of Fame.

== History ==
Howell Stouten Wayans (August 26, 1936 – April 1, 2023), a supermarket manager, and his wife Elvira Alethia (née Green, July 23, 1938 – July 10, 2020), a homemaker and social worker, resided in Chelsea, New York City when they had their first child. The couple had 10 children and raised them as Jehovah's Witnesses.

== Family tree ==
- Howell Stouten Wayans (1936 – 2023), married Elvira Alethia Green (1938 – 2020)
  - Dwayne Howell Otis Wayans (born 1956), is a writer and film-score composer.
  - Keenen Ivory Desuma Wayans (born 1958), is an actor, comedian, director, and writer; married/divorced Daphne Polk
    - Jolie Ivory Imani Wayans (born 1992)
    - Keenen Ivory Wayans Jr. (born 1998)
    - Nala Yasmeen Ivory Wayans (born 1996) is a model.
    - Bella Ivory Aziza Wayans (born 2001)
    - Daphne Ivory Shiva Wayans (born 2003)
  - Diedra Wayans (born 1959) is a screenwriter. Married Gregory Benson.
    - Craig Mikel Wayans (born 1976) is a writer, producer, and actor. Two children with Jacinta Clement.
      - Sage Wayans
      - Skye Wayans
      - Harlem Lewis Wayans
      - Jordan Wayans
    - Gregg Wayans (born 1988) is an actor.
      - Khamani Wayans
  - Damon Kyle Wayans (born 1960) is a stand-up comedian, actor, writer, and producer; married/divorced Lisa Thorner.
    - Damon Kyle Wayans Jr. (born 1982) is an actor and comedian; had two children with ex Aja Metoyer and four children with wife Samara Saraiv and two grandchildren.
      - Amara Wayans (born 2003)
      - Aniya Wayans (born 2004)
      - Berlyn Wayans (born 2005)
        - Itali (born 2023)
    - Michael Wayans (born 1985). Longtime partner of Vanessa Simmons.
      - Ava Wayans (born 2014)
    - Cara Mia Wayans (born 1987)
    - Kyla Wayans (born 1981)
  - Kimberly "Kim" Nichole Wayans (born 1961) is a television and film actress; married Kevin Knotts.
  - Elvira Wayans (born 1964) is a screenwriter.
    - Damien Dante Wayans (born 1980) is an actor, screenwriter, producer and director.
    - Chaunté Wayans (born 1982) is an actress and stand-up comedian; married to Marshay Nicole.
  - Nadia Wayans (born 1965) is a former actress.
  - Devonne Wayans (born 1966) is a former screenwriter.
  - Shawn Mathis Wayans (born 1971) is an actor, comedian, writer, and producer. Had three children with ex-girlfriend Ursula Alberto.
    - Laila Wayans (born 1999) is a musician, and former member of the band Been Stellar.
    - Ilia Wayans (born 2002) is a director.
    - Marlon "Mar" Wayans (born 2004)
  - Marlon Lamont Wayans (born 1972) is an actor, comedian, writer, and producer. Had two children with ex Angela Zackery. Had one child with ex Brittany Moreland.
    - Kai Zackery Wayans (born 2000)
    - Shawn Howell Wayans (born 2002)
    - Axl July Ivory Wayans (born 2022)

== Works ==
=== Film ===
Films with the involvement of more than one member of the Wayans family:

Year	Title	Director	Writer	Producer	Starring	Close contributors
1987	Hollywood Shuffle	No	Keenen	No	Keenen, Damon, Kim	Robert Townsend, John Witherspoon, Paul Mooney, Anne-Marie Johnson, Bobby McGee, Carl Alan Craig (p/a)
1987	Eddie Murphy: Raw	No	Keenen (opening sketch)	No	Kim, Damien	Robert Townsend
1988	I'm Gonna Git You Sucka	Keenen	Keenen	No	Keenen, Damon, Kim, Shawn, Marlon, Nadia	David Alan Grier, John Witherspoon, Anne-Marie Johnson, Bobby McGee, Carl Alan Craig (p/a), Eric L. Gold (p), Tamara Rawitt (p)
1992	Mo' Money	No	Damon	Damon	Damon, Marlon	Bernie Mac, Carl Alan Craig (p), Eric L. Gold (p)
1994	Blankman	No	Damon	Damon	Damon, Michael, Damon Jr., Cara	David Alan Grier, Eric L. Gold (p)
1994	A Low Down Dirty Shame	Keenen	Keenen	No	Keenen, Kim	Eric L. Gold (p), Lee R. Mayes (p)
1995	Major Payne	No	Damon	Damon	Damon, Damien	Eric L. Gold (p)
1996	Don't Be a Menace to South Central While Drinking Your Juice in the Hood	No	Shawn, Marlon	Keenen, Shawn, Marlon	Shawn, Marlon, Keenen	Bernie Mac, Eric L. Gold (p)
2000	Scary Movie	Keenen	Shawn, Marlon	No	Shawn, Marlon, Keenen	Anna Faris, Regina Hall, Lochlyn Munro, Dave Sheridan, Jon Abrahams, Phil Beauman (w), Buddy Johnson (w), Eric L. Gold (p), Lee R. Mayes (p)
2001	Scary Movie 2	Keenen	Shawn, Marlon	Shawn, Marlon	Shawn, Marlon, Keenen	Anna Faris, Regina Hall, Chris Elliott, Alyson Fouse (w), Michael Anthony Snowden (w), Rick Alvarez (p), Eric L. Gold (p), Lee R. Mayes (p)
2004	White Chicks	Keenen	Keenen, Shawn, Marlon	Keenen, Shawn, Marlon	Shawn, Marlon	Terry Crews, Lochlyn Munro, Heather McDonald, Xavier Cook (w), Michael Anthony Snowden (w), Rick Alvarez (p), Lee R. Mayes (p)
2006	Little Man	Keenen	Keenen, Shawn, Marlon	Keenen, Shawn, Marlon	Shawn, Marlon, Damien	David Alan Grier, John Witherspoon, Lochlyn Munro, Dave Sheridan, Kelly Coffield Park, Rick Alvarez (p), Lee R. Mayes (p)
2006	Behind the Smile (unreleased)	Damon	Damon	Damon	Marlon, Damon	Terry Crews, Lochlyn Munro
2009	Dance Flick	Damien	Keenen, Shawn, Marlon, Craig, Damien	Keenen, Shawn, Marlon	Damon Jr., Shawn, Marlon, Keenen, Kim, Craig, Chaunté, Michael, Cara, Gregg	George O. Gore II, David Alan Grier, Chris Elliott, Essence Atkins, Lochlyn Munro, Heather McDonald, Phil Beauman, Rick Alvarez (p), Michael Tiddes (p)
2014	A Haunted House 2	No	Marlon	Marlon	Marlon, Gregg	Dave Sheridan, Essence Atkins, Rick Alvarez (w/p), Michael Tiddes (p/d)
2016	Fifty Shades of Black	No	Marlon	Marlon	Marlon, Chaunté, Gregg	Dave Sheridan, Rick Alvarez (w/p), Michael Tiddes (p/d)
2026	Scary Movie	No	Keenen, Shawn, Marlon	Keenen, Shawn, Marlon, Craig	Shawn, Marlon, Damon Jr., Kim, Gregg, Craig, Ilia, Mar, Shawn Howell, Axl, Keeanu	Anna Faris, Regina Hall, Chris Elliott, Lochlyn Munro, Dave Sheridan, Jon Abrahams, Rick Alvarez (w/p), Michael Tiddes (d)

=== Television ===
Television series with the involvement of more than one member of the Wayans family:

Year(s)	Title	Director(s)	Creator(s)	Writer(s)	Producer(s)	Starring	Close contributors
1990–1993	In Living Color	No	Keenen	Keenen, Damon, Kim, Marlon, Shawn	Keenen	Keenen, Damon, Kim, Marlon, Shawn	David Alan Grier, Kelly Coffield Park, Paul Mooney (w), Tamara Rawitt (p)
1995–1998	The Wayans Bros.	Marlon	Marlon, Shawn	Marlon, Shawn, Craig	Marlon, Shawn	Marlon, Shawn, Kim	John Witherspoon, Kelly Coffield Park, Essence Atkins, Bernie Mac, Phil Beauman (w/a), Buddy Johnson (w), Xavier Cook (w/p), Eric L. Gold (p)
1996–1997	Waynehead	No	Damon	Damon	Damon	Marlon, Shawn, Kim	David Alan Grier, John Witherspoon, Eric L. Gold (p)
1997–1998	413 Hope St.	No	Damon	Damon	Damon	Damien	Kelly Coffield Park
2001–2005	My Wife and Kids	Damien, Kim, Craig	Damon	Damon, Kim, Craig, Damien, Damon Jr., Elvira	Damon, Craig, Kim, Damien	Damon, Damon Jr., Michael, Cara, Kyla, Keenen	George O. Gore II, David Alan Grier, Terry Crews, Kelly Coffield Park, Buddy Johnson (w/a/p), Alyson Fouse (w), Eric L. Gold (p)
2006	The Underground	Damon, Damien	Damon	Damon, Damien, Damon Jr.	Damon, Damien	Damon, Damon Jr.	
2011–2013	Happy Endings	No	No	No	No	Damon, Damon Jr.	David Alan Grier
2013	Second Generation Wayans	No	Damien, Craig	Damien, Craig	Marlon, Damien, Craig	Damien, Craig, Marlon, Damon Jr.	George O. Gore II (w/a), Regina Hall, Terry Crews, Jon Abrahams, Alyson Fouse (w/p), Xavier Cook (w), Rick Alvarez (p)
2014	Funniest Wins	No	Craig	No	No	Marlon, Damon Jr.	Rick Alvarez (p)
2017–2018	Marlon	No	Marlon	Marlon, Craig	Marlon, Craig	Marlon, Gregg, Kim	Essence Atkins
2020	Happy Together	No	No	Craig	Craig	Damon, Damon Jr.	
2020	The Last O.G.	No	No	Keenen	Keenen, Craig	No	
2023–present	Raid the Cage	No	No	No	Damon Jr., Michael	Damon Jr.	
2024–2025	Poppa's House	Kim, Damien	Damon	Damon, Kim, Shawn, Michael, Cara, Kyla, Amara, Aniya, Keenen Jr.	Damon, Damon Jr., Kim, Shawn	Damon, Damon Jr., Marlon, Amara, Gregg, Michael, Kim	Essence Atkins, Phil Beauman (w/a/p)

=== Specials ===
Television/streaming specials with the involvement of more than one member of the Wayans family:

Year(s)	Title	Director(s)	Creator(s)	Writer(s)	Producer(s)	Starring	Close contributors
1987	Robert Townsend and His Partners in Crime	No	N/A	Keenen	No	Keenen, Damon, Kim	John Witherspoon, Anne-Marie Johnson, Paul Mooney, Carl Alan Craig (p/a), Bobby McGee
1988	Take No Prisoners: Robert Townsend and His Partners in Crime II	No	N/A	Keenen	No	Damon, Kim, Shawn, Marlon	David Alan Grier, John Witherspoon, Paul Mooney, Carl Alan Craig (p)
1989	One Night Stand - "Damon Wayans"	No	No	Damon	No	Damon, Damon Jr., Michael	Carl Alan Craig (p)
1989	The Mutiny Has Just Begun: Robert Townsend and His Partners in Crime III	No	N/A	No	No	Damon, Marlon	David Alan Grier, Anne-Marie Johnson, Bobby McGee, John Witherspoon, Carl Alan Craig (p/a)
1989	Playing the Nutroll: Robert Townsend and His Partners in Crime IV	No	N/A	No	No	Damon, Shawn	John Witherspoon, Carl Alan Craig (p)
1993	Soul Train Comedy Awards	No	No	Keenen, Damon, Kim, Marlon, Shawn	No	Keenen, Damon, Kim, Marlon, Shawn	David Alan Grier, John Witherspoon
1998	Comics Come Home 4	No	No	Marlon, Shawn	No	Marlon, Shawn	
2000	2000 MTV Video Music Awards	No	No	Marlon, Shawn, Craig	No	Marlon, Shawn	Phil Beauman (w), Buddy Johnson (w), Alyson Fouse (w)
2004	BET Comedy Awards	No	No	No	No	Keenen, Damon, Marlon, Elvira Green Wayans	David Alan Grier, Xavier Cook (w), Michael Anthony Snowden (w)
2006	BET Awards 2006	No	No	Damon Jr.	No	Damon, Keenen, Shawn, Marlon	Michael Anthony Snowden (w)
2006	Thugaboo: Sneaker Madness	Shawn	Keenen	Keenen, Marlon, Shawn	Keenen, Marlon, Shawn	Kim, Shawn	George O. Gore II, David Alan Grier, Heather McDonald, Michael Anthony Snowden (w)
2006	A Boo Crew Christmas: A Miracle on D-Roc's Street	Shawn	Keenen, Marlon, Shawn	Keenen, Marlon, Shawn	Keenen, Marlon, Shawn	Kim, Marlon, Shawn, Craig	George O. Gore II, David Alan Grier, John Witherspoon, Lochlyn Munro, Jon Abrahams, Heather McDonald, Buddy Johnson (w/a), Michael Anthony Snowden (w)
2022	Marlon Wayans Presents: The Headliners	No	N/A	Marlon, Chaunté	Marlon	Marlon, Chaunté	
2024	Marlon Wayans: Good Grief	No	N/A	Marlon	Marlon, Craig	Marlon	Rick Alvarez (p)
2025	56th NAACP Image Awards	No	No	No	No	Damon, Kim, Marlon, Damon Jr., Craig, Damien, Chaunté	David Alan Grier

== Solo projects ==
These are movies, TV shows, and TV specials starring a member of the Wayans family in a prominent role that do not feature major involvement from other members of the Wayans family:

- Keenen Ivory Wayans
  - A Low Down Dirty Shame (1994, also writer/director)
  - The Glimmer Man (1996)
  - Most Wanted (1997, also writer/producer)
  - The Keenen Ivory Wayans Show (1997–1998, also writer/producer)
- Damon Wayans
  - Earth Girls Are Easy (1988)
  - Damon Wayans: The Last Stand (1991, also writer/producer)
  - The Last Boy Scout (1991)
  - Mo' Money (1992, also writer/producer)
  - Blankman (1994, also writer/producer)
  - Major Payne (1995, also writer/producer)
  - Celtic Pride (1996)
  - The Great White Hype (1996)
  - Bulletproof (1996)
  - Damon Wayans: Still Standing (1997, also writer/producer)
  - Damon (1998, also co-creator/writer/producer)
  - Harlem Aria (1999, also producer)
  - Bamboozled (2000)
  - Marci X (2003)
  - Premium Blend (2005)
  - Damon Wayans: Way Out (2008, also writer/producer)
  - Lethal Weapon (2016–2019)
- Kim Wayans
  - In the House (1995–1998)
  - Juwanna Mann (2002)
  - Reckless (2014)
  - Pariah (2011)
- Marlon Wayans
  - Above the Rim (1994)
  - The Sixth Man (1997)
  - Senseless (1998)
  - Requiem for a Dream (2000)
  - Dungeons & Dragons (2000)
  - A Haunted House (2013, also writer/producer)
  - A Haunted House 2 (2014, also writer/producer)
  - I Can Do That (2015, also producer)
  - Fifty Shades of Black (2016, also writer/producer)
  - Naked (2017, also writer/producer)
  - Marlon Wayans: Woke-ish (2018, also writer/producer)
  - Sextuplets (2019, also writer/producer)
  - Marlon Wayans: You Know What It Is (2021, also writer/producer)
  - The Curse of Bridge Hollow (2022, also producer)
  - Marlon Wayans: God Loves Me (2023, also writer/producer)
  - Him (2025)
- Damon Wayans Jr.
  - New Girl (2011, 2013–2015, 2016, 2018)
  - Let's Be Cops (2014)
  - Someone Marry Barry (2014)

== Production companies ==
Some production incarnations/vanity cards include:

- Ivory Way Productions, a production company by Keenen.
- Wife 'N Kids Productions, a production company by Damon.
- Nu Systems Productions, a production company by Damon.
- BabyWay Productions, a production company by Marlon.
- Next to Last Productions, a production company by Shawn.
- Wayans Bros. Entertainment, a joint production between Keenen, Shawn, and Marlon.
- Amara Production Films, a production company by Damon.
- Second Generations Productions, a production company by Damien Dante.
- Wayans Alvarez Productions, a joint production between Marlon and Rick Alvarez.
- Two Shakes Entertainment, a production company by Damon Jr.
- Ugly Baby Productions, a production company by Marlon.
