= Craig Wayans =

American writer, television producer, and actor (born 1976)

- Born: Craig Mikel Wayans; March 27, 1976 (age 50); New York City, New York, United States
- Occupations: Writer, producer, actor
- Years active: 1996–present
- Family: Wayans family

Craig Mikel Wayans (/ˈweɪ.ənz/ WAY-ənz; born March 27, 1976) is an American writer, producer, and actor. He is the nephew of Keenen Ivory Wayans, Damon Wayans, Kim Wayans, Shawn Wayans, and Marlon Wayans.

== Early life ==
Craig was born in New York City, New York to Diedra Wayans, sister to Keenen Ivory Wayans, Damon Wayans, Kim Wayans, Shawn Wayans and Marlon Wayans. His younger brother is Gregg Wayans, and he is cousins with Damien Dante Wayans, Chaunté Wayans, and Damon Wayans Jr.

== Career ==
Wayans worked as production assistant on his uncle Damon's 1995 film, Major Payne. He appeared in bit parts in Don't Be a Menace to South Central While Drinking Your Juice in the Hood in 1996 and The 6th Man in 1997. He is credited as a writer for Scary Movie 2, released in 2001. He appeared in the children's animated special A Boo Crew Christmas: A Miracle on D-Roc Street in 2006. In 2009, he wrote, produced, and starred in the comedy film Dance Flick.

He was a regular writer and producer on Damon Wayans' TV sitcom My Wife and Kids. In 2013, Wayans co-created and co-starred in the 2013 BET TV show Second Generation Wayans with his cousin, Damien Dante Wayans.

Wayans served as the executive producer for the comedy special Marlon Wayans: Good Grief, released in 2024. He co-wrote the upcoming parody film Scary Movie, the sixth installment in the Scary Movie franchise, set to be released in June 2026.

== Filmography ==
=== Film ===
Year	Title	Writer	Producer	Other	Notes
1995	Major Payne	No	No	Yes	Production assistant
2001	Scary Movie 2	Yes	No	No	
2009	Dance Flick	Yes	Executive	Yes	Also actor
2024	Marlon Wayans: Good Grief	No	Executive	No	
2026	Scary Movie	Yes	Yes	Yes	Also actor

Acting roles

Year	Title	Role	Notes
1996	Don't Be a Menace to South Central While Drinking Your Juice in the Hood	Thug #1	
1997	The 6th Man	Husky Player	
2009	Dance Flick	Truck	Also executive producer, writer
2024	A Hip Hop Story	Mc Slammer	
2026	Scary Movie	Shorty's Friend	Also co-writer, co-producer

=== Television ===
Year	Title	Director	Writer	Producer	Other	Notes
1998–1999	The Wayans Bros.	No	Yes	No	No	3 episodes
2000	2000 MTV Video Music Awards	No	No	No	Yes	Consultant
2001–2005	My Wife and Kids	Yes	Yes	Yes	Yes	Also executive story editor
2010	BET Awards 2010	No	Yes	No	No	
2013	Second Generation Wayans	No	Yes	Executive	Yes	Also creator, actor
2014	Funniest Wins	No	No	Development	No	
2017–2018	Marlon	No	Yes	Consulting	No	
2018	Happy Together	No	Yes	Consulting	No	2 episodes
2020	The Last O.G.	No	No	Supervising	No	10 episodes
2021	Bigger	No	Yes	No	No	Episode: "Grown Man Shit"

Acting roles

Year	Title	Role	Notes
2006	A Boo Crew Christmas: A Miracle on D-Roc Street	Freddie Stickler	Voice role
2013	Second Generation Wayans	Craig Wayans	Also creator, producer, writer

== Awards and nominations ==
Award	Year	Category	Nominated work	Result	Ref.
BET Comedy Awards	2005	Outstanding Directing for a Comedy Series (Note: Shared with the directors.)	My Wife and Kids	Nominated	
BET Comedy Awards	2005	Outstanding Writing for a Comedy Series (Note: Shared with the writers.)	My Wife and Kids	Nominated	
