= Damien Dante Wayans =

American actor (born 1980)

- Born: Damien Dante Wayans; April 15, 1980 (age 46); New York City, U.S.
- Occupations: Actor, screenwriter, producer, director
- Years active: 1987–present
- Family: Wayans family

Damien Dante Wayans (/ˈweɪ.ənz/ WAY-ənz; born April 15, 1980) is an American actor, screenwriter, producer and director. He is a member of the Wayans family.

== Early life ==
Wayans was born in New York City. He is a member of the Wayans family, which includes Keenen Ivory Wayans, Damon Wayans Sr., Kim Wayans, Shawn Wayans, and Marlon Wayans. He is the son of their sibling Elvira Wayans and brother of Chaunté Wayans. Damon Wayans Jr. and Craig Wayans are his cousins.

== Career ==
Wayans began his career in 1987 in Eddie Murphy's standup comedy film Eddie Murphy Raw. He acted with his uncle Damon Wayans in Major Payne. He then went on to writing and directing. His big break in acting was in Jamie Kennedy's film Malibu's Most Wanted, in which he played Tec, Shondra's (Regina Hall) ex-boyfriend. Wayans has written and directed several episodes of his uncle Damon's sitcom My Wife and Kids.

In 2006, he appeared in the direct-to-DVD comedy film Man About Town. That same year, Wayans and his cousin Craig Wayans wrote and produced their uncle Damon's The Underground, a sketch comedy show on Showtime. Wayans also directed a few segments.

He made his directorial debut with the 2009 film Dance Flick, which he also co-wrote alongside Keenen Ivory Wayans, Shawn Wayans, Marlon Wayans and Craig Wayans. He formed a film and TV production company called Second Generation Productions, a reference to the second generation of Wayans in the entertainment industry. He plans to create, develop and produce multiplatform content.

In 2012, he appeared in George Watsky's WatchLoud web series Watsky's Making An Album. The following year, Wayans and his cousin Craig Wayans created, wrote, and starred in the BET comedy drama Second Generation Wayans. He joined the cast of Single Ladies in 2014 in a recurring role as David Berenger.

In 2017, he appeared as a guest on the VH1 game show Hip Hop Squares. He also appeared in the MTV in comedy game show SafeWord. In 2025, he directed an episode of the CBS sitcom Poppa's House.

== Personal life ==
In 2015, Wayans began leasing his house in the Hollywood Hills neighborhood of California.

== Filmography ==
=== Short film ===
Year	Title	Director	Writer	Producer
2004	The Last Meal	Yes	Yes	Yes
2023	Stand Up	No	No	Executive

=== Feature film ===
Year	Title	Director	Writer	Producer
2009	Dance Flick	Yes	Yes	Executive

=== Acting roles ===
Year	Title	Role	Notes
1987	Eddie Murphy Raw	Child Running in House (Sketch)	
1995	Major Payne	Cadet Dwight "D." Williams	
1996	Don't Be a Menace to South Central While Drinking Your Juice in the Hood	Cousin with Bag	
1999	Passing Glory	Snow Lurcher	TV movie
2000	Freedom Song	Bo Drew	TV movie
2003	Malibu's Most Wanted	Tec	
2005	Edison	Isaiah Charles	
2006	Man About Town	Lucky Reynolds	
2006	Little Man	Officer Wilson	
2012	Internet Icon	Multiple Roles (Guest Actor for contestants)	
2023	Stand Up	Deondre	Short film
2024	A Hip Hop Story	Donny	

=== Television ===
Year	Title	Director	Writer	Producer	Notes
2002–2005	My Wife and Kids	Yes	Yes	Yes	Director: 19 episodes, writer: 35 episodes, producer: 26 episodes
2006	The Underground	Yes	Yes	Yes	Director: 2 episodes, writer, producer: 10 episodes
2013	Second Generation Wayans	No	Yes	Executive	Also creator
2025	Poppa's House	Yes	No	No	Episode: "Say Wha?!"

=== Acting roles ===
Year	Title	Role	Notes
1991	In Living Color	Himself	Uncredited
1996	New York Undercover	Tulane	Episode: "Toy Soldiers"
1997	413 Hope St.	Greg Barnes	Episodes: "Pilot", "Heartbeat"
1999	The Norm Show	Shawn	Episode: "Norm vs. the Boxer"
2000	NYPD Blue	Trey	Episode: "Brothers Under Arms"
2006	House M.D.	Haller	Episode: "Que Será Será"
2012	Let's Stay Together	Daniel	Episode: "Let's Do It Again"
2013	Second Generation Wayans	Damien Dante Wayans	Main role
2014	Single Ladies	David Berenger	Recurring role
2014	Mind of a Man	Himself	Panelist
2017	Hip Hop Squares	Himself	Panelist
2017	Safeword	Himself	

=== Web series ===
Year	Title	Role	Notes
2012	Internet Icon	Himself	Guest actor
2012	Watsky's Making an Album	Ricky Slim Jr.	

== Accolades ==
Award	Year	Category	Nominated work	Result	Ref.
BET Comedy Awards	2005	Outstanding Directing for a Comedy Series (Note: Shared with the directors.)	My Wife and Kids	Nominated	
BET Comedy Awards	2005	Outstanding Writing for a Comedy Series (Note: Shared with the writers.)	My Wife and Kids	Nominated	
