= Little Man (2006 film) =

2006 American film

- Theatrical release poster
- Directed by: Keenen Ivory Wayans
- Written by: Keenen Ivory Wayans; Shawn Wayans; Marlon Wayans
- Produced by: Keenen Ivory Wayans; Marlon Wayans; Shawn Wayans; Rick Alvarez; Lee R. Mayes
- Starring: Marlon Wayans; Shawn Wayans
- Cinematography: Steven Bernstein
- Edited by: Nick Moore; Mike Jackson
- Music by: Teddy Castellucci
- Production companies: Revolution Studios; Wayans Bros. Entertainment
- Distributed by: Columbia Pictures (through Sony Pictures Releasing)
- Release date: July 14, 2006
- Running time: 98 minutes
- Country: United States
- Language: English
- Budget: $64 million
- Box office: $105 million

Little Man is a 2006 American crime comedy film directed by Keenen Ivory Wayans, who co-wrote and co-produced it with Marlon and Shawn Wayans, who both also star in lead roles. The film co-stars Kerry Washington, John Witherspoon, Tracy Morgan, Lochlyn Munro, Chazz Palminteri and Molly Shannon. It follows a jewel thief with dwarfism who hides the proceeds of his latest robbery, then pretends to be a very large baby in order to retrieve it.

Theatrically released in the United States on July 14, 2006 by Sony Pictures Releasing, the film was a commercial success, but was critically panned and won three Golden Raspberry Awards.

== Plot ==
In Chicago, Calvin "Babyface" Simms is a dwarfish convicted jewel thief who gets released from prison and meets up with his dim-witted cohort Percy. Percy tells Calvin of a job involving stealing a valuable diamond, ordered by a mobster named Mr. Walken. After the successful robbery, the duo are almost arrested by the police, but not before Calvin manages to stash the diamond in the purse of a nearby woman. Both Calvin and Percy follow the handbag's owner to her home where they discover a couple, Darryl and Vanessa Edwards, the former of whom is eager to have a child.

Calvin and Percy hatch a plot to pass Calvin off as a baby left on the couple's doorstep in order to get the diamond back. After learning that Child Services is closed for the weekend, Darryl and Vanessa decide to look after Calvin in the meantime. However, Vanessa's dad Francis, "Pops", has a bad feeling about Calvin. Friends of the couple find Calvin strange as well. Despite this, Calvin eventually takes a liking to having a family and starts to feel remorse for using them, especially when they throw him a birthday party (coincidentally on his actual birthday) as he never had parents who'd throw him a party. Walken grows impatient and demands the diamond from Percy, who attempts to recover Calvin by posing as his father, but is thrown out by Darryl. Walken's men, Bruno and Rosco, witness this altercation and as a result believe that Darryl is Calvin.

Darryl and Vanessa decide to adopt Calvin but upon coming home from a date they had after they found the diamond in Calvin's diaper since Calvin gulped castor oil in order to get explosive diarrhea following him swallowing the diamond, they find Pops and Calvin getting into a clash as the former has discovered Calvin's secret. Pops is sent to a retirement home, but not before he tells Darryl to "check the teddy bear", referring to a gift he gave to Calvin earlier at his party. Darryl discovers the bear is actually a nanny cam and witnesses Calvin admit to his deception. Walken and his henchmen come by the house after Percy lies to get out of trouble, claiming that Darryl is his partner who has the diamond. In a series of comedic maneuvers, Calvin manages to rescue Darryl and have Walken and his men arrested. Darryl is given a substantial reward for the recovery of the diamond, and since Calvin saved his life, he doesn't turn him over to the police.

Before he leaves, Calvin thanks Darryl for taking care of him even though he wasn't really a baby and admits that he thinks Darryl would make a great father for a real child someday. As Calvin walks away, he begins to cry hysterically knowing he will miss the family very much. Darryl then decides to let Calvin stay and the two men become the best of friends. The film ends at some point in the future with Calvin and Pops playing with Darryl and Vanessa's real baby, who looks exactly like Darryl.

== Cast ==
- Marlon Wayans as Calvin "Babyface" Simms, a dwarf criminal who poses as a baby in order to retrieve a diamond
- Shawn Wayans as Darryl Edwards, a wannabe father who mistakes Calvin for his adopted child
- Kerry Washington as Vanessa Edwards, Darryl's wife
- John Witherspoon as Francis "Grandpa Pops" Edwards, Vanessa's father from Detroit who is suspicious of Calvin at the start
- Tracy Morgan as Percy "P Unit" Pryor, Calvin's dimwitted cohort
- Lochlyn Munro as Greg Ault, Darryl's friend who likes to toughen up kids instead of loving them
- Fred Stoller as Richard Sellens, Darryl's other friend who would rather deal with overprotecting kids
- Alex Borstein as Janet Sellens
- Brittany Daniel as Brittany Ault, Greg's wife who Calvin finds attractive
- Chazz Palminteri as Mr. Walken, a crime boss
- Molly Shannon as Soccer Mom
- David Alan Grier as Jimmy Murphy
- Dave Sheridan as Rosco Key, one of Walken's henchmen
- Linden Porco as Calvin Body
- Gabriel Pimentel as Calvin Body
- John DeSantis as Bruno (credited as John De Santis), one of Walken's henchmen
- Kelly Coffield Park as The Jeweler
- Damien Dante Wayans as Officer Wilson
- Gary Owen as Officer Jankowski
- Rob Schneider as "D-Rex" (uncredited cameo)
- Reece Knight as Nicholas
- Chloe Matthews as Chrissy
- Matthew Ast as Tommy

== Production ==
The story premise was lifted from a 1954 Bugs Bunny cartoon called Baby Buggy Bunny, in which Bugs takes in a foundling unaware that he is actually a wanted dwarf bank robber.

Filming began in the Vancouver area on September 17, 2005, and finished on January 21, 2006.

The scenes with Calvin Simms were played twice: once by nine year old 75 cm (2 ft 6 in) tall dwarf actor Linden Porco together with the other actors, and once by Marlon Wayans alone, using a greenscreen technique with a green background and green clothes. In post production, Porco's head on the images was replaced by that of Marlon. Porco's body was painted brown in order to match Marlon's face. Shawn Wayans' face was also superimposed in the final scene.

The film was brought up during R. Kelly's 2008 sexual abuse trial. Upon testifying that she had recognized a victim of sex trafficking video by her face and hair, Kelly's defense lawyer inquired if she had seen a 'Waymon Brothers' film called Little Man. "They took the head of Marlon Waymons and put it on a midget, and it looked real, didn't it?" His defense lawyers would later make multiple arguments querying the veracity of any footage.

== Soundtrack ==
- "My House" by Lloyd Banks and 50 Cent
- "Ridin'" by Chamillionaire and Krayzie Bone
- "The Message" by Echo & the Bunnymen
- "Movin' on Up" by Jeff Berry and Ja'net Dubois
- "Celebration" by Robert Kool Bell
- "Lifetime" by Maxwell
- "Purple Haze" by Maxwell
- "Buddy (D-Rex Theme Song)" by Dwayne Wayans and Eric Willis
- "Best Friend" by Harry Nilsson
- "Pump It" by The Black Eyed Peas
- "Happy Birthday to You" by Mildred J. Hill and Patty S. Hill
- "Praise You" by Fatboy Slim
- "Candy Shop" (instrumental) by 50 Cent and Olivia

== Reception ==
=== Box office ===
Little Man film grossed $58,645,052 domestically and a total of $101,595,121 worldwide. The film's budget was $64 million. The film was released in the United Kingdom on September 1, 2006, and opened on #2, behind You, Me and Dupree. According to Sony, the audience was 53% female and 59% under the age of twenty-five.

=== Critical response ===
On Rotten Tomatoes, the film has an approval rating of 12% based on reviews from 90 critics. The site's consensus is "Another gimmicky comedy from the Wayans brothers, Little Man comes with the requisite raunchiness, but forgot to bring the laughs." On Metacritic, it has a score of 26 out 100 based on reviews from 22 critics, indicating "generally unfavorable" reviews. Audiences surveyed by CinemaScore gave the film a grade B+ on a scale of A to F.

The film received a 4.2 out of 10 on Common Sense Media. Slant Magazine gave the film a 1.5 out of 4.

In an especially scathing review on BBC Radio 5 Live, Mark Kermode described the film as "possessed by the devil".

=== Awards ===
The film was nominated for seven 2006 Golden Raspberry Awards: Worst Picture, Worst Actor (Marlon Wayans and Shawn Wayans), Worst Actor (Rob Schneider, also nominated for his performance in The Benchwarmers), Worst Director (Keenen Ivory Wayans), Worst Screen Couple (Shawn Wayans and either Kerry Washington or Marlon Wayans), Worst Screenplay and Worst Remake or Rip-off (of the 1954 Bugs Bunny cartoon Baby Buggy Bunny). It later won three of the awards, Worst Actor, Worst Screen Couple and Worst Remake or Rip-off.

Award	Category	Subject	Result
Golden Raspberry Award	Worst Picture		Nominated
Golden Raspberry Award	Worst Director	Keenen Ivory Wayans	Nominated
Golden Raspberry Award	Worst Screenplay	Keenen Ivory Wayans	Nominated
Golden Raspberry Award	Worst Screenplay	Marlon Wayans and Shawn Wayans	Nominated
Golden Raspberry Award	Worst Actor	Marlon Wayans and Shawn Wayans	Won
Golden Raspberry Award	Worst Screen Couple	Marlon Wayans and Shawn Wayans	Won
Golden Raspberry Award	Worst Screen Couple	Kerry Washington and Shawn Wayans	Won
Golden Raspberry Award	Worst Remake or Rip-off	of Baby Buggy Bunny	Won
Stinkers Bad Movie Awards	Worst Picture	Little Man (Sony/Revolution)	Nominated
Stinkers Bad Movie Awards	Worst Director	Keenan Ivory Wayans	Nominated
Stinkers Bad Movie Awards	Worst Actor	Marlon Wayans	Nominated
Stinkers Bad Movie Awards	Worst Screenplay	Keenan Ivory Wayans, Marlon Wayans, Shawn Wayans	Nominated
Stinkers Bad Movie Awards	Most Painfully Unfunny Comedy	Keenan Ivory Wayans, Marlon Wayans, Shawn Wayans	Nominated
Stinkers Bad Movie Awards	Worst On-Screen Couple	Shawn Wayans and Marlon Wayans	Won
Stinkers Bad Movie Awards	Least "Special" Special Effects		Nominated

== Home media ==
Little Man was released on Blu-ray, UMD and DVD in the United States on November 7, 2006, and in the United Kingdom on 15 January 2007, and it was distributed by Sony Pictures Home Entertainment. It would rank second on the DVD sales chart upon its release, behind Cars.
