= Dance Flick =

2009 American film by Damien Dante Wayans

- Theatrical release poster
- Directed by: Damien Dante Wayans
- Written by: Keenen Ivory Wayans; Shawn Wayans; Marlon Wayans; Craig Wayans; Damien Dante Wayans
- Produced by: Keenen Ivory Wayans; Shawn Wayans; Marlon Wayans; Rick Alvarez; Reid O’Rourke
- Starring: Damon Wayans Jr.; Shoshana Bush; Chris Elliott; Amy Sedaris; Affion Crockett; Essence Atkins; Christina Murphy; David Alan Grier; Kim Wayans
- Cinematography: Mark Irwin
- Edited by: Jeff Cummerhill
- Music by: Erik D. Willis; Dwayne Wayans
- Production company: Wayans Brothers
- Distributed by: Paramount Pictures; MTV Films
- Release date: May 22, 2009
- Running time: 83 minutes
- Country: United States
- Language: English
- Budget: $25 million
- Box office: $32 million

Dance Flick is a 2009 American musical comedy film directed by Damien Dante Wayans in his directorial debut and written by and starring many members of the Wayans family. A parody of the dance film genre, the plot follows a suburban girl who moves to the inner city and teams up with street dancer to form a dance crew to compete in a high-stakes battle to pay off a debt to a drug lord. The film was set for release in the United States on February 6, 2009, and changed to May 22, 2009. The film received mixed-to-negative reviews from critics, despite the moderate financial success.

== Plot ==
Suburban girl Megan White (Shoshana Bush) gets into a series of misadventures when she moves to the inner-city and pursues dance. A nerdy street boy named Thomas Uncles (Damon Wayans Jr.) is passionate about street dancing, but he is stuck working for a drug lord (David Alan Grier).

Megan later befriends Thomas’ sister Charity (Essence Atkins) who has a baby and poor parenting skills. Charity has her own issues dealing with her dimwitted "baby daddy" (Shawn Wayans) who also is a bad parent. Once Megan and Thomas spend more time together, they become dance partners and begin to fall in love.

== Cast ==
- Shoshana Bush as Megan White
- Damon Wayans Jr. as Thomas Uncles
- Essence Atkins as Charity Uncles
- Affion Crockett as A-Con
- Shawn Wayans as Baby Daddy
- Amy Sedaris as Ms. Cameltoé
- David Alan Grier as Sugar Bear
- Chelsea Makela as Tracy Transfat
- Chris Elliott as Ron White (Megan's Dad)
- Brennan Hillard as Jack
- Lochlyn Munro as The Coach (Jack's Dad)
- Christina Murphy as Nora
- Marlon Wayans as Mr. Moody
- Kim Wayans as Ms. Dontwannabebothered
- Keenen Ivory Wayans as Mr. Stache
- Craig Wayans as Truck
- Ross Thomas as Tyler Gage
- George Gore II as Ray Charles
- Tichina Arnold as Aretha Robinson (Ray's Mamma)
- Lauren Bowles as Glynn White (Megan's Mom)
- Sufe Bradshaw as Keloid
- Andrew McFarlane as D
- Casey Lee as Undercover Cop
- Chaunté Wayans as Free Gas Pedestrian

== Release ==
On the opening weekend (May 22–24), the film ranked at No. 5 in the top 10 with $10,643,536 in 2,450 theaters.

== Reception ==
Rotten Tomatoes, a review aggregator, reports that 18% of 95 surveyed critics gave the film a positive review; the average rating is 3.49/10. The site's consensus reads: "Dance Flick scores a few laughs thanks to the Wayans brothers' exuberance, but it's ultimately a scattershot collection of gags without much direction." On Metacritic, it got a 40/100 "mixed or average" score based on 17 critic reviews. Peter Deburge of Variety wrote that it "delivers just enough laughs to justify its existence". Audiences polled by CinemaScore gave the film an average grade of "C" on an A+ to F scale.

== See also ==
- List of hood films
