= Chaunté Wayans =

American comedian (born 1982)

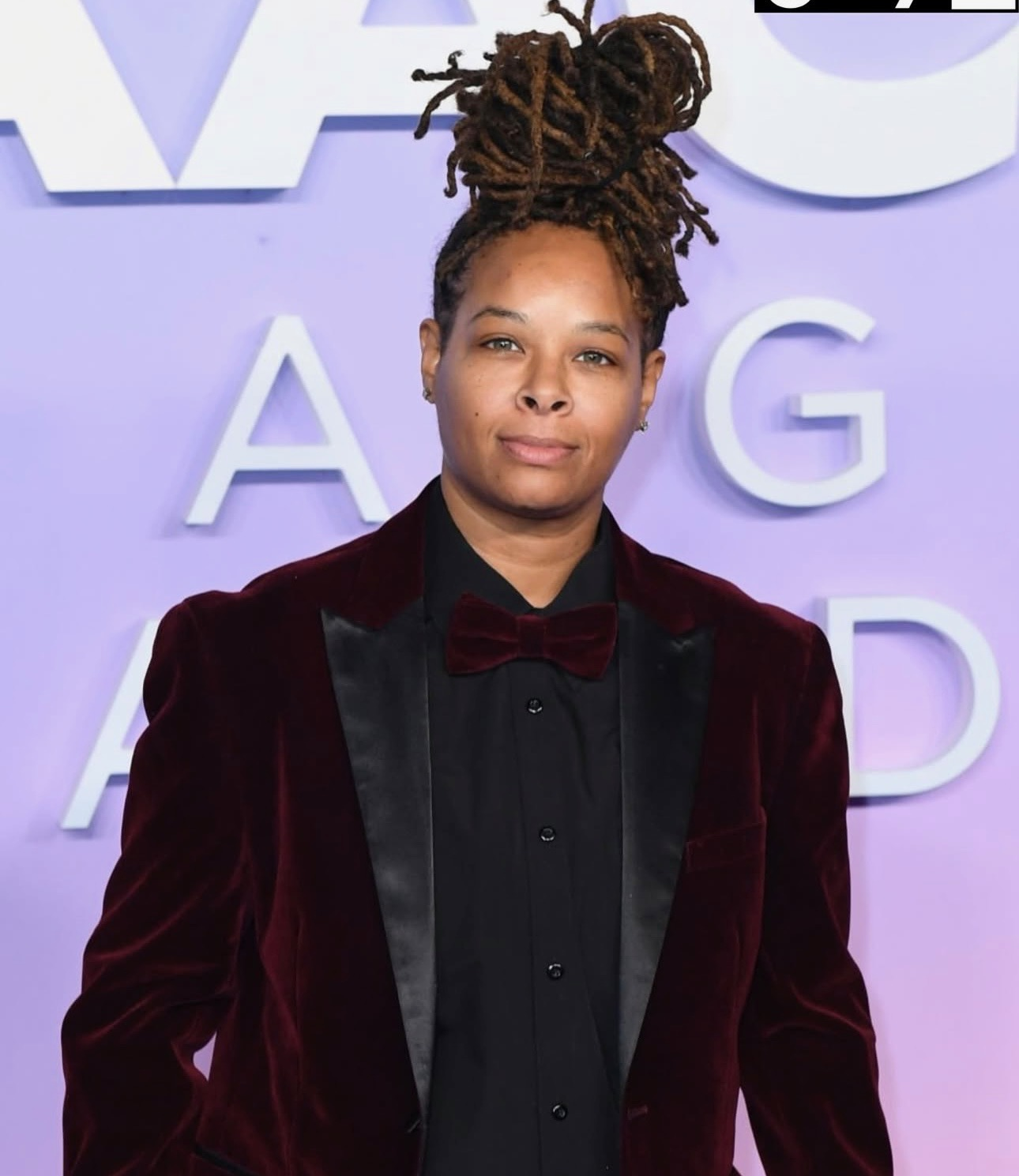
- Chaunte Wayans at NAACP Image Awards 2025
- Born: May 24, 1982 (age 44); New York City, New York, U.S.
- Relatives: Keenen Ivory Wayans, Damon Wayans, Shawn Wayans, Marlon Wayans, Kim Wayans

Comedy career
- Years active: 2001–present
- Medium: Stand-up comedy, television, film

Chaunté Wayans (/ˈweɪ.ənz/ WAY-ənz; born May 24, 1982) is an American comedian writer, and actress.

== Early life ==
Chaunté Wayans is a member of the Wayans family, whose members include Keenen Ivory Wayans, Damon Wayans, Kim Wayans, Shawn Wayans, Marlon Wayans, and her brother Damien Dante Wayans. She is the daughter of Elvira Wayans.

== Career ==
Chaunté entered the film industry as a production assistant, working on Americanizing Shelley and some of her uncles' productions, including Scary Movie 2 and My Wife and Kids. She later appeared as herself in the TLC series Trading Spaces. She made her feature film debut in 2009, alongside several extended family members, in the movie Dance Flick, in the role of Free Gas Pedestrian.

In 2013, Chaunté appeared on the MTV2 television series Wild 'n Out.

In 2019, Chaunté appeared in the stand-up comedy series Tiffany Haddish Presents: They Ready. She also appeared in multiple episodes of the truTV series Laff Mobb's Laff Tracks. In 2020, Chaunté appeared in the BET+ comedy series All The Way Black. The same year, she went on the House Arrest Comedy Tour, a virtual comedy tour held during the COVID-19 pandemic.

In 2022, Chaunté was one of the five comics to appear in the HBO Max stand-up special Marlon Wayans Presents: The Headliners. She starred in the 2023 romantic comedy Advanced Chemistry, which had a sold-out world premiere at the Dances With Films festival New York.

== Personal life ==
Chaunté is openly gay.

== Filmography ==
=== Film ===
Year	Title	Role	Notes
2001	Scary Movie 2	—N/a	Production assistant
2006	A Boo Crew Christmas: A Miracle on D-Roc's Street	—N/a	Editor
2007	Americanizing Shelley	—N/a	Production assistant
2009	Dance Flick	Free Gas Pedestrian	
2013	Hollywood Misconceptions	Comedy Host Club	Short film
2016	Fifty Shades of Black	Charlese	
2022	Marlon Wayans Presents: The Headliners	Herself	
2023	Advanced Chemistry	Marcia	

=== Television ===
Year	Title	Role	Notes
2003–2004	My Wife and Kids	—N/a	Production assistant, 30 episodes
2007	Trading Spaces	Herself	3 episodes
2013	Wild 'n Out	Herself	2 episodes
2018–2020	Laff Mobb's Laff Tracks	Herself	3 episodes
2019	Tiffany Haddish Presents: They Ready	Herself	
2020	AJ and the Queen	Cherise	Episode: "Jackson"
2020	Tournament of Laughs	Herself	Episode: "And A Round of 32 We Go, Part 2"
2020	Keep Your Distance	Herself	Episode: "Vol. 6"
2020	All the Way Black	Herself	Episode: "It's My House!"
2021	Highly Unlikely	Herself	Episode: "The Food Pyramid"
2023	This Fool	Chef Worsey	Episode: "Two F*ckin' Losers"
2023	Carol & The End of the World	Donna's Kid (voice)	Episode: "Holidays"
2024	Black Comedy in America	Herself	3 episodes
2025	Unconventional	Terry	Episode: "Whiskey Bottle"
2025	Mind Your Business	Delivery Woman	Also writer
TBA	Alask'Car	Bronco	
