= The Underground (TV series) =

- Created by: Damon Wayans
- Starring: Damon Wayans; Will Bowles; Mikey Day; Gabrielle Dennis; Josh Flaum; Vincent Oshana; Edi Patterson; Aries Spears; Damon Wayans, Jr.
- Composers: Dwayne Wayans; Tim Jones
- Country of origin: United States
- No. of seasons: 1
- No. of episodes: 10

Production
- Producers: Ashley R. Friedman; Damien Wayans
- Running time: 30 minutes
- Production company: Amara Production Films

Original release
- Network: Showtime
- Release: September 14 – November 16, 2006

The Underground is a sketch comedy television series produced by and starring Damon Wayans. It aired on Showtime. Wayans describes the show as "In Living Color on steroids." The show features raunchy behavior and as Wayans states in his opening monologue, "We decided to test the limits."

== Premise ==
The description of the show information is "The future of comedy is here in Damon Wayan's hilarious and uninhibited comedy sketch show where no topic or taboo goes unturned."

== Production ==
Following the cancellation of his ABC sitcom My Wife and Kids in 2005, Wayans conceived a new sketch comedy series. He self-financed a $700,000 pilot featuring 31 sketches and pitched it to Showtime, which acquired the show.

Pre-production for The Underground took place in Los Angeles, California, and filming took place in Burbank.

== Critical response ==
Brian Lowry of Variety said the show "plays like warmed-over improv stew that labors way too hard to shock". Virginia Heffernan of The New York Times described the show's sketches as "really not funny".

== Episodes ==
No.	Title	Original release date
1	TBA	September 14, 2006
2	TBA	September 21, 2006
3	TBA	September 28, 2006
4	TBA	October 5, 2006
5	TBA	October 12, 2006
6	TBA	October 19, 2006
7	TBA	October 26, 2006
8	TBA	November 2, 2006
9	TBA	November 9, 2006
10	TBA	November 16, 2006
