= Waynehead =

Canadian-American animated television series

- Genre: Adventure; Comedy
- Created by: Damon Wayans
- Directed by: Paul Riley
- Voices of: Orlando Brown; Tico Wells; Jamil Walker Smith; T'Keyah Crystal Keymáh; Shawn Wayans; Marlon Wayans; Kim Wayans; Gary Coleman; John Witherspoon; Frank Welker
- Theme music composer: Stanley Clarke
- Opening theme: "The Party's Just Begun" performed by Orlando Brown, Tico Wells, Jamil Walker Smith, T'Keyah Crystal Keymáh and Shawn Wayans
- Ending theme: "The Party's Just Begun" (instrumental)
- Composers: Stanley Clarke; Todd Cochran; Kennard Ramsey
- Countries of origin: United States; Canada
- Original language: English
- No. of seasons: 1
- No. of episodes: 15 (13 aired)

Production
- Executive producers: Damon Wayans; Jean MacCurdy; Eric L. Gold
- Producers: Lenord Robinson; Grant Moran; Patrick Loubert; Michael Hirsh; Clive A. Smith
- Editor: Denise Whitfield
- Running time: 22 minutes
- Production companies: Nelvana; Warner Bros. Television Animation

Original release
- Network: Kids' WB (United States); YTV (Canada)
- Release: October 19, 1996 – May 17, 1997

Waynehead is an animated television series created by actor/comedian Damon Wayans and ran from 1996 to 1997 on Kids' WB, and on YTV from 1996 to 1998. It was a co-production of Warner Bros. Television Animation and Nelvana, with overseas animation by Hanho Heung-Up Co., Ltd., and Philippine Animation Studio, Inc., while the opening sequence was animated by TMS-Kyokuchi Corporation in Japan.

Waynehead lasted for 13 episodes for one season; Wayans stated that he was told by Warner Bros. that the cartoon wasn't black enough nor funny enough, to which a WB executive replied by insisting that the show was merely low-rated. It is about a young boy named Damey Wayne, of unknown age, from a poor background and with a club foot. It was based on Wayans' own childhood in the Chelsea neighborhood in the New York City borough of Manhattan. Actors who provided voices for the show included Gary Coleman, Orlando Brown, and Marlon Wayans.

== Voice cast ==
- Orlando Brown as Damey "Waynehead" Wayne
- Tico Wells as Marvin
- Jamil Walker Smith as Mo' Money Jr.
- T'Keyah Crystal Keymáh as Roz, Shavonne, Aki
- Shawn Wayans as Toof
- Marlon Wayans as Blue
- Gary Coleman as Kevin
- Kim Wayans as Mrs. Wayne
- John Witherspoon as Mr. Wayne
- Frank Welker as Tripod
- Andrea Martin as Miss Nattlehoff
- Jeff Bennett as Francis, Crazy Calvin, Trampoline
- David Alan Grier as The Glove, The Blues Man
- Bumper Robinson as Byron

== Episodes ==
=== Series overview ===
Season	Episodes	Originally released	
Season	Episodes	First released	Last released
1	13	October 19, 1996	May 17, 1997

No.	Title	Written by	Original release date	Prod. code
1	"Demon of the Dozens"	Tim Hightower, Brad Kaaya, and Carmenita Bravo	October 19, 1996	102
Damey digs for dirt when his battle with Byron the school bully turns into a "dozens" fight, a contest of insults.
2	"No Mo' Money"	Chris Otsuki	October 26, 1996	101
Damey tries to earn money for the Harlem Week Festival. Song featured: "Street Talk Rap", sung by Damey Wayne and Roz.
3	"Brothers and Bros."	Kevin Hopps	November 2, 1996	103
Damey learns the difference between friends and family when he sneaks out of the house to run with his gang.
4	"Botswana Aki and the Hydrant of Doom"	David Wyatt	November 9, 1996	104
Damey's angry when he's forced to spend the day with the nerdy new kid, but when Aki is endangered by a run-in with the Hydrant of Doom, Damey sets out to rescue his unlikely friend. Guest Star: Heavy D Note: The song "Nuttin' but Love" by Heavy D is featured.
5	"3 Hats and You're Out"	Reed Moran	November 16, 1996	105
Damey's gang catapults to coolness when his L.A. cousin, Three Hats, starts hanging with them. But the gang's loyalty is tested when their new leader demands an old member be cut.
6	"Dad's a Spaz"	Kevin Hopps	November 23, 1996	106
Damey asks his father to coach the gang for a basketball game against the tough St. Mary's team and soon realizes his father's a disaster on the court. Song featured: "We Got Chocolate on The Wall", sung by Toof.
7	"Be Mine...or Else"	Dianne Dixon	December 31, 1996	108
Roz accidentally falls in love with Damey when he rescues her from junkyard dogs. Note: The song "I'll Be Good to You" by Brothers Johnson is featured.
8	"To Be Cool or Not to Be"	Chris Otsuki	February 1, 1997	107
Damey's desperate to keep his opera role a secret from the guys, but circumstances conspire against him.
9	"Special Delivery"	Dianne Dixon	February 15, 1997	110
Damey and his friends struggle to get his mother to the hospital when she goes into labor at the library. Song featured: "NBA Finals Montage (Instrumental)"
10	"Quest for Fireworks"	Tim Hightower, Brad Kaaya, and Carmenita Bravo	April 19, 1997	109
When Toof and Damey happen to find a firecracker the night before the 4th of July, the gang thinks they've got a secret course for illegal fireworks. Song featured: "I Got the Firecracker", sung by Toof.
11	"A Friend in Greed"	Kevin Hopps	April 26, 1997	113
Damey's broke when Marvin gives him a Ken Griffey, Jr. autographed glove with the money he stole from the gang.
12	"Bummed Out"	David Wyatt	May 3, 1997	111
Damey helps a homeless DJ who works on his guilt over a prank they'd pulled just before the man was fired.
13	"Rebel Without a Paw"	David Wyatt	May 17, 1997	112
Damey tries to help Tripod find a new owner after he is accused of mischief in a convenience store, which proves difficult because of his missing paw. Song featured: "It's Called the Blues", sung by The Blues Man.

Two other episodes, "Hello Baby, Goodbye Wayne" and "Back Home", were produced but were never aired.

== Production ==
The series was first announced in 1991 as The Wayneheads. It was originally going to be a claymation series and was going to air in primetime on Fox. The concept was shelved and was retooled as a traditionally-animated, Saturday morning series that took influence off of the 1992 movie Bebe's Kids, the show ran on Kids' WB from 1996 to 1997.

== Broadcast ==
The show was aired on Kids' WB from 1996 to 1997, and eventually aired reruns on Cartoon Network from 1998 to 2000.

=== International ===
In Canada, Waynehead aired on YTV from 1996 to 1998.

In Germany, Waynehead aired on ProSieben, Junior, and K-Toon under the name of Waynehead - Echt cool, Mann!.

In Austria, the series aired on ORF 1.

In the United Kingdom, the series aired on CITV in 1998.

In Israel, Waynehead aired on Arutz HaYeladim.

In Ireland, Waynehead aired on RTÉ2.

In Netherlands, Waynehead aired on Cartoon Network.

== Home media ==
Since April 20, 2021, Waynehead was released on iTunes, Amazon Video and Fandango at Home.

== References in other media ==
- The theme song is parodied in the Pinky and the Brain episode "Dangerous Brains".
- A reel with the show's logo on it is shown in the Teen Titans Go! episode "Huggbees".
