= Poppa's House =

- Genre: Sitcom
- Created by: Damon Wayans & Kevin Hench
- Starring: Damon Wayans; Damon Wayans Jr.; Essence Atkins; Tetona Jackson
- Music by: Damon Wayans
- Country of origin: United States
- Original language: English
- No. of seasons: 1
- No. of episodes: 18

Production
- Executive producers: Damon Wayans; Damon Wayans Jr.; Kevin Hench; Andy Ackerman; Dean Lorey; Michael Petok
- Producers: Dave Neglia; Kameron Tarlow; Chris Arrington; Tom Ragazzo
- Cinematography: Donald A. Morgan; John Simmons
- Editors: Pamela Marshall; Angel Gamboa Bryant; Michael Karlich
- Camera setup: Multi-camera
- Production companies: Hench in the Trench Productions; NuSystems Productions, Inc.; Two Shakes Entertainment; CBS Studios; Lorey Stories

Original release
- Network: CBS
- Release: October 21, 2024 – April 28, 2025

Poppa's House is an American television sitcom that aired from October 21, 2024, to April 28, 2025 on CBS. The series stars Damon Wayans as Poppa, Damon Wayans Jr. as Damon, Essence Atkins as Ivy, and Tetona Jackson as Nina. The series was created by Damon Wayans and Kevin Hench. In April 2025, the series was canceled after one season, ending with an unresolved cliffhanger.

== Cast and characters ==
=== Main ===
- Damon Wayans Sr. as Poppa, a popular New York City radio DJ. It is later revealed his full name is Damon "Poppa" Fulton.
- Damon Wayans Jr. as Junior, who works for his father-in-law but wants to produce documentaries. It is later revealed his full name is Damon "Junior" Fulton.
- Essence Atkins as Dr. Ivy Reed, Poppa's new co-host
- Tetona Jackson as Nina, Junior's wife who is an event planner

=== Recurring ===
- Geoffrey Owens as J.J., Nina's father
- Caleb Johnson as Trey, Junior and Nina's son
- River Blossom as Maya, Junior and Nina's daughter
- Wendy Raquel Robinson as Catherine, Poppa's ex-wife and Junior's mother

=== Notable guest stars ===
- Charo as herself
- Marlon Wayans as Melvin, Poppa's younger brother who is a con artist
- Vivica A. Fox as Judge "Say Wha?", a judge that Junior clashes with

== Episodes ==
No.	Title	Directed by	Written by	Original release date	U.S. viewers (millions)
1	"Pilot"	Andy Ackerman	Kevin Hench & Damon Wayans	October 21, 2024	4.20
2	"Sleepover"	Kelly Park	Dean Lorey & Damon Wayans	October 28, 2024	3.54
3	"Podcast"	Robert Townsend	Kim Wayans & Kevin Knotts	November 4, 2024	3.29
4	"School Days"	Kim Wayans	Leslie Schapira	November 11, 2024	3.46
5	"Disciplinairian"	Phill Lewis	Erica Montolfo-Bura	November 25, 2024	3.20
6	"Family Photo"	Kelly Park	Romanski	December 2, 2024	3.37
7	"Brokeback"	Kim Wayans	Michael Wayans	December 9, 2024	3.16
8	"Wig"	Robert Townsend	Phil Beauman & Shawn Wayans	December 16, 2024	3.42
9	"Puppy"	Phill Lewis	Chris Lorey	January 27, 2025	3.67
10	"Elevator Friend"	Kelly Park	Michael Wayans	February 3, 2025	3.38
11	"Dirty Laundry"	Kim Wayans	Dean Lorey & Damon Wayans	February 10, 2025	3.58
12	"Slumber Party"	Phill Lewis	Adrian Colón, Jr.	February 24, 2025	3.60
13	"Graduation"	Robert Townsend	Phil Beauman & Shawn Wayans	March 3, 2025	3.32
14	"Melvin"	Kim Wayans	Dean Lorey & Damon Wayans	March 24, 2025	3.48
15	"Say Wha?!"	Damien Dante Wayans	Teleplay by : Kim Wayans & Kevin Knotts; Story by : Kristin Layne Tucker & Jack Sentell	March 31, 2025	3.64
16	"Game of Phones"	Phill Lewis	Teleplay by : Romanski & Leslie Schapira; Story by : Brittnay Johnston & Jess Lieberman	April 14, 2025	3.12
17	"Babygirl"	Robert Townsend	Teleplay by : Cara Mia Wayans & Kyla Wayans; Story by : Amara Wayans & Aniya Wayans	April 21, 2025	3.48
18	"Magic Shine Again"	Robert Townsend	Teleplay by : Phil Beauman & Shawn Wayans; Story by : Chris Lorey & Keenen Wayans Jr.	April 28, 2025	3.32

== Production ==
=== Development ===
Poppa's House was announced on October 10, 2022. The pilot for Poppa's House was ordered on February 8, 2023. The pilot was written by Damon Wayans & Kevin Hench, and it was directed by Andy Ackerman. Production companies involved with Poppa's House include Amara Films, Hench in the Trench Productions, Two Shakes Entertainment, and CBS Studios. Poppa's House was given a series order on May 9, 2023. Poppa's House was moved to the 2024–25 season due to 2023 strike-related production delays. CBS received a full season order of 18 episodes on November 7, 2024. On April 22, 2025, CBS announced the cancellation of the series, with its final episode airing on April 28, 2025.

=== Casting ===
Upon pilot order announcement, Damon Wayans and Damon Wayans Jr. were cast to series. When CBS gave a series order, Essence Atkins and Tetona Jackson joined the cast in starring roles. On August 9, 2024, Wendy Raquel Robinson was cast in a recurring capacity. On December 20, 2023, it was reported that Marlon Wayans and Vivica A. Fox are set to guest star. On February 6, 2025, it was announced that Charo is set to guest star as herself.

=== Filming ===
Poppa's House is filmed at Radford Studio Center in Los Angeles, California but is set in New York City, New York.

== Broadcast ==
Poppa's House premiered on October 21, 2024, on CBS. In Canada, the series airs on Global and is available to stream on StackTV.

== Reception ==
=== Critical response ===
The review aggregator website Rotten Tomatoes reported an 88% approval rating based on 8 critic reviews. Metacritic, which uses a weighted average, assigned a score of 62 out of 100 based on 7 critics, indicating "generally favorable" reviews.

==== Accolades ====
Award	Year	Category	Nominee(s)	Result	Ref.
American Cinema Editors	2025	Best Edited Multi-Camera Comedy Series	Angel Gamboa Bryant (for "Sleepover")	Nominated	
Art Directors Guild	2025	Excellence in Production Design for a Multi-Camera Series	Aiyana Trotter (for "Family Photo" and "Wig")	Nominated	
Art Directors Guild	2026	Excellence in Production Design for a Multi-Camera Series	Aiyana Trotter (for "Baby Girl" and "Magic Shine Again")	Nominated	
Kids' Choice Awards	2025	Favorite Male TV Star (Family)	Damon Wayans Jr.	Nominated	
NAACP Image Awards	2025	Outstanding Comedy Series	Poppa's House	Nominated	
NAACP Image Awards	2025	Outstanding Actor in a Comedy Series	Damon Wayans	Won	
NAACP Image Awards	2025	Outstanding Supporting Actor in a Comedy Series	Damon Wayans Jr.	Won	
NAMIC Vision Awards	2025	Comedy	Poppa's House	Nominated	

=== Ratings ===
Viewership and ratings per episode of Poppa's House
No.	Title	Air date	Rating/share (18–49)	Viewers (millions)	DVR (18–49)	DVR viewers (millions)	Total (18–49)	Total viewers (millions)	Ref.
1	"Pilot"	October 21, 2024	0.4/4	4.20	0.1	0.86	0.5	5.06	
2	"Sleepover"	October 28, 2024	0.4/3	3.54	0.0	0.68	0.4	4.22	
3	"Podcast"	November 4, 2024	0.4/3	3.29	0.0	0.74	0.4	4.03	
4	"School Day"	November 11, 2024	0.3/3	3.46	0.1	0.64	0.4	4.10	
5	"Disciplinairian"	November 25, 2024	0.4/4	3.20	0.0	0.51	0.4	3.71	
6	"Family Photo"	December 2, 2024	0.3/4	3.37	0.1	0.53	0.4	3.90	
7	"Brokeback"	December 9, 2024	0.3/3	3.16	0.1	0.61	0.4	3.77	
8	"Wig"	December 16, 2024	0.3/3	3.42	0.1	0.55	0.4	3.97	
9	"Puppy"	January 27, 2025	0.3/4	3.67	0.1	0.50	0.4	4.18	
10	"Elevator Friend"	February 3, 2025	0.3/5	3.38	0.1	0.52	0.4	3.89	
11	"Dirty Laundry"	February 10, 2025	0.4/5	3.58	0.0	0.49	0.4	4.07	
12	"Slumber Party"	February 24, 2025	0.4/5	3.60	0.1	0.54	0.4	4.14	
13	"Graduation"	March 3, 2025	0.3/4	3.32	0.1	0.52	0.4	3.85	
14	"Melvin"	March 24, 2025	0.3/4	3.48	0.1	0.59	0.4	4.07	
15	"Say Wha?!"	March 31, 2025	0.3/5	3.64	TBD	TBD	TBD	TBD	
16	"Game of Phones"	April 14, 2025	0.3/4	3.12	TBD	TBD	TBD	TBD	
17	"Babygirl"	April 21, 2025	0.3/4	3.48	TBD	TBD	TBD	TBD	
18	"Magic Shine Again"	April 28, 2025	0.3/4	3.32	TBD	TBD	TBD	TBD	
