= Essence Atkins =

American actress (born 1972)

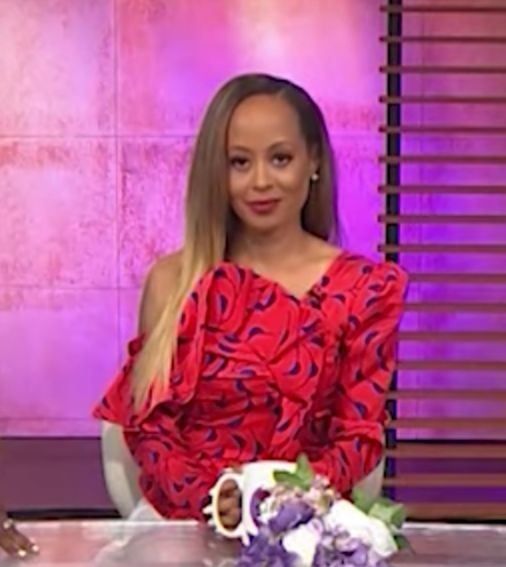
- Atkins in 2019
- Born: Essence Uhura Atkins; February 7, 1972 (age 54); Brooklyn, New York, U.S.
- Occupation: Actress
- Years active: 1986–present
- Spouse: Jaime Mendez (m. 2009; div. 2016)
- Children: 1

Essence Uhura Atkins (born February 7, 1972) is an American actress. She began her career appearing on television sitcoms, before her regular role on the prime-time drama Under One Roof (CBS, 1995).

Atkins is best known for her roles on television comedies. From 1997 to 1999, she starred as Tasha Yvette Henderson in The WB sitcom Smart Guy. She later went to star as Dee Dee Thorne in UPN sitcom Half & Half (2002–2006), Suzanne Kingston-Persons in TBS sitcom Are We There Yet? (2010–2013) and as Ashley Wayne in NBC sitcom Marlon (2017–2018). In film, Atkins has appeared in How High (2001), Deliver Us from Eva (2003), Dance Flick (2009), A Haunted House (2013), A Haunted House 2 (2014), and The Noel Diary (2022).

== Career ==
Atkins began her career as a teenager guest starring on NBC sitcom The Cosby Show in 1986. The following years she spent playing guest roles on sitcoms include Family Matters, before landing co-leading role opposite James Earl Jones and Vanessa Bell Calloway in the African-American drama Under One Roof in 1995. The following year, she co-starred with Keri Russell in the NBC teen soap opera Malibu Shores. One of her television roles was in the Saved by the Bell spin-off, Saved by the Bell: The College Years in 1993. She appeared in the pilot, but when Tiffani-Amber Thiessen, a regular from the original, opted to return, Atkins's character was written out.

From 1997 to 1999, Atkins starred in the WB sitcom Smart Guy as the older sister Tasha Yvette Henderson. From 2002 to 2006 she starred alongside Rachel True in the UPN sitcom Half & Half playing Dee Dee Thorne, her half-sister. She also had supporting roles in films How High (2001), Deliver Us from Eva (2003) opposite Gabrielle Union, and Dance Flick (2009). From 2010 to 2013, she starred in the TBS sitcom series Are We There Yet? opposite Terry Crews. Atkins later starred alongside Marlon Wayans in the parody films A Haunted House (2013) and A Haunted House 2 (2014). In 2016, she was cast opposite Wayans in his NBC sitcom Marlon. it was canceled after two seasons in 2018.

In 2019, Atkins was cast in a leading role in the Oprah Winfrey Network drama series Ambitions opposite Robin Givens.

== Personal life ==
In September 2009, Atkins married All-American collegiate football free safety Jaime Mendez. They met Valentine's Day 2008 through the online dating service Match.com. Her Half and Half co-star Valarie Pettiford performed during the reception. They divorced in 2016.

== Filmography ==
=== Film ===
Year	Title	Role	Notes
1999	Nikita's Blues	Nikita	Short
2000	Love Song	Toni	TV movie
2001	Nikita Blues	Nikita	
2001	Looking Through Lillian	Andrea	
2001	XCU: Extreme Close Up	Tamikah Jones	
2001	How High	Jamie	
2003	Deliver Us from Eva	Kareenah Dandridge	
2007	Love... & Other 4 Letter Words	Roxanne	
2008	Love for Sale	Candace	
2009	Dance Flick	Charity	
2010	Preacher's Kid	Peaches	
2010	N-Secure	Robin Joyner	
2011	The Bachelor Party	Michelle	Video
2012	Dysfunctional Friends	Alice	
2012	From This Day Forward	Patrice	TV movie
2013	A Haunted House	Kisha Davis	
2013	Act Like You Love Me	Kelly	
2013	My Sisters Wedding	Tandy	
2013	Holiday Road Trip	Clara	TV movie
2014	A Haunted House 2	Kisha Davis	
2014	Girlfriends' Getaway	Lauren	TV movie
2014	My Other Mother	Candy	TV movie
2015	Sister Code	Corrine Wells	
2015	Battle Scars	Elsie Ramirez	
2015	Girlfriends' Getaway 2	Lauren	TV movie
2016	You Can't Hurry Love	Camille	TV movie
2017	Solstice Ranch	Lola Solstice	Short
2017	Illicit	Nadine	
2018	Coins for Christmas	Madison Morris	TV movie
2019	Same Difference	Tonya/Shauna	
2020	Open	Wren	TV movie
2020	The Sin Choice	Rebecca Anderson	
2020	Coins for Love	Madison Morris	TV movie
2021	Coins Forever	Madison Morris	TV movie
2022	The Noel Diary	Noel Ellis	
2023	Angie's Cure	Sheila Hart	
2024	One Night Stay	April	
2024	Sea Cloud Park	Judy	Short
2025	He Wasn't Man Enough	Monica	TV movie
2026	Breathe Again	Evelyn	TV movie

=== Television ===
Year	Title	Role	Notes
1986–1989	The Cosby Show	Paula Young	Guest Cast: Season 3 & 6
1991	Charlie Hoover	Amy	Episode: "Out of the Frying Pan"
1992	Family Matters	Becky	Episode: "Brown Bombshell"
1992	Here and Now	Khalila	2 episodes
1993	Saved by the Bell: The College Years	Danielle Marks	Episode: "Pilot"
1995	Under One Roof	Charlotte "Charlie" Langston	Main Cast
1995	The Wayans Bros.	Nina	Episode: "Farmer's Daughter"
1996	The Parent 'Hood	Chantel	Episode: "One Man and a Baby"
1996	Malibu Shores	Julie Tate	Main Cast
1996	The John Larroquette Show	Jocelyn	2 episodes
1997–1999	Smart Guy	Yvette Henderson	Main Cast
1998	Promised Land	Rachel	Episode: "Mirror Image"
1999	Moesha	Piper Davis	2 episodes
2000	Sabrina the Teenage Witch	Marnie	Recurring Cast: Season 4
2002	For Your Love	Genesis	Episode: "The Missing Link"
2002–2006	Half & Half	Deirdre Chantal "Dee Dee" Thorne	Main Cast
2004	MADtv	Herself	Episode: "Episode #10.7"
2005	Love, Inc.	Renee	Episode: "Mad About You"
2007	The Class	Melanie Deacon	Episode: "The Class Has to Go to a Stupid Museum"
2007	House	Captain Greta Cooper	Episode: "The Right Stuff"
2009	Nite Tales: The Series	Shandra	Episode: "Dark Heart"
2010	Tyler Perry's House of Payne	Monica	Recurring Cast: Season 6
2010–2013	Are We There Yet?	Suzanne Kingston-Persons	Main Cast
2011	Life After	Herself	Episode: "AJ Johnson"
2012–2015	Mr. Box Office	Samantha Owens	Main Cast
2013	Annual Trumpet Awards	Herself/Co-Host	Main Co-Host
2016	Celebrity Family Feud	Herself	Episode: "Episode #3.10"
2017	Face Value	Herself/Team Captain	Episode: "Essence Atkins v Affion Crockett"
2017	Kiki Mobile	Herself	Episode: "Kiki Hits the Trails"
2017	The Great Indoors	Denise	Episode: "The Heartbreaker"
2017–2018	Marlon	Ashley Wayne	Main Cast
2019	A Black Lady Sketch Show	Hannah	Episode: "3rd & Bonaparte Is Always in the Shade"
2019	Carol's Second Act	Kathleen	Episode: "Game Changer"
2019	Ambitions	Amara Hughesken	Main Cast
2020	Behind Her Faith	Herself	Episode: "Essence Atkins"
2021–2022	First Wives Club	Maxine Hart	Recurring Cast: Season 2–3
2022	A Black Lady Sketch Show	Chef Rayna	Episode: "Bounce Them Coochies, Y'all!"
2022	Family Reunion	Maureen	2 episodes
2023	Gabrielle Union: My Journey to 50	Herself	Main Guest
2023	The Ms. Pat Show	Charnelle	Episode: "Twenty Seven Side Pieces"
2023	The Company You Keep	Shelby	2 episodes
2024	Curb Your Enthusiasm	Renee Holcomb	Episode: "The Dream Scheme"
2024	Reasonable Doubt	Dr. Brandy Michaels	2 episodes
2024–2025	Poppa's House	Dr. Ivy Reed	Main Cast
2026	Life, Larry and the Pursuit of Unhappiness	Clara	Episode: "Buzz"

== Awards and nominations ==
Awards	Year	Category	Nominated Work	Result	Ref.
American Black Film Festival	2019	Best Performance by an Actor	Same Difference	Won	
NAACP Image Award	2005	Outstanding Supporting Actress in a Comedy Series	Half & Half	Nominated	
NAACP Image Award	2011	Outstanding Actress in a Comedy Series	Are We There Yet?	Nominated	
NAACP Image Award	2019	Outstanding Supporting Actress in a Comedy Series	Marlon	Nominated	
