= Scary Movie (2026 film) =

2026 film by Michael Tiddes

- Theatrical release poster
- Directed by: Michael Tiddes
- Written by: Marlon Wayans; Shawn Wayans; Keenen Ivory Wayans; Craig Wayans; Rick Alvarez
- Based on: Characters by: Shawn Wayans; Marlon Wayans; Buddy Johnson; Phil Beauman; Jason Friedberg Aaron Seltzer
- Produced by: Marlon Wayans; Shawn Wayans; Keenen Ivory Wayans; Craig Wayans; Rick Alvarez
- Starring: Marlon Wayans; Shawn Wayans; Anna Faris; Regina Hall
- Cinematography: Terry Stacey
- Edited by: Jonathan Schwartz
- Music by: Haim Mazar
- Production company: Wayans Bros. Entertainment
- Distributed by: Paramount Pictures
- Release dates: June 3, 2026 (Los Angeles); June 5, 2026 (United States)
- Running time: 96 minutes
- Country: United States
- Language: English
- Budget: $30 million
- Box office: $231.9 million

Scary Movie (also known as Scary Movie 6) is a 2026 American parody film directed by Michael Tiddes and written by Marlon Wayans, Shawn Wayans, Keenen Ivory Wayans, Craig Wayans, and Rick Alvarez. It is the sixth installment in the Scary Movie film series and has been referred to as the spiritual sequel to the first two films. It stars Marlon, Shawn, Anna Faris, and Regina Hall. The plot follows Cindy Campbell and her friends Ray Wilkins and siblings Shorty and Brenda Meeks reunited when the same masked killer from the original film Scary Movie resurfaces.

A sixth Scary Movie film was announced in 2024 and later that same year, it was revealed to have the involvement of the Wayans family for the first time since their departure from the franchise following the release of Scary Movie 2 (2001) due to creative conflicts with the original producers.

Scary Movie premiered on June 3, 2026, at the Paramount Theatre in Los Angeles, and was released theatrically in the United States by Paramount Pictures on June 5, 2026. Like its predecessors, it received generally negative reviews from critics, but was a commercial success, grossing $231.9 million against a $30 million budget, becoming the second-highest grossing film in the series after the first installment.

== Plot ==
While watching Horror Movie—an in-universe spoof of Scary Movie—teenager Tuesday Campbell is attacked by Ghostface. Tuesday's drug addict older half-sister Sara and her boyfriend Jack Kirsch learn that Tuesday is hospitalized, and suspect the attack is similar to the killing spree conducted by original Ghostface Doofy Gilmore in 2000. (Note: As depicted in Scary Movie (2000)) They visit Sara's estranged mother Cindy Campbell, who has become a paranoid recluse. Cindy refuses to help as she suspects the killer is luring her out, which upsets Sara.

Tuesday's high school friends, Brenda Meeks's children Brad and Dei, Brad's girlfriend Elle McKenzie, and town sheriff Greg Phillippe's transgender son Jess, also learn about the attack. The group is soon joined by Brenda's stoner brother Shorty. Brenda, now calling herself "Ma", attends church with her husband Ray Wilkins, who claims to have renounced his homosexuality.

Sara and Jack are attacked by Ghostface in the hospital but escape. They visit Doofy, who has reverted back to his mentally disabled persona. Doofy reluctantly agrees to help and the trio go to Brenda's house. Cindy, having a change of heart, also arrives and Brenda starts theorizing what the plot is. They conclude that Ghostface is taking the "rebootquel" approach by bringing back legacy characters while introducing new ones, and thus, all the original characters are now in danger.

As Ghostface murders Greg and Jess, reporter Gail Hailstorm reconnects with former lover Doofy and trades a handjob for information. Ghostface attacks Tuesday again at the hospital, but Sara and Doofy come to her rescue. Ghostface kills Doofy while Sara gets Tuesday out and are saved by Cindy and Brenda. That night, Shorty smokes too much weed and Ghostface hypnotizes him into a KPop Demon Hunters-style animated sequence.

Shorty hosts a livestream where Ghostface murders celebrity guest Kai Cenat. He also infiltrates an experimental procedure Gail undertakes to make her look young again, injecting her with "The Stuff" before killing her alternate self. (Note: Identified as Tiffany Wilson from White Chicks (2004)) Dei is on the way home in a subway, but Ghostface and several passengers, fed up with their liberal perspectives, stab them to death. While Brenda hosts a Halloween costume party, Brad is killed in the garden. Cindy steals a car and breaks into Brenda's house, fighting a wave of Ghostfaces John Wick style.

Ghostface reveals herself as Elle, with Jack as her accomplice. They explain that they want to take over the Scary Movie franchise from the legacy characters. Four more Ghostfaces appear and kill them; they reveal themselves as Anthony Anderson and Shaquille O'Neal, accompanied by Shorty and Ray, who planned the ending plot twist all along. Anthony and Shaquille are betrayed and killed by Shorty and Ray, who have a grudge against Anthony, Shaquille, Cindy and Brenda for participating in Scary Movie 3 and Scary Movie 4 without them. Cindy reminds them that the original four Scary Movie characters are now reunited, convincing them to end the killing spree.

Sara and Tuesday are ecstatic to be the new final girls and propose headlining the franchise going forward with the original characters serving as support, but when they start insulting their elders, Cindy, Brenda, Shorty, and Ray tie them up and leave them to burn to death in the house, declaring that no one will take over the Scary Movie franchise from them.

== Cast ==
- Marlon Wayans as Shorty Meeks
- Shawn Wayans as Ray Wilkins
- Anna Faris as Cindy Campbell
- Regina Hall as Brenda Meeks
- Kenan Thompson as Jermaine
- Dave Sheridan as Doofy Gilmore / Ghostface (voice)
- Lochlyn Munro as Greg Phillippe
- Kim Wayans as Nurse Ratchett
- Cheri Oteri as Gail Hailstorm
- Chris Elliott as Shorthand, an eccentric man with a malformed left hand
- Damon Wayans Jr. as Agent Underwood
- Heidi Gardner as Agent Berger
- Olivia Rose Keegan as Sara Campbell, Cindy's older daughter
- Cameron Scott Roberts as Jack Kirsch, Sara's boyfriend
- Savannah Lee Nassif as Tuesday Campbell, Cindy's younger daughter
- Sydney Park as Dei Meeks, Brenda's nonbinary child and Brad's twin
- Gregg Wayans as Brad Meeks, Brenda's son and Dei's twin
- Benny Zielke as Jess, Greg's transgender son
- Ruby Snowber as Elle, Brad's girlfriend
- Jon Abrahams as Bobby Prinze, Cindy's ex-boyfriend
- Deon Cole as Pastor Prime

In addition to Shorty, Marlon briefly reprises his role as Tiffany Wilson from White Chicks (2004), while also portraying Joe Jackson in an in-film trailer for Jermaine and Count Brolock in a parody of Nosferatu (2024) in a mid-credits scene. Cameos in the film include Carmen Electra as a bartender and Felissa Rose as a bar patron in the film's opening with Teyana Taylor as herself in the in-universe "Horror Movie" film. Electra previously appeared as Drew Decker in the opening scene of the first Scary Movie and Holly in Scary Movie 4 (2006). Kai Cenat, Anthony Anderson, and Shaquille O'Neal portray fictionalized versions of themselves; Anderson previously starred in both Scary Movie 3 (2003) and Scary Movie 4 as Mahalik Phifer, while O'Neal reprises the role as himself after appearing in the opening scene of the fourth film.

== Production ==
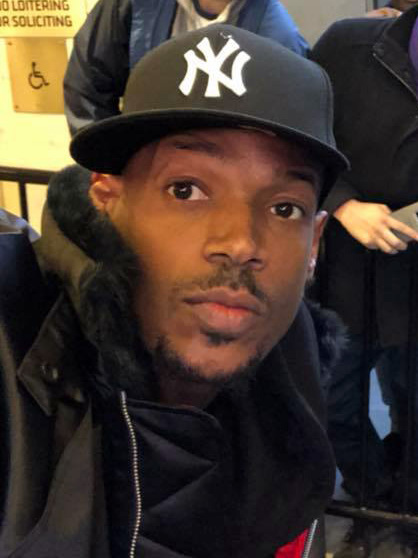
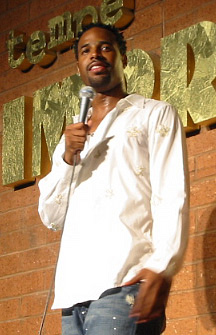
The film marked the return of brothers Marlon (left) and Shawn Wayans (right) as producers, co-writers, and stars of the franchise since Scary Movie 2 (2001).

=== Background ===
After the success of Scary Movie 2 (2001), the Wayans brothers—Marlon, Shawn and Keenen Ivory—who co-wrote both Scary Movie (2000) and the sequel with Keenen Ivory serving as director and starring Marlon and Shawn as Shorty Meeks and Ray Wilkins respectively, pitched their idea for the third Scary Movie film at the same time that they were pitching the idea for White Chicks (2004). Their pitch for the third film was reportedly met with approval. According to Marlon, however, the two parties could not come to a deal primarily because Miramax's initial pay offer was only equal to what had been agreed upon for the first film, which would mean the Wayans would actually be taking a pay cut. Higher offers were then made after the White Chicks film idea was greenlit, but still below the initial pay demand that the Wayans had asked for at the start of negotiations. The Wayans brothers then chose to prioritize the White Chicks film while their pitch would then reportedly be used as the basis for Scary Movie 3 (2003) without their involvement. After the Wayans left the project, Keenen Ivory encouraged Anna Faris not to star in the film; however, Faris was under a three-picture contract and feared the financial consequences of a potential lawsuit if she broke it. According to Anthony Anderson, he signed on to the film due to an ambition of working with Marlon and Shawn because of his friendship with the family, prior to realizing they had exited the franchise. After completing filming on the movie A Haunted House, Marlon Wayans, who had co-written and starred in the film, reportedly received an offer from The Weinstein Company to buy the film rights. According to Wayans, The Weinstein Company's ultimate intention seemed to be to buy and then shelve A Haunted House in order to use the ideas for the then-upcoming Scary Movie 5 film. The offer, however, was ultimately rejected, and A Haunted House premiered in theaters in 2013.

=== Development ===
At CinemaCon in April 2024, Miramax announced that a new Scary Movie film was in development, with the studio fully financing the project and Neal H. Moritz attached as an executive producer. In October that same year, the brothers announced that they would return as screenwriters and producers, marking their first collaboration in 17 years. Rick Alvarez and Michael Tiddes were hired to co-write and direct, respectively, after collaborating with Marlon in other films. It was produced by Marlon's and Alvarez's Ugly Baby Productions label. Marlon described the film as being a "rebooquel" and additionally cited two factors on the brothers' return to the franchise; the downfall of producers Bob and Harvey Weinstein and words of encouragement from their father, Howell Stouten Wayans prior to his death in 2023. Marlon and his siblings were later contacted by Jonathan Glickman shortly after being named CEO of Miramax and backed the film with a $30 million production budget.

==== Parodies ====
In September 2025, Marlon commented that recent horror films such as Get Out (2017), Nope (2022), Longlegs (2024), Heretic (2024), and Sinners (2025) could be parodied, as well as the Scream (1996–present) and I Know What You Did Last Summer (1997–2025) franchises, which were primarily used for the plot of the original film. The film also references the slasher Terrifier 3 (2024) in a scene that features appearances by Felissa Rose and Michael Leavy. The scene, which depicts Art the Clown dressed as Santa Claus in a mall with children, was initially removed but later reinstated in a trimmed-down edit. Get Out, Longlegs, Sinners, Scream (2022), and Scream VI (2023) were confirmed with the release of the film's trailer in March 2026, alongside Halloween (2018), Smile (2022), M3GAN (2022), The Substance (2024), and Weapons (2025), with references to Jason Voorhees from the Friday the 13th franchise, Leatherface from The Texas Chainsaw Massacre franchise, Sue Ann "Ma" Ellington from Ma (2019), Wednesday Addams from Wednesday (2022–present), and the Heart Eyes Killer from Heart Eyes (2025). The film also parodies the film Michael (2026), with Kenan Thompson playing Michael Jackson's brother Jermaine in a trailer for a similar biopic, and the Sony and Netflix animated feature KPop Demon Hunters (2025) in the form of an animated sequence. The scene was included due to Marlon watching the film with his daughter in the wake of backlash he received on having his film Him being released on the same weekend as Demon Slayer: Kimetsu no Yaiba – The Movie: Infinity Castle in October 2025. A joke about First Lady Melania Trump in a scene where Cindy was drunk at her car and mocks Trump's Be Best campaign was removed from the final cut of the film despite Faris always pushing for her character to be a "classic MAGA rabbit hole" person.

=== Casting ===
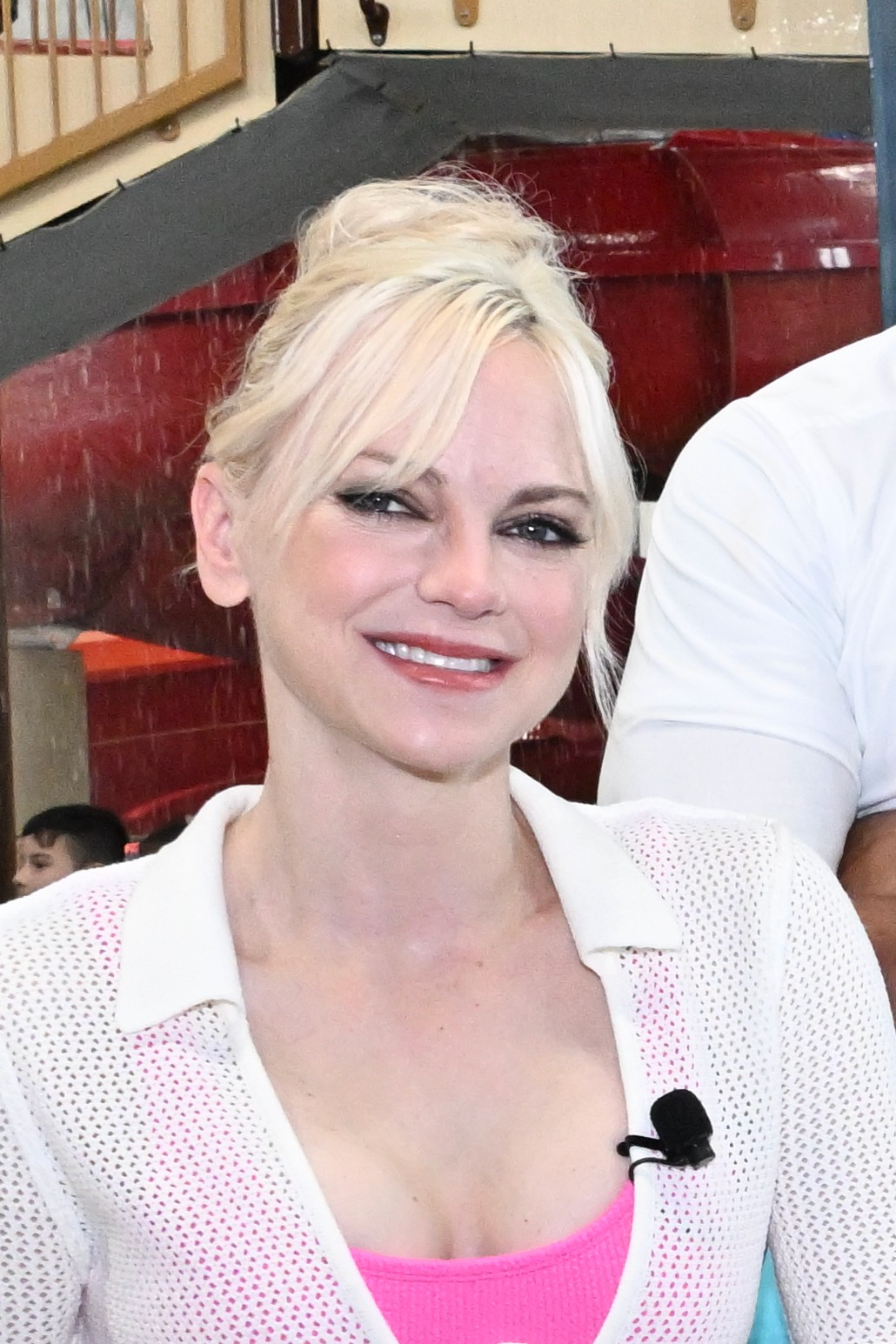
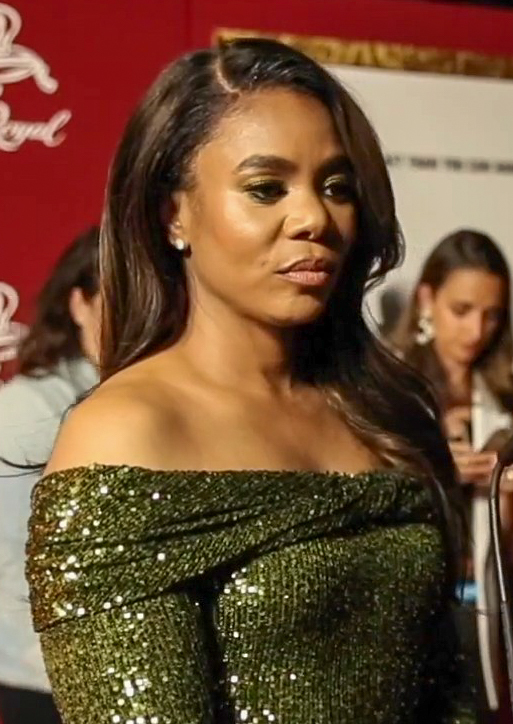
In addition to the Wayans brothers, Anna Faris and Regina Hall reprise their roles as Cindy Campbell and Brenda Meeks respectively.

Both Faris and Regina Hall, who starred in the first four installments as Cindy Campbell and Brenda Meeks, expressed interest in reprising their roles. In August 2025, Faris and Hall were confirmed to be returning in the film. In September 2025, it was revealed Marlon would reprise his role as Shorty. In November 2025, several cast members were revealed to have joined the film, including Shawn as well as returning actors Jon Abrahams, Lochlyn Munro, Cheri Oteri, Dave Sheridan, and Chris Elliott, with Damon Wayans Jr., Kim Wayans, Craig Wayans, Heidi Gardner, Olivia Rose Keegan, Savannah Lee Nassif, Cameron Scott Roberts, Sydney Park, Gregg Wayans, Ruby Snowber, and Benny Zielke as newcomers to the film series.

In February 2026, Anderson confirmed he would be appearing in the film. He later revealed that he was one of the first people to be contacted by Marlon shortly after the siblings reclaimed the franchise for a role, which Anderson later accepted. Following her exit from the pre-production of Scream 7 (2026), Melissa Barrera expressed an interest in appearing in the film in April 2024. Marlon revealed the absence of Shannon Elizabeth, who portrayed Buffy Gilmore in the first film, was due to the massive amount of returning characters and expressed support of Elizabeth's inclusion in a future installment.

=== Filming and post-production ===
Principal photography began on October 1, 2025, and wrapped on November 24. Filming took place at Tyler Perry Studios in Atlanta. To incorporate parodies of the recent films Sinners, Weapons and Michael, additional filming was done in April 2026. Jonathan Schwartz edited the film, and Haim Mazar composed the score.

== Music ==
The soundtrack to Scary Movie was released by Lakeshore Records on the same day as the film's release. The soundtrack contains 29 tracks composed by Haim Mazar.

Scary Movie (Original Motion Picture Soundtrack)

Film score by Haim Mazar
- Released: June 5, 2026
- Length: 46:27
- Label: Lakeshore

Scary Movie (Original Motion Picture Soundtrack)
No.	Title	Length
1.	"Scary Movie Main Titles"	2:07
2.	"Shorty's Fifth"	0:22
3.	"Cindy's House"	1:44
4.	"Come for the Father"	1:14
5.	"Hospital Visit"	1:08
6.	"Break Room Fight"	1:08
7.	"Doofy's House"	1:50
8.	"Special Officer Doofy"	0:54
9.	"Reunion"	1:46
10.	"Whodunit"	1:57
11.	"Baby Dick"	1:38
12.	"Shorty's Confession"	2:33
13.	"Stop Smiling!"	1:17
14.	"Hospital Attack"	3:14
15.	"Shorthand"	0:57
16.	"The Epstein Files"	0:45
17.	"What Are You Waiting For?"	0:55
18.	"Stabway"	1:30
19.	"Welcome to Act 3, Bitches"	1:50
20.	"Cindy to the Rescue"	1:54
21.	"Clearing the House"	1:14
22.	"Ghostface Fight"	1:24
23.	"The Big Twist"	3:00
24.	"Black on Very Black Crime"	2:06
25.	"Finale"	0:47
26.	"Brosferatu"	0:54
27.	"Ray and Brenda (Bonus Track)"	1:37
28.	"Doofy and Gail (Alt Version)"	1:05
29.	"Scary Movie Suite"	3:37
Total length:		46:27

Commercial songs from the film, but not on the soundtrack

- "Hoes" by Lizzo featuring Sexyy Red
- "Kiss or Kill" by Stela Cole
- "Brand New", by Aliyah's Interlude
- "Still Outside", by Big Boss Vette
- "Movin' On Up (The Jeffersons Theme)", by Jeff Barry & Ja'net Dubois
- "Bigger Than Ever (We Back)", by Chris Patrick

== Release ==
=== Theatrical ===
Scary Movie premiered on June 3, 2026, at the Paramount Theatre in Los Angeles, and was released theatrically in the United States on June 5, 2026, by Paramount Pictures, under its first-look deal with Miramax. The film was originally scheduled to be released on June 12, but was moved up a week in March 2026 due to the positive reception of the teaser trailer following an Instagram post provided by Marlon.

=== Home media ===
In July 2026, Paramount Home Entertainment announced that Scary Movie would be released on digital platforms on July 21, 2026, along with an extended version of the film that includes 13 minutes of previously unseen footage and an alternate ending. It began streaming on Paramount+ on September 3, 2026.

== Reception ==
=== Box office ===
Scary Movie grossed $108.3 million in the United States and Canada, and $123.6 million in other territories, for a worldwide total of $231.9 million.

In the United States and Canada, Scary Movie was released alongside Masters of the Universe, and was projected to gross $45–50 million from 3,490 theaters in its opening weekend. The film made $24.8 million on its first day, including $7.7 million in previews. It went on to debut to $54.3 million, topping the box office and marking the highest opening weekend of the franchise.

=== Critical response ===
On the review aggregator website Rotten Tomatoes, 23% of 135 critics' reviews are positive, with an average rating of 4.1/10. The website's consensus reads: "Taking a stab at modern horror movies and missing more than it cuts, Scary Movie's self-referential callbacks and tired gags make for a stunted return to what was already a hit-or-miss franchise." Metacritic, which uses a weighted average, assigned the film a score of 38 out of 100, based on 27 critics, indicating "generally unfavorable" reviews. Audiences polled by CinemaScore gave the film an average grade of "C+" on an A+ to F scale, while 63% of those polled by PostTrak said they would "definitely recommend" it.

Owen Gleiberman of Variety criticized the selection of films chosen to parody, suggesting that titles such as Midsommar and entries in the The Conjuring franchise would have provided stronger material. He wrote, "The majority of the jokes come off as more asserted than delighted. And maybe that's because the film doesn't feel like it's discovering anything new about what's happening between the lines of the Scream genre". David Rooney of The Hollywood Reporter thought the opening scene was the highlight of the film, "but it's pretty much downhill from there". He ended his review with, "This 'rebootiquel', as one of the characters refers to it, needs fresh inspiration and not just a lazy retread of the same old meta contortions if it's to have a life much beyond its opening weekend".

Jesse Hassenger of The Guardian rated the film two stars out of five, calling the jokes "thin on the ground" and that it "should have stayed in the 2000s". Writing for Empire, Kim Newman gave it a score of two out of five. He wrote "The last ten minutes before the extended end-credits almost start to be funny, playing on tension between the cast holdovers from the first Scary Movie and the younger generation—but it's a long haul to get there". Alison Foreman of IndieWire gave it a C+ grade, praising Faris and Hall but writing that the film "manages to come across as thoughtless and toothless at the same time." Richard Roeper for RogerEbert.com gave the film 2 out of 4 stars, criticizing the choice of films it parodied and suggesting it should have primarily parodied modern horror movies such as Get Out, Sinners, and Weapons. Roeper praised the twist ending.

=== Accolades ===
Accolades received by Scary Movie
Award	Date of ceremony	Category	Recipient(s)	Result	Ref(s).
Fangoria Chainsaw Awards	October 25, 2026	Best Supporting Performance	Regina Hall	Nominated	
Queerties Awards	March 10, 2026	Next Big Thing	Scary Movie	Nominated	
