= Major Payne =

- Theatrical release poster
- Directed by: Nick Castle
- Screenplay by: Dean Lorey; Gary Rosen; Damon Wayans
- Based on: The Private War of Major Benson by: Joe Connelly; Bob Mosher; William Roberts; Richard Alan Simmons
- Produced by: Eric L. Gold; Michael Rachmil
- Starring: Damon Wayans; Karyn Parsons; Michael Ironside
- Cinematography: Richard Bowen
- Edited by: Patrick Kennedy
- Music by: Craig Safan
- Production company: Wife 'n Kids Productions
- Distributed by: Universal Pictures
- Release date: March 24, 1995
- Running time: 95 minutes
- Country: United States
- Languages: English; Spanish; Vietnamese
- Box office: $30.1 million

Major Payne is a 1995 American military comedy film directed by Nick Castle and starring Damon Wayans, who wrote with Dean Lorey and Gary Rosen. The film co-stars Karyn Parsons, Steven Martini, and Michael Ironside. It is a loose remake of the 1955 film The Private War of Major Benson, starring Charlton Heston. Major Payne was released in the United States on March 24 and grossed $30 million. Wayans plays a hardened military officer who, after being discharged, attempts to lead a dysfunctional group of youth cadets to victory in a competition.

== Plot ==
Major Benson Winifred Payne, a battle-hardened Force Recon Marine, Vietnam War and Persian Gulf veteran, returns from a successful drug raid in South America to find out that he has been passed over for promotion to Lieutenant Colonel. Payne receives an honorable discharge and tries to adjust to civilian life applying to become a police officer but ends up being arrested during the process. His former commander gets him out of jail and secures him a position back in the military.

Payne is sent to Madison Preparatory Academy in Virginia and is given command of the JROTC students. The cadets are a disorderly group of delinquents and outcasts who have placed last in the Virginia Military Games for eight straight years. Payne immediately takes a hard stance with the cadets and asserts his authority. He shaves the cadets bald and moves them out of their dorms and into a dilapidated barracks, excluding Tiger and Leland, the two youngest cadets who were relocated to the ROTC building. Payne's harsh punishments and lack of empathy for the cadets lead to friction with school counselor Emily Walburn, who tries to soften Payne's approach.

Sickened with the training and encouraged by the rebellious leader Alex Stone, the cadets make several attempts to sabotage Payne and drive him out of the school, via laxative cupcake and attempting to frame him for pedophilia. The final scheme they attempt is hiring a biker to assault Payne, and after a brief confrontation, he defeats the biker. After Alex claims sole responsibility in order to save the other cadets, Payne demotes cadet Dotson and makes Alex the squad leader, recognizing his leadership and willingness to sacrifice for his team. Things come to a head, and Payne offers to quit if the cadets acquire the Military Games trophy from Wellington Academy. Dotson refuses to go on the mission, angry about the demotion and telling the cadets he’s contacted his father to have him transferred, and the boys refused to let Tiger tag along due to his youth and size. When the boys attempt to steal the trophy, Payne tips off the Wellington cadets, who drive the Madison cadets away. Meanwhile, Payne and Emily go out to dinner, dancing, and share a kiss after Payne gifts her a bullet taken from his heart. As Parents Day approaches, Payne defends Alex from his abusive drunken stepfather, earning his gratitude and respect. The cadets realize they must earn the trophy honestly, and practice diligently for the Military Games. They develop into a unified squad, and Payne tells them that they have graduated from the program and are fit to compete in the games.

Before the games, Payne is asked to return to the Marines to fight in Bosnia under the rank he was passed over for promotion. He eagerly accepts the new posting, but his deployment means he will miss the Military Games. As Payne waits for a train to depart, he daydreams about being in a family with Emily and Tiger. The cadets don't want to participate in the Games without Payne, but Alex convinces them to do it, taking the role of leader. At the games, the boys hold their own until Dotson, who transferred to Wellington, intentionally trips Alex in the foot race in retaliation for the demotion. Alex injures his ankle as a result, making him unable to participate in the final event, but manages to cross the finish line, giving the Madison boys a chance to qualify. As revenge for Dotson's dirty move, Cadet Williams knocks Dotson out, instigating a rumble between the Madison cadets and the Wellington cadets. The fight is broken up, and the judges chose to disqualify Williams from the finals.

Payne refuses his new posting and commission and shows up at the last minute. He smooths things over with the judges and tells Tiger to replace Alex as squad leader in the drill competition, as he has watched the group and knows the drill in entirety. The group executes an unorthodox but entertaining routine which wins them the trophy. On the first day of the new school year, Madison displays the Military Games trophy, along with Alex’s individual achievement trophy. Payne resumes being an instructor, having married Emily and adopted Tiger. Stone resumes his role as a squad leader, as Tiger becomes assistant squad leader. Payne has softened a bit, saying he will be a positive leader while instilling discipline. When a disrespectful blind cadet shows up with his service dog, Payne reasserts his dominance by shaving both him and his dog bald with his field knife and laughs.

== Cast ==
- Damon Wayans as Major Benson Winifred Payne, a battle-hardened Marine. Payne has difficulty adjusting to life outside the military.
- Karyn Parsons as Emily Walburn, the school counselor. She and Payne clash over his style of training the cadets.
- William Hickey as Dr. Phillips, the headmaster of the school. He appears to be mainly focused on academia, not bothered by his school's dismal record in the Military Games. His only orders to Payne are that he keep the cadets from causing trouble around the school.
- Steven Martini as Cadet Alexander "Alex" J. Stone, a rebellious teenager with no respect for authority. He opposes Payne's hardline approach to training and actively works to get rid of Payne, yet ends up being cadet squad leader in place of Dotson.
- Michael Ironside as Lieutenant Colonel Stone, Alex's stepfather, an alcoholic who abuses Alex. (NOTE: all but one of Ironside's scenes were cut from the movie, despite his co-starring credit.)
- Orlando Brown as Cadet Kevin "Tiger" Dunn, an orphan adopted by the school and raised by Emily Walburn. The youngest of the cadets, he struggles to keep up with the others and find his place.
- Albert Hall as General Elias Decker, Payne's former commanding officer.
- Andrew Harrison Leeds as Cadet Dotson, a brown-noser who was a cadet squad leader for Madison prep JROTC. Dotson transfers to Wellington after being demoted in favor of Cadet Alex Stone.
- Damien Dante Wayans (Damon's real-life nephew) as Cadet Dwight "D" Williams
- Chris Owen as Cadet Wuliger, a hypochondriac.
- Joseph Blaire as Cadet Bryan
- Stephen Coleman as Cadet Leland, the second youngest cadet in the squad, wears black-rimmed glasses.
- Mark Madison as Cadet Fox, a deaf cadet who can sign and read lips.
- Peyton Chesson-Fohl as Cadet Sergeant Johnson
- Bam Bam Bigelow as Biker. He is hired by the cadets to confront Payne and intimidate him into leaving.
- R. Stephen Wiles as Cadet Heathcoat, the overweight cadet.
- R. J. Knoll as Blind New Cadet

== Production ==
Major Payne was filmed at the Miller School of Albemarle in Charlottesville, Virginia.

== Reception ==
Review aggregator Rotten Tomatoes gave the film an approval rating of 29% based on 14 reviews. Metacritic, which uses a weighted average, assigned the film a score of 34 out of 100, based on 18 critics, indicating "generally unfavorable" reviews. Kevin Thomas of the Los Angeles Times wrote, "While Major Payne is too predictable for most adults, it's an ideal entertainment for youthful audiences that allows Damon Wayans to be at his best in a dream part." Caryn James of The New York Times wrote, "Though the movie is rarely more clever than its title, Mr. Wayans gives the dark cartoonish comedy an irreverent edge."

Roger Ebert of the Chicago Sun-Times rated it three out of four stars and called it a smart and funny satire of military films:

The key to this kind of comedy is to go all the way with it, and Wayans creates a comic character out of narrowness, obsession, and blind commitment. Of course the arc of the storyline is familiar; we know the pretty teacher will soften him, and that he will grow fond of the cadets, and no prizes for guessing who wins the big all-Virginia ROTC [sic] competition... Wayans is one of the most talented comic actors around, especially when he lets go and swings for the fences.

=== Box office ===
The film debuted at number 2 at the US box office behind Outbreak with a gross of $7 million on its opening weekend. Major Payne went on to gross $30.1 million worldwide.
