= Marlon (TV series) =

American television sitcom (2017–2018)

- Genre: Sitcom
- Created by: Christopher Moynihan; Marlon Wayans
- Starring: Marlon Wayans; Essence Atkins; Notlim Taylor; Amir O'Neil; Bresha Webb; Diallo Riddle
- Composer: Dwayne Wayans
- Country of origin: United States
- Original language: English
- No. of seasons: 2
- No. of episodes: 20

Production
- Executive producers: Marlon Wayans; Rick Alvarez; Christopher Moynihan; Michael Rotenberg; Andy Ackerman
- Camera setup: Multi-camera
- Running time: 22 minutes
- Production companies: Bicycle Path Productions; Baby Way Productions; 3 Arts Entertainment; Universal Television

Original release
- Network: NBC
- Release: August 16, 2017 – July 12, 2018

Marlon is an American television sitcom that stars Marlon Wayans, Essence Atkins, Notlim Taylor, Amir O'Neil, Bresha Webb, and Diallo Riddle. On May 13, 2016, it was ordered to series. The series premiered on August 16, 2017, on NBC.

On September 28, 2017, NBC renewed the series for a second season, which aired from June 14 to July 12, 2018. On December 21, 2018, NBC canceled the series after two seasons.

In 2018, Netflix acquired exclusive distribution of Marlon in many regions around the world, including the United Kingdom. Outside of the US, Marlon is advertised as a "Netflix Original".

== Premise ==
Despite their inability to coexist, divorced couple Marlon Wayne and his ex-wife Ashley try to stay friends for the sake of their two children, Marley and Zack.

The premise of the show is loosely based on star Marlon Wayans' own life.

== Characters ==
- Marlon Wayans as Marlon Wayne– A loving but often inappropriate divorced father of two, Marlon often acts the most childish of the house and is therefore the more youth-relatable parent. The typical clingy ex, Marlon is always doing things out of the ordinary. Deep down he loves his family, he just has an odd way of showing it.
- Essence Atkins as Ashley Wayne – Always keeping things calm in the house, Ashley is usually the peacemaker in the family and has to get things back to normal after Marlon hypes things up. Ashley is trying to move on from the divorce but things are complicated.
- Notlim Taylor as Marley Wayne – Marley is the calm one in the family. She is very intelligent and responsible, and rarely ever gets in trouble. She's a quick-thinker and a role-model.
- Amir O'Neil as Zack Wayne – Zack is the troublesome kid in the family and always makes a mess in the house. He doesn't really care about feelings or emotions because he is usually busy being silly and air-headed.
- Bresha Webb as Yvette Brown – Ashley's best friend who is often busy trying to find the right guy. Yvette is a God-loving woman with a packed past, of which Marlon always tries his best to make fun. She has a petty feud with him and they're always going back and forth.
- Diallo Riddle as Stephandre Jamal “Stevie” Noggle – Stevie took it upon himself to shack up in Marlon's apartment, much to Marlon's annoyance. Despite being well-educated, he is perpetually unemployed. He considers himself Marlon's best friend, and even though Marlon disagrees with this, Stevie is arguably his only friend. Stevie has an unrequited crush on Yvette, that the latter will sometimes use to her advantage such as getting free stuff or using Stevie to make other men jealous. Needless to say, it always backfires on the both of them.

== Episodes ==
Season	Episodes	Originally released	
Season	Episodes	First released	Last released
1	10	August 16, 2017	September 13, 2017
2	10	June 14, 2018	July 12, 2018

=== Season 1 (2017) ===
No. overall	No. in season	Title	Directed by	Written by	Original release date	U.S. viewers (millions)
1	1	"Pilot"	Andy Ackerman	Story by : Christopher Moynihan & Marlon Wayans; Teleplay by : Christopher Moynihan	August 16, 2017	5.27
Internet star Marlon Wayne (Marlon Wayans) and ex-wife Ashley (Essence Atkins) try to become friends for their kids' sake following their divorce. Ashley's friend Yvette (Bresha Webb) tries to set her up on her first date since the split, which makes Marlon jealous. Meanwhile, Marley encounters a bully at school and gets questionable advice from Dad on how to handle it.
2	2	"Cleaning Out The Closet"	Robbie Countryman	Craig Wayans & Mitchell Marchand	August 16, 2017	4.05
Ashley receives news that she is being evicted from the storage facility that she and Marlon share, but discovers that Marlon had not cleaned it out following their divorce. Ashley, Yvette and Stevie (Diallo Riddle) think Marlon is becoming a hoarder, and hold an intervention for him.
3	3	"Boys Only Want One Thing"	Phill Lewis	Ric Swartzlander	August 23, 2017	4.59
Marlon becomes an overprotective father when Marley brings home Eugene (Christopher Meyer), a handsome 15-year old football player, for a study date. Despite Ashley's advice to stay out of it, Marlon suspects that Eugene is just playing on Marley's affections to help him pass a geometry test, and that he will break her heart after. Marley kicks him out of the house due to his intervening, but Ashley discovers Marlon was right after Eugene hits on her. Together, the parents both throw Eugene out of the house, but Eugene leaves with the answers to the test. However, right after he leaves, Marley reveals she was aware of his deceit and the answers she gave him were wrong, thus insuring his failure of the test, and reconciles with her parents.
4	4	"Exes with Benefits"	Eric Dean Seaton	Teri Schaffer & Raynelle Swilling	August 23, 2017	3.68
During a game of "Have You Ever...", it's revealed that Marlon and Ashley have never had sex since their divorce, which surprises Yvette. Ashley thinks it might be fun to try, but Stevie warns Marlon that it could rekindle Ashley's desire for a relationship. On the night of the hookup, Marlon realizes he didn't consider how this could affect his own feelings.
5	5	"Project Kids"	Phill Lewis	Craig Wayans & Mitchell Marchand	August 30, 2017	5.12
Ashley shows Marlon their kids high priced phone and Internet bills. Fearing that they don't appreciate what they have, Marlon tries to teach the kids his "old school" ways by making them live like he did while growing up in the projects.
6	6	"Surprises"	Eric Dean Seaton	Britt Matt & Julian Kiani	August 30, 2017	3.84
After Ashley insists she doesn't want a surprise party for her 40th birthday, she reveals she wants to have breast augmentation surgery, causing Marlon to try and talk her out of it. Meanwhile, Stevie begins to torment Yvette about guessing her age.
7	7	"Hospital Party"	Robbie Countryman	Regina Hicks	September 6, 2017	4.98
When Zack prepares for minor surgery, Marlon and Ashley have polar opposite ways to help him cope with it. Ashley begins to get annoyed with Marlon when he goes over the top.
8	8	"Coach Marlon"	Phill Lewis	Teri Schaffer & Raynelle Swilling	September 6, 2017	3.57
During Zack's basketball game, Marlon tries psychological tactics to cover for the fact that his team isn't very talented, but this backfires. Meanwhile, Ashley determines that Marlon does not respect boundaries when she finds out that he's been sleeping at her house instead of his, and she revokes his house key.
9	9	"Appropriate Marlon"	Phill Lewis	Ryan Noggle	September 13, 2017	4.89
Marlon believes he can act appropriately to help Ashley get into a social club that prefers couples. Stevie fits in perfectly among the bourgeois clients at the club, which surprises Yvette.
10	10	"End of the Road"	Andrew D. Weyman	Aseem Batra	September 13, 2017	3.63
Ashley is perplexed when Marlon still wants to celebrate the anniversary of their first date, even after their divorce. After some arguing, the two mutually agree that they should make the date a celebration of their family. Special Guests: Boyz II Men

=== Season 2 (2018) ===
No. overall	No. in season	Title	Directed by	Written by	Original release date	U.S. viewers (millions)
11	1	"Model Parent"	Robbie Countryman	Ryan Noggle	June 14, 2018	2.93
Marlon and Ashley agree for Zack to be a spokesmodel for a kids athletic clothing line. Later on, they are shocked to discover that the photos they took contain a racist phrase on Zack's shirt and are forced to pull the ad.
12	2	"Wingman"	Kevin Charles Sullivan	Mitchell Marchand	June 14, 2018	2.39
After Ashley has a bad night at a nightclub, Marlon offers to be her wingman on her next trip to the club. While Marlon is successful and sets up Ashley with a handsome guy, she still gets jealous when she sees Marlon connecting with another woman. Meanwhile, Yvette uses Stevie in order to make her ex-boyfriend jealous.
13	3	"Sisters"	Phill Lewis	Teri Schaffer & Raynelle Swilling	June 21, 2018	2.81
When Marlon’s two sisters (Kym Whitley and Sherri Shepherd) come to visit, he asks Ashley to pretend they are still married because he fears his sisters would be disappointed if they know he is divorced.
14	4	"Divorce Counseling"	Phill Lewis	Britt Matt	June 21, 2018	2.41
Ashley asks Marlon to go to divorce counseling, fearing that they are reverting to the old habits that led to their divorce in the first place. Meanwhile, Stevie announces he wants to be a massage therapist. Yvette is skeptical until Stevie gives her an intense foot massage.
15	5	"Keepin' It 100"	Robbie Countryman	Ric Swartzlander	June 28, 2018	2.89
Ashley takes it upon herself to redecorate Marlon's apartment, much to his dismay. He suggests that now that he and Ashley are divorced, they should "keep it 100" and be completely honest with each other. But when Marlon hosts a party in his house to woo the landlords into selling the property to him, his and Ashley's 100% honesty causes problems.
16	6	"Man Code"	Jean Sagal	Craig Wayans	June 28, 2018	2.43
Ashley turns to various hobbies now that her best friend Yvette has begun dating former boyfriend Demetrius again. Meanwhile, Marlon and Stevie choose not to violate the man code when they see Demetrius kissing another woman at an L.A. Lakers game. Things change, however, when Yvette announces that Demetrius proposed to her.
17	7	"Homecoming"	Robbie Countryman	Kenny Smith	July 5, 2018	2.96
During homecoming week, Marlon and Stevie visit the college where they met. Stevie becomes deeply hurt when he learns that Marlon was one of the people who voted to keep him out of a fraternity. Meanwhile, Ashley and Yvette are determined to relive their youth and meet some guys, but they instead become the target of a prank wherein young college men try to land "cougars".
18	8	"Driving Miss Marley"	Robbie Countryman	Julian Kiani	July 5, 2018	2.33
The family is at odds when 16-year old Marley seems to have no interest in driving. Marlon insists that it's time for Marley to learn, while Ashley admits that she likes driving Marley around because it's one of the few opportunities they have to bond anymore. Meanwhile, Yvette is taken aback by her low Uber rating, so she asks Stevie to teach her how to be a better passenger.
19	9	"Career Day"	Beth McCarthy-Miller	Raynelle Swilling & Teri Schaffer	July 12, 2018	2.91
On Zack's career day, Ashley and Yvette do a presentation on the design business, then Marlon follows with an over-the-top presentation on non-traditional careers. This backfires when numerous parents gather at Ashley's house to complain that their kids have ditched their original career choices to do something "fun" like Marlon does.
20	10	"Funeral Party"	Eric Dean Seaton	Sydney Castillo	July 12, 2018	2.38
Marlon is disappointed when his family members all have something "better" to do on the day of his birthday. Feeling unappreciated, he is inspired by a friend's funeral to hold a "funeral party" for himself, forcing people to say nice things about him while he's still alive. Unfortunately, the family, Stevie and Yvette misinterpret Marlon's intentions, and they use the opportunity to roast him with humorous insults instead.

== Reception ==
=== Critical response ===
The review aggregator website Rotten Tomatoes reported a 50% approval rating with an average rating of 5.3/10 based on 10 reviews. The website's critical consensus reads, "Marlon Wayans is an engaging comedian and performer, but his energetic brand of mischievous humor is ill-served by the conventionality of this square sitcom". Metacritic, which uses a weighted average, assigned a score of 55 out of 100 based on 6 critics, indicating "mixed or average reviews".

=== Ratings ===
==== Overall ====
Viewership and ratings per season of Marlon
Season	Timeslot (ET)	Episodes	First aired		Last aired		TV season	Viewership rank	Avg. viewers (millions)
Season	Timeslot (ET)	Episodes	Date	Viewers (millions)	Date	Viewers (millions)	TV season	Viewership rank	Avg. viewers (millions)
1	Wednesday 9:00 p.m. (1, 3, 5, 7, 9); Wednesday 9:30 p.m. (2, 4, 6, 8, 10)	10	August 16, 2017	5.27	September 13, 2017	3.63	2016–17	TBD	TBD
2	Thursday 9:00 p.m. (1, 3, 5, 7, 9); Thursday 9:30 p.m. (2, 4, 6, 8, 10)	10	June 14, 2018	2.93	July 12, 2018	2.38	2017–18	TBD	TBD

==== Season 1 ====
Viewership and ratings per episode of Marlon
No.	Title	Air date	Rating/share (18–49)	Viewers (millions)
1	"Pilot"	August 16, 2017	1.3/5	5.28
2	"Cleaning Out The Closet"	August 16, 2017	1.0/4	4.05
3	"Boys Only Want One Thing"	August 23, 2017	1.1/5	4.59
4	"Exes with Benefits"	August 23, 2017	1.0/4	3.68
5	"Project Kids"	August 30, 2017	1.1/5	5.12
6	"Surprises"	August 30, 2017	0.9/4	3.84
7	"Hospital Party"	September 6, 2017	1.2/5	4.98
8	"Coach Marlon"	September 6, 2017	0.9/4	3.57
9	"Appropriate Marlon"	September 13, 2017	1.2/5	4.89
10	"End of the Road"	September 13, 2017	1.0/4	3.63

==== Season 2 ====
Viewership and ratings per episode of Marlon
No.	Title	Air date	Rating/share (18–49)	Viewers (millions)	DVR (18–49)	DVR viewers (millions)	Total (18–49)	Total viewers (millions)
1	"Model Parent"	June 14, 2018	0.7/3	2.93	0.2	0.58	0.9	3.51
2	"Wingman"	June 14, 2018	0.6/3	2.39	0.2	0.57	0.8	2.95
3	"Sisters"	June 21, 2018	0.6/3	2.81	0.2	0.56	0.8	3.36
4	"Divorce Counseling"	June 21, 2018	0.6/3	2.41	0.2	0.59	0.8	3.00
5	"Keeping' It 100"	June 28, 2018	0.6/3	2.89	0.2	0.56	0.8	3.45
6	"Man Code"	June 28, 2018	0.6/3	2.43	0.2	0.62	0.8	3.05
7	"Homecoming"	July 5, 2018	0.6/3	2.96	0.2	0.45	0.8	3.41
8	"Driving Miss Marley"	July 5, 2018	0.6/3	2.33	0.2	0.52	0.8	2.85
9	"Career Day"	July 12, 2018	0.6/3	2.91	0.2	0.58	0.8	3.48
10	"Funeral Party"	July 12, 2018	0.6/3	2.38	0.3	0.67	0.9	3.04

=== Accolades ===
Year	Award	Category	Nominee	Result	Ref.
2018	NAMIC Vision Awards	Comedy	Marlon	Nominated	
2018	Young Artist Awards	Best Performance in a TV Series — Supporting Young Actor	Amir O'Neil	Nominated	
2018	Young Artist Awards	Best Performance in a TV Series — Supporting Teen Actress	Notlim Taylor	Nominated	
2019	NAACP Image Awards	Outstanding Supporting Actress in a Comedy Series	Essence Atkins	Nominated	
