= Dwayne Wayans =

American writer and film score composer

- Born: Dwayne Howell Otis Wayans; August 22, 1956 (age 69); New York City, New York, U.S.
- Genres: Film score
- Occupation: Writer/Composer

Dwayne Howell Otis Wayans (born August 22, 1956) is an American film and television composer, and member of the Wayans family.

== Early life ==
Wayans was born in New York City, the first child of Elvira Alethia (née Green; July 23, 1938–July 10, 2020), a homemaker and social worker, and Howell Stouten Wayans (August 26, 1936–April 1, 2023) a supermarket manager. His family were Jehovah's Witnesses. He and his family lived in New York's Chelsea neighborhood. He is the eldest sibling of Keenen, Diedra, Damon Sr., Kimberly, Elvira, Nadia, Devonne, Shawn, and Marlon.

== Career ==
He worked as production assistant and performed as background characters in sketches on the show of Keenen Ivory Wayans (In Living Color).

== Filmography ==
- In Living Color (1990–1991)
