= Don't Be a Menace to South Central While Drinking Your Juice in the Hood =

1996 film directed by Paris Barclay

- Theatrical release poster
- Directed by: Paris Barclay
- Written by: Shawn Wayans; Marlon Wayans; Phil Beauman
- Produced by: Keenen Ivory Wayans; Eric L. Gold
- Starring: Shawn Wayans; Marlon Wayans
- Cinematography: Russ Brandt
- Edited by: Marshall Harvey; William Young
- Music by: John Barnes
- Production companies: Island Pictures; Ivory Way Productions
- Distributed by: Miramax Films
- Release date: January 12, 1996
- Running time: 89 minutes
- Country: United States
- Language: English
- Budget: $3.8 million
- Box office: $20.1 million

Don't Be a Menace to South Central While Drinking Your Juice in the Hood (or simply as Don't Be a Menace) is a 1996 American hood comedy film directed by Paris Barclay in his feature directorial debut, written by and starring Shawn Wayans and Marlon Wayans along with contributions by Phil Beauman. In the film, two cousins explore the surreal, comedic world of South Central Los Angeles.

Don't Be a Menace spoofs several 1990s hood films, notably Menace II Society (1993), South Central, Juice (both 1992), and Boyz n the Hood (1991). It features cameos by actors from those films, often parodying their original roles. Produced by Keenen Ivory Wayans, it is the Wayans' second film to parody black film culture and African-American society, after I'm Gonna Git You Sucka (1988).

Don't Be a Menace was theatrically released in the United States on January 12, 1996, by Miramax Films. It received mixed reviews from critics and has gained a cult following. The film grossed $20.1 million worldwide.

== Plot ==
Ashtray, Tray for short, is sent to the inner city to live with his father. Tray gets an education about life on the streets from his psychotic, gun-toting cousin Loc Dog, pot-smoking, foul-mouthed Grandma, underage father, and gang members Preach and Crazy Legs. At a picnic, Tray falls for the infamous Dashiki, who has seven kids, much to the distaste of ex-convict Toothpick, who happens to be her ex-boyfriend. When Ashtray and Loc Dog head out to buy some snacks, Toothpick and his crew, Al Dog and Sam, confront Ashtray and hold him at gunpoint until Loc Dog threatens them with a Soviet nuclear missile mounted in the back of his truck, whereupon Toothpick and his gang flee the scene.

Loc Dog and Ashtray are harassed by the store owners in a Korean store, and Loc Dog shoots at them when they make a remark about his mother. The two are then confronted by "The Man" (a mysterious white government figure), who kills the Koreans and tosses them his gun to frame them, and leaves.

Meanwhile, Ashtray and Loc Dog's Grandma rides to church, and another elderly woman disses her, resulting in a breakdancing contest that Grandma wins.

Ashtray visits Dashiki, and they have sex. Dashiki immediately claims he has impregnated her. Not feeling Ashtray is responsible enough to be a father, Dashiki kicks him out. Meanwhile, Toothpick and Al Dog jump a new member into their gang by doing Double Dutch jump rope. Afterward, Sam confronts Ashtray, Loc Dog, Preach, and Crazy Legs about Ashtray impregnating Dashiki. Loc Dog knocks him out as he, Ashtray, and Preach punch and stomp him, flattening him (literally). The quartet decides to get protection from their friend Old School, who advises them to protect themselves and watch out for each other, until his mother walks out and tells him to clean his bedroom.

Moments later, Toothpick performs a drive-by shooting in revenge for Sam's beating, and Crazy Legs is injured. With Crazy Legs hospitalized, Tray decides to confront Dashiki and become a father to their newborn baby. Dashiki agrees to give Tray another chance, and they decide to leave the 'hood as planned.

Ashtray then reads a bedtime story to his Pops (who is too young to go to a party), which causes him to ejaculate before going to sleep. At the party, Loc Dog meets Keisha, whom he then takes to his mail truck for drinks and sex, during which Keisha turns into a demonic monster and attacks Loc Dog, stripping him naked while he tries to run away screaming.

Ashtray and Loc Dog talk about Ashtray's departure as Toothpick and his gang prepare for another drive-by shooting. As Toothpick and Loc Dog clash, Ashtray is shot. As Loc Dog and Toothpick's gang continue to exchange gunfire, Grandma pops out of the dumpster and helps Loc Dog shoot at Toothpick's car, with both of them shooting at Al Dog and Sam, then flattening a tire, causing Toothpick to be flung from the car, landing on a cop car. Preach and Dashiki find Ashtray hurt, and he regains consciousness and kisses Dashiki. A woman finds Toothpick (she turns out to be his mother) and beats him with his shoe for stealing from her in the past. Afterward, Toothpick and his gang are presumably arrested.

Afterwards, everyone goes their separate ways: Ashtray and Dashiki marry and enjoy their lives, Loc Dog becomes the host of Death Comedy Jam (a parody of Def Comedy Jam) and opens and closes the show with extreme profanity, Preach and his crush settle down together, Crazy Legs becomes a dancer, and Grandma is, as Ashtray puts it, "still Grandma" (showing her smoking cannabis).

== Cast ==
- Shawn Wayans as Ashtray
- Vivica A. Fox as Ashtray's mother
- Lahmard Tate as Ashtray's father
- Marlon Wayans as Loc Dog
- Helen Martin as Grandma
- Chris Spencer as Preach
- Suli McCullough as Crazy Legs
- Tracey Cherelle Jones as Dashiki
- Isaiah Barnes as Doo Rag
- Darrell Heath as Toothpick
- Antonio Fargas as Old School
- Bernie Mac as Officer Self Hatred
- Terri J. Vaughn as Keisha
- Benjamin N. Everitt as The Man
- Keith Morris as Dave the Crackhead
- Keenen Ivory Wayans as The Mailman
- Omar Epps as Malik
- Lawanda Page as Old School's mother
- Guy Torry as Doo-Rag's father

== Reception ==
=== Box office ===
Don't Be a Menace to South Central While Drinking Your Juice in The Hood collected $8,112,884 from 1,010 theaters its opening weekend, opening at #2 at the box office, averaging $8,032 per theater. By the end of its theatrical run, the film domestically grossed $20,109,115.

=== Critical response ===
Rotten Tomatoes gives the film a score of 32% based on 28 reviews, with an average rating of 4.70/10. Metacritic gave the film a score of 53 out of 100, based on reviews from 16 critics, indicating "mixed or average" reviews.

Chris Hicks of the Deseret News wrote the film has some laughs, "but too many gags fall flat, or are cheap and sleazy instead of clever and witty. Too often, the Wayanses (who also co-wrote the script) make fun of women's physical attributes, mock the handicapped, put a gun to someone's head or have an elderly woman cuss and smoke pot, as if they [are] inherently hilarious. And then the same jokes are repeated in a slightly varied form."

Siskel & Ebert had sharply different perceptions on their syndicated TV show. Roger Ebert gave Don't Be a Menace a "thumbs down" review, saying it had a few very funny scenes, but he was bothered by the satire of well-made, serious films which attempted to say something important. Ebert also believed some of the jokes based on stereotypes about African-Americans would be seen as racist if made by a white director. Gene Siskel gave the film a more positive "thumbs up" and felt it was a highly effective comedy.

Godfrey Cheshire of Variety said the film has a "genial and capable cast", and is "spirited and hilarious in odd moments", but "it hardly expands on In Living Color and other Wayans precedents, and compared with a genuinely satiric film like Rusty Cundieff's Fear of a Black Hat, it's simple parody, with little in the way of ironic commentary or real invention."

Stephen Holden of The New York Times wrote "the film's most inflammatory comic bit [is when] the suspicious owners of a Korean grocery store trail Ashtray and Loc Dog through the aisles while a white customer casually steals a sack full of items and empties the cash register. On returning to his counter, the owner calls out to the departing robber, 'You forgot something,' and hands over the last remaining bills."

Bruce Fretts of Entertainment Weekly said "Don't Be a Menace is at its best when puncturing the preachiness of John Singleton's films (big brother Keenen Ivory Wayans appears in a cameo after each weepy, didactic speech to announce, 'Message!'" and when making pointed jabs about race or culture, but many of the jokes feel "too dopey."

The film has since gained a cult following.

== Soundtrack ==
The soundtrack album was released on January 9, 1996, via Island Records, and consisted of hip hop and R&B music. The album peaked at number 18 on the Billboard 200, number 3 on the Top R&B/Hip-Hop Albums, and was certified Gold by the Recording Industry Association of America on March 14, 1996, for selling 500,000 copies in the United States.

It spawned five singles: The Island Inspirational All-Stars' gospel song "Don't Give Up", the Lost Boyz' "Renee" and "Can't Be Wasting My Time", Joe's "All the Things (Your Man Won't Do)", and The Isley Brothers' "Let's Lay Together".

== Home media ==
Buena Vista Home Entertainment (under the Miramax Home Entertainment banner) released the film on VHS on October 22, 1996, with a US LaserDisc release following on November 20, 1996. It then received a DVD release on January 5, 1999. On September 20, 2005 an unrated special edition was also released on DVD.

In December 2010, Miramax was sold by The Walt Disney Company, their owners since 1993. That same month, the studio was taken over by private equity firm Filmyard Holdings. Filmyard licensed the home media rights for lower profile Miramax titles to Echo Bridge Entertainment, with high profile titles being licensed to Lionsgate. Echo Bridge released the film on Blu-ray on July 5, 2011. Echo Bridge also included it on a four film DVD set with three other black-focused Miramax comedies (2005's Underclassman and 1998's Ride and Senseless). This package was titled "Miramax House Party Collection", and was released on August 7, 2012. Filmyard Holdings terminated their home video agreement with Echo Bridge in 2014, and Lionsgate Home Entertainment reissued the four film set on October 7, 2014. On November 25, 2014, Lionsgate also reissued the Blu-ray that was originally released by Echo Bridge. In 2011, Filmyard Holdings licensed the Miramax library to streamer Netflix. This deal included Don't Be a Menace to South Central While Drinking Your Juice in the Hood, and ran for five years, eventually ending on June 1, 2016.

In March 2016, Filmyard Holdings sold Miramax to Qatari company beIN Media Group. Then in April 2020, ViacomCBS (now known as Paramount Skydance) bought a 49% stake in Miramax, which gave them the rights to the Miramax library. Don't Be a Menace to South Central While Drinking Your Juice in the Hood is among the 700 titles they acquired in the deal, and since April 2020, the film has been distributed by Paramount Pictures. On September 22, 2020, Paramount Home Entertainment reissued the film on Blu-ray, with this being one of many Miramax titles that they reissued around this time.

== Possible sequel ==
In February 2026, Marlon Wayans confirmed that a sequel will happen if Scary Movie is successful.

== See also ==
- List of hood films
