= Kim Wayans =

American actress, comedian and director (born 1961)

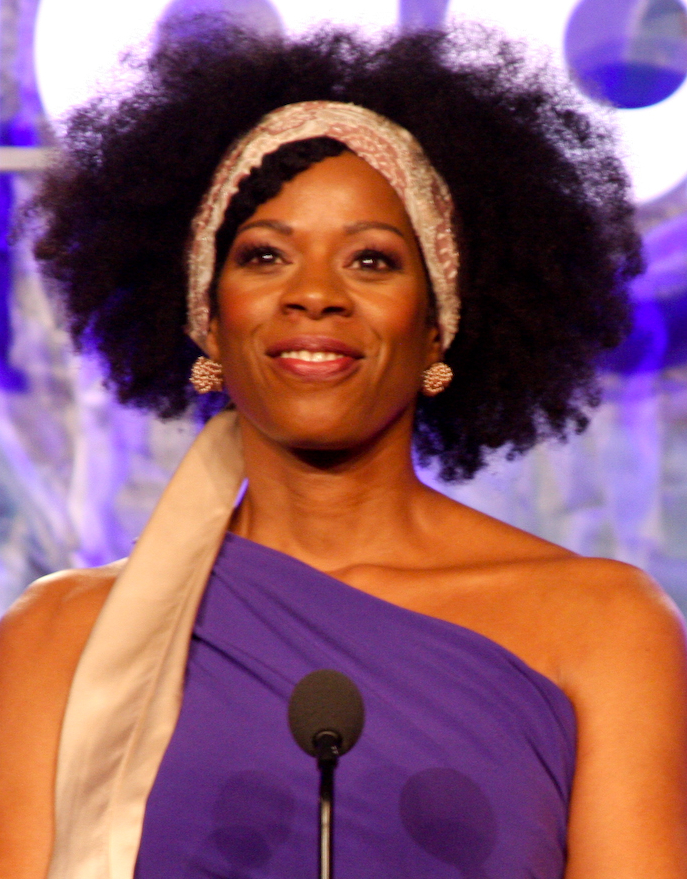
- Wayans in 2012
- Born: Kimberly Nichole Wayans; October 16, 1961 (age 64); New York City, New York, U.S.
- Education: Wesleyan University (BA)
- Occupations: Actress; comedian; television director
- Years active: 1982–present
- Spouse: Kevin Knotts
- Relatives: Keenen Ivory Wayans (brother); Damon Wayans (brother); Shawn Wayans (brother); Marlon Wayans (brother); Damon Wayans Jr. (nephew)
- Family: Wayans family

Kimberly Nichole Wayans (/ˈweɪ.ənz/ WAY-ənz; born October 16, 1961) is an American actress, comedian and director. Having made her television debut as Allison in the first season of The Cosby Show spin-off A Different World, she became known for her numerous roles on the Fox sketch comedy series In Living Color (1990–1993) and as Tonia Harris on the NBC/UPN sitcom In the House (1995–1998). Wayans starred as Audrey in the drama film Pariah, for which she was nominated for two Black Reel Awards and an NAACP Image Award in 2012.

Wayans has directed episodes for television shows such as the sitcoms My Wife and Kids and The Neighborhood as well as the Disney Channel original series Bunk'd and Just Roll with It.

She is the sister of Keenen Ivory Wayans, Damon Wayans, Shawn Wayans and Marlon Wayans, and aunt of Damon Wayans Jr., among others.

== Early life ==
Wayans was born in Harlem, New York City, the daughter of Elvira Alethia (née Green), a homemaker and social worker, and Howell Stouten Wayans, a supermarket manager. One of ten siblings, she and her family lived in Fulton Houses, a housing project in New York City's Chelsea neighborhood, and were Jehovah's Witnesses. Wayans graduated from Wesleyan University, where she studied English.

== Career ==
Wayans made her film debut in Hollywood Shuffle (1987). Her earliest roles on television included a guest appearance on China Beach and as Allison on A Different World during its first season. In film, she portrayed minor characters in I'm Gonna Git You Sucka (1989) and A Low Down Dirty Shame (1994). Both films were directed by her brother Keenen Ivory Wayans.

She starred with her siblings on the Fox variety show In Living Color. Wayans was a part of the cast at its outset in 1990, where she did celebrity impressions of Naomi Campbell, Whitney Houston, Vanessa Williams and Oprah Winfrey.

Regarding original characters, one reviewer opined she was "hysterical" as Mrs. Brooks and another claimed Wayans played Benita Butrell "to perfection." She left the series along with her brothers Keenen Ivory and Damon in 1993, after a dispute between Fox and the three Wayanses regarding reruns and syndication.

In 1996, Wayans joined the cast of sitcom In the House as Tonia. She provided the voice of Mrs. Wayne on short-lived cartoon Waynehead. She appeared as Mrs. Johnson in Don't Be a Menace to South Central While Drinking Your Juice in the Hood (1996), and had a starring role in the art film Talking About Sex. She also appeared in two episodes as Sheila on The Wayans Bros. starring her younger brothers Marlon and Shawn. Wayans co-starred in Juwanna Mann (2002) as basketball player Latisha Jansen.

Wayans then worked as a story editor on her brother Damon's sitcom My Wife and Kids. In 2008, she co wrote a series of children's books with her husband Kevin Knotts, titled Amy Hodgepodge, about a multiracial girl adjusting to life in public school after years of homeschooling.

Known predominantly as a comedian, Wayans claims to have struggled finding roles in other mediums. However, in 2011, she was cast as Audrey, a mother who struggles to understand her seventeen-year-old daughter in the drama film Pariah. According to director Dee Rees, Wayans was chosen in the role as she was the only actress to give Audrey "vulnerability" in her audition. Wayans was nominated for a Black Reel Award and NAACP Image Award in 2012, both in the category of Outstanding Supporting Actress.

Following Pariah, Wayans has acted in more dramatic fare, including guest spots on Criminal Minds and Hawaii Five-0. Her turn on the former led to a regular role as paralegal Vi Briggs on Reckless. She appeared as a doctor on The Soul Man and portrayed Susan on New Girl, appearing in an episode alongside her nephew, Damon Wayans Jr. Wayans returned to sketch comedy, appearing in one episode of A Black Lady Sketch Show in 2021.

In November 2025, it was revealed that she joined the cast of Scary Movie, which is set to release in June 2026. In January 2026, she launched a comedy series on YouTube titled Still Got It with Izzi Fabulous.

== In Living Color ==
=== Impressions ===
- Altovise Davis
- La Toya Jackson
- Esther Rolle
- Crystal Waters
- Grace Jones
- LaWanda Page
- Oprah Winfrey
- Tracy Chapman
- Della Reese
- Lynne Thigpen
- Whitney Houston
- Vanessa L. Williams
- Cree Summer
- Tina Turner
- Sandra "Pepa" Denton
- Telma Hopkins
- Dionne Warwick
- Lucille Ball

=== Characters ===
- Benita Butrell
- Cousin Elsee
- Laquita (I Love Laquita)
- Lil' Magic
- Mrs. Brooks
- Reesie (Cephus & Reesie)

== Filmography ==
=== Film ===
Year	Title	Role	Notes
1987	Hollywood Shuffle	Customer in Chair	
1987	Eddie Murphy Raw	Interviewed Fan	
1988	I'm Gonna Git You Sucka	Nightclub Singer	
1994	Floundering	Unemployment Clerk	
1994	Talking About Sex	Andie Norman	
1994	A Low Down Dirty Shame	Diane	
1996	Don't Be a Menace	Mrs. Johnson	
1997	Critics and Other Freaks	Bettina	
2001	Scary Movie 2	Newswoman	Deleted scenes
2002	Juwanna Mann	Latisha Jansen	
2006	Thugaboo: Sneaker Madness	Momma/Joyce	Voice, television film
2006	Thugaboo: A Miracle on D-Roc's Street	Momma	Voice, television film
2007	What News?	Pearl "Lightning" Davis	Television film
2009	Dance Flick	Ms. Dontwannabebothered	
2011	Pariah	Audrey	
2017	Ray Meets Helen	Lizzie Faye	
2020	Exit Package	Mary Birdsall	Short
2026	Scary Movie	Nurse Ratchett	

=== Television ===
Year	Title	Role	Notes
1987–1988	A Different World	Allison	Recurring cast: season 1
1988	China Beach	Cameo Candette	Episode: "Lost and Found"
1990	Dream On	Nicki	Episode: "Over Your Dead Body"
1990–1993	In Living Color	Herself/Castmember	Main cast: season 1-4
1991	Robert Townsend and His Partners in Crime	Various Characters	TV special Documentary
1995–1998	In the House	Tonia Riley Harris	Main cast: season 2-4
1995–1998	The Wayans Bros.	Shelia	2 episodes
1996–1997	Waynehead	Mom	Voice, main cast
1998	Getting Personal	Rhonda	Episode: "There's Something About Rhonda"
2000	Happily Ever After: Fairy Tales for Every Child	Jackie-In-The-Box / Lulu	Voice, episode: "The Steadfast Tin Soldier"
2000	Cousin Skeeter	Mystic Ruler	Episode: “New Kids on the Planet”
2001–2005	My Wife and Kids	—N/a	Writer, producer, director
2012	Criminal Minds	Darlene Beckett	Episode: "The Pact"
2013	The Soul Man	Dr. Owens	Episode: "Get Thee Behind Me"
2014	Reckless	Vi Briggs	Main cast
2015	Hawaii Five-0	Diane	Episode: "Ike Hanau"
2016	Hit the Floor	Karen Halford	Episode: "Lockout"
2016	New Girl	Susan	2 episodes
2017	The Breaks	Ella Williams	Recurring cast
2018	Marlon	Miss Shabazz	Episode: "Divorce Counseling"
2020	Boomerang	Juanita	Episode: "End of the Road"
2021	A Black Lady Sketch Show	Aunt Bev	Episode: "Way to Ruin the Party, Soya!"
2021	Just Roll with It	—N/a	Director: 1 episode
2021	Bunk'd	—N/a	Director: 1 episode
2022	The Neighborhood	—N/a	Director: 2 episodes
2024–2025	Poppa's House	Caller #2	Voice, executive producer, director, writer

=== Web series ===
Year	Title	Role	Notes
2026	Still Got It with Izzi Fabulous	Izzi Fabulous	Creator, writer, producer

== Awards and nomiations ==
Award	Year	Category	Nominated work	Result	Ref.
BET Comedy Awards	2005	Outstanding Directing for a Comedy Series (Note: Shared with the directors.)	My Wife and Kids	Nominated	
BET Comedy Awards	2005	Outstanding Writing for a Comedy Series (Note: Shared with the writers.)	My Wife and Kids	Nominated	
Black Reel Awards	2012	Outstanding Supporting Actress	Pariah	Nominated	
Black Reel Awards	2012	Best Breakthrough Performance	Pariah	Nominated	
Chlotrudis Awards	2012	Best Supporting Actress	Pariah	Nominated	
NAACP Image Awards	2012	Outstanding Supporting Actress in a Motion Picture	Pariah	Nominated	
TV Land Awards	2012	Groundbreaking Show (Note: Shared with the cast.)	In Living Color	Won	
