= Shawn Wayans =

American actor and comedian (born 1971)

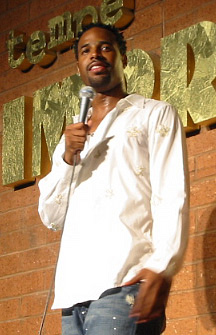
- Wayans in 2004
- Born: Shawn Mathis Wayans; January 19, 1971 (age 55); New York City, U.S.
- Occupations: Actor; comedian; writer; producer
- Years active: 1988–present
- Notable work: In Living Color, Scary Movie
- Children: 3
- Relatives: Dwayne Wayans (brother); Keenen Ivory Wayans (brother); Damon Wayans (brother); Kim Wayans (sister); Marlon Wayans (brother); Damon Wayans Jr. (nephew)
- Family: Wayans family

Shawn Mathis Wayans (/ˈweɪ.ənz/ WAY-ənz; born January 19, 1971) is an American actor, comedian, writer, and producer.

== Early life and education ==
Wayans, the ninth of ten siblings, was born in New York City, the son of Elvira Alethia (Green), a homemaker and social worker, and Howell Stouten Wayans, a supermarket manager. His family were once Jehovah's Witnesses. Wayans grew up in the Fulton Houses in the Manhattan neighborhood of Chelsea and is a 1989 graduate of the Bayard Rustin High School for the Humanities.

== Career ==
Wayans made his debut on the comedy television series In Living Color (1990–1993). He went on to work with his brother Marlon Wayans on The WB sitcom The Wayans Bros.(1995–1999) and the comedy films Don't Be a Menace to South Central While Drinking Your Juice in the Hood (1996), Scary Movie (2000), Scary Movie 2 (2001), White Chicks (2004), Little Man (2006), and Dance Flick (2009).

After an extended hiatus from acting, it was announced in February 2025 that Wayans would star in the sixth installment of the Scary Movie franchise, titled Scary Movie (2026), and would also star in the upcoming sequel film White Chicks 2 (TBA).

== Filmography ==
Key
†	Denotes productions that have not yet been released

=== Film ===
Year	Title	Role	Notes
1988	I'm Gonna Git You Sucka	Pedestrian	
1996	Don't Be a Menace to South Central While Drinking Your Juice in the Hood	Ashtray	Also co-writer
1999	New Blood	Valentine	
2000	Scary Movie	Ray Wilkins	Also co-writer
2001	Scary Movie 2	Ray Wilkins	Also co-writer
2004	White Chicks	Kevin Copeland	Also co-writer and co-producer
2006	Little Man	Darryl Edwards	Also co-writer and co-producer
2009	Dance Flick	Baby Daddy	Also co-writer and co-producer
2026	Scary Movie	Ray Wilkins	Also co-writer and co-producer

=== Television ===
Year	Title	Role	Notes
1990–1993	In Living Color	Himself	Main cast; 67 episodes (season 2–5)
1991	MacGyver	Robo	Episode: "The 'Hood"
1993	Hangin' with Mr. Cooper	Dominique	Episode: "PMS: Post Moving in Syndrome"
1995–1999	The Wayans Bros.	Shawn Williams	101 episodes; also co-creator
1996	The Parent 'Hood	Himself	Episode: "Ode to Billy Shankbreath"
1996–1997	Waynehead	Toof	Voice; 13 episodes
1999	Hollywood Squares	Himself	Recurring panelist
1999	Happily Ever After: Fairy Tales for Every Child	Bad Bobby	Voice; episode: "The Bremen Town Musicians"
2000	Comedy Central Canned Ham	Himself	Episode: "Scary Movie"
2000	2000 MTV Video Music Awards	Himself	Main host
2001	Mad TV	Himself	Episode: "Episode #6.25"
2006	The Boo Crew	Slim	Voice; television special
2016	Animals	Tommy	Voice; episode: "Squirrels Part I"

=== Documentary ===
Year	Title	Notes
1991	The Best of Robert Townsend & His Partners in Crime	
2001	Open Mic	
2009	Why We Laugh: Black Comedians on Black Comedy	
