= Warrior Girls =

NBA Cheerleading Group

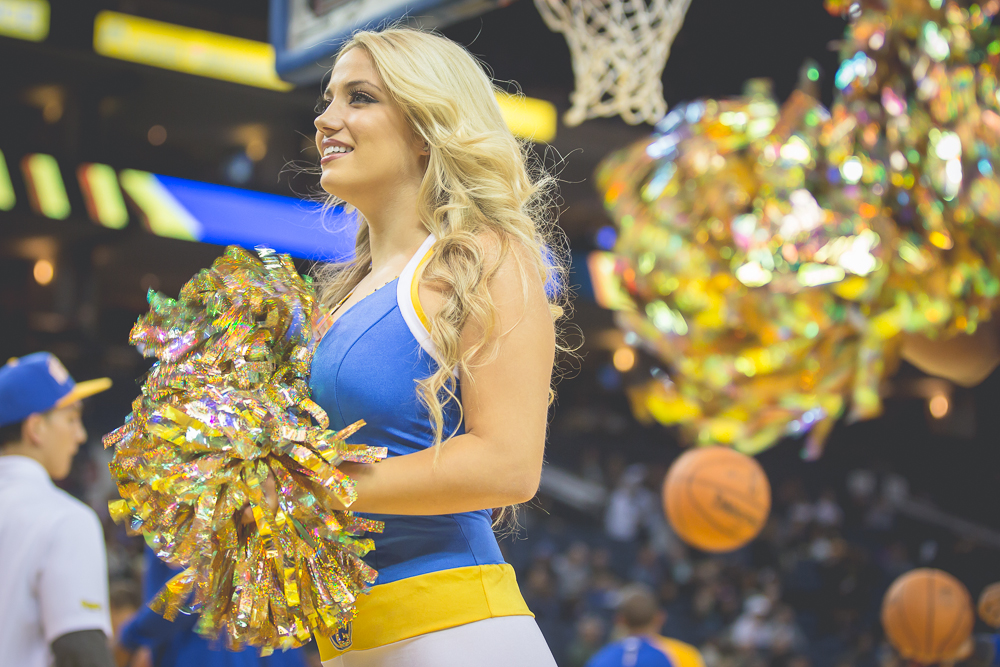
A Warriors dancer

The Golden State Warrior Girls are an all-female National Basketball Association Cheerleading dance squad that performs in support of the Golden State Warriors during home games at Chase Center in San Francisco, California. The dance team consists of 18 women who also serve as ambassadors of the Warriors organization. The squad's dance style is primarily hip-hop and jazz although other styles are often incorporated into their dance routines. The dancers typically perform during two of the four regulation quarters. The squad also regularly performs during the opening and half-time ceremonies, as well as team time-outs. Typical dance routines last around 60 to 90 seconds. Over the course of the season the dance squad will perform at 43 home games including two preseason games. The squad also performs at playoff games when their team qualifies. In addition to their performances, the Warrior Girls are regular attendees of season ticket holder events which take place throughout the season. At these events, they interact with fans, assist with raffles, and sign autographs on behalf of the Warriors franchise.

Besides basketball games, the dancers regularly perform at national and international dance clinics and competitions and regularly participate in community outreach programs throughout the Bay Area.

== Community outreach ==
In addition to providing entertainment at Warrior's home games, the dancers are also active in the community and serve as good-will ambassadors for the Warriors Organization.
The Warrior Girls organize and participate in many philanthropic events including the NBA's Read to Achieve Program. Throughout the season the Warrior Girls host multiple 'Reading Time Outs' in which they read books to Bay Area school children.

== Swimsuit calendar ==
The Warrior Girls are well known for their annual swimsuit calendar. Only a handful of NBA dance teams release swimsuit calendars. The first swimsuit calendar was released in 2007 under the coordination of their then first year coach, Susan Hovey. After the success of the 2007 Calendar, the release of the Warrior Girls calendar has become an annual event and continues to draw large crowds to Golden State Warrior events and games. The Warrior Girls 2009-2010 Swimsuit Calendar was released on December 5, 2009, and debuted prior to tip-off of the Warriors-Orlando Magic game. The calendar debut has become somewhat of a tradition for Warrior fans who line up each year to have their copy of the calendar signed by the dancers.

== Notable former members ==
- Lisa Joann Thompson, dancer, actress, choreographer, starred in In Living Color and Fame L.A., and Motown Live.
- Bonnie-Jill Laflin, model, actress, and television personality.

== Gallery ==
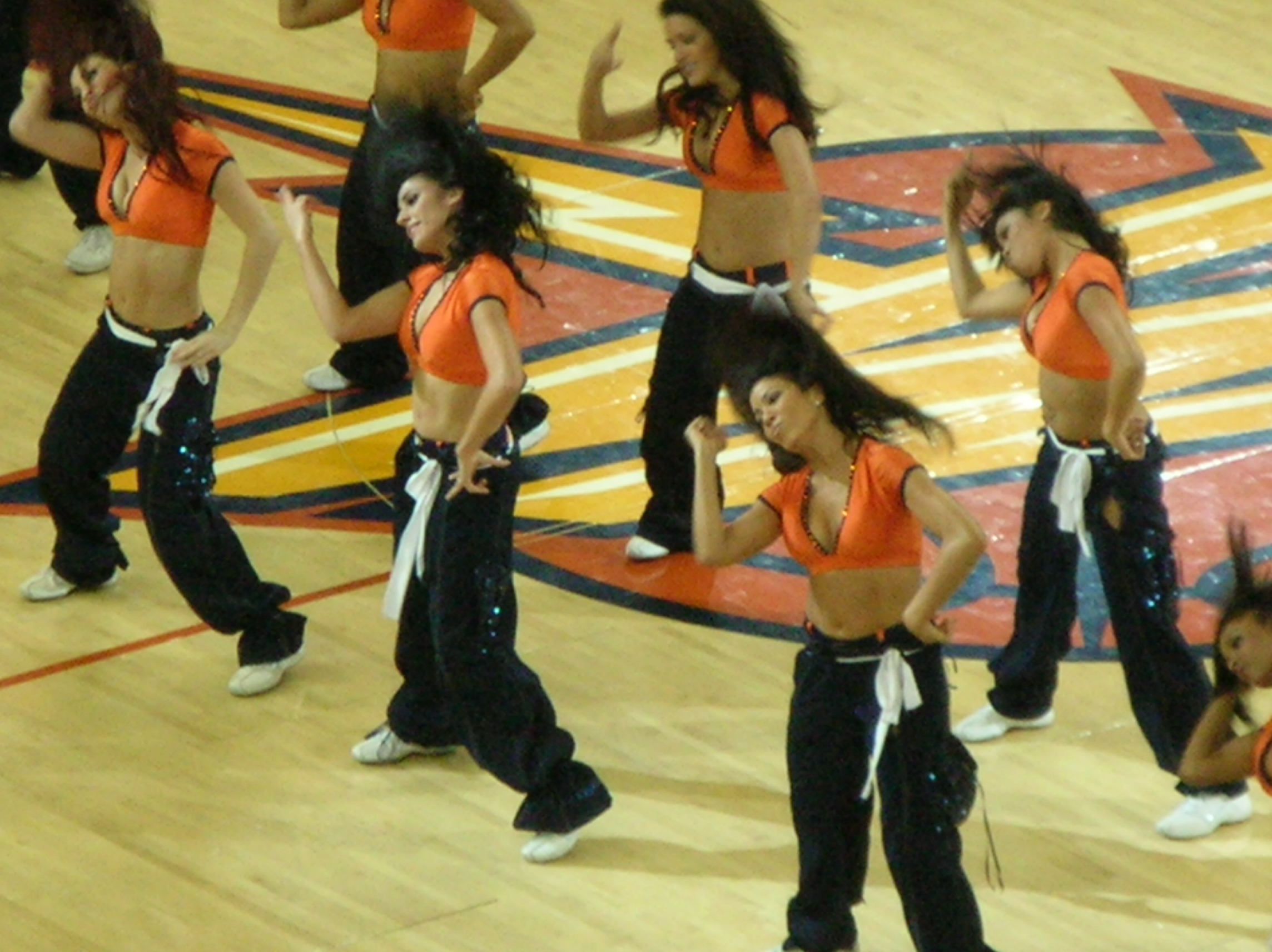

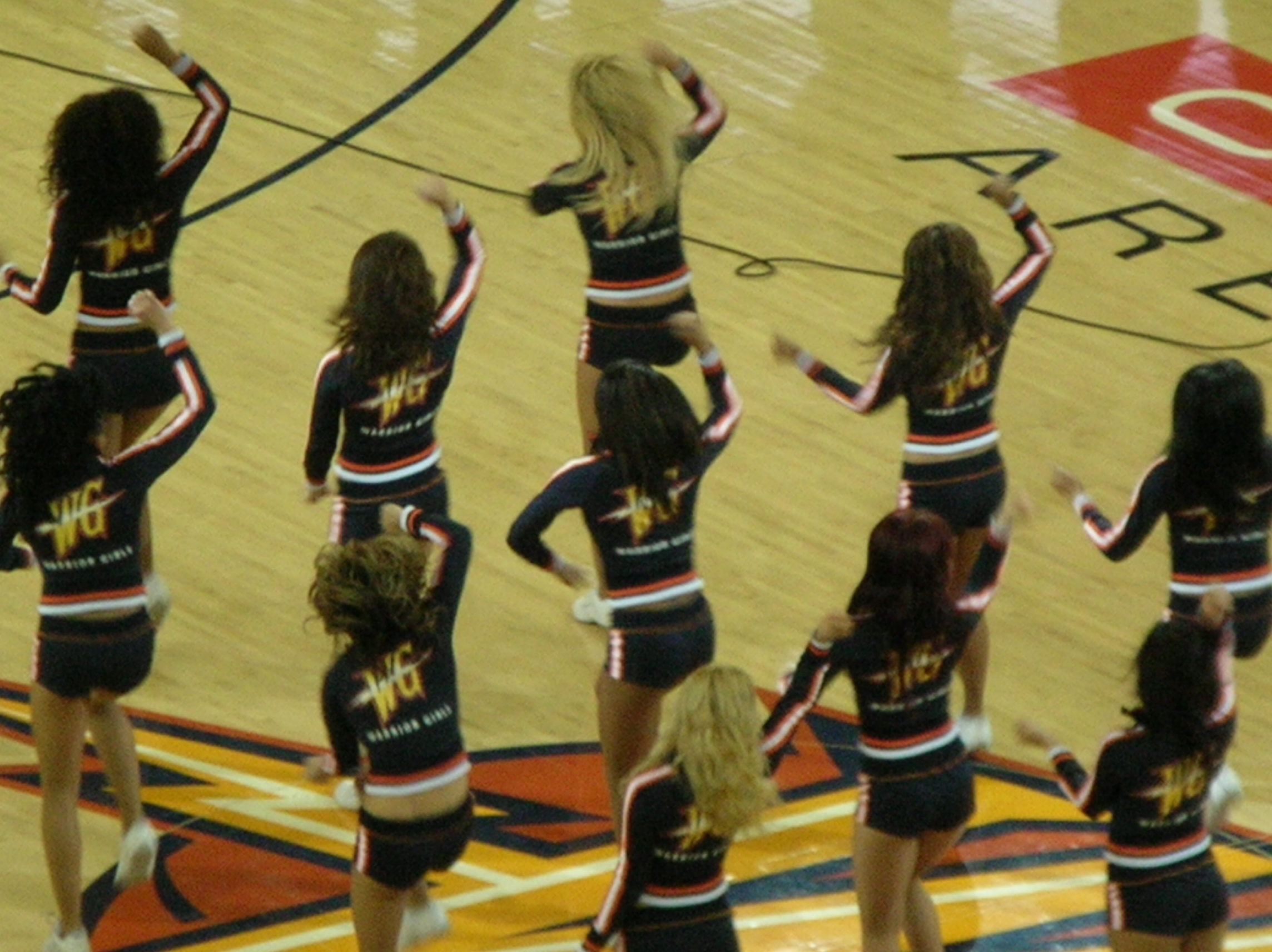

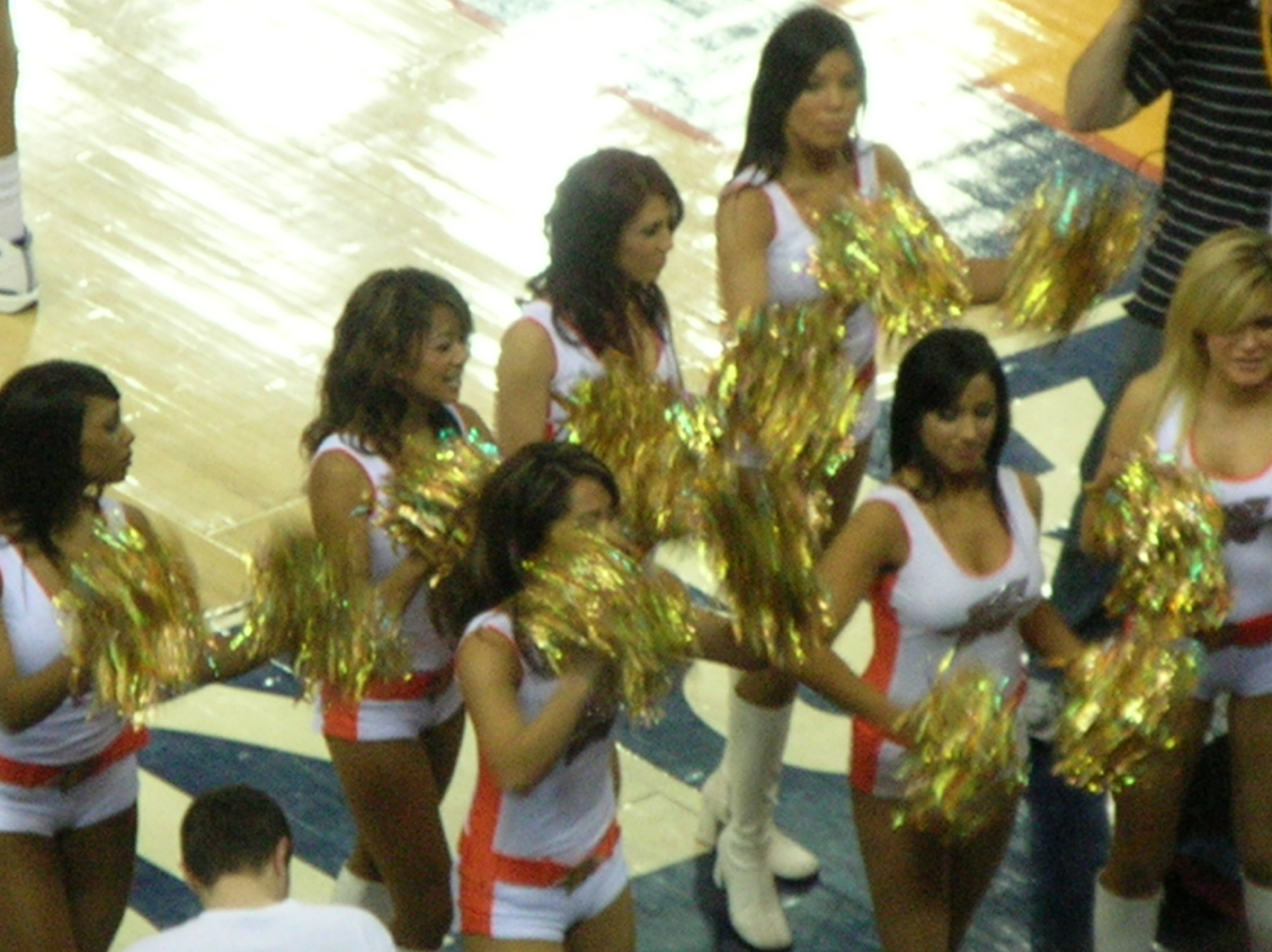

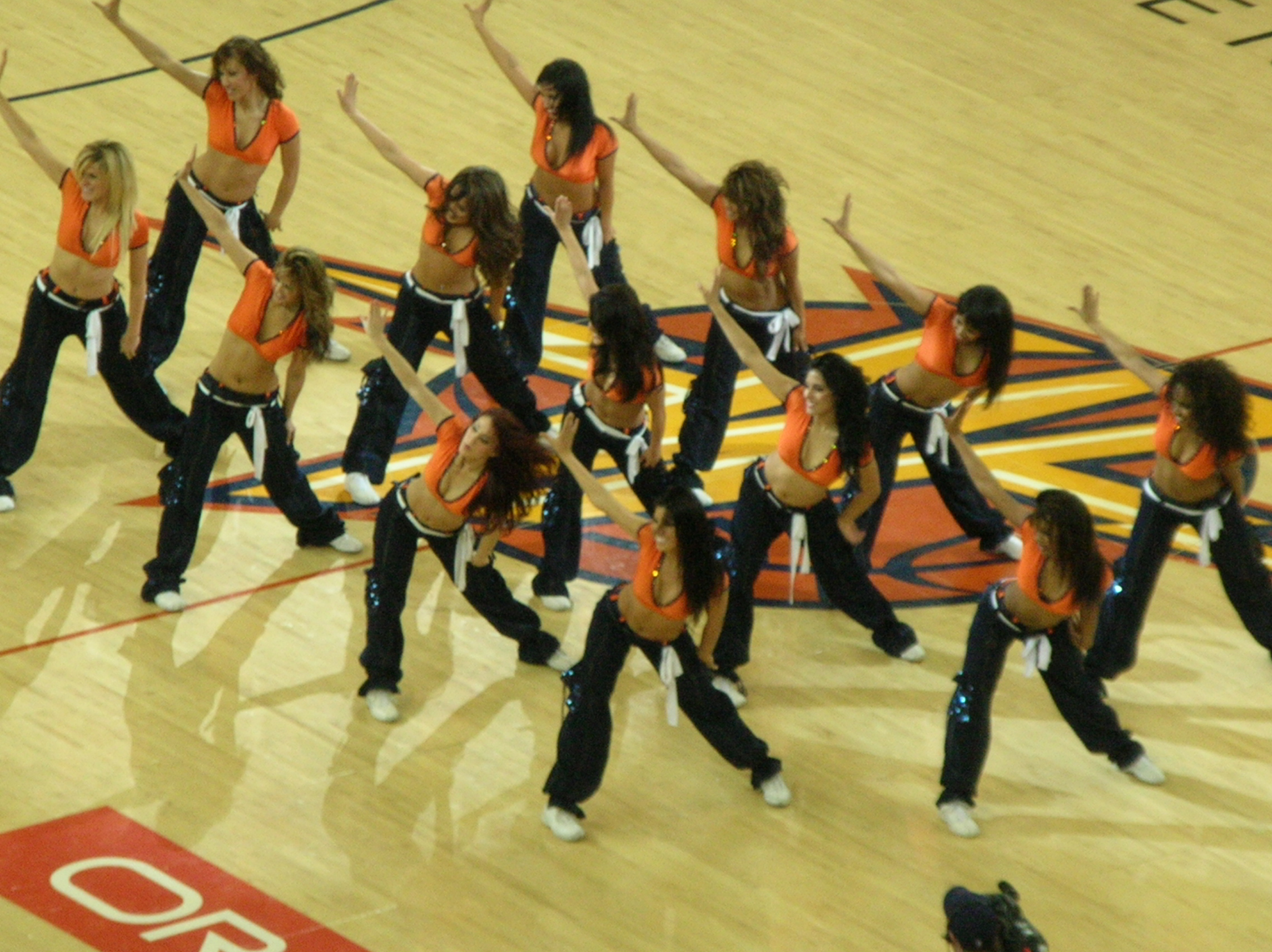

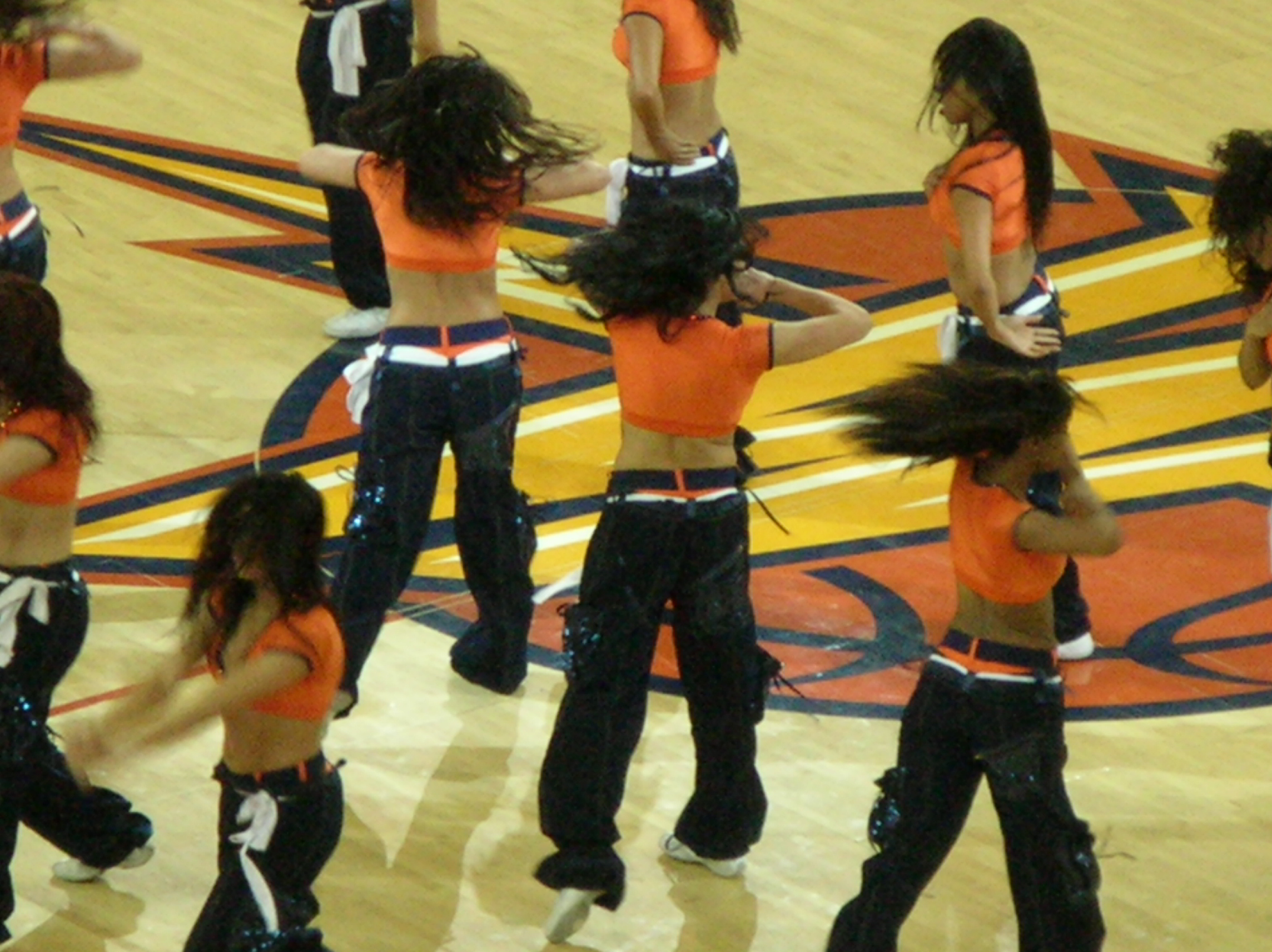

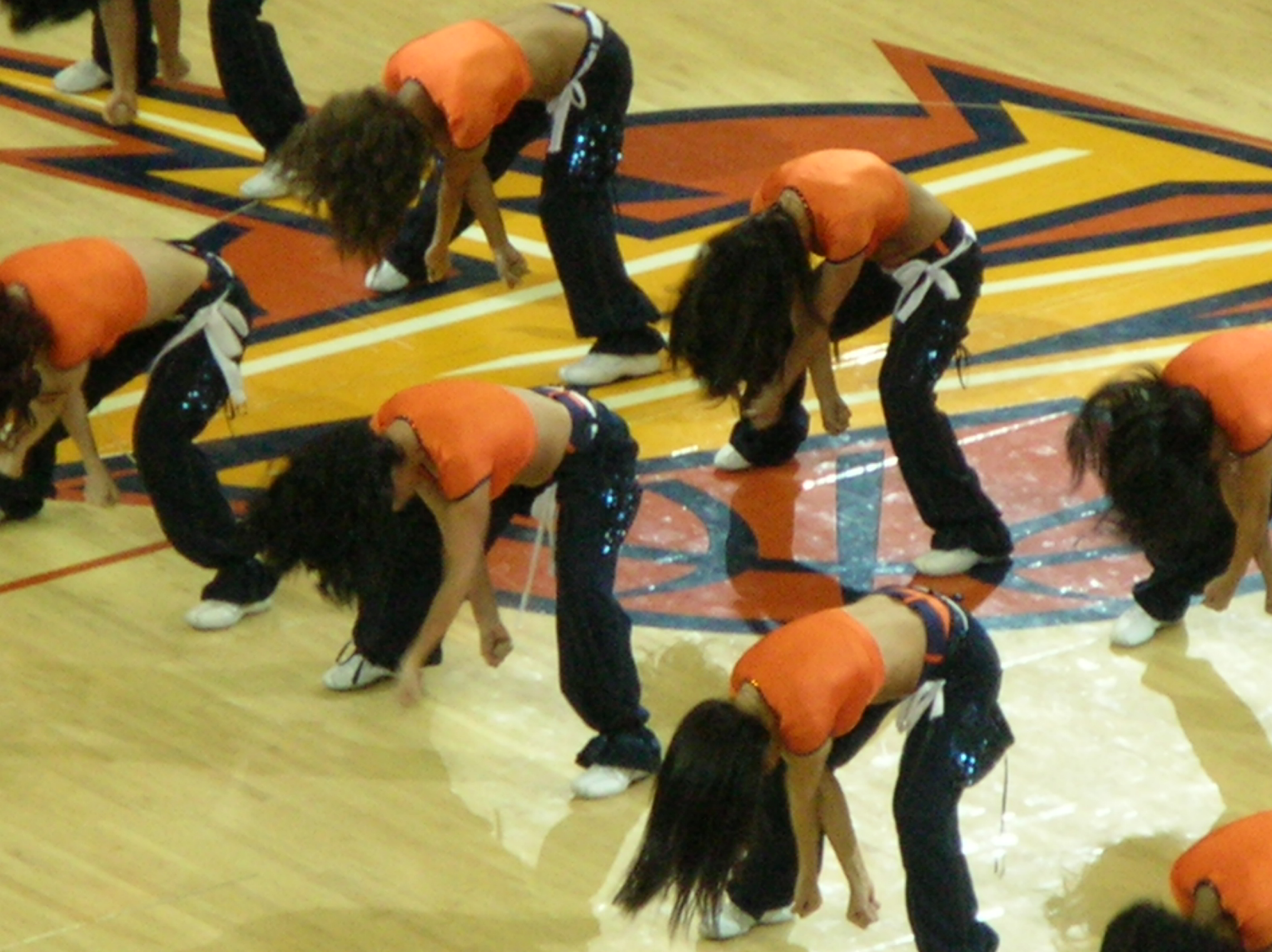

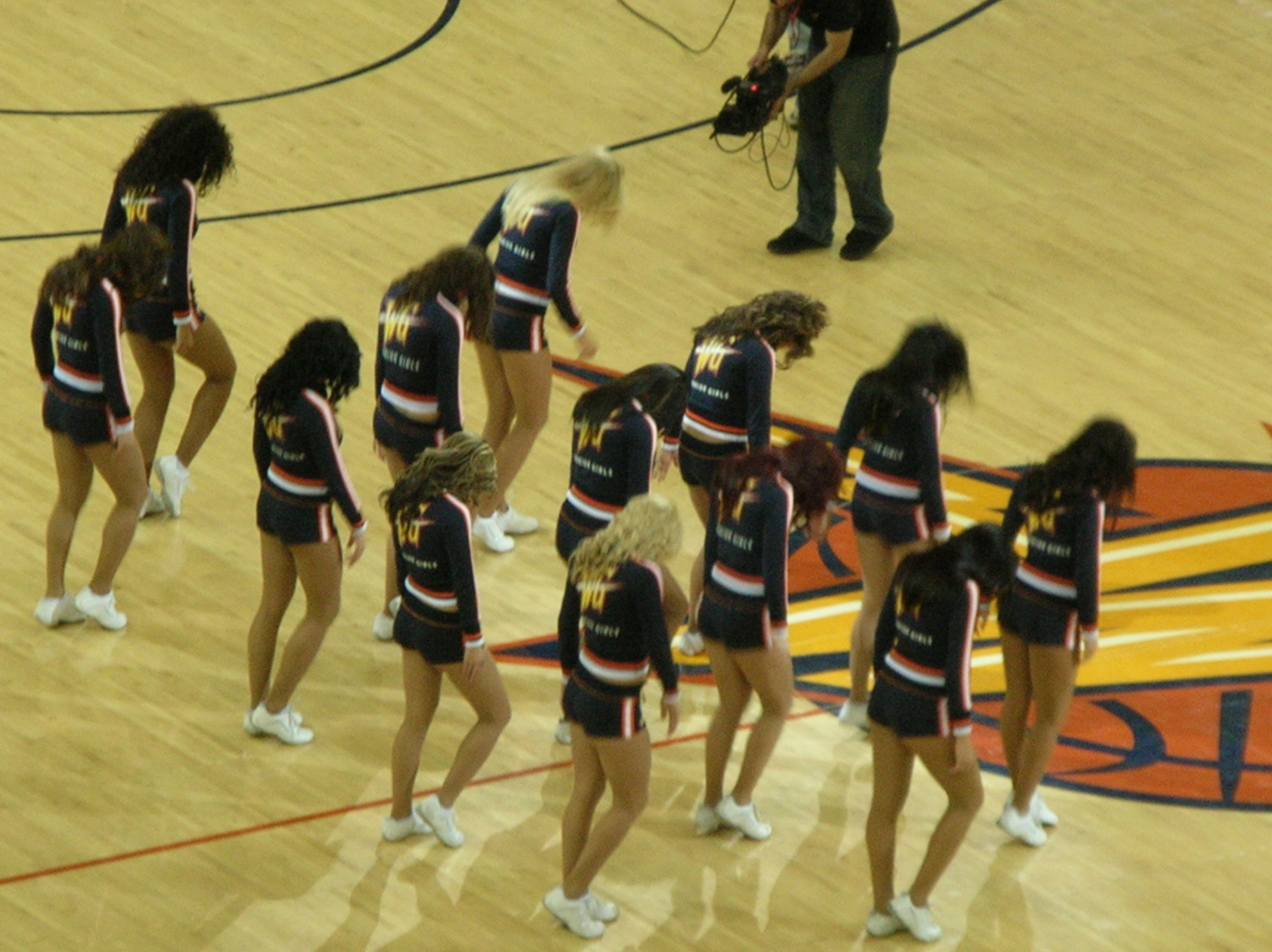

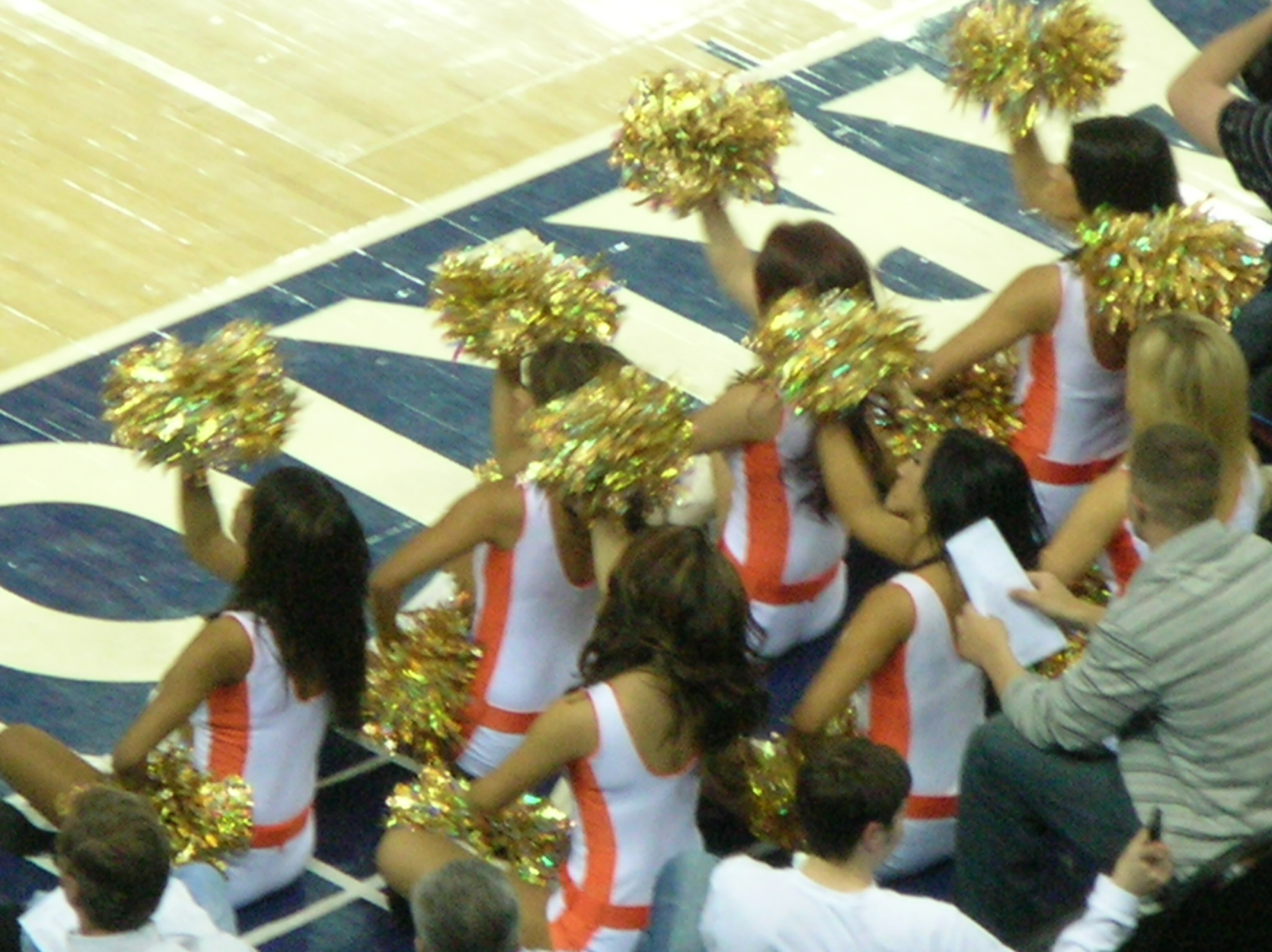
