= List of In Living Color episodes =

This article lists the episodes of the television show In Living Color during its five-season run.

== Series overview ==
Season	Episodes	Originally released	
Season	Episodes	First released	Last released
1	13	April 15, 1990	September 9, 1990
2	26	September 23, 1990	September 1, 1991
3	30	September 22, 1991	May 17, 1992
4	32	September 27, 1992	May 23, 1993
5	26	September 16, 1993	May 19, 1994

== Episodes ==
This list is considered far from complete. Some sketches may have been omitted due to lack of evidence. Sources of the sketch titles shown below come from the DVD collection and the televised version shown on Fox, FX, FXX, BET, Centric, Aspire, and Fusion TV.

=== Season 1 (1990) ===
No. overall	No. in season	Title	Sketches	Original release date	Viewers (millions)
1	1	"Pilot"	"Love Connection: Jewish Woman Dates a Black Man"; "Great Moments in Black History: First Black Man on the Moon"; "Homeboy Shopping Network"; "Redd Foxx for Hire"; "Equity Express"; "Men on Film"	April 15, 1990	22.7
Notes: Jim Carrey, Kelly Coffield, Kim Coles, Tommy Davidson, David Alan Grier, T'Keyah Crystal Keymáh, Damon Wayans, Keenen Ivory Wayans, and Kim Wayans' first episode as cast members.; Cari French, Carrie Ann Inaba, Deidre Lang, Lisa Marie Todd, and Michelle Whitney-Morrison's first episode as Fly Girls.; Shawn Wayans' first episode as DJ SW-1.
2	2	"The Wrath of Farrakhan"	"Do-It-Yourself Milli Vanilli Kit"; "Arsenio and Marion Barry"; "Rap Choir"; "Sugar Ray Leonard Transition"; "Star Trek: The Wrath of Farrakhan"; "Ridin' Miss Daisy"	April 21, 1990	9.7
3	3	"Lean On Me Beautiful"	Shawn is asked to take off Keenen's shoes and Damon's shirt in the show opener; "Lean on Me, Beautiful"; "Mitzvah Train"; "Go On Girl"; "Oswald Bates for The United Negro Scholarship Fund"; "Too-Too Ethnic"; "Lassie '90"; "Richard Pryor: Scared for No Reason"; "Vortex, the Super Absorbent Tampons"	April 28, 1990	10.3
Note: This episode did not air in syndication.
4	4	"Transitions"	Shawn tries to replace Keenen and take over in the show opener; "Oprah"; "Bolt 45 (malt liquor) (original FOX broadcast only); "The Exxxon Family" (replaces the above sketch on DVD and in syndication); "Great Moments in Black History: The First Self-Service Gas Station"; "Jim Carrey's Celebrity Impressions Transition"; "Rhythmless Nation"; "Anton"; "Men on Art"	May 5, 1990	12.7
5	5	"A Date With Grace Jones"	Shawn lets someone else take over as DJ in return for Los Angeles Lakers tickets in the show opener; "Three Champs and a Baby"; "New Ambassador"; "A Date with Grace"; "Hefty World Condominium Estates"; "Homeboy Shopping Network: Used Car Sale"; "Black World"	May 12, 1990	11.7
6	6	"Jheri's Kids"	"Bad Karate Class"; "Greshan Formula"; "Jheri's Kids"; "Tracy Chapman's Creative Process"; "Oppression for Black Men"; "Snackin' Shack"	May 19, 1990	10.0
7	7	"Don King: The Early Years"	"Don King: The Early Years"; "Cookin' with Salt-n-Pepa"; "Hey Mon"; "Ted Turner's Very Colorized Classics—Casablanca"; "Rallo"; "Men on Books"	May 27, 1990	18.1
8	8	"Endangered Species"	Rallo appears in the show opener; "President Jackson's Farewell Address"; "K-Tel Presents Cephus & Reesie Mayweather"; "Endangered Species"; "Casa de Hair"; "This Ol' Box" with Anton Jackson	June 3, 1990	21.8
9	9	"Introducing... Homey D. Clown"	"Mo' Money with Whiz and Ice"; "America's Funniest Security Camera Videos"; "Andrea Dice Clay"; "Hey Mon/Hedly Airlines"; "Homey D. Clown"	June 17, 1990	19.3
10	10	"Vera De Milo"	"Michael Jackson Mr. Potato Head"; "Disc Jokey, Death Jockey Trailer"; "School for the Self-Taught"; "Lil' Miss Trouble"; "Uncle Joe's Fairy Tales"; "Old Train"; "Vera De Milo, Bodybuilder"	June 24, 1990	19.8
Note: This episode did not air in syndication.
11	11	"Anton In The People's Court"	Keenen comes out as Marsha Warfield in the show opener; "The Brothers Brothers"; "MC Hammer Video"; "Cine-Globe"; "Calhoun Tubbs"; "Ted Turner's Very Colorized Classics— Redd Foxx's The Kid"; "Anton on Po' People's Court"; Close featuring guest dancers Soul Brothers	July 15, 1990	18.1
12	12	"Conspiracy"	"Vortex of Fear"; "Ray Charles in Charge"; "Little Richard's Playhouse"; "Della Reese's Pieces"; "Secret Council"; "I Love Laquita"	September 2, 1990	12.5
13	13	"Homey D Clown Returns"	"Homey D. Clown's One Stop Carnival"; "David Alan Grier Transition" (does not air on Aspire); "Benita Butrell"; "Michael Winslow—A One-Man Show"; "Samantha Kinison"; "The Buttmans"	September 9, 1990	16.2
Note: Kim Coles' last episode as a cast member.

=== Season 2 (1990–91) ===
No. overall	No. in season	Title	Sketches	Original release date	Viewers (millions)
14	1	"Big Brother"	The Wayans family parody their newfound success in the show opener, strongly suggesting a spoof of the Jackson 5ive.; "Hey Mon/Hedley Hospital"; "Sidekick"; "Bigger Brothers"; "Mudhead's Funeral"; "Men on Films II"; Close featuring Flavor Flav, followed by Queen Latifah performing "Mama Gave Birth to the Soul Children"	September 23, 1990	17.7
Note: This episode does not air in syndication.
15	2	"Anton at the Recruiter"	A young fan confuses Keenen with his other family members in the show opener; "Anton: Army Recruitment Office"; "The Man Trainer"; "Roseanne Sings America" (does not air on Aspire); "Banned in the U.S.A" (Luther Campbell struggles with himself not to use profanity).; "Homey D. Clown: When Homey Met Sally"	September 30, 1990	20.0
16	3	"Spike's Joint"	"Untouchables" baseball bat dinner intro; "Flatuscents"; "Good Morning/Good Night"; "Cephus & Reesie's Broadway Tour" (featuring Sandra Crouch and the Andraé Crouch Singers as backup singers); "The Buttmans: Guess Who's Coming to Dinner?"; "Spike's Joint" (featuring cameo from Rosie Perez reprising her character from Do the Right Thing)	October 7, 1990	18.4
17	4	"Hour of Power"	"Fly Girl Heart Surgeons"; "Tag Team Evangelists"; "Benita Butrell: Uninvited Guest"; "1-900-YT-GUILT"; "Al MacAfee: Hall Monitor"; Close featuring Monie Love performing "Monie in the Middle"	October 14, 1990	17.8
Note: This episode does not air in syndication.
18	5	"Miss Black Person USA"	The B.S. Brothers make their debut in the show opener; "Black Like You"; "Go On Girl: Sensitive Men"; "I Won't Drift Away"; "Miss Black Person U.S.A."	October 21, 1990	20.0
19	6	"The Black Man's Guide to Understanding the Black Woman"	Show opener featuring Heavy D & the Boyz performing the show's theme song; "Hey Mon/Hedley Court"; "Shahrazad Ali's Video"; "Snackin' Shack"; "Frenchie"	October 28, 1990	18.2
20	7	"Funky Finger Productions"	"Shawn Wayans, Rap Star"; "B.S. Brothers: Penitentiary IV"; "Iraqi Fashion Show"; "Lil' Miss Trouble: The School Play"; "Vera de Milo: Buffed, Beautiful and Bitchin'"; "Homeboy Shopping Network: Hollywood Homeboys"	November 4, 1990	19.7
21	8	"Laquita Meets Billy Dee"	"Magenta Thompson's Acting School"; "Foundation for Golf Heritage"; "Evelyn Smith"; "Laquita Sings the Blues" (with guest star Billy Dee Williams as himself); Close featuring Billy Dee Williams	November 11, 1990	17.1
22	9	"Men on Vacation"	Carl Jamal Taylor guest stars as the first "Fly Guy" in the show opener; "Lassie '90"; "Amazing Grace—Rocky VI"; "Dinner with Millie" (cut from DVD); "PMS Defense System"; "Men on Vacation"; Close featuring 3rd Bass performing "Product of the Environment (Remix)"	November 18, 1990	19.6
23	10	"Anton's Thanksgiving"	"The Brothers Brothers: Two Sistas for Two Brothers"; "Barbara Bush Visits the Illiterates"; "Dickie Peterson: Cherub of Justice"; "Anton's Thanksgiving"; Close featuring D-Nice performing a medley of "Scott Made Me Funky" and "Call Me D-Nice"	November 25, 1990	21.6
Note: This episode does not air in syndication.
24	11	"Justice Legions of America"	"Three Champs and a Little Lady"; "The Newlywed Game"; "The Good Behavior Variety Hour"; "Handi Man: The Justice Legion of America"; Close featuring Nikki D performing "Lettin' Off Steam"	December 16, 1990	17.5
25	12	"Veracosa"	"Afro-phone" (does not air on Aspire); "Vera De Milo: Veracosa, Mistress of Destruction"; "Cephus & Reesie: The Christmas Album"; "Lil' Miss Trouble at the Museum"; "Homey D. Clown: Homey Claus"; Close featuring the infamous 25th episode cake incident, where David Alan Grier runs his finger through the cake and is subsequently caught and dumped, fanny-first, on top of it	December 23, 1990	17.9
26	13	"Johnny Abdul"	"The Brothers Brothers: Tom and Tom for the Arizona Tourism Commission"; "Johnny Abdul—Saudi-Rock Star"; "The Last Orphan"; "Velma Mullholland"; "B.S. Brothers: Funky Finger Productions"; "The Head Detective" (the Aspire version cuts off the sketch after the end of the opening hospital scene); Close featuring Rich Nice performing "Outstanding"	January 13, 1991	18.9
27	14	"Introducing... Fire Marshal Bill"	Keenen introduces new Fly Girl Carla Garrido in the show opener; "Mr. Squeegee"; "B.S. Brothers: Big Break"; "Fashion Tampons"; "Fire Marshall Bill: Home Safety"; "Homey D. Clown: Home E. Cheese"	February 3, 1991	16.6
Notes: Carla Garrido's first episode as a Fly Girl.; This episode does not air in syndication.
28	15	"My Dark Conscience"	Keenen's grandmother operates the boom mic in the show opener; "Benita Butrell: Block Captain"; "Vanilla Ice - White White Baby" (featuring 2 Four 2 as backup dancers; cut from DVD); "Al Macafee, Prom Chaperone"; "Oswald Meets the Parole Board" (featuring Wonderful Smith as a parole board member); "My Dark Conscience"; "Fruit of the Loom Boxers"	February 10, 1991	18.7
29	16	"Anton in the Burbs"	"Ejector Bed"; "Frenchie at a Bachelor Party"; "Lonny Parker, Attorney at Law"; "Les and Wes: Twin Stars" (with guest stars John Tesh and Leeza Gibbons as themselves); "Anton in the Burbs"; Close featuring Leaders of the New School performing "Case of the P.T.A."	February 17, 1991	19.7
30	17	"PCN's Win, Lose or Draw"	"Prison Cable Network's Win, Lose, or Draw"; "Milk Commercial with Marsha Warfield"; "Pentagon Briefing"; "Calhoun Tubbs on the Campaign Trail"; "The Great Sperm Bank Robbery"; "Andrea Dice Clay on Love Connection"	February 24, 1991	20.8
31	18	"Lil Magic's School Play"	"The Brothers Brothers: Tom and Tom at the Country Club"; "Oprah PSA" (does not air on Aspire); "End Zone Choreographer"; "Lil' Magic: The Government Cheese"; "Fire Marshall Bill: Classroom Safety"; Close featuring Another Bad Creation performing "Iesha"	March 3, 1991	19.2
32	19	"Hour of Power: Tag Team Evangalists"	"David Alan Grier's Tribute to Broadway"; "Velma II"; "Cephus & Reesie: Last Request"; "`'Do You Feel Lucky?`' Promo"; "The 595 Club"; "Vera DeMilo: Pretty Buffed Woman"; Close featuring KRS-One performing "The Bridge Is Over"	March 17, 1991	15.9
33	20	"Super Fly"	Tommy Davidson and David Alan Grier perform a musical history of Keenen and the show in the show opener; "B.S. Brothers & Sistas"; "Summer's Dawn"; "Lil' Miss Trouble Runs Away"; "The Superfly"; "Snackin' Shack: The New Waitress"; Close featuring guest dancers 2 Four 2	March 31, 1991	14.6
34	21	"Anton at the Recruiter"	"Anton Volunteers" (repeat from Season 2, Episode 2); "Fashion Tampons" (repeat from Season 2, Episode 14); "Spike's Joint" (repeat from Season 2, Episode 3); "I Won't Drift Away" (repeat from Season 2, Episode 5); "Ejector Bed" (repeat from Season 2, Episode 16); "Head Detective" (repeat from Season 2, Episode 13); "Men on Film" (repeat from Season 2, Episode 1)	April 14, 1991	15.6
Notes: Best-of episode; This episode is not included on all releases of the DVD.
35	22	"Arsenio Hall of Justice"	Keenen demonstrates the comedy wheel of race in the show opener; "Detective Head Goes Bowling"; "Handi Man's Evil Twin"; "The Arsenio Hall of Justice" (featuring Ellen Cleghorne as a courtroom observer); Close featuring Ice Cube introducing Public Enemy, who performed a medley of "Security of the First World", "Black Steel in the Hour of Chaos", "Buck Whylin'", "Fight the Power", and "911 Is a Joke"	April 28, 1991	15.0
36	23	"Compilations"	"Three Champs and a Little Lady" (repeat from Season 2, Episode 11); "Black Like You" (repeat from Season 2, Episode 5); "New Ambassador" (repeat from Season 1, Episode 5); "Tracy Chapman's Creative Process" (repeat from Season 1, Episode 6; cut from DVD); "Mo' Money with Whiz and Ice" (repeat from Season 1, Episode 9); "Vanilla Ice - White White Baby" (repeat from Season 2, Episode 15; cut from DVD); Close featuring The Afros performing "This Jam's for You"	May 5, 1991	15.3
Note: Best-of episode
37	24	"Homey the Sellout: Part 1"	Kelly Coffield, T'Keyah Crystal Keymáh, and Kim Wayans replace the Fly Girls in the show opener; "Lil' Magic: The Audition"; "Oprah's Restaurant" (featuring Ellen Cleghorne as a restaurant customer); "Homey D. Clown: Homey Sells Out"; "Men on Television: Blaine Becomes Hetero"	May 12, 1991	15.1
Notes: Close featuring Dwayne Wayans; Season finale
38	25	"Dickie Peterson: Cherub of Justice"	"Dickie Peterson: Secret Service"; "A New 911 Message Service"; "Frenchie at the Opera"; "Clear Conscience Fur Farm and Outlet Store"; "Velma Mulholland Sings"; "Visiting Day for Oswald"	August 11, 1991	10.7
39	26	"Men on Vacation"	"Amazing Grace—Rocky VI" (repeat from Season 2, Episode 9); "Vera DeMilo: Veracosa, Mistress of Destruction" (repeat from Season 2, Episode 12); "Mudhead's Funeral" (repeat from Season 2, Episode 1); "Men on Vacation" (repeat from Season 2, Episode 9); "Homey D. Clown: When Homey Met Sally" (repeat from Season 2, Episode 2)	September 1, 1991	12.2
Notes: Carla Garrido and Michelle Whitney-Morrison's last episode as Fly Girls.; Shawn Wayans' last episode as DJ.; Best-of episode

=== Season 3 (1991–92) ===
No. overall	No. in season	Title	Sketches	Original release date	Viewers (millions)
40	1	"Homey the Sellout: Part 2"	"Sleazo's Pee Wee Herman Mugshot Doll and Pornhouse Playset"; Keenen introduces the new cast members, as well as new Fly Girl Jennifer Lopez and DJ Twist, in the show opener; "Crown Heights Story" (cut from DVD); "Misery II: with Rick James"; "Homey D. Clown: Homey Meets the Man" (conclusion to last season's "Homey Sells Out" sketch); "The Head Detective Goes Undergarment"	September 22, 1991	22.5
Notes: Jamie Foxx, Steve Park, and Shawn Wayans' first episode as cast members.; Jennifer Lopez's first episode as a Fly Girl.; Leroy "Twist" Casey replaces Shawn Wayans as the show's DJ.
41	2	"Men on Television Part 2: What Happened to Blaine?"	"Kung Fu Master '91"; "The Al Sharpton and Louis Farrakhan Comedy Hour: Jews on First"; "Velma Mulholland: The Burglar"; "Oswald Bates: The Silence of The Lambs II"; "Men on Film: Straight Man Out" (conclusion to previous season's cliffhanger "Blaine Becomes Hetero")	September 29, 1991	22.2
42	3	"Clarence Thomas's First Day"	"Clarence Thomas: Sweet Clarence's Badass Song"; "El Grande Y Spectacular Muchacho Rockeeter" (a.k.a. "The Mexican Rocketeer"); "Al MacAfee: Sex Ed Hall Monitor"; "Butt-Out Jeans by Prince"; "Benita Butrell: Carnival Booth"; "Anton: Shakespeare in the Park"	October 6, 1991	19.3
43	4	"Green Eggs and the Guvment Cheese"	"Jesse Jackson's Children Books" (a.k.a. "Green Eggs and Ham"); "LL Cool JJ -- Mama's Gonna Kick Me Out" (cut from DVD); "Hey Mon: The Hedleys vs. The Wans"; "Funky Finger Productions"; "Fire Marshal Bill: Cruise Vacation"; Close featuring Leaders of the New School performing "Teachers, Don't Teach Us Nonsense!!"	October 13, 1991	18.1
44	5	"The Adventures of Handi-Boy"	"Clarence Thomas: I'm Going to Girlie World"; "Closeted Gay Construction Guys"; "Snackin' Shack: Pirate-Themed"; "Prison Cable Network Fall Promos" (cut from DVD); "Dinner at Lizzy's"; "Cephus and Reesie: Bar Mitzvah"; "Handi-Man: The Adventures of Handi Boy"	October 20, 1991	20.3
45	6	"Home Alone Again"	"Sally Struthers: Adopt a Child Star"; "Muttco's Coyote Ugly One-Night Stand Escape Kit"; "The Brothers Brothers: Black Like You"; "Minute Maiden and Minute Man Sex Partner Replacement Juice"; "Ninja Home Security System"; "Milk Commercial with Vera DeMilo"; "Home Alone Again with Michael Jackson" (featuring Jonathan Taylor Thomas as Macaulay Culkin); Close featuring Nice & Smooth performing a medley of "Hip Hop Junkies" and "How to Flow"	October 27, 1991	20.2
46	7	"The Jackson Bunch"	"The Jackson Bunch" (parody of The Brady Bunch; cut from DVD); "Act Up! Guy in the Park"; "Arsenio Hall: Dare To Say 'Hmmmm" (featuring Danielle Harris as a teen drug abuser); "Ice Poe: Street Poet"; "Samantha Kinison: The Kinisons at Home" (with guest star Sam Kinison as himself); Close featuring Sam Kinison	November 3, 1991	19.9
47	8	"Late Night With Mike Tyson"	"Paula Abdul - Promise of a Thin Me" (cut from DVD); "Sheila Peace"; "Les and Wes On The Run"; "Timbuk: The Last Runaway Slave"; "Late Night with Mike Tyson"; Close featuring Big Daddy Kane performing "Ooh, Aah, Nah-Nah-Nah"	November 10, 1991	19.4
48	9	"Krishna Cop"	"The David Duke Show" (cut from DVD); "Oswald: 48 Hours Again"; "Krishna Cop"; "My Songs are Mindless" (cut from DVD); "Family Few"; "Detective Head Meets Mrs. Potato Head"; Close featuring Queen Latifah performing "Latifah's Had It Up 2 Here"	November 17, 1991	17.8
49	10	"My Left Foot of Fury"	"The Wilt Chamberlain Memorial"; "My Left Foot of Fury"; "The Groom Room"; "Frenchie Goes to Alcoholics Anonymous"; "Skully Conditioner"; "Men on Film Festival"	November 24, 1991	21.5
50	11	"Anton and the Reporter"	"Jimmy Swaggart: Heaven or Hell?"; "Benita Butrell: Witness for the Prosecution"; "Calhoun Tubbs Mentors A British Rock Star"; "Anton and The Undercover Journalist"	December 8, 1991	19.8
51	12	"Sidekick in Nam"	"Bill Cosby for The Cosby Condom"; "HBO's Tired Comedy Night"; "Lil' Magic: Helen Keller"; "Tes-T-Shields Masculine Hygiene Pads"; "Sidekick in Nam!"; "The Ugly Woman's Blind Date"	December 15, 1991	17.7
52	13	"Santa Fire Marshal Bill"	"Equity Express Blue Dot/Kennedy Carte Blanche"; "Tommy Wu Seminar"; "Homey the Clown: Homey at the Circus"; "Great Moments in Black History: The Jheri Curl"; "Kid Spike Lee"; "Fire Marshal Bill: Fire Marshall Santa"	December 22, 1991	17.5
53	14	"Michael Jackson: Little Timmy's Not My Lover"	Michael Jackson: Am I Black or White (cut from DVD); "B.S. Brothers at the Funeral" (featuring Wonderful Smith as the reverend); Darnel Bond: Agent 006 (cut from DVD); "Handi-Man and the Tiny Avenger" (featuring Debbie Lee Carrington as the Tiny Avenger); Close featuring A Tribe Called Quest performing "Check the Rhime"	January 12, 1992	22.5
54	15	"Grim Reaper"	"Me Want Maury" (cut from DVD); "Frenchie at Lamaze Class"; "The Big Apple Airlines"; "Death Takes a Holiday (a.k.a. The Grim Reaper's Vacation)"; "Star Trek: The Really Last Voyage"	January 19, 1992	19.8
55	16	"Homeboy Shopping Network"	"Homeboyz Shopping Network"; "Fire Marshall Bill at the Sports Bar"; "Sugar Ray's Celebrity Interviews" (with guest stars Phil Buckman, Blair Underwood, Pauly Shore, and Corin Nemec); "Men on Football" (all versions - including DVD and syndication - edit out ad-libbed lines implying that Richard Gere and Carl Lewis are homosexuals); "Background Guy: Super Bowl Interview"; Close featuring Sam Kinison, followed by Color Me Badd performing "I Wanna Sex You Up"	January 26, 1992	28.9
Note: Live Super Bowl halftime show
56	17	"George Bush Meet Tommy Wu"	"George H. W. Bush Acts Like Tommy Wu"; "The Detective Head Gets Framed" (featuring Steven Williams as the police chief); "Don Rickles at a Peace Conference"; "Arsenio Hall Harasses Eddie Murphy" ("Cape Fear II")	February 2, 1992	20.6
57	18	"Hour of Power: Preachers on Trial"	"Sally Struthers: Feed the Planet"; "The Church of Discount Sin Televangelists on Trial" (featuring Chi McBride as a senator); "Down Wit' MSG" ("O.P.P." spoof; cut from DVD); "Ugly Wanda: Masseuse"	February 9, 1992	20.2
58	19	"The Fist That Rocks the Cradle"	"FOX Special: Elvis Sighting"; "Vera De Milo: The Fist that Rocks the Cradle" (featuring Mitchell Laurance as the husband); "Male Bonding in the Woods"; "House Party 3"; "Ghost II: Sammy Davis, Jr.'s Spirit"; Close featuring Eric B. & Rakim performing "Know the Ledge"	February 16, 1992	20.7
59	20	"Club Ozone"	"Club Ozone"; "Al MacAfee: McBurgers Security Guard"; "Richard Simmons' Shed-A-Bed Diet Program"; "Benita Butrell: Class Reunion"; "Men on Vacation" (repeat from Season 2, Episode 9); Close featuring Shabba Ranks with Maxi Priest performing "Housecall"	February 23, 1992	19.8
60	21	"Rodney King"	"Career Aid" (cut from DVD); "Anton: Suburban Marriage"; "Chillin'"; "Handi Man: The Sequel" (conclusion to "Handi-Man and the Tiny Avenger" from Season 3, Episode 14; featuring Debbie Lee Carrington as the Tiny Avenger)	March 1, 1992	20.9
61	22	"Player's Club"	"The Player's Club brand Billy Club"; "Snackin' Shack: President's Day"; "Act Up! Guy At the Art Gallery"; "Homey the Clown: Kindergarten Substitute Teacher"; Close featuring Black Sheep performing "The Choice Is Yours (Revisited)"	March 15, 1992	20.5
62	23	"The Last Man on Earth"	"Tester's Choice" (a.k.a. Fatal Attraction Coffee Commercial); "The Brothers Brothers on The $100,000 Pyramid"; "The Last Man on Earth"; "Men on Videotape Rentals"; Close featuring Kris Kross performing "Jump"	March 29, 1992	23.1
63	24	"Anton Gets Rich"	"MC Hammer: Too Sold Out to Quit" (cut from DVD); "Timbuk: The Last Runaway Slave" (repeat from Season 3, episode 8); "The Al Sharpton and Louis Farrakhan Comedy Hour: Haunted House" (replaces the above sketch on FXX, Aspire, and On Demand); "Rescue Whenever"; "The One Night Stand" (featuring show writer Larry Wilmore as a bar patron); "Anton Gets Rich"	April 12, 1992	17.5
Note: Released on DVD as episode 10 of Season 4.
64	25	"Men on Football"	"Wilt Chamberlain Memorial" (repeat from Season 3, episode 10); "The Al Sharpton and Louis Farrakhan Comedy Hour: Jews on First" (repeat from Season 3, episode 2); "Velma and The Burglar" (repeat from Season 3, episode 2); "Men on Football" (repeat from Season 3, episode 16); "Ugly Woman: Blind Date" (repeat from Season 3, episode 12)	April 12, 1992	N/A
Note: Best-of episode
65	26	"Michael Bolton"	Michael Bolton: "When a Man Needs a Big Hit"; MC Hammer: "Can't Touch This" (repeat from Season 1, episode 11); Crystal Waters: "My Songs Are Mindless" (repeat from Season 3, episode 9); Vanilla Ice: "White White Baby" (repeat from Season 2, episode 15); Prince Butt Out Jeans (repeat from Season 3, episode 3); Paula Abdul: "Promise of a Thin Me" (repeat from Season 3, episode 8); Jimmie Walker: "Mama's Gonna Kick Me Out" (repeat from Season 3, episode 4); Michael Jackson: "Am I Black or White" (repeat from Season 3, episode 14); Close featuring Jodeci performing "Xs We Share"	May 7, 1992	19.8
Notes: Music video special, featuring new wraparounds with T'Keyah Crystal Keymáh as Downtown Julie Brown.; This episode is not included on DVD.
66	27	"Bloopers"	"Barbara Bush Visits the Illiterates" (from Season 2, episode 10); "Benita Butrell: Class Reunion" (from Season 3, episode 20); "Tester's Choice" (from Season 3, episode 23); "Pentagon Briefing" (from Season 2, episode 17); "Crown Heights Story" (from Season 3, episode 1); "Detective Head: On Head Majesty's Secret Service" (from Season 3, episode 30); "Vera De Milo: Veracosa, Mistress of Destruction" (from Season 2, episode 12); "Male Bonding in the Woods" (from Season 3, episode 19); "My Songs are Mindless" (from Season 3, episode 9); "Timbuk: The Last Runaway Slave" (from Season 3, episode 8); "Star Trek: The Really Last Voyage" (from Season 3, episode 15); Anti-ignorance commercial shoot; "Homey the Clown: Kindergarten Substitute Teacher" (from Season 3, episode 22); "Anton in the Burbs" (from Season 2, episode 16); "Anton and The Undercover Journalist" (from Season 3, episode 11); "Fire Marshal Bill: Fire Marshall Santa" (from Season 3, episode 13); Unaired David Alan Grier sketch; "Detective Head Goes Bowling" (from Season 2, episode 22); "Lassie '90" (from Season 2, episode 9); "David Alan Grier's Tribute to Broadway" (from Season 2, episode 19); "Homey D. Clown: Homey Claus" (from Season 2, episode 12); "Homey D. Clown: When Homey Met Sally" (from Season 2, episode 2); "Ugly Wanda: Masseuse" (from Season 3, episode 18); "Les and Wes On The Run" (from Season 3, episode 8); "Star Trek: The Really Last Voyage" (from Season 3, episode 15); "Benita Butrell: Carnival Booth" (from Season 3, episode 3); "The Head Detective" (from Season 2, episode 13); Unaired Velma Mulholland sketch	April 26, 1992	20.4
Notes: Blooper episode featuring outtakes and gaffes from In Living Color sketches.; Episode closes with a dedication to the memory of Sam Kinison and the show's hair stylist Troy White.
67	28	"Cousin Elsee"	"Krazy Poly-Dente"; "Cousin Elsee"; Fly Girls dance number featuring Alex Magno; "B. S. Brothers: Hollywood Tour"; "Reality Check: Bald Men vs. Men with Hair"; "Ghost II: Sammy Davis, Jr.'s Spirit" (repeat from Season 3, episode 19; replaces the above two sketches in syndication); "Les and Wes: Go West, Les and Wes"; Close featuring Heavy D & the Boyz with Tupac Shakur and Flavor Flav performing "You Can't See What I Can See"	May 3, 1992	15.8
68	29	"Silly Cone"	"SillyCone Breast Implants"; "Benita Butrell: Delegate"; "Crazy Tom's" (featuring show writer and future cast member Marc Wilmore as Crazy Tom); "FOX Special: Elvis Sighting" (repeat from Season 3, episode 19; replaces the above sketch in syndication); "LaShawn: Museum Guide"; "Fire Marshal Bill: Space Station Safety"; Close featuring MC Lyte performing "Poor Georgie"	May 10, 1992	14.5
69	30	"Wanda on The Dating Game"	"The Law Offices of Oswald Bates"; "Detective Head: On Head Majesty's Secret Service"; "Super Clyde"; "Great Moments in Black History: The Jheri Curl" (repeat from Season 3, episode 13; replaces "Super Clyde" in syndication); "Sleazo's Pee Wee Herman Mugshot Doll and Pornhouse Playset" (repeat from Season 3, episode 1; replaces "Super Clyde" in syndication); "Ugly Woman: Dating Game"	May 17, 1992	16.1
Notes: Steve Park and Damon Wayans's last episode as cast members.; Cari French, Carrie Ann Inaba, and Lisa Marie Todd's last episode as Fly Girls.

=== Season 4 (1992–93) ===
No. overall	No. in season	Title	Sketches	Original release date	Viewers (millions)
70	1	"Rodney King and Reginald Denny Speak Out"	"Ross Perot at NAACP Meeting"; Keenen introduces the new Fly Girls and cast members in the show opener; "Fire Marshal Bill Rebuilds Los Angeles"; "Rodney King and Reginald Denny Public Service Announcement"; "Edward James Olmos Does Yardwork"; "Benita Butrell at the L.A. Riots"; Close featuring Redman performing "Blow Your Mind"	September 27, 1992	18.8
Notes: Marlon Wayans and Alexandra Wentworth's first episode as cast members.; Jossie Harris and Lisa Joann Thompson's first episode as Fly Girls.; Keenen Ivory Wayans' last on-camera appearance on the show.
71	2	"Basic Instank"	"Go on Girl with Barbara Bush and Hillary Clinton"; "Dueling Psychics"; "Snuff and Roam Go To Jail"; "Ugly Wanda in Basic Instank"	October 4, 1992	18.7
72	3	"Mr. and Mrs. Brooks"	"MTV's Political Coverage"; "Cousin Elsee at the Wake"; "Woody Allen for Date the Children"; Whitney Houston: "Got Your Babies Tonight" (cut from DVD); "Mr. and Mrs. Brooks"; Close featuring Gang Starr with Nice & Smooth performing "DWYCK"	October 11, 1992	16.6
73	4	"Black People Awards"	Vanessa Williams: "You Can All Just Kiss My Ass" (cut from DVD); "The Tonight Show with Jay Leno: Sinéad O'Connor Protesting"; "Beauty Tips with Lori Davis"; "George Hamilton Brand Luggage and Belts"; "Black Peoples Awards"; Close featuring A.D.O.R. performing "Let It All Hang Out"	October 18, 1992	16.6
74	5	"Trail Mix-a-Lot"	"Trail Mix-a-Lot" in "Baby Got Snacks" (cut from DVD); "Lonnie the Childish Adult"; "Super Bimbo"; "Def Jam Comedy Hour: Audience Reactions"; "Juice Mania"; Close featuring Grand Puba performing "360 Degrees (What Goes Around)"	October 25, 1992	16.8
75	6	"Anton Returns"	Bill Clinton in "Humpin' Around" (cut from DVD); "The Head Detective" (with guest star Damon Wayans as Detective Head); "Ice Poe: At The Airport"; "Sue Goober: 007 Bond Girl Audition" (cut from DVD); "Anton at Comic Relief" (with guest star Damon Wayans as Anton)	November 1, 1992	20.0
Note: Tommy Davidson's last sketch appearance (not counting repeat sketches) until Season 5, Episode 1 due to undergoing treatment for substance abuse.
76	7	"Homey and Son"	Shabba Ranks in "Mr. Ugly Man" (cut from DVD); "The Dysfunctional Home Show: How to Cook Pork and Beans"; "Snuff & Roam: Nightclubbing"; "Homey D. Clown: Homey's Son" (with guest star Damon Wayans as Homey); Close featuring Wreckx-n-Effect with Teddy Riley performing "Rump Shaker"	November 8, 1992	19.2
77	8	"Handi-Man Returns"	"Saturday Night Live's Chris Rock and Garrett Morris for Anonymous Express" (featuring Molly Shannon as a tourist); "Ugly Woman: Wanda Meets Luther the Ugly Man"; "Loomis Simmons: Make Me Rich!"; "Handi-Man Loses His Powers" (with guest star Damon Wayans as Handi-Man); Close featuring Pete Rock & CL Smooth performing "Straighten It Out"	November 15, 1992	14.6
78	9	"Men on Cooking"	"Prince of Munchkin Land" (cut from DVD); "Mr. & Mrs. Brooks: Thanksgiving Dinner"; "Candy Cane's Puppet Show"; "Men on Cooking" (with guest star Damon Wayans as Blaine Edwards); Close featuring Mary J. Blige performing "Reminisce"	November 22, 1992	20.7
79	10	"Gays in the Military"	Madonna in "Neurotica" (cut from DVD); "Gays in the Military" (cut from DVD); "Lil' Magic: Working Girl"; "Edwin O. Fay's Skin-Lightening Treatment (a.k.a. "Your Face is Your Passport")"; "Dracula Meets Ugly Wanda"	December 13, 1992	16.9
80	11	"Driving Miss Schott"	"Driving Miss Schott"; "An Ice Poe Christmas"; "Benita Butrell: Holiday Volunteer"; "Cephus and Reesie: Tunes for Tots"; "Why?: Black Eyewitnesses in the News"; "Al MacAfee: How MacAfee Stole Christmas"; Christmas close featuring Jamie Foxx performing "This Christmas"	December 20, 1992	17.4
Note: Keenen Ivory Wayans' final episode as a cast member.
81	12	"The Dysfunctional Home Christmas Show"	"Vera DeMilo and Little Richard: The Stank of a Woman"; "The Bodyguard with Grace Jones" (cut from DVD); "Cousin Elsee: At the Hospital"; "Why: Rap Music Used for Commercials"; "The Dysfunctional Home Show: Belated Christmas Special"; "Mr. & Mrs. Brooks Second Honeymoon"; Close featuring Digable Planets performing "Rebirth of Slick (Cool Like Dat)"	January 3, 1993	17.4
Note: Marlon Wayans' last episode as a cast member.
82	13	"Capitol Hillbillies"	"The Capitol Hillbillies"; "Benita Butrell: Physician's Office"; "Amy Fisher's 'Bang for Your Buck' Seminar"; "Tales from the Crib" (featuring Marlon Wayans as the cryptkeeper); "Ross Perot Buys Up Airtime"; "You Bet Your Career"; Close featuring Father MC performing "Everything's Gonna Be Alright"	January 17, 1993	16.7
83	14	"Michael Jackson"	"La Toya Jackson: Michael Unwrapped"; "Home Alone Again with Michael Jackson" (repeat from Season 3, episode 6); "Michael Jackson Potato Head" (repeat from Season 1, episode 10); "La Toya Jackson: Michael Unwrapped" (conclusion); "Family Feud's The Royal Family and The Jacksons" (with guest star Ray Combs as himself); Close featuring Another Bad Creation performing "Iesha" (repeat from Season 2, Episode 18)	February 6, 1993	19.6
Notes: Michael Jackson-themed episode; This episode does not air in syndication.
84	15	"The Info Group"	"Alive II: with Richard Simmons"; "Loomis Simmons' The Power Stretch"; "The Info Group"; "What If Bob Hope was Black?" (featuring Marc Wilmore as Hope); "Sgt. Stacey Koon on COPS"; "Men on Fitness" (with guest star Damon Wayans as Blaine Edwards)	February 7, 1993	17.8
Note: A.J. Jamal's first episode as a recurring featured performer.
85	16	"Valentine's Day"	"Bill Cosby's Condom Commercial" (repeat from Season 3, episode 12); "Homey D. Clown's Parole Romance" (repeat from Season 2, episode 2); "Ejector Bed" (repeat from Season 2, episode 16); "Velma on a Blind Date" (repeat from Season 2, episode 13); "Ugly Woman's One Night Stand"	February 11, 1993	17.7
Notes: In Living Color Valentine's Show; This episode does not air in syndication.
86	17	"Forever Silky"	"Oswald: Booked on Phonics" (with guest star Damon Wayans as Oswald Bates); "Forever Silky"; "Lashawn: Dry Cleaners" (with guest star Sherman Hemsley as Mr. Jefferson); "Reality Check: Singing to Aretha Franklin"; "Fire Marshall Bill: Teppanyaki Restaurant Safety"; Close featuring Arrested Development performing "Mr. Wendal"	February 14, 1993	16.8
Note: Damon Wayans's last sketch appearance (not counting repeat sketches).
87	18	"Dirty Little Dick"	"Joe Jackson: Lock You in the Closet" (cut from DVD); "Suzanne Somers for ThighMaster"; "Calhoun Tubbs: Prison Performance"; "Little Richard in: Dirty Little Dick"; "Geraldo Rivera: The Black Child Star Mill"; "Rodney Dangerfield Gets Pulled Over" (with guest star Dangerfield as himself); "Mr. & Mrs. Brooks: Garage Sale"; Close featuring Shawn Wayans as Chris Rock and Jamie Foxx as Garrett Morris	February 21, 1993	18.0
88	19	"Men On"	"Deep Sea Men"; "Rise to Stardom" (repeat of "Men on Films II" from Season 2, Episode 1; introduced by Chris Connelly); "Cliff Hanger" (excerpt from Season 2, Episode 24 and repeat of "Men on Film: Straight Man Out" from Season 3, Episode 2; introduced by Jeffrey Lyons); "Sponsors" (excerpts from Season 1, Episode 4; Season 1, Episode 7; Season 2, Episode 9; Season 3, Episode 16; Season 4, Episode 9; and Season 4, Episode 15; introduced by Michael Medved); "Ratings" (excerpts from Season 1, Episode 1; Season 1, Episode 4; Season 1, Episode 7; Season 2, Episode 9; Season 3, Episode 16; Season 4, Episode 9; and Season 4, Episode 15; introduced by Chris Connelly); "Men on Film Festival" (excerpt from Season 3, Episode 10)	February 25, 1993	16.4
Notes: Men on Film-themed best-of episode; This episode does not air in syndication.
89	20	"Passenger 227"	"Boyz II Wimps: End of the Road" (cut from DVD); "Jackée Harry in Passenger 227"; "Background Guy at the White House"; "The Dysfunctional Home Show: Wedding"; "Ugly Woman: The Fifth En Vogue Member" (with guest stars En Vogue as themselves)	February 28, 1993	18.5
90	21	"Duke and Cornbread Turner"	"Isabel Sanford's Weezies brand Throat Drops" (featuring Marc Wilmore as Sanford); "A Different Message"; "Why: Reporters Affecting Accents"; "Super Dave Dance Transition/Finale" (with guest star Super Dave Osborne as himself); "Charles Bronson's 'Make a Death Wish' Foundation"; "Super Dave Dance Transition/Finale" (conclusion); "Grandpa and Duke the Dead Dog: Best in Show"; Close featuring Naughty by Nature performing "Hip Hop Hooray"	March 7, 1993	17.1
91	22	"Mr. Rogers"	"Achy Breaky Head" (cut from DVD); "Great Moments In Black History: The First Record Scratcher"; "Al Sharpton's Hunger Strike"; "Reality Check: Bald Men vs. Men with Hair" (repeat from Season 3, episode 28); "What If Archie Bunker was Black?" (would later become "All Up in the Family" in the fifth season; featuring Marc Wilmore as Bunker); "Mr. Rogers: Insufferable Prick" (a.k.a. "Mr. Rogers at the Video Store"); Close featuring Heavy D & the Boyz performing "Truthful"	March 14, 1993	18.8
Note: Tupac Shakur was originally scheduled to perform during the close, but was arrested that night following a fight outside the show's production office.
92	23	"Rodney King"	"Rodney King and Reginald Denny PSA" (repeat from Season 4, episode 1); "Why? Black Eyewitnesses" (repeat from Season 4, episode 11); "Oswald: Booked on Phonics" (repeat from Season 4, episode 17); "Ross Perot Buys Up Airtime" (repeat from Season 4, episode 13); "Driving Miss Schott" (repeat from Season 4, episode 11); "Beauty Tips with Lori Davis" (repeat from Season 4, episode 4); "Trail Mix-a-Lot" in "Baby Got Snacks" (repeat from Season 4, episode 5; cut from DVD); "Ugly Wanda: Dracula" (repeat from Season 4, episode 10)	March 21, 1993	17.8
Note: Best-of episode
93	24	"Black People Show"	"What If Barbra Streisand was Black?"; "Al MacAfee: Metal Detector at School"; "Sheila Peace: Employment Agency"; "Lashawn: Makeover"; "The Black People's Show" (with guest star Jenifer Lewis as Tonya Hodges); Close featuring Prince Markie Dee & The Soul Convention performing "Typical Reasons (Swing My Way)"	April 4, 1993	12.6
94	25	"Stacey Koon's Police Academy"	"Reality Check: Dancing Like The Fly Girls" (cut from DVD); "Baby Lonnie at the Doctor"; "Overly Confident Gay Man Comes Out"; "Snookie" (with guest star Jenifer Lewis as Snookie); "Sgt. Koon's Police Academy" (featuring Molly Shannon as a cadet); Close featuring Da Youngsta's performing "Crewz Pop"	April 25, 1993	13.5
95	26	"Commercial Parodies"	"The Player's Club brand Billy Club" (repeat from Season 3, episode 22); "SillyCone Brand Breast Implants" (repeat from Season 3, episode 29); "Vera De Milo: Milk Commercial" (repeat from Season 3, episode 6); "Sally Struthers: Feed the Planet" (repeat from Season 3, episode 18); "Tes-T-Shields Masculine Hygiene Pads" (repeat from Season 3, episode 12); "Muttco's Coyote Ugly One-Night Stand Escape Kit" (repeat from Season 3, episode 6); "George Hamilton Luggage and Belts" (repeat from Season 4, episode 4); "Amy Fisher's "Bang For Your Buck" Seminar" (repeat from Season 4, episode 13); "Juicemania" (repeat from Season 4, episode 5)	April 29, 1993	12.5
Notes: Best-of episode (In Living Color's Best Commercial Parodies); This episode does not air in syndication.
96	27	"Undigable Hosts"	"Arsenio Hall, Whoopi Goldberg, and Jay Leno: Undigable Hosts" (cut from DVD); "Loomis Simmons: Psychic Hotline"; "MTV's Teen Court"; "James Brown in The Groom Room" (with guest star Brown as himself); "Carl "The Tooth" Williams"; Close featuring Showbiz and A.G. with Dres performing "Bounce Ta This"	May 2, 1993	13.3
97	28	"Night at the Movies"	"The Superfly" (repeat from Season 2, episode 20); "El Grande Y Spectacular Muchacho Rocketeer" ("The Mexican Rocketeer") (repeat from Season 3, episode 3); "My Left Foot of Fury" (repeat from Season 3, episode 10); "Oswald: Silence of the Lambs II" (repeat from Season 3, episode 2); "Passenger 227" (repeat from Season 4, episode 20); "Ugly Wanda in Basic Instank II" (repeat from Season 4, episode 2)	May 6, 1993	11.6
Notes: Best-of episode (In Living Color's "Night at the Movies"); This episode does not air in syndication.
98	29	"Thelma and Louise Jefferson"	"Heterosexual Pride Parade"; "Reality Check: Wearing a Bikini" (does not air on Aspire); "Calhoun Tubbs: Chuck E. Cheddar"; "Thelma & Louise Jefferson" (featuring Marc Wilmore as Louise Jefferson and Brian George as Mr. Bentley); "Mrs. Sheridan's Phone Call" (with guest star Jenifer Lewis as Mrs. Sheridan); "Ugly Wanda: The Queen of the Old West" (with guest star Mario Van Peebles as a posse member); Close featuring Onyx performing "Slam"	May 9, 1993	10.4
99	30	"Celebrity Impersonations"	"Elvis Sighting" (repeat from Season 3, episode 19); "What If Bob Hope Were Black?" (repeat from Season 4, episode 15); "Woody Allen: Date The Children" (repeat from Season 4, episode 3); "Jay Leno" (repeat from Season 4, episode 4); "You Bet Your Career" (repeat from Season 4, episode 13); Close featuring Shawn Wayans as Chris Rock and Jamie Foxx as Garrett Morris (repeat from Season 4, episode 18)	May 13, 1993	11.0
Notes: Celebrity-themed best-of episode; This episode does not air in syndication.
100	31	"Bunny Clive"	"Grandpa and Duke the Dead Dog: Beer Commercial Audition"; "Vera De Milo: Breasts Of Fury!"; "Snackin' Shack: Eligible Bachelor"; "Bunny & Clive: Incompetent Teenage Thugs"; "The Dysfunctional Home Show: Grandma's Funeral"; Close featuring The Pharcyde performing "Passin' Me By"	May 16, 1993	16.6
101	32	"In Living Color's Feedback Line"	"Joe Jackson: Rock 'Em Sock 'Em Jacksons"; "In Living Color Complaint Line"; "Lashawn: Beauty Shop" (with guest star LaWanda Page as Grandma); "Why? Star Trek Aliens Portrayed By Black People" (featuring Molly Shannon as an Enterprise crew member); "B.S. Brothers: Big Break" (repeat from Season 2, Episode 14); "In Living Color Complaint Line #2"; "The Champ: The Tooth Goes to Senate" (featuring Larry Wilmore as a doctor); "In Living Color Complaint Line #3"	May 23, 1993	12.3
Notes: Kelly Coffield, Kim Wayans, and Shawn Wayans' final episode as cast members.; Jennifer Lopez's last episode as a Fly Girl.; A.J. Jamal's last episode as a recurring featured performer.

=== Season 5 (1993–94) ===
No. overall	No. in season	Title	Sketches	Original release date	Viewers (millions)
103	1	"Ike Strikes Back"	"Ike Turner Strikes Back" (a.k.a. "You Done Lied; Nothin's True to It") (cut from DVD); The new cast members are introduced in the show opener; "Russell Simmons' Def Strawberry Jam"; "Seinfeld in the 'Hood"; "Kim & Sammy: Korean Grocer Puppet"; "Ugly Wanda: Wanda Gives Birth"	September 16, 1993	14.5
Notes: Anne-Marie Johnson, Jay Leggett, Carol Rosenthal, and Marc Wilmore's first episode as cast members.; Laurieann Gibson and Masako Willis' first episode as Fly Girls.
104	2	"The Dirty Dozens"	"Michael Jackson: Little Billy's Not My Lover" (featuring Denise Richards as Brooke Shields; cut from DVD); "The Dirty Dozens Game Show" (featuring show writer Nick Bakay as host Stu Dunfy); "Ball Park Breast and Butt Implants"; "Baptist Church Revival Olympics"; "Fire Marshal Bill at the Hospital"	September 23, 1993	14.2
Note: Reggie McFadden appears as a recurring guest star beginning with this episode.
105	3	"Ike Turner and Hooch"	"Snow: Impostor" (cut from DVD); "Ike Turner & Hooch/FOX News Special Report: The Reginald Denny Riots"; "The Honeymooners" '93: New Jack Swing Dancing; "Cheap Pete at the Convenience Store" (with guest star Chris Rock as Cheap Pete); "Ace and Main Man" Meet Tupac (with guest star Tupac as himself)	September 30, 1993	13.0
106	4	"Unpoetic Justice"	"Loomis Simmons: Knock You Up"; "Prison Cable Network: Mr. Cell Block Beauty Pageant" (cut from DVD); "An Apology from the Denny's Spokeswomen"; "Unpoetic Justice"; "Carl 'The Tooth' Williams: Shot at the Title" (with guest star Thomas Hearns as himself); "Funky Finger Productions" a.k.a. "B.S. Brothers: Talk Show"; This episode does not air in syndication.	October 7, 1993	13.0
Note: David Edwards' first episode as a recurring featured performer.
107	5	"The Irish Singer"	"The Los Angeles Riots Anniversary Show" (cut from DVD; the FXX and Aspire versions inexplicably cut out the beginning of Rodney King's song near the end of the sketch, where he mentions driving down Foothill Boulevard; featuring Nick Bakay as Laurence Powell); "NBA Fan Harasses Player" (with guest star Chris Rock as the fan); "The Depressed Irish Singer at the Mental Hospital"; "FOX Sports: The Anorexic Sumo Wrestler"; "Deronda and Pookie Play House”; "Wanda and her Baby, Part 2: The Detective"; "MTV Unplugged: Jodeci" (cut from DVD)	October 14, 1993	11.5
108	6	"Droop! There It Is"	"Hag Team: Droop! There It Is" (cut from DVD); "Rush and Al's Big and Loud Men's Clothes Store"; "Background Guy: The FOX Newsroom"; "A Few Minutes with Randy Rooney" (a.k.a. "What If Andy Rooney Were Black?"); "Cheap Pete at the Bar" (with guest star Chris Rock as Cheap Pete); "Ace and the Main Man" (with guest star Marsha Warfield as herself); Close featuring Guru with N'Dea Davenport performing "Trust Me"	October 21, 1993	13.0
109	7	"Circus of the Black Stars"	"Wanda and Her Baby, Part 3: Wanda Writes in her Diary"; "Carl 'The Tooth' Williams: Rocky Parody" (cut from DVD); "Circus of the Black Stars"; "Magnifico Lets Himself Go"; "Fire Marshal Bill: Magic Show Safety" (the FXX and Aspire reruns edit out Fire Marshall Bill's line that implies he and an Arab man named Abdul were involved with the 1993 World Trade Center bombing); Close featuring Leaders of the New School performing "What's Next"	October 28, 1993	14.3
110	8	"Sam Kinison: Live From Hell"	"Wanda and Her Baby, Part 4A: Ugly Wanda at the Door"; "HBO's Sam Kinison: Live From Hell"; "AT&T Frequent Caller Plan" (a.k.a. "Tiny the Obscene Phone Caller"); "Wanda and Her Baby, Part 4B: Ugly Wanda at the Door"; "Insensitive Therapist (a.k.a. Dr. Inappropriato)"; "The Dirty Dozens II" (featuring Nick Bakay as Stu Dunfy); "Wanda and Her Baby, Part 4C: Ugly Wanda at the Door"; Close featuring Lords of the Underground performing a medley of "Chief Rocka" and "Here Come the Lords"	November 4, 1993	12.4
Note: David Edwards' last episode as a recurring featured performer.
111	9	"All Up in the Family"	"Rush and Al's 'Can't We All Just Sweat Along?' Gym and Home Fitness Program"; "All Up In The Family: Gloria's Jamaican Boyfriend"; "The Waiter Who Knows Too Many Specials"; "Wanda and Her Baby: Wanda Meets Barry Bonds" (with guest star Bonds as himself); "East Hollywood Squares II" (with guest stars Peter Marshall and Gary Coleman as themselves)	November 11, 1993	10.8
Note: Greer Barnes' first episode as a recurring featured performer.
112	10	"Wile E. Coyote on Trial"	"The Background Guy: Streetside Crime Scene"; "Wile E. Coyote: Cartoon Violence Trial"; "Go On Girl: Madonna's Effect on Women's Progress"; "Candy Cane Kids Show: Candy and Benny the Dinosaur"; "The Honeymooners '93": The New Boss	November 18, 1993	12.7
113	11	"Umbilical Barry"	"Vera DeMilo: I Need a Buffneck" (cut from DVD); "Carl the Tooth Williams Parachutes In"; "Pavarotti's New Back-Up Singers" (cut from DVD); "What If The Menendez Brothers Were Black?"; "Lorena Bobbit for the Deboner 2000"; "Sammy and the Man: The Police Officer Puppet"; "Umbilical Barry at the College Party"; Close featuring Us3 performing "Cantaloop (Flip Fantasia)"	December 2, 1993	10.7
114	12	"Mary Tyler Mo"	"B.E.T. Fall Lineup: The Mary Tyler Mo' Sho'; "Loomis Simmons: Custom Built Condoms"; "Depressed Irish Singer at the Men's Homeless Shelter"; "Geraldo: Illegitimate Black Children of White Celebrities"; "Ace and Main Man Meet Johnny Gill" (with guest star Gill as himself); Close featuring Patra with Lyn Collins performing "Think (About It)"	December 16, 1993	11.1
Note: Reggie McFadden's first episode as an official cast member.
115	13	"Wheel of Dozens"	"Joe Jackson's Never Neverland Sale"; "Mr. Armstrong, The Dead-Armed Substitute Teacher"; "A Few Minutes with Randy Rooney"; "Deronda and Pookie Play Office"; "Wheel of Dozens" (featuring Nick Bakay as Stu Dunfy)	December 30, 1993	11.5
116	14	"The Gangsta Group"	"Sister Act 3: This Ain't Kosher"; "Background Guy: Bigfoot Sighting Report"; "The Gangsta Group"; "The Waiter Who Knows Way Too Many Specials: Airline Meals"; "Grandpa and Duke the Dead Dog: Police Dog Training"	January 13, 1994	11.3
Note: Carl Banks' first episode as a recurring featured performer.
117	15	"East Hollywood Squares"	"Marlee Matlin Sings & Raps Deaf Def Jams" (cut from DVD); "Cheap Pete On A Date" (with guest star Chris Rock as Cheap Pete); "AWF's Tag-Team Wrestling: Rush & Al vs. Howard Stern & Robin Quivers"; "East Hollywood Squares" (with guest stars Peter Marshall and Fred Berry as themselves)	January 27, 1994	11.7
118	16	"Hemorrhoid Guy"	"Tonya Harding for The Club"; "All Up In The Family: Cross-Eyed Boss' White Wife"; "John Bobbit: The New Six Million Dollar Man"; "Hemorrhoid Guy: Stuck in the Operating Room" (with guest stars Chris Rock as Cheap Pete and Biz Markie as a window washer); "Ugly Wanda and Her Uglier Sister" (with guest star Biz Markie as Wanda's uglier sister, Judy)	February 3, 1994	12.6
119	17	"The White League"	"Tonya Harding: Mark Jackson Free Throw" (with guest star Jackson as himself); "The B.S. Brothers Pitch Shoes" (with guest stars Isiah Thomas, John Starks, Charles Oakley, Anthony Bonner, Anthony Mason, Herb Williams, and Patrick Ewing as themselves); "Rap Masterpiece Theater: Rap Lyric Dramatic Readings" (cut from DVD); "The White League" (with guest stars Roy Firestone, Danny Manning, Vlade Divac, and James Worthy as themselves); "Run PMS: Wanna Man" (cut from DVD); "Ace And Main Man Meet Kareem Abdul-Jabbar" (with guest star Abdul-Jabbar as himself); Close featuring Shaquille O'Neal, followed by the video for his song "I'm Outstanding"	February 10, 1994	12.2
120	18	"Mrs. Ikefire"	"Mrs Ikefire"; "East Hollywood Squares III" (with guest stars Peter Marshall and Pam Grier as themselves); "Background Guy: Spring Break Report"; "Dirty Dozens Home Game" (featuring Nick Bakay as Stu Dunfy); "Fire Marshall Bill: Honeymoon Hotel"	February 17, 1994	12.4
121	19	"Dirty Dozens Tournament of Champions"	"Risky Business II: The Menendez Brothers" (featuring Nick Bakay as Lyle Menendez; cut from DVD); "Carl 'The Tooth' Williams's Paternity Suit" (with guest star Biz Markie as Williams' friend); "San Francisco" (Philadelphia parody, with guest star Chris Rock as one of the gay attorneys); "Dirty Dozens Tournament Of Champions" (featuring Nick Bakay as Stu Dunfy, with guest stars Biz Markie as contestant "Foosball" Franklin and Ed O'Neill as himself)	February 24, 1994	12.4
122	20	"Thugs"	"Dr Kervorkian's Home Remedies"; "Great Moments In Black History: The First Def Comedy Jam"; "Thugs" (parody of COPS; coincidentally, Saturday Night Live had a similar sketch on the season 19 episode hosted by Martin Lawrence); "Proud Gay Man at a Burger Joint"; "Sweet Tooth Jones: The Hollywood School of Self-Defense"; Close featuring Simple E performing "Play My Funk"	March 10, 1994	13.0
123	21	"Academy Awards"	"Loomis Simmons: Make Him Jealous!" (with guest star Biz Markie as "Albert Einstein"); "66th Annual Academy Awards Highlights"; "Grandpa and Duke: Beethoven's Sidekick Audition"; "Cheap Pete Gets Married" (with guest star Chris Rock as Cheap Pete); "Umbilical Barry Rides the Subway"; "Hemorrhoid Patient: Stuck in the Hallway"; Close featuring Eazy-E with Dresta and B.G. Knocc Out performing "Real Compton City G's"	March 24, 1994	12.6
Note: Greer Barnes' last episode as a recurring featured performer.
124	22	"The Scary Larry Show"	"Rush And Al's Greatest Hits" (cut from DVD); "Cheap Pete At The Carnival" (with guest star Chris Rock as Cheap Pete); "Loomis Simmons: Let Me Harass You!"; "The Scary Larry Show" (a.k.a. The Vietnam Vet Kids' Show Host); "East Hollywood Squares IV" (with guest star Peter Marshall as himself); Close featuring Souls of Mischief performing "93 'til Infinity"	April 7, 1994	10.8
125	23	"Sweet Tooth Jones"	"Snoop Dogg: Drivin' Down the Street" (cut from DVD); "Sweet Tooth Jones: Sexual Harassment Seminar"; "Ed Baker, The Insensitive Guidance Counselor" (with guest star Biz Markie as student Marlin Kane); "Ugly Wanda: Bachelor Auction" (with guest star Luther Vandross as himself); Close featuring Boss performing "Progress of Elimination"	April 28, 1994	13.0
126	24	"Candy Cane's Last Show"	"Rap Masterpiece Theatre: Rap Lyric Dramatic Readings II" (cut from DVD); "Candy Cane: Candy Gets Replaced"; "Grandpa & Duke the Dead Dog: A Time for Love"; "Family Dozens" (featuring Nick Bakay as Stu Dunfy)	May 5, 1994	10.9
127	25	"Infomercial Awards"	"Mustang Brothel for Vista Credit Cards" (does not air on Aspire); "Wile E. Coyote's Mall Appearance"; "Infomercial Awards"; "All Up in the Family: Gay Barney"; "Deronda and Pookie Play Party"; "The B.S. Brothers: Gangsta Rappers"; Close featuring Meshell Ndegeocello performing "If That's Your Boyfriend (He Wasn't Last Night)"	May 12, 1994	9.1
128	26	TBA	"Background Guy: Haunted House Report" (cut from DVD); "The Champ Goes Back to School"; "Prison Cable Network: Lights Out with the Angel"; "Ace and Main Man Meet Salt 'n' Pepa." (with guest stars Salt-N-Pepa as themselves); Close featuring To Be Continued performing "One on One"	May 19, 1994	11.7
Notes: Series Finale: Carl Banks' last episode as a recurring featured performer.; Jim Carrey, Tommy Davidson, Jamie Foxx, David Alan Grier, Anne-Marie Johnson, T’Keyah “Crystal” Keymah, Jay Leggett, Reggie McFadden, Carol Rosental, Alexandra Wentworth, and Marc Wilmore's last episode as cast members.; Laurieann Gibson, Masako Willis, Lisa Thompson, Jossie Harris and Deidre Lang's last episode as Fly Girls.; Leroy “Twist” Casey's last episode as a DJ.

== Live performances ==
=== Season 2 ===
- Queen Latifah
- Monie Love
- Heavy D & the Boyz
- 3rd Bass
- D-Nice
- Nikki D
- Rich Nice
- Leaders of the New School
- Another Bad Creation
- KRS-One
- Public Enemy with Ice Cube
- The Afros

=== Season 3 ===
- Leaders of the New School
- Nice & Smooth
- Big Daddy Kane
- Queen Latifah
- A Tribe Called Quest
- Color Me Badd
- Eric B. & Rakim
- Shabba Ranks with Maxi Priest
- Black Sheep
- Kris Kross
- Jodeci
- Heavy D & the Boyz with 2Pac and Flavor Flav
- MC Lyte

=== Season 4 ===
- Redman
- Gang Starr with Nice & Smooth
- A.D.O.R.
- Grand Puba
- Wreckx-n-Effect with Teddy Riley
- Pete Rock & CL Smooth
- Mary J. Blige
- Jamie Foxx
- Digable Planets
- Father MC
- Another Bad Creation
- Arrested Development
- Naughty by Nature
- Heavy D & the Boyz
- Prince Markie Dee & The Soul Convention
- Da Youngsta's
- Showbiz and A.G. with Dres
- Onyx
- The Pharcyde

=== Season 5 ===
- Guru with N'Dea Davenport
- Leaders of the New School
- Lords of the Underground
- Us3
- Patra with Lyn Collins
- Simple E
- Eazy-E with Dresta and B.G. Knocc Out
- Souls of Mischief
- Boss
- Meshell Ndegeocello
- To Be Continued
