= List of In Living Color cast members =

American sketch comedy TV series, 1990–1994

Cast members came and went during the run of In Living Color (Fox-TV, 1990–1994). Some earlier cast members continued to appear in later seasons so later casts also include some previous years' cast members.

== First season (1990) ==
- Keenen Ivory Wayans
- Jim Carrey (credited as James Carrey)
- Kelly Coffield
- Kim Coles
- Tommy Davidson
- David Alan Grier
- T'Keyah Crystal Keymáh
- Damon Wayans
- Kim Wayans
- Shawn Wayans (as DJ SW-1) and the Fly Girls
- DJ Daddy Mack (pilot only)

== Second season (1990–1991) ==
- Keenen Ivory Wayans
- Jim Carrey
- Kelly Coffield
- Tommy Davidson
- David Alan Grier
- T'Keyah Crystal Keymáh
- Damon Wayans
- Kim Wayans
- Shawn Wayans (as DJ SW-1) and the Fly Girls

== Third season (1991–1992) ==
Starring

- Keenen Ivory Wayans
- Jim Carrey
- Kelly Coffield
- Tommy Davidson
- David Alan Grier
- T'Keyah Crystal Keymáh
- Damon Wayans
- Kim Wayans

Featuring

- Jamie Foxx
- Steve Park
- Shawn Wayans
- DJ Twist and the Fly Girls

== Fourth season (1992–1993) ==
Starring

- Keenen Ivory Wayans (episodes 1–11 only)
- Jim Carrey
- Kelly Coffield
- Tommy Davidson
- David Alan Grier
- T'Keyah Crystal Keymáh
- Kim Wayans

Featuring

- Damon Wayans (4 episodes only)
- Jamie Foxx
- Marlon Wayans (episodes 1–13 only)
- Shawn Wayans
- Alexandra Wentworth
- DJ Twist and the Fly Girls

== Fifth season (1993–1994) ==
- Jim Carrey
- Tommy Davidson
- Jamie Foxx
- David Alan Grier
- Anne-Marie Johnson
- T'Keyah Crystal Keymáh
- Reggie McFadden (episodes 12-26)
- Jay Leggett
- Carol Rosenthal
- Alexandra Wentworth
- Marc Wilmore
- DJ Twist and the Fly Girls

Jim Carrey, Tommy Davidson, David Alan Grier and T'Keyah Crystal Keymáh were the only cast members for all five seasons.

== Guest stars ==
Chris Rock was never an official cast member on In Living Color, but did appear (as a "special guest star") in a number of skits in the fifth season, and reprised his "Cheap Pete" character from I'm Gonna Git You Sucka. In the early years of In Living Color, Rock was parodied as being the only African American cast member on Saturday Night Live (SNL also had Tim Meadows and Ellen Cleghorne). In an SNL skit honoring Mother's Day, Rock's mother jokes that she is disappointed in him for being on SNL, and asks "Has In Living Color called yet?" (and later, when Adam Sandler hosted, Chris Rock sang about how he got fired from SNL and kicked off In Living Color when the latter show got canceled).

Other recurring guest stars in the fifth season include show writer Nick Bakay (for The Dirty Dozens sketches) and Peter Marshall (ringmaster for several urban parodies of Hollywood Squares). Rapper Biz Markie also appeared in various roles as a guest star in the fifth season, such as being (not too much) in drag as Wanda the Ugly Woman's sister or as "Dirty Dozens" contestant Damian "Foosball" Franklin.

== Fly Girls (house dance troupe) ==
The Fly Girls troupe had various members over In Living Color's five-season run. The original lineup consisted of Cari French, Carrie Ann Inaba, Deidre Lang, Lisa Marie Todd, and Michelle Whitney-Morrison. Rosie Perez was the choreographer for the first four seasons. Lang was the only Fly Girl to stay for the entire run.

Sometimes the Fly Girls could be used as extras in sketches, or be part of an opening gag (in one sketch, they were shown performing open-heart surgery and revealed that they were dancing in order to pay their way through medical school), though, mostly, the Fly Girls appeared in commercial break bumpers and filler scenes in between sketches (not unlike the bikini-clad female cast members on Rowan and Martin's Laugh-In).

In the fifth season Arthur Rainer became the main choreographer with Lisa Joann Thompson and Deidre Lang as assistant choreographers.

- Cari French: Seasons 1–3 (1990–1992)
- Carla Garrido: part of Season 2 (1991)
- Laurie Ann Gibson: Season 5 (1993–1994)
- Jossie Harris: Seasons 4–5 (1992–1994)
- Carrie Ann Inaba: Seasons 1–3 (1990–1992)
- Deidre Lang: Seasons 1–5 (1990–1994)
- Jennifer Lopez: Seasons 3–4 (1991–1993)
- Lisa Joann Thompson: Seasons 4–5 (1992–1994)
- Lisa Marie Todd: Seasons 1–3 (1990–1992)
- Michelle Whitney-Morrison: Seasons 1–2 (1990–1991)
- Masako Willis: Season 5 (1993–1994)
