= Gun (TV series) =

- Genre: Anthology
- Created by: James Steven Sadwith
- Opening theme: "Happiness Is a Warm Gun" by U2
- Country of origin: United States
- Original language: English
- No. of seasons: 1
- No. of episodes: 6

Production
- Executive producer: Robert Altman
- Running time: 60 minutes
- Production companies: Sadwith Productions; Sandcastle 5 Productions; The Kushner-Locke Company

Original release
- Network: ABC
- Release: April 12 – May 31, 1997

Gun is an American television anthology series which followed a gun as it was passed from owner to owner. The show aired on ABC on Saturday nights from April 12 to May 31, 1997. The series lasted six episodes, each directed by a well-known director, before being cancelled.

== Summary ==
Each episode involves a pearl-handled .45 semi-automatic pistol as an important part of the plot. The characters in each episode are completely different and unrelated to those who appear in other episodes. The series was produced by Robert Altman and attracted numerous recognizable stars including Fred Ward, Kathy Baker, Carrie Fisher, Daryl Hannah, Randy Quaid, Martin Sheen and James Gandolfini in his first television role.

== Episodes ==
No.	Title	Directed by	Original release date	Prod. code
1	"The Shot"	James Foley	April 12, 1997	TBA
A family moving from Los Angeles has their life turned upside down when thugs try to rob the convenience store where they have briefly stopped. This episode uses the same technique as the story An Occurrence at Owl Creek Bridge. Cast : John Asher, Dwayne Adway, Erick Avari, Kathy Baker, Ed Begley Jr., Adam Clark, Clint Howard, Kathy Ireland, Suzanne Krull, Clayton Landey, Lawrence LeJohn, Reggie McFadden, Zachary McLemore, Santos Morales, Andrew Shaifer, Daniel Stern, Kathleen Sullivan, Alek Talevich, Dara Tomanovich, Eddie Velez, Tom Verica, Donald Willis.
2	"Ricochet"	Peter Horton	April 19, 1997	106
The last case for retiring cop Van Guinness involves the death of a Japanese businessman. Circumstantial evidence points to the man's cold-hearted second wife, but Van Guinness can't make a move until he finds the murder weapon. Cast : Kirk Baltz, Bud Cort, Ken Enomoto, Tess Harper, Jim Ishida, Jeremy Jordan, Jim Lau, Ken Lerner, Tawny Little, Chris McDonald, Julio Oscar Mechoso, Saemi Nakamura, Setsuko Niwa Fuji, William Lee Scott, Martin Sheen, Nancy Travis, Wil Wheaton, Albert Wong.
3	"Columbus Day"	James Steven Sadwith	May 3, 1997	104
A housewife drifts into an affair with an author suffering from writer's block. Complicating matters is her overprotective husband, who owns a gun that, unbeknownst to him, could be used as evidence against a terrorist. Cast : Rosanna Arquette, James Gandolfini, Peter Horton, Chaim Jerrafi, Tim deZarn, Jack McGee, Tom Wright, Wayne Ward, Rolando Molina, Gerry Black, Steve Callas, James DiStefano, Alexander Folk, Stephen Liska, Akiko Morison, Skip O'Brien, Chelsea Russo, Michael Yama.
4	"All the President's Women"	Robert Altman	May 10, 1997	102
After the death of a golf-club president, womanizer Bill Johnson is elected the new leader. But though he's now in charge at the club, he's losing his grip on the many women he's seeing. Cast : Daryl Hannah, Sally Kellerman, Tina Lifford, Randy Quaid, Jennifer Tilly, Sean Young, Robert André, Dirk Blocker, John Considine, Nicolas Coster, Robert Do'Qui, Dina Spybey, Troy D. Bryant, Kathryn Tucker.
5	"The Hole"	Ted Demme	May 24, 1997	103
A young man leads a tortured existence after apparently killing his lover. Cast : Rutanya Alda, Drake Bell, Cliff Bemis, Bill Bolender, Polly Cusumano, Ted Demme, Greg Dulli, Kirsten Dunst, Troy Evans, Carrie Fisher, Max Gail, Donal Logue, Ken Ober, Joe Pichler, Leon Rippy, Gregory Sporleder, Johnny Whitworth.
6	"Father John"	Jeremiah S. Chechik	May 31, 1997	105
A priest's cynical nephew returns home for his uncle's funeral. But his hero worship turns to intense curiosity when he discovers a large sum of money and a gun among his uncle's possessions. Cast : Brooke Adams, Maria Conchita Alonso, Angela Alvarado, Adriano González, Edward James Olmos, Tony Plana, Loyda Ramos, Fred Ward, Mel Winkler.

== See also ==
- Winchester '73
