= Reggie McFadden =

American comedian and actor (1968–2026)

- Born: November 30, 1968; New York City, U.S.
- Died: October 2026 (aged 57); Dodoma, Tanzania
- Occupations: Comedian; actor; writer
- Years active: 1990–2003
- Children: 2

Reggie McFadden (November 30, 1968 – October 2026) was an American comedian, actor and writer. He was best known for his work on the television sketch comedy series In Living Color and Def Comedy Jam. McFadden also appeared in television series including Martin, Coach, and Curb Your Enthusiasm, as well as the films Jacob's Ladder, The Inkwell, Little Nicky, and Road Kings.

== Early life ==
McFadden was born in Brooklyn, New York City on November 30, 1968. He had two sisters, Bernice and Misty, and a brother, Kris. He rode trains all the way to their last stops in order to explore outside neighborhoods and abandoned buildings and to interact with people he did not know. McFadden then incorporated stories from these experiences at the start of his comedy career.

He began developing his comedy at the age of 18. Much of his early experience came from performing at open-mic nights in Manhattan coffeehouses, where aspiring comedians tested their material. He subsequently progressed to performances at established comedy clubs.

== Career ==
=== Stand-up comedy ===
McFadden developed a stand-up style that combined jokes and anecdotes with role-playing and physical performance. He was described as a 23-year-old comedian performing with Russell Simmons Def Comedy Jam, alongside Bill Bellamy and Adele Givens, with his style fast-paced and outrageous and with use of physical acting in his routines.

His major national breakthrough came through Def Comedy Jam. According to later biographical accounts, he received an invitation to perform on the HBO comedy series in 1991. By 1993, he was performing with the touring version of Def Comedy Jam whenever the tour traveled to his area.

In 1996, McFadden performed at the Just for Laughs festival in Montreal. That same year, he appeared on Late Show with David Letterman, a performance he described as a longtime ambition. He said he had auditioned for the program twelve times before being booked.

He later headlined comedy-club engagements, including a scheduled November 1997 appearance at the Improv at Harrah's Lake Tahoe.

In 1998, McFadden received his own half-hour episode of Comedy Central Presents. The episode aired on December 15, 1998.

=== Acting ===
McFadden made his film debut with a small role as a partygoer in Adrian Lyne's 1990 psychological thriller Jacob's Ladder. He subsequently moved into television, appearing in several sitcoms.

In 1993, McFadden appeared as Ricky Thompson on Martin, as Trey on Hangin' with Mr. Cooper, and as Tyler Roberts on Coach. The Los Angeles Times reported in 1996 that his appearance on Martin had been his major acting break and that it led to additional television work. That same year, McFadden joined the cast of the Fox sketch comedy series In Living Color as a regular performer and writer for its fifth and final season, appearing in 23 episodes.

His subsequent screen work included the film The Inkwell (1994), in which he played MC Madman, and appearances in Moesha, Gun, Getting Personal, Curb Your Enthusiasm, Little Nicky, and Road Kings.

On Curb Your Enthusiasm, McFadden appeared in 2001 as Police Officer #2. His film role in Road Kings (2003) was credited as Psycho. The film had previously been titled Road Dogs.

== Later life and death ==
McFadden was the father of two sons, Jaron and Myles.

He lived in Dodoma, Tanzania during the last eighteen years of his life, and became involved in entertainment and gold mining in the country. He founded Olduvai Records, described as a record label and private gold-mining company. He released an album titled ENJOY, Vol. 1 on the label in May 2025.

McFadden died in Dodoma in October 2026, at the age of 57, with his sister Bernice confirming his death after the family was notified by the U.S. State Department.

== Filmography ==
=== Film ===
Film
Year	Title	Role
1990	Jacob's Ladder	Partygoer
1991	The Color of Love	
1994	The Inkwell	MC Madman
2000	Little Nicky	Dad
2003	Road Kings	Psycho

=== Television ===
Television
Year	Title	Role	Notes
1993	Coach	Tyler Roberts	1 episode
1993	Hangin' with Mr. Cooper	Trey	1 episode
1993	Viva Cabaret		1 episode
1993	Martin	Ricky Thompson	1 episode
1993–1994	In Living Color	Various	23 episodes
1996	Moesha	Scalper	1 episode
1997	Gun	Thug #3	1 episode
1998	Getting Personal	Eric / Eric Russell	2 episodes
2001	Curb Your Enthusiasm	Police Officer #2	1 episode
