= In Living Color =

American sketch comedy television series (1990–1994)

- Genre: Variety; Sketch comedy
- Created by: Keenen Ivory Wayans
- Starring: List of In Living Color cast members
- Theme music composer: Bosco Kante
- Opening theme: "In Living Color" by Heavy D and Eddie F (seasons 1–2, 5); "Cause That's the Way You Livin' When You're in Living Color" by Heavy D and The Boyz (seasons 3–4)
- Composer: Tom Rizzo
- Country of origin: United States
- Original language: English
- No. of seasons: 5
- No. of episodes: 127 (list of episodes)

Production
- Executive producers: Keenen Ivory Wayans; Greg Fields; Les Firestein; Joe Davola; Pam Veasey
- Producers: Tamara Rawitt; Kevin Berg; Robert Jason
- Running time: 22–24 minutes
- Production companies: Ivory Way Productions; 20th Century Fox Television (1990–1992) (seasons 1–3); 20th Television (1992–1994) (seasons 4–5)

Original release
- Network: Fox
- Release: April 15, 1990 – May 19, 1994

In Living Color is an American sketch comedy television series that originally ran on Fox from April 15, 1990, to May 19, 1994. Keenen Ivory Wayans created, wrote and starred in the program. The show was produced by Ivory Way Productions in association with 20th Television and was taped at stage 7 at the Metromedia Square on Sunset Boulevard in Hollywood, Los Angeles, California.

The title of the series was inspired by the NBC announcement of broadcasts being presented "in living color" during the 1960s, prior to mainstream color television. It also refers, in the sense of the term "person of color", to the fact that most of the show's cast was African Americans, unlike other popular sketch comedy shows such as Saturday Night Live, whose casts were mostly white at the time. In Living Color portrayed a form of irreverent Black humor in a time when mainstream American tastes regarding Black comedy on television had been set by inoffensive family-friendly shows such as The Cosby Show, causing an eventual feud for control between Fox executives and the Wayanses.

Other members of the Wayans family—Damon, Kim, Shawn, and Marlon—had regular roles, while brother Dwayne frequently appeared as an extra. The show also starred several previously unknown comedians and actors, including Jamie Foxx, Jim Carrey, Tommy Davidson, David Alan Grier, Kelly Coffield Park, and T'Keyah Crystal Keymáh. The show introduced Jennifer Lopez and Carrie Ann Inaba as members of In Living Color's dance troupe The Fly Girls, with actress Rosie Perez serving as choreographer. The show was immensely popular in its first two seasons, capturing more than a 10-point Nielsen rating; in the third and fourth seasons, ratings faltered as the Wayans brothers fell out with the Fox network's leadership over creative control and rights.

The series won the Primetime Emmy Award for Outstanding Variety, Music or Comedy Series in 1990. The series gained international prominence for its bold move and its all-time high ratings gained by airing a live, special episode as a counterprogram for the halftime show of American leader CBS's live telecast of Super Bowl XXVI, prompting the National Football League to book A-list acts for future game entertainment, starting with Michael Jackson the following year. In 2018, a history of the show, Homey Don't Play That! by David Peisner, was released by 37 INK, an imprint of Simon & Schuster.

== Episodes ==
Season	Episodes	Originally released	
Season	Episodes	First released	Last released
1	13	April 15, 1990	September 9, 1990
2	26	September 23, 1990	September 1, 1991
3	30	September 22, 1991	May 17, 1992
4	32	September 27, 1992	May 23, 1993
5	26	September 16, 1993	May 19, 1994

== Cast ==
Cast member	Seasons				
Cast member	1	2	3	4	5
Keenen Ivory Wayans	Starring	Starring	Starring	Starring	
Jim Carrey	Starring	Starring	Starring	Starring	Starring
Kelly Coffield	Starring	Starring	Starring	Starring	
Kim Coles	Starring				
Tommy Davidson	Starring	Starring	Starring	Starring	Starring
David Alan Grier	Starring	Starring	Starring	Starring	Starring
T'Keyah Crystal Keymáh	Starring	Starring	Starring	Starring	Starring
Damon Wayans	Starring	Starring	Starring	Recurring	
Kim Wayans	Starring	Starring	Starring	Starring	
Jamie Foxx			Featured	Featured	Starring
Steve Park			Featured		
Shawn Wayans	Featured	Featured	Featured	Featured	
Marlon Wayans				Featured	
DJ Twist			Featured	Featured	Featured
Alexandra Wentworth				Featured	Starring
Anne-Marie Johnson					Starring
Jay Leggett					Starring
Reggie McFadden					Starring
Carol Rosenthal					Starring
Marc Wilmore					Starring

Fly Girl	Seasons				
Fly Girl	1	2	3	4	5
Deidre Lang	Dancer				
Rosie Perez (choreographer)	Dancer				
Cari French	Dancer				
Carrie Ann Inaba	Dancer				
Lisa Marie Todd	Dancer				
Michelle Whitney-Morrison	Dancer				
Carla Garrido		Dancer			
Jennifer Lopez			Dancer		
Jossie Harris				Dancer	
Lisa Joann Thompson				Dancer	
Laurieann Gibson					Dancer
Masako Willis					Dancer

== Production ==
=== Early history ===
Following Keenen Ivory Wayans' success with Hollywood Shuffle and I'm Gonna Git You Sucka, Fox approached Wayans to offer him his own show. Wayans wanted to produce a variety show similar to Saturday Night Live, but with a cast of people of color that took chances with its content. Wayans’ younger brother Damon had been with SNL during its 11th season, the first with Canadian creator Lorne Michaels returning after a five-year hiatus. However, Damon grew frustrated with his lack of creative freedom and screen time that he went rogue on one sketch, leading to his dismissal from the series. By contrast, Fox gave Keenen and his family a lot of freedom with In Living Color, although Fox executives were a bit concerned about the show's content prior to its television debut.

In announcing its debut, Fox described In Living Color as a "contemporary comedy variety show". In its preview, the Christian Science Monitor warned that its, "raw tone may offend some, but it does allow a talented troupe to experiment with black themes in a Saturday Night Live-ish format." Keenen Ivory Wayans said, "I wanted to do a show that reflects different points of view. We've added an Asian and a Hispanic minority to the show. We're trying in some way to represent all the voices. ... Minority talent is not in the system and you have to go outside. We found Crystal doing her act in the lobby of a theater in Chicago. We went beyond the Comedy Stores and Improvs, which are not showcase places for minorities."

The first episode aired on Sunday, April 15, 1990, following an episode of Married... with Children. The first episode was watched by 22.7 million people, making it the 29th-most-viewed show for the week.

The Miami Herald said the show was as "smart and saucy as it is self-aware" and "audacious and frequently tasteless, but terrific fun". The Philadelphia Inquirer called it "the fastest, funniest half-hour in a long time". The Seattle Times said it had "the free-wheeling, pointed sense of humor that connects with a large slice of today's audience". The Columbus Dispatch described it as a "marvelously inventive" show that has "catapulted television back to the cutting edge".

When asked about the show's use of stereotypes of Black culture for comedy, Wayans said, "Half of comedy is making fun of stereotypes. They only get critical when I do it. Woody Allen has been having fun with his culture for years, and no one says anything about it. Martin Scorsese, his films basically deal with the Italian community, and no one ever says anything to him. John Hughes, all of his films parody upscale White suburban life. Nobody says anything to him. When I do it, then all of a sudden it becomes a racial issue. You know what I mean? It's my culture, and I'm entitled to poke fun at the stereotypes that I didn't create in the first place. I don't even concern myself with that type of criticism, because it's racist in itself." Kim Coles, one of the original 9 cast members, was fired after the first season, later learning Wayans did not think she was versatile enough. The only cast members to appear in all 5 seasons were Keymáh, Grier, Davidson, and Carrey, although Carrey's appearances in the fifth season were limited due to his rapidly rising film career. Throughout 1993, Carrey was busy filming The Mask and Ace Ventura: Pet Detective (both 1994) all while still an active cast member on In Living Color.

=== Opening credits ===
For the first episode, an exotic-looking logo was used for the opening credits. However, after the band Living Colour claimed in a lawsuit that the show had stolen the band's logo and name, the logo was changed to one with rather plain-type letters of three colors. The show title itself is a homage to the NBC Peacock tag line, "The following program is brought to you in living color" from the 1960s when television was transitioning from black-and-white to color TV.

In the first two seasons, the opening sequence was set in a room covered with painters' tarps. Each cast member, wearing black-and-white, played with brightly colored paint in a different way (throwing paintballs at the camera by hand, spray painting the lens, using a roller to cover the camera lens, etc.). The sequence ended with a segue to a set built to resemble the rooftop of an apartment building, where the show's dancers performed a routine and opened a door to let Keenen Ivory Wayans greet a live audience.

For the third and fourth seasons, an animated sequence and different logo were used. Cast members were superimposed over pictures hanging in an art gallery and interacted with them in different ways (spinning the canvas to put it right-side up, swinging the frame out as if it were a door, etc.). The final image was of the logo on a black canvas, which shattered to begin the show. The fifth season retained the logo, but depicted the cast members on various signs and billboards around a city (either New York or Chicago), ending with the logo displayed on a theater marquee. The main title sequences were created by Klasky-Csupo, best known for Nickelodeon's Rugrats and produced by Robert Jason with some graphics by Beau Tardy.

The hip-hop group Heavy D & the Boyz performed two different versions of the opening theme. One version was used for the first two seasons and remixed for the fifth and last, while the other was featured in the third and fourth seasons.

=== The Fly Girls ===
The show employed an in-house dance troupe known as the "Fly Girls". The original lineup consisted of Carrie Ann Inaba (who became a choreographer and judge on Dancing with the Stars), Cari French, Deidre Lang, Lisa Marie Todd, Barbara Lumpkin and Michelle Whitney-Morrison. Rosie Perez was the choreographer for the first four seasons. The most notable former Fly Girl was future Latina actress/singer Jennifer Lopez, who joined the show in its third season.

Throughout the show's run, the Fly Girls frequently performed a dance routine to lead into commercial breaks and/or during the closing credits. In the first two seasons, they also performed a routine that immediately followed the opening sequence. Music was provided by an in-house DJ – Shawn Wayans (credited as SW-1) in the first two seasons, then DJ Twist from season 3 onward.

The Fly Girls would sometimes be used as extras in sketches, or as part of an opening gag. In one sketch, they were shown performing open-heart surgery (in the sketch, the girls are dancing in order to pay their way through medical school). Another routine featured the three original female cast members dancing off-beat during the introduction of the show, when it was revealed that the regular Fly Girls were all bound and gagged and breaking through the door where Keenan Ivory Wayans enters.

Three of the Fly Girls also appeared in the eleventh episode of Muppets Tonight's second season in 1997.

=== 1992 Super Bowl halftime show episode ===
During the 1992 Super Bowl, Fox opted to air an episode of In Living Color head-to-head with the Super Bowl halftime show on CBS. This gambit at Super Bowl counterprogramming proved successful in attracting and keeping Super Bowl halftime viewers and drew 20 million viewers for In Living Color. Moreover, it is credited with the NFL making the decision to adapt the modern-day usage of popular culture spectacles which has been used since Michael Jackson's performance at 1993 Super Bowl.

=== Wayans family departures ===
Keenen Ivory Wayans stopped appearing in sketches in 1992 after the end of the third season, over disputes with Fox about the network censoring the show's content and rerunning early episodes without his consultation; he feared that Fox would ultimately decrease the syndication value of In Living Color. During the fourth season, Keenen only appeared in the opening segment of the season premiere, though he remained in the opening credits up until the thirteenth episode due to his producer status, after which he departed the series altogether. Damon Wayans left at the end of the third season to pursue a film career, though he returned for several guest spots throughout the fourth season. Marlon Wayans, who had joined the fourth season as a featured player, left just two episodes after Keenen stepped down as producer. Shawn and Kim Wayans also wished to leave the series at the same time in solidarity with their family, but were unable to due to still being under contract at the time; both eventually left at the end of the season after their contracts' expirations.

== Broadcast and syndication ==
Originally produced by 20th Television on Fox, the series was in reruns on local affiliates for a few years, but has since become a longstanding mainstay on FX and FXX, which had been sister channels to Fox prior to being acquired by The Walt Disney Company.

In Canada, it was Simulcast on CBC Television during the entire run.

Reruns have also aired on MTV2, VH1, NuvoTV, Fusion TV, BET, and Centric, while the series previously aired on Aspire and TV One as of September 2020.

Unlike past runs on FX and the Viacom Media Networks, the FXX cut of episodes are mostly uncut and censored. The music video parodies and spoken references to licensed songs have been reinstated, but the "Bolt 45" sketch, the "drop the soap" line, and the "Men on Football" sketch with the adlibbed lines about Richard Gere's and Carl Lewis's alleged homosexuality are still edited (though the facial ejaculation shot on "Men on Fitness" was reinstated), along with a line from the season five sketch "Fire Marshall Bill at the Magic Show" that makes reference to the 1993 World Trade Center bombing (the missing line is, "That's what they said about the World Trade Center, son. But me and my friend Abdul and a couple of pounds of plastique explosives showed them different." Bill's laugh and his catchphrase "Lemme show ya somethin'" was also cut abruptly), due to the September 11, 2001 attacks.

The Best of In Living Color aired on MyNetworkTV from April 16 to June 18, 2008. Hosted by David Alan Grier, it was a retrospective featuring classic sketches, along with cast interviews and behind-the-scenes footage. The show aired on Wednesdays at 8:30 pm Eastern/7:30 pm Central, after MyNetworkTV's sitcom Under One Roof.

Episodes of the show were added to the streaming platform The Brick TV in 2026.

== Home media ==
20th Century Fox Home Entertainment has released all five seasons of In Living Color on DVD in Region 1. Due to music licensing issues, some sketches have been edited to remove any and all mention of licensed songs, from characters waxing lyrical to entire performances (including the music video parodies and some of the Fly Girl dancing interstitials). Additionally, the "Bolt 45" sketch (which aired once on May 5, 1990) was omitted, and the "soap" portion of the "drop the soap" line in the second "Men on Film" sketch has been muted.

DVD name	Ep #	Release date
Season 1	13	April 6, 2004
Season 2	26	September 28, 2004
Season 3	28	May 10, 2005
Season 4	33	October 25, 2005
Season 5	26	April 11, 2006

== Reception ==
=== Ratings ===
- 1990–91: #62 (10.5 rating)
- 1991–92: #42 (12.2 rating)
- 1992–93: #53 (10.4 rating)
- 1993–94: #90 (7.6 rating)

=== Awards ===
- Image Awards 1994 for Outstanding Variety Series
- Image Awards 1992 for Outstanding Comedy Series
- PGA Awards 1992 for Most Promising Producer in Television: Keenen Ivory Wayans
- People's Choice Award 1991 for Favorite New TV Comedy Series Tied with The Simpsons (1989)
- TV Land Awards 2012 for Groundbreaking Show: Shared with whole cast
- Primetime Emmy Award 1990 for Outstanding Variety, Music or Comedy Series

== Crossovers ==
- At the 2006 BET Awards when the show returned from one of its commercial breaks, the show's host Damon Wayans played a character very reminiscent to "Men on ..." critic Blaine Edwards
- In Living Color alums Damon Wayans, Jim Carrey, and David Alan Grier reprised some of their In Living Color characters on Saturday Night Live:
  - Damon Wayans, a featured player during that show's eleventh season, hosted an episode from SNL's 20th season in 1995, where he brought on two of his famous In Living Color characters: homeless wino Anton Jackson and gay film critic Blaine Edwards. In the Anton sketch it revealed both the main character's full name (Anton Frederic Jackson) and the place where he is living (in an airport trashcan), and in the Edwards latter sketch, David Alan Grier made a surprise on-set appearance as Antoine Merriweather; Grier himself would also host SNL on December 9, 1995 (season 21) and January 18, 1997 (season 22), but did not reprise any of his In Living Color characters during those respective episodes.
  - Jim Carrey auditioned to be one of the repertory members on SNL's ill-fated 1980–1981 season, but was dropped in favor of Charles Rocket (who later appeared in the 1988 film Earth Girls Are Easy and the 1994 film Dumb and Dumber with Carrey). Carrey also auditioned for the 1985–1986 season (season 11), but backed out after seeing a man threatening to jump from 30 Rockefeller Center, believing that the stress of working on Saturday Night Live would drive Carrey to suicide. Carrey hosted the season finale of SNL's 21st season in 1996, where he impersonated Fire Marshal Bill during the monologue. Carrey's most recent hosting stint, in October 2014, involved a Carrey family reunion sketch in which Cecily Strong plays Carrey's aunt, who is modeled after Fire Marshal Bill.
- Jamie Foxx reprised his role as Wanda in a short segment at the 2009 BET Awards.
- In 1997, three of the Fly Girls also appeared in the eleventh episode of Muppets Tonight's second season.
- In the 1997 film Liar Liar, Jim Carrey reprised his "Fire Marshall Bill" character (albeit with no lines) in the background of one of the closing scenes.
- The February 10, 2001 episode of Saturday Night Live hosted by Jennifer Lopez included a sketch where Lopez "reunited" with the Fly Girls (played by Rachel Dratch, Jerry Minor and Tracy Morgan).

== Attempted revival ==
The In Living Color 2012 logo.

In 2011, there were plans to make a revival of the original series that featured a new cast, characters, and sketches. The pilot episodes were hosted and executive produced by original series creator and cast member Keenen Ivory Wayans. In early 2012, Tabitha and Napoleon D'umo were hired as the choreographers. They cast the new line-up of The Fly Girls and shot pilot episodes for the show which were set to air on Fox, like the original. However, on January 8, 2013, Keenen Ivory Wayans confirmed the reboot had been canceled because he and Fox did not feel that the show was sustainable after one season. Reported cast members included Cooper Barnes, Jennifer Bartels, Sydney Castillo, Josh Duvendeck, Jermaine Fowler, Ayana Hampton, Kali Hawk, and Lil Rel Howery. In addition, featured cast members were Henry Cho, Melanie Minichino, and Chris Leidecker. Members of the new Fly Girls included Christina Chandler, Tera Perez, Lisa Rosenthal, Katee Shean, and Whitney Wiley.

Many of the cast members of the revival (Bartels, Fowler, and Howery) went on to create the TruTV sketch show Friends of the People.

== Legacy ==
Pop singer Bruno Mars paid tribute to the television program in the music video for his 2018 single "Finesse".

== See also ==
- Saturday Night Live
- Mad TV
- All That
