= Lisa Joann Thompson =

American actress (born 1969)

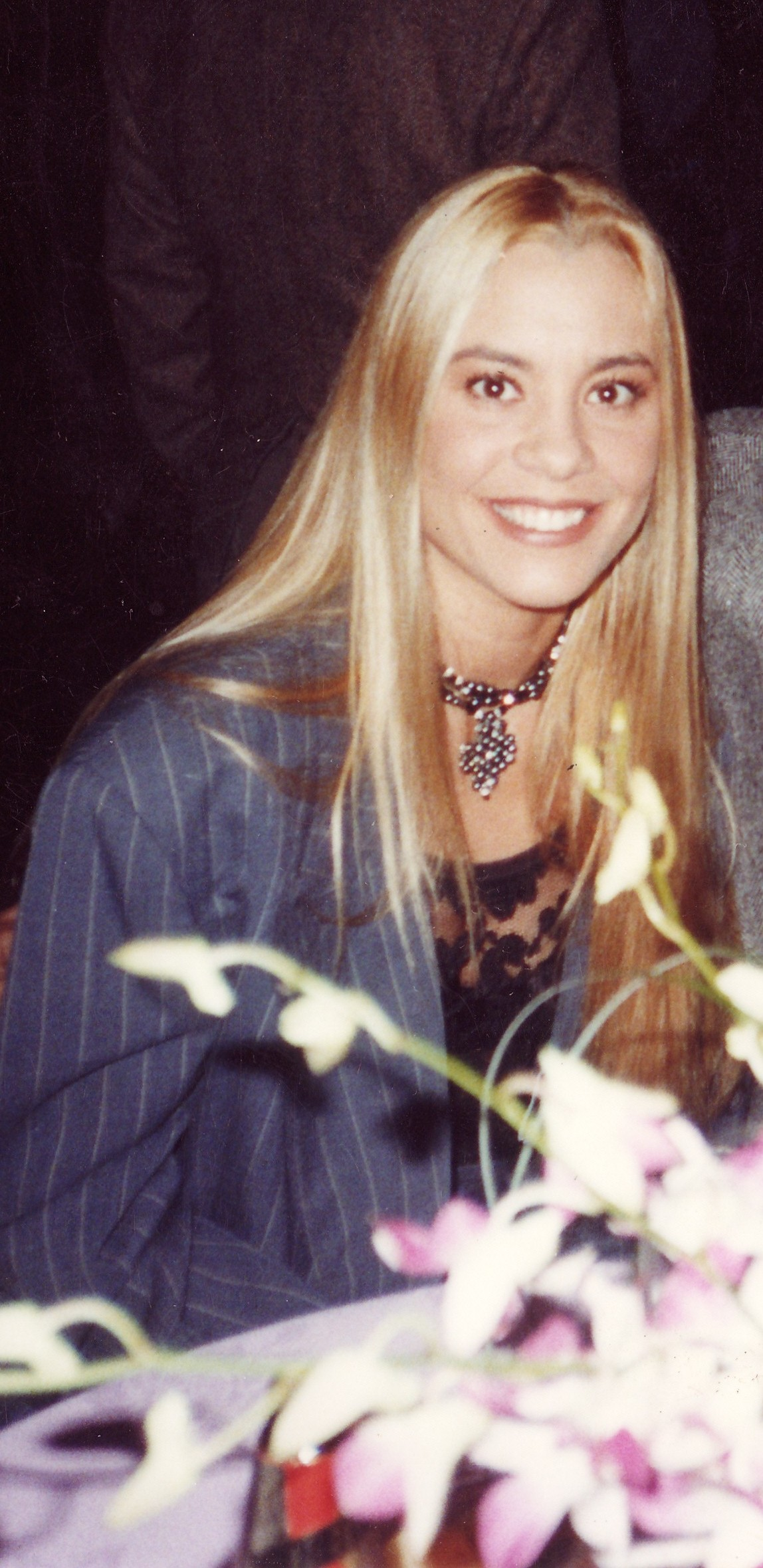
- Thompson attending a movie release party at Iwerks Entertainment in Burbank, California, 1994
- Born: April 22, 1969 (age 57); Oak Forest, Illinois, U.S.
- Occupations: Dancer, Model, Actress, Choreographer
- Years active: 1988–present

Lisa Joann Thompson (born April 22, 1969) is an American dancer, choreographer, actress, and model involved in multiple areas of show business. She was a Warrior Girl, Laker Girl, Fly Girl, Motown Live Dancer, and Backup dancer to some of the most prominent artists in the music industry. She starred in the hit television show In Living Color as a Fly Girl during seasons 4 and 5, and was assistant choreographer during season 5.

In television, Thompson had recurring dancer roles in the series In Living Color, Fame L.A., Motown Live, Tracey Takes On..., and Cedric the Entertainer Presents; she had supporting acting roles in the series The Bold and the Beautiful, Days of Our Lives, The X-Files, The Pretender and MTV's Now What. She also made guest appearances in syndicated television shows such as The Muppets and Herman's Head, and daytime talk shows such as The Rosie O'Donnell Show and Leeza.

In film, Thompson appeared as a dancer in Michael Jackson's Ghosts (1997) and Austin Powers: International Man of Mystery (1997), and she had dancer roles in scenes from a variety of hit films in the 2000s such as The Majestic (2001), The Hot Chick (2002), Charlie's Angels: Full Throttle (2003), Starsky & Hutch and Shark Tale (2004), and Big Momma's House 2 (2006).

In television commercials, Thompson has appeared in a variety of local and national spots, including a major advertising campaign for Jack in the Box, and a national for The Gap, Inc. clothing retailer called "Khaki a Go Go," that made the TV Guide list of "50 Greatest TV Commercials of All Time."

In music as a Backup dancer and choreographer, between appearances in television and film, Thompson has provided choreography and/or dance steps, made appearances in music videos, or danced in awards shows with many top musical acts at the apex of their fame including Michael Jackson, Madonna, NSYNC, Backstreet Boys, Vitamin C, Deborah Cox, Bubba Sparxxx, Ricky Martin, and Will Smith.

Thompson has been a regular Host and emcee for The Carnival: Choreographer’s Ball show for five years.

She has been featured in articles and interviews by various publications such as Rolling Stone Magazine, Shape Magazine, and TV Guide, and newspapers such as the USA Today, Los Angeles Times, and Oakland Tribune.

== NBA cheerleader ==
During the 1988–89 NBA season and the 1989–90 NBA season, Thompson was a member of the Warrior Girls for the Golden State Warriors National Basketball Association (NBA) team. While a member of the Warrior Girls, Thompson appeared in the MC Hammer videos U Can't Touch This and Pray. After her second stint as a Warrior Girl and feeling inspired from appearing in the popular MC Hammer videos, Thompson moved to Los Angeles to pursue a career in dance and acting.

During the 1990–91 NBA season, Thompson was a member of the Laker Girls for the Los Angeles Lakers NBA team. That season the Los Angeles Lakers went to the NBA Finals against the Chicago Bulls NBA team.

Thompson was selected as a Laker Girl for the 1992–93 NBA season, but declined, opting instead to work in television.

== Fly Girls ==
From 1992 to 1994, Thompson starred in the Fox sketch comedy television series In Living Color as a Fly Girl during seasons 4 and 5. She also appeared as herself or as a dancer in various comedy sketches with cast members or guest stars.

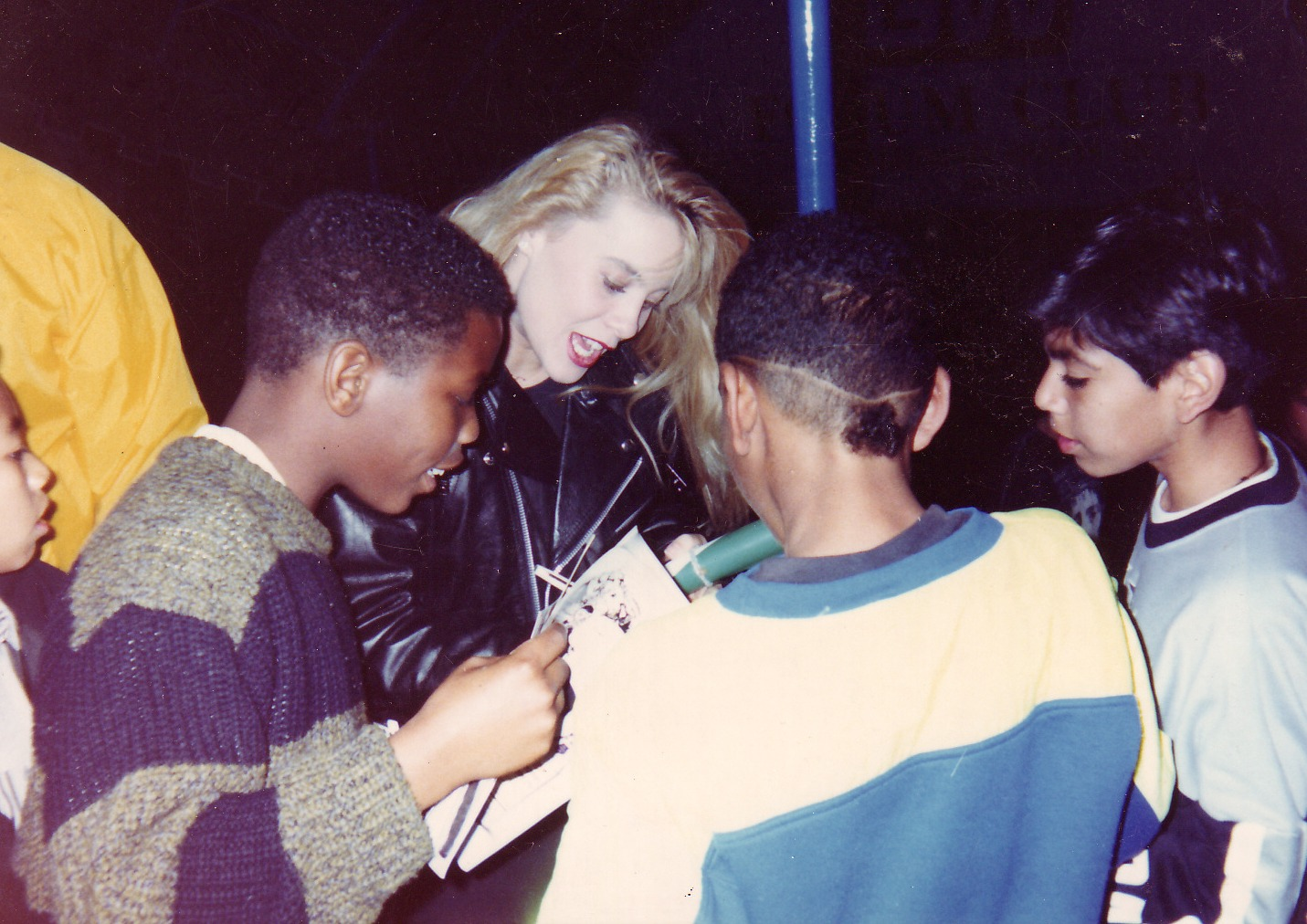
Lisa Joann Thompson, early 1990s

On September 23, 1993, Thompson was the lead guest star on Herman's Head, an American television sitcom, season 3, episode 2, "There's a Fly Girl in my Soup." This episode was featured in the September 18–24 Fall Pre-View special issue of TV Guide Magazine.

The Fly Girls did a number of guest appearances on talk shows such as The Rosie O'Donnell Show, Vicki! hosted by Vicki Lawrence, Leeza hosted by Leeza Gibbons, and an appearance on The Muppets.

Thompson was also an Assistant Choreographer for In Living Color, Season 5.

After In Living Color was cancelled, Thompson was slated to be the host of the television game show, MTV's Singled Out. However, she was replaced by Jenny McCarthy between the test shows and the first episode. Thompson then switched from television to modeling.

== Modeling ==
From 1995 to 1996, Thompson was represented by the Bobby Ball Agency (BBA) in Hollywood and traveled around the world dancing and modeling for sports companies Nike, Reebok, and Skechers.

== Film, television, and dancing ==
In 1997, Thompson was a dancer in the short film Michael Jackson Ghosts, co-written by Stephen King and directed by Stan Winston. Thompson was one of the primary performers in the Maestro's (Michael Jackson) family of dancing ghouls. Shooting took place for several months in an unused hangar at the Van Nuys Airport in Van Nuys, California. The film was screened at the 1997 Cannes Film Festival and released to the general public on May 9, 1997.

From 1997 to 1999, Thompson had dancer roles in Fame L.A., a television series about a dance school in Los Angeles. While on Fame L.A., she also was a Motown Live Dancer on the TV series Motown Live, appeared as a supporting actress in the American television series The Pretender, and appeared as dancer in the American movie Austin Powers: International Man of Mystery.

In October 1997, Thompson was a member of the fictional musical group called the Spicy Crispy Girls, a take off of the Spice Girls, a British pop music girl group (at the time one of the most popular groups in the world), in comedic national television commercials for the Jack in the Box fast-food chain restaurant. The commercials were used to promote the new Jack in the Box Spicy Crispy Sandwich, with the girls dancing in "the Jack groove." The Spicy Crispy Girls concept was used as a model for another successful advertising campaign called the 'Meaty Cheesy Boys.' At the 1998 Association of Independent Commercial Producers (AICP) Show, one of the Spicy Crispy Girls commercials won the top award for humor.

On December 6, 1998, Thompson was a supporting actress on The X-Files episode "Dreamland II".

In early 1999, Thompson appeared in a national television commercial for The Gap, Inc. clothing retailer called Khaki A Go Go, which was a brilliant advertisement known for its simple yet effective message - showing a group of young dancers having fun dancing in The Gap Khakis to 60's swing. The commercial won Best Commercial award at the American Choreography Awards in 1999." The July 3, 1999 issue of TV Guide Magazine (Vol. 47, Num. 27) rated the commercial as one of the "50 Greatest TV Commercials of All Time," and featured a story on three of the dancers, including Thompson. Thompson, who had changed her hair from blond to 'fire-red' as noted by TV Guide, was a standout in the commercial, with several full-page photos of her in the guide.

== Later work ==
=== The 2000s ===
Throughout the 2000s, Thompson had dancer roles in a variety of television programs and hit films by major film studios, and worked as a choreographer in television, movies, and in numerous music videos with many of the top recording artists in the music industry.

She has been a backup dancer in most of the major awards shows in the entertainment business including the Academy Awards Show, The Grammys, MTV Music Awards, MTV Movie Awards, American Music Awards, BET Awards, and The Emmys.

In 2000–2001, Thompson was a character on the television situation comedy MTV's Now What, which followed the lives of four friends in their junior year in High School.

In 2002–2003, Thompson had recurring roles on the Fox sketch comedy television series Cedric the Entertainer Presents.

In 2004, Thompson was used for "performance capture" for dance scenes in the Oscar nominated animated feature, Shark Tale. During performance capture (i.e., motion capture), the performer wears a suit affixed with reflective markers that record the human actions; this data is used to animate digital character models in computer animation. The animated characters perform the same actions as the human actor. Thompson did performance capture in dance scenes for animated characters portrayed by Angelina Jolie and Renée Zellweger. Shark Tale grossed $367 million worldwide and was nominated for Best Animated Feature at the 77th Academy Awards show.

Thompson is a longtime collaborator and/or assistant choreographer with producer/choreographer Tony Gonzalez (Tony G). She was assistant to Tony G for the Bring it On cheerleader comedy films (2004's Bring It On Again, 2006's Bring It On: All or Nothing, 2007's Bring It On: In It to Win It and 2009's Bring It On: Fight to the Finish).

In 2011, Thompson collaborated with producer/choreographer Tony G on several webisodes of the NBC situation comedy television show The Office, Season 7.

=== The Carnival: Choreographer’s Ball ===
Thompson has been a regular Host and emcee for The Carnival: Choreographer’s Ball show for five years. The show is a monthly showcase of the top choreographers in the world (video, music, and film), usually run in Hollywood, New York City, London, Tokyo and Paris; and is considered the dance community's ultimate competitive venue for choreographers to display their work.

The show often includes special guests and appearances by many of the top dancers and choreographers including Paula Abdul, Travis Payne, Kenny Ortega, and Wade Robson. The audience is usually populated with many of the top songwriters and musical acts in the entertainment business.

=== Theater and voice-overs ===
In the mid-2000s, Thompson began focusing more on comedy. She attended The Second City and The Groundlings improvisational comedy enterprises. Afterward she began doing sketch comedy and stand up in various theaters and comedy clubs in the Los Angeles area.

In 2006, Thompson began performing as a warm up comic for television and theater productions such as the Fox television sitcom Happy Hour.

Thompson does voice-overs through voice casting agent Kalmenson & Kalmenson.

== See also ==
- List of dancers
