= Motown Live =

- Genre: Variety show
- Created by: Robert Townsend
- Written by: Rita Cash
- Directed by: Terri McCoy
- Starring: Robert Townsend, Montell Jordan, Kevin Alexander Stea
- Country of origin: United States
- Original language: English
- No. of seasons: 1
- No. of episodes: 13

Production
- Executive producer: Tzvi Small
- Producer: Michael Levitt
- Running time: 60 minutes
- Production companies: Ken Ehrlich Productions; Elephant Walk Entertainment

Original release
- Network: First run syndication
- Release: September 28, 1998 – September 1, 1999

Motown Live is an American television series featuring live performances by music artists in rhythm and blues, hip hop, and popular music. The show aired 13 episodes from 1998 to 1999.

The show was hosted by Robert Townsend and Montell Jordan. Its format featured several Motown Live Dancers opening and closing the show, along with backup artists. The program also included comedy sketches between artist appearances.

Ricky Minor, the current music director for American Idol, served as the music and house band director.

The Motown Live Dancers included Lisa Joann Thompson, Faune Chambers, Carmit Bachar, and Kevin Stea.

The show was in syndication until 2000 and was distributed by Universal Worldwide Television.

== Cast ==
- Donielle Artese, Motown Live Dancer
- Carmit Bachar, Motown Live Dancer
- Joe Blount
- Faune Chambers, Motown Live Dancer
- Montell Jordan
- Kevin Stea, Motown Live Dancer
- Lisa Joann Thompson, Motown Live Dancer
- Robert Townsend
