= Withington (disambiguation) =

Withington is a suburban area of Manchester, England

Withington may also refer to:

== People with the surname ==
- Alfreda Bosworth Withington (1860–1951), American physician and author
- Dick Withington (1921–1981), English footballer
- Eliza Withington (1825–1877), American photographer
- Harry Withington (1868–1947), English footballer
- John Withington (1865–1944), Australian politician
- Leonard Withington (1789–1885), American minister and author
- Lothrop Withington (1856–1915), American genealogist, historian, and book editor
- Paul Withington (1888–1966), American football player
- Shane Withington (b. 1958), Australian actor
- William H. Withington (1835–1903), American Union Army general

== Places ==
=== England ===
- Withington (ward), an electoral ward of Manchester
- Withington, Gloucestershire, a village and parish near Cheltenham
- Withington, Herefordshire, a village and parish near Hereford
- Withington, Staffordshire, a parish
- Withington, Shropshire, a village and parish near Shrewsbury
- Lower Withington, Cheshire, a village and parish containing Jodrell Bank

=== United States ===
- Withington Estate, listed on the NRHP in Middlesex County, New Jersey
- Withington Wilderness, New Mexico

== Transportation ==
- Withington railway station (Gloucestershire), former station in Withington, Gloucestershire, England
- Withington railway station (Herefordshire), former station in Withington, Herefordshire, England
- Withington tram stop, Greater Manchester
- Withington and West Didsbury railway station, former station in Greater Manchester
