= Anne Withington =

American activist

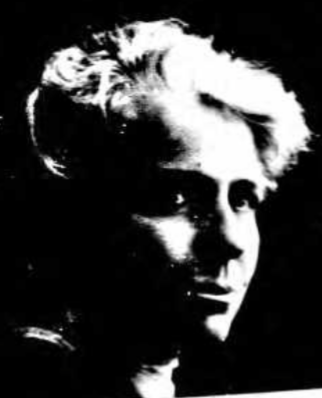
- Anne Withington, from her 1915 passport application
- Born: January 17, 1867; Newbury, Massachusetts
- Died: January 12, 1933 (aged 65); Newburyport, Massachusetts
- Occupations: Pacifist, suffragist, trade unionist
- Relatives: Leonard Withington (grandfather); Lothrop Withington (brother); Paul Withington (nephew)

Anne Toppan Withington (January 17, 1867 – January 12, 1933) was an American activist in the causes of peace, women's suffrage, and organized labor. She served on the executive board of the Massachusetts Political Equality Union, and was a member of the American delegations to the International Congress of Women meetings in The Hague in 1915, and in Zürich in 1919.

== Early life and education ==
Withington was born in Newbury, Massachusetts, the daughter of Nathan Noyes Withington and Elizabeth Little Withington. Her father, a newspaper editor, teacher, and local historian, served in the Massachusetts House of Representatives. Her paternal grandfather was clergyman Leonard Withington. Her older brother Lothrop Withington was an editor and historian who died in the sinking of the RMS Lusitania. Her nephew Paul Withington was a medical doctor and college football coach.

== Career ==
Withington worked at Jane Addams' Hull House settlement in Chicago as a young woman. She established and maintained experimental school gardens at several schools in Boston, and lectured on the "moral and economic benefit" of home gardens in Boston in 1907. In 1908, she supported William Jennings Bryan's campaign for president, saying "I think the intelligent suffragists have decided personal opinions on political matters and, therefore, it would be disastrous to the woman suffrage movement for them to commit themselves to either party."

In 1909, Withington contributed to a Boston Globe feature on "Why Women Wage Earners Should Organize", alongside Emily Greene Balch, Margaret L. Foley, John Golden, John F. Tobin, and Henry Sterling; she wrote, "Women have always done more than their share of the work of the world, and now, for the first time, they are beginning to realize its value." In 1911, as secretary of the School Voters' League, she organized the political campaign of Susan Walker Fitzgerald, when she ran for the Boston school board. She served on the executive board of the Massachusetts Political Equality Union. She represented the Women's Trade Union League of Boston and the Political Equality League of Boston in the American delegations to the International Congress of Women meetings in The Hague in 1915, and in Zürich in 1919.

In 1927, she was a delegate to the First Pan Pacific Conference on Education, Rehabilitation, Reclamation and Recreation, held in Honolulu, where her older brother lived.

== Publications ==
- The history of trade unionism among women in Boston (1906, pamphlet for the Women's Trade Union League of Massachusetts)
- "Uses of School Gardens" (1907)
- Men, the Workers (1909, collected essays by Henry Demarest Lloyd, edited by Withington and Caroline Stallbohm)
- "Two Fundamental Reasons" (1909)
- "The Lawrence Strike" (1912)
- "When the Telephone Girls Organized" (1913)
- "The Telephone Strike" (1919)

== Personal life ==
Withington died in 1933, just before her 66th birthday, in Newburyport, Massachusetts.
