= Royal Hawaiian Hotel =

Hotel in Honolulu, Hawaii

The Royal Hawaiian
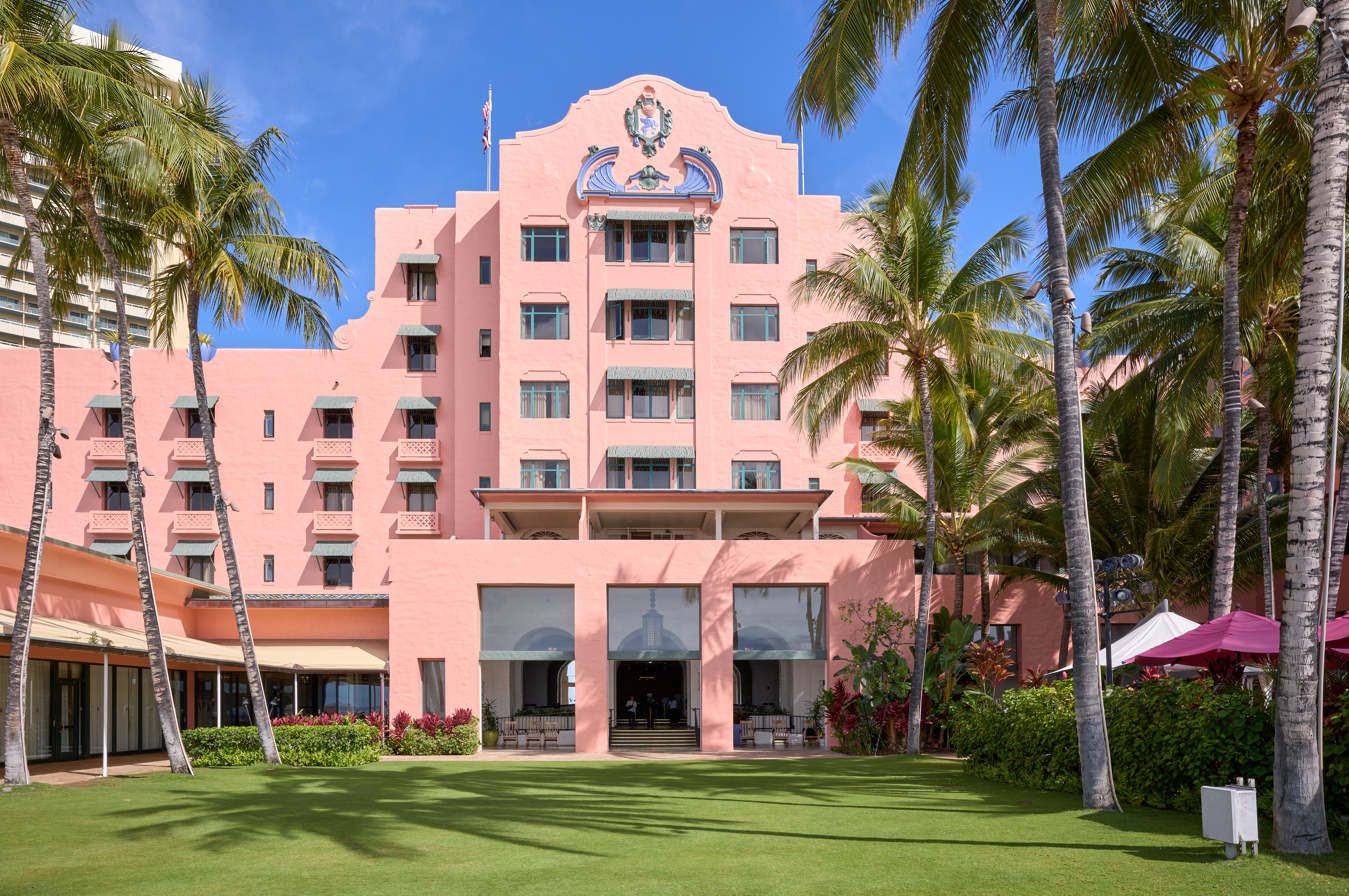
- The Royal Hawaiian as seen from Waikiki Beach, 2024

General information
- Location: 2259 Kalākaua Avenue; Waikiki, Honolulu, Hawai'i
- Coordinates: 21°16′39″N 157°49′44″W
- Opening: 1927
- Owner: Kyo-ya Company Limited
- Landlord: Kamehameha Schools

Technical details
- Floor count: 6; 17
- Floor area: 12,000 square feet (1,100 m^{2})

Design and construction
- Architect: Warren and Wetmore

Other information
- Number of rooms: 528
- Number of suites: 34
- Number of restaurants: 3
- Parking: Valet; Self parking at adjacent Sheraton

Website
- www.royal-hawaiian.com

The Royal Hawaiian Hotel is a beachfront luxury hotel in Waikiki, Honolulu, Hawaii, on the island of Oahu. It is part of The Luxury Collection brand of Marriott International. One of the first hotels established in Waikiki, the Royal Hawaiian is considered one of the most luxurious and famous hotels in Hawaiian tourism and has hosted numerous celebrities and world dignitaries. The bright pink hue of its concrete stucco façade with its Spanish/Moorish styled architecture and prominent location on the wide sandy beach have earned it the alliterative nickname "The Pink Palace of the Pacific".

== History ==
With the success of the early efforts by Matson Navigation Company to provide steamer travel to America's wealthiest families en route to Hawaii, a series of resort hotels were built in Honolulu at the start of the 20th century, including the Moana Hotel (1901) and Honolulu Seaside Hotel, both on Waikiki Beach, and the Alexander Young Hotel in downtown Honolulu (1903). By the 1920s, they were all owned by the Territorial Hotel Company.

In 1925, with tourism to Hawaii growing rapidly, the Matson Line partnered with Castle & Cooke, one of the Big Five companies in territorial Hawaii. They formulated a "grand scheme" to make the islands a luxury destination. They would construct the fastest, safest, most expensive ocean liner ever built for the Hawaiian service (the SS Malolo); a luxury beach resort hotel to serve the liner's passengers; and an exclusive golf club for the hotel's guests (the Waialae Country Club).

Because Matson and Castle & Cooke had never operated hotels, they bought the Territorial Hotel Company, to run the new hotel, and then demolished the company's Honololu Seaside Hotel. On its site, they contracted the acclaimed New York firm of Warren and Wetmore to design the Royal Hawaiian Hotel. The sprawling pink stucco concrete façade Spanish/Moorish styled complex, built at a cost of over $4 million (1927 prices), was surrounded by a 15-acre (6.1 ha) landscaped garden. The H-shaped layout featured 400 rooms, each with bath and balcony.

The Royal Hawaiian opened on February 1, 1927, with a black tie gala attended by over 1,200 guests, and quickly became an icon of Hawaii's glory days. The First Pan Pacific Conference on Education, Rehabilitation, Reclamation and Recreation convened in April with its headquarters at the Royal Hawaiian Hotel; it was the first time that Hawaii held a conference of this size.

The hotel was a huge success, and in 1928 the islands counted over 20,000 visitors for the first time. The Great Depression struck in 1929, cratering tourism. In 1933, the Territorial Hotel Company was dissolved, with Matson assuming control of their hotels through its Hawaii Properties Ltd. division, and Castle & Cooke writing off their investment. In 1941, Hawaii Properties Ltd. was dissolved and Matson assumed direct control of the hotel.

During World War II, the Royal Hawaiian was used exclusively by the U.S. military as an R&R center. Barriers of concertina wire blockaded access from the adjacent beaches.

The hotel recouped much of its clientele after 1945. It was sold, along with the rest of Matson's hotels in Hawaii, to Sheraton Hotels in 1959.

During the 1960s, the "Pink Palace" was home to "Concert by the Sea", which broadcast daily through the Armed Forces Radio Network (AFN).

In September 1974, Japanese businessmen-brothers Kenji Osano and Masakuni Osano purchased the Royal Hawaiian Hotel from ITT Sheraton. They formed Kyo-ya Company Ltd, a subsidiary of Kokusai Kogyo Company Ltd as the corporate entity to manage all their hotels.

After the Osano brothers' deaths, Takamasa Osano inherited their properties.

The ground upon which the hotel is built is owned by Kamehameha Schools, which leases the land.

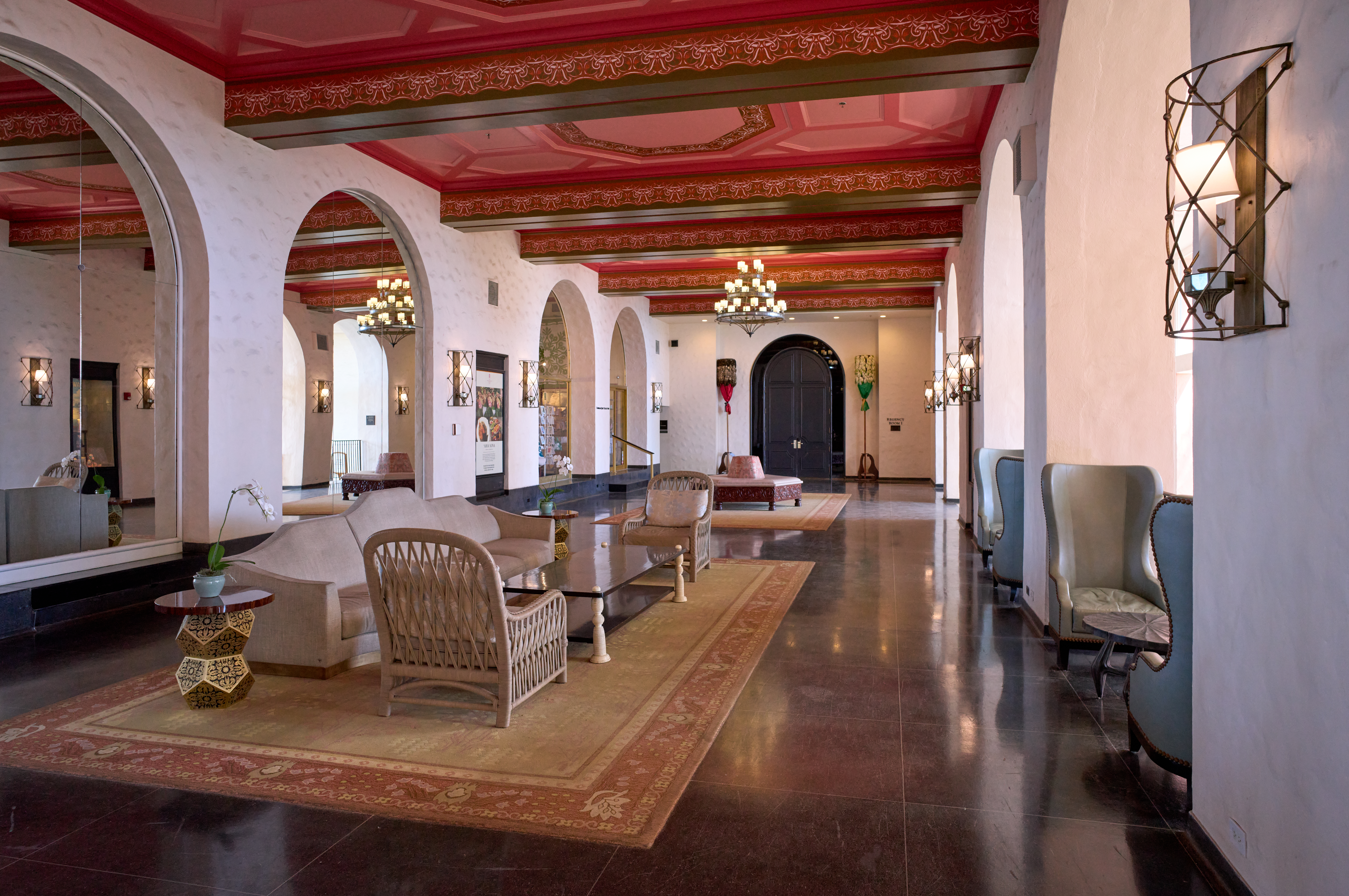
Interior of the hotel in 2024

The Royal Hawaiian closed on June 1, 2008, for renovation. It reopened on January 20, 2009, as a member of The Luxury Collection. An extended renovation of the Royal Beach Tower was completed in 2010.

The Royal Hawaiian Hotel is a member of Historic Hotels of America, the official program of the National Trust for Historic Preservation.

== Architecture ==
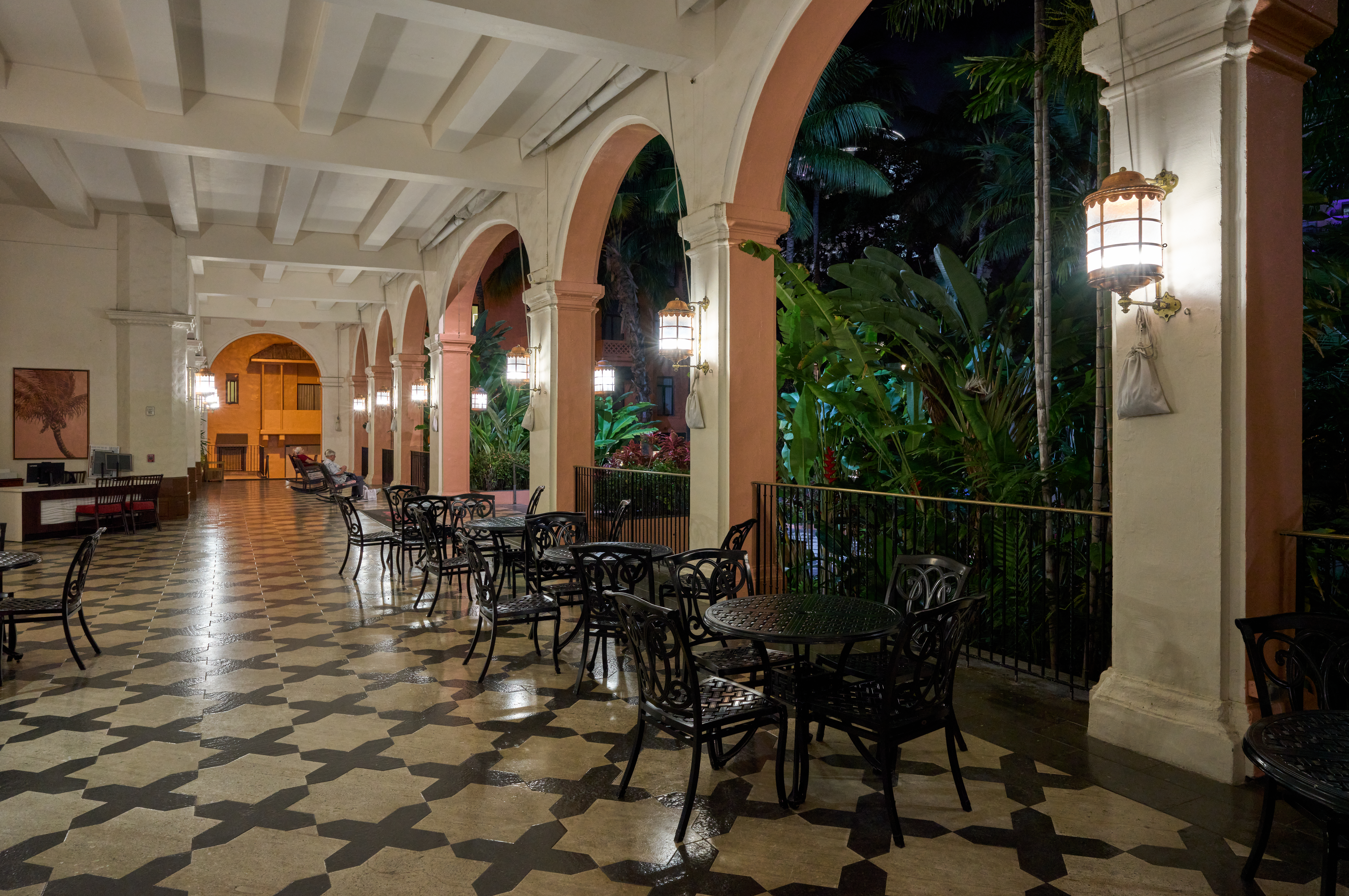
The courtyard patio of the hotel at night, 2024

The six-story structure has 400 rooms. It was designed in the Spanish and Moorish styles with stucco façades. Its design was influenced by Hollywood film star and legend Rudolph Valentino and his Arabian movies. Cupolas were created to resemble Spanish Mission style bell towers. The architects were Warren and Wetmore of New York City.

The hotel's public rooms were redecorated in 1946 by Frances Elkins, the sister of architect David Adler.

== In popular culture ==
The hotel has featured in numerous media projects.

=== In film ===
- The hotel was used in the 1931 Charlie Chan film The Black Camel.
- The hotel lobby was used in the 1952 film Big Jim McLain.
- The hotel appeared in the 1952 Tom and Jerry animated/cartoon theatrical short Cruise Cat.
- The hotel was mentioned in the 1953 film "From Here to Eternity" by Burt Lancaster's character, Sgt. Warden. The film took place in 1941, so the reference to the Royal Hawaiian Hotel was in the context of 1941, not 1953, when the film was made.
- The hotel was used in the 1962 movie Gidget Goes Hawaiian.
- The hotel was used in the 1978 film Goin' Coconuts
- The hotel was in the background in the 1984 film Once Upon a Time in America.
- The hotel appeared in the 2002 film Punch-Drunk Love.
- The hotel appeared in the 2008 film Flirting with Forty.
- The hotel appeared in the 2014 film Big Eyes
- The hotel appeared in the 2022 Hallmark Channel film Two Tickets to Paradise starring Ryan Paevey and Ashley Williams.

=== In television ===
- The hotel was mentioned in the 1954 I Love Lucy episode "Ricky's Hawaiian Vacation."
- The hotel's exterior appeared in the 1968–1980 procedural drama Hawaii Five-O.
- The hotel appeared in the 1977 Charlie's Angels episode "Angels in Paradise".
- The hotel appeared in the 1979 Eight Is Enough episode "Fathers and Other Strangers" Parts 1 and 2.
- The hotel appeared in the 1981 Hart To Hart episode "Murder In Paradise".
- The hotel appeared in two episodes of the series Murder, She Wrote.
- The hotel appeared in the 2002 episode "The Kyles Go To Hawaii" of My Wife and Kids.
- The hotel appeared in the 2013 Mad Men season 6 premiere, "The Doorway".

=== In music ===
- The hotel is referenced in Joni Mitchell's 1970 song Big Yellow Taxi (as the "pink hotel").

=== In video games ===
- The hotel features in the Hawaii level in Tony Hawk's Underground, released in 2003 for the PS2, Xbox, and GameCube. It has a notable role in the game's story mode as in one mission the player must land on the hotel's awning after jumping off an adjacent building and over a police helicopter while performing a McTwist as part of a filmed stunt.

=== In books and novels ===
- The hotel is featured in the 1953 A. A. Fair novel "Some Women Won't Wait" (Cool and Lam series)

== Gallery ==
The Royal Hawaiian

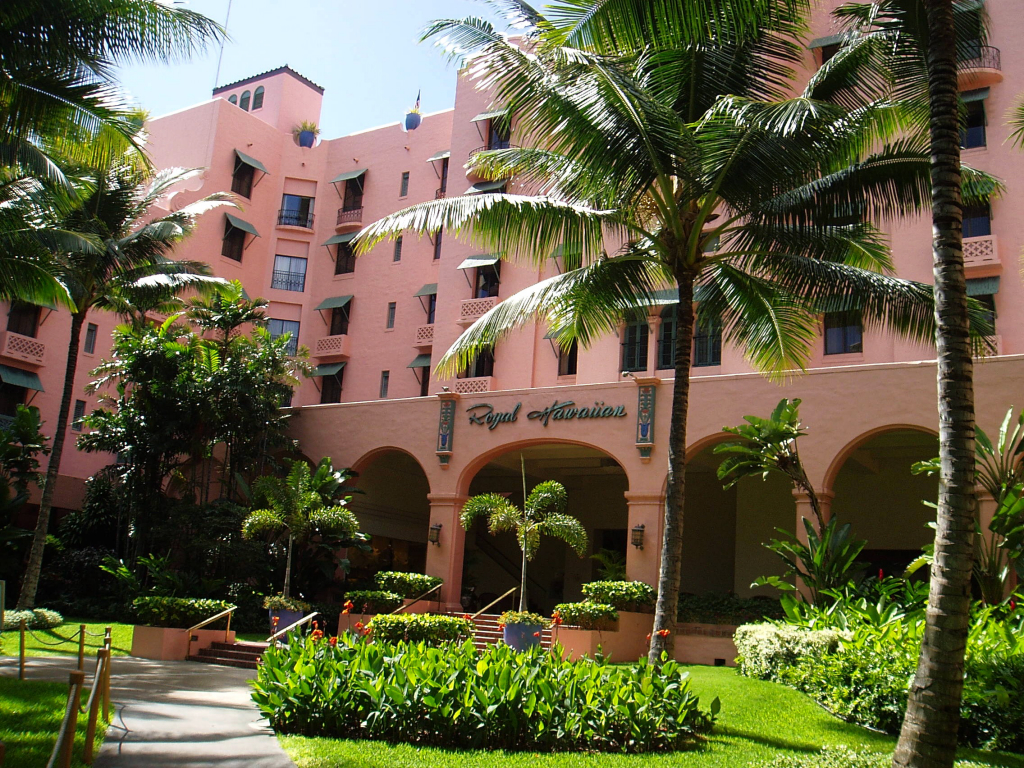
The Royal Hawaiian

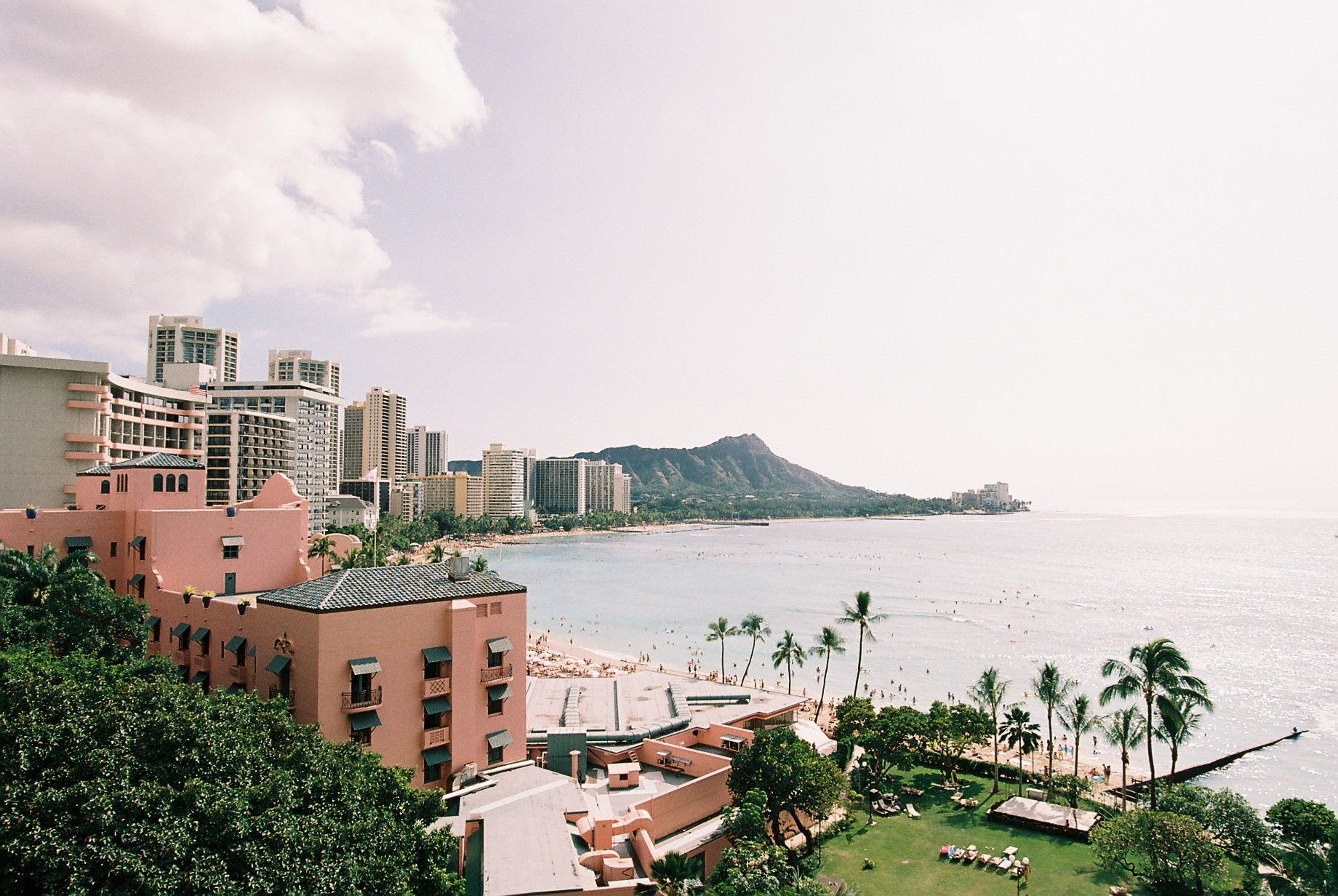
The Royal Hawaiian and Diamond Head, seen from the Sheraton Waikiki

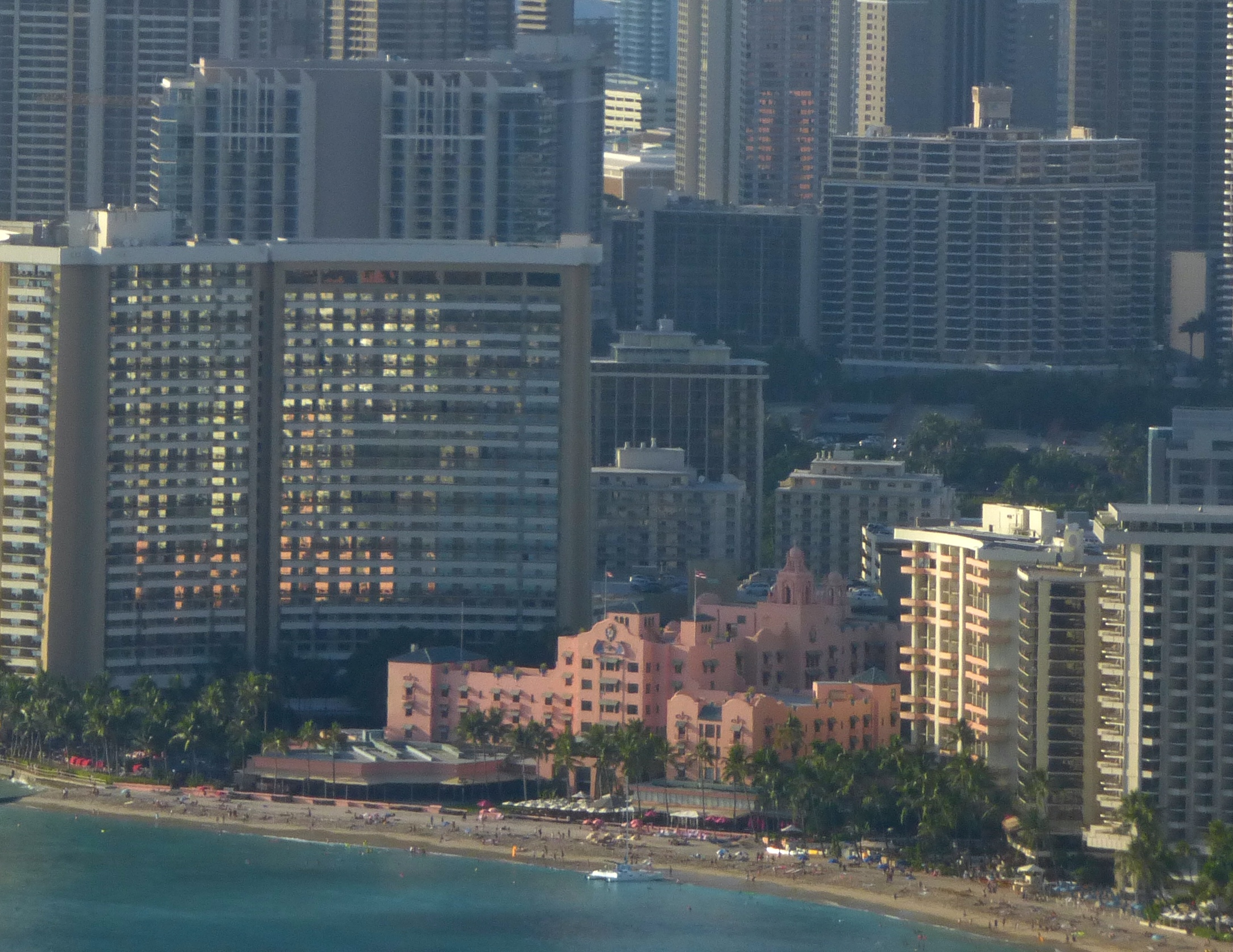
The Royal Hawaiian, with the modern Sheraton Waikiki behind it

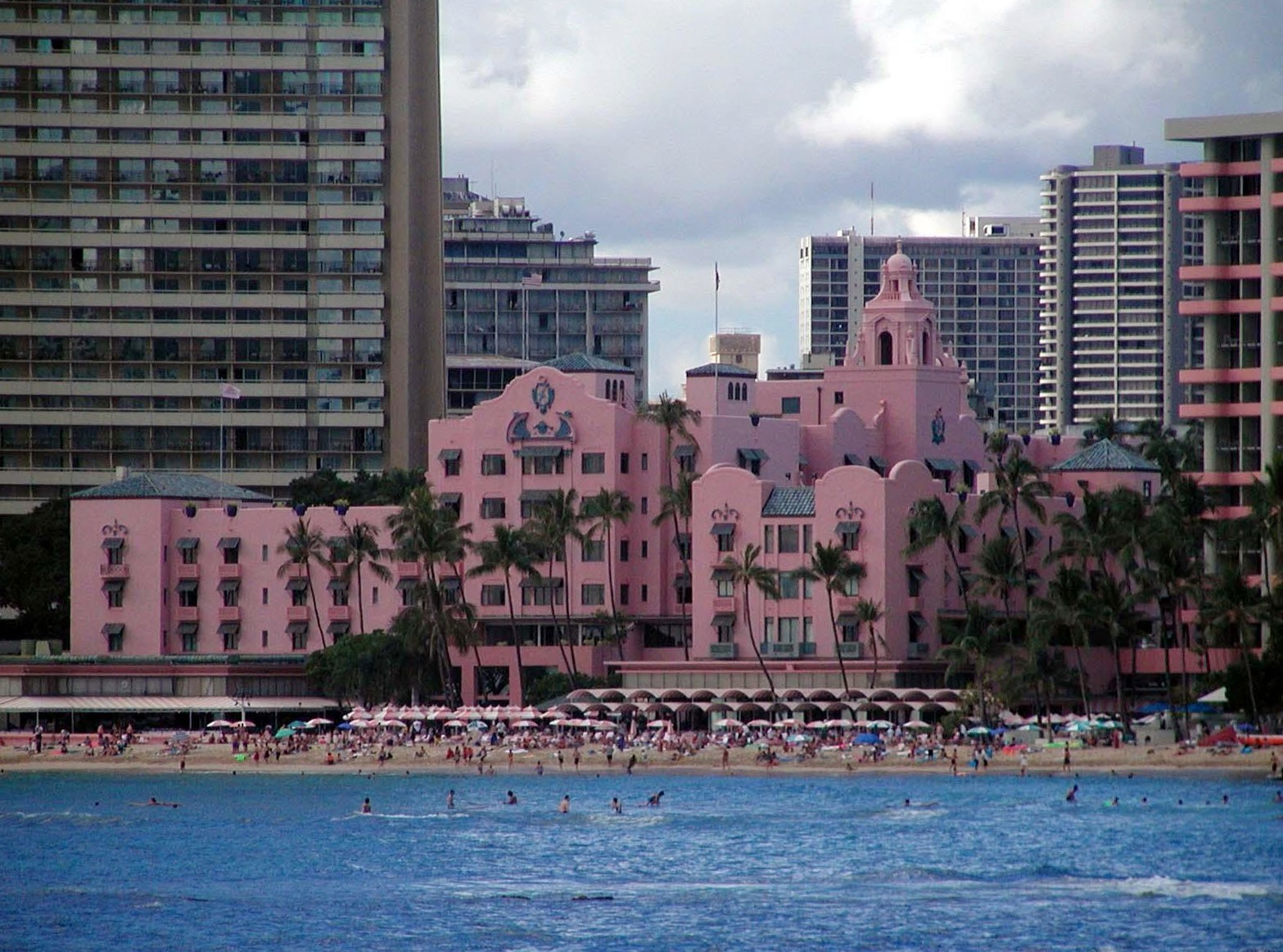
The Royal Hawaiian, seen from the sea

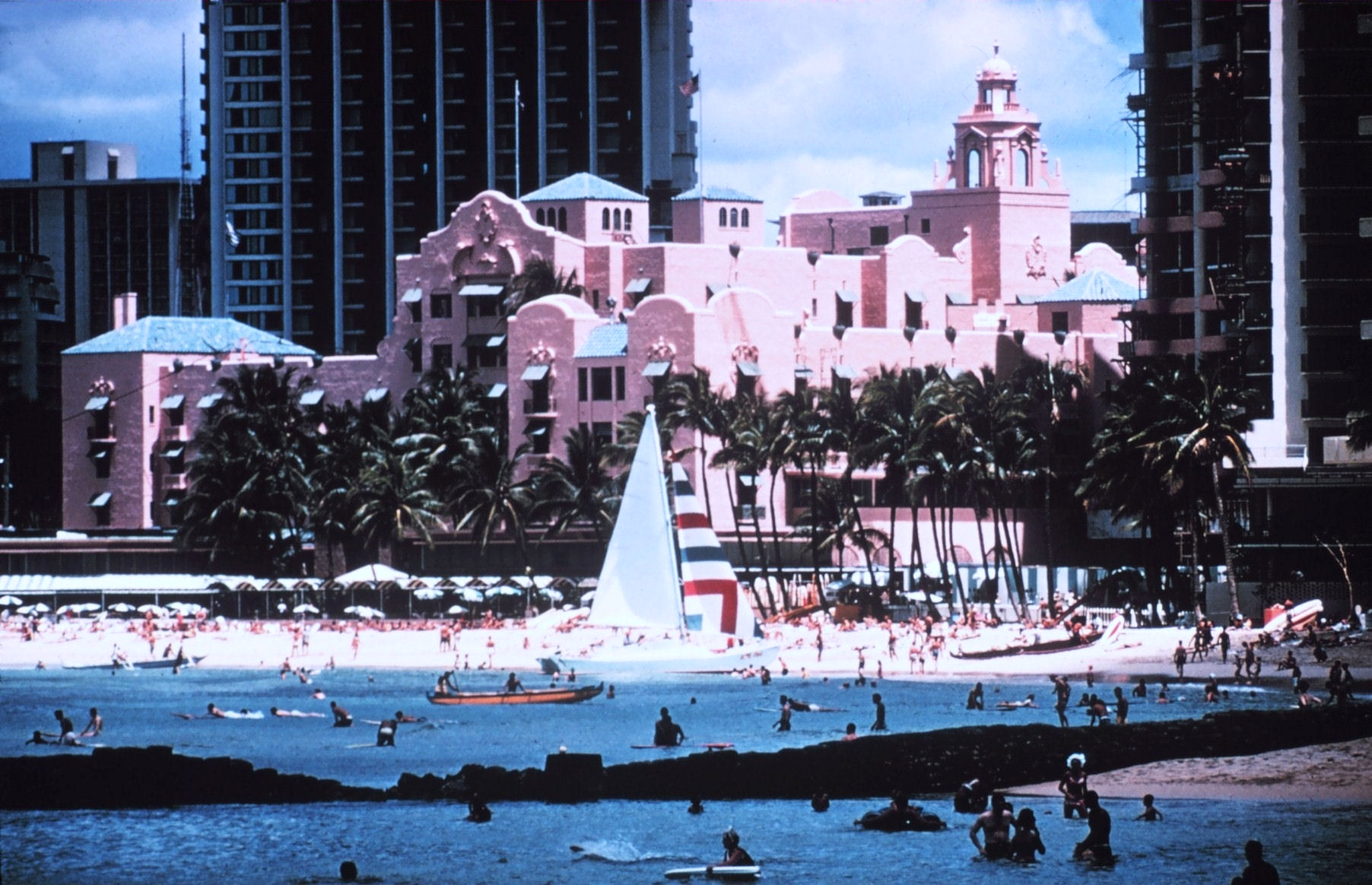
The same view in 1969.

== See also ==
- Royal Hawaiian Girls Glee Club
