= Goldfish swallowing =

Fad in American colleges in the late 1930s

The act of swallowing live goldfish was a fad first popularized by students at American colleges in the late 1930s.

== History ==
=== 20th century ===
The origin of this practice is unclear. A 1963 letter to The New York Times claimed that it was started by a man named Lothrop Withington Jr.—grandnephew of the noted genealogist Lothrop Withington—who was a freshman at Harvard University and did so to win a $10 bet as part of a bid to become class president. The stunt started a competition between multiple universities such as Penn, MIT, and Harvard in an attempt to surpass one another. In April 1939, Marie Hansen of the University of Missouri School of Journalism became the first woman widely known to participate in this trend.

The activity even prompted the establishment of the Intercollegiate Goldfish Gulping Association (IGGA), which sought to determine and enforce competition standards. The last title on record went to Clark University's Joe Deliberto, who sucked down 89 goldfish. Critics of goldfish swallowing soon emerged, such as the Society for the Prevention of Goldfish Eating, established in the spring of 1939. Additionally, Eva Williams Raymond published a poem in the Boston Herald condemning the practice:

To end this paranoiac prank,
O Harvard, how I wish
You'd put the students in a tank
And graduate the fish!

According to the Smithsonian National Museum of American History, goldfish swallowing was such a craze at universities during the 1930s that it made appearances in several news publications, including The New York Times and the Washington Post. An article in April 1939 in the Los Angeles Times called it goldfish gulping and showed a photo of someone mid-act. According to The Nashua Telegraph, a dance mimicking the goldfish gulping trend was also introduced among students, termed "doing the goldfish".

Another possibility of the origins of goldfish swallowing comes from Chicago bartenders, most notably Matt Schulien (who performed magic while tending bar at his family's restaurant). He would cut up carrots to look like goldfish tails. When performing the stunt, bartenders like Schulien would reach into a bowl of goldfish kept behind the bar while palming the carrot piece, placing it in between their pursed lips, using their tongues to lever it up and down to mimic the actions of a live fish, finally swallowing the carrot piece. That trick dates back to the 1920s, and the fad could have been started by college students fooled by the trick.

In the 1950s, the stunt became so popular that Massachusetts State Senator George Krapf filed a bill to "preserve the fish from cruel and wanton consumption."

=== 21st century ===
Although once widely practiced largely at American colleges, the stunt is rare today, but has made appearances in recent entertainment. In 2000, Jackass star Steve-O swallowed a live goldfish and regurgitated it moments later. It even evolved into an Internet challenge called "The Goldfish Challenge", which earned the disapproval of PETA, citing evidence that the practice caused the animals "needless pain". Additionally, according to The Atlantic, goldfish gulping had become a "fixture of collegiate hazing rituals", and regularly listed as offenses in lawsuits against fraternities and sports teams, notably a lawsuit against five upperclassmen and an additional member of a former swim team in the University of Virginia.

In 2014, Jack Blowers, a 20-year-old from the United Kingdom was fined £200 and banned from owning pet animals for a year by the RSPCA for gulping down two goldfish, both of which survived, alongside aquarium water, fish food, and gravel as part of a Neknomination video on Facebook. In 2019, a New Jersey man was arrested and charged with cruelty to animals, improper telephone communications, and being a fugitive from justice for more than 26 months after allegedly swallowing his ex-girlfriend's goldfish in her dorm room at Louisiana State University and sending a photograph of his feces, with the caption, "Found your fish". In October 2020, the LSU goldfish incident was expunged from his record.

== Health risks ==
Swallowing live goldfish can lead to serious health complications. Goldfish may carry parasites, bacteria like salmonella, or fungal infections that are harmful to humans. The practice poses a choking risk and can cause internal injuries due to sharp fish bones. If the practice involves goldfish bought from a pet store, a rare skin condition caused by bacteria in the water, known as aquarium granuloma, may result. This can cause skin rashes and lesions which may develop into tuberculosis. Additionally, many commercially available goldfish are treated with antiparasitic and antibacterial medicines. Some of these medicines are recognized as carcinogens and could pass on harmful effects to the consumer.

== See also ==
- Professional regurgitation
- Eating live seafood
- Panty raid
- Phonebooth stuffing
- Consumption of Tide Pods
- Flagpole sitting
