= Shipwreck Kelly =

Shipwreck Kelly may refer to:

- Alvin "Shipwreck" Kelly, an American pole sitter
- John Simms "Shipwreck" Kelly, an American football player
