= Second Generation Wayans =

- Genre: Comedy drama
- Created by: Craig Wayans; Damien Dante Wayans; Devon K. Shepard
- Starring: Damien Dante Wayans; Craig Wayans; George O. Gore II; Tatyana Ali
- Country of origin: United States
- Original language: English
- No. of seasons: 1
- No. of episodes: 10

Production
- Executive producers: Craig Wayans; Damien Dante Wayans; Devon Shepard; George O. Gore II; Marlon Wayans; Rick Alvarez
- Camera setup: Multiple
- Running time: 22 minutes
- Production company: BET Productions

Original release
- Network: BET
- Release: January 15 – March 19, 2013

Second Generation Wayans is an American comedy-drama television series that debuted on BET on January 15, 2013. It ended on March 19, 2013, after only one season.

== Premise ==
Damien Dante Wayans and Craig Wayans, nephews of the famous Wayans brothers, decide to start their own production company after struggling to break through in show business, both in front of and behind the camera. Their partner in the endeavor is honorary Wayans family member, actor George O. Gore II, whom most notably starred in My Wife and Kids.

== Cast ==
=== Main ===
- Damien Dante Wayans as himself
- Craig Wayans as himself
- George O. Gore II as himself
- Tatyana Ali as Maya

=== Recurring ===
- LeToya Luckett as Rochelle
- Rob Bouton as Tony DiNapoli
- DeRay Davis as himself
- Celeste Sullivan as Tiffany
- David Gallagher as Jeremy Silverman
- Regina Hall as herself
- Henry Simmons as Regin's new beau; Baron 'The Truth' Fouse
- Jon Abrahams as Gavriel Rosembaum

=== Guest appearances ===
- Marlon Wayans as himself
- Affion Crockett as himself
- Page Kennedy as William Stokes
- Kevin Hart as himself
- Faune A. Chambers as Keisha; Barry Silverman's assistant
- Gabourey Sidibe as herself
- Keith Robinson as Brock Matthews

== Production ==
In April 2012, BET picked up two comedy series, one of which being Second Generation Wayans. Craig Wayans, Damien Dante Wayans and George O. Gore II were announced as cast members. Later that month, Tatyana Ali joined the cast. In November, it was announced that the show would premiere on Tuesday, January 15, 2013 at 10:30 PM, following the premiere of BET's other scripted comedy Real Husbands of Hollywood.

== Episodes ==
| No. | Title | Original release date | U.S. viewers (millions) |
|---|---|---|---|
| 1 | "The Arrival" | January 15, 2013 | 3.35 |
The nephews try to launch a production company while struggling with their personal life.
| 2 | "Rolling with Second Gen" | January 22, 2013 | 1.78 |
The guys land their first project for screenwriter Abraham Lovitz.
| 3 | "The Pitch" | January 29, 2013 | 1.46 |
One of the biggest agents in Hollywood agree to represent the Second Generation.
| 4 | "High Anxiety" | February 5, 2013 | 1.20 |
Tiffany watches Craig's son. Craig has writer's block. Maya helps Craig focus. Damien has panic attacks.
| 5 | "Cut!" | February 12, 2013 | 1.34 |
Damien shoots a short film. George pursues Terry Crews to star in his movie.
| 6 | "Play Hard or Go Home" | February 19, 2013 | 1.31 |
Damien, Craig, and George hit bottom. Maya struggles to figure out her own life.
| 7 | "Independence Day" | February 26, 2013 | 1.25 |
George faces financial difficulties. Damien becomes more responsible. Maya is frustrated.
| 8 | "Miss Understood" | March 5, 2013 | 1.05 |
The Atlanta film festival. Maya hangs out with film producers.
| 9 | "The Other, Other Wayans" | March 12, 2013 | 1.14 |
Damien and Craig run into obstacles. George is distracted by the past. Maya makes a major decision.
| 10 | "The Beginning of the End of the Beginning" | March 19, 2013 | 1.34 |
The guys meet with a film investor. Damien tries convinces Regina not to marry Baron. Maya starts her new job.
