= List of My Wife and Kids episodes =

The following is a list of episodes for the American television sitcom My Wife and Kids. The series ran on ABC for five seasons from March 28, 2001, to May 17, 2005, with a total of 123 episodes produced.

== Series overview ==
Season	Episodes	Originally released	
Season	Episodes	First released	Last released
1	11	March 28, 2001	May 9, 2001
2	29	September 26, 2001	May 22, 2002
3	27	September 25, 2002	May 21, 2003
4	30	September 24, 2003	May 26, 2004
5	26	September 21, 2004	May 17, 2005

== Episodes ==
=== Season 1 (2001) ===
No. overall	No. in season	Title	Directed by	Written by	Original release date	Prod. code	Viewers (millions)
1	1	"Pilot"	Andy Cadiff	Don Reo & Damon Wayans	March 28, 2001	W531	13.72
Michael and Jay are a loving and married couple who have three children: Junior, who wants to go to a concert to see MC Murder Death; Claire, who wants some privacy in her life; and little Kady, the cutest child in the house.
2	2	"The Truth Hurts"	James Widdoes	Buddy Johnson	March 28, 2001	W711	13.72
Junior gets some tattoos; Michael annoys Kady.
3	3	"Of Breasts and Basketball"	Leonard R. Garner Jr.	Eunetta T. Boone	April 4, 2001	W707	11.84
Michael doesn't take it well when he loses to his teenage son at basketball. Meanwhile, Claire thinks the best way to attract boys is to have bigger breasts, so she buys a padded bra, much to the dislike of Jay who punishes her for doing so.
4	4	"Grassy Knoll"	Ted Wass	Adam Hamburger	April 4, 2001	W709	14.29
Jay is trying to get rid of some old clothes, so after Michael opposes to that she and him make a deal that everything that is not worn by the end of the week has to go. Meanwhile, Junior is trying to learn how to play the guitar and his friend convinces him to smoke pot. Kady gets angry at Claire for avoiding her.
5	5	"Making the Grade"	Leonard R. Garner Jr.	Adam Hamburger	April 11, 2001	W702	10.12
Junior fakes an A in algebra while his family, not fooled by the charade, fakes a celebration. Meanwhile, Claire blackmails Junior because she had caught him red-handed forging his report card.
6	6	"Working It"	James Widdoes	Joshua Krist & Eric Lev	April 11, 2001	W710	12.81
Michael hires an attractive girl to tutor Junior in math and later regrets his actions. Also, Jay doesn't like the direction her relationship is going with Claire, who is turning into a typical teenager.
7	7	"Snapping and Sniffing"	Philip Charles MacKenzie	J. J. Wall	April 18, 2001	W712	10.92
Jr. is having problems at school with a bully, so Michael and Jay invite his parents over to discover some of the kid's weak points. Jr. teases the kid back and Claire punches him in the nose making Jr. feel humiliated. Meanwhile, Michael tells Jay she is not around enough, and she starts to realize that when she misses Kady's first tooth and her new "smell the cushions" thing.
8	8	"He Said, She Said"	Leonard R. Garner Jr.	Erica Montolfo	April 18, 2001	W704	12.97
When Jay asks Michael to spend less time watching TV and more time with the family, they both learn that their biggest problem is communication. Note: A reference to the Cartoon Network series The Powerpuff Girls was made during this episode.
9	9	"Breaking Up and Breaking It"	Leonard R. Garner Jr.	Howard J. Morris	April 25, 2001	W705	12.28
Michael tries to get Claire away from her new boyfriend by befriending him, but things get touchy when she dumps him. Jr. overdoes it in the bathroom. Note: Andrew McFarlane plays Roger in this episode. From "Letting Go" (season 2) onwards he will be portraying Tony Jeffers.
10	10	"A Little Romance"	Leonard R. Garner Jr.	Don Reo & Damon Wayans	May 2, 2001	W703	10.08
Michael's promiscuous brother Ken (Keenen Ivory Wayans) comes to visit with his attractive new girlfriend, Tiara (Daphnee Duplaix), who contrasts with the way Michael has just realized Jay appears.
11	11	"Hair Today, Gone Tomorrow"	Philip Charles MacKenzie	Tavon Coates	May 9, 2001	W713	9.23
Michael's accountant dies suddenly, making him take a whole new perspective about his life. He buys a wig (or a hairpiece as he likes to call it) and starts to demonstrate his love for his family in a weird way. He even buys a motorcycle and an RV, in a misguided effort to live life to its fullest.

=== Season 2 (2001–2002) ===
No. overall	No. in season	Title	Directed by	Written by	Original release date	Prod. code	Viewers (millions)
12	1	"Mom's Away"	James Widdoes	Don Reo & Damon Wayans	September 26, 2001	W714	12.26
13	2	"Mom's Away"	James Widdoes	Don Reo & Damon Wayans	September 26, 2001	W715	12.26
Jay visits her mom while Michael starts telling Kady the "story" of her birth. Meanwhile Claire's friend Charmaine is pregnant. Guest starring Raven-Symoné and Shaquille O'Neal. Note: From this episode onwards, Jennifer Freeman takes over the role of Claire Kyle, who was previously portrayed by Jazz Raycole in the first season. In the episode, Michael makes a reference in her first appearance by saying that she "looks like a different person".
14	3	"No Rules"	James Widdoes	Dean Lorey	October 3, 2001	W717	11.90
Claire, Jr., and Kady are upset that Michael's rules are way too strict since Jay left. So, they make a bet with him that they can go one week without rules. If they win: no more rules. Give up: they must hug Michael and say "I was stupid. You are the best dad in the whole world." Kady gives up quickly after Michael decides to go to McDonald's for a Happy Meal. Claire gives up after a few days when she had to go to school on Jr.'s bike, waking up late, being a social outcast, and Michael deciding he and Kady are going to see the Backstreet Boys with a third ticket and when they want to give it to Kady's doll, she decides to go. Jr. gives up on the very last day after realizing that he needs rules in his life after sleeping outside of the house all night after being locked out. Absent: Tisha Campbell-Martin as Jay
15	4	"Perfect Dad"	James Widdoes	Don Reo & Damon Wayans	October 10, 2001	W716	10.86
The kids complain that Michael is being too strict since Jay left, so they call for a family meeting where they all discuss the way they think the family should be, with no repercussions. Jr. thinks having a rapper for a dad would be cool, Claire thinks the perfect dad should be the manager of the country's #1 boy band, and Kady thinks Michael should be a big blue dragon (much like TV's Barney). Michael shows them how these versions could go wrong, and shares his thoughts of perfect children, but then his children explain how that idea could go wrong, so they agree on a truce. Absent: Tisha Campbell-Martin as Jay
16	5	"Thru Thick and Thin"	James Widdoes	Alyson Fouse	October 17, 2001	W718	12.49
When Jay returns, Michael remains silent about her obvious weight gain. The episode builds to a dream sequence, in which Janet has a nightmare and the entire family is morbidly obese after Michael decides to grow big with her.
17	6	"Michael's Garden"	James Widdoes	Buddy Johnson	October 24, 2001	W719	13.24
Michael has problems in the bathroom and needs to have a colonoscopy. Note: Singer Lou Rawls guest stars in this episode.
18	7	"He Heard, She Heard"	James Widdoes	James Vallely	October 31, 2001	W720	9.92
Michael overhears Claire's plans to sneak out to a party she was forbidden to go to and plots a scheme to catch her out.
19	8	"Let Them Eat Pie"	James Widdoes	Janis Hirsch	November 7, 2001	W722	10.34
Michael milks a punishment by making the kids eat only lemon meringue pie.
20	9	"Jay Gets Fired"	James Widdoes	James Hannah	November 14, 2001	W723	12.34
Jay gets fired but discovers how much her family needs her.
21	10	"The Whole World is Watching"	James Widdoes	Don Reo	November 21, 2001	W721	9.58
When Junior installs a webcam, his old-school parents discover the power of the Internet.
22	11	"Letting Go"	James Widdoes	Craig Wayans	November 28, 2001	W724	12.64
Kady gets a hamster (which Michael accidentally kills), and Claire develops a crush on a boy named Tony. Michael and Jay attempt to deal with the changes. This is Tony's first appearance.
23	12	"Learning to Earn It"	James Widdoes	Bruce Fine	December 12, 2001	W725	11.64
Michael decides to teach the kids how to handle money due to their inability of spending their allowance money wisely. He proposes that each kid comes up with their own business, and at the end of the week he'll double whatever profit they make.
24	13	"Quality Time"	James Widdoes	Alyson Fouse	January 16, 2002	W727	12.31
Jay feels Michael doesn't spend enough quality time with the family. Claire wants to hang out with Jr.'s basketball friends.
25	14	"Get Out"	James Widdoes	Dean Lorey	January 23, 2002	W726	12.29
Michael attempts to get his family ready for a wedding within a 15 minute deadline, knowing their reputation for always being late.
26	15	"Road Trip"	James Widdoes	Rodney Barnes	January 30, 2002	W728	12.89
The family goes on an unpleasant road trip to Paul Revere's house, to find it closed.
27	16	"Table for Too Many"	James Widdoes	Buddy Johnson	February 6, 2002	W729	14.43
28	17	"Table for Too Many"	James Widdoes	Buddy Johnson	February 6, 2002	W730	14.43
The family goes out to eat at a Japanese restaurant only to find out that they must share a table with an annoying family, the Tylers. Things get out of control between the two families, and even the restaurant employees. The two families have been enemies ever since.
29	18	"Double Date"	James Widdoes	Don Reo	February 13, 2002	W731	10.56
Michael sheepishly admits Tony is a good, religious boy after a sneaky double date to the movies with him, Claire, and Jay.
30	19	"Failure to Communicate"	Leonard R. Garner Jr.	Don Reo & Damon Wayans	February 20, 2002	W706	6.94
Jay has a hard time with Michael's parents, who are separated. Note: This episode was originally intended to air in season one, but for unknown reasons, ABC moved it to season two, which is why Jazz Raycole portrays Claire, making this episode her final appearance in the series; however, the episode is listed as the final episode of the show's first season on Disney+.
31	20	"Papa Said Knock You Out"	Wil Shriner	Damien Wayans	February 27, 2002	W732	10.53
Junior knocks out his dad in boxing on a lucky shot.
32	21	"Return of the Wall"	Andy Cadiff	James Vallely	March 4, 2002	W733	8.18
Michael takes over the coaching of Jay's girls soccer team only to find his opponents are Jay's new team.
33	22	"Working Relationship"	James Widdoes	Janis Hirsch	March 20, 2002	W734	9.91
Jay badgers Michael into giving her a job, where she soon begins to get ideas above her station.
34	23	"Jr. Kyle, Boy Genius"	James Widdoes	Rodney Barnes	March 27, 2002	W735	12.08
Junior thinks he got a 1600/1600 on his SAT's but gets it confused with a girl named Michelle Kyle. Jr. got a 200/1600, even though you get 300 for spelling your name right.
35	24	"Back Story"	John Bowab	Kim Wayans	April 3, 2002	W736	10.40
Michael suffers a back spasm playing Twister but fakes a more serious injury to garner sympathy from his family and makes their lives hell as they look after him.
36	25	"Make Over"	Jonathan Schmock	Dean Lorey	May 1, 2002	W737	10.37
Jay gets a makeover after being compared to an old flame from high school.
37	26	"The Bowling Show"	Sheldon Epps	Valencia Parker	May 8, 2002	W738	9.90
The Kyles face the Tylers in bowling. The Tyler girl tries to charm Junior into throwing the ball and not caring.
38	27	"Jr. Gets His License"	Rob Schiller	James Vallely	May 15, 2002	W741	10.31
Jr. gets his license and buys an old clunker instead of what Michael chooses for Jr.
39	28	"Anniversary"	Will Mackenzie	Kim Wayans	May 22, 2002	W739	9.79
40	29	"Anniversary"	Will Mackenzie	Kim Wayans	May 22, 2002	W740	9.79
Jay gets mad at Michael because she thinks he forgot about their anniversary. Michael pulls off a lavish ceremony for the renewal of their vows. Guest stars Brian McKnight.

=== Season 3 (2002–2003) ===
No. overall	No. in season	Title	Directed by	Written by	Original release date	Prod. code	Viewers (millions)
41	1	"The Kyles Go to Hawaii: Parts 1 & 2"	Andy Cadiff	James Vallely & Dean Lorey	September 25, 2002	W742	14.82
42	2	"The Kyles Go to Hawaii: Parts 1 & 2"	Andy Cadiff	James Vallely & Dean Lorey	September 25, 2002	W743	14.82
The Kyles go to Hawaii. Junior gets to know Leilani and Michael and Jay spend more time together. Meanwhile, Claire and Kady run up a huge hotel bill by charging things to the room. The Kyles have to scramble to leave Hawaii when they discover their flight leaves much earlier than they thought.
43	3	"The Kyles Go to Hawaii: Part 3"	Andy Cadiff	Dean Lorey & Jim Vallely	October 2, 2002	W744	13.72
44	4	"Samba Story"	Andy Cadiff	Kim Wayans	October 9, 2002	W745	13.05
Jay suggests samba lessons to improve her relationship with Michael.
45	5	"Diary of a Mad Teen"	Andy Cadiff	Craig Wayans	October 16, 2002	W747	13.88
Jay "accidentally" reads Claire's diary. Meanwhile, Michael temporarily goes blind during an optometrist's exam and Junior betrays him as his chauffeur to go to a girl named Alicia's house.
46	6	"Claire's New Boyfriend"	Andy Cadiff	Damien Wayans	October 23, 2002	W748	13.89
Claire drops Tony for zip-code boy 1040-EZ, because her father displayed a liking for Tony.
47	7	"Crouching Mother, Hidden Father"	Andy Cadiff	Rodney Barnes	October 30, 2002	W749	12.87
Jay takes charge of Kady's Kindergarten play but falls ill, leaving Michael to fill the void. He allows the kids to do whatever they want.
48	8	"The Fighting Kyles"	Andy Cadiff	Buddy Johnson	November 6, 2002	W746	11.73
Michael and Jay intervene when Claire and Jr. are fighting with each other.
49	9	"Sister Story"	Andy Cadiff	Kim Wayans	November 13, 2002	W750	12.94
Michael's sister, Kelly (Vivica A. Fox), comes to visit, sparking a rivalry with Jay.
50	10	"Jr.'s Dating Dilemma"	Andy Cadiff	Rodney Barnes	November 20, 2002	W751	13.45
Junior asks two girls out to a dance. Valerie really likes Junior, and Amber (played by Claudette Ortiz) doesn't. He dumps Valerie for Amber, a hot chick that wants to date Junior to make her old boyfriend jealous. Jay becomes jealous when she dreams that Michael is in love with Janet Jackson.
51	11	"Jay the Artist"	Andy Cadiff	Dean Lorey	November 27, 2002	W752	9.16
Michael tries a family "Art week" for all. Junior does an awkward poetic drumming stance, while Claire designs jeans for her dad. Franklin and Kady do a piano short, while Jay's grand finale portrays a naked Michael Kyle.
52	12	"Chair Man of the Board"	Andy Cadiff	Janis Hirsch	December 4, 2002	W753	12.65
Michael struggles to deal with the fact his friend Tommy (Mos Def) is paralysed after falling from his roof while painting and now uses a wheelchair. Claire is caught shoplifting, when it's really Kady's fault.
53	13	"Open Your Heart"	Damien Wayans	Kim Wayans	December 11, 2002	W754	11.77
Michael and Jay attend a couple's seminar only to discover their relationship is not as strong as they thought.
54	14	"Michael's Tribe"	Damien Wayans	James Vallely	January 8, 2003	W755	10.87
Michael is chosen to lead a little girl's Indian tribe. He trains them to fetch him things and names a girl "Fetchmebeer". Tony tries to sneak in to party with Claire, but the kids attack him at midnight.
55	15	"Blackout"	Andy Cadiff	Buddy Johnson	January 22, 2003	W757	11.30
A blackout all over Connecticut, which includes the Kyle household. The family plays games and eat most of the contents of the fridge. Kady pretends to cute, while Junior takes to being a nudist.
56	16	"Man of the Year"	Andy Cadiff	Kim Wayans	January 29, 2003	W758	11.25
Michael mistakenly thinks he wins the "Small Businessman of the Year" award. When he loses, his family rescues him and makes him "Father of the Year". Meanwhile, Claire takes makeup from Jay, even though Jay has repeatedly told her not to because she is allergic to many makeup products and has sensitive skin, and wounds up having an allergic reaction to the eyeliner that she took from her mother, which causes her eyes to swell and puff up.
57	17	"Jr.'s Risky Business: Part 1"	Damien Wayans	Rodney Barnes	February 5, 2003	W756	12.90
Jay and Michael return from a night out to find Junior and his new girlfriend Vanessa in a compromising position. Michael throws him out of the house, and he ends up living in a tent in the back garden until everything has calmed down.
58	18	"Jr.'s Risky Business: Part 2"	Damien Wayans	Rodney Barnes	February 12, 2003	W759	12.55
59	19	"Jury Duty"	Andy Cadiff	Dean Lorey	February 19, 2003	W760	11.14
Michael and Jay go for Jury. Michael thinks he meets a man from the mafia; he is really a life insurance salesman.
60	20	"Here Comes Da Judge"	Andy Cadiff	William Jay Bennett & Kevin Carraway	February 26, 2003	W761	10.56
Junior and Claire find a wallet and come to brawl because Junior claims it. Consequently Michael holds court with Franklin and Kady defending Junior while Claire gets support from Jay and judges them to share.
61	21	"Claire's Permit"	Andy Cadiff	Bill Vallely	March 26, 2003	W762	10.40
Claire knows nothing about driving, and she steals the car to drive the Sip N' Go. Michael goes through an elaborate scheme to pretend the car is stolen.
62	22	"Sharon's Picture"	Ron Moseley	Kim Wayans	April 9, 2003	W765	9.15
Jay thinks Michael is "cheating" on her with a picture of his ex-girlfriend. Franklin has trouble admitting that his little sister Aretha is an outstanding singer and is superior compared to Kady.
63	23	"Tee for Too Many"	Peter Filsinger	Alyson Fouse	April 30, 2003	W766	8.31
Michael gets aggravated with Jay because she intrudes his golf.
64	24	"The Big Bang Theory"	Andy Cadiff	Craig Wayans & Damon Wayans Jr.	May 7, 2003	W763	9.56
Michael and Jay are shocked when Claire and Tony declare that they are going to have sex for the first time, and set about doing everything possible to stop them.
65	25	"Not So Hostile Takeover"	Guy Distad	Valencia Parker	May 14, 2003	W764	9.21
Micheal and Jay chaperone Claire's first prom, however, Jay uses the occasion to make up for her prom she missed 18 years before. While helping Junior in fixhis first car, Micheal decides to teach him a lesson.
66	26	"Graduation"	Eric Laneuville	Don Reo	May 21, 2003	W767	9.59
67	27	"Graduation"	Eric Laneuville	Don Reo	May 21, 2003	W768	9.59
While Junior's graduation is a joyous occasion, Jay and Michael are worried about his future as they want him to go college and keep some distance from Vanessa. However, Junior receives life-changing news that threatens to put those plans on hold.

=== Season 4 (2003–2004) ===
No. overall	No. in season	Title	Directed by	Written by	Original release date	Prod. code	Viewers (millions)
68	1	"From Dummy to Daddy"	Eric Laneuville	Don Reo	September 24, 2003	401	13.61
Michael is shocked to learn Junior is going to be a father, and reluctantly gives him a job - only to sack him on his first day for turning up late and performing unsatisfactory work. Note: The role of Vanessa Scott is now played by Brooklyn Sudano, replacing Meagan Good.
69	2	"The Sweet Hairafter"	Eric Laneuville	Kevin Knotts	September 24, 2003	403	13.61
Michael's friend Jimmy (David Alan Grier) has a hair-growth pill that makes him paranoid. Once Michael starts to take the pills, he displays the same symptoms.
70	3	"Jr. Executive"	Eric Laneuville	Kevin Rooney	October 1, 2003	402	11.64
Junior gets a job at his dad's business, Kyle Trucking.
71	4	"Jay Goes to School"	Damien Wayans	Kim Wayans	October 8, 2003	404	10.93
Jay decides to go to college.
72	5	"Meet the Parents"	Damien Wayans	Kim Wayans	October 15, 2003	405	10.85
Junior goes over to tell Calvin and Jasmine Scott (Vanessa's parents) that their daughter is pregnant. But it ends up as a family feud when Michael finds out how intimidating the parents are.
73	6	"He's Having a Baby"	Damien Wayans	Aeysha Carr	October 22, 2003	407	12.34
Michael tries to teach Junior a lesson in parenting when he gives him a balloon to take care of. Meanwhile, Jay teaches Kady about the birds and the bees. Kady misinterprets the meaning and puts pumpkin seeds in her belly button.
74	7	"The Funeral"	Damien Wayans	James Vallely	October 29, 2003	406	10.12
After the death of his 103-year-old grandma, Larry (Sean Whalen) takes advantage of the Kyles.
75	8	"Ultrasound"	Dean Lorey	Dean Lorey	November 5, 2003	409	10.41
Vanessa gets an ultrasound. Michael blurts out the sex of the baby even though neither Jay or any of the rest of the family want to know.
76	9	"Marathon"	Eric Laneuville	Damien Wayans	November 12, 2003	408	11.60
Michael cheats at running a marathon with Jay. Tony is realizing that he cannot control his hormones around Claire.
77	10	"While Out"	Guy Distad	Craig Wayans & Damon Wayans Jr.	November 19, 2003	410	12.57
Much to Claire's delight, Michael and Jay forget to recite their house rules — "No friends, no fires, no freedom, no fun" - before going out for the night. As a result, Claire decides to throw a party so she can get in with the so-called right crowd. Things get raucous when someone spikes the punch and a drunken Tony fulfills a fantasy and streaks down the street naked.
78	11	"Michael's Band"	Guy Distad	Damien Wayans	November 26, 2003	411	9.24
Michael meets Johnny "Saxophone" Jackson, his old classmate. Michael lies about playing piano, and Johnny asks to have Michael sit in with the band. But he just fakes playing the piano by hiding Franklin under his shirt. Guest star: Clarence Clemons as Johnny.
79	12	"The Lady is Not a Tramp"	Peter Filsinger	Rodney Barnes	December 10, 2003	412	11.09
Vanessa and Junior get a dog to help prepare for the coming baby. Kady is allergic to the dog, so Jay makes Junior give Kady her allergy medications. Kady mistakenly medicates the dog. Michael plans to teach him a lesson by having Kady pretend she's a dog. Meanwhile, Tony comes back from his forty-day purification. Michael finds condoms in Claire's backpack and thinks that Tony and Claire are planning to have sex.
80	13	"Of Mice and Men"	Ron Moseley	Valencia Parker	December 17, 2003	413	9.19
Michael goes through an elaborate scheme to kill a mouse.
81	14	"Moving on Out"	Ron Moseley	Craig Wayans	January 7, 2004	414	11.42
Junior moves out into a run-down apartment in a bad neighborhood.
82	15	"Candy Wars"	Dean Lorey	Dean Lorey & James Vallely	January 21, 2004	415	8.09
Michael goes overboard in his commitment to Kady's candy bar sale for school.
83	16	"Jr. Sells His Car"	Damien Wayans	Don Reo	February 4, 2004	416	9.61
Junior sells his car. Meanwhile, Franklin is having social-skills problems.
84	17	"The Anniversary Present"	Damien Wayans	Elvira Wayans & Damien Wayans	February 11, 2004	418	10.01
Michael and Jay give each other disappointing gifts.
85	18	"Illegal Smile"	Kim Wayans	Kevin Rooney	February 18, 2004	417	9.81
Michael has a court case the day after getting a botox injection, and ends up in jail.
86	19	"Outbreak Monkey"	George O. Gore II	Kerry Parker	February 25, 2004	420	10.43
Michael gets tickets to go see LeBron James, but when the family come down with the flu he comes up with crazy ideas to keep from spreading the disease. James catches the flu anyway. Note: Three days before the episode aired, James' team, the Cleveland Cavaliers, played the New York Knicks at Madison Square Garden. Although this wasn't James' first game against the Knicks (like Michael explained) it was his first game at Madison Square Garden.
87	20	"Empty Nest"	Peter Filsinger	Kevin Rooney	March 3, 2004	422	9.03
88	21	"Empty Nest"	Peter Filsinger	Kevin Rooney	March 3, 2004	423	9.03
A clip show of Michael and Jay thinking back on several mishaps that have occurred on the show over the years.
89	22	"Calvin Comes to Stay"	Damien Wayans	Rodney Barnes	March 10, 2004	419	8.75
Vanessa's father Calvin has a fight with his wife and moves in with the Kyle family.
90	23	"Calvin Goes to Work"	Eric Laneuville	Rodney Barnes	March 31, 2004	425	8.91
Calvin starts work at Kyle Trucking, but Michael has to fire him.
91	24	"Romantic Night"	Dean Lorey	Dean Lorey	April 21, 2004	424	7.54
Jay and Michael try to have a romantic night at a fancy hotel, but Junior mistakenly cancels their reservation.
92	25	"The Director"	Dean Lorey	Dean Lorey	April 28, 2004	421	6.99
When Michael accidentally records a basketball game over a video of Kady's first steps, he tries to stage a re-enactment.
93	26	"The Maid"	Damien Wayans	Rodney Barnes, Valencia Parker & Shane Miller	May 5, 2004	426	7.52
Mrs. Hopkins, the maid (Betty White) joins the Kyle household, and she is nearly a saint. An all-around person who loves basketball, cooks, and even sews new outfits. The family finds it to be a bit too much.
94	27	"Hand Model"	James Valelley	Dean Lorey	May 12, 2004	429	8.66
Claire auditions for a modeling career, disobeying her father. But Michael is the one who gets the job – as a hand model.
95	28	"What Do You Know?"	Craig Wayans	Elvira Wayans & Damien Wayans	May 19, 2004	430	8.10
The family hold a games night that ends up turning into a disaster because the men don't know anything about their wives. But it turns out the women don't know anything about their husbands, either.
96	29	"The Baby"	Kim Wayans	Kim Wayans & Kevin Knotts	May 26, 2004	427	7.80
97	30	"The Baby"	Kim Wayans	Kim Wayans & Kevin Knotts	May 26, 2004	428	7.80
Vanessa practices home labor and is helped by a midwife named Summer Breeze. Michael writes a script for the time before Vanessa gives birth. But when it's time for the baby to be born, Claire has taken the car to the mall, and no one follows the script. Vanessa ends up having the baby in the parents' bed, the same place it was conceived. Note: Damon Wayans and Kelly Coffield Park were both cast members on In Living Color.

=== Season 5 (2004–2005) ===
No. overall	No. in season	Title	Directed by	Written by	Original release date	Prod. code	Viewers (millions)
98	1	"Fantasy Camp"	Dean Lorey	Don Reo & Kerry Parker	September 21, 2004	501	9.35
99	2	"Fantasy Camp"	Dean Lorey	Don Reo & Kerry Parker	September 21, 2004	502	9.35
Michael goes to Michael Jordan's fantasy basketball camp in Las Vegas.
100	3	"Childcare Class"	Kim Wayans	Rodney Barnes	September 28, 2004	503	7.38
Michael fails a child-care course for grandparents, so Vanessa and Jr. refuse to let him baby-sit his grandchild for the rest of the week, but they forgive him when he manages to quiet the baby's nonstop crying. Note: This marks a reunion between guest star Kim Coles and Damon Wayans. The two co-starred together in the first season of In Living Color.
101	4	"Class Reunion"	Damien Wayans	Craig Wayans & Damien Wayans	October 5, 2004	504	8.06
Michael and Jay attend their high school reunion. Michael gets into a "dance battle" against his old nemesis Bobby Shaw. Guest star: Katt Williams as Bobby Shaw and Susie Castillo as Sharon
102	5	"The Fellowship of the Baby"	Damien Wayans	Damien Wayans	October 12, 2004	505	8.40
Michael tells Jr. that holding the baby will make him smarter.
103	6	"Poker Face"	Damien Wayans	Valencia Parker	October 19, 2004	506	8.58
When Jay spoils Michael's poker game, Michael gets her back by being involved in her book club.
104	7	"The Proposal"	Guy Distad	Kerry Parker	November 9, 2004	507	8.84
Jr. decides to propose to Vanessa. Michael and Jay prepare to compete against each other in a karaoke competition.
105	8	"Restaurant Wars"	Damien Wayans	Lisa D. Hall	November 16, 2004	508	8.51
Jay opens a Soul Food restaurant and Michael becomes a little too over-competitive with the neighboring Chinese Food restaurant.
106	9	"The Return of Bobby Shaw"	Damien Wayans	Craig Wayans & Damien Wayans	November 23, 2004	509	8.35
Bobby Shaw tricks Jr. into becoming his slave. Guest star: Katt Williams as Bobby Shaw
107	10	"The Wedding"	Dean Lorey	Rodney Barnes	November 30, 2004	510	9.38
Junior and Vanessa get married.
108	11	"Careful What You Wish For"	Peter Filsinger	Valencia Parker	January 11, 2005	513	9.10
When Jay wishes that Michael would give her the kind of romantic attention that she sees newlywed Vanessa getting from Jr., Michael decides to kill Jay with kindness so he can get back to watching TV and ignoring her. Meanwhile, Franklin tells Kady that he thinks he's too short and goes to great lengths to appear otherwise.
109	12	"They Call Me El Foosay"	Guy Distad	Kevin Knotts	January 18, 2005	511	6.27
Vanessa buys a foosball table for Junior, but Michael hogs it and begins behaving insufferably after beating every other member of the family in the game.
110	13	"Study Buddy"	Ron Moseley	Kim Wayans	January 25, 2005	512	6.56
Jay thinks that her professor in psychology (played by James Avery) has it in for her. Michael tries to help her study by using flash cards. In the end he resorts to bribing the professor to postpone the exam.
111	14	"Sweetheart's Day"	Ron Moseley	Dean Lorey	February 1, 2005	514	6.82
Jay makes up a holiday called Sweetheart's Day and insists that Michael buy her a gift.
112	15	"Silence is Golden"	Kim Wayans	Kim Wayans	February 8, 2005	515	6.25
Michael reluctantly accompanies Jay on a meditation weekend, where he has trouble following the rule of silence.
113	16	"Bahamas: Part 1"	Dean Lorey	Don Reo	February 15, 2005	516	6.53
The Kyles take a family trip to the Bahamas. Michael runs into his old co-worker (David Alan Grier); Junior starts hanging out with a guy named Dave; Kady finds herself in the middle of a "puppy love" triangle with Franklin and his look-alike, Francesco Mumfordi; Claire gets drunk. Michael and Jay get stranded on an island and are saved by Michael's old co-worker; Junior learns that Dave is gay; Franklin confronts Francesco at his conference for his work, which Franklin maintains was plagiarized.
114	17	"Bahamas: Part 2"	Dean Lorey	Don Reo	February 22, 2005	517	6.80
115	18	"The Remodel"	James Wilcox	Ron Zimmerman	March 1, 2005	521	6.95
Jay insists that the accommodations for Jr. and his family need to be remodeled. Michael can't handle the job, and hires a contractor.
116	19	"Michael Joins a Gym"	George O. Gore II	Kim Wayans & Kevin Knotts	March 8, 2005	519	7.43
Michael joins the gym after a muscular former classmate (Terry Crews) attracts Jay.
117	20	"Celibacy"	Vito Giambalvo	Elvira Wayans	March 15, 2005	520	6.33
When Jay tells Michael that their love life will be even better if they are celibate for six months, Michael is willing to abide by her wishes, although reluctantly. Meanwhile, Franklin and Kady plant some seeds in the ground to symbolize their growing love for each other, but the seeds grow into an ingredient for a love potion that Jay uses to spice up her romantic dinner for Michael.
118	21	"Jr's Cartoon"	Randy Fletcher	Kim Wayans	March 29, 2005	524	6.60
Jr. creates a cartoon called "My Wife & Kid", which wins a prize and has a chance of getting on TV.
119	22	"Michael's Sandwich"	Damien Wayans	Dean Lorey	April 12, 2005	526	5.72
Michael's tries to leave for a golfing trip with a friend, but the family keeps distracting him.
120	23	"Graduation Day"	Craig Wayans	Aeysha Carr	April 26, 2005	522	5.28
Jay is ready to graduate from college, but a series of events ruin her appearance.
121	24	"Michael Sells the Business"	Mattie Carruthers	Kevin Rooney	May 3, 2005	525	5.66
Michael sells his trucking business to spend more time with Jay and Junior Junior. Guest star: Katt Williams as Bobby Shaw
122	25	"RV Dreams"	Damien Wayans	Kim Wayans & Kevin Knotts	May 10, 2005	518	5.28
Michael buys an R.V. and the family heads to the Grand Canyon for a vacation.
123	26	"The 'V' Story"	Tisha Campbell-Martin	Kerry Parker	May 17, 2005	523	5.93
Jay asks Michael to get a vasectomy, but he says no. Eventually he tells Jay that he will go through with it, but then backs out at the last second. Jay says that she will instead get a hysterectomy. After she comes out of the clinic, Michael tells her that he will get the vasectomy, but she then reveals that she is pregnant, which ends the series on an unresolved cliffhanger.
