= Panty raid =

1950s American college prank

A panty raid is a prank occurring in American coeducational colleges in the 1940s, '50s and '60s; the term dates to February 1949. It consisted of a horde of male students attempting to invade living quarters of female students and steal their panties as trophies.

== History ==
Panty raids were the first college craze after World War II, following 1930s crazes of goldfish swallowing, and of stuffing numbers of people into a phone booth. The mock battles that ensued between male and female students echoed the riotous battles between freshmen and upperclassmen, which were an annual ritual at many colleges in the 20th century.

The first documented incident occurred on February 25, 1949, at Augustana College, Rock Island, Illinois. Around 125 men entered the Woman's Building; the first party entered through heating tunnels beneath the building. Once inside, they unlocked the door for the remaining raiders to enter, locked the house mother in her apartment, and cut the light and phone lines. Although a few women reported missing undergarments, the goal was to cause commotion. The police arrived, and although no pranksters were charged, the news traveled, making headlines in the Chicago Tribune, Stars and Stripes, Time magazine, and The New York Times.

The next incident was on March 21, 1952, when University of Michigan students raided a dormitory, creating publicity that would spark panty raids across the nation. Penn State's first raid involved 2,000 males marching on the women's dorms on April 8, 1952, cheered on by the women, who opened doors and windows and tossed out lingerie. A May 1952 article in the Technique, Georgia Tech's student newspaper, reported that about 20 colleges had experienced panty raids, including several in the southeastern United States, such as Emory University, the University of Georgia, the University of Miami, and the University of North Carolina at Chapel Hill. By the end of the 1952 spring term, the "epidemic" had spread to 52 campuses.

Students at Columbia College and Stephens College fought off groups totaling 2,000 men from the University of Missouri.

Raiding continued, such as the raid by Princeton University men on Westminster Choir College in spring 1953. The University of Nebraska was credited with the first panty raid of 1955, when hundreds raided the women's dorms, resulting in injuries and seven suspensions. The University of California, Berkeley, had a 3,000-man panty raid in May 1956, which resulted in $10,000 in damage (equivalent to $118,421 in 2025). A group of eight students at American University were suspended for one semester following a May 1958 panty raid on Mount Vernon Junior College. At the University of Michigan, panty raids were associated with fall football pep rallies in addition to being a spring ritual in the 1950s and early 1960s.

The spring ritual continued into the 1960s. In 1961, three students were expelled from the University of Mississippi at Oxford, Mississippi, for panty raids.

== In popular culture ==
- The 1984 movie Revenge of the Nerds depicted a panty raid.
- Sleepaway Camp II: Unhappy Campers (1988) depicted a panty raid by male campers, and a retaliatory raid by the female campers.
- A panty raid was depicted in the episode "Mid-Life Crustacean" from the television series SpongeBob SquarePants. Originally aired on Nickelodeon in 2003, the episode was discontinued by the network in 2018 and later made unavailable for streaming on Amazon Prime Video and Paramount+, the latter of which acts as the service for Nickelodeon parent Paramount Skydance. While inappropriate content was given as the cause of its embargo, a specific scene was never identified. However, Petey Oneto of IGN surmises that the panty raid is the scene in question.

== See also ==
- Panty tree – Tree adorned with women's underwear, commonly found below ski lifts
- Phonebooth stuffing – Fad of trying to fit as many people in a telephone booth as possible
