= Lothrop Withington =

American genealogist (1856–1915)

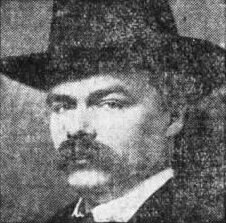
- Portrait of Withington in a 1915 newspaper
- Born: January 31, 1856; Newburyport, Massachusetts, U.S.
- Died: May 7, 1915 (aged 59); RMS Lusitania, Atlantic Ocean
- Education: University of Paris
- Occupations: Genealogist; historian; editor
- Spouse: Caroline Augusta Lloyd (m. 1892)
- Relatives: Anne Withington (sister); Lothrop Withington Jr. (nephew); Paul Withington (nephew); Leonard Withington (grandfather)

Lothrop Withington (January 31, 1856 – May 7, 1915) was an American genealogist, historian, and book editor who was killed in the sinking of the RMS Lusitania.

== Early life ==
Lothrop Withington was born on January 31, 1856, in Newburyport, Massachusetts, to Elizabeth (née Little) and Nathan Noyes Withington. His father wrote for the Newburyport Herald. His grandfather was Leonard Withington, a pastor. Withington graduated from the Putnam Free School in 1872. As a schoolboy, he learned printing and worked for the Newburyport Herald and the United States Government Publishing Office in Washington, D.C. At the age of 19, he went to France and attended lectures in the University of Paris.

== Career ==
Following his time in France, he lived in London. In the late 1870s, he moved back to Newburyport and took up politics associated with the Greenback Party. In 1880, he returned to London. He took up history and genealogy. He wrote an edition of Holinshed and a work on the Elizabethan era. Withington was a genealogist and had an office in the Journal Building in Boston. He was involved with research and editing of publications on certain aspects of the American Revolutionary War but best known was his genealogical research that included the publication of immigrant ships' passenger lists and the like.

== Personal life ==
On October 14, 1892, in London, he married Caroline Augusta Lloyd, a sister of Henry Demarest Lloyd. They had no children. He lived in Newburyport. In May 1915, he was returning to his work in the United Kingdom but lost his life on board the RMS Lusitania when it was attacked and sunk by German U-boat U-20.

His sister was Anne Withington. His nephews were Harvard football and crew men Lothrop Withington Jr. and Paul Withington. His grandnephew (a brother's grandson) was Lothrop Withington Jr., the progenitor of goldfish swallowing. He sent a postcard to the English genealogist, George Sherwood saying "Will come by the ‘Lusitania’, subject to Kaiser Wilhelm’s consent".
