= The Boo Crew =

Animated series

- Directed by: Bob Spang; Shawn Wayans
- Country of origin: United States
- Original language: English
- No. of seasons: 1
- No. of episodes: 2

Production
- Production company: Wayans Bros. Entertainment

Original release
- Network: Nicktoons Network
- Release: 2006

The Boo Crew (originally known as Thugaboo) is a series of children's animated television specials created by the Wayans Brothers. It was first aired on Nicktoons Network on August 11, 2006. Only two specials were released. As of the year of 2017, both specials have been uploaded on YouTube by Shawn Wayans on the channel titled "The Boo Crew TV", with the theme music omitted, as the series was simply re-titled "The Boo Crew".

== Plot ==
The show centers on the adventures of a group of neighborhood kids of diverse ethnic cultures known as "The Boo Crew" with D-Roc as the leader, often helping each other out and going to serious situations and learning a lesson in morals. The show features an abstract voice cast starring most of the Wayans family with the animation having some similarity to other black-centered shows such as The Proud Family. The show has a structure combination of African-American cultural endurance and adoration with ending music videos similar to Fat Albert and the Cosby Kids and the kid-centered oriented program synopsis on young love and romance commonly found in the classic Peanuts cartoon specials.

== Characters ==
=== The Boo Crew ===
- D-Roc: (voiced by George Gore II) The leader of the Boo Crew who wishes to become a successful rapper. Without his hat or bandana, it is revealed that he has a large, balding head. He likes to create get-rich-quick schemes. A running gag in the show is that when he raps, he will forget a word that rhymes with one of his lines, and an angry off-screen listener will throw a tomato or pie in his face before shouting "It's (rhyming word), STUPID!" and driving off. And has a crush on Diane Johnson
- Dee-Dee: (voiced by Countess Vaughn) D-Roc's loud-mouthed sister who aspires to be the first female president. She has a crush on DJ.
- Darren "DJ" Jobeley III: (voiced by Michael Rapaport) A white boy who acts gangster with his friends, but sophisticated with his parents. As his name implies, he is a mixmaster and carries his own turntable and boombox. He claims to be mixed and believes that he is half-black, often getting offended by how black people were and are treated.
- Lissette: (voiced by Linda Villalobos) A Latina girl who wants to become a singer and has a crush on D-Roc. She pushes her youngest brother, Luiz, around in a stroller. She is a skilled master at jump rope. Slim likes her, but she does not reciprocate his feelings.
- Slim: (voiced by Shawn Wayans) An overweight boy, despite his name, who likes eating and speaks in a slurred voice. He has a crush on Lissette.
- Dirty: (voiced by Marlon Wayans) A filthy boy who speaks in a gibberish language, often translated by the other gang members. The only thing that is clean about him are the sneakers he wears. He is a master at beatboxing, often doing it for the kids' raps.
- Money: (voiced by Aries Spears) D-Roc's pet dog who can talk. He is seen wearing a baseball cap and red sneakers. When D-Roc gives him dog food, he ships it to Africa, where it is used to build houses. He also eats D-Roc's homework. His voice is modeled after the late rapper DMX.
- Gwenny: (voiced by Heather McDonald) An eco-friendly valley girl who loves the environment, but throws spray cans on the ground after using them and wears a fur coat. She does not seem to notice when she goes against her beliefs.
- Chad: (voiced by Johnny Abrahams) A skater punk and Gwenny's younger brother. He often gets injured, such as when he broke his arm or fell in a trash can. He is almost never seen without his helmet and skateboard.
- Soo Young: (voiced by Nancy Lee) An Asian girl whose father has many jobs. She is very creative and sometimes helps D-Roc with his get-rich-quick schemes, such as when she created a business selling knock-off Air Jareds with him.
- Baby Luiz: Lissette's youngest brother whom she pushes in a stroller. He is mostly seen with a blue pacifier. Despite his appearance, he is actually starting 1st grade, even though he wears a toupee, shaves, and can rap. He only speaks Spanish, unlike his bilingual sister.

=== Adults ===
- Momma: D-Roc's cheapskate mother who likes talking on the incredibly long-wired telephone, which she even takes with her in the mall. She is still married as revealed in the Christmas special telling D-Roc that his father is still sleeping.
- Principal Eyeverson: Also known as Principal Wanderingeye, he is the nearsighted principal at the Boo School who has a lazy eye and has trouble seeing or telling people apart but is very kind and generous.
- Miss Attitude: A lady often speaking in the megaphone (with her lips visible) in charge of the summer program, a mall and as the public speaker announcer in the school often complaining about her job talking care of the Boo Crew for the summer. A similar women (or maybe the same person) appeared later in the special calling D-Roc to the principal's office to order his bootlegged Air Johnsons for her and her kids.
- Darren Jobeley, Sr.: DJ's sophisticated father speaking in a royal mannerism and has bridge nights.
- Jared: A dim-witted basketball player who never passed the 3rd grade but is a talented athlete. He is a parody of Michael Jordan.
- Lee Young: Soo Young's rich father who owns a taxi service, dry cleaning business, sushi restaurant and a grocery store called "Foo's Fruits". Despite being tired, him with only one job would make him a lazy beggar. He is nice enough to offer snacks of raw fish to D-Roc and proceeds to eat them whole if they decline.
- Joyce: A rival with Momma who lost to the bargain fight sale. She may also fight with Momma in the upcoming Thanksgiving sale.
- Mr. Johnson: Diane's father and the owner of the supermarket who sells Air Johnsons.

=== Other characters ===
- Diane Johnson: A mixed-half Korean half black girl and classmate of D-Roc who she is in a relationship with. Her father is the owner of Johnson's Supermarket who produced the Air Johnsons shoes which no one bought and liked D-Roc for being the first customer to actually buy them and love them.
- O. Jenkins: A native African who frequently receives the dog food that Money keeps shipping to him and his tribe, which they use to build their houses. At one point, D-Roc tried to send them his Air Johnsons' but they returned them due to its uselessness for the tribe and they even dislike the look of it.
- Big Kid: A largest boy with a name drop "HELLO! MY NAME IS BIG KID!" on his overalls whose face is hidden and was accused by Dee Dee of cutting in line and threatened to rip D-Roc's face off. D-Roc was horrified of his size and corrects him by saying that she did not say "cut in line", she said "we cut the price in half, read the sign" accompanied by creating a sign to prove its case, promoting him to get angrier by ripping D-Roc's face off because he can't see the sign due to his height. He does neither like to be accused of anything nor does he like to be lied to, which influences him to fight. A running gag for the characters' appearance is that Dee Dee would report to D-Roc about him being an "itty-bitty boy" who cut in line and threatened to beat up D-Roc if he saw him. At first, D-Roc curiously asks Dee Dee if the culprit was the feeble, nerdy white kid that was next to him but Dee Dee corrects him and points at the Big Kid, intimidating D-Roc the moment he sees him. Every time the situation occurs, the Big Kid reveals that the accusations reminds him of a similar scenario with his mother such as his mother accusing him of being born ugly, and he discovered that his mother lied about the existence of the tooth fairy right when he knocked all his teeth out. Whenever he ends hurting D-Roc, he runs home crying to his mother. On the Christmas special, he knocks D-Roc's skeleton out of his body before running.
- Gavin: A poverted-kid whose parents are unemployed but wished for a G-Bot to Mall Santa. The Boo Crew donated several of their gifts to him, including D-Roc's G-bot.
- Freddy Stickler: An older kid with huge buck-teeth and braces who, alongside his friend Sean Donovan, tend to pick on younger kids. When D-Roc confront him about his bullying by mocking his teeth, they settle it by playing the dozens, in its figurative and literal meaning by also drawing down cards.

== Voice cast ==
- George O. Gore II - D Roc
- Countess Vaughn - Dee Dee
- Shawn Wayans - Slim, Cheapie
- Marlon Wayans - Dirty, Money ("A Boo Crew Christmas")
- Linda Villalobos - Lisette, Spanish Voice
- Michael Rapaport - DJ ("Sneaker Madness")
- Eric Schwartz - DJ ("A Boo Crew Christmas")
- Nancy Lee - Soo Young
- Heather McDonald - Gwenny, Gavin's Mom
- Johnny Abrams - Chad
- Kim Wayans - Momma, Joycee
- David Alan Grier - Principal Eyeverson, Man Upstairs, Africans
- Charlie Murphy - Big Kid
- Aries Spears - Money ("Sneaker Madness"), Africans, Jay-Z
- Linden Porco - Gavin
- Bobby Lee - Mr. Lee Young, William Hung
- Kym Whitley - Ms. Attitude
- John Witherspoon - Real Santa, Singer on Radio
- Karl Kehr - Simon
- Michael Anthony Snowden - Basketball Player, Angry Parent
- Kevin Knotts - Superman, DJ's Dad
- Buddy Johnson - Outside Voice, Heckler
- Chaunté Wayans - Diane Johnson
- Craig Wayans - Man Upstairs Jr., Freddy Stickler
- Shane Miller - Sean Donovan, Soap Opera Actor
- Skye Wayans - Kid #2
- Jared Edwards - Angry Parent
- Lochlyn Munro - Gavin's Dad

== Specials ==
1. The Boo Crew: "Sneaker Madness" - When D-Roc sees a pair of expensive sneakers called Air Jareds (a parody of Air Jordans), he wants his mother to buy them to wear at school in order to look cool. His mother purchases a cheaper priced pair of Air Johnsons instead. Afraid of looking bad to his crew, D-Roc asks Soo-Young to make Air Jareds out of Air Johnsons and when they work out well, they realize they can make money by converting the shoes. Their plan to make money eventually goes awry and D-Roc is taught a lesson about being himself.
2. The Boo Crew: "A Boo Crew Christmas: A Miracle on D-Roc Street" - D-Roc, Dee-Dee, DJ, Money, Lissette, Slim, Chad, Gwenny, Soo Young (also known as The Boo Crew) are working together to find a way to bring the true meaning of Christmas home to less fortunate young Gavin and his family.

== Music ==
The Boo Crew has premiered two music videos using characters from the specials, "Just Be U" and "Gimmie Gimmie". Similar to another black-centered series, Fat Albert and the Cosby Kids, it teaches about moral lessons and virtues.

== See also ==
- Waynehead - 1990s animated series created by Damon Wayans.
