= Phone booth stuffing =

Fad of trying to fit as many people in a telephone booth as possible

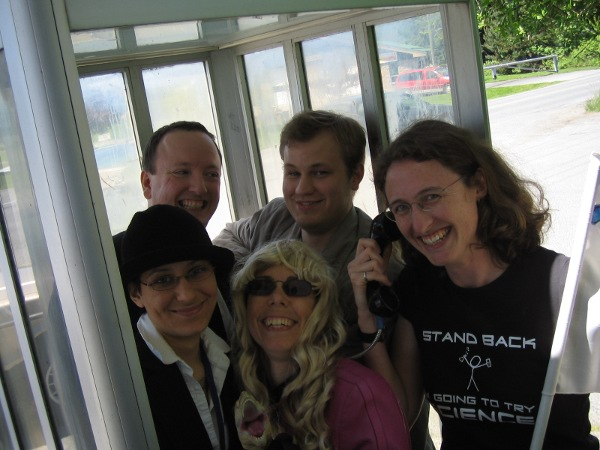
Five people in a telephone booth

Phone booth stuffing is a sporadic fad that involves a number of people consecutively entering a telephone booth until either the phone booth can accommodate no more, or there are no more individuals available. Competition to beat prior records of numbers of people has been an aspect of the fad's popularity; however, that has decreased over the decades, in part because of the reduced prevalence of fully-enclosed booths.

== Spread ==
The origins of the fad are unclear, but it was only one of several that had likely originated and become widespread in the post–World War II years. By early 1959, the fad had spread to South Africa, Southern Rhodesia, Britain, Canada, and the United States.

On March 20, 1959, students at the Durban, South Africa YMCA set a world record when 25 of them were able to squeeze at least the greater portions of their bodies into a standard upright phone booth. The participants ranged in height from 163 to 188 centimetres (5 ft 4 in – 6 ft 2 in). Very little unoccupied volume remained; when the phone rang, nobody inside had enough space free to pick up the handset and answer it.

In that same month, students at the Saint Mary's College of California in Moraga, California attempted to break the South African record in the dark of night. Later, it was recreated in daylight, where a photographer from Life magazine recorded the reenactment. The published photo became the iconic picture for the national craze. In 2009, at the 50th anniversary celebration, an attempt was made to recreate the event, but a Plexiglass panel of the booth broke.

== Subsidence ==
Although it had been referred to as "one of the all-time great fads" by the Bridgeport Post, it had come to be regarded as passé by the end of 1959. It was akin in meteoric rise and fall to the earlier fads of flagpole sitting, goldfish swallowing, and panty raids, and to the later fad of streaking. While still practiced contemporarily, it has not again achieved the social currency it had in the late 1950s.
