= Alvin "Shipwreck" Kelly =

American pole sitter (1893–1952)

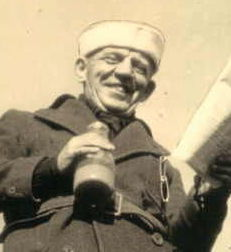
- "Shipwreck" Kelly pole sitting in 1942
- Born: Aloysius Anthony Kelly; May 11, 1893 (Note: Some accounts give Kelly's birth year as 1885.); New York City, U.S.
- Died: October 11, 1952 (aged 59); New York City, U.S.
- Other name: Shipwreck Kelly
- Occupation: Pole sitter

Aloysius Anthony Kelly (May 11, 1893 – October 11, 1952), popularly known as Alvin "Shipwreck" Kelly, was an American pole sitter who achieved fame in the 1920s and 1930s, sitting for days at a time on elevated perches throughout the United States.

== Early life ==
Kelly was born in Manhattan's Hell's Kitchen neighborhood. His mother died during childbirth and his father died before he was born. He ran away and went to sea at the age of 13, and changed his name to Alvin. In his early years he worked as a steelworker, steeplejack, high diver, boxer and movie double. He was also a licensed pilot who performed aerial stunts. He served as an ensign in the U.S. Naval Auxiliary Reserve during World War I, serving from May 1918 to September 1921. During the war he served on the USS Edgar F. Luckenbach.

== Career ==
According to one account, Kelly climbed his first pole at the age of seven, and at nine he performed a "human fly" trick, climbing up the side of a building. He is credited with popularizing the pole-sitting fad after sitting atop a flagpole in 1924, either in response to a dare from a friend or as a publicity stunt to draw customers to a Philadelphia department store. In January of that year he sat on a pole for 13 hours and 13 minutes to publicize a movie.

In 1926, Kelly set a record by sitting atop a flagpole in St. Louis, Missouri for seven days and one hour; in June 1927, he planned to beat that record by sitting for eight days in Newark, New Jersey. He would end up sitting atop the Newark pole for twelve days, and on a pole in Baltimore's Carlin's Park for 23 days in 1929. In 1930, he set a world record by sitting on a flagpole on top of the Steel Pier in Atlantic City, 225 feet (69 m) high, for 49 days and one hour.

At the height of his fame as a latter-day stylite, he toured 28 cities, charging admission to people who wanted to stand on roofs to see his performance stunts. He also earned an income from endorsements, personal appearances and books about his life. He called himself "the luckiest fool in the world." He once calculated that over two decades he spent 20,613 hours sitting on flagpoles, of which 210 were in sub-freezing weather and 1400 hours in the rain. In one 1927 stunt, he climbed on a pole on a speeding biplane, sitting on a twelve-inch (30 cm) iron crossbar as the plane flew 500 feet (150 m) high. The New York Times reported that "he didn't get around to hanging by one hand, as he promised he would."

While pole sitting, Kelly was said to have subsisted mainly on coffee and cigarettes. He learned how to nap while sitting upright, and never was secured by more than a simple leg strap. He once claimed that he does not "take as many chances as a window cleaner." Journalist Jay Maeder wrote that "The newspapers were regularly full of pictures of Shipwreck Kelly, matter-of-factly brushing his teeth and shaving his face, hundreds of feet in the air." He said that he was able to sleep while pole sitting by putting his thumbs in holes in the pole shafts. If he swayed, the pain in his thumbs would force him to right himself without waking him up.

His career began to decline after the Wall Street crash of 1929, and in 1934, he was working as a gigolo at a Broadway dance hall, Roseland, then a "dime a dance" hall. Journalist H. Allen Smith found him "wearing a tail coat and silk hat, sitting on a plush divan." By then, Kelly said, 17 people were claiming to be him, because few people knew what he looked like. In the 1930s, there was less tolerance for such stunts, and police took a dim view of the disruption it caused. In 1935, he attempted to break his Atlantic City record by sitting on a pole in the Bronx, but was aloft for less than a day before he was arrested as a public nuisance. He only climbed down from the pole after police threatened to cut it down.

One of his last major public appearances was on October 13, 1939: Kelly celebrated National Donut Dunking Week by sitting on a pole atop the Chanin Building on East 42nd Street in Manhattan and eating 13 donuts dunked into a coffee cup and fed to him while he stood on his head. However, by then that kind of work had pretty much dried up. He served in the United States Merchant Marine during World War II.

Accounts vary as to how Kelly acquired his nickname. He claimed to have survived during his lifetime five shipwrecks, two airplane and three automobile accidents, and one train wreck, all without injury. His wife told reporters that he was a survivor of the sinking of the RMS Titanic. However, there were only three Titanic survivors named Kelly and all were women, and "there is no reason to believe that he ever came near the Titanic." He is also said to have gained the nickname as a boxer, because "he was so often adrift in the ring that the handle became inevitable."

He was described in a 1939 article as a "stocky, blue-eyed, battered little Irishman" with "sparse red hair."

Kelly's last flagpole-sitting appearance was at an Orange, Texas event sponsored by the Lions Club on October 4, 1952, one week before his death. Two heart attacks forced him to come down from the 65-foot pole, and the club refused to let him go back up. He retired as a result of the heart attacks, saying "This is it. I'm through."

== Personal life ==
Kelly married an elevator operator, Frances Vivian Steele of Dallas, Texas, whom he met while pole sitting. They had a son, Alvin Kieran Kelly, who became a laborer for the Clyde Beatty Circus. In June 1973, the son was killed at the age of 45 by an elephant during a performance in Tenafly, New Jersey. A female Asiatic elephant lifted him in the air and then put him down and stepped on his chest, crushing him to death before a horrified crowd.

== Death ==
At the time of his death in October 1952, Kelly had become a "grizzled old man" – penniless and all but forgotten. He was by then a widower who had been on home relief for six months, and his son was in the U.S. Army overseas. He had been suffering from an asthmatic heart and hardening of the arteries.

Kelly died on October 11, 1952, when he was struck by a car while walking on Manhattan's West 51st Street, near the rooming house where he lived and not far from his birthplace. For a time his body was unclaimed at the morgue, but he was buried at Long Island National Cemetery in Farmingdale, New York.

Belongings found in Kelly's room included a duffel bag still packed with ropes and flagpole-sitting gear, "in case any fresh jobs came along." At the time of Kelly's death a scrapbook of his exploits was under his arm. He had titled the scrapbook "The Luckiest Fool on Earth."
