= Pole sitting =

Test of endurance

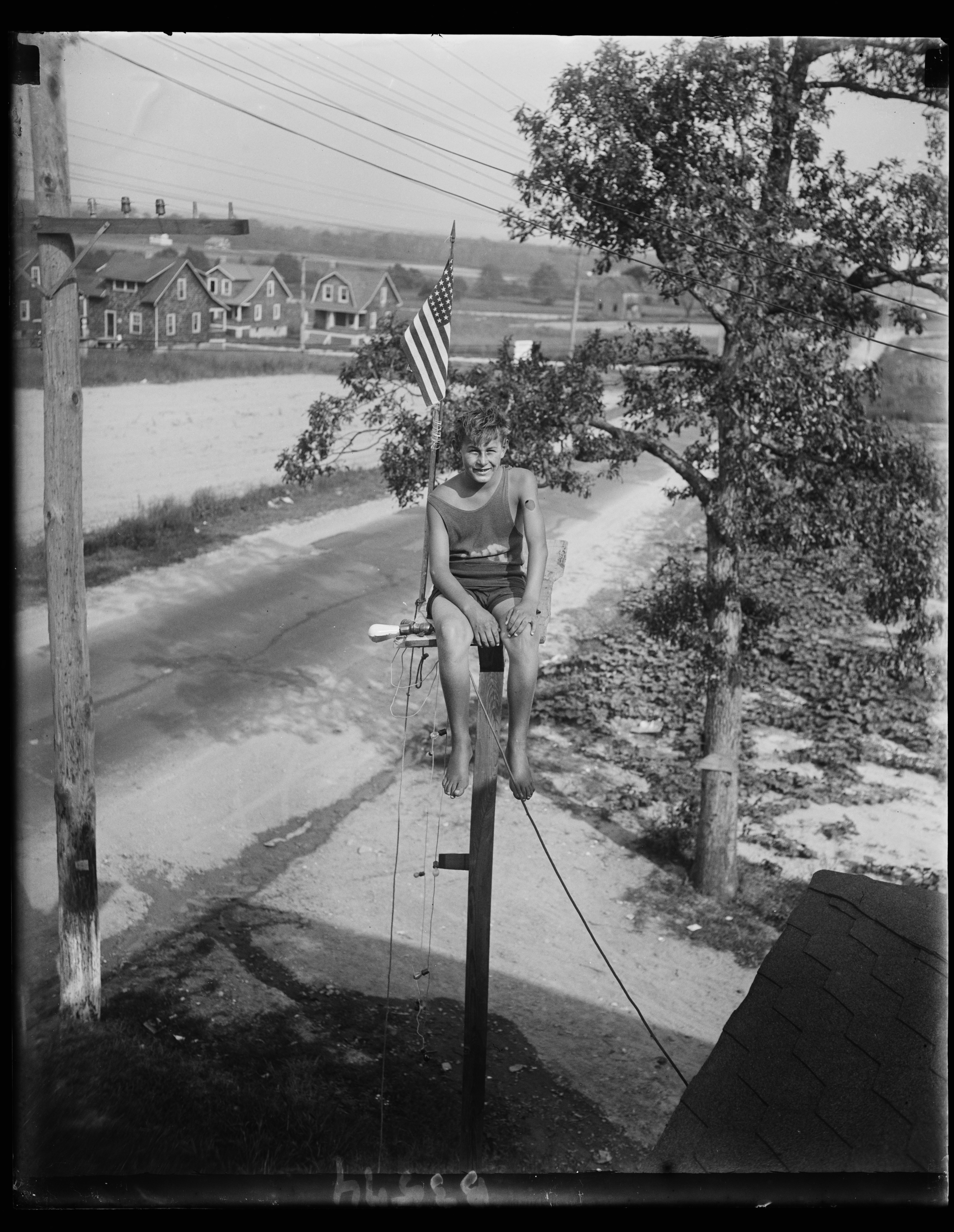
14-year-old William Ruppert breaking the pole sitting record of 23 days, in 1929

Pole sitting is the practice of sitting on top of a pole (such as a flagpole) as a test of endurance. A small platform is typically placed at the top of the pole for the sitter. Led by the stunt actor and former sailor Alvin "Shipwreck" Kelly, flagpole sitting was a fad in the mid-to-late 1920s, but mostly died out after the start of the Great Depression.

== History and 1920s fad ==
Pole sitting is predated by the ancient ascetic discipline of stylitism, or column-sitting. St. Simeon Stylites the Elder (c. 388–459) of Antioch (now Turkey) was a column-sitter who allegedly sat on a small platform on a column for 36 years.

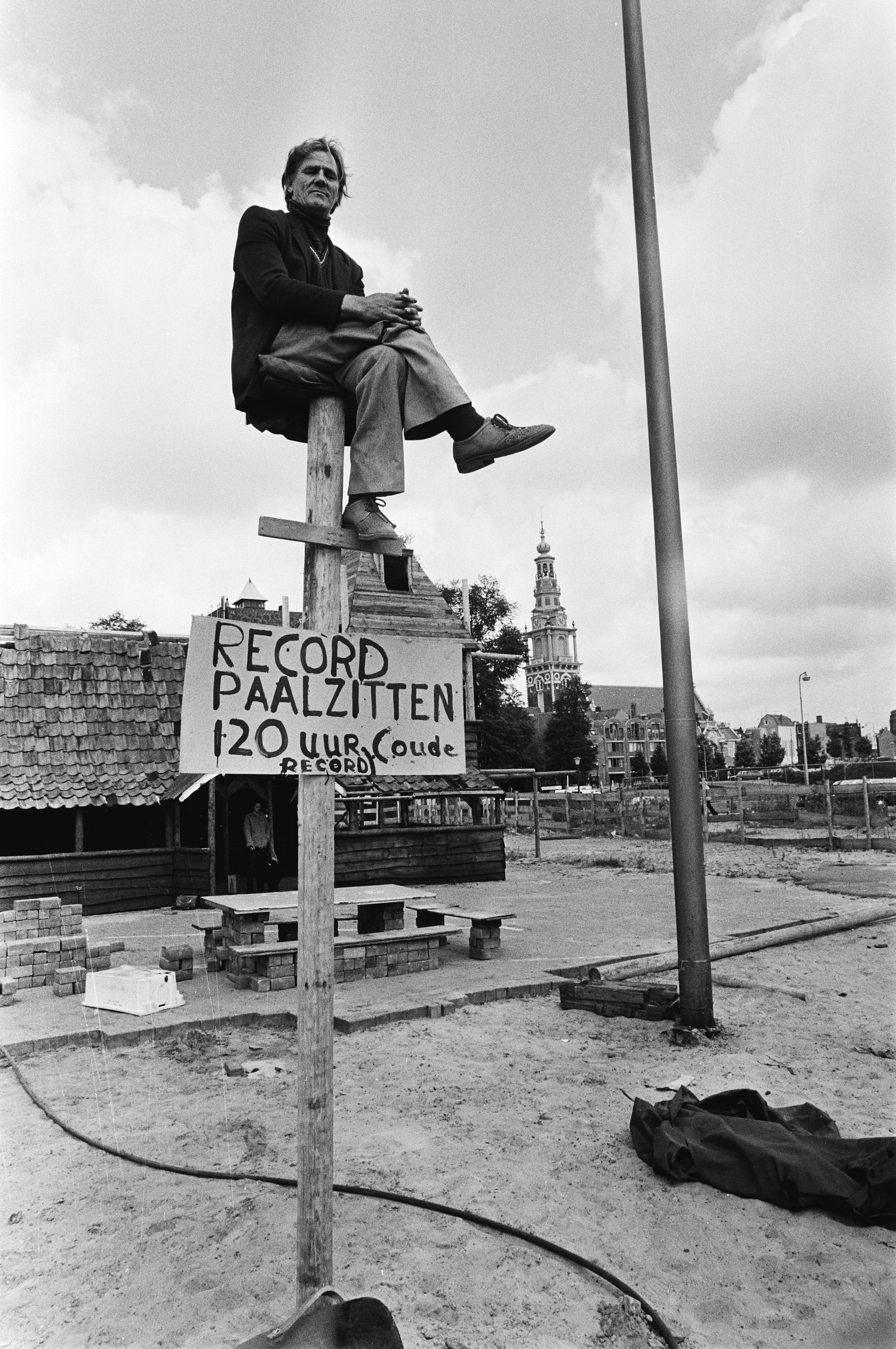
A pole sitter in Amsterdam in 1979

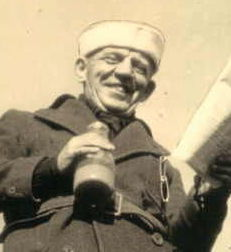
Shipwreck Kelly in 1942

Flagpole sitting was a fad in the mid-to-late 1920s. The fad was begun by stunt actor and former sailor Alvin "Shipwreck" Kelly, who sat on a flagpole, either on a dare by a friend or as a publicity stunt. Shipwreck's initial 1924 sit lasted 13 hours and 13 minutes. It soon became a fad with other contestants setting records of 12, 17 and 21 days. In 1929, Shipwreck decided to reclaim the title. He sat on a flagpole for 49 days in Atlantic City, New Jersey, setting a new record. The following year, 1930, his record was broken by Bill Penfield in Strawberry Point, Iowa, who sat on a flagpole for 51 days and 20 hours, until a thunderstorm forced him down.

For the most part, pole sitting was confined to the 1920s, ending with the onset of the Depression.

Four men sitting on crossed netted poles in a park

== Post-1930 incidents and records ==
- In 1946, Marshall Jacobs, a 37-year-old Ohio resident who was trying to revive the fad, married his fiancée Yolanda Cosmar atop a flagpole with a roost, and a photograph of them kissing gained wide attention.
- Cleveland resident Charley Lupica sat atop a flagpole platform for 117 days in 1949 to support the Cleveland Indians in their pennant race against the New York Yankees. After an argument with Yankees fans, he began sitting on a flagpole above his grocery store on May 31, claiming he would stay on the pole until the Indians either claimed first place in the standings or were eliminated from contention. The Indians never passed the Yankees, and Lupica came down during the team's final home game on September 25; owner Bill Veeck had moved Lupica and the flagpole to Cleveland Municipal Stadium the night before as a promotional stunt.
- From 1933 to 1963, Richard "Dixie" Blandy claimed various records as champion at 77, 78 and 125 days until he died on May 6, 1974 in Harvey, Illinois when the 50 feet (15 m) pole on which he was sitting collapsed.
- In 1964, a record of 217 days was set in Gadsden, Alabama, by Peggy (Townsend) Clark.
- From November 1982 to 21 January 1984 (439 days, 11 hours, and 6 minutes), H. David Werder sat on a pole to protest against the price of gasoline.
- On 25 March 2025, Tom Bedford sat on a lamppost in Abbey Road, Wimbledon for about seven hours in protest of a road closure scheme.

== Television ==
- On the game show What's My Line, hosted by John Charles Daly, a flagpole sitter is the first guest on the July 3, 1955, episode.
- Pole sitting is worked into the plot of the season 5 episode of M*A*S*H entitled "Souvenirs". For his latest scheme to get a section 8 discharge, Corporal Klinger climbs a pole in the middle of camp and refuses to come down until he is granted his discharge. When Colonel Potter learns that the Army record for pole sitting is 96 hours, he turns the tables by convincing Klinger to stay up there to break the record.
- One episode of The Muppet Show features a "Muppet News Flash" segment that covers the story of Melvin Cosgrove, who, having climbed up a 30 feet (9.1 m) pole and scrambled onto a 6 by 6 foot (1.8 m × 1.8 m) platform, aimed to achieve the world record for flagpole sitting. After sixteen years, his wife had gone up to his pole and found that he had passed away during this feat.

== Film ==
In a dialog sequence early in the 1932 movie The Most Dangerous Game, the character Zaroff introduces the protagonist Bob to his guests as a celebrity, upon which Martin guesses (incorrectly) that Bob might be a flagpole sitter.

In 2004, Danish film Tid Til Forandring / What's Wrong With This Picture the pole-sitting competition is prominently featured as a part of the film with the main character Inge winning the contest by abandoning the sitting as the sole remaining participant when a dog resembling her own passes by.

== See also ==
- Tree sitting
- Stylites
- Planking (fad)
- Phonebooth stuffing
