= George O. Gore II =

American actor (born 1982)

- Born: December 15, 1982 (age 43); Fort Washington, Maryland, U.S.
- Occupations: Actor; Director; Writer; Comedian
- Years active: 1991–present

George Owen Gore II (born December 15, 1982) is an American actor and comedian. He is best known for portraying Gregory "G" Williams on the FOX series New York Undercover from 1994 to 1998 and Michael Kyle, Jr. on the ABC sitcom My Wife and Kids from 2001 to 2005. He was also one of the main characters in the cast of the comedy Second Generation Wayans. Throughout his career, Gore has received four NAACP Image Award nominations.

== Career ==
Gore made his acting debut at age 9 in 1992, appearing as Brian in Juice. His first major role was Gregory "G" Williams, the son of Malik Yoba's character, on crime drama New York Undercover, appearing on the series from 1994 to 1998. Gore received several accolades for his work on New York Undercover, all nominations: three NAACP Image Awards, one Young Artist Award (1997), and a YoungStar Award (1998). He had a small role in horror film The Devil's Advocate (1997). While continuing his acting career as a teenager, Gore was a student at Suitland High School.

In 2001, he was cast as Michael Kyle, Jr. (who went by Jr.) on sitcom My Wife and Kids. Gore claimed that he had to adjust to the comedic setting of the series, having mostly acted in more dramatic works up to that point. For his work on this series, he was nominated in 2004 for the NAACP Image Award for Outstanding Supporting Actor in a Comedy Series. It marked his fourth NAACP Image Award nomination overall. Additionally, Gore earned his second Young Artist Award nomination in 2003. Gore continued playing the role until the series ended in 2005.

His other television credits include guest roles on Law & Order and Touched by an Angel. Gore appeared in the 2009 film Dance Flick, and played a fictionalized version of himself in Second Generation Wayans.

Behind the scenes, Gore directed one episode of My Wife and Kids ("Outbreak Monkey"), wherein LeBron James makes a guest appearance. He co-wrote the screenplay for Sneakerella (2022), a modern adaptation of fairy tale Cinderella.

== Filmography ==
=== Film ===
Year	Title	Role	Notes
1992	Juice	Brian	Credited as George O. Gore
1996	Eddie	Mark Jones	
1997	The Devil's Advocate	Boy in Harlem	
1999	The Bumblebee Flies Anyway	Billy	
2006	Thugaboo: Sneaker Madness	Voice of D-Roc	television movie
2006	Thugaboo: A Miracle on D-Roc's Street	D-Roc	Television movie
2009	Dance Flick	Ray	

=== Television ===
Year	Title	Role	Notes
1994–1998	New York Undercover	Gregory "G" Williams	41 episodes
1996	Law & Order	Clayton Doyle	Episode: "Slave"
1998	Touched by an Angel	Tyler	Episode: "Elijah"
2001	The Nightmare Room	Frederick Goal	2 episodes
2001–2005	My Wife and Kids	Michael Kyle Jr.	Main role
2006	The Boo Crew	D-Roc	voice
2013	Second Generation Wayans	Himself	10 episodes

=== Director ===
Year	Title	Role	Notes
2004	My Wife and Kids	Director	Episodes: "Outbreak Monkey" and "Michael Joins a Gym"
