= First Pan Pacific Conference on Education, Rehabilitation, Reclamation and Recreation =

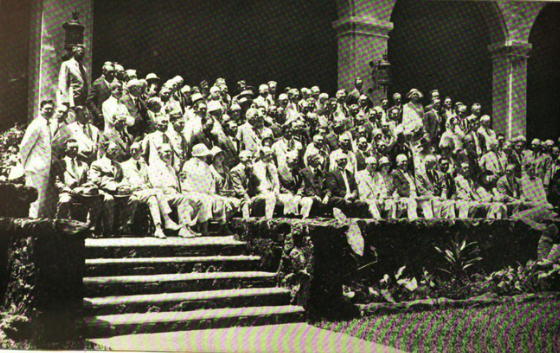
- Full delegation to the conference
- Genre: Conference
- Dates: April 11 to 16, 1927
- Venue: Royal Hawaiian Hotel (headquarters)
- Locations: Honolulu, Territory of Hawaii
- Participants: 53 official delegates; 171 appointive members

The First Pan Pacific Conference on Education, Rehabilitation, Reclamation and Recreation was held in Honolulu, Territory of Hawaii from April 11 to 16, 1927. Convened by President Calvin Coolidge, it was the first official conference held in Honolulu called by the head of a Pacific government. The conference was designed for the consideration of problems relating to Education, Rehabilitation, Reclamation and Recreation. Invited delegates hailed from all countries bordering on the Pacific Ocean. It was the first time that Hawaii held a conference of this size. Conference headquarters were at the Royal Hawaiian Hotel.

== Development ==
Two unofficial but pioneer Pan-Pacific Educational Conferences were called in Honolulu in 1921 by the Pan-Pacific Union and in San Francisco in 1923. Governor Wallace R. Farrington of Hawaii had been anxious for a number of years to have President Coolidge and officials of the United States Department of the Interior visit Hawaii, so that they might have first-hand information regarding its problems. In response to an invitation to visit Hawaii, President Coolidge suggested that although he himself could not come, it might be advisable for all departments interested in Hawaii to send representatives who might meet together and discuss common problems. From this group of officials, the plans were gradually extended to include similar officials from other countries in the Pacific area.

== Plan ==
President Coolidge, an honorary head of the Pan-Pacific Union, issued an official call for the Pan-Pacific Conference on Education, Rehabilitation, Reclamation and Recreation to meet in Honolulu in April 1927. In Honolulu, the U.S. Secretary of the Interior, Dr. Hubert Work, was the presiding officer, and Governor Farrington the host. Entirely, the conference was under the direction and authority of the U.S. Department of the Interior. Dr. John J. Tigert, Commissioner of Education, directed the Educational Section of the conference, calling on the official delegates from the several Pacific lands to preside over the several sessions. Dr. Elwood Mead, chief of the U. S. Reclamation Service (now United States Bureau of Reclamation), headed that section, and Mr. Stephen Mather, director of the National Park Service, directed the section of the conference on recreation. The part the Pan-Pacific Union took in the conference was to call a meeting of the trustees and ask the president of the Union, Governor Farrington, to appoint a civic entertainment committee which assumed the responsibility of the entertainment program of the delegates. The U.S. Congress officially recognized this meeting by appropriating US$15,000. The Hawaii Territorial Legislature considered the matter of appropriating an additional US$15,000 to cover local expenses, entertainment, and so forth.

The conference had a double purpose. It was called, first, so that officials of the U.S. and Pacific countries could have an opportunity to visit and study at first hand the development and problems of Hawaii. In the second place, the conference would provide for an exchange of ideas and suggestions from peoples of many different countries. The educators were interested principally in that phase of the conference which dealt with Education. In this phase, they were interested, first, in giving the visitors a picture of Hawaii's school progress and problems and, secondly, in learning what progress has been made, and how problems were solved in the schools of other countries.

== Convening ==
The conference convened on April 11, and closed on April 16, 1927. The official language was English. The U.S. secretary of the interior was general chairman, having full authority for the inauguration and conduct of the conference, and presided at the opening and closing formal sessions. The conference was divided into three sections: education, reclamation, and recreation. Each section held seven meetings of 3 to 3.5 hours each and in these group gatherings, where more or less informal roundtable discussions were carried on, most of the work of the conference was done. The chairmen of the sections were the commissioner of education, the commissioner of reclamation, and the director of the National Park Service, respectively, of the U.S. Department of the Interior, but other official delegates were called upon to conduct many of the section meetings.

== Representation and membership ==
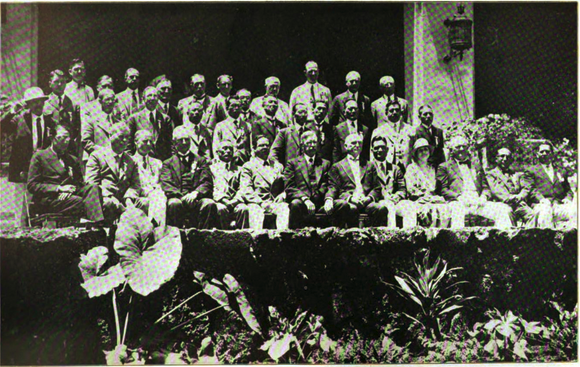
Official delegates sent by the Pacific governments

There were three groupings of people in attendance at the conference.

1. Officials from the United States and Pacific countries, who were sent by their respective countries by virtue of their positions.
2. Appointed delegates who were invited by the U.S. to represent certain groups, such as schools, universities, and societies
3. Interested visitors, both local and from elsewhere, who were interested in specific problems under discussion.

A few people belonged to the first two groups, but most of the attendees were in the third group. None of the meetings were secret, but some of them were limited by the size of the meeting rooms.

The total membership of the conference numbered 53 official delegates from Governments officially participating and 171 appointive members representing institutions, organizations and societies, or persons having a special interest in the deliberations. Twelve foreign countries were represented, as follows: Australia, Chile, Colombia, Fiji Islands and western Pacific, France, Great Britain, Japan, Mexico, New Zealand, Nicaragua, Peru. Delegates from the Government of the United States included representatives from: Department of the Interior, Department of Agriculture, Treasury Department, Federal Board for Vocational Education, and Civil Service Commission. Official representation of the States, Territories, and outlying parts of the U.S. came from Massachusetts, Hawaii, American Samoa, Mississippi, New Mexico, and Utah. Universities in China, Japan, and the United States participated by sending delegates or choosing alumni resident in or near Honolulu as their representatives. Fifty-six associations directly or indirectly engaged in some of the activities under discussion selected members to attend the conference. Twenty-one persons were appointed delegates at large.

== Agenda ==
The subjects to which the conference confined its deliberations were set out in preliminary agenda approved by the U.S. Department of State and thought to be of paramount interest to the peoples of the countries participating. They were:

=== Education ===
1. Exchange of educational ideas through:
  - Establishment and maintenance of centers for the exchange and distribution of adequate translations of laws, decrees, texts, publications, etc.
  - Exchange of lecturers, teachers, students, research workers, and others interested or actively engaged in education .
  - The formulation of principles and standards for credential acceptance and evaluation .
2. Establishment and preservation of national standards for child life through proper care of the mother and the infant.
  - Furnishing a certain minimum number of years of instruction and requiring the child's attendance .
  - Instruction in health habits and provision of proper recreation .
3. Vocational education :
  - The place of vocational education in the general educational program .
  - Government plans for stimulation of vocational education .
  - The rehabilitation of civilians disabled in industry .

=== Reclamation ===
1. Efforts of the State to aid homesteaders and build up commun-ties of small farm owners .
2. The relation of marketing agencies to the successful settlement of public lands .
3. The relationship of the State to planting contracts and the homesteader's dealings with the mill or cannery at which his product is handled .
4. Methods for extending public credit to homestead development enterprises .
5. Laws for the regulation and use of streams in irrigation .
6. Engineering problems connected with storage and distribution of water .

=== Recreation ===
1. The vital relation of outdoor recreation to the health, physical, mental, and spiritual, of the Nation .
2. The important part that national parks play in the outdoor recreational field .
3. The place of national parks in an educational program as natural museums wherein the flora and fauna native to the region may be studied, rock forms examined, and the results of volcanism, glacial action, and erosion observed .
4. The protection and preservation of indigenous plants and animals .
5. Administration and management of parks .
6. Correlation of Government and private efforts along conservative lines, including establishment of State and municipal parks .

== Exhibits ==
Educational and welfare activities in Mexico were illustrated and described in many sets of books brought to the conference for display and distribution . Pamphlets outlining the educational facilities of Japan were available for the delegates. Vocational education in most of its aspects was emphasized in a display of materials, graphs, and publications furnished by the Department of Education of Hawaii and the Federal Board for Vocational Education. The results of various research studies made in the fields of infant and maternal welfare and suggestions as to the proper care of children were contributed by the Children's Bureau of the Department of Labor. Group organizations and outdoor activities for young people were portrayed in a series of pictures and publications from the Girl Scouts of the United States. A display of designs in color as examples of the conscious application of art principles to the study of originality in design was sent by the first-year students in the art department of Fisk University, Nashville, Tennessee.

Recreation and the care and preservation of areas of natural scenic beauty and scientific value through the establishment of national parks and monuments were demonstrated by a number of models, pictures, and collections of data assembled and arranged by the National Park Service. Various reclamation projects throughout the world, and their areas and production, were graphically shown in colored photographs and tables of information. Education in the United States, in most of its phases, such as State, county and city school administration, rural school problems and their solution, education of native Alaskans, and the work of the Bureau of Education, was presented through a series of 123 charts, graphs, and photographs.
