= My Wife and Kids =

American television sitcom

- Genre: Sitcom
- Created by: Don Reo; Damon Wayans
- Starring: Damon Wayans; Tisha Campbell-Martin; George O. Gore II; Jazz Raycole; Parker McKenna Posey; Jennifer Nicole Freeman; Noah Gray-Cabey; Andrew McFarlane; Brooklyn Sudano
- Music by: Derryck "Big Tank" Thornton (seasons 1–3); Dwayne Wayans (seasons 4–5)
- Country of origin: United States
- Original language: English
- No. of seasons: 5
- No. of episodes: 123 (list of episodes)

Production
- Executive producers: Don Reo; Damon Wayans; David Himelfarb (seasons 1–4); Andy Cadiff (season 3); Dean Lorey (seasons 4–5)
- Production locations: Walt Disney Studios, Burbank, California
- Camera setup: Multi-camera
- Running time: 30 minutes
- Production companies: Wayans Bros. Entertainment; Impact Zone Productions; Touchstone Television

Original release
- Network: ABC
- Release: March 28, 2001 – May 17, 2005

My Wife and Kids is an American television sitcom that aired on ABC from March 28, 2001, to May 17, 2005, with a total of 123 half-hour episodes spanning five seasons. The series, produced by Touchstone Television in association with Wayans Bros. Entertainment and Impact Zone, stars Damon Wayans (also creator alongside veteran television writer/producer Don Reo) as Michael Kyle, the patriarch of a family in Stamford, Connecticut.

== Premise ==
The show, set in Stamford, Connecticut, follows a wealthy African American family, led by patriarch Michael Kyle Sr., who owns and operates his own trucking company. Michael thinks he commands his family, but his wife Janet, simple-minded son Michael Jr., and broody daughters: self-centered Claire and his favorite youngest Kady, remind him every day that his dream is just a dream.

== Episodes ==
Season	Episodes	Originally released	
Season	Episodes	First released	Last released
1	11	March 28, 2001	May 9, 2001
2	29	September 26, 2001	May 22, 2002
3	27	September 25, 2002	May 21, 2003
4	30	September 24, 2003	May 26, 2004
5	26	September 21, 2004	May 17, 2005

== Cast ==
=== Main ===
Actor	Character	Duration	Episodes
Damon Wayans	Michael Richard Kyle Sr.	2001–2005	123
Tisha Campbell-Martin	Janet Marie "Jay" Kyle	2001–2005	120
George O. Gore II	Michael Richard Kyle Jr.	2001–2005	122
Jazz Raycole	Claire Kyle	2001	12
Jennifer Nicole Freeman	Claire Kyle	2001–2005	109
Parker McKenna Posey	Kady Kyle	2001–2005	121
Meagan Good	Vanessa Scott-Kyle	2003	5
Brooklyn Sudano	Vanessa Scott-Kyle	2003–2005	28
Noah Gray-Cabey	Franklin Aloysius Mumford III	2002–2005	58
Andrew McFarlane	Roger	2001	1
Andrew McFarlane	Tony Jeffers	2001–2005	27

=== Recurring ===
- Phil Reeves as Dr. William Parks Klieger (seasons 1–2, 4)
- RuDee Sade as Erica Washington (seasons 1–2)
- Cara Mia Wayans as Shante Bre (seasons 1–2)
- Steve Harvey as Steve (guest star; episode “Jay the Artist”)
- Damon Wayans Jr. as John (seasons 2–4)
- Liliana Mumy as Rachel McNamara (seasons 3–4)
- Jessica Sara as Melissa (seasons 2–5)
- DeRay Davis as R.J. (seasons 2–4)
- Brian Holtzman as Brian (seasons 3–4)
- Todd Lynn as Todd (seasons 3–4)
- Ella Joyce as Jasmine Scott (seasons 4–5)
- Lester Speight as Calvin Scott (seasons 4–5)
- Sean Whalen as Larry (season 4)
- Katt Williams as Bobby Shaw (season 5)

== Home media ==
Lionsgate Home Entertainment has released the first two seasons of My Wife and Kids on DVD in Region 1. The entire series is also available for streaming on Hulu. In May 2026, the entire series was added to the free streaming service Pluto TV.

DVD name	Ep #	Release date
Season 1	11	February 24, 2009
Season 2	29	May 11, 2010

== Reception ==
=== Season ratings ===
Season	TV Season	Ratings Rank	Viewers (in millions)
1	2000–2001	#23	8.0
2	2001–2002	#41	11.0
3	2002–2003	#22	11.3
4	2003–2004	#59	10.0
5	2004–2005	#79	7.2

=== Accolades ===
Association	Year	Category	Nominee(s)	Result	Ref
ASCAP Film and Television Music Awards	2003	Top TV Series	Derryck Big Tank Thorton	Won	
BET Comedy Awards	2004	Outstanding Comedy Series	My Wife and Kids	Nominated	
BET Comedy Awards	2004	Outstanding Directing for a Comedy Series	Guy Distad; Peter Filsinger; George Gore II; Eric Laneuville; Dean Lorey; Ron Moseley; James Valleley; Craig Wayans; Damien Wayans; Kim Wayans	Nominated	
BET Comedy Awards	2004	Outstanding Writing for a Comedy Series	Rodney Barnes; Aeysha Carr; Kevin Knotts; Dean Lorey; Shane Miller; Kerry Parker; Valencia Parker; Don Reo; Kevin Rooney; James Vallely; Craig Wayans; Damien Wayans; Damon Wayans Jr. Elvira Wayans; Kim Wayans	Nominated	
BET Comedy Awards	2004	Outstanding Lead Actor in a Comedy Series	Damon Wayans	Won	
BET Comedy Awards	2004	Outstanding Lead Actress in a Comedy Series	Tisha Campbell-Martin	Won	
BET Comedy Awards	2004	Outstanding Supporting Actor in a Comedy Series	George Gore II	Nominated	
BET Comedy Awards	2005	Outstanding Comedy Series	My Wife and Kids	Nominated	
BET Comedy Awards	2005	Outstanding Directing for a Comedy Series	Tisha Campbell-Martin; Mattie Carruthers; Guy Distad; Peter Filsinger; Randy Fletcher; Vito Giambalvo; George Gore II; Dean Lorey; Ron Moseley; Craig Wayans; Damien Wayans; Kim Wayans; James D. Wilcox	Nominated	
BET Comedy Awards	2005	Outstanding Writing for a Comedy Series	Rodney Barnes; Aeysha Carr; Lisa D. Hall; Kevin Knotts; Dean Lorey; Don Reo; Kevin Rooney; Kerry Parker; Valencia Parker; Craig Wayans; Damien Wayans; Elvira Wayans; Kim Wayans; Ron Zimmerman	Nominated	
BET Comedy Awards	2005	Outstanding Lead Actor in a Comedy Series	Damon Wayans	Nominated	
BET Comedy Awards	2005	Outstanding Lead Actress in a Comedy Series	Tisha Campbell-Martin	Nominated	
Environmental Media Awards	2004	Primetime Television for episode ("He's Having a Baby")	Damon Wayans (directed by); Aeysha Carr (written by)	Won	
Family Television Award	2002	Comedy	My Wife and Kids	Won	
Image Awards (NAACP)	2002	Outstanding Comedy Series	My Wife and Kids	Nominated	
Image Awards (NAACP)	2002	Outstanding Actor in a Comedy Series	Damon Wayans	Nominated	
Image Awards (NAACP)	2002	Outstanding Actress in a Comedy Series	Tisha Campbell-Martin	Nominated	
Image Awards (NAACP)	2003	Outstanding Comedy Series	My Wife and Kids	Nominated	
Image Awards (NAACP)	2003	Outstanding Actor in a Comedy Series	Damon Wayans	Nominated	
Image Awards (NAACP)	2003	Outstanding Actress in a Comedy Series	Tisha Campbell-Martin	Won	
Image Awards (NAACP)	2004	Outstanding Comedy Series	My Wife and Kids	Nominated	
Image Awards (NAACP)	2004	Outstanding Actor in a Comedy Series	Damon Wayans	Nominated	
Image Awards (NAACP)	2004	Outstanding Actress in a Comedy Series	Tisha Campbell-Martin	Nominated	
Image Awards (NAACP)	2004	Outstanding Supporting Actor in a Comedy Series	George Gore II	Nominated	
Image Awards (NAACP)	2005	Outstanding Comedy Series	My Wife and Kids	Nominated	
Image Awards (NAACP)	2005	Outstanding Actor in a Comedy Series	Damon Wayans	Nominated	
Image Awards (NAACP)	2005	Outstanding Actress in a Comedy Series	Tisha Campbell-Martin	Nominated	
Image Awards (NAACP)	2006	Outstanding Directing in a Comedy Series	Mattie Caruthers	Nominated	
Image Awards (NAACP)	2006	Outstanding Directing in a Comedy Series	James D. Wilcox	Nominated	
Logie Awards	2004	Most Popular Overseas Comedy	My Wife and Kids	Nominated	
People's Choice Awards	2002	Favorite New Television Comedy Series	My Wife and Kids	Won	
People's Choice Awards	2002	Favorite Male Performer in a New Television Series	Damon Wayans	Won	
Prism Awards	2002	TV Comedy Series Episode for episode ("Grassy Knolls")	Ted Wass (directed by); Adam Hamburger (written by)	Won	
Satellite Awards	2003	Best Actor in a Series, Comedy or Musical	Damon Wayans	Nominated	
Satellite Awards	2005	Best Actor in a Series, Comedy or Musical	Damon Wayans	Nominated	
Teen Choice Awards	2001	Choice TV Series: Comedy	My Wife and Kids	Nominated	
Teen Choice Awards	2004	Choice TV Actress: Comedy	Jennifer Freeman	Nominated	
Young Artist Awards	2002	Best Performance in a Television Series (Comedy or Drama) — Young Actress Age Ten or Under	Parker McKenna Posey	Nominated	
Young Artist Awards	2003	Best Family Television Series (Comedy or Drama)	My Wife and Kids	Nominated	
Young Artist Awards	2003	Best Performance in a Television Comedy or Drama Series — Guest Starring Young Actress Age Ten or Under	Jessica Sara	Won	
Young Artist Awards	2003	Best Performance in a Television Comedy or Drama Series — Guest Starring Young Actress Age Ten or Under	Liliana Mumy	Nominated	
Young Artist Awards	2003	Best Performance in a Television Comedy Series — Guest Starring Young Actress	Marina Malota Darling	Nominated	
Young Artist Awards	2003	Best Ensemble in a Television Series (Comedy or Drama)	Parker McKenna Posey; Jennifer Freeman; George Gore II	Nominated	
Young Artist Awards	2004	Best Performance in a Television Series Comedy or Drama Series — Guest Starring Young Actress Age Ten or Younger	Noah Gray-Cabey	Nominated	
Young Artist Awards	2005	Best Performance in a Television Series (Comedy or Drama) — Young Actor Age Ten or Younger	Noah Gray-Cabey	Nominated	
Young Artist Awards	2006	Best Performance in a Television Series (Comedy or Drama) — Young Actor Age Ten or Younger	Noah Gray-Cabey	Won	
Young Artist Awards	2006	Best Performance in a Television Series (Comedy or Drama) — Young Actress Age Ten or Younger	Jazz Raycole	Nominated	
