= Leonard Withington =

American writer

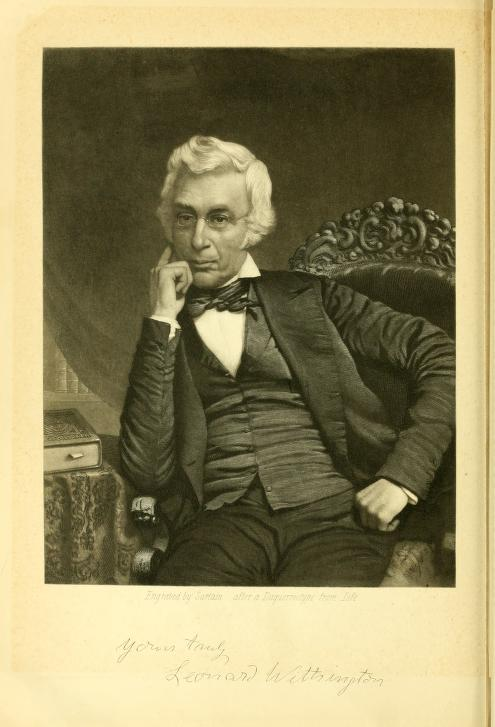
- Born: August 9, 1789; Dorchester
- Died: April 22, 1885 (aged 95); Newbury
- Alma mater: Yale University; Andover Newton Theological School

Leonard Withington (August 9, 1789 – April 22, 1885) was an American Congregationalist minister and author; he is credited with writing the hymn, “O Savior of a world undone”.

Withington, son of Joseph W. and Elizabeth (White) Withington, was born in Dorchester, Mass., August 9, 1789, and died in Newbury, Mass., April 22, 1885, in his 96th year, being the last survivor of the Yale College Class of 1814, and older than any other surviving graduate at the time of his death, as well as the oldest Congregational clergyman in the country.

After serving an apprenticeship as a printer, Withington entered Phillips Academy, Andover in 1809, graduating in 1811. Having thus acquired an ambition for a literary life, he matriculated at Yale as a sophomore. While in college he decided to enter the ministry, and accordingly upon graduation in 1814 pursued such studies with President Timothy Dwight and with his own pastor, the Rev. Dr. Codman, and also for a few months at Andover Theological Seminary. On October 31, 1816, he was ordained as pastor of the First church in Newbury, Mass., and there spent his long life. After forty-two years of active service, while his powers were still in full vigor, he retired on the anniversary of his ordination, with the title of senior pastor, and his declining years were passed in calm happiness in the midst of his grateful people.

He was a man of original thought and vigorous expression, and of extensive and accurate learning. No one could meet him, even casually, without admiration of his unusual gifts. He published in 1836, anonymously, two volumes of essays, entitled The Puritan (sextodecimo, pp. 248, 268); and also, in 1861, Solomon's Song, translated and explained (duodecimo, pp. 329), besides numerous sermons, addresses, and lectures.

Bowdoin College gave him in 1850 the degree of Doctor of Divinity.

He married, January 17, 1817, Sophia, daughter of William Sherburne, Esq., of Boston, who died April 1, 1826. On May 28, 1827, he married Caroline, daughter of the Hon. Nathan Noyes, M.D., of Newburyport, who died August 5, 1860. By his first wife he had three sons, who predeceased him, and by his second wife five sons and four daughters, of whom two sons and the daughters survived him.
