= Here with Me =

Here with Me may refer to:

- Here with Me (album), a 2009 album by Holly Williams
- "Here with Me" (Philip Bailey song), 1994
- "Here with Me" (Dido song), 1999
- "Here with Me" (MercyMe song), 2004
- "Here with Me" (Arika Kane song), 2010
- "Here with Me" (The Killers song), 2012
- "Here with Me" (Marshmello song), 2019
- "Here with Me" (D4vd song), 2023
- "Here with Me", a song by REO Speedwagon from the album The Hits, 1988
- "Here with Me", a song by Plumb from the album candycoatedwaterdrops, 1999
- "Here with Me", a song by Michelle Branch from the album The Spirit Room, 2001
- "Here with Me", also called "Here with Me/Intencity", a track by ATB from the album No Silence, 2004
