= Arika Kane =

American singer-songwriter

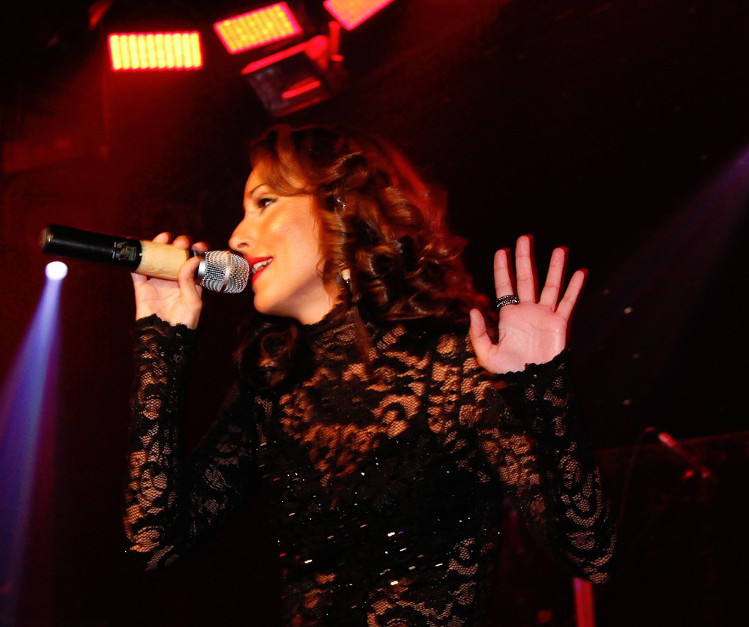
- Arika Kane performing at B.B. King in NYC, 2013

Background information
- Born: Killingly, Connecticut, U.S.
- Genres: Soul, pop, R&B
- Occupations: Singer, songwriter, producer
- Instruments: vocals, piano, keyboards, guitar
- Years active: 2009–present
- Label: BSE Recordings
- Website: www.arikakane.com

Arika Kane is an American recording artist, songwriter, and producer born into a musical family.

In 2009 she signed with BSE Recordings and released her self-titled debut album the following year. The third single "Here With Me" reached No. 69 on Billboard Hot 100, becoming her first platinum-selling single. Arika Kane's second studio album, Substance, was released in 2012, which produced the hit singles "Waiting" and "Fight 4 Ur Life."

Throughout her career Kane's music has been placed on several VH1 and MTV television shows, including Love & Hip Hop (NY), Basketball Wives and Single Ladies, among others. VH1 chose "Make It," a song from her debut album, as the theme song for Hollywood Exes and Atlanta Exes.

She released the single "It's There" (featuring Brian McKnight) on March 18, 2014. The single will also be included on her third studio album Thru the Veil.

== Life and career ==
=== 2009–2012: Arika Kane ===
Arika Kane's self-titled debut album was released on February 23, 2010. The album set digital sales records and spawned three singles: "Bcuz I Luv U," "4 the Lovers" and "Here With Me." The lead single "Bcuz I Luv U" peaked at number thirty-nine on the US Billboard Hot Adult R&B Airplay chart. The sophomore single, "4 the Lovers" charted at number seven on the Single Sales chart, number nineteen on the R&B Airplay chart and at number eighty on Billboard Hot 100. "Here With Me," the third single, also charted at number four on the Single Sales chart, number fourteen on the R&B Airplay and number sixty-seven on the Hot 100. The song was placed as a feature on the first season of VH1's Love & Hip Hop.

Kane was the only female artist to appear alongside Kenneth "Babyface" Edmonds, Charlie Wilson and Maze featuring Frankie Beverly at the DeSoto Civic Center in Augusta, GA, in 2009.

Throughout 2010, VH1 and MTV placed six songs from Kane's debut album on "Love and Hip Hop," “What Chilli Wants," “Single Ladies," “Disaster Date" and "Basketball Wives.”

In 2010, the UAC Mediabase charts named Arika Kane and BSE Recordings the No. 1 Independent Artist and Label in the country for 20 weeks straight.

In late 2011, Kane began recording her second album, "Substance."

=== 2012–2014: Substance ===
Digitally released on April 13, 2012, "Substance" peaked at number seven on digital charts. Several songs from the album were placed on VH1's Single Ladies 2.

In June 2012, VH1 selected "Make It," a song from her debut album, as the theme song for "Hollywood Exes. " Kane released the "Make It" remix in July 2012.

=== 2014–present: "It's There" ===
Kane released the single "It's There (featuring Brian McKnight) on March 18, 2014. "It's There" is the first release from Kane's forthcoming album, "Thru the Veil."

== Personal life ==
Kane is a women's rights advocate. As a songwriter, her music focuses on empowering and inspiring women.

== Discography ==
Studio albums

- Arika Kane (2010)
- Substance (2012)
- Thru the Veil (2014)

Singles

Year	Song	Chart positions	Album
Year	Song	US R&B	Album
2010	"Here With Me"	69	Arika Kane
2010	4 the Lovers	90	Arika Kane
