= Kevin Barnett =

Kevin Barnett may refer to:

- Kevin Barnett (volleyball)
- Kevin Barnett (comedian)
