= Christina Cooper =

American model and film director(born 1994)

- Born: 1994 (age 31–32); Los Angeles, California
- Occupations: Actress; producer; director; author; model; philanthropist
- Years active: 2012–present
- Notable work: Dear White People; Never Heard; South Central Love

Christina Cooper born in (1994) is an American model, actress, film director, screenwriter, producer and philanthropist. She is known for writing, directing, producing and starring in the drama film South Central Love (2019). She began her acting career with an appearance as Miko in the Netflix comedy-drama series ''Dear White People'' and later moved into filmmaking. Her other credits include ''Loyalty'' (2018), Bid for Love (2022), The Influencer (2024) and Sugar Baby (2025).

== Early life ==
Christina Coope was born on 1994 in Los Angeles, California, to May Cooper, who is of Chinese descent, and Ashton Cooper, who is Jamaican. She grew up in Los Angeles and also spent time visiting relatives in Jamaica. Her exposure to both places later influenced aspects of her work in film and fashion. During her visits to Jamaica, Cooper became familiar with local clothing styles and fabrics. She has cited Jamaican culture, food and the island's landscape as influences on her creative interests. Cooper has also credited Naomi Campbell as an early influence on her love of fashion and modelling.

== Career ==
Cooper began her modelling career after being scouted at Fox Hills Mall in Culver City, California. She was offered a contract by a New York modelling agency and took part in New York Fashion Week. She later signed with a Germany-based agency, which led to appearances at Mercedes-Benz Berlin Fashion Week and Milan Fashion Week. She later established the Island Gal Collection, a Caribbean-influenced fashion and beauty brand. The business expanded from clothing into skincare and vegan beauty products. She has stated that her own experience with sensitive skin contributed to her decision to develop skincare products.

Cooper began her acting career with background acting and received her first credited television role as Miko in the Netflix series Dear White People in 2017. She subsequently appeared in film and television productions, including Never Heard. She has stated that the work of filmmaker John Singleton and the development of independent content by Issa Rae influenced her decision to write and direct her own projects.

Her work as a filmmaker has drawn references from her upbringing in Los Angeles. In 2018, Cooper established Christina Cooper Productions. One of the company's first projects was the short film Loyalty, which Cooper wrote, co-directed and executive produced. She also appeared in the film as Bria.

She directed South Central Love, a film influenced by her experiences in the city and centred on the effects of gun violence. The film was later broadcast on BET and released on BET+. She starred in the film, playing Bria alongside Jamal Henderson. Set in South Central Los Angeles. Cooper also became involved in entrepreneurship and online business education. Through CCPLA University, she developed online courses focused on establishing e-commerce businesses. Her work across film, fashion and business has often incorporated influences from her Jamaican heritage and her experiences in Los Angeles.

In 2020, Cooper joined the production of Mann Robinson's Super Turnt as a producer. The film is a sequel to Turnt and stars Jamal Woolard, Torrei Hart, Harry Lennix and E. Roger Mitchell. That same year she worked on the development of Rising 6, a superhero project for which she served as creator, director, writer and producer. The project follows six individuals who develop supernatural abilities after participating in an experimental government programme.

In 2022, Cooper served as a producer on the romantic drama film Bid for Love. In 2023, she directed the romantic drama The Perfect Love Storm, an adaptation of Anna Black's novel of the same name. The film was written by Briana Cole and featured Leslie Black and Norman Towns in the lead roles. Cooper also appeared in the film as part of an ensemble cast that included Nzinga Imani, Cocoa Brown, Chrystale Wilson and Clifton Powell.

She later appeared in The Influencer (2024) and played Jade in Sugar Baby (2025). Cooper has been named a Forbes 30 Under 30 nominee.

== Filmography ==
Key
†	Denotes films that have not yet been released

=== Film work ===
Year	Title	Credited as			
Year	Title	Director	Writer	Producer	Actor
2012	Garifuna in Peril	No	No	No	Yes
2015	Calix: Bad Blood	No	No	No	Yes
2015	Lipstick the Series	No	No	No	Yes
2017	Dear White People	No	No	No	Yes
2017	Model Diaries	No	No	No	Yes
2017	Westside FX: War	No	No	No	Yes
2018	Be Woke	No	No	No	Yes
2018	Blue Laces	No	No	No	Yes
2018	Chasing Happiness	No	No	No	Yes
2018	Fight the Force	No	No	No	Yes
2018	Loyalty	No	No	No	Yes
2018	Never Heard	No	No	No	Yes
2018	PopFuzion TV	No	No	No	Yes
2018	The Christina Cooper Show	No	No	No	Yes
2019	Become Inspired	No	No	No	Yes
2019	South Central Love	Yes	Yes	Yes	Yes
2019	The Lovers Lyfe	No	No	No	Yes
2020	Cracka	No	No	No	Yes
2020	The Price of Fame	No	No	No	Yes
2022	$ix Figure Makeover	No	No	No	Yes
2022	Bid for Love	No	No	Yes	No
2022	Super Turnt	No	No	No	Yes
2024	The Influencer	No	No	No	Yes
2025	Omaha	No	No	No	Yes
2025	Sugar Baby	No	No	No	Yes

== Bibliography ==
- Modeling: From LA to Milan: How to book your big campaign
- Who'snext Magazine

== Fragrances ==
=== Christina Cooper line ===
- Island Gal (2020)
