= The Mattachine Family =

2023 American drama film

- Directed by: Andy Vallentine
- Written by: Danny Vallentine
- Produced by: Scot Boland; Michael Diaz; Siddharth Ganji; Stuart Heinlein; Cameron Hutchison; Andy Vallentine
- Starring: Nico Tortorella; Juan Pablo Di Pace; Emily Hampshire; Carl Clemons-Hopkins; Heather Matarazzo; Cloie Wyatt Taylor; Jake Choi
- Cinematography: Julia Swain
- Edited by: Jonathan Melin
- Music by: Lauren Culjak
- Production company: Huckleberry Films
- Distributed by: Giant Pictures; Peccadillo Pictures; Salzgeber; Optimale; GagaOOLala
- Release dates: May 2023 (Seattle International Film Festival); June 4, 2024 (Amazon Prime Video)
- Running time: 99 minutes
- Country: United States
- Language: English

The Mattachine Family is an American comedy-drama film directed by Andy Vallentine and released in 2023. The film stars Nico Tortorella and Juan Pablo Di Pace as Thomas and Oscar, a gay couple who have spent a year as foster parent to a six-year-old boy whose mother was in jail; however, when she is released and regains custody of her son, Thomas and Oscar are forced to confront their very different visions for what they want out of life when they find themselves in disagreement on whether to pursue true parenthood.

The cast also includes Emily Hampshire as Leah, Thomas's friend who is also grappling with queer parenthood as she has recently suffered a miscarriage, as well as Heather Matarazzo, Cloie Wyatt Taylor, Jake Choi, Garrett Clayton, Carl Clemons-Hopkins, Travis DuBridge, Colleen Foy, Jude Friedman, Annie Funke, Khalilah Joi and Jeanine Harrington in supporting roles.

== Plot ==
The photographer, Thomas, captured his life story with photos. He realized he was gay when he saw a cartoon with muscular men. Thomas tells the story of Oscar, a famous child star on a popular sitcom whose acting career ended with a tabloid story that outed him. Eventually, Thomas would marry Oscar.

Thomas and Oscar are very much in love and live in their shared apartment in Los Angeles. When they have to return their first foster child, Arthur, to his birth mother, who has been released from prison after a year, they ask themselves how to proceed with their family planning and realize that they have different ideas about it after this experience. However, they have their chosen family consisting of friends who face their challenges in building a family. While Thomas' lesbian friend Leah and her wife Sonia are still waiting to get pregnant, their friend Annie is raising a child with her gay best friend Todd.

== Cast ==
- Nico Tortorella as Thomas Reid
- Juan Pablo Di Pace as Oscar
- Emily Hampshire as Leah
- Carl Clemons-Hopkins as Todd
- Heather Matarazzo as Annie
- Cloie Wyatt Taylor as Sonia
- Jake Choi as Jamie

== Production ==
It was directed by video and commercial film director Andy Vallentine. The film's screenplay was written by Danny Vallentine, the director's husband, and is based partly on their real-life relationship. It went into production in fall 2021. Andy Vallentine has previously made several short films, most recently The Letter Men, which he presented at the Tribeca Film Festival in June 2022 and based on a series of love letters from a gay couple during World War II.The Mattachine Family is his feature film debut. Zach Braff was an executive producer of the film.

Nico Tortorella and Argentinian Juan Pablo Di Pace play Thomas and Oscar. Carl Clemons-Hopkins was cast as Todd, and the Canadian Emily Hampshire as Thomas' lesbian friend Leah. Cloie Wyatt Taylor plays Leah's wife, Sonia. Heather Matarazzo appears in a cameo as Annie. Jake Choi and Annie Funke can also be seen in other roles. Garrett Clayton and Matthew Postlethwaite, who previously starred as Gilbert Bradley and Gordon Bowsher in The Letter Men, can be seen in the roles of Jake and Sam.

== Distribution ==
The film premiered in the New American Cinema competition at the 2023 Seattle International Film Festival. It was subsequently screened at film festivals, including the Frameline Film Festival, Outfest, Reeling: The Chicago LGBTQ+ International Film Festival, and the 2023 Calgary International Film Festival.

== Reception ==
=== Reviews ===
All of the reviews listed on Rotten Tomatoes are positive.

Film Threat's Andrew Stover writes in his review that Nico Tortorella impresses with his undeniable charm and winning smile as the central character in The Mattachine Family, even in moments where his pain over the loss of Arthur comes to the fore.

=== Awards ===
Calgary International Film Festival 2023

- Nomination for Best International Feature Film (Andy Vallentine)

FilmOut San Diego 2023

- Award for Best Screenplay with the FilmOut Festival Award (Andy Vallentine and Danny Vallentine)

Seattle International Film Festival 2023

- Nomination in the New American Cinema Competition (Andy Vallentine)
- Nomination for Best Performance (Nico Tortorella)

OUT at the Movies International Film Festival 2023

- Nomination for Best Narrative Feature Jury Award
- Nomination for Best Narrative Feature Audience Award

Honolulu Rainbow Film Festival 2023

- Nomination for Adam Baran Humanitarian Award (Andy Vallentine)

=== Streaming ===
- Apple TV
- Amazon Prime
- Fandango At Home
