= Ptosha Storey =

American actress and singer

Ptosha E. Storey
- Born: January 4, 1974 Dallas, Texas, U.S.
- Occupation: Actress
- Years active: 1995–present
- Children: Jordan L. Jones

Ptosha Storey is an American actress and stage director, known for her role as Nancy Hallsen in the BET prime time soap opera, The Oval. She has also made a recent guest appearance in 'Grey's Anatomy' as Regina Evans in Season 22 Episode 5, 'Sometimes I Feel Like a Motherless Child' in 2025. She played as the best friend of Resident, Dr. Simone Griffith's mother.

== Life and career ==
Storey was born January 4 in Memphis, Tennessee, but she grew up in the projects of Dallas, Texas. She graduated from Booker T. Washington High School for the Performing and Visual Arts. She later attended Southern Methodist University. She has a son, Jordan L. Jones, who also works as an actor. He starred in the short-lived Fox sitcom Rel.

Storey began acting in 1990s, appearing on television. She had a secondary role in the 1996 television film The Road to Galveston starring Cicely Tyson. She guest starred on episodes of Wishbone , Strong Medicine and Numb3rs. She had many roles in theatre, include playing Ruth Younger in A Raisin in the Sun. She worked as assistant director in The Mountaintop, The Color Purple, Don't Bother Me, I Can't Cope, and Ain't Misbehavin'.

In 2016, Storey was cast in a recurring role in the Oprah Winfrey Network prime time soap opera, If Loving You Is Wrong produced by Tyler Perry. She later had a recurring role in the Fox prime time soap opera Empire. In 2018, Perry cast her in his thriller film Acrimony for playing Taraji P. Henson's character younger sister. The following year, Storey began starring in the BET prime time soap opera, The Oval, also created and produced by Tyler Perry. In December, 2020, she joined the cast of CBS daytime soap opera, The Young and the Restless playing Naya Benedict. She received Daytime Emmy Award for Outstanding Guest Performer in a Drama Series nomination for her performance at the 49th Daytime Emmy Awards.

== Filmography ==
Year	Title	Role	Notes
1996	The Road to Galveston	Motel Clerk	Television film
1995–1998	Wishbone	Ms. Walker	Episodes: "Barking at Buddha" and "Frankenbone"
2000	Moesha	Woman	Episode: "The Candidate"
2005	Strong Medicine	Alice Wilburn	Episode: "Gunshot Wedding"
2006	Numb3rs	Lawyer	Episode: "Killer Chat"
2009	In the Closet	Vanessa Maxwell	
2014	Petals on the Wind	Nurse	Television film
2015	Beautiful & Twisted	Hotel Guest	Television film
2015	The Soul Man	Gospel Lady	Episode: "No Weddings and Ten Funerals"
2015	Key and Peele	Gospel Singer	Episode: "Severed Head Showcase"
2016–2017	If Loving You Is Wrong	Tilda	Recurring role, 6 episodes
2017–2018	Empire	Chyna	Recurring role, 7 episodes
2018	Acrimony	Brenda	
2019–present	The Oval	Nancy Hallsen	Series regular
2020	The Step Daddy	Rochelle	
2020	Choices	Narrator	
2020–2021	The Young and the Restless	Naya Benedict	Recurring role, 34 episodes Nominated — Daytime Emmy Award for Outstanding Guest Performer in a Drama Series (2022)
2021	S.W.A.T.	Vanessa	Episode: "Crusade"
2022	Bid for Love	Angela	
2023	All American	Sadie Moore	Episode: "Time"
2023	Bel-Air	Mrs. Ahmad	Episode: "Mrs. Ahmad"
2025	Grey's Anatomy	(Guest Appearance) as Regina Evans	Season 22 Episode 5 "Sometimes I Feel Like a Motherless Child"
