= Khalilah Joi =

American actress

- Born: Thomasville, Georgia, U.S
- Occupation: Actress
- Years active: 2004–present

Khalilah Joi is an American actress.

== Life and career ==
Joi was born in Thomasville, Georgia and raised in Hampton, Virginia. She attended the University of Virginia and later moved to Los Angeles for acting on television and film. She made guest-starring appearances in television series Rosewood, Being Mary Jane, Agent Carter, S.W.A.T. and The Good Doctor, and co-starred in the 2017 crime thriller film A Violent Man. In 2019 she received positive reviews for playing a victim of sexual assault in an episode “Silent All These Years” of ABC medical drama Grey’s Anatomy. Later that year she had recurring roles in the HBO drama series, Big Little Lies playing Young Elizabeth Howard (Crystal R. Fox), and in the Sorry for Your Loss. She also played the leading role in the Oprah Winfrey Network Christmas comedy-drama film, Baking Christmas.

In 2021, Joi had recurring role as Condola Vargas in the ABC action drama series Station 19. Later that year she was cast as a series regular in the Bounce TV comedy-drama series, Johnson. She later guest-starred on Grand Crew and The Rookie: Feds and starred in the Allblk drama series, Hush. In 2023 she appeared in the comedy-drama film The Mattachine Family and played the lead in the drama film Black Girl Erupted directed by Vanessa Bell Calloway.

== Filmography ==
=== Film ===
| Year | Title | Role | Notes |
|---|---|---|---|
| 2004 | He Can Get It | Leesha | Video |
| 2004 | Till Death Do Us Part | - | Video |
| 2007 | Studio | Shani Jones | |
| 2011 | Wendigo | Ellie | |
| 2012 | Sistaah Friend | Sistaah Friend | Short |
| 2013 | Jonestown | Veronica Benton | Short |
| 2013 | Sex (Therapy) with the Jones | Amber | Short |
| 2014 | The Other Sister | Sarah | Short |
| 2014 | ABC Discovers: Los Angeles Talent Showcase | Herself | Short |
| 2014 | Delta-V | Valerie Brenn | Short |
| 2015 | Overexposed | Cassandra Bartlett | Short |
| 2015 | To Have & to Hold | Kyla | Short |
| 2017 | A Violent Man | Whitney | |
| 2019 | Bayou Tales | Angela's Mother | |
| 2019 | Baking Christmas | Jennifer | TV movie |
| 2021 | Apollyon | Jackie | |
| 2021 | The Case of Ana V. Rin | Ana | Short |
| 2023 | The Mattachine Family | Nurse Vera | |
| 2023 | Black Girl Erupted | Reina Cole | |

=== Television ===
| Year | Legacy | Role | Notes |
|---|---|---|---|
| 2011 | We the People with Gloria Allred | Daphne/Witness | Episode: "Broken Engagement Costs/If You Disobey You Gotta Pay" |
| 2015 | Rosewood | Regine Denard | Episode: "Necrosis and New Beginnings" |
| 2015 | Being Mary Jane | Charmane Harrison | Guest Cast: Season 2-3 |
| 2015 | Me, You, & Him | Jordan | Recurring Cast |
| 2015-17 | Sexless | Wendy | Main Cast |
| 2015-17 | Chef Julian | Wendy | Recurring Cast |
| 2016 | Agent Carter | Ticket Lady | Episode: "Smoke & Mirrors" |
| 2017 | S.W.A.T. | Briana | Episode: "Pilot" |
| 2018 | This Close | Ellie | Episode: "Night and Day" |
| 2018 | The Good Doctor | Mara's Mother | Episode: "Middle Ground" |
| 2019 | Project Blue Book | Valerie Mann | Episode: "Abduction" |
| 2019 | Grey's Anatomy | Abby | Episode: "Silent All These Years" |
| 2019 | Big Little Lies | Young Elizabeth | Recurring Cast: Seasons 2 |
| 2019 | Sorry for Your Loss | Nina | Recurring Cast: Seasons 2 |
| 2020 | Stuck with You | Tee | Guest Cast: Season 1-2 |
| 2021 | Station 19 | Condola Vargas | Recurring Cast: Season 4 |
| 2021-22 | Johnson | Naomi Johnson | Recurring Cast: Season 1-2 |
| 2022 | Grand Crew | Mason | Episode: "Wine & Hip Hop" |
| 2022-23 | Hush | Detective Angel Young | Recurring Cast: Season 1-2 |
| 2023 | The Rookie: Feds | Audrey Evans | Episode: "For Love and Money" |

=== Music video ===
| Year | Song | Artist | Role |
|---|---|---|---|
| 2017 | "Add to Me" | Ledisi | Party Guest |
