= The Keenen Ivory Wayans Show =

- Starring: Keenen Ivory Wayans
- Narrated by: Angelique Perrin
- Country of origin: United States

Production
- Production companies: Ivory Way Productions; Planet 24; Ancient & Modern Productions; Buena Vista Television

Original release
- Network: Syndication
- Release: August 4, 1997 – March 1998

The Keenen Ivory Wayans Show is a late night syndicated television talk show created by and starring comedian Keenen Ivory Wayans. The show premiered August 4, 1997, and was cancelled in March 1998. The show had an opening monologue and comedy sketches. His in-house band was an all-female band called Ladies of the Night. In many markets, the show was compared with and competed against the talk show Vibe, which launched at the same time. The two shows would poke fun of each other on occasion.

Guests who appeared on the show include Rick James, Jada Pinkett Smith, Samuel L. Jackson, Nicollette Sheridan, Mark Linn-Baker as well as Whitney Houston and music groups the Foo Fighters, Oasis, Bone Thugs-N-Harmony and The Firm.

In a 2013 interview by the Television Academy Foundation, Wayans expressed displeasure working on the show as he was not given complete creative freedom. His involvement on the show is often teased by his siblings.

== See also ==
- List of late night network TV programs
- Shauna Garr
- Terrance Dean
