= Paul Meyers (cinematographer) =

American cinematographer

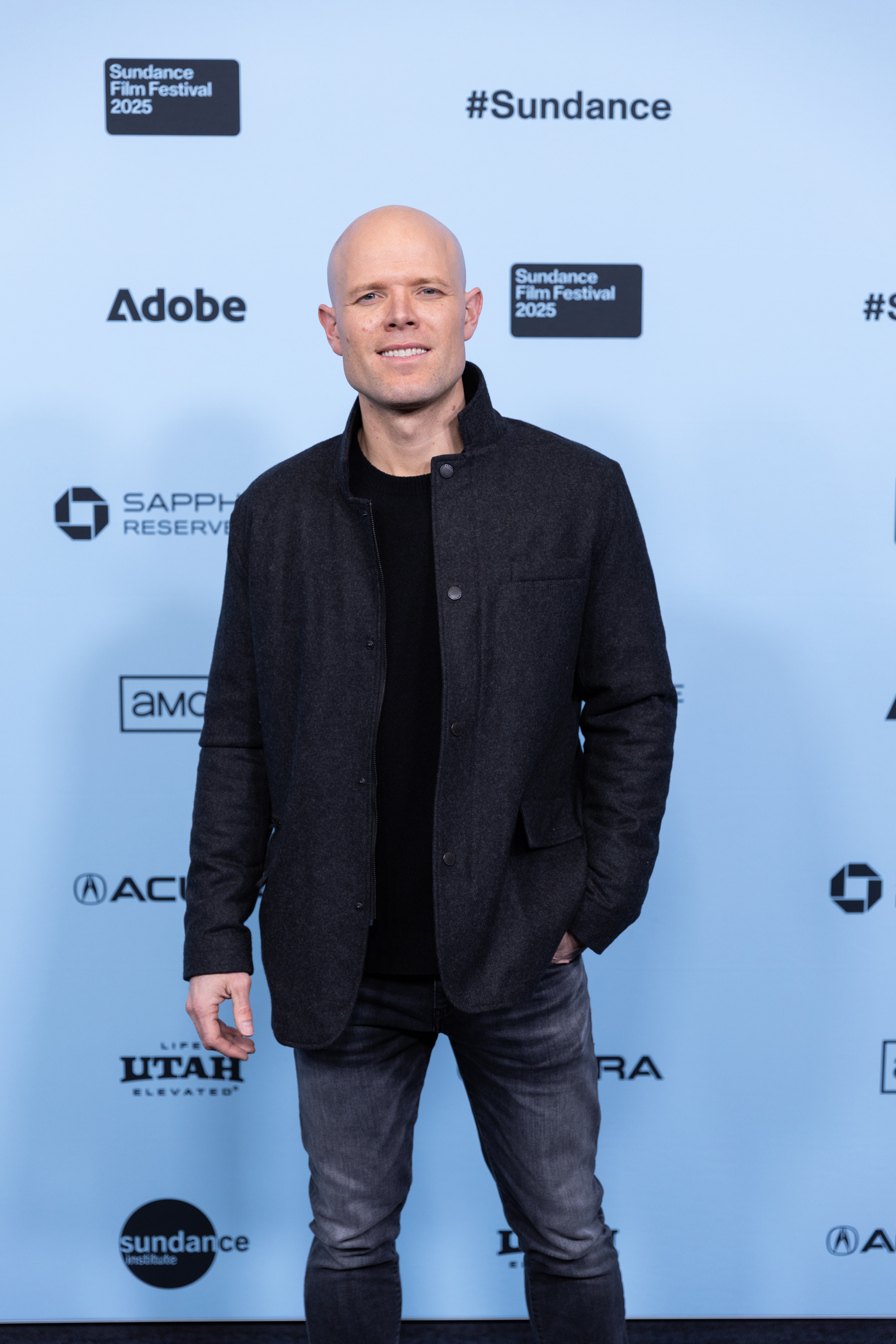
- Born: Provo, Utah, U.S.
- Occupation: Cinematographer
- Years active: 2017-present

Paul Meyers, ASC, is an American cinematographer.

== Career ==
Meyers was born in Provo, Utah. He attended Brigham Young University to study film. His career began with commercials, and he has worked for brands like Audi, Toyota, BMW, Vodafone, Johnson & Johnson, and more. His commercials have appeared during events like the Super Bowl, Olympics, and World Cup. In 2017, he explored other genres of commercial filmmaking beyond advertising projects.

Meyers's first feature film as a cinematographer was Omaha, released in 2025. He became a member of the American Society of Cinematographers (ASC) in 2020.

== Filmography ==
Year	Title	Director
2025	Omaha	Cole Webley
