= Dawn Halfkenny =

American actress

- Born: Dawnisha Halfkenny; West Virginia, U.S
- Occupation: Actress
- Years active: 2009–present

Dawn Halfkenny is an American actress. She is known for her role as Angela Parks in the Bounce TV prime time soap opera, Saints & Sinners (2016-2022) and as Brandi Richardson in the BET+ family crime drama series, The Family Business (2020-2024).

== Life and career ==
Halfkenny was born as Dawnisha Halfkenny in West Virginia and was raised in Texas. She moved to Atlanta in the late 2000s. She made her debut starring in the action comedy film Jack Squad (2009) and later began appearing in a number of Atlanta-filmed movies and television productions. She made guest starring appearances in Atlanta, Survivor's Remorse, The Haves and the Have Nots and Tales.

From 2016 to 2022, Halfkenny starred as Angela Parks in the Bounce TV prime time soap opera, Saints & Sinners. She later guest-starred on Black Mafia Family and The Resident, and had the recurring roles in the BET+ crime drama series, The Family Business, and the Bounce TV comedy-drama, Johnson. She co-starred in the 2021 thriller film Karen, and in 2022 starred in the BET+ drama film, Bid for Love. In 2023, she had supporting role in the BET+ romantic comedy film My Valentine Crush.

== Filmography ==
=== Film ===
Year	Film	Role	Notes
2009	Jack Squad	Kennedy	
2010	Intervention	Teresa	Short
2010	Breaking Up Is Hard to Do	Tasha	
2010	Stomp the Yard: Homecoming	Omega Theta Rho Sister #2	
2010	You're Fired	Sandra	Short
2011	Words to Kill	Stacie Bonet	
2011	Single in the ATL	Camille	
2011	Pinky Swear	Nurse	Short
2011	Who's to Judge	News Reporter	Short
2011	Girls Night Out (Exhale)	Drea	Short
2012	Inner Demons	Daphne	Short
2013	Inner Demons the Thrillogy	Daphne	
2013	Marry Me for Christmas	Charlene	Television film
2014	First Impression	Tryanna	
2014	My Dad's a Soccer Mom	Sherri	
2014	Marry Us For Christmas	Charlene	Television film
2015	For the Love of Ruth	Judy	
2015	Mr. Right	Norma	
2016	Bring Out the Lady	April	Television film
2018	Nothing Like Thanksgiving	Denise Parks	
2018	Gentrification	Stephanie Morris	
2018	Pierre Jackson	Dana Jackson	
2019	What Men Want	Waitress	
2019	Black Privilege	Dawn	Television film
2019	His, Hers & the Truth	Tamela	
2021	Fruits of the Heart	Alex	
2021	Bad Dad Rehab: The Next Session	Brandy	Television film
2021	Karen	Chanel McFadden	
2022	Bid for Love	Sasha	
2022	Hyde Park	Lola Henderson	
2022	Montross: Blood Rules	Robyn Montross	
2023	My Valentine Crush	Jasmine	
2023	Love Karma	Tenille Garner	
2024	A Heart That Forgives 2: The Battle Within	Sheila	
2024	My Valentine Wedding	Jasmine	
2025	South Haven	Marie	
2025	When Love Speaks	Lola Henderson	
2025	An Unusual Suspect	Latisha	
2025	How to Make Anyone Fall in Love with You	Madison Marks	
2025	Terry McMillan Presents: Preach, Pray, Love	Suzanne	Television film
2026	Thou Shalt Not Commit Adultery	Lola	Television film

=== Television ===
Year	Title	Role	Notes
2011	Osiris	Agent Reeves	Recurring Cast
2016	Atlanta	Nia	Episode: "The Club"
2016	Star	Hair Dryer Woman	Episode: "Pilot"
2016-22	Saints & Sinners	Angela	Recurring Cast: Season 1-5, Guest: Season 6
2017	Survivor's Remorse	Danyelle	Episode: "Feel Free To Comment"
2018	The Haves and the Have Nots	Kim	Episode: "Veronica's House"
2019	Tales	Cooper	Episode: "Slippery"
2020-24	The Family Business	Brandi Richardson	Recurring Cast, 18 episodes
2021-23	Johnson	Robin	Recurring Cast, 6 episodes
2022	I Got a Story to Tell	Jennifer	Episode: "I'm So Fateful"
2022	Twisted	Tisha	Episode: "Who Dis?"
2026	Surviving Sasha	Sasha	Series regular, 6 episodes
