= Breaking Up Is Hard to Do (film) =

- Directed by: Tabari Sturdivant
- Written by: Nikki Simpson; Tabari Sturdivant
- Produced by: Nikki Simpson
- Cinematography: Ross Sebek
- Edited by: Reginald Harrison
- Release date: June 26, 2010
- Running time: 108 minutes
- Country: United States
- Language: English

Breaking Up Is Hard to Do is a 2010 American romantic comedy film directed and co-written by Tabari Sturdivant.

== Premise ==
Set in Atlanta during the 2008 election season, Breaking Up Is Hard to Do follows the story of lovers Vince and Shonda as they agree to go into therapy in a last ditch effort to restore their love for one another.

== Cast ==
- Demetria McKinney as Shonda
- Kendrick Cross as Vince
- Dawn Halfkenny as Tasha
