= Safe-haven law =

U.S. statutes permitting leaving of unharmed infants by parents

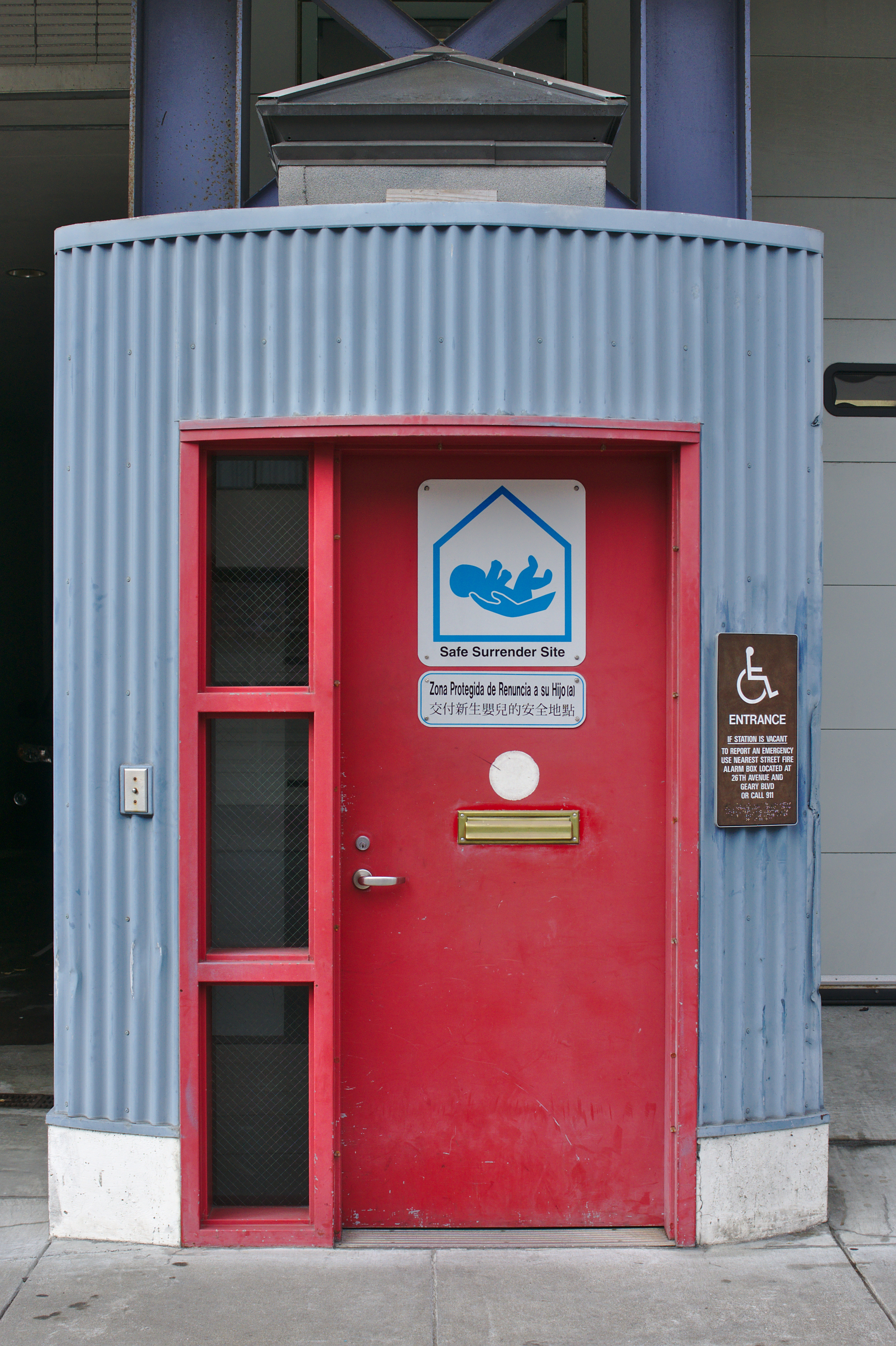
Sign at San Francisco Fire Station 14 designating it as a Safe Surrender Site

Safe-haven laws (colloquially known in some states as "Baby Moses laws", a reference to a figure from Abrahamic scriptures) are statutes in the United States that decriminalize the leaving of unharmed infants with statutorily designated private persons so that the child becomes a ward of the state. All fifty states, the District of Columbia, and Puerto Rico have enacted such statutes.

"Safe-haven" laws typically let parents remain nameless to the court, often using a numbered bracelet system as the only means of linking the baby to the parent. Some states treat safe-haven surrenders as child dependency or abandonment, with a complaint being filed for such in juvenile court. The parent either defaults or answers the complaint. Others treat safe-haven surrenders as adoption surrenders, hence a waiver of parental rights (see parental responsibility). Police stations, hospitals, and fire stations are all typical locations to which the safe-haven law applies.

In some places, a baby hatch or "baby box" is provided to allow babies to be safely dropped off anonymously and without encountering other people.

== History ==
According to historian Sara McDougall, infants were commonly left anonymously in ancient Rome with little stigma. As Christianity spread there, the Church argued that an abandoned child should be protected from dying. According to legend, Pope Innocent III dreamed of fishermen pulling drowned infants out of the Tiber River in their nets, and in 1198 he established “foundling wheels” in Italy. A baby was placed in a rotating wooden wheel set into the wall of a church or hospital, which turned the child inside without the person leaving it being seen. The practice later spread across Europe. Rachel Wagner writes that governments have taken in anonymously abandoned infants for centuries, and with the development of greater social services, Safe-haven law has become the formalization of govenments' responsibility to abandoned infants.

Texas was the first state to enact a "Baby Moses Law" in 1999 in a reaction to 13 incidents of child abandonment in that year, 3 of them involving infants discovered dead. The Texas legislation was sponsored by a newcomer Republican member of the Texas House of Representatives, Geanie Morrison of Victoria. This original Texas law also involved crisis pregnancy centers, which Laury Oaks describes as aimed to disuade people with unwanted pregnancies from abortion through biased options counseling, adoption promotion, and sharing parenting resources. In some states, these centers are now designated safe-haven locations.

By 2008, all 50 states had a form of safe-haven law.

The Safe Haven Baby Box founded in the US by a christian anti-abortion activist, Monica Kelsey, in 2016, with 447 boxes having been installed across the US as of June 2026. Designed to be completely anonymous, the baby is placed in the box from the outside, the door is closed, the box is locked to the outside, triggering a silent alarm to responders. Supporters like full anonymity for all parties and protecting babies from possible harm, though the federal or state governments does not track the frequency or count of babies surrendered under safe-haven laws to prove this. As of October 2026, 27 states allow baby boxes as a form of surrender without face-to-face contact: Idaho, Montana, South Dakota, Iowa, Wisconsin, Missouri, Kansas, Oklahoma, Texas, New Mexico, Arizona, Alaska, Louisiana, Mississippi, Alabama, Georgia, Florida, North Carolina, Tennessee, Kentucky, Virginia, West Virginia, Indiana, Ohio, Pennsylvania, New Hampshire, and Maine.

During oral arguments in Dobbs v. Jackson Women's Health Organization in December 2021, Justice Amy Coney Barrett asked repeatedly about safe-haven laws, suggesting they address the burdens of parenting that follow pregnancy by letting a parent surrender a newborn without legal consequences. Critics respond that surrender does not remove the physical and psychological burdens of pregnancy and childbirth, or the difficulty of permanently relinquishing a child. Wagner writes that as more women are unable to obtain abortions, more babies are likely to be born to women who do not wish to be parents.

== Controversy ==
Supporters of safe-haven laws argue that the laws save lives by encouraging parents to surrender infants safely, providing an alternative to abortion, infanticide, or child abandonment. Detractors argue that, because safe-haven laws do not require parents to be under stress, one parent will use the law largely to avoid notice to the non-surrendering parent. The laws have also been criticized due to the fact that in some states, safe-haven laws favor mothers.

Critics also argue that safe-haven laws undercut temporary-surrender laws, which were enacted specifically for parents who are unsure about whether to keep or relinquish their children. Supporters counter by arguing that anonymity is the only way to convince certain parents not to harm their infants, and that the benefit outweighs any claimed detriment. Various father's rights groups have also criticized how safe-haven laws can shut fathers out of the child's life without their knowledge or consent.

Controversy arose out of the safe-haven law enacted in Nebraska in July 2008: the Nebraska law in force at the time was interpreted to define a child as anyone under 18, and resulted in the desertion of children older than infants, some as old as teenage years. Under the prior version of the law, at least 35 children were dropped off in Nebraska hospitals in a four-month span, at least 5 of them from other US states. The law was changed in November 2008, allowing only infants up to 30 days old to be surrendered. The 2025 film Omaha is based on Nebraska's safe haven law before it was changed.

== Constitutionality ==
As of January 8, 2006, only one case, in Ohio, had challenged the constitutionality of a safe-haven law. Unable to allege personal harm, the plaintiff argued that the public had to know in advance that the State would not help parents hide children from each other. Also, because anonymity thwarted a non-surrendering parent from the outset, and could be used by any parent arbitrarily, the law threatened the public generally. The court dismissed the case, finding that the alleged harm did not rise to the level needed to justify a public action. Thus, the plaintiff's claim that the safe-haven law violated the separation of powers doctrine by circumventing the Supreme Court's rule-making authority remained unaddressed.

In 2007, an Ohio Court of Common Pleas vacated an original adjudication of deserted child and the commitment of the child to temporary custody of the Cuyahoga County Department of Children and Family Services (CCDCFS). The court ruled that the entire Ohio Deserted Child Act was void for violating the Supreme Court's rule-making authority. There, the parent had left the child at the hospital, expressing an intent to leave the child and to have the child adopted. The parent never contacted the hospital or the state agency afterward. The non-surrendering parent's identity and location were not fully known. After being granted temporary custody, the state agency moved for permanent custody, as needed for adoption. The attorney and the guardian ad litem for the child argued that certain statutes of the safe haven act violated the separation of powers doctrine under Art IV, Sec. 5(B) of the Ohio Constitution. The court agreed, finding that the safe-haven laws' notice and anonymity statutes conflicted with the notice provisions of Juvenile Rule 15 and the due diligence requirements of other court rules. Juvenile Rule 15 required issuing summons to the parties ordering them to appear before the court. Because the main purpose of the safe-haven law was to keep parents anonymous and immune from prosecution, Juvenile Rule 15 undermined the safe-haven laws' purpose. But the anonymity and notice statutes being procedural, the court rules governed. Because the notice and anonymity statutes could not be reconciled with the remaining safe-haven statutes, the whole safe-haven act was void. The original safe-haven complaint and permanent custody motion were dismissed. The case was not appealed.

== In popular culture ==
The Nebraska controversy in 2008 inspired the independent film Omaha, which starred John Magaro as a Utah father who takes his two children on a road trip in order to leave them at a hospital in Omaha.

The 2020 novel In Our Other Lives dramatizes the incident from 2008 when a father abandoned nine of his children at an Omaha hospital.

== See also ==
- Baby hatch
