= Killer Chat (Numbers) =

- Numbers episode
- Episode no.: Season 3 Episode 11
- Directed by: Chris Hartwill
- Written by: Don McGill
- Production code: 311
- Original air date: December 15, 2006

Guest appearances
- Buzz Aldrin as himself; Tymberlee Chanel as FBI Tech; Kevin Cristaldi as Wendell Henderson; Wendy Gazelle as Colleen McCrary; George Newbern as Brendan McCrary; Susie Pourfar as Mother; Johnny Simmons as Matt McCrary; Ptosha Storey as Lawyer; Ray Torres as John Santos; Robin Weigert as Elaine Tillman

Episode chronology
← Previous "Brutus"	Next → "Nine Wives"
- Numbers season 3

"Killer Chat" is the 11th episode of the third season of the American television show Numbers. In the episode, Federal Bureau of Investigation (FBI) agents investigate the murders of several child molesters while a pair of mathematicians prepare to say goodbye to a friend. Stories about child molesters and his own experiences as a parent inspired series writer Don McGill to write the episode.

"Killer Chat" also serves as the final episode of series regular Peter MacNicol before his stint on 24. As a way to send MacNicol's character, Dr. Larry Fleinhardt, off, producers and McGill sent his character into space and asked astronaut Buzz Aldrin to appear in the episode. Due to production constraints, director Chris Hardwell had to shoot one of Larry's first scenes in the episode as MacNicol's final scene.

"Killer Chat" first aired in the United States on December 15, 2006. Fans and several members of the crew found themselves opposing the episode's gore. In contrast, critics gave the episode positive reviews.

== Plot summary ==
Child molester John Santos (Ray Torres) is found tied to a chair and beaten to death in a vacant house up for sale, the third such victim in the past six weeks. Since a serial killer is suspected, the FBI is called in to assist with the investigation. Meanwhile, Dr. Larry Fleinhardt (Peter MacNicol) prepares for his upcoming mission to the International Space Station, which he learned some time earlier that he would be a participant in. Dr. Charlie Eppes (David Krumholtz), Larry's friend and colleague, returns Larry's lucky t-shirt, which Larry had given to Charlie to keep during Larry's mission. FBI Special Agent Don Eppes (Rob Morrow) calls in Charlie and Larry for their assistance. The team learns that the three victims have been using a chat room to lure their victims and have all contacted the same chatter. FBI Special Agent Megan Reeves (Diane Farr) interview the first victim's wife, Mrs. Elaine Tillman (Robin Weigert), who denies any knowledge of her husband's online activities. Charlie suggests using a multi-attribute composition model to find the type of house that the killer would most likely use.

While Charlie, Larry, and Dr. Amita Ramanujan (Navi Rawat), Charlie's girlfriend and colleague, develop their model, Larry receives a phone call informing him that he is no longer a part of the mission. At Charlie's house, Charlie and Amita learn from Alan Eppes (Judd Hirsch), Don and Charlie's father, that a MIT professor had asked NASA to look into Larry's recent behavior. As a result of Larry's homelessness, NASA decided to pull Larry from the mission. FBI Special Agent David Sinclair (Alimi Ballard) and Colby Granger (Dylan Bruno) take Brendan McCrary (George Newbern), a frequent visitor in the chat room that the molesters used, into custody. When the team questions McCrary, they learn, and further investigation confirms, that McCrary joined an online group which attempts to peacefully catch child molesters after his daughter, Katie, was raped and murdered by one, and he has an alibi for two of the murders. While working on their model, Charlie tells Amita that he feels bad for being happy that Larry was not going to space, and Amita tells Charlie that he should not beat himself up over his emotions. Their analysis soon reveals that the killer's preferred houses are located in Megan's Law and Jessica's Law zones.

David finds online videos of the molesters' confessions taped just before their murders. While attempting to trace the source of the videos, Charlie finds one uploading as the agents discuss the case and uses onion routing to trace the live feed. Unknown to Charlie, the killer piggybacked the system, causing Charlie to send the agents to an address two blocks from the site of the latest murder. Later, Charlie suggests using the syntax of the chats to determine if McCrary or any of his relatives, who would have similar syntax to McCrary, could have contacted the victims. Meanwhile, Larry expresses his disappointment about the mission to Megan, and Megan asks Charlie to help Larry fulfill his dream. While Megan brings the files containing the chats to Charlie, she and Amita overhear Charlie vouching for Larry to someone at the NSA. Larry later thanks Charlie for persuading NASA officials to allow Larry to be on the mission.

Using the information from Charlie's analysis, Don visits the McCrary family. He learns that McCrary's son Matt (Johnny Simmons) thought that his family was not doing enough to stop molesters after what happened to his sister, so Matt contacted someone in an online support group for families affected by sexual predators to discuss non-violent ways of vengeance. He also gave them the names and contact information of predators that his father was investigating, but he swears that he didn't know they were going to be tortured and killed and is horrified that he was an accessory to murder. Megan interviews Mrs. Tillman again and realizes that her husband, Scott, molested their daughter. The team learns of a new victim and finds the house where he is being held. Inside, they find the victim being held hostage by Mrs. Tillman. Megan convinces Mrs. Tillman to surrender peacefully by promising that the molester will be prosecuted to the fullest extent of the law, because there was enough evidence to convict him of his crimes, and the agents arrest both people. After the arrest, Charlie and the team say goodbye to Larry at the office. Megan and Larry say goodbye near the walkway, where Buzz Aldrin appears to escort Larry to the launch. On launch day, everyone gathers at the house to watch the launch, with both Eppes brothers toasting Larry seconds before liftoff.

== Production ==
=== Casting ===
While filming Numb3rs, series regular Peter MacNicol accepted a role on the television series 24. Since he only wanted to be on the show for half a season, he spent the first 11 episodes of Numb3rs filming both series. MacNicol left Numb3rs after 11 episodes to continue with his role on 24. When filming "Killer Chat", there was some question as to whether MacNicol would return to the series since he also wanted to produce a film during his absence from Numb3rs.

To send off MacNicol's character, the creators and producers decided to ask a real astronaut to appear on the show. They asked Buzz Aldrin, Neil Armstrong, and Captain Jim Lovell, a fan of the show who had a previously scheduled event during "Killer Chat"'s filming schedule, to make the appearance. Upon hearing other people's reviews of the show, Aldrin agreed to make the appearance. His role was to escort Larry to the shuttle mission.

=== Writing ===
Series writer Don McGill wrote "Killer Chat". After reading about sex predators who were victimized by sexual molestation themselves, McGill wanted to explore the effects of molestation on the victims' and the predators' families. As a parent, he also wanted to demonstrate a balance between his feelings about sexual molestation and how the law treats the criminals. He asked series researcher Andrew Black to find chats where predators contacted children. Using the chats, McGill modified them to include leetspeak and included a part where Charlie discussed analyzing the texts to determine the identity of the suspected killer.

Black and McGill also incorporated onion routing into the script. Originally, the technique was to be included in the previous episode "Brutus", but, due to the complexity of the topic, it never made it into the script. They instead decided to use onion routing in "Killer Chat". McGill wanted to use a "trawling algorithm", a way to catch an online identity that is hidden by Internet encryption. Black and California Institute of Technology (Caltech) computer science professor Steven Lowe developed a mathematical algorithm to stand in for McGill's trawling algorithm. For the metaphor to be used to describe how onion routing works, Lowe suggested comparing onion routing to nestled envelopes.

During the early phases of writing the script, McGill told Black that Charlie was going to analyze crime scenes with no other commonalities between them other than they are empty houses. Black suggested using multi-attribute compositional modeling.

Since "Killer Chat" also was MacNicol's last Numb3rs episode, McGill had to juxtaposition the crime with MacNicol's departure. The producers wanted a farewell that was fitting for Larry and that would allow for him to return. Knowing that Larry's dream was to go into space, the producers contacted NASA about the requirements of being an astronaut. The writers decided to send Larry off aboard the Space Shuttle. For Larry's final scene toward the end of the episode, series executive producer Barry Schindel suggested the Right Stuff-type scene.

=== Filming ===
Before he directed the episode, director Chris Hardwell spent five weeks on the Numb3rs set watching the cast and crew film the series. While filming, he gave the writers some insight into his direction. Since series regular Diane Farr was five months pregnant at the time, Hardwell filmed around her belly. He also directed guest star Robin Weigert to act like the perfect housewife in order to disguise the plot twist. Several scenes were shot at Caltech, including one near the Beckham Auditorium and one at an outdoor restaurant. For the final scene, Hardwell used a crane shot on the Numb3rs sound stage.

Due to production constraints, the first scene shot was the scene where the agents and Charlie said goodbye to Larry at the FBI office. MacNicol's last filmed scene was set toward the beginning of the episode when Charlie and Larry discussed using multi-attribute compositional modeling to determine the commonalities of the houses. For MacNicol and series regular David Krumholtz, filming became emotional as the episode paralleled real life. Prior to Numb3rs, they had developed a friendship when they worked together while filming the movie Addams Family Values.

== Reception ==
Over 11.23 million people watched "Killer Chat". As it was a violent episode, fans protested the amount of gore featured. While filming, several people on the set questioned the amount of blood shown in the episode.

Critically, the episode was very well received. Cynthia Boris of DVD Verdict called the episode "well plotted, engaging". Donald Liebenson, an Amazon.com editor, stated that "Killer Chat" was "compelling". In their article "Pop CSI: How Science Conquered TV", Popular Science described how Andrew Black incorporated the math for the episode into Don McGill's script.
