= Acrimony (film) =

2018 film by Tyler Perry

- Theatrical release poster
- Directed by: Tyler Perry
- Written by: Tyler Perry
- Produced by: Mark E. Swinton; Will Areu; Ozzie Areu; Tyler Perry
- Starring: Taraji P. Henson; Lyriq Bent; Crystle Stewart; Ptosha Storey; Jazmyn Simon; Ajiona Alexus; Antonio Madison; Bresha Webb; Danielle Nicolet; Nelson Estevez; Kendrick Cross
- Cinematography: Richard J. Vialet
- Edited by: Larry Sexton
- Music by: Christopher Lennertz
- Production company: Tyler Perry Studios
- Distributed by: Lionsgate
- Release date: March 30, 2018
- Running time: 120 minutes
- Country: United States
- Language: English
- Budget: $20 million
- Box office: $46.4 million

Acrimony is a 2018 American psychological thriller film written, produced and directed by Tyler Perry. The film stars Taraji P. Henson, Lyriq Bent, and Crystle Stewart. It follows a psychotic wife who stalks and nearly kills her ex-husband when he becomes successful after she spent her whole life supporting him.

Originally titled She's Living My Life, development began sometime before 2015. Principal photography began in October 2016 in Pittsburgh, while post-production took place sometime in 2017. Acrimony was released in the United States by Lionsgate on March 30, 2018. It received negative reviews from critics but a positive reception from audiences. However, it was a box office success, grossing $46.4 million on a production budget of $20 million.

== Plot ==
Melinda Moore bumps into engineering student Robert during college, goes into a rage and assaults him physically and verbally, revealing her abnormal tendencies. Later that day, he visits her dorm room to return papers that got mixed up in the previous altercation. On the day of her mother's funeral, Melinda and Robert have sex in his RV and start dating. Melinda later discovers Robert cheating on her with Diana Wells. Enraged, Melinda rams Robert's RV with her car. She passes out from injury and is rushed to the hospital for an emergency full hysterectomy, rendering her infertile. Melinda and Robert reconcile and marry, despite the objections of her sisters, June and Brenda.

For eighteen years, Melinda supports them both, as Robert cannot find work because he is focused on developing his invention. Robert talks Melinda into mortgaging their house so he can build a prototype of a revolutionary self-charging battery he has been designing with hopes to sell to venture capitalist Prescott. Diana, now working as an assistant to Prescott, arranges for Robert to have a meeting with him. After finding Diana's wallet in Robert's truck, June and Brenda tell Melinda that he is cheating on her again. Melinda's family runs a catering business and offers Robert a job, warning him that if they miss out on delivering to a client, they will lose their truck contract. En route to his delivery, Robert gets a call from Diana saying Prescott wants to reconsider his deal. This causes Robert to abandon his delivery job mid-route. Prescott offers $800,000 for the design, but Robert wants to license the technology to them instead and declines the offer. Melinda, furious at both Robert's declining and his interaction with Diana, files for divorce and moves in with Brenda. Robert moves into a homeless shelter, but Diana finds out and insists that he live with her.

Prescott later offers Robert a multi million-dollar deal while allowing him to keep the intellectual property, which he accepts. Robert visits Melinda at work, although she refuses to reconcile. Robert accepts her decision but, as an apology, gives her $10 million and buys back her home. Regretting that she abandoned him, Melinda visits Robert in his new penthouse apartment and attempts to rekindle their relationship, but Diana appears and introduces herself as Robert's fiancée.

Furious, Melinda swears to destroy the couple. She sues them, claiming that the deal with Prescott happened before their divorce, but the case is dismissed. The couple file a countersuit against Melinda and obtain restraining orders. As Melinda's behavior worsens, even her family turns on her as they advise the couple to hire bodyguards and install security measures in their house. Melinda eventually chases the couple away. Melinda retaliates by visiting a bridal shop and destroying Diana's wedding gown with acid. She is caught and sentenced to court-mandated counseling, where she tells her therapist that Robert took advantage of her. Her therapist suggests that she may have borderline personality disorder. Melinda's mental state further deteriorates after learning Diana is pregnant. On Robert's wedding day, Melinda's family and friends are forced to prevent her from leaving her house and ruining the wedding.

Robert and Diana leave on their honeymoon cruise. Melinda sneaks onto the boat, shoots Robert, and makes the boat's crew jump overboard. Robert then overpowers Melinda and pushes her in the water, then tells Diana to take the dinghy and rescue the crew. Melinda returns and attempts to kill Robert with an axe. In moving to avoid the axe, Robert accidentally pushes the anchor release button with his foot. Melinda becomes entangled by the anchor's chain, which pulls her into the ocean, drowning her. Diana returns with the crew and comforts Robert.

== Cast ==
- Taraji P. Henson as Melinda Moore Gayle
- Lyriq Bent as Robert Gayle
- Crystle Stewart as Diana Wells
- Ptosha Storey as Brenda Moore
- Jazmyn Simon as June Moore
- Ajiona Alexus as Young Melinda Moore Gayle
- Antonio Madison as Young Robert Gayle
- Bresha Webb as Young Brenda Moore
- Danielle Nicolet as Sara
- Nelson Estevez as Casey
- Kendrick Cross as Kalvin
- Racquel John as Young June Moore
- Douglas Dickerman as Mr. Prescott
- Shavon Kirksey as Young Diana Wells

== Production ==
=== Development ===
Development began sometime before 2015. It was originally titled She's Living My Life.

=== Casting ===
Tika Sumpter originally was cast as Diana Wells, but later left and Crystle Stewart took the role.

=== Filming ===
Filming took place around Pittsburgh and Atlanta in fall 2016, beginning in October 2016 and ending around November 2016. The cinematographer was Richard J. Vialet.

=== Post-production ===
Post-production took place sometime in 2017. Larry Sexton was the film's editor.

=== Music ===
The film's score was composed by Christopher Lennertz.

== Release ==
The film was released in the United States on March 30, 2018.

== Reception ==
=== Box office ===
Acrimony grossed $43.5 million in the United States and Canada, and $2.9 million in other territories, for a worldwide total of $46.4 million.

In the United States and Canada, Acrimony was released alongside God's Not Dead: A Light in Darkness and Ready Player One, and was projected to gross $10–15 million from 2,006 theaters in its opening weekend. It made $7.6 million on its first day, including $1 million from Thursday night previews. It went on to debut to $17.2 million, finishing second, behind Ready Player One, and besting both projections and the $10 million opening of Henson's Proud Mary two months earlier. It fell 51.2% in its second weekend to $8.4 million, finishing fifth.

=== Critical response ===
On the review aggregator website Rotten Tomatoes, 18% of 36 critics' reviews are positive, with an average rating of 3.1/10. The website's consensus reads: "Tyler Perry's Acrimony might be of interest to hardcore Tyler Perry fans, but all other viewers are advised to make time for another Fatal Attraction screening instead." On Metacritic, the film has a score of 32 out of 100, based on 14 critics, indicating "generally unfavorable" reviews. Audiences polled by CinemaScore gave the film an average grade of "A−" on an A+ to F scale.

Monica Castillo of RogerEbert.com gave the film a negative review, writing that "Taraji P. Henson deserves better." In a negative review, Ben Kenigsberg of The New York Times wrote that "the moral of Acrimony seems to be: Leave a bad man, especially one who cheated on you before marriage and leeches off your financial resources — unless he has poured his life into the dream of inventing a self-recharging battery, in which case the bonds of matrimony are sacrosanct and no sacrifice is too great" and that the film itself was "endorsing the logic that keeps spouses Stockholm syndrome'd in bad marriages".

== See also ==
- List of black films of the 2010s
