= Daphne Wayans =

American television personality

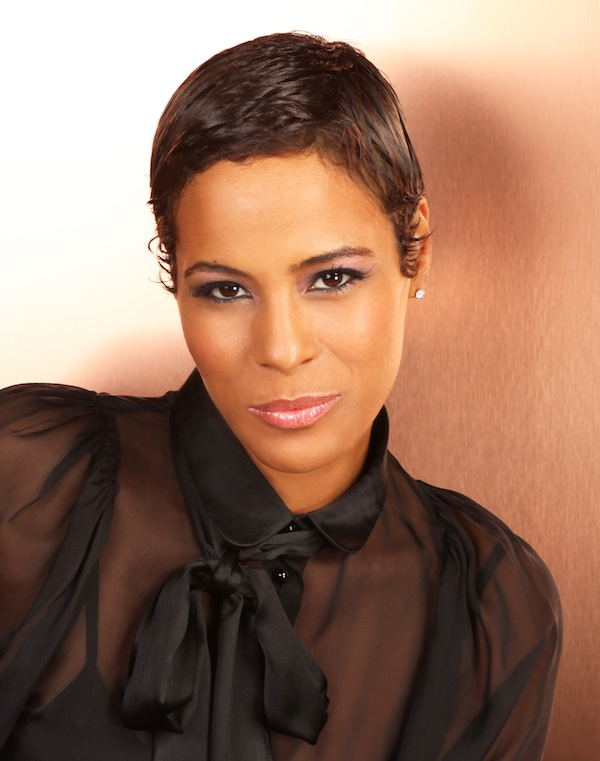
- Born: Daphne Sharmaine Denise Polk; May 21, 1971 (age 55); Inglewood, California, U.S.
- Spouse: Keenen Ivory Wayans (m. 2001; div. 2006)
- Children: 5
- Website: daphnewayans.com

Daphne Sharmaine Denise Wayans (née Polk) is an American television personality. She is the former wife of Keenen Ivory Wayans, creator of the FOX sketch comedy In Living Color.

== Personal life ==
Daphne was raised in Inglewood, California and attended Westchester High School in Los Angeles. She attended the Fashion Institute of Design & Merchandising in Irvine, California, a for-profit private college that educates students for the Fashion, Entertainment, Beauty, Interior Design and Graphic Design industries.

Daphne first met Keenen through their mutual friend, actor Eddie Murphy. The couple has 5 children together: Jolie, Nala, Keenen Jr., Bella, and Daphne. The couple divorced in 2006 but remain close friends.

Daphne currently serves on the board of the New Village Leadership Academy, a private elementary school located in Calabasas, California, founded by actor Will Smith and his wife Jada Pinkett-Smith.

On September 12, 2012, television network VH1 announced the addition of Daphne to the cast of the reality television series Hollywood Exes. Although she had been part of the original cast who pitched the show to VH1, she decided not to appear in the first season.

Daphne offers parenting and relationship advice as a guest blogger on The Huffington Post and prides herself on living a healthy lifestyle.

== Producing ==
Daphne was a co-producer on "Dying Laughing," a stand-up comedy documentary that features such comedians as Jerry Seinfeld, Kevin Hart, Amy Schumer, Jamie Foxx and the late Garry Shandling.

== Music ==
Daphne co-wrote the song "Carte Blanche" with Doug Grigsby for recording artist Teena Marie. The song was released on Teena Marie's album Beautiful in 2013.

== See also ==
The cast of Hollywood Exes.
