= Johnson (TV series) =

- Genre: Comedy drama
- Created by: Deji LaRay
- Starring: Deji LaRay; Thomas Q. Jones; Philip Smithey; Derrex Brady; Khalilah Joi; D.L. Hughley
- Composer: Philippe Pierre
- Country of origin: United States
- Original language: English
- No. of seasons: 4
- No. of episodes: 40

Production
- Executive producers: Cedric The Entertainer; Deji LaRay; Thomas Q. Jones; Eric Rhone; Reesha L. Archibald; David Hudson
- Running time: 30 minutes
- Production companies: Bird and a Bear Entertainment; Midnight Train Productions

Original release
- Network: Bounce TV
- Release: August 1, 2021 – present

Johnson is an American comedy drama television series created by Deji LaRay and executive produced by Cedric The Entertainer that premiered on Bounce TV on August 1, 2021. The series stars LaRay, Thomas Q. Jones, Philip Smithey, Derrex Brady and D.L. Hughley as a best friends, all with the same last name of Johnson. The series was shot on location in Atlanta, Georgia.

On July 13, 2020, Johnson was renewed for a second season, which premiered on July 20, 2022. On April 27, 2023, the series was renewed for a third, which premiered on August 5, 2023. The fourth season premiered on August 3, 2024.

== Cast and characters ==
- Deji LaRay as Greg Johnson
- Thomas Q. Jones as Omar Johnson
- Philip Smithey as Keith Johnson
- Derrex Brady as Jarvis Johnson
- Khalilah Joi as Naomi Johnson
- D.L. Hughley as Eugene Johnson
- Kwajalyn Brown as Sherrie Johnson
- Chloe James as Danni Anderson
- Jessica Luza as Lisa Johnson
- Rosa Acosta as Bianca Torres
- Teryn Simmons as Jackee
- Terri Abney as Serena
- James Austin Kerr as Kevin MacDonald
- Saidah Nairobi as LaQuisha
- Dawn Halfkenny as Robin
- Terri J. Vaughn as Wanda Brooks
- L. Warren Young as Freddie Sr.
- Sherry Richards as Valerie Johnson

== Episodes ==
Season	Episodes	Originally released	
Season	Episodes	First released	Last released
1	10	August 1, 2021	October 3, 2021
2	10	July 10, 2022	September 18, 2022
3	10	August 5, 2023	September 30, 2023
4	10	August 3, 2024	October 5, 2024
