= South Central Love =

- Directed by: Christina Cooper
- Written by: Christina Cooper
- Produced by: Christina Cooper; Wynton Payne
- Starring: Jamal Henderson; Christina Cooper; Vanessa Simmons
- Cinematography: Stevie Murrell
- Edited by: Wynton Payne
- Music by: Pei Pei Chung; Andre Hill
- Production company: Christina Cooper Productions
- Distributed by: Black Waterhorse
- Release date: August 9, 2019 (United States)
- Running time: 80 minutes
- Country: United States
- Language: English

South Central Love is a 2019 American drama film directed and written by Christina Cooper, who co-produce it with Wynton Payne. It stars Jamal Henderson as Davonte and Cooper as Bria, with Vanessa Simmons, Timothy DeLaGhetto, Jordan L. Jones, and Skyh Black in supporting roles. The story follows two young people from different backgrounds whose relationship develops while they face family problems and violence in their community.

The film was theatrically released by Black Waterhorse in the United States on August 2019.

== Plot ==
Davonte is a young man from South Central Los Angeles whose friends and contacts are all associated with criminal activities and gangs. He tries to avoid violence and pressure associated with his environment.

Davonte starts reconsidering his current position and thinks about making changes in his life. He meets Bria, a girl who comes from another world. While Bria and Davonte differ socially, they notice similar aspects of their personal lives such as problematic families and friends. The relationship develops quickly, and Bria starts getting more involved in Davonte's life.

Meanwhile the family of Bria does not approve of her relationship with Davonte and thinks that she should stay away from him and his environment. Davonte himself has problems due to the pressure of people around and because of violence surrounding him in his neighborhood.

Increased acts of violence put more pressure on the relationship between Davonte and Bria. Davonte finds himself reconsidering the friends he has made and his actions that have allowed him to maintain a connection to his environment. Slowly, he comes to trust his instincts and tries to make decisions that will let him free from the pressures of being a young Black man living in South Central Los Angeles.

In the face of escalating criminal activity and issues of loyalty, Davonte’s decision to try and change his life takes center stage in his relationship with Bria. Both Davonte and Bria find themselves pondering the impact their decisions have on their own future as well as others in their community.

== Cast ==
- Jamal Henderson as Davonte
- Christina Cooper as Bria
- Vanessa Simmons as Vanessa
- Timothy DeLaGhetto as Shy Boy
- Skyh Black as Kesean
- Jesselynn Stegall as Stephanie
- Kyle Lewis as EJ
- Jordan L. Jones as Meech
- Kendon Tillis as Rex
- Duane Finley as Kris
- Harley Huff as Tiana
- Markice Moore as Kyrie
- Brian D. Mason as Ben
- Amani Summers as Raejanae
- Leticia Perez as Camilla
- Viandra Dunn as Tati

== Reception ==
Kimber Myers of the Los Angeles Times praised the film's opening, visual presentation and romantic scene, describing Jamal Henderson as a "charming lead". But, she criticized the script for being predictable and lacking well-developed characters, as well as for the dialogue being overly instructive. Christian Sauvé praised South Central Love for its depiction of life in South Central Los Angeles and Christina Cooper's ability to establish a believable setting, despite the low-budget production. Sauvé noted that the romantic aspect of the movie was best when it departed from the usual images of South Central, but he felt that the crime and loyalty theme was less unique. Nonetheless, Sauvé felt that it made for an interesting movie and a good script.
