= Hollywood Exes =

American reality television series

- Genre: Reality
- Starring: Nicole Murphy; Andrea Kelly; Mayte Garcia; Jessica Canseco; Sheree Fletcher; Shamicka Lawrence (season 2–3); Shanna Moakler (season 3)
- Theme music composer: Arika Kane
- Opening theme: "Make It"
- Country of origin: United States
- Original language: English
- No. of seasons: 3
- No. of episodes: 32

Production
- Executive producers: Pam Healey; Lisa Shannon; Leah Hariton; Vernon Lynch; Jeff Dyson; Nicole Murphy; Susan Levison; Jill Holmes; Laurel Stier
- Running time: 40–43 minutes
- Production companies: Lynch-Dyson Entertainment; Shed Media

Original release
- Network: VH1
- Release: June 27, 2012 – July 2, 2014

Related
- Atlanta Exes

Hollywood Exes is a 2012-2014 American reality television series that aired for three seasons on VH1. The series chronicles the lives of seven ex-wives of famous men. The series led to one spin-off, Atlanta Exes, which ran for one season in 2014.

== Production ==
In September 2012, VH1 announced that Hollywood Exes had been renewed for a second season with Daphne Wayans joining the cast. The second season premiered on July 8, 2013.

In January 2014, VH1 announced that the third season would premiere on May 7, 2014, with Shanna Moakler joining the cast. The spin-off show of the series, Atlanta Exes, premiered on August 18, 2014.

On October 22, 2020, it was announced that a reunion special titled Hollywood Exes: Reunited will premiere on November 24, 2020.

== Cast ==
Cast	Seasons		
Cast	1	2	3
Nicole Murphy	Main	Main	Main
Mayte Garcia	Main	Main	Main
Jessica Canseco	Main	Main	Main
Sheree Fletcher	Main	Main	Main
Andrea Kelly	Main	Main	Main
Shamicka Lawrence		Main	Main
Shanna Moakler			Main

- Nicole Murphy (season 1–3), ex-wife of comedian/actor Eddie Murphy, engaged to retired NFL and television personality Michael Strahan;
- Mayte Garcia (season 1–3), ex-wife of pop star Prince;
- Jessica Canseco (season 1–3), ex-wife of former baseball player Jose Canseco;
- Sheree Fletcher (season 1–3), ex-wife of actor and rapper Will Smith; then-wife to retired NFL player Terrell Fletcher
- Andrea Kelly (season 1–3), ex-wife of R&B singer R. Kelly;
- Shamicka Lawrence (season 2–3), ex-wife of comedian/actor Martin Lawrence;
- Shanna Moakler (season 3), ex-wife of musician Travis Barker.

=== Recurring ===
- Josie Canseco, daughter of Jessica and Jose Canseco;
- Jose Canseco, former baseball player and Jessica's ex-husband;
- Terrell Fletcher, former NFL player turned pastor and Sheree's then-husband.
- Daphne Wayans (Season 2), friend of the ladies and ex-wife of Keenen Ivory Wayans

== Episodes ==
Season	Episodes	Season premiere	Season finale
1	11	June 25, 2012	August 29, 2012
2	13	July 8, 2013	October 6, 2013
3	8	May 7, 2014	July 2, 2014

=== Season 1 (2012) ===
No. overall	No. in season	Title	Original release date	Viewers (millions)
1	1	"Episode 1"	June 25, 2012	2.00
Anxious to start a new life and stop living in her ex-husband's shadow, Andrea Kelly, ex-wife of R. Kelly, leaves her home town of Chicago to check out L.A. In L.A., she has a close friend in Nicole Murphy, ex-wife of Eddie Murphy. Nicole takes her under her wing and introduces Andrea to her friends and fellow Hollywood exes, Sheree Fletcher, ex-wife of Will Smith, Jessica Canseco, ex-wife of Jose Canseco, and Mayte Garcia, ex-wife of Prince. The women bond over their unique position as famous exes. Meanwhile, Jessica has lunch with Jose, who has a startling proposal for her.
2	2	"Episode 2"	June 27, 2012	0.84
Despite warnings from her friends, Jessica seriously considers letting Jose move back in with her. Anxious to meet Mr. Right, Mayte resorts to a professional matchmaker, who urges her to "de-Prince" her home. Meanwhile, Andrea finds a house and throws a wild housewarming party, during which Jessica shocks the others with tales from her lurid past.
3	3	"Episode 3"	July 4, 2012	0.44
Just when Jessica thinks she might still be in love with Jose, she receives a bombshell from him, and worries about how the news will affect their daughter, Josie. Andrea, now a small fish in a big pond, is overwhelmed by the stress of starting a master dance class in L.A. Meanwhile, Sheree and Terrell find themselves at odds over their long-distance marriage; at some point soon someone is going to have to move.
4	4	"Episode 4"	July 11, 2012	0.66
Anxious to escape the stress in their lives, the ladies head to Napa Valley for a weekend of fine food, fine wine, and (hopefully) fine men. During the trip, Jessica confronts Jose about his bad choices, and gives him an ultimatum.
5	5	"Episode 5"	July 18, 2012	0.66
Nicole sets Mayte up on her first blind date, which stresses Mayte out. Meanwhile, Jessica breaks the news about Jose to Josie, then is shocked to learn that Josie is planning a visit to Planned Parenthood.
6	6	"Episode 6"	July 25, 2012	0.97
Tony sets Andrea up on a date with a local friend. Andrea is willing to meet him, but worries how he will react when he finds out that R. Kelly is her ex. Meanwhile, Mayte plans a big party for her mother's birthday, and enlists the ladies to perform a scantily-clad belly dance for the crowd.
7	7	"Episode 7"	August 1, 2012	0.81
Controversy erupts during a weekend getaway to Palm Springs after Jessica accuses the others of being hypocrites. Sheree calls Jessica out by bringing up a secret she told Sheree in confidence.
8	8	"Episode 8"	August 8, 2012	0.96
Mayte receives bad news from the fertility doctor. Later, at a group dinner, Mayte becomes enraged at what she believes is Jessica's inconsiderate attitude.
9	9	"Episode 9"	August 15, 2012	0.97
Nicole and Sheree speak to Mayte and Jessica respectively about the blow-up that occurred nights before. Andrea makes a decision about the future of her romance. Jessica invites all the ladies, including Mayte, to a polo event.
10	10	"Episode 10"	August 22, 2012	0.79
Sheree struggles to find support for her skin care product. Andrea schemes to come up with a way to better promote her under-attended dance classes. Nicole becomes flustered when nothing goes according to plan at her clothing line launch party.
11	11	"Episode 11"	August 29, 2012	0.96
In the season finale, Mayte and Andrea make physical attempts to put their exes behind them, once and for all. Meanwhile, Jessica receives another upsetting call from Jose, then struggles with the guilt she still feels over ending their marriage. Later, the ladies rehearse a number for Andrea's upcoming dance benefit, during which one of them has a serious and painful accident. With less than an hour before show time, an ambulance is called.

=== Season 2 (2013) ===
No. overall	No. in season	Title	Original release date	Viewers (millions)
12	1	"Episode 1"	July 8, 2013	1.78
Drea returns to Los Angeles with a grudge against Jessica, and Mayte considers adopting a baby girl in need.
13	2	"Episode 2"	July 14, 2013	0.89
Nicole is with her family in Sacramento. She regrets missing her father's last moments but looks forward to planning a celebration of life in his honor. Jessica talks to Mayte about her plan to adopt a baby girl, as it appears to have been a rash decision. Jessica rants about the challenges of being a single mother. Mayte finds Jessica's concern to be a little much. Jessica goes on, talking about Mayte's animals and the child's eventual desire for a family environment, and Mayte dismisses the thoughts. Drea talks to her assistant, Tony, about what to do for work while her broken foot heals.
14	3	"Episode 3"	July 23, 2013	0.72
Mayte frantically prepares to bring a baby into her home, Nicole enjoys a little too much tequila prior to giving a public speech, and Jessica Canseco annoys Drea.
15	4	"Episode 4"	July 28, 2013	0.95
Nicole receives a visit from Shamicka, and wants to introduce her to the group. Drea is annoyed by a comment Jessica made after meeting Mayte's new baby. Sheree reveals her true feelings about Jessica during her birthday party,
16	5	"Episode 5"	August 4, 2013	0.66
Sheree asks Jessica why she fled from her birthday dinner. Drea and Tony catch up in Chicago. Drea informs Tony about her recent trip to Los Angeles. Later, Sheree and Jessica are in New York City with Nicole. Nicole tells the others she invited Shamicka Lawrence to join them. Jessica announces there's liquor, but Shamicka admits she doesn't drink. Meanwhile, Drea works with dancers at her studio. In L.A., Mayte shoots an instructional belly dancing video. Drea hosts a family dinner in Chicago. They all talk about Drea's life in Los Angeles vs. Drea's life in Chicago.
17	6	"Episode 6"	August 11, 2013	0.62
Jessica invites everyone to her lingerie-themed birthday party. Drea chooses not to attend. Jessica to confronts Drea in person, during which all hell breaks loose.
18	7	"Episode 7"	August 18, 2013	0.81
Drea reveals the personal struggles she's dealing with back in Chicago, which play a part in her behavior towards Jessica. Nicole plans a birthday party and expects both Drea and Jessica to attend.
19	8	"Episode 8"	September 1, 2013	0.58
The girls head out of town for a weekend in [Park City. Mayte realizes the other women plan on wearing real fur. Shamicka, who is hosting the trip, is offended by Mayte's behavior. Things go from bad to worse when Mayte threatens to leave.
20	9	"Episode 9"	September 8, 2013	0.95
Still in Park City, Nicole feels compelled to hide one of her furs from Mayte. Later, while she, Sheree, and Shamicka are out shopping, Mayte and Jessica find the fur and decide to make a statement by cooking it. When Nicole discovers what they've done, drama erupts between the ladies.
21	10	"Episode 10"	September 15, 2013	0.70
22	11	"Episode 11"	September 2013	N/A
23	12	"Episode 12"	September 29, 2013	0.58
24	13	"Episode 13"	October 6, 2013	0.72

=== Season 3 (2014) ===
No. overall	No. in season	Title	Original release date	Viewers (millions)
25	1	"Episode 1"	May 7, 2014	1.54
The ladies come together at Nicole's house for dinner, and to meet the newest cast member — Shanna Moakler. After ignoring the other women, Drea makes a return. Mayte ends up shattering her friendship with Nicole.
26	2	"Episode 2"	May 14, 2014	0.83
Drea invites all of the ladies for dinner, where she hopes Nicole and Mayte can correct their friendship. Mayte ends up in a heated exchange with Drea and Sheree. Nicole and Shanna fly to Las Vegas where they are judges at Miss Nevada USA.
27	3	"Episode 3"	May 21, 2014	0.88
Shanna hosts a poker party, where Tony confronts Drea's fiancé. Jessica and Mayte introduce their new boyfriends.
28	4	"Episode 4"	May 28, 2014	1.07
29	5	"Episode 5"	June 4, 2014	0.90
30	6	"Episode 6"	June 11, 2014	0.92
31	7	"Episode 7"	June 25, 2014	0.97
32	8	"Episode 8"	July 2, 2014	0.88

== Reception ==
Zap2it's Elizabeth Brady described the cast as "sympathetic and agreeable" finding it "refreshing to see that there might be a place for women who play nice every now and then in reality TV." She added that "Hollywood Exes is certainly not the most compelling series of the summer, but it has its moments."
