= Torrei Hart =

American TV personality

- Born: Torrei Skipper; February 28, 1978 (age 48); North Philadelphia, Pennsylvania, U.S.
- Occupations: Actress, producer, comedian
- Spouse: Kevin Hart (m. 2003; div. 2011)
- Children: 2

Torrei Hart (born as Torrei Skipper on February 28, 1978) is an American actress, producer, comedian, and TV personality.

She is known for her roles in films such as American Bad Boy and Perfectly Single, and for appearing on the VH1 reality series Atlanta Exes. In addition to her work in entertainment, Hart has pursued business ventures related to beauty and wellness.

== Career ==
Hart began her career by appearing in national commercials for major brands such as eBay and Toyota. In late 2012, she launched the YouTube comedy channel PrettyFunnyFish, where she created and starred in comedic sketches.

In August 2014, Hart joined the cast of VH1 reality series Atlanta Exes, which chronicled the lives of women previously married to celebrities. She starred alongside Christina Johnson, Tameka Foster, Sheree Buchanan and Monyetta Shaw. Hart had a role in American Bad Boy, which was released On-Demand across platforms in 2015. She joined the cast of comedy Almost Amazing in 2016, which was later acquired and released by Uncork'd Entertainment in theaters in late August 2017.

In June 2018, Hart performed her first stand-up act in Los Angeles at the Ha Ha Comedy Club and established herself as a comedian. That same month, she ventured into the beauty industry with the launch of hair care line, Heavenly Hart Haircare, inspired by her daughter. Later in June, Hart was announced as a host of Zeus Network unscripted show Talking Sh*t.

Hart starred in Perfectly Single, which premiere at American Black Film Festival in June 2019. In January 2022, Hart announced the release of drama Super Turnt, a sequel to the 2020 film Turnt. She both starred in and produced the films alongside her business partner and producer Mann Robinson. She also starred and executive produced crime-horror film, Sebastian.

In 2024, Hart joined comedian Katt Williams on his "Dark Matter Tour," performing stand-up comedy across various cities. Hart launched a comedy interview podcast, Brutally Honest with Torrei Hart, on Urban One Podcast Network in 2025.

== Personal life ==
Hart married Kevin Hart in 2003, and they filed for divorce in 2010 after citing irreconcilable differences. Torrei Hart revealed in an interview from 2017, that the reason for her and Kevin Harts split was due to infidelity. Hart shares joint custody of their two children. The divorce was finalized in November 2011.

== Filmography ==
- American Bad Boy (2015)
- Almost Amazing (2017)
- But Deliver Us From Evil (2017)
- Resolution Song (2018)
- Perfectly Single (2019)
- Dear Frank (2019)
- A Shot For Justice (2019)
- Turnt (2020)
- Super Turnt (2022)
- Sebastian (2023)
