= Deji LaRay =

American actor

- Born: Atlanta, Georgia, U.S
- Occupations: Actor, producer
- Years active: 1995–present

Deji LaRay is an American actor, writer, editor and producer.

== Life and career ==
LaRay was born and raised in Atlanta, Georgia. He began performing at a young age appearing in the drama film Once Upon a Time... When We Were Colored (1995) and the made-for-television movie The Wedding (1998), and guest-starred on the television series New York Undercover and Any Day Now. He made his Broadway debut in The Shadow Box at the age of 13. He later moved to Los Angeles and graduated from the California State University with BA in Film and TV.

During the 2000s, LaRay guest-starred in a number of television shows include ER, The Shield, Charmed, Dirty Sexy Money, Without a Trace and had recurring role in American Dreams. He wrote and directed 2007 drama film Neighborhood Watch and later acted in films Abducted (2014), Killing Lazarus (2016), Burning Sands (2017) and The Last Scout (2017). From 2014 to 2021 he played Julius Edgewood in the Amazon Prime Video crime drama series, Bosch. He reprised his role in the 2023 sequel series, Bosch: Legacy. He also appeared in three episodes of Oprah Winfrey Network drama series, Greenleaf in 2016. LaRay also worked as a music video editor in "Baby I", "Cannonball", "My Favorite Part" and "Dirty Computer". He received the MTV Video Music Award for Best Editing nomination for "Make Me Feel".

In 2021, LaRay created and plays one of the four male lead characters in Johnson, a comedy-drama series for Bounce TV. In 2022 he wrote and starred in the action thriller film, Escaping Paradise.
