= Kendrick Cross =

American actor

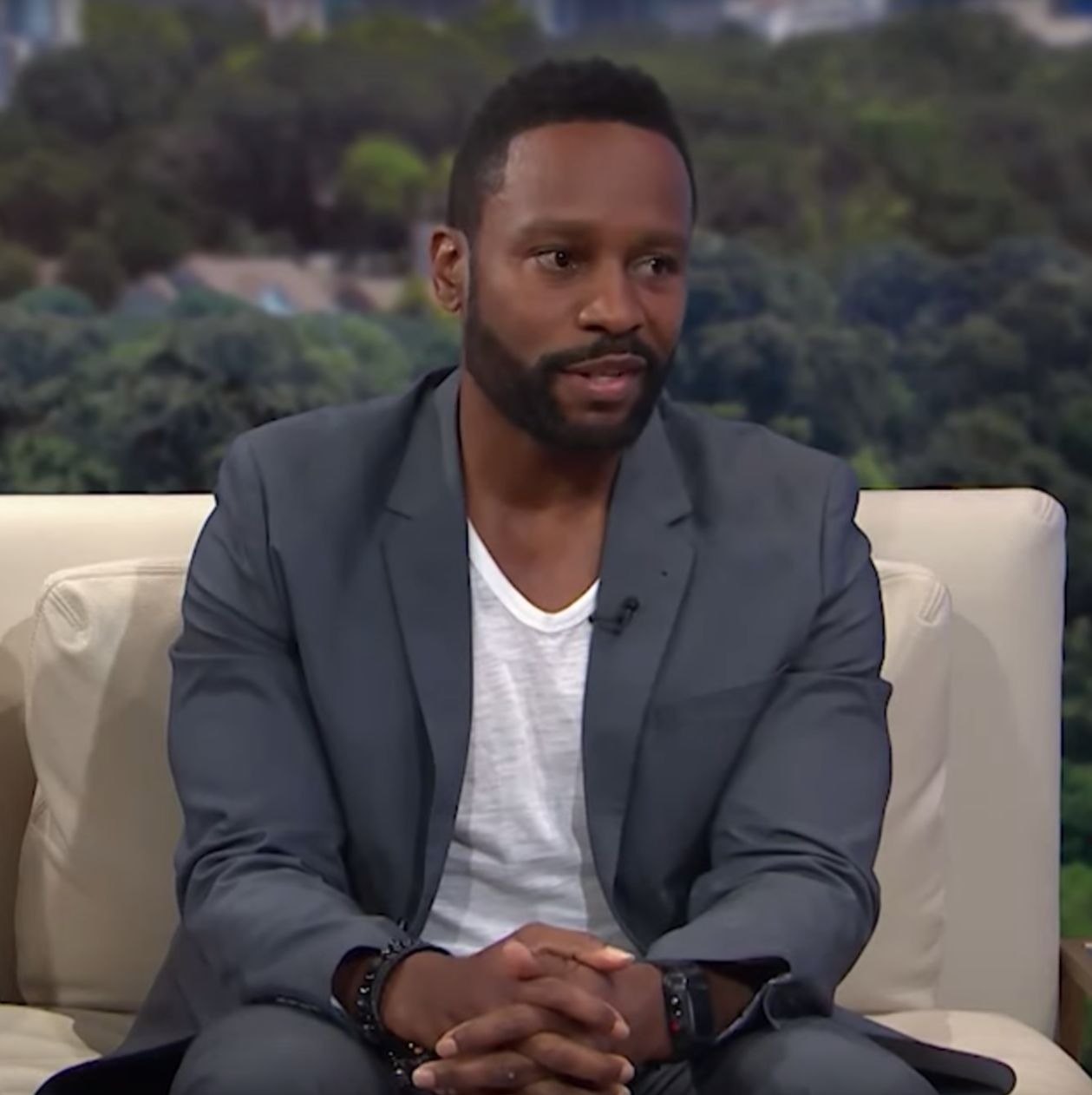
- Cross in 2019
- Born: May 1, 1971 (age 55); Louisville, Kentucky, U.S
- Occupation: Actor
- Years active: 2000–present

Kendrick Cross (born May 1, 1971) is an American actor.

== Early life ==
Cross was born in Louisville, Kentucky and raised in South Carolina.

== Career ==
He began acting on stage, before appearing on television, in episodes of Dawson's Creek, Army Wives, Drop Dead Diva and One Tree Hill. Cross had a recurring roles on The Game, The Haves and the Have Nots and Saints & Sinners. He also guest starred on Born Again Virgin, House of Cards, Homeland, Dynasty and Black Lightning.

In 2019, Cross starred in the Oprah Winfrey Network prime time soap opera, Ambitions. The series was canceled after single season. In 2021, he had a recurring role on Queen Sugar and appeared on Genius: Aretha. In 2022, Cross had a recurring role as Agent Wallace in the fourth season of Netflix series, Stranger Things, and starred in the Allblk horror anthology series, Terror Lake Drive.

In film, Cross has appeared in For Colored Girls (2010), The 5th Wave (2016), All Eyez on Me (2017), Acrimony (2018), Tales from the Hood 2 (2018), Goosebumps 2: Haunted Halloween (2018), and The War with Grandpa (2020).

In January 2023, he joined the cast of General Hospital in the recurring role of Detective Bennett.

== Filmography ==
=== Film ===
Year	Title	Role	Notes
2002	Max	Ivan	Short
2006	Viewfinder	Bruce	
2007	The Lure of Young Women	Arnez	Video
2007	Death Sentence	Armed Guard	
2008	Scarlet Sage	-	Short
2009	Taking Chances	Lawyer	
2010	The Wronged Man	David	
2010	Breaking Up Is Hard to Do	Vince	
2010	For Colored Girls	Man #5	
2010	Don't Blame the Lettuce	Maurice	
2011	The 5th Quarter	Fireman	
2011	Letters to a Father	Anderson Cummings	Short
2011	Kenny Powers: The K-Swiss MFCEO	Lonzo	Short
2012	Hornet's Nest	Dispatcher Mike	TV movie
2012	Probable Cause	Travis	
2013	Scary Movie 5	Rescue Worker	
2013	Iron Man 3	Helicopter Pilot #2	
2013	Broken Aster	Greg	Short
2013	A Christmas Blessing	Steven	TV movie
2014	Sabotage	DEA Agent #2	
2014	First Impression	Julius	
2014	My Other Mother	Lewis	TV movie
2015	Accidental Love	Security Guard	
2015	The Divergent Series: Insurgent	Candor Guard	
2015	To Hell and Back	Alvin Wilson	TV movie
2015	My First Love	Jahaad	Video
2016	The 5th Wave	Situation Room Soldier	
2016	Killing Reagan	Danny Spriggs	TV movie
2017	All Eyez on Me	F.O.I	
2017	When Love Kills: The Falicia Blakely Story	Raymond	TV movie
2017	Oscar Pistorius: Blade Runner Killer	Jacob Abba	
2017	Father Figures	Firefighter Dad	
2018	Acrimony	Kalvin	
2018	Smoke	Adrian Brown	
2018	Tales from the Hood 2	Henry Bradley	
2018	The Front Runner	Chairmaker	
2018	Conrad & Michelle: If Words Could Kill	Detective Spain	TV movie
2018	Goosebumps 2: Haunted Halloween	Sam's Father	
2019	In Broad Daylight	William Boudreaux	TV movie
2019	Overcomer	Ken Jones	
2019	Richard Jewell	GBI Guy	
2020	Coins for Love	Demarco	TV movie
2020	Greenland	F.E.M.A. Supervisor	
2020	A Murder to Remember	Ed	TV movie
2020	The War with Grandpa	Insurance Adjuster	
2021	Coins Forever	Demarco	TV movie
2021	A Sisterly Christmas	Keith Fisher	TV movie
2023	Praise This	Uncle Larry	
2023	Shit is Crazy: First Day of Summer	Emmett	Short
2023	Whatever It Takes	Devin Sr	TV movie
2024	Single Black Female 2: Simone's Revenge	Trevor Williams	TV movie
2024	Die Hart 2: Die Harter	Kevin's Agent	

=== Television ===
Year	Title	Role	Notes
2000	Dawson's Creek	Medic	Episode: "Great Xpectations"
2008	Tyler Perry's House of Payne	Kevin	Episode: "Moral Dilemma"
2008–09	Army Wives	Detective Paulsen	Recurring Cast: Season 2, Guest: Season 3
2010	The Gates	Tech Guy	Episode: "Breach"
2010	Drop Dead Diva	Police Chief	Episode: "Will & Grayson"
2011	Teen Wolf	Deputy	Episode: "Pack Mentality"
2011	Sid Roth's It's Supernatural!	Surprise Sithole	Episode: "Surprise Sithole 2011"
2012	The Rickey Smiley Show	Leo	Episode: "The Desperate House Wife"
2013	Witches of East End	Orderly	Episode: "Pilot"
2014	The Game	Omari McGhee	Recurring Cast: Season 7
2014	Under the Dome	Orderly	Episode: "Going Home"
2015	Secrets and Lies	Uniform	Recurring Cast: Season 1
2015	Born Again Virgin	Andre	Episode: "Slaying Your Dragons"
2015	Sleepy Hollow	Lawyer	Episode: "This Red Lady from Caribee"
2016	Zoe Ever After	Sean	Episode: "Pilot"
2016	The Haves and the Have Nots	Dr. Jackson	Recurring Cast: Season 3
2016	The Vampire Diaries	Officer Albert	Episode: "I Went to the Woods"
2016	Containment	Mr. Graham	Episode: "Be Angry at the Sun"
2016–17	Saints & Sinners	Benjamin Truman	Recurring Cast: Season 1, Guest: Season 2
2017	Mann & Wife	Police Officer	Episode: "Mann in Charge"
2017	House of Cards	Secret Service Agent	Episode: "Chapter 65"
2017	Nashville	Client #4	Episode: "Farther On"
2017	NCIS: New Orleans	Special Agent Johnson	Episode: "Viral"
2018	Step Up	Brandon	Episode: "Shuffle"
2018	Homeland	Secret Service Agent	Recurring Cast: Season 7
2018	Dynasty	Jim Lewis	Episode: "Use or Be Used"
2018	The Resident	Chief Medical Officer	Episode: "00:42:30"
2018	Mr. Mercedes	Detective	Recurring Cast: Season 2
2018	Black Lightning	Kito Payne	Episode: "The Book of Rebellion: Chapter Two: Gift of the Magi"
2019	The Inspectors	Darnell	Episode: "Senior Week"
2019	Last Call	Craig	Episode: "Hard Knock Life"
2019	Ambitions	Titus Hughes	Main Cast
2021	Queen Sugar	Jackson Fotenot	Recurring Cast: Season 5
2021	Genius	Herbert	Episode: "Do Right Woman"
2022	The Wonder Years	Dave Payton	Episode: "Lads and Ladies and Us"
2022	Stranger Things	Agent Wallace	Recurring Cast: Season 4
2022	Terror Lake Drive	Dr. Eric Matthews	Recurring Cast: Season 2
2022	Rap Shit	Brian	Recurring Cast: Season 1
2022–24	General Hospital	Detective Calvin Bennet	Regular Cast
2023	Will Trent	Grady Parnell	Episode: "Don't Let It Happen Again"
