= Omaha (film) =

2025 film by Cole Webley

- Theatrical release poster
- Directed by: Cole Webley
- Written by: Robert Machoian
- Produced by: Preston Lee
- Starring: John Magaro; Molly Belle Wright; Wyatt Solis
- Cinematography: Paul Meyers
- Edited by: Jai Shukla
- Music by: Christopher Bear
- Production companies: Sanctuary Content; Kaleidoscope Pictures; Monarch Content
- Distributed by: Greenwich Entertainment
- Release dates: January 23, 2025 (Sundance); April 24, 2026 (United States)
- Running time: 84 minutes
- Country: United States
- Language: English
- Box office: $171,317

Omaha is a 2025 American drama film directed by Cole Webley from a screenplay by Robert Machoian. The film stars John Magaro as a father who takes his two children on a cross-country trip after a family tragedy. It is produced by Preston Lee.

Omaha made its world premiere on January 23, 2025, at the Sundance Film Festival as an entry in the U.S. Dramatic Competition category. It was released in the United States on April 24, 2026.

== Plot ==
Martin, a widowed father, wakes up his two children, Ella and Charlie, after their home is foreclosed, claiming that they are merely going on a road trip. At a restaurant, he deliberately gives their dog, Rex, human food, much to Ella's objection. Later, Martin surrenders Rex at an SPCA shelter. He eventually reveals that they are heading to Nebraska. Ella asks if they could visit the zoo when they get to Omaha after a woman at the gas station recommends so; Martin says he is unsure.

The family arrives at a motel in Omaha; Ella observes her father crying helplessly. Although he is almost out of money, Martin takes the children to the zoo anyway. That night, he takes the kids to a hospital and abandons them there. The next day, Martin wakes up in his car returns to the hospital where a nurse, Edie, invites him in to fill out paperwork and informs him that social workers had picked up his children that night and are no longer at the hospital.

The film's epilogue explains that in July 2008, Nebraska passed a safe-haven law which decriminalized the act of abandoning children for the state to take in. Since the law did not specify an age, this led to parents travelling to Nebraska to drop off older children. Thirty-five children were abandoned in the state before the law was rewritten, none of them infants.

== Cast ==
- John Magaro as Martin
- Molly Belle Wright as Ella
- Wyatt Solis as Charlie
- Talia Balsam as Edie
- Christina Cooper as Lisette, woman at the gas station

== Production ==
Omaha screenwriter Robert Machoian, a Brigham Young University professor of photography, first conceived the idea for the script in 2008. He submitted it to a Sundance Film Festival screenwriter's lab in 2013, but it was rejected. Machoian later premiered his feature film, The Killing of Two Lovers, at the 2020 edition of the festival.

Cole Webley made his feature directorial debut with the film. He became involved with the project after he met Machoian at Sundance and read the screenplay.

Production formally began in 2022 after Webley joined the project. Its filming schedule included 20 days in Utah, where scenes were shot in historic mining towns and the state's salt flats.

== Release ==
Omaha made its world premiere on January 23, 2025, as part of the 2025 Sundance Film Festival's U.S. Feature Competition category. In April 2025, Greenwich Entertainment acquired North American distribution rights to the film. It is scheduled to be released in the United States on April 24, 2026.

== Reception ==
On the review aggregator website Rotten Tomatoes, 91% of 85 critics' reviews are positive, with an average rating of 7.5/10. The website's consensus reads: "A melancholy journey leading to a mysterious destination, Omaha rewards patience with its cumulative emotional wallop and John Magaro's quietly haunting performance." Metacritic, which uses a weighted average, assigned the film a score of 74 out of 100, based on 15 critics, indicating "generally favorable" reviews.

=== Accolades ===
Award	Category	Recipient(s)	Result	Ref
Deauville American Film Festival	Jury Prize	Omaha	Won (Note: Tied with Olmo.)	
Kerry International Film Festival	Best International Feature	Omaha	Won	
Newport Beach International Film Festival	Best Feature Narrative Director	Cole Webley	Won	
Newport Beach International Film Festival	Best Feature Narrative Actor	John Magaro	Won	
Hamptons International Film Festival	Special Jury Award	Molly Belle Wright	Won	
