= Friends of the People =

American sketch comedy television series

- Genre: Sketch comedy
- Created by: Kevin Barnett
- Developed by: Kevin Barnett; Josh Rabinowitz
- Starring: Kevin Barnett; Jennifer Bartels; Jermaine Fowler; Lil Rel Howery; Keith Lucas; Kenny Lucas; Josh Rabinowitz
- Country of origin: United States
- Original language: English

Production
- Executive producers: Neil Punsalan; Michael Rotenberg; Michele Armour; Avi Gilbert; Kevin Barnett; Josh Rabinowitz; Jermaine Fowler; Jennifer Bartels; Lil Rel Howery; Keith Lucas; Kenny Lucas
- Camera setup: Single camera
- Running time: 30 minutes
- Production companies: C-Moose Productions; 3 Arts Entertainment; Marobru Productions

Original release
- Network: TruTV
- Release: October 28, 2014 – September 24, 2015

Friends of the People is an American sketch comedy television series. It was slated to premiere on TruTV in summer 2014, but was pushed to October 28, 2014, as part of the network's shift in their programming direction. Many of the cast members (Jennifer Bartels, Jermaine Fowler, and Lil Rel Howery) were originally reported to be cast members of a planned revival of In Living Color which never materialized. The show's first season consisted of 10 episodes. This made it the network's first sketch comedy show. The series held a TV-14 rating, though select episodes were rated TV-MA — also a first for the truTV network.

== Cast ==
- Kevin Barnett
- Jennifer Bartels
- Jermaine Fowler
- Lil Rel Howery
- Keith Lucas
- Kenny Lucas
- Josh Rabinowitz
