= Tameka Foster =

American wardrobe stylist

- Born: January 1, 1971 (age 55); Oakland, California, U.S.
- Other names: Tameka Raymond; Tameka Foster Raymond
- Education: Fashion Institute of Design & Merchandising
- Occupations: Designer, fashion stylist
- Years active: 1993–present
- Spouses: Ryan Glover (divorced); Usher (m. 2007; div. 2009)
- Children: 5
- Website: www.cultdejour.com www.tamekaraymond.com

Tameka Foster (born January 1, 1971) is an American fashion stylist.

She has worked as a personal stylist for Lauryn Hill, Jay-Z, Toni Braxton, Ciara, Patti LaBelle, Nas, and her ex-husband Usher.

== Career ==
Her professional career started with her employment as a retail sales associate, which evolved into management positions. During her attendance at FIDM, Foster worked as a dresser at the Giorgio Armani fashion shows, and since then she has styled numerous celebrities, including Jay-Z, Lauryn Hill, Ciara, Nas, and Mary J. Blige.

Foster's work as a stylist gained the attention of several media outlets including MTV, E! and Access Hollywood. She has also been featured in People, InStyle, Glamour, Vibe, Upscale, and Essence magazines.

On August 18, 2014, Foster joined the cast of Atlanta Exes on VH-1's spin-off of Hollywood Exes, co-starring with Christina Johnson, Torrei Hart, Sheree Buchanan and Monyetta Shaw.

In August 2019, Foster, with the help of her sons, launched a 3-D animated series entitled The Odd Life of Kile Lyles. It began development in 2013 and is the story of a quirky 11-year-old boy experiencing the classic middle child syndrome. His day-to-day life of creating various gadgets that decorate his room and treehouse changes drastically after a visit to an antique toy museum.

== Philanthropy ==
Foster is a co-founder of the Oakland Natives Giveback (ONGB) nonprofit organization founded in 2008 alongside Dr. Nyeisha DeWitt and Dee Dee Abdur-Rahim. Their aim was to give back to the children in the community in which they were raised. The first ONGB initiative was the annual Attend and Achieve Back to School Rally at Oakland City Hall. The event was an expo for the start of the school year, where children received fully loaded backpacks, public-transportation vouchers, shoes, and school supplies.

Foster is credited as the founder of charity organization The Lost Ones Foundation, founded in 2009. It is a non-profit organization that helps girls aged 12-18 who exist in at-risk environments.

In March 2013, on what was to be her son Kile's 12th birthday, she honored him by launching the 501c(3) nonprofit organization Kile's World Foundation, whose mission is "gifting children with endless possibilities of creative endeavor through applied, fine, and performing arts," and intends to offer comprehensive art education to children ranging from ages 10‐17.
