= Bid for Love =

Romantic drama film by Arthur Muhammad

- Directed by: Arthur Muhammad
- Written by: Erick S. Gray; N'Tyse
- Produced by: Shauna D. Balfour; Christina Cooper; N'Tyse; London Williams
- Starring: Dawn Halfkenny; Adrian Lockett; Blue Kimble; Ptosha Storey; Tami Roman; Nikki Dixon; Kwaylon Rogers; Jermel Howard; Jayda Cheaves
- Cinematography: Samuel Hicks
- Edited by: Arthur Muhammad
- Music by: Thomas Dawson Jr.
- Production company: Sisters of Freedom
- Distributed by: BET+
- Release date: June 22, 2022
- Running time: 93 minutes
- Country: United States
- Language: English

Bid for Love is a 2022 American romantic drama film written by Erick S. Gray and N'Tyse and directed by Arthur Muhammad. The film loosely based on the play My Mistakes Do Not Define Me by Lawainna Patterson and Shelly Garrett. The film stars Dawn Halfkenny, Blue Kimble, Adrian Lockett and Tami Roman. It follows recently released from the prison Sasha (played by Halfkenny) who falls in love with the manipulative Malik (Lockett). Her therapist (Roman) helps her avoid the same problems that landed her in prison during her past relationship with ex-boyfriend Memphis (Kimble).

The film was released by BET+ on June 23, 2022. A series, originally developed as a feature film following the original, Surviving Sasha was released on April 21, 2026 on Tubi.

== Cast ==
- Dawn Halfkenny as Sasha
- Adrian Lockett as Malik
- Blue Kimble as Memphis
- Tami Roman as Dr. Simone
- Ptosha Storey as Angela
- Nikki Dixon as Jewel
- Kwaylon Rogers as Titi
- Jermel Howard as Detective Carter
- Jayda Cheaves as Juvie
- Porsha Hall as Jackie
- Kenny Gardner as James
- Clifton Powell as Haywood
- Eva Marcille as Linda
- Cynthia Bailey as Dr. Parker Bailey
- Darrin Dewitt Henson as Mr. Neely
- Erica Peeples as Detective Worthing
- Angela White as Alexis
- David Banner as Aadam Baraka
- DreamDoll as Princess
- Stephen Cofield Jr. as Duke
- Komiko Powell as Dawn Cambridge
- Mia Hunt as Shaunda
- Norman Nixon Jr. as Detective Grayson

== Sequel ==
A sequel, Bid for Love 2 was filmed in Dallas in May 2023 for 2024 release, starring Clifton Powell, Eva Marcille, Cynthia Bailey, Darrin Dewitt Henson, Erica Peeples, Angela White, David Banner, DreamDoll, and Stephen Cofield Jr. alongside original cast. It was renamed to Surviving Sasha and aired as a six-episode series on Tubi.
