= Jordan L. Jones =

American TV and film actor

- Born: Jordan L. Jones; Texas, United States
- Education: University of Southern California
- Occupations: Actor; writer; producer
- Years active: 2017–present
- Mother: Ptosha Storey

Jordan L. Jones is an American actor. He began his career as a production assistant on the television series Home & Family, later signing with Main Title Entertainment to resume acting. He portrays Jazz on Peacock's modern-day reinterpretation, Bel-Air (2017), Snowfall (2017) and Rel (2018).

== Early life and education ==
Jordan L. Jones was born in Dallas, Texas, to Ptosha Storey. His mother is an African-American actress and director. He attended Brentwood High School and took up acting at a young age after his mother succeeded in getting him into some play. He made his first screen appearance on television in the advertisement for Sports Authority during the Super Bowl commercial that featured Michael Strahan and Adrian Peterson. He then went on to join the University of Arizona and later transferred to the University of Southern California (USC), where he pursued acting and completed his education in 2016. After completion of his studies, Jones worked as a production assistant on the TV show Home & Family and later signed with manager Tracy Steinsapir of Main Title Entertainment.

== Career ==
Jones made his on-screen debut in 2017 with a guest appearance in the CBS drama series Wisdom of the Crowd. That same year he took on small guest roles in Future Man and NCIS: Los Angeles before landing a recurring part in the Netflix comedy Disjointed.

In February 2018, Deadline Hollywood reported that Jones had been cast in a lead role opposite Lil Rel Howery in the Fox comedy pilot Rel, executive produced by Jerrod Carmichael. The series, co-written and co-created by Howery and inspired by events in his own life, cast Jones as Nat, Rel's younger brother, a recently released ex-convict trying to rebuild his life on Chicago's West Side. Jones starred as Nat in American television sitcom Rel appeared in all twelve episodes. After the show was canceled Jones continued taking guest roles in several television productions, including the FX drama Snowfall, the Showtime series Shameless, and The Rookie on ABC.

In 2022, Jones was cast as Jazz in Peacock's reimagining of the NBC sitcom The Fresh Prince of Bel-Air, titled Bel-Air. In the original series the character of Jazz was played by DJ Jazzy Jeff; the reboot repositioned him as Will's closest friend from Inglewood who runs his uncle's record shop. Jones told Screen Rant that he drew heavily from his own upbringing in Inglewood when developing the role. Jones told Okayplayer that DJ Jazzy Jeff himself approved of the portrayal, saying Jeff told him he had made his family proud.

== Personal life ==
Jones is a Christian and has spoken about his faith as an important part of his life and career. Outside acting, he plays video games and streames games like Call of Duty, Madden, NCAA, and NBA 2K on Twitch.

== Filmography ==
=== Film ===
Year	Title	Role	Notes
2019	South Central Love	Meech	
2020	Mainstream	Bar Patron	

=== Short films ===
Year	Title	Role	Notes
2018	NiGHTS	Sidney	
2018	THE COMMiTMENT: Kayvon Thibodeaux	Fan	

=== Television ===
Year	Title	Role	Notes
2017	Wisdom of the Crowd	Darius	Episode: "In the Wild"
2017	NCIS: Los Angeles	Brady	1 episode
2017	Future Man	Ticket Taker	1 episode
2017–2019	Snowfall	Bo	1 episode
2018	Disjointed	Stoned Kid #3	3 episodes
2018–2019	Rel	Nat / Offset	12 episodes; main cast
2019	Shameless	Crackhead	Episode: "A Little Gallagher Goes a Long Way"
2020	The Rookie	Tucker Novak	1 episode
2021	All Rise	Frank Laughlin	1 episode
2022–2025	Bel-Air	Jazz	Main cast; seasons 1–4
2026	R.J Decker	Stevie Marsh	1 episode

=== Music videos ===
Year	Title	Artist	Notes
2018	"Got Friends"	GoldLink feat. Miguel	
