= Atlanta Exes =

- Genre: Reality television
- Based on: Hollywood Exes
- Starring: Tameka Raymond; Christina Johnson; Monyetta Shaw; Sheree Buchanan; Torrei Hart
- Country of origin: United States
- Original language: English
- No. of seasons: 1
- No. of episodes: 8

Production
- Executive producers: Pam Healey; Lisa Shannon; Sean Rankine; Elizabeth Voorhees; Vernon Lynch; Jeff Dyson; Susan Levison; Jill Holmes; Fernando Mills; Laurel Stier
- Camera setup: Multiple
- Production companies: Shed Media US; Lynch-Dyson Entertainment

Original release
- Network: VH1
- Release: August 18 – September 29, 2014

Related
- Hollywood Exes

Atlanta Exes is an American reality documentary television series on VH1 that premiered on August 18, 2014. The show is a spin-off of the series Hollywood Exes based in Atlanta, Georgia. The show follows lives of several women who have been previously married to famous men.

== Cast ==
- Tameka Raymond, ex-wife of Usher
- Christina Johnson, ex-wife of CeeLo Green
- Monyetta Shaw, ex-fiancée of Ne-Yo
- Sheree Buchanan, ex-wife of Ray Buchanan
- Torrei Hart, ex-wife of Kevin Hart

== Episodes ==
No.	Title	Original release date	U.S. viewers (millions)
1	"Episode 1"	August 18, 2014	2.27
Tameka Raymond is moving out of the home she shared with her ex-husband, Usher, and hosts a "packing party" while Torrei Hart joins the group.
2	"Episode 2"	August 18, 2014	1.68
Sheree finds out that Tameka has been talking about her behind her back and Torrei decides to take Tameka to the mat about it!
3	"Episode 3"	August 25, 2014	1.93
Christina tries to bring the group back together and smooth things over but when the ladies meet for lunch, the conversation takes a turn to the left and insults fly!
4	"Episode 4"	September 1, 2014	1.91
Christina and Monyetta arrange a trip to a cabin where the ladies meet with a mediator and hash out their problems.
5	"Episode 5"	September 8, 2014	1.51
Torrei invites the ladies down to the Cayman Islands for the week and while there Sheree talks to Christina about why she broke up with Willie.
6	"Episode 6"	September 15, 2014	1.61
In a heartbreaking and heartwarming episode, Sheree asks Torrei to help her find the father she hasn't spoken to in 15 years. The two take a road trip to South Georgia to look for Sheree's father.
7	"Episode 7"	September 22, 2014	1.43
Monyetta hosts a charity event and honors Christina for her work overcoming an abusive relationship. Tameka meets with Sheree and Monica and starts stirring up drama regarding Sheree past.
8	"Episode 8"	September 29, 2014	1.48
Tameka hosts a 5K race in honor of her late son, Kile Glover, but after recent drama, Sheree decides to snub the event. Sheree and her daughter Destinee are throwing a joint birthday party, which quickly erupts into a verbal altercation between Torrei and Monica about loyalty.
