= Kevin Barnett (comedian) =

American actor and comedian (1986–2019)

Kevin Barnett (August 7, 1986 – January 22, 2019) was an American stand-up comedian and actor. Barnett was the co-creator of Rel, a sitcom starring Lil Rel Howery that debuted on Fox in September 2018. Barnett was also a writer on Comedy Central's Broad City and The Carmichael Show. Barnett started his career on MTV's Guy Code before becoming a co-creator of the sketch comedy show Friends of the People. He was also featured in the Mike Birbiglia film Sleepwalk with Me. Barnett was also an original member of the Round Table of Gentlemen, a comedy podcast featuring the founders of the Last Podcast Network. Barnett died unexpectedly of non-traumatic pancreatitis at the age of 32 while on a vacation. Tributes poured out in his memory across the comedy world.
