= Keenen Ivory Wayans =

American actor, comedian, and filmmaker (born 1958)

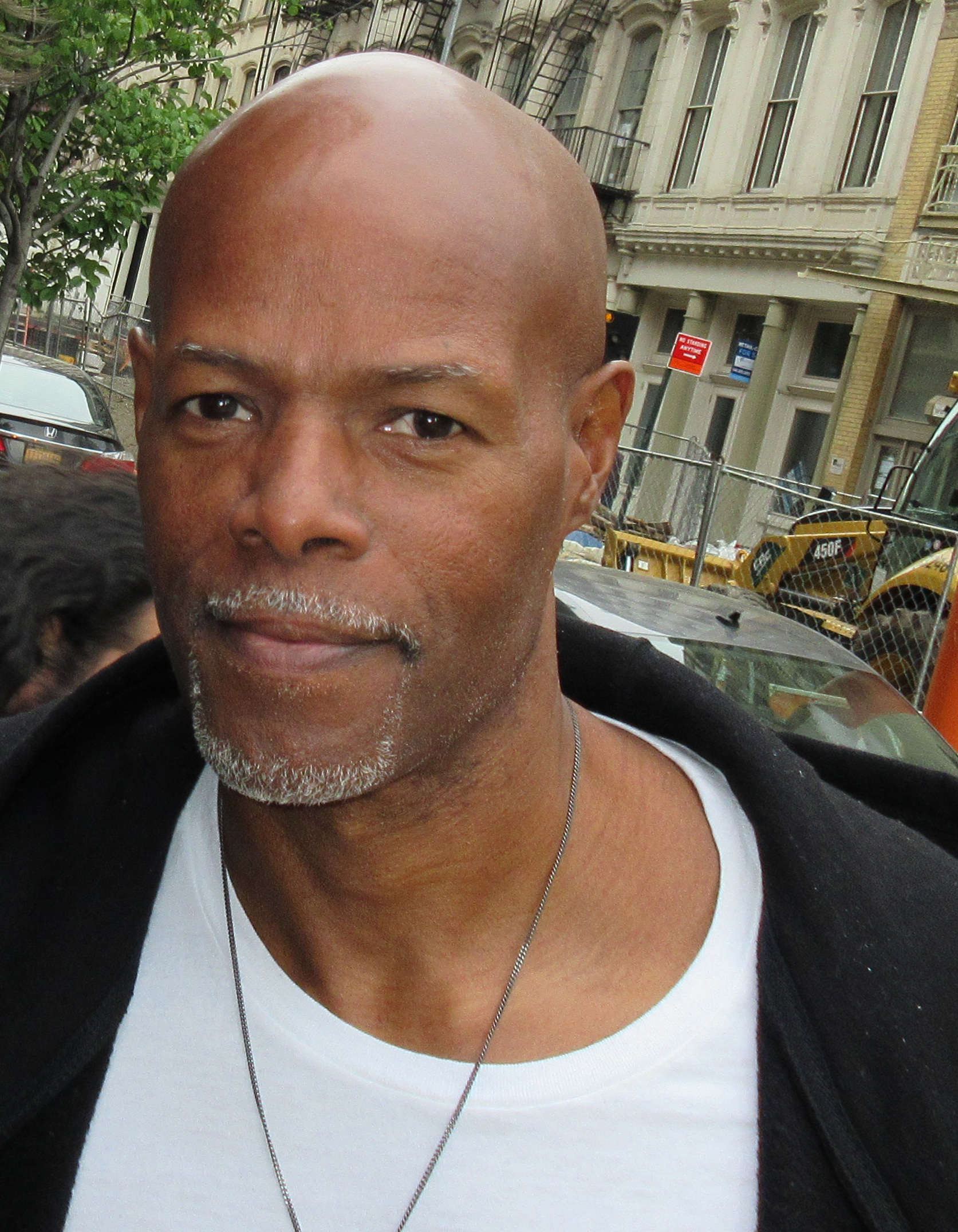
- Wayans in 2019
- Born: Keenen Ivory Desuma Wayans; June 8, 1958 (age 68); New York City, U.S.
- Occupations: Actor; comedian; filmmaker
- Years active: 1979–present
- Notable work: In Living Color; I'm Gonna Git You Sucka
- Spouse: Daphne Wayans (m. 2001; div. 2006)
- Partner: Brittany Daniel (2007–2014)
- Children: 5
- Relatives: Dwayne Wayans (brother); Damon Wayans (brother); Kim Wayans (sister); Shawn Wayans (brother); Marlon Wayans (brother); Damon Wayans Jr. (nephew)
- Family: Wayans family
- Awards: 1990–Emmy Award Outstanding Variety, Music or Comedy Series; In Living Color (as executive producer)

Keenen Ivory Desuma Wayans (/ˈweɪ.ənz/ WAY-ənz; born June 8, 1958) is an American actor, comedian, and filmmaker. He is a member of the Wayans family of entertainers. Wayans first came to prominence as the host and creator of the 1990–1994 Fox sketch comedy series In Living Color. He has produced, directed or written several films, starting with Hollywood Shuffle, which he cowrote, in 1987. Most of his films have included him and one or more of his siblings in the cast.

One of these films, Scary Movie (2000), which Wayans directed, was the highest-grossing movie directed by an African American until it was surpassed by Tim Story's Fantastic Four in 2005. From 1997 to 1998, he hosted the talk show The Keenen Ivory Wayans Show. In 2014, he was a judge for the eighth season of Last Comic Standing.

== Early life ==
Wayans was born in Harlem, New York City, the second child of ten of Elvira Alethia (née Green; July 23, 1938–July 10, 2020), a homemaker and social worker, and Howell Stouten Wayans (August 26, 1936–April 1, 2023) a supermarket manager. Genealogical TV show Finding Your Roots revealed that his paternal line traced back to Madagascar. His father was a devout Jehovah's Witness. The family later moved to Manhattan's Fulton housing projects, where he primarily grew up. He attended Seward Park High School during his teenage years, and attended Tuskegee University on an engineering scholarship where he was initiated as a member of Alpha Phi Alpha fraternity's Gamma Phi chapter. He entertained his friends at college with made-up stories about life in New York. One semester before graduation, he dropped out of school to focus on comedy.

== Career ==
During his first set performing at The Improv in New York, Wayans met Robert Townsend, who helped him learn about the comedy business. Townsend and Wayans drove to Los Angeles together when Wayans moved to Los Angeles in 1980. Wayans worked there as an actor. He had a regular role as a soldier on the television series For Love and Honor and appeared on Hill Street Blues as an NFL wide receiver.

Townsend wrote, directed, and starred in the 1987 movie Hollywood Shuffle; Wayans was costar and cowriter. The movie's success allowed him to raise the money to make I'm Gonna Git You Sucka. Fox Broadcasting Company approached Wayans to offer him his own show. Wayans wanted to produce a variety show similar to Saturday Night Live, with a cast of people of color that took chances with its content.

Fox gave Wayans a lot of freedom with the show, although Fox executives were a bit concerned about the show's content before its debut. Wayans created, wrote, and starred in the show, In Living Color, a sketch comedy television series that originally ran on Fox from 1990 to 1994.

== In Living Color ==
=== Characters ===
- Death Row Comic (Prison Cable Access)
- Frenchie
- Ice Man (Homeboy Shopping Network)
- Tom Brothers (The Brothers Brothers)
- Wes (Wes & Les)

=== Impressions ===
- Arsenio Hall
- Billy Dee Williams
- Don Cornelius
- Jesse Jackson
- Little Richard
- Mike Tyson
- Marsha Warfield
- Milli (Rob Pilatus) of Milli Vanilli
- Morgan Freeman (Damon Wayans was Hoke Coburn from Driving Miss Daisy/Riding Miss Daisy, Principal Joe Louis Clark from Lean on Me)
- Rick James
- Steve Harvey
- Carl Weathers (as Apollo Creed)

== Personal life ==
Wayans married Daphne Polk in 2001, but the couple filed for divorce in 2004, and their divorce was finalized in December 2006. He dated actress Brittany Daniel from 2007 to 2014.

== Filmography ==
=== Film ===
Year	Title	Director	Writer	Producer
1987	Hollywood Shuffle	No	Yes	No
1987	Eddie Murphy Raw	No	Yes	Yes
1988	I'm Gonna Git You Sucka	Yes	Yes	No
1991	The Five Heartbeats	No	Yes	No
1994	A Low Down Dirty Shame	Yes	Yes	No
1996	Don't Be a Menace to South Central While Drinking Your Juice in the Hood	Uncredited	No	Yes
1997	Most Wanted	No	Yes	Executive
2000	Scary Movie	Yes	No	Uncredited
2001	Scary Movie 2	Yes	No	No
2004	White Chicks	Yes	Yes	Yes
2006	Little Man	Yes	Yes	Yes
2009	Dance Flick	No	Yes	Yes
2026	Scary Movie	No	Yes	Yes

Acting roles

Year	Title	Role	Notes
1983	Star 80	Comic	
1987	Hollywood Shuffle	Donald / Jheri Curl	
1988	I'm Gonna Git You Sucka	Jack Spade	
1994	A Low Down Dirty Shame	Andre Shame	
1996	Don't Be a Menace to South Central While Drinking Your Juice in the Hood	Mailman	
1996	The Glimmer Man	Lieutenant Jim Campbell	
1997	Most Wanted	Gunnery Sergeant James Anthony Dunn	
2000	Scary Movie	Slave	
2009	Dance Flick	Mr. Stache	

=== Television ===
Year	Title	Director	Writer	Producer	Creator	Notes
1990–1992	In Living Color	Yes	Yes	Executive	Yes	
1990	Hammer, Slammer, & Slade	No	Yes	Executive	Yes	Unaired pilot
1997	The Keenen Ivory Wayans Show	No	No	Executive	No	
2012	In Living Color	Yes	Yes	Executive	Yes	Unaired TV special
2017	The Boo Crew	No	Yes	Yes	Yes	
2020	The Last O.G.	No	Yes	No	No	8 episodes

Acting roles

Year	Title	Role	Notes
1981	An Evening at the Improv	Himself	Episode: "Episode #2.16"
1982	Cheers	Customer #1	Episode: "Sam's Women"
1982	CHiPs	Roberts	Episode: "Meet the New Guy"
1983	The Renegades	Lloyd Wayne	Episode: "Back to School"
1983	For Love and Honor	Pvt. Duke Johnson	Television film
1983–1984	For Love and Honor	Pvt. Duke Johnson	Main cast
1986	Benson	Clete Hawkins	Episode: "Summer of Discontent"
1987	Hill Street Blues	Raymond Jackson	Episode: "The Runner Falls on His Kisser"
1987	A Different World	Professor Lawrence	Episode: "War of the Words"
1990–1993	In Living Color	Himself	Main host (season 1–4)
1991	American Music Awards	Himself	Main host
1997–1998	The Keenen Ivory Wayans Show	Himself	Main host
1998	Viva Variety	Himself	Episode: "Episode #3.7"
2001	My Wife and Kids	Ken	Episode: "A Little Romance"
2012	In Living Color	Himself	Host; unaired TV special
2013	Happily Divorced	Tony	Episode: "The Biggest Chill"
2013	Real Husbands of Hollywood	Himself	Episode: "Tisha & Duane"
2014–2015	Last Comic Standing	Himself	Main judge (season 8–9)
2018	The History of Comedy	Himself	Recurring guest (season 2)
2020	This Is Stand-Up	Himself	Episode: "Episode #1.2"
