= Rel (TV series) =

American television sitcom

- Genre: Sitcom
- Created by: Lil Rel Howery; Kevin Barnett; Josh Rabinowitz
- Directed by: Gerry Cohen; Mike Scully ("Kids First Visit")
- Starring: Lil Rel Howery; Jordan L. Jones; Jessica Moore; Sinbad
- Music by: Derryck 'Big Tank' Thornton (pilot episode); Peter Cottontale; Siddhartha Khosla; Jeff Garber
- Opening theme: "In the Circle" by Crucial Conflict
- Country of origin: United States
- Original language: English
- No. of seasons: 1
- No. of episodes: 12

Production
- Executive producers: Josh Rabinowitz; Kevin Barnett; Jerrod Carmichael; Lil Rel Howery; Mike Scully; Gerry Cohen
- Cinematography: George Mooradian
- Editor: Richard Candib
- Camera setup: Multi-camera
- Running time: 21–23 minutes
- Production companies: Morningside Entertainment; REL Event Productions; Scully Productions; Josh, Make Me Laugh Game; Bird Luger; 20th Century Fox Television

Original release
- Network: Fox
- Release: September 9, 2018 – January 13, 2019

Rel is an American television sitcom created by Lil Rel Howery and Kevin Barnett for the Fox Broadcasting Company. The series also stars Jordan L. Jones, Jess Hilarious and Sinbad. Loosely based on Howery's own life, it follows a Chicago man trying to rebuild his life after his ex-wife slept with his barber.

Rel is a joint production by Morningside Entertainment, REL Event Productions, Scully Productions, JMMLG, Bird Luger, and 20th Century Fox Television and syndicated by 20th Television. On April 17, 2019, Fox canceled the series after one season.

== Plot summary ==
The series centers on Rel, a nurse living on the West Side of Chicago, whose life is soon disrupted when his wife is having an affair with his own barber and divorces him.

== Cast ==
- Lil Rel Howery as Rel, a nurse who tries to rebuild his life after the divorce
- Jordan L. Jones as Nat, Rel's younger brother who just got out of jail
- Jess Hilarious as Brittany, Rel's best friend
- Sinbad as Milton, Rel's and Nat's widowed father
- Leah Sava Jeffries as Brandi
- D.C. Young Fly as Jaymo

== Episodes ==
No.	Title	Directed by	Written by	Original release date	Prod. code	U.S. viewers (millions)
1	"Pilot"	Gerry Cohen	Lil Rel Howery & Kevin Barnett & Josh Rabinowitz	September 9, 2018 (Note: The pilot episode was released early on September 6, 2018.)	1LBH01	5.49
2	"Laundry Room"	Gerry Cohen	Lil Rel Howery & Kevin Barnett & Josh Rabinowitz	September 30, 2018	1LBH02	1.99
3	"Kids First Visit"	Mike Scully	Story by : Lil Rel Howery; Teleplay by : Mike Scully	October 7, 2018	1LBH04	1.81
4	"One Night Stand"	Gerry Cohen	Story by : Lil Rel Howery; Teleplay by : Aeysha Carr	October 14, 2018	1LBH03	1.40
5	"Halloween"	Gerry Cohen	Aeysha Carr & Hugh Moore	October 21, 2018	1LBH05	1.45
6	"Windy City Politics"	Gerry Cohen	Danielle Sanchez-Witzel	November 4, 2018	1LBH06	1.64
7	"Re-Enter the Dragons"	Gerry Cohen	Andrew Lee	November 11, 2018	1LBH07	1.25
8	"Blizzard"	Gerry Cohen	Josh Rabinowitz & Kevin Barnett	November 18, 2018	1LBH08	1.62
9	"Brittany's Mom"	Gerry Cohen	Rae Sanni	December 2, 2018	1LBH09	1.61
10	"Hate & Hip Hop"	Gerry Cohen	Josh Rabinowitz & Kevin Barnett	December 9, 2018	1LBH10	2.06
11	"Mom"	Gerry Cohen	Story by : Lil Rel Howery & James Heller Chapman; Teleplay by : Willie Hunter & Dave Helem	January 6, 2019	1LBH12	1.23
12	"Cleveland"	Gerry Cohen	Mike Mariano	January 13, 2019	1LBH11	2.77

== Kevin Barnett ==
Co-creator Kevin Barnett, who also worked on the show Broad City died at the age of 32 on January 22, 2019. His death in Tijuana, Baja California, Mexico, while he was on vacation, was caused by pancreatitis. Barnett co-hosted a podcast, Roundtable of Gentlemen.

== Reception ==
=== Critical response ===
On the review aggregation website Rotten Tomatoes, the series holds a 44% approval rating with an average rating of 4.36 out of 10, based on 16 reviews. The website's critical consensus reads, "Rel has a talented star supported by a solid ensemble, but none of it's enough to disguise an ordinary sitcom that hits a series of generic beats." Metacritic, which uses a weighted average, assigned a score of 46 out of 100 based on 6 critics, indicating "mixed or average reviews".

=== Ratings ===
Viewership and ratings per episode of Rel
No.	Title	Air date	Rating/share (18–49)	Viewers (millions)	DVR (18–49)	DVR viewers (millions)	Total (18–49)	Total viewers (millions)
1	"Pilot"	September 9, 2018	1.9/8	5.49	0.2	0.42	2.1	5.91
2	"Laundry Room"	September 30, 2018	0.8/4	1.99	0.3	0.59	1.0	2.58
3	"Kids First Visit"	October 7, 2018	0.7/3	1.81	0.2	0.54	0.9	2.35
4	"One Night Stand"	October 14, 2018	0.5/2	1.40	0.2	0.49	0.7	1.88
5	"Halloween"	October 21, 2018	0.6/3	1.45	0.2	0.43	0.8	1.88
6	"Windy City Politics"	November 4, 2018	0.6/3	1.64	0.2	0.41	0.8	2.05
7	"Re-Enter the Dragons"	November 11, 2018	0.5/2	1.25	0.2	0.40	0.7	1.65
8	"Blizzard"	November 18, 2018	0.6/3	1.62	0.2	0.37	0.8	1.99
9	"Brittany's Mom"	December 2, 2018	0.6/3	1.61	0.2	0.37	0.8	1.99
10	"Hate & Hip Hop"	December 9, 2018	0.8/3	2.06	TBD	TBD	TBD	TBD
11	"Mom"	January 6, 2019	0.5/2	1.23	0.1	0.30	0.6	1.53
12	"Cleveland"	January 13, 2019	1.0/4	2.77	TBD	TBD	TBD	TBD
