= Here with Me (Arika Kane song) =

Single by Arika Kane

from the album Arika Kane
- Released: 2010
- Genre: R&B
- Length: 4:07
- Label: BSE
- Songwriters: Arika Kane, Lou Humphrey, Carey Mellers
- Producers: Arika Kane, Lou Humphrey, Carey Mellers

"Here with Me" is an R&B song by American singer-songwriter Arika Kane, released as a single from her eponymous debut studio album, Arika Kane (2010). "Here with Me" was written and produced by Arika Kane, Lou Humphrey and Carey Mellers. It spent four weeks on the Billboard R&B/Hip-Hop Songs chart and peaked at number sixty-nine.

== Track listing ==
Digital download

1. "Here With Me" – 4:07
2. "Ring My Bell" (Radio) – 4:40
3. "Ring My Bell" (House) – 3:52
4. "Ring My Bell" (House Extended) – 7:24
5. "Ring My Bell" (Instrumental) – 7:19
6. "Ring My Bell" (Acapella) – 4:48

== Charts ==
Chart (2010)	Peak position
US Hot R&B/Hip-Hop Songs (Billboard)	69

== Release history ==
Region	Date	Format	Label
United States	January 11, 2011	Digital download	Big Score Entertainment
