= Salzgeber =

Salzgeber is a German-Swiss surname that translates to 'Salt giver'. Notable people with the surname include:

- Daniel Salzgeber (born 1992), Liechtenstein footballer and politician
- Manfred Salzgeber (1943–1994), German actor
- Rainer Salzgeber (born 1967), Austrian alpine skier
- Ulla Salzgeber (born 1958), German dressage rider
