= List of Disney's Big Hero 6 characters =

The following is a list of fictional characters from Walt Disney Animation Studios 2014 feature film adaptation of Big Hero 6, as well as its follow-up television shows Big Hero 6: The Series and Baymax! and its subsequent comic book adaptation through IDW Publishing, based on characters created by Steven T. Seagle and Duncan Rouleau (credited to Man of Action) and published by Marvel Comics.

While the titular characters originated from Marvel Comics, their characterizations and supporting cast were newly invented by Disney, making their appearance a radical departure from the source material.

== Film introductions ==
=== Hiro Hamada ===
Hiro Hamada (voiced by Ryan Potter) is a 14-year-old technology prodigy who initially planned to use his mental brilliance to con others through back alley bot fighting. Through the advice and swaying of his older brother Tadashi, Hiro decided to join the San Fransokyo Institute of Technology and put his brain to work. However, tragedy struck when Tadashi perished in a fire. From this, Hiro decided to use his smarts to form a team with his friends and lead Big Hero 6.

Hiro is loosely based on Hiro Takachiho.

=== Baymax ===
Baymax (voiced by Scott Adsit) is an inflatable healthcare robot invented by Tadashi Hamada. Baymax's sole function has been to help people not just physically, but mentally and emotionally as well. After Tadashi's death, Baymax felt that his purpose was now to help Tadashi's younger brother Hiro. Equipped with "10,000 different medical procedures" and various forms of martial arts, but a loose grasp of common sense, Baymax does all he can to rescue people in more ways than one.

Baymax is loosely based on the character of the same name.

=== Honey Lemon ===
Honey Lemon (voiced by Genesis Rodriguez) is a chemist who enjoys what she does. While somewhat maniacal and eccentric, she deeply cares for her friends and does everything she can to bring optimism to the group. She does not necessarily think violence is the answer to everything, but she will throw herself into the fight when needed.

Honey Lemon is loosely based on Aiko Miyazaki.

=== Go Go Tomago ===
Ethel "Go Go" Tomago (voiced by Jamie Chung) is a sarcastic adrenaline junkie who prefers working with electromagnets. She is a team player. When fighting, she comes off as the most experienced due to her background but prefers to fight alongside her team.

Go Go is loosely based on Leiko Tanaka.

=== Wasabi ===
Wasabi (voiced by Damon Wayans Jr. in the film, Khary Payton in other forms of media) is an expert in laser technology but is an OCD neat freak who prefers to have systems and order in favor of chaos and spontaneity. While he is cowardly, he pulls through for his friends and occasionally shows a flare for the heroic life much to everyone's and his shock.

Wasabi is loosely based on Wasabi-No-Ginger.

=== Fred ===
Frederick Flamarian "Fred" Frederickson IV (voiced by T.J. Miller in the film and Kingdom Hearts III, Brooks Wheelan in the series) is a total comic book nerd who, despite being the son of a billionaire, spends his time as a sign-flipping school mascot who is a "science enthusiast". Armed with a kaiju costume dubbed "Fredzilla" and his knowledge of comic book lore, his antics amuse, annoy and aid his friends on the team.

Fred is loosely based on the character of the same name.

=== Tadashi Hamada ===
Tadashi Hamada (voiced by Daniel Henney) was the elder brother to Hiro and, just like him, displayed a knack for understanding and building various forms of technology. He invented Baymax for the sole purpose of helping people, but was unable to see this to fruition due to his early death. Said death sets in motion a series of events that would lead to Big Hero 6's formation.

=== Aunt Cass ===
Aunt Cass
- First appearance: Big Hero 6 (2014)
- Created by: Don Hall; Jordan Roberts; Robert L. Baird; Dan Gerson
- Voiced by: Maya Rudolph
- Species: Human
- Gender: Female

Aunt Cass (voiced by Maya Rudolph) is Hiro and Tadashi's aunt and guardian and owner of the Lucky Cat Café who was granted custody of them after the death of her younger sister and brother-in-law. Cass continued to care and love them as if they were her children though like any other parent, she would feel concern and anger whenever they got into any trouble. She bailed them out of jail after an incident involving both fighting and regretted the fact that she never picked up a book on parenting. She is present when Hiro presents his microbots at the SFIT showcase and expresses joy at seeing him succeed. Cass plans on an after-party for her nephews and friends, but Tadashi is killed in a fire, devastating her and Hiro. Weeks later, Cass tries to cheer Hiro up and get him out of the house, leading to a series of events involving Hiro, Baymax, and his friends becoming Big Hero 6, all while Cass remains blissfully unaware. Hiro eventually begins attending SFIT much to Cass' happiness and support.

The television series expands on her character, depicting her as not only being unaware of her nephew's heroics but also displaying some eccentricities when it comes to cooking and food. This is further shown in the episode "Food Fight" where she not only is shown mastering many uncommon dishes with a variety of unfamiliar ingredients but she is shown to love doing so to challenge herself. Cass also displays a ditsy personality that sometimes hinges on ignorance. Though once she does become aware she takes her situation seriously. She also has never dated or gotten married before the events of "Aunt Cass Goes Out" and while she did find Alistair Krei interesting and romantic, she ultimately saw his flaws enough for her to dump him. In season two, she starts dating Chief Diego Cruz, whom she had known since high school. It is later implied that the relationship does not last. In season three, she displays some athletic ability; revealing that she used to play softball when she was in college, and is also very good at singing.

Despite being Hiro's aunt, she acts more like a mother; setting him up to have a date with a girl his age and taking pictures of them when they are going to a dance. She is also shown to be heavily oblivious to major events happening throughout the city, usually due to Hiro and his friends stopping her from seeing anything major happening. At the end of the series, she adopts Noodle Burger Boy and his robot family as her staff. They in turn, affectionately call her "mom", which she admits is weird.

In Baymax!, Cass confides in the titular robot that her attachment to the café is the result of her fearing the loss of her family, as the customers are like family members to her and she is afraid of them leaving her for another establishment. She adds that she "made a promise" to look after her family; implying that she took over the café from Hiro and Tadashi's parents.

=== Alistair Krei ===
Alistair Krei
- First appearance: Big Hero 6 (2014)
- Created by: Don Hall; Jordan Roberts; Robert L. Baird; Dan Gerson
- Voiced by: Alan Tudyk
- Age: 44
- Gender: Male

Alistair Krei (voiced by Alan Tudyk) is the self-made CEO of Krei Tech. Considered an influential man, Krei is always searching for the next best thing and found it in Hiro Hamada's microbots at SFIT. He is heavily impressed with Hiro's microbot project and asks that his tech be bought by his company, but he is turned down after a stern talking to Professor Robert Callaghan with whom he had a rough past. It is soon revealed that Krei had helped develop a special teleportation device for the government of which Callaghan's daughter, Abigail, was a test pilot. The test went wrong and Abigail was thought lost somewhere in the unknown and since then Krei has been blamed. Despite this, he has continued in his illustrious career as if nothing happened revealing a morally dubious side. Krei is soon attacked by a vengeful Callaghan but is rescued by Hiro and his friends who become the Big Hero 6 superhero team. After Callaghan's defeat and Abigail's rescue, Krei went back to business now somewhat more aware of his actions.

The series continues to display his morally ambiguous personality. While not evil, he is manipulative and seems to hold absolutely no concern for anything. He outright decides to copy Hiro's microbot transmitter, something his assistant outright confirms and rushes production on a defense drone that he failed to run diagnostic checks on. When he realizes this, he demands that the Big Hero 6 fix the problem or else he will blow their identities. He presents a charming facade when he meets Hiro's Aunt Cass whom she falls for, but after revealing his true self, even she finds him despicable. While he considers the Big Hero 6 as allies, he prefers that they not visit him often as shown in "Killer App" where after explaining the original plans for Noodle Burger Boy to them, he politely, yet hurriedly, told them to leave. He initially held a minor grudge against Globby for stealing his wallet, but later hires him to be a spokesperson. He accepts Hiro as an intern at his company to compete with Liv Amara whom he has a one-sided rivalry with.

In "Muira-Horror!", Krei finally reveals an honorable, sentimental, and even intuitive side. He reveals that when he was a child he did not have any friends, so when he went to summer camp he would train himself to know the wilds as much as possible, making him surprisingly knowledgeable about nature. He also jumped into action when Go Go was in trouble, something that surprised her and Hiro. He initially disliked Christmas due to not being able to celebrate it while at boarding school, but immediately changed his mind after Hiro had Baymax dress up as Santa for him. He also wanted to have a bunny when he was younger, but his parents forbade him to have any "weak" pets. Despite constantly covering for Big Hero 6, he works with Chief Cruz in trying to capture the team. It was later revealed that he was taken advantage of by Trina. Following the closing of Sycorax, Krei purchases the building, presumably out of spite.

=== Yokai ===
Yokai
- First appearance: Big Hero 6 (2014)
- Created by: Don Hall; Jordan Roberts; Robert L. Baird; Dan Gerson
- Voiced by: James Cromwell
- Full name: Professor Robert Callaghan
- Gender: Male

Yokai (voiced by James Cromwell) is a supervillain and the identity of Robert Callaghan who was once a kind and respectable professor and dean at SFIT. Coming from a military background, Professor Robert Callaghan is a pioneer in developing many cutting-edge tech inventions including the Callaghan-Catmull Spline. He had a daughter that he loved dearly named Abigail who grew up to become a test pilot for Krei Tech. When a teleportation accident left her test pod lost in an abyss, Callaghan angrily blamed Krei and swore revenge. He taught many students at SFIT and met Hiro Hamada, the younger brother of his star student Tadashi. Callaghan was impressed with Hiro's invention: Microbots that are controlled by a neuro-transmitter. Seeing this as an opportunity to get back at Krei, Callaghan seemingly started a fire and stole Hiro's microbots, but unintentionally killed Tadashi. Nevertheless, he continued his quest under the name Yokai and stole many parts to recreate the teleportation machine to destroy Krei Tech's new building and Krei himself. He is thwarted by the arrival of the Big Hero 6 who manage to stop him and can retrieve Abigail from the portal. When Callaghan is carted away by police, he sees his still-living daughter being tended to and shows shame for his actions.

Callaghan returns in the Big Hero 6: The Series episode "Mini-Max", where he is serving a life sentence without parole. He reveals that he has worked with Professor Granville when she was a teacher at SFIT and that she had initially resigned due to an accident. Callaghan admits that he is very remorseful of his actions, especially towards causing the death of Tadashi, and that he understands that his apology is not enough for Hiro to forgive him. Callaghan briefly returns in "Hiro the Villain", where Chief Cruz interviews him about Big Hero 6. Callaghan defends them and warns him that his belief of considering them criminals is wrong.

=== Mr. Yama ===
Mr. Yama
- First appearance: Big Hero 6 (2014)
- Created by: Don Hall; Jordan Roberts; Robert L. Baird; Dan Gerson
- Voiced by: Paul Briggs
- Gender: Male

Mr. Yama (voiced by Paul Briggs) is a notorious Japanese gangster who runs much of the underground illegal activities in San Fransokyo which includes bot fighting. He owns his own bot dubbed "Little Yama" which he prides himself on using due to its violent attacks. However, he is outsmarted by Hiro Hamada whose simpler bot managed to overpower and destroy his own. Not wanting to be outdone, Yama asked his men to "teach [Hiro] a lesson". He gives chase when Hiro is rescued by Tadashi, but after the whole commotion, Yama, Hiro, Tadashi as well as everyone participating in the illegal bot fighting are arrested.

Sometime later, he got out of prison and has gone back to doing illegal work. In the premiere episode of Big Hero 6: The Series, "Baymax Returns", Yama has started to work for the mysterious Obake of whom he himself is afraid of. The series further shows that despite his large overweight appearance, he does display some technical know-how as he was able to replicate and mass-produce Baymax's skeleton after having him for a limited amount of time. He is nevertheless defeated by Hiro once again along with his friends. Yama is also shown to not be very good at working with or controlling others such as in "Food Fight" he was easily outsmarted by Momakase who paralyzed and stole back a device she initially stole for him. In "Small Hiro One", Yama is also revealed to have a giant variant of Little Yama called "Mega Yama" which he had attempted to upgrade. In that same episode, he is shown to be unaware that Hiro and his Big Hero 6 alter ego are one and the same.

== Television introductions ==
=== Professor Granville ===
Professor Granville
- First appearance: Big Hero 6: The Series "Baymax Returns" (2017)
- Created by: Sharon Flynn; Paiman Kalayeh
- Voiced by: Jenifer Lewis
- Gender: Female

Professor Grace Granville (voiced by Jenifer Lewis) is the new dean of SFIT after Professor Callaghan is arrested. Granville came to replacing him the day Hiro started his first day at school. Despite finding Hiro unfocused and selfish, she saw great potential in him due to being related to Tadashi whom she found to be an exceptional student. She continued to question Hiro's motivations and is shown to dislike direct physical contact with people. Later on, she realizes how important it was for Hiro to remember his brother and opted to give him his lab in the hopes that it will keep him focused. Granville shows concern for all if not most of her students including the envious Karmi. Granville gave off the impression that Hiro needed to socialize more and paired him up with Karmi, seemingly unaware of the fact that she disliked Hiro. However, it becomes apparent that Granville intended for Karmi to take a lesson from their brief gathering implying that she is well aware of her moody personality. When Hiro attempted to give up on a project, Granville refused for him to quit, showing that despite her prior perceptions of him, she still considers him a genius. Granville has shown a comically eccentric side as well. In "Rivalry Weak", she is shown to take the pranks between SFIT and San Fransokyo Art Institute seriously by forcing Wasabi and Fred to act as guards to the cafe, which is the source of SFAI's pranking.

It is revealed in "Small Hiro One" that she had taught at SFIT twenty years prior, something that she had apparently never brought up to Hiro with some of her students including Trevor Trengrove and Wendy Wower. "Mini-Max" and "Countdown to Catastrophe" reveal Granville was also a mentor to Bob Aken (Obake) whom she considered enough of a genius to give him free rein in his research. But Aken injured himself as a result in an accident caused by his research, with Granville taking the fall while resigning. She returned years later, but with the intent of keeping her students under control as she feels that "students need limits, even geniuses" while attempting not to make the same mistake with Hiro. She is later comforted by the fact that Hiro is genuinely a good person. Evidently, it is revealed that she is well aware of Hiro and his friends' efforts as Big Hero 6.

In season two, she begins taking a mentor like role and in "The Present" showed a very nurturing side when she comforted Hiro on his first Christmas without Tadashi. In season three, it is revealed that Granville owns three dogs, all of whom have varying needs. She also possesses a powerful singing voice.

=== Obake ===
Obake
- First appearance: Big Hero 6: The Series "Baymax Returns" (2017)
- Last appearance: Big Hero 6: The Series "Countdown to Catastrophe" (2018)
- Created by: Sharon Flynn; Paiman Kalayeh
- Voiced by: Andrew Scott
- Gender: Male

Obake (voiced by Andrew Scott) is a mysterious villain and former SFIT student named Bob Aken with a strange fascination towards Hiro, extending to the Big Hero 6 since before they officially decided on being superheroes. He has control over many other villains including Mr. Yama. Through Yama, he also worked with Momakase. In the episodes "Mini-Max" and "Countdown to Catastrophe", Obake was revealed to be Granville's student whom she allowed free rein in his research. This resulted in him suffering injuries caused by an explosion from his attempt of creating an energy amplifier, severely affecting his temporoparietal junction which greatly warped his sense of morality, making him psychotic, and is gradually worsening; despite being given awareness from Baymax, he refuses treatment, finding the condition "liberating".

Out of this insanity and his obsessions, Obake masterminded various events in the first season from Globby stealing one of Lenore Shimamoto's paintings for her energy amplifier blueprint to pointlessly learning of Big Hero 6's identities through hacking Krei's personal files and Noodle Burger Boy's prediction algorithm. Obake finally reveals himself while acquiring the notes he needed from Shimamoto's journal, furthering his goals by help in Steamer's capture and acquiring a super magnet by subjecting the team to their fears. In the three-part season one finale "Countdown to Catastrophe", acquiring the power amplifier Hiro made while hijacking Baymax, Obake reveals his goal to recreate the Great Catastrophe and remake San Fransokyo in his image with Hiro as his apprentice. But the Big Hero 6 circumvent the disaster, with Obake resigning himself as his underwater base crumbles from the shockwave with his fate left ambiguous.

=== Karmi ===
Karmi
- First appearance: Big Hero 6: The Series "Issue 188" (2018)
- Created by: Bill Motz; Bob Roth
- Voiced by: Haley Tju
- Age: 16
- Alias: Phoenomblina (in her mutant form)
- Gender: Female

Karmi (voiced by Haley Tju) is an intellectually gifted biology student at SFIT and Hiro's academic rival. Karmi was initially the youngest student attending SFIT, a fact that she was inherently proud of. She was considered anti-social by many and did not have any friends, considering the germs and microbes that she studied as her friends and treated almost as pets. When Hiro Hamada began seriously attending SFIT, Karmi felt threatened and showed an egotistical, cynical and boastful side. She cared very little for Hiro and hated working with a student that she felt "stole her thing" as the youngest student at SFIT. Ironically, Karmi has a huge crush on Hiro's superhero alter ego of which she was completely unaware was the same person. She is also under the assumption that Hiro has a crush on her of which she mocks him for. She prefers seeing Hiro fail to the point that she will record and upload his failures online, though it has been proven that he is smarter than her to a certain degree. Despite this, her invention gets funded by billionaire Liv Amara. She can be purposefully manipulative to those around her such as in "Kentucky Kaiju" when she convinced other students that Hiro's accidental mishaps were done on purpose.

Karmi has shown some concern for the health of others and criticized Hiro for not considering his own health and those around him when he was sick. She later gained his sympathy when famed scientist Trevor Trengrove kicked her out of his lecture and thanked Hiro for understanding, though they were both mutually disgusted by this afterwards. Karmi also writes fan fiction about herself and the Big Hero 6 with Hiro (whom she calls "Captain Cutie") depicted as her boyfriend. She incorporates her own scientific thoughts into her stories as they end up inspiring the heroes to use their powers in new and interesting ways. In season two she gets an internship at Sycorax. It is also slowly revealed that she does consider Hiro one of her only true friends and shows actual concern about him. She later develops a bond of sorts with Honey Lemon due to their similar fields of study, but is oblivious when she points out how similar she is to Hiro. She finally bonds with him in "City of Monsters" and reveals that she admired Tadashi for his genius. She is later transformed into a monster by Amara named herself Phoenomblina, but Hiro manages to get through to her by admitting that he cares about her. The real Liv Amara turns her back to normal. Later, Karmi leaves SFIT and San Fransokyo, but continues to write her fan fiction about Big Hero 6 and herself as Lab Lady.

Since moving away, Karmi has become a success as a webseries creator for her series Big Chibi 6. She reconnects with Hiro where it is heavily implied that she has developed feelings for him which he might reciprocate. Because of this, she is no longer attracted to "Captain Cutie", still unaware that they are one and the same. She has also taught herself about programming, again implied to have been inspired by Hiro, and uses her new ability to aid the team. She also displays a calmer and more sincere personality.

=== Richardson Mole ===
Richardson Mole
- First appearance: Big Hero 6: The Series "Issue 188" (2018)
- Created by: Bill Motz; Bob Roth
- Voiced by: Sean Giambrone
- Age: 11
- Gender: Male

Richardson Mole (voiced by Sean Giambrone) is a fanboy, comic book nerd, and Fred's arch-nemesis. Self-described as "San Fransokyo's most eligible eleven year old", Mole is a short, selfish, overweight, spoiled, and borderline sociopathic rich snob who is the antithesis to Fred. He owns his own comic book store and does everything he can to outsmart and humiliate his much older rival. He fancies himself as a ladies' man and pursues Go Go whom he affectionately calls "dream girl". However, the only thing the two seem to have in common is their mutual feeling of annoyance from Fred, though in Go Go's case it is only mild bemusement while Mole outright hates him. He owns a whole arcade dedicated to his hatred to Fred with a Whac-A-Mole variant being his favorite. Fred only gets favors from him as a last resort which Mole is happy to oblige simply to show his superior collection compared to Fred's. Ironically, he praises Fred's alter ego, whom he calls "Lizard Guy", and is completely disinterested in Go Go's alter ego.

His mother Binky Mole appears to not like her son's hobby, which does not seem to bother him, but he does hate it when people comment on his hygiene, which is terrible. He is further shown to be selfish, manipulative and even downright sinister as shown in "Big Hero 7". When he found out about the Big Hero 6's identities, he did not feel concern for the potential harm it could bring to others all because he could make money off of it. By the end of the episode, however, a major static shock to him by High Voltage's orb caused him to forget their identities. In "Supersonic Sue", it is revealed that Mole does not have any friends, considering the action figures that he has as his only "real" friends. While he boasts a big collection, he has no one to show it to. He continues to taunt Fred as he purchased the entire Mech-Wrestling League, despite the fact that he does not like wrestling and only did it to annoy Fred.

In season three, Mole is shown to be fully capable of converting to villainy; teaming up with the likes of Supersonic Sue and Supersonic Stu just so he can get back at Big Hero 6 for ignoring him, which ironically was his own fault to begin with for abusing their Halp phone for his own selfish needs just to hang out with them, essentially a "boy who cried wolf" situation. However, he manages to find some way to weasel himself out of any capital punishment, but his reputation is essentially ruined. In "Better Off Fred", he is revealed to have a cousin named Olivia whom he manipulates into disliking Fred by telling her that he was a jerk. However, she sees passed his machinations. He is also still afraid of the Supersonics. Furthermore, Mole is bothered at the thought that someone other than him can make Fred feel miserable; believing that it is his duty to do so. He adopts Nega-Globby after he is given a brain as the two end up sharing the same know-it-all personality and enjoy correcting each other.

=== Globby ===
Globby
- First appearance: Big Hero 6: The Series "Big Roommates 2" (2018)
- Created by: Jeff Poliquin
- Voiced by: Andy Richter
- Nickname: Glooby (by Richardson Mole)
- Gender: Male

Globby (voiced by Andy Richter) is a minor thief who was transformed into a super-powered villain. Dibs lived in the more harsh parts of San Fransokyo where he partook in his favorite pastime: taking part in petty crime by stealing purses. He was a terrible at his "job" as he always found himself losing whatever it was he tried to steal, once even losing Mr. Yama's money and was nearly dropped off a roof by him. He was finally successful in stealing Honey Lemon's chem-purse, thinking it was a regular purse, and hid in a warehouse belonging to Alistair Krei. Krei created a neuro-transmitter headband based on Hiro's design, with Dibs deciding to steal it after realizing it was worth something. But Dibs accidentally destroys the chem-purse while fleeing with the transmitter, the unstable chemical mix turned him into a blob-like humanoid mutant with the neuro-transmitter fused to his skull. Taking the name Globby which Fred made up, he had decided to become a career supervillain, though he prefers humiliation over killing people. In "Failure Mode", Globby learns that he can use the transmitter to alter his composition into any form of matter he can think of.

Globby eventually sees the error of his ways after learning Obake's plans to destroy the city (explaining that he was aware of Obake's insanity but "thought it was a 'fun' crazy"), and eventually reforms by helping the Big Hero 6 stop his plan. He apparently considers Felony Carl his only true friend. He had Honey Lemon and Karmi create a serum to turn him back to normal after realizing that he could not get a job. He ends up missing his powers and gets them back while also saving the city, earning the adoration of the public. He still hangs out with Felony Carl. Following the events of "The Globby Within", Globby has gone back to being viewed as a criminal due to Nega-Globby's influence. While it managed to get removed, Globby has been forced to go into hiding. He is later presumably cleared of any wrongdoing when he helps Big Hero 6 defeat Trina and her robot uprising. In "Krei-oke Night", he and Felony Carl are shown to be much closer and, as confirmed by the series' crew, are implied to be a couple.

=== Felony Carl ===
Felony Carl
- First appearance: Big Hero 6: The Series "Big Roommates 2" (2018)
- Created by: Jeff Poliquin
- Voiced by: Diedrich Bader
- Age: 42
- Gender: Male

Felony Carl (voiced by Diedrich Bader) is a former criminal in San Fransokyo. Carl was given his nickname by his mother, which he does not seem to mind as it is technically an accurate name. He gave up a life of crime, but continued to live in the rougher neighborhoods in San Fransokyo. He is shown to be positive about his own masculinity, as he admitted that he liked having his motorcycle colored glitter-pink. Carl is somewhat friends with Dibs, though he looked down on his attempts to be a criminal and told him to give up. After Dibs transformed into Globby, he still continued to criticize him though the two still seemed to be okay with him. Despite his huge and intimidating appearance, he is shown to be a very insightful person and very good at analyzing certain things and people. He nevertheless manages to find work as a bouncer for various places including the underground Food Fight competition and for various clubs throughout the San Fransokyo night life. Carl is also a self-described "hopeless romantic" and is shown trying to pursue a love life. He apparently also has a good relationship with his father as he seems to remember his birthday. He maintains information on criminal life despite putting it all behind him and apparently likes to be around Baymax due to his huggable appearance. According to Globby, he used to be known as "Delinquent Carl". Carl is shown to truly value his friendship with Globby as he was concerned for his safety after being framed by Nega-Globby. He is apparently employed at the Pizza Party-torium along with a reformed Mr. Sparkles. He and Globby were believed to have become a couple.

=== Noodle Burger Boy ===
Noodle Burger Boy
- First appearance: Big Hero 6: The Series "Killer App" (2018)
- Created by: Daniel Dominguez
- Voiced by: Lucas Neff
- Gender: Male

Noodle Burger Boy (voiced by Lucas Neff) is the robotic mascot to Noodle Burger. He is known for his prediction algorithm which allows him to guess his customers' choices. His designs were originally for the military and designed by Krei Tech, but abandoned. He was reused to become the "ultimate nostalgic robot boy mascot", but without the weapons. Obake used his technical capabilities to turn him back into a weapon and proceeds to cause trouble all across San Fransokyo. He is able to predict the Big Hero 6's abilities, but is defeated by Hiro and Wasabi when they switch costumes and abilities. He returns in "Kentucky Kaiju" where he takes over the titular monster to battle the Big Hero 6, but is once again defeated and escapes. He eventually moves in with Obake full time and aids him in attempting to blow up the city, though he fails. He completely turns his back on the Noodle Burger franchise and starts working alongside Trina whom he calls "big sis" and becomes openly affectionate to her. He spends much of season two aiding Trina and becoming something of a sidekick for her in an effort to continue Obake's plans. He attempts to bring the plan to fruition, but their plan fails and Noodle Burger Boy escapes while Trina is presumably incarcerated.

In the season three premiere, Noodle Burger Boy is by himself and openly misses Trina and Obake and sets out to make a new family consisting of mini A.I.'s such as himself. He succeeds in "recruiting" Hyper-Potamus, Hangry Panda and Crushroom, all of whom he refers to as "sis". In "Mini Noodle Burger Max", he is shown to retain some sensibility as not only was he willing to team up with Baymax and Mini-Max to rescue their respective teams, but he also sympathized with wanting to save what they considered family and shared his power when they were low on it. He and his family are ultimately defeated through the combined forces of Big Hero 6, Mini-Max, and Momakase. He begins working for Aunt Cass as a greeter at the Lucky Cat Café.

=== Mini-Max ===
Mini-Max
- First appearance: Big Hero 6: The Series "Mini-Max" (2018)
- Created by: Paiman Kalayeh
- Voiced by: John Michael Higgins
- Gender: Male

Mini-Max (voiced by John Michael Higgins) is a miniature version of Baymax. He was created by Hiro to act as a babysitter of sorts for Fred when the team realized that he was incapable of being kept out of trouble. However, Fred takes to him like a sidekick and openly treats him like one, declaring that he was the funny one compared to his "serious" demeanor, though it is plainly obvious that Fred displays absolutely no serious traits while Mini-Max possessed a more determined spirit. He is designed to be overly heroic and displays excellent martial arts skills despite his size. He eventually heads out to fight alongside the team, dressed in a small dark blue armor variant of Baymax's suit. He plays a big role in helping to defeat Obake in "Countdown to Catastrophe". In season two, Mini-Max becomes a more prominent character and frequently dons his armor to aid the heroes. He gets involved with the numerous shenanigans that the team take part in and displays numerous skills such as cooking. In "Mini-Maximum Trouble", Mini-Max is doused with water, causing him to short circuit. However, this causes him to glitch and he briefly turns evil, displaying that same amount of enthusiasm he had when he was a hero. Luckily, the team manage to switch him off and reprogram him back to his old self while also waterproofing him. He once again aids the team against Trina and Noodle Burger Boy when they attempted to obliterate San Fransokyo. In the season three episode "Trading Chips", it is revealed that Mini-Max is slightly self-conscious about his size, but he learns to overcome them. He is integral in defeating Noodle Burger Boy and his family and even sympathizes with them.

=== Di Amara ===
Di Amara
- First appearance: Big Hero 6: The Series "Big Problem" (2018)
- Last appearance: Big Hero 6: The Series "City of Monsters - Part II" (2019)
- Created by: Jenny Jaffe
- Voiced by: Mara Wilson
- Age: 23 (physically)
- Alias: Liv Amara
- Gender: Female

Diane "Di" Amara (voiced by Mara Wilson) is an evil clone of Liv Amara, the 23 year old billionaire CEO of Sycorax, one of the biggest corporations in San Fransokyo. While posing as her birth clone, she was considered an idol in the technology world and is always looking for the next best thing. Everyone loves her except for rival Alistair Krei whom she does not pay much attention to. While initially interested in Baymax, she was quick to turn Hiro away when she learned that he did not actually build him and thus did not think that Hiro was worthy of her company. She ultimately chose Karmi after finding her nano-receptors more interesting. Over time the two develop a close bond over similar interests and begin to collaborate over projects. She eventually takes her in as an intern for her company. Her villainous side is revealed when she begins offering her services to the likes of Momakase (aka Vicaneris), High Voltage (aka Eelectora and Tactirella) and being the one who transformed Orso Knox into a monster named Siranus through her own technology. Di displays a benevolent appearance, but is in reality a conniving and clever individual. In "Lie Detector", she is revealed to be keeping the real Liv Amara in a cryo-stasis for her condition. Di states that she "would do anything" to help her, explaining her motivation. She later turns on Karmi by transforming her into a monster named Phoenomblina and then kidnaps Hiro and Baymax in an attempt to remove the anti-viruses that were actually killing Liv. Despite succeeding, she wanted to continue her plans for creating monsters. She was stopped by Liv once she regained consciousness and promptly arrested along with her assistant Chris soon afterwards.

=== Trina ===
Trina
- First appearance: Big Hero 6: The Series "The Bot Fighter" (2018)
- Last appearance: Big Hero 6: The Series "Legacies" (2020)
- Created by: Han-Yee Ling
- Voiced by: Christy Carlson Romano
- Gender: Female

Trina Aken (voiced by Christy Carlson Romano) is the gynoid "daughter" created by Obake for the sole purpose of enticing Hiro into becoming part of his planned empire. She first appears posing as young bot-fighter who teams up with Hiro in the underground bot fighting circuit. It is soon revealed that she had been hacking into other competitors' robots to rob banks. Despite Hiro gaining a crush on her, he turns against Trina forcing her to flee back to Obake. Trina later reveals her robotic origin to Hiro while also casually flirting with him. Following Obake's defeat, she fled. She becomes a full time villain by giving herself a haircut and upgraded robot body. She works alongside Noodle Burger Boy whom she calls "little brother" and seems to show genuine concern for him. Trina spends much of season 2 trying to concoct her own plan for revenge against Big Hero 6. In "Something Fluffy", she and Noodle Burger Boy proceed to dig through garbage looking for parts for some kind of device. She openly voices her distaste for the other villains' recent monster transformations; calling them "losers". It is later revealed that her plan involves using what coding is left of her "father" Obake. Her plan finally comes to fruition in "Legacies" where she worked under Krei to create the Buddy Guardians. Now made to look much older and sporting a hairstyle similar to her creator, Trina, along with Noodle Burger Boy, attempted to use thermonuclear reactors, disguised as garbage trucks, to obliterate San Fransokyo; believing that she would continue her father's legacy. She is ultimately defeated and is implied to have been incarcerated.

=== Megan Cruz ===
Megan Cruz
- First appearance: Big Hero 6: The Series "Something's Fishy" (2019)
- Last appearance: Big Hero 6: The Series "Legacies" (2020)
- Created by: Sharon Flynn
- Voiced by: Isabella Gomez
- Age: 14
- Gender: Female

Megan Amelia Isabella Cruz (voiced by Isabella Gomez) is a girl who is the same age as Hiro who recently moved to San Fransokyo with her father, Diego Cruz, who is the chief of police. She is first introduced by Cass who wanted to set Hiro up with her as a potential date for him. Despite having only been with each other for a short time, the two get along really well with one another. Megan begins treating Hiro to regular teenage customs such as going to the prom. The two have since grown fond of one another and, as revealed by Fred, have apparently been "dating" for quite sometime. She wishes to become a journalist so she can learn Big Hero 6's identities. Not knowing that Hiro is, in fact, the leader of the team, she is unaware of his attempt to deter her from seeking the truth and simply mistakes Hiro's cover ups to him being weird. In "Hiro the Villain", she begins to double down on her researching when she hits a roadblock and quickly discovers that Big Hero 6 have mostly been spotted at places such as Krei Tech and SFIT. She tries to interview Krei and Granville, but she sees through their defensive interviewing maneuvers. When she learns about Tadashi's death at SFIT and Callaghan's involvement, Megan finally surmises that all Big Hero 6 related events tie back to Hiro. She confronts Hiro on her information and threatens to tell her father about them, but after being allowed to shadow the group and witnessing Hiro's heroic acts, changes her mind and decides to keep their secret. She becomes more active in "Legacies" where she aids Hiro in finding out where the Buddy Guardians came from. Following her father's revelation that Big Hero 6 are good and that Hiro is their leader, her relationship with her father improves. She is not seen again afterwards, but she is mentioned in "Big Chibi 6" by both Cass and Baymax. When Hiro begins showing romantic interest in Karmi, both inquire "What about Megan?", implying that two of them are no longer seeing each other, though it can be assumed that they are still friends.

=== Chief Cruz ===
Chief Cruz
- First appearance: Big Hero 6: The Series "Something's Fishy" (2019)
- Last appearance: Big Hero 6: The Series "Legacies" (2020)
- Created by: Sharon Flynn
- Voiced by: Néstor Carbonell
- Gender: Male

Chief Diego Cruz (voiced by Néstor Carbonell) is the newly elected chief of police of San Fransokyo. He has known Aunt Cass for years and left the city to pursue his career in law enforcement. When he came back, he had sired a daughter named Megan and had chosen to stay permanently. He considers Big Hero 6 a problem to the city and wishes his new position will allow him to double down on quelling vigilantism. Like most typical fathers, he is very protective of his daughter. Even though he is close to Aunt Cass, he is slightly suspicious of Hiro, primarily due to his closeness with Megan. Nevertheless, he supports her journalistic endeavors, especially since she is launching a project to discover the identities of Big Hero 6 which would make his job easier. Cruz has a crush on Cass to the point that he is willing to down coffee, a drink he dislikes, in her presence and insists that she call him by his first name. He begins his war against the Big Hero 6 in "The Globby Within" when Globby's powers start acting up (a side effect of devouring Nega-Globby). He puts a warrant out for his arrest and anyone aiding him. When he discovers Big Hero 6's effort in doing so, he puts a warrant out for them. He proudly claims that Big Hero 6's presence is what causes all the villains to show up. Despite this, Hardlight appears demanding to face them and kidnaps Cruz. Even though the heroes rescue him, he still holds a strong prejudice. It was later revealed in "Fred the Fugitive" that his attempt to quell vigilantism was mainly because his father sacrificed his life to a villain to save his son and Boss Awesome arrived too late. In "Legacies", Cruz finally sees the error of his ways when Megan is kidnapped by Trina and calls upon Big Hero 6 to help find and rescue her. Afterward, he learns their identities.

== Other characters ==
=== Other characters intorduced in the film ===
- Sergeant Gerson (voiced by Dan Gerson) is the police sergeant of the local San Fransokyo precinct. He appears uninterested in his job or really anything around him. He did offer his tape to Baymax when he was deflating and later perked up when they gave him more tape.
- Heathcliff / Mongoose (voiced by David Shaughnessy) is Fred's family butler who appears really close to him. Nothing fazes him and he takes his job seriously. He is revealed to be an expert driver; pulling a variety of impossible maneuvers in a limo. He was once a secret agent nicknamed Mongoose due to having an arch-nemesis, fittingly named Cobra. Boss Awesome aided him in defeating her once and in return, he decided to stay with the Fredericksons as their personal butler.
- Judy (voiced by Laura Silverman) is Krei's personal assistant. She was a silent character in the film. In the series, she speaks for the first time. She is sarcastic and bluntly talks about her boss and his company. Her name was not revealed until the second season, admitting that no one ever really asks. She apparently lives with her Nana.
- Mochi (vocal effects provided by Brock Powell) is Hiro and Aunt Cass' overweight Japanese Bobtail calico cat. They care deeply for their pet cat, though he can occasionally be a nuisance. He hates going to the veterinarian.
- Ringleader (voiced by Charlotte Gulezian) is an eye-patch wearing Asian woman who heads the bot-fights in San Fransokyo. She works under Mr. Yama. In the series, she is credited as Yama's Assistant. She is physically based on the Fujitas, who are canceled villains from the film.
- Abigail Callaghan (voiced by Katie Lowes) is Robert Callaghan's daughter. She wanted to be a bot-fighter, but grew up to be a pilot for Krei Tech. An accident left her lost in between dimensions and in suspension. Abigail is rescued by Hiro and Baymax and hospitalized.
- Frederick Frederickson III / Boss Awesome (voiced by Stan Lee) is Fred's father and a billionaire. Mr. Frederickson was once a superhero named Boss Awesome, but settled and had Fred whom he let into his past secret by the post-credits scene when Fred stumbled upon his secret lair. He travels the world on exotic exhibitions and appears to possess super-strength. Despite his old age, Frederick III is still vigorous and was able to handle his two old school villains Baron Von Steamer and Supersonic Sue. He owns a shipping company, explaining his lavish wealth. Frederick Frederickson III is modeled after his voice actor Stan Lee.

=== Other characters introduced in Big Hero 6: The Series ===
==== Introduced in season 1 ====
- Mrs. Frederickson (née Flamarian) / Major Blast (voiced by Susan Sullivan) is Fred's wealthy socialite mother who is embarrassed by her son's antics, but loves him nonetheless. She was initially embarrassed by how people perceived her and her family, but later learns to deal with it. In season two, she is revealed to not only know of her son's double life with Big Hero 6, but she also posed as a villain named Major Blast whose sole function was to test to see if her husband was capable of protecting himself. She donned the suit again to test Fred.
- Bluff Dunder (voiced by Diedrich Bader) is a news reporter for San Fransokyo. Known for his somewhat pompous delivery. Despite his lack of empathy for most things, he considers the Big Hero 6 to be true heroes and was shocked by the SFPD's warrant to arrest them. He has a pet pig named Noodles and his father Duff (also voiced by Diedrich Bader) was a news reporter as well.
- High Voltage is the electricity and pop music powered, mother/daughter duo Barb (voiced by Katy Mixon) and Juniper (voiced by Sophie Reynolds). They have dreams of becoming stars and rob places as they feel that stars "should not have to audition". They get their power from an electricity orb, but also have wristbands that are powered by a special cell battery. They attempted to go straight, but were given electric eel implants by Amara and gained the ability to create electricity and transform into eel-like monsters dubbed Eelectora and Tactirella. They are both returned to normal by Bessie in "City of Monsters". In season 3, they are doing community service to pay for their crimes.
- Beverly Samantha "Binky" Mole is Richardson Mole's wealthy socialite mother who looks down on the Fredericksons. She never speaks and is always disappointed with something including her own son.
- Baron Von Steamer (voiced by Jeff Bennett) is a steampunk-based villain and arch-enemy of Boss Awesome. According to Mr. Frederickson, he was old back when he fought him. He is offended that not a lot of people remember him and is apparently behind on the times. He is also not that smart as he thought Wasabi was Fred. He also doesn't seem to realize that Boss Awesome has moved on, though he does end up fighting him again and loses miserably.
- Momakase (voiced by Naoko Mori) is a professional thief and sushi chef who uses graphene bladed knives and katana as weapons. She considers herself the best chef and wanted to take down Cass when she was winning the cooking competitions. She is mostly out for herself and tends to sever ties with her employers. In "Fan Friction", she begins working for Obake. Following Obake's defeat, Momakase goes back to being a lone criminal. She makes a deal with Amara and receives implants that grant her claws and an animalistic appearance named Vicarenis. She is returned to normal by Bessie in "City of Monsters". In "Hiro the Villain", she is revealed to have a special pair of swords that have been integral to her family for generations and displays a sense of honor as she helped Big Hero 6 escape the police after Hiro helped her regain her swords from Yama, whose gangsters had forced Momakase's father to give up his blades in return for Momakase and her family's safety. She aids Big Hero 6 in the finale with defeating Noodle Burger Boy and his family and according to Fred is "nicer" now.
- Bolton Gramercy (voiced by Gordon Ramsay) is an arrogant chef and Cass' idol turned rival. He later learns humility after being defeated by Cass in an underground cooking competition as seen in "Food Fight". By the end of the episode, he asks for his knives back from Cass.
- Yum Labouché (voiced by Alton Brown) is a famous chef and judge in the underground cooking competition as seen in "Food Fight".
- Ned Ludd / Hibagon (voiced by Jon Rudnitsky) is a former real estate developer who turned against technology when an electromagnetic meteorite crashed in front of him and now lives in the Muirahara Woods which he named Bessie. He distrusts technology to the point that he considers Baymax a menace. Ned is attacked by Amara and transformed into the Hibagon, a legendary creature that he initially pretended to be to keep people out of the woods. He turns back to normal, but loses his prized possession Bessie. Ned returns to the city to reclaim Bessie.
  - Bessie (vocal effects provided by Fred Tatasciore) is a simple electromagnetic meteorite that landed the Muirahara Woods. "Her" powers are capable of dampening anything electric. She was stolen from Ned Ludd by Di Amara and used to create a bear-like monster dubbed Bessie (also known as Bessisaurus). Ludd eventually tamed Bessie and brought her back to the woods. In "Fred the Fugitive", Bessie is revealed to have given birth to three cubs.
- Dr. Mel Meyers (voiced by John Ross Bowie) is a scientist working under Krei and who also despises him for misusing his creation the Buddy-Drone, a bodyguard robot that he had built to be used for surprise parties. He is socially awkward and apparently has a slight crush on Cass after briefly meeting her.
- Mad Jacks are a team of high-octane black ops mercenaries whose members are all named in some variation of Jack. They are adrenaline junkies known for their catchphrase "Jack Attack!" and have their own website and theme song. In season 3 it is revealed that they have apparently retired from being mercenaries and instead host a television show called Bright Lights, Loud Noises.
  - Jack (voiced by Rob Riggle), is the leader of the Mad Jacks whose real name is Greg.
  - Jack (voiced by Kevin Michael Richardson) is the muscular, bald-headed, and dark-skinned member of the Mad Jacks who is their strategist.
  - Jaq (voiced by Kerri Kenney). is the female tan-skinned member of the Mad Jacks. She is the strongest of the three.
- Mr. Frank Sparkles (voiced by Patton Oswalt) is a maniacal and egotistical game show host who prefers his own fame over anyone else's. He kidnaps Hiro and Cass' cat Mochi after his unexpected internet fame and decides to commit into a full time supervillain. He uses his resources to entertain the wealthy though underneath, he uses the money he earns for his nefarious schemes. He is mostly looking for attention as he tried to claim that he was responsible for the monster outbreaks and becomes mutated by Amara, giving him plant-like qualities and the ability to telepathically control Mayois named Zyeroxelides, plant-based creatures also created by Amara. He is returned to normal by Bessie in "City of Monsters". In "A Fresh Sparkles", Mr. Sparkles, going by his real name Frank, has reformed and now works at the Pizza Party-torium. Mr. Sparkles is based on an abandoned character from the film.
- Sara (voiced by Jenifer Lewis) is the manager at Noodle Burger. She appears to be friendly especially to Fred, one of her loyal customers, but can be overly dramatic especially when Noodle Burger Boy disappeared. She is further devastated upon learning the fate of her beloved mascot. In the season 3 premiere, she has gotten a new job at the Hyper-Potamus Pizza-Party-Torium, only for that new mascot to suffer the same fate. She has once again tried to move on and even hired Mr. Sparkles and Felony Carl as employees.
- Dr. Trevor Trengrove (voiced by Andy Daly) is a prolific scientist who seems more concerned about his image. It is revealed that he is a phony, having stolen his thesis from former partner Wendy Wower and was forced by Yama to create a powerful robot.
- Dr. Wendy Wower (voiced by Riki Lindhome) is a children's entertainment scientist who used to work with Trevor Trengrove. She does not have any hard feelings on her former partner and forgives him when he admits his theft. She is shown to be just as intrigued about Baymax as Hiro was when he first met him. She claims to have based her personae on Granville. Wendy also hosts her own television show.
- The Weird Little Boy (voiced by Kari Wahlgren) is an unnamed child who appears to be a fan of Wendy Wower. He has spiky blond hair and wears three pairs of goggles on his head. He is shown to be observant and seems to love chaos. He is later revealed to be very shy and wants to grow up to be like Wendy, but had trouble expressing this.
- Lenore Shimamoto (voiced by Jeanne Sakata) is a famous artist who hid a brilliant scientific mind. She lived around 1906 and kept a diary of her scientific discoveries while furthering her career as an artist. Lenore is later revealed to have caused the Great Catastrophe of San Fransokyo as the result of her attempt of building an energy amplifier, leaving a phonograph cylinder and a painting concealing the blueprints to confess her actions while hoping none would repeat her work.
- Orso Knox (voiced by Fred Tatasciore) is a Shakespeare-loving scientist who somehow transformed himself into a hideous monster named Siranus that Fred and Alistair described as being "a whale, a dinosaur, and a piece of hair thrown into a blender." He seems to have a connection to the Fredericksons, Krei, and Amara. He is later "cured" of his transformations, but was actually under the control of Amara. He is later freed from his control by Bessie in "City of Monsters".

==== Introduced in season 2 ====
- Chris (voiced by Ben Feldman) is Di Amara's personal assistant who is eagerly happy and friendly to everyone. He likes going by the nickname of being Liv's "Chrisistant". He appears to have enhanced strength and other skills that make him efficient. Chris is revealed to be a creation of Amara's and has some dog, gorilla, and "foodie" DNA in him. He gets arrested along with Di following her.
- Nega-Globby (voiced by Dee Bradley Baker in the first appearance, Andy Richter in later appearances) is a sentient glob mass created by Amara after having her assistant stole a sample of Globby. It has a single eye taken from a living plant in her lab. It is mindless and only knows destruction. After being absorbed by Globby, it tried to take control of him, but was removed and encased in a special vacuum created by Big Hero 6. He was later released and given a brain that made him more humane, but also pompous and arrogant. The team eventually let him stay with Richardson Mole after it becomes apparent that they have similar personalities.
- The Mayoi (vocal effects provided by Dee Bradley Baker) are small adorable fluffy plant-based creatures. They become a huge hit with the people of San Fransokyo, but are in reality are unstable creatures that grow giant sized. The Mayoi were created by Di Amara, but are controlled by Mr. Sparkles aka Zyetoxelides. Honey Lemon later adopts one of them when they successfully defeat Di Amara.
- Supersonic Sue (voiced by Jane Lynch) is an old school rollerskating villain. She turned to a life of crime due to using "performance enhancing skates" in competitive rollerblading tournaments. Much like Steamer, she considers herself Boss Awesome's nemesis. She claims that seeing Go Go convinced her to return to crime. Her catchphrase is "Supersonic Sue me, why don't ya?"
- Liv Amara (voiced by Mara Wilson) is the 23 year old billionaire CEO of Sycorax who was kept in stasis by her clone Diane "Di" Amara after she attempted to create an "immortality project" where she developed symbiotic organisms designed to guard against disease and extend life expectancy. Her project was rejected however. With no one willing to support her, Liv had to test the organisms on herself. The organisms unexpectedly evolved to destroy human cells. As a result, Liv's health began to decline rapidly, resulting in creating a clone to help her and being kept in stasis by her clone. Hiro and Baymax destroy the anti-virus. Upon awakening from her cryostasis, Liv turns her clone and Chris in to the police following the revelation of her evil nature. While not shown, it is assumed that she willingly sold her company's former base property to Alistair Krei, most likely to make up for her past mistakes.
- El Fuego (voiced by Horatio Sanz) is a mech-wrestler who is boastful and the bad guy of the league. He considers himself better than anyone else and wished to challenge Baymax due to his size. His armor allows for limited flight and powerful punches along with a flame thrower attachment, hence the name El Fuego (Spanish for "The Fire").
- Uncle Samurai (voiced by Eric Bauza) is El Fuego's archenemy in the ring. He is considered the hero in mech-wrestling and is patriotic.
- Ian / Hardlight (voiced by Will Friedle) is Krei's nerdy employee. He is a tech expert who is always called "Ethan" by his boss. He leads a double life as a criminal named Hardlight who has the ability to create solid light constructs themed after video games he plays. His speech and mannerisms are composed of game related sayings. He is a fan of Karmi's Big Chibi 6 series and fought Big Hero 6 and her. He was defeated and arrested; getting outed in the process to Judy, Krei's assistant.
- Roderick "Roddy" Blair (voiced by John DiMaggio) is an old friend of Mr. Frederickson's who helped build the Boss Awesome base. He aids the team in rebuilding the interior of the Frederickson chocolate factory into an effective headquarters. Despite his good ol' boy personality, he openly finds Fred annoying and intrusive. Despite this, he does offer helpful advice to the young heroes. He used to design for villain lairs, but stopped after a villain named Dark Volt refused to pay him in full.
- Detective Kato (voiced by Eric Bauza) is a detective and member of the San Fransokyo Police Department. Unlike Chief Cruz, he believes that Big Hero 6 are helpful to the city.
- Basemax (voiced by Zehra Fazal) is the voice activated and artificial intelligence service to the Big Hero 6 Headquarters. Unlike the other Max's which were all built by Hiro, Basemax was created by Roddy. She has a strange "relationship" with Baymax as both practically perform the same function and have a habit of speaking at the same time, yet the two are civil enough to work out their programming.
- Celine Simard / Sirque (voiced by Jessica Paré) is a French accented acrobat/physicist/thief who traveled all over the world with her circus troupe; stealing things on the side. She stole Krei's Silent Sparrow project to make stealing easier. Despite being a criminal, she does seem to have her own set of morals.
- Supersonic Stu (voiced by Timothy Simons) is Supersonic Sue's grandson. Much like his grandmother, Stu is a villain imbued with special skates who, in his case, allows him to turn into a speed ball. He is not very bright and is very childish. He is easily distracted by cookies and being soothed by his grandmother's hugs. He admits that he is not smart and watches Wendy Wower so that he will be one day.
- Buddy Guardians (voiced by Eric Bauza) are giant robots created by Trina, through Krei Tech, to be used by the SFPD. They were used to destroy San Fransokyo, but were later given copies of Tadashi's medical chips. One of them has apparently developed a personality of its own and has taken an interest in magic.

==== Introduced in season 3 ====
- Hyper-Potamus (voiced by Kari Wahlgren) is an excitable "state of the art" animatronic hippopotamus that can fly. She was created for the Hyper-Potamus Pizza-Party-Torium, but was taken over by Noodle Burger Boy as part of his new "family" She is returned to normal by the series' end and begins working for Aunt Cass as a server.
- Hangry Panda (voiced by Nicole Sullivan) is a robotic giant panda with a movable mouth that can make juice. She was created for the San Fransokyo Zoo where she offered drinks to the guests while speaking in a constantly tempered mood. She was the first one to be turned evil by Noodle Burger Boy. She is returned to normal by the series' end and begins working for Aunt Cass as an order taker.
- Crushroom (voiced by Cree Summer) is a large armed mushroom like animatronic that is strong and mostly speak in third person. She mostly performed pizza deliveries on her own personal scooter before getting taken over by Noodle Burger Boy for his new "family". She is returned to normal by the series' end and begins working for Aunt Cass as busboy.
- Mayor Saito (voiced by Jeanne Sakata) is the mayor of San Fransokyo. Every year, she holds a "Mayor for a Day" event where people bid to be mayor for a day while she takes a break. She does not trust any of Alistair Krei's tech, but she has no other tech group to rely on at the moment.
- Curie (vocal effects provided by Fred Tatasciore) is Granville's Old English Sheepdog, who loves to bite and nibble on everything. Named after Marie Curie.
- Fermi (voiced by Fred Tatasciore) is Granville's Rottweiler, who is cocky and prone to being disobedient until he has Mr. Pip, his squeeze toy crab. Named after Enrico Fermi.
- Oppenheimer (voiced by Jeff Bennett) is Granville's Chihuahua, who is always bringing random things back ten times his size. Named after J. Robert Oppenheimer.
- Sergeant Suction is a small vacuum like robot whose primary function is to suck up waste. Noodle Burger Boy attempted to recruit it into his "family", despite it showing no concept of self awareness. It is destroyed after getting crushed. It later reappears, possibly another model, where it is once again employed to aid Noodle Burger Boy with one of his nefarious schemes.
- Krei Shuttle (voiced by Génesis Rodríguez) is a sentient A.I. shuttle created by Hiro and Honey Lemon for Krei's transit system. It resembles a bunny and has ears that are powered by positivity, giving it a perky personality similar to Homey Lemon. If fed negative emotions, she becomes gloomy and gives negative talk.
- Cobra (voiced by Kirby Howell-Baptiste) is an enemy from Heathcliff's past when he used to be a spy named Mongoose and was defeated by him when Heathcliff called help from Boss Awesome and fell into a volcano but survived and seeks revenge against him. She is a mysterious woman who steals technology. At some point, she copied Hiro's transmitter to control an army of robotic cobras that secrete paralyzing venom. She used to use real cobras.
- Olivia Mole (voiced by Nichole Bloom) is a comic book geek with a similar passion to Fred. She initially disliked him because her cousin, Richardson, told her he was a jerk. She realizes that he was lying and ends up liking Fred and begins to date him.
- 4 2 Sing are a popular K-Pop boy band consisting of two sets of twins Dae and Hyun-Ki (both voiced by Nichkhun) and Kwang-Sun and Ye Joon (both voiced by Jae Park). They are flashy and pompous, though very talented. They wanted to be superheroes to distinguish themselves from other groups, but are incredibly incompetent and do not know how to fight, and take credit for every successful win Big Hero 6 takes, showing up only at the last minute to take pictures with the press. They eventually come to their senses.
- Queen of Spamivia (voiced by Zehra Fazal) is an email virus that took over Basemax briefly. She acts almost like a sentient A.I. and speaks in medieval terms, even going so far as to "knight" Baymax and Mini-Max onto her side in starting her robot uprising.
- Rishi Patel (voiced by Julian Zane) is an eleven-year-old hacking prodigy who is selected as a potential student for SFIT. He turns out to be just as disruptive and rude as Hiro was when he first joined. He begins to appreciate the school when he learns that supervillains attack it and teams up with Hiro to defend it. Granville has him become Hiro's protégé for the fall semester, much to his delight.

=== Introduced in Baymax! ===
- Kiko Tanaka (voiced by Emily Kuroda) is an elderly woman who disliked swimming because it brought up the painful memory of not being able to join her husband for a swim before he died. She had a very grumpy exterior before Baymax came and helped her face her fears.
- Sofia (voiced by Lilimar) is a pre-teen girl who experiences her first period. While angry and upset as she feels that her childhood is ending, Baymax manages to help her by making her realize that she is still young and has her whole life ahead of her. She is very talented with yo-yos.
- Ali (voiced by Zeno Robinson) is a pre-teen boy and Sofia's best friend who is talented with yo-yos.
- Mbita (voiced by Jaboukie Young-White) is a man who runs a food truck called "Just Fish Soup". He discovers that he has a fish allergy, thus ruining his business and scaring him about the future. With Baymax's help, he learns to embrace change and even manages to ask his crush out, Yukio.
- Yukio (voiced by Brian Tee) is an apple vendor. He is friendly with Mbita and later agrees to go out on a date with him.
- Yachi is a feisty orange cat that accidentally gets an earbud stuck in her throat. She actually wishes to have a loving home. It is implied that she gets adopted by Kiko.

=== Introduced in the comics ===
- Professor Jill Kameela is a teacher at SFIT who runs the Baryonic Dark Matter research team. Wasabi apparently looks up to her and desires to be a part of her team.
- Alex Miromoto is a famous tech lecturer who found a way to create solidified holograms for communication purposes. He started using the technology himself to rob places with his assistant. He can only project through the use of a cell phone.
- Olivia Vega / Mechadama is a fellow student at SFIT who idolized Go Go. Unaware that she and her superhero persona were the same, she decided to improve on the tech by using photon energy. She began committing crimes to aid her ailing grandmother. After getting caught, Go Go and Granville got the victims to drop the charges so that they can help her.
