= Baymax =

Comic book superhero

- Baymax as depicted in Alpha Flight (vol. 3) #9 (January 2005). Art by Clayton Henry.

Publication information
- Publisher: Marvel Comics
- First appearance: Sunfire & Big Hero 6 #1 (September 1998)
- Created by: Steven T. Seagle; Duncan Rouleau

In-story information
- Species: Synthetic entity
- Team affiliations: Big Hero 6
- Partnerships: Hiro Takachiho
- Abilities: Morph body into dragon or mecha

Baymax is a fictional superhero character appearing in American comic books published by Marvel Comics. Created by Steven T. Seagle and Duncan Rouleau, Baymax first appeared in Sunfire & Big Hero 6 #1 (September 1998). Baymax begins his existence as Hiro Takachiho's science project. Originally designed to be a hydro-powered robotic synthformer programmed to serve as Hiro's personal bodyguard, butler and chauffeur, Baymax becomes Hiro's best friend and father figure after being programmed with his recently deceased father's brain engrams. When the Giri recruits Hiro into the fledgling super-team Big Hero 6, Baymax also joins the team, where his phenomenal strength, amazing surveillance and data analysis capabilities have proven useful.

Baymax is an artificial synthformer capable of synthtransing his body into various forms: a large humanoid male, "Battle-Dragon" and "Action-Mecha". The first serves as his default form, designed to be less conspicuous in public while attending to Hiro's daily needs. His other forms, significantly more powerful and imposing, are primarily used during undercover missions and other hostile operations. In all forms, Baymax has internal scanners and sensors able to detect and evaluate threats posed by nearby lifeforms. He is also programmed with fighting techniques from forms of combat including karate, tae kwon do, Western boxing and Wing Chun.

Baymax appears in the 2014 Disney animated film Big Hero 6 and its extended media, voiced by Scott Adsit. He is depicted as an inflatable robot built by Tadashi, the older brother of the protagonist Hiro Hamada, to serve as a healthcare companion. When he is with Big Hero 6, Baymax wears armor that has wings allowing him to fly, while his fists can detach like rocket punches. The armor also has magnets attached to his back for Hiro to stick on while flying. Baymax appeared in the sequel television series, which continued the story of the film which aired from 2017 to 2021 on Disney Channel and Disney XD. Baymax appeared in the spin-off series Baymax!, it premiered on June 29, 2022 on Disney+.

== Publication history ==
Created by Steven T. Seagle and Duncan Rouleau in their spare time while working on another project, Baymax was first intended to appear with the rest of Big Hero 6 in Alpha Flight #17 (December 1998). However, the team first appeared in their own self-titled three-issue miniseries by writer Scott Lobdell and artist Gus Vasquez, which due to scheduling issues, was published before Alpha Flight #17. The character appeared with the team in a subsequent five-issue miniseries which was launched by Marvel Comics in September 2008.

== Fictional character biography ==
Monster Baymax began his existence as a science project created by Hiro. He was originally designed to be a hydro-powered robotic synthformer programmed to serve as Hiro's personal bodyguard, butler, and chauffeur. However, prior to the project's completion, Hiro's father died and the young inventor programmed Baymax's artificial intelligence using the brain engrams of his recently deceased father. With the thoughts and emotions of Hiro's father, Baymax became much more than a robotic bodyguard. He also functions as Hiro's best friend and father figure, and is by his side nearly every hour of every day. Baymax also feels a deep attachment to Hiro's mother; however, Hiro and Baymax decided it was not in her best interest to inform her that her departed husband's memories were used as the basis for Baymax's artificial intelligence, at least for the time being.

Baymax is programmed to serve and protect Hiro and therefore unable to allow his creator to be placed in possibly dangerous situations. When the Giri attempted to recruit Hiro into the fledgling super-team known as Big Hero 6, Baymax was also on their list of potential operatives. Baymax opposed the idea of Hiro being placed in harm's way but acquiesced to joining the team after the Everwraith, the astral embodiment of those killed in the atomic bombings of Hiroshima and Nagasaki, abducted Hiro's mother. Baymax continues to serve alongside Hiro on Big Hero 6.

== Powers and abilities ==
Baymax is an artificial synthformer capable of synthtransing his body into various forms. His default form is a large humanoid male designed to be less conspicuous in public while attending to Hiro's daily needs. His other forms "Battle-Dragon" and "Action-Mecha", are significantly more powerful and imposing than his default humanoid form, and are primarily used during undercover missions and other hostile operations. When Baymax sustains physical injuries beyond his damage threshold, he automatically reverts to his humanoid form and becomes temporarily depowered.

In all forms, Baymax is equipped with internal scanners and sensors able to detect and evaluate the threat posed by lifeforms in the immediate vicinity. He can also deploy remote monitors to record events from afar. His feet are equipped with jet engines capable of generating a thrust sufficient to propel him at speeds up to Mach 4. He can send, receive, and intercept radio transmissions, and monitors all networks maintained by the Japanese Ministry of Defense. Baymax is also directly linked to Hiro's Core Cyber-Network (CCN). As a result, when Baymax is not in Hiro's vicinity, he can be immediately summoned via a wrist-mounted communication device. Baymax is also connected to Hiro's cybernetic glasses, so that everything that Hiro sees and hears while wearing the glasses is stored in Baymax's databanks for later reference and analysis.

Baymax is programmed with fighting techniques from several forms of combat, including karate, tae kwon do, Western boxing, and Wing Chun. He possesses a durable, polymantium endo/exoskeleton resistant to most forms of small ballistics. Baymax uses water as his primary source of power for locomotion. His artificial intelligence system is memory-card-based and contains thoughts and emotions of Hiro's deceased father Tomeo.

== Reception ==
In 2020, Comic Book Resources (CBR) ranked Baymax 4th in their "Marvel Comics: Ranking Every Member Of Big Hero 6 From Weakest To Most Powerful" list.

== In other media ==
=== Disney adaptation ===
Baymax
- Big Hero 6 character
- Walt Disney Animation Studios re-imagining of Baymax
- First appearance: Big Hero 6 (2014)
- Adapted by: Jordan Roberts; Robert L. Baird; Daniel Gerson
- Voiced by: Scott Adsit

In-universe information
- Nicknames: The Red Panda (by Karmi); Hugs (by Trina)
- Species: Robot

Baymax appears in Disney's Big Hero 6 franchise, voiced by Scott Adsit. This version is a white inflatable robot built by Hiro Hamada's late older brother Tadashi to serve as a personal health care provider companion. Co-director Don Hall said "Baymax views the world from one perspective—he just wants to help people, he sees Hiro as his patient." Producer Roy Conli said "The fact that his character is a robot limits how you can emote, but Scott was hilarious. He took those boundaries and was able to shape the language in a way that makes you feel Baymax’s emotion and sense of humor. Scott was able to relay just how much Baymax cares." The film was released under the title Baymax in Germany and Japan. Baymax's design in the film drew influence from Japanese anime and Shogun Warriors toys. Mecha designer Shigeto Koyama, who previously did design work for mecha anime such as Gunbuster 2, Eureka Seven, Gurren Lagann and Rebuild of Evangelion, worked on the concept design for Baymax.

While battling Yokai, Hiro teaches Baymax to fight and gives him armor equipped with wings and detachable rocket fists. Baymax sacrifices himself to save Hiro and Yokai's daughter Abigail, but entrusts the former with his personality chip, enabling him to be transferred into a new body.

In Big Hero 6: The Series, Hiro builds several robots based on Baymax: Skymax drones who maintain the team's costumes, and Mini-Max (voiced by John Michael Higgins), who watches over Fred.

Baymax also appears as the protagonist in the Disney+ spin-off series Baymax!, where he is dedicated to helping several citizens of San Fransokyo.

==== Video games ====
- Baymax appears as a playable character in Disney Infinity 2.0 and Disney Infinity 3.0.
- Baymax appears as an unlockable playable character in Disney Magic Kingdoms.
- Baymax appears as a playable character in Disney Heroes: Battle Mode.
- The original and second Baymax appear as non-playable characters in Kingdom Hearts III, voiced by Scott Adsit in English and Tokuyoshi Kawashima in Japanese. Dark Riku retrieves the original Baymax and uses the power of darkness to manipulate him, but Sora and the second Baymax defeat him, destroy his combat chip, and restore his original self.
- An alternate universe variant of Baymax appears as a playable character in Disney Mirrorverse.
- Baymax appears as an unlockable outfit in Fortnite.
- Baymax appears as a playable character in Disney Speedstorm.

==== Theme park attractions ====
Baymax appears in The Happy Ride with Baymax, a rotating car ride at Tokyo Disneyland.

==== Other appearances ====
Baymax makes cameo appearances in Ralph Breaks the Internet (2018) and Once Upon a Studio (2023), with Scott Adsit reprising his role in the latter.

== In the COVID-19 pandemic ==
In mainland China, the term Baymax (Chinese: 大白; pinyin: Dàbái) or Dabai is used to refer to epidemic prevention personnel wearing white full-body protective suits. The term Dabai was used by official media as early as February 2020 to refer to epidemic prevention workers. The nickname comes from the public's intuitive description of the visual appearance of personnel dressed in white protective gear, which resembles Baymax. This nickname became popular during the COVID-19 pandemic, frequently appearing in online discussions, media reports, and official statements. The number of short videos related to Dabai on platforms such as TikTok correlated with local outbreak severity and epidemic control efforts, peaking in the first half of 2022.
