= Honey Lemon =

Character of Marvel Comics

Publication information
- Publisher: Marvel Comics
- First appearance: Sunfire & Big Hero 6 #1 (September 1998)
- Created by: Steven T. Seagle; Duncan Rouleau

In-story information
- Alter ego: Aiko Miyazaki
- Species: Human
- Team affiliations: Big Hero 6
- Abilities: Purse of hammer space; Trained martial artist; Brilliant scientist; Genius intellect

Honey Lemon (Aiko Miyazaki) is a superhero appearing in American comic books published by Marvel Comics. The character is commonly associated with the Japanese team known as Big Hero 6. Created by Steven T. Seagle and Duncan Rouleau, she first appeared in Sunfire & Big Hero 6 #1 (September 1998).

A re-imagined version of Honey Lemon appears as a young American woman in the 2014 Disney animated film Big Hero 6 and television series, voiced by Genesis Rodriguez and in the video game Kingdom Hearts III. She is a quirky chemistry whiz who has a kind heart and tries to find the good in everything. She has a purse that can mix different chemical elements, allowing her to create balls that she uses as explosives or traps.

== Publication history ==
Created by Steven T. Seagle and Duncan Rouleau in their spare time while working on another project, Honey Lemon was intended to appear with the rest of Big Hero 6 in Alpha Flight #17 (December 1998). However, the team first appeared in their own self-titled three-issue miniseries by writer Scott Lobdell and artist Gus Vasquez, which due to scheduling issues, was published before Alpha Flight #17. The character appeared with the team in a subsequent five-issue miniseries which was launched by Marvel Comics in September 2008.

== Fictional character biography ==
Aiko Miyazaki was enrolled in the graduate program at the Tokyo University of Science when she was recruited by Naikaku Jōhō Chōsashitsu (Naichō), Japan's premiere intelligence agency. Miyazaki's sharp intellect and stunning looks made her a prime candidate for secret agent status, and she was promptly placed on a government research and development team. Although Miyazaki's team was responsible for several innovations in surveillance technology, by far their most significant invention was a cluster of artificial, miniature wormholes. At Miyazaki's suggestion, the wormholes were contained within an innocuous woman's purse so they could be applied in the field without attracting undue attention, enabling the purse to contain virtually any object, no matter how large.

Soon after, the top-secret consortium of Japanese politicians and business entities known as the Giri began recruiting candidates for Big Hero 6, which was to become Japan's premiere superhero team. Inspired by the exploits of Sunfire, Japan's national superhero, Miyazaki persuasively lobbied her superiors in Naichō for a spot on the team. Graduating to full-fledged "secret agent" status, Miyazaki adopted the code-name "Honey Lemon" (inspired by her favorite television program of the same name). As the most caring and compassionate member of the team, Honey Lemon quickly found herself at odds with teammate GoGo Tomago, a tough-talking ex-convict who felt that Honey Lemon received special treatment because of her looks and intellect. However, after several heated squabbles, the two eventually learned to appreciate one another and became good friends.

She seemingly became attracted to the team's newest potential recruit, Hiro Takachiho, inasmuch as she kept smiling at him in a flirtatious way. Later, Honey helped overthrow a menace called Everwraith and saved Japan from destruction.

She was only briefly seen afterwards, helping Sunfire out in Canada. Sometime later, a mysterious individual used a machine to mind-control the entire team of Big Hero Six and they were sent to Canada once again, where they fought the newest incarnation of Alpha Flight until Sasquatch discovered the plot. Honey Lemon was, along with the rest of the team, brought back to normal, and they all returned to Japan to try to discover who mind-controlled them.

== Powers and abilities ==
Honey Lemon's Power Purse (also known as the "Nano-Purse") contains a series of miniature, artificial, inter-universe wormholes, granting her limited access to an indeterminate number of worlds and dimensions. The unstable, fluctuating nature of the wormholes makes accurate long-term mapping of them difficult. Before deploying in the field, Honey Lemon typically gathers a large arsenal of supplies, shrinks them to microscopic size using a combination of Pym Particles and cutting-edge nanotechnology, and stores them in miniature pocket universes only accessible via the Power Purse's wormholes. In the field she can instantaneously retrieve items of her choosing restored to their original size.

The Power Purse's wormholes also grant access to a number of full-sized, inhabited dimensions. For instance, the Microverse planet of Coronar (home world of former Big Hero 6 member Sunpyre) is accessible through the Power Purse. The total number of dimensions accessible via the Power Purse has yet to be determined. Although Honey Lemon can use the Power Purse's wormholes as a method of personal transportation, she only does so in rare instances when her life is in danger, as a trip through the Power Purse is often a very unpleasant experience for carbon-based lifeforms.

Honey Lemon is a brilliant scientist who often keeps her opponents off-guard by feigning ignorance. As a secret agent of the Naichō intelligence agency, she is extensively trained in various martial arts, including aikido, judo, jujutsu, karate, Shaolin kung fu and tae kwon do.

== Reception ==
=== Accolades ===
- In 2020, Scary Mommy included Honey Lemon in "Looking For A Role Model? These 195+ Marvel Female Characters Are Truly Heroic" their list.
- In 2020, CBR.com ranked Honey Lemon 7th in their "Marvel Comics: Ranking Every Member Of Big Hero 6 From Weakest To Most Powerful" list.

== In other media ==
=== Disney version ===
Honey Lemon
- Big Hero 6 character
- Walt Disney Animation Studios re-imagining of Honey Lemon
- First appearance: Big Hero 6 (2014)
- Adapted by: Jordan Roberts; Robert L. Baird; Daniel Gerson
- Voiced by: Genesis Rodriguez

In-universe information
- Nickname: Tall Girl (by Karmi)
- Gender: Female
- Occupation: Chemical engineering student
- Affiliation: Big Hero 6

Honey Lemon appears in Big Hero 6, voiced by Genesis Rodriguez. This version is a student of the San Fransokyo Institute of Technology who specializes in chemistry. Co-director Chris Williams said, "She's a glass-is-half-full kind of person. But she has this mad-scientist quality with a twinkle in her eye—there's more to Honey than it seems." Honey Lemon wears bright pink armor that was built by Hiro with a mechanical purse that can mix different chemical elements, allowing her to create balls that she can use as explosives, traps, or safe exits.

Honey Lemon appears in Big Hero 6: The Series, with Rodriguez reprising the role.

==== Video games ====
- Honey Lemon appears as a non-playable character in Big Hero 6: Battle in the Bay.
- Honey Lemon appears as an unlockable playable character in Disney Magic Kingdoms.
- Honey Lemon appears as a playable character in Disney Heroes: Battle Mode.
- Honey Lemon appears in Kingdom Hearts III, voiced by Genesis Rodriguez in the English version and Mai Yamane in Japanese.
- Honey Lemon appears as a playable character in Disney Speedstorm.

==== Other appearances ====
Honey Lemon makes a cameo appearance in Once Upon a Studio.
