= GoGo Tomago =

Fictional character in the Marvel universe

Go-Go Tomago
- Go-Go Tomago. Art by David Nakayama.

Publication information
- Publisher: Marvel Comics
- First appearance: Sunfire & Big Hero 6 #1 (September 1998)
- Created by: Steven T. Seagle; Duncan Rouleau

In-story information
- Alter ego: Leiko Tanaka
- Species: Human
- Team affiliations: Big Hero 6
- Abilities: Battlesuit granting the ability to transform body into explosive ball of energy; Accomplished racer and stunt driver; Skilled motorcyclist

Go-Go Tomago (Leiko Tanaka) is a superhero appearing in American comic books published by Marvel Comics. Created by Steven T. Seagle and Duncan Rouleau, she first appeared in Sunfire & Big Hero 6 #1.

A re-imagined version of Go-Go appears in Big Hero 6 (2014), voice provided by Jamie Chung. She is depicted as a stoic, athletic adrenaline junkie who wields electromagnetic discs and roller skates. Chung reprised the role in the making of Big Hero 6: The Series and the video game Kingdom Hearts III.

== Publication history ==
Created by Steven T. Seagle and Duncan Rouleau in their spare time while working on another project, GoGo Tomago was intended to appear with the rest of Big Hero 6 in Alpha Flight #17 (December 1998). However, the team first appeared in their own self-titled three-issue miniseries by writer Scott Lobdell and artist Gus Vasquez which, due to scheduling issues, was published before Alpha Flight #17. The character appeared with the team in a subsequent five-issue miniseries which was launched by Marvel Comics in September 2008.

== Fictional character biography ==
Raised on the streets of Utsunomiya, Tochigi Prefecture, young street urchin Leiko Tanaka fell in with the Shikei-otaku, one of the many youth-based motorcycle gangs (bōsōzoku) involved in yakuza activities. At age 18, she was arrested during a botched robbery of the Kiyohara Industrial Complex and sentenced to a term of five years in Tochigi Prison. However, before serving her full sentence, engineers from Japan's Ministry of Defense came to her with a deal: secure an early release from prison in exchange for test piloting an experimental exosuit. Tanaka, who was chosen as a test subject based on her good behavior in prison and her high-speed motorcycling skills, accepted the government's terms and soon found herself in the "Go-Go Tomago" exosuit, named for the sphere-like shape the armor takes when propelling through the air at high velocities ("tomago" being a corruption of "tamago", the Japanese word for "egg").

When the top-secret consortium of Japanese politicians and business entities known as the Giri was formed to recruit and train potential superhuman operatives for Big Hero 6, Go-Go Tomago was chosen to be a founding member of the team due to her proficiency with the exosuit and the belief that her fear of being sent back to prison would make it easy for the Giri to control her. Impulsive and hotheaded, Go-Go initially clashed with virtually every member of her new team. She refused to take orders from the team's initial field leader, Silver Samurai (Kenuichio Harada), and was jealous of teammate Honey Lemon (Aiko Miyazaki). However, once becoming acclimated to the team, her grudging respect for her teammates evolved into true kinship.

== Powers and abilities ==
The Go-Go Tomago battle suit is a voice-activated device that absorbs and amplifies kinetic energy, enabling its wearer to temporarily transubstantiate his or her body mass into thermochemical energy simply by uttering the trigger words "Go-Go Tomago." This transformation can be either partial or total. During a partial transformation, the wearer's body is surrounded by a half-inch thick thermochemical aura that grants the wearer limited invulnerability, flight and energy projection capabilities. During a total transformation, the wearer's entire body transubstantiates into a high-speed, high-impact spherical "powerball", which builds up greater speed and force with every additional ricochet impact while in motion. After a series of sufficiently numerous and forceful ricochets to build up power, the wearer can hurl him or herself into a given target with tremendous explosive impact. Go-Go Tomago is apparently unlimited by the amount of time that she can remain in the thermochemical powerball form, although her body becomes fatigued after extended periods of ricocheting at high speeds. She has been timed at speeds of up to 185 miles per hour. The Go-Go Tomago helmet is made of carbon fiber and is extremely durable and lightweight.

Go-Go Tomago is also a skilled motorcyclist and an accomplished racer and stunt driver. She also has several contacts in Japan's criminal underworld, as many of her former bōsōzoku associates are unaware that she secretly serves as a member of Japan's premiere super-hero team.

== Reception ==
=== Accolades ===
- In 2020, Scary Mommy included Go-Go Tomago in their "Looking For A Role Model? These 195+ Marvel Female Characters Are Truly Heroic" list.
- In 2020, CBR.com ranked Go-Go Tomago 6th in their "Marvel Comics: Ranking Every Member Of Big Hero 6 From Weakest To Most Powerful" list.

== In other media ==
=== Disney version ===
Go Go Tomago
- Big Hero 6 character
- Walt Disney Animation Studios re-imagining of Go Go Tomago
- First appearance: Big Hero 6 (2014)
- Created by: Don Hall; Chris Williams
- Adapted by: Jordan Roberts; Robert L. Baird; Daniel Gerson
- Voiced by: Jamie Chung

In-universe information
- Nickname: Speed Queen (by Karmi)
- Gender: Female
- Occupation: Mechanical Engineering Student
- Affiliation: Big Hero 6

==== Film ====
Go Go Tomago appears in Big Hero 6 (2014), voiced by Jamie Chung. This version is a tough, athletic, and stoic adrenaline junkie and student of the San Fransokyo Institute of Technology who developed electromagnetic wheels. Co-director Don Hall said "She's definitely a woman of few words...We looked at bicycle messengers as inspiration for her character." Her name is a nickname that was thought of by Fred with her real name, which is never said in the film, being something "non threatening", with Chung settling on Ethel due to it being a reference to ethanol. Go Go wears a yellow armored suit that was built by Hiro with large electromagnetic disks that can be used as inline skates and contain smaller disks that can be thrown as projectiles.

==== Television ====
Go Go Tomago appears in Big Hero 6: The Series, voiced again by Jamie Chung.

==== Video games ====
- Go Go Tomago appears as a playable character in Big Hero 6: Battle in the Bay.
- Go Go Tomago appears as a limited-time unlockable playable character in Disney Magic Kingdoms.
- Go Go Tomago appears as a playable character in Disney Heroes: Battle Mode.
- Go Go Tamago appears as a non-playable character in Kingdom Hearts III, voiced again by Jamie Chung.

==== Other appearances ====
Go Go makes a cameo appearance in Once Upon a Studio.
