= Hiro Takachiho =

- Hiro Takachiho by David Nakayama

Publication information
- Publisher: Marvel Comics
- First appearance: Sunfire & Big Hero 6 #1 (Sept. 1998)
- Created by: Steven T. Seagle & Duncan Rouleau

In-story information
- Alter ego: Hiro Takachiho
- Species: Human
- Team affiliations: Big Hero 6
- Abilities: Advanced intelligence

Hiro Takachiho is a character appearing in American comic books published by Marvel Comics. He first appeared in Sunfire & Big Hero 6 #1, and was created by Steven T. Seagle and Duncan Rouleau.

The character is known as Hiro Hamada and voiced by Ryan Potter in the Big Hero 6 film and television series and related media. He is a young robotics prodigy who helps form the superhero group Big Hero 6 to protect the city. The character is also changed to half Japanese and half White American.

== Publication history ==
Created by Steven T. Seagle and Duncan Rouleau in their spare time while working on another project, Hiro was first intended to appear with the rest of Big Hero 6 in Alpha Flight #17 (December 1998). However, the team first appeared in their own self-titled three-issue miniseries by writer Scott Lobdell and artist Gus Vasquez, which due to scheduling issues, was published before Alpha Flight #17. The character appeared with the team in a subsequent five-issue miniseries which was launched by Marvel Comics in September 2008.

== Fictional character biography ==
Born to wealthy industrialist Tomeo and Maemi Takachiho, Hiro was raised in the affluent Tokyo suburb of Yoga, City of Setagaya. His parents noticed his intellectual brilliance at an early age, and he was placed in pre-school at age 2. He was eventually recognized as one of the world's most brilliant child prodigies and was accepted into the prestigious private Tesuka Advanced Science Institute. It was at the Tesuka Institute that young Hiro's proficiency for invention and innovation was discovered. He created his first and greatest invention to date, the robot Baymax, as a project for the institute's science fair.

At age 13, Hiro was targeted by the Giri, a top-secret consortium of Japanese politicians and business entities that was established to recruit and train potential operatives for a Japanese super-team, Big Hero 6. Silver Samurai, Big Hero 6's initial field leader, first approached Hiro's mother for permission to have him join the team, but she refused as she wanted her child to live a normal life. Silver Samurai then approached Hiro directly, but the boy was less than impressed with Big Hero 6. However, after his mother was abducted by the Everwraith, the astral embodiment of those killed in the nuclear attacks on Hiroshima and Nagasaki, Hiro was forced to turn to Big Hero 6 for assistance. After joining forces with the team, which also included his idol, the Japanese hero Sunfire, Hiro opted to join the team. In fact, when Silver Samurai and Sunfire left the Big Hero 6, Hiro was appointed to serve as the team's field leader. He continues to maintain a civilian life and attend classes at the Tesuka Institute, although his teachers and classmates are unaware that he moonlights as a secret agent.

== Powers and abilities ==
Hiro is a brilliant child prodigy, proficient in many fields of science and technology, with a focus on biology, physics, and robotics. Although he is only an adolescent, he is a visionary theoretician and accomplished machinesmith who has already made several breakthroughs in fields such as robotics, computer science, synthetic polymers, geology, biology, and communications. He is also a gifted tactician and strategist.

Hiro has constructed several robots, his first and most advanced creation being Baymax, a water-powered synthformer whose artificial intelligence is based on the thoughts and memories of his deceased father. Other notable inventions include: the Bio-Atomic Parcel Detector (B-APD), a device capable of pinpointing the location of human-sized nuclear reactors; a jet-pack-propelled flight suit that grants limited firepower capabilities; a holographic virtual reality projector that can produce a comprehensive recreation of previous events by amassing information from various data streams; and eyeglasses with a cybernetic video display that can connect to an assortment of computer networks. Many of Hiro's inventions are connected to the Core Cyber Network (CCN), a computer network that enables them to communicate with one another.

== Reception ==
- In 2020, CBR.com ranked Hiro Takachiho 3rd in their "Marvel Comics: Ranking Every Member Of Big Hero 6 From Weakest To Most Powerful" list.

== Disney version ==
Hiro Hamada
- Big Hero 6 character
- Walt Disney Animation Studios re-imagining of Hiro
- First appearance: Big Hero 6 (2014)
- Adapted by: Jordan Roberts; Robert L. Baird; Daniel Gerson
- Voiced by: Ryan Potter
- Age: 14

In-universe information
- Nickname: Captain Cutie (by Karmi); Big Hero Guy (by Rishi Patel)
- Gender: Male
- Family: Unnamed parents (deceased); Tadashi Hamada (older brother)
- Relatives: Cass (aunt)

=== Film ===
In the film adaptation, Hiro, with his last name changed to Hamada and his ethnicity changed to being half White, half East Asian, appears in the 2014 Disney animated feature Big Hero 6, voiced by Ryan Potter. Speaking of the character, co-director Don Hall said "Hiro is transitioning from boy to man, it's a tough time for a kid and some teenagers develop that inevitable snarkiness and jaded attitude. Luckily Ryan is a very likeable kid. So no matter what he did, he was able to take edge off the character in a way that made him authentic, but appealing."

This version of Hiro is a 14-year-old robotics prodigy who participates in underground robot battles. His older brother Tadashi, a student at the San Fransokyo Institute of Technology, inspires him to redirect his efforts toward gaining acceptance to its research program. After Tadashi is killed in a fire and explosion on the campus, Hiro becomes withdrawn and depressed. He later forms the Big Hero 6 team with Tadashi's fellow researchers and Baymax, an inflatable healthcare robot built by Tadashi, to stop Yokai.

Hiro initially lacks a social life and appears to suffer from intellectual boredom. After Tadashi's urging and meeting with his friends, he becomes more open and accepting to those around him and tries to be friendly. He also decides to be a hero out of necessity as opposed to being unwillingly forced into the occupation. He also wears purple armor that, by itself, serves no function besides protection. When paired with Baymax, the suit magnetizes to his back and allows Hiro to control him while flying.

=== Television ===
Hiro Hamada appears in the spin-off series Big Hero 6: The Series and Baymax!, with Ryan Potter reprising the role.

=== Video games ===
- Hiro Hamada appears as a playable character in Disney Infinity 2.0 and Disney Infinity 3.0.
- Hiro Hamada appears as an unlockable playable character in Disney Magic Kingdoms.
- Hiro Hamada appears as a playable character in Disney Heroes: Battle Mode.
- Hiro Hamada appears in Kingdom Hearts III, voiced by Ryan Potter in the English version and Yutaro Honjo in Japanese.
- An alternate universe variant of Hiro Hamada appears as a playable character in Disney Mirrorverse.
- Hiro Hamada appears as a playable character in Disney Speedstorm.

=== Other appearances ===
- Hiro Hamada makes a non-speaking cameo appearance in Ralph Breaks the Internet.
- Hiro Hamada makes a non-speaking cameo appearance in Once Upon a Studio.
