= Big Hero 6: The Series =

American animated superhero television series

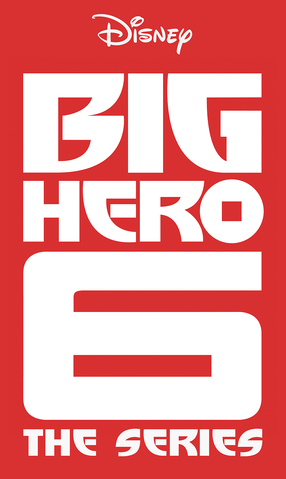
- Genre: Science fiction comedy Superhero
- Created by: Mark McCorkle; Bob Schooley
- Based on: Big Hero 6 by Walt Disney Animation Studios; Big Hero 6 by Marvel Comics
- Developed by: Mark McCorkle; Bob Schooley; Nick Filippi
- Voices of: Scott Adsit; Ryan Potter; Jamie Chung; Genesis Rodriguez; Khary Payton; Brooks Wheelan; Maya Rudolph
- Theme music composer: Adam Berry
- Composer: Adam Berry
- Country of origin: United States
- Original language: English
- No. of seasons: 3
- No. of episodes: 60 (list of episodes)

Production
- Executive producers: Bob Schooley; Mark McCorkle; Nick Filippi
- Running time: 23 minutes (Note: During the third season of the series, episodes would consist of two 11-minute segments, with the exception of the episode "Hyper-Potamus Pizza-Party-Torium", which is not split); 45 minutes (special episodes)
- Production company: Disney Television Animation

Original release
- Network: Disney Channel; Disney XD
- Release: November 20, 2017 – February 15, 2021

Related
- Big Hero 6 (2014); Baymax! (2022)

Big Hero 6: The Series is an American superhero science fiction comedy television series that aired between November 20, 2017, and February 15, 2021. The show was produced by Disney Television Animation and was created by Mark McCorkle and Bob Schooley, also known for co-creating Buzz Lightyear of Star Command and Kim Possible. The show is based on Disney's 2014 film Big Hero 6, which itself is loosely based on the comic book series of the same name published by Marvel Comics. The show acts as a follow-up to the original film and uses traditional hand-drawn animation.

It premiered with a 43-minute episode titled "Baymax Returns" on Disney XD on November 20, 2017. In 2018, the series was moved from Disney XD to Disney Channel before the series premiere. The series formally premiered with two new episodes on Disney Channel on June 9, 2018. Many debate whether the animation is canon to the Movie. This is highly disputed by the creators.

The second season premiered on May 6, 2019, with a third season confirmed prior. The third season premiered on September 21, 2020, on Disney XD. The third season features predominantly 11-minute episodes, as opposed to the 22-minute episodes of the first two seasons. The cast members stated on January 28, 2021, that the series would not return for a fourth season and the series finale aired on February 15, 2021.

In December 2020, Disney announced a spinoff series titled Baymax! and produced by Walt Disney Animation Studios. The series was released on Disney+ on June 29, 2022.

== Plot ==
The series is set after the events of Big Hero 6 (2014) and continues the adventures of 14-year-old tech genius Hiro Hamada and his compassionate, cutting-edge robot Baymax, a recreation of the original version built by his late older brother Tadashi. Along with his friends Wasabi, Honey Lemon, Go Go and Fred, they form the superhero team Big Hero 6 and embark on high-tech adventures as they protect their city from an array of scientifically enhanced villains. Hiro also faces academic challenges and social trials as the new prodigy at San Fransokyo Institute of Technology (SFIT).

The show slightly contradicts the ending of the original film. Among the changes, Aunt Cass knows about Baymax and Hiro continues attending SFIT as if everything is back to normal; though a building is erected after Tadashi, Hiro does not receive a grant from the institute. Hiro also does not come up with the name "Big Hero 6" like it is implied at the end of the film. Instead, Fred comes up with the name after having "brainstormed an epic list of team names" and testing them with himself.

== Voice cast and characters ==
- Ryan Potter as Hiro Hamada, a 14-year-old robotics prodigy whose older brother Tadashi Hamada was killed in an explosion at the San Fransokyo Institute of Technology (SFIT) and member of Big Hero 6; he serves as the team's unofficial leader. He wears a suit for protection and to hide his identity when he flies on Baymax.
- Scott Adsit as Baymax, an inflatable robot originally built by Tadashi as a medical assistant, but reprogrammed by Hiro to also use martial arts as a member of Big Hero 6; he wears a suit of armor with a jetpack and wings.
- Jamie Chung as Go Go Tomago, a tough, athletic student at SFIT and member of Big Hero 6 who specializes in electromagnetics; she uses two large discs as wheels/skates when in action, and also uses smaller discs as weapons.
- Genesis Rodriguez as Honey Lemon, a bubbly and optimistic student at SFIT, chemistry enthusiast, and member of Big Hero 6; she uses 'chem-balls' that produce a variety of effects.
- Khary Payton as Wasabi, a smart, slightly neurotic student at SFIT and member of Big Hero 6 who specializes in lasers, and has two laser-like blades on his arms when in action. He appreciates order and control in his life and work environment. Payton replaces Damon Wayans Jr., who voiced Wasabi in the film.
- Brooks Wheelan as Fred, a comic book fan and slacker who is also team mascot at SFIT and member of Big Hero 6, with reptilian super-suits; he lives in a large mansion that is owned by his parents. Wheelan replaces T.J. Miller, who voiced Fred in the film.
- Maya Rudolph as Aunt Cass, Hiro and Tadashi's aunt and guardian. She is obsessed with cooking new and strange dishes and is oblivious to Hiro's double life, as Hiro knows that she will "never let him out of the house" if he reveals this information.
- David Shaughnessy as Heathcliff, Fred's family butler, who assists the team in their training efforts.
- Alan Tudyk as Alistair Krei (Reprising his role from the 2016 film), a pioneer entrepreneur and CEO of Krei Tech. He is revealed to know Big Hero 6's secret identities after they saved his life in the film.
- Andrew Scott as Robert "Obake" Aken, A mysterious supervillain who prefers to work hidden in the shadows and the main antagonist of the series. He was once a student as SFIT who had lots of ideas on how to change the world, but one of his failed experiments resulted in an explosion that broke his temporoparietal junction, leaving him unable to tell the differences between right and wrong (while also causing the left side of his face to glow purple), after that day he would then plan to destroy San Fransokyo, and rebuild it in his own image by any means necessary.

== Development and production ==
In March 2016, Disney announced that a Big Hero 6 television series was in development and premiered on Disney Channel in 2017. The series takes place immediately after the events of the film and is created by Kim Possible's Mark McCorkle and Bob Schooley, and executive produced by McCorkle, Schooley and Nick Filippi. The show was reportedly pitched by McCorkle and Schooley shortly following the film's release. Talking to Leonard Maltin for the podcast Maltin on Movies, Scott Adsit suggested an early 2018 release date. McCorkle and Schooley were given the choice of making the show CGI-animated, but chose not to due to limitations they had experienced with their previous CGI cartoons like the Monsters vs. Aliens animated series.

In March 2016, it was revealed that Jamie Chung would reprise her role as Go Go, and that following November, it was revealed that most of the cast members from the film would reprise their roles, including Ryan Potter, Genesis Rodriguez, Scott Adsit, Alan Tudyk, and Maya Rudolph. Additionally, Khary Payton replaced Damon Wayans Jr. as Wasabi and Brooks Wheelan replaced T. J. Miller as Fred. On January 6, 2017, Disney Channel released an official teaser trailer for the series.

On March 14, 2017, it was renewed for a second season, ahead of the series premiere. On April 16, 2019, the series was renewed for a third season. According to Bob Schooley, the reason for Season 3 having eleven-minute episodes is the network wanting to focus more on comedy. As a result, a storyline focusing on the character of Karmi had to be scrapped.

On January 28, 2021, members of the cast stated that the show would not be picked up for a fourth season and would air its final episode on February 15, 2021.

== Episodes ==
Season	Episodes		Originally released	
Season	Episodes		First released	Last released
1	22		November 20, 2017	October 13, 2018
2	24	13	May 6, 2019	September 5, 2019
2	24	11	September 6, 2019	February 8, 2020
3	10 (Note: 19 segments; every episode following the season premiere "The Hyper-Potamus Pizza-Party-Torium" contains two 11 minute segments)		September 21, 2020	February 15, 2021

== Broadcast ==
Baymax Returns premiered on Disney Channel channels in Canada on November 20, 2017, and in the UK and Ireland on November 30, 2017.

The series formally premiered with two new episodes on Disney Channel on June 9, 2018, followed by two more new episodes on June 10, 2018, with weekly premieres every Saturday through September starting on June 16, 2018, with episodes airing at 7 a.m. starting on September 8.

Starting on May 6, episodes of the second season aired on weekdays at 3:30 p.m. Starting on September 3, 2019, first-run premieres aired on Disney XD weekdays at 7:30 a.m. Premieres on Disney Channel aired second-run weekdays at 3:30 p.m. Eventually, the series officially moved premieres back to Disney XD starting on January 4, 2020, until the series finale.

The series is also available on Disney's streaming service, Disney+.

== Home media ==
Big Hero 6: The Series home video releases
Season		Episodes	Release dates
Season		Episodes	Region 1
1	2017–18	22	Volume 1: Back in Action: June 26, 2018; Episode(s): "Baymax Returns" – "Failure Mode"
Special features
Back in Action (Region 1): All six "Baymax and" shorts

== Reception ==
Den of Geek gave the series' pilot "Baymax Returns" a 5/5, praising the show for its humor and stating that "Big Hero 6 The Series has the potential to be Disney’s best movie to TV series yet and that says something coming off true classics like the Aladdin and Hercules animated series (which the executive producers of Big Hero 6 The Series worked on)."

== Awards and nominations ==
Year	Award	Category	Nominee(s)	Result	Ref.
2018	Annie Award	Outstanding Achievement for Production Design in an Animated Television / Broadcast Production	Mark Taihei, Ben Plouffe, Chris Whittier, Sylvia Filcak, Amy Chen	Nominated	
2018	70th Primetime Creative Arts Emmy Awards	Outstanding Animated Program	"Baymax Returns"	Nominated	
2019	46th Daytime Creative Arts Emmy Awards	Outstanding Sound Editing for an Animated Program	Robert Poole II, Robbi Smith, David Bonilla, Rich Danhakl and J Lampinen	Nominated	
2019	Annie Award	Outstanding Editorial team in an Animated Television / Broadcast Production	Charles Jones, Joe Molinari, Dao Le, Vartan Nazarian, David Vazquez	Won	
2020	Annie Award	Best Editorial in TV/Media	Dao Le, Joe Molinari, Charles T. Jones, David Vasquez (for Prey Date)	Nominated	
2020	47th Daytime Emmy Awards	Outstanding Writing Program for an Animated Series		Nominated	
2020	47th Daytime Emmy Awards	Outstanding Original Song in a Children's, Young Adult, or Animated Program	"Gonna Go Good"	Nominated	

== Comic book series ==
A comic book series based on Big Hero 6: The Series was announced to be published by IDW Publishing, making it one of the few times Marvel Comics has allowed another comic book company to use their characters. The comic book series was initially titled after the film and set to be released in July 2018 from Hannah Blumenreich (writer) and Nicoletta Baldari (artist). However, the release kept getting pushed back. Since then, the comic has been retitled after the show and was released on November 13, 2019 with Blumenreich and Baldari still attached. Its follow up issues would not get released until close to a year later.

A manga series by Yen Press was released in August 2021 and is written and illustrated by Hong Gyun An. The first volume adapts the episodes "Issue 188", "Failure Mode" and "Baymax Returns Part 1", but has it feel more connected and linear.
