= Baymax! =

American superhero streaming television series

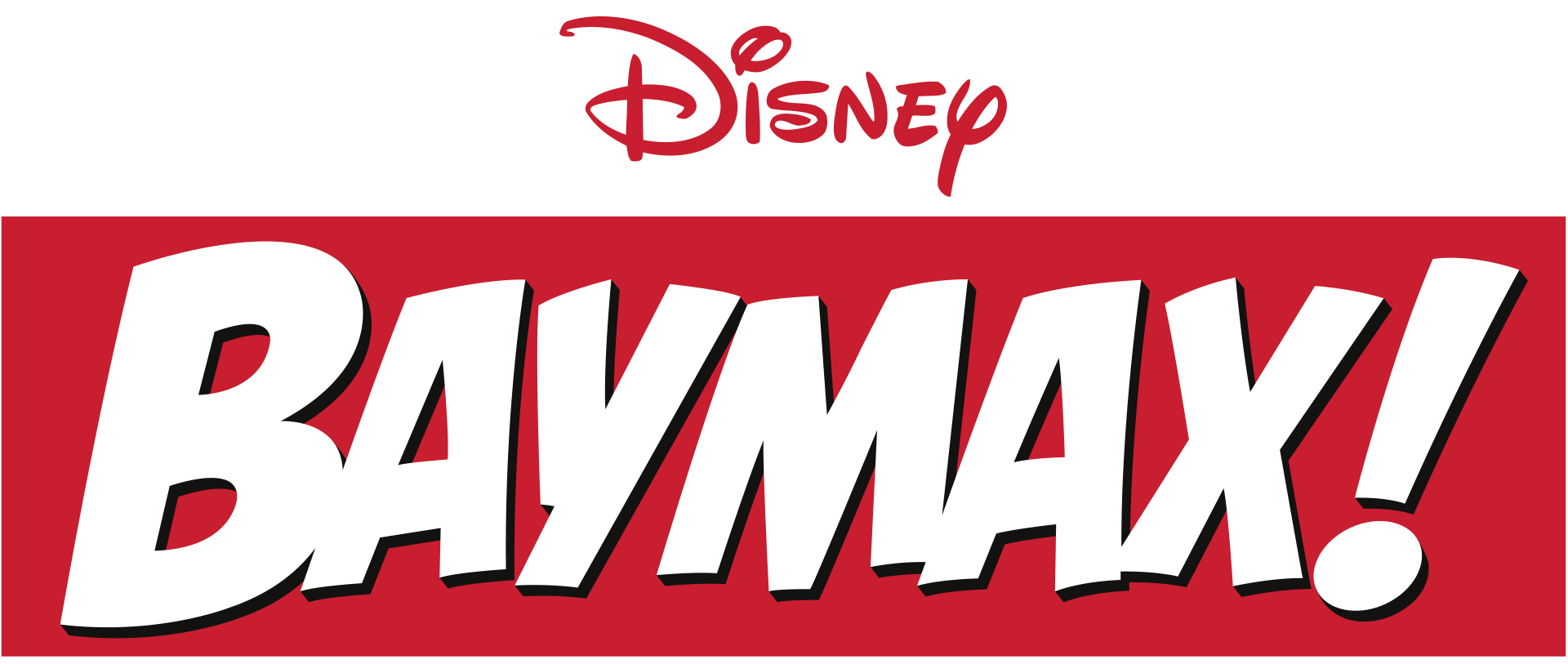
- Genre: Superhero; Science fiction comedy
- Created by: Don Hall
- Based on: Big Hero 6 by Marvel Comics; Big Hero 6 by Walt Disney Animation Studios
- Written by: Cirocco Dunlap
- Voices of: Scott Adsit; Ryan Potter; Maya Rudolph; Zeno Robinson; Emily Kuroda; Lilimar; Jaboukie Young-White
- Composer: Dominic Lewis
- Country of origin: United States
- Original language: English
- No. of episodes: 6

Production
- Executive producers: Jennifer Lee; Don Hall; Roy Conli (4–6)
- Producers: Roy Conli (1–3); Bradford Simonsen (4–6)
- Cinematography: Jennifer Yu Farr; Scott Beattie; Rob Dressel
- Editors: Sarah K. Reimers; Shannon Stein
- Running time: 10–11 minutes
- Production company: Walt Disney Animation Studios

Original release
- Network: Disney+
- Release: June 29, 2022

Related
- Big Hero 6 (2014); Big Hero 6: The Series (2017–21)

Baymax! is an American computer animated superhero science fiction comedy television miniseries created by Don Hall that premiered on Disney+ on June 29, 2022, featuring the Marvel Comics character of the same name. The series is a spin-off of the animated feature film Big Hero 6 (2014), and the second television series set in the film's continuity following Big Hero 6: The Series (2017–2021). The series was the first television series produced by Walt Disney Animation Studios.

== Synopsis ==
The series follows healthcare companion robot Baymax as he helps people in the city of San Fransokyo.

== Voice cast ==
- Scott Adsit as Baymax, a robot created by Tadashi, Hiro's late brother.
- Ryan Potter as Hiro Hamada, a student at San Fransokyo Institute of Technology.
- Maya Rudolph as Aunt Cass, Hiro's aunt.
- Zeno Robinson as Ali, Sofia's friend.
- Emily Kuroda as Kiko, a patient.
- Lilimar as Sofia, a middle school patient.
- Jaboukie Young-White as Mbita
- Brian Tee as Yukio

== Episodes ==
All episodes are written by Cirocco Dunlap.

No.	Title	Directed by	Animation supervised by	Original release date
1	"Cass"	Dean Wellins	David Stodolny and Malerie Walters	June 29, 2022
Aunt Cass sprains her ankle while working at the Lucky Cat Café. Baymax puts her out of commission while he runs the business, but Cass refuses to sit down and tries to help her customers, only for Baymax to continuously stop her. Cass sprains her ankle even worse and admits that she is afraid of losing customers. Baymax comforts her and she learns that the customers made a get well video for her until she recovers.
2	"Kiko"	Dean Wellins	David Stodolny and Malerie Walters	June 29, 2022
Retiree Kiko Tanaka is confronted by Baymax after she yelps in pain. He suggests going to the swimming center next door, but she refuses, claiming she has aquaphobia. Baymax tries to "help" her, and she proceeds to follow him to pop him. However, they end up in the swimming center and Kiko admits that she has sad memories of not joining her deceased husband in swimming. Baymax offers to swim with her and she agrees.
3	"Sofia"	Lissa Treiman	David Stodolny and Malerie Walters	June 29, 2022
Pre-teen Sofia has her first period just before the talent show. Baymax arrives and offers his help by going out and buying her tampons. Her friend Ali tries to offer support, but to no avail. Sofia admits that she is afraid of growing up and changing, but Baymax tells her that just because her body is changing, does not mean she has to. With newfound confidence Sofia rejoins Ali for the talent show.
4	"Mbita"	Dan Abraham	Henry Sanchez and Boris Maras	June 29, 2022
Mbita runs a food truck that only serves fish soup. On an ordinary day, Mbita is shocked to discover that he has an allergic reaction to fish. He attempts to outrun Baymax who is trying to help him, and he manages to calm down and voices his fear of embracing change. Baymax gives him the confidence he needs to change his menu options and even asks out fellow vendor Yukio on a date.
5	"Yachi" (Part 1)	Mark Kennedy	Henry Sanchez and Boris Maras	June 29, 2022
A stray cat named Yachi accidentally swallows a bluetooth earphone. Baymax then proceeds to follow the cat throughout San Fransokyo, while Yachi visibly wishes for a home. Baymax chases her into a condemned warehouse and manages to catch and rub the earphone out of her. However, Baymax begins to suffer from low battery and fails to reach a charger. Yachi steals his lollipop and leaves him behind.
6	"Baymax" (Part 2)	Dean Wellins	Henry Sanchez and Boris Maras	June 29, 2022
Hiro realizes that Baymax has not returned home. He recruits Cass, Kiko, Mbita and Sofia, based on where Baymax has been, and they go searching for him. Kiko finds Yachi and she leads them to the warehouse that is about to be demolished. Together, the group make a plan to rescue Baymax and successfully do so. They return him to his charger where he tells them that he is "satisfied with his care".

== Production ==
=== Development ===
On December 10, 2020, Walt Disney Animation Studios chief creative officer Jennifer Lee announced during an Investor's Day livestream that a new show entitled Baymax!, based on the 2014 film Big Hero 6 was in development for Disney+. Big Hero 6 co-director Don Hall would serve as creator and co-executive producer, the latter alongside Lee, for the series. The idea for a Baymax series was pitched by Hall, who "thought it would be fun to do a Disney+ series with Baymax interacting with normal folks". He also wanted the series to center on Baymax due to feeling that its predecessor, Big Hero 6: The Series, "had explored so many great roads" and characters within the franchise's universe. Big Hero 6 producer Roy Conli returned to produce.

It was the first television series to ever be produced by Walt Disney Animation Studios; and was also the first spinoff series to actually be produced by the studio itself, as most television series based on films in the Disney animated features canon - including Big Hero 6: The Series - are mainly done by Disney Television Animation. As such, the production team had to adapt to working in an episodic storytelling format, which Conli described as "a great exercise in storytelling" that gave the studio "the opportunity to tell stories in different ways". The producers also used the episodic format as a way to allow employees within the studio to make their directorial debuts. Several story artists from the film pitched approximately 20 ideas for stories, of which they picked six that followed a "thematic arc". Some of the artists who did pitches were hired to direct episodes based on their ideas.

=== Writing ===
The series centers on Baymax's main programming as a nurse robot, exploring the city of San Fransokyo and finding patients that "don't want to be helped", with series writer Cirocco Dunlap adding that their refusal comes from denial, stating that "[they're] scared, [they] don't want to face reality, [they] can't afford the consequences — the denial runs deep". Hall said that, through the series, Baymax attempts to help people with their physical ailments "and in the process, gets to a deeper, more emotional place" that allows his patients to grow as people. Associate producer Bradford Simonsen said they wanted Baymax to be good-intentioned but näive, and that the stories for every episode developed in unexpected yet heartfelt ways, and Hall described the series as centering on the relationship between Baymax and his patients. Hall's pitch for the series was more comedic in tone, with the more emotional aspects being added by Dunlap after he asked her to write the series. Both Hall and Conli felt Dunlap's contributions made the series closer in tone to the original film.

The producers wanted to depict the topics featured in each episode in a careful manner. For the third episode, they wanted to avoid depicting menstrual periods as shameful, with Dunlap describing its depiction as important to her. Similarly, for the fourth episode, they aimed to depict fish allergy as something alarming while audiences were still able to enjoy the episode. Unlike the film, the series does not feature superhero elements, with Hall instead wanting it to be more reminiscent of the medical procedurals he watched in his childhood.

=== Casting ===
On May 20, 2022, it was confirmed that Scott Adsit, Ryan Potter, and Maya Rudolph would reprise their roles as Baymax, Hiro, and Cass, respectively, while it was also announced that Zeno Robinson, Lilimar, Jaboukie Young-White, and Emily Kuroda joined the cast. Lilimar was cast after the producers heard her audition tape, after which they felt she was able to accurately portray the character's intelligence and age.

=== Animation ===
According to visual effects supervisor Mohit Kallianpur, the animators reused assets from Big Hero 6, but the data had to be updated due to changes in technology since the film's release. After converting the data, the animators tested it and treated any errors found. Conli further explained that the animators reused models from the film when possible, and created new models when required.

For the designs of the new characters, the animators reused models featured in crowds from the original film. According to Simonsen, the process required coordination with the directors; while the directors were developing the story for each episode, the producers would give them a series of background characters they felt would fit the story, after which the directors would pick the model.

=== Music ===
Dominic Lewis, who previously provided additional music for the original film, composed the score for the series by May 2022. The soundtrack for the series was released on June 29, 2022.

Baymax!

Soundtrack album by Dominic Lewis
- Released: June 29, 2022
- Recorded: 2021–2022
- Genre: Soundtrack
- Length: 30:48
- Label: Walt Disney
- Producer: Dominic Lewis

==== Track listing ====
No.	Title	Length
1.	"Baymax"	0:32
2.	"Water Phobia"	0:39
3.	"Let's Go Kiko"	1:33
4.	"Truth"	1:49
5.	"The Lucky Cat"	0:59
6.	"New Employee"	1:14
7.	"Secret Worker"	0:50
8.	"All Love"	1:52
9.	"Bandages"	1:51
10.	"Choices Choices"	0:56
11.	"Creciendo"	2:37
12.	"Fish Fingers"	1:17
13.	"Ladle of Love"	2:24
14.	"Yachi"	2:16
15.	"Out of B B B Battery"	1:17
16.	"Recruits"	1:59
17.	"Cat-astrophe Avoided"	4:40
18.	"Little Hero 6"	1:53
Total length:		30:48

== Release ==
Baymax! was released on June 29, 2022, on Disney+, and consists of six episodes. The first episode premiered on June 17, 2022, during the Annecy Film Festival.

=== Marketing ===
The teaser trailer was released by Walt Disney Animation Studios' YouTube channel on November 12, 2021, which was Disney+ Day. An official trailer was released on May 20, 2022, during the National Streaming Day.

== Reception ==
=== Audience viewership ===
According to Whip Media's viewership tracking app TV Time, Baymax! was the fifth most anticipated new television series of June 2022.

=== Critical reception ===
On the review aggregator website Rotten Tomatoes, the series holds a rating of 100% fresh based on six critics, with an average rating of 8.3/10.

Sam Stone of CBR.com felt creator and Big Hero 6 co-director Don Hall brought "the same attention to detail, effortless charm, and genuine heart" to the series as the original film, praising its emotional depth and short runtime, which Stone felt prevented the series from becoming formulaic. Jeff Ewing of Forbes described the series as "an unsurprisingly gorgeous season", calling the episodes "cute" and able to capture the titular character's charm, highlighting "Sofia" and "Mbita" as the series' "most touching episodes", and praising its animation and voice acting, though he felt the series was not able to properly expand the franchise's universe. Raven Brunner of Game Rant said that the series "embraces the naivety and wholeheartedness of adolescence while further developing the Big Hero 6 world" and that "is a delightful reintroduction" to the Big Hero 6 franchise. She also praised the final episode for allowing the stories from the previous episodes to "eventually [come] together in a way that is deeply reflective of the show's values", as well as the series' racial and LGBTQ+ diversity.

Polly Conway of Common Sense Media rated the series 4 out of 5 stars, praised the depiction of positive messages and role models, citing persistence and empathy, and complimented the diverse representations across the characters. Matt Fowler of IGN rated the first season of the series 8 out of 10, found agreeable the interactions between the characters, and praised the show for its humor and animation, writing, "Baymax! is light, fluffy short-form warmth that humorously fulfills our need to feel taken care of, watched after, and held accountable."

The third episode "Sofia" aroused controversy and criticism due to its depiction of a transgender man wearing a trans pride shirt and discussing his preferred type of pad. Others praised the depiction.

=== Accolades ===
Award	Date of Ceremony	Category	Nominee(s)	Result	Ref.
Annie Awards	February 5, 2023	Best TV/Media - Limited Series	"Sofia"	Nominated	
Annie Awards	February 5, 2023	Best Direction - TV/Media	Lissa Treiman	Nominated	
Annie Awards	February 5, 2023	Best Writing - TV/Media	Cirocco Dunlap	Nominated	
Children's and Family Emmy Awards	December 16–17, 2023	Outstanding Children's or Young Teen Animated Series	Baymax	Nominated	
Children's and Family Emmy Awards	December 16–17, 2023	Outstanding Writing for an Animated Program	Cirocco Dunlap	Won	
Children's and Family Emmy Awards	December 16–17, 2023	Outstanding Directing for an Animated Program	Dean Wellins	Nominated	
Children's and Family Emmy Awards	December 16–17, 2023	Outstanding Editing for an Animated Program	Sarah Reimers and Shannon Stein	Won	
Golden Trailer Awards	October 6, 2022	Best Animation/Family for a TV/Streaming Series	Baymax	Nominated	
