= Big Hero 6 (comics) =

Marvel Comics superhero team

- Cover to Sunfire and Big Hero 6 #1. Featured are Sunfire in the center, along with (clockwise) Silver Samurai, GoGo Tomago, Honey Lemon, Hiro Takachiho, and Baymax. Art by Gus Vasquez.

Publication information
- Publisher: Marvel Comics
- First appearance: Sunfire & Big Hero 6 #1 (Sept. 1998)
- Created by: Steven T. Seagle; Duncan Rouleau

In-story information
- Base(s): Cool World Amusement Park in Japan
- Member(s): Hiro Takachiho; Honey Lemon; GoGo Tomago; Baymax; Wasabi-No-Ginger; Fredzilla; Ebon Samurai; Silver Samurai; Sunfire; Sunpyre

Big Hero 6 is a superhero team appearing in American comic books published by Marvel Comics and created by Man of Action.

== Publication history ==
Created by Steven T. Seagle and Duncan Rouleau, Big Hero 6 was intended to first appear in Alpha Flight #17 (Dec. 1998). Instead, the team appeared in their own self-titled, three-issue miniseries by writer Scott Lobdell and artist Gus Vasquez. Due to scheduling complications, the miniseries was published prior to Alpha Flight #17.

The team appears in Alpha Flight #9 (January 2005), as well as a five-issue miniseries launched by Marvel Comics in September 2008.

== Fictional biography ==
The Japanese government, in need of a team of state-sanctioned superheroes, consults the Giri, a top-secret consortium of politicians and corporations formed to recruit and train potential recruits for Big Hero 6, a team of superhuman operatives. Despite reservations from some members of the Giri, Silver Samurai, a freelance ronin and former bodyguard of the terrorist Viper, is appointed as the team's field commander. Secret agent Honey Lemon, inventor of the nanotechnology-based Power Purse, which allows her access to any object, agrees to join the team, as does GoGo Tomago, who possesses the ability to transform her body into a fiery force blast and is released from prison on the condition that she serve the team. Finally, Machiavellian bureaucrat Mr. Oshima is appointed as the Giri's spokesperson and coordinator of the team's activities.

Government scientists then identify 13-year-old boy genius Hiro Takachiho as a potential operative. Unimpressed with the Silver Samurai, Hiro refuses to join the team until his mother is kidnapped by the Everwraith, the astral embodiment of those killed in the bombings of Hiroshima and Nagasaki. He creates Baymax, a synthetic bodyguard capable of transforming into a dragon, using the brain engrams of his deceased father, Tomeo. Along with Baymax, Hiro reluctantly joins forces with Big Hero 6 to stop the Everwraith from attacking downtown Tokyo. During the battle, Big Hero 6 is joined by Sunfire, Japan's premier superhero, a mutant with the ability to heat matter into plasma who helps them defeat the Everwraith.

Soon after, they relocate their headquarters from the Giri office building to Japan's Cool World Amusement Park. There, they are attacked by X the Unknowable, a monster born from a child's drawings that is capable of transforming its atomic structure into any form and shape. With help from Canadian superhero team Alpha Flight, Big Hero 6 destroys it in the fires of Mount Fuji. Afterwards, they continue to protect Japan from various threats, such as a freak blizzard caused by the Crimson Cowl and her Masters of Evil.

Eventually, Sunfire leaves Big Hero 6 to work at Charles Xavier's X-Corporation office in Mumbai, India. His spot on the team is filled by Sunpyre, a young woman with solar-based powers who was pulled into this reality through the Power Purse and comes to idolize Honey Lemon. Similarly, after Silver Samurai is seemingly killed in a battle with the assassin Elektra in Iraq, his spot on the team is filled by Ebon Samurai. With the two most experienced members of Big Hero 6 gone, Hiro becomes its new leader.

Sometime during the team's operation, they are attacked by minions of Yandroth, who, as part of a plan to gain power through superhero battles, sends a team of "Living Erasers" to attack them, which are capable of transporting beings out of reality.

Later, the members of Big Hero 6 fall under the control of a mind-control device hidden within Baymax. In Canada, they attack a new incarnation of Alpha Flight at a national park. After a brief battle, the mind-control device is short-circuited and the two teams part as friends, with Big Hero 6 returning to Japan to seek out those responsible for their mind control.

During the "Ends of the Earth" storyline, Spider-Man calls upon Big Hero 6 to help him defeat Doctor Octopus. The team, now operating from the Giri Institute, confront Doctor Octopus' Octobots, which he had sent to Japan, and subsequently confront and defeat their previous enemy, the Everwraith.

== Team roster ==
=== Silver Samurai ===
Silver Samurai (Kenuichio Harada), the illegitimate son of Shingen Yashida, is a Japanese mutant with the power to charge almost anything, most notably his katana, with mutant energy, which is described as a tachyon field and allows it to slice through all substances except for adamantium. He wears a suit of traditional samurai armor made from a silver metal, hence the name "Silver Samurai".

Once the bodyguard for the international terrorist Viper, and later an occasional mercenary, he later became the head of Clan Yashida after his half-sister Mariko Yashida's death and attempted to pay off its debts to the yakuza and restore its honor. Though formerly one of Wolverine's enemies, he impressed Wolverine and he entrusted him with the care of his adopted daughter, Amiko Kobayashi. He also helped Wolverine destroy the monster Doombringer and rescue Amiko and Yukio from their kidnappers. During his time as a hero, the Silver Samurai became the leader of the Big Hero 6.

Silver Samurai later became the bodyguard of the Japanese prime minister, but was killed defending his family from a ninja attack.

=== Sunfire ===
Sunfire (Shiro Yoshida) was a former member of the X-Men and a former nationalist who changed his views after the death of his father and possesses the ability to fly and generate super-heated blasts of plasma. He became one of Japan's most prominent heroes, but soon left Big Hero 6 to join the X-Corporation; however, he was disgraced after his past ties to Mystique and the Brotherhood of Evil Mutants were revealed. Sunfire has since appeared as a member of the Marauders and of the Uncanny Avengers.

=== GoGo Tomago ===
GoGo Tomago (Leiko Tanaka) is a member of Big Hero 6 who possesses the ability to transform her body into an explosive ball of energy, which can be projected at high speeds.

=== Honey Lemon ===
Honey Lemon wields the Power Purse, which allows her access to objects and other dimensions through wormholes.

=== Hiro Takachiho ===
Hiro Takachiho is a thirteen-year-old boy genius who created Baymax; after the departure of Silver Samurai and Sunfire, he becomes the leader of Big Hero 6.

=== Baymax ===
Originally created by Hiro as a science project, Baymax was designed to be a hydro-powered robotic synthformer and serve as Hiro's bodyguard. However, before the project was completed, Hiro's father died, and he used his brain engrams to program Baymax's artificial intelligence. Now possessing his thoughts and emotions, Baymax became more than a bodyguard, as he also became a friend and father figure to Hiro. Baymax also feels a deep connection to Hiro's mother, Maemi; however, he and Hiro decided that it was best not to inform her of Baymax's true origins.

=== Ebon Samurai ===
In his previous life, the Ebon Samurai (Kiochi Keishicho) was a Tokyo police officer who was killed by Silver Samurai during an attack by Hydra. After making a deal with Amatsu-Mikaboshi, Kiochi was allowed to return to Earth and take revenge on Silver Samurai. Wielding a demonic katana and bonded to a black variant of Silver Samurai's armor, Kiochi was reborn as the Ebon Samurai. After learning that Silver Samurai had become the bodyguard of the Japanese prime minister, Kiochi abandoned his quest for revenge after realizing that killing him would be a betrayal of his country. Although he joins the team, he later leaves to accompany Sunpyre when she returns to the Microverse.

=== Sunpyre ===
A version of Sunfire's deceased sister Leyu from an alternate reality, Lumina is the crown princess of Coronar, a planet in the Microverse. As a result of being pulled out of the Microverse through Honey Lemon's purse, Sunpyre worships her as a goddess and joins Big Hero 6 out of gratitude. She and Ebon Samurai later leave the team to return to the Microverse and fight the villains who had taken over Coronar in her absence.

=== Wasabi-No-Ginger ===
A member of Big Hero 6. He is a trained chef who wields various swords and can also give form to his Qi-Energy, usually materializing it as throwing knives that can paralyze opponents.

=== Fred ===
A member of Big Hero 6, who is nicknamed Fredzilla. He can transform into a kaiju and manifest an aura of his kaiju form while untransformed.

== Supporting characters ==
- Maemi Takachiho – Hiro's mother and the widow of the deceased Tomeo Takachiho. She is aware of Hiro's heroic adventures and wants him to have a normal childhood. She is unaware that Baymax's brain patterns are based on Tomeo.
- Mr. Oshima – A member of the Giri who attempts to recruit Hiro into Big Hero 6 and serves as Giri's spokesperson and coordinator of the team's activities .
- Furi Wamu – A Japanese Homeland Security agent and Big Hero 6's liaison, who monitors them to ensure that they do not cause trouble. She wears an eyepatch due to an incident involving Badgal and has a prosthetic eye.
- Principal Miyazaki – Hiro's principal at the Tesuka Advanced Science Institute.
- Marys Iosama – A girl genius who bonds with Hiro and becomes his love interest.
- Dr. Keigi Iosama – Marys' father, who works undercover.

== Villains ==
The following are enemies of Big Hero 6 and are listed in order of their debut:

- Everwraith – The first villain Big Hero 6 faced and the closest thing to their arch-nemesis. He is a spectral spirit that encompasses those who died in the bombings of Hiroshima and Nagasaki. Everwraith is able to fly, become intangible, and fire energy blasts.
- X the Unknowable – A monster willed into reality by comic book writer Charles Bentley through his magic typewriter. He was initially destroyed after Bentley destroyed the typewriter, but he is brought back into existence by the boy Tomi, who was writing a comic book about him. He supposedly turns into a human after sinking into a volcano and marries a beautiful princess.
- Deadline (Dr. Kishi Oramosha) – A misguided scientist who created a doomsday device that would give everyone in the world a "deadline" before they would have to bring universal peace. He is stopped by Sunfire in his first appearance. He later reappears and attempts to recreate his experiment, but is stopped by a new rendition of Big Hero 6.
- Badgal – A woman with a mysterious past who can manipulate energy and create three personality constructs, Brute, Whiplash, and Gunsmith, which she can control when they possess other people. She attempts to steal six crystal artifacts, but is stopped by Big Hero 6 despite her attempts to possess them.

== In other media ==
=== Disney franchise ===
==== Film adaptation ====
The Big Hero 6 comics were adapted into the 2014 Disney animated film of the same name. Produced by Walt Disney Animation Studios, it retains some of the core themes and character concepts from the comics, but makes changes and builds a new story around them. For example, the film's version of Baymax is a friendly robot originally designed to provide medical care, while in the comics he is a bodyguard. The film was released in the United States in November 2014, receiving critical acclaim. It won the Academy Award for Best Animated Feature and was nominated for the Annie Award for Best Animated Feature and the Golden Globe Award for Best Animated Feature Film.

==== Television ====
Big Hero 6: The Series, an animated series set after the events of the 2014 film, premiered on Disney XD in 2017 and ran for three seasons until 2021. It is created by Mark McCorkle and Bob Schooley, creators of Kim Possible, and executive produced by McCorkle, Schooley, and Nick Filippi. Another series based on the film, Baymax!, was released on Disney+ in June 2022.

==== Video games ====
The Disney versions of Hiro and Baymax are playable in the game Disney Infinity 2.0, with the film's characters also appearing in Big Hero 6: Battle in the Bay. The Big Hero 6 characters has appeared in the mobile games Disney Heroes: Battle Mode, Disney Magic Kingdoms, Disney Mirrorverse, Disney Sorcerer's Arena, and Disney Emoji Blitz. They also appear in the Kingdom Hearts series in Kingdom Hearts III.

==== Theme park attractions ====
The Happy Ride with Baymax, a rotating car ride based on Baymax, opened in September 2020 at Tokyo Disneyland. San Fransokyo Square is a themed area at Disney California Adventure which opened in August 2023.
