= Jamie Chung =

American actress (born 1983)

- Chung in 2026
- Born: Jamie Jilynn Chung; April 10, 1983 (age 43); San Francisco, California, U.S.
- Education: University of California, Riverside (BA)
- Occupation: Actress
- Years active: 2004–present
- Spouse: Bryan Greenberg (m. 2015)
- Children: 2

Korean name
- Hangul: 정지린
- RR: Jeong Jirin
- MR: Chŏng Chirin
- Website: whatthechung.com

Jamie Jilynn Chung (born April 10, 1983) is an American actress and former reality television personality. She began her career in 2004 as a cast member on the MTV reality series The Real World: San Diego and subsequently through her appearances on its spin-off series, Real World/Road Rules Challenge: The Inferno II.

She later transitioned into acting and has since become known for films such as Dragonball Evolution, Grown Ups, Premium Rush, Sorority Row, The Hangover Part II, Sucker Punch, and Big Hero 6. Chung received critical acclaim for her lead performance in the independent drama film Eden. Chung played the lead role in the miniseries Samurai Girl, was a series regular in the superhero drama series The Gifted (2017–19), played the recurring role of Mulan in the ABC fantasy television series Once Upon a Time, and has been a series regular as the voice of Go Go Tomago for the animated Big Hero 6: The Series (2017–21), reprising her role from the 2014 film. In 2020, Chung appeared in the recurring role of Ji-Ah on the HBO series Lovecraft Country; in 2021, she was nominated for an Actors Award as part of the series' ensemble cast.

== Early life ==
Jamie Jilynn Chung was born April 10, 1983, in San Francisco, California, where she grew up. She and her older sister are second-generation Korean Americans. They were raised by "traditional" parents who moved to the United States in 1980 and ran a hamburger restaurant. She attended Commodore Sloat Elementary School and Aptos Middle School before attending Lowell High School in the fall of 1997. After graduating from Lowell High School in 2001, Chung attended and in 2005 graduated from the University of California, Riverside with a B.A. in economics. She was a member of Kappa Kappa Gamma sorority.

== Career ==
=== Reality television ===
Chung was a cast member on The Real World: San Diego, the 14th season of MTV's long-running reality TV show The Real World, which aired in 2004. At the time, MTV described her as a hard-working student who worked two jobs to pay her tuition but also enjoyed partying. She was also described by her friends as not having the best taste in men.

After appearing on The Real World, Chung appeared on its spin-off game show, Real World/Road Rules Challenge, as a cast member in that show's 2005 season, The Inferno II, during which she was a member of the "Good Guys" team, which squared off against the "Bad Asses". By the end of the season, after several cast members had been eliminated during the competition, Chung remained, along with her teammates Darrell Taylor, Landon Lueck, and Mike Mizanin. Chung and her teammates defeated the remaining members of the Bad Asses in the final event, and won the competition.

=== Acting ===
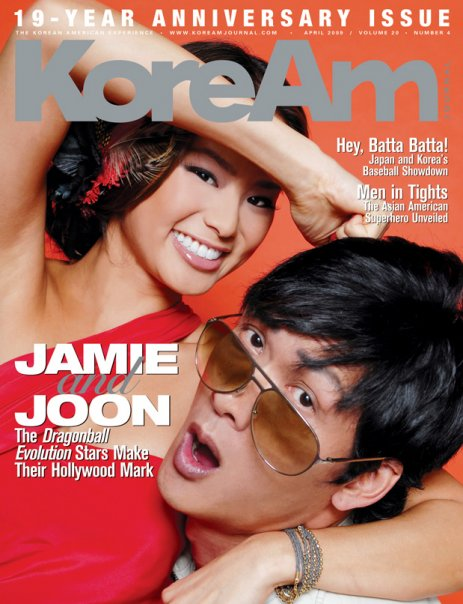
On the cover of KoreAm, April 2009, with Joon Park

After her stint on The Real World, Chung began her acting career with various minor roles in television and films, including as Cordy Han in ten episodes of Days of Our Lives, as a Hooters girl in the 2007 comedy I Now Pronounce You Chuck & Larry, and in episodes of CSI: NY and Veronica Mars.

One of Chung's earliest on-camera appearances was in the music video for Rihanna's single "Umbrella", as first woman to the right of Jay Z. The video premiered April 26, 2007. In 2008, Chung had her first major onscreen role, as the series lead in the ABC Family television miniseries Samurai Girl. In SFGate, her acting in this role was described as making "a promising bid for TV stardom." It also claimed that the show was an attempt to add more diversity to TV shows.

She had supporting roles in the 2009 feature films Sorority Row and Dragonball Evolution, in the latter as Goku's love interest, Chi-Chi, as well as the lead role in one of the segments of the film Burning Palms. Chung later starred in the Disney Channel TV film Princess Protection Program, which co-starred Demi Lovato and Selena Gomez. She appeared in 2010 film Grown Ups and had a supporting role in the 2012 martial arts film The Man with the Iron Fists.

In March 2011, Chung played Amber in Zack Snyder's action fantasy film Sucker Punch, which required her to undergo physical training with Navy SEALs and work with stunt and fight choreographers who had worked on Snyder's previous films. Chung stated that she was nervous about having to sing in the film: "I don't sing. I'm working on it, but just because I'm Korean doesn't mean I karaoke." She then provided the voice of Aimi Yoshida in the video game X-Men: Destiny, which was released that September.

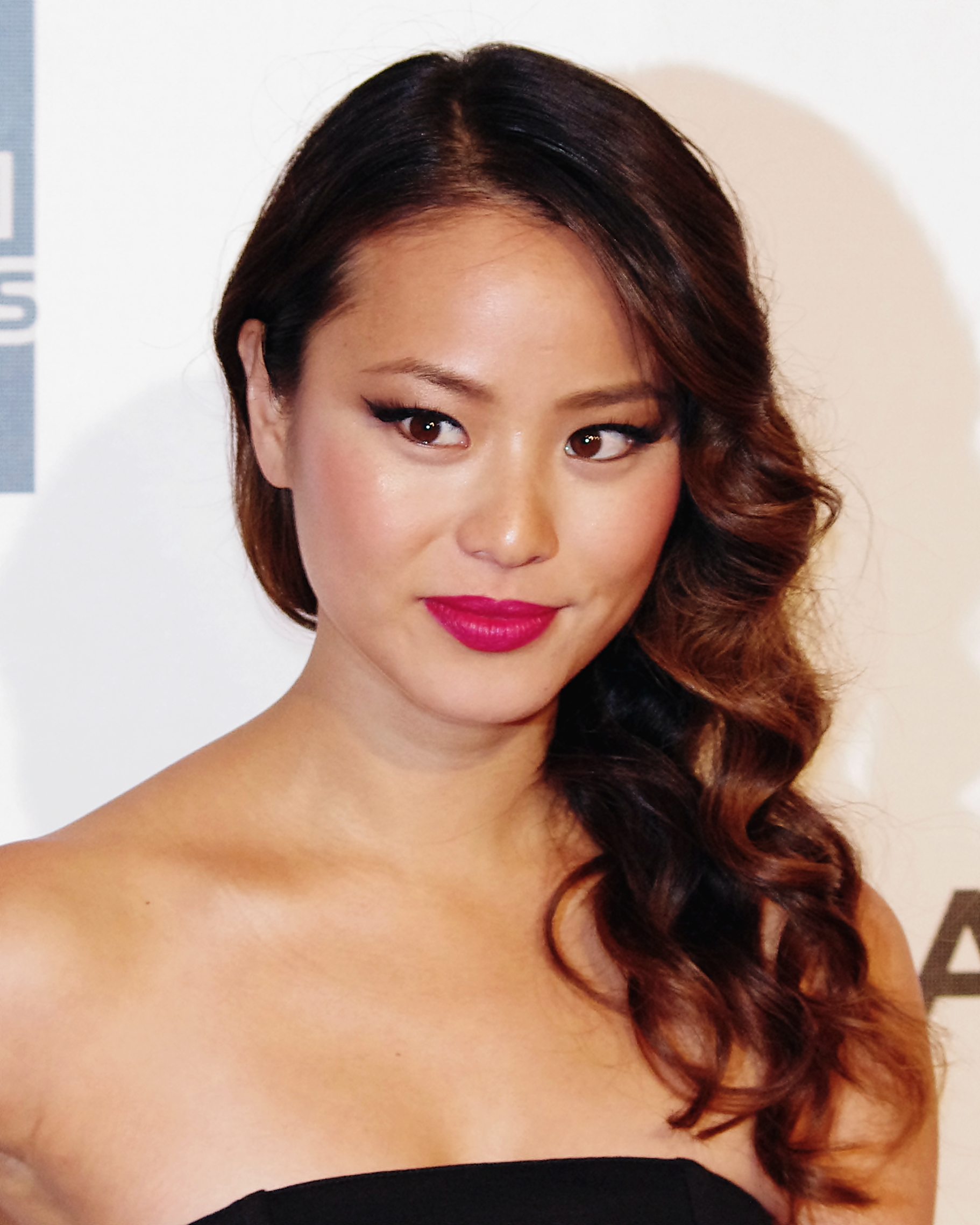
Chung at the 2012 Tribeca Film Festival premiere of Knife Fight

Chung gained her first major feature film role in the 2012 film Premium Rush, directed by David Koepp. That same year, she starred as the lead in the independent film Eden, in which she played a Korean American girl abducted and coerced into prostitution by American human traffickers. Since 2012, she has appeared in the recurring role of Mulan in the television series Once Upon a Time.

In 2014, Chung co-starred in Sin City: A Dame to Kill For, which was released that August, as Miho, a role that was played by Devon Aoki in the original Sin City. That October saw the release of the animated Disney film Big Hero 6, in which she provided the voice of GoGo Tomago. Big Hero 6 won the Academy Award for Best Animated Feature. She reprised the role in Disney XD's 2017 series Big Hero 6: The Series and in Kingdom Hearts III (2019).

Chung and her then-fiancé, Bryan Greenberg, co-starred in the film Already Tomorrow in Hong Kong, which was released in February 2015.

In March 2016, Chung was cast as attorney Lana Harris in the one-hour legal drama Miranda's Rights, but the series was not picked up by NBC after the pilot episode.

Chung was cast as Blink in the Fox superhero series The Gifted, which debuted in October 2017. She plays a younger version of the character played by Fan Bingbing in the 2014 feature film X-Men: Days of Future Past.

In August 2020, Chung appeared in the HBO series Lovecraft Country. She plays the recurring character Ji-Ah, a young nurse living in Daegu during the Korean War who falls in love with American soldier Atticus Freeman (Jonathan Majors). The series' sixth episode centers on Ji-Ah and garnered critical acclaim. Chung stated that this was her most challenging role to date. She added that her experience on the series inspired her to pitch her own show, which sold.

In 2023, Chung voiced Vax, a freedom fighter and recurring character in My Dad the Bounty Hunter.

Chung joined the cast of the Hulu comedy series Unprisoned in its second season, which spanned eight episodes, premiering on July 17, 2024.

=== Other work ===
Chung writes for her own fashion blog, What the Chung?

== Awards and recognition ==
On April 2, 2009, Chung won the Female Stars of Tomorrow Award at the 2009 ShoWest industry trade show along with her Sorority Row castmates.

At the 2012 Seattle International Film Festival, Chung won the Golden Space Needle Award for Best Actress for Eden.

Chung received a Screen Actors Guild Award nomination for her role in the series Lovecraft Country along her castmates.

== Personal life ==
Chung began dating actor and musician Bryan Greenberg in 2012. They became engaged in December 2013, and were married on October 31, 2015, in Santa Barbara, California. In 2019, Chung revealed that she had started the process of oocyte cryopreservation. In October 2021, she and Greenberg had twin sons who were born via surrogacy.

In 2013, they acquired a home in Manhattan, and in 2020, acquired a home in Brooklyn.

In 2023, through her appearance on Finding Your Roots, Chung learned that she is a direct descendant of Jeong Geum-gang. Born in the 1300s, he served in a high ranking government position equivalent to deputy prime minister during the Goryeo Dynasty. She also uncovered that according to legend in 1457 a distant ancestral cousin of hers, Eom Heung-do played a crucial role in the aftermath of Danjong of Joseon’s overthrow. Eom recovered the body of the deposed king, who had been executed by his uncle Sejo from a river in Yeongwol and provided him with a respectful burial. To escape retribution, he went into hiding for the remainder of his life. Honored by Koreans as a “loyal subject to the rightful king,” his courageous act continues to be commemorated annually in the village, where locals reenact the king's funeral. The town also features a statue depicting Eom holding Danjong's body.

In January 2025, Chung and Greenberg's house in Los Angeles was destroyed by the Southern California wildfires. They and their twin sons were unharmed.

== Filmography ==
=== Film ===
Year	Title	Role	Notes
2007	I Now Pronounce You Chuck and Larry	Hooters Girl	
2009	Dragonball Evolution	Chi Chi	
2009	Sorority Row	Claire	
2009	Burning Palms	Ginny Bai	
2010	Grown Ups	Amber Hilliard	
2011	Sucker Punch	Amber	
2011	The Hangover Part II	Lauren	
2012	Premium Rush	Nima	
2012	The Man with the Iron Fists	Lady Silk	
2012	Eden	Eden	
2012	Knife Fight	Kerstin	
2013	The Hangover Part III	Lauren Price	
2014	Flight 7500	Suzy Lee	
2014	Bad Johnson	Jamie	
2014	Sin City: A Dame to Kill For	Miho	
2014	Rudderless	Lisa Martin	
2014	Big Hero 6	Go Go Tomago	Voice
2015	A Year and Change	Pam	
2015	Already Tomorrow in Hong Kong	Ruby	Also executive producer
2016	Flock of Dudes	Katherine	
2016	Office Christmas Party	Meghan	
2017	Band Aid	Cassandra Diabla	
2018	1985	Carly	
2019	DC Showcase: Death	Death	Voice, short film
2020	Dangerous Lies	Julia	
2021	Batman: Soul of the Dragon	Jade Nguyen	Voice
2021	The Misfits	Violet	
2023	Justice League x RWBY: Super Heroes & Huntsmen, Part Two	Black Canary / Dinah Lance	Voice, direct-to-video
2024	Junction	Katie	
2024	Reunion	Jasmine Park	
2025	I'm Beginning to See the Light	Sarah Cooper	
2025	Stone Cold Fox	Officer Corbett	
TBA	Copperhead †	—N/a	Filming

=== Television ===
Year	Title	Role	Notes
2004	The Real World: San Diego	Herself	28 episodes
2005	Real World/Road Rules Challenge: The Inferno II	Herself / Challenge Winner	17 episodes
2006	Veronica Mars	Flirting Girl	Episode: "Spit & Eggs"
2007	Katrina	Ella	TV film
2007	ER	Jin Kim	Episode: "Under the Influence"
2007	Days of Our Lives	Cordy Han	10 episodes
2007	CSI: NY	Misty	Episode: "One Wedding and a Funeral"
2007–2008	Greek	The Tri Pi Sister / Sienna	2 episodes
2008	Samurai Girl	Heavan Kogo	Miniseries
2009	Castle	Romy Lee	Episode: "Hedge Fund Homeboys"
2009	Princess Protection Program	Chelsea Barnes	TV film
2010	Grey's Anatomy	Trina Paiz	Episode "Adrift and at Peace"
2012–2016	Once Upon a Time	Mulan	12 episodes, Seasons 2–3, 5 (recurring)
2014	Believe	Janice Channing	13 episodes, series regular
2015	Resident Advisors	Olivia	7 episodes, series regular
2016	Gotham	Valerie Vale	6 episodes; recurring role
2017–2021	Big Hero 6: The Series	Go Go Tomago, additional voices	Main voice role
2017–2019	The Gifted	Clarice Fong / Blink	Series regular; 29 episodes
2019	Sherwood	Rose Trefgarne	Main voice role
2020	Awkwafina Is Nora from Queens	Young Grandma	Episode: "Grandma & Chill"
2020	This is Us	Ava	Episode: "Honestly"
2020	Lovecraft Country	Ji-Ah	Regular role; 6 episodes
2021	Star Wars: Visions	Misa	Voice, short film: Akakiri: English language dub
2021–2022	Dexter: New Blood	Molly Park	7 episodes
2023	Finding Your Roots	Herself	Episode: "Far From Home"
2023	Succession	Beth	Episode: "Connor's Wedding"
2023	My Dad the Bounty Hunter	Vax	Voice
2024	Unprisoned	Kiki	Guest star
2024	Batman: Caped Crusader	Harley Quinn	Voice, 3 episodes
2024	Twilight of the Gods	Hel	Voice, 4 episodes
2025	Krapopolis	Princess Lycosa	Voice, episode: "Love Trap, Baby!"
2025	Reading Rainbow	Herself / Reader	Episode: "No Cats in the Library!"
2026	The Hunting Party	Nancy Albright	Episode: "Nancy Albright"
2026	Dexter: Resurrection	Molly Park	Voice, episode: "Live Free and Die" (uncredited)

=== Video games ===
Year	Title	Role
2009	Command & Conquer Red Alert 3: Uprising	Takara
2011	X-Men: Destiny	Aimi Yoshida
2018	Destiny 2 – Warmind	Ana Bray
2019	Kingdom Hearts III	Go Go Tomago
2026	Disney Speedstorm	Go Go Tomago
