= Don Hall (filmmaker) =

American filmmaker (born 1969)

- Born: Donald Lee Hall; March 8, 1969 (age 57); Glenwood, Iowa, U.S.
- Education: University of Iowa
- Occupations: Film director; voice actor; screenwriter
- Years active: 1995–present
- Employers: Walt Disney Animation Studios (1995–2024, 2026–present); Skydance Animation (2024–2026)
- Notable work: Meet the Robinsons; The Princess and the Frog; Winnie the Pooh; Big Hero 6; Moana; Raya and the Last Dragon; Strange World; Wish

Donald Lee Hall (born March 8, 1969) is an American animation film director, voice actor and screenwriter who is best known for directing the films Winnie the Pooh (2011), Big Hero 6 (2014), Raya and the Last Dragon (2021) and Strange World (2022), and co-directing the film Moana (2016) for Walt Disney Animation Studios. For his work on Big Hero 6, he won an Academy Award for Best Animated Feature, and was again nominated for Raya and the Last Dragon.

In June 2024, Hall was announced to have joined Skydance Animation to develop and produce an original animated film for the studio. However in November 2026, a month after Paramount Skydance acquired Warner Bros. Discovery, Hall quit Skydance and returned to Disney, taking his original film with him.

== Early life ==
Hall was born in 1969 in Glenwood, Iowa. He graduated from Glenwood Community High School.

Hall graduated from the University of Iowa with a Bachelor of Fine Arts and from the California Institute of the Arts with a degree in character animation. He began working for Walt Disney Animation Studios at the age of 25.

== Filmography ==
=== Feature films ===
Year	Film	Credited as						
Year	Film	Director	Writer	Executive Producer	Artistic Supervisor/ Head of Story	Story Artist	Other	Notes
1999	Tarzan	No	No	No	No	Yes	No	
2000	The Emperor's New Groove	No	No	No	No	Yes	Yes	Additional Story Material
2002	Spirit: Stallion of the Cimarron	No	No	No	No	Additional	No	
2003	Brother Bear	No	No	No	No	Additional	No	
2005	Chicken Little	No	No	No	No	Yes	Yes	Character Designer
2007	Meet the Robinsons	No	Yes	No	Yes	No	Yes	Voice of Coach and Gaston Framagucci
2008	Bolt	No	No	No	No	No	Yes	Special Thanks
2009	The Princess and the Frog	No	No	No	Yes	No	Yes	Voice of Darnell
2010	Tangled	No	No	No	No	No	Yes	Disney Story Trust - uncredited
2011	Winnie the Pooh	Yes	Story	No	No	No	Yes	Disney Story Trust - uncredited
2012	Wreck-It Ralph	No	No	No	No	No	Yes	Disney Story Trust - uncredited
2013	Frozen	No	No	No	No	No	Yes	Disney Story Trust - uncredited
2014	Big Hero 6	Yes	No	No	No	No	Yes	Creative Leadership
2016	Zootopia	No	No	No	No	No	Yes	Creative Leadership
2016	Moana	Co-Director	Story	No	No	No	Yes	Creative Leadership
2018	Ralph Breaks the Internet	No	No	No	No	Additional	Yes	Creative Leadership
2019	Frozen 2	No	No	No	No	No	Yes	Creative Leadership
2021	Raya and the Last Dragon	Yes	Story	No	No	No	Yes	Creative Leadership
2021	Encanto	No	No	No	No	No	Yes	Creative Leadership
2022	Strange World	Yes	No	No	No	No	Yes	Creative Leadership
2023	Wish	No	No	Yes	No	No	Yes	Creative Leadership
2024	Moana 2	No	No	No	No	No	Yes	Creative Leadership, Special Thanks - Gratitude (as "Don")
2026	Ray Gunn	No	No	No	No	No	Yes	Creative Leadership
TBA	Untitled Walt Disney Animation Studios project	Yes	TBA	No	No	No	TBA	

==== Short films ====
Year	Title	Director	Executive Producer	Notes
2017	Gone Fishing	Co-Director	No	
2022	Baymax!	No	Yes	Also creator; Disney+ Original Short Films

== Awards and nominations ==
=== Won ===
- (2015) – Academy Award for Best Animated Feature for Big Hero 6
- (2015) – Visual Effects Society Award for Outstanding Visual Effects in an Animated Feature for Big Hero 6

=== Nominations ===
- (2008) – Annie Award for Storyboarding in a Feature Production for Meet the Robinsons
- (2012) – Gold Derby Award for Animated Feature for Winnie the Pooh
- (2012) – Annie Award for Writing in a Feature Production for Winnie the Pooh
- (2012) – Annie Award for Directing in a Feature Production for Winnie the Pooh
- (2015) – Annie Award for Directing in a Feature Production for Big Hero 6
- (2015) – Alliance of Women Film Journalists for Best Animated Film for Big Hero 6
- (2015) – BAFTA Award for Best Animated Film for Big Hero 6
- (2015) – Cinema Bloggers Award, Portugal for Best Animated Film for Big Hero 6
- (2015) – Crítici de Cinema Online Portugueses Award for Best Animated Film for Big Hero 6
- (2015) – Gold Derby Award for Animated Feature for Big Hero 6
- (2017) – Alliance of Women Film Journalists for Best Animated Film for Moana
- (2022) – Academy Award for Best Animated Feature for Raya and the Last Dragon
