= Dan Gerson =

American screenwriter and voice actor (1966–2016)

- Gerson (left) with Robert Baird at Monsters University premiere in June 2013
- Born: Daniel Robert Gerson; August 1, 1966; New York City, U.S.
- Died: February 6, 2016 (aged 49); Los Angeles, California, U.S.
- Occupations: Screenwriter, voice actor
- Years active: 1997–2016
- Notable work: Monsters, Inc. Monsters University; Big Hero 6
- Spouse: Beau Stacom (m. 1995)
- Children: 2

Daniel Robert Gerson (August 1, 1966 – February 6, 2016) was an American screenwriter and voice actor, best known for his work with Pixar Animation Studios and Walt Disney Animation Studios. He co-wrote the screenplays of Monsters, Inc., Monsters University and Big Hero 6, which was reported to be his last film as screenwriter.

Gerson contributed material to Chicken Little, Cars, Meet the Robinsons, Up, Inside Out and Zootopia, as well as television shows including Misguided Angeles, Big Wolf on Campus and Something So Right. Big Hero 6 won the Academy Award for best animated film and was also the highest-grossing animated film of 2014. He also won a BAFTA award.

== Early life ==
Gerson grew up in New York on the Upper West Side and attended the Ethical Culture Fieldston School before studying at Cornell University, where he was a member of the Sigma Pi fraternity, Mu chapter. He then studied for an MFA at NYU and wrote for NBC before joining Pixar in 1999. He married Beau Stacom, with whom he had two children.

== Career in film writing ==
=== Monsters, Inc. ===
Gerson described writing his first film, Monsters, Inc., as a highly collaborative process: "I would sit with Pete Docter and David Silverman and we would talk about a scene and they would tell me what they were looking for. I would make some suggestions and then go off and write the sequence. We'd get together again and review it and then hand it off to a story artist. Here's where the collaborative process really kicked in. The board artist was not beholden to my work and could take liberties here and there. Sometimes, I would suggest an idea about making the joke work better visually. Once the scene moved on to animation, the animators would plus the material even further." Andrew Stanton credited him as having rewritten and improved Monsters, Inc. after he was unable to continue with the project: "I’ve never written anything that I felt was [not improvable], and Dan Gerson was the guy who came in after I left and kept running with it."

=== Monsters University ===
Gerson's collaborator Robert L. Baird noted that development of Monsters University took seven years from the basic idea of a prequel. Gerson described writing Monsters University as a challenge due to the difficulty of writing an engaging prequel when audiences know what the ending will be:

We wanted to try and do a movie in which Mike is our main character and we've had a lot of challenges with this being a prequel. We have never written a prequel, and in fact when we looked at the prequels that are out there, there weren't that many, and the ones that exist aren't great....how do we get people to come along on this journey even though they know where we're ending up? Can we get people to invest in his wants and desires and...almost cause the audience to forget a little bit about where we're ending up … If we’ve done our job, the audience will get so invested it's still going to be something of a surprise.

Gerson also in interview described the format of a college comedy challenging to integrate with an animated film for children: "There's a general sense of the fun of being a college student, without any of the things that might be in a more adult-oriented college film." At an interview with Baird at the premiere, Gerson again stressed the importance of collaboration and development:

We write a version of the script...and then we blow it to bits, we get in there with the Pixar brain trust, and they just smash it apart, and then you rebuild it and you do that like six, seven times. That's why we were on the movie for three and a half years. People can't understand how it could take that long to write. It's just that you're doing different iterations of the movie and it's getting better every time...we both worked on the first one and having those voices in our head, knowing that we want to stay true to those voices even though we're going ten years in the past...so that when you watch Monsters, Inc, there's consistency...The main thing is just to write, and we meet a lot of young writers who say, "I want to get into the business, how do I get into the business?" And a lot of them have trouble completing their first screenplay...you only get better by writing and rewriting and rewriting.

Roy Conli, who produced Big Hero 6, described his and Baird's approach to writing the film as being "to find that line that was emotional and not damaging." Outside scriptwriting, Gerson advised Pixar president Edwin Catmull on structuring his 2014 autobiography.

=== Cameos ===
Gerson also took small voice parts in some of his films, including Monsters, Inc. and Big Hero 6, often as minor characters such as a janitor or desk sergeant. His contribution to Monsters, Inc., the janitors Smitty and Needleman, began as guide vocals which director Pete Docter liked so much he kept in the final mix. His name also made a cameo appearance on a scoreboard in Monsters, Inc. as the most unsuccessful monster on the list and as the Desk Sergeant in Big Hero 6.

=== Filmography ===
- Monsters, Inc. - 2001 - screenplay and voice actor
- Chicken Little - 2005 - additional story material
- Cars - 2006 - additional screenplay material
- Meet the Robinsons - 2007 - additional story material
- Monsters University - 2013 - writer and voice actor
- Big Hero 6 - 2014 - writer and voice actor

== Death ==
Gerson died in Los Angeles on February 6, 2016, at the age of 49, from heart failure and brain cancer-related complications. He was working on Cars 3 at the time of his death. The film was completed by several screenwriters and was dedicated to his memory.
