= List of Mckenna Grace performances =

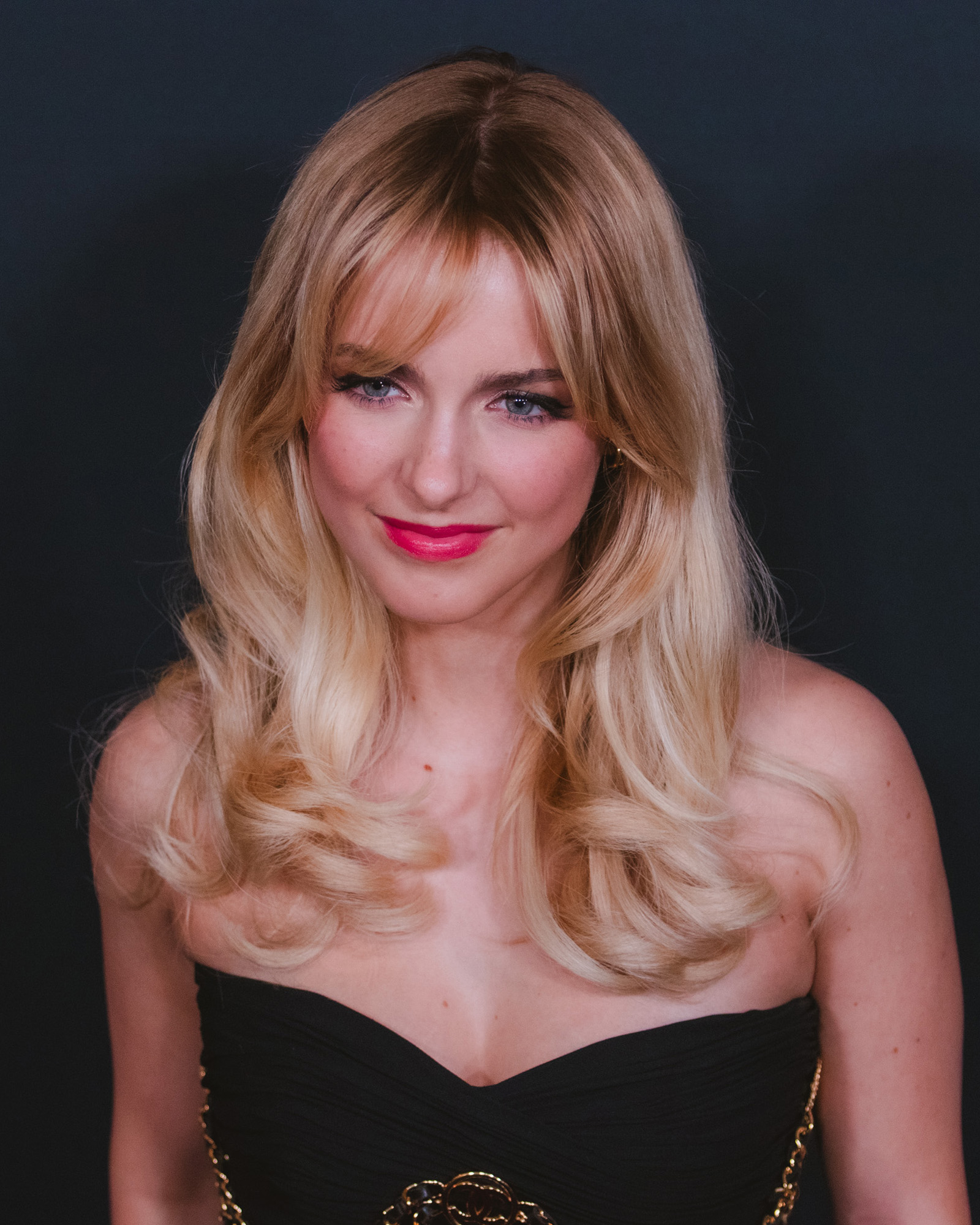
Grace at the 2026 WWD Style Awards

Mckenna Grace is an American actress who has appeared in films, television series, video games, and narrative podcasts. A 2022 Yahoo! Entertainment article referred to her as "one of the most successful and prolific child actors of her generation", with over 70 credits by that point. Having wanted to act since age four, Grace secured her first part in a commercial at five years old. She made her onscreen debut in Disney XD's sitcom Crash & Bernstein (2012–2014), while she had her first film role in Goodbye World (2013). She subsequently appeared in several films and television shows, including The Young and the Restless (2013–2015), The Vampire Diaries (2015), Mr. Church (2016), Independence Day: Resurgence (2016), Designated Survivor (2016–2019), and Fuller House (2016–2020).

In 2017, Grace garnered global recognition for her role as an intellectually gifted seven-year-old in the drama film Gifted, for which she received a nomination for the Critics' Choice Movie Awards for Best Young Performer. She also appeared in the 2017 films How to Be a Latin Lover, Amityville: The Awakening, and I, Tonya. The following year, Grace portrayed a murderous girl in The Bad Seed, a psychic middle child in The Haunting of Hill House, the younger version of the titular character in Chilling Adventures of Sabrina, and a child prodigy in Young Sheldon. She played the lattermost role until 2023. Grace appeared in three films released in 2019. Her first was Captain Marvel, in which she portrayed a 13-year-old version of the titular character. She also led the comedy-drama Troop Zero and the supernatural horror Annabelle Comes Home. Grace subsequently had voice roles in Scoob! (2020) and Spirit Untamed (2021).

Grace portrayed an intelligent teenager who has been abused and raped in the Hulu dystopian show The Handmaid's Tale (2021–2022), and a rebellious first-year student in an episode of the Disney+ horror comedy Just Beyond (2021). For the former, she was nominated for the Primetime Emmy Award for Outstanding Guest Actress in a Drama Series. Grace starred in the Ghostbusters sequels Afterlife (2021). In 2022, she wrote, executive produced, and starred in a sequel to The Bad Seed and portrayed Jan Broberg in Peacock's A Friend of the Family. The following year, she appeared in the science fiction adventure film Crater (2023). She has since starred in the sequels Ghostbusters: Frozen Empire (2024), Five Nights at Freddy's 2 (2025), and Scream 7 (2026), as well as the romantic drama Regretting You (2025). Aside from acting, Grace has written and performed her own music, including two extended plays. She also directs and stars in her music videos.

== Film ==
Key
†	Denotes films that have not yet been released

Mckenna Grace's film appearancss
Year	Title	Role	Notes	Ref(s)
2013	Goodbye World	Hannah Palmer		
2013	Suburban Gothic	Zelda		
2015	Russell Madness	Lena		
2015	Frankenstein	Molly		
2016	Mr. Church	Isabel "Izzy" Brooks		
2016	The Angry Birds Movie	Ella Bird	Voice role	
2016	Independence Day: Resurgence	Daisy Blackwell		
2017	Gifted	Mary Adler		
2017	How to Be a Latin Lover	Arden		
2017	Amityville: The Awakening	Juliet Walker		
2017	I, Tonya	Young Tonya Harding		
2018	Ready Player One	Elementary school kid		
2019	Captain Marvel	Young Carol Danvers		
2019	Troop Zero	Christmas Flint		
2019	Annabelle Comes Home	Judy Warren		
2020	Scoob!	Young Daphne Blake	Voice role	
2021	Spirit Untamed	Abigail Stone	Voice role	
2021	Malignant	Young Madison Lake / Young Emily May		
2021	Ghostbusters: Afterlife	Phoebe Spengler		
2023	Crater	Addison		
2023	Paw Patrol: The Mighty Movie	Skye	Voice role	
2024	Ghostbusters: Frozen Empire	Phoebe Spengler		
2025	What We Hide	Sadie / Spider	Also executive producer	
2025	Slanted	Jo Hunt		
2025	Nimrods	Olivia		
2025	Regretting You	Clara Grant	Also executive producer	
2025	Anniversary	Birdie Taylor		
2025	Five Nights at Freddy's 2	Lisa		
2026	Scream 7	Hannah Thurman		
2026	Paw Patrol: The Dino Movie	Skye	Voice role	
2026	The Last Kiss	Laurel Hansen	Direct-to-video film	
2026	The Hunger Games: Sunrise on the Reaping	Maysilee Donner / Merrilee Donner		

== Television ==
Mckenna Grace's television appearances
Year	Title	Role	Notes	Ref(s)
2012–2014	Crash & Bernstein	Jasmine Bernstein	Recurring role; 15 episodes	
2013	The Goodwin Games	Even Younger Chloe	Episode: "Hamletta"	
2013	Joe, Joe & Jane	Sydney	Unaired television pilot	
2013–2014	Instant Mom	Sam	Episodes: "Forty-Two Inches of Pure Evil" & "True Romance"	
2013–2015	The Young and the Restless	Faith Newman	Recurring role; 50 episodes	
2014	Clarence	Tinia Pearson	Voice role; Episode: "Patients"	
2014	CSI: Crime Scene Investigation	Young Abby Fisher	Episode: "Dead Woods"	
2014	Clementine	Lucy	Unaired television pilot	
2015	K.C. Undercover	Quinn	Episode: "Give Me a 'K'! Give Me a 'C'!"	
2015	The Vampire Diaries	Young Caroline Forbes	Episodes: "Stay" & "Let Her Go"	
2015	Genie in a Bikini	Teresa	Television film	
2015	Dog with a Blog	Jules	Episode: "You're Not My Sister Anymore"	
2015	Babysitter's Black Book	Cindy	Television film	
2015	CSI: Cyber	Michelle Mundo	Recurring role; 3 episodes	
2015–2017	Once Upon a Time	Young Emma Swan	Recurring role; 4 episodes (seasons 5–6)	
2015–2017	Pickle and Peanut	Cindy / Sugarbee	Voice role; 3 episodes	
2016	Teachers	Avery	Episode: "Drunk Kiss"	
2016	Bizaardvark	Didi	Episode: "Pretty-Con"	
2016	Marvel's Most Wanted	Zoe Abel	Unaired television pilot	
2016–2017	The Lion Guard	Kambuni / Young Hippo #2	Voice role; Episodes: "Follow That Hippo" & "Rafiki's New Neighbors"	
2016, 2018	Elena of Avalor	Bella	Voice role; Episodes: "All Heated Up" & "A Lava Story"	
2016–2019	Designated Survivor	Penny Kirkman	Recurring role; 21 episodes	
2016–2020	Fuller House	Rose Harbenberger	Recurring role; 8 episodes (seasons 2–5)	
2017–2021	Mickey and the Roadster Racers	Bitsy Beagleberg	Voice role; 5 episodes	
2018	The Bad Seed	Emma Grossman	Television film	
2018	The Haunting of Hill House	Theodora "Theo" Crain (young)	Miniseries; 7 episodes	
2018	Chilling Adventures of Sabrina	Young Sabrina Spellman	Episode: "A Midwinter's Tale"	
2018–2023	Young Sheldon	Paige Swanson	Recurring role; 9 episodes (seasons 2–6)	
2020	Home Movie: The Princess Bride	The Grandson	Episode: "Chapter Two: The Shrieking Eels"	
2021–2022	The Handmaid's Tale	Esther Keyes	Recurring role; 6 episodes (seasons 4–5)	
2021	Just Beyond	Veronica Vanderhall	Episode: "Leave Them Kids Alone"	
2022	The Bad Seed Returns	Emma Grossman	Television film; also co-writer and executive producer	
2022	A Friend of the Family	Jan Broberg	Miniseries; 5 episodes	
2024	Batman: Caped Crusader	Nocturna / Natalia Night	Voice role; Episode: "Nocturne"	
2025	Krapopolis	Vengeance	Voice role; Episode: "Vengeance Will Be Nine"	
2027	Scooby-Doo: Origins †	Daphne Blake	Post-production; main role	

== Video games ==
Mckenna Grace's video game appearances
Year	Title	Role	Ref(s)
2021	Ghostbusters: Afterlife Scare	Phoebe Spengler	

== Narrative podcasts ==
Mckenna Grace's narrative podcast appearances
Year	Title	Role	Notes	Ref(s)
2023	The Foxes of Hydesville	Katie Fox	Main role	

== Discography ==
=== Extended plays ===
Mckenna Grace's extended plays
Title	Details
Bittersweet 16	Released: March 3, 2023; Label: Photo Finish Records; Format: Digital download, streaming
Autumn Leaves	Released: October 13, 2023; Label: Photo Finish Records; Format: Digital download, streaming

=== Singles ===
==== As lead artist ====
Mckenna Grace's singles as lead artist
Year	Title	Album / EP	Ref(s)
2021	"Haunted House"	Ghostbusters: Afterlife	
2022	"Do All My Friends Hate Me?"	Non-album single	
2022	"You Ruined Nirvana"	Non-album single	
2022	"Post Party Trauma"	Bittersweet 16	
2022	"Self Dysmorphia"	Non-album single	
2023	"Ugly Crier"	Bittersweet 16	
2023	"Checkered Vans"	Bittersweet 16	
2023	"Buzzkill Baby"	Bittersweet 16	
2023	"Casual Kisser"	TBA	
2023	"Bark to the Beat" (with Blackbear)	Paw Patrol: The Mighty Movie	
2023	"Catch Me"	Autumn Leaves	
2024	"Natalie"	TBA	
2024	"Middle Name" (with Carver Jones)	Carv	
2024	"Gentleman"	TBA	
2024	"Loser!!"	TBA	
2024	"Swim Team"	TBA	
2026	"Ugly and Rotten"	TBA	
2026	"It's So Fine"	Nimrods (Original Soundtrack)	
2026	"Bones and All"	TBA	

==== As featured artist ====
Mckenna Grace's singles as featured artist
Year	Title	Peak chart positions				Album	Ref.
Year	Title	US Main.	US Hard Rock Digi.	US Hot Hard Rock	US Rock	Album	Ref.
2026	"Twisting the Knife" (from Scream 7) (Ice Nine Kills featuring Mckenna Grace)	40	1	1	31	Non-album single	

=== Soundtrack appearances ===
Mckenna Grace's soundtrack appearances
Year	Title	Album	Ref(s)
2026	"Half Alive"	The Hunger Games: Sunrise on the Reaping (The Album)	

== Music videos ==
Mckenna Grace's music video appearances
Year	Title	Artist(s)	Ref(s)
2020	"Queen of Broken Hearts"	Blackbear	
2021	"Haunted House"	Mckenna Grace	
2022	"Do All My Friends Hate Me?"	Mckenna Grace	
2022	"You Ruined Nirvana"	Mckenna Grace	
2023	"Ugly Crier"	Mckenna Grace	
2023	"Buzzkill Baby"	Mckenna Grace	
2023	"Casual Kisser"	Mckenna Grace	
2023	"Catch Me"	Mckenna Grace	
2024	"Gentleman"	Mckenna Grace	
2024	"Loser!!"	Mckenna Grace	
2025	"Denim"	Kylie Cantrall	
2026	"Twisting the Knife" (Part 1)	Ice Nine Kills featuring herself	
2026	"Ugly and Rotten"	McKenna Grace	
2026	"Bones and All"	McKenna Grace	
2026	"Half Alive"	McKenna Grace	
