= Mckenna Grace =

American actress and singer (born 2006)

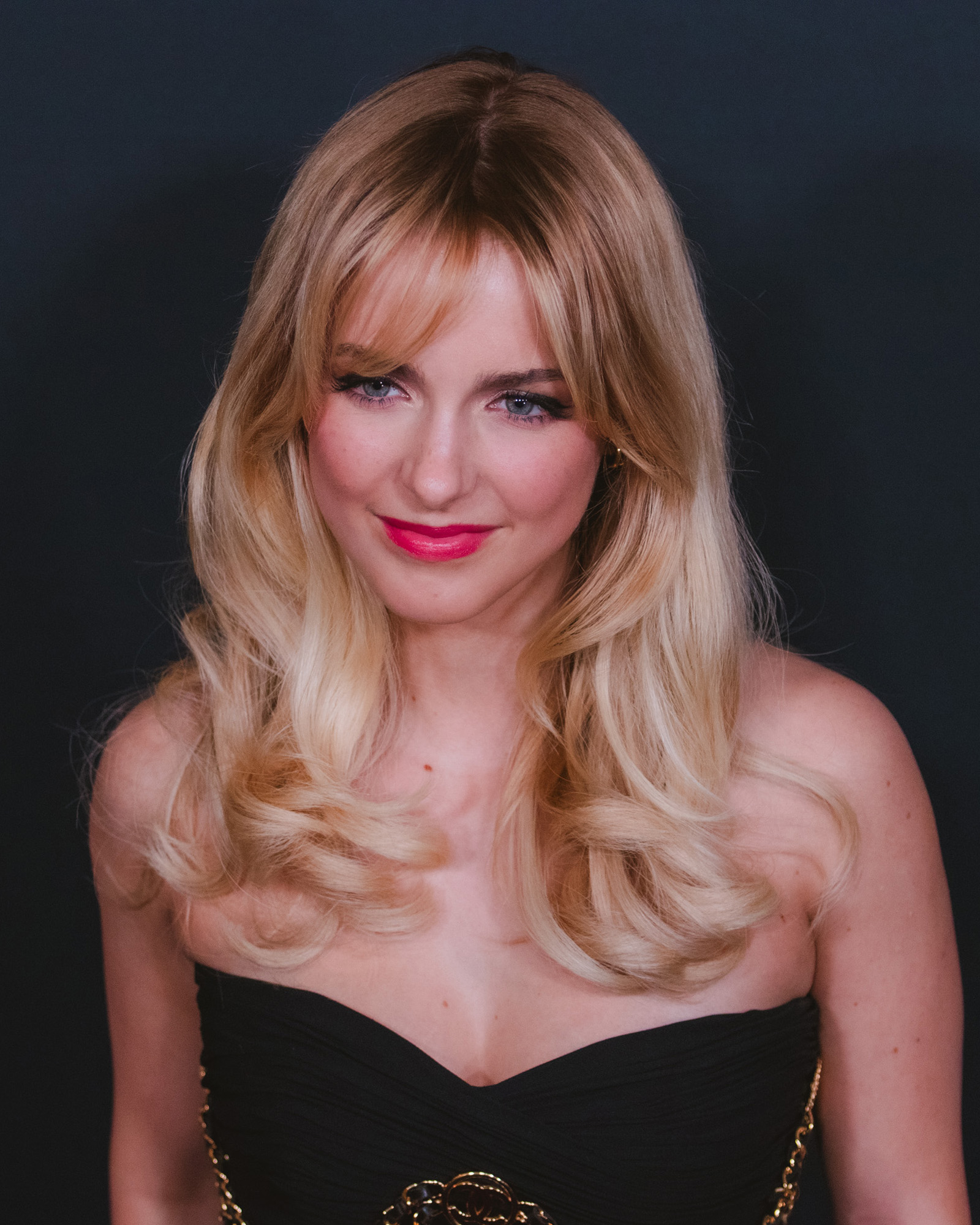
- Grace in 2026
- Born: Mckenna Grace Burge; June 25, 2006 (age 20); Grapevine, Texas, U.S.
- Occupations: Actress; singer
- Years active: 2012–present
- Works: Full list
- Musical career
- Genres: Pop rock; folk
- Years active: 2020–present
- Label: Photo Finish
- Website: mckennagrace.com

Mckenna Grace Burge (born June 25, 2006) is an American actress and singer. Her earliest roles included Jasmine Bernstein in the Disney XD sitcom Crash & Bernstein (2012–2014) and Faith Newman in the soap opera The Young and the Restless (2013–2015). After several small roles, she starred as a child prodigy in Gifted (2017), a breakthrough for which she received a nomination for the Critics' Choice Movie Award for Best Young Performer.

Grace garnered further recognition for playing younger versions of characters in I, Tonya (2017), The Haunting of Hill House (2018) and Captain Marvel (2019), and for her lead roles in The Bad Seed (2018), Troop Zero (2019), and Annabelle Comes Home (2019). For playing the abused teenager Esther Keyes in The Handmaid's Tale (2021–2022), Grace was nominated for the Primetime Emmy Award for Outstanding Guest Actress in a Drama Series, making her the first child recognized for a guest acting Emmy. She portrayed Phoebe Spengler in the supernatural comedy films Ghostbusters: Afterlife (2021) and Ghostbusters: Frozen Empire (2024), receiving critical praise and a Critics' Choice Super Award nomination. In 2022, Grace wrote, executive produced, and starred in The Bad Seed Returns, and portrayed Jan Broberg in A Friend of the Family. She then starred in the romantic drama Regretting You (2025), the supernatural horror Five Nights at Freddy's 2 (2025), the slasher Scream 7 (2026), and the dystopian The Hunger Games: Sunrise on the Reaping (2026).

Outside of her acting career, Grace is also a recording artist. After signing with Photo Finish Records in 2020, she released her debut single, "Haunted House", in 2021, as part of the Ghostbusters: Afterlife soundtrack. She released two extended plays in 2023, Bittersweet 16 and Autumn Leaves, which explored pop rock and folk sounds, respectively. She also co-wrote and performed the song "Half Alive" for the soundtrack to Sunrise on the Reaping.

== Early life ==
Mckenna Grace Burge was born on June 25, 2006, in Grapevine, Texas. She is the only child of Ross Burge, an orthopedic surgeon, and Crystal Grace, a medical sales representative. She lived in Dallas-Fort Worth as a young child. Grace trained in cheerleading, gymnastics, tap, and ballet. She participated in beauty pageants, where she was crowned "Tiny Miss Texas".

Grace first expressed interest in acting at the age of four, after she received a collection of DVD films starring Shirley Temple from her great-grandmother. Her acting teacher, who was Morgan Fairchild's sister, advised that she should sign with an agent. Grace secured her first part in a commercial at the age of five. Her agent later recommended traveling to Los Angeles, California, to see if she might land roles in films and television shows. After Grace secured parts in Crash & Bernstein (2012–2014) and Goodbye World (2013), her family moved to the city, with her father having a residency in Ventura.

Grace has never attended a public school; she has been homeschooled and had on-set tutors. In 2017, Grace stated that she was attending a creative writing workshop with other homeschooled students once a week. In 2021, Grace took a college course on media aesthetics, in which she had to repeatedly write about The Handmaid's Tale without mentioning her own work on the show.

== Acting career ==
=== 2012–2017: Early roles and breakthrough ===
Grace made her acting debut in Disney XD's Crash & Bernstein, recurring as Jasmine Bernstein. She reprised her role in the show's second season, playing the role until 2014. During this time, she made a guest appearance on the Fox sitcom The Goodwin Games. In 2013, she made her film debut in Goodbye World, a comedy-drama that disappointed critics. Between 2013 and 2015, she had a recurring role as Faith Newman on the soap opera The Young and the Restless. In 2015, Grace portrayed young Caroline Forbes in The Vampire Diaries. TVLine included her appearance in a list of the best flashback castings on television: "It's one thing to look like the younger version of a character, but Grace even cried like Caroline". Grace appeared in three films released in 2016—Mr. Church, The Angry Birds Movie, and Independence Day: Resurgence—all of which received negative reviews.

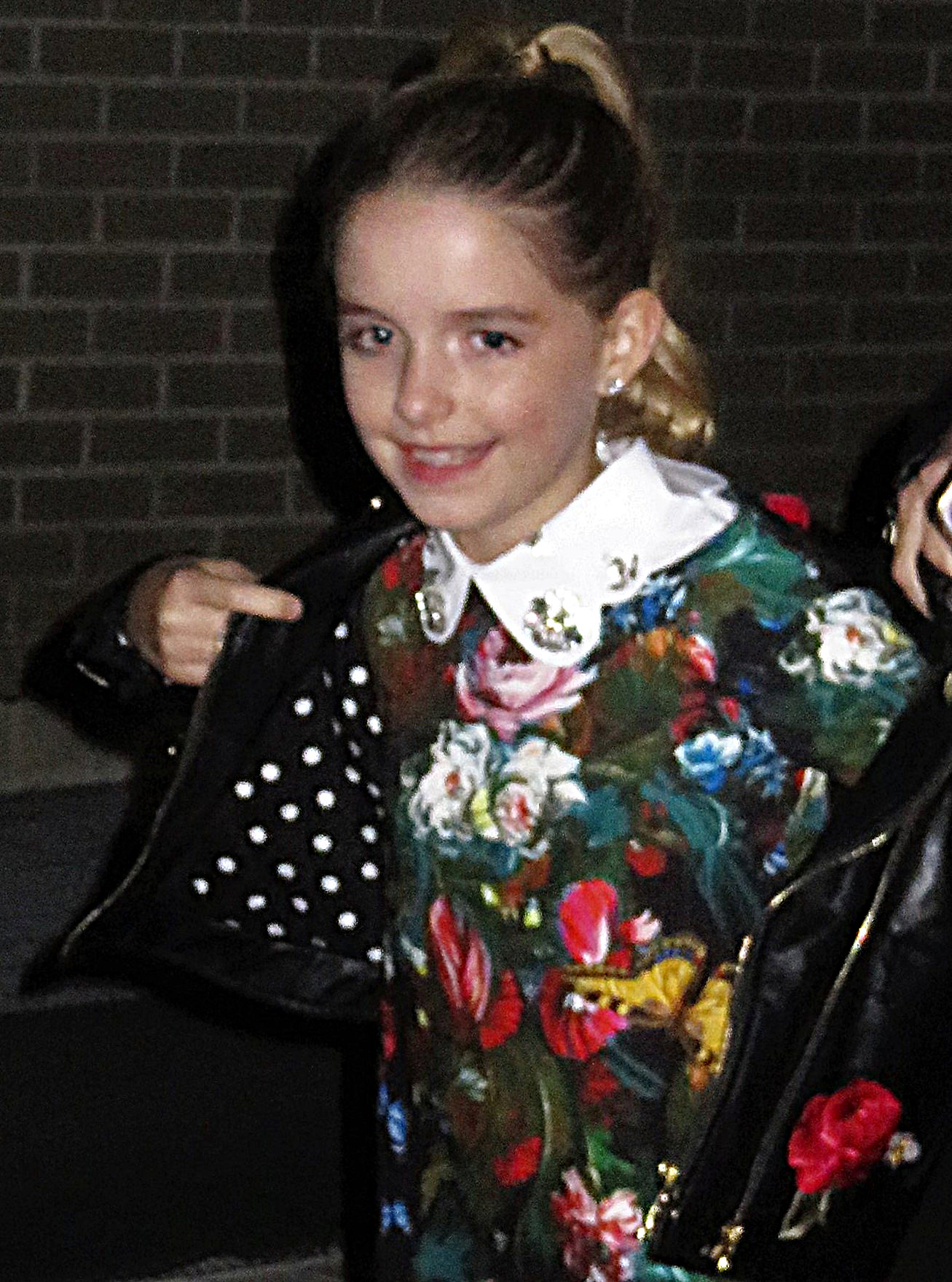
Grace at the premiere of I, Tonya in 2017

In September 2015, Grace joined the cast of the drama film Gifted (2017), which tells the story of Mary Adler (Grace), an intellectually gifted seven-year-old. She was selected for her "childlike charm yet old-soul maturity" and chemistry with co-star Chris Evans. She prepared for her role by watching several films about child prodigies, including I Am Sam (2001) and In America (2002). Grace used songwriting to help remember the complex mathematical problems that Mary solves in the film. It became her breakthrough role. Richard Roeper of the Chicago Sun-Times found her to be "an irresistible force", praising her scenes with Evans as "sensational". For her performance, Grace received a nomination for the Critics' Choice Movie Award for Best Young Performer.

Grace portrayed the younger version of Tonya Harding in the biopic I, Tonya (2017). She said it was the most difficult role she had ever undertaken physically due to having to learn to ice skate. As Harding was a skilled jumper from a young age, Grace had a double who performed the spins, jump combinations, and double lutz in the film. I, Tonya was well received by reviewers, with particular praise for its cast's performances. Writing for RogerEbert.com, the film critic Christy Lemire complimented Grace's portrayal of Harding's angst and heartache.

=== 2018–2020: Horror roles and further recognition ===
Grace appeared in the 2018 horror drama The Bad Seed, a remake of the 1956 film of the same name, itself an adaptation of William March's 1954 novel. She portrays Emma Grossman, a girl who murders anyone who crosses her. Grace, who had longed to play a horror villain, was excited by the opportunity. In preparation for the role, she watched the 1956 film and focused on emulating the mannerisms of Rhoda Penmark (that film's version of Emma), including her gait and facials; Grace also consulted Patty McCormack, who played Rhoda in the 1956 film. Upon The Bad Seed's September 2018 premiere on Lifetime, critics commended her performance. According to The Hollywood Reporter, Grace's ability to be "unnerving, sweet and occasionally funny" is key to the success or failure of The Bad Seed, and "she nails every beat"; similarly, The A.V. Club lauded her portrayal of "the calculatedness of Emma's demeanor while giving a giggly edge to lines".

In 2018, Grace starred in Netflix's horror series The Haunting of Hill House. To prepare for the role of young Theodora "Theo" Crain, she dyed her hair dark brown. The Haunting of Hill House, and its performances, received praise from critics. Now opined that she played the role with "wisdom way beyond her years". In the same year, she made a guest appearance on the supernatural horror show Chilling Adventures of Sabrina's holiday special entitled "A Midwinter's Tale". Grace played a younger version of the titular character, who is portrayed by Kiernan Shipka as a teenager. According to the series creator, Roberto Aguirre-Sacasa, Shipka immediately suggested Grace for the role after hearing a pre-teen Sabrina would appear on the show. During this time, she began recurring on the CBS sitcom Young Sheldon as Paige Swanson, a child prodigy and rival to the titular character.

Grace appeared in three films released in 2019. The first of these was a comedy-drama titled Troop Zero, which features Grace as a misfit girl who wants to send messages to space and enters a nationwide competition alongside a group of Birdie Scouts. For Troop Zero, she cut her hair asymmetrically, with one side near her shoulder and the other by her chin. Grace also tried not to wash her hair or maintain herself too well since she wanted to appear crazy like her character. Critics were generally favorable in their reviews of the film and lauded the cast. Variety described her as a "magnetic young performer", while The A.V. Club found her approach to her character "refreshingly non-intuitive", noting her portrayal of the feelings of loss through excitement rather than misery. Grace next portrayed a 13-year-old version of the eponymous character in the superhero film Captain Marvel. The film was a critical and commercial success, grossing over $1.1 billion and ranking among the highest-grossing films of all time.

Grace's final release of 2019 was the supernatural horror film Annabelle Comes Home, which became the seventh installment in The Conjuring Universe. She starred as Judy Warren, daughter of the paranormal investigators Ed and Lorraine Warren. The director Gary Dauberman stated he was "very, very fortunate and very, very happy" to cast Grace, citing her professionalism and talent. Upon release, Annabelle Comes Home grossed over $231 million and received mixed reviews; Grace's performance was praised, however. According to The New York Observer, the "terrific" Grace had her own unique interpretation of the "horror movie kid" cliché that suits the "twisted age in which we find ourselves". She also voiced the younger Daphne Blake in 2020's Scoob!. She was set to reprise the role in the follow-up Scoob! Holiday Haunt, which was canceled in August 2022.

=== 2021–2022: The Handmaid's Tale, Ghostbusters: Afterlife, and other roles ===
In 2021, Grace began recurring on the Hulu dystopian series The Handmaid's Tale, an adaptation of the 1985 novel of the same name, as Esther Keyes, an intelligent and rebellious 14-year-old who has been abused, raped, and married off to an older Commander. She was selected for her ability to portray scariness and awfulness. Grace said that it was vital for someone the same age as the character play the part since all the abuse Esther endured was experienced by many 14-year-olds on a daily basis: "If it makes people upset or uncomfortable that an actual 14-year-old is having to talk about how she was raped and it's acting, then maybe that will make you want to do something for actual girls who are going through this." The show's fourth season premiered on April 27, 2021, to positive reviews. Entertainment Weekly commented that Grace had "a memorable turn as a tyrannical child bride", and Den of Geek commended her "remarkable self-possession". At the 73rd Primetime Creative Arts Emmy Awards, Grace received a nomination for Outstanding Guest Actress in a Drama Series, making her the tenth youngest actor nominated at the Emmys and the first child recognized for a guest acting award.

In 2021, Grace voiced a silly and energetic horserider in the DreamWorks animated film Spirit Untamed and played the young version of Annabelle Wallis's character in the horror film Malignant. Grace had a leading role as Phoebe Spengler in the supernatural comedy Ghostbusters: Afterlife (2021), the sequel to Ghostbusters (1984) and Ghostbusters II (1989). For the role, she cut and dyed her hair. The film was released theatrically on November 19, 2021, and became a moderate commercial success, grossing over $204 million on a budget of $75 million. Critics were generally ambivalent towards the film, though they commended Grace's performance. Mark Feeney of The Boston Globe asserted that "[Ghostbusters: Afterlife] has its moments, most of them owing to a quite-phenomenal Mckenna Grace", and Gizmodo considered her performance "instantly unforgettable[,] ... truly revelatory, [and] star-making". Grace was nominated for the Critics' Choice Super Award for Best Actress in a Science Fiction/Fantasy Movie.

At the start of the COVID-19 pandemic in 2020, filming for The Handmaid's Tale halted. Grace and her father decided to write a follow-up to The Bad Seed, knowing that Lifetime wanted to air a sequel. He wrote the general structure of the film while she gave feedback, primarily on the dialogue. According to Lifetime's executive vice president Tanya Lopez, the network was "blown away" by Grace's concept for the sequel. Grace, who reprised her role as Emma, found acting her own script to be a unique experience: "It wasn't my interpretation of someone else's writing or character ... It was me being able to act out the scenes as I had envisioned them." The film, titled The Bad Seed Returns, premiered on Lifetime on September 5, 2022. It was the first project produced by Grace's company, Beautiful Ghosts Productions, with her also serving as executive producer. In the same month, Grace reprised her role as Esther in the fifth season of The Handmaid's Tale. Den of Geek favorably compared her screams in the season's sixth episode to those of Linda Blair in The Exorcist (1973), stating they "distilled seasons of The Handmaid’s Tale's protest [against misogyny] into one primal outburst".

In March 2022, Grace joined the cast of Peacock's true crime miniseries A Friend of the Family as Jan Broberg—who was kidnapped twice and sexually abused by a family friend as a child—sharing the role with Hendrix Yancey. While filming, Grace tried to spend as much time with Yancey as she could and copied her mannerisms and smile. Grace also worked alongside Broberg, who produced the show; the two discussed subtle gestures to show stress, such as nail biting. Grace described the role as "really emotionally and sometimes physically exhausting"; she had to push herself to new limits, and blend three versions of Broberg (her own, Yancey's, and the real-life Broberg). A Friend of the Family premiered on October 6, 2022, to positive critical reviews; Common Sense Media argued that "Grace does a terrific job conveying the mixture of vulnerability and growing dread her character is experiencing".

=== 2023–present: Mainstream success ===
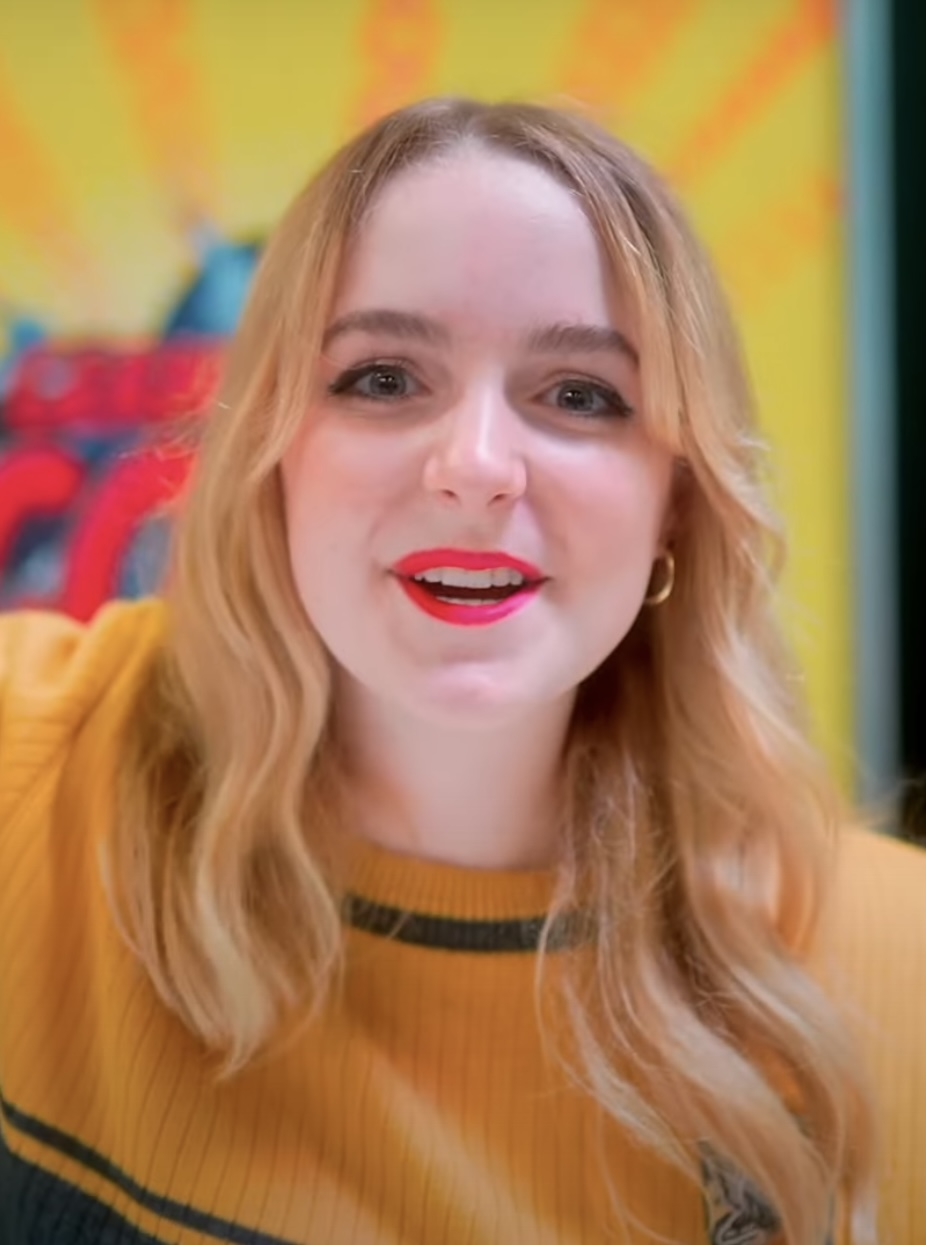
Grace at the 2023 German Comic Con

The following year, Grace starred in the science fiction adventure film Crater, playing Addison, the daughter of a respected scientist from Earth. Grace decided to sign onto the film after the screenplay made her cry. She described it as "really special", admiring its ending, heart, dialogue, and the relationships between the characters. Crater was released on Disney+ on May 12, 2023, to generally positive reviews. Articles in Entertainment.ie and Variety considered Grace to be the film's finest performer. Later that year, she led PAW Patrol: The Mighty Movie, which is based on the titular television series, as the voice of Skye.

Grace reprised her role as Phoebe in Ghostbusters: Frozen Empire, which was released in March 2024. In preparation, Grace analyzed Harold Ramis's performance as Egon Spengler, which she described as her "biggest inspiration". The New York Observer critic Emily Zemler wrote that she "is very compelling and should have been allowed to properly lead the film". Frank Scheck of The Hollywood Reporter said Frozen Empire indicates that she could become "the [Ghostbusters] franchise's MVP". In 2025, Grace starred in the drama film What We Hide, Amy Wang's satirical drama Slanted, and the thriller film Anniversary. Her most commercially successful releases were the romantic drama Regretting You, based on Colleen Hoover's novel, and the supernatural horror Five Nights at Freddy's 2; both were panned by critics, though they praised the performances of Grace and co-star Mason Thames in the former. A review in Slant Magazine identified her as the "lone bright spot" of the film and commended her "recognizably real" portrayal of her character's vulnerability and naivety. Her first film of 2026 was the slasher Scream 7, in which she played a supporting role. It received negative reviews and /Film believed she was "tragically wasted", but yielded commercial success. She originally auditioned for the role of Sidney Prescott's daughter, Tatum.

Grace portrays Maysilee and Merrilee Donner in The Hunger Games: Sunrise on the Reaping (2026), based on the book of the same name. A longtime fan of the franchise, Grace wore several outfits inspired by previous Hunger Games films at several premieres and promotional films. The Los Angeles Times's Amy Nicholson, who disliked the perceived monotony and unoriginality, wrote that Grace's portrayal of Maysilee's pride was "a welcome treat" that significantly elevated the film.

==== Upcoming projects ====
Grace is set to reprise her role as Daphne Blake in Netflix's upcoming live-action Scooby-Doo: Origins series, as well as starring in the film The Official Mistress.

== Music career ==
Grace signed with Photo Finish Records in 2020 and released her debut single, "Haunted House", alongside a music video in November 2021. She co-wrote the song alongside Lily Kincade, with Nathaniel Motte as producer. Grace explained that the song was written during a rough period of her life in the midst of the COVID-19 pandemic, and that one "could take it as a breakup song, but it could also be about a friend or a family member or any kind of relationship that's ended". NPR wrote that the song "has some surprising twists and turns and spells out the beginnings of an exciting new career for Mckenna Grace". While not originally written for Ghostbusters: Afterlife, the song was eventually added to the film's soundtrack and used for the closing credits after director Jason Reitman had heard the song.

Grace released her second and third singles, "Do All My Friends Hate Me?" and "You Ruined Nirvana", in 2022. On November 18, 2022, she released "Self Dysmorphia", which was inspired by her struggles with scoliosis. On putting out the single, Grace said, "it's a little bit weird to put these deeply personal thoughts and struggles out into the world. But, hopefully, ... people who are going through the same thing will feel less alone." She also performed the song on The Today Show in December 2022. Preceded by the songs "Post Party Trauma", "Ugly Crier", and "Checkered Vans", Grace's debut extended play (EP), titled Bittersweet 16, was released on March 3, 2023. She wanted to write a full-length album, but Photo Finish suggested she begin with an EP. Later that year, she recorded the single "Bark to the Beat" for the PAW Patrol: The Mighty Movie soundtrack. Grace's second EP, Autumn Leaves, was released on October 13, 2023. According to Billboard, its single "Catch Me" showcases her skills in storytelling and "woozy, richly textured pop" music. Grace has since released the songs "Natalie", "Gentleman", "Swim Team", and "Ugly and Rotten", and performed at the music festival Lollapalooza. In 2026, she was featured on the heavy metal band Ice Nine Kills's song "Twisting the Knife" as part of the soundtrack of Scream 7; it topped Billboard's Hot Hard Rock Songs chart, marking her first chart entry.

== Artistry and reception ==
Grace is known for portraying younger versions of lead characters. In 2018, IndieWire cited Grace as one of the best child television actors at the time. The Hollywood Reporter named her one of the top 30 stars under age 18 in 2018 and 2019. The following year, the Hollywood Critics Association included Grace in a list of the "Next Generation of Hollywood". In 2022, Yahoo! Entertainment called her "one of the most successful and prolific child actors of her generation", and a 2025 V story dubbed her "one of the most versatile and accomplished young actors today", highlighting her roles in both blockbusters and drama films. Following several roles in horror projects, including The Bad Seed and Annabelle Comes Home, TheWrap dubbed her a scream queen. According to The Independent, Grace has "become a staple of the modern horror genre".

Commenting on Grace's performance in Gifted, Bill Goodykoontz of USA Today described her as "the rare child actor who doesn't seem like she's trying to hit emotional marks". Marc Webb, who directed Grace in Gifted, praised her comedic timing, which he described as "a different kind of sophistication that is very deep and very pure and really sincere". Grace stated that when acting in more dramatic and intense scenes, she "tricks" herself into feeling emotions, and "then you have to figure out how to disassociate it from your real emotions". Of her role choices, Grace commented that she aims to act in projects in which she can tell "important stories" that have genuine meaning to her.

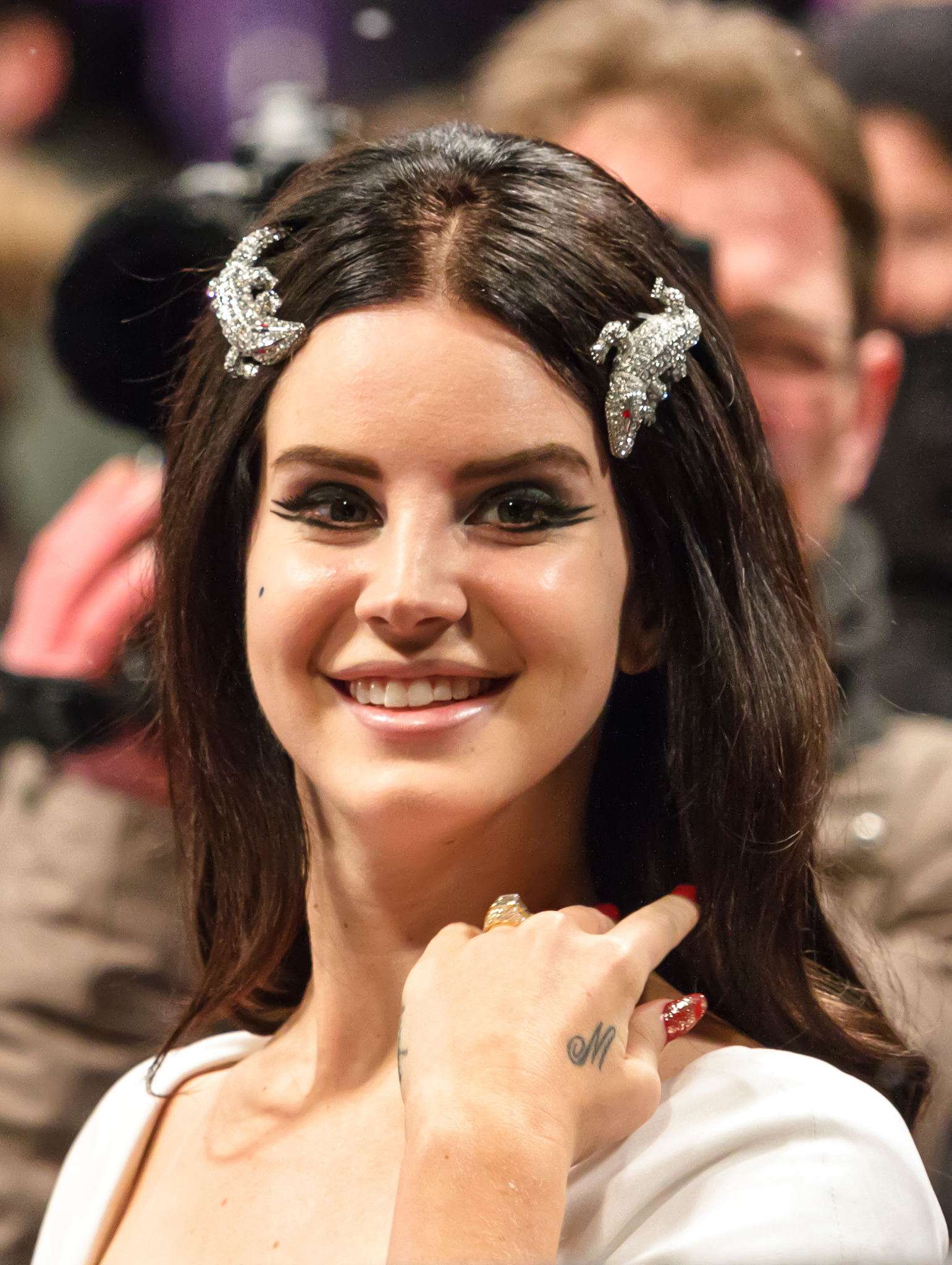
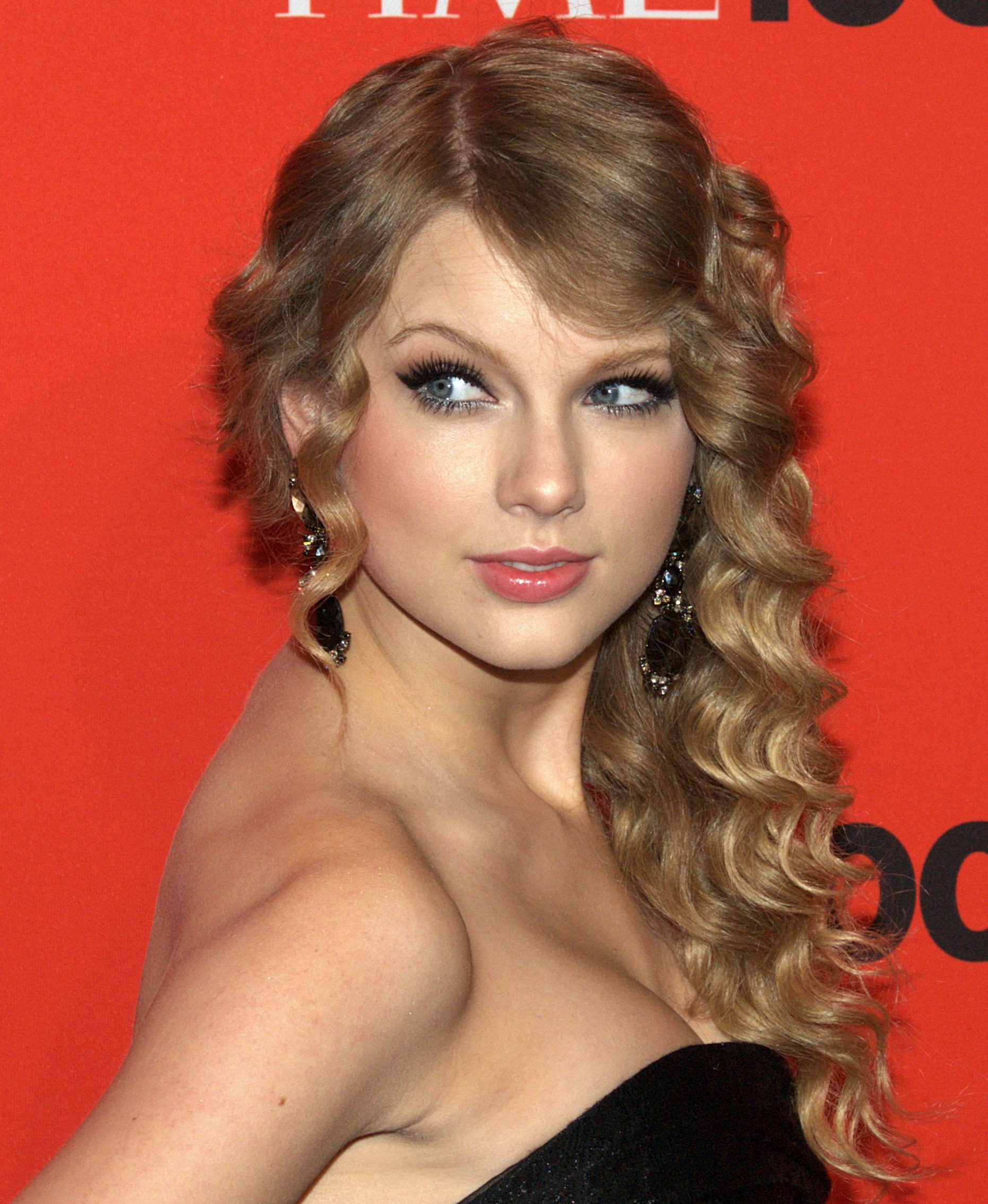
Grace cites American singers Lana Del Rey (left) and Taylor Swift (right) as her main musical influences.

Growing up, Grace listened to a variety of genres, including heavy metal and rap, and artists, including Taylor Swift and Korn. She identified Swift and Lana Del Rey as her key music influences because of their storytelling and the relatable, vivid imagery in their lyrics. She was inspired to begin playing the ukulele after watching the singer and ukulele player Grace Vanderwaal win America's Got Talent in 2016. Grace decided to start writing her own music after listening and emotionally connecting to Conan Gray's album Kid Krow (2020) during the COVID-19 pandemic. Bittersweet 16's sound was primarily influenced by Radiohead, Hole, and Roar; its emotional rawness took inspiration from Mitski.

Bittersweet 16 has a pop rock and pop-punk sound, with its songs discussing themes of heartache, body image, and social anxiety. Autumn Leaves, on the other hand, explores the folk genre and focuses on the subject of young heartbreak. Grace has called her own sound "kind of pop-ish" but does not want to "say [she is] a certain music genre and sound cringy". According to MTV News, her songs prefer "theatricality without bombast to tell her story". She considers songwriting her "therapy" and uses it as a way to express all of her emotions, both positive and negative.

== Personal life ==
Grace stated in 2022 that she prefers to maintain a more private personal life to ensure she "can have a childhood and figure [herself] out as a teenager"; her mother described their home life as "extremely normal". Grace said she separates herself from her characters by spending time with her family and dog and that she recovers from the tiring parts of her career by "gaslight[ing] [her]self into being happy or energetic". She is active on the social networking services Instagram, Twitter, and TikTok. As of 2021, Grace's mother managed accounts on the former two and approved Grace's posts on TikTok. In 2025, when describing her approach to social media, Grace said she aims to show her personality. She has stated that, as a young female in the film industry, there will inevitably be "very disturbing and gross" remarks directed towards her and that it is impossible to control media perception of her. She was a vegetarian.

In 2018, aged 12, Grace was diagnosed with scoliosis. While filming Ghostbusters: Afterlife, she wore a back brace to correct her spine, but found it uncomfortable and "ended up not wearing it as much as [she] should have." Due to her shooting schedule, she was only able to wear it for the night instead of the intended 22 hours a day. After her spinal curvature surpassed 45 degrees, she was required to have surgery to prevent it from impacting her lungs. In October 2022, she underwent spinal surgery, which reduced the curvature to six degrees.

As of February 2026, Grace is in a relationship with Mason Thames, her Nimrods and Regretting You co-star. Grace and Thames attended the 98th Academy Awards together.

== Filmography ==
According to the review aggregator site Rotten Tomatoes, Grace's most critically acclaimed films include Frankenstein (2015), Gifted (2017), I, Tonya (2017), Captain Marvel (2019), Troop Zero (2019), Paw Patrol: The Mighty Movie (2023), What We Hide (2025), Slanted (2025), Nimrods (2025), and Paw Patrol: The Dino Movie (2026).

== Awards and nominations ==
Awards and nominations received by Mckenna Grace
Year	Award	Category	Work	Result	Ref.
2017	Phoenix Film Critics Society	Breakthrough Performance	Gifted	Won	
2017	Phoenix Film Critics Society	Best Performance by a Youth	Gifted	Won	
2017	Women Film Critics Circle	Best Young Actress	Gifted	Nominated	
2018	Critics' Choice Movie Awards	Best Young Actor/Actress	Gifted	Nominated	
2020	Hollywood Critics Association Film Awards	Next Generation of Hollywood	—N/a	Won (Note: Shared with Brooklynn Prince, Geraldine Viswanathan, Jack Dylan Grazer, Kaitlyn Dever, Kelvin Harrison Jr., Lana Condor, Millicent Simmonds, Noah Jupe, Shahadi Wright Joseph, Thomasin McKenzie, and Zoey Deutch)	
2021	Primetime Emmy Awards	Outstanding Guest Actress in a Drama Series	The Handmaid's Tale	Nominated	
2022	San Diego Film Critics Society	Best Youth Performance	Ghostbusters: Afterlife	Runner-up	
2022	Critics' Choice Super Awards	Best Actress in a Science Fiction/Fantasy Movie	Ghostbusters: Afterlife	Nominated	
2023	Astra Creative Arts TV Awards	Best Guest Actress in a Drama Series	The Handmaid's Tale	Nominated	
2024	Kids' Choice Awards	Favourite Female Voice from an Animated Movie	PAW Patrol: The Mighty Movie	Nominated	
2025	Saturn Awards	Best Younger Performer in a Film	Ghostbusters: Frozen Empire	Nominated	
2026	Atlanta Film Festival	Phoenix Award	—N/a	Won	
2026	Kids' Choice Awards	Favourite Female Voice from an Animated Movie	PAW Patrol: The Dino Movie	Nominated	
