= Hendrix Yancey =

American actress (born 2011)

- Born: August 25, 2011 (age 15); Benton, Arkansas, U.S.
- Occupation: Actress
- Years active: 2017–present

Hendrix Yancey is an American actress. She is known for her starring role as Jan Broberg in A Friend Of The Family and her earlier roles in Netflix's series Stranger Things and Unbelievable, and Amazon Prime's feature film Charming the Hearts of Men.

== Early life ==
Yancey was born in Benton, Arkansas, on August 25, 2011, the daughter of Timie and Jake Yancey. She has an elder brother.

== Career ==
In 2017, at the age of 5, after a workshop at Gray Studios, Yancey acquired Susie Mains of Trilogy Talent as a manager. She was then represented by The Osbrink Agency. Within a month, Yancey secured her first series regular role in the American TV series Versus, produced by AwesomenessTV Production.

She was cast in Netflix’s series Unbelievable in 2018 as Daisy, Merritt Wever’s daughter at the age of 9. Unbelievable was nominated for four Golden Globes and four Emmy Awards among several other international nominations.

Shortly after Unbelievable, Yancey appeared in Amazon’s feature film, Charming the Hearts of Men, alongside Anna Friel, Kelsey Grammer, and Sean Astin.

As of 2022, she appeared as Young Elizabeth in Middle Goblin’s film, Dweller and portrayed Gwen in George & Tammy, which stars Michael Shannon and Jessica Chastain. She appeared as number 013 in season 4 of Netflix’s original series, Stranger Things. Yancey portrays a new test subject in the Hawkins Lab who participates in the Nina Project with Dr. Brenner.

Yancey starred in Peacock’s limited true crime series, A Friend of the Family. She plays Jan Broberg, a young girl from Pocatello, Idaho, who was kidnapped multiple times over the years by a charismatic, obsessed family friend. Yancey starred alongside Mckenna Grace, Anna Paquin, Jake Lacy, Colin Hanks, and Lio Tipton. The series was released on October 6, 2022, on Peacock.

== Personal life ==
As of 2022, Yancey splits her time between Hot Springs, Arkansas, and Los Angeles.

== Filmography ==
=== Film ===
Year	Title	Role	Notes
2021	Charming the Hearts of Men	Angelina	

=== Television ===
Year	Title	Role	Notes
2019	Unbelievable	Daisy	
2022	Stranger Things	013	
2022	A Friend of the Family	Jan Broberg	
2022	George & Tammy	Gwen	
