= Prey (2019 American film) =

American horror film

- Theatrical release poster
- Directed by: Franck Khalfoun
- Written by: David Coggeshall; Franck Khalfoun
- Produced by: Jason Blum; Ashok Amritraj; Chris Lofing; Travis Cluff
- Starring: Logan Miller; Kristine Froseth
- Cinematography: Eric Robbins
- Edited by: Josiah Thiesen
- Music by: Richard Breakspear
- Production companies: Blumhouse Productions; Tremendum Pictures; Image Nation; Hyde Park Entertainment
- Distributed by: Cinedigm
- Release date: September 27, 2019 (United States)
- Running time: 85 minutes
- Country: United States
- Language: English
- Box office: $82,258

Prey is a 2019 American horror film directed by Franck Khalfoun and written by David Coggeshall and Khalfoun. It stars Logan Miller and Kristine Froseth. Jason Blum is serving as a producer through his Blumhouse Productions banner and Ashok Amritraj is producing through his Hyde Park Entertainment banner.

The film was released via direct to video and selected theaters on September 27, 2019, by Cinedigm.

== Plot ==
The opening credits begin with a montage of Polaroid photos showing the progress of a Christian couple, working as missionaries on a remote tropical island. Under their supervision the natives help build a church, but still continue with their Pagan like rituals. This becomes a problem for the couple as their young daughter starts participating with the locals, leading to tensions and eventually the church burning down.

The film then opens several years later with high-school senior Toby Burns undergoing therapy sessions. Following the recent murder of his father at the hands of a pair of car-jackers, his therapist recommends he participate in a behavioral rehabilitation activity program. Along with other participants, Toby and his group are transported by boat to the same island, where each are dropped off on separate locations. His supervisor Kay states she will return in three days to retrieve everyone. Setting up camp near the beach, Toby is immediately off to a bad start as monkeys steal his food, and he is unable to get a camp fire going; he also cuts his foot on a discarded tribal mask in the sea water. Toby eventually gets a fire going, but suffers from vomiting and dehydration; he soon becomes aware that he is not alone before collapsing.

The next morning, Toby awakes to find water left for him, and his foot treated. His savior is a sixteen-year-old girl named Madeline, who is adept at survival on the island. She teaches Toby basic survival skills, while Toby tells her about the outside world and all that she has missed out on. On the night before the day Toby is to be picked up, Madeline becomes annoyed that he is leaving and takes her leave. She warns him however, not to follow her in to the jungle; otherwise her mother will kill him. Kay, who has already arrived and is standing by to collect Toby, goes ashore when she hears him calling out to Madeline. She is attacked by something in the jungle. The next morning, Toby is on the beach when he spots Kay's boat capsized by the shore. He sees a woman: one of the missionaries looting the boat for supplies. After going aboard and finding Kay's dead body, Toby then pursues the woman into the jungle and learns she is Madeline's mother.

He finds what remains of the missionaries settlement, just as Madeline and her mother return. Spotting him, Madeline tells him to head to the east coast for a future meet-up. Once there, Toby makes use of what Madeline taught him and sets up camp. Madeline then joins him and tells him what little she remembers of her life on the island, before her mother, or whatever monster she feels is stalking her, killed everyone, including her father. After Madeline leaves, Toby finds a lighthouse with a gas powered motor still intact. Returning to his camp, he encounters Cameron, one of the other group participants. Toby explains his plan to use the lighthouse as a distress signal and alert any nearby ships; but first, he has to retrieve a canister of gasoline he saw back at the settlement, as well as Madeline. Upon returning there, Toby is chased by Madeline's mother, who is then fatally wounded by a trap Toby had set earlier. However, she reveals that Madeline is actually the monster who killed everyone on the island, including her own father and Kay.

Years ago, when Madeline was young, her parents entered the church to find the locals had performed animal sacrifices to appease a dark malevolent spirit. While they clashed with the locals over what they deemed a desecration of a holy place, an unattended Madeline approached one of the sacrifices and was possessed by the spirit. Transformed into some feral-like demon, she then slaughtered everyone, but spared her mother. Since then, her mother has kept her confined to the island to protect the outside world. She then gives Toby some berry juice that will put Madeline to sleep, before succumbing to her wounds.

Toby returns to camp to find Madeline in her feral form dragging a now dead Cameron through the forest. He watches her transform back to herself, but she is completely oblivious to what she has done. She is overjoyed when she learns her mother is now dead, hoping to finally leave the island. As she attempts to seduce Toby, he sucker punches her and forces the berry juice down her throat before binding her. Toby then gets the lighthouse working that soon draws the attention of a coastal patrol boat, but he is confronted in the lighthouse by the feral Madeline. He manages to lock her inside while using the remaining gasoline to set it on fire. Toby then makes it to the beach and swims out to the boat, but is attacked by Madeline.

The next morning, the captain asks what appears to be Toby with a blanket draped over him if there is anyone else still on the island; it turns out to be Madeline.

== Cast ==
- Logan Miller as Toby Burns
  - Joey Adanalian Young Toby
- Kristine Froseth as Madeleine
  - Vela Cluff as Young Madeleine
- Jolene Anderson as Madeleine's mother
- Anthony Jensen as David Burns, Toby's father
- Phodiso Dintwe as Cameron
- Jerrica Lai as Kay

== Production ==
On June 9, 2016, Blumhouse Productions and Hyde Park Entertainment announced Franck Khalfoun would be directing the film with Logan Miller and Kristine Froseth set to star.

=== Filming ===
Principal photography on the film began in June 2016 in Malaysia, on the island of Langkawi, with the underwater scenes being shot on a soundstage. Three weeks of extensive reshoots were done in 2017 in California. According to Miller, different endings were considered, but were dropped during re-edits.

== Release ==
Prey was released direct to video on demand and select theaters on September 27, 2019. The film was released on DVD on November 5, 2019.

== Reception ==
Prey has a 13% on Rotten Tomatoes based on eight reviews, with an average rating of 4/10.

Frank Scheck of The Hollywood Reporter gave the film a negative review and he said: "Blumhouse has certainly proved very successful with its inventive, low-budget approach to horror, but now that the company is spewing out movies like an assembly line, more and more duds are starting to appear. Everything about this effort, including its hackneyed, overfamiliar title, smacks of laziness and a cynical indifference to its lack of originality." However, Jake Dee of JoBlo.com gave the film a mixed reaction. He said: "The strong central performance by Logan Miller, and the gallant willingness by Khalfoun to scrap a felicitous finale in favor of something far more unnerving. Even if the outcome is only partially effective, the attempt is admirable. Never mind its generic title, Prey is a finely photographed, paced, and performed evil islander".
