= Charming the Hearts of Men =

- Poster
- Directed by: S.E. DeRose
- Written by: S.E. DeRose
- Produced by: Richard T. Lewis
- Starring: Kelsey Grammer; Anna Friel; Sean Astin
- Cinematography: Gavin Struthers
- Edited by: Jo Francis; Lee Percy
- Music by: Mark Orton
- Distributed by: Gravitas Ventures
- Release date: August 13, 2021
- Running time: 107 minutes
- Country: United States
- Language: English

Charming the Hearts of Men is a 2021 American historical romantic drama film written and directed by S.E. DeRose and starring Kelsey Grammer, Anna Friel and Sean Astin. It is inspired by true events during the civil rights movement in 1964. It has been suggested that the character of the unnamed Congressman is loosely based on Congressman Howard W. Smith.

== Cast ==
- Anna Friel as Grace Gordon
- Kelsey Grammer as Congressman
- Starletta DuPois as Mattie
- Pauline Dyer as Jubilee
- Aml Ameen as Walter
- Sean Astin as George
- Hendrix Yancey as Angelina
- Jill Marie Jones as Viola
- Diane Ladd as Alice Paul
- Courtney Gains as Mr. Spratz
- Curtis Hamilton as Andrew
- Henry G. Sanders as Abel
- Justice Leak as Dick
- Tom Schanley as Bradford Lotts

== Release ==
In June 2021, it was announced that Gravitas Ventures acquired North American distribution rights to the film, which was released in theaters and On Demand on August 13, 2021.

== Reception ==
The film has an 80% rating on Rotten Tomatoes, based on 10 reviews.

Christian Gallichio of Film Threat rated the film a 5 out of 10 and wrote, "Despite the pedigree and performances, the overall political sentiments and underdeveloped script hold Charming the Hearts of Man back from presenting a fully realized portrait of the 1964 Civil Rights Act.”
