= Coyote (2013 film) =

- Directed by: Joe Eddy
- Written by: Joe Eddy
- Produced by: Joe Eddy; Robert J. Steinmiller Jr. Tasha Tae
- Starring: Robert J. Steinmiller Jr.; Carlos Pratts
- Cinematography: Rainer Lipski
- Edited by: Marcin Teodoru
- Production company: Toe Pictures
- Distributed by: Gravitas Ventures
- Release dates: 6 June 2013 (Dances With Films Festival); 1 January 2014 (US)
- Running time: 91 minutes
- Country: United States
- Language: English

Coyote is a 2013 American comedy-drama film directed by Joe Eddy, starring Robert J. Steinmiller Jr. and Carlos Pratts.

== Cast ==
- Robert J. Steinmiller Jr. as Brian
- Carlos Pratts as Manuel
- Jan Broberg as Mrs. Herlihy
- Augie Duke as Maggie
- Fernanda Romero as Lilly
- Carlos Gomez as Rosales
- Frank Alvarez as Carlos
- Andre Brooks as Mel
- Nick Ortega as Chris
- Dennis W. Hall as Uncle Jimmy
- Burton Perez as Martin
- Aaron Hendry as Dr. Dave
- Javier Ronceros as Ruben
- Anthony Dilio as El Pescador
- Alejandra Flores as Mama
- Lorne Hughes as George Stipley

== Reception ==
Chris Packham of The Village Voice called the film "sharp" and "funny", and wrote that the narrative "hinges at every turn on moments of human connection, scary confrontations other films would resolve with violence finding unexpected (and probably unlikely) detours into humor and empathy."

Annlee Ellingson of the Los Angeles Times wrote that the film is "sincere but relies on obvious tropes", and that "Amid familiar jokes that fall flat, unaided by awkward pacing, Brian absorbs these life lessons with the earnestness of a Muppet."
