= Josh Cowdery =

American actor

- Born: Joshua Wayne Cowdery; December 23, 1978 (age 47); Little Rock, Arkansas, U.S.
- Education: University of Arkansas
- Occupation: Actor
- Years active: 2009-present

Josh Cowdery (born December 23, 1978) is an American actor. He is known in film for Fantastic Beasts and Where to Find Them (2016) and in television for Agents of S.H.I.E.L.D. (2013) and Legends (2014).

== Early life ==
Cowdery was born on December 23, 1978, in Little Rock, Arkansas. While attending Sylvan Hills High School in Sherwood, Arkansas, he helped form an improv group with close friend Wes Bentley and his brother Patrick, along with Damien Bunting; aptly called B(3) + C. He later graduated from University of Arkansas with a degree in Marketing Management and minors in Acting and Psychology.

== Career ==
In 2012, Cowdery made an appearance in The Avengers. Subsequently, his character crossed over into the MCU TV series Agents of S.H.I.E.L.D. in 2013.

In 2016, he portrayed Henry Shaw Jr. in Fantastic Beasts and Where to Find Them.

== Filmography ==
=== Film ===
Year	Title	Role	Notes
2009	Couples Retreat	Motorcycle Shopper	Uncredited
2012	Hirokin: The Last Samurai	Rebel Leader	
2012	The Avengers	Agent Tyler	Credited as "Maintenance Guy"
2014	Godzilla	Pilot	
2015	i-Lived	Executive #2	
2016	Fantastic Beasts and Where to Find Them	Senator Henry Shaw Jr.	
2021	Wrath of Man	FBI Agent Hubbard	
2025	100 Nights of Hero	Beacked Brother Hugo	

=== Television ===
Year	Title	Role	Notes
2012	Sullivan & Son	Young Guy	1 episode
2013	Agents of S.H.I.E.L.D.	Agent Tyler	1 episode
2015	Legends	Agent Smith	2 episodes
2018	Mars	Chris Owens	1 episode
2021	Fate: The Winx Saga	Mike Peters	2 episodes

=== Video games ===
Year	Title	Role	Notes
2017	Lego Marvel Super Heroes 2	Steve Rogers / Captain America	Voice role
2022	Triangle Strategy	Flanagan, Sycras	Voice role
2022	Lego Star Wars: The Skywalker Saga	Poe Dameron	Voice role
2023	Killer Frequency	Forrest Nash	Voice role
