= Wrong Turn at Tahoe =

- Directed by: Franck Khalfoun
- Written by: Eddie Nickerson
- Produced by: Robert L. Levy; Freddy Braidy; Rich Cowan; Johnny Martin; Richard Salvatore
- Starring: Cuba Gooding Jr.; Miguel Ferrer; Mike Starr; Johnny Messner; Harvey Keitel
- Cinematography: Christopher LaVasseur
- Edited by: Patrick McMahon
- Music by: Nicholas Pike
- Production companies: Paramount Famous Productions; North by Northwest Entertainment; Pure Pictures Entertainment
- Distributed by: Paramount Home Entertainment
- Release date: November 17, 2009
- Running time: 91 minutes
- Country: United States
- Language: English
- Budget: $6 million

Wrong Turn at Tahoe is a 2009 American action film directed by Franck Khalfoun and starring Cuba Gooding Jr., Miguel Ferrer, and Harvey Keitel. The film was released direct-to-video by Paramount Home Entertainment on November 17, 2009.

== Plot ==
Joshua and his boss, Vincent, are driving to a hospital. Both have been shot and are in pain. Joshua thinks back to his childhood, when his father was shot in front of his eyes.

In a flashback, Joshua and his partner, Mickey, visit people that owe money to Vincent. They encounter a crazy druggie who tells them that a small-time drug dealer named Frankie Tahoe wants to kill Vincent. Joshua and Mickey inform Vincent, and the trio intimidate a guy who works for Tahoe into telling them where he can be found. They find Tahoe at a nightclub. During a talk, Tahoe insults the religion of Joshua and Vincent, which they hold dear, and Vincent beats Tahoe to death with a baseball bat. The trio dump the body in a landfill. While doing this, Vincent reveals that Mickey and Vincent's wife have been having an affair. Vincent then kills Mickey.

While Joshua and Vincent are having breakfast, Joshua tells his boss that he has become weary of the violence and wants to retire. Vincent admits that he has violent outbursts but insists that Joshua owes him his life. Angered, Vincent says that Joshua cannot retire. He leaves to go home, where he discovers two men watching his house. While confronting them, Joshua appears. The men tell Vincent that they have been ordered to deliver him to Nino, a powerful crime boss. When Nino calls his men, Vincent answers the cellphone. Vincent and Joshua get in the car and are driven to Nino's house.

After Nino taunts Vincent with a choice of restitution methods for killing Tahoe, all of them expensive, Vincent rejects every option. Nino is insulted and walks away. Vincent and Joshua leave. Upon arriving back at his house, Vincent finds that his wife has been brutally murdered. Vincent attempts to give Joshua $50,000 as severance and tells him to leave the city. Joshua refuses and says that he will not retire while Nino is still alive. They wait until night and return to Nino's house to seek vengeance. While Joshua takes the downstairs, fighting his way through many of Nino's henchmen, Vincent goes upstairs and finds Nino, who has donned a bullet-proof vest and is waiting for him, sawed-off shotgun in hand. The fight is prolonged; Vincent is hit but survives, and Nino dies in a large pool of blood.

Meanwhile, Joshua engages in a hand-to-hand fight with one of Nino's men and finally strangles him, only to have another appear. As this man is about to slice Joshua's throat, Vincent shows up and shoots him, but the man does not die right away. Joshua identifies the wounded man as the one who killed Vincent's wife. Vincent uses the man's knife to eviscerate him. While the two leave the house, Nino's wife appears. She and Joshua exchange fire and both are hit. The wife dies, but Joshua, who has been hit in the stomach, is able to walk away.

Back in the present, Vincent is driving the car and Joshua is in the back seat. At that point, Joshua remembers that it was Vincent who murdered his father. Joshua places a handgun to the back of Vincent's head. Vincent tells Joshua that he is too loyal to kill his own boss. The scene fades to black, leaving it unresolved as to whether Joshua pulls the trigger.

== Cast ==
- Cuba Gooding Jr. as Joshua
- Miguel Ferrer as Vincent
- Harvey Keitel as Nino
- Mike Starr as Paulie
- Johnny Messner as Mickey
- Alex Meneses as Marisa
- Leonor Varela as Anna
- Louis Mandylor as Steven
- Noel G. as Frankie Tahoe
- Paul Sampson as Richie
- John Cenatiempo as Johnny
- Genevieve Alexandra as Tiff
- Reed McColm as Donnie
- Michael Sean Tighe as Jeff
- Rich Warren as Anthony
- Walter Poole as Gregory, Bodyguard

== Production ==
The film was shot in Spokane, Washington.

== Reception ==
Jamie Russell of Radio Times rated it 2/5 stars and called it a forgettable thriller that copies Quentin Tarantino. Jim Kershner of The Spokesman Review called it "Tarantino-light". Bill Gibron of PopMatters rated it 5/10 stars and wrote, "In essence, Wrong Turn at Tahoe is film noir without the pulsating plot undercurrent or aesthetic flare. The result is all mood and no movement." Tyler Foster of DVD Talk rated it 2/5 stars and wrote that Ferrer's performance, which he praised, is not enough to make the film entertaining enough for a recommendation. Daryl Loomis of DVD Verdict wrote, "There are heavy shades of Tarantino and Scorsese, but they make it their own".
