= Franck Khalfoun =

French film director and screenwriter (born 1968)

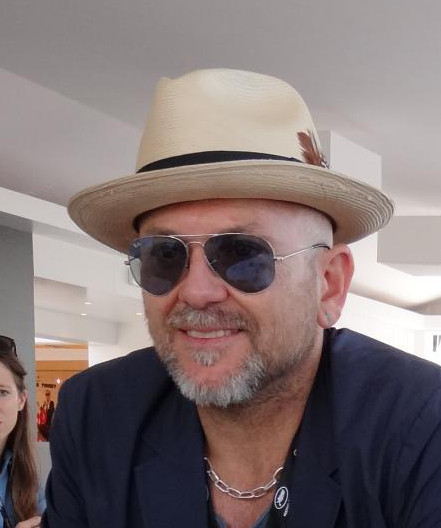
- Khalfoun at the 2012 Cannes Film Festival
- Born: Franck Ange Khalfoun; 9 March 1968 (age 58); Paris, France
- Occupations: Film director, screenwriter
- Years active: 1992–present

Franck Ange Khalfoun (born 9 March 1968) is a French film director and screenwriter, known for directing P2, Wrong Turn at Tahoe, Maniac, and the Amityville franchise entry Amityville: The Awakening. His latest film was the 2019 horror film Prey. His upcoming film is the action-thriller film Entry Level.

== Filmography ==
Film

Year	Title	Director	Writer	Producer	Editor
2007	P2	Yes	Yes		
2009	Wrong Turn at Tahoe	Yes			
2012	Maniac	Yes			Yes
2015	i-Lived	Yes	Yes	Yes	Yes
2017	Amityville: The Awakening	Yes	Yes		
2019	Prey	Yes	Yes		
2023	Night of the Hunted	Yes	Yes		

Acting roles

Year	Title	Role	Notes
1992	Day of Atonement	Maurice's Bodyguard	
1994	The Eagle and the Horse	The Truck Driver	TV movie
2003	Snowboarder	X	
2003	High Tension	Jimmy	
2007	P2	Newsman	
2010	Piranha 3D	Deputy Green	
2015	i-Lived	Detective McQuee	
2016	Lowriders	Marc Ochs	

Other roles

Year	Title	Director	Writer	Producer	Editor	Notes
2014	All Corrupt Everything			Executive	Yes	Short film
2018	Lifer	Yes	Yes			Miniseries
