= A Friend of the Family (miniseries) =

2022 American biographical crime drama miniseries

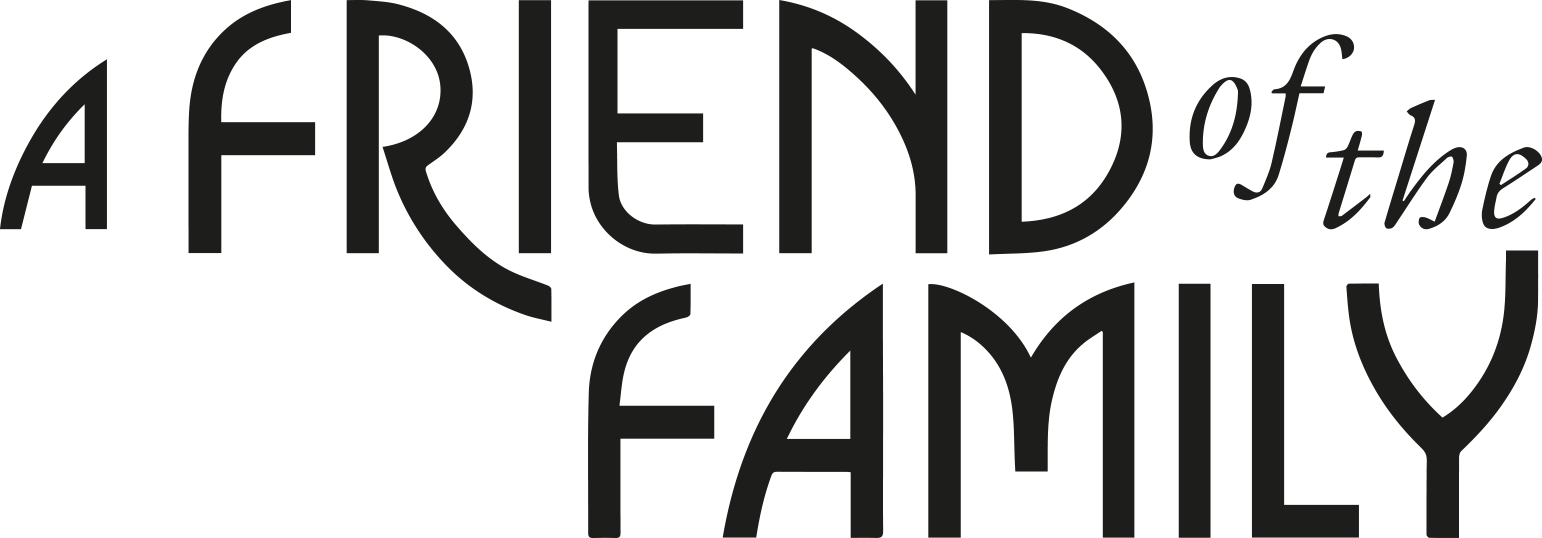
- Created by: Nick Antosca
- Starring: Jake Lacy; Colin Hanks; Lio Tipton; Hendrix Yancey; Anna Paquin; Mckenna Grace
- Music by: Ariel Marx
- Country of origin: United States
- Original language: English
- No. of episodes: 9

Production
- Executive producers: Nick Antosca; Alex Hedlund; Eliza Hittman
- Producers: Jan Broberg; Mary Ann Broberg
- Running time: 51–56 minutes
- Production companies: Eat the Cat; Universal Content Productions

Original release
- Network: Peacock
- Release: October 6 – November 10, 2022

A Friend of the Family is an American biographical crime drama miniseries. Based on true events, it follows Robert Berchtold (Jake Lacy), who, in the 1970s, sexually abused and twice kidnapped Jan Broberg (Hendrix Yancey and Mckenna Grace). Colin Hanks, Lio Tipton, and Anna Paquin appear in supporting roles. The series was released between October 6 and November 10, 2022, on Peacock.

Nick Antosca created the show after reading Stolen Innocence: The Jan Broberg Story (2003) and watching Abducted in Plain Sight (2017), both of which discuss Broberg's kidnappings. Antosca thought Broberg's story was too intricate for Abducted in Plain Sight's 90-minute runtime and sought to retell the events with more context and depth. Broberg and her mother, Mary Ann, served as producers on the show; Jan was often invited to the writers room to provide suggestions. Production occurred between February and August 2022 in Atlanta, Georgia; and Los Angeles, California. Critics gave A Friend of the Family positive reviews, and praised Eliza Hittman's direction and Lacy's performance.

== Cast and characters ==
=== Main ===
- Jake Lacy as Robert Berchtold
- Colin Hanks as Bob Broberg, Mary's husband and Jan's dad
- Anna Paquin as Mary Ann Broberg, Bob's wife and Jan's mom
- Lio Tipton as Gail Berchtold, Robert's ex-wife
- Mckenna Grace as Jan Broberg
  - Hendrix Yancey as young Jan Broberg

=== Recurring ===
- Austin Stowell as FBI Agent Peter Walsh
- Patrick Fischler as Garth Pincock
- Philip Ettinger as Joe Berchtold
- Maggie Sonnier as Karen Broberg
  - Mila Harris as young Karen Broberg
- Norah Murphy as Susan Broberg
  - Elle Lisic as young Susan Broberg
- Tyler Wojton as Joel Berchtold
- Bree Elrod as Jennifer Ferguson
- Ella Jay Basco as Sofia
- Callie Johnson as Cop #4
- Kate Adams as Eileen
- Keilah Davies as Young Caroline Hansen
- Jan Broberg as Jan's psychologist

== Episodes ==
| No. | Title | Directed by | Written by | Original release date |
|---|---|---|---|---|
| 1 | "Horseback Riding in American Falls" | Eliza Hittman | Nick Antosca | October 6, 2022 |
In the 1970s, Mary Ann and Bob Broberg, and their children, Jan, Karen, and Susan, meet their new neighbors. Robert Berchtold, the patriarch, shows an unhealthy interest in Jan. After Jan's piano lesson, Robert wants to pick her up and manipulates Mary Ann into letting him do so, despite Bob's disapproval. Jan, who has been drugged, becomes sleepy during the drive. Jan's parents become concerned and contact Robert's wife, Gail. Gail says Robert has depression and that she followed him to a storage unit where Robert was working in a motorhome when he left the house. The Brobergs are eager to call the police, but Gail tells them about Robert's depression which began after the Berchtolds failed to adopt a child from Mexico. Mary Ann calls the police, but is relieved to find no car matching Robert's has been involved in an accident. Bob has trouble sleeping and tells Mary Ann he will confront Robert if he and Jan return. Mary Ann thinks about her conversation with Robert after Jan's lesson in which Robert told Mary Ann he wished they had met earlier. Jan wakes; she is tied to a bed and hears a voice repeatedly saying "female companion".
| 2 | "The Mission" | Rachel Goldberg | Teleplay by : Brian Chamberlayne; Story by : Brian Chamberlayne & Rachael Paradis | October 6, 2022 |
Jan wakes and hears a voice instructing her to find a male companion. Robert claims she has been selected for a special assignment and that awful things will happen if she refuses. Mary Ann and Bob call the police, and the local FBI arrives a few days later. They discover Robert's car has been found with a broken window and blood. The FBI learns that Robert has been giving Jan anti-allergy pills since her abduction. Bob's psychiatrist reveals Robert has an unhealthy interest in children. The FBI tries to spread the story, but Jan remains missing after two weeks. Mary Ann calls Robert's brother Joe and learns Robert has agreed to return Jan if he can marry her. The FBI traces Robert to Mexico through his calls. Robert is arrested and placed in custody, but he bribes a guard to allow him a few moments with Jan. Robert instructs Jan to continue the mission, cease contact with other male companions, and not tell the authorities about the pills or "baby stuff". Jan's parents take her home and Bob looks at a paper he received in Mexico; it is a marriage certificate for Jan and Robert.
| 3 | "The Gift of Tongues" | Eliza Hittman | Teleplay by : Lucy Teitler; Story by : Lucy Teitler & Julia Batavia | October 6, 2022 |
In 1972, two years before Jan's abduction, Bob and Mary Ann are happy. Robert introduces himself to the community and invites Mary Ann to accompany the children on the school run. Robert picks up the children and takes them to school. Robert visits Bob at work and talks about his intimacy issues with Gail. Robert confides in Bob and Bob asks Mary Ann to help with their issues. Robert later asks Mary Ann and Bob to safeguard his children if something befalls him or Gail. At a ball, Robert dances with Mary Ann and tells her he wishes he had met her earlier. The Berchtolds invite Jan to see a play. When Jan becomes sleepy, Robert comforts her and takes her to a hotel room. Bob furiously demands the families spend less time together, prompting Robert to talk to him. Robert discusses his childhood and strained relationship with his stepfather. Later, Bob gives Robert a handjob. Bob is ashamed of himself. When Mary Ann suggests having sex, Bob replies he is tired. The next day, Bob finds Robert making a separate bedroom for Jan. In 1974, Robert is released from prison and returns home.
| 4 | "Articles of Faith" | Rachel Goldberg | Marie Hanhnhon Nguyen | October 6, 2022 |
Mary Ann takes Jan to a doctor who says nothing sexual appears to have occurred during her kidnapping. When Mary Ann asks Jan about Mexico, Jan becomes enraged and demands everything return to normal. The FBI visit the Brobergs, and inform them Robert is returning from Mexico and will remain free until his trial. Agent Walsh insists the Brobergs must not speak with Robert under any circumstances. During Christmas, Jan finds a wedding ring Robert gave her in Mexico. Gail tells Bob she knows about his sexual encounter with Robert. Later, Bob hints at events between himself and Robert which Mary Ann finds difficult to believe. She visits Jennifer Ferguson and signs an affidavit stating she and Bob granted Robert permission to take Jan to Mexico. The district attorney is outraged but they agree a hearing must still take place. Jan says Robert did not hurt her. During her testimony, Jennifer portrays Mary Ann as a neglectful parent. Robert reminds Jan of her "mission". Bob confesses his sexual encounter with Robert to their local church leaders, who disfellowship him. Jan prays for Jasper, Robert's sick son. Meanwhile, Robert tells Mary Ann he loves her and they kiss.
| 5 | "The Bitter Cup" | Steven Piet | Brian Evenson | October 13, 2022 |
Mary Ann feels guilty about having an affair with Robert. Bob asks Robert about some flowers and a card saying "Forever, B" Jan received but Robert tells him to return home. The next day, a voice coming from a mini-speaker informs Jan her father is in danger and that she must continue with the mission. In 1975, Mary Ann cuts off Robert's call. Jennifer invites Mary Ann to a meeting in early 1976 and threatens to out Bob if the case goes to trial. When Mary Ann admits to having sex with Robert, Bob is outraged. He notifies her that divorce papers will soon be filed because she poses a serious risk to their children. Mary Ann leaves the house to stay with her mother and sister and Robert watches over Jan at night. Robert tells Jan to marry him and travel to Wyoming. Jan tells her parents she has accepted a summer job there. Mary Ann begs Bob for his forgiveness and they reconcile. In July 1976, Robert is given a five-year jail term, but serves only ten days. Jan leaves home and her family is unable to find her.
| 6 | "Son of Perdition" | Steven Piet | Alana B. Lytle | October 20, 2022 |
Robert takes Jan to his business called Family Fun Center. Jan meets Jasper and business partner. Walsh tells the Brobergs the FBI cannot intervene because Jan has willingly run away. The Brobergs meet with the attorney Mark, who contacts Robert's lawyer. Meanwhile, Robert takes Jan to a play and reminds her of her "mission". On Jan's 14th birthday, Mark demands she be returned home. Robert manipulates Jan with lies about her parents and sends her home. Walsh informs the Brobergs his friend said Robert may be classified as a psychopath due to his obsession with young girls. When he sees Jan and Robert, Bob contemplates using a gun, but decides against it. Jan tells her parents she wants to marry Robert. Bob and Mary Ann learn that to secure Robert's conviction, Jan must recount her experiences due to a lack of physical evidence. Robert tells Gail their divorce will soon be finalized. Jan argues with her parents and prays for her family's safety if she completes the mission. Later, Jan's parents find her bedroom empty with a note saying she has run away, which Walsh suspects Robert wrote. Mary Ann calls Robert, who says he does not know Jan's location.
| 7 | "The Great Deceiver" | Jamie Travis | Brian Chamberlayne | October 27, 2022 |
Walsh tells the Brobergs their situation cannot be seen as a kidnapping case. Walsh is devoted to supporting them and places a recording device in their home. Robert makes a call to the Brobergs' home and Mary Ann berates him for kidnapping Jan. Later, Robert accuses Walsh of harassing him, and Walsh is instructed to abandon the Brobergs' case. Gail asks Mary Ann to grant Robert permission to marry Jan. The Brobergs ask for an FBI investigation but Walsh and the bureau are unable to issue any executive orders due to the lack of evidence. Walsh asks police in Ogden, Utah to monitor Robert. The Brobergs visit Ogden to check if Jan is with Robert. A few weeks earlier, Robert leaves Jan at a convent and instructs her to avoid interacting and making friends with people her own age. Jan is enrolled in an all-girls Catholic school under a pseudonym and Robert tells the nuns a carefully crafted story to prevent suspicion. He later gives Jan a letter and forces her to copy it. The Brobergs receive the letter in which says Jan wants to marry Robert.
| 8 | "Outer Darkness" | Jamie Travis | Teleplay by : Lucy Teitler; Story by : Lucy Teitler & Diana Pawell | November 3, 2022 |
Robert calls the Brobergs and feigns ignorance regarding Jan's location, but invites Mary Ann to discuss in person, aware that calls are being monitored. Meanwhile, Jan struggles at boarding school, confiding in her roommate Sofia, who suggests auditioning for a play. During a beach trip, Robert learns about Jan's audition and becomes enraged, leading to a car accident where she sustains a head injury. Robert manipulates Jan by threatening her sisters. Later, a desperate Mary Ann meets Robert. He attempts to persuade her to sign the marriage proposal to locate Jan. Mary Ann resists his demands, escalating Robert's aggression, and leaves without uncovering Jan's location. At boarding school, sister Ramona questions Jan about her injury. In frustration, Jan contacts Mary Ann, who is ecstatic to reconnect, and inquires about the marriage papers. This conversation becomes critical evidence for the FBI. Ramona informs Robert about a police inquiry. Worried, Robert reassures Ramona that the officers are impostors. Later, the police surround him at his motorhome. Realizing there is no escape, he gives himself up. As Pete returns Jan home, he advises her to show kindness to her parents, though she remains angry at them due to Robert's influence.
| 9 | "Revelation" | Lauren Wolkstein | Nick Antosca & Brian Evenson & Alana B. Lytle | November 10, 2022 |
In a flashback, Robert manipulates Jan into believing that she must get pregnant before her 16th birthday to protect her family from the wrath of the aliens. At home, Jan struggles with her identity and familial bonds in the aftermath of her experiences with Robert. The Broberg family experiences difficulty in addressing Jan's trauma, while Robert faces legal consequences but ultimately avoids jail time due to his connections, landing instead in a mental health facility. Later, Robert reconnects with Jan by inviting her out, promising to alleviate familial concerns. On Jan's 16th birthday, Bob hosts a celebration and a classmate, Eric, invites her to prom, but Jan declines. She discovers a communication device in her sister's room that triggers memories of alien communication linked to Robert. The next morning, she finds her family alive and healthy. She attends prom with Eric and does not evaporate when touching him, contradicting what Robert told her. Later at home, Jan sobs and explains Robert's story to her family. Robert calls their home, but she hangs up the phone. Details of the case proceeding and subsequent events, including Berchtold's suicide and Broberg's acting career, are shown.

== Production ==
=== Development ===
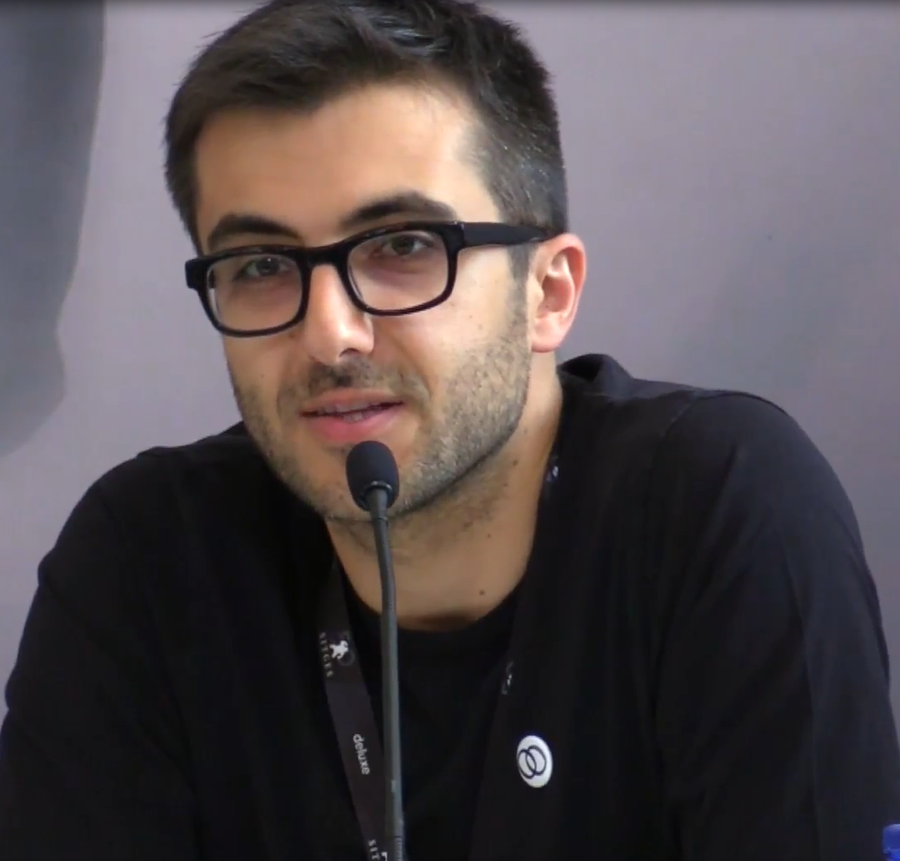
Nick Antosca wanted to retell Jan Broberg's story after watching Abducted in Plain Sight (2017).

Robert Berchtold, a close family friend, kidnapped and sexually assaulted Jan Broberg at ages 12 and 14. Jan and her mother, Mary Ann Broberg, wrote a memoir titled Stolen Innocence: The Jan Broberg Story (2003) about these events. In 2017, Broberg told her story in the television documentary Abducted in Plain Sight. After watching the documentary, Nick Antosca was preoccupied with it and considered Broberg's family fascinating. He later read Stolen Innocence, which he said "was relatable in that we all have vulnerabilities that somebody can use against us". Despite admiring Abducted in Plain Sight, Antosca thought the story was too intricate for an 90-minute runtime; he wanted to work with Broberg and her family to retell the events with more context and depth. Antosca and his colleagues studied many trial transcripts, FBI notes, interviews, and childhood journals about the case. From the show's conception, he knew it would not include anything "exploitative or potentially gratuitous or uncomfortable". Antosca said viewers should be able to process each part of the story without being overwhelmed by anything that felt exploitative. He said A Friend of the Family should not show any of Broberg's abuse as a teenager, believing it would not serve the series' purpose.

Jan Broberg had received several offers to tell her story in a feature film, television film, or miniseries but she thought the pitches were "too slick" and asked questions like "How did you ever forgive your parents?" that lacked understanding about her family's experiences. In March 2019, Antosca and Alex Hedlund contacted her about the project; she said he distinguished himself from other filmmakers in wanting to tell her story in his "sincerely empathetic" approach. Antosca stated he did not want to tell Broberg's story unless it benefited her family. In A Friend of the Family, he wanted to explain her parents' actions and choices, which he deemed only possible with her assistance. The Brobergs hoped the show would help people recognize grooming, coercion, and manipulation. The writers often invited Jan to give detailed suggestions. According to Antosca, she was vital to the "human story" depicted in the series, which is more immersive, empathetic, and relatable for the viewer. Broberg stated she has told her story many times "because I want to help people see it before it's too late", and abuse from known, loved and trusted people is common but not discussed enough.

In May 2020, it was announced Universal Content Productions was developing a series about Broberg's kidnappings; Antosca was to write and executive produce the series under his banner Eat the Cat, and Jan and Mary Ann Broberg would serve as producers. In February 2022, the streaming platform Peacock gave the show a straight-to-series order with Eliza Hittman as director and executive producer. Hittman had never heard about Broberg's story before receiving the script for A Friend of the Family but she admired the show's writing, characters, and world so much she "devoured" its script. Her direction was not influenced by Abducted in Plain Sight due to the large number of omissions and limited duration. Since Abducted in Plain Sight's production, true crime dramas had gained in popularity, prompting Hittman to contemplate the genre's ethics. Broberg was serving as producer, which Hittman described as a rare occasion in which the victim had granted consent, encouraging her to work on the project. According to Antosca, Hittman was a key part of the sensitive psychological and character-driven scenes.

=== Casting ===
Vanity Fair said A Friend of the Family was barely a "dutiful retelling". Broberg anticipated the cast would develop their own understanding of their characters. She knew they did not want to mimic her family. Broberg addressed letters to the main cast, assuring them she would not hinder any decisions or interpretations they made. She also wanted the actors to understand every character—including Berchtold—was a "full human being".

Although she was not involved in the final casting selections, Broberg extensively spoke to Antosca about Robert Berchtold's character and the importance of portraying him as credible, loving parent. Jake Lacy was cast as Robert Berchtold; Lacy was initially apprehensive about the role but Broberg's involvement and commitment persuaded him. Lacy was drawn to the show's nuanced presentation of the events, which showed the Broberg family as human beings rather than as victims of a sensational crime. To prepare, Lacy read Lolita (1955), a novel in which the middle-aged narrator abducts and sexually abuses a 12-year-old girl with whom he is obsessed, and took inspiration from the ego and charm of Ocean's Eleven character Danny Ocean and American actor Steve McQueen. Antosca gave Lacy a number of Jan and Mary Ann's personal possessions, including FBI recordings of telephone calls between the Brobergs and Berchtold after Jan's second kidnapping, in which he pretends not to know her location. Lacy was hesitant about becoming close to Jan Broberg because he feared he would be unable to portray Berchtold's inhumanity and obsessiveness, they met during the second episode's production, which "helped settle the work more than shake it up because you get to see the person you're doing this for".

Prior to receiving the script for A Friend of the Family, Colin Hanks had not heard Broberg's story; he almost declined the role of Bob Broberg, not wanting to play "a super nice Mormon that goes through a bunch of stuff". Hanks watched Abducted in Plain Sight after reading the first three screenplays. He could not stop thinking about the Brobergs' story and discussed it with many people. After two years of the COVID-19 pandemic, Hanks challenged himself to work on projects that scared him. He found Bob was a difficult character to portray, saying he had no similarities to the character and that he was "so petrified". Lio Tipton, who portrays Gail Berchtold, was interested in the show due to the Brobergs' involvement, and was also a fan of Antosca and Hittman.

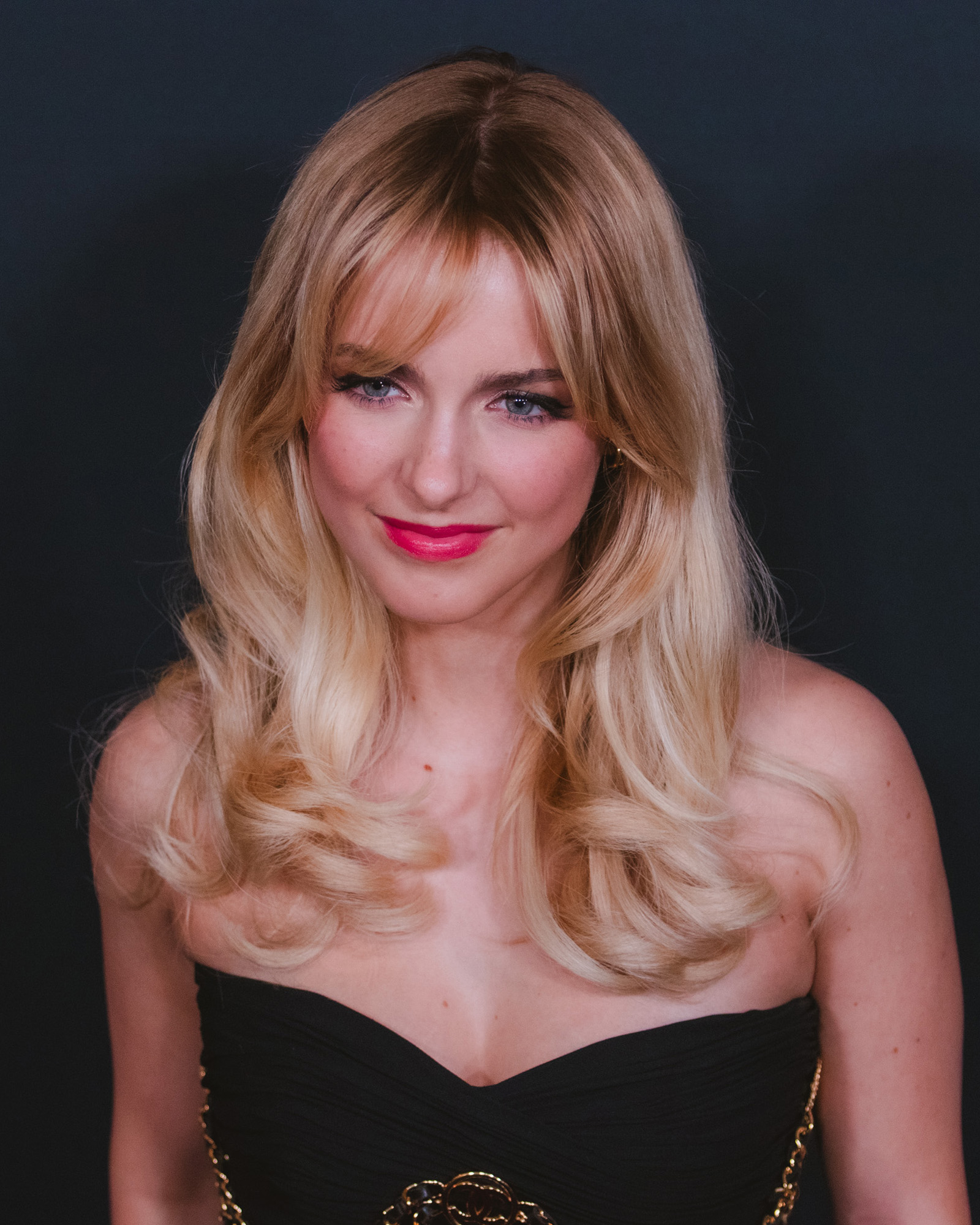
Mckenna Grace (left) and Hendrix Yancey share the role of Jan Broberg.

Hendrix Yancey and Mckenna Grace portray younger and older versions of Jan Broberg, respectively. Antosca was insistent on not casting adult actors who looked young for the role. Grace studied Broberg's story in depth, reading Stolen Innocence, court documents, diary entries, and letters between Broberg and Berchtold. While filming, Grace tried to spend as much time as she could with Yancey. and copied her mannerisms and smile. Grace also worked alongside Broberg.

The show also stars Anna Paquin as Mary Ann Broberg, Jan's mother. The recurring cast includes Austin Stowell as FBI Agent Peter Walsh, who is determined to return Jan to her family; Patrick Fischler as Garth Pincock, Bannock County's district attorney; Bree Elrod as Jennifer Ferguson, Berchtold's lawyer; Philip Ettinger as Joe Berchtold, Robert's brother; and Ella Jay Basco as Sofia. Jan Broberg, who is an actress herself, appears twice in the show. At the start of the show, she introduces herself and explains her story. This was done to assure viewers that she survives and to lend credibility to the narrative, as the events depicted are, according to Lacy, "nearly unbelievable, unless someone says, 'This happened'". In the final episode, Broberg makes a cameo as Dr. Carr, a therapist who worked with her family. She referred to her appearance in A Friend of the Family as freeing; she explained that it gave her the opportunity to guide her younger self and offer consolation to her father, who she thought never truly forgave himself.

=== Filming and design ===
A Friend of the Family's design takes inspiration from Classical Realism films of the 1970s, including Badlands (1973) and Alice Doesn't Live Here Anymore (1974). Production designer John D. Kretschmer was influenced by his own Protestant home in North Carolina, which he deemed similar to Broberg's neighborhood. The production team recreated the Broberg family's house in Atlanta: they renovated a home atop a hill that was "a surprising visual match" by replicating the windows and floor plan. There was not much information available about Berchtold's house but Kretschmer knew he was wealthy and owned a piano and a plethora of games. The team used police reports to model the GMC 260 automobile he drove. Yancey and Grace wore some of Broberg's clothes from the period. In the final episode, Grace wears a reproduction of a dress Jan Broberg wore in a photograph. A Friend of the Family was primarily filmed in the Atlanta metropolitan area and some scenes were filmed in Los Angeles, California. Principal photography took place from February to August 2022. While filming the scene in which Berchtold drugs Broberg, the crew focused on ensuring the then 11-year-old Yancey felt safe.

== Release ==
A Friend of the Family's first four episodes were made available on the Peacock on October 6, 2022. The final five episodes were released weekly from October 13 to November 10.

== Reception ==
The review aggregator website Rotten Tomatoes reported a 92% approval rating for A Friend of the Family with an average rating of 7.8/10 based on 24 critical reviews. The website's critics' consensus reads; "Unspooling like a slow-motion nightmare, A Friend of the Family benefits immeasurably from Eliza Hittman's deft direction and Jake Lacy's unflinching portrayal of insidious evil". Metacritic, which uses a weighted average, assigned a score of 73 out of 100 based on 12 critics, indicating "generally favorable reviews".

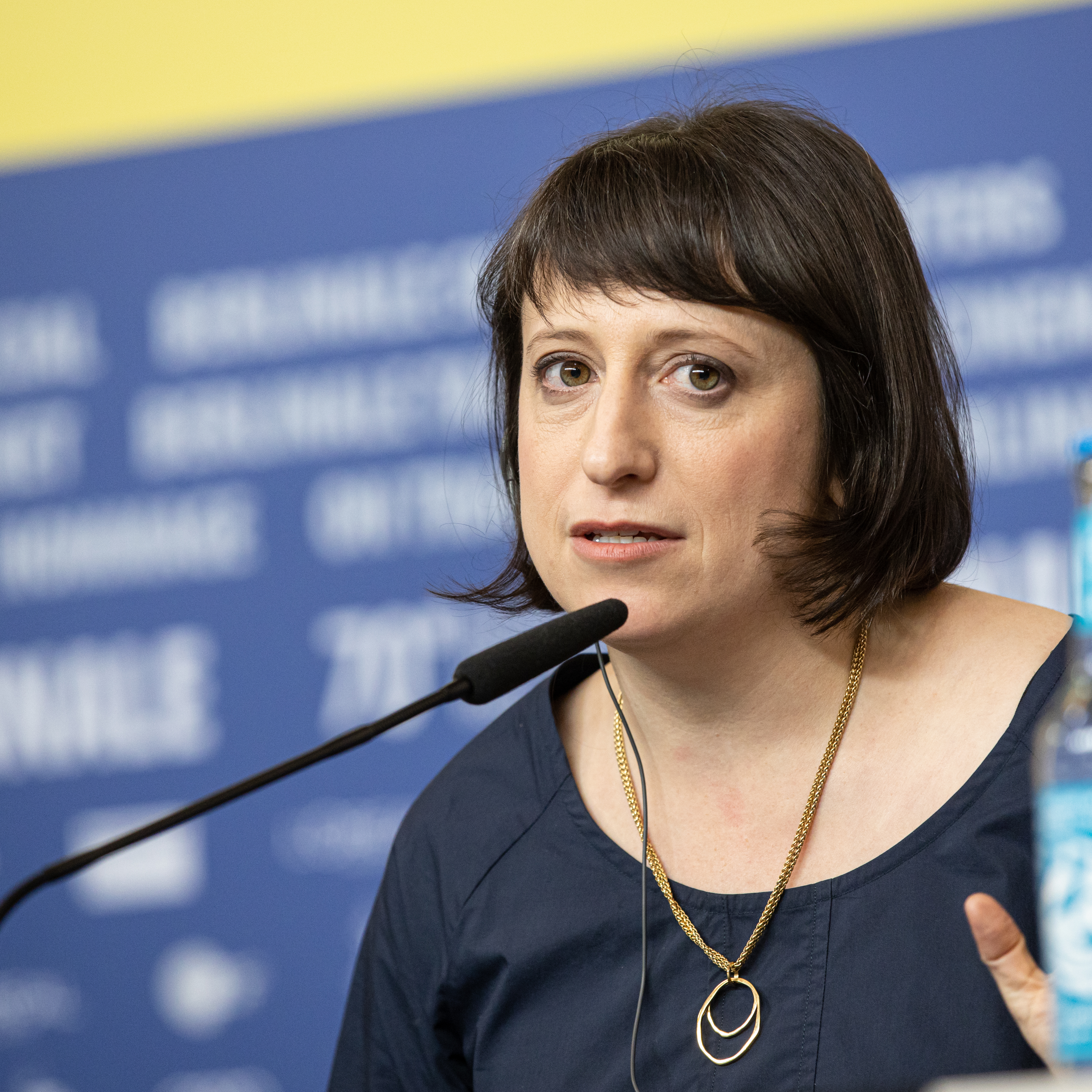
Hittman's direction received praise.

Journalists praised the show's portrayal of the true-crime genre. (Note: Attributed to reviews from MovieWeb, Consequence, and IGN) According to Slant Magazine, A Friend of the Family is able to "sidestep some common true-crime pitfalls" by focusing on the psychological effects rather than sexual abuse, and IndieWire writer Steve Greene said the series "has little concern for true-crime expectations". According to The Hollywood Reporter, A Friend of the Family mostly consists of "self-justification" for the Broberg family. Hittman's direction was well-received by critics. Greene said the show puts the viewer directly in Jan's shoes. Chase Hutchinson, from Collider, agreed, describing the direction as "understated yet no less upsetting". Several reviewers commented on the show's duration. Writing for The Daily Telegraph, Michael Hogan called the show "unnecessarily bloated". Kristen Baldwin of Entertainment Weekly said the show has difficulty sustaining its nine-hour duration due to a lack of insight and analysis. The A.V. Club's Saloni Gajjar stated nine episodes were warranted and called the show "compelling".

Critics praised Lacy's performance. TheWrap stated his performance on the show "lives and dies" and is deserving of an Emmy Award nomination. The Financial Times called him the show's highlight. According to IGN, Lacy conveys a sense of villainy simply by smiling widely and speaking softly. The rest of the cast also received praise: reviewers from MovieWeb and The A.V. Club referred to Paquin as "heartbreaking" and "quietly powerful", respectively, while Common Sense Media stated Tipton "gives ... Gail real depth, convincingly depicting a troubled woman frozen between shame". According to Variety's Joshua Alston, Tipton is able to give the character stability while maintaining a jittery, disturbing quality that is reminiscent of Lili Taylor. According to Baldwin, Yancey's and Grace's performances both have genuine warmth and vulnerability, and Hogan described Yancey as "heartbreakingly vulnerable". Entertainment website Ready Steady Cut dubbed Yancey and Grace the show's "MVPs", saying they "manage to fully convince and convey that they are in fact the one character at differing ages". RogerEbert.com's Brain Tallerico, however, said the show is less coherent with two actors playing Jan; he stated he would prefer only Grace portraying the character. MovieWeb deemed Hanks' performance his finest yet, but The Hollywood Reporter labeled him a "weak link".

== A Friend of the Family: True Evil ==
On November 15, 2022, Peacock released the documentary film A Friend of the Family: True Evil. It follows Jan Broberg's recovery as she revisits several places, including the bedroom where her sexual assaults began. It also includes the story of another victim of Berchtold. The documentary explores ways families deal with generational trauma, which can affect survivors and their loved ones years after the abuse occurred, through interviews with Jan Broberg, her mother and son, and other family members.
