= I-Lived =

2015 American film by Franck Khalfoun

i-Lived
- Teaser poster
- Directed by: Franck Khalfoun
- Written by: Franck Khalfoun
- Produced by: Ehud Bleiberg; Pavlina Hatoupis; Franck Khalfoun; Alix Taylor
- Starring: Jeremiah Watkins
- Cinematography: Christopher LaVasseur
- Edited by: Martinos Aristidou; Glenn Garland; Franck Khalfoun
- Music by: Mathieu Carratier; Greg Taieb
- Production companies: Bleiberg Entertainment; Ministry of Content
- Release date: July 3, 2015 (limited)
- Running time: 97 minutes
- Country: United States
- Language: English

i-Lived is a 2015 American horror thriller film written and directed by Franck Khalfoun.

== Plot ==
A young online app reviewer's latest assignment mysteriously improves his life but also starts to tear him apart, bringing his existence into a downward spiral.

== Cast ==
- Jan Broberg as Josh's Mom
- Franck Khalfoun as Detective McQuee (voice)
- Josh Cowdery as Executive #2
- Shannon Collis as Drunk Girl
- Luis Fernandez-Gil as Roberto Luis
- Jeremiah Watkins as Josh
- Thomas Payton as Zach
- Koral Michaels as Kidnapped Girl
- Nic D'Avirro as Josh's Dad

== Production ==
Filming took place in Los Angeles, California in May 2014.
