= Abducted in Plain Sight =

- Release poster
- Directed by: Skye Borgman
- Produced by: Skye Borgman; Emily Kincaid; Stephanie Tobey
- Cinematography: Skye Borgman
- Edited by: James Cude
- Music by: Carl Dante
- Production company: Top Knot Films
- Release date: May 26, 2017 (Mammoth Lakes Film Festival)
- Running time: 91 minutes
- Country: United States
- Language: English

Abducted in Plain Sight, also known as Forever B, is a 2017 true crime documentary film directed by Skye Borgman. The documentary covers the kidnappings of Jan Broberg, an Idaho child who was abducted by her neighbor Robert Berchtold in the 1970s on two occasions. It contains interview footage with Broberg. It was produced by Top Knot Films and released by Netflix in 2019. The story was first told in Stolen Innocence: The Jan Broberg Story, a memoir published by her and her mother in 2003.

== Reception ==
=== Critical response ===
On the review aggregator website Rotten Tomatoes, the film has an approval rating of 75%, based on 23 reviews, with an average rating of 6.9/10.

=== Accolades ===
Award	Category	Result	Ref.
Newport Beach Film Festival	Best Documentary	Won	
BendFilm Festival	Best Documentary	Won	
MDIFF-Hagerstown	Best Documentary	Won	
Phoenix Film Festival	Best Documentary	Won	
Mammoth Lakes Film Festival	Bravery Award	Won	
DOCUTAH Film Festival	Mayor's Award	Won	
Tallgrass Film Festival	Outstanding Female Filmmaker	Won	
