= Regretting You =

2025 film by Josh Boone

- Theatrical release poster
- Directed by: Josh Boone
- Screenplay by: Susan McMartin
- Based on: Regretting You by Colleen Hoover
- Produced by: Robert Kulzer; Brunson Green; Anna Todd; Flavia Viotti
- Starring: Allison Williams; Mckenna Grace; Dave Franco; Mason Thames; Scott Eastwood; Willa Fitzgerald
- Cinematography: Tim Orr
- Edited by: Marc Clark; Robb Sullivan
- Music by: Nathaniel Walcott
- Production companies: Constantin Film; Harbinger Pictures; Frayed Pages Entertainment; Heartbones Entertainment
- Distributed by: Constantin Film (Germany); Paramount Pictures (United States)
- Release dates: October 12, 2025 (Zoo Palast); October 23, 2025 (Germany); October 24, 2025 (United States)
- Running time: 116 minutes
- Countries: Germany; United States
- Language: English
- Budget: $25 million
- Box office: $90.5 million

Regretting You (marketed as Colleen Hoover's Regretting You) is a 2025 romantic drama film based on the 2019 novel by Colleen Hoover. It is directed by Josh Boone from a screenplay by Susan McMartin. It stars Allison Williams, Mckenna Grace, Dave Franco, and Mason Thames.

The film premiered at the Zoo Palast in Berlin on October 12, 2025, and was released by Constantin Film in Germany on October 23, 2025, and by Paramount Pictures in the United States on October 24. The film received generally negative reviews from critics, but was a modest box-office success, grossing $90.5 million worldwide on a budget of $25 million.

== Plot ==
Seventeen-year-old Morgan Davidson becomes pregnant by her boyfriend, Chris Grant. She confides this to Jonah Sullivan, her sister Jenny's boyfriend and Chris's best friend, who secretly has feelings for Morgan.

Seventeen years later, Chris and Morgan are married and raising their daughter, Clara. Jenny and Jonah have recently reunited after years apart, and have an infant son, Elijah. On Morgan's birthday, Clara encounters her classmate Miller Adams on the side of the road. He's moving the city limits sign inconspicuously a little every day to eventually be past his grandfather's house so they can order from their favorite pizzeria, which does not deliver beyond the city limits. She helps him, then drives him home. They learn that they both have aspirations of working in film.

After learning that Miller has a girlfriend, Shelby, Jenny cautions Clara not to meddle in their relationship. Morgan and Jonah speak privately, whereupon Morgan insists it is too late for them and Clara is her priority. Clara later learns that Shelby broke up with Miller over his budding attraction to Clara.

Chris and Jenny die in a traffic accident; Jonah and Morgan soon conclude that they were having an affair. During Chris' funeral, Morgan catches Clara smoking a preroll with Miller and grounds her. Clara demands to know why Morgan didn't organize Chris and Jenny's funerals together.

Later, Jonah and Morgan locate Chris's car in a hotel parking lot, confirming the affair. Morgan beats the car before driving it home. Clara questions Morgan about the damage, but Morgan declines to explain. Clara later sneaks out to see Miller, returning to find that Morgan has destroyed the kitchen door.

Jonah hands Elijah over to Morgan the next day, suspecting Chris may be Elijah's biological father. Clara confronts Jonah and persuades him to continue parenting Elijah, agreeing to help however she can.

The next day, after moving the city limits sign again, Miller admits to Clara his fear that nobody will look after his grandfather if he leaves for college, and they kiss. They later convince Clara's best friend Lexie to ask out Miller's friend Efren. At home, Jonah plays Morgan a song that reminds her of their childhood.

Morgan expresses disapproval in Clara and Miller's relationship, knowing their flirtation began while he was with Shelby. Morgan and Jonah later find hidden letters from Jenny to Chris, which he wants to ignore despite her protests. Morgan points out a painting that Jenny suggested she buy Chris for his birthday although she hated it, so they both egg it. Over time, Morgan distracts herself with remodeling, while Clara prepares college applications, and Jonah continues to take care of Elijah.

After discovering Jonah and Morgan kissing, a mortified Clara resolves to lose her virginity to Miller that night. They start to become intimate until she begins crying, realizing that her actions are motivated purely by spite toward her mother. He stays overnight to keep her company. In the morning, Morgan finds them asleep together and grounds Clara.

That evening, Morgan hosts an awkward birthday dinner party for Clara, inviting Miller, Lexie, and Jonah. Clara and Morgan bicker, resulting in Clara announcing that her dream college has accepted her with a scholarship. Overwhelmed by Clara's family drama, Miller leaves. A devastated Clara visits Chris and Jenny's graves with Lexie to share a drink, where Morgan finds them.

The next morning, Morgan tends to Clara's hangover, whereupon Clara expresses guilt over causing Chris and Jenny's deaths by texting Jenny. Morgan clarifies that Chris was driving and reveals their affair, but stresses that they both loved Clara. Morgan and Clara reconcile and give each other permission to be with people they love. Clara texts Miller an apology, and they reunite at the movie theater. That night, Morgan and Jonah profess their mutual love, have sex, and burn Jenny’s letters.

The family holds a party, where Miller plays a video for Clara, revealing he has been in love with her for two years and planned to break up with Shelby the first day they moved the city limits sign. She accepts his invitation to the prom. She and Morgan privately express mutual love and pride for each other.

In a mid-credits scene, Clara and Miller have finished moving the city limits sign past his grandfather's house, and Miller calls to order a pizza delivery.

== Cast ==
- Allison Williams as Morgan Grant
- Mckenna Grace as Clara Grant, Morgan's daughter
  - Aubrey Brockwell as young Clara
- Dave Franco as Jonah Sullivan
- Mason Thames as Miller Adams
- Scott Eastwood as Chris Grant, Morgan's husband and Clara's father
- Willa Fitzgerald as Jenny Davidson, Morgan's younger sister and Jonah's partner
- Clancy Brown as Hank "Gramps" Adams, Miller's grandfather
- Sam Morelos as Lexie, Clara's best friend.
- Ethan Costanilla as Efren, Miller's best friend.

== Production ==
In August 2024, it was announced that an adaptation of Regretting You was in development, with Josh Boone directing, and Allison Williams, Mckenna Grace, Dave Franco and Mason Thames starring. In March 2025, Willa Fitzgerald and Scott Eastwood boarded the cast of the film. Clancy Brown, Sam Morelos, and Ethan Costanilla rounded out the cast that same month. Principal photography began in March 2025, in Atlanta. Marc Clark and Robb Sullivan served as the film's editors. Nathaniel Walcott composed the film's score, having previously collaborated with Josh Boone on Stuck in Love (2012), The Fault in Our Stars (2014), and The Stand (2020–21).

== Release ==
Regretting You premiered in Berlin, Germany on October 12, 2025. The film was released in the United States on October 24, 2025.

=== Streaming ===
Regretting You premiered on Paramount+ on December 23, 2025.

=== Home media ===
The film was released on Blu-ray and DVD on February 17, 2026.

== Reception ==
=== Box office ===
Regretting You grossed $48.9 million in the United States and Canada, and $41.6 million in other territories, for a worldwide total of $90.5 million. The film grossed $13.7 million in its debut weekend, finishing second behind Chainsaw Man – The Movie: Reze Arc.

=== Critical response ===
On the review aggregator website Rotten Tomatoes, 29% of 89 critics' reviews are positive, with an average rating of 4.2/10. The website's consensus reads: "Regrettable all around." Metacritic, which uses a weighted average, assigned the film a score of 33 out of 100, based on 20 critics, indicating "generally unfavorable" reviews. Audiences polled by CinemaScore gave the film an average grade of "B" on an A+ to F scale.
