= Gifted (2017 film) =

2017 American drama film

- Theatrical release poster
- Directed by: Marc Webb
- Written by: Tom Flynn
- Produced by: Karen Lunder; Andy Cohen
- Starring: Chris Evans; Mckenna Grace; Lindsay Duncan; Jenny Slate; Octavia Spencer
- Cinematography: Stuart Dryburgh
- Edited by: Bill Pankow
- Music by: Rob Simonsen
- Production companies: FilmNation Entertainment; Grade A Entertainment; DayDay Films
- Distributed by: Fox Searchlight Pictures
- Release date: April 7, 2017 (United States)
- Running time: 101 minutes
- Country: United States
- Language: English
- Budget: $7 million
- Box office: $43 million

Gifted is a 2017 American comedy drama film directed by Marc Webb and written by Tom Flynn. It stars Chris Evans, Mckenna Grace, Lindsay Duncan, Jenny Slate and Octavia Spencer.

The plot follows an intellectually gifted seven-year-old who becomes the subject of a custody battle between her maternal uncle and maternal grandmother.

The film was released on April 7, 2017, by Fox Searchlight Pictures, and grossed $43 million worldwide. At the 23rd Critics' Choice Awards, Grace was nominated for Best Young Actor/Actress. The film received positive reviews from critics, who praised the performances of Evans and Grace, but noted its predictability.

== Plot ==
In St. Petersburg, Florida, seven-year-old Mary Adler, a mathematical genius, lives with her uncle and de facto guardian, Frank. Her best friend is her 43-year-old neighbor, Roberta Taylor. Frank, a former philosophy professor and now boat mechanic, feels strongly that Mary should attend a normal elementary school so she can have a normal childhood.

In first grade, Mary shows remarkable mathematical talent, which impresses her teacher, Ms. Stevenson. It emerges that Mary's mother, Diane, had been a promising mathematician, dedicated to the Navier–Stokes problem (then, one of the unsolved Millennium Prize Problems) before taking her own life when Mary was six months old. Mary has lived with Frank ever since.

Despite Mary's initial disdain for average children her own age, and her boredom with their classwork, she begins to bond with them when she brings her one-eyed cat, Fred, for show-and-tell. Later, she defends a classmate from a bully on the school bus. The principal, having discovered Mary's math talent, encourages Frank to send Mary to a private school for gifted children, offering the opportunity of a scholarship. Frank turns it down, based on his family's experiences with similar schools.

The principal contacts Frank's estranged mother and Mary's maternal grandmother, Evelyn. Evelyn, a former mathematician herself, believes that people with capabilities such as Mary's have an obligation to use their talents to help further society, and feels that Mary should be specially tutored in preparation for a life devoted to mathematics, as Diane was. But Frank is adamant that his sister would want Mary to be in a normal school and have the childhood she did not have.

Evelyn sues Frank for full custody. While she is on the stand in court, it is revealed that not only did Evelyn homeschool Diane, she kept her socially isolated, so that she could be completely focused on mathematics. When Diane and her teenage boyfriend ran away to a ski resort, Evelyn pressed kidnapping charges and filed a lawsuit against his parents until he cut ties with Diane. Diane attempted suicide for the first time shortly after, something Evelyn argues was an isolated incident. When Frank takes the stand, he admits working at a low-paying job without health insurance. His lawyer, worried that the judge will side with Evelyn due to her financial resources, convinces Frank to take a deal orchestrated by Evelyn's lawyer.

Mary is placed in foster care, where she can attend the private school. Evelyn waits until her 12th birthday, when she will be able to decide where she wants to live. The foster parents live near Frank, and he is entitled to scheduled visits. Mary is devastated and refuses to see Frank when he tries to visit. Thanks to a tip from Ms. Stevenson, Frank rescues Fred from the pound moments before he is about to be put down. Frank realizes that Evelyn, who is allergic to cats, is overseeing Mary's education in the guest house of the foster home.

Frank goes to the foster home and reconciles with Mary. He informs Evelyn that Diane had completed the Navier–Stokes problem, but left instructions for Frank not to publish the solution until after Evelyn's death, revealing Diane's deep resentment towards her mother. Frank offers Evelyn the opportunity to publish Diane's work if she drops her custody case, to which she reluctantly agrees. Mary is placed back in Frank's custody, living a normal public-school childhood while taking college-level courses in her spare time. Frank is also implied to have returned to his philosophy roots.

== Cast ==
- Chris Evans as Francis "Frank" Adler
- Mckenna Grace as Mary Adler, the gifted niece of Frank
- Lindsay Duncan as Evelyn Adler, Mary's maternal grandmother, Frank's mother
- Jenny Slate as Bonnie Stevenson, Mary's teacher
- Octavia Spencer as Roberta Taylor, Mary and Frank's neighbor
- Michael Kendall Kaplan as Justin Gilmore, Mary's classmate
- Glenn Plummer as Greg Cullen, Frank's attorney
- John Finn as Aubrey Highsmith, lawyer for Evelyn Adler in the case for custody of Mary
- Elizabeth Marvel as Gloria Davis, the school principal and Bonnie's boss
- Jon Sklaroff as Seymour Shankland, the head of MIT's math department
- Jona Xiao as Lijuan, a background character in the university scene who critiques the professor's equation
- Julie Ann Emery as Pat Golding
- Keir O'Donnell as Bradley Pollard, Mary's biological father
- John M. Jackson as Edward Nichols, the judge of Mary's custody trial
- Jordan Ellenberg as Professor, whose course Mary attends at the end of the film

== Production ==
In December 2014, Tom Flynn's screenplay was one of the 70 to make that year's Black List. In August 2015, it was announced Chris Evans had been cast in the film, with Marc Webb directing. In September 2015, Mckenna Grace, Octavia Spencer, Lindsay Duncan and Jenny Slate joined the cast, and in November 2015, Julie Ann Emery was also added.

Filming began in October 2015 in Savannah, Georgia, as well as in Tybee Island, Georgia, and finished in November 2015. Specific locations included May Howard Elementary School in Wilmington Island, Georgia and Emory University in Atlanta.

Although the film is set in St. Petersburg, Florida, Flynn was unable to convince the producers to film in Florida, because the state was no longer providing financial incentives to movie makers; that made Georgia a more financially viable option.

Mathematician Jordan Ellenberg, who was himself a child prodigy, was a mathematics consultant for the film; Webb contacted him after reading his article in The Wall Street Journal and asked him to share his experiences. Ellenberg also cameos as a professor lecturing on the partition function and Ramanujan's congruences.

== Release ==
The film was scheduled to be released on April 12, 2017, but was pushed up to April 7, 2017.

== Reception ==
=== Box office ===
Gifted grossed $24.8 million domestically (United States and Canada), and $18.3 million in other territories, for a worldwide total of $43.1 million, against a budget of $7 million. It had a very limited release (56 screens) its first weekend, finishing No. 16 at the domestic box office, then expanded into wide release, spending the next four weekends in the Top 10.

=== Critical response ===
On the review aggregator website Rotten Tomatoes, 73% of 181 critics' reviews are positive, with an average rating of 6.4/10. The website's consensus reads: "Gifted isn't quite as bright as its pint-sized protagonist, but a charming cast wrings respectably engaging drama out of a fairly predictable premise." Metacritic, which uses a weighted average, assigned the film a score of 60 out of 100, based on 33 critics, indicating "mixed or average" reviews. Audiences polled by CinemaScore gave the film an average grade of "A" on an A+ to F scale.

Colin Covert of the Star Tribune gave the film 3 out of 4 stars, saying, "Sure, it's a simple, straightforward film, but sometimes that's all you need as long as its heart is true." On Evans' performance, Owen Gleiberman of Variety said, "Chris Evans, abashed and rumpled, with a grease monkey's can't-be-bothered-to-shave beard, gives an engaged performance, exuding a homespun warmth we haven't seen in the "Captain America" films." Richard Roeper gave the film 4 out of 4 stars and said, "Gifted isn't the best or most sophisticated or most original film of the year so far – but it just might be my favorite."

=== Accolades ===
Award	Date of ceremony	Category	Recipient(s)	Result	Ref.
Teen Choice Awards	August 13, 2017	Choice Movie: Drama	Gifted	Nominated	
Teen Choice Awards	August 13, 2017	Choice Movie Actor: Drama	Chris Evans	Nominated	
Deauville American Film Festival	September 1, 2017	Public's choice award	Gifted	Won	
Phoenix Film Critics Society Awards	December 17, 2017	Breakthrough Performance	Mckenna Grace	Won	
Phoenix Film Critics Society Awards	December 17, 2017	Best Performance by a Youth	Mckenna Grace	Won	
Phoenix Film Critics Society Awards	December 17, 2017	The Overlooked Film of the Year	Gifted	Won	
Women Film Critics Circle Awards	December 17, 2017	Best Young Actress	Mckenna Grace	Nominated	
Critics' Choice Movie Awards	January 11, 2018	Best Young Actor/Actress	Mckenna Grace	Nominated	
NAACP Image Awards	January 15, 2018	Outstanding Actress in a Motion Picture	Octavia Spencer	Won	

== See also ==
- Proof, about a complex proof written by a mathematician or his daughter
- Little Man Tate, similar theme of prodigy and reluctance of the single parent to accept their need for better education
- List of films about mathematicians
- List of fictional child prodigies
