= What We Hide =

2025 drama film

- Directed by: Dan Kay
- Written by: Dan Kay
- Produced by: Jeff Hoffman; Yaniv Hoffman; Dan Kay; Joseph Restaino; Dan Sima; Tony Stopperan
- Starring: Mckenna Grace; Jojo Regina; Forrest Goodluck; Malia Baker; Dacre Montgomery; Jesse Williams
- Cinematography: Pip White
- Edited by: JC Bond
- Music by: Alexis Grapsas
- Production companies: Hungry Bull Productions; Above the Clouds; Beautiful Ghosts Productions; Provoke Productions; WinniePeg Productions
- Distributed by: Gravitas Ventures
- Release dates: February 2025 (Santa Barbara); August 8, 2025 (United States)
- Running time: 103 minutes
- Country: United States
- Language: English

What We Hide is a 2025 American drama film directed and written by Dan Kay. It stars Mckenna Grace and Jojo Regina as sisters who hide their mother's body following a fatal overdose. Forrest Goodluck, Malia Baker, Dacre Montgomery and Jesse Williams appear in supporting roles. It has received generally positive reviews.

== Plot ==
After their mother dies from an overdose, sisters Spider and Jessie, hide her body out of a fear that they will be separated by the foster care system.

== Cast ==
- Mckenna Grace as Sadie “Spider” Zweydorf
- Jojo Regina as Jessie
- Jesse Williams as Sheriff Ben Jeffries
- Dacre Montgomery as Reece
- Forrest Goodluck as Cody
- Malia Baker as Alexis

== Production ==
The film was announced by Deadline Hollywood in October 2022. It was filmed in Hillsborough and Pinellas counties in Florida, United States, between 2022 and 2023 at Seminole High School and Bauder Elementary School. Hurricane Ian halted filming for six days.

== Release ==
The film had its world premiere debut under the title Spider & Jessie in February 2025 at the Santa Barbara International Film Festival. It was released under the title What We Hide in select theaters on August 8, 2025, and became available on digital and video on demand on August 29.

== Reception ==
On the review aggregator website Rotten Tomatoes, 80% of 10 critics' reviews are positive. Monica Castillo of RogerEbert.com unfavourably compared What We Hide to the coming-of-age drama film Winter's Bone (2010), saying it "simply does not carry that suspense or tension". She wrote that the film "has the feeling of an old after-school special, a melodramatic lesson about a topical issue".
