= Jan Broberg =

American actress, singer, and dancer

- Occupations: Actress; singer; dancer
- Years active: 1992–present
- Known for: Two-time kidnapping victim
- Notable work: Stolen Innocence: The Jan Broberg Story; Everwood
- Spouse: Larry Felt
- Children: 1

Jan Broberg Felt is an American actress, singer, dancer, and kidnapping survivor.

As a child, Broberg was kidnapped on two occasions by a family friend, at ages 12 and 14. The experience has been documented in her mother Mary Ann Broberg's book, Stolen Innocence: The Jan Broberg Story, the documentary Abducted in Plain Sight, and the drama miniseries A Friend of the Family.

== Career ==
Broberg has appeared in over a dozen feature films. Some of her film credits are Slaughter of the Innocents (HBO), The Poof Point (Disney), Message in a Cell Phone (Disney), The Secret Keeper (Columbia TriStar), Bug Off, Hope For Troubled Teens, Nadir, Family First, Little Secrets (Columbia TriStar), Mobsters and Mormons, and The Book of Mormon Movie, Vol. 1: The Journey. She also played the mother of the main character in Baptists at Our Barbecue, and co-starred with Elijah Wood in Maniac.

Broberg has appeared in many television series, including: Touched by an Angel (CBS), Promised Land (CBS), Remember Me (PBS), Death Row (PBS), The Man With Three Wives (the Norman Grayson story), Harmful Intent (NBC), Siege at Marion (NBC), Deliver Them from Evil: The Taking of Alta View (CBS), Ancient Secrets of the Bible (CBS Miniseries). Perhaps her most notable role was in the WB series Everwood as Nurse Louise.

Broberg has had stage roles in the following: The Sound of Music (Tuacahn Theatre), I Do! I Do! (Sundance Theatre), Jane Eyre (Glendale Center), My Fair Lady (Scera Theatre), Carousel (Idaho State University), Trixie True, Teen Detective (BYU), No No Nanette (Playmill), and appeared with and directed for St. George Musical Theater.

In 2017, Broberg was executive director for the Kayenta Arts Foundation and Center for the Arts at Kayenta in Ivins, Utah.

Broberg helped produce A Friend of the Family, a Peacock drama TV series about her life.

== Personal life ==
Broberg was kidnapped when she was twelve, and again when she was fourteen, both times by Robert Berchtold, a friend of the family, who had sexual encounters with both of her parents. During the first kidnapping, he groomed her by convincing her that they had been abducted by aliens, and that she had to have sex with him to conceive a child. When the FBI found Broberg, she did not disclose the sexual abuse to anyone, fearing that the aliens would harm her family. Berchtold continued to sexually abuse Broberg between 1972 and 1976, and in 1986 he was convicted for rape of a child against another child. On October 30, 2003, she and her mother Mary Ann published a book titled Stolen Innocence: The Jan Broberg Story which completely omitted her father's sexual involvement with the perpetrator. Broberg's story was the feature of the true crime documentary Abducted in Plain Sight. Filmed and produced over a three-year period, it was released in January 2019. Robert Berchtold committed suicide in 2005 following news that another prosecution for his crimes was imminent.

Broberg has a son from a previous marriage.

== Recognition ==
In 2008, in St. George, Utah, the Local Chapter of National Federation of Business and Professional Women's Clubs recognized, as the 2008 Women of Achievement, ten women, including Broberg.

In 2017, Broberg spoke to the St. George Area Chamber of Commerce Chamber inspiration luncheon, and the Hurricane Valley Chamber of Commerce luncheon.

== Filmography ==
Year	Title	Role	Notes
2022	A Friend of the Family	Jan's psychologist	Mini series; also producer
2022	The Gabby Petito Story	Attorney	TV movie
2020	Holly & Ivy	Librarian	TV movie
2020	Behind You	Beth	Movie
2019	Check Inn to Christmas	Evelyn Mason	TV movie
2019	The Road Home for Christmas	Maggie	TV movie
2019	Love, Fall & Order	Margie Wright	TV movie
2017–2019	I'm Sorry	Bonnie	3 episodes
2018	Dick Dickster	Coco Hart	Movie
2018	Chasing Bullit	Julian	Movie
2017	Abducted in Plain Sight	Self	Documentary
2015	We Are Your Friends	Sandra	Movie
2015	i-Lived	Josh's Mom	Movie
2015	More Than Words	Allison Murphy	Short
2015	Alone in the Dust	Sarah	Short
2015	They Want Dick Dickster	Coco Hart	Movie
2015	Sangre Negra	Judge Blake	1 episode
2014	Happy Medium	Mother	Short
2014	At the Devil's Door	Royanna	Movie
2014	The Swan Princess: A Royal Family Tale	Uberta (singing voice)	Direct-to-DVD
2014	Haunt	Meredith Tanner	Movie
2013	Criminal Minds	Lauren Morrison	1 episode
2013	The Flipside (TV Series short)		1 episode
2013	Coyote	Mrs. Herlihy	
2013	Iron Man 3	Senior Technician	Movie
2013	My Only Son	Rhonda Porter	Short
2012	Dreamcatchers	Vida	Short
2012	Maniac	Rita	Movie
2012	40 (TV series)	Charlotte Pefferele	
2012	Darling Companion	Hysterical Wife	Movie
2009	Reality Hell	Jan Bloom	1 episode
2007	Passage to Zarahemla	Aunt Corrine	Movie
2002–2006	Everwood	Nurse Louise	32 episodes
2005	Mobsters and Mormons	Louise Means	Movie
2004	Baptists at Our Barbecue	Tartan's Mom	Movie
2004	Paradise	Rachel Dove	TV movie
2003	The Book of Mormon Movie, Volume 1: The Journey	Sariah	Movie
2003	Clubhouse Detectives in Scavenger Hunt	Elaine	Movie
2002	Clubhouse Detectives in Big Trouble	Elaine	Movie
2002	Clubhouse Detectives in Search of a Lost Princess	Elaine	Movie
2001	Little Secrets	Caroline Lindstrom	Movie
2001	The Poof Point	Corky	Disney Channel Original Movie
2001	Bug Off!	Mom	Movie
2001	Cover Me: Based on the True Life of an FBI Family	Hannah Marston	1 episode
2000	Message in a Cell Phone	Jess	Movie
1999	Touched by an Angel	Reporter	1 episode
1996	Nadir	Connie	Movie
1993	The ButterCream Gang in Secret of Treasure Mountain	Minnie	Direct-to-Video
1993	Harmful Intent	Shelia	TV movie
1993	Slaughter of the Innocents	Cindy Lockerby	Movie
1993	The Man with Three Wives	Mother	TV movie
1992	Deliver Them from Evil: The Taking of Alta View		TV movie
1992	In the Line of Duty: Siege at Marion	Heidi Swapp	TV movie

== See also ==
- List of kidnappings
- List of solved missing person cases
