= Tadashi Hamada =

- Big Hero 6 character
- First appearance: Big Hero 6 (2014)
- Created by: Don Hall; Jordan Roberts; Robert L. Baird; Dan Gerson
- Voiced by: Daniel Henney

In-universe information
- Family: Unnamed parents (deceased); Hiro Hamada (younger brother)
- Relatives: Cass (aunt)
- Home: San Fransokyo

Tadashi Hamada is a fictional character who appears in Walt Disney Animation Studios' animated film Big Hero 6, which was loosely based on Marvel Comics' superhero team of the same name. Portrayed by Daniel Henney, Tadashi is ethnically Japanese. In the film, Tadashi, a student at the San Fransokyo Institute of Technology, is the creator of Baymax and the elder brother of Hiro Hamada. Baymax, as described in the film, is a personal health care companion.

== Appearances ==
=== Big Hero 6 (2014) ===
Tadashi appears in Big Hero 6 as Hiro Hamada's elder brother. Due to their parents being deceased, Tadashi is Hiro's primary voice of reason and father figure. In the film, Tadashi and Hiro live in San Fransokyo with their aunt Cass. Although his age is not explicitly described in the film, Tadashi acts very mature for his age. Additionally, Henney describes the character as "pure", even comparing Tadashi to an angel. Tadashi is also a "tech-wizard" who attends the San Fransokyo Institute of Technology, where he conceives, builds and programs Baymax.

"Tadashi is a good guy. He just is. He actually developed, built and programmed a state-of-the-art nursebot—a Healthcare Companion named Baymax that will likely help millions worldwide. But it's his role as big brother that makes Tadashi truly special. Every kid needs a guy like Tadashi looking out for him, and Hiro knows just how lucky he is to have him in his life."

— Official Disney blog release (2014).

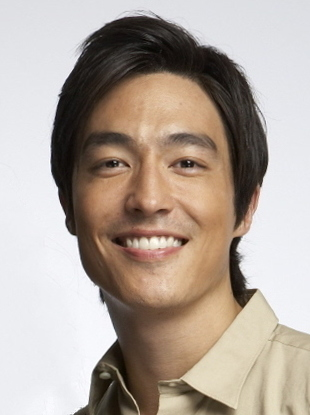
Daniel Henney, voice of Tadashi

In the film, Tadashi suggests that Hiro should attend the San Fransokyo Institute of Technology as Hiro is also gifted in robotics and engineering, even more so than Tadashi, his intellect allowing him to graduate from high school at 13. Initially, Hiro dismisses the request, as he chooses to pursue monetary gain from his domination in illegal bot fights in San Fransokyo, even in spite of any risks. Tadashi responds to this by redirecting his little brother's intelligence, taking Hiro with him on a quick trip to his college. From it, Hiro sees just how remarkable the institution really is, and is introduced to Tadashi's friends—Honey Lemon, GoGo, Wasabi, and Fred. Tadashi also introduces Hiro to his project Baymax, a personal healthcare robot. Tadashi designs Baymax to have a huggable build. The film's animation team researched at Carnegie Mellon University to help conceive Baymax's design. Directors Don Hall and Chris Williams wanted Baymax to be "appealing but also huggable." Ryan Potter (Hiro's voice actor) states that Hiro sees Baymax as a representation of Tadashi. The experience inspires Hiro to want to attend the school himself, and, with a small amount of help from Tadashi, he begins working on his own endeavor in order to gain admission. Hiro showcases his project, Microbots, controlled by a neurological headband and highly versatile, at a student exhibition held at the school. Shortly after being accepted by Robert Callaghan, the institute's professor, the exhibition hall catches fire. With Professor Callaghan still inside, Tadashi runs into the burning building in an effort to save him. Moments later, the building explodes, killing Tadashi and, as everyone else assumes, Callaghan. Hiro, Baymax, and Tadashi's school friends mourn Tadashi throughout the rest of the film, while most of his legacy remains present in the form of Baymax. Following Tadashi's death, Baymax ends up taking over the role of being Hiro's emotional support. A series of further events leads to the formation of a group who helps Hiro investigate Tadashi's death and the criminal plot that surrounds it: this same group would go on to honor Tadashi's wisdom and dedication of helping people, through becoming the superhero team that would call themselves Big Hero 6. Prior to the film's climax, Baymax shows video footage of his testing by Tadashi to Hiro, revealing it took Tadashi several dozen attempts to perfect Baymax's original programming, body, and their compatibility with each other. Portions of these tests are seen in the second official US trailer of the film.

=== Big Hero 6: The Series ===
Tadashi has sporadic appearances during seasons one and two of Big Hero 6: The Series, with Henney reprising the role. He briefly appears as a recording in "Baymax Returns". It is revealed that he taught Hiro how to ride a bike. He also appears in "Obake Yashiki" where he appears as an illusion created by an augmented reality that made Hiro believe that Tadashi is alive. The series gives more insight into how he created Baymax. "Failure Mode" revealed that he nearly gave up on completing Baymax, and "City of Monsters – Part I" revealed he needed the medical expert Lily in order to properly program Baymax. In "Legacies", Hiro accepts Tadashi's diploma on his behalf at graduation.

=== Printed media ===
Tadashi appears in the prequel manga, Baymax, which was released prior to the film's release, in August 2014. Unlike other Disney properties that received a one-shot manga, Baymax is a full manga story which had the goal of previewing the film's story. Tadashi also appears in other Disney books, such as The Art of Big Hero 6, and Big Hero 6: Hiro and Tadashi.

== Reception ==
A review by Manohla Dargis of The New York Times describes that Tadashi "isn't much better" than the "disappointingly bland maternal creation," Aunt Cass. In her review, Dargis states that this is despite Tadashi being a "hunky brainiac who studies at an institute of higher nerdiness alongside a Scooby Doo-like posse." The Japan Times describes that Tadashi "fits the normal Hollywood bill of a polite young Japanese male". At one point in his review, Sam Adams of Indiewire's "Criticwire" blog, writes that Tadashi has a "nurturing spirit". Adams also criticizes Tadashi's death, calling it "underplayed and unseen". After mentioning another blogger's interpretation of why Hiro didn't want to lose Baymax, Adams writes that, "Even in retrospect, Tadashi's death isn't rendered significant."
