= Daniel Hsia =

American film director

Daniel Hsia is a filmmaker, director, screenwriter and producer. He is most known for his first feature, Shanghai Calling which stars Daniel Henney, Eliza Coupe and Bill Paxton, and which Hsia won a Best Screenwriter Award for from the 2012 Shanghai International Film Festival and a Best New Director / Outstanding First Feature award from the 2012 Los Angeles Asian Pacific Film Festival.

== Films ==
Hsia's first feature, the drama/comedy Shanghai Calling (2012) is about an ambitious New York Attorney named Sam Chao (played by Daniel Henney) who is sent to Shanghai, China on assignment for a case and gets mixed up in a dilemma that puts his career in jeopardy. The film also stars Eliza Coupe (as Henney's love interest, Amanda Wilson, a relocation specialist), Bill Paxton as a fast food entrepreneur named Donald Cafferty and Alan Ruck as Marcus Groff, a client of Chao's law firm. The film won a Best Actor award (for Daniel Henney) at the 2012 Shanghai International Film Festival), and Best Screenwriter (for Hsia) at the 2012 Shanghai International Film Festival as well. Daniel Henney also won a Best Actor award at the 2012 Newport Beach Film Festival, and Hsia also won a Best New Director / Outstanding First Feature Award at the 2012 Los Angeles Asian Pacific Film Festival.

Hsia has also directed the short films How to Do the Asian Squat (2002), Generation Gap (2004) and I Hate Cheese (2003) - which was done as a Visual Communications "Armed with a Camera" Fellowship film in 2003.

== TV writing ==
Hsia has also written various episodes for the USA Network TV series Psych, Andy Barker, P.I., the canceled NBC comedy Four Kings, and Rodney. Hsia has also sold original pilot screenplays to Sony Pictures Television, ABC and USA Networks.

== Background ==
Hsia is a graduate of Stanford University and the University of Southern California's graduate program in film production. He currently lives in Los Angeles.
