= Long Weekend (2021 film) =

2021 drama film

- Theatrical release poster
- Directed by: Steve Basilone
- Written by: Steve Basilone
- Produced by: Deanna Barillari; Theodora Dunlap; Jess Jacobs; Laura Lewis; Audrey Rosenberg; Sam Bisbee
- Starring: Finn Wittrock; Zoë Chao; Casey Wilson; Jim Rash; Damon Wayans Jr.
- Cinematography: Felipe Vara de Rey
- Edited by: Libby Cuenin; Stephanie Kaznocha
- Music by: Lauren Culjak
- Production companies: Fifty Seventh Productions; Rebelle Media
- Distributed by: Stage 6 Films
- Release date: March 12, 2021
- Running time: 91 minutes
- Country: United States
- Language: English
- Budget: $500,000
- Box office: $1 million

Long Weekend is a 2021 American romantic comedy drama film written and directed by Steve Basilone, starring Finn Wittrock, Zoë Chao, Damon Wayans Jr., Casey Wilson, Wendi McLendon-Covey, and Jim Rash. It tells the story of a struggling writer named Bart (Wittrock) who meets Vienna (Chao), an enigmatic woman who enters his life at just the right time.

The film was released in theaters on March 12, 2021. It was well received by critics, who praised Wittrock and Chao's performances as well as the film's "unexpected twist." As of July 2021, the movie has grossed over $1 million in the United States.

== Plot ==
Bart is down on his luck and has to take a job writing product descriptions for a medical-supply company. He moves into the garage of his best friend, Doug, and his wife, Rachel, and their two kids. He is broke and depressed; his novel failed to make any money, his fiancée broke up with him, and he's ignoring his psychiatrist's phone calls.

He gets drunk and falls asleep in a movie theater. A girl named Vienna wakes him, telling him the movie is over. They start talking and hit it off, going on a date at a bar and then having sex in Vienna's motel room. Bart learns that her mother has cancer. His own mother died from it years earlier, and he was inspired to write his novel after she grew more concerned about his happiness in her last few months. After she died, Bart had a mental breakdown.

As Bart and Vienna spend more time together, she continues to be vague about her circumstances. She has no phone, and carries large amounts of cash. When Bart asks her to tell him more about herself, she either changes the subject or gives vague answers, such as she works for the government.

Bart's old apartment is in the process of being sold and the new tenants are moving in, but they go there to talk in private. She finally tells Bart that she is from the future, working for a secret government branch that has discovered time travel in 2052. She says she has gone back in time to buy stocks that will earn enough to pay for her mom's cancer treatment.

Bart tells Doug the next day, who advises him to get Vienna help, just as Doug helped Bart after his own mental breakdown. Bart and Vienna become even more attached, growing to trust each other enough to open a safe deposit box together where Vienna keeps her stocks.

They spend a night camping in the desert, and Bart wakes up to Vienna down the road, crying. She later tells him that staying in the past too long changes one's brain chemistry, and that she must soon return. As they have an at-home pasta dinner date later on, she starts moaning in pain and finds it hard to breathe. Bart gets scared and heeds Doug's advice by taking her to the hospital for assessment the next day. As she's about to walk to the doctor's office, Bart has a nosebleed and faints.

He wakes up in a hospital bed with bandages on his head and Doug by his side, who explains to him that he had a brain tumor, but the doctors were able to remove it. Bart asks Doug where Vienna is, and Doug tells him that because of how the tumor affected his brain, he imagined Vienna—she was never real. Acknowledging this, Bart breaks down in tears, and Doug tries to comfort him.

Having accepted that Vienna was an illusion, Bart finally moves out of his old apartment. However, when he goes to withdraw cash from an ATM, he discovers that someone has deposited over $89,000 into his account. He then remembers the safe deposit box he and Vienna opened together. When he checks it, he finds photos that he and Vienna took in a photobooth, proving that she was real. On the back of the photos is a message from her, along with a little hint about the future of his favorite sports team. He smiles and laughs ecstatically.

== Cast ==
- Finn Wittrock as Bart
- Zoë Chao as Vienna
- Damon Wayans Jr. as Doug
- Casey Wilson as Rachel
- Wendi McLendon-Covey as Patricia
- Jim Rash as Larry
- Carter Morgan as Teddy

== Production ==
In September 2019, Finn Wittrock, Zoë Chao, Damon Wayans Jr., Casey Wilson, Wendi McLendon-Covey, and Jim Rash joined the cast, with Steven Basilone directing from a screenplay he wrote in 2017. Principal photography took place for a month and wrapped on August 23, 2019.

== Release ==
In February 2021, Stage 6 Films acquired distribution rights to the film, and set it for a March 12, 2021, release.

== Box office ==
In its first weekend the film made $245,182.

== Reception ==
On review aggregator website Rotten Tomatoes, the film holds an approval rating of 67% based on 42 reviews, with an average rating of 6.50/10. The site's critics consensus reads: "A seemingly traditional rom-com distinguished by an unexpected twist, Long Weekend benefits from stars who make a great screen couple." On Metacritic, the film has a weighted average score of 53 out of 100, based on 11 critics, indicating "mixed or average" reviews. According to PostTrak, 55% of audience members gave the film a positive score, with 32% saying they would definitely recommend it.
