= My Father =

- Poster for My Father (2007)
- Hangul: 마이 파더
- RR: Mai padeo
- MR: Mai p'adŏ
- Directed by: Hwang Dong-hyuk
- Written by: Hwang Dong-hyuk
- Produced by: Seok Myeong-hong; Choe Yun
- Starring: Kim Yeong-cheol; Daniel Henney
- Cinematography: Choe Hyeon-gi
- Edited by: Lee Sang-min; Hahm Sung-won
- Music by: Gang Ho-jeong
- Distributed by: Cineline II Co. Ltd.
- Release date: September 6, 2007 (South Korea)
- Running time: 109 minutes
- Country: South Korea
- Languages: Korean; English
- Box office: US$6.1 million

My Father (Korean: 마이 파더) is a 2007 South Korean drama film directed and written by Hwang Dong-hyuk. The film, which is based on a true story, is about an adopted son who is searching for his biological parents in South Korea. During his search he meets his real father, a condemned murderer on death row. Daniel Henney plays the lead role of James, who works as an army captain in the United States Forces Korea. He asks questions of why his father is on death row and finds out things that he always wanted to know. Then he finds more and more truths unravel about his father and his life.

The release of the film inspired controversy because the family of the father's victims did not support its production. In its first week on release it topped the South Korean box office sales charts.

The adopted son on whom the story is based is Aaron Bates, an insurance broker who lives and works in Arizona with his wife and two sons. In real life, a DNA test confirmed that the man he met on death row was not his biological father.

== Cast ==
- Kim Yeong-cheol as Hwang Nam-cheol
- Daniel Henney as James Parker
- Ahn Suk-hwan as Jang Min-ho
- Richard Riehle as John Parker
- Ilene Graff as Nancy Parker
- Kim In-kwon as Shin Yo-seob
- Choi Jong-ryul as Moon Shin-bu
- Jeon Guk-hwan as Kim
- Lee Sang-hee as Park
- Son Jin-hwan as Thief
- Bae Ho-geun as Hyeon-shik
- Bak Gyeong-geun as Haeng Sang-nam
- Lee Geum-hee as Narrator
