= Wasabi-No-Ginger =

- Wasabi-No-Ginger by David Nakayama

Publication information
- Publisher: Marvel Comics
- First appearance: Big Hero 6 #1 (Sept. 2008)
- Created by: Chris Claremont and David Nakayama

In-story information
- Species: Human
- Team affiliations: Big Hero 6
- Abilities: Skilled marksman and swordsman Ability to generate qi-energy blades

Wasabi-No-Ginger is a fictional superhero appearing in American comic books published by Marvel Comics. Created by writer Chris Claremont and artist David Nakayama, he first appeared in Big Hero 6 #1 (September 2008), a book about a titular superhero team in which Wasabi is a member.

Wasabi appears in the 2014 Disney animated film Big Hero 6 voiced by Damon Wayans Jr., with Khary Payton taking over in the television series and the video game Kingdom Hearts III. This version of him is portrayed as African-American and is highly intelligent but neurotic. His main weapons are the plasma blades that he has developed as part of his school project.

== Publication history ==
The character was created by Chris Claremont and David Nakayama and first appeared in Big Hero 6 #1 (September 2008). He along with Fredzilla were meant to serve as replacements for Sunpyre and Ebon Samurai.

== Fictional character biography ==
Wasabi-No-Ginger is a trained chef and a member of Big Hero 6. His first mission with the six was taking on a villain named Badgal and her three minions; Whiplash, Brute, and Gunsmith. He is once again with his teammates, this time helping Spider-Man take out Doctor Octopus' satellites. Wasabi and Baymax jump head on into battle, taking on Everwraith.

== Powers and abilities ==
Wasabi-No-Ginger uses various swords to fight. He can also give form to his Qi-Energy, usually materializing it as throwing knives that can paralyze opponents.

== Reception ==
- In 2020, CBR.com ranked Wasabi-No-Ginger 10th in their "Marvel Comics: Ranking Every Member Of Big Hero 6 From Weakest To Most Powerful" list.

== In other media ==
=== Disney version ===
Wasabi
- Big Hero 6 character
- Walt Disney Animation Studios re-imagining of Wasabi
- First appearance: Big Hero 6 (2014)
- Created by: Don Hall; Chris Williams
- Adapted by: Jordan Roberts; Robert L. Baird; Daniel Gerson
- Voiced by: Damon Wayans Jr. (film); Khary Payton (TV series, Kingdom Hearts III)
- Age: 21

In-universe information
- Nickname: Chop Chop (by Karmi)
- Gender: Male

==== Film ====
Wasabi-No-Ginger, renamed as just Wasabi, appears in the 2014 animated film Big Hero 6, voiced by Damon Wayans Jr. This version is an African-American student at the San Fransokyo Institute of Technology who specializes in laser cutting and wields plasma blades. Co-director Chris Williams stated "He's actually the most conservative, cautious—he [sic] the most normal among a group of brazen characters. So he really grounds the movie in the second act and becomes, in a way, the voice of the audience and points out that what they're doing is crazy."

Wasabi appears in the spin-off series Big Hero 6: The Series, voiced by Khary Payton.

==== Video games ====
- Wasabi appears as an unlockable playable character in Disney Magic Kingdoms.
- Wasabi appears as a playable character in the mobile game Disney Heroes: Battle Mode.
- Wasabi appears in Kingdom Hearts III, voiced again by Khary Payton in the English version and by Koji Takeda in Japanese.

==== Other appearances ====
Wasabi makes a cameo appearance in Once Upon a Studio.
