= Raid the Cage (American game show) =

American television game show

- Genre: Game show
- Based on: An original format created by Shy Barmeli, Tal Berman and United Studios of Israel Ltd.
- Directed by: Edgar Peña (Camera Director)
- Presented by: Damon Wayans Jr.; Jeannie Mai
- Theme music composer: Bleeding Fingers Music
- Country of origin: United States
- Original language: English
- No. of seasons: 2
- No. of episodes: 24

Production
- Executive producers: Jack Martin; Damon Wayans Jr.; Ves D'Elia; Wes Kauble
- Producer: Federico Friciello
- Production location: Azteca Studios
- Editors: Clark Burnett; Kurk Heydle
- Running time: 43 minutes
- Production companies: Two Shakes Entertainment; United Studios Israel; Sony Pictures Television

Original release
- Network: CBS
- Release: October 13, 2023 – June 25, 2025

Related
- Raid the Cage

Raid the Cage is an American television game show hosted by Damon Wayans Jr. and Jeannie Mai that premiered on CBS on October 13, 2023. It is an adaptation of the Israeli television series of the same name. Two teams of two contestants compete on each episode to earn time to retrieve prizes from a giant cage, with the team having the highest total keeping the prizes and playing the bonus round.

== Gameplay ==
=== Main game ===
A backstage coin toss determines which team starts the first round; that team chooses one of two categories. One team member (the "Gabber") is given 45 seconds to match ten clues with eleven answers in a category. Each correct answer earns three seconds (for a maximum of 30 seconds) for their teammate (the "Grabber") to enter the cage.

The Grabber then enters the cage, and attempts to collect as many prizes (consisting of physical goods, "tokens" for larger or non-tangible prizes, and mystery gift boxes) as they can and remove them from the cage before time runs out; a Grabber can only select one mystery box. If the Grabber does not escape before time runs out and the doors close, the prizes are lost; however, as stated in the season 2 opening credits, as long as they get any part of their body past the doors, any prizes they are touching count. Grabbers do not receive any indication of their time remaining, besides a three-second warning before the door closes. Grabbers cannot re-enter the cage if time remains, and any prizes they grab after any part of their body leaves the cage do not count. Starting in season 2, a marked "no stacking zone" has been added adjacent to the entrance where Grabbers are prohibited from intentionally leaving items they wish to remove from the cage. A violation of that rule, the prizes left in the no stacking zone are forfeited.

After their run, the total value of any prizes successfully retrieved is revealed. The second team then repeats the process with the remaining category.

This process repeats in rounds two and three with the leading team starting each round. In round two, the time increases to five seconds per correct answer (50 maximum), and the teammates must switch roles. In round three, teammates can choose roles, and each correct answer earns seven seconds (70 maximum). New prizes are added to the cage between rounds, with certain higher-valued prizes requiring the contestant to complete a physical challenge in order to claim them.

The team that has the highest total value of prizes after three rounds wins the game and advances to the "Beat the Cage" bonus round. The winning team keeps all prizes won in the main game, while the losing team leaves with nothing.

=== Bonus Round: Beat the Cage ===
The winning team then plays a final 90-second run in the cage to collect more prizes, which includes major prizes locked behind physical challenges. Unlike the main game, the two contestants take turns in the cage, and can continue to re-enter as long as there is time remaining. The team will not know how much time is left in the raid until five seconds remain.

If the team retrieves at least $50,000 worth of prizes before time expires, they keep all of the prizes they won in the bonus round; otherwise, they forfeit the prizes from this round. Regardless, they keep the prizes from the main game.

== Production ==
In 2017, NBC ordered a pilot for an American version of Raid the Cage, under the title Perfect Escape, with Sarah Michelle Gellar and Leslie Mann as hosts.

On June 30, 2023, it was announced that CBS had ordered the series. On August 3, 2023, it was announced that the series would premiere on October 13, 2023. On September 7, 2023, it was announced that Damon Wayans Jr. and Jeannie Mai would be the hosts of the show.

On May 2, 2024, the series was renewed for a second season, which serves as a winter series to be held in January and February during the time after Christmas and before the season 48 premiere of Survivor series that would be paired with the network's classic The Price Is Right at Night which premiered on January 8, 2025. However, the series is in doubt because of current litigation between the series producer, Sony Pictures Television, and Paramount Global, over a 1983 syndication agreement between Merv Griffin Productions and King World, which is now handled by their successor companies, Sony and Paramount, with two syndicated game shows distributed by Paramount's syndication arm and produced by Sony.

== Episodes ==
=== Series overview ===
Season	Episodes	Originally released	
Season	Episodes	First released	Last released
1	12	October 13, 2023	January 17, 2024
2	12	January 8, 2025	June 25, 2025

=== Season 1 (2023–24) ===
No. overall	No. in season	Title	Original release date	Prod. code	U.S. viewers (millions)
1	1	"Get In! Get Out! Get Rich!"	October 13, 2023	101	2.49
2	2	"Turning Up the Heat"	October 20, 2023	102	2.47
3	3	"Sister Sister"	October 27, 2023	103	2.17
4	4	"City Slickers vs. Chicken Farmers"	November 3, 2023	104	2.25
5	5	"Down, Set, Hut!"	November 10, 2023	105	2.38
6	6	"Seeing Double"	November 17, 2023	106	2.28
7	7	"Show Me the Matri-Money"	November 21, 2023	107	1.75
8	8	"Lovebirds Battle"	December 1, 2023	109	2.36
9	9	"Holiday Extravaganza"	December 8, 2023	109	2.19
10	10	"Best Friends"	January 3, 2024	110	2.69
11	11	"Old Friends vs. New Family"	January 10, 2024	111	2.83
12	12	"Mommas' Night"	January 17, 2024	112	2.65

=== Season 2 (2025) ===
No. overall	No. in season	Title	Original release date	Prod. code	U.S. viewers (millions)
13	1	"Grab Your Bestie"	January 8, 2025	207	2.49
14	2	"Bad to the Bone"	January 15, 2025	203	2.22
15	3	"Momma's House"	January 22, 2025	205	2.26
16	4	"Brains & Brawn"	January 29, 2025	208	1.94
17	5	"Poppa's House"	February 5, 2025	202	1.91
18	6	"The Amazing Race vs. Survivor"	February 12, 2025	212	2.03
19	7	"The Perfect Catch"	February 19, 2025	209	2.13
20	8	"Sibling Rivalry"	May 28, 2025	201	1.70
21	9	"Armed Forces"	June 4, 2025	211	1.77
22	10	"College Sweethearts"	June 11, 2025	204	1.97
23	11	"Families Who Raid Together"	June 18, 2025	206	2.09
24	12	"Ride or Die Besties"	June 25, 2025	210	2.24

== Reception ==
Viewership and ratings per episode of Raid the Cage
No.	Title	Air date	Rating (18–49)	Viewers (millions)
1	"Get In! Get Out! Get Rich!"	October 13, 2023	0.3	2.49
2	"Turning Up the Heat"	October 20, 2023	0.3	2.47
3	"Sister Sister"	October 27, 2023	0.3	2.17
4	"City Slickers vs. Chicken Farmers"	November 3, 2023	0.3	2.25
5	"Down, Set, Hut!"	November 10, 2023	0.3	2.38
6	"Seeing Double"	November 17, 2023	0.2	2.28
7	"Show Me the Matri-Money"	November 21, 2023	0.2	1.75
8	"Lovebirds Battle"	December 1, 2023	0.2	2.36
9	"Holiday Extravaganza"	December 8, 2023	0.2	2.19
10	"Best Friends"	January 3, 2024	0.3	2.69
11	"Old Friends vs. New Family"	January 10, 2024	0.3	2.83
12	"Mommas' Night"	January 17, 2024	0.4	2.65
