= Brooks Wheelan =

American comedian, actor and writer (born 1986)

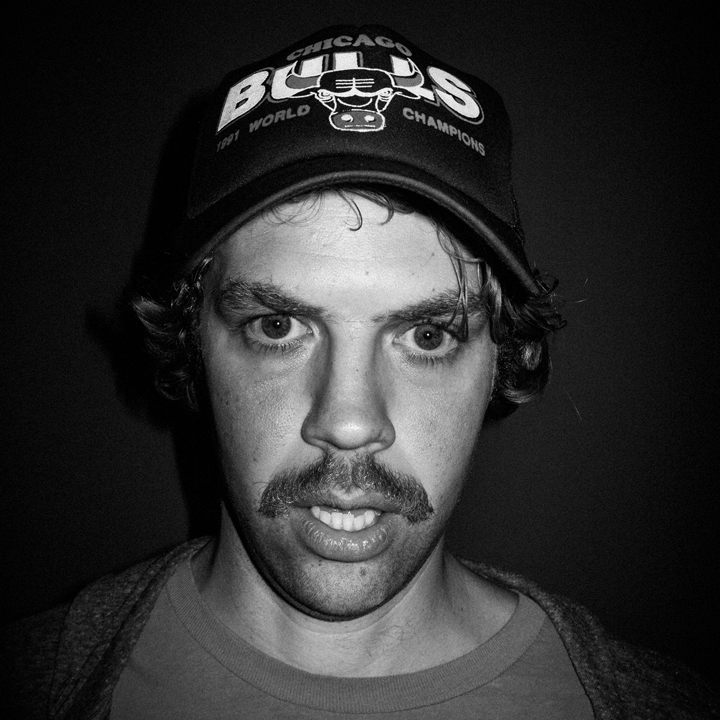
- Wheelan in 2012
- Born: August 21, 1986 (age 40); Cedar Rapids, Iowa, U.S.
- Education: University of Iowa
- Occupations: Stand-up comedian, actor, writer, podcaster
- Years active: 2013–present

Brooks Wheelan (born August 21, 1986) is an American stand-up comedian, actor, writer, and podcaster. First breaking through as a cast member and writer for the NBC sketch comedy series Saturday Night Live during the 2013–2014 season, Wheelan currently hosts the podcast Entry Level. He has also released a half-hour special for Comedy Central, acted in various movies and shows including Big Hero 6: The Series, and opened for John Oliver at numerous sets.

== Early life and education ==
Wheelan was born in Cedar Rapids, Iowa, on August 21, 1986, and raised in Manchester, Iowa, the son of Chris and Jim Wheelan.

Growing up, his interest mostly focused on science and mathematics. He performed regularly in Iowa City during his college years. He graduated from the University of Iowa in 2009 with a biomedical engineering degree.

== Career ==
Wheelan started performing stand-up comedy in his late teens in Iowa, then went to Kansas City and Chicago, before eventually moving to Los Angeles where he began to perform stand-up comedy full-time. Before joining Saturday Night Live, he performed stand-up comedy in Los Angeles while he had a job as a biomedical engineer, doing research on eyes and heart valves. In 2013, Wheelan was hired to write for Saturday Night Live for the 2013–2014 season and was made a cast member the week before the season started. After being fired from Saturday Night Live, Wheelan embarked on a stand-up tour entitled "The Brooks Wheelan Falls Back on Standup Comedy (Sorta) Tour", in reference to his firing. As part of his promotion for the tour he performed on Conan.

Wheelan's first stand-up comedy album This Is Cool, Right? was released on January 27, 2015 to critical acclaim. The Laugh Button called it "one of the best albums of 2015", while The A.V. Club wrote, "This Is Cool, Right? is at turns manic, honest, and completely absurd. Brooks crafts jokes not unlike sketches, and has an ear for storytelling that finds universal truths in the examining of his personal life." As part of the promotion for the record, he appeared on Late Night with Seth Meyers. Wheelan also performed a stand-up set on a September 2015 episode of Comedy Central's The Half Hour.

=== Saturday Night Live ===
Wheelan was a recurring guest on Saturday Night Live's Weekend Update segment, using his stand-up stories as public service announcements against irresponsible behavior.

On July 14, 2014, Wheelan announced through Twitter that he was fired from the cast of Saturday Night Live.

==== Impressions on Saturday Night Live ====
- Rand Paul
- Jared Leto
- Harry Styles
- Kid Rock
- Matthew McConaughey
- Slash
- Uncle Sam

=== Entry Level with Brooks Wheelan ===
On October 24, 2017, Wheelan launched the podcast Entry Level with Brooks Wheelan. In each episode, he interviews a guest on the often low-paying or undesirable jobs they had before they eventually achieved success in the entertainment industry.

== Personal life ==
Wheelan went to Dubuque Hempstead High School in Dubuque, Iowa.

== Filmography ==
Year	Title	Role	Notes
2013	Adam DeVine's House Party	Himself	
2013–2014	Saturday Night Live	Himself / Various Roles	Also writer
2014	The Chris Gethard Show	Himself	[Public Access] #136
2014	@midnight	Himself	
2015	Ridiculousness	Himself	
2015	Hawaii Five-0	Owen	
2015	Girls	Bryce	Episode: "Triggering"
2015	Better Off Single	Barry	
2015	The Half Hour	Himself	
2016	Those Who Can't	Ronnie	
2016	Random Tropical Paradise	Bowie Pemberton IV	
2016	To Tell the Truth	Himself / Guest Panelist	
2017–2021	Big Hero 6: The Series	Fredrick "Fred" Fredrickson IV	Voice
2018	The Attempt	Bryan	Also writer
2019	A.P. Bio	Seth	
2024	Based on a True Story	Bartender	Episode: "Based on a Drew Story"

== Discography ==
Year	Title
2015	This Is Cool, Right?
2024	Alive in Alaska
