= Shanghai Calling =

- Theatrical release poster
- Directed by: Daniel Hsia
- Written by: Daniel Hsia
- Produced by: Janet Yang
- Starring: Daniel Henney; Eliza Coupe; Bill Paxton
- Cinematography: Armando Salas
- Edited by: Pamela March
- Music by: Klaus Badelt; Christopher Carmichael
- Release date: 2012
- Running time: 98 minutes
- Countries: United States; China
- Language: English

Shanghai Calling is a 2012 American romantic-comedy film written and directed by Daniel Hsia and produced by Janet Yang. Starring Daniel Henney, Eliza Coupe, and Bill Paxton, Shanghai Calling is a story about a group of Americans from different walks of life, who are residing in Shanghai.

== Synopsis ==
An ambitious lawyer in New York City named Sam (Daniel Henney), who is of Chinese descent, wins a major case for his firm, Powell & Davies, but is told by the partners that he must supervise the Shanghai branch office for three months or he will not be promoted. Sam flies to Shanghai where he meets Marcus, the firm's most important client, who is CEO of a billion-dollar technology company. Marcus says that he wishes to pay 50 million to acquire a next-generation smartphone from a Chinese inventor, but Sam persuades him, in the interests of speed, to draft a leasing agreement instead, for 5 million. In the following days, Sam becomes acquainted with his Chinese subordinates Fang Fang and Guang, as well as members of the American expatriate community: Donald, a fast-food executive and president of the American Chamber of Commerce; Amanda, a relocation specialist who is fluent in Chinese; and Brad, an English teacher. However, Sam receives a phone call from Marcus, who is furious, having discovered that a Chinese factory is manufacturing and selling the same smartphone. Sam has a teleconference with the partners of Powell & Davies, who excoriate him and demand that he repair the situation.

Marcus and Sam meet with Lin, the owner of the Chinese factory, and his British lawyer. Sam successfully argues that Lin's contract with the Chinese inventor is invalid, since Marcus's was signed a day earlier. Lin agrees to cease production. However, he reneges on his promise, and newly produced smartphones continue to pour into Shanghai's shops. Furthermore, Sam discovers that the British lawyer was a fraud. Namely, he was an actor hired by Lin to pose as a lawyer. With no means of contacting Lin, Sam hires Awesome Wang, a journalist who works on the side as a private investigator. Awesome Wang tracks down the British actor and pressures him into disclosing Lin's residential address, but it turns out to be vacant. Powell & Davies castigates Sam and demands his return to New York. When all appears to be lost, Sam turns to Amanda for help. The latter performs a real-estate search linking the residential address to a factory. Brad offers Awesome Wang and Sam a ride to the factory, and, with the help of Guang's cousin, Sam expedites a legal injunction to have the factory shut down, despite Lin's pleading.

Meanwhile, Esther, a highly educated American of Chinese descent, wins the election at the American Chamber of Commerce, replacing Donald as the president. She haughtily points out that Shanghai is quickly becoming a crossroads for the world's best and brightest, and is no longer a haven for middling Americans like Donald, Amanda, and Brad, who could not make it big in their own country. Sam also comments, to Amanda, that he is impressed by Shanghai's rapid economic growth, and by the density of luxury brands within the city which serves to reflect the changing times. Sam informs Marcus of the closing of Lin's factory, and offers to take the entire blame for Lin's actions, hoping to put the matter to rest. However, Awesome Wang and the Chinese inventor enter the room and reveal that Marcus lied all along. Marcus had, in fact, forged the Chinese inventor's signature on the contract, after arriving too late and being turned down by the inventor. Powell & Davies contacts Sam, and, to his surprise, commands Sam to forgive Marcus and to continue assisting him, owing to Marcus's influence and wealth. Sam, in defiance of Powell & Davies, resigns and opens his own law firm in order to represent Lin. The Chinese staff of Powell & Davies resign and join him. Sam also starts a relationship with Amanda and applies himself toward studying the Chinese language.

== Cast ==
- Daniel Henney as Sam Chao, a Sino American lawyer sent to work in Shanghai for three months.
- Eliza Coupe as Amanda Wilson, a relocation-specialist residing in Shanghai who is fluent in Chinese.
- Bill Paxton as Donald Cafferty, a fast-food executive residing in Shanghai.
- Alan Ruck as Marcus Groff, CEO of a billion-dollar technology company, who has recently settled in Shanghai.
- Geng Le as Awesome Wang, a journalist and private investigator.
- Zhu Zhu as Fang Fang, an office assistant.
- Sean Gallagher as Brad
- Lu Cai as Guang.

== Awards ==
Daniel Henney won a Best Actor award at the 2012 Newport Beach Film Festival, and Daniel Hsia won a Best New Director / Outstanding First Feature Award at the 2012 Los Angeles Asian Pacific Film Festival.
