= Fredzilla =

Fictional character in the Marvel universe

- Fred as depicted in Big Hero 6 #5 (March 2009). Art by David Nakayama.

Publication information
- Publisher: Marvel Comics
- First appearance: Big Hero 6 #1 (September 2008)
- Created by: Chris Claremont; David Nakayama

In-story information
- Alter ego: Fred
- Species: Human
- Team affiliations: Big Hero 6
- Abilities: Kaiju transformation Dinosaur aura generation

Fred (nicknamed Fredzilla) is a fictional character appearing in American comic books published by Marvel Comics. He is a member of the superhero team Big Hero 6.

The character appears in the 2014 animated film Big Hero 6 and the video game Kingdom Hearts III, voiced by T.J. Miller and in the subsequent animated series by Brooks Wheelan. This version is a human who wields a fire-breathing dragon suit.

== Publication history ==
The character was created by Chris Claremont and David Nakayama and first appeared in Big Hero 6 #1 (September 2008). He along with Wasabi-No-Ginger were meant to serve as replacements for then-current members Sunpyre and Ebon Samurai.

== Fictional character biography ==
Fred is descended from the Ainu, an indigenous people of Japan, and spent part of his childhood on a secret S.H.I.E.L.D. base. He later joins Big Hero 6 using his ability to transform into a dinosaur-like kaiju.

During the Ends of the Earth storyline, Fred and Big Hero 6 are among the heroes who assist Spider-Man in taking down Doctor Octopus' satellites. They battle Everwraith, a humanoid embodiment of those killed in the bombings of Hiroshima and Nagasaki who is guarding one of Doctor Octopus' facilities.

== Powers and abilities ==
Fred can transform into a Godzilla-like Kaiju. In addition, he can generate an aura that manifests an image of the Kaiju without transforming.

== Reception ==
In 2020, Comic Book Resources (CBR) ranked Fred 9th in their "Marvel Comics: Ranking Every Member Of Big Hero 6 From Weakest To Most Powerful" list.

== In other media ==
=== Disney version ===
Fred
- Big Hero 6 character
- Walt Disney Animation Studios re-imagining of Fred
- First appearance: Big Hero 6 (2014)
- Adapted by: Don Hall; Chris Williams
- Voiced by: T. J. Miller (film, Kingdom Hearts III); Brooks Wheelan (TV series)

In-universe information
- Aliases: Fredzilla; Fredmeleon
- Nicknames: Flame Jumper (by Karmi); Lizard Guy (by Richardson Mole)
- Gender: Male
- Full name: Frederick Flamarian Frederickson IV

==== Film ====
Fred appears in the Walt Disney Animation Studios 2014 animated film Big Hero 6, voiced by T. J. Miller. This version is American and the mascot at the San Fransokyo Institute of Technology. Speaking of Miller, co-director Chris Williams said "He's a real student of comedy. There are a lot of layers to his performance, so Fred ended up becoming a richer character than anyone expected."

Fred considers himself a "major science enthusiast" and is always asking his friends to build and design things that are outside the laws of probability. Fred has a blue dragon suit built for him by Hiro Hamada which allows him to leap great distances and shoot fire. During the film, Fred's friends learn that he is incredibly wealthy, resulting in him providing the financial support and necessary training for them to become superheroes. In the post-credits scene, Fred discovers that his father (voiced by and modeled after Stan Lee) is a retired superhero after he unexpectedly returns from vacation. As they embrace each other, Fred's father says that he and Fred have much to talk about.

==== Television ====
Fred appears in Big Hero 6: The Series, voiced by Brooks Wheelan. He pushes the team to continue crime fighting and he comes up with the name "Big Hero 6." In the episode "Mini-Max", it is shown that Fred has an uncontrollable destructive side when no one is fighting crime with him, resulting in Hiro designing a "sidekick" (really a nanny of sorts) named Mini-Max.

In the second season, Fred gets a new chameleon outfit dubbed "Fredmeleon" which is equipped with an adhesive and elongated tongue and allows him to cling to walls and become invisible. In the third season, Fred gains a love interest in the form of Olivia Mole, the cousin of his archenemy Richardson Mole.

==== Video games ====
- Fred appears as a limited-time unlockable playable character in Disney Magic Kingdoms.
- Fred appears as a playable character in Disney Heroes: Battle Mode.
- Fred appears as an assist character in Kingdom Hearts III, voiced again by T. J. Miller in the English version and by Hideto Nitta in Japanese.

==== Other appearances ====
Fred makes a cameo appearance in Once Upon a Studio.
