= Damon Wayans Jr. =

American actor and comedian (born 1982)

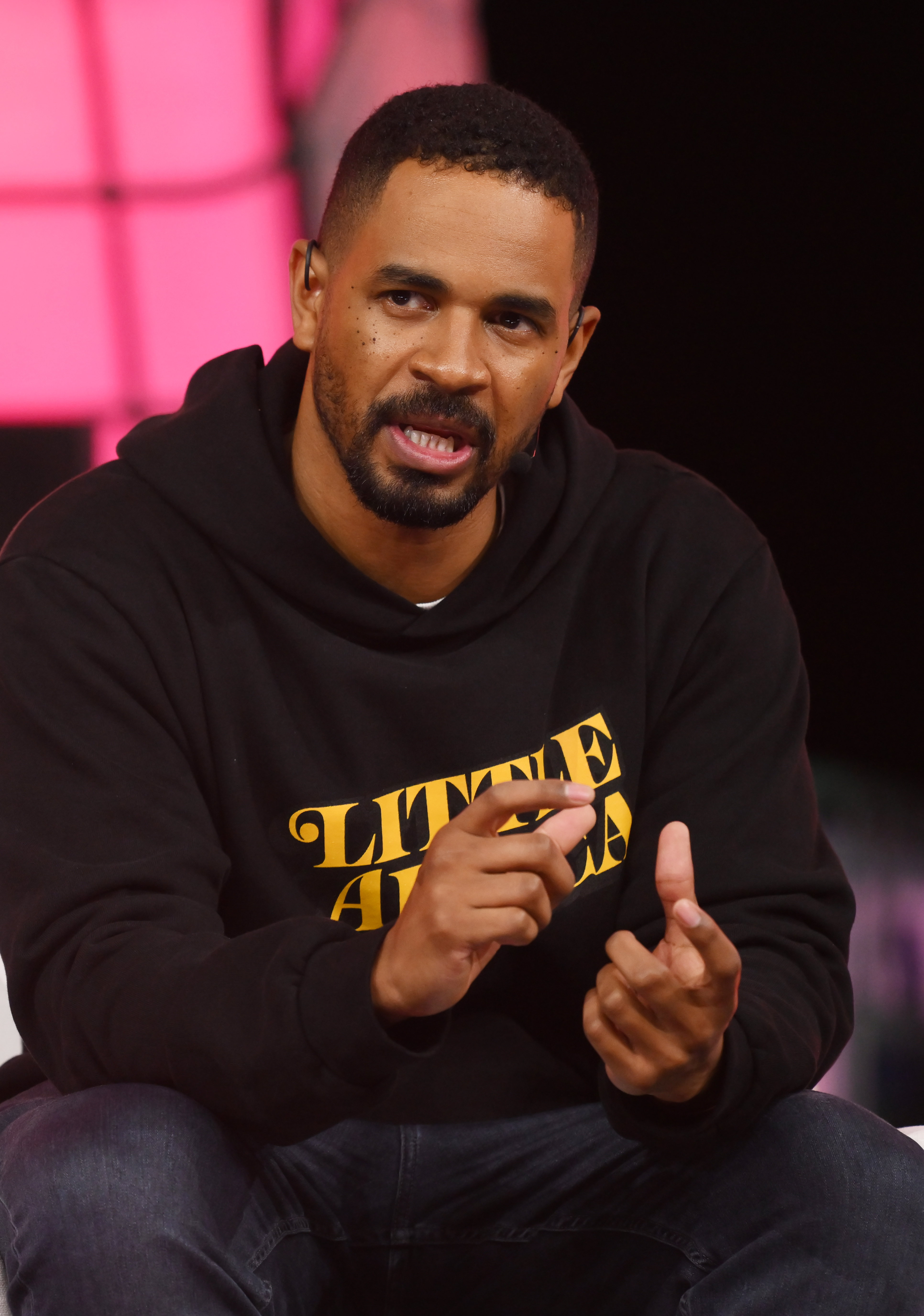
- Wayans in 2022
- Born: Damon Kyle Wayans Jr. November 18, 1982 (age 43); Huntington, Vermont, U.S.
- Occupations: Actor; comedian
- Years active: 1994–present
- Spouse: Samara Saraiva (m. 2016)
- Children: 6
- Father: Damon Wayans
- Relatives: Wayans family

Damon Kyle Wayans Jr. (/ˈweɪ.ənz/ WAY-ənz; born November 18, 1982) is an American actor and comedian. He starred as Brad Williams in the ABC sitcom Happy Endings (2011–2013), for which he was nominated for a Critics' Choice Television Award in 2012, and as Coach in the Fox sitcom New Girl (2011, 2014–2015). He also provided the voice of Wasabi in the Disney animated film Big Hero 6 (2014). Since 2023, Wayans has hosted the game show Raid the Cage on CBS.

He is the oldest son of actor and comedian Damon Wayans, and nephew of Dwayne Wayans, Keenen Ivory Wayans, Kim Wayans, Shawn Wayans and Marlon Wayans.

== Early life ==
Wayans was born on November 18, 1982, in Huntington, Vermont, to Lisa Thorner and actor and comedian Damon Wayans of the Wayans family. He has three younger siblings: Michael, Cara Mia, and Kyla.

== Career ==
=== 1994–2010: Early credits ===
Wayans made his film debut in 1994 when he was cast in his father's feature film, Blankman, playing Young Kevin. He later appeared on his father's sitcom My Wife and Kids as John, one of Junior's friends. He later worked as a staff writer on the series.

Wayans began performing stand-up under the pseudonym Kyle Green, in an attempt to establish an identity separate from his family. In 2006, he appeared in and served as a writer on The Underground under his real name. Wayans also surprised audiences when he garnered a standing ovation during his debut appearance on Def Comedy Jam. He starred in the Wayans family comedy Dance Flick as the film's main character, Thomas. In 2010, he appeared in the Adam McKay comedy film The Other Guys.

=== 2011–2016: Happy Endings and New Girl ===
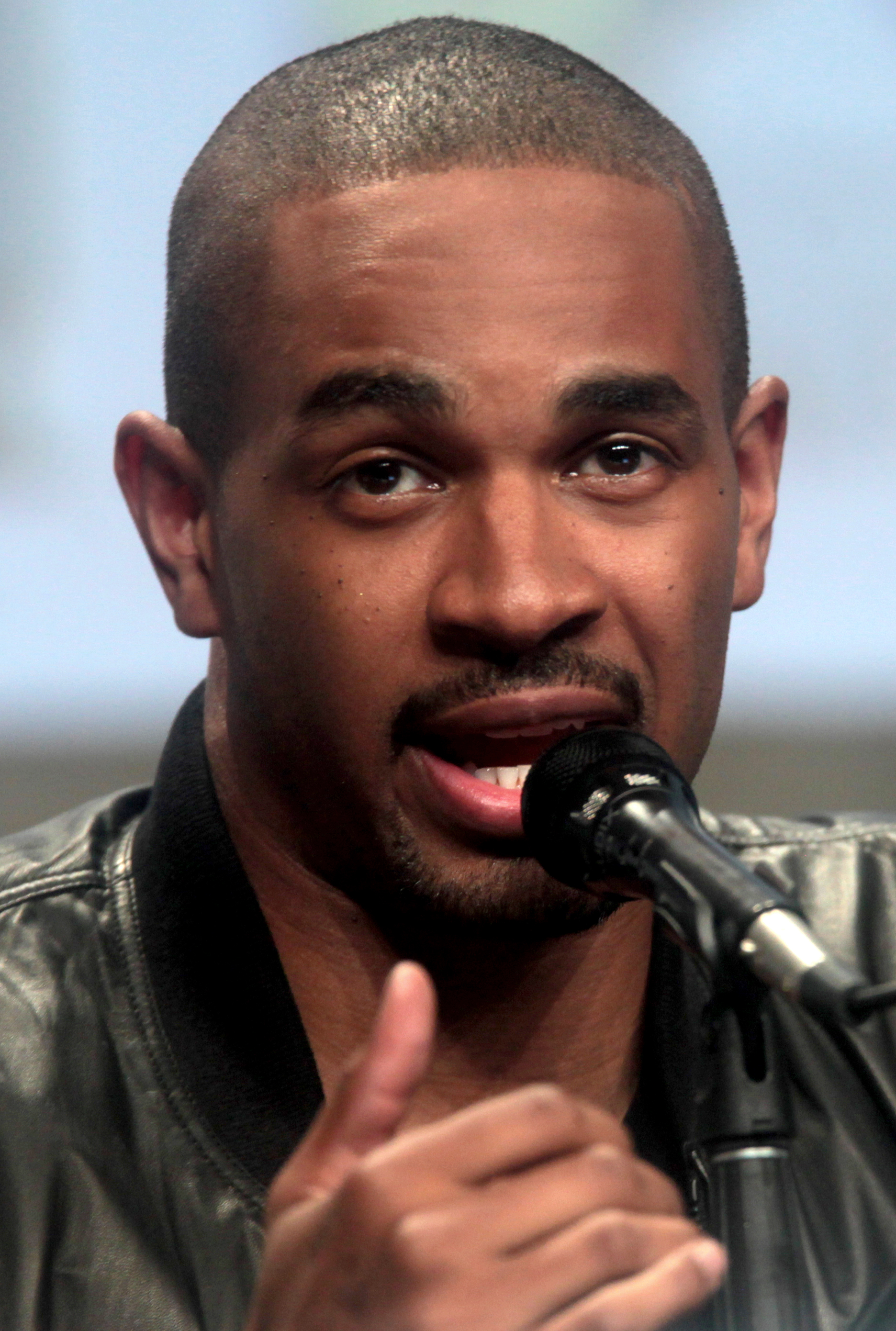
Wayans at the 2014 San Diego Comic-Con

From April 2011 to May 2013, Wayans starred as Brad Williams, one of the lead characters in the ABC comedy series Happy Endings, for which he was nominated for a Critics Choice Television Award and two NAACP Image Awards. Despite critical acclaim and a cult following, the show was cancelled by ABC after concluding its third season.

On May 16, 2011, the Fox Network announced that it had picked up the Zooey Deschanel-anchored comedy New Girl, which featured Wayans in the supporting role of Coach. However, Happy Endings had already been picked up for a second season on rival network ABC. The producers of New Girl initially planned to recast Wayans' role, but later decided not to recast nor reshoot the pilot episode in which he appeared. Instead, starting with the second episode, Wayans' character was substituted with Lamorne Morris, playing the role of Winston.

With Happy Endings cancelled after its third season, it was announced in July 2013 that Wayans would return for at least four episodes of New Girl in the upcoming third season. In November 2013, it was announced that Wayans would remain on the show for the rest of season 3. In May 2014, it was announced Wayans would return as a series regular for season four.

In 2014, he voiced Wasabi in the Disney animated film Big Hero 6, for which he was nominated for Outstanding Voice Performance at the Black Reel Awards. He also appeared in the romantic comedy film Someone Marry Barry and starred in the film Let's Be Cops alongside New Girl co-star Jake Johnson.

=== Since 2016-present: Two Shakes Entertainment and other projects ===
In early 2018, he made a cameo in the comedy film Super Troopers 2, and later starred in the Epix murder thriller series The Truth About the Harry Quebert Affair. In October of that year, it was announced that Wayans would star in the CBS sitcom Happy Together. The series was canceled after 13 episodes due to low ratings. In November, he launched a production company titled Two Shakes Entertainment. Its first show, the comedy drama Glamorous, was initially ordered by The CW before premiering on Netflix in 2023. In 2019, he guest-starred on the IFC sketch comedy show Sherman's Showcase.

In 2020, he starred in the Netflix romantic comedy film Love, Guaranteed. He also appeared in the CBS anthology series The Twilight Zone, as well as the Netflix animated series Hoops. In 2021, Wayans appeared in five films: the comedy Barb and Star Go to Vista Del Mar, the Apple TV+ crime drama Cherry, the romcom Long Weekend, the Netflix Western The Harder They Fall, and the comedy Supercool. He began hosting the Peacock game show Frogger, based on the video game of the same name. He also appeared in the NBC sitcom Kenan that same year.

Wayans began hosting the NBC game show Raid the Cage in 2023, based on the Israeli television series of the same name. In 2024, he starred alongside his father Damon Wayans on the CBS sitcom Poppa's House, loosely inspired by their real-life relationship. Despite winning an NAACP Image Award for Outstanding Supporting Actor in a Comedy Series for his performance, the series was canceled after its first season. The same year, he appeared in the Apple TV+ show Shrinking as Derrick #2. He was nominated for Outstanding Guest Performance in a Comedy Series at the Black Reel TV Awards for his performance. He also starred in the Netflix romcom Players, and appeared in the Netflix comedy film Kinda Pregnant in 2025.

Wayans will appear in the upcoming horror parody film, Scary Movie, the sixth installment in the Scary Movie franchise. He is set to appear in the CBS comedy Overstepping, which was first announced in November 2024. In February 2026, it was announced that he would lead the NBC drama pilot Puzzled based on the Danielle Trussoni novel The Puzzle Master.

== Personal life ==
Damon Wayans Jr. has six children. He has two daughters with high school ex-girlfriend Aja Metoyer. He has four children with his wife Samara Saraiva: two daughters and two sons. They also have one granddaughter named Itali, from daughter Berlyn Wayans and her high school ex-boyfriend, Mike Price.

== Filmography ==
=== Film ===
Year	Title	Role	Notes
1994	Blankman	Young Kevin Walker	
2001	Scary Movie 2	Police Officer (Uncredited; Alternate Ending)	
2009	Dance Flick	Thomas Uncles	
2010	Marmaduke	Thunder	Voice
2010	The Other Guys	Detective Fosse	
2014	Someone Marry Barry	Desmond	
2014	Let's Be Cops	Justin G. Miller	
2014	Big Hero 6	Wasabi	Voice
2016	The Land Before Time XIV: Journey of the Brave	Wild Arms	Voice
2016	How to Be Single	David Stone	
2018	Super Troopers 2	Trooper Wagner	
2019	Trouble	Gizmo	Voice
2020	Love, Guaranteed	Nick Evans	
2021	Barb and Star Go to Vista Del Mar	Darlie Bunkle	
2021	Cherry	Drill Sgt. Masters	
2021	Long Weekend	Doug	
2021	The Harder They Fall	Monroe Grimes	
2021	Supercool	Jimmy	
2024	Players	Adam	
2025	Kinda Pregnant	Dave	
2026	Scary Movie	Agent Underwood	

=== Television ===
Year	Title	Role	Notes
2001–2004	My Wife and Kids	John	8 episodes; also story editor
2006	The Underground	Cast member	
2011–2013	Happy Endings	Brad Williams	Main cast, 3 seasons Nominated – Critics' Choice Television Award for Best Supporting Actor in a Comedy Series; Nominated – NAACP Image Award for Outstanding Actor in a Comedy Series (2012–2013); Nominated – Teen Choice Award for Choice TV Male Scene Stealer
2011, 2013–2016, 2018	New Girl	Coach	Main cast (season 1 "Pilot", season 4); Recurring (season 3); Special guest star (season 5–7)
2012	Happy Endings: Happy Rides	Brad Williams	2 episodes
2012	NTSF:SD:SUV::	Garett	Episode: "The Real Bicycle Thief"
2016	Brooklyn Nine-Nine	Detective Stevie Schillens	Episode: "The 9–8"
2017	Curb Your Enthusiasm	Police Officer	Episode: "A Disturbance in the Kitchen"
2018	The Truth About The Harry Quebert Affair	Sgt. Perry Gahalowood	Main cast
2018–2019	Happy Together	Jake Davis	Main cast
2019	Sherman's Showcase	Montell Jordan	Episode: "July 8, 1995"
2019–2025	Bob's Burgers	Arnold	6 episodes
2020	The Twilight Zone	Jason Grant	Episode: "A Small Town"
2020	Hoops	Damian Chapman	Episode: "The Strike"
2021	Kenan	Sateen	Episode: "Flipp'd"
2021	Frogger	Host	13 episodes; based on the video game Frogger
2023	Glamorous	–	Executive producer
2023–present	Raid the Cage	Host	Also executive producer
2024–2025	Poppa's House	Damon	Main cast; also executive producer
2024-Present	Shrinking	Derrick #2	Recurring
TBA	Overstepping	TBA	Executive producer
TBA	Puzzled	Mike Brink	

== Awards and nominations ==
Award	Year	Category	Nominated work	Result	Ref.
Black Reel Awards	2015	Outstanding Voice Performance	Big Hero 6	Nominated	
Black Reel TV Awards	2025	Outstanding Guest Performance in a Comedy Series	Shrinking	Nominated	
Critics Choice Television Awards	2012	Best Supporting Actor in a Comedy Series	Happy Endings	Nominated	
NAACP Image Awards	2012	Outstanding Supporting Actor in a Comedy Series	Happy Endings	Nominated	
NAACP Image Awards	2013	Outstanding Actor in a Comedy Series	Happy Endings	Nominated	
NAACP Image Awards	2025	Outstanding Supporting Actor in a Comedy Series	Poppa's House	Won	
Nickelodeon Kids' Choice Awards	2025	Favorite Male TV Star (Family)	Poppa's House	Nominated	
Teen Choice Awards	2012	Choice TV: Male Scene Stealer	Happy Endings	Nominated	
