= Proximity Effect (comics) =

Cover of the paperback

Proximity Effect is a comic book series written by Scott Tucker and Aron Coleite. Penciled by David Nakayama. This OGN saw its first two issues published online, with the third available only as part of the trade paperback.

The series is about some humans that have the capacity for superhuman abilities, but only when within a certain distance of another special human. This "proximity effect" has been studied by the US government and private citizens. Since the 'generator' individuals are infinitely rarer than the "receivers", a race has begun to find these people and sequence their genes for that particular trait.
