= Black Reel Award for Outstanding Voice Performance =

Award presented annually by the Black Reel Awards

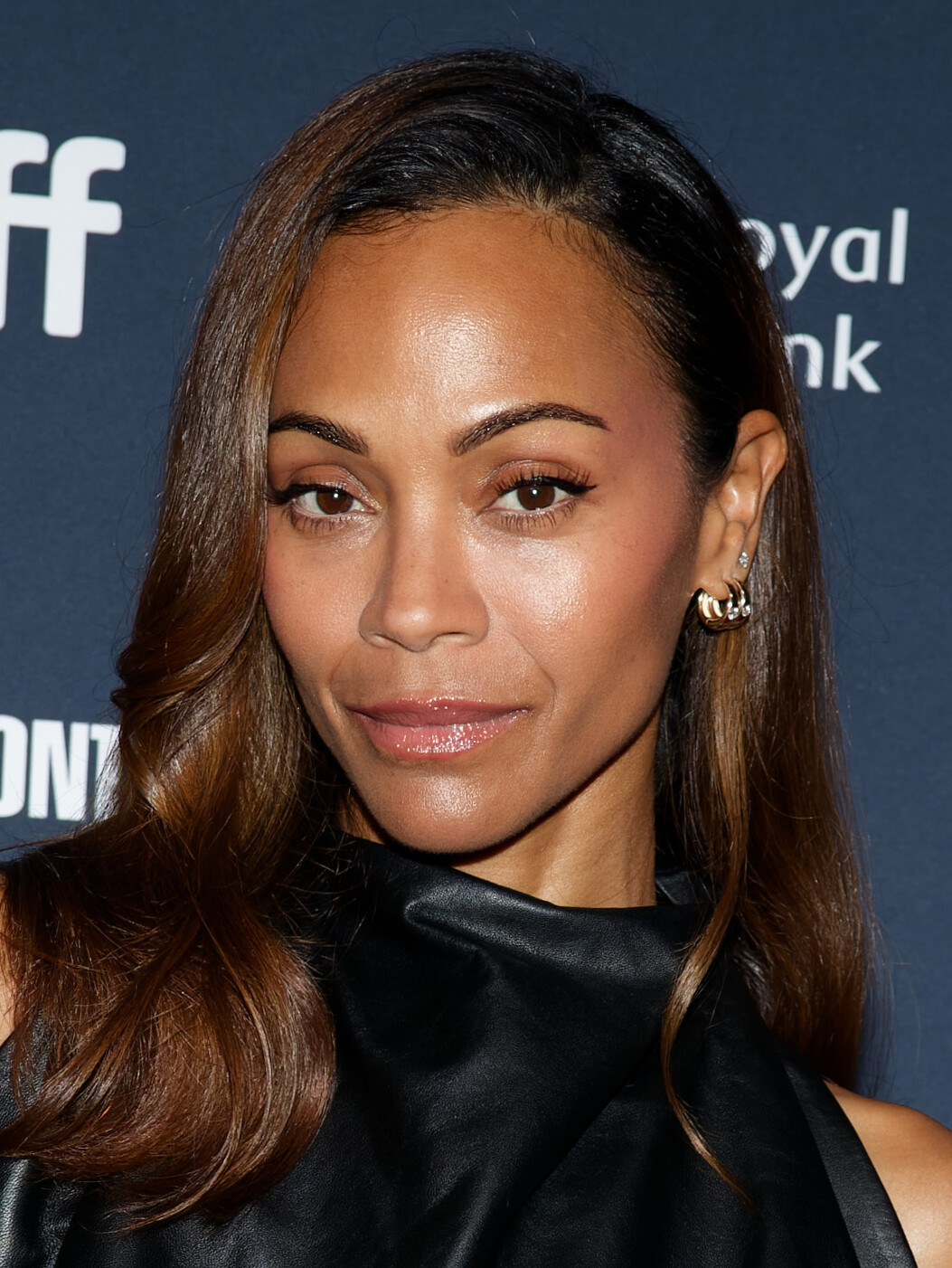
- The 2026 recipient: Zoe Saldaña
- Awarded for: Outstanding Voice Performance
- Country: United States
- Presented by: Black Reel Awards (BRAs)
- First award: Black Reel Awards of 2010
- Most recent winner: Zoe Saldaña; Avatar: Fire and Ash (Black Reel Awards of 2026)
- Website: blackreelawards.com

This article lists the winners and nominees for the Black Reel Award for Outstanding Voice Performance. This category was first presented in 2010, but was retired until the 2013 ceremony.

== Winners and nominees ==
Winners are listed first and highlighted in bold.

=== 2010s ===
Year	Actor / Actress	Film	Ref
2010
2010	**Anika Noni Rose**	**The Princess and the Frog**	
2010	Keith David	Coraline	
2010	Keith David	The Princess and the Frog	
2010	Delroy Lindo	Up	
2010	Forest Whitaker	Where the Wild Things Are	
2011–12	—N/a		
2013
2013	**Dennis Haysbert**	**Wreck-It Ralph**	
2013	Chris Rock	Madagascar 3: Europe's Most Wanted	
2013	Queen Latifah	Ice Age: Continental Drift	
2013	Wanda Sykes	Ice Age: Continental Drift	
2013	Tempestt Bledsoe	ParaNorman	
2014
2014	**Samuel L. Jackson**	**Turbo**	
2014	Beyoncé	Epic	
2014	Keith David	Free Birds	
2014	Snoop Dogg	Turbo	
2014	Maya Rudolph	Turbo	
2015
2015	**Morgan Freeman**	**The Lego Movie**	
2015	Vin Diesel	Guardians of the Galaxy	
2015	Maya Rudolph	Big Hero 6	
2015	Damon Wayans Jr.	Big Hero 6	
2015	Zoe Saldaña	The Book of Life	
2016
2016	**Rihanna**	**Home**	
2016	Maya Rudolph	Strange Magic	
2016	Marelik Walker	The Peanuts Movie	
2016	Quvenzhané Wallis	The Prophet	
2016	Jeffrey Wright	The Good Dinosaur	
2017
2017	**Idris Elba**	**The Jungle Book**	
2017	Idris Elba	Finding Dory	
2017	Idris Elba	Zootopia	
2017	Dwayne Johnson	Moana	
2017	Lupita Nyong'o	The Jungle Book	
2018
2018	**Vin Diesel**	**Guardians of the Galaxy Vol. 2**	
2018	Kevin Hart	Captain Underpants: The First Epic Movie	
2018	Jenifer Lewis	Cars 3	
2018	Maya Rudolph	The Emoji Movie	
2018	Maya Rudolph	The Nut Job 2: Nutty by Nature	
2019
2019	**Shameik Moore**	**Spider-Man: Into the Spider-Verse**	
2019	Mahershala Ali	Spider-Man: Into the Spider-Verse	
2019	Brian Tyree Henry	Spider-Man: Into the Spider-Verse	
2019	Taraji P. Henson	Ralph Breaks the Internet	
2019	Samuel L. Jackson	Incredibles 2	

=== 2020s ===
Year	Actor / Actress	Film	Ref
2020
2020	**Chiwetel Ejiofor**	**The Lion King**	
2020	James Earl Jones	The Lion King	
2020	Donald Glover	The Lion King	
2020	Jordan Peele	Toy Story 4	
2020	Keegan-Michael Key	Toy Story 4	
2021
2021	**Jamie Foxx**	**Soul**	
2021	Angela Bassett	Soul	
2021	Phylicia Rashad	Soul	
2021	Maya Rudolph	The Willoughbys	
2021	Octavia Spencer	Onward	
2022
2022	**Maya Rudolph**	**The Mitchells vs. the Machines**	
2022	Eric André	The Mitchells vs. the Machines	
2022	Marsai Martin	Spirit Untamed	
2022	Maya Rudolph	Luca	
2022	Zoe Saldaña	Vivo	
2023
2023	**Zoe Saldaña**	**Avatar: The Way of Water**	
2023	Zazie Beetz	The Bad Guys	
2023	Idris Elba	Sonic the Hedgehog 2	
2023	Keke Palmer	Lightyear	
2023	Gabrielle Union	Strange World	
2024
2024	**Shameik Moore**	**Spider-Man: Across the Spider-Verse**	
2024	Brian Tyree Henry	Spider-Man: Across the Spider-Verse	
2024	Daniel Kaluuya	Spider-Man: Across the Spider-Verse	
2024	Ayo Edebiri	Teenage Mutant Ninja Turtles: Mutant Mayhem	
2024	Ariana DeBose	Wish	
2025
2025	**Lupita Nyong'o**	**The Wild Robot**	
2025	Ayo Edebiri	Inside Out 2	
2025	Brian Tyree Henry	Transformers One	
2025	Dwayne Johnson	Moana 2	
2025	Aaron Pierre	Mufasa: The Lion King	
2026
2026	**Zoe Saldaña**	**Avatar: Fire and Ash**	
2026	Danielle Brooks	The Bad Guys 2	
2026	Quinta Brunson	Zootopia 2	
2026	Idris Elba	Zootopia 2	
2026	Anthony Ramos	The Bad Guys 2	

== Multiple nominations and wins ==
=== Multiple wins ===
2 wins

- Shameik Moore
- Zoe Saldaña

=== Multiple nominations ===
8 nominations

- Maya Rudolph

5 nominations

- Idris Elba

4 nominations

- Zoe Saldaña

3 nominations

- Keith David
- Brian Tyree Henry

2 nominations

- Vin Diesel
- Ayo Edebiri
- Samuel L. Jackson
- Dwayne Johnson
- Shameik Moore
- Lupita Nyong'o

== Multiple nominations from the same film ==
- Anika Noni Rose (winner) & Keith David in The Princess and the Frog (2010)
- Queen Latifah and Wanda Sykes in Ice Age: Continental Drift (2013)
- Samuel L. Jackson (winner), Snoop Dogg and Maya Rudolph in Turbo (2014)
- Maya Rudolph and Damon Wayans Jr. in Big Hero 6 (2015)
- Idris Elba (winner) & Lupita Nyong'o in The Jungle Book (2017)
- Shameik Moore (winner), Mahershala Ali & Brian Tyree Henry in Spider-Man: Into the Spider-Verse (2019)
- Chiwetel Ejiofor (winner), James Earl Jones & Donald Glover in The Lion King (2020)
- Jordan Peele & Keegan-Michael Key in Toy Story 4 (2020)
- Jamie Foxx (winner), Angela Bassett & Phylicia Rashad in Soul (2021)
- Maya Rudolph (winner) & Eric André in The Mitchells vs. the Machines (2022)
- Shameik Moore (winner), Brian Tyree Henry & Daniel Kaluuya in Spider-Man: Across the Spider-Verse (2023)
- Danielle Brooks & Anthony Ramos in The Bad Guys 2 (2025)
- Quinta Brunson & Idris Elba in Zootopia 2 (2025)
