= Big Hero 6 (film) =

2014 Disney animated film

- Theatrical release poster
- Directed by: Don Hall; Chris Williams
- Screenplay by: Jordan Roberts; Robert L. Baird; Daniel Gerson
- Based on: Big Hero 6 by Man of Action
- Produced by: Roy Conli
- Starring: Scott Adsit; Ryan Potter; Daniel Henney; T. J. Miller; Jamie Chung; Damon Wayans Jr.; Genesis Rodriguez; James Cromwell; Maya Rudolph; Alan Tudyk
- Cinematography: Rob Dressel (layout); Adolph Lusinsky (lighting)
- Edited by: Tim Mertens
- Music by: Henry Jackman
- Production company: Walt Disney Animation Studios
- Distributed by: Walt Disney Studios; Motion Pictures (Note: Distributed under the Walt Disney Pictures banner.)
- Release dates: October 23, 2014 (Tokyo International Film Festival); November 7, 2014 (United States)
- Running time: 102 minutes
- Country: United States
- Language: English
- Budget: $165 million
- Box office: $672.1 million

Big Hero 6 is a 2014 American animated superhero film loosely based on the Marvel Comics superhero team Big Hero 6. Produced by Walt Disney Animation Studios, it was directed by Don Hall and Chris Williams, and written by Jordan Roberts, Robert L. Baird and Daniel Gerson. It stars the voices of Scott Adsit, Ryan Potter, Daniel Henney, T.J. Miller, Jamie Chung, Damon Wayans Jr., Genesis Rodriguez, James Cromwell, Maya Rudolph and Alan Tudyk. The film follows Hiro Hamada (Potter), a young robotics prodigy, and Baymax (Adsit), a healthcare robot invented by Hiro's elder brother, Tadashi (Henney), as they form a superhero team to combat a masked supervillain responsible for Tadashi's death. It is the first Disney animated film to feature Marvel Comics characters, whose parent company was acquired by Disney in 2009. Walt Disney Animation Studios created new software technology to produce the animation.

Big Hero 6 debuted at the 27th Tokyo International Film Festival on October 23, 2014 and was released in the United States on November 7. It received positive reviews from critics and grossed $672 million, becoming the highest-grossing animated film of 2014. At the 87th Academy Awards, the film won Best Animated Feature. It additionally received a septet of nominations for Annie Awards, winning one, and a Golden Globe nomination. The film was followed by a trio of television series: Big Hero 6: The Series premiered in 2017, Baymax Dreams premiered in 2018 and Baymax! premiered in 2022.

== Plot ==
In the futuristic city of San Fransokyo, (Note: A portmanteau of San Francisco and Tokyo) Hiro Hamada, a 14-year-old high school graduate and robotics prodigy, spends his time competing in illegal underground betting for robot fights. Hoping to get Hiro out of this dangerous lifestyle, his inventive older brother Tadashi takes him to the San Fransokyo Institute of Technology, where Hiro meets Tadashi's best friends: gritty Go Go Tomago, neurotic Wasabi, bubbly Honey Lemon and laid-back Fred. Tadashi additionally introduces his project, an inflatable artificially intelligent healthcare robot named Baymax. After meeting Tadashi's mentor, Professor Robert Callaghan, Hiro applies to the university, impressing the school's showcase with his own project – microbots that can link together into any configuration using a neural transmitter. Hiro is accepted, but a fire breaks out while Callaghan is still in the building. Tadashi rushes back inside to save him, only for the building to explode, apparently killing both men.

Two weeks later, Hiro inadvertently activates Baymax. His only remaining microbot begins to move on its own, so he and Baymax follow it to an abandoned warehouse. Inside, they discover the microbots being mass-produced by a Kabuki mask-wearing supervillain known as "Yokai", who tries to dispose of Hiro and Baymax, but they narrowly escape. Deducing that Yokai was the mastermind behind the fire, Hiro weaponizes Baymax for defense and Tadashi's friends, whom Baymax contacted, meet up with them. Yokai pursues the group through the streets, but Baymax saves them. At Fred's residence, Hiro upgrades Baymax and the group weaponizes their own inventions to combat Yokai.

Believing Yokai to be Alistair Krei, a tech mogul who had wanted to buy the microbots at the showcase, the group tracks him to an abandoned Krei Tech laboratory on a remote island. They discover that it was used for teleportation research, but the government shut it down after a prototype portal destabilized, trapping a test pilot inside. The group are soon ambushed by Yokai, but they manage to remove his mask, revealing him to be Callaghan, who had faked his death using the stolen microbots. Enraged at Callaghan's indifference to Tadashi's death, Hiro removes Baymax's healthcare chip and orders him to kill Callaghan despite his friends' objections. Baymax obeys Hiro's commands, but Honey Lemon reinstalls his healthcare chip, restoring his former personality as Callaghan escapes. Feeling betrayed by his friends' actions, Hiro leaves with Baymax, intent on avenging Tadashi. When he attempts to remove Baymax's healthcare chip again, Baymax recognizes Hiro's recklessness and shows him archived footage of his development, reminding him that Tadashi's goal was to help people. After Hiro apologizes to Baymax and his friends, they discover that the lost test pilot was Callaghan's daughter, Abigail.

Now prepared to take revenge on Krei for Abigail's apparent death, Callaghan reactivates the teleportation portal to demolish Krei's headquarters, but Hiro, Baymax, and their friends defeat him and save Krei. Baymax detects Abigail still alive inside the portal. Despite Krei's warnings about the unstable portal, Hiro and Baymax enter it and find Abigail trapped in stasis. Baymax is struck by debris and damaged, forcing Hiro to leave him behind. Baymax uses his rocket fist to propel Hiro and Abigail out of the portal before it is destroyed. In the aftermath, a regretful Callaghan is arrested while an awakened Abigail is hospitalized. Sometime later, after beginning his tenure at the institute with his friends, Hiro discovers Baymax's healthcare chip clenched in the rocket fist, allowing him to rebuild Baymax, and they continue to defend San Fransokyo in Tadashi's memory.

== Voice cast ==
- Ryan Potter as Hiro Hamada, a fourteen-year-old robotics prodigy. Speaking of the character, Hall said "Hiro is transitioning from boy to man, it's a tough time for a kid and some teenagers develop that inevitable snarkiness and jaded attitude. Luckily Ryan is a very likeable kid. So no matter what he did, he was able to take the edge off the character in a way that made him authentic, but appealing".
- Scott Adsit as Baymax, an inflatable robot invented by Tadashi as a medical assistant. Co-director Don Hall said, "Baymax views the world from one perspective – he just wants to help people, he sees Hiro as his patient". Producer Roy Conli said "The fact that his character is a robot limits how you can emote, but Scott was hilarious. He took those boundaries and was able to shape the language in a way that makes you feel Baymax's emotion and sense of humor. Scott was able to relay just how much Baymax cares".
- Jamie Chung as Go Go Tomago, a tough and athletic student who specializes in electromagnetics. Hall said "She's definitely a woman of few words. We looked at bicycle messengers as inspiration for her character".
- T.J. Miller as Frederick Flamarian "Fred" Frederickson IV, a comic book fan and slacker who serves as a team mascot at the San Fransokyo Institute of Technology. In regards to Miller, co-director Chris Williams said "He's a real student of comedy. There are a lot of layers to his performance, so Fred ended up becoming a richer character than anyone expected", both literally and metaphorically.
- Damon Wayans Jr. as Wasabi, a smart and slightly neurotic youth who specializes in lasers. On the character, Williams said "He's actually the most conservative, cautious—he [sic] the most normal among a group of brazen characters. So he really grounds the movie in the second act and becomes, in a way, the voice of the audience and points out that what they're doing is crazy".
- Genesis Rodriguez as Honey Lemon, a chemistry enthusiast at the San Fransokyo Institute of Technology. Williams said, "She's a glass-is-half-full kind of person. But she has this mad-scientist quality with a twinkle in her eye – there's more to Honey than it seems". Rodriguez reprised her role in the Latin American Spanish dub of the film.
- James Cromwell as Professor Robert Callaghan / Yokai, the head of a robotics program at the San Fransokyo Institute of Technology who becomes an extremely powerful masked supervillain to take revenge on Krei.
- Alan Tudyk as Alistair Krei, a pioneer entrepreneur, tech guru and the CEO of Krei Tech.
- Daniel Henney as Tadashi Hamada, Hiro's elder brother and Baymax's creator. On Tadashi and Hiro's relationship, Conli said "We really wanted them to be brothers first. Tadashi is a smart mentor. He very subtly introduces Hiro to his friends and what they do at San Fransokyo Tech. Once Hiro sees Wasabi, Honey, Go Go, and Fred in action, he realizes that there's a much bigger world out there that really interests him".
- Maya Rudolph as Cass, Hiro and Tadashi's maternal aunt and guardian.
- Katie Lowes as Abigail Callaghan, Callaghan's daughter and a test pilot for Krei Tech.
- Daniel Gerson as Desk Sergeant Gerson, the desk sergeant for the San Fransokyo Police Department.
- Paul Briggs as Yama, a gangster who seeks revenge on Hiro after his robot is defeated in a clandestine fight with illegal betting.
- David Shaughnessy as Heathcliff, Fred's family butler.
- Billy Bush as a newscaster
- Stan Lee as Fred's father, who appears during the tour of Fred's home in a family portrait and briefly appears in the film's post-credits scene where it is revealed that he was once a superhero.

== Production ==
Don Hall, Kristina Reed and the entire crew are such amazingly talented people and have such a love for all things Marvel that it's been an absolute blast working with them. They've really taken the Big Hero 6 property, which at the end of the day doesn't have a lot of publishing history behind it, and built an entire world and mythology around it. The amount of research Don and his crew have done is exhaustive and beyond thorough, and I don't just mean with respect to reading the comics. From the design of the characters and their tech to the look of the world, no stone has been left unturned and a lot of frequent flyer miles have been tallied up to get where they are at this juncture. These guys have traveled the globe to make Big Hero 6 the very best it can be. It's a tribute to how John Lasseter runs the animation division[.]

— Then Marvel Entertainment chief creative officer Joe Quesada, praising Walt Disney Animation Studios on their reinvention of Big Hero 6.

After the Walt Disney Company's acquisition of Marvel Entertainment in 2009, CEO Bob Iger encouraged the company's divisions to explore Marvel's properties for adaptation concepts. By deliberately picking an obscure title, it would give them the freedom to come up with their own version. While directing Winnie the Pooh (2011), director Don Hall was scrolling through a Marvel database when he stumbled upon Big Hero 6, a comic he had never heard of before. "I just liked the title," he said. He pitched the concept to John Lasseter in 2011, as one of five ideas for possible productions for Walt Disney Animation Studios, and this particular idea "struck a chord" with Lasseter, Hall and Chris Williams.

In June 2012, Disney confirmed that Walt Disney Animation Studios was adapting Marvel Comics' series and that the film had been commissioned into early stages of development. Because they wanted the concept to feel new and fresh, head of story Paul Briggs (who also voices Yama in the film) only read a few issues of the comic, while screenwriter Robert L. Baird admitted he had not read the comic at all.

Big Hero 6 was produced solely by Walt Disney Animation Studios, although several members of Marvel's creative team were involved in the film's production including Joe Quesada, Marvel's chief creative officer, and Jeph Loeb, head of Marvel Television. According to an interview with Axel Alonso by Comic Book Resources, Marvel did not have any plans to publish a tie-in comic. Disney planned to reprint the Marvel version of Big Hero 6 themselves, but reportedly Marvel disagreed. They eventually came to agreement that Yen Press would publish the Japanese manga version of Big Hero 6 for Disney.

Conversely, Lasseter dismissed the idea of a rift between the two companies, and producer Roy Conli stated that Marvel allowed Disney "complete freedom in structuring the story". Disney Animation Studio President Andrew Millstein stated: "Hero is one example of what we've learned over the years and our embracing some of the Pixar DNA." Regarding the film's story, Quesada stated, "The relationship between Hiro and his robot has a very Disney flavor to it ... but it's combined with these Marvel heroic arcs." The production team decided early on not to connect the film to the Marvel Cinematic Universe and instead set the film in a stand-alone universe.

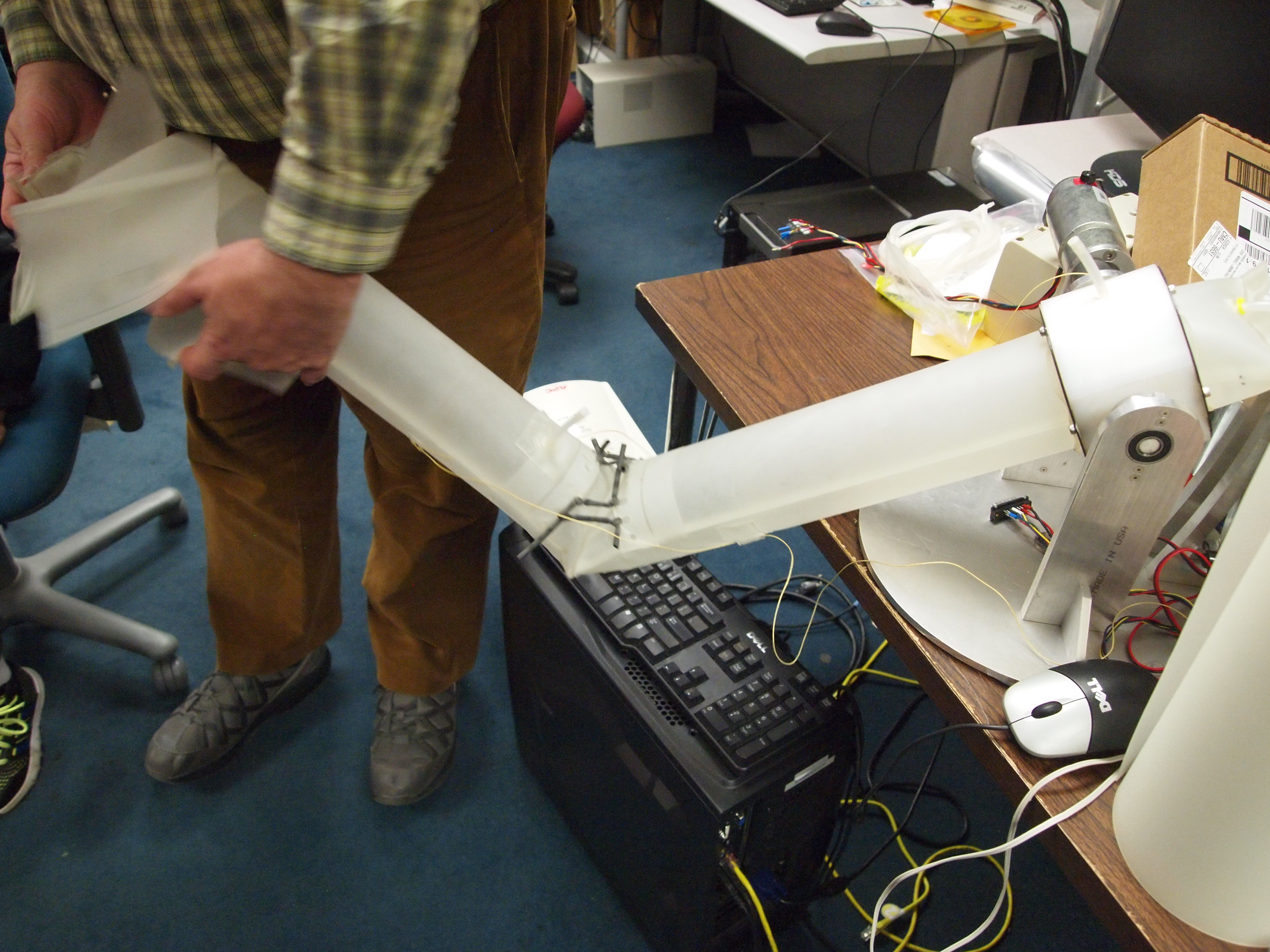
An inflatable vinyl robotic arm that helped inspire Baymax's design, from the researchers in the new field of soft robotics at Carnegie Mellon University's Robotics Institute.

With respect to the design of Baymax, Hall mentioned in an interview, "I wanted a robot that we had never seen before and something to be wholly original. That's a tough thing to do, we've got a lot of robots in pop culture, everything from The Terminator to WALL-E to C-3PO on down the line and not to mention Japanese robots, I won't go into that. So I wanted to do something original." Even if they did not yet know what the robot should look like, artist Lisa Keene came up with the idea that it should be a huggable robot. Other sources of inspiration cited by the team include Japanese anime, such as Hayao Miyazaki films, including Spirited Away (2001) and The Wind Rises (2013), and Pokémon, as well as Shogun Warriors toys. Mecha designer Shigeto Koyama, who previously did design work for mecha anime such as Gunbuster 2, Eureka Seven, Gurren Lagann, and Rebuild of Evangelion, worked on the concept design for Baymax.

Early on in the development process, Hall and the design team took a research trip to Carnegie Mellon University's Robotics Institute, where they met a team of DARPA-funded researchers who were pioneering the new field of 'soft robotics' using inflatable vinyl, which ultimately inspired Baymax's inflatable, vinyl, truly huggable design. Hall stated that "I met a researcher (Chris Atkeson) who was working on soft robots. ... It was an inflatable vinyl arm and the practical app would be in the healthcare industry as a nurse or doctor's assistant. He had me at vinyl. This particular researcher went into this long pitch but the minute he showed me that inflatable arm, I knew we had our huggable robot." Hall stated that the technology "will have potential probably in the medical industry in the future, making robots that are very pliable and gentle and not going to hurt people when they pick them up."

Hall mentioned that achieving a unique look for the mechanical armor took some time and "just trying to get something that felt like the personality of the character" Williams stated, "A big part of the design challenge is when he puts on the armor you want to feel that he's a very powerful intimidating presence ... at the same time, design-wise he has to relate to the really adorable simple vinyl robot underneath." Baymax's face design was inspired by a copper suzu bell that Hall noticed while at a Shinto shrine.

According to Conli, Lasseter initially disliked Baymax's description (while low on battery power) of Hiro's cat as a "hairy baby", but Williams kept the line in anyway, and at the film's first test screening, Lasseter admitted that Williams was correct.

According to Williams, Baymax was originally going to be introduced rather late in the film, but then story artist John Ripa conceived of a way for Baymax to meet Hiro much earlier. The entire film became much stronger by establishing the relationship between Hiro and Baymax early on, but the filmmakers ended up having to reconstruct "a fair amount of the first act" in order to make that idea work.

About ninety animators worked on the film at one point or another; some worked on the project for as long as two years. In terms of the film's animation style and settings, the film combines Eastern world culture (predominantly Japanese) with Western world culture (predominantly California). In May 2013, Disney released concept art and rendered footage of San Fransokyo from the film. San Fransokyo, the futuristic mashup of San Francisco and Tokyo, was described by Hall as "an alternate version of San Francisco. Most of the technology is advanced, but much of it feels retro … Where Hiro lives, it feels like the Haight. I love the Painted ladies. We gave them a Japanese makeover; we put a cafe on the bottom of one. They live above a coffee shop." The house that Hiro's family lives in is based on a Victorian house at the corner of Haight Street and Masonic Avenue in the Haight-Ashbury. According to production designer Paul Felix, "The topography is exaggerated because what we do is caricature, I think the hills are 1 1/2 times exaggerated. I don't think you could really walk up them ... When you get to the downtown area, that's when you get the most Tokyo-fied, that pure, layered, dense kind of feeling of the commercial district there. When you get out of there, it becomes more San Francisco with the Japanese aesthetic. … (It's a bit like) Blade Runner (1982), but contained to a few square blocks. You see the skyscrapers contrasted with the hills."

The reason why Disney wanted to merge Tokyo (which is where the comic book version takes place) with San Francisco was partly because San Francisco had not been used by Marvel before, partly because of all the city's iconic aspects, and partly because they felt its aesthetics would blend well with Tokyo. The filmmakers' idea was that San Fransokyo is based on an alternative history in which San Francisco was largely rebuilt by Japanese immigrants in the aftermath of the 1906 earthquake, although this premise is not stated in the film.

To create San Fransokyo as a detailed digital simulation of an entire city, Disney purchased the actual assessor data for the entire city and county of San Francisco. The final city contains over 83,000 buildings and 100,000 vehicles.

A software program called Denizen was used to create over 700 distinctive characters that populate the city. Another one named Bonzai was responsible for the creation of the city's 250,000 trees, while a new rendering system called Hyperion offered new illumination possibilities, like light shining through a translucent object (e.g. Baymax's vinyl covering). Pixar's RenderMan was considered as a "Plan B" for the film's rendering, if Hyperion was not able to meet production deadlines.

Development on Hyperion started in 2011 and was based upon research into multi-bounce complex global illumination originally conducted at Disney Research in Zürich. Disney, in turn, had to assemble a new super-computing cluster just to handle Hyperion's immense processing demands, which consists of over 2,300 Linux workstations distributed across four data centers (three in Los Angeles and one in San Francisco). Each workstation, as of 2014, included a pair of 2.4 GHz Intel Xeon processors, 256 GB of memory, and a pair of 300 GB solid-state drives configured as a RAID Level 0 array (i.e., to operate as a single 600 GB drive). This was all backed by a central storage system with a capacity of five petabytes, which holds all digital assets as well as archival copies of all 54 Disney Animation films. Cinematographer Robert Richardson was brought on as a visual consultant to assist in the creation of realistic lighting.

The emotional climax takes place in the middle of a wormhole portal, which is represented by the stylized interior of a mandelbulb.

The post-credits scene was only added to the film in August 2014, late in production, after Hall and his crew went to see Marvel Studios' Guardians of the Galaxy (2014). He stated that "[i]t horrified us, that people were sat waiting for an end credits thing, because of the Marvel DNA. We didn't want people to leave the movie disappointed."

== Music ==
Henry Jackman composed the score for the film. The soundtrack features an original song titled "Immortals" written and recorded by American rock band Fall Out Boy, which was released by Walt Disney Records on October 14, 2014. The soundtrack album was digitally released by Walt Disney Records on November 4, 2014, and had a CD release on November 25. While not part of the soundtrack, a brief instrumental section of "Eye of the Tiger" plays in the film. For the Japanese release of the album, a previously unreleased English version of Japanese-American singer Ai's single "Story" was released as a single by EMI Records and Walt Disney Records exclusively in Japan. The song was used in promotional videos and the film's credits for the Japanese release.

== Release ==
=== Theatrical ===
Big Hero 6 debuted on October 23, 2014, as the opening film at the Tokyo International Film Festival. The world premiere of Big Hero 6 in 3D took place at the Abu Dhabi Film Festival on October 31, 2014. It was theatrically released in the United States and Canada on November 7, 2014, with limited IMAX international showings. Theatrically, the film was accompanied by the Walt Disney Animation Studios short, Feast.

For the South Korean release of the film, it was retitled Big Hero, to avoid the impression of being a sequel, and edited to remove indications of the characters' Japanese origin. This is owing to the tense relations between Korea and Japan. For instance, the protagonist's name, Hiro Hamada, was changed to "Hero Armada", and Japanese-language signage onscreen was changed to English. Nonetheless, the film caused some online controversy in South Korea, because of small images resembling the Rising Sun Flag in the protagonist's room.

The film was released in China on February 28, 2015. Disney had retained the Japanese elements of the film in mainland China during the pre-release marketing, but used the modified version for the theatrical and Blu-ray/DVD releases as it did in South Korea. The mainland Chinese title of the film is "超能陆战队", which is usually interpreted as "super-power marines"; while the character "陆", which means land, is also six in Chinese numerals, so this title can translate to "super-power 6 sentai" as well.

As part of Disney's 100th anniversary, Big Hero 6 was re-released in Helios theaters across Poland on October 15, 2023.

=== Home media ===
Big Hero 6 was released in the United States by Walt Disney Studios Home Entertainment on Blu-ray and DVD on February 24, 2015. Writer Steven T. Seagle, who co-created the comic book Big Hero 6, criticized the Blu-ray featurette documenting the origins of the group, for not mentioning him or co-creator Duncan Rouleau. Seagle also criticized the book Art of Big Hero 6 for the same omission. Big Hero 6 was released in 4K Blu-ray on November 5, 2019.

In the United States, the film grossed $102 million from Blu-ray and DVD sales as of April 2022. It was the fourth best-selling title of 2015 with 5.1 million units sold. In the United Kingdom, it was watched by 9.6 million viewers on television in 2017, making it the year's second most-watched film on UK television.

== Reception ==
=== Box office ===
Big Hero 6 earned $222.5 million in North America and $449.6 million in other territories for a worldwide estimated total of $672.1 million. Calculating in all expenses, Deadline Hollywood estimated that the film made a profit of $187.34 million. Worldwide, it is the highest-grossing animated film of 2014, and one of the highest-grossing animated films of all time. By grossing over $500 million worldwide, it became the fourth Disney release of 2014 to do so; the other titles being Guardians of the Galaxy, Maleficent, and Captain America: The Winter Soldier.

==== North America ====
In the U.S. and Canada, the film is the second-highest-grossing science-fiction animated film (behind 2008's WALL-E), the third-highest-grossing animated superhero comedy film (behind 2004's The Incredibles and 2018's Incredibles 2), and the fifth-highest-grossing Disney animated film. The film earned $1.4 million from late Thursday night showings, which is higher than the previews earned by Frozen ($1.2 million) and The Lego Movie ($400,000). In its opening day on November 7, the film earned $15.8 million, debuting at number two behind Interstellar ($16.9 million). Big Hero 6 topped the box office in its opening weekend, earning $56.2 million from 3,761 theaters ahead of Interstellar ($47.5 million); at the time it was Walt Disney Animation Studios' second-best opening behind Frozen ($67.4 million), both adjusted and unadjusted.

On February 15, 2015, Big Hero 6 became the third-highest-grossing Disney animated film in both the U.S. and Canada, behind The Lion King and Frozen.

==== Outside North America ====
Two weeks ahead of its North American release, Big Hero 6 was released in Russia (earned $4.8 million) and Ukraine (earned $0.2 million) in two days (October 25–26). The main reason behind the early release was in order to take advantage of the two weeks of school holidays in Russia. Jeff Bock, box office analyst for Exhibitor Relations, said "For a two-day gross, that's huge. It's a giant number in Russia." In its second weekend, the film added $4.8 million (up 1%) bringing its total nine-day cumulative audience to $10.3 million in Russia and $10.9 including its revenue from Ukraine.

In its opening weekend, the film earned $7.6 million from seventeen markets for a first weekend worldwide total of $79.2 million, behind Interstellar ($132.2 million). It went to number one in the Philippines, Vietnam, and Indonesia. It opened with $4.8 million in Mexico. In Japan, where the film is locally known as Baymax, it opened at second place behind Yo-Kai Watch: Tanjō no Himitsu da Nyan!, with $5.3 million, marking it the second-biggest Disney opening in Japan behind Frozen. and topped the box office for six consecutive weekends. The film opened in second place with $6 million ($6.8 million including previews) in the U.K., which is 15% lower than Frozen. It opened at No. 1 with $14.8 million in China, which is the biggest opening for a Disney and Pixar animated film (breaking Frozen's record) and topped the box office for three consecutive weekends.

The film became the highest-grossing Disney animated film in Vietnam and in China (surpassed by Zootopia)), the second-highest-grossing Disney animated film of all time in Russia, in the Philippines (behind Toy Story 3), and in Japan (behind Frozen). In addition to being the second-highest-grossing Disney animated film, it is also the fifth-highest-grossing animated film of all time in China. In total earnings, its biggest markets outside of the United States and Canada are China ($83.5 million) and Japan ($76 million).

=== Critical response ===
Big Hero 6 received positive reviews upon release. Review aggregation website Rotten Tomatoes reports an approval rating of 90% based on 229 reviews and an average rating of 7.4/10. The site's consensus states: "Agreeably entertaining and brilliantly animated, Big Hero 6 is briskly-paced, action-packed, and often touching." Metacritic, which assigns a normalized rating out of 100 from top reviews from mainstream critics, has calculated a score of 74 based on 38 reviews, indicating "generally favorable" reviews. Audiences polled by CinemaScore gave the film an average grade of "A" on an A+ to F scale.

Michael O'Sullivan of The Washington Post gave the film 3.5/4 stars, writing that "The real appeal of Big Hero 6 isn't its action. It's the central character's heart." Maricar Estrella of Fort Worth Star-Telegram gave the film 5 stars, saying it "offers something for everyone: action, camaraderie, superheroes and villains. But mostly, Baymax offers a compassionate and healing voice for those suffering, and a hug that can be felt through the screen." Peter Travers of Rolling Stone gave the film 3 out of 4 stars, stating, "The breakthrough star of the season is here. His name is Baymax and he's impossible not to love. The 3-D animated Big Hero 6 would be a ton less fun without this irresistible blob of roly-poly, robot charisma." Kofi Outlaw of Screen Rant gave the film 4 out of 5 stars or "excellent", explaining that "Big Hero 6 combines Disney wonder and charm with Marvel awe and action to deliver a film that exhibits the best of both studios." Alonso Duralde of The Wrap gave the film a positive review, calling it "sweet and sharp and exciting and hilarious" and says that the film "comes to the rescue of what's become a dreaded movie trope—the origin story—and launches the superhero tale to pleasurable new heights." Calvin Wilson of St. Louis Post-Dispatch gave the film 3.5 of 4 stars, writing that "the storytelling is solid, propelled by characters that you come to care about. And that should make Big Hero 6 a big hit."

Bill Goodykoontz of The Arizona Republic gave the film a positive review, writing, "Directors Don Hall and Chris Williams have made a terrific movie about a boy (Ryan Potter) and his robot friend, who seek answers to a deadly tragedy," calling it an "unexpectedly good treat". Soren Anderson of The Seattle Times gave the film 3.5 out of 4 stars, saying that "Clever, colorful, fast on its feet, frequently very funny and sweet (but not excessively so), Big Hero 6 mixes its myriad influences into a final product that, while in no way original, is immensely entertaining." Michael Rechtshaffen of The Hollywood Reporter gave the film a positive review, saying that "the funny and heartwarming story about the bond between a teen tech geek and a gentle robot represents another can't-miss proposition by Walt Disney Animation Studios." Jon Niccum of The Kansas City Star gave the film 3.5 out of four stars, writing that while it "may hit a few familiar beats inherent to any superhero 'origin story,'" it is still "the best animated film of the year, supplying The Incredibles-size adventure with a level of emotional bonding not seen since The Iron Giant", and that it "never runs low on battery power". Elizabeth Weitzman of the Daily News gave the film 4 out of 5 stars, calling it a "charming animated adventure", saying that with "appealing 3D animation" and a smart and "sharp story and script", it is "one of the rare family films that can fairly boast of having it all: humor, heart and huggability". Rafer Guzmán from Newsday gave the film 3 out of 4 stars, saying that "Marvel plus Disney plus John Lasseter equals an enjoyable jumble of kid-approved action", with "rich, vivid colors and filled with clever details".

=== Accolades ===
Accolades received by Big Hero 6 (film)
Award	Date of ceremony	Category	Recipient(s)	Result	Ref.
Academy Awards	February 22, 2015	Best Animated Feature	Don Hall, Chris Williams, and Roy Conli	Won	
American Cinema Editors Awards	January 30, 2015	Best Edited Animated Feature Film	Tim Mertens	Nominated	
Annie Awards	January 31, 2015	Best Animated Feature	Big Hero 6	Nominated	
Annie Awards	January 31, 2015	Animated Effects in an Animated Production	Michael Kaschalk, Peter DeMund, David Hutchins, Henrik Falt, John Kosnik	Won	
Annie Awards	January 31, 2015	Character Design in an Animated Feature Production	Shiyoon Kim, Jin Kim	Nominated	
Annie Awards	January 31, 2015	Directing in an Animated Feature Production	Don Hall & Chris Williams	Nominated	
Annie Awards	January 31, 2015	Storyboarding in an Animated Feature Production	Marc E. Smith	Nominated	
Annie Awards	January 31, 2015	Writing in an Animated Feature Production	Robert L. Baird, Daniel Gerson & Jordan Roberts	Nominated	
Annie Awards	January 31, 2015	Editorial in an Animated Feature Production	Tim Mertens	Nominated	
Black Reel Awards	February 19, 2015	Outstanding Voice Performance	Maya Rudolph	Nominated	
Black Reel Awards	February 19, 2015	Outstanding Voice Performance	Damon Wayans Jr.	Nominated	
British Academy Children's Awards	November 22, 2015	Kid's Vote — Film	Big Hero 6	Nominated	
British Academy Children's Awards	November 22, 2015	Feature Film	Roy Conli, Chris Williams, and Don Hall	Nominated	
British Academy Film Awards	February 8, 2015	Best Animated Film	Big Hero 6	Nominated	
Cinema Audio Society Awards	February 14, 2015	Outstanding Achievement in Sound Mixing for a Motion Picture – Animated	Gabriel Guy, David E. Fluhr, Alan Meyerson, and Mary Jo Lang	Won	
Columbus Film Critics Association Awards	January 8, 2015	Best Animated Feature	Big Hero 6	Runner-up	
Critics' Choice Movie Awards	January 15, 2015	Best Animated Film	Big Hero 6	Nominated	
Golden Globe Awards	January 11, 2015	Best Animated Feature Film	Big Hero 6	Nominated	
Golden Trailer Awards	May 6, 2015	Best Animation/Family	"Find Your Way" (Trailer Park, Inc.)	Won	
Golden Trailer Awards	May 6, 2015	Best Animation/Family TV Spot	"Your Way" (Trailer Park, Inc.)	Won	
Golden Trailer Awards	May 6, 2015	Best Original Score TV Spot	"Awards Digital Ad" (Trailer Park, Inc.)	Nominated	
Golden Trailer Awards	May 6, 2015	Best Original Score TV Spot	"Breakthrough Immortals MVO" (Trailer Park, Inc.)	Nominated	
Golden Trailer Awards	May 6, 2015	Best Pre-Show Theatrical Advertising for a Brand	"Bowtie" (Trailer Park, Inc.)	Won	
Nickelodeon Kids' Choice Awards	March 28, 2015	Favorite Animated Movie	Big Hero 6	Won	
Producers Guild of America Awards	January 24, 2015	Best Animated Motion Picture	Roy Conli	Nominated	
Satellite Awards	February 15, 2015	Best Motion Picture Animated or Mixed Media	Big Hero 6	Nominated	
Visual Effects Society Awards	February 4, 2015	Outstanding Animation in an Animated Feature Motion Picture	Don Hall, Chris Williams, Roy Conli, Zach Parrish	Won	
Visual Effects Society Awards	February 4, 2015	Outstanding Models in any Motion Media Project	Brett Achorn, Minh Duong, Scott Watanabe, Larry Wu	Won	
Visual Effects Society Awards	February 4, 2015	Outstanding Created Environment in an Animated Feature Motion Picture	Ralf Habel, David Hutchins, Michael Kaschalk, Olun Riley	Won	
Visual Effects Society Awards	February 4, 2015	Outstanding Effects Simulations in an Animated Feature Motion Picture	Henrik Falt, David Hutchins, Michael Kaschalk, John Kosnik	Won	
Visual Effects Society Awards	February 4, 2015	Outstanding Animated Character in an Animated Feature Motion Picture	Colin Eckart, John Kahwaty, Zach Parrish, Zack Petroc	Won	

== Other media ==
=== Possible sequel ===
On February 18, 2015, the film's directors, Don Hall and Chris Williams, said a sequel was possible. Hall added, "Having said that, of course, we love these characters, and the thought of working with them again some day definitely has its benefits." In March 2015, Genesis Rodriguez told MTV that a sequel was being considered, saying, "…There's nothing definitive. There's talks of something happening. We just don't know what yet." In April 2015, Stan Lee mentioned a projected sequel as one of several that he understood were in Marvel's plans for upcoming films. In March 2021, head animator Zach Parrish expressed a desire for a sequel, "There have definitely been stories told beyond... I think there's still a lot of potential. There's still plenty of time. The beauty of animation is that can pick up the story at the very end of Big Hero, or we could jump in time. We could go wherever we want, since it's animation."

=== Television series ===
- In March 2016, Disney announced that a Big Hero 6 television series was in development and premiered on Disney Channel and Disney XD in 2017. Big Hero 6: The Series, produced by Disney Television Animation, takes place immediately after the events of the film, is created and executive produced by Kim Possible's Mark McCorkle and Bob Schooley, and is co-executive produced by Nick Filippi. The majority of the cast from the film returned to voice the characters, except for Wayans Jr. and Miller.
- In December 2020, Disney announced a new Disney+ series titled Baymax!, which would follow Baymax working as a nurse around San Fransokyo. The series, produced by Walt Disney Animation Studios, premiered on June 29, 2022.

=== Comics ===
- A Japanese manga adaptation of Big Hero 6 (which is titled Baymax (ベイマックス, Beimakkusu) in Japan), illustrated by Haruki Ueno, began serialization in Kodansha's Magazine Special from August 20, 2014. A prologue chapter was published in Weekly Shōnen Magazine on August 6, 2014. According to the film's official Japanese website, the manga revealed plot details in Japan before anywhere else in the world. The website also quoted the film's co-director Don Hall, to whom it referred as a manga fan, as saying that the film was Japanese-inspired. Yen Press published the series in English.
- It was announced that IDW Publishing would adapt the Disney version of Big Hero 6 into an ongoing comic. This marked one of the few times where Marvel Comics loaned out one of its properties to another comic publishing company. The series was intended to debut in July 2018 with Hannah Blumenreich writing and Nicoletta Baldari doing the art. The release of the first issue was later pushed to September 19, 2018, before getting pushed back to April 2019 and now titled after the television series.
- A manhwa adaptation of several episodes of Big Hero 6: The Series was released in August 2021. Published by Yen Press, the series is written by JuYoun Lee and illustrated by Hong Gyun An.

=== Video games ===
- A video game based on the film titled Big Hero 6: Battle in the Bay was released on October 28, 2014 for the Nintendo 3DS and Nintendo DS. This game is set after the events of the film and is a side-scrolling beat 'em up game. Four of the six members are playable (with Baymax and Honey Lemon being non-playable), and the Touch Screen can be used to launch Honey Lemon's grenades in the heat of battle. This was the last game released for the original Nintendo DS. A Disney Two Pack was later released containing both this game and Disney Frozen: Olaf's Quest on one cartridge.
- Hiro and Baymax are available in Disney Infinity 2.0 as playable Disney Originals characters in the Toy Box. As with the other playable characters in the games, tie-in figures for them were also released.
- A mobile game based on the film titled Big Hero 6: Bot Fight was released on November 3, 2014. It takes place a year after the events of the film, where the heroes discover and battle runaway robots via match-3 battles. The game was discontinued on February 3, 2016 due to the constraints of Disney Mobile's support team and the need to discontinue old games to release new ones.
- The six members of Big Hero 6 and Yokai appear as playable characters, along with other material based on the film, in the world builder video game Disney Magic Kingdoms. In the game, the characters are involved in new storylines that serve as a continuation of the events of the film.
- San Fransokyo, a world based on Big Hero 6, appears in Kingdom Hearts III. The world continues the story from the events at the end of the film, with Organization XIII taking control of Baymax's original body that was left behind in the portal space, turning it into an enemy that Baymax and Sora fight. The cast of the film reprise their roles as the members of Big Hero 6, with the exception of Wayans.
- The video game Disney Mirrorverse includes alternate versions of Hiro and Baymax as playable characters.
- Baymax is featured as a Battle Pass character in Fortnite Chapter 6 Season 1: 鬼 Hunters.
- Season 13 of Disney Speedstorm is themed after Big Hero 6, featuring Hiro, Baymax, and Honey Lemon as playable racers and a racing environment set in San Fransokyo.

=== Toys ===
Vinyl toy company Funko released the first images of the toy figures via their Big Hero 6 Funko. The POP Vinyl series collection features Hiro Hamada, Go Go Tomago, Wasabi, Honey Lemon, Fred, and a 6-inch Baymax.

Bandai released a number of action figures related to the film; these toys including a number of different Baymax figures. One is a soft plastic 10-inch version that includes a series of projected stills from the film on his stomach, which can be changed when the figure's arm is moved, and which emits accompanying sounds. Deluxe Flying Baymax, which retails for $39.99, depicts the armored version of the character and features lights and sounds that activate at the push of a button. Placing the Hiro figurine on his back changes the sounds into speech and when the figure is tilted, the sounds are those of flying. The Armor-Up Baymax (original retail cost $19.99) comes with 20 pieces of armor that can be assembled onto the robot by the owner. The other characters from the film, including the other members of team and Professor Callaghan (who is called Yokai) are issued in 4-inch action figures, each of which have eight points of articulation.

=== Theme park attractions ===
- The Happy Ride with Baymax, a rotating car ride, opened in September 2020 at Tokyo Disneyland.
- San Fransokyo Square, a themed area based on the film's setting, debuted at Disney California Adventure in late August 2023.

=== Other media appearances ===
- Hiro and Baymax have cameo appearances in the 2018 film Ralph Breaks the Internet, with Scott Adsit reprising the role of Baymax.
- In The Simpsons 2021 short Plusaversary, Baymax is one of the guests at the party in Moe's Tavern.
- The characters of the film have cameo appearances in the 2023 short film Once Upon a Studio, where Scott Adsit reprises the role of Baymax.
