= Daniel Henney =

American actor (born 1979)

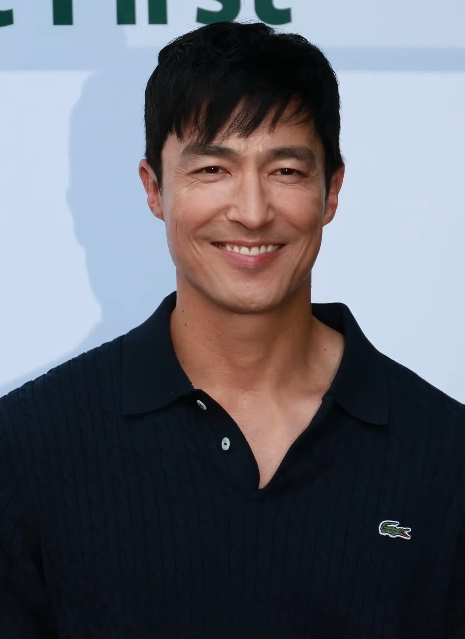
- Henney in May 2024
- Born: Daniel Philip Henney; November 28, 1979 (age 46); Carson City, Michigan, U.S.
- Occupations: Actor; model
- Years active: 2001–present
- Agents: Echo Global Group (South Korea); DNA Model Management (U.S.)
- Known for: Agent Zero in X-Men Origins: Wolverine; Tadashi Hamada in Big Hero 6 Matt Simmons in Criminal Minds; Lan Mandragoran in The Wheel of Time
- Spouse: Ru Kumagai (m. 2023)

Daniel Philip Henney (born November 28, 1979) is an American actor and model. He first came into international prominence with his television debut as Dr. Henry Kim on the Korean drama My Lovely Sam Soon (2005).

He has gone on to star in films such as Seducing Mr. Perfect (2006), My Father (2007), X-Men Origins: Wolverine (2009), Shanghai Calling (2012), The Last Stand (2013), One Night Surprise (2013), and Big Hero 6 (2014). On television, he has starred in the Korean Spring Waltz as well as American television series Hawaii Five-0 and Criminal Minds: Beyond Borders. He joined the regular cast of Criminal Minds for its 13th, 14th and 15th seasons. He starred as Lan Mandragoran in the 2021 television adaptation of The Wheel of Time.

== Early life ==
Henney was born on November 28, 1979 in Carson City, Michigan. His mother Christine Henney, an American adoptee from Busan, South Korea, was a nurse. His father Philip Henney, an American of British descent, worked in a factory. He was a star basketball player at Carson City-Crystal High School and led the Eagles to the MHSAA Central region (CSAA) 2nd-place finish during his senior year in 1998.

Henney attended various colleges—including Albion College, Alma College, and Elgin Community College—but never completed his college studies due to his burgeoning modeling career. He was credited on many online portals for a time to have had graduated with an economics degree from the University of Illinois Chicago. However, that was proven to be false when an academic scandal in 2007 revealed that several South Korean social figures and celebrities, including Henney, Choi Soo-jong and Chang Mi-hee, had falsified academic records.

== Career ==
Henney moved to South Korea after having lived on and off in Hong Kong and Taiwan for four years. While in New York in 2004, he did some Off-Broadway work while auditioning for television shows.

Henney started modeling in the U.S. in 2001 and worked in France, Hong Kong, and many more while attending college. After his debut in South Korea with an advertisement for the Amore Pacific's cosmetic "Odyssey Sunrise", he became a spokesperson for commercials with Jun Ji-hyun for Olympus cameras and Kim Tae-hee for Daewoo Electronics's Klasse air conditioners. Henney is signed with DNA Models in New York under the celebrity division.

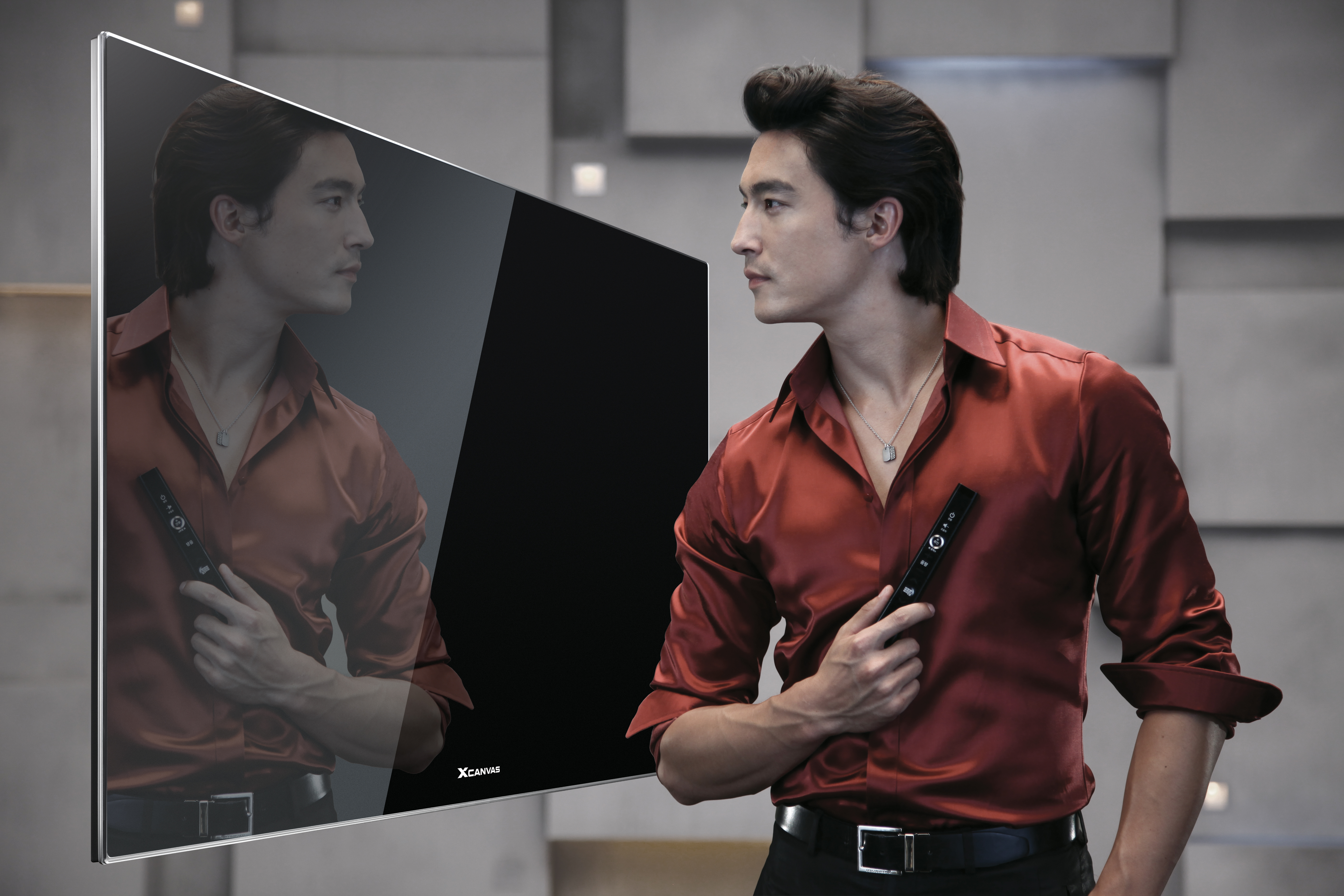
Henney in an LG Border Wireless LED TV advertisement, September 2009

While modelling in South Korea for Olympus in 2005, he was scouted by a talent manager who got Henney a role in the Korean drama My Lovely Sam Soon. Henney, who did not speak any Korean, was cast as an Asian American physician Henry Kim who struggled with the language. He played a supporting role in a love triangle between female lead Hee-jin (Jung Ryeo-won) and restaurateur Hyun Jin-heon (Hyun Bin). The show was widely popular, with over half of South Korean households estimated to have watched the finale. Henney then starred in another romantic drama Spring Waltz as Philip, a foreign music manager, in 2006. He resumed his modeling career when he was featured in a Bean Pole campaign with Gwyneth Paltrow.

Henney made his feature film debut in another romantic comedy Seducing Mr. Perfect (2006), which coincided with pop star and actor Rain's debut in I'm a Cyborg, But That's OK (2006). His second film, My Father, won multiple awards in South Korea and Henney became the first foreigner to sweep all the major cinema awards in the Best New Actor category. He later learned the language and appeared on a few variety shows, such as Family Outing.

His first American role was as Agent Zero in the film X-Men Origins: Wolverine (2009). In the fall season of 2009, he played Dr. David Lee in the CBS television drama Three Rivers.

In 2010, Henney returned to South Korea television for KBS2's The Fugitive: Plan B, alongside Rain and actress Lee Na-young. Since 2012, Henney has appeared in several American TV series. In 2014, Henney voiced Tadashi Hamada in Disney's Big Hero 6.

Henney starred as Special Agent Matt Simmons in the American television series Criminal Minds: Beyond Borders, a spin-off of Criminal Minds, for two seasons from 2016 to 2017. After the Beyond Borders's cancellation, it was announced in June 2017 that Henney's Matt Simmons would continue on Criminal Minds as a series regular for season 13. He remained a part of the cast until the original series concluded in season 15.

In September 2019, Henney was cast in the supporting role of Lan Mandragoran in Amazon Prime Video's adaptation of Robert Jordan's fantasy epic The Wheel of Time.

== Personal life ==
On October 20, 2023, Henney married Ru Kumagai, a Japanese-American actress. The wedding ceremony was held in the United States where only family members attended.

== Filmography ==
=== Film ===
Year	Title	Role	Notes/Ref.
2006	Seducing Mr. Perfect	Robin Heiden	
2007	My Father	James Parker	
2009	X-Men Origins: Wolverine	Agent Zero	
2012	Papa	Music producer	Cameo
2012	Shanghai Calling	Sam Chao	
2013	The Last Stand	Agent Phil Hayes	
2013	One Night Surprise	Bill	
2013	The Spy: Undercover Operation	Ryan	
2014	Big Hero 6	Tadashi Hamada	Voice
2017	Mowgli	Gool	Voice
2019	Money	Roy Lee	Cameo
2022	Confidential Assignment 2: International	Jack	
2023	Missing	Elijah Park	
2024	Dog Days	Daniel	

=== Television ===
Year	Title	Role	Notes
2005	My Lovely Sam Soon	Dr. Henry Kim	Main role
2005	Hello Franceska	Elizabeth's first love	Guest star; 2 episodes
2006	Spring Waltz	Philip	Main role
2009	Three Rivers	Dr. David Lee	Main role; 13 episodes
2010	The Fugitive: Plan B	Kai	Main role
2012–2013	Hawaii Five-0	Michael Noshimuri	Guest star; 3 episodes
2014	Revolution	Peter Garner	Guest star; 3 episodes
2014	NCIS: Los Angeles	NCIS Agent Paul Angelo	Episode: "Three Hearts"
2015–2020	Criminal Minds	Matthew "Matt" Simmons	Special guest (seasons 10 and 12); Main role (seasons 13–15); 49 episodes
2016–2017	Criminal Minds: Beyond Borders	Matthew "Matt" Simmons	Main role; 26 episodes
2016	The Mr. Peabody & Sherman Show	Akashi Shiganosuke	Voice; episode: "Sherman from A to Zzzz/Akashi Shiganosuke"
2016	Dear My Friends	Mark Smith	Cameo
2017–2019	Big Hero 6: The Series	Tadashi Hamada	Voice; 6 episodes
2021–2025	The Wheel of Time	Lan Mandragoran	Main role
2025	Genie, Make a Wish	Kim Gae	Recurring role

== Awards and nominations ==
Award	Year	Category	Works/Recipient	Ref.
MBC Entertainment Awards	2005	Best Dressed	Daniel Henney	
MBC Drama Awards	2005	Best New Actor	My Lovely Sam Soon	
Dong Ah TV's Fashion Award	2006	Best Dressed	Daniel Henney	
27th Korean Association of Film Critics Awards	2007	Best New Actor	My Father	
28th Blue Dragon Film Awards	2007	Best New Actor	My Father	
6th Korean Film Awards	2007	Best New Actor	My Father	
3rd Premiere Rising Star Awards	2007	Best New Actor	My Father	
45th Grand Bell Awards	2008	Best New Actor	My Father	
31st Golden Cinematography Awards	2008	Best New Actor	My Father	
16th Chunsa Film Art Awards	2008	Best New Actor	My Father	
People's Choice Award	2010	Nomination for Favorite On-Screen Team	X-Men Origins: Wolverine	
Newport Beach Film Festival	2012	Outstanding Achievement in Acting	Shanghai Calling	
Shanghai International Film Festival	2012	Best New Actor	Shanghai Calling	
Blue Dragon Film Awards	2022	Popular Star Award	Confidential Assignment 2: International	

== See also ==
- Hines Ward — NFL player of African and Korean descent who brought interest in the sport to South Korea
- Sean Richard Dulake — American actor of Korean and British descent who acted in Korean dramas
