= David Nakayama =

American comics artist

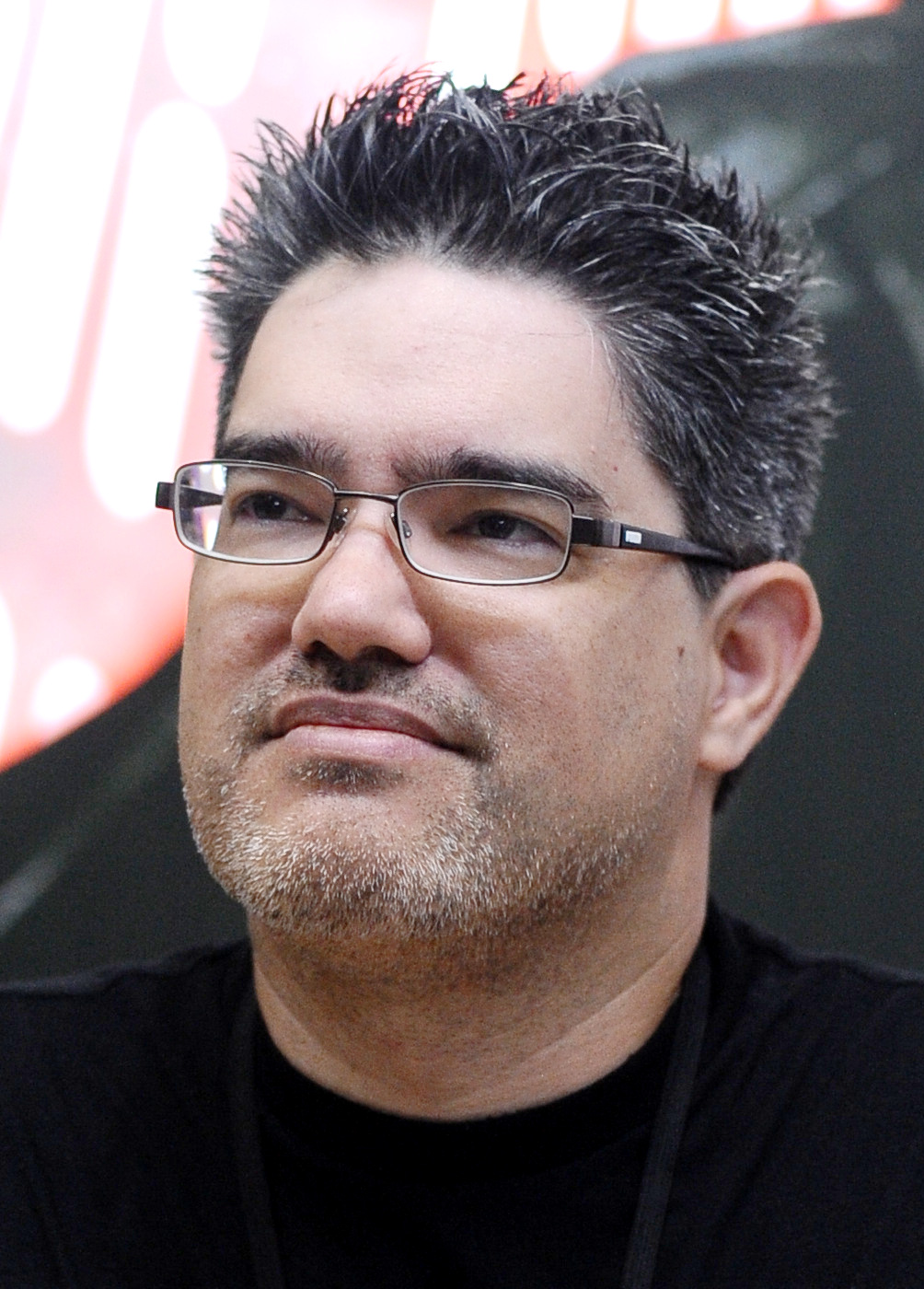
- David Nakayama at the Star Wars Celebration Japan 2025
- Born: August 15, 1978 (age 48); Honolulu, Hawaii, U.S.

David Nakayama (born August 15, 1978) is an American concept artist and comic book artist. After contributed editorial cartoons and comic strips to the school newspaper at Washington University in St. Louis, he studied at the Joe Kubert School under Adam Kubert and Andy Kubert, before breaking into the industry at Top Cow Productions, with books including Proximity Effect, Witchblade, and City of Heroes. He went on to produce work for Marvel Comics and DC Comics, where he has illustrated covers for Batman, Harley Quinn and Wonder Woman.

== Early life ==
David Nakayama was born August 15, 1978 in Honolulu, Hawaii. He began drawing at age three, He developed an interest in comics, and in the idea of producing them professionally, when he was in grade school, after discovering comics with artist Jim Lee's 1990s run on The Uncanny X-Men. He was also influenced by artists such as J. Scott Campbell and Adam Hughes.

As he began to consider this career more seriously, he produced his own amateur books at Kinko's. Nakayama attended college at Washington University in St. Louis, he majored in Illustration, and produced editorial cartoons and comic strips for the school paper. (Note: In the cited Comiccon.con interview at the end of the passage in question, Nakayma mentions that cartoonist Mike Peters went to the same school. Although Nakayama does not explicitly mention Washington University by name, sources confirm that Peters attended that university.) While there, Nakayama was nominated for the Charles M. Schultz Award for Best College Cartoonist. After graduating, he attended the Joe Kubert School in order to improve his comics portfolio, studying under Adam Kubert and Andy Kubert.

== Career ==
While in his second year at the Joe Kubert School, Nakayama was hired by Dark Horse Comics to work on a Star Wars book, which he did while still in school. He has stated that he would have stayed for a third year if he had not obtained work with Top Cow Productions. After winning Wizard magazine's "Be The Next Top Cow Superstar" contest, he left the school and worked in a six-month internship at Top Cow in Los Angeles under the mentorship of founder Marc Silvestri. His first work was the 70-page graphic novel Proximity Effect and he subsequently penciled titles such as Witchblade, City of Heroes, and a City of Heroes Collectible Card Game trading card came published in February 2006.

In 2007 he began doing work for Marvel Comics, including the launch of the series Marvel Adventures: Hulk. He later collaborated with Chris Claremont on a five-issue Big Hero 6 miniseries for that same publisher. Among his cover work for Marvel was the debut issues of Spider-Gwen: Gwen-Verse in 2022.and Spider-Gwen: Smash in 2023. During this time he also produced Red Sonja work for Dynamite Entertainment.

Nakayama spent about 12 years producing work for the gaming industry, during which he discovered digital painting, in particular through the work of South Korean artists, which was a large influence on his work, whose style he views as a mixture of traditional comic book art and modern digital painting.

Among his work for DC Comics were variant covers for Batman #160 (part of the "Hush 2" storyline), Harley Quinn (Vol 4) #51, Wonder Woman (Vol 6) #21, and Peacemaker Presents: The Vigilante/Eagly Double Feature #3, all published in May 2025.

== Selected bibliography ==
=== Video games ===
- War Commander (KIXEYE, October 2012)
- Battle Pirates (KIXEYE, October 2012)
- City of Heroes Freedom (Paragon Studios/NCSoft 2012)
- City of Heroes Going Rogue (Paragon Studios/NCSoft 2010)
- City of Heroes DLC—Issues 14-21 (Paragon Studios/NCSoft 2005-12)

=== Penciler ===
- "The Apprentice" in Star Wars Tales #17 (Dark Horse Comics, October 2003)
- Proximity Effect Graphic Novel (Top Cow, June 2004)
- Witchblade #77 (Top Cow, July 2004)
- City of Heroes #1-3, 5, 7-12, 16 (Top Cow, May 2005-November 2006)
- Revved Graphic Novel (Top Cow, February 2007)
- "Misunderstood" in Marvel Adventures: Iron Man and Hulk #1 (Marvel, May 2007)
- Marvel Adventures: Hulk #1, 3-5, 7, and 8 (Marvel, July 2007-February 2008)
- Marvel Adventures: Spider-man #38 and #40 (Marvel, April and June 2008)
- Marvel Adventures: Fantastic Four #35 (Marvel, April 2008)

=== Cover art ===
- Proximity Effect #1 (online edition) (Top Cow, June 2004)
- Revved #1 (Top Cow, August 2006)
- City of Heroes 15-20 (Top Cow, October 2006-March 2007)
- Marvel Adventures: Iron Man and Hulk #1 (Marvel, May 2007)
- Marvel Adventures: Hulk #4 (Marvel, October 2007)
- Marvel Adventures: Hulk Digest vol.1, 'Misunderstood Monster' (Marvel, November 2007)
- Sheena #5 (Devil's Due, February 2008)
- Marvel Adventures: Spider-Man #36 (Marvel, February 2008)
- Return to Wonderland #2--reprint edition (Zenescope, March 2008)
- Hack/Slash #10 (Devil's Due, March 2008)
- Marvel Adventures: Hulk Digest vol.2, 'Defenders' (Marvel, April 2008)
- Marvel Adventures: Spider-man Digest vol.2, 'Fiercest Foes' (Marvel, April 2008)
- Grimm Fairy Tales #26—New York Comic-con exclusive (Zenescope, April 2008)
- Grimm Fairy Tales #27 (Zenescope, May 2008)
- Marvel Adventures: Hulk #12 (Marvel, April 2008)
- Beyond Wonderland #0--Emerald City Comicon exclusive (Zenescope, May 2008)
- Sinbad #1--Wizardworld Philadelphia exclusive (Zenescope, May 2008)
- 3001: A Laced Odyssey Hip Hop album by Flatbush Zombies (Electric KoolAde Records, March 2016)
- Deadpool Annual #2 (Marvel, 21 May 2014)
