= Skaaren =

Skaaren is a surname. Notable people with the surname include:

- Martin Skaaren (1905–1999), Norwegian politician
- Warren Skaaren (1946–1990), American screenwriter and film producer
