= Cinelou Films =

American film production and distribution company

- Industry: Entertainment
- Founded: 2014
- Founder: Courtney Solomon
- Headquarters: Los Angeles, California, U.S.
- Key people: Courtney Solomon; Stephanie Caleb
- Products: Motion pictures
- Divisions: Cinelou Releasing
- Website: www.cinelou.com

Cinelou Films is an American film production and distribution company founded by Courtney Solomon in 2014. The company's first release was Cake (2014), starring Jennifer Aniston.

== Background ==
In 2014, Courtney Solomon launched a production company titled Cinelou Films. In October 2014, it was announced that the company would be launching a distribution division titled Cinelou Releasing, and its first film would be the drama film Cake, directed by Daniel Barnz and starring Jennifer Aniston. Cinelou's sophomore film was the Eddie Murphy-starring drama film Mr. Church, directed by Bruce Beresford. In 2016, the company produced the adventure comedy-drama film Burn Your Maps (2016), directed by Jordan Roberts and starring Vera Farmiga. and The Comedian, in development for a number of years, directed by Taylor Hackford and starring Robert De Niro.

Cinelou signed a deal with Warner Bros. to distribute their next six films internationally.

Cinelou also produced the film adaptation of the war drama novel The Yellow Birds, directed by Alexandre Moors and starring Alden Ehrenreich, Tye Sheridan, Jack Huston and Jennifer Aniston. The film premiered at Sundance in January 2017.

== Filmography ==
| Year | Title | Director | Box office | Notes |
|---|---|---|---|---|
| December 31, 2014 | Cake | Daniel Barnz | $2.9 million | |
| September 16, 2016 | Mr. Church | Bruce Beresford | $685,780 | co-distribution with Eddie Murphy Productions |
| December 9, 2016 | The Comedian | Taylor Hackford | $1.7 million | co-distribution with Sony Pictures Classics |
| April 21, 2017 | Phoenix Forgotten | Justin Barber | $3.7 million | |
| June 15, 2018 | The Yellow Birds | Alexandre Moors | $57,946 | distributed by Saban Films and DirecTV Cinema |
| June 21, 2019 | Burn Your Maps | Jordan Roberts | | distributed by Vertical Entertainment |
| August 15, 2025 | Red Sonja | M. J. Bassett | $130,912 | distributed by Signature Entertainment |
