= Jordan Roberts (writer) =

American screenwriter and film director (born 1957)

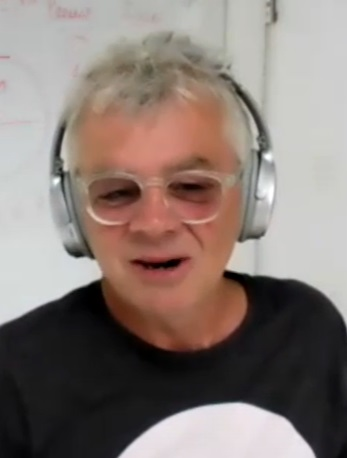
- Roberts in 2021
- Born: June 19, 1957 (age 68)
- Occupations: Screenwriter; director
- Years active: 1997–present
- Spouse: Marianne Roberts
- Children: 2
- Mother: Bobbi Jordan

Jordan Roberts (born Bruce Robert Jordan; June 19, 1957) is an American screenwriter and film director, known for co-writing the screenplays for the Academy Award-winning animated Disney film Big Hero 6 (2014), for which he was nominated for the Annie Award for Writing in a Feature Production. He also wrote and directed Around the Bend (2004), 3,2,1... Frankie Go Boom (2012), and Burn Your Maps (2016).

== Personal life ==
Roberts is the son of actress Roberta "Bobbi" Jordan (née Barlett; 1937–2012) and screenwriter and film producer Robert Samuel Jordan, who left the family when Roberts was 3 years old. His stepfather was television screenwriter William "Bill" Jacobson (1919–2011), whom his mother married on October 23, 1968. Roberts had one brother, Scott Jordan, who died in the 1980s of a heroin overdose, and one older stepsister, Jessie Jacobson. Roberts married Marianne Roberts in 1991. They have a son, Cameron Roberts. Roberts also has a nephew, Brandon Jordan.

== Career ==
In 1997, Roberts wrote the script for the comedy film The Debtors, directed by Evi Quaid and starring Michael Caine. However, The Debtors remains unreleased due to legal troubles with the director and her husband, Randy Quaid, who co-starred in the film. Roberts is known for writing and directing the road movie Around the Bend (2004), and the comedy film 3,2,1... Frankie Go Boom (2012).

In 2005, Roberts wrote the narration for the U.S. version of the French documentary March of the Penguins, which won the Academy Award for Best Documentary Feature, and for which Roberts was nominated for the Writers Guild of America Award for Best Documentary Screenplay. In 2011, he had a minor role as a Maitre d' in the critically acclaimed independent film Fly Away, directed by Janet Grillo. In 2014, he co-wrote the Hilary Swank-starring drama film You're Not You with Shana Feste. He directed Vera Farmiga, Jacob Tremblay and Virginia Madsen in the comedy-drama adventure film Burn Your Maps.

== Filmography ==
Year	Title	Writer	Producer	Director	Notes
1999	The Debtors	Yes	No	No	Credited as "Cash Barlett"
2004	Around the Bend	Yes	No	Yes	
2005	March of the Penguins	Yes	No	No	Narration: US version
2008	Where The Water Meets The Sky	Yes	No	No	
2012	3, 2, 1... Frankie Go Boom	Yes	No	Yes	
2014	You're Not You	Yes	No	No	
2014	Big Hero 6	Yes	No	No	
2016	Burn Your Maps	Yes	No	Yes	
