= Susan McMartin =

American screenwriter

Susan McMartin is an American screenwriter and producer for film and television. She wrote the screenplay for the 2016 film Mr. Church, which is autobiographical. She also co-wrote the screenplay for the 2019 film After.

Mr. Church was written from her life experiences. Samuel L. Jackson was originally cast to play the family friend and cook who helped raise her. McMartin worked as a writer and producer on the CBS television series Mom and as a writer for Two and a Half Men. She also wrote the book Understanding the Fall.

A single mom, she recounted her financial struggles as an aspiring screenwriter in Hollywood.

In 2024, she was working with Chuck Lorre on a sitcom starring Leanne Morgan for Netflix called Leanne.

== Filmography as screenwriter ==
- Son in Law (1993; story)
- Mr. Church (2016; screenwriter)
- Toni Braxton: Unbreak My Heart (2016; teleplay)
- After (2019; co-writer)
- Leanne (2025; co-creator)
- Regretting You (2025; screenwriter)
