= Hannah Pilkes =

American actress (born 1993)

- Born: Philadelphia, Pennsylvania
- Occupation: Actress
- Years active: 2004–present

Hannah Pilkes (born April 13, 1993) is an American actress and comedian. At age 11 she played Robin in the 2004 drama film The Woodsman with Kevin Bacon. After some time in stand-up comedy, she appeared as Josie in the 2025 sitcom Leanne. Pilkes has also appeared in several Dropout productions.

== Early life ==
Pilkes was born in Philadelphia, Pennsylvania. She grew up in New York City and used to entertain her sister by dressing up in costumes and act like a street performer. She moved to Los Angeles at the age of 20. She is of Dutch descent through her father.

== Career ==
Pilkes made her on-screen debut as Robin in the drama film The Woodsman starring Kevin Bacon. She trained at The Second City in Los Angeles. She gained popularity for her comedy on the podcast Comedy Bang! Bang! and several Dropout productions. Her best known role in her career has been as Josie in the sitcom Leanne.

== Personal life ==
In her spare time, Pilkes visits the Checker Hall which she says has the best cocktails in Los Angeles. She also enjoys gardening. She is a fan of puppeteer Jim Henson and the reality TV show Love Island. Pilkes is queer and married non-binary performance artist Greg Nussen in 2022.

== Filmography ==
=== Film ===
Year	Title	Role	Notes
2004	The Woodsman	Robin	
2007	I Believe in America	Girl with School Books	
2007	Nest of Spiders	Catherine	Short
2011	Lost Revolution	Girl with School Books	
2014	Welcome to Forever	Julie	
2014	Sony	Assistant	
2015	Meatheads	Hannah	
2015	The Visit: Hide n Seek	Babysitter	Short
2016	FML	Rachael	
2016	Holiday Breakup	Party dancer	
2017	#ToothFairies: Staying Relevant	Woman	
2018	Middle School Talent Show	Ashley	
2018	Mammoth	Hannah	Short
2018	Come Around	Mommy	
2021	The Drunken One	Amy	Short
2021	A Square Is a Rectangle	Hannah	Short
2023	Molli and Max in the Future	@MaxSuperFan444	
2023	Excessive	Woman	
2024	We Have Notes	Woman	Short
2024	Move on, Arnold!	Hannah	Short
2024	Kiwi	Lena	Short
2024	Ashes Ashes We All Fall Down	Tiffany	Short
2025	31 Candles	Isabel Cohen	
2025	For Worse	Dylan	
2026	Ghost Hot Tub	Sara	Short

=== Television ===
Year	Title	Role	Notes
2004	Hack	Quinn	Episode: "Misty Blue"
2012	The Faces of LA	Mika Drago	Episode #1.2
2016	Rolston Rye's Guide to LA	Elektra	3 episodes
2013–2016	Average Joe	Hannah	3 episodes
2017	Sorry Not Sorry	Various	24 episodes
2019	The Everything Now Show	Toby Makenspuerses	Episode: "Auditions 2: TARGET 'BROOM FOR MAN'"
2020	Digital Sky	Sofie	Episode: "The Bixby Twins"
2020	Smosh	Khloe Kardashian	Episode: "Every Kardashian Ever"
2021	Yearly Departed	Agent	TV special
2022	Search Party	Hipster #2	Episode: "Revelation"
2023	Earth Girl	Greta Thunberg	Episode: "Mama's Menopause"
2024	Worst First Date	Charlie	Episode: "The Wallflower"
2024	Make Some Noise	Herself	Episode: "A Couple Calls for the Check but Doesn't Know the Hand Motion"
2025	Almost Friday TV	Woman	Episode: "Finally Meeting your Girlfriend's Family"
2025–present	Leanne	Josie Murphy	10 episodes
2026	Hacks	Cindy	Episode: "Number One Fan"
2026	Smartypants	Herself	3 episodes
2026	Game Changer	Herself	2 episodes

=== Podcasts ===
Year	Title	Role	Notes
2023	The Neighborhood Listen	Gwen Whispers	Episode: "In The Midst Of These Crazy Times"
2024	The Best Man's Ghostwriter	Additional performances	
2025	The Novelizers	Herself	Episode: "Mark McKinney, Hannah Pilkes, Craig Baldo - Dirty Dancing 17"
