= Virginia Madsen =

American actress and film producer (born 1961)

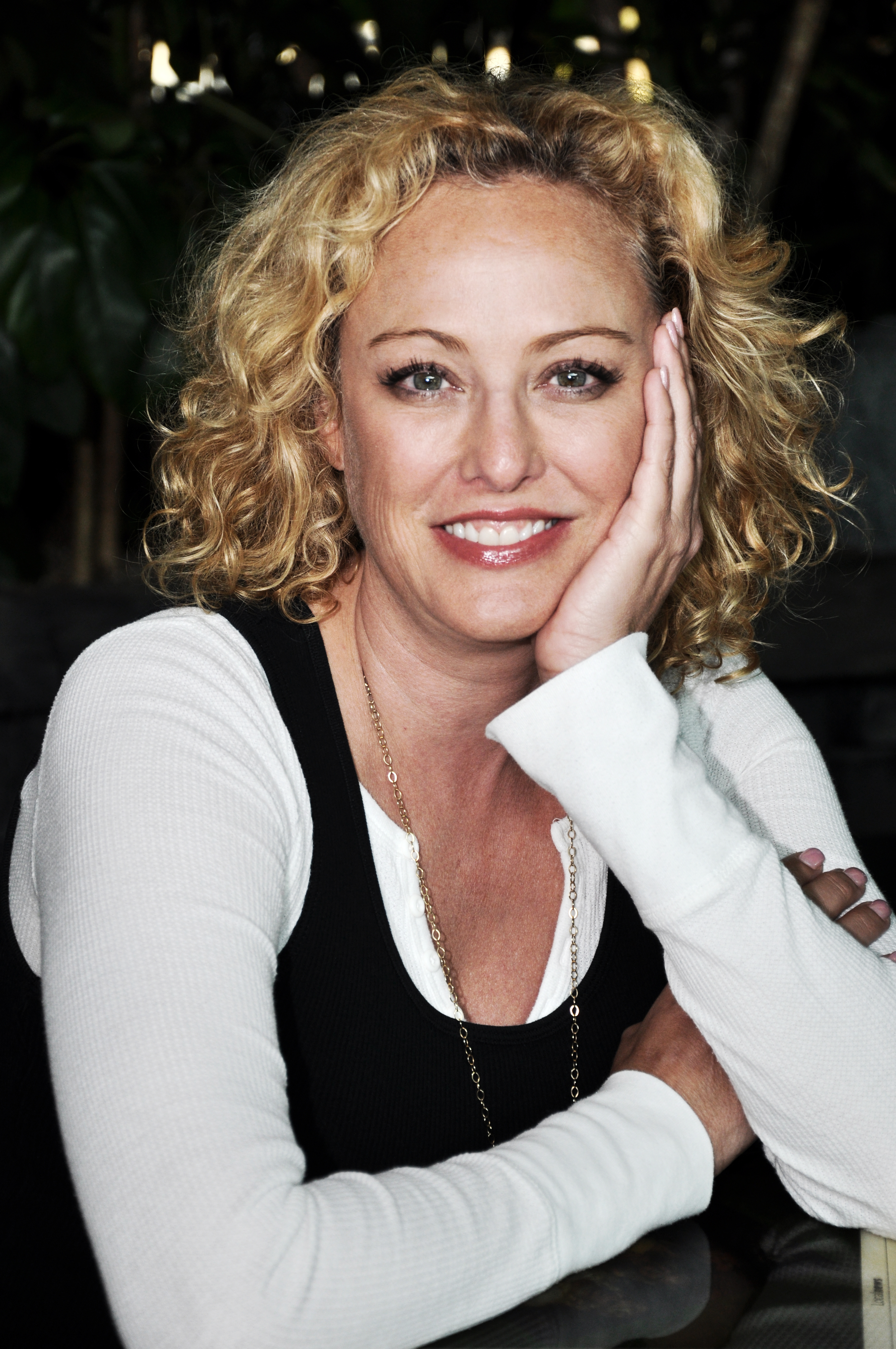
- Madsen in 2012
- Born: September 11, 1961 (age 65); Chicago, Illinois, US
- Occupations: Actress; producer
- Years active: 1983–present
- Spouse(s): Danny Huston (m. 1989; div. 1992) Nick Holmes (m. 2020)
- Partner(s): Antonio Sabàto Jr. (1993–1998)
- Children: 1
- Mother: Elaine Madsen
- Relatives: Michael Madsen (brother); Christian Madsen (nephew)
- Website: virginia-madsen.org

Virginia Madsen (born September 11, 1961) is an American actress. She is the recipient of two Critics' Choice Awards, an Independent Spirit Award, and a Screen Actors Guild Award, as well as nominations for an Academy Award and a Golden Globe Award.

Madsen made her film debut in 1983 with a small part in Class. Her breakout role came the following year when she played Princess Irulan in Dune. After a string of parts in teen films, comedies and thrillers of varying commercial success, Madsen received critical acclaim and a Saturn Award for her starring role as Helen Lyle in Candyman (1992). Subsequent film appearances during the 1990s included The Prophecy (1995), Ghosts of Mississippi (1996), The Rainmaker (1997), and The Haunting (1999). For her portrayal of Maya Randall in Sideways (2004), she was nominated for the Academy Award for Best Supporting Actress. Her other credits include A Prairie Home Companion (2006), The Number 23 (2007), The Haunting in Connecticut (2009), Joy (2015), Her Smell (2018), Prey for the Devil (2022), and Lola (2024).

Outside film, Madsen has played recurring roles on Moonlighting (1989), Frasier (1998), American Dreams (2002–2003), Monk (2009), The Event (2011), Hell on Wheels (2012), Witches of East End (2013–2014), Designated Survivor (2016–2017), and Elementary (2016–2019). Other television credits include American Gothic (2016), The Truth About the Harry Quebert Affair (2018), and Swamp Thing (2019).

== Early life ==
Virginia Madsen was born in Chicago, Illinois, the daughter of Elaine (née Melson), who became an Emmy Award-winning filmmaker and author, and Calvin Christian Madsen, a firefighter. After Madsen's parents divorced in the late 1960s, when the children were young, her mother left a career in finance to pursue a career in the arts, encouraged by film critic Roger Ebert. Madsen's siblings are actor Michael Madsen (1957–2025) and Cheryl Madsen, an entrepreneur. Her paternal grandparents were Danish, and her mother has Irish and Scottish along with distant Native American ancestry. Madsen and her best friend Rusty Schwimmer are graduates of New Trier High School in Winnetka, Illinois.

Madsen later attended the Ted Liss Acting Studio in Chicago, and Harand Camp Adult Theater Seminar in Elkhart Lake, Wisconsin. Of her experience with Liss, she said: "I had wanted to join his class since I was 12. It was well worth the wait because I don't think I could have got that sort of training anywhere else, especially in the United States ... I always wanted to make a real career out of acting."

== Career ==
=== Film ===
Madsen made her acting debut at age 22, in a bit part where she landed her role as Lisa in the romantic comedy film Class (1983), co-starring Jacqueline Bisset and Rob Lowe. She next appeared in Kenny Loggins' music video for "I'm Free (Heaven Helps the Man)" from the Footloose (1984) soundtrack.

She portrayed a cellist named Madeline in the science fiction comedy Electric Dreams with Lenny Von Dohlen (1984). She was cast as Princess Irulan in David Lynch's science fiction epic Dune (1984). In 1985, she starred as Boris (Vincent Spano)'s romantic interest Barbara in the film Creator, which also starred Peter O'Toole.

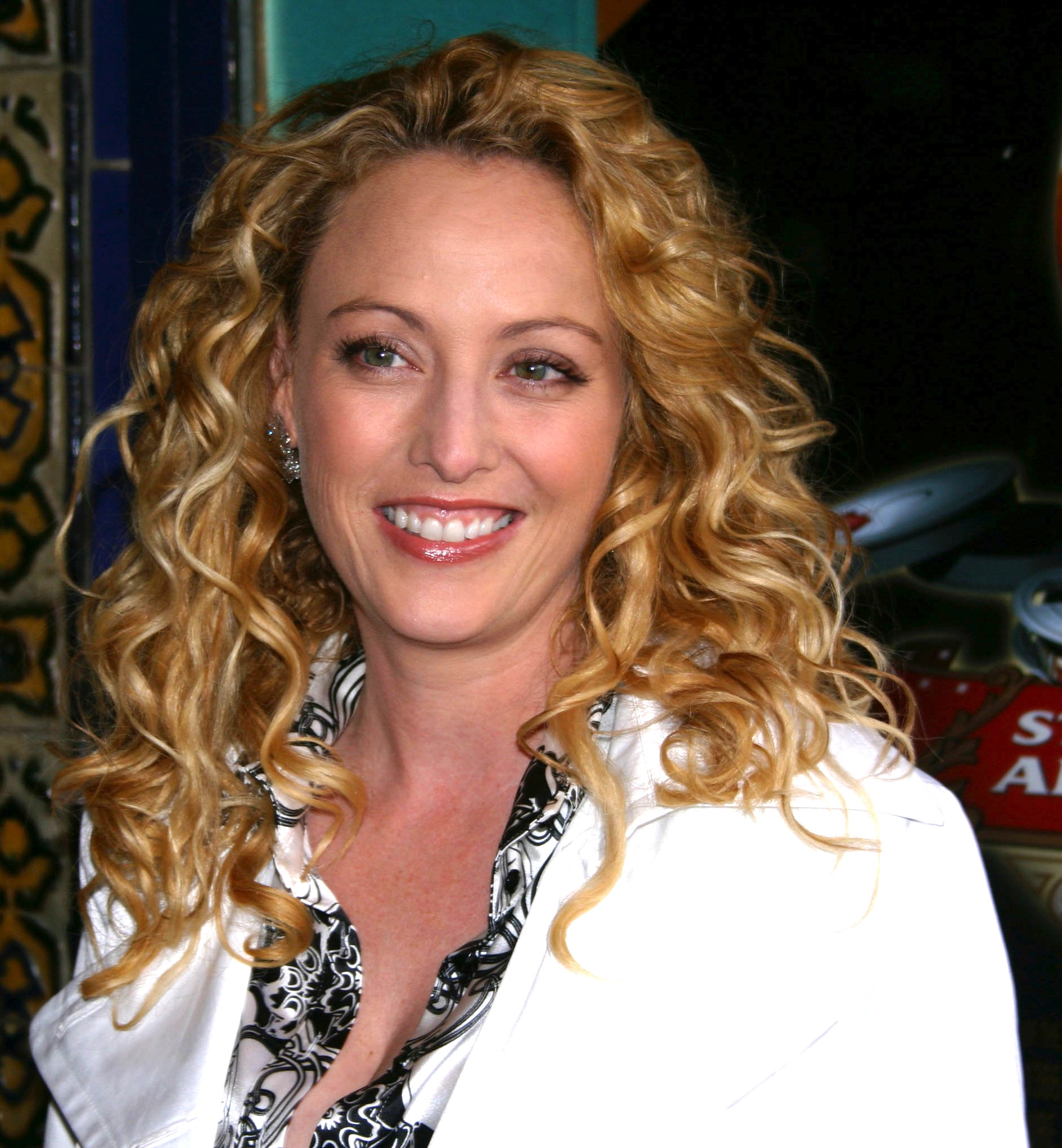
Madsen at the 2006 San Francisco International Film Festival

Madsen first became known to audiences in 1986 with her portrayal of a Catholic school girl who fell in unlove with a boy from a prison camp in Duncan Gibbins' Fire with Fire, though the film drew scathing reviews. As beauty queen Dixie Lee Boxx, she was the love interest of minor league baseball manager Cecil "Stud" Cantrell (William Petersen) in the HBO original film Long Gone (1987). That same year she also appeared in the music video for "I Found Someone" by Cher. She played a secretary named Allison Rowe in the comedy film Hot to Trot (1988).

Madsen also played femme fatales in films such as Slam Dance (1987), Gotham (1988), The Hot Spot (1990), which co-starred Don Johnson and Jennifer Connelly, and Linda (1993).

She also starred as Helen Lyle, an anthropology student, in the horror film Candyman (1992), which drew good reviews and was a box office success.

She appeared in a small role in the Francis Ford Coppola drama The Rainmaker (1997) alongside Matt Damon and Claire Danes. Film critic Roger Ebert said that Madsen had a "strong scene", while reviewer James Berardinelli noted that "the supporting cast is solid, with turns from . . . Virginia Madsen as a witness for the plaintiff".

Madsen delivered a critically acclaimed performance in Sideways (2004), directed by Alexander Payne. Her role catapulted her onto the Hollywood A-list.

Her first major role after Sideways was opposite Harrison Ford and Paul Bettany in Firewall (2006). She later appeared in Robert Altman's A Prairie Home Companion, in a key role as the angel. She co-starred alongside Jim Carrey in The Number 23 and Billy Bob Thornton in The Astronaut Farmer; both films were released in North America on February 23, 2007. She voiced Queen Hippolyta, the mother of Wonder Woman, in the animated film Wonder Woman (2009).

=== Television ===
In 1988, Madsen appeared as Maddie Hayes' cousin in the fifth and final season of the ABC drama series Moonlighting. She has since made various television appearances, including Star Trek: Voyager, CSI: Miami, Dawson's Creek, The Practice, Frasier, and other television series. She was also co-host of the long-running television series Unsolved Mysteries in 1999, during the show's eleventh season (which was also the second and final season on CBS). She starred alongside Ray Liotta in the short-lived CBS crime drama series Smith. She also had a recurring role in the eighth and final season in the USA Network comedy-drama series Monk.

In 2010, she landed the starring role of Cheryl West in the ABC comedy-drama series Scoundrels. In December 2010, it was announced that she would be joining the cast of the NBC science fiction series The Event. In 2012, she joined the cast of the AMC western drama series Hell on Wheels as Mrs. Hannah Durant, first appearing in episode eight of season 2, "The Lord's Day". In 2013, Madsen began appearing on Lifetime's Witches of East End as Penelope Gardiner, the main villainess of the first season.

She starred as Speaker Kimble Hookstraten in the first season of the ABC political drama series Designated Survivor.

=== Producer ===
In 2008, Madsen formed her own film production company called Title IX Productions. Her first project was a film made with her mother titled I Know a Woman Like That. The film is a documentary about the lives of older women. On the creation of the film, she said her mother's active lifestyle was an inspiration to start filming.

My mother's level of activity, of productivity, was exactly why I thought a project like this would work. Originally, when we put the idea together, she had said, "I'm far too busy. I'm going to Holland, and then I'm going here and there and I'm writing my book." But that's really what it's about.

== Personal life ==
Madsen was married to actor and director Danny Huston after meeting on the set of Mr. North (1988). They married in 1989 and divorced in 1992. From 1993 to 1998, Madsen was in a partnership relationship with Antonio Sabàto Jr., with whom she has one son. In 2020, Madsen married actor Nick Holmes after dating for over a decade.

== Filmography ==
=== Film ===
Year	Title	Role	Notes
1983	Class	Lisa	
1984	Electric Dreams	Madeline Robistat	
1984	Dune	Princess Irulan	
1985	The Hearst and Davies Affair	Marion Davies	TV movie
1985	Creator	Barbara Spencer	
1986	Fire with Fire	Lisa Taylor	
1986	Modern Girls	Kelly	
1987	Long Gone	Dixie Lee Boxx	TV movie
1987	Slam Dance	Yolanda Caldwell	
1987	Zombie High	Andrea Miller	
1988	Mr. North	Sally Boffin	
1988	Gotham	Rachel Carlyle	TV movie
1988	Hot to Trot	Allison Rowe	
1989	Third Degree Burn	Anne Scholes	TV movie
1989	Heart of Dixie	Delia June Curry	
1990	The Hot Spot	Dolly Harshaw	
1991	Highlander II: The Quickening	Louise Marcus	
1991	Ironclads	Betty Stuart	TV movie
1991	Victim of Love	Carla Simons	TV movie
1991	Becoming Colette	Polaire Sorel	
1991	Love Kills	Rebecca Bishop	TV movie
1992	Candyman	Helen Lyle	
1992	A Murderous Affair: The Carolyn Warmus Story	Carolyn Warmus	TV movie
1993	Linda	Linda Cowley	TV movie
1994	Caroline at Midnight	Susan Prince	
1994	Blue Tiger	Gina Hayes	
1994	Bitter Vengeance	Annie Westford	TV movie
1995	The Prophecy	Katherine	
1996	Just Your Luck	Kim	Video
1996	Ghosts of Mississippi	Dixie DeLaughter	
1997	The Apocalypse Watch	Karin De Vries	TV movie
1997	The Rainmaker	Jackie Lemanczyk	
1998	Ambushed	Lucy Monroe	
1999	The Florentine	Molly	
1999	Ballad of the Nightingale	Mo Lewis	
1999	The Haunting	Jane Vance	
2000	After Sex	Traci	
2000	Children of Fortune	Ingrid Bast	TV movie
2001	Crossfire Trail	Anne Rodney	TV movie
2001	Lying in Wait	Vera Miller	
2001	Almost Salinas	Clare	
2001	Full Disclosure	Brenda Hopkins	Video
2001	Just Ask My Children	Brenda Kniffen	TV movie
2002	American Gun	Penny Tillman	
2003	Tempted	Emma Burke	TV movie
2003	Artworks	Emma Becker	
2003	Nobody Knows Anything!	Prison Lawyer	
2004	Brave New Girl	Wanda Lovell	TV movie
2004	Sideways	Maya Randall	
2005	Scooby-Doo! in Where's My Mummy?	Cleopatra (voice)	Video
2005	Stuart Little 3: Call of the Wild	The Beast (voice)	Video
2006	Firewall	Beth Stanfield	
2006	A Prairie Home Companion	Dangerous Woman	
2006	The Astronaut Farmer	Audrey "Audie" Farmer	
2007	The Number 23	Agatha Sparrow/Fabrizia	
2007	Ripple Effect	Sherry Atrash	
2007	Cutlass	Robin	Short
2007	Being Michael Madsen	Herself	
2008	Diminished Capacity	Charlotte	
2009	Wonder Woman	Hippolyta (voice)	Video
2009	The Haunting in Connecticut	Sara Campbell	
2010	Father of Invention	Lorraine King	
2011	Red Riding Hood	Suzette	
2011	Marriage Drama	Linda	Short
2012	Hornet's Nest	Judy Hammer	TV movie
2012	The Magic of Belle Isle	Charlotte O'Neil	
2013	The Last Keepers	Abigail Carver	
2013	The Hot Flashes	Clementine Winks	
2013	Crazy Kind of Love	Augusta Iris	
2013	The Anna Nicole Story	Virgie Arthur	TV movie
2013	Jake Squared	Beth	
2014	All the Wilderness	Abigail Charm	
2015	Walter	Karen Benjamin	
2015	Dead Rising: Watchtower	Maggie	
2015	An American Girl: Grace Stirs Up Success	Karen Thomas	
2015	Burning Bodhi	Naomi	
2015	Joy	Terry Mangano	
2016	Burn Your Maps	Victoria	
2016	Better Watch Out	Deandra Lerner	
2017	A Change of Heart	Deena	
2018	1985	Eileen Lester	
2018	Her Smell	Ania Adamcyzk	
2018	Spare Room	Nat	
2020	Operation Christmas Drop	Congresswoman Angie Bradford	
2021	Candyman	Helen Lyle (voice)	
2022	Give Me An A	Coach Judy	
2022	Prey for the Devil	Dr. Peters	
2023	One Day as a Lion	Valerie Brisky	
2023	The Portrait	Mags	
2024	Lola James	Mona	
2026	Street Smart	Beth	

=== Television ===
Year	Title	Role	Notes
1984	American Playhouse	Lou Ellen Purdy	Episode: "A Matter of Principle"
1985	Mussolini: The Untold Story	Claretta Petacci	Main Cast
1987	The Hitchhiker	Christina	Episode: "Perfect Order"
1989	Moonlighting	Annie Charnock	Recurring Cast: Season 5
1994	Earth 2	Alonzo Solace's Dance Partner	Episode: "The Church of Morgan"
1998	Star Trek: Voyager	Kellin	Episode: "Unforgettable"
1999	Frasier	Cassandra Stone	Recurring Cast: Season 6
1999	Unsolved Mysteries	Herself/Co-Host	Main Co-Host: Season 11
2001	The Practice	Marsha Ellison	Recurring Cast: Season 6
2002	Justice League	Dr. Sarah Corwin (voice)	Episode: "The Brave and the Bold: Part I & II"
2002–03	American Dreams	Rebecca Sandstrom	Recurring Cast: Season 1
2003	Pet Star	Herself/Celebrity Judge #2	Episode: "Episode #2.1 & "#2.3"
2003	Dawson's Creek	Maddy Allen	Recurring Cast: Season 6
2003	Spider-Man: The New Animated Series	Silver Sable (voice)	Recurring Cast
2003	CSI: Miami	Krista Walker	Episode: "Death Grip"
2003	Boomtown	Erika Ashland	Episode: "The Big Picture"
2005	Teen Titans	Arella (voice)	Episode: "The Prophecy"
2005–06	Justice League Unlimited	Veronica Sinclair/Roulette (voice)	Guest Cast: Season 2-3
2006	Hollywood Greats	Herself	Episode: "Harrison Ford"
2006	TV Land's Top Ten	Herself	Recurring Guest
2006–07	Smith	Hope Stevens	Main Cast
2006–08	Dog Whisperer with Cesar Millan	Herself	Guest Cast: Season 3-4
2009	Orangutan Island	Herself/Narator	Episode: "Cheating Extinction"
2009	Monk	T.K. Jensen	Recurring Cast: Season 8
2010	Scoundrels	Cheryl West	Main Cast
2011	The Event	Senator Catherine Lewis	Recurring Cast: Season 1
2012	Jan	Mel	Recurring Cast
2012	Hell on Wheels	Mrs. Hannah Durant	Recurring Cast: Season 2
2012	Ruth & Erica	Mel	Episode: "September"
2013	Who's Cooking with Florence Henderson	Herself	Episode: "Virginia Madsen"
2013	Susanna	Mel	Episode: "Episode #1.12"
2013	Witches of East End	Penelope Gardiner	Recurring Cast: Season 1
2014	A Healthy You & Carol Alt	Herself	Episode: "May 3, 2014"
2014	Let's Go to the Movies	Herself	Episode: "Virginia Madsen"
2015	Metropolis	Herself	Recurring Guest
2015	Law & Order: Special Victims Unit	Beth Anne Rollins	Episode: "Maternal Instincts"
2015–16	Celebrity Name Game	Herself/Celebrity Player	Episode: "Ross Mathews & Virginia Madsen 1-3"
2016	Pickle and Peanut	Jackson (voice)	Episode: "Night Shift/Scalped"
2016	American Gothic	Madeline Hawthorne	Main Cast
2016–17	Designated Survivor	Kimble Hookstraten	Recurring Cast: Season 1
2016–19	Elementary	Paige Cowan	Guest Cast: Season 4-5 & 7
2017	Voltron: Legendary Defender	Commander Heera (voice)	Episode: "Hole in the Sky"
2018	The Truth About the Harry Quebert Affair	Tamara Quinn	Main Cast
2019	Swamp Thing	Maria Sunderland	Main Cast
2020	Svengoolie	Herself	Episode: "Dracula's Daughter"
2021	Behind the Monsters	Herself	Episode: "Candyman"
2023	Obliterated	Marge McKnight	Episode: "Walks of Shame"
2024	Holidazed	Connie Manetti-Hanahan	Recurring Cast

=== Music Videos ===
Year	Song	Artist
1984	"I'm Free (Heaven Helps the Man)"	Kenny Loggins
1986	"But Not Tonight"	Depeche Mode
1987	"I Found Someone"	Cher
1989	"Liberian Girl"	Michael Jackson

=== Documentary ===
Year	Title
2001	Captured on Film: The True Story of Marion Davies
2003	Complicated Women
2009	I Know a Woman Like That
2012	Made in New Mexico
2013	Battling Darkness
2016	Joy, Strength and Perseverance

=== Podcasts ===
Year	Title
2018–21	Imagined Life
2020–23	Little Stories Everywhere
2021–23	Whose Amazing Life?

== Awards and nominations ==
Year	Nominated work	Award	Result
1993	Candyman	Avoriaz Fantastic Film Festival Award for Best Actress	Won
1993	Candyman	Fangoria Chainsaw Award for Best Actress	Won
1993	Candyman	Saturn Award for Best Actress	Won
2004	Sideways	Boston Society of Film Critics Award for Best Cast	Won
2004	Sideways	Chicago Film Critics Association Award for Best Supporting Actress	Won
2004	Sideways	Critics' Choice Movie Award for Best Acting Ensemble	Won
2004	Sideways	Critics' Choice Movie Award for Best Supporting Actress	Won
2004	Sideways	Dallas–Fort Worth Film Critics Association Award for Best Supporting Actress	Won
2004	Sideways	Independent Spirit Award for Best Supporting Female	Won
2004	Sideways	Iowa Film Critics Award for Best Supporting Actress	Won
2004	Sideways	Los Angeles Film Critics Association Award for Best Supporting Actress	Won
2004	Sideways	National Society of Film Critics Award for Best Supporting Actress	Won
2004	Sideways	New York Film Critics Circle Award for Best Supporting Actress	Won
2004	Sideways	New York Film Critics Online Award for Best Supporting Actress	Won
2004	Sideways	Phoenix Film Critics Society Award for Best Cast	Won
2004	Sideways	San Francisco Film Critics Circle Award for Best Supporting Actress	Won
2004	Sideways	Satellite Award for Best Cast – Motion Picture	Won
2004	Sideways	Screen Actors Guild Award for Outstanding Performance by a Cast in a Motion Picture	Won
2004	Sideways	Seattle Film Critics Award for Best Supporting Actress	Won
2004	Sideways	Southeastern Film Critics Association Award for Best Supporting Actress	Won
2004	Sideways	Toronto Film Critics Association Award for Best Supporting Actress	Won
2004	Sideways	Vancouver Film Critics Circle Award for Best Supporting Actress	Won
2004	Sideways	Academy Award for Best Supporting Actress	Nominated
2004	Sideways	Golden Globe Award for Best Supporting Actress – Motion Picture	Nominated
2004	Sideways	Online Film Critics Society Award for Best Supporting Actress	Nominated
2004	Sideways	Satellite Award for Best Supporting Actress – Motion Picture	Nominated
2004	Sideways	Screen Actors Guild Award for Outstanding Performance by a Female Actor in a Supporting Role	Nominated
2004	Sideways	Washington D.C. Area Film Critics Association Award for Best Supporting Actress	Nominated
2006	A Prairie Home Companion	Broadcast Film Critics Association Award for Best Cast	Nominated
2006	A Prairie Home Companion	Gotham Independent Film Award for Best Ensemble Cast	Nominated
