= Fire with Fire (1986 film) =

1986 American romantic drama film

- Theatrical release poster
- Directed by: Duncan Gibbins
- Screenplay by: Bill Phillips; Warren Skaaren; Paul Boorstin; Sharon Boorstin
- Produced by: Gary Nardino
- Starring: Virginia Madsen; Craig Sheffer; Kate Reid
- Cinematography: Hiro Narita
- Edited by: Peter E. Berger
- Music by: Howard Shore
- Distributed by: Paramount Pictures
- Release date: May 9, 1986
- Running time: 103 minutes
- Country: United States
- Language: English
- Box office: $4,636,169

Fire with Fire is a 1986 American romantic drama film about a young woman from a Catholic boarding school who runs away with an escapee from a nearby prison camp. The film stars Virginia Madsen, Craig Sheffer, Jon Polito, Kate Reid, Kari Wuhrer, Tim Russ and D.B. Sweeney. It was directed by Duncan Gibbins, and features a soundtrack by Howard Shore.

== Plot ==
Joe Fisk is a juvenile delinquent who falls in love with Lisa Taylor, a beautiful Catholic girls' school student, in an Oregon forest. The two meet by accident when Joe finds her being chased by his peers in a training exercise, and sees Lisa recreating the Pre-Raphaelite painting Ophelia by John Everett Millais by floating in the lake. Both of them are strongly drawn towards each other but as their current custodians discourage contact with the opposite sex they both find themselves in trouble. Forced to run away with each other, the young lovers hope to avoid the police and find happiness.

== Cast ==
- Craig Sheffer as Joe Fisk
- Virginia Madsen as Lisa Taylor
- Jon Polito as Mr. Duchard, The Boss
- J. J. Cohen as Myron, The Mapmaker
- Kate Reid as Sister Victoria
- Jean Smart as Sister Marie
- Tim Russ as Jerry Washington
- Kari Wuhrer as Gloria
- D.B. Sweeney as Thomas Baxter
- Ann Savage as Sister Harriet
- David Harris as Ben Halsey
- William G. Schilling as Watley
- Garry Chalk as Deputy
- Ian Tracey as Panther
- Janne Mortil as Schoolgirl
- Robyn Stevan as Schoolgirl
- Dominick Brascia as Joey Burns

== Release ==
Fire with Fire was released to theaters on May 9, 1986. The film grossed a little over $4.6 million.

== Reception ==
Critics were generally negative at the time of the movie's release, saying the film was dull and slow-paced, and noted that the screenplay, credited to four writers, was poorly written.

== Home media ==
It was released on VHS in 1986 by its own studio and on Blu-ray Disc and DVD on July 31, 2012, by Olive Films. As of 2021, it is available through Amazon Video, iTunes Store and Vudu. The film was shot and produced under the original title Captive Hearts, but was changed to Fire with Fire just prior to the film's theatrical release. Due to the late change in title, press-kit stills are seen with the original title initials "CH", followed by a hyphen and the press still number, etched onto the film negatives and carried over onto the printed stills. The film's new title was deemed more descriptive and exciting, as well as allowing a marketing tie-in with a song of the same title, "Fire with Fire" by the 1980s band Wild Blue.
