= Mr. Church =

2016 American drama film by Bruce Beresford

- Theatrical release poster
- Directed by: Bruce Beresford
- Written by: Susan McMartin
- Produced by: Lee Nelson; David Buelow; Courtney Solomon; Mark Canton
- Starring: Eddie Murphy; Britt Robertson; Xavier Samuel; Lucy Fry; Christian Madsen; Natascha McElhone
- Cinematography: Sharone Meir
- Edited by: David Beatty
- Music by: Mark Isham
- Production companies: Cinelou Films; Envision Media Arts; Shenghua Entertainment; Voltage Pictures
- Distributed by: Cinelou Releasing; Freestyle Releasing (United States); Warner Bros. Pictures (International)
- Release dates: April 22, 2016 (Tribeca Film Festival); September 16, 2016 (United States)
- Running time: 104 minutes
- Country: United States
- Language: English
- Budget: $8 million
- Box office: $685,780

Mr. Church is a 2016 American drama film directed by Bruce Beresford and written by Susan McMartin. The film stars Eddie Murphy as the title character with Britt Robertson, Xavier Samuel, Lucy Fry, Christian Madsen and Natascha McElhone also starring. The movie is based on the short story "The Cook Who Came to Live with Us" written by McMartin and based on her life. The film centers around a cook who becomes a caretaker and father figure to three generations of women over the years. This was Murphy's first film role in four years.

The film debuted on April 22, 2016, at the Tribeca Film Festival and was released on September 16, 2016, by Cinelou Releasing and Freestyle Releasing. Mr. Church received generally negative reviews from critics, although Murphy's performance was mostly praised, and the film received a more favorable reception from audiences.

== Plot ==
In 1971, Charlie Brooks, age 10, lives with her single mother, Marie Brooks, in Los Angeles, California. One morning, Charlie wakes to the sounds and smells of cooking wafting in from the kitchen. She is shocked to find a strange man, Mr. Church, preparing breakfast. Her mother states he will be their new cook. Charlie is initially distrustful of Mr. Church and urges her mother to fire him.

Charlie learns that Mr. Church was hired by Richard Cannon, a wealthy entrepreneur Marie dated until she learned he was married. When Cannon died, he left provisions in his will that provided financial support for Marie, who was diagnosed with terminal breast cancer. The provisions were only slated to last for six months, to match her diagnosed life expectancy. When Mr. Church informs Marie that he was guaranteed a lifetime salary to care for the family, she decides to keep Mr. Church on as their cook on the condition that he keeps her cancer a secret from Charlie.

Six years later, in 1977, Marie is still alive and Mr. Church has become a comfortable fixture in the household for both Charlie and her mother. Charlie is now a senior in high school and aware of her mother's cancer. Charlie grows distant from her mother and closer to Mr. Church because of her inability to face Marie's impending death. When Charlie decides not to attend her prom, Marie promises to live long enough if Charlie promises to go. The three take photos as a family and Charlie goes to the prom. Several days later, Mr. Church meets Charlie to deliver the news that her mother has died.

Mr. Church stays with Charlie after Marie dies. Charlie graduates from high school and gets accepted to Boston University. With some financial assistance from Mr. Church and the gift of a car, Charlie begins her freshman year. Three years later, in 1980, a pregnant Charlie shows up on Mr. Church's doorstep, stating that she has returned home to take a break from her studies. Charlie eventually asks Mr. Church if she could live with him. He agrees, as long as she abides by one rule, and that is to respect his privacy. The next night, an angry, drunk Mr. Church returns home, confronting Charlie for rifling through his dresser. Despite being pregnant, he makes her leave for violating the one rule. She leaves, and the next day runs into Larson, an old friend from the neighborhood, in a grocery store parking lot. After exchanging greetings, Charlie heads back to her car, only to be knocked unconscious to the ground by a kid on a skateboard.

Larson, who cannot drive due to a drunk driving incident sometime earlier, hurriedly drives her to the hospital. Mr. Church arrives shortly after Charlie is in the hospital and claims her as his responsibility. Charlie later gives birth to a baby girl named Isabel, nicknamed Izzy. They come home to live with Mr. Church.

Five years later, in 1986, Charlie is working as a waitress; she and Mr. Church are raising Izzy as a blended family. When Mr. Church becomes too ill to cook, Charlie begins to cook and realises that she has learned from Mr. Church after years of watching him prepare food. Mr. Church grows sicker and eventually dies.

During the wake, Charlie is startled to find out from Jelly, a nightclub owner, that Mr. Church had played the piano at his club for 30 years. Jelly is surprised to discover that Mr. Church knew how to cook. Charlie realizes that Mr. Church was even more mysterious than she thought and that he had lives that he kept apart from one another. The next morning, Charlie wakes up to the smell of breakfast cooking and, in her sleepy state, wonders if it is Mr. Church, but it is Izzy, preparing a meal for them. Like her mother, Izzy learned the basics of cooking from watching him in the kitchen. Charlie writes the story of her life with Mr. Church.

== Cast ==
- Eddie Murphy as Henry Joseph Church
- Britt Robertson as Charlie Brooks
  - Natalie Coughlin as Young Charlotte
- Natascha McElhone as Marie Brooks
- Xavier Samuel as Owen
  - Lincoln Melcher as Young Owen
- Lucy Fry as Poppy
  - Madison Wolfe as Young Poppy
- Christian Madsen as Eddie Larson
- Mckenna Grace as Izzy Brooks
- Thom Barry as Frankie Twiggs

== Production ==
In October 2013, it was revealed that David Anspaugh would direct the film from a screenplay by Susan McMartin, with Lee Nelson, David Buelow and David Tish producing under their Envision Media Arts arts banner, while Brad Kaplan would produce under Evolution Entertainment. In 2011, McMartin had written "The Cook Who Came to Live with Us," which was the story on which the screenplay is based.

In April 2014, it was revealed that Samuel L. Jackson, Uma Thurman and Juno Temple had been cast in the film.

In October 2014, Eddie Murphy joined the cast of the film, replacing Jackson, who had to drop out due to a scheduling conflict, with Bruce Beresford directing the film. Mark Canton and Courtney Solomon joined the project as producers under their Cinelou Films banner.

In November 2014, Britt Robertson joined the cast of the film, replacing Temple. Its working title was Cook but was retitled to Henry Joseph Church, the full name of Murphy's character, before being retitled to Mr. Church.

Murphy said he took the role because it was "something [he] hadn’t done before".

=== Filming ===
Principal photography began on November 24, 2014, in Los Angeles, California. Production concluded on January 12, 2015.

With a production budget of $8 million, it is the least expensive film of Murphy's career.

== Release ==
In December 2014, the first image of Murphy and Robertson was released. The film had its world premiere at the Tribeca Film Festival on April 22, 2016. Warner Bros. Pictures distributed the film internationally, part of Cinelou Films' six-film deal with the company. It was distributed domestically by Cinelou Releasing. The film was released in the United States on September 16, 2016.

== Reception ==
Mr. Church received negative reviews from critics. On Rotten Tomatoes, the film has an approval rating of 24% based on 33 reviews, with an average rating of 4.4/10. On Metacritic, the film holds a weighted average score of 37 out of 100, based on 12 critics, indicating "generally unfavorable reviews". In contrast, the film had a more favorable reception from audiences, earning a 81% audience approval score on Rotten Tomatoes.

Mark Jenkins of The Washington Post gave the film two out of four stars, and wrote: "Murphy is fine as the title character, although his performance consists mostly of suppressing all of his usual shtick. He certainly doesn't endow Mr. Church with any unexpected depths. But then neither does the script." Nick Schager of Variety called it "A crude sugary-sweet fantasy" and "consuming so much phony, retrograde schmaltz proves a stomach-churning endeavor."
