= Elaine Madsen =

American filmmaker and author

- Occupation: Filmmaker
- Spouse: Calvin Christian Madsen (divorced)
- Children: Michael Madsen; Virginia Madsen
- Relatives: Christian Madsen (grandson)

Elaine Madsen is an American author and filmmaker. She won an Emmy Award (Chicago / Midwest) in 1983 for producing the documentary Better Than It Has to Be.

== Career ==
She originally embarked on a career in finance, later deciding to pursue more creative endeavors for herself. In the 1960s she became an acquaintance of Roger Ebert, who encouraged her to pursue a career in the film industry.

In 1983, she produced a documentary titled Better Than It Has to Be, for which she won an Emmy Award (Chicago / Midwest). The documentary is about the history of filmmaking in the Chicago area.

In 2007, Madsen co-authored with Douglass Stewart a book titled The Texan and the Dutch Gas.

In 2009, Madsen published a book of original poems titled Crayola Can't Make These Colors. She has written for several magazines and also spent time as a film critic.

In 2009, she partnered with her daughter to produce and direct I Know a Woman Like That, a documentary featuring interviews with several women over 60 and how they defy age stereotypes. Featured interviews include Rita Moreno, Lauren Hutton, Elaine Kaufman, and Eartha Kitt. She works with her daughter's film production company, Title IX Productions. The name was chosen from the 1972 law that defends against gender discrimination.

In 2016, Madsen became editor of Felix Magazine, which funds the Aparecio Foundation.

== Personal life ==
Madsen is divorced from Calvin Christian Madsen, a firefighter, with whom she had two children, actress Virginia Madsen and actor Michael Madsen. Her grandson is actor Christian Madsen. Elaine Madsen moved California for filmmaking and writing. Her daughter Cheri lives in Wisconsin. Her daughter Virginia lives in California.
