= 3, 2, 1... Frankie Go Boom =

- Film poster
- Directed by: Jordan Roberts
- Written by: Jordan Roberts
- Produced by: Marcel Langenegger; Pavlina Hatoupis; Katayoun A. Marciano
- Starring: Charlie Hunnam; Chris O'Dowd; Lizzy Caplan; Nora Dunn; Whitney Cummings; Ron Perlman; Chris Noth
- Cinematography: Mattias Troelstrup
- Edited by: Michael Hofacre
- Music by: Matt Messina
- Production company: Ministry of Content
- Distributed by: Variance Films (United States); Universal Pictures Home Entertainment (International)
- Release dates: March 10, 2012 (SXSW); October 12, 2012 (United States)
- Running time: 89 minutes
- Country: United States
- Language: English
- Budget: $480,000

3, 2, 1... Frankie Go Boom is a 2012 American comedy film written and directed by Jordan Roberts and starring Charlie Hunnam, Chris O'Dowd, Lizzy Caplan, Ron Perlman, and Chris Noth.

== Plot ==
Two brothers seek the help of a transgender hacker in erasing all evidence of a sex tape from the internet before the unhinged movie star father of the girl involved seeks violent revenge. Cast member Lizzy Caplan described the plot: "It's about a guy whose life has been ruined by a YouTube video that has gone viral and so he's been hiding out and he gets brought back into civilization (because he's been living in the middle of nowhere) by his really manipulative, horrible brother. And everybody in his life is sort of terrible [and it's about] how he deals with that."

== Cast ==
- Charlie Hunnam as Frankie
- Chris O'Dowd as Bruce
- Lizzy Caplan as Lassie
- Nora Dunn as Karen
- Whitney Cummings as Claudia
- Ron Perlman as Phyllis
- Chris Noth as Jack
- Sam Anderson as Chris

== Development ==
Filming began on the week of November 10, 2010.

Ron Perlman was offered two different roles in the film, but accepted the role of a transgender character. He is quoted as saying "They offered me two different roles and I went for the transsexual because I felt like when the door opens and you see that it's me, it should get a 'Yuck!'"

== Reception ==
As of June 2020, the film holds a 45% approval rating on Rotten Tomatoes, based on 22 reviews with an average rating of 5.26/10.
