= Burn Your Maps =

- Promotional poster
- Directed by: Jordan Roberts
- Written by: Jordan Roberts
- Based on: Burn Your Maps by Robyn Joy Leff
- Produced by: Julie Kirkham; Mark Canton; Courtney Solomon; Patrick Aiello
- Starring: Vera Farmiga; Jacob Tremblay; Suraj Sharma; Ramón Rodríguez; Virginia Madsen; Marton Csokas
- Cinematography: John Bailey
- Edited by: Susan Shipton
- Music by: Jonathan Goldsmith
- Production companies: Cinelou Films; Patrick Aiello Productions; Defender Films; Wheel Entertainment Films
- Distributed by: Vertical Entertainment
- Release dates: September 9, 2016 (TIFF); June 21, 2019 (United States)
- Running time: 102 minutes
- Country: United States
- Language: English
- Budget: $8 million

Burn Your Maps is a 2016 American comedy-drama film written and directed by Jordan Roberts, based on the short story of the same name by Robyn Joy Leff. The film stars Vera Farmiga, Jacob Tremblay, Suraj Sharma, Ramón Rodríguez, Virginia Madsen, and Marton Csokas.

The film had its world premiere at the 2016 Toronto International Film Festival on September 9, 2016, and was released on June 21, 2019, by Vertical Entertainment.

== Plot ==
After the death of his infant sister, 8-year-old American boy Wes tells his grieving parents that he is a Mongolian goat-herder who was born in the wrong place. Joined by an ambitious young filmmaker named Ismail, Wes leads his family to Mongolia on a soul-searching journey.

== Cast ==
- Vera Farmiga as Alise Firth
- Jacob Tremblay as Wes Firth
- Suraj Sharma as Ismail
- Virginia Madsen as Victoria
- Marton Csokas as Connor Firth
- Ramón Rodríguez as Batbayar
- Taylor Geare as Becca Firth
- Glynis Davies as Lillian
- Jason Scott Lee as Shaman Helper
- Nomin Bayasgalan as Enkhtuyaa
- Valerie Planche as Maureen

== Production ==
=== Development ===
On June 18, 2015, it was reported that Julie Kirkham was to produce a feature film titled Burn Your Maps, written and directed by Jordan Roberts. The film was green-lit by producer Mark Canton a few days prior to Kirkham's death. Burn Your Maps is a feature film adaptation of author Robyn Joy Leff's short story of the same name. Canton and Courtney Solomon serve as producers under their Cinelou Films banner, with Patrick Aiello producing through his Patrick Aiello Productions. Jonathan Goldsmith composed the film's musical score.

=== Casting ===
The casting of Vera Farmiga, Virginia Madsen, Suraj Sharma, and Jacob Tremblay was reported on July 23, 2015. Marton Csokas' casting was confirmed near the end of production, on August 28, 2015.

=== Filming ===
Principal photography began in Calgary, Alberta, Canada on July 27, 2015, and was completed on September 2, 2015. Filming took place in nearby Kananaskis Country, at the Stoney Indian Reserves, which doubled for Mongolia. Scenes were also filmed at the Eighth Avenue Place tower, which doubled for an American office space and for a Tokyo International Airport terminal. Over one hundred Calgary residents of Mongolian heritage were hired to act in minor roles.

== Release ==
Burn Your Maps first screened at the 2016 Toronto International Film Festival on September 9, 2016, and had its red carpet premiere at the festival on September 15. It was initially scheduled for limited release on February 24, 2017, before expanding at a later date. The release date was subsequently pushed back to March 17, 2017, with a wide release following on March 24, 2017. However, it was ultimately pulled from the schedule.

Vertical Entertainment distributed the film in the United States. The film was distributed internationally by Warner Bros. Pictures as part of a six-film deal with Cinelou. It was released on June 21, 2019.

== Critical reception ==
Burn Your Maps holds a 67% approval rating on review aggregator website Rotten Tomatoes, based on 15 reviews, with a weighted average of 7.04/10. On Metacritic, the film holds a rating of 50 out of 100, based on 8 critics, indicating "mixed or average".

== Accolades ==
Award	Category	Recipient(s)	Result	Ref(s)
Calgary International Film Festival	Audience Award for Best Narrative Feature	Burn Your Maps	Won	
Leiden International Film Festival	American Indie Competition	Burn Your Maps	1st Place	
Gold Coast International Film Festival	Audience Award for Best Narrative Feature	Burn Your Maps	Won	
