= Third Degree Burn =

1989 film by Roger Spottiswoode

- Genre: Crime
- Written by: Duncan Gibbins; Yale Udoff
- Directed by: Roger Spottiswoode
- Starring: Treat Williams; Virginia Madsen; Richard Masur; CCH Pounder; Mary Armstrong; John Aylward
- Composer: Charles Gross
- Country of origin: United States of America
- Original language: English

Production
- Executive producer: Marianne Moloney
- Producer: Fredda Weiss
- Production locations: Seattle, Washington; Tucson, Arizona
- Cinematography: Alexander Gruszynski
- Editor: Garth Craven
- Running time: 100 minutes
- Production companies: HBO Pictures; Paramount Pictures; MTM Enterprises

Original release
- Network: HBO
- Release: May 28, 1989

Third Degree Burn is a 1989 American made-for-television crime film directed by Roger Spottiswoode, written by Duncan Gibbins and Yale Udoff, and starring Treat Williams, Virginia Madsen, Richard Masur, CCH Pounder, Mary Armstrong and John Aylward. It premiered on HBO on May 28, 1989.

== Plot ==
Private investigator Scott Weston makes a living investigating other people's lives. A businessman, Clay Reynolds hires him to follow his wife, Anne because Clay suspects that she might be unfaithful. Scott falls in love with Anne. When her husband is murdered, Weston is framed for the crime.

== Cast ==
- Treat Williams as Scott Weston
- Virginia Madsen as Anne Scholes
- Richard Masur as Clay Reynolds
- CCH Pounder as Julie Cartwright
- Mary Armstrong as Anita Stevens
- John Aylward as Lomas
- George Catalano as Del Routh
- Michael Chapman as Dan Rourke
- William Marquez as Gutierrez
- Joe Mays as Frank Gaudy
- Robert Nadir as Art Hanson
- Alex Thayer as Adams
- Rick Tutor as Fred
- Lisa Zebro as Nancy Rourke
