= Michael Madsen =

American actor (1957–2025)

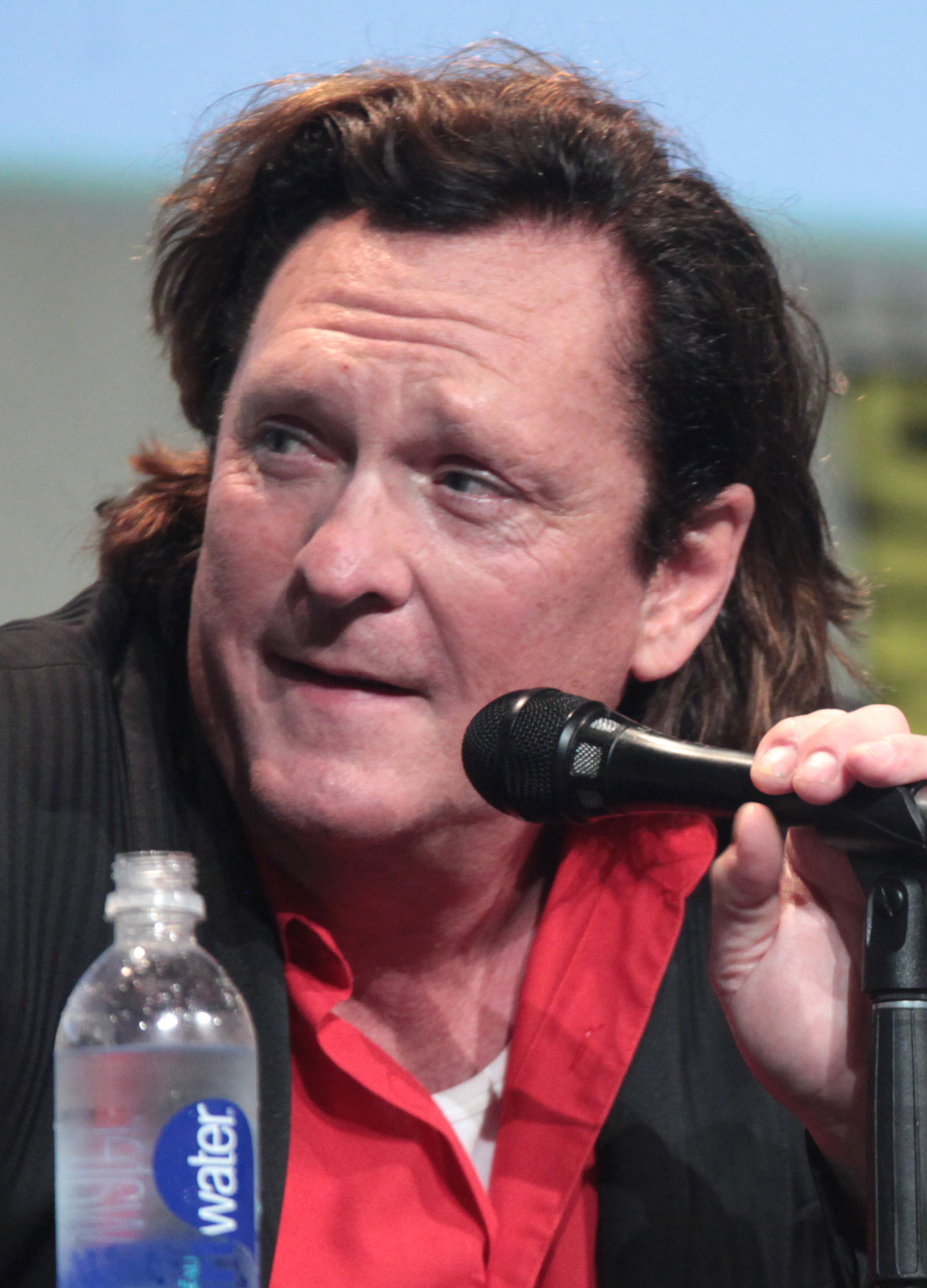
- Madsen in 2015
- Born: Michael Søren Madsen; September 25, 1957; Chicago, Illinois, U.S.
- Died: July 3, 2025 (aged 67); Malibu, California, U.S.
- Resting place: Mount Sinai Memorial Park
- Other name: Maykl Madsen
- Occupation: Actor
- Years active: 1982–2025
- Spouses: Georganne LaPiere (m. 1984; div. 1988); Jeannine Bisignano (m. 1991; div. 1995); DeAnna Morgan (m. 1996)
- Children: 6, including Christian
- Relatives: Elaine Madsen (mother); Virginia Madsen (sister)
- Website: michaelmadsen.com

Michael Søren Madsen (September 25, 1957 – July 3, 2025) was an American actor. He was widely known for starring in Quentin Tarantino's films such as Reservoir Dogs (1992), Kill Bill: Volume 2 (2004), and The Hateful Eight (2015). His other film roles included WarGames (1983), The Natural (1984),Our Family Honor (1985 -1986) The Doors (1991), Thelma & Louise (1991), Free Willy (1993), Species (1995), Donnie Brasco (1997), Die Another Day (2002), Sin City (2005), and Scary Movie 4 (2006). Madsen also voiced characters in video games such as Grand Theft Auto III (2001), Driver 3 (2004), Narc (2005), the Dishonored series (2012–2017), The Walking Dead: Season Two (2014), and Crime Boss: Rockay City (2023). Madsen had six children, including actor Christian Madsen.

== Early life ==
Michael Søren Madsen was born in Chicago on September 25, 1957, the son of Elaine (née Melson), a filmmaker and author, and Calvin Christian Madsen, a World War II Navy veteran and firefighter with the Chicago Fire Department. His mother had Irish and Native American ancestry, while his paternal grandparents were Danish immigrants. He had two sisters: actress Virginia and entrepreneur Cheryl. His parents divorced in the 1960s; his mother, having been encouraged by film critic Roger Ebert, left the financial world to pursue a career in the arts. Madsen attended Evanston Township High School in Evanston, Illinois.

== Career ==
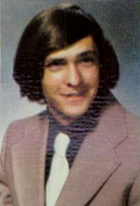
Madsen as a high school senior in 1975

Madsen began working at the Steppenwolf Theatre Company in Chicago, where he served as an apprentice under John Malkovich and appeared in a production of Of Mice and Men.

His first notable film role was a small part for the science fiction film, WarGames. He appeared in John Dahl's thriller Kill Me Again as criminal Vince Miller opposite Val Kilmer and Joanne Whalley. In Quentin Tarantino's directorial debut film Reservoir Dogs, Madsen played "Mr. Blonde", a cruel criminal. Steve Buscemi received the role of "Mr. Pink", which Madsen wanted because it had more scenes with Harvey Keitel. For Pulp Fiction, Madsen declined the role of Vincent Vega, which went to John Travolta.

Madsen starred in the crime film Donnie Brasco. He said of his later choice of film roles: "Some of them I'm only in for 10 minutes, but they bought my name, and they bought my face to put on the DVD box with a gun. What people don't always understand is that I established a certain lifestyle for my family back in the days of Species and Mulholland Falls and The Getaway. I wasn't about to move my six kids into a trailer park... when people offered me work, it wasn't always the best, but I had to buy groceries and I had to put gas in the car."

In 1993, Madsen appeared in Free Willy as Glen Greenwood, the apprehensive but devout foster father of the film's main character played by Jason James Richter (a role he reprised in the sequel). Madsen played assassin Budd, the brother of Bill (David Carradine), in Kill Bill: Volume 2. In 2004, Tarantino discussed an idea for a film to unite Madsen and Travolta, as The Vega Brothers. In 2007, Tarantino said the film (which he intended to call Double V Vega) was "kind of unlikely now", because of the age of the actors and the onscreen deaths of both characters.

Madsen appeared in Uwe Boll's BloodRayne, a film he said is "an abomination... It's a horrifying and preposterous movie." He won Best Actor awards at the Boston Film Festival and New York International Independent Film and Video Festival for his performance in Strength and Honour. He played himself in the mockumentary Being Michael Madsen. Madsen co-starred in Coma, a Web series on Crackle.

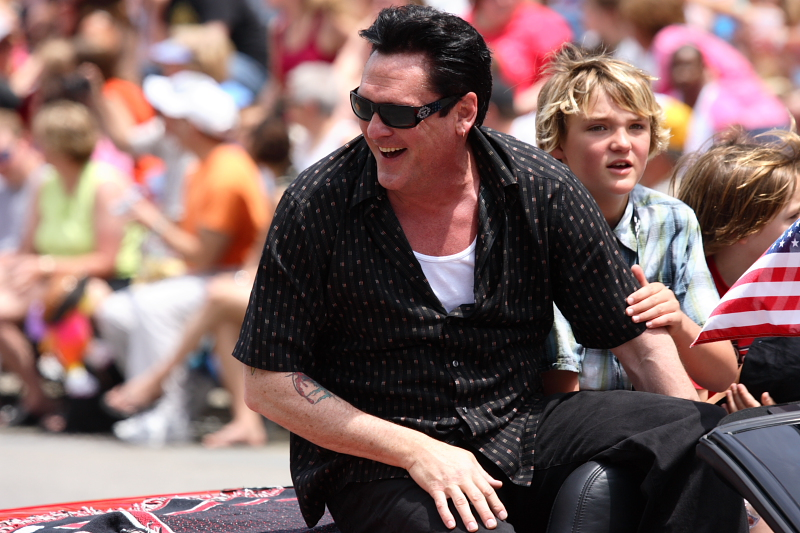
Madsen in the 2006 Indianapolis 500 All Star Festival Parade (with his son, right)

He played Jim Ricker, the old friend of Jack Bauer (Kiefer Sutherland), in the eighth season of 24. Madsen starred in the comedy film Let the Game Begin. On January 5, 2012, he entered the Celebrity Big Brother house and he finished in 4th place in the competition. In February 2014, he played Las Vegas casino mogul Ted Binion in Josh Evans' film Death in the Desert. The screenplay was written by John Steppling, based on the book Death in the Desert by crime writer Cathy Scott.In August 2014, Madsen starred in the Kill Bill-themed music video for the song "Black Widow" by Iggy Azalea featuring Rita Ora.

Madsen starred in the ensemble western film The Hateful Eight. He was among a number of people rumored to have leaked the film's script before it was released, causing Tarantino to almost not make the film and eventually rewrite it. It was later revealed that Madsen was not responsible for leaking the script. In 2016, he played a dramatized role of former Texas Ranger Phil Ryan in Real Detective on the Investigation Discovery network. He was an executive producer in Vilan Trub's crime drama film The Dirty Kind, which is loosely inspired by Anthony Weiner. In 2024, he played Kensei, a "white Samurai" operating an underground society in the thriller Dark feathers: Dance of the Geisha, directed by Crystal J. Huang and Nicholas Ryan. His performance in this thriller earned him the Best Supporting Actor award at the 2024 Hollywood Reel Independent Film Festival.

== Personal life ==
Madsen has a daughter named Jessica Visef (born March 24, 1979) from a relationship with Dana Mechling. He later married Georganne LaPiere, the half-sister of Cher; the two met in 1983, married in 1984, and divorced in 1988. He was married to Jeannine Bisignano from 1991 to 1995, and they had two sons named Christian and Max, both of whom became actors.

In 1996, Madsen married DeAnna Morgan in Ocho Rios while on a break from shooting Donnie Brasco in Jamaica. They lived in Malibu, California, and had three sons named Luke, Kalvin, and Hudson; the last took his own life in January 2022. After 28 years of marriage, Madsen reportedly filed for divorce from Morgan in late 2024; in the filing, he claimed that they had been separated since 2022 after their son Hudson's suicide. However, he took to Instagram to deny that he was filing for divorce.

In February 2022, Madsen was arrested on a misdemeanor trespassing charge in Malibu, California. In August 2024, he was arrested in Malibu on a battery charge after he reportedly assaulted his wife DeAnna Morgan. His bail was set at $20,000. He was released from custody after posting the same bail.

Madsen had a line of hot sauces called American Badass.

=== Charity work ===
In 2002, Madsen received an award for his work with the Shriners Hospital for Children. In September 2009, Madsen announced his participation in the 26th annual Love Ride to help raise money for local charities. Malcolm Forbes, Peter Fonda, Larry Hagman, Billy Idol, Bruce Springsteen, and other celebrities were also scheduled, but the event was canceled due to poor ticket sales and a decline in sponsorship. In November 2016, Madsen hosted a one-night event called An Intimate Evening with Michael Madsen to benefit children's pediatric cancer for Advocate Children's Hospital and the Tyler Robinson Foundation.

=== Death ===
At 8:25 a.m. PDT on July 3, 2025, Madsen was found unresponsive by emergency responders at his home in Malibu, California. He was pronounced dead at the age of 67. The cause of death was confirmed to be heart failure, with heart disease and alcoholism being contributing factors. His ashes were originally retained by his widow DeAnna Morgan before being buried at Mount Sinai Memorial Park.

On August 1, 2025, his frequent collaborator Quentin Tarantino hosted a private memorial service at the Vista Theatre.

== Awards ==
- Lifetime Achievement Award from Red Hen Press in 2006
- 9th Annual Malibu Film Festival honored Madsen in April 2008 for his achievements in the art of acting
- 1999 Firecracker Alternative Book Award for his book of poetry Burning In Paradise
- 2007 Best Actor Boston Film Festival for Strength and Honour
- 2008 Best Actor New York International Independent Film & Video Festival for Strength and Honour
- 2015 Madsen won Ensemble of the Year for The Hateful Eight at the Hollywood Film Awards.
- 2024 – Best Supporting Actor, Hollywood Reel Independent Film Festival, for Dark Feathers: Dance of the Geisha

== Film credits ==
Madsen appeared in over 300 film and television productions since 1982. According to the review aggregator site Rotten Tomatoes and film industry data website The Numbers, his most critically acclaimed and commercially successful films are Kill Me Again (1989), Reservoir Dogs (1992), Straight Talk (1992), Donnie Brasco (1997), Die Another Day (2002), Kill Bill: Volume 2 (2003), Sin City (2005), Scary Movie 4 (2006), The Garden Left Behind (2019), and Once Upon a Time in Hollywood (2019).
