= Garth Craven =

Garth Craven was an English film editor who has worked since the late 1970s on American feature films and television shows.He was born 28 February 1939 in Cleveland, Yorkshire, and died in 2023 in Barcelona. He worked with Sam Peckinpah 6 times and on some the biggest comedies of the 90s and 2000s.

== Filmography ==
Year	Title	Position
1973	Pat Garrett and Billy the Kid	editor
1977	I Never Promised You a Rose Garden (film)	editor
1978	Convoy (1978 film)	editor
1979	Avalanche Express	editor
1980	The Diary of Anne Frank (1980 film)	editor
1982	I, the Jury (1982 film)	editor
1983	Educating Rita (film)	editor
1985	Little Treasure	editor
1986	The Best of Times (1986 film)	editor
1987	Gaby: A True Story	editor, 8 episodes
1988	Shoot to Kill (1988 film)	editor
1989	Third Degree Burn	editor
1989	Turner & Hooch	editor
1991	Soapdish	editor
1994	When a Man Loves a Woman (film)	editor
1995	Restoration (1995 film)	editor
1996	One Fine Day (1996 film)	editor
1997	My Best Friend's Wedding	editor
1999	The Outfitters	editor
1999	A Midsummer Night's Dream (1999 film)	editor
2000	Return to Me	editor
2000	Where the Money Is	editor
2001	What's the Worst That Could Happen?	editor
2001	Legally Blonde	editor
2003	Peter Pan (2003 film)	editor
2005	Miss Congeniality 2: Armed and Fabulous	editor
