= Duncan Gibbins =

British film and music video director (1952–1993)

- Born: 13 October 1952; Jersey, UK
- Died: 3 November 1993 (aged 41); Sherman Oaks, California, U.S.
- Occupations: Film director; music video director
- Years active: 1986–1993

Duncan Gibbins (13 October 1952 – 3 November 1993) was a British film and music video director, as well as a screenwriter. Gibbins was known for his romance and thriller films as well as for the various music videos he directed. Gibbins's first break was with the 1986 release of Fire with Fire, about a young woman who attends a Catholic school and a young man from a nearby prison camp who fall in love and run away together to escape the law, the church and their parents. On 3 November 1993, Gibbins died as a result of third degree burns he received from a fire at the home he was renting. He was 41 years old at the time of his death.

== Early life, family and education ==
Gibbins was born in Jersey on 13 October 1952. He attended The Arthur Terry School, in Sutton Coldfield, Birmingham, where he captained the school football team.

He moved with his family to the West Country & attended Chipping Sodbury Grammar School from 1968-1970 where he passed his A level exams.

== Career ==
He started out his career as an actor on radio, and in television as a reporter for BBC Midlands Today. He decided that he wanted to try journalism but found that he did not much care for it. Before coming to the US in the mid-1980s, he produced and directed a few documentaries for the BBC and made music videos for such groups as the Eurythmics and Wham!. He made his feature-film debut in the US with the 1986 romantic drama film, Fire with Fire in 1986 which starred Craig Sheffer and Virginia Madsen. Gibbins later co-penned the script for Roger Spottiswoode's Third Degree Burn, a made-for-TV movie in 1989. In 1991, Gibbins released Eve of Destruction, an action thriller film starring Gregory Hines about a female scientist who creates a sexy android version of herself and equips it with both the passionate emotions she lacks and also a nuclear bomb, then the trouble begins.

Gibbins made his final film, A Case for Murder in 1993, which starred Jennifer Grey and Peter Berg about a lawyer who gets involved with her partner, then suspects him of murder in a case they are trying together.

== Death ==
On 3 November 1993, Gibbins narrowly escaped a wildfire that was roaring through Malibu, including surrounding mountains and canyons, and was engulfing the home he was renting. Gibbins decided to go back in to rescue a cat that he saw in the burning building. While trying to rescue the cat, he received severe burns. (At school Duncan was an able distance runner, but not a natural sprinter). Having been set on fire, he jumped into his swimming pool. With burns covering 95% of his body, chlorine and other chemicals used to keep the pool sanitized were able to penetrate his blood stream. He was rescued still conscious, still asking about his cat. Gibbins later died at Sherman Oaks Hospital and Health Center's burn unit. Days later, the cat was found unharmed save for a few minor burns.

== Music videos ==
- 1987 – Someone to Love Me for Me – Lisa Lisa and Cult Jam, featuring Full Force
- 1987 – The Hands of Time – Gregg Rolie
- 1987 – It Doesn't Have to Be This Way – the Blow Monkeys
- 1986 – Don't Leave Me This Way – the Communards
- 1985 – Smuggler's Blues – Glenn Frey
- 1985 – Walking on the Chinese Wall – Philip Bailey
- 1984 – Careless Whisper – George Michael
- 1984 – Robert De Niro's Waiting... – Bananarama
- 1984 – Wake Me Up Before You Go-Go [version 2: live] – Wham!
- 1984 – Sexy Girl – Glenn Frey
- 1983 – That Was Then but This Is Now – ABC
- 1983 – Club Tropicana – Wham!
- 1983 – Tell Me Why – Musical Youth
- 1983 – Love to Stay – Altered Images
- 1983 – Who's That Girl? – Eurythmics
- 1983 – Just Got Lucky – JoBoxers

== Feature films ==
- Fire with Fire (1986)
- Third Degree Burn (1989) (screenwriter only)
- Eve of Destruction (1991)
- A Case for Murder (1993) (TV film)
