= Leanne (TV series) =

American sitcom

- Genre: Sitcom
- Created by: Susan McMartin & Chuck Lorre & Leanne Morgan
- Starring: Leanne Morgan; Kristen Johnston; Celia Weston; Blake Clark; Ryan Stiles; Graham Rogers; Hannah Pilkes; Jayma Mays
- Music by: Keb' Mo' and Yolabelle International
- Country of origin: United States
- Original language: English
- No. of seasons: 2
- No. of episodes: 26

Production
- Executive producers: Susan McMartin; Nick Bakay; Leanne Morgan; Judi Marmel; Chuck Lorre
- Producers: Kristy Cecil; Robinson Green
- Cinematography: Steven V. Silver
- Editor: Russell Griffin
- Camera setup: Multi-camera
- Running time: 18–24 minutes
- Production companies: Chuck Lorre Productions; Warner Bros. Television

Original release
- Network: Netflix
- Release: July 31, 2025 – present

Leanne is an American television sitcom created by Susan McMartin, Chuck Lorre, and Leanne Morgan that premiered on Netflix on July 31, 2025. The series stars Morgan, Kristen Johnston, Celia Weston, Blake Clark, Ryan Stiles, Graham Rogers, and Hannah Pilkes. In September 2025, the series was renewed for a second season, which premiered on August 27, 2026.

== Cast and characters ==
=== Main ===
- Leanne Morgan as Leanne, a Knoxville, Tennessee wife and mother whose life is shattered when her husband of 33 years leaves her for another woman
- Kristen Johnston as Carol, Leanne's younger sister, twice-divorced and recently moved back to Knoxville, Tennessee from Chicago
- Celia Weston as Mama Margaret, Leanne and Carol's mother, who often needs them to take care of her
- Blake Clark as Daddy John, Leanne and Carol's father
- Ryan Stiles as Bill, Leanne's husband, owner of 3 RV Emporiums, who is in the process of leaving her for another woman
- Graham Rogers as Tyler, Leanne and Bill's son who is married with a baby son and works for Bill at RV Emporium
- Hannah Pilkes as Josie, Leanne and Bill's free-spirited 30-year-old daughter
- Jayma Mays as Mary (season 2; recurring season 1), Leanne's neighbor and fellow churchgoer

=== Recurring ===
- Annie Gonzalez as Nora, Tyler's wife, who is pregnant again shortly after giving birth to a son
- Blake Gibbons as Dylan, Carol's new plumber boyfriend who is later revealed to be a wanted criminal
- Tim Daly as Andrew, an FBI agent looking for Dylan who becomes Leanne's love interest

== Episodes ==
=== Series overview ===
Season	Episodes	Originally released
1	16	July 31, 2025
2	10	August 27, 2026

=== Season 1 (2025) ===
No. overall	No. in season	Title	Directed by	Teleplay by	Original release date	Prod. code
1	1	"The Important Stuff"	James Widdoes	Written by : Susan McMartin & Chuck Lorre & Leanne Morgan	July 31, 2025	T12.18801
Leanne is stunned to find out her husband of 33 years, Bill, is leaving her for another woman via email. She doesn't want to tell anyone yet except her sister Carol who shows up to cheer her up and son Tyler who drops off his son for Leanne to babysit. Leanne and Carol keep the secret from their church congregation and parents, Mama Margaret and Daddy John who see Bill as the ideal husband. Leanne tells her daughter, Josie, who is also shocked. Later, Bill shows up at the house unannounced to pick up some things and Leanne yells at him for deciding to end the marriage. Bill reveals he is miserable in the marriage. After he leaves, Carol comes back to sleep on the side of the bed where Bill used to sleep along with the CPAP machine.
2	2	"The Healing Magic of Family"	James Widdoes	Nick Bakay & Mark Gross; Story by : Chuck Lorre & Susan McMartin	July 31, 2025	T12.18802
The next morning, Leanne is still mopey and dragging Carol with her. Tyler stops by with a flower bouquet and tries to cheer her up while on his way to work at RV Emporium. When Mama Margaret's Life Alert necklace goes off, Leanne and Carol quickly get dressed and go to the hospital. They find out that she fainted on the kitchen floor. Bill arrives at the hospital as well, because he has Mama's Life Alert necklace notice on his phone. The doctor diagnoses her with low blood pressure and dehydration. Leanne takes her parents in for the night after Mama refuses to stay at the hospital for the night. The family keeps lying to Mama and Daddy about Bill until Leanne gets tired of the lying and reveals that she and Bill are separating. Mama faints and ends up in the hospital again after hearing the news. In the hospital waiting room, Leanne punches Bill after he says that he would always love her.
3	3	"Oh, Knoxville"	James Widdoes	Susan McMartin & Mark Gross; Story by : Chuck Lorre & Nick Bakay	July 31, 2025	T12.18803
Leanne's neighbor Mary, who also goes to her church, brings over a lasagna after hearing about Bill leaving her. Carol encourages Leanne to go out for the night after seeing her depressingly singing and eating the lasagna. Leanne reluctantly gets dressed and hits the bars with Carol. At the bar they chat with some men, but the men ditch Leanne and Carol after coming back from the restrooms. She becomes upset and wants to go home. Meanwhile, Daddy John picks up Bill to talk to him about leaving Leanne and shares marital problems that he had in the past. John crashes his truck along with Bill. John has a suspended license. John and Bill end up in jail and John's truck is in the impound lot. The sisters go to the police station to pick up their father after getting a call from Mama Margaret. Leanne tells Bill she is dating again. They leave Bill at the station.
4	4	"Smooth Like a Dolphin"	James Widdoes	Nick Bakay & Julie Bean; Story by : Chuck Lorre & Susan McMartin	July 31, 2025	T12.18804
Leanne and Carol visit a divorce attorney to work on Leanne's divorce settlement and celebrate with champagne after hearing about the large settlement. Leanne wants to use the settlement for her grandchildren while Carol suggests she uses it for splurging on herself like buying a Cadillac. She picks the Escalade. The sisters go to their parents' house for lunch to reveal that she saw a divorce lawyer. Later that evening at Leanne's, upon hearing a noise downstairs, Leanne grabs a shotgun and Carol takes a knife downstairs. Leanne threatens to shoot and Bill tells them that they should. He tells her that he wants her back. She tells him to get out, but Bill is too drunk to drive. So, she lets him stay the night on the couch, but tells him he needs to leave before the sun comes up or she shoots. The following morning, she gets her shotgun and fires it after finding Bill showering in the bathroom. Later, the entire family comes over to watch college football. Bill shows up unannounced with the keys to an Escalade. The family tries to convince Leanne to consider taking him back. His mistress announces that she is pregnant and Mama tells Leanne to let him go.
5	5	"A Plumber Sent from Heaven"	James Widdoes	Susan McMartin & Julie Bean; Story by : Chuck Lorre & Nick Bakay	July 31, 2025	T12.18805
Leanne tries to get a revenge body by working out and limiting her food intake. She sneaks into the kitchen to eat and runs into a man named Dylan who reveals to be Carol's new boyfriend. She asks how they met the following morning. Carol says they met while she was choking on beef at Korean BBQ restaurant and Dylan gave her the Heimlich maneuver. She calls him her hero, but Dylan says it was not a big deal since he is a plumber. Daddy John calls Leanne because Mama Margaret needs a bath. Leanne and Carol asks Dylan to install a walk-in tub for Mama. He agrees to install it. Daddy announces that he likes Dylan after talking to him about his intentions with Carol while Dylan explains the walk-in installation process. Bill shows up to finally install the walk-in tub and they tell him it was already done by Dylan. So, Bill leaves. Mama posts pictures of Dylan installing the tub all over social media and Dylan insists she takes them down. He leaves abruptly. Later, the sisters find out that he cleared out his apartment.
6	6	"Too Much Wedding Ring"	Andy Ackerman	Mark Gross & Julie Bean; Story by : Susan McMartin & Nick Bakay	July 31, 2025	T12.18806
FBI agent Andrew knocks on Leanne's front door and asks for Carol. Andrew says it is about her missing boyfriend Dylan whose real surname is McQuaide. Leanne flirts with Andrew and he reciprocates. As Andrew leaves, he tells the sisters to give him a call if they find anything helpful. Leanne throws a gender reveal party for Tyler and Nora. While getting ready for the party, she sneaks into the bathroom to call Andrew and leaves a voicemail. Daddy John cuts the gender reveal cake and tells Leanne they are having a girl after he got tired of waiting for Leanne. Leanne goes to Andrew's office to give a hairbrush that Dylan used. Andrew says that it doesn't help. As she leaves, Andrew asks her out for a date. While getting ready for the date, she has second thoughts about going. Carol and Josie reassures that she would be fine and tell her to take off her wedding ring. On the date, Andrew reveals that he has been divorced twice. He never wants to get married again and Leanne feels that same. At the end of the night, Andrew says that he is looking forward to a second date and kisses her on the cheeks. Bill sees that and leaves.
7	7	"Please Be a Lizard"	Kristy Cecil	Susan McMartin & John "Jack" O'Brien; Story by : Nick Bakay & Anne Flett-Giordano	July 31, 2025	T12.18807
Leanne is out jogging and Mary makes her spill the beans about the man she is dating. Leanne is smitten with Andrew while Carol is depressed about Dylan. Leanne goes to see her gynecologist for her a routine check-up. She is concerned about her pelvic floor issues. At home, Josie comes over to give Carol a safe to keep her box containing a vape pen, edibles, pills, and mini tequila bottles. At the doctor's office, she runs into Bill's baby mama Faye. Faye asks to grab coffee to talk and Leanne declines. Leanne becomes very angry at Faye. She changes her mind and meets up with Faye to give her a piece of her mind. She finds out Faye is the dentist she sent Bill to see for a root canal. Faye says Bill is only with her because of the baby and he really wants to be with Leanne. Leanne tells Faye that she has moved on and Bill is all hers. Meanwhile, Carol gets high with Bill in the gargage from Josie's edibles. Bill is upset that Leanne is dating Andrew because he still loves her. Carols tells him to get over himself and just be happy for Leanne.
8	8	"Muscle Memory"	Kristy Cecil	Nick Bakay & Amy Hubbs; Story by : Susan McMartin & Alexandra Melnick	July 31, 2025	T12.18808
At the workout class, Mary hounds Leanne about Andrew as she sees everything on her Ring camera. Leanne has yet to kiss him and Carol makes fun of her. Leanne wants to kiss him, but wants it to be perfect. That night, Leanne quickly gets out of his car and asks him to leave because she is having hot flashes and is embarrassed. Bill comes over the next morning to pick up his passport for his work trip. They kiss unexpectedly as they say goodbyes. Leanne says it is just muscle memory and nothing more as Carol saw the kiss. That night, Carol drives her parents and Tyler to the movies to watch a rom-com. John is less than enthusiastic. Meanwhile, Leanne is on a date with Andrew. Leanne hesitates to kiss Andrew because she is afraid to get into a relationship and experience heartbreak later and she doesn't want that to happen again. He is ok with Leanne not being ready for a relationship. Mary comes over to discuss how Carol's kiss made her realizes how much she is starved for affection since her husband Jerry died. Mary drunkenly kisses Tyler when he walks her home. Leanne shows up at Andrew's house and kisses him.
9	9	"Chipmunk in the Drywall"	Rhiannon O'Harra	Mark Gross & Anne Flett-Giordano; Story by : Susan McMartin & Nick Bakay	July 31, 2025	T12.18809
At church, Leanne tells Carol that she can't stop thinking about Andrew. Mary acts weird at church due to remembering her kiss with Tyler. Mama Margaret is out of town to visit Aunt Ruth. Daddy John gets to ditch church when Mama is out of town. Leanne tells him about Andrew. Carol gets upset when Daddy gives Grandma's Loretta bunny china to Leanne instead of her. Daddy tells her it is because Leanne has a family and she doesn't. Carol argues that it is because Leanne is his favorite. Daddy gives Carol a bag of 3,000 pennies. The sisters get into an argument after Carol feels that she never takes her side. Carol leaves Leanne's house to go back to her apartment. Meanwhile, Mary keeps harassing Tyler about the kiss as she assumes Carol knows and needs to get ahead of it before everyone finds out. Leanne tells Daddy that he is too hard on Carol and says that Carol has always been there for her, but she has not thank her enough. Leanne apologizes to Carol for not standing up for her and wants her to move back in. Carol accepts her apology and moves back to Leanne's.
10	10	"Apology Pie"	Nick Bakay	Susan McMartin & Julie Bean; Story by : Amy Hubbs & John "Jack" O'Brien	July 31, 2025	T12.18810
Leanne leaves Bill a voicemail telling him to pick up his mail, change his mailing address, and sign the divorce papers because she wants to move on with her life. During trivia night, Andrew tells Leanne that his father just died apathetically when he receives a text message. Leanne is shocked to see he doesn't care about his father dying and talks to Carol about it. The sisters think about the possibilities why he feels that way. Leanne is determined to get to the bottom of it. Bill finally picks up his mail and Leanne badgers him to sign the divorce papers. Leanne makes deal with him by agreeing to give some family photo albums if he signs the divorce papers. Bill accepts the deal. On their next date, Leanne tries to get Andrew to open up to her. Andrew tells her he doesn't have a good relationship with her father so, he is not going to the funeral and asks her to let it go. She ignores Andrew's wishes and goes to the funeral with Carol. Meanwhile, Bill drives Daddy John to his eye appointment because he couldn't get ahold of Leanne. The sisters run into Andrew at the funeral. Andrew explains to Leanne when he was a cop he arrested his father's brother because he was a con man. His father, who was also a cop, chose to look the other way. But, he couldn't so, he chose the badge over family. On their way, Leanne realizes that she forgot to take Daddy John to his eye appointment. Bill tells Leanne that the divorce papers are signed while Leanne is baking a pie for Daddy. Leanne hands over a photo album to Bill.
11	11	"Dog Day Afternoon"	Nikki Lorre	Nick Bakay & Anne Flett-Giordano; Story by : Susan McMartin & Matthew McGeehan	July 31, 2025	T12.18811
Andrew arrives late to meet Leanne's parents because he was arresting Dylan. Carol asks what he did. Andrew says Dylan robbed banks and he has been chasing Dylan for years. He was a ghost until he showed up on Mama's Facebook page. Andrew leaves for work immediately as they need him to interview Dylan. Leanne asks Andrew do her favor by setting Carol up to meet with Dylan to give Carol some closure after seeing how depressed Carol is. As soon as Carol sees Dylan, she smacks him repeatedly. Dylan admits that he lied about almost everything. The sisters go home after Leanne refuses to let Carol make more bad choices. Then, Leanne takes Andrew to her parents' house for dinner and Daddy badgers Andrew about the reward. After discussing what Dylan did for them, Andrew takes a look of the dry wall in the bathroom and discovers things that Andrew stolen are in there. Since it is a crime scene, Leanne's parents can't be there so, Leanne offers to house them temporarily. Andrew says he will look into the reward money more. Daddy says he likes him. Carol convinces herself that Dylan really loves her and is fine to be a prison wife.
12	12	"The Queen's Dilemma"	Nikki Lorre	Mark Gross & Julie Bean & Kelly Farrell; Story by : Susan McMartin & Nick Bakay & Anne Flett-Giordano	July 31, 2025	T12.18812
The next morning, Leanne complains about having no hot water for a shower. Mary rings Leanne's doorbell to let her know that she is rebooting her book club and expects Leanne and Carol to be there. The sisters go to Mary's house for her book club. Mary bores the ladies with a prolonged review of The Queen's Dilemma. When it is Leanne's turn, she admits that she didn't read the book and glad she didn't because it is about a woman who can feel only whole if she has a man with her and thinks it is a bunch of hooey. The book club turns into the ladies sharing their own problems. Leanne asserts that they are the real queens. Carol is thinking about ending things with Dylan. One the ladies, Becca stops by and lets her know that she is a hit on Instagram with her female empowerment speech. Later, Mama Margaret announces that she is leaving Daddy John. The sisters agree to lie to their parents so that they will to be back together.
13	13	"Don't Dangle a Dream"	Nikki Lorre	Amy Hubbs & Anne Flett-Giordano; Story by : Susan McMartin & Julie Bean	July 31, 2025	T12.18813
Leanne, Carol, and Mama Margaret make baked goods for their church's bake sale. Josie decides to sell her bridesmaid dresses on EBay or burn them if they don't sell. She says people in Knoxville only get married and have babies. Mama Margaret tells Josie her time will come. She also says she never had a wedding and describes her dream wedding. Leanne ropes Carol into throwing a wedding for their parents at Leanne's place. Mama Margaret is excited whereas Daddy John is not interested. Mama wants to do the wedding the following Saturday. She demands that Josie to be the flower girl and Tyler as the ring bearer much to their chagrin. Carol hires funeral director Stephen for the flower arrangements because she couldn't find a florist due to short notice. On the big day, Stephen tells Leanne that his vendor sent them funeral flower arrangements instead of the wedding ones. The wedding begins to fall apart. Leanne tells everyone that we are going to adapt and pivot. Mama thanks Leanne and Carol for making her dream come true. Josie tells Leanne that she has no desire to get marry ever and wants to leave Knoxville.
14	14	"Gomez Is a Woman"	Nikki Lorre	Susan McMartin & Mark Gross; Story by : Nick Bakay & Julie Bean	July 31, 2025	T12.18814
Josie shows Leanne and Carol information about the collective farm in California that she is moving to. Carol tells Leanne she needs to let Josie go. When Bill comes over to give Josie survival gear, he blames Leanne for smothering Josie. Leanne meets Andrew's FBI partner Gomez during her lunch date with Andrew. Gomez happens to be a single attractive woman without any kids. Leanne feels very insecure and tells Carol about her lunch date and Gomez. After some meditation and tea, Leanne realizes she is blowing it out of proportion a bit. Carol assures Leanne that Andrew is locked in. The next date, Andrew and Leanne get into a brief argument about Leanne not trusting him with Gomez. The ladies at Zumba class try to get into Leanne's head. Carol reassures her that she doesn't think Andrew is going to cheat on her and tells her jealousy is making her super unattractive. While waiting for Josie, Bill apologizes to Leanne about blaming her for Josie leaving. Bill and Leanne say their goodbyes to Josie at the airport. Andrew agrees to take a lie detector test. He reveals he loves her and it is the truth.
15	15	"Spiritual Airbags"	Nikki Lorre	Nick Bakay & Anne Flett-Giordano; Story by : Susan McMartin & John "Jack" O'Brien	July 31, 2025	T12.18815
As the sisters are driving home from church, their car is t-boned by Mary who is driving Jerry's car. The sisters can't sleep that night because they are still shaken from the accident. Carol feels the need to change her ways to be more kind and perform good acts because she assumes her bad karma caused the accident. When Bill comes over to check on them, Leanne states that she doesn't want Bill to be buried next to her in their burial plot. They get into an argument over it. Leanne officially makes Carol her emergency contact. Mary comes over crying about Jerry's car being totaled. She reveals the she hasn't moved nor gotten rid of anything of Jerry's. The sisters try to make her feel better, tell her she needs to let go of Jerry's things to allow her for an opportunity to change, and offer to help her. While helping Mary get rid of some of Jerry's things. Carol realizes when she dies, no one would care since she feels her life has no meaning to anyone. After seeing Carol is still depressed, Leanne reassures her again about how much everyone would care and Carol feels a lot better. Later, Leanne tells Bill that he can keep his burial plot if Carol can be buried in between them.
16	16	"Having Big Feelings"	Nikki Lorre	Mark Gross & Amy Hubbs; Story by : Susan McMartin & Julie Bean	July 31, 2025	T12.18816
During a date, Andrew says he is taking Leanne for a weekend getaway. Leanne is not thrilled about it because she feels insecure about the trip. To get ready for the romantic getaway, Carol accompanies Leanne to the mall for Leanne to get a wax, a spray tan, and a bathing suit. As Andrew and Leanne are on their way to their getaway, Leanne looks uncomfortable. Bill stops by while Leanne is away for Josie's old crib. Bill is shocked to learn that Leanne is very serious with Andrew. Meanwhile, Leanne and Andrew become very awkward around each other, but eventually they get over it and have fun. Carol dials 9-1-1 when Bill says he is having chest pain. Tyler calls Leanne to tell her that Nora is in labor and they need her. As Leanne and Andrew are driving back home, she receives a call from Carol about Bill's chest pain. The family learn that Bill just had a panic attack as the couple arrives. Leanne and Bill have a heart-to-heart conversation about their failed marriage. Nora gives birth to a baby girl and the family comes together.

=== Season 2 (2026) ===
No. overall	No. in season	Title	Directed by	Teleplay by	Original release date	Prod. code
17	1	"The Big Hm-Hm"	Nikki Lorre	Mark Gross & Julie Bean; Story by : Nick Bakay & Chuck Lorre	August 27, 2026	T12.19601
While Leanne and Carol talk about Leanne turning 60 the next day, Mama Margaret comes over to Leanne's house unannounced and tells the sisters that their father is missing. Leanne drives Mama and Carol looking for Daddy John. Meanwhile, Daddy is struggling using the self-checkout at the store. Later, Mama reveals that Daddy may have gone to the dollar store. As it turns out, the sisters find Daddy at the dollar store still struggling with the self-checkout. Leanne drives her parents home along with Carol. As they approach their house, they realize their house has caught on fire due to forgetting to turn off the stove. Due to the kitchen being unusable, Leanne lets her parents stay at her house. Carol and Leanne disagree with how they want to take care of their aging parents. Carol wants to put them in an independent assisted living facility whereas Leanne wants to take care of them herself. Leanne gives in when Carol talks her into it. The sisters trick their parents into looking at independent assisted living facilities. At the last minute, Leanne backs out on placing her parents in the facility as she realizes that she can't do that to her parents.
18	2	"A Prison of Love"	Nikki Lorre	Nick Bakay & Amy Hubbs; Story by : Mark Gross & Julie Bean	August 27, 2026	T12.19602
Faye dumps Bill again after hearing Bill saying "I love you, Leanne" while he is on laughing gas at the dental office. Mama Margaret and Daddy John do not want to stay at Leanne's anymore and want to go back to their own home. Bill laid everyone off at RV Emporium while still high on laughing gas. Leanne shows up at RV Emporium after Tyler calls her for help. Leanne drives Bill home and tells him to apologize to Faye. Meanwhile, Mama and Daddy try to steal Carol's car after Carol and Leanne took their car keys from them to stop them from leaving. They tell Carol they don't want to live at Leanne's house because it means they lose their freedom of being independent. When Bill refuses to apologize to Faye, Leanne drives back to her own home and leaves him in the car. Mama and Daddy convince Bill to go back and apologize to Faye. When Faye refuses to take Bill back, Leanne storms into Faye's dental office and demands she take Bill back. After Faye‘s water breaks, Leanne takes her to the hospital and Faye gives birth to a baby.
19	3	"The Old Cat Had Her Reasons"	Nikki Lorre	Amy Hubbs & John "Jack" O'Brien; Story by : Nick Bakay & Julie Bean	August 27, 2026	T12.19603
After being away for work for three months, Andrew proposes to Leanne during their date night and Leanne tells him she is going to have to get back to him. Carol reassures Leanne it is Andrew's fault that he proposed this early. Leanne announces during book club that Andrew proposed to her. Carol defends Leanne when the ladies question why she didn't say yes and she and the book club ladies agree it is basically a no. On their next date night, Leanne says yes to Andrew. Before bed, Leanne tells Carol she said yes to Andrew and the sisters get into an argument about how Leanne can't be alone. Later, Leanne realizes she doesn't want to get married for now and proposes to Andrew that they just keep dating. Andrew says he needs to get back to her. When Leanne tells Carol she’s not sure how she feels about she and Andrew taking a break, Carol reassures her that she’s going to be okay because she chose herself.
20	4	"Fit as a Fiddle"	Nikki Lorre	Mark Gross & John "Jack" O'Brien; Story by : Nick Bakay & Julie Bean	August 27, 2026	T12.19604
Leanne tracks Daddy John and realizes he never went to his doctor's appointment. As soon as he walks in the door, he lies to Leanne and Carol about going to the doctor's. Leanne decides to chaperone Daddy to all his doctor's appointments and coordinates all his appointments with Mama Margaret's appointments. She drags Carol in to help her. Leanne takes Daddy to his doctor's appointment while Carol fills out forms for Mama's doctor's appointment. Daddy's doctor hands over an advanced medical care directive pamphlet and forms to Leanne so she and Daddy can agree on his medical care moving forward. Meanwhile, Carol and Mama miss one of Mama‘s doctor's appointments. Leanne gets upset while asking Daddy the advanced medical care directive questions as it is about dying. Daddy reassures her that is way down the road.
21	5	"Big Hammer Energy"	Nikki Lorre	Mark Gross & Julie Bean; Story by : Amy Hubbs & John "Jack" O'Brien	August 27, 2026	T12.19605
Bill helps with remodeling Mama Margaret and Daddy John's kitchen. Leanne is not happy about it because Bill is not a licensed contractor. At the Rocky Top Hardware store, Leanne, Daddy, and Bill look at kitchen cabinets. Carol and Mama are in the garden section when they are supposed to be looking at sinks and Mama tries to set Carol up with an employee there. Leanne becomes upset after realizing Daddy picked out different tiles than the ones they had agreed upon. She wants to sell the house but Daddy doesn't want to. Carol works on Mama and Daddy’s garden after agreeing to at the store but quits immediately when Mama micromanages how she gardens. Leanne smashes a wall to blow off steam after Bill tells her to do that. She gets turned on when Bill takes off his zip-up hoodie. Later, Leanne has a wet dream about Bill. The next day, Leanne gets her hair done by her hair stylist Kimi (Jaime Pressly). Kimi tells her having a wet dream about an ex is never "black and white" while Mary eavesdrops on their conversation. Mama apologizes to Carol. Leanne goes to her parents' house and kisses Bill, but feels nothing.
22	6	"An Enhancement... Or Two"	Nick Bakay	Julie Bean & Alexandra Melnick; Story by : Nick Bakay & Amy Hubbs	August 27, 2026	T12.19607
Leanne becomes upset after realizing she is no longer "hot" anymore when men keep ignoring her at the store. Carol enjoys being invisible at the store because she gets free food samples from a man multiple times without him noticing. After seeing an acquaintance's plastic surgery results at the hair salon, Leanne and Mary book consultations with a plastic surgeon in Nashville. Carol is concerned that Leanne may get addicted to plastic surgery. Leanne drives alongside Carol and Mary from Knoxville to Nashville for their consultation. Mary is planning to get a boob job. Daddy John asks Bill to fix the sink when his poker game didn't work out. Bill comes over with his newborn son and Daddy ends up helping him with taking care of his son. During Leanne's consultation, Carol is interested in getting plastic surgery when the doctor gives his input on how she would look after getting work done. As the sisters and Mary are on their way home, Carol and Mary go to get food and Leanne realizes she doesn't want to get plastic surgery after all. When Mary and Carol come back to the car, Mary ends up backing out as well. Carol becomes upset after Leanne and Mary decided not to get plastic surgery.
23	7	"Pickles are Forever"	Nick Bakay	Amy Hubbs & John "Jack" O'Brien; Story by : Nick Bakay & Mark Gross	August 27, 2026	T12.19608
Bill is secretly sleeping in Leanne's old bedroom at Mama Margaret and Daddy John's house. He gets up in the morning and pretends to just walk into the house. Bill tries to convince Leanne get the rest of the house remodeled so that he can continue secretly living there. Carol finds Daddy's will and Leanne says they need to talk to a lawyer. The sisters bring their parents to talk to an estate planning attorney. The attorney recommends drawing up a trust. Daddy disagrees because he doesn't want his daughters to co-own the house while he is still alive. Leanne refuses to apologize to Daddy. Leanne marches into VFW to yell at Daddy and didn't go her way. Later, Leanne demands an apology from Daddy since she just trying to help. Daddy storms out and goes back to his house where he discovers Bill living there. Daddy is fine with Bill living there with his son because he says it is a family house, which is what it’s supposed to be. They talk it out about the house and Leanne. The next morning, Daddy comes back to Leanne and says he made an appointment with the lawyer. During the appointment, Daddy announces that Bill gets to live in his house as long as he needs, to which Leanne reluctantly agrees.
24	8	"Have a Rocky Top Day"	Nick Bakay	Nick Bakay & Julie Bean; Story by : John "Jack" O'Brien & Kelly Farrell	August 27, 2026	T12.19609
Mama Margaret tells Carol that she set up a date with the guy from Rocky Top Hardware store. Carol is upset about it. So, she goes to the store with Leanne to tell that man that she is letting him off the hook. He says that he is actually is interested in a date with her. Meanwhile, Leanne runs in Andrew at the store. They briefly talk to catch up. On their way home, Leanne debates whether to reach to Andrew or not. Carol tells Leanne she is going on a date with the guy from the store. As soon they get home, they see that their cousin Jessie is there. Jessie let Leanne know that she and Mike broke up. Carol gets Mama out of there so, they can talk. Jessie says the Mike cheated on her with Donna Davenport. She says that she is so upset about it that she drove straight to Leanne's house. Later, Leanne tells her that she can let go of the relationship, but not half of the diner that she owns. Jessie tells her that she does not want to go back ever again. Leanne tells Jessie that she needs to fight or else she would regret it later and Carol is going to help her. Jessie confronts Mike at the diner with Leanne and Carol there. Mike apologizes to her and says he cheated because she cheated first. She claims technically she wasn't cheating because they were broken up after he failed to propose to her. They make up. Leanne decides to reach to Andrew by showing at doorstep, but he isn't home. She leaves message on his doorbell camera.
25	9	"Three Degrees of Southern Women"	Nick Bakay	Mark Gross & John "Jack" O'Brien; Story by : Julie Bean & Amy Hubbs	August 27, 2026	T12.19610
Carol walks in with a smile on her face after her another date with Clint, the guy from the hardware store. Leanne asks Carol to ask Clint to set her up with someone because she says she needs to get of the house and want spend less time with Mama Margaret. Clint introduces Leanne to Dutch (Billy Gardell), a wealthy man in the urinal cake business. The sisters discover that Clint is a father to a 9-year-old kid. Leanne believes Dutch is arrogant and Carol is surprised that Clint is a dad. They agree to get through dinner fast. Dutch is rude to the waiter when the waiter drops his steak. Leanne is upset, but agrees to go on second date with him. The next day, Mama and Leanne visit the hair salon. Leanne makes a scene because Kimi isn't there and another hair stylist styles Mama to something she didn't ask for. Leanne demands to get it fixed. Meanwhile, Bill is helping Daddy with his driver's test. Mama is disappointed in Leanne about how she behaved at the hair salon and she should have restrained herself. Carol is on a date with Clint and his son at the arcade while Leanne is on a second date with Dutch at a restaurant. Dutch wants to leave the date early and Leanne is not even upset about it. Suddenly, Dutch says that he's driven away everyone he loves. Leanne reassures him that he can find the right person, but it isn't her. Daddy ends up failing the driver's test.
26	10	"Bang Me"	Kristy Cecil	Nick Bakay & Kelly Farrell; Story by : Mark Gross & Amy Hubbs	August 27, 2026	T12.19606
Leanne goes to see Kimi and demands getting bangs. Kimi asks Leanne what led her to the point of wanting to get bangs. Leanne tells Kimi it is the anniversary of Bill leaving her via email. That day, she storms into the RV Emporium and calls Bill out using a microphone. She ends up pigging out with junk food in her car. Then, Carol and Leanne spray paint a bench ad of Bill's. In a flashback, Leanne reveals that she drove to Chicago to pick up Carol, so that Carol could be there for her when Bill left. She remembers how Carol was willing to put her life on hold for her. They drive all night to get back to Knoxville from Chicago. Carol ends up staying in Knoxville for good. Leanne remembers a time when Josie senses how Bill and Leanne have nothing in common anymore. Leanne suddenly decides not to get bangs anymore and Kimi tells her that she's perfect the way she is. Then, Leanne goes home and tells Carol how much she appreciates her. Leanne also says she will take 23% responsibility for her and Bill's marriage falling apart. Bill visits Kimi and tells her that he wants to dye his hair black. Kimi lets him talk it out, as she did for Leanne.

== Production ==
=== Development ===
On April 25, 2024, Netflix gave production a 16-episode series order for an untitled multi-cam sitcom. The untitled sitcom is created by Leanne Morgan, Chuck Lorre, and Susan McMartin who are expected to executive produce alongside Judi Marmel. Production companies involved producing the series are Chuck Lorre Productions and Warner Bros. Television. On May 28, 2025, the formerly untitled sitcom is given the title Leanne. Later, Nick Bakay was added as executive producer. On September 8, 2025, Netflix renewed the series for a second season.

=== Casting ===
Upon the series order announcement, Morgan was also set to star. On May 9, 2024, Kristen Johnston joined cast as a series regular. Celia Weston, Blake Clark, Ryan Stiles, Graham Rogers, and Hannah Pilkes are part of the starring cast with Tim Daly, Jayma Mays, Annie Gonzalez and Blake Gibbons to recur.

== Release ==
Leanne premiered on July 31, 2025, with all 16 episodes. The second season was released on August 27, 2026, with all 10 episodes.

== Reception ==
The review aggregator website Rotten Tomatoes reported a 74% approval rating based on 23 critic reviews. The website's critics consensus reads, "Harkening back to classic sitcoms and carried by Leanne Morgan's sheer likability, Leanne is as comfy to watch as hanging out on the couch." Metacritic, which uses a weighted average, gave a score of 62 out of 100 based on 12 critics, indicating "generally favorable".
