= Christian Madsen =

American actor

- Occupation: Actor
- Years active: 2007–present
- Father: Michael Madsen
- Relatives: Elaine Madsen (grandmother)

Christian Madsen is an American actor. He is best known for his roles in the films Palo Alto (2013) and Divergent (2014).

== Life and career ==
Christian Madsen was born to Jeannine (née Bisignano) and Michael Madsen. He began acting at the age of ten, when he appeared in a small role in one of his father's films, and spent time on the set of a number of other films, including Free Willy and The Getaway. His grandmother, filmmaker Elaine Madsen, encouraged him to pursue a career in acting after watching his performances in high school theater. His parents divorced when he was a child and he subsequently "bounced around a lot" between his parents' homes in Malibu, the San Fernando Valley, Santa Fe, and Montana. He eventually moved in with his grandmother when he was 17, and she took him to the Actors Studio and introduced him to the head of its Hollywood branch, Martin Landau.

Madsen's early film career consisted mainly of small roles with his father and independent films. He took on other jobs while continuing to audition for acting roles. He had been auditioning without any successes for over two years and was about to be evicted from his Los Angeles apartment when he won a role in Divergent, a film adaptation of Veronica Roth's young adult novel of the same name.

After filming Divergent, Madsen was cast in the lead role of the independent film Prism, in which he plays a young man who is reunited with his amnesiac father after 15 years. In 2013, he also appeared in Palo Alto, a drama film directed by Gia Coppola, and he has been cast in Jack Squared.

== Filmography ==
=== Film ===
| Year | Title | Role | Notes |
|---|---|---|---|
| 2008 | Eyes Front | Sam | Video |
| 2009 | Lost in the Woods | FBI Agent #1 | |
| 2009 | Clear Lake, WI | Warrior | |
| 2010 | Now Here | Travis Pratt | |
| 2011 | The Brazen Bull | Billy | |
| 2011 | In Time | Dayton Citizen Leader | |
| 2012 | Refuge from the Storm | Sam | |
| 2012 | The Lovers | Samuel Basrico | Short |
| 2013 | Palo Alto | Anthony | |
| 2013 | Jake Squared | Grip | |
| 2014 | Divergent | Albert | |
| 2015 | King Jack | Tom | |
| 2015 | Prism | Bryan | |
| 2016 | Manson's Lost Girls | Tex Watson | TV movie |
| 2016 | Mr. Church | Eddie Larson | |
| 2017 | Odious | Joe McNeal | |
| 2019 | Red Handed | Duffy | |
| 2020 | Dinner With Grandma | Jack | Short |
| 2021 | Free Bird | Man | Short |
| 2023 | The Other Side of Fortune | Brett | Short |

=== Television ===
| Year | Title | Role | Notes |
|---|---|---|---|
| 2018–22 | The Family Business | Vinnie Dash | Guest: Season 1, Recurring Cast: Season 4 |
