= The Debtors =

1999 film

- Directed by: Evi Quaid
- Written by: Cash Bartlett
- Produced by: Evi Quaid; Randy Quaid
- Starring: Michael Caine; Randy Quaid; Scott Wilson; Udo Kier; Catherine McCormack; Jamie Kennedy
- Cinematography: Eric Alan Edwards
- Edited by: William S. Scharf
- Music by: Simon Boswell
- Release dates: September 1999 (TIFF); April 24, 2023 (Digital release)
- Country: United States
- Language: English

The Debtors is an American comedy film starring Michael Caine, Randy Quaid, Udo Kier, Catherine McCormack, Scott Atkinson, and Scott Wilson and directed by Evi Quaid.

The film had its world premiere at the 1999 Toronto International Film Festival. Because of legal issues the film was not officially released until April 24, 2023 when it had a digital release. Comedian Jamie Kennedy, released some film clips on his social media platforms, revealed he also made an appearance in the film.

== Plot ==
People with various addictions meet up at the tables in Las Vegas.

The German band Rammstein has a cameo in the movie, playing the songs "Tier" and "Bück dich".
