= Jake Squared =

- Directed by: Howard Goldberg
- Written by: Howard Goldberg
- Produced by: Elias Koteas; Howard Goldberg; David K. Wilson
- Starring: Elias Koteas; Virginia Madsen; Mike Vogel; Jennifer Jason Leigh; Jane Seymour; Gia Mantegna; Christian Madsen
- Cinematography: Adam Bricker
- Edited by: Michael Swingler
- Music by: Daniel Adam Day
- Distributed by: Freestyle Releasing
- Release dates: September 27, 2013 (Raindance Film Festival); August 15, 2014
- Running time: 100 minutes
- Country: United States
- Language: English
- Box office: $2,592

Jake Squared is a 2013 comedy drama film directed by Howard Goldberg, and starring Elias Koteas, Virginia Madsen, Mike Vogel, Jane Seymour, Jennifer Jason Leigh and Gia Mantegna. It was filmed in Hollywood.

== Plot ==
A filmmaker sets out to make a new project in order to figure out how he's screwed up every relationship he's ever had. The filming spirals out of his control and he winds up having what's either a mystical experience, a nervous breakdown, or both, as his past selves and loves literally and hysterically catch up with him.

== Reception ==
The review aggregator Rotten Tomatoes reports a 22% approval rating, based on nine reviews with an average score of 4.75/10.
