= Leanne Morgan =

American comedian and actress

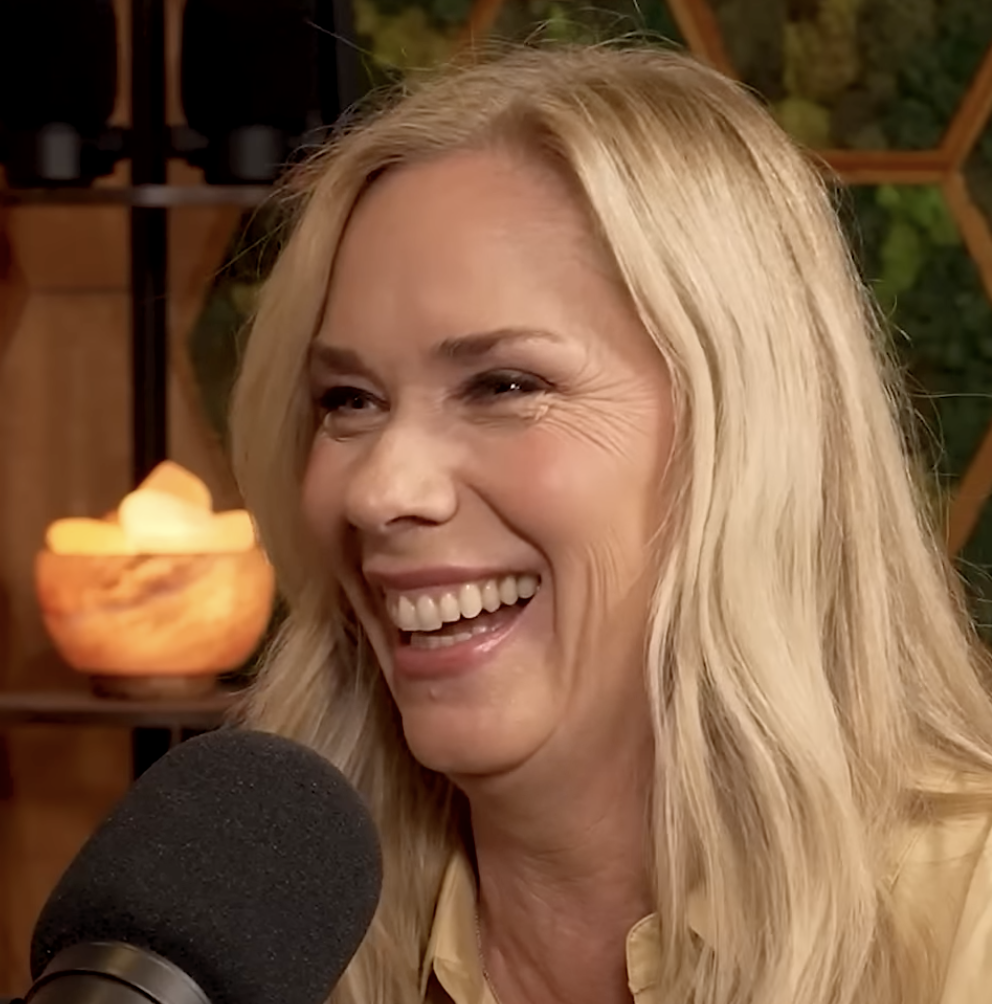
- Morgan in 2025
- Born: 1965 (age 60–61); Tennessee, U.S.
- Education: University of Tennessee
- Occupations: Comedian, actress, writer
- Years active: 2000-present
- Spouse: Chuck Morgan
- Children: 3
- Website: leannemorgan.com

Leanne Morgan (born 1964 or 1965) is an American comedian, actress and author. Her 2023 comedy special Leanne Morgan: I'm Every Woman was in the top ten comedy specials on Netflix. She made her film debut as Gwyneth in the 2025 romantic comedy film You're Cordially Invited. Morgan is the writer, executive producer, co-creator, and starring actress in the 2025 television sitcom Leanne.

== Personal life ==
Leanne Morgan was born Leanne Fletcher. She grew up in a small farming town, Adams, Tennessee, where her parents ran a meat processing business. Morgan graduated from Jo Byrns High School in 1983 and went on to attend the University of Tennessee. After leaving the University of Tennessee, she got married at the age of 21, but the relationship ended soon after because it became abusive. She returned to the University of Tennessee after her first marriage ended and, at the age of 26, she married her now husband, Chuck Morgan, whom she met working at Grady’s restaurant in Knoxville, TN. Once she become a mother, she wanted to have an extra source of income, so she started selling jewelry at in-home shows and worked on an hour of comedy. Her family then moved to Bean Station, Tennessee, where Chuck owned and operated a used mobile home business. Leanne and her family later moved to San Antonio, Texas and then Knoxville, Tennessee. She and her husband have a son and two daughters.

== Career ==
Staying busy after having her first baby, Morgan worked as a jewelry saleswoman. While making door-to-door sales, she began talking about motherhood and making jokes with clients who related to her jokes; they eventually began booking her for comedy gigs. Her first comedy special on YouTube had over 5 million views by 2023. Her 2023 comedy special Leanne Morgan: I'm Every Woman was in the top ten comedy specials on Netflix.

On September 24, 2024, Morgan released her first book, What in the World?! A Southern Woman's Guide to Laughing at Life's Unexpected Curveballs and Beautiful Blessings. In 2025, she played the role of Gwyneth in the romantic comedy film You're Cordially Invited. Leanne, a sitcom based on her stand-up, debuted July 31, 2025.

== Filmography ==
Year	Title	Role	Notes
2020	Leanne Morgan: All Daughters Are Mean	Herself	Dry Bar Comedy special
2023	Leanne Morgan: I'm Every Woman	Herself	Netflix special
2025	You're Cordially Invited	Gwyneth	film
2025–present	Leanne	Leanne	Television series; main role, also co-creator, executive producer, writer
2025	Leanne Morgan: Unspeakable Things	Herself	Netflix special
2027	The Comeback King †	TBA	Filming
