= Warren Skaaren =

American screenwriter (1946–1990)

- Born: March 9, 1946; Rochester, Minnesota, U.S.
- Died: December 28, 1990 (aged 44); Austin, Texas, U.S.
- Education: Rice University
- Occupations: Screenwriter; film producer
- Spouse: Helen Griffin (m. 1969)

Warren Skaaren (March 9, 1946 – December 28, 1990) was an American screenwriter and film producer.

== Career ==
Skaaren was appointed by Governor Preston Smith as executive director of the newly formed Texas Film Commission on December 9, 1970. His first success was getting the film The Getaway (1972) shot in Texas. Skaaren later formed FPS Inc., a television and film productions services company in Dallas. The company handled location shooting for the television series Dallas and worked on the film Tender Mercies (1983). Meanwhile, he was pivotal behind the distribution of The Texas Chain Saw Massacre (1974), to which he claimed credit for crafting the film's title. The success of the film enabled Skaaren to leave the Film Commission and begin his career in the film industry.

In 1983, Skaaren was approached by a Texas businessman to write a script about the Gurkhas, who were Nepalese soldiers serving in the British Army. He spent one year writing the spec script titled Of East and West. Although the project was never filmed, it gained Skaaren an agent, Mike Simpson, at the William Morris Agency, and attracted then-Paramount Pictures executive Dawn Steel's attention, who hired Skaaren to rewrite the screenplay of Fire with Fire (1986). He was later hired to rewrite Top Gun (1986) and credited as an associate producer, having compiled the last ten drafts. Among his revisions were changing Kelly McGillis's character from being a gymnast into a military instructor.

In 1986, Skaaren was hired to revise Larry Ferguson's script for Beverly Hills Cop II (1987). The Writers Guild of America West (WGAW) gave joint screenplay credit to both Ferguson and Skaaren, but Ferguson appealed to have sole credit. Posthumously, Skaaren's credit was retained when a California appeals court upheld the WGA's writing credits. Skaaren then co-wrote the script for Tim Burton's Beetlejuice (1988), sharing credit with Michael McDowell. In 1988, Skaaren did preliminary research for Days of Thunder (1990), but was approached to rewrite the script for Batman (1989). Due to the 1988 Writers Guild of America strike, Sam Hamm was not allowed to finish his script for Batman so Warner Bros. contacted Skaaren to rewrite the film's shooting script before filming was to begin. In a 1990 interview with Comics Scene magazine, he took credit for expanding the role of the Joker, removed the character Robin from the script, and inserted the now-criticized scene of Alfred letting Vicki Vale into the Batcave. At the time of his death, he had completed a script titled Beetlejuice in Love.

== Personal life ==
Skaaren was a native of Rochester, Minnesota. He graduated from Rice University in Houston, Texas in 1969. He served as the Student Association President from 1968 to 1969 and was a member of Hanszen College. He moved to Austin, Texas and began working at the Texas Department of Health and Human Services.

Skaaren married Helen Griffin on March 7, 1969. He and his wife fostered seven children, and he helped found the Travis County Foster Parents Association. He also served on the board of directors of the Deborah Hay Dance Company. In 1986, he established a private charitable trust, the Laurel Foundation, and was involved with the East West Center, a macrobiotic dietary provider.

Skaaren died of bone cancer on December 28, 1990. He was 44 years old.

== Legacy ==
Skaaren's archive resides at the Harry Ransom Center at the University of Texas at Austin.

In 2021, it was reported that Rochester Community and Technical College (of which Skaaren was an alumnus) had received a $75,000 gift from Skaaren's trust fund, which funded scholarships for students in need of financial aid.

== Filmography ==
- Fire with Fire (1986) with Bill Phillips, Paul Boorstin and Susan Boorstin
- Top Gun (1986) uncredited as writer but credited as associate producer
- Beverly Hills Cop II (1987) with Larry Ferguson
- Beetlejuice (1988) with Michael McDowell
- Batman (1989) with Sam Hamm
