= Body of Proof season 1 =

Body of Proof
- Season 1
- DVD cover for the first season of Body of Proof, showing main character Megan Hunt (Dana Delany).
- No. of episodes: 9

Release
- Original network: ABC
- Original release: March 29 – May 17, 2011

Season chronology
- Next → Season 2

The first season of Body of Proof, an American television series created by Christopher Murphey, commenced airing in the United States on March 29, 2011, concluded May 17, 2011, and consisted of 9 episodes. It follows the life and career of Dr. Megan Hunt, a medical examiner, once a neurosurgeon, who now works in Philadelphia's Medical Examiner's office after a car accident ended her neurosurgery career. Along with Hunt solving homicide cases are her colleagues, Nicholas Bishop as Peter Dunlop, Jeri Ryan as Dr. Kate Murphy, John Carroll Lynch and Sonja Sohn as Detectives Bud Morris and Samantha Baker and fellow medical examiners, Geoffrey Arend as Dr. Ethan Gross and Windell Middlebrooks as Dr. Curtis Brumfield. Mary Mouser plays Megan's daughter Lacey, Jeffrey Nordling plays her ex-husband Todd and Joanna Cassidy plays her mother Joan. All of whom she has a strained relationship with, one of the continuing stories throughout the season.

Body of Proof's first season aired in the United States (U.S.) on Tuesdays at 10:00 pm ET on ABC, a terrestrial television network. In the United Kingdom, the season premiered on July 19, 2011 at 9pm, and subsequently aired Tuesdays at 10 pm on Channel 5. It aired in Canada on Citytv and in Australia on Channel Seven. Body of Proof — The Complete First Season was released on DVD as a two-disc set on September 20, 2011 by Buena Vista Home Entertainment in Region 1, on November 5, 2012 in Region 2 and August 15, 2012 in Region 4.

Note that the episode list includes the names of the murderers (unlike normal Wikipedia episode lists).

== Cast and characters ==
Character	Portrayer	Appearances as main cast	Appearances as recurring cast
Megan Hunt	Dana Delany	entire season	—N/a
Peter Dunlop	Nicholas Bishop	entire season	—N/a
Kate Murphy	Jeri Ryan	entire season	—N/a
Detective Bud Morris	John Carroll Lynch	6 episodes	—N/a
Detective Samantha Baker	Sonja Sohn	8 episodes	—N/a
Ethan Gross	Geoffrey Arend	entire season	—N/a
Curtis Brumfield	Windell Middlebrooks	entire season	—N/a
Lacey Fleming	Mary Mouser	—N/a	5 episodes
Todd Fleming	Jeffrey Nordling	—N/a	3 episodes
Joan Hunt	Joanna Cassidy	—N/a	2 episodes
Bill Parkson	Eric Sheffer Stevens	—N/a	1 episode

== Episodes ==
No. overall	No. in season	Title	Directed by	Written by	Original release date	Prod. code	US viewers (millions)
1	1	"Pilot"	Nelson McCormick	Christopher Murphey	January 25, 2011 (Italy); March 29, 2011 (U.S.)	101	13.94
A female jogger is found floating in the Schuylkill River. Former neurosurgeon and newly-appointed medical examiner Dr. Megan Hunt teams up with her partner, medical investigator and former cop Peter Dunlop, under the watchful eye of their boss, Chief Medical Examiner Dr. Kate Murphy, who is very aware of Megan's gifted but polarizing work style. Megan's colleagues, Deputy Chief Medical Examiner Dr. Curtis Brumfield and Pathology Fellow Dr. Ethan Gross, find they have to tip-toe around the new medical examiner to get work done. Megan's investigation takes her into the field where she meets old-school Detective Bud Morris, who is exasperated by Megan's tenacity and bull-headedness. His partner, Detective Samantha Baker, has a quiet respect for Megan's input, even if Morris doesn't. Meanwhile, Megan has to solve a personal puzzle of her own - what is the perfect present for her estranged daughter's birthday.: Victim: Angela Swanson; Murderer: Jill Paige; First regular appearances: Dana Delany as Megan Hunt, Nicholas Bishop as Peter Dunlop, Jeri Ryan as Dr. Kate Murphy, John Carroll Lynch as Bud Morris, Sonja Sohn as Samantha Baker, Geoffrey Arend as Dr. Ethan Gross and Windell Middlebrooks as Dr. Curtis Brumfield. First recurring appearances: Mary Mouser as Lacey Fleming and Jeffrey Nordling as Todd Fleming.
2	2	"Letting Go"	Nelson McCormick	Christopher Murphey & Matthew Gross	February 1, 2011 (Italy); April 3, 2011 (U.S.)	102	8.49
When a young, interracial couple is found shot and killed inside their car in Fairmount Park, Dr. Hunt promises the grieving parents that their daughter's killer will be found. Detectives Morris and Baker are ready to chalk the case up to a murder-suicide, but Megan and her team find evidence on the bodies that sends the case in an entirely different and shocking direction. Meanwhile, Peter advises Megan not to push too hard when it comes to reconnecting with her daughter, Lacey.: Victims: Linda Chapman and Dave Piaseki; Murderer: Al Chapman; Recurring character: Mary Mouser as Lacey Fleming.
3	3	"Helping Hand"	John Terlesky	Corey Miller	February 8, 2011 (Italy); April 5, 2011 (U.S.)	107	11.15
During the autopsy of a young woman murdered in a seedy hotel room, Megan is shocked to discover her own special connection to the victim. Meanwhile, after learning of some personal challenges her colleagues are dealing with, Megan realizes how much goes on around her that she's been missing, and takes a sudden interest, much to her colleagues' amusement.: Victim : Elena Rosas; Murderer: Holly Bennett
4	4	"Talking Heads"	Christine Moore	Diane Ademu-John	February 15, 2011 (Italy); April 12, 2011 (U.S.)	106	11.06
When a severed hand and foot turn up in a back alley, Megan and her team must literally piece the case together. Meanwhile, Megan's daughter, Lacey, gets her mother's reluctant permission to visit her at the office and film her as part of a video essay for Social Studies class. What Lacey learns in the process profoundly changes her view of her mother.: Victim : Callum Shane O'Donnell; Murderer: Mike Walsh; Recurring character: Mary Mouser as Lacey Fleming. Note: John Carroll Lynch as Bud Morris did not appear in this episode.
5	5	"Dead Man Walking"	Matthew Gross	Christopher Murphey	February 22, 2011 (Italy); April 19, 2011 (U.S.)	110	11.37
Karen Archer is the identical twin of a beautiful corpse, Jessica, whose mysterious death keeps Ethan and Curtis guessing. As Ethan's personal interest in this case deepens, Curtis begins questioning Ethan's motives. Meanwhile, Megan faces old demons when she visits her former boss at the hospital where she used to practice. A patient has died after recent surgery. Was it murder or malpractice? Megan begins to suspect the victim's doctor, but when she starts ruffling feathers, the hospital stonewalls.: Victim: Ted Harbison; Murderer: Gwen Baldwin; Note: John Carroll Lynch as Bud Morris did not appear in this episode.
6	6	"Society Hill"	Kate Woods	Matthew V. Lewis	March 1, 2011 (Italy); April 26, 2011 (U.S.)	105	11.86
Megan re-enters the high society world to which she once belonged when a top magazine editor is found dead at her Chestnut Hill mansion. Megan accepts an invitation from her mother, Judge Joan Hunt, to a social event with the ulterior motive of confronting a prime suspect, appalling her mother in the process. When Kate asks Ethan to investigate the only trace evidence found at the murder scene, he's surprised by her uncharacteristically upbeat and supportive attitude.: Victim : Daphné Zimmer; Murderer: Lauren Matthews; First recurring appearance: Joanna Cassidy as Joan Hunt. Note: Sonja Sohn as Samantha Baker did not appear in this episode.
7	7	"All in the Family"	John Polson	Sam Humphrey	March 8, 2011 (Italy); May 3, 2011 (U.S.)	104	10.23
A perfect neighborhood in the Philadelphia suburbs is shaken when a stay-at-home dad is found stabbed to death in his home. As Megan unravels the mystery of his death and who killed him, she recalls how she learned of her own father's death. Meanwhile, Peter helps Megan juggle her biggest challenge yet, taking charge of the Saturday carpool with her hard-to-impress daughter, Lacey, and her girlfriends. Also, Kate takes on a consulting role in a pro bono case with Megan's ex-husband, Todd.: Victim : Ed Russell; Murderer: Tim Scanlon; Recurring characters: Mary Mouser as Lacey Fleming and Jeffrey Nordling as Todd Fleming.
8	8	"Buried Secrets"	David Platt	Christopher Murphey & Sunil Nayar	March 15, 2011 (Italy); May 10, 2011 (U.S.)	103	10.11
When a Philadelphia homicide detective is the victim of a hit-and-run, Megan must seek help with the case from her estranged mother, Judge Joan Hunt. All the while, Megan realizes she misses her own close relationship with her daughter.: Victims : Joe Salerno and Lizzy Adler; Murderers: Coach Hal Davis and Heather Clayton; Recurring characters: Joanna Cassidy as Joan Hunt.
9	9	"Broken Home"	Nelson McCormick	Andrew Dettman	March 22, 2011 (Italy); May 17, 2011 (U.S.)	108	10.33
Megan suspects foul play when a young socialite dies, even though she had a terminal illness. The investigation means the funeral is halted but it doesn't help that the body was embalmed before the autopsy leaving few clues for the team. The investigation is then interrupted by Kate's personal life. Lacey thinks her parents might be getting back together.: Victim : Nikki Parkson; Murderer: Sara Parkson; First recurring appearance: Eric Sheffer Stevens as Bill Parkson. Recurring characters: Mary Mouser as Lacey Fleming and Jeffrey Nordling as Todd Fleming. Note: John Carroll Lynch as Bud Morris did not appear in this episode.

== Ratings ==
No. in Series	No. in Season	Episode Title	Air Date	Timeslot (ET)	Rating/Share (18–49)	Viewers (m)	Viewership Rank Out of Top 25
1	1	"Pilot"	March 29, 2011	Tuesday 10:00pm	3.1/8	13.94	9
2	2	"Letting Go"	April 3, 2011	Sunday 10:00pm	2.0/5	8.49	—
3	3	"Helping Hand"	April 5, 2011	Tuesdays; 10:00pm	2.4/6	11.15	16
4	4	"Talking Heads"	April 12, 2011	Tuesdays; 10:00pm	2.5/6	11.06	11
5	5	"Dead Man Walking"	April 19, 2011	Tuesdays; 10:00pm	2.4/6	11.37	7
6	6	"Society Hill"	April 26, 2011	Tuesdays; 10:00pm	2.2/6	11.86	7
7	7	"All in the Family"	May 3, 2011	Tuesdays; 10:00pm	2.0/5	10.20	18
8	8	"Buried Secrets"	May 10, 2011	Tuesdays; 10:00pm	2.1/5	10.11	24
9	9	"Broken Home"	May 17, 2011	Tuesdays; 10:00pm	2.1/5	10.33	17

== DVD release ==
Body of Proof — The Complete First Season
Set details	Special features
9 episodes; 2-disc set; English (Dolby Digital 5.1 Surround); Audio commentaries; Spanish & French subtitles	Examining the Proof; If Looks Could Kill; Body of Goofs
Release dates
Region 1	Region 2
September 20, 2011	November 5, 2012
