= All in the Family (Body of Proof) =

- Body of Proof episode
- Curtis Brumfield (Windell Middlebrooks) (left) and Kate Murphy (Jeri Ryan) (right) were both praised in this episode, with their facial expressions, in this particular scene being called "hysterical".
- Episode no.: Season 1 Episode 7
- Directed by: John Polson
- Written by: Sam Humphrey
- Production code: 104
- Original air date: May 3, 2011

Guest appearances
- Jeffrey Nordling as Todd Fleming; Mary Mouser as Lacey Fleming; Molly Price as Jen Russell; Jake O'Connor as Mike Russell; David Shumbris as Ed Russell; Jay Klaitz as Neal Kendall; Timothy Devlin as Tim Scanlan; Lou Sumrall as Jake Benjamin; Teresa Celentano as Sarah; Anna Friedman as Betsy; Carlos Apostle as Manny Santos; Madeline Milne as Young Megan Hunt

Episode chronology
← Previous "Society Hill"	Next → "Buried Secrets"
- Body of Proof season 1

"All in the Family" is the seventh episode of the first season of the American medical drama Body of Proof. It was originally broadcast in the United States on ABC on 3 May 2011. The episode was directed by John Polson and written by Sam Humphrey.

In this episode, Megan Hunt (Dana Delany) and Peter Dunlop (Nicholas Bishop) investigate when a stay at home father is found by his wife Jen (Molly Price), stabbed to death at their house. With the help of Detectives Bud Morris (John Carroll Lynch) and Samantha Baker (Sonja Sohn) they investigate, with all the evidence pointing towards the victim's son, Mike (Jake O'Connor). Whilst the case is on-going, Megan receives flashbacks to her childhood. Meanwhile, Kate Murphy (Jeri Ryan) is asked by Megan's lawyer ex-husband Todd Fleming (Jeffrey Nordling) to help him with a case.

The episode received positive reviews, and was watched by 10.20 million viewers, according to Nielsen ratings, on the Tuesday night it aired in the United States. Critics called the episode both "disheartening" and "engaging" saying that "these characters and this episode was a winner for Body of Proof". They also praised the partnership between Kate and Curtis Brumfield (Windell Middlebrooks), calling the scenes "hysterical" and "funny".

== Plot ==
Megan Hunt (Dana Delany) and Peter Dunlop (Nicholas Bishop) arrive at the scene of Ed Russell (David Shumbris), a stay at home father, who is found by his wife Jen (Molly Price) stabbed to death at their house, whilst their baby daughter Sophie is at home. When Detective Bud Morris (John Carroll Lynch) goes to tell Ed's son Mike (Jake O'Connor) about his father's death, Megan stops him, telling Bud to let his mother tell him. Megan has a flashback to when she was younger, focussing on when a young Megan (Madeline Milne) receives the news of her father's death from a policeman, as the police did not know where her mother, Joan (Joanna Cassidy), was at the time. Jen admits that she cleaned up some footprints; she thought they were Mike's. The attack on Ed was personal and after Detective Samantha Baker (Sonja Sohn) concludes that the attack on Ed was personal after she finds evidence to suggest Mike did indeed kill his father, such as negative emails. Mike protests his innocence, and Ethan Gross (Geoffrey Arend) finds evidence which makes Mike innocent. Throughout the day, Megan tries to rebuild her relationship with Lacey (Mary Mouser), carpooling Lacey and her friends, Sarah (Teresa Celentano) and Betsy (Anna Friedman).

Megan's lawyer ex-husband Todd (Jeffrey Nordling) arrives at Megan's work, needing forensic testing for evidence that his client Manny Santos (Carlos Apostle), is a juvenile. Kate Murphy (Jeri Ryan) greets him, and she asks Curtis Brumfield (Windell Middlebrooks) to help examine him. Curtis finds evidence which suggests Manny has received recent trauma to ribs and other body parts, suggesting that he's being abused. Curtis explains to Todd that Manny is a juvenile, but he will not be able to be released back to his former home, as he is being abused there. Meanwhile, the evidence for the murderer fits a partial match to Mike, so Megan concludes that Ed is not Mike's father. She goes to visit Jen; however she slams the door in her face. Megan walks into her house and finds Mike's real father Tim (Timothy Devlin), holding Ed's and Jen's baby daughter hostage. Tim takes Jen into the garden when the police arrive, so Bud shoots him in the leg and arrests him and Jen is reunited with Sophie and Mike.

== Production ==
"All in the Family" was written by Sam Humphrey and directed by John Polson, most known for founding Tropfest, the world's largest short film festival, which first took place in Australia. Daniel Licht who has worked on the series since its inception, returned to compose the music for the episode. Actress Molly Price – best known for her role in Third Watch as Faith Yokas – guest starred in the episode as Jen Russell. Although Joanna Cassidy, who plays Megan's mother Joan Hunt, does not appear, she is mentioned in flashback scenes. These flashback scenes show a young Megan, played by child actress Madeline Milne. Recurring cast members Jeffrey Nordling and Mary Mouser returned in this episode, with this being Mouser's first appearance since season 1's fourth episode "Talking Heads" and Nordling's first appearance since seasons one's first episode, "Pilot".

"All in the Family", along with the eight episode's from Body of Proof's first season, were released on a two-disc DVD set in the United States on September 20, 2011. The sets included brief audio commentaries from various crew and cast members for several episode's, a preview of season 2 and a 10-minute "featurette" on the making of the show, with commentaries from the medical consultants who helped with the script, as well as a "Contaminated Evidence" blooper reel.

== Reception ==
=== Ratings ===
Body of Proof made me shiver. Beethoven's Fur Elise played on the mobile as baby Sophie lay only feet away while her father was viciously murdered. With only shadows and a few drops of blood "All in the Family" painted a brutal scene.

— Christine Orlando,
TV Fanatic

In its original American broadcast on 3 May 2011, "All in the Family" was seen by 10.20 million viewers, according to Nielsen ratings. Among viewers between ages 18 and 49, it received a 2.0 rating/9 share. This means that it was seen by 2 percent of all 18- to 49-year-olds, and 9 percent of all 18- to 49-year-olds watching television at the time of the broadcast. This episode achieved a much lower number of viewers than the previous episode, "Society Hill", but a higher number than subsequent episode "Buried Secrets". Body of Proof came fifth in the ratings on Tuesday night, it was outperformed by two episodes of CBS's NCIS and an episode of The Good Wife and NBC's The Voice. "All in the Family" was watched by 1.73 million viewers upon its airing on Channel 5 in the United Kingdom.

=== Critical response ===
This episode received positive reviews. Christine Orlando from TV Fanatic said she found the episode both "disheartening" and "engaging", as well as later adding that it was "sad" and "frightening" when Jake O'Connor was accused of murdering his father. Writing about the final scene which shows Megan enter the Russell's house, she said that she wanted to "smack" Megan for doing so, saying "What was she thinking? She knew Scanlon had committed the murder and that Jen was acting strangely when she wouldn't let her in. Yet, she went back to find the door open and walked right in. Megan's intelligent enough to know that something wasn't right but she's unarmed and untrained to handle the situation. For some reason she seemed incapable of making the smart decision to wait for the real police". Orlando said of the flashback scenes that she hopes in future episodes they "delve deeper" into Megan's father's death, saying that it was "certainly a turning point for the character and I'd love to know more". She said it was "nice" to see scenes between Peter and Megan and said of the carpooling storyline, "Snacks for carpool didn't seem like a bad idea but they could have used a couple of healthier options to go with the chocolate". Of Curtis and Kate's examining Manny Santos, she said that their expressions were "hysterical" and "funny" when they decided whether Manny was a juvenile, adding that it gave "a much needed moment of comic relief in an otherwise heavy episode". She finished in saying that the episode "grabbed her attention", finishing, "These engaging characters and this episode was a winner for Body of Proof". In the carpooling storyline it featured Tastykake's products, a line of snack foods based in Philadelphia. Such products which were mentioned were Krimpets and KandyKakes, with the ABC saying they were the "best".
