= Buried Secrets (Body of Proof) =

- Body of Proof episode
- Episode no.: Season 1 Episode 8
- Directed by: David Platt
- Written by: Christopher Murphey; Sunil Nayar
- Production code: 103
- Original air date: May 10, 2011

Guest appearances
- James Colby as Coach Lou Davis (Note: Although credited as "Coach Lou Davis" the ABC uses the name "Coach Hal Davis" as his name. Compare: Official credits to ABC's episode recap Archived June 18, 2012, at the Wayback Machine.); John Magaro as Chuck Foster; Kathryn Meisle as Helen Salerno (Note: Although credited as "Helen Salerno" Radio Times uses the name "Helen Salermo" as her name. Compare: Official credits to Radio Times's credits.); Thomas Schall as Professor Jack Elliott; Joanna Cassidy as Joan Hunt; Victor Cruz as Victor Ramos; Meg Chambers Steedle as Heather Clayton; Fátima Ptacek as Becky Salerno; Rebecca Blumhagen as Lizzy Adler (Note: Although credited as "Lizzy Adler" the ABC uses the name "Lizzie Adler" as her name. Compare: Official credits to ABC's episode recap Archived June 18, 2012, at the Wayback Machine.); Claire Natale as Ella Sherman; Derek Russo as Joe Salerno; Diane Guerrero as Sara Gonzales

Episode chronology
← Previous "All in the Family"	Next → "Broken Home"
- Body of Proof season 1

"Buried Secrets" is the eighth episode of the first season of the American medical drama Body of Proof. It was originally broadcast in the United States on ABC on May 10, 2011. The episode was directed by David Platt and written by Sunil Nayar and series creator Christopher Murphey.

In this episode, Megan Hunt (Dana Delany) investigates when Joe Salerno (Derek Russo), a friend of Samantha Baker (Sonja Sohn), is found dead, after being run over. However, Megan concludes that he was dead before the car hit him. Bud Morris (John Carroll Lynch) finds out that Joe was doing freelance work on a cold case involving Lizzy Adler (Rebecca Blumhagen), a student athlete who was murdered. After getting Lizzy's body exhumed, Megan realizes the same person killed Joe and Lizzy. Meanwhile, Megan asks her mother Joan (Joanna Cassidy) to help with the case.

The episode received positive reviews, and was watched by 10.11 million viewers, according to Nielsen ratings, on the Tuesday night it aired in the United States. Critic Christine Orlando of TV Fanatic praised the scenes between Samantha and Ethan Gross (Geoffrey Arend) calling them "sweet", as well as praising the scenes between Megan and Joan, adding that Joan was "a real piece of work" in this episode.

== Plot ==
Detective Joe Salerno (Derek Russo), a very dear friend of Samantha Baker (Sonja Sohn), is found dead, after being run over by Sara Gonzales (Diane Guerrero). When Megan Hunt (Dana Delany) arrives on scene, she concludes that he was dead before the car hit him, having been thrown off the bridge above the road. A distraught Samantha and Megan visit Joe's wife Helen (Kathryn Meisle) and their daughter Becky (Fátima Ptacek). Helen says that Joe had been distant before he died, after he was under review for assaulting Chuck Foster (John Magaro). Bud Morris (John Carroll Lynch) discovers Joe was doing freelance work on a cold case involving Lizzy Adler (Rebecca Blumhagen), a student athlete who was murdered, with Chuck being the prime suspect. Megan, Bud, Samantha and Peter Dunlop (Nicholas Bishop) talk to Lizzy's lacrosse coach, Hal Davis, who states that Joe had been visiting the team recently. Megan exhumes Lizzy's body, without her boss, Kate Murphy's (Jeri Ryan), permission. Megan gets her judge mother, Joan (Joanna Cassidy) to sign the request, who tells Megan that Lizzy is buried in the same graveyard as Megan's father David, who committed suicide when Megan was twelve. Megan and Peter later visit David's grave.

Megan receives backlash from Kate for not following procedure, but clay found in both Lizzy and Joe's pockets match. Samantha realizes that Joe found the crime scene of Lizzy's murder; the tennis courts at her school. Kate and Megan study her body and find a hand impression on her back, which matches one of her friends Heather Clayton (Meg Chambers Steedle). Heather killed Lizzy after she broke her finger during a lacrosse game. Lizzy's body was found elsewhere, meaning Heather had help moving the body, so Megan finds out that Lou helped Heather. Lou also admits killing Joe, as he was getting too close to the truth. After they arrest them, Megan revisits her mother Joan, asking to exhume her father's body. Joan declines the request, telling Megan to leave him be. Megan and Samantha revisit Helen and Becky, revealing that Joe had an undiagnosed brain disorder, causing the emotional distance from the two, telling them that Joe helped solve the Lizzy Adler case.

== Production ==
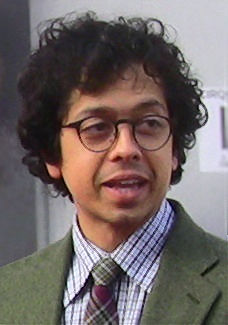
This episode focussed on Samantha Baker's (Sonja Sohn), reaction to the death of her friend, with the scene between her and Ethan Gross (Geoffrey Arend) (pictured) being praised by critics.

"Buried Secrets" was written by Sunil Nayar and series creator Christopher Murphey and directed by David Platt, most known for directing television series such as Law & Order and its spinoff Law & Order: Special Victims Unit. Platt has been nominated for three Emmy's whilst working on Law & Order. Daniel Licht who has worked on the series since its inception, returned to compose the music for the episode. Actor John Magaro – best known for his role in the film My Soul to Take – guest starred in the episode as Chuck Foster. Recurring cast member Joanna Cassidy returned in this episode, with this being Cassidy's first appearance since season 1's sixth episode "Society Hill", however she was mentioned in this episode's previous episode, "All in the Family". Radio Times listed Mary Mouser as appearing as Lacey Fleming, however she did not appear in this episode.

"Buried Secrets", along with the eight episode's from Body of Proof's first season, were released on a two-disc DVD set in the United States on September 20, 2011. The sets included brief audio commentaries from various crew and cast members for several episode's, a preview of season 2 and a 10-minute "featurette" on the making of the show, with commentaries from the medical consultants who helped with the script, as well as a "Contaminated Evidence" blooper reel.

== Reception ==
=== Ratings ===
In its original American broadcast on May 10, 2011, "Buried Secrets" was seen by 10.11 million viewers, according to Nielsen ratings. Among viewers between ages 18 and 49, it received a 2.1 rating/9 share. This means that it was seen by 2.1 percent of all 18- to 49-year-olds, and 9 percent of all 18- to 49-year-olds watching television at the time of the broadcast. This episode achieved a lower number of viewers than the previous episode, "All in the Family", as well as a lower amount than subsequent episode "Broken Home". Body of Proof came seventh in the ratings on Tuesday night, it was outperformed by CBS's NCIS, NCIS: Los Angeles, an episode of The Good Wife, two airings of ABC's Dancing with the Stars and NBC's The Voice. "Buried Secrets" was watched by 1.77 million viewers upon its airing on Channel 5 in the United Kingdom.

=== Critical response ===
This episode received positive reviews. Christine Orlando from TV Fanatic said of the episode: "Buried Secrets" left me wondering if there was even more to Megan's father's death than a simple suicide. There must be a story there and I hope we get to hear more of it. It would be nice to see Megan get her answers, no matter what they may be". Orlando called Joan "a real piece of work" saying that she could not understand why Joan would not allow Megan to exhume her father's body. She added that Joan was "cold" saying this adding, "I suddenly understood why Megan avoids Mom like the plague". Of the conversation between Samantha and Ethan Gross (Geoffrey Arend) she said, "Ethan's story about losing his guinea pig as a child was sad and sweet. In his own strange way he was trying to relate to Samantha and the death of her friend. Plus, it painted a heart-breaking picture of a sad, lonely boy". She added that the death of the episode "caused a ripple effect, touching everyone who came near it", including Kate, who she said that she admired Megan for exhuming the body, as "she's not allowed to flaunt [sic] the rules the way Megan is prone to do.
