= Society Hill (Body of Proof) =

- Body of Proof episode
- Episode no.: Season 1 Episode 6
- Directed by: Kate Woods
- Written by: Matthew V. Lewis
- Production code: 105
- Original air date: April 26, 2011

Guest appearances
- Nadia Dajani as Lauren Matthews; Neal Bledsoe as Stephen Burnett; Joanna Cassidy as Joan Hunt; Mam Smith as Daphne Zimmer; Dan Shaked as Timmy Akers; Lisa Yuen as Officer Spates; Christopher Durham as Brendan Cavanaugh; Phyllis Kay as Suzanne Pollato; Richard Donelly as Jim Pollato; Robert Walsh as Colin Lloyd

Episode chronology
← Previous "Dead Man Walking"	Next → "All in the Family"
- Body of Proof season 1

"Society Hill" is the sixth episode of the first season of the American medical drama Body of Proof. It was originally broadcast in the United States on ABC on April 26, 2011. The episode was directed by Kate Woods and written by Matthew V. Lewis.

In the episode, Megan (Dana Delany) investigates the murder of Daphne Zimmer (Mam Smith), who is found dead in her swimming pool, which leads her to a society party after an invite from her mother Joan Hunt (Joanna Cassidy); and Detective Bud Morris (John Carroll Lynch) returns, interrogating Daphne's employees, all who had several reasons to kill her.

The episode received mixed to positive reviews, and was watched by 11.80 million viewers, according to Nielsen ratings, on the Tuesday night it aired in the United States. Christine Orlando from TV Fanatic praised guest star Neal Bledsoe and regular cast member Windell Middlebrooks, who plays Curtis Brumfield. Orlando also praised the storyline, adding that it was an "interesting twist", one which she "didn't see coming".

== Plot ==
Magazine editor Daphne Zimmer (Mam Smith), who edits for the Society Fair magazine, is found dead in her swimming pool. Daphne is a friend of Megan's (Dana Delany) mother, Joan Hunt (Joanna Cassidy). At the crime scene, Megan finds evidence to suggest that there was a struggle near the pool, as well as bruising on the Daphne's stomach, which indicates that she died several days ago instead of that morning as was originally believed. At Daphne's workplace, Megan, Detective Bud Morris (John Carroll Lynch), and Peter Dunlop (Nicholas Bishop) tell the employees of Daphne's death. Bud questions Daphne’s employees, Stephen Burnett (Neal Bledsoe) and Lauren Matthews (Nadia Dajani), finding out that one of Daphne's enemies is Colin Lloyd (Robert Walsh), a wealthy man whose career Daphne ruined. Megan examines Daphne’s body, noticing that Daphne has kidney damage. Whilst Dr. Curtis Brumfield (Windell Middlebrooks) is working on maggots found on Daphne’s body, Dr. Ethan Gross (Geoffrey Arend) determines that hair, which was found at the crime scene, is human, and there are traces of arsenic and lead.

Megan decides that the only way to confront Colin is to accept her mother's invitation, which she had previously declined, as Colin is attending and after questioning him, she rules him out as a suspect. Curtis confirms that the maggots that he was testing take around two days to mature, so Curtis confirms that Daphne was dead for two days before the body was found. There are also traces of aspirin in them, so either Daphne was taking aspirin or it was being given to her without her knowledge. With the assistance of Dr. Kate Murphy (Jeri Ryan), Ethan determines that the hair is Victorian. Stephen admits to giving her aspirin, though did not realize she was getting sicker because of it, whilst Megan figures out that Daphne was electrocuted. After investigating, the police find out it was Lauren who killed Daphne, killing her after feeling angry about having to compete with interns for a journalism award. She threw Daphne in the pool in a rage when she confronted her, then throwing a space heater in the pool which electrocuted Daphne and killed her, not realizing she had dropped some of her ancestor's hair in the pool, which she kept in a locket. Stephen is released from holding after Lauren is arrested.

== Production ==
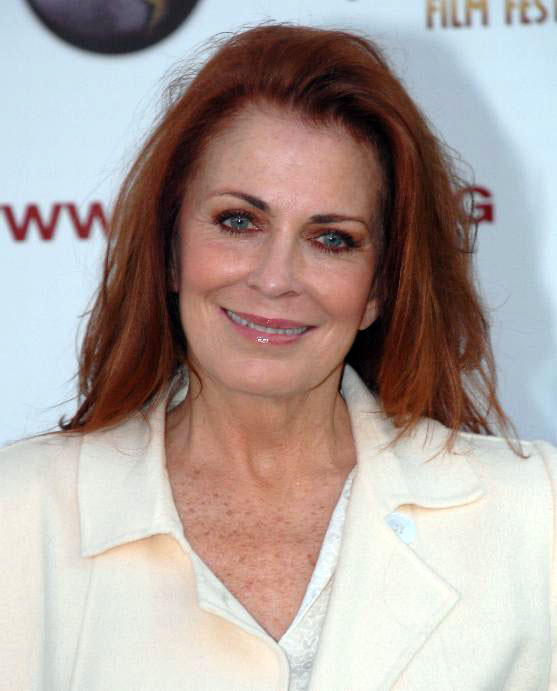
This episode marked the first appearance of Megan's mother Joan, (Joanna Cassidy)

"Society Hill" was written by Matthew V. Lewis and directed by Kate Woods, most known for directing Looking for Alibrandi and television series such as Phoenix and its spinoff Janus. Daniel Licht who has worked on the series since its inception, returned to compose the music for the episode. Actress Nadia Dajani (best known for her role in Ned and Stacey) guest starred in the episode as Lauren Matthews. Joanna Cassidy (best known for her role in Six Feet Under) made her first appearance as Joan Hunt, Megan's mother. Cassidy was reportedly originally meant to first appear in the third episode of the first season, "Helping Hand". Series creator Christopher Murphey said of Cassidy's role as Joan, "I get this weird chill when I write scenes for the two of them, it's a wonderful dynamic, I think Megan and her mother have a wonderful back story that we will be basically mining over the first few episode's. You're going to be finding out a lot about Megan". However, even though Cassidy is a recurring cast member, she is credited as being a guest star. Regular cast member Sonja Sohn who plays Detective Samantha Baker, did not appear in this episode and recurring cast members Jeffrey Nordling and Mary Mouser were credited but also did not appear. Some scenes were set in Chestnut Hill, Philadelphia, Pennsylvania, such as the murder.

"Society Hill", along with the eight episode's from Body of Proof's first season, were released on a two-disc DVD set in the United States on September 20, 2011. The sets included brief audio commentaries from various crew and cast members for several episode's, a preview of season 2 and a 10-minute "featurette" on the making of the show, with commentaries from the medical consultants who helped with the script, as well as a "Contaminated Evidence" blooper reel.

== Reception ==
=== Ratings ===
Joanna Cassidy is coming in as my mother, so you're see these three generations of strong women who don't really give each other an inch. I think you'll understand where Megan comes from once you meet her mother.

— Dana Delany,
Talking to TV Guide

In its original American broadcast on April 26, 2011, "Society Hill" was seen by 11.8 million viewers, according to Nielsen ratings. Among viewers between ages 18 and 49, it received a 2.2 rating/9 share; a share represents the percentage of households using a television at the time the program is airing. This episode achieved higher viewers than the previous episode, "Dead Man Walking", as well as a significant amount more than the subsequent episode "All in the Family". Body of Proof came seventh in the ratings on Tuesday night, it was outperformed by the ABC's Dancing with the Stars. "Society Hill" was watched by 1.69 million viewers upon its airing on Channel 5 in the United Kingdom.

=== Critical response ===
"Society Hill" received mixed reviews. Christine Orlando from TV Fanatic questioned whether in real life, medical examiners "do this much investigation on case", but then further saying, "I always assumed that detectives did the field work but if that were the case on Body of Proof then I suppose we wouldn't have much of a show". She praised Neal Bledsoe's portrayal of Stephen Burkett, saying that he did a "wonderful job of playing a chronic hair puller". She also praised the character of Curtis, stating that he was "adorable". Of the storyline she said, "The actual murder by electrocution was an interesting twist and one I didn't see coming. I was happy to see Bud jump in and read the murderer her rights before she said anything further. That certainly seemed like something a detective should do". She finished in saying that she "enjoyed" the song played at the end of the episode, 'Maybe' by Ingrid Michaelson "was both cheery and melancholy enough to fit the moment". Michelle Carlbert from TV Equals praised the scene in which Megan pulls Colin's hair, calling it one of her "favourite bits", another being when it showed Ethan, Peter, Curtis and Bud going out on a "Boy’s Night" stating it was "awesome" and that she "love(s) it when they show the team bonding like that". She also commented on Megan and Peter's clothes, stating that "Megan looked great in her dress" and Peter in a tux was "whoa".
