= Body of Proof season 2 =

Body of Proof
- Season 2
- Promotional poster for the second season of Body of Proof, showing main character Megan Hunt (Dana Delany).
- No. of episodes: 20

Release
- Original network: ABC
- Original release: September 20, 2011 – April 10, 2012

Season chronology
- ← Previous; Season 1 Next → Season 3

The second season of Body of Proof, an American television series created by Christopher Murphey, commenced airing in the United States on September 20, 2011, concluded April 10, 2012, and consisted of 20 episodes. It follows the life and career of Dr. Megan Hunt, a medical examiner, once a neurosurgeon, who now works in Philadelphia's Medical Examiner's office after a car accident ended her neurosurgery career. Along with Hunt solving homicide cases are her colleagues, Nicholas Bishop as Peter Dunlop, Jeri Ryan as Dr. Kate Murphy, John Carroll Lynch and Sonja Sohn as Detectives Bud Morris and Samantha Baker and fellow medical examiners, Geoffrey Arend as Dr. Ethan Gross and Windell Middlebrooks as Dr. Curtis Brumfield. Mary Mouser, who plays Megan's daughter Lacey, was promoted to "regular" from "recurring" status from season 1. Jeffrey Nordling, who plays Megan's ex-husband Todd, Joanna Cassidy, who plays her mother Joan, and Eric Sheffer Stevens, who plays Bill Parkson, all reprise their roles, whilst Cliff Curtis, Nathalie Kelley and Jamie Bamber join the show, all of which appear on a "recurring" basis.

== Cast and characters ==
Character	Portrayer	Appearances as main cast	Appearances as recurring cast
Dr. Megan Hunt	Dana Delany	20 episodes (entire season)	—N/a
Peter Dunlop	Nicholas Bishop	20 episodes (entire season)	—N/a
Dr. Kate Murphy	Jeri Ryan	20 episodes (entire season)	—N/a
Detective Bud Morris	John Carroll Lynch	20 episodes (entire season)	—N/a
Detective Samantha Baker	Sonja Sohn	17 episodes	—N/a
Dr. Ethan Gross	Geoffrey Arend	20 episodes (entire season)	—N/a
Dr. Curtis Brumfield	Windell Middlebrooks	20 episodes (entire season)	—N/a
Lacey Fleming	Mary Mouser	17 episodes	—N/a
Todd Fleming	Jeffrey Nordling	—N/a	5 episodes
Judge Joan Hunt	Joanna Cassidy	—N/a	6 episodes
Dani Alvarez	Nathalie Kelley	—N/a	10 episodes
Aiden Welles	Jamie Bamber	—N/a	3 episodes
Derek Ames	Cliff Curtis	—N/a	2 episodes
Bill Parkson	Eric Sheffer Stevens	—N/a	1 episode

== Episodes ==
No. overall	No. in season	Title	Directed by	Written by	Original release date	Prod. code	US viewers (millions)
10	1	"Love Thy Neighbor"	Christine Moore	Corey Miller	September 20, 2011	201	9.41
When a car careens out of control over an embankment, killing a middle-aged man in the driver's seat, Megan learns that all is not well on a pretty suburban cul-de-sac---where she and her team discover a neighbourhood swingers' club behind the picket fences and a possible toxicity in the soils among the homes. Megan also struggles between sustaining her improving relationship with Lacey and her boss Kate dating her ex-husband and seeming to interject herself into Lacey's life. Victims: Daniel Davidson; Murderers: Kevin Kaiser; First regular appearance: Mary Mouser as Lacey Fleming. Recurring character: Jeffrey Nordling as Todd Fleming.
11	2	"Hunting Party"	Paul Holahan	Christopher Murphey	September 27, 2011	202	9.19
When a wealthy tycoon's much younger new wife, Julie Loeb, is shot at a family deer-hunting outing, suspects abound. The tycoon, Martin Loeb, is such a likely suspect that Megan openly accuses him. At the request of the highly influential Martin, Kate fires Megan from the case. Martin's ex-wife, Alexandra Loeb, had a clear financial motive, but his grown children are also potential suspects. Megan and Kate's relationship grows chillier, but Megan's new case, that of a bludgeoned man killed in a bad neighborhood, brings her right back to the initial murder. Victims: Julie Loeb; Patrick Deline; Alan Wright; Note: Alan Wright was both a victim and a murderer. Murderers: Alan Wright; Martin Loeb
12	3	"Missing"	Eric Laneuville	Matthew V. Lewis	October 4, 2011	112	9.95
Megan investigates the death of a young nanny run down by a car and discovers that the dead woman's 6-year-old charge has been kidnapped and requires medication. A handsome FBI agent, Derek Ames, is assigned to the case. Meanwhile, Bud comes under scrutiny when the prime kidnap suspect dies during interrogation. Megan's mother offers to help her, but Megan is leery that it's just a publicity stunt for her judicial re-election campaign. The kidnapped boy's parents hide a disturbing secret that may expose the real kidnapper. Victims: Helen Martin; Jason Peterson; Noah Parker (found alive); Murderers/Kidnappers: Rena Talbot; Jason Peterson; Note: Jason Peterson was both a victim and murderer. First recurring appearance: Cliff Curtis as Derek Ames. Recurring character: Joanna Cassidy as Joan Hunt. Note: Mary Mouser as Lacey Fleming did not appear in this episode.
13	4	"Lazarus Man"	Stephen Cragg	Andrew Dettmann	October 11, 2011	203	9.00
A man who is presumed dead walks off Ethan's examination table, leading the team to a shocking discovery. Victims: Alex Grant (Alive); Paul Crawford; Murderers: Emily Burrows; First recurring appearance: Nathalie Kelley as Dani Alvarez.
14	5	"Point of Origin"	Nathan Hope	Bryan Oh	October 18, 2011	109	9.27
Peter stumbles upon a house fire and rescues a young woman. When Megan goes to the scene of the fire, she discovers that there is another victim who perished. This dismays Peter, who didn't know there was someone else in the house, and he now has a personal attachment to this case. As Megan begins her investigation, she is usurped by arson investigator Ray Easton and his colleague, Skip, who challenge her at every step. When Megan complains to Kate, she remarks that people usually find Megan impossible to work with, and the tension between the two heats up. Victims: Jenna Applebee; Ben Dupres; Murderers: Skip Rakoski; Final appearance: Eric Sheffer Stevens as Bill Parkson. Recurring character: Nathalie Kelley as Dani Alvarez. Note: Mary Mouser as Lacey Fleming did not appear in this episode.
15	6	"Second Chances"	Dwight Little	Sam Humphrey	October 25, 2011	111	9.43
A horse-riding champion is found dead in the woods, and her convict workmate Zoe Brant (guest star Crystal Bowersox) is a suspect in the ensuing murder case, as is the stable owner. Megan is starting to patch things up with Lacey. Lacey, also a rider, provides a valuable tip in the case. But Megan is about to find out the body is the proof, and they all have something to say. Victims: Bryn Walker; Murderers: James Savage; Recurring character: Jeffrey Nordling as Todd Fleming and Mary Mouser as Lacey Fleming.
16	7	"Hard Knocks"	Christine Moore	Sunil Nayar	November 1, 2011	113	9.90
A 17-year-old boy is found dead by the aftermath of an out-of-control party, and no one knows who made the 911 call. Megan's ex-husband, Todd, drops a bombshell, telling Kate, Megan and Lacey that he needs to move to California to teach at Berkeley. Lacey is faced with a difficult decision: stay with her mom, or move out west with her dad. Which one will she pick? Bud announces that his wife is pregnant. Megan and her FBI friend Derek finally get that date. Victims: Jake Brady; Murderers: Maxine Hall; Final appearance: Cliff Curtis as Derek Ames. Recurring character: Jeffrey Nordling as Todd Fleming and Mary Mouser as Lacey Fleming.
17	8	"Love Bites"	Christine Moore	Sam Humphery	November 15, 2011	204	9.76
When a pharmaceutical rep is murdered, with the body drained of blood, Megan and the team must find the original crime scene if they hope to find out the cause of death. The number of suspects with access to many unknown drugs poses a big hurdle. Victims: Amy Green; Murderers: Gaboon Viper Snake; Chris Quinn; Recurring characters: Jeffrey Nordling as Todd Fleming, Mary Mouser as Lacey Fleming, Nathalie Kelley as Dani Alvarez and Joanna Cassidy as Joan Hunt.
18	9	"Gross Anatomy"	Eric Laneuville	Diane Ademu-John	November 29, 2011	205	9.49
A murdered young woman's body turns up in place of a medical school cadaver during class, leaving Megan to rely on the eager star student to help solve the case. Victims: Jackie O'Shay; Murderers: Mitch Matthews; Shane Matthews; Recurring characters: Nathalie Kelley as Dani Alvarez and Joanna Cassidy as Joan Hunt.
19	10	"Your Number's Up"	John Putch	Matthew V. Lewis	December 6, 2011	206	7.23
Walter Brown, a recent multi-million dollar winner in the lottery, is found stabbed to death in his apartment with $50,000 floating out of his window. While most of Walter's friends, including his best friend, chalked up recent behavioral changes to his newfound wealth, Megan finds an endocrine tumor that could have caused the changes. In another case, Kimberly Gleason went into the hospital for an appendectomy and died of a serious bacterial infection. Ethan has trouble finding the cause until a second patient turns up dead. With Kate's help, Ethan learns how to run an investigation and deal with grieving family members. Meanwhile, Lacey uses Megan's credit card without permission to buy a hat. Megan returns it and makes Lacey earn her own money---in a way that gives Lacey new insights into the work her mother and the team do. Victims: Walter Brown (Accident Knife); Kimberly Gleason (Hospital Infection); Luisa Hernandez (Hospital Infection); Murderers: Hospital - Kim/Luisa; Walter Brown (Killed Himself by Accident); Recurring character: Nathalie Kelley as Dani Alvarez.
20	11	"Falling For You"	Christine Moore	Matthew Gross	January 3, 2012	208	7.05
After a bride plummets to her death on her wedding day, everyone from the angry ex-boyfriend to the overbearing father is a suspect. But just like a bride herself, Megan pays attention to every tiny detail until she can solve the crime---including the bride's willingness to let the wedding be stopped. Meanwhile, Ethan is falling hard for the new girl, Dani, not knowing that she's already found love with someone else on the team. Victims: Melissa Waxman; Murderers: Marc Freston; Recurring character: Nathalie Kelley as Dani Alvarez.
21	12	"Shades of Blue"	Kenneth Fink	Lawrence Kaplow	January 10, 2012	207	6.90
When an undercover cop operating against a drug ring is found executed at a truck stop and another cop is a suspect, the search for the killer hits close to home as Peter is torn between his new role and his old ties to the police force---the suspect cop is his former partner. Other police seem determined to stonewall the probe until an aspiring singer and a gruesome police prank lead Megan and the team to disturbing evidence. Victims: Johnny Vasquez (alias)/ real name: Eddie Castillo; Murderers: Detective Dave Lopez
22	13	"Sympathy for the Devil"	Christine Moore	Sunil Nayar	January 17, 2012	210	7.94
When a woman recently found innocent by Judge Joan Hunt of her child's murder is killed, Megan and her staff must find who did it. A sensationalistic reporter impedes their progress. Meanwhile, because of the controversy surrounding the case, Judge Hunt is voted out of office. Victims: Hillary Stone; Murderers: Ruth Stone; Recurring character: Joanna Cassidy as Joan Hunt.
23	14	"Cold Blooded"	Nelson McCormick	Allen MacDonald	February 14, 2012	209	6.26
When the owner of an Italian restaurant turns up dead in the freezer, Dr. Hunt and the team take a closer look into family matters. Meanwhile, Peter must face his own haunted past. Victims: Joe Sanella; Murderers: Caren Pedroni; Recurring character: Nathalie Kelley as Dani Alvarez. Note: Sonja Sohn as Samantha Baker and Mary Mouser as Lacey Fleming did not appear in this episode.
24	15	"Occupational Hazards"	Matthew Gross	Corey Miller	February 21, 2012	211	6.64
After a car accident reveals a body in the trunk, the team is led to another, leaving them with two cases to solve, while Megan is reconnected with an acquaintance and Kate's job is threatened. Victims: Kyle Harrison; Gabriella Diaz; Lisa Schmidt; Murderers: Harvey Brandt; First recurring appearance: Jamie Bamber as Aiden Wells. Recurring character: Joanna Cassidy as Joan Hunt.
25	16	"Home Invasion"	John Terlesky	Andrew Dettman	February 28, 2012	212	6.83
When the parents of a perfect family are murdered and discovered by their son, the team soon realizes that things are not as it seems. Meanwhile Curtis struggles with his new position, and Megan's new love life heats up. Victims: Michael Luxe; Robyn Luxe; Murderers: Travis Pope; Recurring characters: Jeffrey Nordling as Todd Fleming and Jamie Bamber as Aiden Wells.
26	17	"Identity"	Michael Grossman	Christopher Murphey	March 13, 2012	213	7.46
Two young girls are involved a tragic car crash. One dies and the other is in critical condition. As Megan and her team investigate the case, however, they realize there has been an awful mistake. Not only was the wrong girl pronounced dead, but the crash may not have been the actual cause of death. Lacey faces a new medical condition. Victims: Carrie Greyson - Dead; Donna Whirley - Coma; Murderers: Susie Foster; Recurring characters: Nathalie Kelley as Dani Alvarez, Joanna Cassidy as Joan Hunt, Jeffrey Nordling as Todd Fleming, Mary Mouser as Lacey Fleming and Jamie Bamber as Aiden Wells.
27	18	"Going Viral, Part 1"	Alex Zakrzewski	Matthew V. Lewis & Lawrence Kaplow	March 27, 2012	214	9.72
When scores of people start dying from similar symptoms, the team is faced with a city-wide outbreak of an unknown virus and no one is safe - including Megan and her team. Center for Disease Control (CDC) Officer Charlie Stafford (guest star Luke Perry) takes over the case to figure out not just what caused the outbreak but who. Victims: Dani Alvarez; Marcel Trevino; Cameron Reilly; Alberto Reina; Amy Thompson; John Kim; Brad Wilson; Viola Marks; Thomas Highchurch; D. Meyer; T. Alvarez; E. Jackson; Kate Murphy (survived); Murderers: John Mount; Recurring character: Nathalie Kelley as Dani Alvarez.
28	19	"Going Viral, Part 2"	Tom Verica	Diane Ademu-John	April 3, 2012	215	10.51
As the death toll continues to rise, the team needs to move quickly to figure out how to treat this virus and, more importantly, who is spreading it. Victims: Dani Alvarez; Marcel Trevino; Cameron Reilly; Alberto Reina; Amy Thompson; John Kim; Brad Wilson; Viola Marks; Thomas Highchurch; D. Meyer; T. Alvarez; E. Jackson; Kate Murphy (survived); Murderers: John Mount; Final appearance: Nathalie Kelley as Dani Alvarez.
29	20	"Mind Games"	David Solomon	Story by : Caren Rubenstone; Teleplay by : Allen Macdonald	April 10, 2012	216	10.05
A victim's cause of death resembles the first case that Megan had regarding a serial killer who took out the brains of his victims. In a case of twist and turns, the killer comes back to get revenge on Megan for taking three years away that he could have spent with his daughter. As the serial killer is about to murder Megan, Peter saves her but is stabbed himself. The episode ends with Megan cradling a mortally-wounded Peter. Victims: Jennifer Marshall; Niki Marshall; Evan Arnold; Peter Dunlop; Wilson Polley; Murderers: Wilson Polley; Note: Wilson Polley was both the murderer and a victim.

== Ratings ==
=== United States ===
Episode number Season Number	Title	Original airing	HH Rating	Share	Rating/share (18–49)	Total viewers (in millions)	Rank per week	Note
10; 2-01	Love Thy Neighbor	September 20, 2011	6.9	12	2.2	9.65	#34	
11; 2-02	Hunting Party	September 27, 2011	6.3	10	1.8	9.19	#36	
12; 2-03	Missing	October 4, 2011	6.8	11	2.0	9.95	#28	
13; 2-04	Lazarus Man	October 11, 2011	6.3	10	1.8	9.00	#33	
14; 2-05	Point of Origin	October 18, 2011	6.3	10	1.9	9.27	#35	
15; 2-06	Second Chances	October 25, 2011	6.5	11	1.8	9.43	#35	
16; 2-07	Hard Knocks	November 1, 2011	6.9	11	1.9	9.90	#30	
17; 2-08	Love Bites	November 15, 2011	6.7	11	2.0	9.76	#29	
18; 2-09	Gross Anatomy	November 29, 2011	6.2	10	1.8	9.49	#23	
19; 2-10	Your Number's Up	December 6, 2011	5.0	8	1.5	7.23	#36	
20; 2-11	Falling For You	January 3, 2012	4.7	8	1.5	7.05	#37	
21; 2-12	Shades of Blue	January 10, 2012	4.5	8	1.6	6.90	#41	
22; 2-13	Sympathy For the Devil	January 17, 2012	5.3	9	1.6	7.94	#30	
23; 2-14	Cold Blooded	February 14, 2012	4.1	7	1.2	6.26	#44	
24; 2-15	Occupational Hazards	February 21, 2012	4.4	7	1.5	6.64	#37	
25; 2-16	Home Invasion	February 28, 2012	4.6	7	1.4	6.83	#37	
26; 2-17	Identity	March 13, 2012	5.0	8	1.4	7.46	#24	
27; 2-18	Going Viral (Part 1)	March 27, 2012	6.6	11	2.0	9.79	#20	
28; 2-19	Going Viral (Part 2)	April 3, 2012	7.0	12	2.0	10.51	#17	
29; 2-20	Mind Games	April 10, 2012	6.5	11	1.9	10.05	#15	

=== United Kingdom ===
Episode number Season Number	Title	Air Date	Viewership (Alibi)	Rank (Alibi)	Viewership (Alibi+1)	Rank (Alibi+1)	Total Viewership
10; 2-01	Love Thy Neighbor	January 5, 2012	366,000	#1	85,000	#1	451,000
11; 2-02	Hunting Party	January 12, 2012	509,000	#1	89,000	#1	598,000
12; 2-03	Missing	January 19, 2012	445,000	#1	134,000	#1	579,000
13; 2-04	Lazarus Man	January 26, 2012	390,000	#2	107,000	#2	497,000
14; 2-05	Point of Origin	February 2, 2012	506,000	#1	124,000	#1	630,000
15; 2-06	Second Chances	February 9, 2012	437,000	#1	121,000	#1	558,000
16; 2-07	Hard Knocks	February 16, 2011	551,000	#1	140,000	#1	691,000
17; 2-08	Love Bites	February 23, 2012	491,000	#1	151,000	#1	642,000
18; 2-09	Gross Anatomy	March 1, 2011	484,000	#1	161,000	#1	645,000
19; 2-10	Your Number's Up	March 8, 2012	601,000	#1	134,000	#1	735,000
20; 2-11	Falling For You	March 15, 2012	452,000	#1	109,000	#2	561,000
21; 2-12	Shades of Blue	March 22, 2012	441,000	#1	103,000	#1	544,000
22; 2-13	Sympathy For the Devil	March 29, 2012	511,000	#1	98,000	#2	603,000
23; 2-14	Cold Blooded	April 5, 2012	454,000	#1	95,000	#2	549,000
24; 2-15	Occupational Hazards	April 12, 2012	557,000	#1	91,000	#2	648,000
25; 2-16	Home Invasion	April 19, 2012	437,000	#2	91,000	#3	534,000
26; 2-17	Identity	April 26, 2012	487,000	#1	100,000	#2	587,000
27; 2-18	Going Viral (Part 1)	May 3, 2012	492,000	#1	45,000	#6	537,000
28; 2-19	Going Viral (Part 2)	May 10, 2012	535,000	#1	79,000	#2	614,000
29; 2-20	Mind Games	May 17, 2012	544,000	#1	82,000	#2	626,000

== DVD release ==
When the DVD was released, Monsters and Critics said of the season, "The second season of Body of Proof takes what worked with the first season and continues to build on the premise. The series still feels formulaic to me, but the cast make it worth taking the time to watch and help it overcome any short comings. The second season sees more medical mysteries and twist with each episode as Dr. Megan Hunt (Dana Delany) and her team are back to handle everything from a child kidnapping to a murder where the entire city could be suspect. Along with murder and other crimes, the team deals with a new romance and Hunt continues to work around strained relationships with her ex-husband and boss. The series still feels formulaic and doesn't quite fire on all cylinders for me, but season two was an improvement. The series leaves you wanting to see what will happen in season three.

Body of Proof: The Complete Second Season
Set details	Special features
20 episodes; 4-disc set; English (Dolby Digital 5.1 Surround); Audio commentaries	Design of Body of Proof: Living Spaces; Bodies of Body of Proof; The Shark Week of Body of Proof; The Effects of Body of Proof: Playing with Fire; The Fashion of Body of Proof; Body of Goofs: Bloopers; Outbreak: Webisodes
Release Dates
Region 1	Region 2
September 18, 2012	March 4, 2013
