= A Stranger's Heart =

- Video cover for A Stranger's Heart
- Written by: Kelli Pryor
- Directed by: Andy Wolk
- Starring: Samantha Mathis; Peter Dobson; Thomas Kopache; Gina Hecht; Kevin Kilner; Mary Matilyn Mouser
- Theme music composer: Lawrence Shragge
- Country of origin: United States
- Original language: English

Production
- Running time: 90-100 minutes

Original release
- Network: Hallmark Channel
- Release: May 5, 2007

A Stranger's Heart (working title Brokenhearted) is a Hallmark Channel made-for-TV movie that premiered on May 5, 2007.

== Plot summary ==
Callie Morgan (Samantha Mathis), a workaholic magazine editor who prides herself on having no emotional attachments in her life, changes practically overnight when she undergoes a life-saving heart transplant operation. Not only does Callie find herself strangely drawn to a young girl who happens to be the heart donor's orphaned daughter, but she also finds unlikely romance with another patient who also recently received a new heart. She soon discovers that the man, named Jasper Cates (Peter Dobson), received the heart from her donor's husband.

== Cast ==
- Samantha Mathis as Callie Morgan
- Peter Dobson as Jasper Cates
- Mary Matilyn Mouser as Sarah 'Cricket' Cummings
- Gina Hecht as Darlene
- Kevin Kilner as Doc Jackson
- Raynor Scheine as Frank
- Amanda Carlin as Rose
- Thomas Kopache as Duds (Callie's father)
- June Squibb as Aunt Cass
- W. Morgan Sheppard as Fred Landreth (Cricket's grandfather)
- Garth McLean as Jasper's Brother-in-law
