= Baltimore Rising =

2017 film by Sonja Sohn

- Directed by: Sonja Sohn
- Music by: Dontae Winslow
- Country of origin: United States
- Original language: English

Production
- Producers: Sonja Sohn; Anthony Hemingway; Marc Levin; Sheila Nevins; George Pelecanos; Mark Taylor
- Cinematography: Cliff Charles
- Editor: Ashwin Gandbhir
- Running time: 93 minutes
- Production companies: HBO Documentary Films; Blowback Productions

Original release
- Network: HBO
- Release: November 20, 2017

Baltimore Rising is a 2017 documentary on the protests in Baltimore after the death of Freddie Gray. It was created, directed, and produced by actor and filmmaker Sonja Sohn and HBO Films. It covers the death of Freddie Gray, the protests and riots immediately following, efforts to keep the peace during the unsuccessful prosecutions of the six police officers involved, as well as efforts to change policing by both the Maryland General Assembly and the US Department of Justice. It includes segments covering the perspective of Black Lives Matter protesters, community leaders, and members of the Baltimore Police Department.

Among the protesters, it focuses on Kwame Rose (21) and Makayla Gilliam-Price (17), both young activists. Among community leaders, the documentary shows Adam Jackson and Dayvon Love, members of the group Leaders of a Beautiful Struggle. Among the police, Baltimore Rising includes Lt. Colonel Melvin Russell, head of a community affairs program in the BPD; Detective Dawnyell Taylor, the lead police investigator into the death of Gray; and interim police commissioner Kevin Davis, who came to his position shortly after Gray's death.

Baltimore Rising premiered on HBO on November 20, 2017.

== Reception ==
Melanie McFarland of Slate praised the documentary, writing it accurately communicated the "systemic and entrenched" problems on both sides: police who feel unsafe, retreat to their cars, and see everyone as potentially dangerous suspects, which furthers the alienation felt by the community and by the activists. She also felt that while it provided no neat conclusions or solutions, it accurately presented and summarized the many conflicting voices and opinions in the conflict. Hank Steuver of The Washington Post called Baltimore Rising simultaneously fascinating, scattered, and frustrating. He felt that this reflected the disorganized nature of the protests and the difficulties with channeling grievances into useful systemic change, however, so the frustration was authentic and accurate to the source material. David Zurawik of The Baltimore Sun thought Rising was excellent, especially its "brilliant" opening, but felt it was somewhat too lenient in its treatment of the Baltimore police's efforts, which he felt should have been examined more skeptically.
