= Loaded (2008 film) =

- DVD Cover
- Directed by: Alan Pao
- Written by: Kyle Kramer; Corey Large; S.A. Lucerne; Alan Pao
- Produced by: Corey Large; Jack Luu; Alan Pao; Ian Carrington; Aaron Rattner
- Starring: Jesse Metcalfe; Corey Large; Monica Keena; Nathalie Kelley; Chace Crawford; Johnny Messner; Jimmy Jean-Louis; Vinnie Jones; Mitchell Baker; Mary Christina Brown
- Cinematography: Roger Chingirian
- Edited by: Chris Levitus
- Music by: Ralph Rieckermann
- Distributed by: GoDigital Media Group
- Release date: March 25, 2008
- Running time: 98 minutes
- Country: United States
- Language: English

Loaded is a 2008 American crime thriller film starring Jesse Metcalfe, Corey Large, Monica Keena, Nathalie Kelley and Chace Crawford, directed by Alan Pao.

== Plot ==
Tristan Price is a wealthy and privileged teenager who seemingly has everything he could ever want, money, loving parents and a beautiful girlfriend. However, his perfect life is turned upside down by the arrival of Sebastian, a handsome, charismatic, ruthless drug dealer. As Tristan is sucked into a seedy underworld of drugs, sex and violence he begins to realise his new best friend is, in fact, his worst enemy.

== Cast ==
- Jesse Metcalfe as Tristan Price
- Corey Large as Sebastian
- Monica Keena as Brooke
- Nathalie Kelley as April
- Chace Crawford as Hayden Price
- Johnny Messner as Javon
- Jimmy Jean-Louis as Antonio
- Vinnie Jones as Mr. Black
- Mitchell Baker as Damon
- Mary Christina Brown as Lin
