= Kwame Rose =

American social activist (born 20th century)

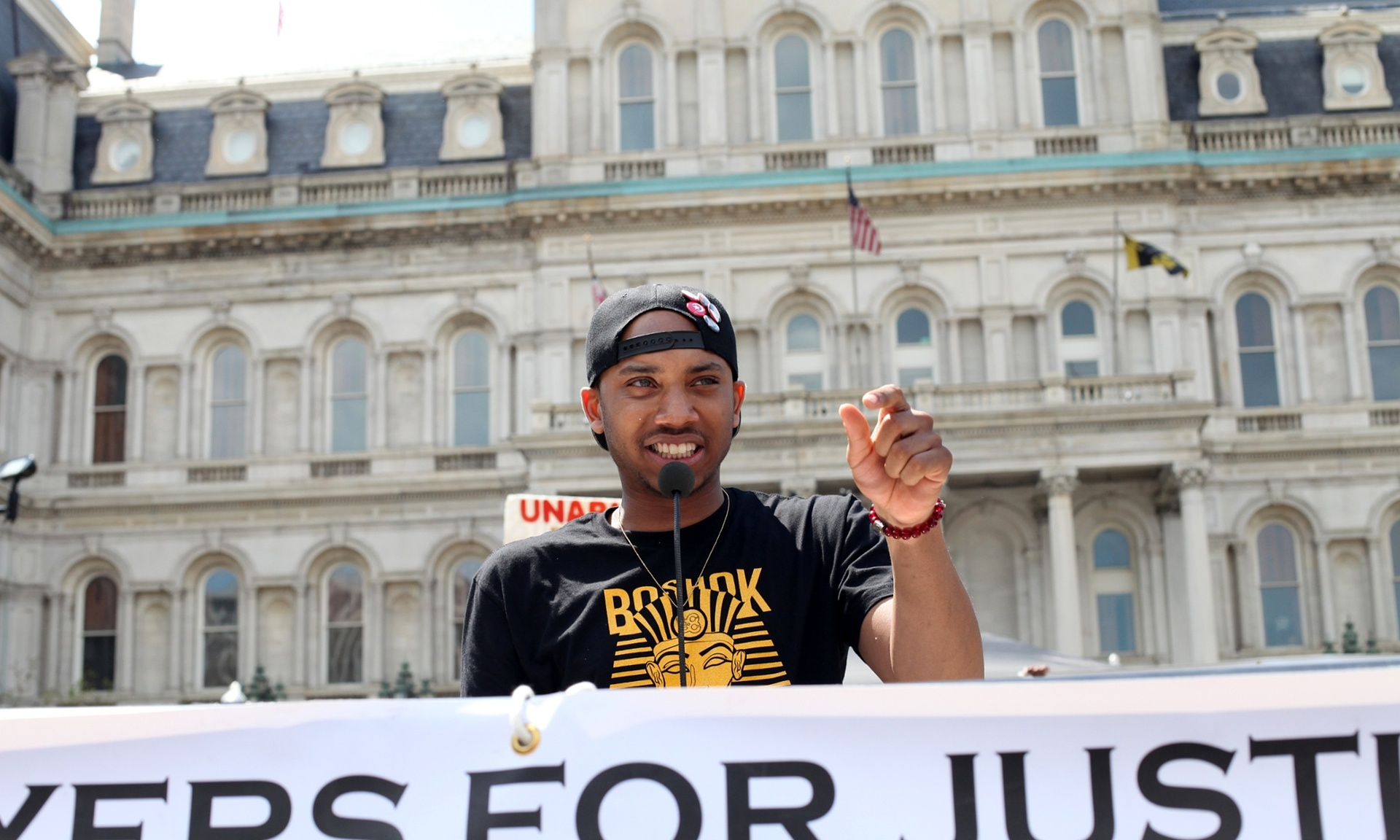
Rose speaking at Baltimore's City Hall on May 2, 2015

Kwame Rose is American social activist, artist, writer, musician, and public speaker.

Rose gained notoriety during the 2015 Baltimore protests in Maryland for his confrontation with Fox News reporter Geraldo Rivera, challenging the media's representation of protestors after Freddie Gray's death.

== Early life ==
Rose was born and raised in Baltimore. His passion for public speaking allegedly earned him a full scholarship to the University of Texas at San Antonio as a member of the debate team. As a student, he advocated for hip-hop–infused education as a means to educate the youth and give a voice to the voiceless. After the completion of his freshman year, deteriorating social conditions in Baltimore prompted his permanent return with a firm commitment to improve and serve his community.

== Activist career ==
In 2013, Rose helped form the organization Brothers In Action, Inc., a mentoring group for young Black males in Baltimore City. He served on its executive board until recently. He stepped down to launch BE Foundation.

In 2020, he joined the labor movement by working with the American Federation of State, County and Municipal Employees (AFSCME) Council 67, under the leadership of Glen Middleton.

== Freddie Gray protests ==
On April 29, 2015, Rose confronted Fox News reporter Geraldo Rivera during the protests for Freddie Gray, asking him to leave Baltimore due to what Rose called one-sided coverage of the protests and the city while ignoring Baltimore's poverty and social issues, how these issues affect citizens' lives, or the community's efforts to unite and clean up the city.

On September 2, Rose was arrested during protests at the courthouse. The arrest was videotaped. Some Black Lives Matter protesters insisted he was targeted for arrest.

Rose was a featured interviewee in the 2017 documentary film Baltimore Rising on the protests.
