= Adam Plack =

Australian didgeridoo player and composer

- Born: Adam S. Plack
- Origin: East Brighton, Australia
- Genres: New age, folk
- Occupations: Composer, musician, producer
- Instrument: Didgeridoo
- Years active: 1992–present
- Labels: Australian Music International, Rasā Music

Adam Plack is an Australian-born didgeridoo player, composer and producer, originally from East Brighton in Melbourne. He moved to New York City in 1991 and released four albums before moving into production and composition for meditation music in partnership with Deepak Chopra.

== Life and career ==
Plack comes from a family of classical musicians. He studied classical violin, piano, guitar and voice from a young age. He also enjoyed the improvisations on his father's jazz records and eventually turned toward the Australian landscape for inspiration. Plack picked up the didgeridoo in the early 1990s and began his recording career together with Johnny "White Ant" Soames, releasing the album Dawn Until Dusk (Tribal Song And Didgeridoo) in 1992. The duo produced a second album, Winds of Warning two years later. He has also collaborated with David Gulpilil and other Aboriginal musicians.

Plack has performed and recorded under the name "Nomad," releasing two albums. The first one, Nomad (1994), was nominated for an ARIA Award for Best World Music Album at the ARIA Music Awards of 1995. The single "With You" from the Songman (1999) album, reached Number 2 on the Billboard Dance charts and won the 2001 ASCAP Rhythm and Soul Music Award. Since then he has worked largely on meditation music with Deepak Chopra, including A Gift of Love (1998), which consists of translations of the poems of Rumi. In 2002, Plack released the Coco De Mer album, a project of new-age interpretations of classical arias.

Plack lives in Los Angeles where he works as a life-coach. He was once married to actress Sonja Sohn.

== Discography ==
=== Albums ===
Title	Details	Peak positions
Title	Details	AUS
Winds of Warning	Released: 1990; Label: Sunnyside Records (CrO1); Formats: Cassette	—
Didgeridoo (with Johnny White Ant)	Released: 1991; Label: Sunnyside Records (CrO2); Formats: Cassette	—
Dawn Until Dusk: Tribal Song and Didgeridoo (with Johnny White Ant, William Brady and Luke Cummins)	Released: 1992; Label: Australian Music International (AMI 3003-2); Formats: CD	—
Journey to Higher Ground (A Cinematic Journey in Sound) (with Chris Turner and Rachel Maloney)	Released: 1994; Label: Bunyip Productions (BPCD001); Formats: CD	—
Nomad (as Nomad)	Released: 1994; Label: Australian Music International (AMI 4004-2); Formats: CD, Cassette	—
Songman (as Nomad)	Released: 1994; Label: Australian Music International (AMI 7007-2); Formats: CD	—
Deepak Chopra - The Soul of Healing Meditations	Released: 2001; Label: Rasā Music (RSCD 3118); Formats: CD	—
Deepak Chopra - The Soul of Healing Affirmations	Released: 2008; Label: Rasā Music (RS 3184); Formats: CD	—

=== Film/television composer or contributor ===
- Undertow Didgeridoo for feature film score by Philip Glass (2004)
- Charlie's Angels "Belly" original song (2000)
- Perfume feature film score, directed by Michael Rymer (2001)
- Revolution TV film score, directed by Michael Rymer (2009)

== Awards and nominations ==
=== ARIA Music Awards ===
The ARIA Music Awards is an annual awards ceremony that recognises excellence, innovation, and achievement across all genres of Australian music. They commenced in 1987.

Year	Nominee / work	Award	Result	Ref.
1995	Nomad	Best World Music Album	Nominated	
