= Occasional Coarse Language =

- Directed by: Brad Hayward
- Written by: Brad Hayward
- Produced by: Brad Hayward and Trish Piper
- Starring: Sara Browne; Astrid Grant; Nicholas Bishop
- Production companies: Village Roadshow Pictures; Flickering Films
- Distributed by: Roadshow Distributors
- Release date: November 26, 1998
- Country: Australia
- Language: English
- Budget: A$40,000 (to rough cut)
- Box office: A$909,475 (Australia)

Occasional Coarse Language is a 1998 Australian romantic comedy film about a young woman who loses her boyfriend and job in the same day and tries to get her life back on track. The film's soundtrack features songs by several notable Australian bands including Spiderbait, Jebediah, The Living End and Grinspoon.

== Cast ==
- Sara Browne as Min Rogers
- Astrid Grant as Jaz
- Nicholas Bishop as David Radcliffe
- Michael Walker as Stanley
- Lisa Denmeade as Claire
- Michelle Fillery as Alex
- Belinda Hoare as Soph
- Shannon Faith as Monica
- Scott Hailstone as Michael
- Nadia Townsend as Beebie
- Louise Alston as Nurse
- Ugly Phil as Radio DJ
- Felicity Price as Bookshop Sales Assistant

== Production ==
Writer-director Brad Hayward was inspired by the success of the film The Brothers McMullen and made the original cut for $40,000. The film was subsequently picked up and distributed by Roadshow Entertainment, which paid for the post-production work.

== See also ==
- List of Australian films of 1998
