= John Polson =

Australian actor and director

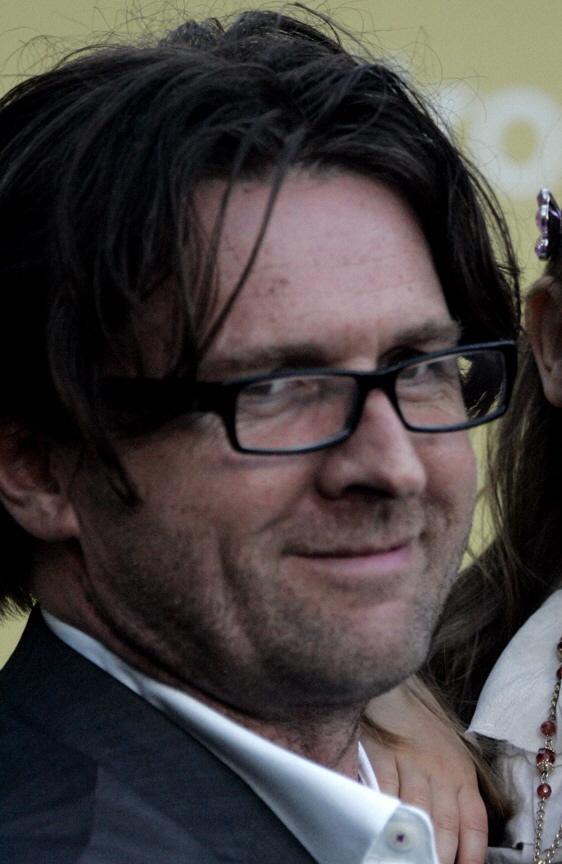
- Polson at the 2013 Tropfest in Sydney, Australia
- Born: Sydney, New South Wales, Australia
- Occupations: Actor, director
- Years active: 1986–present

John Polson is an Australian actor and film and television director. He founded the short film festival Tropfest in 1993.

== Career ==
As an actor, Polson is perhaps best known for his role starring opposite Russell Crowe and Jack Thompson in The Sum of Us (1994).

In 2005 he directed the film Hide and Seek, which achieved number one box-office status in America. He also directed the feature film Tenderness starring Russell Crowe and Laura Dern, which was released in 2009.

Polson is the founder of Tropfest, the world's largest short film festival, in 1993.

== Awards ==
In February 2001, Polson's film Siam Sunset won the Minami Toshiko Award at the 12th Yubari International Fantastic Film Festival in Hokkaidō, Japan.

At the APRA Music Awards of 2013 Screen Music Awards ceremony he was presented with the International Achievement Award.

== Filmography ==
=== As director ===
Year	Title	Notes
1999	Siam Sunset	
2002	Swimfan	
2005	Hide and Seek	
2006–2009	Without a Trace	7 episodes
2009–2011	The Mentalist	5 episodes
2009	Tenderness	
2009	Fringe	Episode: "The No-Brainer"
2009	The Good Wife	Episode: "Unorthodox"
2010	FlashForward	4 episodes
2010	Happy Town	Episode: "This Is Why We Stay"
2010	No Ordinary Family	Episode: "No Ordinary Mobster"
2011	Lie to Me	Episode: "Rebound"
2011	Body of Proof	Episode: "All in the Family"
2011–2013	Blue Bloods	6 episodes
2013–2019	Elementary	19 episodes
2015	Zoo	Episode: "Wild Things"
2017	The Walking Dead	Episode: "The King, the Widow, and Rick"
2018	Fear the Walking Dead	Episode: "What's Your Story?"
2019	The Code	Episode: "Maggie's Drawers"
2019–2022	Chicago Med	4 episodes
2020	The Wilds	3 episodes
2021	FBI	2 episodes
2021	FBI: Most Wanted	Episode: "Hustler"
2021	FBI: International	Episode: "Voice of The People"
2021–2022	Law & Order: Organized Crime	5 episodes
2025	The Last Anniversary	6 episodes
2026	Every Year After	Episode: "Goodbye..."

=== As actor ===
Year	Title	Role	Notes
1986	Shout! The Story of Johnny O'Keefe	Deejay Saxophone	2 episodes
1986	For Love Alone	Leo	
1986	Call Me Mr. Brown	Brian Day	
1987	Vietnam	Serge	10 episode
1987	Captain James Cook	George Forster	Episode: "#1.3"
1987	Dangerous Game	Tony	
1988	Rafferty's Rules	Garth Manso	Episode: "Peace of Mind"
1988	Always Afternoon	John	Television film
1988	Dadah Is Death	Kevin Barlow	Television film
1989	Tender Hooks	Tony	
1989	Candy Regentag	Cyril	
1990	Prisoners of the Sun	Private Jimmy Fenton	Originally released as Blood Oath
1990	The Flying Doctors	Michael Jordan	Episode: "Rest in Peace"
1991	G.P.	Brendan	Episode: "So Makes the Man"
1991	The Flying Doctors	Barry Maclntyre	Episode: "Open Day"
1992	Embassy	Vince Cooper	13 episodes
1993	Gino	Stan	
1993	A Country Practice	Robbie Angnew	4 episode
1994	Heartland	Patrick	
1994	Sirens	Tom	
1994	The Sum of Us	Greg	
1995	G.P.	Nick	Episode: "The Carrot the Stick"
1995	Back of Beyond	Nick	
1996	Idiot Box	Jonah	
1997	Big Sky	Jimbo's Competition	Episode: "Navstar"
1997	Kangaroo Palace	Richard Turner	Television film
1998	The Boys	Glenn Sprague	
2000	Mission: Impossible 2	Billy Baird	
2020	The Dry	Scott Whitlam	

=== Video games ===
Year	Title	Voice role	Notes
2003	Mission: Impossible – Operation Surma	Billy Baird	
