= Nathalie Kelley =

Peruvian-Australian actress

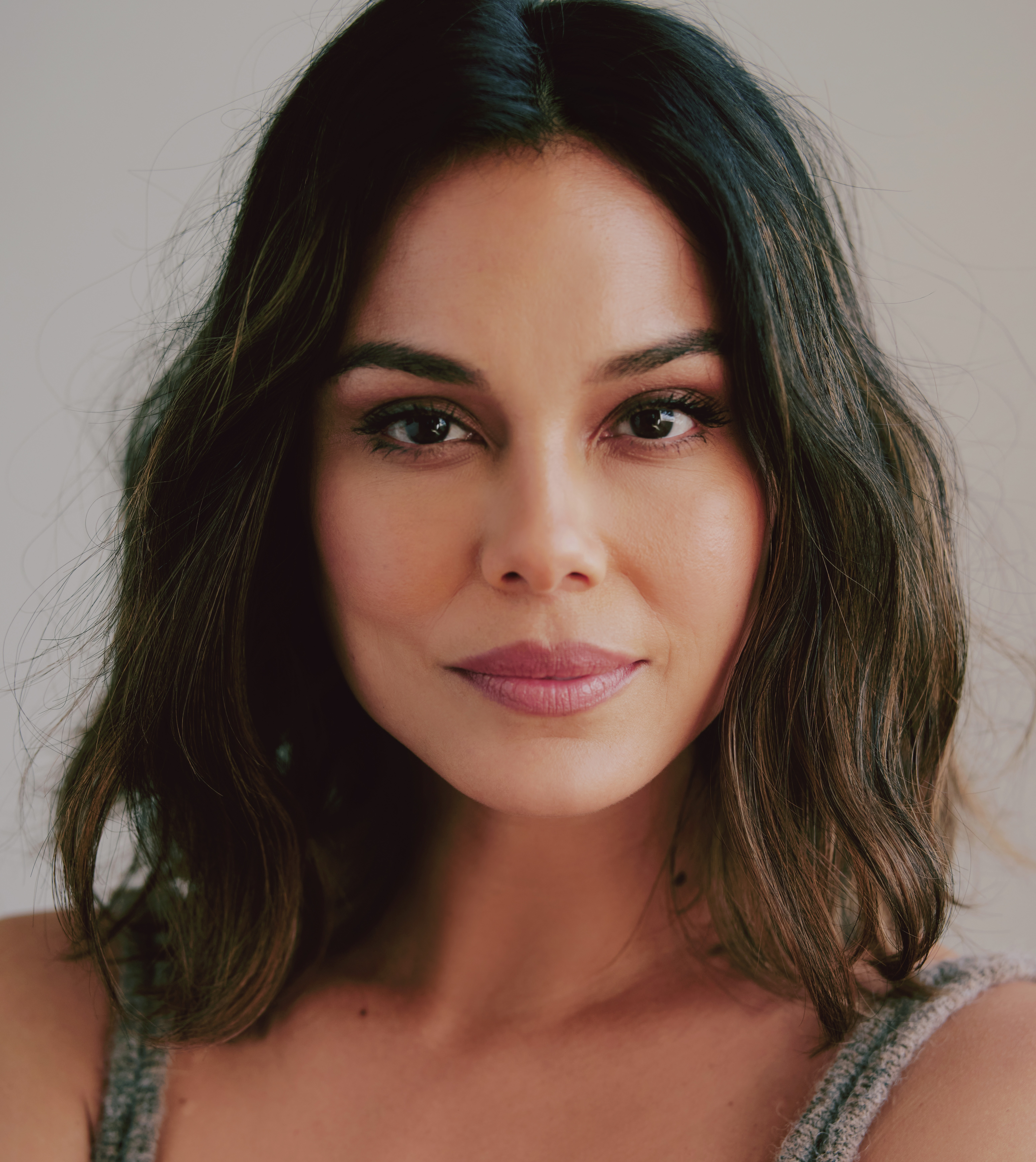
- Kelley in 2025
- Born: 5 October 1984 (age 42); Lima, Peru
- Occupation: Actress
- Years active: 2005–present
- Spouse: Jordy Burrows (m. 2018; sep. 2020)

Nathalie Kelley (born 5 October 1984) is an Australian actress, known for her role as Neela in the 2006 action film The Fast and the Furious: Tokyo Drift, and for her roles in various television series including Body of Proof (2011–2012), Unreal (2015), The Vampire Diaries (2016–2017), Dynasty (2017–2018) and The Baker and the Beauty (2020).

== Early life ==
Kelley was born 5 October 1984, in Lima, Peru, to a Peruvian mother and an Argentine father. They moved to Sydney when she was three. She attended North Sydney Girls High School.

== Career ==
In 2005, Charmed executive producers Brad Kern, Aaron Spelling and E. Duke Vincent developed a one-hour pilot for The WB titled Mermaid. Kelley was cast as the series protagonist Nikki, a mermaid who is rescued by a young man when she washes ashore in Miami. The pilot was not picked up as a result of The WB and UPN merging into The CW; the resulting network passed on the show.

In June 2006, Kelley received her breakout role as Neela in the film The Fast and the Furious: Tokyo Drift, the third installment of Fast & Furious franchise. In March 2008, Kelley appeared in the low-budget drama crime film Loaded alongside Jesse Metcalfe. In March 2011, Kelley had a small role in the retro comedy film Take Me Home Tonight, which starred Topher Grace, Anna Faris and fellow Australian Teresa Palmer. The film was shot in Los Angeles in 2007 but its release was delayed by Universal Pictures for unknown reasons. The following month, Kelley appeared as the protagonist in the low-budget horror film Urban Explorer, which follows a group of four urban explorers who explore an underground world beneath metropolitan Berlin.

In 2010, Kelley played the love interest in the music video for the Bruno Mars song "Just the Way You Are". In August 2011, Kelley signed on in a major recurring role in the second season of the ABC crime drama television series Body of Proof. Kelley appeared as Dani Alvarez in ten episodes and made her final appearance in the episode "Going Viral Part One". In 2012, Kelley played a vampire princess in the video clip "Luna Llena" from Puerto Rican reggaeton duo Baby Rasta & Gringo. In 2014, she won a regular role in the Lifetime series Unreal. In 2016, Kelley was cast as Carmen Castillo in the TV pilot sequel to the 1999 film Cruel Intentions, but the project did not go to series. From 2016 to 2017, Kelley appeared as Sybil in the final season of The CW television series The Vampire Diaries.

Kelley starred as Cristal in the first season of The CW's Dynasty reboot, from 2017 to 2018. In 2020, she debuted in the lead role of Noa Hamilton in the ABC series The Baker and the Beauty.

== Personal life ==
Kelley began dating Jordan "Jordy" Burrows in 2018. That April, she confirmed that they were engaged, and they married on 29 April 2018. They separated in 2020.

== Filmography ==
=== Film ===
Year	Title	Role	Notes	Ref(s)
2006	The Fast and the Furious: Tokyo Drift	Neela		
2008	Loaded	April		
2011	Take Me Home Tonight	Beth		
2011	Urban Explorer	Lucia	aka The Depraved	
2012	The Man Who Shook the Hand of Vicente Fernandez	Pretty Annie		
2014	Infiltrators	Gin Cross		
2014	With You	Aurelia	Short film	
2018	In Like Flynn	Zaca		

=== Television ===
Year	Title	Role	Notes	Ref(s)
2005	Mermaid	Nikki	Television pilot	
2010	Lone Star	Sofia	Episode: "Reverse"	
2011	CSI: Crime Scene Investigation	Monica Gimble/DJ Drang	Episode: "Hitting for the Cycle"	
2011–2012	Body of Proof	Dani Alvarez	Recurring role (season 2); 10 episodes	
2015	Unreal	Grace	Main role (season 1); 10 episodes	
2015	Urban Cowboy	Gaby	Fox pilot	
2016	Mistresses	Kristen Sorbonne	Episode: "Bridge Over Troubled Water"	
2016	Cruel Intentions	Carmen	Unaired NBC pilot	
2016–2017	The Vampire Diaries	Sybil	Recurring role; 11 episodes	
2017–2018	Dynasty	Cristal Carrington / Celia Machado	Main role (season 1); 22 episodes	
2020	The Baker and the Beauty	Noa Hamilton	Lead role	
2021	To Catch a Spy	Chloe Day	Hallmark movie	
2025	Motorheads	Samantha	Main role	

=== Music videos ===
Year	Artist	Song title	Role	Ref(s)
2010	Bruno Mars	"Just the Way You Are"	Love interest	
2012	Baby Rasta & Gringo	"Luna Llena"	Love Interest	
2018	Rhye	"Song for you"	Love Interest	
