= List of Body of Proof characters =

This is a list of the characters featured in the American medical drama Body of Proof created by Christopher Murphey starring Dana Delany.

== Regular characters ==
=== Megan Hunt ===
- Played by: Dana Delany
- Seasons 1–3

Megan Hunt is a brilliant neurosurgeon until a life-changing car accident prevents her from continuing to work in the operating room. Due to minor nerve damage sustained in the car accident, she can no longer use her hands to perform the fine manipulation which is required for the successful practice of surgery. The car crash exposes weaknesses in her family life as well, since her relations with her husband and child had taken a "backseat to her ambition", according to Time Magazine, and she has to work hard to get her personal life in order. Her relationship with her daughter, Lacey, is distant and difficult, but vastly improves through the seasons. Megan is a very eloquent woman, appearing to be highly independent and insensitive to some degree, but gradually, particularly throughout season 1, she manages to gain more sensitivity and dependence on her colleagues. Coincidentally, the real-life Delany had an experience similar to her character. Two weeks before filming the pilot episode, Delany's car was hit by a bus in Santa Monica; she broke two fingers of her hand, and her car was destroyed. Delany said in an interview that she loves to play "complicated characters" and her character in Body of Proof is "complicated, smart, and definitely complex."

=== Kate Murphy ===
- Played by: Jeri Ryan
- Seasons 1–3

Chief Medical Examiner, forensic anthropologist and Megan's superior. She is the first female Chief Medical Examiner in Philadelphia's history. She and Megan are often at odds in the workplace, and now in their personal lives, as Kate briefly dated Megan's ex-husband, Todd Fleming. In season three, she is encouraged to pursue public office by District Attorney Dan Russell. In the series finale, it is still unclear whether Kate will go into politics, though while reconstructing the face of a disfigured murder victim, she admits to Curtis that she really misses the nuts-and-bolts of forensics work.

=== Peter Dunlop ===
- Played by: Nicholas Bishop
- Seasons 1–2

Former police officer and now Medicolegal Investigator. After a gunshot ripped through his shoulder while he was notifying a family about murder, Peter found himself off the streets and inside a rehab facility. As partner and confidant to Dr. Megan Hunt, Peter now finds himself investigating Philadelphia's most mysterious medical cases alongside one of the most brilliant Medical Examiners in the country. Peter is stabbed in the episode "Mind Games" and dies in Megan's arms.

=== Bud Morris ===
- Played by: John Carroll Lynch
- Seasons 1–2

Homicide detective. A hardheaded, straight-shooting veteran of the Philadelphia Homicide Division. He fights for justice on the streets of Philly while fighting a personal battle at home: mending a crumbling relationship with his wife who just kicked him out of their Center City Brownstone. The couple began to reconcile after she announced she was pregnant. Bud clashes with Megan several times over their differing views at crime scenes. After seeing a grief counselor for support following Peter's death, he left the force to stay home and raise his newborn baby.

=== Samantha Baker ===
- Played by: Sonja Sohn
- Seasons 1–2

Homicide detective. Partner of Bud Morris, full of energy and very smart. Unlike Morris, she is more friendly towards Megan and respects her for her straightforwardness and work. After seeing a grief counselor for support following Peter's death, she leaves the Philadelphia Police Force to move to Virginia to join the FBI.

=== Ethan Gross ===
- Played by: Geoffrey Arend
- Seasons 1–3

Forensic Pathology Fellow. Ethan now finds himself as the youngest and most enthusiastic fellow working at the Medical Examiner's Office. Ethan partially assumes the position of Megan's Medicolegal Investigator following Peter's death.

=== Curtis Brumfield ===
- Played by: Windell Middlebrooks
- Season 1–3

Deputy Chief Medical Examiner. Curtis is a capable and intelligent Medical Examiner whose bluster belies his love for his job. Though he is Megan's superior, her full-speed-ahead attitude often allows Megan to convince Curtis to do her bidding.

=== Lacey Fleming ===
- Played by: Mary Mouser
- Recurring Season 1; main cast Season 2–3

Daughter of Megan and Todd, only grandchild of Joan Hunt. Lacey lives with her father Todd in the first season. In the second season, Megan and Todd share joint-custody of Lacey, so she moves back and forth between both homes. Late in the second season, she is diagnosed with type 1 diabetes. In season 3, she decides to stay with her mother when her father moves to California.

=== Tommy Sullivan ===
- Played by: Mark Valley
- Season 3

A former NYPD detective who left under mysterious circumstances, now working in the Philadelphia Homicide division. Tommy had a one-time romantic relationship with Megan that pre-dated the series. Megan alludes to their relationship being some 20 years ago.

=== Adam Lucas ===
- Played by: Elyes Gabel
- Season 3

A detective in the Philadelphia Homicide division and Tommy's new partner.

== Recurring characters ==
=== Todd Fleming ===
- Played by: Jeffrey Nordling
- Recurring Seasons 1–2

Todd is a lawyer, Megan's ex-husband and the father of Lacey. He briefly dated Kate.

=== Joan Hunt ===
- Played by: Joanna Cassidy
- Recurring Seasons 1–3

Joan Hunt is the overbearing mother of Megan and grandmother of Lacey Fleming. She was a judge, but lost re-election for her seat in season 2. Her husband and Megan's father was thought to have committed suicide when Megan was 13 years old, but it was later revealed that he was murdered and he was forced to make it look like a suicide. After the death of her husband was proved to be a murder, Joan's tough relationship with Megan finally changed for the better. Joan and Lacey get along fine; Lacey being Joan’s only grandchild. However, how well Joan gets along with Todd Fleming, her ex-son-in-law, is never shown.

=== Derek Ames ===
- Played by: Cliff Curtis
- Recurring Season 2

Derek Ames is an FBI agent who has worked with Megan on a couple of cases and is a potential love interest for her.

=== Dani Alvarez ===
- Played by: Nathalie Kelley
- Recurring Season 2

Dani is a driver who recovers bodies from crime/accident scenes and delivers them to the M.E.'s office. She is also a love interest of Peter, much to the chagrin of Ethan, who has a crush on her. She dies in episode 18 of season 2.

=== Aiden Welles ===
- Played by: Jamie Bamber
- Season 2

Aidan is a potential love interest for Megan in season 2.

=== Charlie Stafford ===
- Played by: Luke Perry
- Guest Season 2, Recurring Season 3

Dr. Charlie Stafford first appears in the Season 2 two-part episode "Going Viral", as a CDC officer acting as a liaison to the Philadelphia ME's office. In season 3, he has been promoted to Health Commissioner, and appears in several episodes.

=== Angela Martin ===
- Played by: Lorraine Toussaint
- Recurring Season 3

Angela Martin is the chief of the Philadelphia PD, making her first appearance in the Season 3 episode, "Doubting Tommy," and returning later in the season in the episodes, "Disappearing Act" and "Dark City." Chief Martin turned heel in the series finale, "Daddy Issues," as she revealed to Megan that she killed David Hunt (Megan's father) to cover up another murder she committed in 1977. Just as she was about to kill Megan, Chief Martin ended up shot to death by Trent Marsh.
