= Jeffrey Nordling =

American actor

- Born: Jeffrey Richard Nordling; March 11, 1962 (age 64); Ridgewood, New Jersey, U.S.
- Education: Ramsey High School
- Alma mater: Wheaton College (BA); Southern Methodist University (MFA)
- Occupation: Actor
- Years active: 1988–present
- Notable work: Once and Again; 24; Desperate Housewives; Big Little Lies
- Spouse: Francia T. Dimase (div.)
- Children: 3

Jeffrey Richard Nordling (born March 11, 1962) is an American actor. He is known for his roles as Jake Manning in Once and Again, Larry Moss in 24, Nick Bolen in Desperate Housewives, and Gordon Klein in Big Little Lies, as well as Coach Orion in D3: The Mighty Ducks.

== Early life and education ==
Nordling was born March 11, 1962, in Ridgewood, New Jersey, to Robert George Nordling and Lois Nordling (née Dickson). He grew up in Washington Township. After moving to Saddle River, New Jersey, Nordling attended Ramsey High School, graduating in 1980. After high school, Nordling attended Wheaton College in Wheaton, Illinois. He graduated with a bachelor's degree in art in 1984. He received a Master of Fine Arts degree in 1987 from the Meadows School of the Arts at Southern Methodist University (SMU) in Dallas, Texas. Nordling is a Swedish surname.

== Career ==
One of his major roles was playing Ted Orion, an NHL pro turned hockey coach in D3: The Mighty Ducks. The 1997 TV movie Soul Mates, starring Nordling and Kim Raver, is shown by market researchers at Television Preview as a "new" pilot. He played Gaëtan Dugas in And the Band Played On, the HBO adaptation of Randy Shilts's book of the same name on the early years of the AIDS epidemic, and Capote Duncan in Sex and the City. In 1999 he portrayed original Apple investor Mike Markkula in the TNT movie Pirates of Silicon Valley.

He played Sela Ward's ex-husband, Jake Manning, on the TV drama Once and Again from 1999 to 2002. He starred as Brent Barrow alongside Courteney Cox in the series Dirt on the FX cable network in 2007–08. He has also appeared as FBI agent Larry Moss in the seventh season of 24.

During the 2009–10 season of Desperate Housewives, Nordling played Nick Bolen, a regular and the on-screen husband of Drea de Matteo, but the roles of the Bolens were discontinued after the one season.

Nordling starred as 9/11 hero Tom Burnett in Flight 93. In 2011, he began a recurring role on the medical/crime drama Body of Proof, playing Todd Fleming, the former husband of Dana Delany's character, which he played until the show's cancellation.

== Filmography ==
=== Film ===
Year	Title	Role	Notes
1988	Working Girl	Tim Rourke	
1992	Ruby	Hank	
1994	Holy Matrimony	Link	
1994	Quiz Show	John Van Doren	
1994	Love Affair	Lou	
1996	D3: The Mighty Ducks	Coach Ted Orion	
1998	Polish Wedding	Father Don	
1999	Turbulence 2: Fear of Flying	Elliot	
2006	Flicka	Rick Koop	
2006	Home of the Brave	Cary	
2008	Hole in the Paper Sky	Prof. Cory	Short
2008	Surfer, Dude	Eddie Zarno	
2009	Love Hurts	Curtis	
2010	Tron: Legacy	Richard Mackey	
2014	Beautiful Girl	J.B.	
2016	Sully	Barry Leonard	
2023	The Locksmith	Ian Zwick	
2025	Bird In Hand	Dale	

=== Television ===
Year	Title	Role	Notes
1988	Beauty and the Beast	Tyler	Episode: "The Alchemist"
1988	Shooter	Matt Thompson / Grunwald	Unsold TV pilot
1989	American Playhouse	Roy Howard	Episode: "Ask Me Again"
1989	Alien Nation	Ted Healy	Episode: "Chains of Love"
1990	The Outsiders	Dean Viola	Episode: "Maybe Baby"
1991	The Young Riders	Frank Pike	Episode: "The Exchange"
1991	Brooklyn Bridge	Gil Hodges	2 episodes
1991	Mission of the Shark: The Saga of the U.S.S. Indianapolis	Tasker	Television film
1992	Black Death	Dr. Jake Prescott	Television film
1992	Citizen Cohn	G. David Schine	Television film
1993	Star Trek: Deep Space Nine	Tahna Los	Episode: "Past Prologue"
1993	Journey to the Center of the Earth	Chris Turner	Television film
1993	Time Trax	Carl Manheim	Episode: "Face of Death"
1993	And the Band Played On	Gaëtan Dugas	Television film
1993	Murder, She Wrote	Bruce Hastings	Episode: "Dead to Rights"
1994	Murder, She Wrote	Richard Hawkes	Episode: "To Kill a Legend"
1994	Dangerous Heart	Lee	Television film
1994	Baby Brokers	John	Television film
1994	Someone She Knows	Greg Philips	Television film
1995	The Shamrock Conspiracy	Frank	Television film
1995	A Stranger in Town	Larry	Television film
1995	Chicago Hope	Mr. Schepps	Episode: "Songs from the Cuckoo Birds"
1995	Trail of Tears	Michael	Television film
1995	Touched by an Angel	Jackson Spears	Episode: "The Big Bang"
1996	Harrison: Cry of the City	Frank	Television film
1996	Roseanne	Joe Matthews	Episode: "Morning Becomes Obnoxious"
1996	Remembrance	Col. Brad Fullerton	Television film
1996	Apollo 11	Neil Armstrong	Television film
1997	Soul Mates	Dennis	Television film
1997	The Sleepwalker Killing	Det. Lloyd Boyko	Television film
1997	True Women	Dr. Peter Woods	Television film
1997	Veronica's Closet	Tom	Episode: "Veronica's First Date"
1997	Melrose Place	Eric Baines	Recurring role
1997	Almost Perfect	Jack Chenault	2 episodes
1998	Sex and the City	Capote Duncan	Episode: "Sex and the City"
1998	Arliss	Joe Lansing	Episode: "Behind Every Great Client..."
1998	Saint Maybe	Danny Bedloe	Television film
1999	Blue Moon	Billy Medieros	Television film
1999	Pirates of Silicon Valley	Mike Markkula	Television film
1999	Chicken Soup for the Soul	Tom	Episode: "A Salesman's First Sale"
1999–2002	Once and Again	Jake Manning	Main role
2000	Personally Yours	Jesse Stanton	Television film
2001	Just Ask My Children	Scott Kniffen	Television film
2002	State of Grace	Dell Adams	Episode: "Take Good Care of My Baby"
2002	Providence	Dr. David Baylor	Recurring role
2003	The Flannerys	Barrett Flannery	Television film
2003	War Stories	Ian Rhys	Television film
2003	The Lone Ranger	James Landry	Television film
2003	Still Standing	Matt Russell	Episode: "Still Sisters"
2003	Crossing Jordan	Tom Crane	"Episode: Cruel & Unusual"
2003	The Lyon's Den	Special Agent Colton Mead	Episode: "The Fifth"
2004	Beverly Hills S.U.V.	Jeff Aronson	Television film
2004	Cold Case	Roy Minard	Episode: "Hubris"
2004	Nip/Tuck	Roger	Episode: "Kimber Henry"
2004	Searching for David's Heart	Bill Deeton	Television film
2005	Life As We Know It	Mike	2 episodes
2005	Listen Up	Dr. Swerling	Episode: "Colon-oopscopy"
2005	Judging Amy	Prof. Kurt Tomko	Episode: "Too Little, Too Late"
2005	All Grown Up!	Big Red / Crazy Australian (voice)	Episode: "Dude, Where's My Horse?: Parts 1 & 2"
2005	The Closer	Hart Phillips	Episode: "Good Housekeeping"
2005	Killer Instinct	The Professor	Episode: "Pilot"
2005	CSI: Crime Scene Investigation	Mark Thayer	Episode: "Secrets & Flies"
2005	Bones	David Ross	Episode: "The Man on Death Row"
2005	Close to Home	Coach Matt Whiting	Episode: "Baseball Murder"
2006	Flight 93	Tom Burnett	Television film
2006	Justice	OC DA Richard Lane	Episode: "Behind the Orange Curtain"
2007	Shark	FBI Special Agent Oliver Hayes	Episode: "Student Body"
2007–2008	Dirt	Brent Barrow	Recurring role
2008	The Mentalist	Price Randolph	Episode: "Pilot"
2009	24	Larry Moss	Regular role
2009	Mrs. Washington Goes to Smith	Prof. Terry O'Neill	Television film
2009–2010	Desperate Housewives	Nick Bolen	Recurring role
2010	The Quickening	Gabe	Television film
2011	Normal	Mark Maddux	Television film
2011	In Plain Sight	Kurt Gaffney	Episode: "Kumar vs Kumar"
2011	The Protector	Lt. Jack Brennan	2 episodes
2011	CSI: NY	Sen. Kirk Matthews	2 episodes
2011–2012	Body of Proof	Todd Fleming	Recurring role
2012	This American Housewife	Stanford Swift	Episode: "Pilot"
2012	Happily Divorced	Matthew	Episode: "Peter Comes Out, Again"
2012	Malibu Country	Bobby	2 episodes
2012–2014	Arrow	Frank Bertinelli	3 episodes
2013	Necessary Roughness	Glenn Purlman	Episode: "There's the Door"
2014	Sea of Fire	Rev. Bobby McAllister	Television film
2014	Cloud 9	Sebastian Swift	Television film
2014	Killer Women	Sen. Jake Colton	Guest role
2014	Rake	Bruce Mangan	Main role
2014	Castle	Marcus Lark	Episode: "The Time of Our Lives"
2014	Criminal Minds	Jack Westbrook	Episode: "The Boys of Sudworth Place"
2015	Cain Enabled	S.G.	2 episodes
2015	Hawaii Five-0	Josh Bennett	Episode: "A Make Kaua"
2015	Motive	Deputy Chief Earl Halford	2 episodes
2017–2018	Nashville	Brad Maitland	19 episodes
2017	Big Little Lies	Gordon Klein	14 episodes
2017	I'm Dying Up Here	Eli Gershmann	7 episodes
2017	Salvation	Daniel	3 episodes
2017, 2019	The Gifted	Daniel Reynolds	2 episodes
2018	The Man in the High Castle	Dr. Daniel Ryan	5 episodes
2018–2019	Suits	Eric Kaldor	4 episodes
2019	Proven Innocent	Rick Zahn	5 episodes
2019	The Summer People	Robert	Television film
2020	High Fidelity	Tim Parker	Episode: "Uptown"
2020	Better Things	Donny	Episode: "She's Fifty"
2021	Walker	Stan Morrison	4 episodes
2022	This Is Us	Eric	Episode: "One Giant Leap"
2022	Law & Order	Jordan Reed	Episode: "Free Speech"
2022	Five Days at Memorial	Richard T. Simmons Jr.	3 episodes
2022–2024	So Help Me Todd	Gus Easton	Recurring role
2024	American Sports Story	Huntley Johnson	2 episodes

=== Video games ===
Year	Title	Role
2016	Call of Duty: Infinite Warfare	Ethan
2026	Marvel's Wolverine	Walter Langkowski / Sasquatch
