= Mary Mouser =

American actress (born 1996)

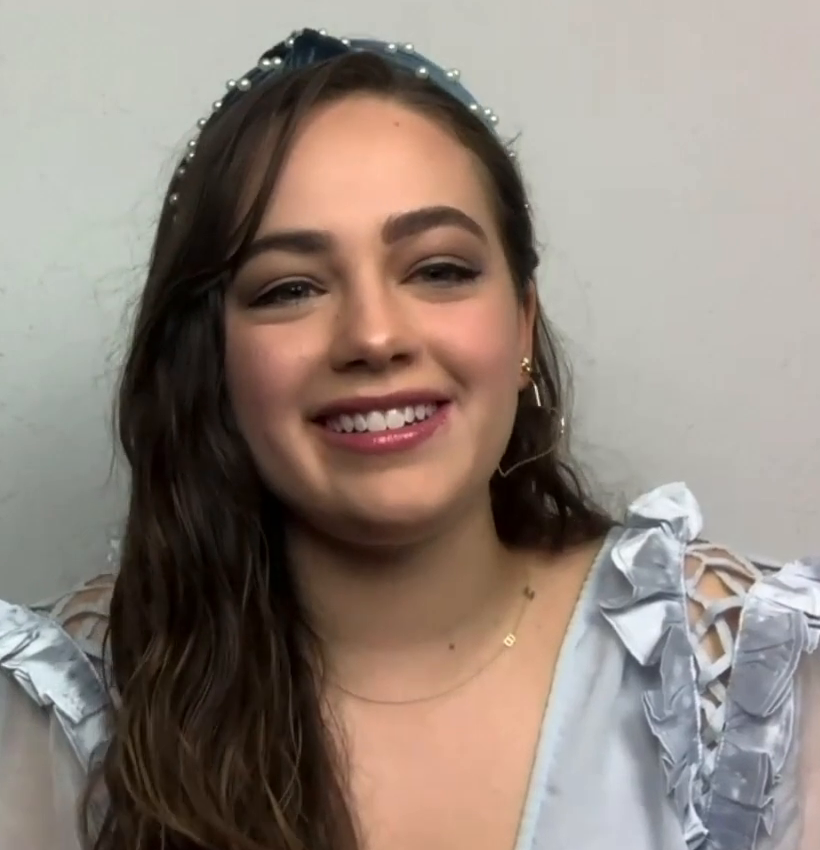
- Mouser in 2021
- Born: Mary Matilyn Mouser; May 9, 1996 (age 30)
- Occupations: Actress, influencer
- Years active: 2004–present
- Partner: Tanner Buchanan 2025-present (engaged)

Mary Matilyn Mouser (born May 9, 1996) is an American actress who is best known for her portrayal of Samantha "Sam" LaRusso, the daughter of the original Karate Kid Daniel LaRusso, in the Netflix series Cobra Kai. She was also the voice of Eloise in Eloise: The Animated Series and Lacey Fleming on the ABC series Body of Proof. Mouser took over the role of Karen Grant, Fitz & Mellie's daughter on Scandal in Season 4. She is also known as an influencer on TikTok and YouTube.

== Early life and career ==
Mouser was born on May 9, 1996. She was raised in Pine Bluff, Arkansas. She was featured on the Starz Kids & Family series Eloise: The Animated Series as the voice of Eloise and appeared as the child-lead in the Hallmark Channel original movie A Stranger's Heart. Mouser has also done voice work for animated features such as Dragon Hunters, Tarzan II, and Pom Poko, and was a voice actress in the audio drama series, Adventures in Odyssey as Samantha McKay, younger sister of Grady McKay.

Mouser has also appeared in guest starring roles on CSI: Crime Scene Investigation, Without a Trace, The King of Queens, Monk, Inconceivable, Scrubs, One Life to Live and had a recurring role on NCIS as Leroy Jethro Gibbs' daughter Kelly. She also had a series regular role in the CW series Life Is Wild as Mia Weller, for 13 episodes. At the 2006 Best of Fest Awards at the KIDS FIRST! Film and Video Festival, Mouser received the Outstanding Performance Award for her voiceover work in Eloise: The Animated Series. Mouser also guest starred on Lie to Me and in Ghost Whisperer as the character Madison.

Mouser starred in the ABC medical drama Body of Proof as Dana Delany's daughter, Lacey Fleming. Mouser also played the roles of both Savannah O’Neal and Emma Reynolds in the Disney Channel Original movie Frenemies, which was released in 2012.

Since 2018, Mouser played high school and karate student Samantha "Sam" LaRusso, in the Cobra Kai series, initially launched by YouTube Premium and later on Netflix, where she is part of the main cast. Mouser has also appeared on a Mind Field episode (S2 E5) on the channel VSauce on YouTube. In 2024, she voiced the character Cleo in the audiobook Know Your Newlywed.

== Personal life ==
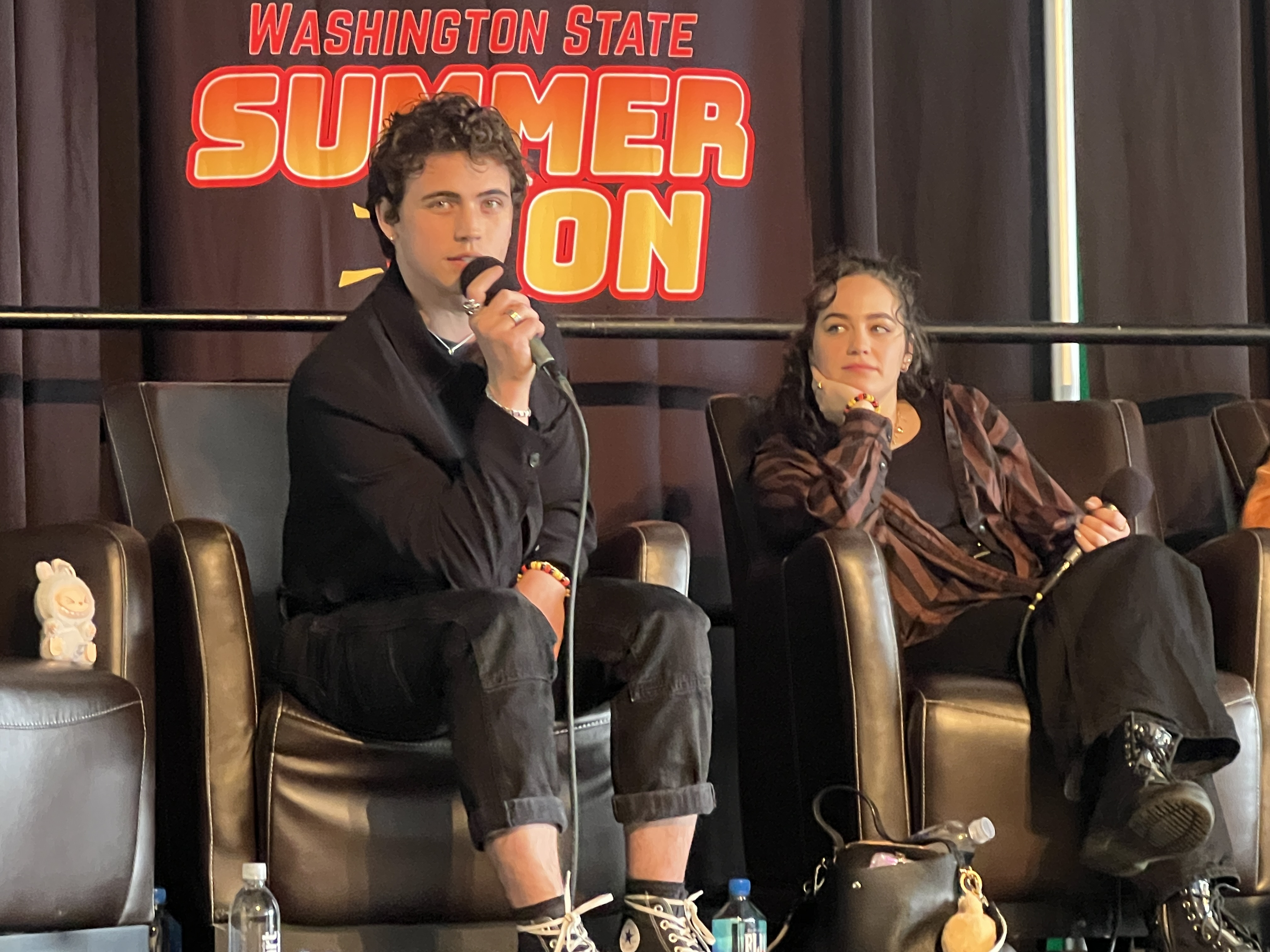
Mouser with her Cobra Kai co-star and fiancé Tanner Buchanan at a convention in 2025

In 2009, Mouser was diagnosed with type 1 diabetes.

Mouser and actor Tanner Buchanan announced their engagement in February 2025. They met in October 2017 during the filming of the first season of the series Cobra Kai.

== Filmography ==
=== Films ===
Year	Title	Role	Notes
2005	Pom Poko	Additional Voices	
2005	Son of the Mask	Alvey Avery (voice)	
2005	Tarzan II	(voice)	Video
2005	Final Fantasy VII: Advent Children	Additional voices	
2006	Holly Hobbie and Friends: Christmas Wishes	Lill (voice)	Video short
2006	Mr. Fix It	Christine Pastore	
2007	LA Blues	Sara	
2007	Penny Dreadful	Clara Fowler	Short film
2008	Dragon Hunters	Zoé (voice)	
2008	Delgo	Baby Delgo (voice)	
2008	Ball Don't Lie	Julia	
2009	Bride Wars	(voice)	
2009	The Hole	Annie (voice)	
2011	All Kids Count	Carla	
2014	Medeas	Ruth	
2014	Field of Lost Shoes	Libby Clinedinst	
2014	Alexander and the Terrible, Horrible, No Good, Very Bad Day	Audrey Gibson	
2019	Gates of Darkness	Michelle Tade	

=== Television ===
Year	Title	Role	Notes
2004	Without a Trace	Amy Rose	Episode: "Nickel and Dimed: Part 2"
2005	Scrubs	Little Girl	Episode: "My Lips Are Sealed"
2005	Monk	Princess Girl	Episode: "Mr. Monk Goes Home Again"
2005	Inconceivable	Kylie	Episode: "Between an Egg and a Hard Place"
2005	CSI: Crime Scene Investigation	Cassie McBride	Episode: "Gum Drops"
2005	The King of Queens	Marissa	Episode: "Move Doubt"
2005–2012	NCIS	Kelly Gibbs	Recurring role, 9 episodes
2006	Mindy and Brenda	Young Girl	Television film
2006–2007	Eloise: The Animated Series	Eloise	Voice role; main role; 13 episodes
2007	A Stranger's Heart	Cricket	Television film
2007	State of Mind	Ashley Petrovsky	
2007–2008	Life Is Wild	Mia Weller	Main role, 13 episodes
2008	Life	Carin Sutter	Episode: "Black Friday"
2009	Lie to Me	Tyler Seeger	Episode: "Control Factor"
2009–2010	Chowder	Marmalade / Ambrosia	Voice role; episodes: "A Faire to Remember", "Chowder Grows Up"
2010	Ghost Whisperer	Madison	Episode: "Dead to Me"
2011–2013	Body of Proof	Lacey Fleming	Main role, 36 episodes
2012	Frenemies	Emma Reynolds	Television film
2012	Frenemies	Savannah O'Neal	Television film
	Drop Dead Diva	Chloe Surnow	Episode: “Crushed”
2013–2015	The Fosters	Sarah	Episodes: "Saturday", "The Fallout," "Not That Kind of Girl"
2014	Saint Francis	Kimberly Quinlan	Television film
2014	Scandal	Karen Grant	Episodes: "Like Father, Like Daughter," "Baby, It's Cold Outside"
2014	Criminal Minds	Rebecca Farland	Episode: "Amelia Porter"
2015	Maron	Sydney Maron	Episode: "Marc's Niece"
2015	The Devil You Know	Earth Fenn	Unsold television pilot
2015	CSI: Cyber	Shelby Lockhart	Episode: "iWitness"
2016	Freakish	Mary Jones	Hulu original series
2017	Scorpion	Ada Pearce	Episode: "Don't Burst My Bubble"
2018–2025	Cobra Kai	Samantha "Sam" LaRusso	Main role, 65 episodes
2018	Happy Together	Diane	Episode: "How Jake and Claire Met"
2019	Room 104	Adrianne/Lisa	Episode: "Prank Call"
2022	Nailed It!	Herself	Episode: "Cobra Kai"

== Awards and nominations ==
Year	Award	Category	Work	Result
2008	Young Artist Award	Best Performance in a TV Movie, Miniseries or Special – Supporting Young Actress	A Stranger's Heart	Nominated
2008	Young Artist Award	Best Performance in a TV Series – Supporting Young Actress	Life Is Wild	Nominated
