= Nic Bishop =

Australian actor

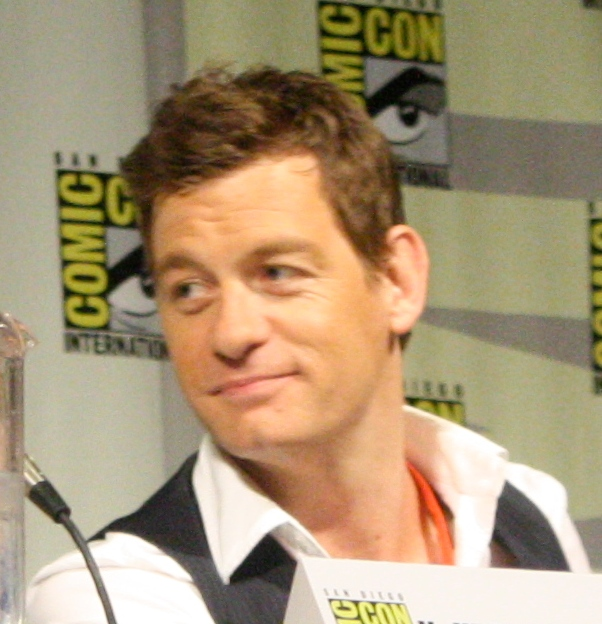
- Bishop at San Diego Comic-Con in 2009
- Born: Nicholas Bishop; Swindon, England, United Kingdom
- Occupation: Actor
- Years active: 1994–present
- Partner: Jes Macallan (engaged)
- Children: 3

Nicholas Bishop, commonly credited as Nic Bishop, is an English-born Australian actor. He is best known for his television roles as Detective Peter Baker on the soap opera Home and Away (2004–07) and as Peter Dunlop on the ABC medical drama Body of Proof (2011–2012).

== Early life ==
Bishop was born in Swindon, England. His parents immigrated to Australia when he was six months old and the family settled in Canberra, Australian Capital Territory. His father was a former Australian Army officer and diplomat. Bishop attended Radford College in Canberra, graduating in 1991.

Bishop graduated from Australia's National Institute of Dramatic Art (NIDA) with a degree in performing arts (acting) in 1996, and has been a regular screen acting tutor there since 1997. He was a 2006 Australia Day Ambassador.

== Career ==
Bishop is most recognised by his role for four seasons as Detective Peter Baker in the Australian series Home and Away. In 2002, Bishop appeared in the critically acclaimed film Walking on Water. Additional television credits include Past Life, Hustle, McLeod’s Daughters, Heartbreak High, Water Rats, Blue Heelers, Farscape, White Collar Blue and All Saints. He also starred in the movies The Sugar Factory (1998), Occasional Coarse Language (1998), My Mother Frank (2000), Punishment and The Land of the Astronauts (2010). In 2011, he guest starred in an episode of the USA Network series Necessary Roughness entitled "Anchor Management".

Bishop co-starred in the first two seasons of Dana Delany's medical drama television series Body of Proof in which he played medico-legal investigator Peter Dunlop, assistant to Medical Examiner Dr. Megan Hunt. In May 2011, it was announced that Body of Proof was renewed for a second season for the fall of 2011. He was written out of the show after two seasons. In June 2014 Bishop played Ryan McQuaid, a former Navy SEAL turned private contractor billionaire in Season 5 of Covert Affairs.

== Personal life ==
Bishop resides in West Hollywood, California. In 2021, he got engaged to American actress Jes Macallan.. The pair welcomed their first child in 2023.

== Filmography ==
=== Film ===
Year	Film	Role	Notes
1998	The Sugar Factory	Mitchell Lawrence	Feature film
1998	Occasional Coarse Language	David Radcliffe	Feature film
2000	My Mother Frank	Mick	Feature film
2002	Walking on Water	Frank	Feature film
2010	Black Limousine (aka The Land of the Astronauts)	Thomas Bower	Feature film
2014	The Mentor	Brian May	TV film
2015	Woodlawn	Coach Tandy Gerelds	Feature film
2017	The Lears	Kent Lear	Feature film

=== Television ===
Year	Film	Role	Notes
1998	Wildside	Det. Con. Graham Hawley	TV series
1999	Water Rats	Shane Bookman	TV series, episode: "Quad Squad"
1999	Murder Call	Marshall Bowdon	TV series, episode: "Cut & Dried"
1999	Powderburn	Jess	
2000	Above the Law	Matt Bridges	TV series, 35 episodes
2001	Flat Chat		TV series, episode: "Valentine's Day"
2001	Blue Heelers	Nigel Kellett	TV series, 2 episodes
2001	Farscape	Ghebb Dellos	TV series, 1 episode
2002	All Saints	Nicholas Carroll	TV series, episode: "All the Right Reasons"
2003	White Collar Blue	Lachlan Shaw	TV series, 5 episodes
2004–07	Home and Away	Detective Peter Baker	TV series, 164 episodes
2007	Hustle	Plummy	TV series, episode: "Signing Up to Wealth"
2008	Punishment	Jonah Walton	TV series
2008	McLeod's Daughters	Russ Conners	TV series, 2 episodes
2010	Past Life	Price Whatley	TV series, 9 episodes
2011	Necessary Roughness	Griffin Page	TV series, episode: "Anchor Management"
2011–12	Body of Proof	Peter Dunlop	TV series, 29 episodes
2012	The Glades	Eddie Ryder	TV series, episode: "Endless Summer"
2013	Hot in Cleveland	Liam	TV series, episode: "Extras"
2013	NCIS: Los Angeles	David Inman	TV series, episode: "Kill House"
2013	CSI: Crime Scene Investigation	Tom Scola	TV series, episode: "In Vino Veritas"
2013	Castle	Fire Chief Miller	TV series, episode: "Under Fire"
2014	Fat Tony & Co	Det. Sgt. Paul Dale	TV series, 5 episodes
2014	Covert Affairs	Ryan McQuaid	TV series, season 5 (main cast)
2015	Dominion	Gates Foley	TV series, season 2 (recurring role)
2021	Legends of Tomorrow	General Kilgore	TV series, episode: "Bay of Squids"
2021	Legends of Tomorrow	Sheriff Levi Stapleton	Episode: "Stressed Western"
2021	Legends of Tomorrow	Mike the Strike	Episode: "The Final Frame"

== Theatre ==
Year	Film	Role	Notes
1994	The Bride of Gospel Place	Smithy the Liar	NIDA Parade Theatre
1994	Did You Hear the One About the Irishman...?		NIDA Parade Theatre
1995	A Month in the Country	Ignaty Spigelsky	NIDA Parade Studio
1995	A Midsummer Night’s Dream	Lysander	NIDA Parade Theatre
1995	Sexual Perversity in Chicago		NIDA Parade Theatre
1996	The Merchant of Venice	Lorenzo	NIDA Parade Theatre
1996	The Pajama Game	Pete / Dancer	NIDA Parade Theatre
1996	The Bear / The Song Room / Baby Doll		NIDA Parade Theatre

=== As director ===
Year	Film	Role	Notes
2003	Godspell	Director	Riverina Playhouse, Wagga Wagga
