= Sonja Sohn =

American actress (born 1964)

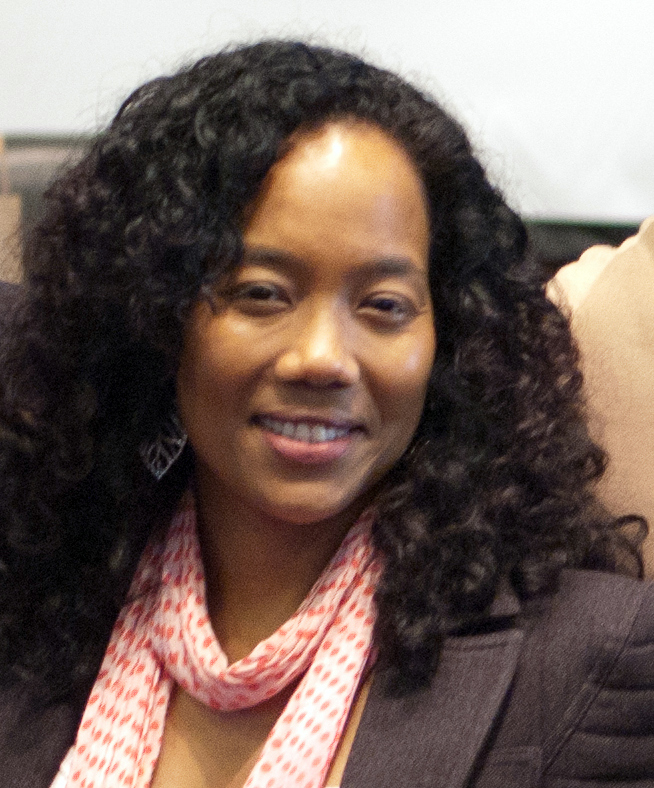
- Sohn in 2011
- Born: Sonja Denise Williams; May 9, 1964 (age 62); Fort Benning, Georgia, U.S.
- Occupations: Actress; activist; filmmaker
- Years active: 1996–present
- Spouse: Adam Plack (m. 2003; div. 2011)
- Children: 2

Sonja Denise Plack (née Williams), known professionally as Sonja Sohn, (born May 9, 1964) is an American actress, filmmaker, and activist, best known for portraying Baltimore detective Kima Greggs in the HBO drama The Wire (2002–2008). She is also known for having starred in the 1998 independent film Slam, which she co-wrote, and appearing as Samantha Baker in the ABC series Body of Proof and as GBI Chief Amanda Wagner in the ABC series Will Trent. She is also the founder and CEO of the Baltimore-based outreach program, ReWired for Change, which focuses on the rehabilitation of at-risk youth who have engaged in criminal behavior.

== Early life ==
Sohn was born Sonja Denise Williams in Fort Benning, Georgia. Her mother was Korean and her father was American. Her parents met when her father was stationed in South Korea after the Korean War.

Sohn grew up in Newport News, Virginia, and graduated from Warwick High School there.

== Career ==
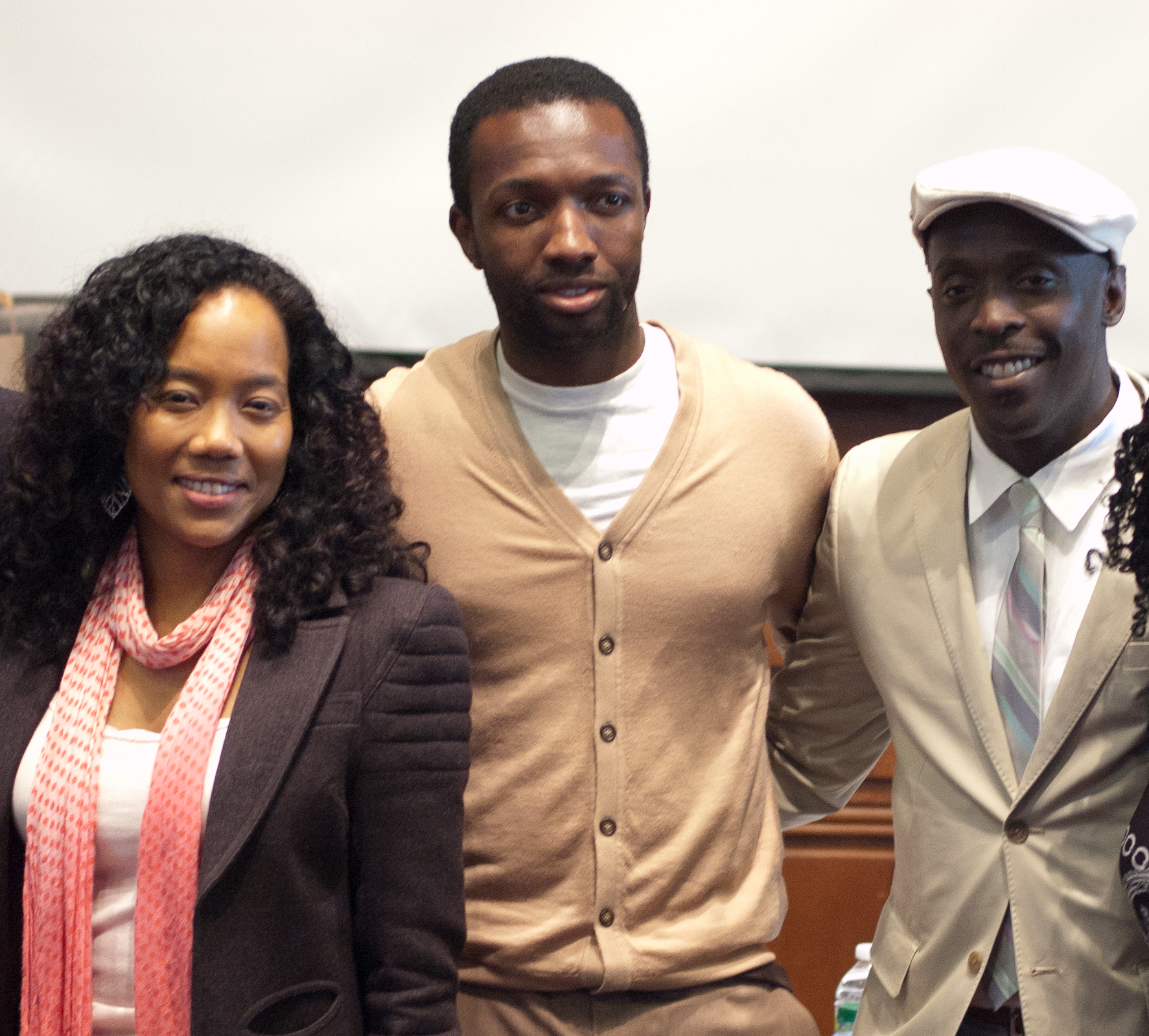
Sohn (left) with The Wire co-stars, Jamie Hector (middle) and Michael K. Williams

Williams became professionally known as Sonja Sohn. Before she was an actress, Sohn was a slam poet. While performing her work on stage, she was spotted by Marc Levin who offered her a role in his film Slam. She also wrote lyrics and co-wrote the script for the film. It went on to win the Grand Jury Prize for Dramatic Film at the Sundance Film Festival. After debuting in Slam, Sohn appeared in minor roles in films such as Shaft and Bringing Out the Dead. She also starred in independent films Perfume, G and The Killing Zone.

Through the five seasons of the HBO series The Wire, she held a starring role as Detective Kima Greggs. She also guest-starred on many episodes of Cold Case as "Toni Halstead". She won the supporting television actress award at the 2008 Asian Excellence Awards for her character on The Wire.

She had a supporting role in the Hollywood film Step Up 2: The Streets. In 2008-09, she was a guest star in the ABC series Brothers & Sisters, and in 2010 she appeared in an episode of CBS series The Good Wife. In 2011, she was a guest star on the show Bar Karma. She played Detective Samantha Baker in the first two seasons of the medical drama television series Body of Proof with Dana Delany and Jeri Ryan, which premiered on ABC on March 29, 2011.

Sohn joined season 2 of The Originals in a recurring role as the witch Lenore a.k.a. Esther Mikaelson.

Sohn made her directorial debut with the 2017 HBO documentary Baltimore Rising about the 2015 Baltimore protests and community organizing that arose in response to police violence. In 2021, Sohn directed The Slow Hustle, a documentary about the death of Baltimore Homicide Detective Sean Suiter, which was fictionally portrayed in the HBO miniseries We Own This City.

Sohn was cast as a series regular in ABC's police drama Will Trent. Sohn plays Amanda, the head of the Georgia Bureau of Investigation and Trent's (Ramón Rodríguez) boss. The pilot episode aired January 3, 2023.

== Activism ==
Previously involved in political activism (she campaigned in North Carolina in support of Barack Obama's 2008 presidential bid), Sohn took a break from acting in 2009 to concentrate on social issues. She is the founder and CEO of the Baltimore-based ReWired for Change, an outreach program intended to communicate with (and ultimately rehabilitate) at-risk youth involved in criminal activity.

The program is run out of the University of Maryland School of Social Work and uses episodes of The Wire as a teaching tool, encouraging the participants to examine and query their lives and past actions. Other actors and writers involved with The Wire serve as board members.

In 2011, she was presented with the Woman of the Year award from the Harvard Black Men's Forum.

== Personal life ==
Sohn has two daughters with her first husband, photographer Harvey Wang. In 2003, Sohn married didgeridoo player Adam Plack, but the couple divorced in 2011.

On July 21, 2019, Sohn was arrested in North Carolina and charged with felony possession of cocaine.

== Filmography ==
=== Film ===
| Year | Title | Role | Notes |
|---|---|---|---|
| 1996 | Work | June | |
| 1998 | Slam | Lauren Bell | |
| 1999 | Getting to Know You | Lynn | |
| 1999 | Bringing Out the Dead | Kanita | |
| 2000 | Shaft | Alice | |
| 2001 | Perfume | Dandy | |
| 2002 | G | Shelly | |
| 2003 | The Killing Zone | Jennifer | |
| 2004 | The Industry | Narrator (voice) | Video |
| 2008 | Step Up 2: The Streets | Sarah | |
| 2012 | The Wire: The Musical | Shakima 'Kima' Greggs | Short |
| 2015 | The Missing Girl | Franny | |
| 2016 | Domain | Atlanta | |
| 2019 | High Flying Bird | Myra | |
| 2023 | Big George Foreman | Nancy Foreman | |
| 2023 | Breakwater | Bonnie | |

=== Television ===
| Year | Title | Role | Notes |
|---|---|---|---|
| 2002–2008 | The Wire | Shakima 'Kima' Greggs | 56 episodes (Season 1–5) |
| 2006–2007 | Cold Case | Toni Halstead | 5 episodes (Season 4–5); 4 episodes in Season 4; 1 episode in Season 5 |
| 2008–2009 | Brothers & Sisters | Trish Evans | 4 episodes (Season 3) |
| 2010–2013 | The Good Wife | Sonya Rucker | 2 episodes (Season 1 & 5) |
| 2011 | Bar Karma | Lucy Borden | Episode: "An Open Mind" |
| 2011–2012 | Body of Proof | Samantha Baker | 29 episodes (Season 1–2) |
| 2012 | Drop Dead Diva | Judge Vivian Holston | Episode: "Jane's Getting Married" |
| 2012 | Burn Notice | Agent Olivia Riley | 5 episodes (Season 6) |
| 2013 | Law & Order: Special Victims Unit | Lisa Carter | Episode: "American Tragedy" |
| 2014–2015 | The Originals | Lenore Shaw | 8 episodes (Season 2) |
| 2015 | Last Week Tonight with John Oliver | Police Officer | Episode: "Public Defenders" |
| 2016 | Luke Cage | Captain Betty Audrey | 3 episodes (Season 1) |
| 2016 | Shut Eye | Detective Gabriella | 5 episodes (Season 1) |
| 2017 | Incorporated | Chairman Fisher | 2 episodes |
| 2018–2021 | The Chi | Laverne Johnson | 11 episodes (Season 2–4); 9 episodes in Season 1; 1 episode each in Season 3 & 4 |
| 2019 | Godfather of Harlem | Nell | Episode: "Rent Strike Blues" |
| 2019–2021 | Star Trek: Discovery | Dr. Gabrielle Burnham | 5 episodes (Season 2–4); 3 episodes in Season 2; 1 episode each in Season 3 & 4 |
| 2020 | Interrogation | Marjorie Thompson | Episode: "L.A. County Psychologist Marjorie Thompson vs. Eric Fisher 1984" |
| 2020 | Utopia | Agent Katherine Milner | 3 episodes |
| 2023 | See It Loud: The History of Black Television | Herself | Documentary miniseries; 3 episodes |
| 2023–2026 | Will Trent | Amanda Wagner | 58 episodes (Season 1–4) |

=== Director ===
| Year | Title |
|---|---|
| 2017 | Baltimore Rising |
| 2021 | The Slow Hustle |

== Awards and nominations ==
| Year | Award | Category | Film or series | Result |
|---|---|---|---|---|
| 1998 | Gotham Awards | Breakthrough Actor | Slam | Won |
| 1998 | Sundance Film Festival | Grand Jury Prize | Slam | Won |
| 1998 | Independent Spirit Awards | Best Debut Performance | Slam | Nominated |
| 2005 | Image Awards | Outstanding Supporting Actress in a Drama Series | The Wire | Nominated |
| 2008 | Asian Excellence Awards | Outstanding Television Actress | The Wire | Won |
| 2009 | Image Awards | Outstanding Supporting Actress in a Drama Series | The Wire | Nominated |
| 2022 | News and Documentary Emmy Awards | Outstanding Crime and Justice Documentary | The Slow Hustle | Nominated |
| 2024 | Astra Awards | Best Supporting Actress in a Broadcast Network or Cable Series, Drama | Will Trent | Nominated |
