= Windell Middlebrooks =

American actor (1979–2015)

- Middlebrooks in a Miller High Life beer advertisement in 2009.
- Born: Windell Dwain Middlebrooks, Jr. January 8, 1979; Fort Worth, Texas, U.S.
- Died: March 9, 2015 (aged 36); San Fernando Valley, California, U.S.
- Other name: Windell D. Middlebrooks
- Education: Sterling College
- Occupation: Actor
- Years active: 2005–2015

Windell Dwain Middlebrooks, Jr. (January 8, 1979 – March 9, 2015) was an American actor and singer. Most famous as a TV pitchman for Miller High Life beer, Middlebrooks also starred in The Suite Life on Deck and Body of Proof.

== Early life ==
Middlebrooks was born on January 8, 1979, in Fort Worth, Texas. He was an alumnus of Sterling College in Sterling, Kansas, where he earned a Bachelor's degree in Theatre/Communications, the Los Angeles Film Studies Center, and University of California, Irvine, where he earned a Master of Fine Arts in acting in 2004.

== Career ==
For one season, he worked at the famed Texas Musical Drama, near Canyon, Texas. He started as a hospitality employee, yet he would go on to have a successful acting career on the stage and screen. Middlebrooks worked on The Suite Life on Deck, Hannah Montana, My Name is Earl, and Chocolate News. He is best known for his Miller High Life beer ads, playing a deliveryman who, if he considers the situation to be adverse to "the high life" (such as an expensive restaurant or a skybox at a baseball game), will confiscate all the Miller High Life from the location. He appeared in HBO's Entourage and portrayed a recurring character in the ninth season of Scrubs.

Middlebrooks was a guest on Adam Carolla's podcast on April 2, 2009. He also appeared on It's Always Sunny in Philadelphia as a character who marries a transgender ex-love of Mac and has a child with her, of which Dee is the surrogate mother. He appeared as a regular cast member in the medical/procedural drama television series Body of Proof, playing an assistant coroner. The show premiered on ABC in March 2011 and ended in May 2013.

== Personal life ==
Middlebrooks was awarded the Chancellor's Club Fellowship at University of California, Irvine.

He was a Christian.

=== Death ===
On March 9, 2015, Middlebrooks was found unconscious at his home in the San Fernando Valley, pronounced dead on arrival at a Los Angeles hospital. An autopsy revealed that he suffered a fatal pulmonary embolism. One or more arteries in his lungs had become blocked by a blood clot. Middlebrooks was 36 years old.

== Filmography ==
Year	Title	Role	Notes
2005	Weekends at the DL	Reggie Shanks / Mohammed	2 episodes
2005	The Bernie Mac Show	Boogie	Episode: "Pop Pop Goes the Weasel"
2006	Julie Reno: Bounty Hunter	Windelle	Pilot episode
2006	All of Us	Sugar Scoops Ice Cream Man	Episode: "Pretty Woman"
2007	My Name is Earl	Landlord	Episode: "Kept a Guy Locked in a Truck"
2007	Veronica Mars	Big Scary Man / Happy	Episode: "Poughkeepsie, Tramps and Thieves"
2007	Hannah Montana	Plumber	Episode: "You Gotta Not Fight for Your Right to Party"
2007	Entourage	Delivery Guy	Episode: "Gary's Desk"
2008	Chocolate News	Black Ice	2 episodes
2008	ER	Arnie	Episode: "Let It Snow"
2009	Ace in the Hole	Don Braxton	TV movie
2009	Miss March	Bouncer No. 1	Movie
2009	Parks and Recreation	Brian	Episode: "Boys' Club"
2009	Enlightened!	Free Bird	Short
2009–2010	Scrubs	Captain Duncook	6 episodes
2010	Cougar Town	Gerald	Episode: "Everything Man"
2008–2010	The Suite Life on Deck	Kirby Morris	10 episodes (season 1–3)
2010	It's Always Sunny in Philadelphia	Nick	2 episodes
2012	Body of Proof: The Musical	Curtis Brumfield	Short
2011–2013	Body of Proof	Curtis Brumfield	Main cast, 42 episodes
2013	TMI Hollywood	Host/Various	1 episode
2014	The Mason Twins	Chance	TV movie
2014	Mighty Med	Mr. Patterson / Agent Blaylock	2 episodes
2015	Blunt Talk	Terrence Hibert	Episode: "A Beaver That's Lost Its Mind"
2015	Road Hard	Reggie	Movie (Premiered three days before his death)
