= Body of Proof =

2011 American medical drama television series

- Genre: Medical drama; Crime drama; Comedy-drama
- Created by: Christopher Murphey
- Starring: Dana Delany; Jeri Ryan; John Carroll Lynch; Nicholas Bishop; Sonja Sohn; Geoffrey Arend; Windell Middlebrooks; Mary Mouser; Mark Valley; Elyes Gabel
- Theme music composer: Daniel Licht
- Composer: Trevor Morris (season 3)
- Country of origin: United States
- Original language: English
- No. of seasons: 3
- No. of episodes: 42 (list of episodes)

Production
- Executive producers: Matthew Gross; Christopher Murphey; Sunil Nayar; Evan Katz
- Producers: Matthew V. Lewis; James Kleverweis
- Running time: 42 minutes
- Production companies: Matthew Gross Entertainment; Arcturus Productions (2011–2013) (seasons 2–3); ABC Studios

Original release
- Network: ABC
- Release: March 29, 2011 – May 28, 2013

Body of Proof is an American medical/crime comedy-drama television series that ran on ABC from March 29, 2011, to May 28, 2013, and starred Dana Delany as medical examiner Dr. Megan Hunt. The series was created by Christopher Murphey and produced by ABC Studios. On May 10, 2013, ABC canceled the series after three seasons.

== Overview ==
The series stars Dana Delany as Dr. Megan Hunt, a top-flight neurosurgeon, until she has a life-changing motor-vehicle accident that leaves her impaired, following which she then accidentally kills a patient on the operating table. This results in her resignation and retirement from the profession altogether.

Now working as a medical examiner, Dr. Hunt balances the demands of her professional life, including solving cases and forensic analysis, with her personal life and efforts to reconnect with her estranged daughter.

== Production ==
Though set in Philadelphia, the first season of Body of Proof was filmed in Providence, Rhode Island, and some other locations including Warwick and Woonsocket, Rhode Island. The medical examiner's office is actually the GTECH HQ / Providence Warwick Visitors Bureau and surrounding buildings superimposed on the real Philadelphia skyline. The series was originally titled Body of Evidence, but was later renamed Body of Proof.

The second season of the show was announced to be filmed in Los Angeles to take advantage of a $7 million tax credit. Body of Proof is the third ABC television series starring Dana Delany in a main character role, the first being the role of Colleen McMurphy in China Beach and the second being Katherine Mayfair in Desperate Housewives.

While filming, real-life technical advisers made sure that the procedures were correct. Jeri Ryan said, "We've got technical advisers that will be with us on set, so we can keep all of the science realistic".

== Cast and characters ==
=== Main cast ===
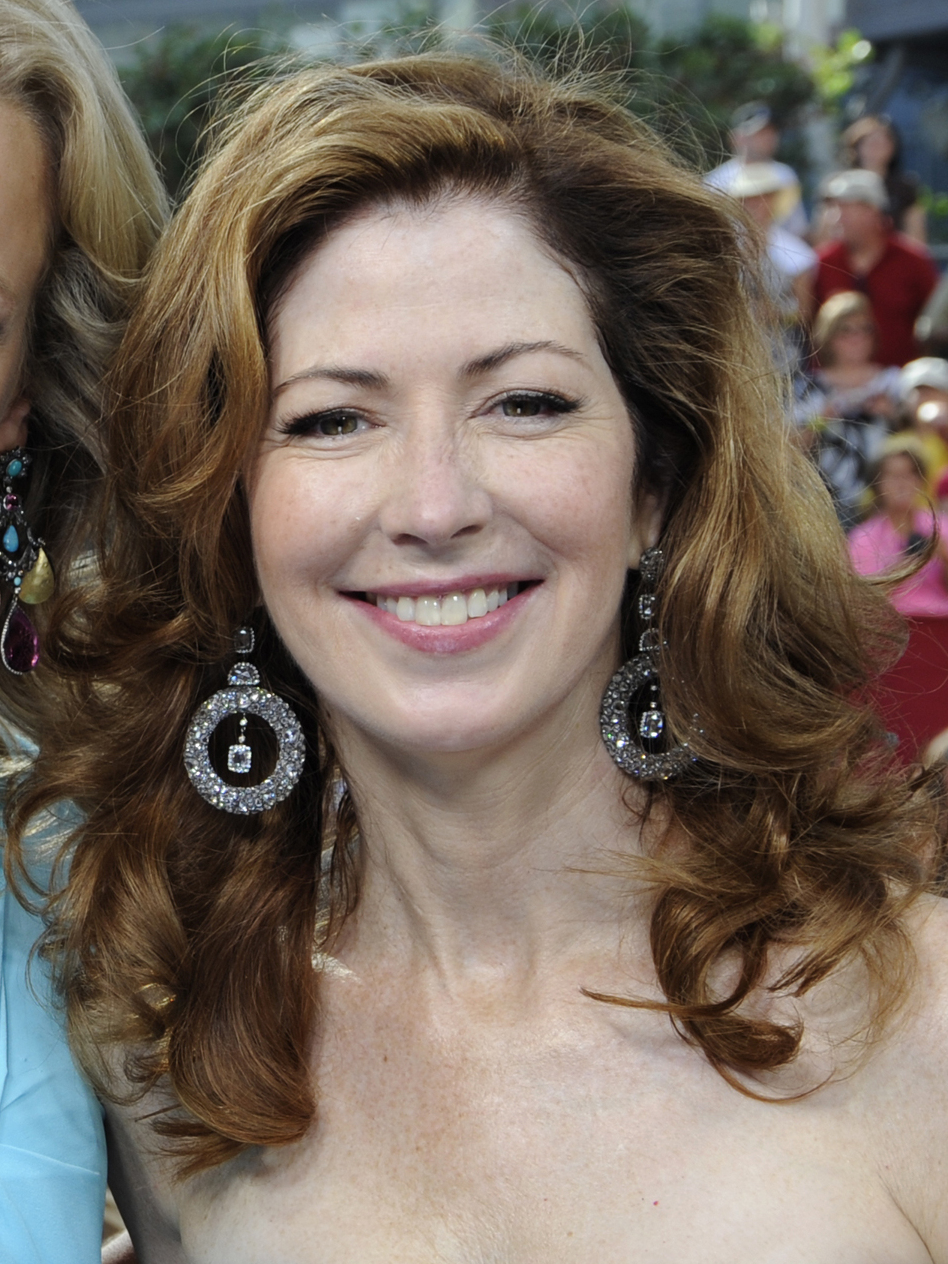
The show focuses on Megan Hunt, played by Dana Delany (pictured).

- Dana Delany as Megan Hunt
- Jeri Ryan as Kate Murphy
- Geoffrey Arend as Ethan Gross
- Windell Middlebrooks as Curtis Brumfield
- John Carroll Lynch as Bud Morris (seasons 1–2)
- Sonja Sohn as Samantha Baker (seasons 1–2)
- Nicholas Bishop as Peter Dunlop (seasons 1–2)
- Mary Mouser as Lacey Fleming (seasons 2–3; 1, recurring)
- Mark Valley as Tommy Sullivan (season 3)
- Elyes Gabel as Adam Lucas (season 3)

=== Recurring cast ===
- Jeffrey Nordling as Todd Fleming
- Joanna Cassidy as Joan Hunt
- Cliff Curtis as Derek Ames
- Nathalie Kelley as Dani Alvarez
- Jamie Bamber as Aiden Welles
- Luke Perry as CDC Officer/Health Commissioner Charlie Stafford
- Annie Wersching as Yvonne Kurtz
- Richard Burgi as District Attorney Dan Russell
- Lorraine Toussaint as Police Chief Angela Martin
- Marisa Ramirez as Officer Riley Dunn
- Micah Berkley as Officer James Wood

== Episodes ==
Season	Episodes	Originally released		Rank	Average viewership (in millions)
Season	Episodes	First released	Last released	Rank	Average viewership (in millions)
1	9	January 25, 2011 (Italy); March 29, 2011	February 22, 2011 (Italy); May 17, 2011	13	13.35
2	20	September 20, 2011	April 10, 2012	44	9.89
3	13	February 19, 2013	May 28, 2013	34	10.38

== Release ==
=== Broadcast ===
The show was set to premiere on Friday nights on ABC on October 22, 2010. Following the quick cancellations of Thursday-night drama My Generation and Wednesday-night drama The Whole Truth, though, the network held back the series. The series premiered Tuesday, March 29, 2011, at 10:00 pm Eastern/9:00 pm Central, replacing Detroit 1-8-7. The last of its nine first-season episodes aired May 17, 2011, four days after ABC renewed the series for a second season. The show's second season ran from September 20, 2011, to April 20, 2012, and had a total of 20 episodes, four of which were held over from the first season. On May 11, 2012, ABC officially renewed Body of Proof for a third season of 13 episodes. Season 3 premiered on Tuesday, February 19, 2013, at 10:00 pm Eastern/9:00 pm Central, and ended on May 28, 2013.

On May 10, 2013, in spite of improved ratings, Body of Proof was cancelled by ABC after three seasons. Immediately after the cancellation news, reports arose that the series might be picked up by a cable television network, with TNT, USA Network, and WGN America all showing interest. On May 23, 2013, a representative for ABC Studios confirmed that Body of Proof would not move to a new network.

On October 23, 2013, the show was reported as possibly being revived for a fourth season by ABC due to much of the broadcaster's new slate underperforming. On November 11, 2013, Dana Delany confirmed that Body of Proof would not return for another season.

=== International broadcasts ===
In the United Kingdom, the series premiered on July 19, 2011, on Alibi, channel head Steve Hornsey said of picking up the series, "As TV's ultimate compendium of crime drama, Alibi aims to select the very best series in the genre from around the globe. Body of Proof is exactly that. A stand-out show that promises to be a huge hit in the US, Body of Proof means more premium and exclusive content for the channel – and more thrilling and engaging viewing for our audience." In Ireland, the show premiered March 10, 2012, on RTÉ1.

== Home media ==
Season	Episodes	Title	DVD release dates						
Season	Episodes	Title	Region 1	Disc #	Region 2		Region 4		Disc #
Season	Episodes	Title	Region 1	Disc #	Eps.	Date	Eps.	Date	Disc #
1	9	The Complete First Season	September 20, 2011	2	13	November 5, 2012	13	August 15, 2012	3
2	20	The Complete Second Season	September 18, 2012	4	16	March 4, 2013	16	December 5, 2012	4
3	13	The Complete Third Season	June 18, 2013	3	13	November 11, 2013	TBA	TBA	

- The Region 2 + 4 DVDs of season 1 contain the episodes in production order, rather than the order they were aired in. This has resulted in them including 4 episodes which were filmed in season 1 but aired as part of season 2.

== Reception ==
=== Critical response ===
The show was met with mixed reviews: Metacritic summarizes the opinions of 21 critics in giving the show's first season a score of 56 out of 100. Entertainment Weekly included the show in the 10 TV events to look forward to in 2011.

Critic David Hinckley from the New York Daily News gave the show a positive review, noting it "would be interesting enough if it were just Quincy with better legs. Add the other elements and you have something worth checking out at 10 o'clock". Other reviews were more negative, commenting on the clichéd plot and character development. Las Vegas Weekly critic Josh Bell commented that "The problem is that Megan's personal issues are as clichéd and clumsily presented as her boilerplate murder cases, and the show makes strained connections between the two that don’t really hold together." The Detroit News called it "saggy, predictable and preachy, the series debut was delayed for months and still doesn't have what it takes to impress viewers. What a poor replacement for Detroit 1-8-7." The Los Angeles Times said "Murphey and the writers will have to do a lot of heavy lifting for Body of Proof to transcend its immediate predictability. There's only so much Delany can do with a cardboard show. God may be in the details, but the walls still have to hold."

=== Ratings ===
The series premiere (Tuesday, March 29, 2011) drew 14 million viewers. It finished in the top 10 in Nielsen ratings for the week, and was the second-most watched premiere of the 2010–11 season, following the CBS series Hawaii Five-0. ABC ran the second episode on Sunday April 3, 2011; it dropped to 8.5 million viewers. The third episode aired two days later and drew 11 million viewers; the show again won its time slot. The first season averaged 13.68 million viewers making it the second most-watched scripted drama on ABC.

Season	Timeslot (EST)	Number of Episodes	Premiere		Finale		TV Season	Overall rank	18–49 rank	Overall viewership
Season	Timeslot (EST)	Number of Episodes	Date	Viewers (millions)	Date	Viewers (millions)	TV Season	Overall rank	18–49 rank	Overall viewership
1	Tuesday 10:00 pm	9	March 29, 2011	13.94	May 17, 2011	10.33	2010–11	#13	TBA	13.35
2	Tuesday 10:00 pm	20	September 20, 2011	9.65	April 10, 2012	10.05	2011–12	#44	TBA	9.89
3	Tuesday 10:00 pm	13	February 19, 2013	6.75	May 28, 2013	7.45	2012–13	#34	TBA	10.39

=== Awards and nominations ===
Organization	Category	Nominee(s)	Result
Environmental Media Awards	Television Episodic Drama	Broken Home	Nominated

== See also ==
- List of fictional medical examiners
