= List of Body of Proof episodes =

Body of Proof title card

Body of Proof is an American medical drama television series that aired on ABC from March 29, 2011, to May 28, 2013. It was created by Chris Murphey and produced by ABC Studios. It mainly focuses around Dana Delany's character Megan Hunt. During the course of the series, 42 episodes of Body of Proof aired over three seasons.

== Series overview ==
Season	Episodes	Originally released		Rank	Average viewership (in millions)
Season	Episodes	First released	Last released	Rank	Average viewership (in millions)
1	9	January 25, 2011 (Italy); March 29, 2011	February 22, 2011 (Italy); May 17, 2011	13	13.35
2	20	September 20, 2011	April 10, 2012	44	9.89
3	13	February 19, 2013	May 28, 2013	34	10.38

== Episodes ==
=== Season 1 (2011) ===
No. overall	No. in season	Title	Directed by	Written by	Original release date	Prod. code	US viewers (millions)
1	1	"Pilot"	Nelson McCormick	Christopher Murphey	January 25, 2011 (Italy); March 29, 2011 (U.S.)	101	13.94
2	2	"Letting Go"	Nelson McCormick	Christopher Murphey & Matthew Gross	February 1, 2011 (Italy); April 3, 2011 (U.S.)	102	8.49
3	3	"Helping Hand"	John Terlesky	Corey Miller	February 8, 2011 (Italy); April 5, 2011 (U.S.)	107	11.15
4	4	"Talking Heads"	Christine Moore	Diane Ademu-John	February 15, 2011 (Italy); April 12, 2011 (U.S.)	106	11.06
5	5	"Dead Man Walking"	Matthew Gross	Christopher Murphey	February 22, 2011 (Italy); April 19, 2011 (U.S.)	110	11.37
6	6	"Society Hill"	Kate Woods	Matthew V. Lewis	March 1, 2011 (Italy); April 26, 2011 (U.S.)	105	11.86
7	7	"All in the Family"	John Polson	Sam Humphrey	March 8, 2011 (Italy); May 3, 2011 (U.S.)	104	10.23
8	8	"Buried Secrets"	David Platt	Christopher Murphey & Sunil Nayar	March 15, 2011 (Italy); May 10, 2011 (U.S.)	103	10.11
9	9	"Broken Home"	Nelson McCormick	Andrew Dettman	March 22, 2011 (Italy); May 17, 2011 (U.S.)	108	10.33

=== Season 2 (2011–12) ===
No. overall	No. in season	Title	Directed by	Written by	Original release date	Prod. code	US viewers (millions)
10	1	"Love Thy Neighbor"	Christine Moore	Corey Miller	September 20, 2011	201	9.41
11	2	"Hunting Party"	Paul Holahan	Christopher Murphey	September 27, 2011	202	9.19
12	3	"Missing"	Eric Laneuville	Matthew V. Lewis	October 4, 2011	112	9.95
13	4	"Lazarus Man"	Stephen Cragg	Andrew Dettmann	October 11, 2011	203	9.00
14	5	"Point of Origin"	Nathan Hope	Bryan Oh	October 18, 2011	109	9.27
15	6	"Second Chances"	Dwight Little	Sam Humphrey	October 25, 2011	111	9.43
16	7	"Hard Knocks"	Christine Moore	Sunil Nayar	November 1, 2011	113	9.90
17	8	"Love Bites"	Christine Moore	Sam Humphery	November 15, 2011	204	9.76
18	9	"Gross Anatomy"	Eric Laneuville	Diane Ademu-John	November 29, 2011	205	9.49
19	10	"Your Number's Up"	John Putch	Matthew V. Lewis	December 6, 2011	206	7.23
20	11	"Falling For You"	Christine Moore	Matthew Gross	January 3, 2012	208	7.05
21	12	"Shades of Blue"	Kenneth Fink	Lawrence Kaplow	January 10, 2012	207	6.90
22	13	"Sympathy for the Devil"	Christine Moore	Sunil Nayar	January 17, 2012	210	7.94
23	14	"Cold Blooded"	Nelson McCormick	Allen MacDonald	February 14, 2012	209	6.26
24	15	"Occupational Hazards"	Matthew Gross	Corey Miller	February 21, 2012	211	6.64
25	16	"Home Invasion"	John Terlesky	Andrew Dettman	February 28, 2012	212	6.83
26	17	"Identity"	Michael Grossman	Christopher Murphey	March 13, 2012	213	7.46
27	18	"Going Viral, Part 1"	Alex Zakrzewski	Matthew V. Lewis & Lawrence Kaplow	March 27, 2012	214	9.72
28	19	"Going Viral, Part 2"	Tom Verica	Diane Ademu-John	April 3, 2012	215	10.51
29	20	"Mind Games"	David Solomon	Story by : Caren Rubenstone; Teleplay by : Allen Macdonald	April 10, 2012	216	10.05

=== Season 3 (2013) ===
No. overall	No. in season	Title	Directed by	Written by	Original release date	Prod. code	US viewers (millions)
30	1	"Abducted – Part 1"	Michael Watkins	Christopher Murphey	February 19, 2013	301	6.75
31	2	"Abducted – Part 2"	Ralph Hemecker	Evan Katz	February 26, 2013	302	6.37
32	3	"Lost Souls"	David Von Ancken	Allen MacDonald	March 5, 2013	305	6.59
33	4	"Mob Mentality"	Christine Moore	Alexi Hawley	March 12, 2013	304	6.60
34	5	"Eye for an Eye"	Alex Zakrzewski	Corey Miller	March 19, 2013	307	8.42
35	6	"Fallen Angel"	Christine Moore	Diane Ademu-John	March 26, 2013	306	9.59
36	7	"Skin and Bones"	Michael Grossman	Alexi Hawley	April 2, 2013	308	8.56
37	8	"Doubting Tommy"	Michael Grossman	Matthew L. Lewis	April 9, 2013	309	8.98
38	9	"Disappearing Act"	Sam Hill	Christopher Murphey	April 16, 2013	310	8.94
39	10	"Committed"	Eric Laneuville	Allen MacDonald	April 23, 2013	311	9.35
40	11	"Dark City"	John Terlesky	Diane Ademu-John	May 7, 2013	312	8.24
41	12	"Breakout"	Milan Cheylov	Krystal Houghton Ziv	May 14, 2013	303	8.60
42	13	"Daddy Issues"	John Terlesky	Corey Miller	May 28, 2013	313	7.64

== Webisodes ==
=== Outbreak ===
No.	Title	Directed by	Written by	Original release date
1	"Outbreak: Part 1"	Unknown	Corey Miller	March 27, 2012
2	"Outbreak: Part 2"	Unknown	Corey Miller	March 28, 2012
3	"Outbreak: Part 3"	Unknown	Corey Miller	March 29, 2012
4	"Outbreak: Part 4"	Unknown	Corey Miller	April 2, 2012
5	"Outbreak: Part 5"	Unknown	Corey Miller	April 3, 2012
