= Relativity (Star Trek: Voyager) =

- Star Trek: Voyager episode
- Episode no.: Season 5 Episode 24
- Directed by: Allan Eastman
- Story by: Nick Sagan
- Teleplay by: Bryan Fuller; Nick Sagan; Michael Taylor
- Cinematography by: Marvin V. Rush
- Production code: 218
- Original air date: May 12, 1999
- Running time: 45 minutes (runtime)

Guest appearances
- Bruce McGill - Captain Braxton; Dakin Matthews - Admiral Patterson; Jay Karnes - Lt. Ducane; Josh Clark - Lt. Joe Carey; Tarik Ergin - Lt. Ayala (uncredited)

Episode chronology
← Previous "11:59"	Next → "Warhead"
- Star Trek: Voyager season 5

"Relativity" is the 118th episode of the American science fiction television series Star Trek: Voyager airing on the UPN network. It is the 24th episode of the fifth season.

Set in the 24th century, the series follows the adventures of the Federation starship Voyager during its journey home to Earth, having been stranded tens of thousands of light-years away. In this episode, Seven of Nine (Jeri Ryan) is recruited from the future to prevent the present-time destruction of her ship. The episode also features a number of guest stars and a scene back at planet Earth.

This episode was written by Nick Sagan & Bryan Fuller & Michael Taylor, and directed by Allan Eastman.

== Plot ==
A 29th century Starfleet vessel, the timeship Relativity, is attempting to stop the detonation of an explosive planted on Voyager during its travel through the Delta Quadrant in the 24th century, which is causing a time paradox. Captain Braxton (Bruce McGill) and his crew are unable to detect where on Voyager the explosive is located, so they recruit Seven of Nine, pulling her out of the time stream moments before Voyager's destruction, as her enhanced Borg visual sensors can aid in the device's detection. Seven is sent back in time, disguised as a Starfleet ensign, to the point where Voyager is still in drydock prior to her maiden voyage and being inspected by Captain Kathryn Janeway (Kate Mulgrew). Janeway detects Seven's anomalous presence just as Seven locates the bomb. Relativity recalls Seven before she is discovered, but the travel through time kills her on return.

Knowing where the bomb is located, Relativity recalls a slightly earlier version of Seven, and after explaining the scenario, send her back again, now to a point where Voyager has been pulled into the Delta Quadrant and fighting the Kazon, prior to when Seven had joined its crew. Seven's presence is discovered by Voyager, and she is captured; Janeway recognizes her from drydock. Seven explains the situation to Janeway, and together they locate the device, discovering that it was planted by a future version of Braxton himself.

Seven is able to jump back in time to try to stop Braxton from planting the device, but he escapes to the day that Voyager would be destroyed. Seven follows, but the stress of time travel has taken its toll on her body; nevertheless, she is able to warn the Voyager crew of the problem and to apprehend Braxton. The crew of the Relativity, having taken their Braxton into custody as well, recruit a version of Janeway as they did with Seven, and send her back to the past at the Kazon attack, where she is able to secure Braxton before he can plant the device. The crew of Relativity pull the time travelers back to their present, re-integrating the various copies with themselves. It is learned that Braxton, after the events of "Future's End", had to spend several years in rehabilitation before being reassigned for duty, and started to blame Voyager for all the problems that he encountered as they patrolled the timestream, seeing its destruction as a means to end his suffering. Lieutenant Ducane (Jay Karnes), one of Braxton's officers, sends Janeway and Seven back to their proper time streams, allowing them to retain their memories of the events but ordering them never to discuss them with anyone.

== Reception ==
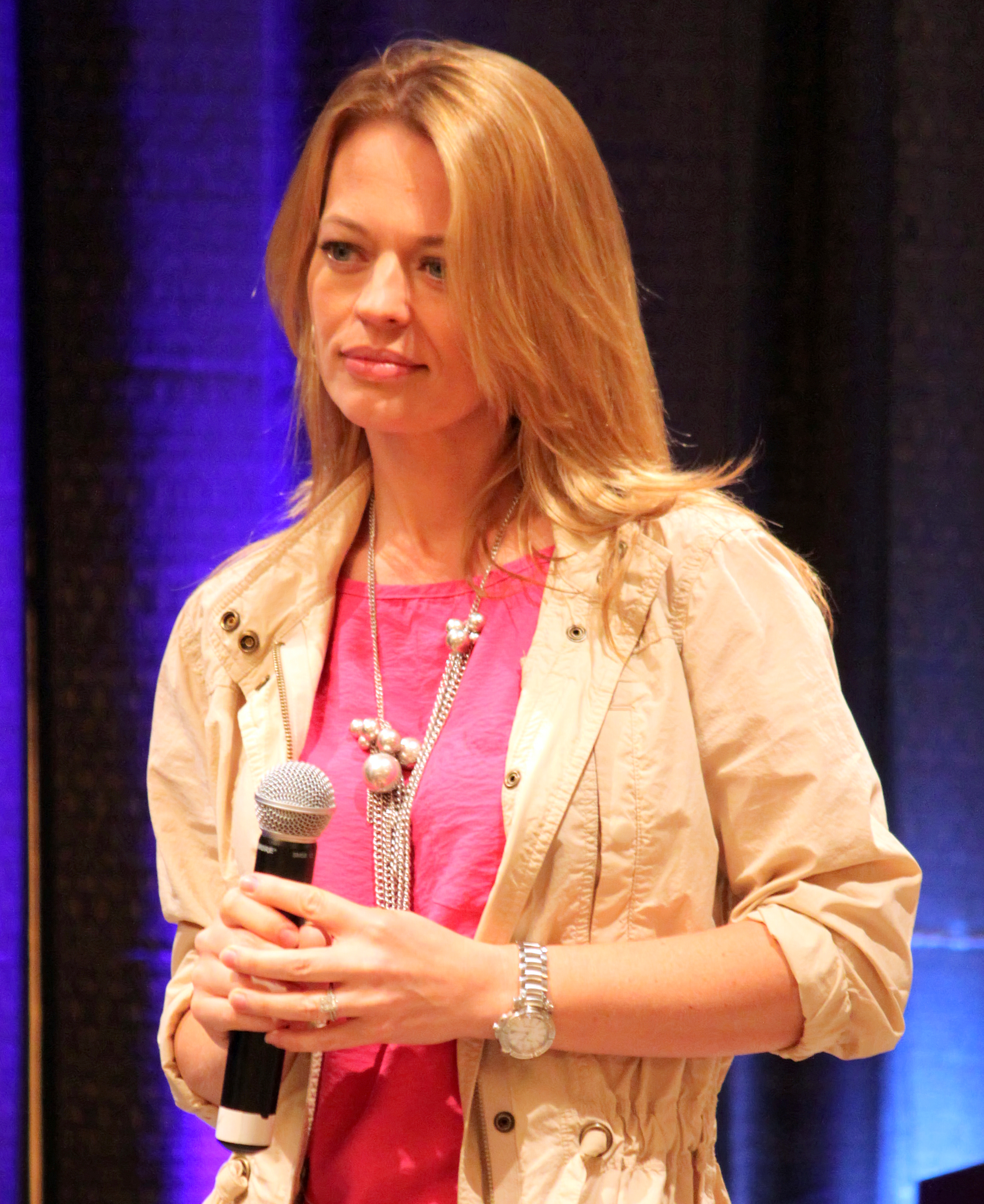
Jeri Ryan, at a Star Trek convention in 2010. She plays the main character of this episode, Voyager crew, Seven of Nine.

Den of Geek ranked "Relativity" among the top 50 of all Star Trek episodes.

Screen Rant said this was the tenth-best episode of Star Trek: Voyager, based on IMDb rating of 8.6 out of 10. io9 ranked this one of the "must watch" episodes from the series.

Den of Geek suggested "Relativity" for a binge-watching guide that focused on Star Trek: Voyager episodes featuring time travel. "Relativity" was noted by SyFy Wire as 14 of 15 of the top time travel episodes in the Star Trek franchise. Comic Book Resources (CBR) ranked this one of the top-twenty time-travel-themed episodes of all Star Trek series. CBR also rated the spacecraft from the 29th century featured in this episode, the Relativity, the 4th-most-powerful spacecraft in the Star Trek universe, noting its ability to transport people across time and space.

SyFy Wire called it a "fun, ticking-clock caper", pointing it out as an example of fresh exploration of time travel in the Star Trek franchise, commending it as an "exciting episode" with an "impressive" plot-twist ending.

Tor.com said this was a good vehicle for Seven, and were also very happy with Janeway, giving the episode 8 out 10. They were a bit confused about the details of the time-travel plot, but noted references to other episodes and films in the Star Trek universe and overall felt it was a fun time-travel story. They were happy with the guest stars, especially Jay Karnes and Bruce McGill, who they said were "two of the finer actors of our time."

Dany Roth, writing for SyFy Wire, ranked this the 5th best episode that Bryan Fuller wrote for; they felt the time travel plot was a bit confusing but were happy with the focus on Seven and Janeway. They felt it was about as a good as Star Trek: Voyager gets and thought it was a winner, concluding it was "Stupid. Senseless. And an absolute joy."

In 2022, SyFy Wire included "Relativity" as one of the 12 (Note: The SyFy Wire article treats the two-part / two-season episodes of "Scorpion" as one episode, doing the same for the similarly structured "Unimatrix Zero", when counting the number of episodes included in its list of 12.) "essential" Seven of Nine episodes in the franchise.

== Releases ==
"Relativity" was released on LaserDisc in Japan on June 22, 2001, as part of 5th Season vol.2, which included episodes from "Dark Frontier" to "Equinox, Part I". The episode had two audio tracks, English and Japanese. This set had 6 double sided 12" optical discs giving a total runtime of 552 minutes.

On November 9, 2004, this episode was released as part of the season 5 DVD box set of Star Trek: Voyager. The box set includes 7 DVD optical discs with all the episodes in season 5 with some extra features, and episodes have a Dolby 5.1 Digital Audio track.

== See also ==
- "Future's End" – the third season two-part episode where Voyager has its first encounter with Captain Braxton (portrayed there by Allan G. Royal)
- "Timeless" – the events of which are referred to by Braxton (as "the temporal inversion in the Takara sector")
- "Year of Hell" (VOY S4E8-E9)
