= Jay Karnes =

American actor

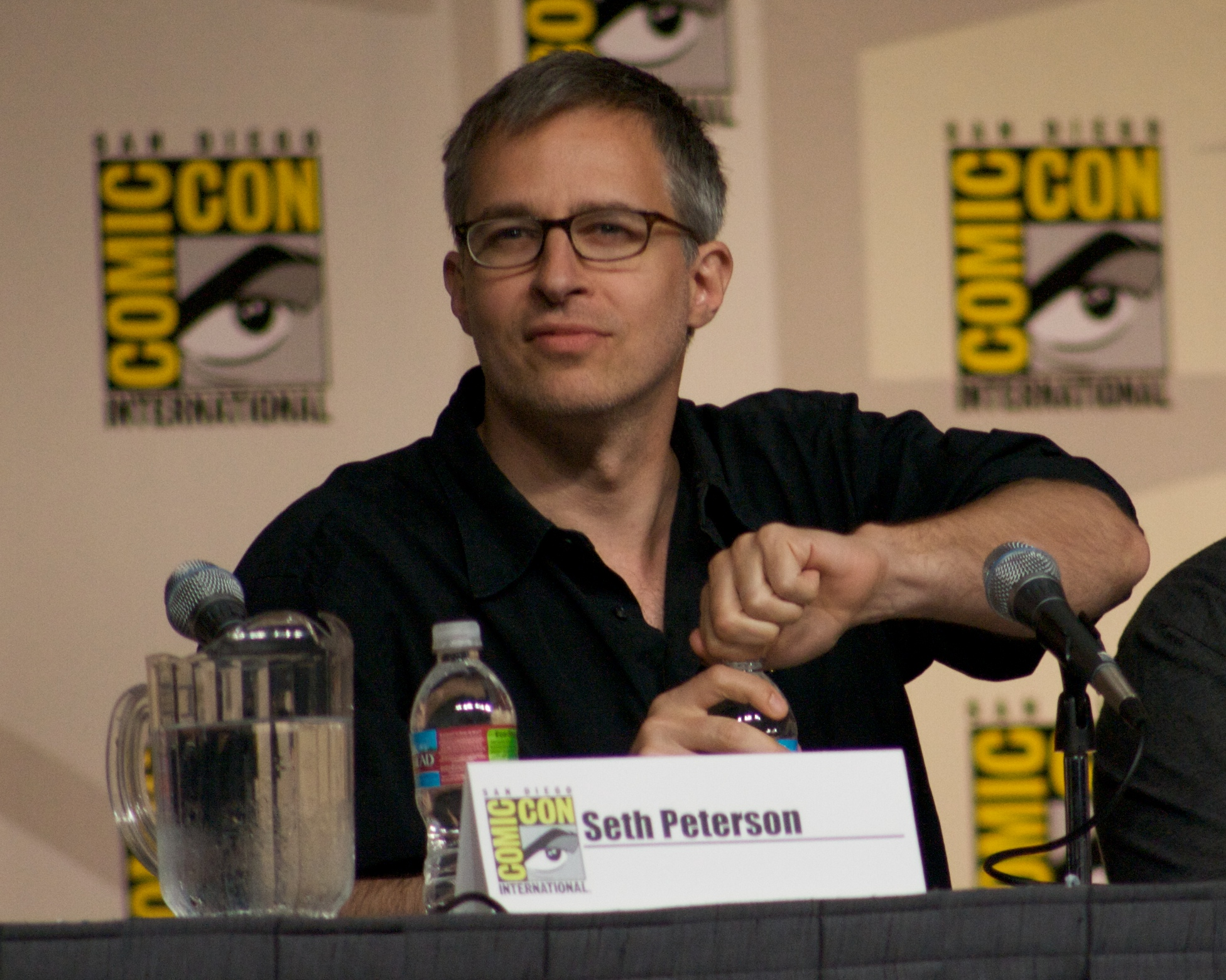
- Karnes in July 2009
- Born: June 27, 1963 (age 63); Omaha, Nebraska, U.S.
- Education: University of Kansas
- Occupation: Actor
- Years active: 1998–present
- Spouse: Julia Campbell (m. 1997)

Jay Karnes (born June 27, 1963) is an American actor, best known for his role as LAPD detective Holland "Dutch" Wagenbach on the FX television series The Shield, Agent Josh Kohn on Sons of Anarchy (2008), and Craig on The Crossing (2018).

== Early life and education ==
Karnes was born in Omaha, Nebraska. He graduated from the University of Kansas in 1989.

== Career ==
In the mid-1990s, Karnes was a company member with the Oregon Shakespeare Festival, playing major roles in such plays as Love's Labours Lost and Tom Stoppard's Arcadia. Karnes also starred in the films The Joyriders (1999) and The Next Best Thing (2000).

From 2002 to 2008, Karnes portrayed Detective Holland "Dutch" Wagenbach on The Shield.

In 2008, Karnes played the recurring role of ATF Agent Josh Kohn on FX Network's series Sons of Anarchy, created by writer/actor Kurt Sutter of The Shield. Kohn was an antagonist to SAMCRO's vice president Jax Teller and his sometime girlfriend Tara Knowles. That same year, Karnes also appeared in the films Chasing 3000 and Broken Angel.

Karnes was featured in season 2 of V (2009) and was set to appear as a main character in season 3.

From 2009 to 2010, Karnes had a recurring role on Burn Notice as Tyler Brennan, a sinister gunrunner with a predilection for kidnapping relatives of those he wishes to leverage.

In 2011, Karnes appeared in the Body of Proof episode "Hunting Party". In 2012, he played Secretary of Defense William Curry in a recurring role on ABC's Last Resort. In 2013, Karnes appeared in the pilot episode of Jeff Eastin's drama series Graceland, as Supervising Agent Gerry Silvo. In 2014, Karnes appeared in FOX's series, Gang Related, as Agent Carter of IAD, as well as in the film Jayhawkers, as the chancellor of the University of Kansas.

Throughout his acting career Karnes has made guest appearances on several TV shows, including Frasier, Judging Amy, Chicago Hope, Cold Case, Criminal Minds, The Pretender, Grimm, Star Trek: Voyager (as Lieutenant Ducane in the season 5 episode "Relativity"), House, Scandal, and Stalker.

== Filmography ==
=== Film ===
| Year | Title | Role | Notes |
|---|---|---|---|
| 1999 | The Joyriders | Donald Trout | |
| 2000 | The Next Best Thing | Kevin's Lawyer | |
| 2008 | Broken Angel | Michael Levy | |
| 2009 | Donkey Punch | William | Video short |
| 2010 | Chasing 3000 | Adult Roger Straka | |
| 2010 | Leonie | Dr. Rumely | |
| 2011 | Set Up | Russell | |
| 2011 | Hide | Charlie Marvin | TV film |
| 2014 | Jayhawkers | Chancellor Franklin Murphy | |
| 2016 | Before I Wake | Peter | |
| 2018 | Headlock | Dr. Nelson | completed |

=== Television ===
| Year | Title | Role | Notes |
|---|---|---|---|
| 1998 | The Pretender | Brad Anderson | Episode: "Collateral Damage" |
| 1998 | From the Earth to the Moon | Investigator | Episode: "Apollo One" |
| 1998 | Chicago Hope | David Ross | Episode: "Physician, Heal Thyself" |
| 1999 | Star Trek: Voyager | Lieutenant Ducane | Episode: "Relativity" |
| 1999 | Pensacola: Wings of Gold | Jonah Stoddard | Episode: "Tattoo" |
| 1999 | The Strip | Jerome Parker | Episode: "Even Better Than The Real Thing" |
| 1999–2005 | Judging Amy | ASA Ron Russell / Don Russell / Dr. McGrath | 3 episodes |
| 2000 | Ally McBeal | Simon Prune | Episode: "Boy Next Door" |
| 2000 | Nash Bridges | Mark Torry | Episode: "Hard Cell" |
| 2001 | Frasier | Corporate Guy | Episode: "Bully for Martin" |
| 2002–2008 | The Shield | Detective Holland "Dutch" Wagenbach | 88 episodes; Also in the 2007 video game |
| 2004 | Cold Case | Artie Russo | Episode: "It's Raining Men" |
| 2005 | Numb3rs | Martin Rausch | Episode: "Better or Worse" |
| 2008 | Sons of Anarchy | Agent Joshua Kohn | 7 episodes |
| 2008–2011 | CSI: Crime Scene Investigation | I.A. Detective Schultz / I.A. Officer Wagenbach | 2 episodes |
| 2009 | House | Nick Greenwald | Episode: "The Social Contract" |
| 2009–2010 | Burn Notice | Tyler Brennen | 4 episodes |
| 2010 | Brothers & Sisters | Roy Scovell | 4 episodes |
| 2010 | Law & Order: LA | Jim Roman | Episode: "Echo Park" |
| 2011 | V | Chris Bolling | 4 episodes |
| 2011 | The Glades | Dr. Sloan | Episode: "Dirty Little Secrets" |
| 2011 | The Protector | James | Episode: "Revisions" |
| 2011 | Body of Proof | Martin Loeb | Episode: "Hunting Party" |
| 2011 | CSI: Miami | Andrew Nolan | Episode: "Long Gone" |
| 2012 | Criminal Minds | Hamilton Bartholomew | Episode: "Unknown Subject" |
| 2012 | Last Resort | Secretary of Defense William Curry | 7 episodes |
| 2013 | Law & Order: Special Victims Unit | Noah Bunning | Episode: "Secrets Exhumed" |
| 2013 | Scandal | Phil Stanner | Episode: "Top of the Hour" |
| 2013 | Graceland | Gerry Silvo | Episode: "Graceland" |
| 2013 | Grimm | Detective Bauer | Episode: "PTZD" |
| 2014–2018 | Chicago P.D. | FBI Agent William Graff | 2 episodes |
| 2014 | Gang Related | Paul Carter | 10 episodes |
| 2014 | Stalker | Psychiatrist Adam Lewis | Episode: "Crazy for You" |
| 2015 | Complications | Cancer Clinics Owner | Episode: "Critical Condition" |
| 2016–2018 | 12 Monkeys | Agent Robert Gale | 5 episodes |
| 2016 | Tyrant | James Kitfer | 3 episodes |
| 2018 | The Crossing | Craig Lindauer | 7 episodes |
| 2021 | Magnum P.I. | Colin Braggs | Episode: "Tell No One" |
| 2021 | FBI: Most Wanted | Cecil Walsh | Episode: "Lovesick" |
| 2022 | Star Trek: Picard | Agent Wells | 2 episodes |
| 2025 | The Night Agent | Dr. Wilfred Cole | 3 episodes |
