= Future's End =

- Star Trek: Voyager episodes
- Episode nos.: Season 3 Episodes 8 & 9
- Directed by: David Livingston (part I); Cliff Bole (part II)
- Written by: Brannon Braga; Joe Menosky
- Cinematography by: Marvin V. Rush
- Production codes: 150 & 151
- Original air dates: November 6, 1996; November 13, 1996

Guest appearances
- Sarah Silverman - Rain Robinson; Allan G. Royal - Captain Braxton; Ed Begley Jr. - Henry Starling; Brent Hinkley - Butch; Clayton Murray - Porter; Susan Patterson - Ensign Kaplan; Christian Conrad - Dunbar; Barry Wiggins - Policeman

Episode chronology
← Previous "Sacred Ground"	Next → "Warlord"
- Star Trek: Voyager season 3

"Future's End" is a two-part episode from the third season of the American science fiction television series Star Trek: Voyager, the eighth and ninth of the season and the 50th and 51st overall. "Future's End" made its debut on American television in November 1996 on the UPN network in two separate broadcasts, on November 6 and 13, 1996.

Set in the 24th century, the series follows the adventures of the Federation starship Voyager during its journey home to Earth, having been stranded tens of thousands of light-years away. In this episode, Voyager is thrown back to Earth in 1996 and must find a way back to the 24th century while making sure they do not cause a disaster in the 29th century in the process.

Part one was directed by David Livingston and part two by Cliff Bole, with a story by Brannon Braga and Joe Menosky. Guest stars include Sarah Silverman and Ed Begley Jr.

== Plot ==
=== Part I ===
A small ship with a Federation signature emerges from a temporal rift in front of the starship Voyager. Its pilot identifies himself as Captain Braxton (Allan Royal) from the 29th century in the timeship Aeon. He has come to destroy Voyager, believing it to be the cause of a temporal explosion that will wipe out most of the Solar System in his time. Voyager fights off Braxton's attack, resulting in Braxton being sent back through the rift. Voyager and its crew are also pulled into the rift and find themselves on Earth in 1996.

Braxton crashes in 1967, where Henry Starling (Ed Begley Jr.) finds Aeon and copies its technology, allowing him to found a company, Chronowerx Industries, and start the micro-computer revolution. In 1996, a young astronomer named Rain Robinson (Sarah Silverman) who works at the Griffith Observatory in Los Angeles detects Voyager in high orbit and assumes it to be extraterrestrial life. Her work is funded by Starling, but against his instructions, she attempts to contact Voyager by transmitting a greeting to it, alarming the crew. The Voyager crew tracks her location to the Observatory and Captain Janeway, Commander Chakotay, Lt. Tuvok (Tim Russ), and Lt. Paris (Robert Duncan McNeill), decide to beam down to Los Angeles. Tuvok and Paris save Robinson from a hitman Starling dispatched to kill her.

Janeway and Chakotay investigate Starling and his business. They identify a homeless man as Captain Braxton, who explains the rise of Starling to them. Ultimately, they learn that Starling's planned attempt to travel to the 29th century using Braxton's timeship will be the true cause for the temporal explosion, because Starling lacks the knowledge needed to properly calibrate the timeship.

Janeway and Chakotay secretly enter Starling's Chronowerx office where they find the Aeon, just as Starling walks in on them. Starling ignores Janeway's warning not to use the timeship and tries to kill them, but the officers are beamed aboard Voyager. When Voyager tries to beam up the timeship, Starling uses his own transporter beam to access Voyager's computer and study its systems, including stealing the Doctor's program from Sickbay. Worse still, Voyager has been sighted and filmed, since the ship had to descend low into Earth's atmosphere to beam Janeway and Chakotay aboard.

=== Part II ===
Following Starling's computer attack, Voyager is badly damaged, leaving Paris and Tuvok stranded on Earth with Robinson. Paris convinces her to help by claiming that he and Tuvok are government agents trying to recover highly advanced technology that was stolen by Starling. Robinson, prompted by Paris and Tuvok, arranges to meet Starling at a public park. To keep an eye on the Doctor, Starling equips the Doctor with a piece of 29th-century technology, a "Mobile Holo-Emitter", which allows him to move around without having to rely on fixed emitters.

During the meeting, Chakotay and Torres take a shuttle into Earth's lower atmosphere, planning to abduct Starling and beam him aboard Voyager. Unfortunately, damage taken during the transport forces Chakotay and Torres to crash in the Arizona desert, where they are captured by isolationists. Tuvok and the Doctor, splitting up from Paris and Robinson, are able to rescue them and begin repairs on the shuttle.

Held prisoner on Voyager, Starling admits to Janeway that he intends to travel into the future to steal more advanced technology because he has reached the limit of what he can create by studying the Aeon. Janeway informs him of Captain Braxton's warning about the disaster he will cause, but Starling is too egotistical to believe he can fail. Just when Janeway believes that she has ended Starling's plans, one of his henchmen transports him back to his office. Paris and Robinson arrive there to discover a large truck, which they believe contains the timeship. They pursue the vehicle out of the city, aided by the arrival of the repaired shuttle. Too late, the truck is found to be a decoy, and Starling launches the Aeon, still at the Chronowerx building.

After a last attempt to dissuade Starling, Janeway manually fires a photon torpedo into the Aeon, destroying it and saving the future. A few moments later, an alternative Captain Braxton arrives in another timeship Aeon, explaining that having detected the anomaly of their presence in the past, he has come to return them to their own time at the place they left it. Sadly, he is unwilling to bring them to their Earth, as that would violate the Temporal Prime Directive. Voyager returns to the exact moment they first encountered the Aeon. The Doctor gains more freedom as he keeps the Mobile Holo-Emitter.

== Production ==
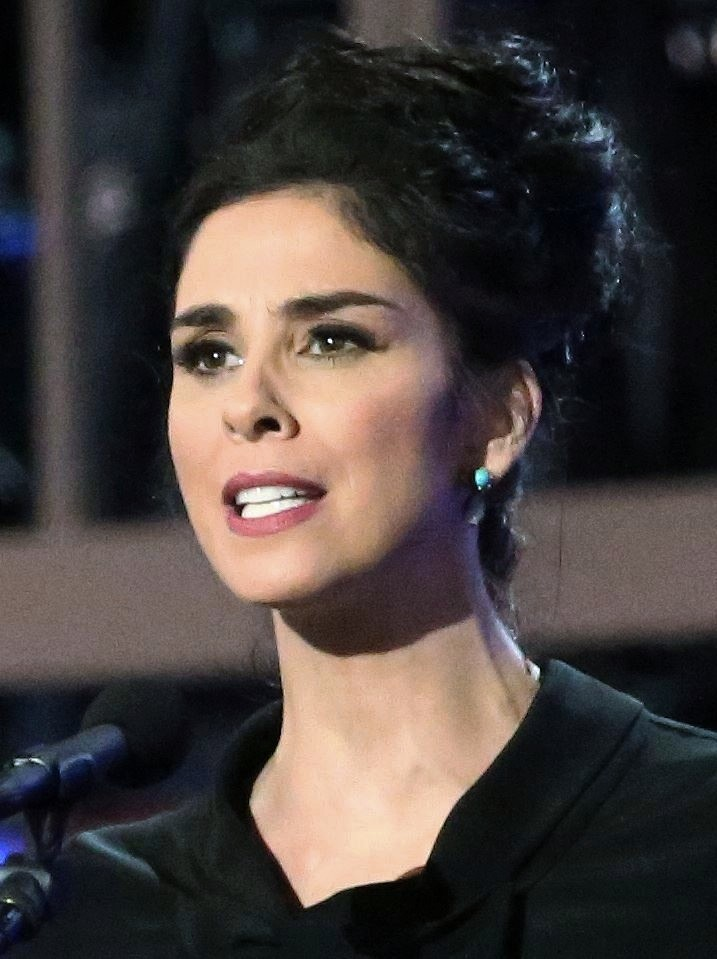
This episode is noted for casting Sarah Silverman

The episode used Santa Monica Pier as a shooting location for the boardwalk scene. Other production locations in the region include the Griffith Observatory, Jerry Moss Plaza outside The Music Center in downtown Los Angeles, and Palisades Cliffside Park.

Guest stars include Sarah Silverman as Rain Robinson, Allan G. Royal as Braxton, and Ed Begley Jr. as Starling.

== Reception ==
The Hollywood Reporter ranked "Future's End" (Part I & II) as the 60th greatest Star Trek overall franchise episodes. They noted the episode(s) had "plenty of charm" and praised the comedy by the Paris and Tuvok characters. io9 ranked "Future's End" as the 93rd best episode of the Star Trek franchise in their list of the top 100 Star Trek episodes. Fatherly ranked this episode as one of the top 10 episodes of the overall Star Trek franchise for kids to watch. ScreenRant ranked "Future's End" as the 7th best time-travel themed episode of the overall Star Trek franchise, and praised the storyline and its consequences.

SyFy ranked the "Future's End" pair as one of the top ten episodes of Star Trek: Voyager. The Dispatch, noted "Future's End" as the best episode yet, noting that it had "much excitement and crackling dialogue." A Star Trek: Voyager binge-watching guide by Wired suggested this episode could not be skipped. Tor.com included this as one of six episodes of Star Trek: Voyager that are worth re-watching, noting it was a fun time travel romp with brilliant guest casting.

Regarding actress-comedian Sarah Silverman, Den of Geek said that she was the tenth best guest star on Star Trek: Voyager for her role as Rain Robinson, a 20th century astronomer who encounters the crew of Voyager. Star Trek writer Bryan Fuller said Silverman was considered as a cast regular starting with Season 3 of Star Trek: Voyager. The filming locations in southern California have also been noted, including Santa Monica Pier, Griffith Observatory, downtown Los Angeles, and Palisades Cliffside Park, etc. The Digital Fix said the episode was a "loving homage" to Star Trek IV: The Voyage Home, and Silverman was a "great guest star" and overall felt it was fun romp in the 1990s. Variety also noted Silverman for guest starring.

The Comic Book Resources site listed the futuristic but tiny Aeon, as one of the most powerful ships in the entire Star Trek franchise.

== Releases ==
"Future's End" was released on LaserDisc in Japan on June 25, 1999, as part of the 3rd season vol.1 set.

"Future's End" was released on DVD on July 6, 2004, as part of Star Trek Voyager: Complete Third Season, with Dolby 5.1 surround audio. The season 3 DVD was released in the UK on September 6, 2004.

In 2017, the complete Star Trek: Voyager television series was released in a DVD box set, which included "Future's End" as part of the season 3 discs.

== Notes ==
- Star Trek writer and producer Bryan Fuller, who began his career on Star Trek: Deep Space Nine, has stated that Brannon Braga, Voyager's co-executive producer, considered making Sarah Silverman a member of the crew on the basis of her acting in this episode. Braga “liked writing for Silverman and the freshness she brought to the Voyager” show plus the possibilities for a Tom Paris romance with her. In the end, Braga abandoned the idea and instead chose Jeri Ryan to join the crew in season 4 of the show.
- The Eugenic Wars that happen between 1992 & 1996 from The Original Series Episode "Space Seed" are not mentioned in this episode.

== See also ==
- "Relativity" – the fifth season episode where Voyager again encounters Captain Braxton (portrayed in that episode by Bruce McGill)
