= Jessica Tuck =

American actress (born 1963)

- Born: February 19, 1963 (age 63); New York City, U.S.
- Education: Yale University
- Occupation: Actress
- Years active: 1988–present
- Spouse: Robert Koseff (m. 2002)
- Children: 1

Jessica Tuck (born February 19, 1963) is an American actress, best known for her performances on television as Megan Gordon Harrison on the ABC soap opera One Life to Live, Gillian Gray in the CBS drama series Judging Amy, and as Nan Flanagan on the HBO series True Blood.

== Personal life ==
Tuck was born in New York City. She graduated from Yale University with a BS in Psychology in 1986. She and her husband, Robert Koseff, have a child, Sam Koseff.

== Career ==
Tuck made her television debut as Megan Gordon Harrison on the ABC daytime soap opera, One Life to Live. She was a regular cast member from 1988 to 1992. She reprised the role in spirit form in 1993, 1999, 2004, and 2012. Tuck was nominated for a Daytime Emmy Award for Outstanding Lead Actress in a Drama Series in 1992 for her role on One Life to Live, but lost the award to her onscreen mother Erika Slezak. In 1990 she also was nominated for a Soap Opera Digest Award for Outstanding Female Newcomer: Daytime for the same role. After leaving daytime television, Tuck played Nicole Brown Simpson in The O.J. Simpson Story (1995) and had a leading role in the Olsen twins' straight-to-video movie Billboard Dad (1998).

From 1999 to 2005, Tuck co-starred opposite Amy Brenneman in the CBS drama series, Judging Amy as Gillian Gray. The series ended after six seasons. She later appeared in a number of films, most notable are Secretary (2002) and Super 8 (2011). She also appeared on High School Musical 2, High School Musical 3 and Sharpay's Fabulous Adventure as Darby Evans, the mother of Ryan (Lucas Grabeel) and Sharpay (Ashley Tisdale). In 2008, Tuck was cast in the HBO series True Blood as Nan Flanagan, a vampire who is the spokesperson and 'face' of vampires for the American Vampire League. In season 4, she was promoted to a series regular. She appeared in the series from 2008 to 2011 and made a guest appearance in 2014, in the final season.

During her career, Tuck has made over 50 guest appearances on television shows, including Murder, She Wrote, Seinfeld, NYPD Blue, The Nanny, CSI: Crime Scene Investigation, Grey's Anatomy, Boston Legal, Castle, Private Practice, Revenge, Drop Dead Diva, and Scandal. Tuck also had the recurring roles on Murder One, Sunset Beach, Saving Grace, Days of Our Lives, Grimm, and Twisted.

In 2001, Tuck founded Spark Off Rose, a storytelling event based in Los Angeles. She currently serves as its executive producer/director.

== Filmography ==
=== Film ===
Year	Title	Role	Notes
1988	Video Girlfriend	Debbie	Short film
1989	Who Shot Pat?	Tish	
1993	Rising Sun	Senator Morton's Aide	
1994	Mr. Write	Nicole Barnes	
1994	Revenge of the Nerds IV: Nerds in Love	Gaylord Medford	
1995	Batman Forever	Female Newscaster	
1997	The Brave Little Toaster to the Rescue	Chris(voice)	
1998	Billboard Dad	Brooke Anders	
1998	The Brave Little Toaster Goes to Mars	Chris(voice)	
1999	Angels, Baby!	Lori	
2001	The Want	Jill	
2002	Secretary	Tricia O'Connor	
2002	Another Life	Woman	Short film
2007	Wild Hogs	Family Mom	
2008	High School Musical 3: Senior Year	Darby Evans	
2010	Public Relations	Stella	
2011	Sharpay's Fabulous Adventure	Darby Evans	
2011	Super 8	Mrs. Kaznyk	
2012	Model Minority	Angie Tanaka	
2014	Dragon Nest: Warriors' Dawn	Nerwin (voice)	
2016	Honeyglue	Janet	
2018	Smallfoot	Additional voices	
2019	Star Wars: The Rise of Skywalker	Additional voices	

=== Television ===
Year	Title	Role	Notes
1988–1993, 1999, 2004, 2012	One Life to Live	Megan Gordon Harrison	Series regular (1988–93)
1991	A Woman Named Jackie	Lorraine Murrey	Episode: "The Bouvier Years"
1992	Home Improvement	Leslie	Episode: "Heavy Meddle"
1992	Flying Blind	Diandra Barash	Episode: "Prelude to a Brisket"
1992	Dream On	Skyler	Episode: "To the Moon, Alex!"
1992	Picket Fences	K.C.	Episode: "The Snake Lady"
1992	Murder, She Wrote	Sally Wilson	Episode: "The Classic Murder"
1993	Lifepod	Claire St. John	Television film
1993	Cutters	Mary Louise	Episode: "Harry's Best Friend"
1993	Dave's World		Episode: "The Great Mandala of Life"
1993	Lois & Clark: The New Adventures of Superman	Toni Taylor	Episode: "I've Got a Crush on You"
1993	The Adventures of Brisco County, Jr	Annie Cavendish	Episode: "Showdown"
1994	Diagnosis: Murder	Susan Levin	Episode: "Reunion with Murder"
1994	Revenge of the Nerds IV: Nerds in Love	Gaylord	Television film
1994	Fortune Hunter	Tricia Chamberlain	Episode: "Millennium"
1995	Seinfeld	Bonnie	Episode: "The Label Maker"
1995	The O. J. Simpson Story	Nicole Brown Simpson	Television film
1995	The George Wendt Show	Tina	Episode: "A Need for Seed"
1995	Murder One	D.D.A. Martine Booth	Episode: "Chapter Eight"
1996	Wing Commander IV: The Price of Freedom	Dr. Brody (voice)	Video game
1996	NYPD Blue	Farrell McLeary	Episode: "Girl Talk"
1996	The Last Frontier	Kate	6 episodes
1996	Murder One	Laura Crimmins	6 episodes
1997	Life's Work	Diane Webster	Episode: "Harassment"
1997	Party of Five	Lori	Episode: "Life's Too Short"
1997	The Advocate's Devil	Jennifer Dawling	Television film
1997	The Visitor	Lawson	Episode: "Remember"
1997	Profit	Carol McKenna / Kelly Hunt	Episode: "Security"
1998	ER	Dr. Hemmings	Episode: "Family Practice"
1998	The Garbage Picking Field Goal Kicking Philadelphia Phenomenon	Marie Gorman	Television film
1998	A Wing and a Prayer	LaVaughn	Television film
1998	The Nanny	C.C.'s Replacement	Episode: "The Pre-Nup"
1998	Sunset Beach	Diane Wood	15 episodes
1998	The Secret Lives of Men		Episode: "The Long Goodbye"
1999	Cupid	Joanne	Episode: "Bachelorette Party"
1999	Millennium	Alice Severin	Episode: "The Sound of Snow"
1999	Partners	Lucy	TV pilot
1999–2005	Judging Amy	Gillian Gray	Series regular, 138 episodes
2000	The Outer Limits	Linda Andrews	Episode: "Seeds of Destruction"
2004	Strong Medicine	Rachel	Episode: "Omissions"
2005	Mrs. Harris	Wife #1	Television film
2005	Surface	Sylvia Barnett (uncredited)	Episode: "1.1"
2005	Everwood	Bonnie	Episode: "Connect Four"
2006	In Justice	Greta	Episode: "Golden Boy"
2006	CSI: Crime Scene Investigation	Sally West	Episode: "The Unusual Suspect"
2006	Grey's Anatomy	Shannon's Mom	Episode: "Time Has Come Today"
2006	Criminal Minds	Dr. Sarah Harris	Episode: "Sex, Birth, Death"
2007	A Decent Proposal	Tia McLealand	Television film
2007	The Last Day of Summer	Mary Malloy	Television film
2007	High School Musical 2	Mrs. Darby Evans	Television film
2007	Boston Legal	Attorney Sheila Zale	Episode: "Do Tell"
2007	October Road	Caroline Garrett	Episode: "Deck the Howls"
2007	Saving Grace	Paige Hanadarko	Episodes: "Yeehaw, Geepaw", "Taco, Tulips, Duck and Spices"
2008	Rules of Engagement	Mrs. Westlin	Episode: "Buyer's Remorse"
2008–11, 2014	True Blood	Nan Flanagan	Series regular, 22 episodes
2009	Big Love	Patty O'Hare	Episode: "Block Party"
2009	Ghost Whisperer	Marlene Hathaway	Episode: "Body of Water"
2009	Cold Case	Charlotte Butler	Episode: "The Long Blue Line", "Into the Blue"
2009	FlashForward	Agent Levy	Episode: "Believe"
2009–10	Saving Grace	Paige Hanadarko	5 episodes
2010	FlashForward	Agent Levy	Episode: "Revelation Zero (Part 1)"
2010	Twentysixmiles	Keri Kincaid	6 episodes
2010	Rex Is Not Your Lawyer	Senator Elizabeth Craig	Episode: "Pilot"
2010	In Plain Sight	Cindy Anderson	Episode: "WitSec Stepmother"
2010	Lie to Me	Deputy Warden Lamb	Episode: "Delinquent"
2010	Days of Our Lives	Madeline Peterson Woods	25 episodes
2010	The Defenders	Susan Harper	Episode: "Nevada v. Sen. Harper"
2010	Men of a Certain Age	Bonnie	Episode: "If I Could, I Surely Would", "Cold Calls"
2011	Criminal Minds: Suspect Behavior	Amy Wheeler	Episode: "One Shot Kill"
2011	Body of Proof	Alexandra Loeb	Episode: "Hunting Party"
2011	Castle	Joy McHugh	Episode: "Eye of the Beholder"
2011	Private Practice	Rosie Graham	Episode: "If I Hadn't Forgotten..."
2012	Bones	Warden Ianthe Bartzokis	Episode: "The Prisoner in the Pipe"
2012	Breakout Kings	Candice Barrett	Episode: "Ain't Love (50) Grand?"
2012	Grimm	Catherine Schade	4 episodes
2012	Prodigy Bully	Mrs. Collins	Television film
2012	Naughty or Nice	Debbie O'Brien	Television film
2013	Switched at Birth	Merkie	Episode: "The Door to Freedom"
2013	Bad Samaritans	Mrs. Parker	Episode: "Middle School Detention"
2013	Revenge	Allison Stoddard	Episodes: "Identity", "Engagement"
2013	Rizzoli & Isles	Dr. Victoria Nolan	Episode: "No One Mourns the Wicked"
2013–14	Twisted	Gloria Crane	4 episodes
2014	Drop Dead Diva	Kathy Jenkins	Episodes: "Truth & Consequences", "Soulmates?"
2013–14	Hart of Dixie	Dorrie Thibodaux	Episodes: "Family Tradition", "Together Again"
2014	Scandal	Senator Stephanie Vaughn	Episode: "Randy, Red, Superfreak and Julia"
2014	Scorpion	Rebecca (Cabe Gallo's ex-wife)	Episode: "Rogue Element"
2015	The Whispers	First Lady Hailey Winters	Episode: "X Marks the Spot"
2015	Proof	Debra	Episode: "Reborn"
2015	CSI: Cyber	Dr. Giana Luca	Episode: "Hack E.R."
2015	NCIS: New Orleans	Sheila Fontaine	Episode: "Darkest Hour"
2016	The Night Shift	Linda	Episode: "By Dawn's Early Light"
2016	Major Crimes	Mrs. Cushing	Episode: "Family Law"
2016	Diagnosis Delicious	Beverly Beckingham	Television film
2017	Snowfall	Jeanette Miller	Original pilot
2017–19	General Hospital	Cassandra Pierce	Series guest
2018	Disjointed	Ms. Harris	2 episodes
2018	Designated Survivor	Senator Crowl	Episodes: "Target", "Run"
2018	Liza on Demand	Marcia	Episode: "Popular"
2018	Suits	Carrie	Episode: "Revenue Per Square Foot"
2019	Lethal Weapon	Anna Strong	Episode: "There Will Be Bud"
2019	Black-ish	Dr. Cole	Episode: "Wilds of Valley Glen"
2019–2020	Good Trouble	Libby Wilson	3 episodes
2020	The Resident	Becky Copple	Episode: "The Flea"
2020	Little Fires Everywhere	Caroline Ellis	Mini-series
2020	9-1-1	Dr. Royce	Episode: "The One That Got Away"
2020	NCIS	Gloria Caplinger	Episode: "The Arizona"
2020–2023	Upload	Viv	13 episodes
2021	B Positive	Dr. Goodson	Episode: "Open Heart Surgery"
2022	Law & Order	Clara Newhall	Episode: "Fault Lines"
2022–2026	For All Mankind	Christine Francis	14 episodes
2024	Law & Order: Special Victims Unit	Lillian Andrews	Episode: "Excavation"
2026	Matlock	Dixie Carlson	season 2 episode 10 "The Greater Good"
