= Revelation Zero (Part 1) =

- FlashForward episode
- Episode no.: Season 1 Episode 11
- Directed by: John Polson
- Written by: Seth Hoffman & Marc Guggenheim
- Original air date: March 18, 2010

Guest appearances
- Barry Shabaka Henley as Shelly Vreede; Paula Newsome as Callie Langer; Lindsay Crouse as Nicole's Mother; Gil Bellows as Timothy Cooke; Ricky Jay as Ted Flosso; Neil Jackson as Lucas Hellinger; John Prosky as Mr. Dunkirk; Ginifer King as Paige Kirby; Marc Menchaca as Wheeler; Karl Herlinger as Quarny; Omid Abtahi as Ed Fiore; Jessica Tuck as Mrs. Levy; Seana Kofoed as Charlene Collins; Michael Ealy as Marshall Vogel; Cynthia Addai-Robinson as Debbie; Amy Rosoff as Marcie Turoff; Jonathan Levit as Martin Dewey; Ryan Wynott as Dylan Simcoe

Episode chronology
← Previous "A561984"	Next → "Revelation Zero (Part 2)"

"Revelation Zero (Part 1)" is the eleventh episode of the American television series FlashForward. The episode's teleplay was written by Seth Hoffman, Marc Guggenheim and was directed by John Polson. Originally aired in the United States on ABC on March 18, 2010, along with the second half of the episode, Revelation Zero (Part 2).

== Plot ==
=== The Day of the Blackout ===
A man named Timothy, a window washer in L.A., is about to go down a window washing elevator from the roof of a tall office building when the blackout happens. He accidentally hits the lever down as he falls down, but his weight makes the elevator tip off to the side causing him to slide off the elevator. As he falls, his hook, which is in the hands of his unconscious partner, slips out of his hands and starts slipping off the building until it hooks back onto the elevator, saving Timothy from falling to his death.

=== The Present ===
Mark and Demetri return from Hong Kong, and Wedeck starts interrogating Mark about the events that happened, while Janis and Vreede interrogate Olivia, who's recently witnessed the abduction of Lloyd Simcoe at the hospital by two EMTs' who go over the names of Wheeler and Quarny. Meanwhile, Wedeck tells Mark that he'll be doing some therapy with psychiatrist, Callie Langer, until she can determine whether or not if Mark's stable to come back after his three weeks of suspension. Just as Mark's about to leave, he quickly takes photos of everything on his board before he leaves, and then bumps into Simon, who's watching the security footage from the hospital. Mark watches a little bit of it, showing Quarny slapping Olivia across the face. Olivia and Mark rejoice, but the reconcile is ruined when Mark sees Olivia hugging Lloyd on the footage. Mark ignores it and the couple head on home. Later, Wedeck takes Demetri into the meeting room, where Marshall Vogel, an agent of the CIA, is waiting there, who Demetri met back in Hong Kong when Mark tried to abduct a lady who had information on Demetri's death in the future.

Turns out, he's now joined the "Mosaic Task Force". Simon is in the room with them, because he's known Lloyd Simcoe since they started on the "Proton-Driven Plasma Wakefield Acceleration Project", which is believed to be the cause of the blackout. Simon believes that if they check Lloyd's laptop to see if he's talked with anyone on there, they could possibly find a lead on where to find him. Simon and Janis head over to Lloyd's house to check it out, when Janis and Simon get attacked by two masked men, the same men who Mark claimed to have seen in his vision. They knock out Janis while they kidnap Simon. The next day, they trace all the 911 Emergency calls, and one of them was called from a train station. Demetri and Marshall go check it out, and find the bodies of the real ambulance drivers in one of the abandoned train compartments. After identifying the dead bodies, they decide to trace one of the guys cell phones, believing it could help them find the ambulance vehicle, which would lead them to where Lloyd and possibly Simon are at.

=== Interrogation ===
Lloyd wakes up, recently after he's been abducted, in a basement where he is greeted by Lucas Hellinger, who unlocks his handcuffs and gives him some water, and tells him that if he answers some questions, his boss will let him go, which Lloyd doesn't agree to do. The next day, Lloyd wakes up when he hears his abductors throw someone down the stairs, who turns out to be Simon. Lloyd finds a menu to the "Crown Cheese Steak" in the basement, and with the blood from his wounds, writes "HELP US" on it, and holds it outside the window so someone could see it, but it gets blown away. They're then confronted by Flosso (who was previously seen in The Gift where he killed a guy for not bringing back all seven rings of some sort). Flosso asks Lloyd how many electron volts were generated during their experiment. Lloyd doesn't give him the answer because he doesn't want him to cause another blackout. Flosso explains to Lloyd that he and Simon didn't cause the blackout, but their experiment amplified it. Flosso then returns with Lloyd's "Help Us" sign and has Quarny and Wheeler take Simon away to be tortured. When they return, Flosso gives Lloyd another chance, and when he refuses, Flosso has Quarny cut off Simon's pinky.

=== Mark and Olivia ===
Mark goes to his first session with Callie Langer, and after revealing to her that he was drunk in his vision, she says that there's a drug that she gives to patients that can enhance some parts of people's visions that they can't remember. She gives it to Mark, and he dreams of something from his vision. He sees more stuff, such as Lloyd's Crown Cheese Steak "Help Us" Menu, and a "Red Panda" Logo. Then, he was talking with Lloyd Simcoe on a cellphone, possibly both of them working with each other, Lloyd talking about getting close to cracking up a Q.E.D., and Mark basing their work from the tellings of "D. Gibbons", who Lloyd tells Mark that he's always been a liar. Mark tells Lloyd that unless they can stop what they're trying to prevent, there's gonna be another blackout. Mark tells his best friend, Aaron Stark, about what he saw and returns to tell Wedeck what he saw. Wedeck tells him to keep his mouth shut about it, otherwise they'll look bad. Mark then goes to question Red Panda Industries, an industry where they provide help (education, water, food, etc.) around the world, including Somalia.

Meanwhile, Olivia tries to stop the hospital chief Mr. Dunkirk about not transferring Dylan, Lloyd's son, away. Olivia then checks up on Dylan and cheers him up, telling the chief that he could be sick. That night, Dylan gives Olivia a cookie from his dinner and she sings him good night.

=== Sanctuary ===
Nicole's mother, who is mentally ill, tries to burn the bible, but Nicole puts the fire out before she can kill herself. Nicole leaves her mother with her sister Paige, and goes to the hospital, where she sees a staff member who she believes to be the man who kills her in her vision. She tries to stop him, but he disappears. She tells Olivia, Bryce and another nurse about it, and Olivia promises that she'll alert security. The nurse, who knows that Nicole is worried and scared, tells her to go to a meeting called "Sanctuary", where a man explains to people how the flashforwards were a good thing. Nicole goes to the meeting, where it turns out that the speaker is Timothy, the window washer seen at the beginning of the episode. After the meeting, Nicole asks him about their rules to God, since she believes He caused the blackout. Timothy then tells her that if she would like to discuss it, they should meet the next morning for some coffee. Nicole agrees to do so.

== Title sequence image ==
A Bible after Nicole's mother sets it on fire.

== Reception ==
=== Viewership ===
The first half of the two-hour episode was watched by 6.61 million American viewers.

=== Reviews ===
IGN gave the episode an 8.4 out of 10. Entertainment Weekly pointed out how well they recognize the philosophical and spiritual thematic possibilities within their sci-fi premise and that they actually have characters talk about said themes. The A.V. Club gave this episode a B−, stating that "Monaghan's Simon was probably the show's most useless character before tonight."
