= Bruce MacVittie =

American actor (1956–2022)

- Born: Bruce James MacVittie; October 14, 1956; Providence, Rhode Island, U.S.
- Died: May 7, 2022 (aged 65); New York City, New York, U.S.
- Occupation: Actor
- Years active: 1980–2022
- Spouse: Carol Ochs (m. 1997; his death 2022)

Bruce James MacVittie (October 14, 1956 – May 7, 2022) was an American actor. He was known for playing Danny Scalercio in the fourth season of The Sopranos, Mickey Mack in Million Dollar Baby, and Detective Eastman in Lonely Hearts.

== Early life ==
MacVittie was born in Providence, Rhode Island, on October 14, 1956.

== Career ==
MacVittie made guest appearances on television shows, including Miami Vice, The Equalizer, L.A. Law, Law & Order, Homicide: Life on the Street, Sex and the City, Oz, The Unit, Numbers, Blue Bloods and Chicago Med.

In 2002, MacVittie appeared as Danny Scalerio in the HBO drama television series The Sopranos for its fourth season. He appeared as Mickey Mack in the 2004 Academy Award-winning sports drama film Million Dollar Baby, featuring Clint Eastwood, Hilary Swank and Morgan Freeman.

== Personal life ==
In 1997, MacVittie was married to Carol Ochs until his death 25 years later in 2022.

=== Death ===
MacVittie died on May 7, 2022, in New York City. He was 65. In an interview, Al Pacino said, "His performances were always glistening and crackling; a heart and a joy to watch. He was the embodiment of the struggling actor in New York City, and he made it work."

== Filmography ==
=== Film ===
| Year | Title | Role | Notes |
|---|---|---|---|
| 1981 | The Chosen | Bully | |
| 1984 | The Cotton Club | Vince Hood | |
| 1988 | Vibes | Tony | |
| 1989 | The January Man | Rip | |
| 1989 | Born on the Fourth of July | Patient #2 | |
| 1991 | Queens Logic | Joey Clams' Nephew | |
| 1991 | He Said, She Said | Lou the Florist | |
| 1991 | The Doors | UCLA Student | |
| 1991 | Deceived | Social Security Man | |
| 1995 | Stonewall | Vinnie | |
| 1997 | The Peacemaker | DOE Helo Tech | |
| 1998 | 54 | Music Producer | |
| 1998 | Hi-Life | Cluck | |
| 2000 | Where the Money Is | Karl | |
| 2001 | Hannibal | FBI Tech with Lecter's Letter | |
| 2003 | Happy End | Benito | |
| 2004 | Million Dollar Baby | Mickey Mack | |
| 2006 | Lonely Hearts | Detective Eastman | |
| 2006 | Bernard and Doris | Doctor | |
| 2006 | Just Like the Son | Bill | |
| 2009 | Brooklyn's Finest | Father Scarpitta | Credited as Bruce Macvittie |
| 2013 | Ass Backwards | Club Owner | |
| 2019 | The Last Full Measure | Senator Martin Clayborne | |
| 2022 | Call Jane | Director Richardson | |
| 2022 | The Good Nurse | Malcolm Burrel | |

=== Television ===
| Year | Title | Role | Notes |
|---|---|---|---|
| 1981 | Barney Miller | Gerald Clayton | Episode: "The Rainmaker" |
| 1985 | Miami Vice | Officer David Blakeney | Episode: "Whatever Works" |
| 1985 | The Equalizer | Officer Frank Sergi | Episode: "Lady Cop" |
| 1985 | Spenser for Hire | Ronny Horgan | Episode: "Internal Affairs" |
| 1990 | Night Visions | Starks | Television film |
| 1991–2006 | Law & Order | Various | 7 episodes |
| 1993 | L.A. Law | Andrew Varney | Episode: "Bourbon Cowboy" |
| 1994 | The Stand | Ace-High | 2 episodes |
| 1994 | New York Undercover | Miles Jordan | Episode: "Mate" |
| 1997 | Homicide: Life on the Street | Larry Biedron | Episode: "The Subway" |
| 1998 | Sex and the City | Allan Miller | Episode: "The Man, the Myth, the Viagra" |
| 1999 | Oz | Strauch | Episode: "Unnatural Disasters" |
| 2002 | The Sopranos | Danny Scalercio | 5 episodes |
| 2006 | The Unit | Mark Harris | Episode: "Unannounced" |
| 2006 | CSI:NY | Det. Grant Lafferty | Episode: "Run Silent, Run Deep" |
| 2007 | The Black Donnellys | Lambert | 2 episodes |
| 2007 | Numbers | Congressman Randal Amato | Episode: "The Art of Reckoning" |
| 2007 | Army Wives | Dr. Hirsch | Episode: "After Birth" |
| 2011 | Body of Proof | Mr. Swanson | Episode: "Pilot" |
| 2011 | Person of Interest | Defense Attorney | Episode: "Pilot" |
| 2018 | Blue Bloods | Lee McByrne | Episode: "Second Chances" |
| 2018 | Chicago Med | Vic Thomas | Episode: "Born This Way" |
| 2019 | When They See Us | Detective Hartigan | Episode: "Part One" |
| 2022 | Bull | Ruben Ware | Episode: "Safe Space" |

=== Video games ===
| Year | Title | Role | Notes |
|---|---|---|---|
| 2004 | Red Dead Revolver | Cowboy, Holstein Hal, Guard | |
| 2010 | Red Dead Redemption | Clyde Evans | Credited as Bruce MacVitte |
| 2013 | Grand Theft Auto V | The Local Population | |
