= Letting Go (Body of Proof) =

- Body of Proof episode
- Episode no.: Season 1 Episode 2
- Directed by: Nelson McCormick
- Written by: Matthew Gross; Christopher Murphey
- Production code: 102
- Original air date: April 3, 2011

Guest appearances
- Barry Shabaka Henley as Al Chapman; Brian White as Brian Hall; Sherri Saum as Nina Wheeler; Brenda Pressley as Laura Chapman; Chance Kelly as Gary Miller; Alexander Cendese as Eric Singleton; Johnny Hopkins as Lonny Reed; Zakiya Cook as Linda Chapman; Steven Demarco as Dave Piaseki

Episode chronology
← Previous "Pilot"	Next → "Helping Hand"
- Body of Proof (season 1)

"Letting Go" is the second episode of the first season of the American medical drama Body of Proof. It was originally broadcast in the United States on ABC on April 3, 2011. The episode was directed by Nelson McCormick and written by Matthew Gross and series creator Christopher Murphey.

In this episode, Megan Hunt (Dana Delany) and Detectives Bud Morris (John Carroll Lynch) and Samantha Baker (Sonja Sohn) inspect the case of an interracial couple who are shot dead in their car at Fairmount Park. This case leads them to many suspects, including one of the victim's parents, Al (Barry Shabaka Henley) and Laura Chapman (Brenda Pressley), both who seem to be hiding secrets about the couple's relationship.

The episode received positive reviews, and was watched by 8.49 million viewers, according to Nielsen ratings, on the Sunday night it aired in the United States. Critics pointed out Curtis Brumfield (Windell Middlebrooks) as giving "some of the best lines of the night" and providing some "much needed comic relief". Although this episode received positive reviews, it received significantly lower ratings than both the previous and the subsequent episodes, most likely due to the episode moving from the normal Tuesday timeslot to a Sunday night.

== Plot ==
Dave Piaseki (Steven Demarco) and Linda Chapman (Zakiya Cook) are found shot dead in their car at Fairmount Park. When Megan Hunt (Dana Delany) and detectives Bud Morris (John Carroll Lynch) and Samantha Baker (Sonja Sohn) arrive, they think the case is a Murder–suicide, but Megan finds two bullets in Dave and concludes that someone murdered them. Megan meets Linda's parents, Al (Barry Shabaka Henley) and Laura (Brenda Pressley), and tells them the news, leaving them devastated. Megan links Linda's ex-boyfriend Brian Hall (Brian White) to Dave and finds out that Dave was at Brian's restaurant the night he died. However, Brian has an alibi as he was with employee Nina Wheeler (Sherri Saum). The police find out that Linda used to work at Brian's restaurant and received psychological abuse until Dave found out and confronted him. Brian has started to abuse Nina, so the police get Nina away from Brian, as he caused Linda to suffer from bulimia due to the abuse.

Ethan Gross (Geoffrey Arend) and Curtis Brumfield (Windell Middlebrooks) find out that Dave was planning on marrying Linda; however, as the two were an interracial couple, they gained an enemy in Eric Singleton (Alexander Cendese), who stole the engagement ring out of the couple’s car, but after they were dead. Megan later finds residue in Linda's eyes to suggest that the killer closed her eyes after she died, which leads them back to Linda's parents, who knew that Dave intended to propose. When they call the two into the office, Al admits he killed Dave and Linda. He had only wanted to scare them so they would not marry; however, the gun discharged, killing Linda, and in panic, he killed Dave too. After apologizing to Laura, Al is taken away. Throughout the day, Megan tries to reconnect with her daughter Lacey (Mary Mouser); however, her attempts to create a better relationship with her backfire.

== Production ==
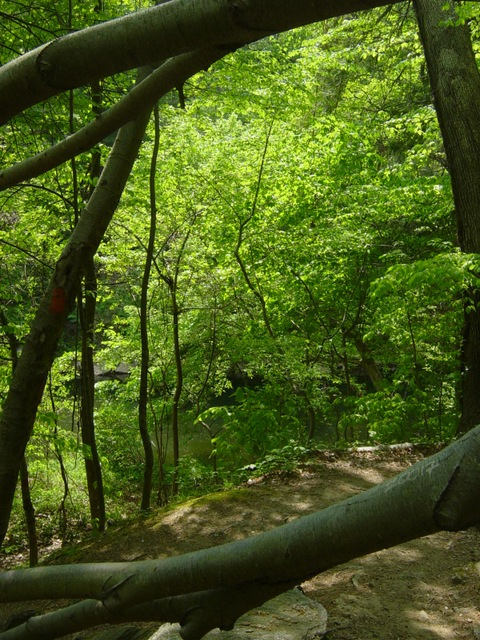
The murder scene of the couple in this episode was set at Fairmount Park (pictured)

"Letting Go" was written by series creator Christopher Murphey and Matthew Gross, who is best known for directing episodes of Dirty Sexy Money and Day Break, and films such as Fired Up! and Joe Somebody. Gross later directed the fifth episode of season 1, "Dead Man Walking", alongside Murphey. It was directed by Nelson McCormick making it the second episode in a row in which he was the director; he also directed the previous episode "Pilot". Daniel Licht, who has worked on the series since its inception, returned to compose the music for the episode. Actor Barry Shabaka Henley guest starred in the episode as Al Chapman and Brian J. White appeared as Brian Hall. Sherri Saum – best known for her roles in Sunset Beach and One Life to Live – also guest starred, playing Nina Wheeler. Mary Mouser – best known for her role in Life Is Wild – made another re-appearance as Lacey Fleming, Megan's daughter. The show was moved to a Sunday from the normal timeslot of Tuesday before Body of Proof's pilot episode had aired. In a press statement, ABC said, "The second episode of new drama Body Of Proof will air on a special night and time, SUNDAY, APRIL 3 (10:01-11:00 p.m., ET), following an original episode of Desperate Housewives".

"Letting Go", along with the eight episodes from Body of Proof's first season, were released on a two-disc DVD set in the United States on September 20, 2011. The sets included brief audio commentaries from various crew and cast members for several episodes, a preview of season 2, a 10-minute "featurette" on the making of the show with commentaries from the medical consultants who helped with the script, and a "Contaminated Evidence" blooper reel.

== Reception ==
=== Ratings ===
Finally using their bigger shows to boost the newbies, ABC is scheduled to air the second episode of the Dana Delany procedural Body of Proof after a new episode of Desperate Housewives on April 3. The alphabet has sometimes been a little hesitant to rock the boat with their scheduling, but it seems that they're finally using their assets wisely, so this move could help solidify Body of Proof into the next channel mainstay.

— Shilo Adams,
TV OverMind

In its original American broadcast on 3 April 2011, "Letting Go" was seen by 8.49 million viewers, according to Nielsen ratings. Among viewers between ages 18 and 49, it received a 2.0 rating/9 share. This means that it was seen by 2 percent of all 18- to 49-year-olds, and 9 percent of all 18- to 49-year-olds watching television at the time of the broadcast. This episode achieved a much lower number of viewers than the previous episode, "Pilot", as well as the subsequent episode, "Helping Hand". However, the lower ratings than both "Pilot" and "Helping Hand" were likely due to the move from the normal Tuesday timeslot to a Sunday night. Body of Proof came sixth in the ratings on Sunday night; it was outperformed by the ABC's Desperate Housewives and Secret Millionaire, CBS's 60 Minutes and airing of the ACM Awards, and NBC's Celebrity Apprentice. "Helping Hand" was watched by 1.69 million viewers upon its airing on Channel 5 in the United Kingdom.

=== Critical response ===
The episode received positive reviews. Christine Orlando from TV Fanatic stated that this episode gave her "hope for this procedural that the pilot didn't". She called the storyline "heartbreaking", "sad", shocking", and "chilling" and added that there were "plenty of twists and turns that kept me guessing throughout the hour". She was upset that Al Chapman was the murderer, saying that it would have been "wonderful to see Brian, Linda's bad tempered, control freak of an ex hauled away in cuffs". She added that the look that Eric Singleton gave Detective Baker was "positively evil". She praised the interaction between the Megan and the rest of the main cast, saying, "We got to know more about the cast of characters in Megan's office and Curtis was the standout. Last week Megan questioned Curtis' abilities as a doctor. This week, Curtis not only proved her wrong but turned out to be the much needed comic relief delivering some of the best lines of the night". She finished, ""Letting Go" definitely left me looking forward to what this new hit show has in store for us next". After the ratings for "Pilot" were high, Matt Roush of TV Guide hoped that Body of Proof would "continue to improve" adding that he preferred this episode to "Pilot", despite the lower ratings.
