= The Art of Reckoning (Numbers) =

- Numbers episode
- Episode no.: Season 3 Episode 21
- Directed by: John Behring
- Written by: Julie Hébert
- Original air date: April 27, 2007

Guest appearances
- Rosa Evangelina Arredondo as Rene Moreno; Preston Bailey as Randy Amato; Rhyon Nicole Brown as Lucy Fuñez Moreno; Franco Delgado as Prisoner #2; Eddie Driscoll as Guard #1; Wood Harris as Murphy 'Pony' Fuñez; Bruce MacVittie as Congressman Randal Amato; Joe Marinelli as Phillip Berelli; Kathy Najimy as Dr. Millie Finch; Lina Patel as Stephanie Quartz; Jeremy Sisto as AUSA Alvin Brickle; Curtis 'Spider Loc' Williams as Prisoner #3; Shane Woodson as Guard #3; Matthew Yang King as Technician

Episode chronology
← Previous "Burn Rate"	Next → "Under Pressure"
- Numbers season 3

"The Art of Reckoning" is the 21st episode of the third season of the American television show Numbers. In the episode, Federal Bureau of Investigation (FBI) agents investigate the confessions of a mob hit man before his execution. Written by Julie Hébert, the episode also highlighted the return of series regular Peter MacNicol as his character, Dr. Larry Fleinhardt, returned from space.

"The Art of Reckoning" first aired in the United States on April 27, 2007. Critics gave the episode positive reviews. The episode was also a favorite for lead actor David Krumholtz.

== Plot summary ==
Drs. Charlie Eppes (David Krumholtz) and Amita Ramanujan (Navi Rawat), Charlie's girlfriend and colleague, watch the space shuttle carrying their friend and colleague Dr. Larry Fleinhardt (Peter MacNicol) from the International Space Station land at Edwards Air Force Base in California. Meanwhile, FBI Special Agent Don Eppes (Rob Morrow), Charlie's brother, accompanies Assistant United States Attorney Alvin Brickle (Jeremy Sisto) to a California prison to visit death row inmate Pony Fuñez (Wood Harris), who is scheduled to be executed within the week. Fuñez, a former mob hit man, claims that he could lead Don and Brickle to the body of a mobster and can tell Don what happened to Senator Randall Amato (Bruce MacVittie)'s son (Preston Bailey), who disappeared in 1997. FBI Special Agents David Sinclair (Alimi Ballard) and Colby Granger (Dylan Bruno) find the mobster's body exactly as Fuñez described, proving Fuñez' legitimacy and his claim to having an eidetic memory.

To obtain information about Senator Amato's son, Charlie, at the FBI office trying to reach Larry at Edwards Air Force Base, suggests using tit-for-tat to exchange information with Fuñez. Reluctantly, Don transfers Fuñez to the FBI office for questioning. David, in the meantime, goes to Fuñez’s house to talk to Rene Moreno (Rosa Evangelina Arredondo), Fuñez’s wife, and discovers that Lucy Fuñez (Rhyon Nicole Brown), Fuñez’s daughter, wants to see her father before his execution. Back at the office, Don lets Fuñez see the picture of Lucy that Rene gave David. Fuñez offers the location of the body of Senator Amato’s son. He also describes the death of the boy and the weather conditions for the night in question. This time, the team finds the body of a mob leader, and Don refuses to cooperate with the hit man. At Charlie's house, Don finds Charlie and their father, Alan Eppes (Judd Hirsch), barbecuing to celebrate Larry's return. Don informs Charlie of the situation, and Charlie suggests cooperating when Fuñez refuses to, tit-for-two-tats, in hopes of Fuñez cooperating again. The team determines that a living mob leader killed the dead leader to gain control of the mob. A polygraph test ordered by Senator Amato demonstrates that Fuñez is telling the truth about the death of the senator’s son.

Meanwhile, Larry surprises Charlie by showing up at CalSci to see Charlie and although mistakenly calls the knotted cords "Aztec" Quipu, he explains the meaning. Larry invites Charlie to the beach where Larry had been staying since his return to Earth. There, Charlie learns that Larry is experiencing space transcendence and does not want to lose that feeling. Charlie and Larry return to the FBI office, where Larry is greeted by Don. They heard Fuñez's confession about Senator Amato's son, and Larry realizes that Fuñez has confabulated his memories of the night the boy was killed. Charlie and Don use fMRI to determine the truth about Fuñez's memories. The fMRI seems to confirm the polygraph test. When Charlie confronts Fuñez with contradictory weather conditions for the night in question, Fuñez tells Don that the mob leader killed Senator Amato's son. Fuñez's description confirms Colby's earlier suspicion that Fuñez could not bring himself to kill a child. An FBI team finds the child's body right where Fuñez said it was. Meanwhile, David and Brickle, en route to Fuñez's house to talk to Rene, engage in a shootout with a couple of members of the mob. As a result of Fuñez's cooperation, Don personally brings Lucy to the FBI office to see her father before his execution. After enjoying an al fresco dinner with Alan and Charlie at the house, Larry informs Charlie that he will be staying at the Buddhist temple in Altadena, California, for a spiritual retreat.

== Production ==
=== Casting notes ===
Wood Harris, formerly on The Wire, and Jeremy Sisto, of Kidnapped, guest-starred in "The Art of Reckoning".

It also marked the final appearance of season three for Kathy Najimy's character, Dr. Millie Finch. Although scheduled to appear in two to three episodes, Najimy's role was expanded to cover series regular Peter MacNicol's departure to film 24.

=== Writing ===
"The Art of Reckoning" marked series regular Peter MacNicol's return to Numb3rs after wrapping up "24". During the filming of season three, writers and producers learned that MacNicol would return to Numb3rs. Writers then wrote a story which explored Larry's new attitude since his mission. According to creator and executive producer Cheryl Heuton, producers were uncertain as to the date of MacNicol's return, but, as of an interview with TVGuide.com's Michael Ausiello, they already developed a few story ideas to write Larry back into the script. Shortly after MacNicol's return to the series, he became a regular again.

== Reception ==
Over 10.15 million people watched "The Art of Reckoning". Cynthia Boris of DVD Verdict calls the episode "well plotted, engaging". The episode also was a favorite episode for actor David Krumholtz as it highlighted some of Larry’s inner struggles.
