= Hunting Party (Body of Proof) =

- Body of Proof episode
- Episode no.: Season 2 Episode 2
- Directed by: Paul Holahan
- Written by: Christopher Murphey
- Production code: 202
- Original air date: September 27, 2011

Guest appearances
- Jay Karnes as Martin Loeb; Jessica Tuck as Alexandra Loeb; Alex Fernandez as Alan Wright; Natalie Floyd as Erika Loeb; Isabella Grace as Julie Loeb; Joey Adams as Thomas Loeb; Adrian Alvarado as Detective Dave Lopez; Ransford Doherty as Detective Tim Bell; Brad Standley as Patrick Deline; Michael Dean Connolly as Steve Turtell; Michael J. Sielaff as Larry; Richard Cabral as Jorge; Lisa Gershuny as Francine; Kathyjean Harris as Theresa; Jenn Korbee as Bethany; Jodie Brunelle as Young Joan Hunt; Amy Vorphal as CSU Tech

Episode chronology
← Previous "Love Thy Neighbor"	Next → "Missing"
- Body of Proof (season 2)

"Hunting Party" is the second episode of the second season of the American medical drama Body of Proof. It was originally broadcast in the United States on ABC on September 27, 2011. The episode was directed by Paul Holahan and written by series creator Christopher Murphey.

The episode follows Megan Hunt (Dana Delany), a former neurosurgeon turned medical examiner at Philadelphia, who investigates the murder of Julie Loeb (Isabella Grace), who is shot during a hunting expedition. Accompanied by Peter Dunlop (Nicholas Bishop), Bud Morris (John Carroll Lynch) and Samantha Baker (Sonja Sohn), they question Julie's family, until Megan is forced to leave the case. Megan begins to investigate the death of Patrick Deline (Brad Standley), leading her directly back to her former case of Julie's death.

The episode received positive reviews, and was watched by 9.19 million viewers, according to Nielsen ratings, on the Tuesday night it aired in the United States. Critics praised the storyline, calling it "genuinely surprising", with the plot having a "merry go round of suspects". They also praised Megan's dialogue with Peter and the "cute" scenes with Lacey Fleming (Mary Mouser).

== Plot ==
Julie Loeb (Isabella Grace) is found shot dead during a hunting expedition in the woods. Megan Hunt (Dana Delany) and Peter Dunlop (Nicholas Bishop), begin to examine Julie. Megan notices a scratch on Julie's husband Martin (Jay Karnes) beginning to suspect he is her killer. After interviewing Martin, her step children Thomas (Joey Adams) and Erika (Natalie Floyd), their financial manager Alan Wright (Alex Fernandez), and Martin's ex-wife Alexandra (Jessica Tuck), she accuses Martin of the murder. Kate Murphy (Jeri Ryan) tells Megan that Martin has phoned the mayor, and made a complaint about Megan's behaviour who accused him of Julie's death. Megan is taken off the case, but gets Ethan Gross (Geoffrey Arend) to test a tissue found on the scene. Kate defends her actions to Peter, stating that she did not take her off the case due to her grudge with Megan, as she is dating Megan's ex-husband Todd Fleming (Jeffrey Nordling). (Note: Although Jeffrey Nordling was credited as appearing, by Radio Times, he did not appear.) Meanwhile, Curtis Brumfield (Windell Middlebrooks) interviews people to become a driver; a person who carries the bodies from the crime scene to the autopsy, and is ultimately unsuccessful. Bud Morris (John Carroll Lynch) and Samantha Baker (Sonja Sohn) interview Martin once again, but are interrupted by Megan, who gets back the results from the scratch, once again accusing Martin of fighting with Julie, which he denies, as his blood matched some which was on her fingernail. Kate issues a final warning to Megan, so Megan takes another case. Bud and Samantha interview Alan, and find out that Julie was pregnant when she was shot.

Meanwhile, Megan spends time with her daughter Lacey (Mary Mouser), who is upset about having Kate in her father's life. Megan comforts her, and Lacey reassures Megan that Kate will not replace her. Megan visits the new crime scene, investigating why Patrick Deline (Brad Standley), is found dead. On the other case, it is revealed that Martin is not the father of Julie's child, but after much evidence is checked, it is in fact Patrick, the person who was killed in Megan's case. Julie had asked his old school friend Patrick to be the father of her child, as she wanted someone that she knew. Her request made both Patrick his partner, Steve Turtell (Michael Dean Connolly) cry. The couple and Julie had not told Martin, as Martin divorced ex-wife Alexandra after Patrick introduced Julie to Martin, when he was decorating the Loeb's house. It is revealed that Alan, the financial director, killed both Patrick and Julie. Alan kept stealing from Martin, and was found out by Patrick, so he beat him to death. Julie also found out, so he panicked, and shot her. Alan begs for forgiveness towards Martin, who in anger, shoots Alan, in front of Bud and Samantha and is consequently arrested, whilst Alan dies.

== Production ==
"Hunting Party" was written by series creator Christopher Murphey and directed by Paul Holahan. Holahan is best known for directing episodes of Ugly Betty, White Collar and Shark, the latter starred Jeri Ryan, who plays Kate Murphy on Body of Proof. Daniel Licht who has worked on the series since its inception, returned to compose the music for the episode. Actor Jay Karnes (known for his role in The Shield) guest starred in the episode as Martin Loeb. Jessica Tuck appeared as Alexandra Loeb and Alex Fernandez starred as Alan Wright, the episodes murderer. This episode marked the second, and final, appearance of Jenn Korbee, who played Bethany, the girlfriend of Peter (Bishop). She made her first appearance in the previous episode, "Love Thy Neighbor". This also marked the first appearances of Adrian Alvarado, who plays Detective Dave Lopez and Ransford Doherty, who plays Detective Tim Bell. From this episode, they appear in two more, "Your Number's Up" and "Shades of Blue", and only Doherty appears in "Falling For You".

"Hunting Party", along with the nineteen episode's from Body of Proof's second season, were released on a four-disc DVD set in the United States on September 18, 2012. The sets included brief audio commentaries from various crew and cast members for several episode's, the webisodes entitled "Outbreak", five "featurettes" on the making of the show, detailing on the fashion, bodies and special effects throughout the season, as well as a "Body of Goofs" blooper reel.

== Reception ==
=== Ratings ===
How often have we seen a suspicious rich guy get an investigator thrown off a case because he happens to be a friend of the mayor? Of course, nothing is as it seems and after obligatory twists at the 20- and 40-minute stages, the solution turns out to be genuinely surprising.

— David Brown,
Radio Times

In its original American broadcast on 27 September 2011, "Hunting Party" was seen by 9.19 million viewers, according to Nielsen ratings. Among viewers between ages 18 and 49, it received a 1.8 rating/10 share. This means that it was seen by 1.8 percent of all 18- to 49-year-olds, and 10 percent of all 18- to 49-year-olds watching television at the time of the broadcast. This episode achieved a much lower number of viewers than the previous episode, "Love Thy Neighbour", as well as the subsequent episode, "Missing". Body of Proof came seventh in the ratings on Tuesday night; it was outperformed by two episodes of ABC's Dancing with the Stars, two episodes of CBS's NCIS and Unforgettable and FOX's New Girl. However, it came second in viewers in the timeslot the episode aired, behind Unforgettabe. "Hunting Party" was watched by 1.19 million viewers upon its airing on Channel 5 in the United Kingdom.

=== Critical response ===
This episode received positive reviews. Christine Orlando from TV Fanatic praised the episode saying, "Body of Proof threw just enough curves to keep me guessing this week and provided enough personal interaction between our characters to make me want to tune in for more". She praised the interaction between Megan and Lacey calling their conversation "cute", adding "It's nice to watch Megan make extra time to spend with her daughter". She called the Alan's actions "pathetic" for trying to apologize to Martin for killing his wife saying, "You've got to be kidding!". Orlando added that she did not "see coming" Martin's reaction to the apology; he shot Alan, stating "I could understand the sentiment". She praised the interaction between Megan and Peter, highlighting their conversation over Peter's girlfriend. Orlando said that she could not understand Megan's facial expressions to Peter's girlfriend, whether it was one of jealousy or tease. She said, "Megan was certainly giving Peter a lot of ribbing about his new girlfriend. Was Megan just having fun with him or did it bother her a little? I couldn't quite tell". She finished in saying, "A "Hunting Party" led to a tragic death and a merry go round of suspects on Body of Proof this week".
