= Missing (Body of Proof) =

- Body of Proof episode
- Episode no.: Season 2 Episode 3
- Directed by: Eric Laneuville
- Written by: Matthew V. Lewis
- Production code: 203
- Original air date: October 4, 2011

Guest appearances
- Joanna Cassidy as Joan Hunt; Cliff Curtis as Special Agent Derek Ames; Stephen Barker Turner as Tom Parker; Keira Naughton as Jennifer Parker; Slaine as Kevin Roban; Nicole Callender as Helen Marti

Episode chronology
| ← Previous "Hunting Party" | Next → "Lazarus Man" |
- Body of Proof (season 2)

"Missing" is the third episode of the second season of the American medical drama Body of Proof. It was originally broadcast in the United States on ABC on October 4, 2011. The episode was directed by Eric Laneuville and written by Matthew V. Lewis.

Following Megan Hunt (Dana Delany), a former neurosurgeon turned medical examiner at Philadelphia, in this episode, Helen Martin (Nicole Callender) is run over by a speeding truck whilst trying to stop the kidnapping of Noah Parker (Anthony Pierini). With the help of FBI agent Derek Ames (Cliff Curtis), Detective Bud Morris (John Carroll Lynch) tries to find the culprits of the kidnapping before the child dies. Meanwhile, Megan has to relive the death of her father, when her mother Joan (Joanna Cassidy) visits.

The episode received positive reviews, and was watched by 9.95 million viewers, according to Nielsen ratings, on the Tuesday night it aired in the United States. Critics praised the scenes which involved Bud, Joan as well as Megan and Derek; "the banter" and "opposites attracting", calling the episode "tense" and saying that it was the "most gripping episode of this season so far". Christine Orlando from TV Fanatic said, "Having been a bit bored with last week's episode, I was glad to see Body of Proof step up its game".

== Plot ==
Helen Martin (Nicole Callender), a nanny, is run over by a speeding truck whilst trying to stop the kidnapping of the six-year-old child she was caring for, Noah Parker (Anthony Pierini). Detective Bud Morris (John Carroll Lynch) is assisted by Special Agent Derek Ames (Cliff Curtis) of the FBI, who takes a call from Noah, but the kidnapper hangs up before the phone can be traced. Bud questions Jason Peterson (Stink Fisher), when his truck matches that of the kidnapping vehicle. Bud turns off the cameras whilst interrogating, and later on, Jason is found dead, which causes Bud's reputation to be questioned, but is later cleared. Megan Hunt (Dana Delany) finds several clues which reveal that Jason knew where Noah is, but the detectives are worried that Noah may die as he is asthmatic and is without his inhaler. Megan's mother Joan (Joanna Cassidy) offers to help with the case, but only to help her re-election as a judge. Joan is using pamphlets, for her campaign, with a picture of Megan at the funeral of her father. Megan dislikes the photo, but Joan likes the picture as it shows "strength and survival". A ransom is made, with the kidnappers wanting one million dollars for the return of Noah. A picture of Noah is sent, with Megan stating that he looks extremely sick. Bud and Derek, with the help of Joan, search many places associated with Jason, despite Bud knowing that Internal Affairs is considering voluntary manslaughter charges against him due to Jason's death.

Curtis Brumfield (Windell Middlebrooks) and Ethan Gross (Geoffrey Arend) begin to believe that Noah is being held by fresh water, so the search is narrowed. Bud is also cleared of voluntary manslaughter, and him, Curtis, Megan and Kate Murphy (Jeri Ryan) suspect that the kidnapping may be an inside job, meaning that someone close to Noah kidnapped him. Bud checks his parents, Tom (Stephen Barker Turner) and Jennifer (Keira Naughton) but they are not the culprits. They then find that Helen's friend, Jason's girlfriend, Rena Talbot (Wrenn Schmidt) looked after Noah whilst Helen was on taking care of her boyfriend Oscar Mendez who had been injured badly in a fight. They find Rena, which results in finding Noah, who is sick but alive, and is reunited with his parents. Whilst Rena is arrested, Derek asks Megan to have a ride on her motorbike, to which she rejects and instead goes to see Joan, having a conversation about her father.

== Production ==
"Missing" was written by Matthew V. Lewis and directed by Eric Laneuville. Laneuville is best known for directing episodes of Ghost Whisperer and is also an actor. Daniel Licht, who has worked on the series since its inception, returned to compose the music for the episode. Actor Stephen Barker Turner and actress Keira Naughton guest starred in the episode as Tom and Jennifer Parker. Stink Fisher appeared as Jason Peterson and Slaine starred as Kevin Roban, a drug dealer. Slaine said of his role in the episode, "As a lot of people know I have branched out from hip-hop to acting and this will be my first venture into network television. I’m really looking forward to working on this, as it’s a great show with a fantastic cast". This episode marked the first appearance of Cliff Curtis, who plays Special Agent Derek Ames, a love interest for Megan Hunt (Delany). Curtis was reported to have a role in Body of Proof in November 2010. Curtis was originally meant to be appearing towards the end of the season. Delany said, "We do have a very dashing FBI agent coming on for the end of the season, played by Cliff Curtis. [Cliff is] an old friend, so I wanted him for the role". Afterwards, Curtis appears in one more episode; "Hard Knocks". "Missing" marked the first appearance of Joanna Cassidy since the first season. Cassidy, who plays Joan Hunt, has appeared in season one episodes, "Society Hill" and "Buried Secrets". Delany said that Megan's relationship with Joan in the second season would be "tough" because it has been "going on for a long time and most people don’t change after a certain age". Regular cast member Mary Mouser who plays Lacey Fleming, did not appear in this episode.

"Missing", along with the nineteen episode's from Body of Proof's second season, were released on a four-disc DVD set in the United States on September 18, 2012. The sets included brief audio commentaries from various crew and cast members for several episode's, the webisodes entitled "Outbreak", five "featurettes" on the making of the show, detailing on the fashion, bodies and special effects throughout the season, as well as a "Body of Goofs" blooper reel.

== Reception ==
The stakes are raised in a way that only slick US crime dramas know how: first, a boy is snatched and his nanny murdered. With the statistic that 75 per cent of kidnapped children are killed within three hours of abduction ringing in their ears, the pressure is on for the cops in the most gripping episode of this season so far.

— David Brown,
Radio Times

=== Ratings ===
In its original American broadcast on 4 October 2011, "Missing" was seen by 9.95 million viewers, according to Nielsen ratings. Among viewers between ages 18 and 49, it received a 2.0 rating/11 share. This means that it was seen by 2.0 per cent of all 18- to 49-year-olds, and 11 per cent of all 18- to 49-year-olds watching television at the time of the broadcast. This episode achieved a significant higher number of viewers than the previous episode, "Hunting Party", as well as the subsequent episode, "Lazarus Man". Body of Proof came fifth in the ratings on Tuesday night; it was outperformed by one episode of ABC's Dancing with the Stars, one episode of CBS's NCIS and Unforgettable and NCIS's spinoff, NCIS: Los Angeles. However, the episode came second in the timeslot it aired in, being beaten b Unforgettable. "Missing" was watched by 1.35 million viewers upon its airing on Channel 5 in the United Kingdom.

=== Critical response ===
The episode received positive reviews. The episode was described as "tense", with Christine Orlando from TV Fanatic, saying that ""Missing" upped the emotional intensity when the autopsies weren't about finding a killer, but about finding a kidnapped little boy". Orlando said that the scenes with Bud were a highlight, as well as the scenes with Megan and Derek. Orlando said, "I enjoyed the banter between Megan and Derek. He's the optimist to her pessimist. When they get the photo of the boy, Derek pointed out that at least he's alive and not alone. Megan said yes, but he's sick and possibly coughing up blood. The amateur nature of the photo gave Derek hope that the kidnapper wasn't a professional. Great, said Megan, that meant he was incompetent and desperate. Was anyone else seeing a case where opposites attract?". She said it was a "pity" that Megan turned Derek down; "Megan could use a bit of a love life and I'm hoping we see more of Agent Ames in the future". She said she was "thankful" that there was not a storyline with Lacey (Mary Mouser), saying that the storyline with Megan and Kate arguing over Lacey had gotten "old", "I'm happy they seem to be moving on". Finishing, she praised the scenes with Megan and Joan and added, "Having been a bit bored with last week's episode, I was glad to see Body of Proof step up its game. The only thing lacking was a bit of the humour I've grown to love".
