= Pilot (Body of Proof) =

- Body of Proof episode
- Episode no.: Season 1 Episode 1
- Directed by: Nelson McCormick
- Written by: Christopher Murphey
- Production code: 101
- Original air date: March 29, 2011

Guest appearances
- Jeffrey Nordling as Todd Fleming; Mary Mouser as Lacey Fleming; Sam Robards as Bradford Paige; Kate Jennings Grant as Jill Paige; Bruce Altman as Dr. Howard Karasunis; Jeremiah Kissel as Dr. Simon Ferrell; Heather Arthur as Angela Swanson; Joseph Sikora as Tom Hanson; Bruce MacVittie as Mr. Swanson; Nancy Villone as Mrs. Swanson; Steven Lee Merkel as Carl Young; Martin Lee as assistant ME No. 1; Molly Schreiber as Assistant ME No. 2; Tyler Peck as Receptionist

Episode chronology
← Previous —	Next → "Letting Go"
- Body of Proof (season 1)

"Pilot" is the pilot episode of the medical drama Body of Proof. It premiered on the ABC network in the United States on March 29, 2011. The episode was directed by Nelson McCormick and written by series creator Christopher Murphey. "Pilot" introduces the lead character of Megan Hunt, a former neurosurgeon turned medical examiner, portrayed by Dana Delany. In the episode, a female jogger is found dead in Schuylkill River and Megan teams up with medical investigator Peter Dunlop (Nicholas Bishop) to investigate her whereabouts before her murder. Meanwhile, Megan spends the day trying to solve a personal problem concerning her daughter's birthday.

"Pilot" was filmed in Providence, Rhode Island during April 2010. The episode achieved 13.942 million viewers upon its first broadcast in the United States, making it the second most watched series premiere of the 2010–11 television season. It also gave UK crime channel Alibi their biggest ever television audience. "Pilot" received mixed reviews from critics, who thought the show seemed bland. However, most critics praised Delany and the supporting cast's performances.

== Plot ==
Megan Hunt (Dana Delany) was once a top neurosurgeon, until she was involved in a car accident leaving her with paresthesia. The condition caused Megan to kill a patient during an operation, thus ending her career. She then became a medical examiner under the supervision of Kate Murphy (Jeri Ryan). Angela Swanson (Heather Arthur) is found dead in the local river, so Peter Dunlop (Nicholas Bishop) calls Megan to investigate. At the crime scene, Peter and Megan meet detectives Bud Morris (John Carroll Lynch) and Samantha Baker (Sonja Sohn), who suspect that her death was accidental. Megan, along with her new colleagues Ethan Gross (Geoffrey Arend) and Curtis Brumfield (Windell Middlebrooks) examine the body at the crime lab. Megan, Bud and Samantha speak with Angela's parents Mr. and Mrs. Swanson (Bruce MacVittie and Nancy Villone) who tell them that they thought she was having a relationship with someone she was working with. Bud and Samantha begin to suspect Angela's ex-boyfriend Tom Hanson (Joe Sikora). He was wrongly convicted of pushing Angela down a flight of stairs during a fight, leaving her in a coma, when it is quickly revealed by Hanson that Angela tripped all by herself, but due to post coma memory loss, she was later unable to back Hanson's story. Megan questions Tom, much to Bud and Samantha's annoyance, where he states she fell down the stairs. Tom is arrested, but later dropped as a suspect.

Megan goes along with Bud and Samantha to question Bradford Paige (Sam Robards), the head of the law firm where Angela worked. Megan's questions anger Bradford and Bud forces her to leave. Megan discovers that Angela gave a client some evidence, which meant that they would win their court case. Megan suspects that Bradford may have found out about this and could have been angry. Megan runs tests on Angela's stomach contents and learns that she had amoxicillin in her system, despite being allergic to it. The police go to Bradford's residence, where Megan reveals that his wife, Jill (Kate Jennings Grant), killed Angela. Jill found out that Bradford and Angela were having an affair and she put some amoxicillin in her drinks bottle. While jogging in the park, Angela suffered an allergic reaction and fell into the river, hitting her head on a piece of debris. Bud and Samantha arrest Jill for Angela's murder. Throughout the day, Megan struggles to buy something for her daughter, Lacey's (Mary Mouser) birthday. After advice from Peter, Megan gets Lacey a key to her apartment, saying that she can visit any time she wants. When Megan arrives back home, she finds Lacey has been there to leave her a piece of birthday cake.

== Production ==
=== Conception ===
Christopher Murphey created Body of Proof. Although he had worked in television for a number of years, Body of Proof was his first television production to be given a full series. Murphey loosely based his lead character, Megan Hunt, on a doctor he once worked with. Executive producer, Matthew Gross, revealed to Graham Flashner from Emmy Magazine that he "came up with the idea of a neurosurgeon who gets the rug pulled out from under her, personally and professionally." He helped Murphey script "Pilot" and they found the collaboration worked well, so they wrote the second episode together.

On May 14, 2010, it was announced Body of Proof had been picked up by the American Broadcasting Company (ABC). Along with the announcement of ten new shows, ABC President Steve McPherson said, "Our passion for great storytelling is at the core of everything we do. Finding and supporting writers, directors, producers and actors who share that passion is critical to our success. Our shows are the product of these collaborations, and we are thrilled to add 10 new series to our schedule". Gross believed that ABC had been looking for their version of House.

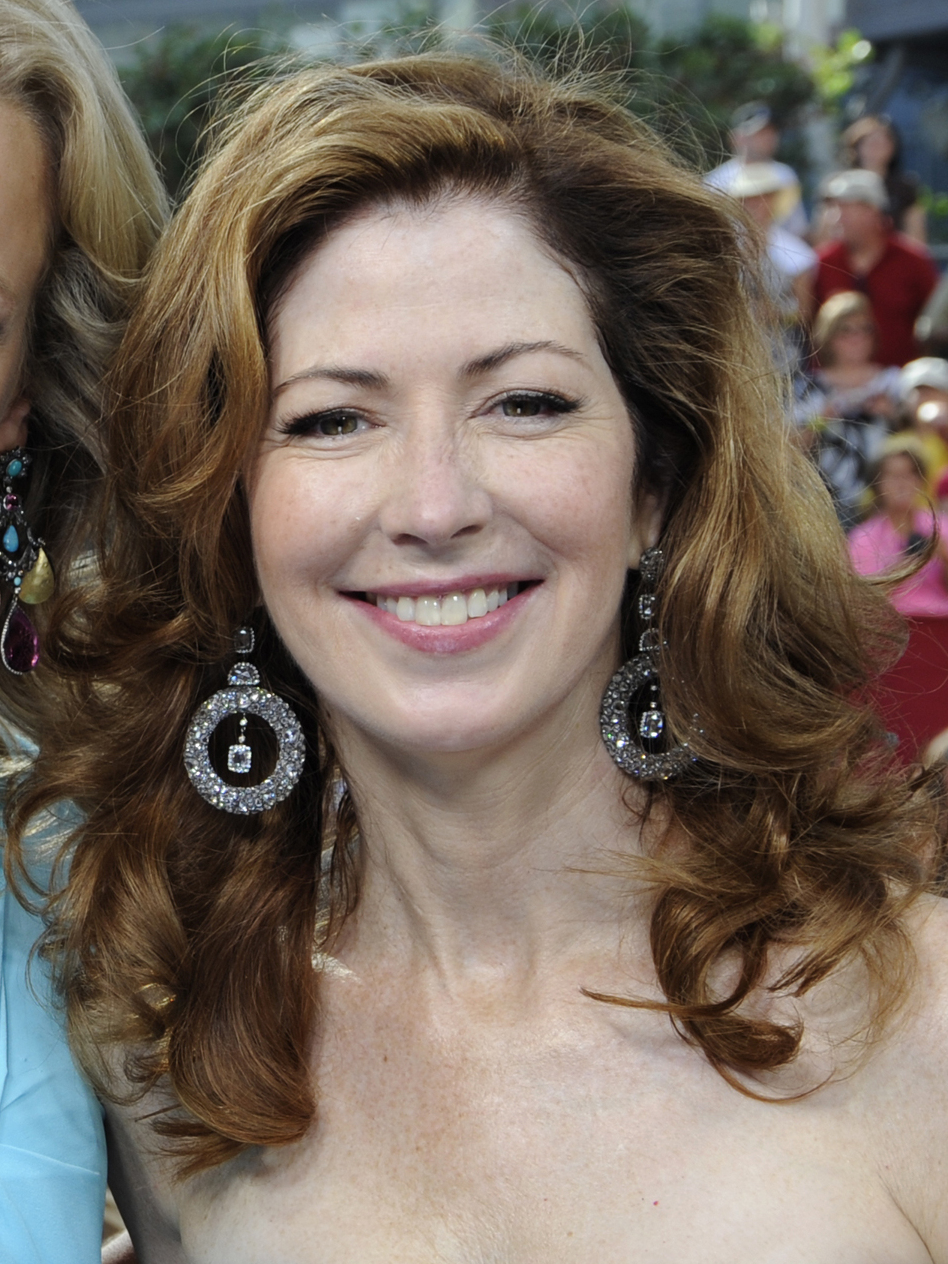
Actress Dana Delany was cast as Dr. Megan Hunt.

=== Filming ===
"Pilot" was directed by Nelson McCormick. Although set in Philadelphia, the first season of Body of Proof was actually filmed in Providence, Rhode Island. The pilot episode was shot in April 2010 and after ABC ordered twelve more episodes, the production returned to the area in July. Filming on the season ended in December. Patrick Preblick, a publicist for ABC, explained that a large majority of filming took place in a production facility in Warwick. Two weeks before filming the pilot, Delany was involved in a serious accident. She revealed "I totaled the car and broke two fingers. When you see me holding my finger in the show, massaging them, that's really me. They hurt." A representative from ABC later confirmed that some minor re-shooting of scenes in the pilot had occurred.

=== Casting ===
During a panel session at the 2010 TCA Press Tour, Dana Delany explained that she decided to leave Desperate Housewives and join Body of Proof because she "loved how complicated and smart her character was", believing that Megan was similar to the character she portrayed in China Beach from 1988 to 1991. To prepare for the role of Megan, Delany observed four autopsies and met with two female physicians, a neurosurgeon and a medical examiner. She also revealed that learning the medical terms was the hardest part of the job. She explained "It's really difficult. But a doctor told me that when you go to medical school, you learn 10,000 new words. They're all Greek- or Latin-based, so you can figure them out. But after shooting 15 hour days, to go home and learn these lines, I just thank God for iPad, so I can Google a word and figure it out."

Australian actor Nicholas Bishop was cast as medical investigator Peter Dunlop. Bishop auditioned for the role after reading the script and enjoying the relationship between Peter and Megan. When Bishop did not hear back from the show's executive producer straight away, he assumed that he had not won the part. Peter has been described as being laid back and by Frances Atkinson from The Age. Jeri Ryan was cast as Megan's boss Dr. Kate Murphy. The actress was given a "sympathetic" schedule, which enabled her to fly home to her husband and children, who remained in Los Angeles. Geoffrey Arend and Windell Middlebrooks portray Ethan Gross and Curtis Brumfield respectively. Delany described the characters as being similar to Abbott and Costello or Laurel and Hardy. "Pilot" also introduced Detectives Samantha Baker and Bud Morris played by Sonja Sohn and John Carroll Lynch.

The pilot episode also introduced Megan's ex-husband Todd Fleming played by Jeffrey Nordling and their teenage daughter Lacey played by Mary Mouser. The two characters would go on to recur throughout the season. Guest stars featured in "Pilot" were Sam Robards as Bradford Paige, Alice Barrett Mitchell as Bradford's wife, Jill, and Heather Arthur as the episode's murder victim, Angela Swanson.

== Broadcast ==
Body of Proof was set to premiere in the United States on October 22, 2010, with further episodes scheduled to be broadcast every Friday evening. However, the head of ABC, Paul Lee, decided to hold back Body of Proof to launch it in a more high-profile slot. The series then premiered on March 29, 2011 and was given the Tuesday 10pm slot. On November 29, 2010, Catriona Wightman from Digital Spy revealed that Body Of Proof would premiere in Italy, Spain and Hungary from January, before its launch in the US. Catherine Powell from The Walt Disney Company stated "Body Of Proof has generated buzz from the pilot stage and, in response to client demand, we're pleased to be bringing it to international viewers so early." In the UK, crime channel Alibi picked Body Of Proof up and aired the pilot on July 19, 2011. Channel 5 also picked the series up and broadcast "Pilot" on January 10, 2012.

=== Home media ===
"Pilot", along with the eight episodes from Body of Proof's first season, were released on a two-disc DVD set in the United States on September 20, 2011. The sets included brief audio commentaries from various crew and cast members for several episodes, a preview of season 2, a 10-minute "featurette" on the making of the show with commentaries from the medical consultants who helped with the script, and a "Contaminated Evidence" blooper reel.

== Reception ==
=== Ratings ===
Over the hour of broadcast, the first airing of "Pilot" drew an average of 13.942 million US viewers. The episode began with 14.727 million, but after the first half-hour it dropped to 12.975 million viewers. The episode received a 3.0 rating/8 share in the key adults 18–49 demographic. "Pilot" ranked ninth in the weekly program ratings and it became the second most watched series premiere of the 2010–11 television season, with CBS' Hawaii Five-0 securing more viewers. The episode also became ABC's most watched midseason drama debut in four years, while delivering the network's best results in the 10:00pm time slot with a regular hour-long program in six years. "Pilot" pulled in 777,000 viewers for UK broadcaster Alibi, giving them their biggest ever television audience. The episode was watched by 1.83 million viewers upon its airing on Channel 5.

=== Critical response ===
"Pilot" received mixed reviews from critics. Natalie Abrams from TV Guide included the episode in her feature on the "14 Promising Pilots" of the fall lineup. Brian Lowry from Variety wrote "Looking more and more like CBS, ABC adds another crime procedural with Body of Proof, which asks the burning question whether Quincy can seem cooler if you cast Dana Delany as the feisty medical examiner. The answer, strangely enough, is a qualified yes, with Delany appearing in virtually every scene, bringing class, sex appeal and a bit of humor to the central role." The critic added "The pilot essentially putties in details on the fly regarding Delany's Dr. Megan Hunt, the better to leap into a case showcasing her on-the-job savvy."

Mary McNamara from the Los Angeles Times wrote "Murphey and the writers will have to do a lot of heavy lifting for Body of Proof to transcend its immediate predictability. There's only so much Delany can do with a cardboard show. God may be in the details, but the walls still have to hold." The critic praised Delany, saying that she is "always interesting to watch" and called the rest of the cast "equally solid". The Pittsburgh Post-Gazette's Rob Owen also praised Delany and the supporting cast, but he commented that upon watching the episode for the first time, he thought Megan Hunt was "a fairly unsympathetic, cold character." He added "Body of Proof seems less likely to drive viewers away, at least not viewers content with whodunit crime procedurals. Body of Proof fits neatly and blandly in that tired category."

Joel Keller, writing for The Huffington Post, quipped that "Delany's charm can't overcome some pretty slipshod writing in the pilot." He believed that the show needed to "get away from the cliche" and explore more of Megan's personal life. A reporter from the South Wales Echo chose "Pilot" as one of their television "Highlights" for the week commencing January 7, 2012. Greg Hassall from The Sun-Herald gave the episode a rating of two out of five and stated "This is slick but soulless, combining implausible storylines with industrial-grade sentimentality. It's also depressing to see Sonja Sohn, who played Kima Greggs in The Wire, play a cop here. Her sour look says it all." Matt Roush of TV Guide was unsure about the show and whether it would win the ratings adding, "We'll have to wait and see".
