= Eric Laneuville =

American TV actor, director (born 1952)

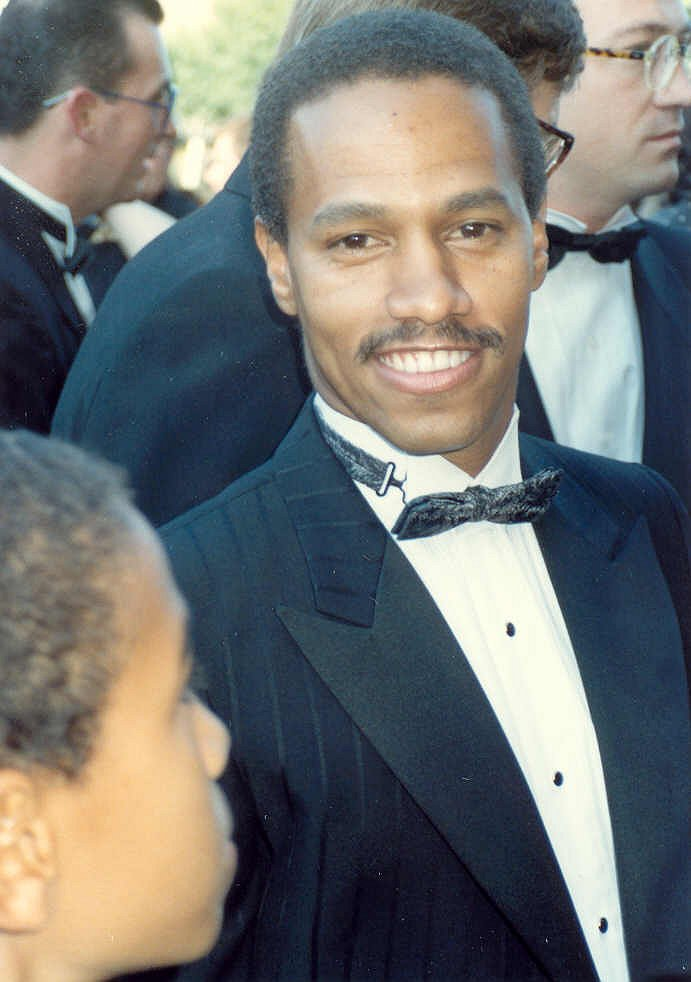
- Laneuville in 1989
- Born: Eric Gerard Laneuville; July 14, 1952 (age 74); New Orleans, Louisiana, U.S.
- Occupations: Actor; director; producer
- Years active: 1968–present

Eric Gerard Laneuville (born July 14, 1952) is an American television director, producer and actor. His first acting roles were in the science-fiction film The Omega Man (1971) with Charlton Heston, and the ABC television series Room 222 (1970–1973). His role as Luther Hawkins in the television series St. Elsewhere is his best known role. He also starred in A Force of One (1979) playing Charlie, the adopted son of Chuck Norris's character. Laneuville and Norris had previously appeared in an episode of Room 222. In more recent years, he frequently directs such one-hour dramas as Blue Bloods and NCIS: Los Angeles. He directed the Body of Proof episode "Missing". He also appeared in Love at First Bite.

== Career ==
=== Acting ===
Laneuville was born in New Orleans, Louisiana, the son of Mildred, a guidance counselor, and Alexander Laneuville. He began acting while attending Audubon Junior High School in the Crenshaw, Los Angeles, District. He often played juvenile characters younger than his own age. He appeared in several musicals staged at Audubon by drama teacher Mario Lomeli, including Bye Bye Birdie, Annie Get Your Gun, and Oklahoma!. While taking drama courses at nearby Susan Miller Dorsey High School, Laneuville began acting professionally, co-starring as a troubled youth in an award-winning television movie and becoming a semi-regular cast member on Room 222, including one episode in which he appeared with his future Force of One co-star Chuck Norris. He appeared in three episodes of Sanford and Son as Esther's adopted son. He was also in one episode of The Rookies, "Crossfire". In 1982, Laneuville landed the role of Luther Hawkins in the television series St. Elsewhere. He stayed with the series until it ended in 1988.

In addition to his appearance in The Omega Man (1971), Laneuville's other films included Black Belt Jones (1974), Death Wish (1974) opposite Charles Bronson, Shoot It Black, Shoot It Blue (1974), A Piece of the Action (1977), Love at First Bite (1979), A Force of One, (1979), The Baltimore Bullet (1980) and Back Roads (1981).

=== Directing ===
Laneuville began directing in 1984. His first directing assignments were for episodes of St. Elsewhere. He has subsequently directed episodes of L.A. Law (1986), Quantum Leap (1989), Doogie Howser, M.D. (1990), NYPD Blue (1993), ER (1995), 413 Hope St. (1997), Gilmore Girls (2004), Lie to Me (2009), Monk (2005), The Mentalist (2009–12), Invasion, Medium, Lost (2005–08), Girlfriends, Everybody Hates Chris, Prison Break, Blue Bloods, Ghost Whisperer, Grimm (2012–14) and Tommy, Chicago Fire.

In 1988, Laneuville became the first African-American television director to film in Russia, as he directed a two-part episode "Mission to Moscow" for the series, Head of the Class. In 1992 he won an Emmy for directing the episode "All God's Children" of the NBC series I'll Fly Away. He also directed the 2004 television film, America's Prince: The John F. Kennedy Jr. Story.

As his directing career took off, Laneuville's acting career continued only sporadically, usually in small cameo roles. His most recent on-camera appearance was on October 3, 2014, in a guest role on "Blue Bloods" in an episode he also directed. Prior to that, he had appeared as Dr. Lamar in the TV series Scrubs. He also appeared in the Fear of a Black Hat (1994), a mockumentary parodying 1990s hip-hop culture.

=== Producer credits ===
- Bull (executive producer)
- 413 Hope St. (executive producer)
- Midnight Caller (producer)
- Brand New Life (supervising producer)
- The Equalizer (2021 TV series) (executive producer)
