= Helping Hand (Body of Proof) =

- Body of Proof episode
- Peter Dunlop (Nicholas Bishop) (left), with Megan Hunt (Dana Delany) (middle), in her "cinched-waist jacket", and Samantha Baker (Sonja Sohn) (right) at the scene of murdered social worker, Elena Rosas. Critics praised Megan's and Peter's chemistry, as well as this scene, with one critic calling it one of her "favourite bits".
- Episode no.: Season 1 Episode 3
- Directed by: John Terlesky
- Written by: Corey Miller
- Production code: 107
- Original air date: April 5, 2011

Guest appearances
- Tony Plana as Armando Rosas; Yaya DaCosta as Holly Bennett; Tobias Segal as Sean Wilcox; Edoardo Ballerini as Jeremy Nichols; Zach McGowan as Vincent Stone; Charise Castro Smith as Elena Rosas

Episode chronology
← Previous "Letting Go"	Next → "Talking Heads"
- Body of Proof (season 1)

"Helping Hand" is the third episode of the first season of the American medical drama Body of Proof. It was originally broadcast in the United States on ABC on April 5, 2011. The episode was directed by John Terlesky and written by Corey Miller.

In this episode, Megan (Dana Delany) is shocked after the victim in a shooting is a previous patient when she was a neurosurgeon; however she only remembers the procedure of the woman. Detective Morris (John Carroll Lynch) and Detective Baker (Sonja Sohn) lead the case, interviewing many leads from the crime scene, which results in finding the unexpected killer. Meanwhile; Megan tries to build a better relationship with her colleagues.

The episode received overwhelming positive reviews, and was watched by 11.15 million viewers, according to Nielsen ratings, on the Tuesday night it aired in the United States. Delany and Lynch received praise from critics for their double act, with being Bud called a "real joy to watch" and his lines, "the best" and that he is the shows "funny guy". The episode's storyline was well received and critics thanked the show for not being "too gory".

== Plot ==
Social worker Elena Rosas (Charise Castro Smith) is found shot dead in a motel. When Megan Hunt (Dana Delany) looks through her autopsy scan, she notices Elena had brain surgery and gets a shock when she realizes that Elena was one of her patients as she used to be a neurosurgeon, however she cannot remember her, just the procedure. Megan speaks with Elena's father Armando (Tony Plana), who remembers Megan from the surgery, and tells her that Elena saw Megan as a role model, due to Elena's mother early death. After speaking with Elena's boss Jeremy Nicholls (Edoardo Ballerini), he states that he cannot understand why Elena was in a motel, as she had no appointments near that location. Traces of breast milk are found on Elena's shirt, showing she was near a baby when she died, which leads them to Holly Bennett (Yaya DaCosta), one of Elena's clients. She reveals that her baby nearly got taken away due to her drug addicted boyfriend, and that whilst Elena was visiting her baby vomited on her, but left in a hurry before she could clean it up. Megan and Detective Bud Morris (John Carroll Lynch) visit Armando to ask if Elena was in a relationship; hence why she was in a motel. They find out that it is Jeremy, but he says that Elena ended their relationship hours before she died.

Megan finds out that the shooter was in fact outside the room. They find Sean Wilcox's (Tobias Segal) skin on the bullet, a recently released criminal. Sean denies killing Elena, but states that he was one of Elena's patients, and that she had rented the motel room for him, to give him a place to stay. After falling asleep in the room, he awoke after hearing a shot. After seeing Elena dead on the floor, and himself injured, he ran after thinking no one would believe his account of what happened. After Bud and Detective Samantha Baker (Sonja Sohn) meet with Sean's "friend" Vincent Stone (Zach McGowan), he admits that he was warned off by Elena after phoning Sean six times in one day, so Samantha and Bud start to develop a theory about how Vincent killed Elena. After persuasion by Peter Dunlop (Nicholas Bishop), Sean helps the police, which allows them to get an arrest warrant for Vincent, however Megan finds rice flour on the bullet, which concludes that Vincent did not kill Elena. The rice flour leads them back to Holly, as she has a baby, and rice flour is commonly used for babies. They arrest Holly, who reveals that Elena visited her and discovers Holly was back on drugs, and was going to take Holly's baby. Holly followed Elena, and shot her to prevent this from happening. After the confession, social services arrive, and take Holly's baby away. Back at the office, Curtis Brumfield (Windell Middlebrooks) plays pranks towards Megan and Peter tells Megan that Bud is experiencing marriage problems, so Megan tells him about how to deal with the marriage problems, as Megan is a divorcée.

== Production ==
"Helping Hand" was written by Corey Miller and directed by John Terlesky, most known for directing television series such as Ugly Betty and, Boston Legal. Daniel Licht who has worked on the series since its inception, returned to compose the music for the episode. After the previous episode "Letting Go" aired on Sunday April 3, the normal timeslot of a Tuesday was resumed for this episode. Actor Tony Plana (best known for his role in Ugly Betty, Resurrection Blvd and more recently Desperate Housewives) guest starred in the episode as Armando Rosas. Yaya DaCosta, runner up of America's Next Top Model, Cycle 3 appeared as Holly Bennett and Tobias Segal starred as Sean Wilcox. Playing more minor roles were; Edoardo Ballerini as Jeremy Nicholls, Zach McGowan as Vincent Stone and Charise Castro Smith as this episode's victim, Elena Rosas. This episode was originally meant to mark the first appearance of Joan Hunt (Joanna Cassidy), Megan's mother, however for unknown reasons, her debut episode was changed to the sixth episode of the first season, "Society Hill".

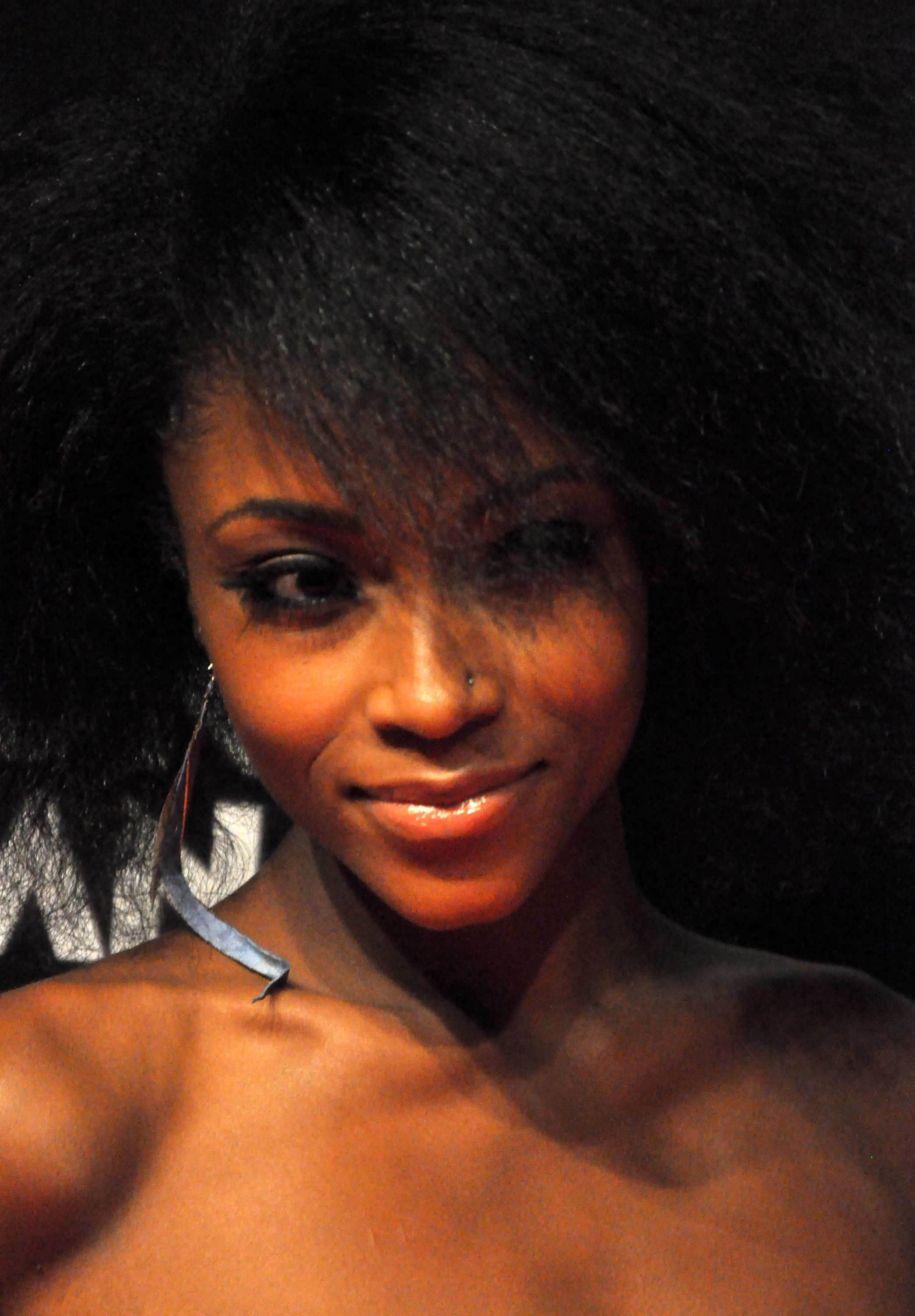
Yaya DaCosta (pictured) played Holly Bennett, this episode's murderer.

"Helping Hand", along with the eight episode's from Body of Proof's first season, were released on a two-disc DVD set in the United States on September 20, 2011. The sets included brief audio commentaries from various crew and cast members for several episode's, a preview of season 2 and a 10-minute "featurette" on the making of the show, with commentaries from the medical consultants who helped with the script, as well as a "Contaminated Evidence" blooper reel.

== Reception ==
=== Ratings ===
In its original American broadcast on April 5, 2011, "Helping Hand" was seen by 11.15 million viewers, according to Nielsen ratings. Among viewers between ages 18 and 49, it received a 2.4 rating/9 share; a share represents the percentage of households using a television at the time the program is airing. This episode achieved a much higher number of viewers than the previous episode, "Letting Go". However, the higher ratings than "Letting Go" was likely due to that episode moving from the normal Tuesday timeslot to a Sunday night. This episode also had a minimal higher viewer number than subsequent episode "Talking Heads". Body of Proof came fourth in the ratings on Tuesday night, it was outperformed by the ABC's Dancing with the Stars and two episodes of CBS's NCIS. "Helping Hand" was watched by 1.77 million viewers upon its airing on Channel 5 in the United Kingdom.

=== Critical response ===
The best bits involve Hunt wafting into the crime scene in her high heels and cinched-waist jacket, then clocking all the salient details while "clever person at work" music percolates over the soundtrack. It's a smooth, unchallenging watch. Delany is effortlessly likeable as Hunt and, while her cohorts are sketchily drawn, they do show promise.

— Mark Braxton,
Radio Times (Note: Although the review for this episode on this source is correct; the credits are not, as they are for the previous episode; "Letting Go".)

"Helping Hand" received overwhelming positive reviews. Of the episode, Christine Orlando of TV Fanatic said, "As I'm realizing how much I'm thoroughly enjoying the characters on Body of Proof, "Helping Hand" has Megan finally noticing how little she knows about them. The best part is, she does something to try and change that and the results are both comical and touching". Orlando praised the scenes between Megan and Curtis, calling them "great" and saying, "Nothing makes you a part of the team like falling for a well-meaning office prank". On the Megan and Bud scenes she said that Megan was "sweet" and "funny" but called her attempts at consoling Bud "clumsy", adding; "Neither completely trusts the other but their growing professional respect has the potential to also become a personal friendship". On this, she said that Bud had some of the best lines in the episode, calling them "the best". She hoped that Peter and Megan's relationship will be explored further and wanted to know "just how these two became partners". Finally, she was glad it was not too "gory" and summarized, "On Body of Proof I'm more interested in the characters than the graphic medical details. Thankfully they continue to give me plenty of what I want". TV OverMind's Carissa Pavlica said she was "really enjoying" the relationship between Kate Murphy (Jeri Ryan) and Megan. Pavlica explained, "In the Pilot, the other medical examiners seemed to hope they could somehow get rid of Megan by tattling on things to Kate. This week, as she saw Megan struggle in her connection with the living, she attempted to reach out and give advice". Of the plot of the episode, Pavlica said;

Did anyone else see the conclusion of the case ahead of time? I was at a total loss. I had written off the baby's mother as soon as they spoke with her. No many shows are able to do that. I can almost always narrow it down to at least two and one of them would be right. I was so far off the mark on with this and I loved it! I love when a show can surprise me.

Like TV Fanatic's Christina Orlando, Pavlica commented on Bud adding that he was a "real joy to watch" saying he said the "craziest things", adding that he is the shows "funny guy". Like Orlando, she praised the interaction between Bud and Megan, saying that "her talk with Bud about his divorce gave her a more human feel", adding "The show should get stronger as the interpersonal relationships do". TV Equals's Michelle Carlbert said she liked the music throughout the episode and the scenes with Bud and Megan. She also stated that one of her "favourite bits" was when she was "just as curious as Hunt when Peter and Baker were discussing Bud". Finally, Carlbert said that she enjoyed the scenes between Curtis, Megan and Ethan Gross (Geoffrey Arend).
