= Dead Man Walking (Body of Proof) =

- Body of Proof episode
- Episode no.: Season 1 Episode 5
- Directed by: Matthew Gross
- Written by: Christopher Murphey
- Production code: 110
- Original air date: April 19, 2011

Guest appearances
- Carolyn McCormick as Gwen Baldwin; Marc Blucas as Doctor Chandler; Milena Govich as Mindy Harbinson; Meta Golding as Nancy Follett; Christina Hendricks as Jessica / Karen Archer; Jarrett Alexander as Carl Anders; Dan Amboyer as George White; Peter Jay Fernandez as Doug Hollis; Kevin Kaine as Ted Harbison; John Fiore as Henry; Rachel Oyama as Mary

Episode chronology
← Previous "Talking Heads"	Next → "Society Hill"
- Body of Proof (season 1)

"Dead Man Walking" is the fifth episode of the first season of the American medical drama Body of Proof. It was originally broadcast in the United States on ABC on April 19, 2011. The episode was directed by Matthew Gross and written by series creator Christopher Murphey.

In the episode, Megan (Dana Delany) investigates the murder of Ted Harbison (Kevin Kaine), who dies shortly after surgery and has to face up to her past, by going back to her former hospital; and Ethan (Geoffrey Arend) and Curtis (Windell Middlebrooks) autopsy Jessica Archer (Christina Hendricks), a woman who died from a blood clot, and meet her twin sister Karen (Hendricks), for whom Ethan begins to develop feelings.

The episode received positive reviews, and was watched by 11.30 million viewers, according to Nielsen ratings, on the Tuesday night it aired in the United States. Critics praised Hendricks, with one stating that "guest stars like this should help keep up the quality", saying her role was "lovely". Christine Orlando from TV Fanatic called it "one of its most entertaining episode's yet" due to the partnership between Ethan and Curtis.

== Plot ==
Ted Harbison (Kevin Kaine) is found dead in a park. Dr. Megan Hunt (Dana Delany) investigates into his death and during the investigation, it is revealed Ted had surgery just before he died, and Megan finds three surgical staples that weren't closed fully, causing him to bleed out internally, causing Megan to think that Ted was murdered. Megan visits her old hospital, where she was once a neurosurgeon. Ted's surgeon, Doctor Chandler (Marc Blucas) has a reputation for recklessness while performing surgeries and Megan finds out that the video was never turned on, meaning the surgery was never recorded. While at the hospital, Megan meets her old friend and the hospital administrator Gwen Baldwin (Carolyn McCormick) and while there Gwen reveals her son died of an overdose. Meanwhile, in Philadelphia, Ethan (Geoffrey Arend) and Curtis (Windell Middlebrooks) autopsy Jessica Archer (Christina Hendricks), with both Ethan and Curtis unsure how she died. Jessica's twin sister arrives, Karen (Hendricks), and she and Ethan are attracted to each other.

Meanwhile, Megan discovers that the surgical staple gun was tampered with. The guns come in packs of three but the pack was broken up between three surgeries, one was given to Ted, another to George White (Dan Amboyer) who Megan has to perform emergency surgery on after finding him near-dead, and the third staple gun was not used. Megan finds traces of fungus found on bonsai trees on the staple guns and Megan realizes that Gwen has bonsai trees. When her son died, he was pledging for the fraternity where George is president. Gwen tampered with the staple guns to kill George, not realizing that the pack would be broken up. Ethan and Curtis find out that Jessica had a genetic mutation that caused a blood clot, so Ethan warns Karen that she might also have one. Megan confronts Gwen, who confesses to Megan. Gwen is eventually taken away by the police, after admitting to George's attempted, and Ted's accidental murder.

== Production ==
"Dead Man Walking" was written by series creator Christopher Murphey and directed by Matthew Gross, best known for directing Dirty Sexy Money and Day Break, and films such as Fired Up! and Joe Somebody. This was Gross's first episode as a director, but he wrote the second episode of season one, "Letting Go", alongside Murphey. Daniel Licht who has worked on the series since its inception, returned to compose the music for the episode. Actresses Christina Hendricks (best known for her role in Mad Men) and Carolyn McCormick (best known for her role in Law & Order) guest starred in the episode as Jessica/ Karen Archer and Gwen Baldwin, respectively. As well as Hendricks and McCormick, and actor Marc Blucas (best known for his role in Buffy the Vampire Slayer) played Dr. Chandler, as well as actresses Milena Govich and Meta Golding also guest starring in the episode. Regular cast member John Carroll Lynch who plays Detective Bud Morris, did not appear in this episode, although was credited.

"Dead Man Walking", along with the eight episode's from Body of Proof's first season, were released on a two-disc DVD set in the United States on September 20, 2011. The sets included brief audio commentaries from various crew and cast members for several episode's, a preview of season 2 and a 10-minute "featurette" on the making of the show, with commentaries from the medical consultants who helped with the script, as well as a "Contaminated Evidence" blooper reel.

== Reception ==
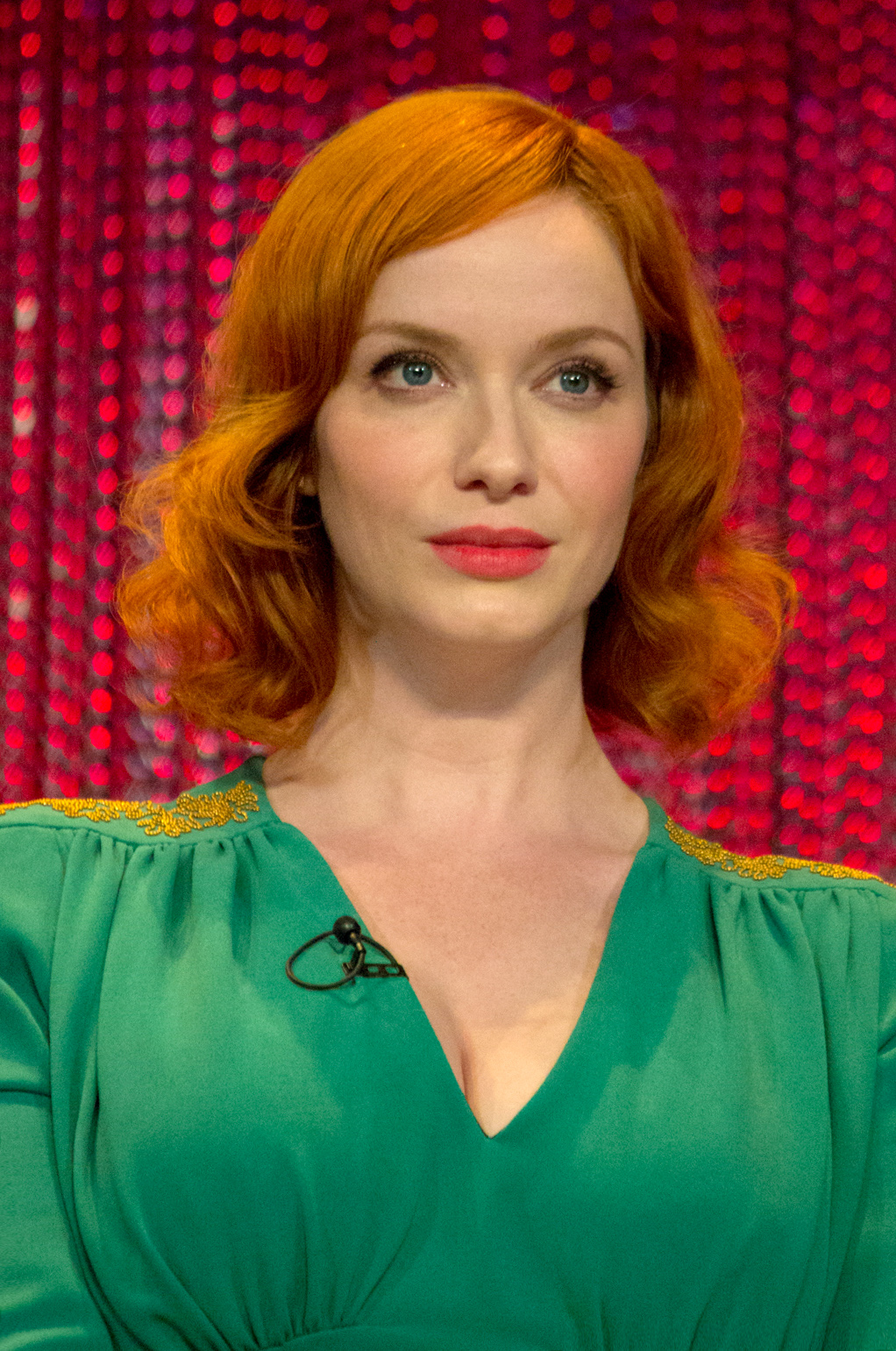
Christina Hendricks (pictured) guest starred as a potential love interest for Ethan (Geoffrey Arend); in real life, Hendricks is married to Arend.

=== Ratings ===
In its original American broadcast on April 19, 2011, "Dead Man Walking" was seen by 11.3 million viewers, according to Nielsen ratings. Among viewers between ages 18 and 49, it received a 2.4 rating/9 share; a share represents the percentage of households using a television at the time the program is airing. This episode achieved higher viewers than the previous episode, "Talking Heads", but a lower number of viewers than the subsequent episode "Society Hill ". Body of Proof came seventh in the ratings on Tuesday night, it was outperformed by the CBS police procedural drama NCIS, as well as ABC's Dancing with the Stars. "Dead Man Walking" was watched by 1.75 million viewers upon its airing on Channel 5 in the United Kingdom.

=== Critical response ===
"Dead Man Walking" received positive reviews. Jessica Banov from FayObserver said that Body of Proof was finding its "groove" due to this episode, as well as highly praising Hendricks guest role, saying that "guest stars like this should help keep up the quality". Christine Orlando from TV Fanatic also praised the episode, calling it "one of its most entertaining episode's yet". She also praised the character development between Megan and Peter (Nicholas Bishop), as well as praising the partnership between Ethan and Curtis, saying that they "made up for" the fact Bud was not in the episode. She said, "This partnership just keeps getting better and the visual of the two of them in bio-hazard suits was so comical. I look forward to more of these two as the show continues". She was also "glad" that Dr. Kate Murphy (Jeri Ryan) had a bigger role, summarising that the "character interaction sells this show". Like Banov, Orlando praised Hendricks guest role, saying it was "lovely" and that "she and real life husband Geoffrey Arend had a sweet sort of chemistry". She also hope that Hendricks would reprise her role as Karen, stating that it would be "wonderful". Finally, Orlando said that her favourite scene was with Kate in, when she and "an entire team of cops going in to a hospital and shutting it down". She called it, "Dramatic, but effective".
