= Billie Worley =

American actor

- Born: Billie Worley
- Occupation: Actor
- Years active: 1989 — present

Billie Ray Worley is an American film and television actor. He played Patrick Quinn on the U.S. TV show Early Edition. He is also a musician.

In the 2014 comedy film Tennessee Queer, Worley played Dewayne Cotton, a mayoral candidate who opposes the town's first gay pride parade.

== Filmography ==
Movies

- Hear No Evil (1993)
- I Love Trouble (1994)
- Strange Days (1995)
- I Woke Up Early the Day I Died (1998)
- How to Make the Cruelest Month (1998)
- Angel In Training (1999)
- Space Cowboys (2000)
- Bad Meat (2004)
- Daylight Fades (2009)
- Tennessee Queer (2012)

TV Movies

- Tad (1995)
- Piranha (1995)
- Weapons of Mass Distraction (1997)
- The Pentagon Wars (1998)
- How to Make the Cruelest Month (1998)

Movies That Went Straight To Video

- The Vernonia Incident (1989)
- Brain Smasher... A Love Story (1993)
- Fraternity Massacre at Hell Island (2007)

Television

- The Adventures of Brisco County, Jr. (1993, 1 Episode)
- Murphy Brown (1993, 1 Episode)
- Nurses (1994, 1 Episode)
- ER (1997, 1 Episode)
- Leaving L.A. (1997, 6 Episodes)
- Poltergeist: The Legacy (1998, 1 Episode)
- Cupid (1 Episode)
- Early Edition (1998–1999, 28 Episodes)
- Judging Amy (2003–2006, 1 Episode)
- Love & Money (2000, 1 Episode)
- Any Day Now (2001, 1 Episode)

Producer

- Memphis Heat: The True Story of Memphis Wrasslin' (2010) (Post-Production)
