= Breaking In (1989 film) =

1989 film by Bill Forsyth

- Original release poster
- Directed by: Bill Forsyth
- Written by: John Sayles
- Produced by: Harry Gittes
- Starring: Burt Reynolds; Casey Siemaszko
- Cinematography: Michael Coulter
- Edited by: Michael Ellis
- Music by: Michael Gibbs
- Production company: Act III Communications
- Distributed by: The Samuel Goldwyn Company
- Release date: October 13, 1989
- Running time: 94 minutes
- Country: United States
- Language: English
- Budget: $5.5 million
- Box office: $1.9 million

Breaking In is a 1989 American crime comedy film directed by Bill Forsyth, written by John Sayles, and starring Burt Reynolds, Casey Siemaszko and Lorraine Toussaint. The film follows professional small-time criminals as they live and practice their trades.

== Plot ==
Ernie Mullins is New York's 61-year-old pro safecracker, who is operating now in Portland, Oregon. Mike is the "nosy, amiable kid" who Ernie takes on as his lookout and apprentice after they encounter each other (Ernie tried robbing the safe while Mike broke in, just to enjoy some of the comforts of the house). The two engage in a few heists together, such as one involving a supermarket and a friendly dog, and a Fourth of July robbery of an amusement park during a fireworks show. Ernie is content to live in a tract home on the fringe of the city, but Mike cannot resist using his newfound money for material items, and his firing from the mechanic shop serves to drive a wedge between the two.

Ernie maintains a steady, paying relationship with a prostitute, Delphine, who fixes Mike up with her apprentice, Carrie. Their relationship does not last long, however, as Mike's desire for her to not need to use her body for money leads her to leave him.

Also featured is a pair of retired crooks, Ernie's card-playing pals, Johnny and Shoes, and a pair of adversarial lawyers.

Mike's newfound wealth perks the suspicions of the authorities, and he has to try to not turn in Ernie to get a lighter sentence. Instead, he admits to his crimes, along with ones that Ernie did, which garners him a nine-year sentence, but keeps his friendship with Ernie intact.

== Cast ==
- Burt Reynolds as Ernie Mullins
- Casey Siemaszko as Mike Lafeve
- Lorraine Toussaint as Delphine the Hooker
- Sheila Kelley as Carrie aka Fontaine
- Albert Salmi as Johnny Scot, Poker Player
- Harry Carey as Shoes, Poker Player
- Maury Chaykin as Vincent Tucci, Attorney
- Stephen Tobolowsky as District Attorney

== Production ==
The film was shot in Portland, Oregon. Forsyth envisioned John Mahoney for the lead role, but Act III Productions wanted a higher profile name. Jack Nicholson and Paul Newman were each offered the role, but declined. Prompted to have a star, Reynolds was eventually asked to do the film. It was Reynolds's first character role. "I've spent an entire career... making the characters me," he said. "This is the first time I've done it the other way around."

Reynolds worked for SAG scale because he was an admirer of the script and of Forsyth. John Sayles normally directed his own scripts, but did not do this one because he did not feel that he had the sense of humor to bring it off.

Forsyth, too, normally directed his own scripts, but took on Breaking In in an attempt to make contact with a larger mainstream audience:

I can't get away with making $6- or $7-million movies (e.g., Local Hero and Housekeeping) with the kind of audience that my past movies have reached. I've just got to find an audience-or retreat. And I'm quite happy to retreat, I'm happy to go back to Scotland and make smaller movies like Gregory's Girl. But at the same time, Breaking In seemed a comfortable experiment for me. Because although I say I'm trying to reach that audience or see how far that audience is from me, I don't think I'm going that far to get them. . . . You could read [the Breaking In script] very innocently as a kind of nice caper with nice characters. But underneath that there is so much compromise and so much duplicity and so much blackmail going on that it seemed to have lots of levels I could work on.

He later described it as "an awkward little movie. It’s not an American film and it’s not a European film; it’s ungraspable what it is."

== Reception ==
=== Box office ===
The film was not a commercial success. After closing out the 27th New York Film Festival in 1989, it opened in 400 theaters at number 12 in its opening weekend (October 13–15), with $679,200, but returned less than $2 million in total box-office receipts.

=== Critical response ===
Critically, the film was favorably received. On Rotten Tomatoes, the film has a rating of 80% based on 10 reviews.

Vincent Canby of The New York Times wrote that the film had "a lot of the appeal of a 1949 Oldsmobile convertible that still looks almost new and drives like a dream, if none too fast. Speed is not of the essence here...Mr. Reynolds has not appeared more fit - nor has he given a more accomplished performance - in a very long time."

Roger Ebert of the Chicago Sun-Times called the film "a well-written, well-directed picture. Reynolds has a comfortable screen presence and can act…he shows the warmth and quirkiness that made him fun to watch in the first place."

Decades later, Reynolds biographer Wayne Byrne praised the film as "a quiet, beautiful piece of work, one of the most understated and underrated in the Reynolds catalogue".

Stanley Kauffmann of The New Republic criticized the script, writing that it "begins promisingly and then leads to very little." However Kauffman was complimentary of Bill Forsyth's direction and above all Reynolds's performance, writing that "the star is not much different here, but he's himself even more fully, at complete and engaging ease...Aging becomes Reynolds: it underscores his poise, his nonchalance about stardom."
