= Body of Proof season 3 =

Body of Proof
- Season 3
- No. of episodes: 13

Release
- Original network: ABC
- Original release: February 19 – May 28, 2013

Season chronology
- ← Previous; Season 2

The third and final season of Body of Proof, an American television series created by Christopher Murphey, aired in the United States from February 19, 2013 to May 28, 2013 and consisted of 13 episodes. It follows the life and career of Dr. Megan Hunt, a medical examiner, once a neurosurgeon, who now works in Philadelphia's Medical Examiner's office after a car accident ended her neurosurgery career.

On May 10, 2013, ABC canceled Body of Proof after three seasons. Immediately after the cancellation news, there were reports that the series might be picked up by a cable television network, with TNT, USA Network and WGN America all showing interest. On May 23, however, a rep for ABC Studios confirmed that Body of Proof would not move to a new network. Dana Delany confirmed that the May 28, 2013 season finale would also be the series finale with a Tweet: "Thank you to all who campaigned for #BodyOfProof4. 3rd most watched drama @abcnetwork thanks to you. I will miss Dr. Megan Hunt & Co. RIP."

== Cast ==
Character	Portrayed by	Main cast	Recurring cast
Megan Hunt	Dana Delany	entire season	—N/a
Kate Murphy	Jeri Ryan	entire season	—N/a
Tommy Sullivan	Mark Valley	entire season	—N/a
Ethan Gross	Geoffrey Arend	entire season	—N/a
Curtis Brumfield	Windell D. Middlebrooks	entire season	—N/a
Adam Lucas	Elyes Gabel	10 episodes (Note: Elyes Gabel is credited in "Lost Souls", "Skin and Bones" and "Committed" though he does not appear.)	—N/a
Lacey Fleming	Mary Mouser	7 episodes (Note: Mary Mouser is credited in "Mob Mentality", "Fallen Angel", "Skin and Bones", "Disappearing Act", "Breakout" and "Daddy Issues" though she does not appear.)	—N/a
Dan Russell	Richard Burgi	—N/a	6 episodes
Joan Hunt	Joanna Cassidy	—N/a	6 episodes

=== Casting ===
In June 2012, it was announced that John Carroll Lynch, and Nicholas Bishop had chosen not to renew their contracts, and that they wouldn't be returning for another season. It was then announced that Sonja Sohn would not return to the series, as her character wasn't going to be asked back for another season. In August 2012, it was announced that Mark Valley was tapped to play the lead male detective in the new season, as Tommy Sullivan, a former love interest of Megan's. Just as it was announced that Mark Valley would be joining the series, it was announced that Elyes Gabel would be joining the cast as Adam Lucas, a new police detective and Tommy's partner. All other cast members, including Dana Delany, Jeri Ryan, Geoffrey Arend, Windell Middlebrooks and Mary Mouser, are expected to return in their series regular slots. Both Jeffrey Nordling and Joanna Cassidy are expected to remain as recurring characters throughout the season. In August 2012, it was announced that Annie Wersching had been cast as Yvonne Kurtz in a recurring role. Luke Perry reprises his Season 2 role as Charlie Stafford in multiple episodes, his character having now been promoted to county health commissioner. In September 2012, it was announced that Michael Nouri was to guest star in an episode as Daniel Russo, and that Ray Wise and Derek Webster are expected to guest star, while Tim DeKay had been cast in an unknown guest spot.

In October 2012, it was announced that Desperate Housewives actor Richard Burgi had been cast in a recurring role as Dan Russell, a Philadelphia DA who tries to convince Kate to run for political office. It was also reported that Charmed actor Ivan Sergei had been tapped to play Sergei, a potential love interest for Kate. It was also announced that Henry Ian Cusick is set to play Trent Marsh as a guest star. Tony Von Halle and Jenny Lin are both reported to have booked guest roles as Mark McDaniels and an Intern respectively. In November 2012, it was announced that Lorraine Toussaint had been cast as Angela Martin. In December 2012, it was reported that Brothers & Sisters star, Sarah Jane Morris, had been cast as a flight attendant named Pamela Jacks.

=== Development ===
Body of Proof was officially picked up for a third season with a 13 episode order, and was set to premiere sometime mid-season. In December 2012, it was announced that the season would premiere on February 5, 2013 on Tuesdays at 10pm. But in January 2013, it was announced that the premiere had been moved from February 5 to February 19, so that the network would be able to air all thirteen episodes in a row without being pre-empted by a speech that Barack Obama, the just-re-elected President of the United States, was slated to make on February 12. In January 2013, during an interview, it was announced that story-lines for the season would include Kate going into politics, and that Megan would be probing more deeply into her father's suicide, for which she would most likely get closure by the season finale.

== Episodes ==
No. overall	No. in season	Title	Directed by	Written by	Original release date	Prod. code	US viewers (millions)
30	1	"Abducted – Part 1"	Michael Watkins	Christopher Murphey	February 19, 2013	301	6.75
After being on sabbatical for three months, Megan comes back to work after Peter's death. As she begins the case of an alcoholic who died, she finds that the building behind him has five other dead bodies. While investigating, she sees that part of the new police force is Tommy Sullivan, someone from her past 20 years ago. As the case goes deeper, they find not only that their victims are veterans, but also that they all had their spleens removed, prompting Megan to believe that a plastic surgeon is the one behind it. Kate has a meeting with a friend of hers and finds that he wants her to run for office; meanwhile, Tommy's partner Adam questions Tommy on what happened in his and Megan's past. After looking after a renowned plastic surgeon, they come across where he is killing his victims and Megan is forced to perform emergency surgery on the man they were using for 'bait' to catch the serial killer. After everyone believes that the case is over, Megan still questions what the doctor was putting in the bodies. Just as Megan is finding what was inserted in the body, she gets a call from Lacey's phone, only to find that someone has kidnapped her daughter. Victims: Sergeant Vilmer Brazas; Specialist Douglas Kessler; Staff Sergeant Vincent Morgado; Corporal Joel Moskowitz; Corporal Caleb Witsman; Doctor Harvey Wallace; Alyssa Wallace; Army Staff Sergeant Karl Simmons (Alive, but then blown up by selfmade bomb); Murderers: Doctor Wallace; Karl Simmons; Nurse Yvonne Kurtz
31	2	"Abducted – Part 2"	Ralph Hemecker	Evan Katz	February 26, 2013	302	6.37
After finding out that her daughter had been kidnapped, Megan tries to hide the fact that there is a bomb in the body of their victim, and that her daughter is missing. While Kate, Curtis, and Ethan begin realizing that something is off about Megan. Megan gets distraught when she is called on to the case of a teenage girl who was shot in the back, only to find that it was Dr. Wallace's daughter. As she goes to the man she just saved to see if he remembered anything, Tommy follows her, forcing her to tell him about Lacey's kidnapping. After meeting up with the kidnapper, and getting tazed, Megan awakes in a van with the very same man she just saved, only to find out that he, the doctor, and the doctor's head nurse Yvonne Kurtz (Annie Wersching), were involved in a plan to send a message out about wounded veterans. When Megan gets to her daughter, she finds that they are uninterested in the bomb, but they want Megan to implant the bomb in the man she had just saved. Tommy and his team barge into a building, thinking that Megan is in there, only to find that they took the tracking device out. Kate questions Ethan about why Megan is gone, only to realize that Megan has gone missing. After implanting the bomb, Megan plans an escape, only for it to fail. Just as Kurtz is about to shoot Megan, Tommy barges in and kills Kurtz. Victims: Sergeant Vilmer Brazas; Specialist Douglas Kessler; Staff Sergeant Vincent Morgado; Corporal Joel Moskowitz; Corporal Caleb Witsman; Doctor Harvey Wallace; Alyssa Wallace; Army Staff Sergeant Karl Simmons (Alive, but then blown up by selfmade bomb); Murderers: Doctor Wallace; Karl Simmons; Nurse Yvonne Kurtz
32	3	"Lost Souls"	David Von Ancken	Allen MacDonald	March 5, 2013	305	6.59
Megan and Tommy are called onto the case of a young teenage girl who came into a clinic and broke her own arm, but Megan gets frustrated when everyone around her makes it sound like the young girl was possessed. Kate finds it hard to juggle campaigning and working her job; when Megan and Tommy go to the victim's house, they find both that the father is a very religious man, and that he strictly enforces it on his children. Megan and Tommy both suspect the father of having done it, but things change with another one of the daughters begin having the same symptoms. Curtis and Ethan get freaked out when they find crosses on the victim's body. Megan finds that the doctor who had worked on their victim was in a sexual relationship with her sister, who also stole PCP from him, meaning that she was poisoning her sister so that she could get more attention from her parents. Megan questions what she believes in when the sister tells her, "Quarter for your jacket, pumpkin?" This had been the same thing her father had told her. Victims: Rebecca Banks; Chelsea Banks (Alive); Murderers: Hannah Banks
33	4	"Mob Mentality"	Christine Moore	Alexi Hawley	March 12, 2013	304	6.60
Megan and Tommy investigate the case of a mob leader's son killed in a shooting, but when they arrive on the scene, they find that someone has now targeted them too, as they go under fire. The mob leader then proceeds to threaten Megan when he learns of his son's death. Tommy seems to have a past with the mob leader when he goes to his house. Megan finds that the child was not as innocent as everyone had believed him to be; he was beginning to get into the family business of selling drugs, but doing so on his own with the help of a former inmate and current gym owner who has supposedly gone straight. Megan gets angry with Tommy when he tells her she is no longer as spontaneous as she used to be, prompting her to go on a date with him, only to find that he had set up the date beforehand. When Megan, Tommy and Adam go to investigate a perpetrator, she finds the perfect way to be spontaneous. In a twisted turn of events, they find that the father had killed his son, in an effort to keep him from starting a competing drug business. Victims: Nicholas Russo; Jaxon Ware; Murderers: Daniel Russo
34	5	"Eye for an Eye"	Alex Zakrzewski	Corey Miller	March 19, 2013	307	8.42
Megan and Tommy investigate two murders that seem to be the work of a vigilante. Megan uncovers a possible link through a grief counselor named Trent Marsh (Henry Ian Cusick). Kate prepares to announce that she's running for public office. Meanwhile, Megan's mother Joan is selling her house, and an upset Megan confronts her about a box of her father's items she found, including his suicide note. Megan asks Tommy to get the note's handwriting analyzed, as she refuses to believe that her father killed himself. Victims: Freddie Delgado; Lori Keyser; Murderers: Doctor Trent Marsh
35	6	"Fallen Angel"	Christine Moore	Diane Ademu-John	March 26, 2013	306	9.59
Kate falls for a handsome and mysterious man named Sergei at a political event. A shocked Kate begins to have doubts about Sergei when a girl with connections to Ukrainian human trafficking ring is murdered near the hotel where Sergei is staying. Megan's autopsy reveals the girl was pregnant, and her baby had been removed via a crude C-section. Victims: Oksana Svetlova; Murderers: Arco Starkovich; Etta Starkovich
36	7	"Skin and Bones"	Michael Grossman	Alexi Hawley	April 2, 2013	308	8.56
During a murder investigation, a man goes into a rage and bites Tommy. When a man in a similar state attacks a city bus patron, Megan turns to the new health commissioner Charlie Stafford (Luke Perry reprising his season 2 role), for help uncovering the truth behind strange rabies cases. Victims: Melanie Summer (murdered); Seth Boylan - (infected transplant times 2); Norman Chen - (infected transplant); Brian Ellis - (harvested); Michael Finley - (harvested); Shawn Asher - (alive); Murderers: Mason Geary
37	8	"Doubting Tommy"	Michael Grossman	Matthew L. Lewis	April 9, 2013	309	8.98
Megan finally accepts a date with Tommy. She leaves the dinner-bar rather than go home with Tommy, but reconsiders and goes back inside, only to find Tommy talking to a young woman. The next day, Megan arrives at the scene of the same young woman's murder, and finds Tommy covered in blood. As evidence piles up against Tommy, Megan tries to ignore her doubts and prove his innocence. Victims: Jason Banning; Skylar Green; Murderers: James Lawson
38	9	"Disappearing Act"	Sam Hill	Christopher Murphey	April 16, 2013	310	8.94
A wealthy fund manager (Christopher McDonald), on trial for defrauding investors out of a billion dollars, is kidnapped while leaving the courthouse and apparently murdered. During the kidnapping, a female protester outside the courthouse is run down by the getaway car, and her autopsy provides surprising clues. Megan gets closer to discovering the truth about her father. Victims: Jennifer Sanchez; Murderers: John Anderson/ Doctor Colin Olsson; Gerry Roberts
39	10	"Committed"	Eric Laneuville	Allen MacDonald	April 23, 2013	311	9.35
Joan refuses to let Megan have her father's body exhumed to examine. Shortly after, a schizophrenic teen is murdered at a mental institution. The institution's head doctor (Craig Bierko) comes under suspicion when he obstructs the investigation. Megan and Tommy are provided a clue by a young inmate named Darby (Hannah Leigh), who believes she was the intended target because the killer she witnessed is the same man that her mother hired to kill her younger sister years ago. When the mother (Sharon Lawrence) staunchly denies the accusations, Megan lets her feelings for the "silenced young girl" cloud her objectivity, and she takes the girl's side. Victims: Renee Caldwell; Beth Stone; Murderers: Darby Stone
40	11	"Dark City"	John Terlesky	Diane Ademu-John	May 7, 2013	312	8.24
When a plane crashes in Philadelphia due to a crazed U.S. Marshall opening fire while aloft, the entire team of Megan, Kate, Tommy, Adam, Curtis, Ethan, Riley and Stafford must go into disaster mode. Because the crash hit the city's main power grid, Megan must conduct autopsies on the victims during frequent blackouts. Things get further complicated when someone cuts the power feed in the building's backup generator and the body of one of the crash victims goes missing. Meanwhile, Tommy and Riley are in a serious car accident while trying to investigate the area where the plane's tail section landed. Victims: Tom Westphall; Air Marshall John Davies; Carla Mendez; Murderers: Pam Jacks; Air Marshall John Davies; Alex Jacks; Note: Air Marshall John Davies was both the murderer and victim.
41	12	"Breakout"	Milan Cheylov	Krystal Houghton Ziv	May 14, 2013	303	8.60
Robert Riley (Kenneth Mitchell), an inmate convicted of murdering his lover, violently escapes from a prison transport van and becomes a dangerous fugitive on the run in Philadelphia. He holds a list with names on it, including DA Russell, Megan, and two others. Soon another man turns up dead, and is revealed to be a witness who testified against Riley at trial. Megan must dig deeper into the original case (in which she herself presented evidence that incriminated Riley), when Riley corners her and insists that he is innocent and being framed. Suspicion begins to fall on Emmett Harrington (Alan Dale), a well-to-do area businessman who was married to the original murder victim, when evidence surfaces that two witnesses in the Riley trial received six-figure sums from Harrington's Cayman Islands account. When Megan gets the body of Harrington's former spouse exhumed, Kate finds something that Megan missed during the original autopsy. Victims: Caroline Harrington; Marcus Webb; Murderers: Stacey Harrington
42	13	"Daddy Issues"	John Terlesky	Corey Miller	May 28, 2013	313	7.64
Megan's father's exhumation is granted and she is shocked to find the coffin empty. Megan later finds a key that unlocks a secret compartment in her father's old study which holds a missing medical file for a young woman named Lindsay Pratt who was murdered the day before her father died by a serial killer named Earl Brown (Kurtwood Smith). Brown, however, denies killing Lindsay Pratt. Since he is already serving life for killing many others, he has no reason to lie. Megan and Tommy visit the retired detective who investigated the Earl Brown murders, Glenn Fitz (Jonathan Banks). He's positive Brown killed Lindsay, but Megan isn't so sure because Lindsay was killed in a different way. After Fitz is shot and Megan discovers that the recent dead body Kate is reconstructing was Fitz's former partner, Megan rushes to tell Tommy the news but instead finds Chief Martin. On a drive to the medical examiner's office, Chief Martin pulls out a gun revealing that she was the one who killed Lindsay Pratt (in a jealous rage). She also killed Megan's father and all the others to cover up any loose ends, and says that Megan is the only loose end left. Just as Chief Martin is about to shoot Megan, Trent Marsh steps in and shoots Chief Martin, saving Megan's life. In the end, Megan lets Tommy know that she's held the past against him for far too long, and they finally are together. Victims: Doctor David Hunt - 35 years ago (Megan's Dad); Lindsay Pratt; Detective Arthur Wilcox; Detective Glenn Fitz; Chief Angela Martin; Murderers: Chief Angela Martin; Trent Marsh; Earl Brown; Note: Chief Angela Martin killed Megan's dad 35 years ago before the pilot of the show. She was both the murderer for a long time and now a victim.

== Ratings ==
=== Live ratings ===
No. in series	No. in season	Episode	Air date	Time slot (ET)	Rating/Share (18–49)	Viewers (m)	Viewership rank
30	1	"Abducted, Part 1"	February 19, 2013	Tuesdays; 10:00 P.M.	1.2/3	6.75	—N/a
31	2	"Abducted, Part 2"	February 26, 2013	Tuesdays; 10:00 P.M.	1.2/3	6.37	—N/a
32	3	"Lost Souls"	March 5, 2013	Tuesdays; 10:00 P.M.	1.3/4	6.59	—N/a
33	4	"Mob Mentality"	March 12, 2013	Tuesdays; 10:00 P.M.	1.2/3	6.60	25
34	5	"Eye for an Eye"	March 19, 2013	Tuesdays; 10:00 P.M.	1.5/4	8.42	21
35	6	"Fallen Angel"	March 26, 2013	Tuesdays; 10:00 P.M.	1.6/5	9.59	12
36	7	"Skin and Bone"	April 2, 2013	Tuesdays; 10:00 P.M.	1.4/4	8.56	24
37	8	"Doubting Tommy"	April 9, 2013	Tuesdays; 10:00 P.M.	1.4/4	8.98	21
38	9	"Disappearing Act"	April 16, 2013	Tuesdays; 10:00 P.M.	1.4/4	8.94	17
39	10	"Committed"	April 23, 2013	Tuesdays; 10:00 P.M.	1.6/4	9.35	17
40	11	"Dark City"	May 7, 2013	Tuesdays; 10:00 P.M.	1.4/2	8.24	TBA
41	12	"Breakout"	May 14, 2013	Tuesdays; 10:00 P.M.	1.4/4	8.60	TBA
42	13	"Daddy Issues"	May 28, 2013	Tuesdays; 10:00 P.M.	1.2/3	7.64	TBA

=== Live + 7 Day (DVR) ratings ===
No. in series	No. in season	Episode	Air date	Time slot (ET)	18–49 rating increase	Viewers (millions) increase	Total 18-49	Total viewers (millions)	Ref
30	1	"Abducted, Part 1"	February 19, 2013	Tuesdays; 10:00 P.M.	0.6	2.56	1.8	9.31	
31	2	"Abducted, Part 2"	February 26, 2013	Tuesdays; 10:00 P.M.	0.7	2.83	1.9	9.20	
32	3	"Lost Souls"	March 5, 2013	Tuesdays; 10:00 P.M.	0.6	2.85	1.9	9.44	
33	4	"Mob Mentality"	March 12, 2013	Tuesdays; 10:00 P.M.	0.7	3.01	1.9	9.62	
34	5	"Eye for an Eye"	March 19, 2013	Tuesdays; 10:00 P.M.	0.7	3.08	2.2	11.50	
35	6	"Fallen Angel"	March 26, 2013	Tuesdays; 10:00 P.M.	0.7	2.93	2.3	12.53	
36	7	"Skin and Bones"	April 2, 2013	Tuesdays; 10:00 P.M.	0.6	2.43	2.0	10.98	
37	8	"Doubting Tommy"	April 9, 2013	Tuesdays; 10:00 P.M.	0.6	2.65	2.0	11.63	
38	9	"Disappearing Act"	April 16, 2013	Tuesdays; 10:00 P.M.	0.7	2.79	2.1	11.73	
39	10	"Committed"	April 23, 2013	Tuesdays; 10:00 P.M.	TBA	TBA	TBA	TBA	TBA
40	11	"Dark City"	May 7, 2013	Tuesdays; 10:00 P.M.	TBA	TBA	TBA	TBA	TBA
41	12	"Breakout"	May 14, 2013	Tuesdays; 10:00 P.M.	TBA	TBA	TBA	TBA	TBA
42	13	"Daddy Issues"	May 28, 2013	Tuesdays; 10:00 P.M.	TBA	TBA	TBA	TBA	TBA
