= Nancy Miller =

American TV writer and producer

Nancy Miller is an American TV writer and producer. Her production company is Paid Our Dues Productions. In 2008, she signed an overall deal with Fox Television Studios.

== Credits ==
- Against The Wall
- Saving Grace
- Under
- The Closer
- Threat Matrix
- CSI: Miami
- Any Day Now
- Leaving L.A.
- Profiler
- The Monroes
- The Marshal
- The Cosby Mysteries
- Against The Grain
- The Round Table
- Law & Order
- Nashville

== Awards and nominations ==
- Gracie Allen Awards
- Writers Guild of America Award
