= Goin' South =

1978 film directed by Jack Nicholson

- Theatrical release poster
- Directed by: Jack Nicholson
- Written by: John Herman Shaner; Al Ramrus; Charles Shyer; Alan Mandel
- Produced by: Harry Gittes; Harold Schneider
- Starring: Jack Nicholson; Mary Steenburgen; John Belushi; Christopher Lloyd
- Cinematography: Néstor Almendros
- Edited by: John Fitzgerald Beck; Richard Chew
- Music by: Perry Botkin Jr.; Van Dyke Parks
- Distributed by: Paramount Pictures
- Release date: October 6, 1978
- Running time: 105 minutes 109 minutes (DVD version)
- Country: United States
- Language: English
- Box office: $7,435,671 (US)

Goin' South is a 1978 American western comedy film directed by and starring Jack Nicholson, with Mary Steenburgen, Christopher Lloyd, John Belushi, Richard Bradford, Veronica Cartwright, Danny DeVito and Ed Begley Jr.

== Plot ==
Henry Lloyd Moon is a third-rate outlaw in the late 1860s, a convicted bank robber, horse thief and cattle thief. He is sentenced to be hanged in Longhorn, Texas, to the glee of the locals who gather to watch his execution. A local ordinance dictates that a man convicted of any crime other than murder may be freed, if a lady will marry him and take responsibility for his good behavior. Well aware of the ordinance, many of the townswomen scrutinize Moon as he mounts the gallows.

An elderly woman offers to marry him, but dies on the spot immediately. As Moon is dragged back to the gallows, Julia Tate, a headstrong, genteel virgin from the Southern United States, agrees to marry and take charge of him. She weds Moon, intending only to use him as labor in a secret gold mine under her property. This slowly evolves into a shaky partnership as he gains her trust, then develops into much more. Her chastity and his desire to consummate the marriage become a source of friction. Although they do spend the night together in a cave, she regrets her decision the following morning, and yells at Moon. In anger, Moon ties her to the bed and tries to flee town. He is brought back by the sheriff's men, where Julia covers for him. The two patch things up, realizing they truly care for each other.

When a cave-in at the mine uncover a significant vein of gold, the two negotiate as business partners, with Moon to receive 25% of the gold. They store the gold, in a small chest, in the town's bank, claiming it is a collection of (heavy) figurines. Julia later increases Moon's share to 50%, admitting that they are more than mere business partners.

Moon's old gang complicates matters when they arrive at Julia's home and introduce the teetotalling Julia to intoxicating beverages. They discover that Julia and Moon are mining gold. Julia gets jealous when Hermine – a member of the gang – tries (unsuccessfully) to renew a past sexual relation with Moon. Julia does not believe that Moon rejected her advances and throws him out. Moon then schemes with his gang to betray Julia and steal the gold in two days, wanting to extract more gold from the mine .

The next day, Julia narrowly averts death in a more severe cave-in. The incident makes them realize how intensely they care for each other. The day of the planned robbery, Moon goes to the bank before it opens and steals the chest to protect it from his gang only to finding that Julia had filled the chest with stones and is gone. She has sold her farm to the railroad, and already left town with the gold. Moon chases down her stagecoach and holds it up at gun point. Julia and Moon decide to take their gold and follow Moon's dream of opening a cantina in Mexico, where the Texas authorities can't touch him. Together they start walking to Mexico.

== Cast ==
- Jack Nicholson as Henry Moon
- Mary Steenburgen as Julia Tate
- Christopher Lloyd as Deputy Towfield
- John Belushi as Deputy Hector
- Richard Bradford as Sheriff Kyle
- Danny DeVito as "Hog"
- Veronica Cartwright as Hermine
- Jeff Morris as "Big Abe"
- Gerald H. Reynolds as Polty
- Tracey Walter as Coogan
- Ed Begley, Jr. as "Whitey"
- Georgia Schmidt as Florence

== Production ==
The film was co-written by John Herman Shaner and produced by Harry Gittes, both longtime friends of Jack Nicholson from his early days in Hollywood.

Goin' South marks the film debut of Mary Steenburgen, who had been a waitress in New York hoping to break into acting and after being turned down repeatedly for film roles; it launched her career in Hollywood. Christopher Lloyd, who worked with Nicholson on One Flew Over the Cuckoo's Nest, plays Deputy Towfield. Lloyd and Steenburgen reunited 12 years later as love interests in Robert Zemeckis' Back to the Future Part III.

Goin' South was John Belushi's second film (after Animal House).

It was the second of three films directed by Nicholson. The first was 1971's Drive, He Said and the third was the Chinatown sequel The Two Jakes, released in 1990. This marks the first film in which Nicholson appears as the primary actor while directing. He does not appear in Drive, He Said, but did star in and direct The Two Jakes.

The film was shot in Durango, Mexico, and Texas.

== Reception ==
Goin' South was not a hit upon release in 1978 with critics or audiences. On Rotten Tomatoes, it has a 69% approval rating based on 16 reviews, with an average rating of 6.6/10. On Metacritic, it holds a 52 score based on 9 reviews, indicating "mixed or average" reviews.

Variety wrote: "Jack Nicholson playing Gabby Hayes is interesting, even amusing at times, but Hayes was never a leading man, which Goin' South desperately needs," adding that the "largely uninteresting" relationship between the Nicholson and Steenburgen characters "never jells, as Nicholson continues to sputter and chomp, acting more like her grandfather than a handsome roué out to overcome her virginity."

Gene Siskel of the Chicago Tribune gave the film two-and-a-half stars out of four and stated that "Jack Nicholson may be cute, but two hours of cute he is not ... Nicholson as director takes his own sweet time, giving us scene after scene of him acting silly. My guess is that he doesn't think he is being indulgent with the character, because half the time he puts the character down. But the result is the same: Jack and more Jack. The film could use more of John Belushi, the Animal House star, wasted here in a walk-on as a fat Mexican deputy sheriff. What Goin' South could also use is a credible villain."

Charles Champlin of the Los Angeles Times was positive, writing: "There ain't much to it, to drop into the cackling vernacular of the movie, but what there is, is choice. Nicholson, directing for the first time since Drive, He Said, has a fine way with actors, including himself, and he sets and sustains a tone that is larger than life but not so broad as to be only farcically foolish."

Gary Arnold of The Washington Post called the film "a stupefying throwback" that "expires right before your eyes from a terminal case of the feebles," with Nicholson and Steenburgen "a bust" as a romantic comedy team. David Ansen of Newsweek wrote: "Droll, sweet-tempered and lackadaisical, it's a shaggy-dog story with Nicholson playing the shaggy dog ... Unfortunately, after a highly inventive first half, the tale gets mighty thin, and the waifish Steenburgen doesn't have enough range to carry her share of the romantic burden. Just when Goin' South needs to build, the pace gets poky and the wit becomes mere whimsy. A little less coyness, and a lot more John Belushi (as a Mexican deputy), would have helped."

Lawrence O'Toole wrote in Maclean's: "Every time Nicholson beams his gin-soaked grin into the movie, Goin' South is momentarily salvaged; but everything and everybody outside him seem to atrophy in the sun. It's his second crack at directing...and he's not untalented, yet the selection of shots doesn't have the rhythmic grace to pull us into the wispy narrative." Pauline Kael of The New Yorker stated: "Nicholson's prankish performance dominates the movie, and with his prankishness also coming out in the casting and the directing, the movie hasn't any stabilizing force; there's nothing to balance what he's doing—no one with a straitjacket."

William P. Luce of The New York Times wrote: "If you haven't heard of this 24‐year‐old waitress, don't worry, practically nobody else has either except for Jack Nicholson. But Mr. Nicholson is quite enough in this case. He has taken Miss Steenburgen out from under her trays of crepes and cast her as his leading lady in his new Paramount picture, Goin’ South." Stanley Kauffmann of The New Republic wrote that Goin' South "is boring after about the sixth minute, an especially irritating bore because there's an idea in it for a good Nicholson picture". Mary Steenburgen earned a nomination for the Golden Globe Award for New Star of the Year – Actress.
