= Lorraine Toussaint =

Trinidadian actress (born 1960)

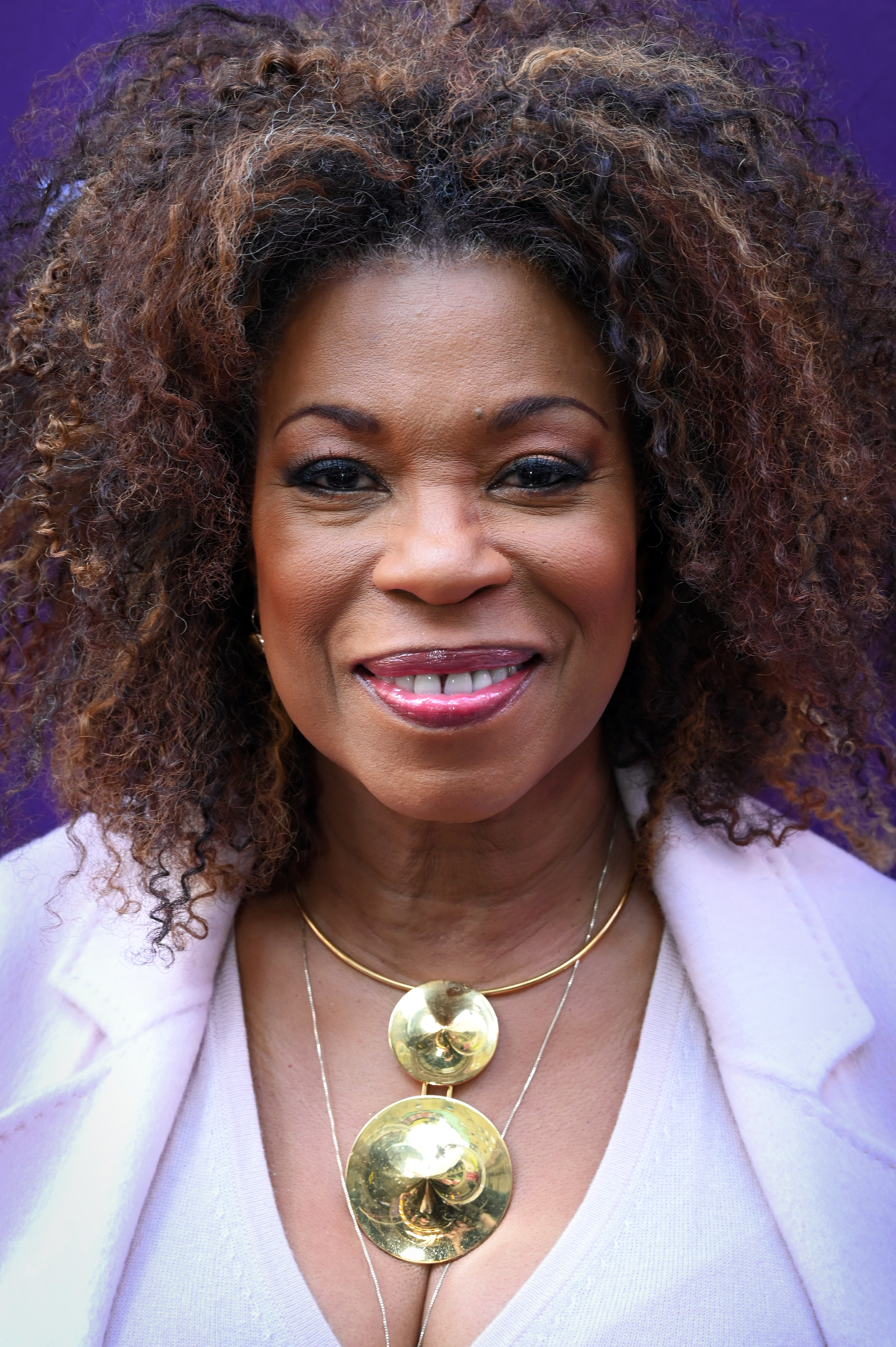
- Toussaint in 2026
- Born: 4 April 1960 (age 66); Trinidad and Tobago
- Education: Juilliard School (BFA)
- Occupation: Actress
- Years active: 1981–present
- Spouse: Michael Tomlinson (m. 2017; div. 2019)
- Children: 1

Lorraine Toussaint (/tuːˈsɑːnt/ born 4 April 1960) is a Trinidadian actress. She is the recipient of various accolades, including a Black Reel Award, a Critics' Choice Television Award and a Screen Actors Guild Award.

Toussaint began her career in theatre, before supporting performances in films such as Breaking In (1989), Hudson Hawk (1991), and Dangerous Minds (1995). As a lead actress, she is best known for her role as Rene Jackson in the critically acclaimed Lifetime television drama series Any Day Now, from 1998 to 2002, and her recurring role as defense attorney Shambala Green in the NBC legal drama Law & Order. She later appeared as a regular cast member in the NBC police procedural Crossing Jordan (2002–03) and the TNT crime drama Saving Grace (2007–10).

Toussaint received critical acclaim and an Independent Spirit Award nomination for her performance in the 2012 drama film Middle of Nowhere, written and directed by Ava DuVernay. In 2014, she played the role of Yvonne "Vee" Parker, the main antagonist in the second season of the Netflix comedy-drama series Orange Is the New Black, for which she received critical acclaim and a Critics' Choice Television Award for Best Supporting Actress in a Drama Series. She also played the role of Amelia Boynton Robinson in the 2014 historical drama film Selma, directed by Ava DuVernay. Toussaint later co-starred in the ABC fantasy-drama series Forever (2014–15), the Fox comedy-drama Rosewood (2015–17), the AMC drama Into the Badlands (2018–19), NBC drama The Village (2019) and CBS crime drama The Equalizer (2021–2025). Additionally, she appeared in films Fast Color (2018), Scary Stories to Tell in the Dark (2019), The Glorias (2020) and Concrete Cowboy (2020).

== Early life ==
Toussaint was born in Trinidad and Tobago. In an interview she said:

I grew up under the British system, which I think is horrific for children — very, very strict — a system that did not recognize children as being individuals. You were small animals earning the right to be human. Childhood for me then felt extraordinarily powerless, and as an artistic child who learned in alternative ways, it was hell. I was beaten regularly... A good child was a fearful child, and I was a very, very, good little girl, which meant I lived in a world of silent, dark terror most of the time.

Her mother was a teacher, and she brought Toussaint to live in Brooklyn, New York City, New York, in the late 1960s.

Toussaint graduated from Manhattan's High School of Performing Arts in 1978. She then attended the Juilliard School's drama division as a member of Group 11 (1978–1982), where her classmates in 1982 included Megan Gallagher, Penny Johnson Jerald, Jack Kenny, and Jack Stehlin. Toussaint graduated from Juilliard with a Bachelor of Fine Arts degree.

== Career ==
=== Early career ===
After graduating, Toussaint began her career as a Shakespearean actress, before tackling screen acting in television and film. Notable stage roles include Hippolyta in Liviu Ciulei's production of A Midsummer Night's Dream at the Guthrie Theater, Tamara in the world premiere of Toni Morrison's Dreaming Emmett at Capital Repertory Theatre, the American premiere of Two Fish in the Sky at the Phoenix Theatre, and an appearance at Tadashi Suzuki's Toga Festival in Japan.In 1994, Touissant starred as Yelena in the Antaeus Theatre Company's inaugural production of Anton Chekhov's The Wood Demon at the Mark Taper Forum in Los Angeles.

Toussaint made her screen debut in 1983. In 1986, she portrayed the widow of a man shot and killed by Boston police in the television film A Case of Deadly Force, based on the book by Lawrence O'Donnell. She later had a recurring role of Vera Williams in the ABC daytime soap opera, One Life to Live. While maintaining her stage career, she appeared in guest starring roles in series such as 227 and Law & Order (in a recurring role as defense lawyer Shambala Green). She also acted in a number of television films in the 1990s.

Toussaint made her film debut in the female lead role opposite Burt Reynolds in the crime comedy Breaking In (1989). The film received positive reviews from critics, but flopped in box office. In 1991, she appeared opposite Bruce Willis in Hudson Hawk, and later co-starred alongside Michelle Pfeiffer in Dangerous Minds (1995). She also appeared in films Point of No Return (1993), Mother's Boys (1994), and Black Dog (1998). On television, Toussaint had regular roles in short-lived series Bodies of Evidence (CBS, 1992), Where I Live (ABC, 1993), Amazing Grace (NBC, 1995), and Leaving L.A. (ABC, 1997).

=== 1998–2011 ===
Toussaint had her biggest and leading role alongside Annie Potts in the Lifetime first original television drama series, Any Day Now, starring as Rene Jackson, a successful African-American lawyer. The series received critical acclaim for both lead actresses' performances as well as the show's script writing but never attained standout ratings. In 2001, Toussaint was a promising contender for a Primetime Emmy Award for Outstanding Lead Actress in a Drama Series category, though she did not receive a nomination. She was nominated five times for an NAACP Image Award for Outstanding Actress in a Drama Series for her role. Any Day Now ended after four seasons and 88 episodes.

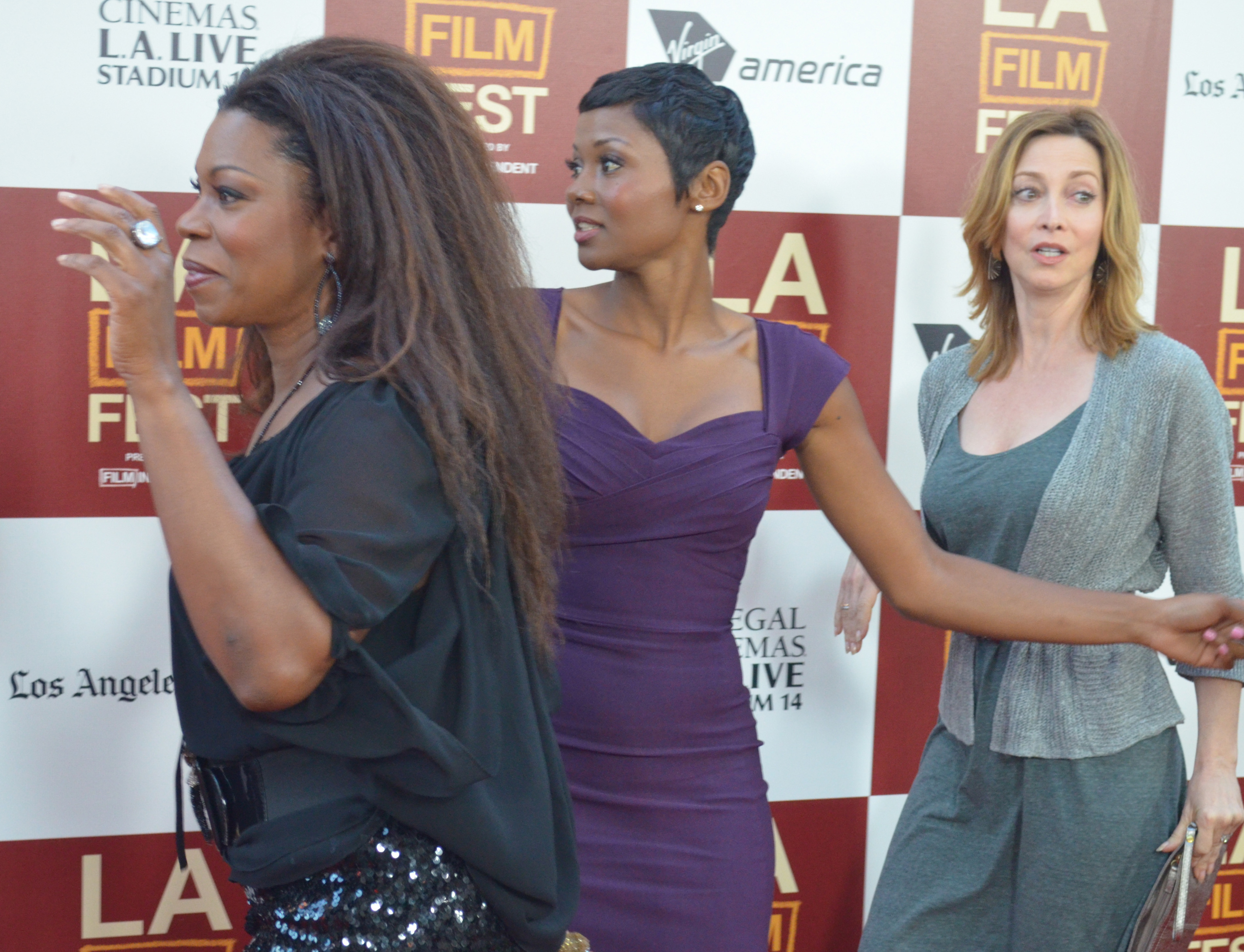
Toussaint with Emayatzy Corinealdi and Sharon Lawrence at a promotional event for Middle of Nowhere in 2012

From 2002 to 2004, Toussaint had a regular role playing Dr. Elaine Duchamps in the NBC police procedural, Crossing Jordan. In later years, she guest-starred on Frasier, Judging Amy, The Closer, CSI: Crime Scene Investigation, ER, and NCIS. She also was a regular, opposite Holly Hunter, in the TNT crime drama Saving Grace as Capt. Kate Perry from 2007 to 2010. She had a recurring role as Amelia 'Yoga' Bluman in the ABC comedy series Ugly Betty in 2006, and as Bird Merriweather in the NBC drama Friday Night Lights (2009–11). Toussaint also appeared as Jamie Foxx's character's mother in the 2009 drama The Soloist.

=== 2012–present ===
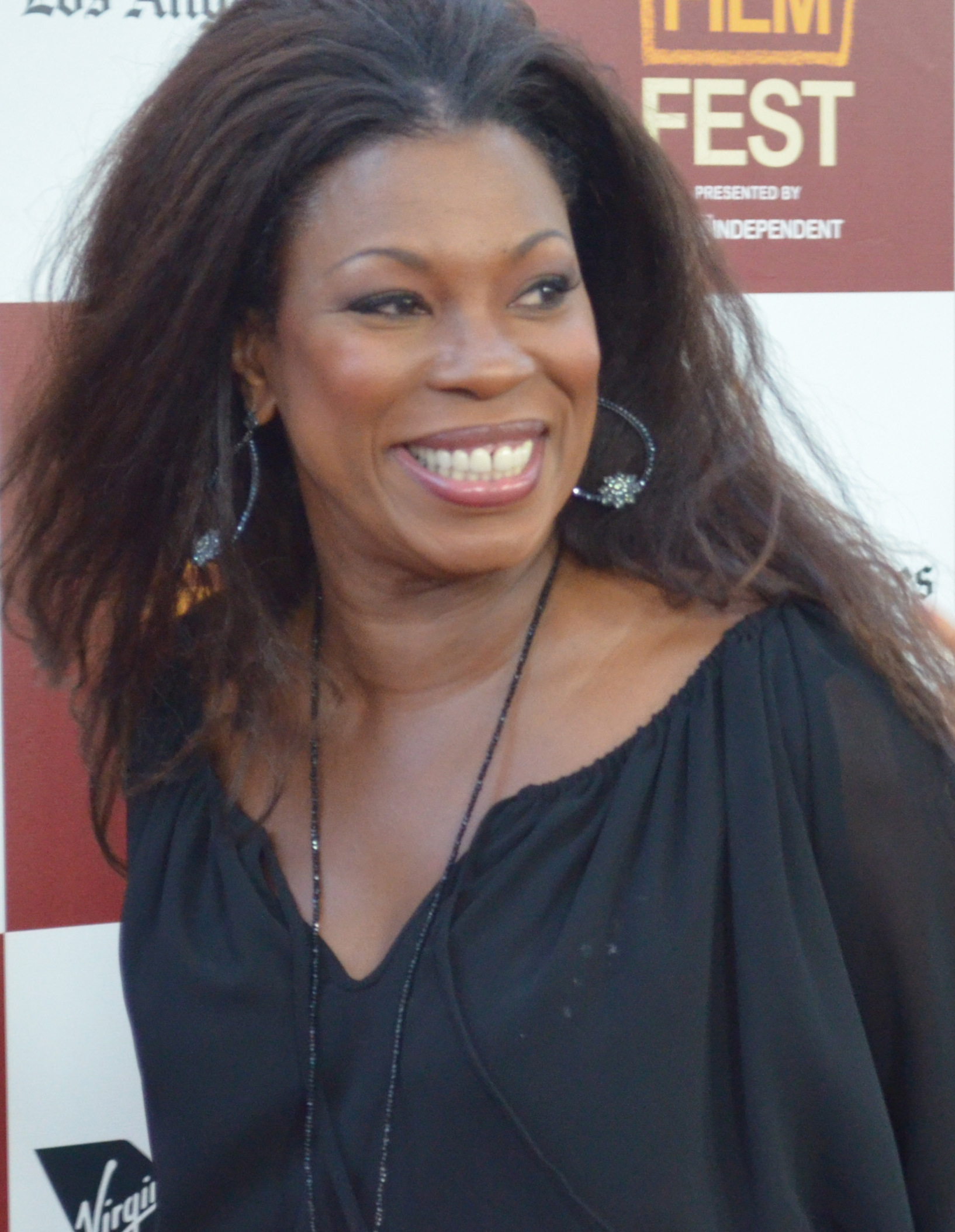
Toussaint in 2012

In 2012, Toussaint received critical acclaim and was nominated for an Independent Spirit Award for Best Supporting Female for her performance as a hardworking mother who struggles to support her daughter's (Emayatzy Corinealdi) decision to put her life on hold to support her incarcerated husband (Omari Hardwick), in Middle of Nowhere, a drama film written and directed by Ava DuVernay. Toussaint was a promising contender for an Academy Award for Best Supporting Actress category in 2013, but she did not receive a nomination.

In 2012, she guest-starred in Shonda Rhimes' dramas Grey's Anatomy (as a doctor) and Scandal (as a bereaved and betrayed pastor's wife). In 2013, she had a recurring role in season 3 of Dana Delany's series Body of Proof as villainous police chief Angela Martin. Later in 2013, she joined the cast of ABC Family drama series, The Fosters, as Sherri Saums character's mother. This marked the first time she reunited on-screen with Annie Potts since the finale of Any Day Now in 2002.

Toussaint starred in the second season of Netflix's original comedy-drama series, Orange Is the New Black in 2014. She played the role of Yvonne "Vee" Parker, the main antagonist of season two, described as a street-tough inmate who returns to jail after a long stint as a drug dealer. Her performance earned critical acclaim. In the series Toussaint, in her 50s, appeared nude on-screen for the first time in her career. For her performance, she won the Critics' Choice Television Award for Best Supporting Actress in a Drama Series and the Screen Actors Guild Award for Outstanding Performance by an Ensemble in a Comedy Series. In February 2016, Vee was ranked 28th on Rolling Stone's list of "40 Greatest TV Villains of All Time".

In 2014, Toussaint co-starred in Ava DuVernay's historical drama film Selma, playing Amelia Boynton Robinson, a leading civil rights activist who had a key role in efforts that led to passage of the Voting Rights Act, and who was the first African-American woman in Alabama to run for Congress. That same year, she was cast in the ABC fantasy-drama series Forever opposite Ioan Gruffudd and Alana de la Garza. The series was canceled after a single season. Toussaint co-starred in the comedy film Xmas, directed and written by Jonathan Levine, which was released on November 25, 2015. Also in 2015, she co-starred in Runaway Island and Sophie and the Rising Sun. Later that year, Toussaint was cast in Coco, a drama produced by Lionsgate, alongside rapper Azealia Banks. In June 2015, she joined the cast of the Fox comedy-drama Rosewood in the series regular role of the titular character's mother.

In March 2016, Toussaint was cast in her role as defense attorney Shambala Green, a role she originated on Law & Order in 1990, on the NBC legal drama Chicago Justice, that aired a backdoor pilot in Chicago P.D.. On August 14, 2017, it was announced that Toussaint would join as a series regular in the third season of Into the Badlands. She played the role of Cressida, a self-styled Prophetess in season 3.

In 2019, Toussaint starred in the NBC limited drama series The Village. The series was canceled after one season. She later starred in the superhero film Fast Color opposite Gugu Mbatha-Raw and played the role of Louise "Lou Lou" Baptiste in the horror film Scary Stories to Tell in the Dark produced by Guillermo del Toro. The following year, she played feminist, civil rights advocate and activist Florynce Kennedy in the biographical film The Glorias directed by Julie Taymor. The film premiered at the Sundance Film Festival on January 26, 2020. Later, she was cast opposite Idris Elba in the drama film Concrete Cowboy. Also in 2020, Toussaint was cast as Viola "Aunt Vi" Lascombe in the CBS reboot of The Equalizer starring Queen Latifah.

== Personal life ==
Toussaint has one daughter named Samara. One of Toussaint's grandparents was from Martinique. She had a blog. Toussaint married Michael Tomlinson in August 2017 but they divorced almost two years later in 2019.

Toussaint was raised Catholic but has since explored other religions, such as Hinduism and Buddhism.

== Filmography ==
=== Film ===
Year	Title	Role	Notes
1989	Breaking In	Delphine the Hooker	
1991	Hudson Hawk	Almond Joy	
1993	Point of No Return	Beth	
1993	Mother's Boys	Robert's Associate	
1994	Bleeding Hearts	Enid Sheperd	
1995	Dangerous Minds	Irene Roberts	
1996	Psalms from the Underground	-	Short
1997	The Spittin' Image	-	Short
1998	Black Dog	Avery	
1998	Jaded	Carol Broker	
2000	The Sky Is Falling	Janie	
2007	Rwanda Rising	Berne Mukaniwisi (voice)	
2008	The Gold Lunch	Judge	Short
2009	The Soloist	Flo Ayers	
2012	Knife Fight	Brenda Davis	
2012	Middle of Nowhere	Ruth	
2014	Ask Me Anything	Dr. Sherman	
2014	Selma	Amelia Boynton Robinson	
2015	Runaway Island	Naomi Holloway	
2015	The Night Before	Mrs. Roberts	
2016	Sophie and the Rising Sun	Salome Whitmore	
2017	Girls Trip	Herself	
2017	Love Beats Rhymes	Nichelle	
2018	Fast Color	Bo	
2018	Sprinter	Donna	
2018	A Conversation: Anne Frank Meets God	God (voice)	Short
2019	Scary Stories to Tell in the Dark	Louise "Lou Lou" Baptiste	
2020	The Glorias	Florynce Kennedy	
2020	Concrete Cowboy	Nessie	
2023	Nimona	Queen Valerin (voice)	
2024	Big City Greens the Movie: Spacecation	Rashida Remington (voice)	
TBA	Silent Retreat		Post-production

=== Television ===
Year	Title	Role	Notes
1983	The Face of Rage	Stendah	Television film
1986	A Case of Deadly Force	Pat Bowden	Television film
1988	One Life to Live	Vera Williams	Regular Cast
1989	A Man Called Hawk	Emily Howell	Episode: "Hear No Evil"
1990	Common Ground	Alva	Television film
1990	227	Monica Patton	Episode: "Nightmare on 227"
1990	Nasty Boys	Dr. Chanel Cory	Episode: "Kill or Be Killed: Part 1"
1990–94	Law & Order	Shambala Green	Recurring cast: seasons 1 & 3, guest: season 4
1991	Daddy	Judge Lorraine	Television film
1992	Tequila and Bonetti	Big Marie Touissant	Episode: "The Rose Cadillac"
1992	Trial: The Price of Passion	Nancy Goodpaster	Television film
1992	Bodies of Evidence	Dr. Mary Rocket	Episode: "Afternoon Delights"
1992	Red Dwarf	Captain Lorraine Tau	Television film
1993	Queen	Joyce	Episode: "Episode #1.3"
1993	Lies and Lullabies	Florence Crawford	Television film
1993	Class of '61	Sarah	Television film
1993	The Sinbad Show	Mrs. Payton	Episode: "Pilot"
1993	Where I Live	Marie St. Martin	Main role
1994	A Time to Heal	Zelda	Television film
1994	M.A.N.T.I.S.	Denise Copeland	Episode: "Fire in the Heart"
1995	Bless This House	Lorraine	Episode: "A Woman's Work Is Never Done"
1995	Amazing Grace	Yvonne Price	Main role
1995	Murder One	Margaret Stratton	2 episodes
1995	It Was Him or Us	Lt. Lorraine Washington	Television film
1996	America's Dream	Philomena Jonz	Television film
1996	Nightjohn	Dealey	Television film
1996	If These Walls Could Talk	Shameeka Webb	Television film
1996	Mr. & Mrs. Smith	Dr. Avery Cotter	Episode: "The Coma Episode"
1996	The Cherokee Kid	Mama Annie Turner	Television film
1996	Dark Skies	Eda Mae Tillman	Episode: "We Shall Overcome"
1997	Promised Land	Linda Paxton	Episode: "Running Scared"
1997	Leaving L.A.	Dr. Claudia Chan	Main role
1998	Blackout Effect	Kim Garfield	Television film
1998	Nothing Sacred	Lorraine Hamilton	Episode: "Signs and Words"
1998	Cracker	Tisha Watlington	Episode: "If: Part 1 & 2"
1998	C-16: FBI	Marsha Fontaine	Episode: "My Brother's Keeper"
1998–2002	Any Day Now	Rene Jackson	Main role
2002	Static Shock	Dr. Franklin (voice)	Episode: "Jimmy"
2002–03	Crossing Jordan	Dr. Elaine Duchamps	Main cast: season 2
2003	This Far by Faith	Narrator	Episode: "There Is a River"
2003	Law & Order	Shambala Green	Episode: "Identity"
2003–04	Threat Matrix	Carina Wright	Recurring role
2004	Frasier	Nurse Betty Toussaint	Episode: "Boo!"
2005	Their Eyes Were Watching God	Pearl Stone	Television film
2005	Judging Amy	Eileen Stayman	Episode: "The New Normal"
2005	The Closer	Deputy D.A. Patrice Powell	2 episodes
2005	Numb3rs	Medical Examiner	Episode: "Bones of Contention"
2006	3 lbs	Della	Episode: "Unaired Pilot"
2006–07	CSI: Crime Scene Investigation	Cynthia James	Recurring cast: Season 7
2007	Ugly Betty	Amelia 'Yoga' Bluman	Recurring role: season 2
2007–10	Saving Grace	Capt. Kate Perry	Main role
2008	ER	Yolanda	Episode: "Believe the Unseen"
2009	Numb3rs	Agent Terri Green	Episode: "Cover Me"
2009–11	Friday Night Lights	Birdie "Bird" Merriweather	Recurring role: season 4–5
2010	Three Rivers	Yolanda Moss	Episode: "Every Breath You Take"
2010	The Glades	Carol Watkins	Episode: "A Perfect Storm"
2011	NCIS	Deputy Director Donna Wolfson	Episode: "Defiance"
2011	Against the Wall	Officer Edie Marks	Episode: "Obsessed and Unwanted"
2012	Grey's Anatomy	Dr. Helen Fincher	Episode: "The Girl with No Name"
2012	The Finder	La Bruja	Episode: "Voodoo Undo"
2012	Drop Dead Diva	Prof. Ellen Daily	Episode: "Road Trip"
2012	The Secret Life of the American Teenager	Lorraine	Episode: "Holy Rollers"
2012	Scandal	Nancy Drake	Episode: "The Other Woman"
2012–14	The Young and the Restless	Dr. Watkins	Main role
2013	Body of Proof	Police Chief Angela Martin	Recurring role: Season 3
2013–17	The Fosters	Dana Adams	Recurring role
2014	Being Mary Jane	Aunt Toni	Episode: "The Huxtables Have Fallen"
2014	Orange Is the New Black	Yvonne "Vee" Parker	Recurring role: Season 2
2014–15	Forever	Lt. Joanna Reece	Main role
2015–17	Rosewood	Donna Rosewood	Main role
2016	The Real Housewives of Atlanta	Herself	Episode: "Shade for Days"
2016	Chicago P.D.	Shambala Green	Episode: "Justice"
2016	Black-ish	Aunt Alma Johnson	Episode: "Auntsgiving"
2017	Shots Fired	Carole Moore	Episode: "Hour Eight: Rock Bottom"
2018	Grace and Frankie	Rebecca	Episode: "The Death Stick"
2018–19	Into the Badlands	Cressida	Main role: season 3
2018–20	She-Ra and the Princesses of Power	Shadow Weaver/Light Spinner (voice)	Main role
2018–present	Big City Greens	Rashida Remington (voice)	Recurring role
2019	The Village	Patricia	Main role
2020	The Good Fight	Nia Rogers	Episode: "The Gang Offends Everyone"
2020–21	Your Honor	Judge Sarah LeBlanc	Recurring role: season 1
2021	Cinema Toast	Mother (voice)	Episode: "Kiss, Marry, Kill"
2021	Summer Camp Island	Emily Ghost (voice)	Episode: "The Emily Ghost Institute for Manners and Magical Etiquette"
2021	Star Wars: Visions	Masago (voice)	Episode: "Akakiri"
2021–25	The Equalizer	Viola "Aunt Vi" Lascombe	Main role
2022	Wolfboy and the Everything Factory	Forest Ancient (voice)	Episode: "We Search for Change"
2023	Great Performances	Herself/Gertrude	Episode: "Making Shakespeare: The First Folio"
2025	StuGo	Dr. Lullah (voice)	Main role
2025	All's Fair	Alberta Dome	2 episodes

=== Video games ===
Year	Title	Role
2004	World of Warcraft	High Sage Viryx
2014	World of Warcraft: Warlords of Draenor	High Sage Viryx
2015	King's Quest	Sphinx

== Awards and nominations ==
Year	Association	Category	Work	Result
1999	NAACP Image Award	Outstanding Actress in a Drama Series	Any Day Now	Nominated
1999	TV Guide Award	Best Actress in a Drama Series	Any Day Now	Nominated
1999	Viewers for Quality Television Award	Viewers for Quality Television Award for Outstanding Actress in a Drama Series	Any Day Now	Nominated
2000	National Bar Association Award	Wiley A. Branton Award	Any Day Now	Won
2000	NAACP Image Award	Outstanding Actress in a Drama Series	Any Day Now	Nominated
2001	NAACP Image Award	Outstanding Actress in a Drama Series	Any Day Now	Nominated
2002	NAACP Image Award	Outstanding Actress in a Drama Series	Any Day Now	Nominated
2003	NAACP Image Award	Outstanding Actress in a Drama Series	Any Day Now	Nominated
2008	LA Femme Filmmaker Award	Visionary Award		Won
2013	Film Independent Spirit Awards	Best Supporting Female	Middle of Nowhere	Nominated
2013	Black Reel Award	Best Supporting Actress	Middle of Nowhere	Nominated
2013	Black Reel Award	Best Ensemble	Middle of Nowhere	Nominated
2014	NewNowNext Award	Best New Television Actress	Orange Is the New Black	Nominated
2014	Washington D.C. Area Film Critics Association Award	Best Ensemble	Selma	Nominated
2014	Black Film Critics Circle Award	Best Ensemble	Selma	Won
2015	Critics' Choice Movie Award	Best Ensemble	Selma	Nominated
2015	NAACP Image Award	Outstanding Supporting Actress in a Comedy Series	Orange is the New Black	Nominated
2015	Screen Actors Guild Award	Outstanding Performance by an Ensemble in a Comedy Series	Orange is the New Black	Won
2015	Essence Black Women in Hollywood Award	Vanguard Award	Orange is the New Black	Won
2015	Black Reel Award	Best Ensemble	Selma	Won
2015	Critics' Choice Television Award	Best Supporting Actress in a Drama Series	Orange is the New Black	Won
2015	EWwy Awards	Best Supporting Actress in a Drama	Orange is the New Black	Nominated
2020	Chlotrudis Award	Best Supporting Actress	Fast Color	Won
2022	Black Reel Award	Outstanding Supporting Actress, Drama Series	The Equalizer	Nominated
