= Harry Gittes =

American film producer

- Born: May 6, 1936; Brookline, Massachusetts, U.S.
- Died: September 2, 2017 (aged 81); Los Angeles, California, U.S.
- Occupation: Film producer
- Spouse: Christine Cuddy
- Children: 2

Harry Gittes (May 6, 1936 - September 2, 2017) was an American film producer. He was known for collaborating with Jack Nicholson in such films as Drive, He Said (1971), Goin' South (1978) and About Schmidt (2002). Gittes was also the namesake of Nicholson's character in Chinatown (1974).

== Early life and education ==
Gittes was born on May 6, 1936, in Brookline, Massachusetts. He attended the University of Massachusetts at Amherst.

== Personal life and death ==
Gittes was married to lawyer Christine Cuddy and they had two children: Michael and Julia.

Gittes died of natural causes on September 2, 2017, in Los Angeles at age 81.

== Filmography ==
Year	Film	Notes
1969	Hey, Hey, Hey, It's Fat Albert	Producer
1971	Drive, He Said	Co-producer
1976	Harry and Walter Go to New York	Producer
1978	Goin' South	Producer
1982	Dangerous Company	Executive producer
1982	Timerider: The Adventure of Lyle Swann	Producer
1988	Little Nikita	Producer
1989	Breaking In	Producer
2002	About Schmidt	Producer
2004	The Girl Next Door	Producer
2017	Last Flag Flying	Executive producer, posthumous release
