= Runaway Island (2015 film) =

- Directed by: Dianne Houston
- Written by: Christopher Brandt
- Produced by: Allison Wilmarth; Gingi Rochelle
- Starring: Lorraine Toussaint; Aisha Hinds; Thomas Q. Jones
- Cinematography: Bruce Francis Cole
- Production company: G.R. Entertainment Group
- Release date: June 12, 2015 (ABFF)
- Country: United States
- Language: English

Runaway Island is a 2015 romantic drama film directed by Dianne Houston, written by Christopher Brandt, and starring Lorraine Toussaint, Aisha Hinds and Thomas Q. Jones. It tells the story of senator's widow Naomi Holloway (played by Toussaint), who comes to risk a second chance at love with a younger man.

Runaway Island was filmed during spring of 2015. It premiered at the American Black Film Festival in June, 2015.

== Cast ==
- Lorraine Toussaint as Naomi Holloway
- Aisha Hinds as Lara Cook-Nordholm
- Thomas Q. Jones as Raphael Burrows
- Erica Tazel as Vonda Hines
- A. Russell Andrews as Rev. Clinton Hines
- Leon Thomas III as Evan Holloway
- Tom Wright as Raymond Tepper
- Melanie Liburd as Kira Geoffries

== See also ==
- List of black films of the 2010s
