= Any Day Now (TV series) =

American drama series (1998–2002)

- Genre: Drama
- Created by: Nancy Miller; Deborah Joy LeVine
- Starring: Annie Potts; Lorraine Toussaint; Mae Middleton; Olivia Hack; Shari Dyon Perry; Maya Goodwin; Chris Mulkey
- Opening theme: "Any Day Now" performed by Lori Perry
- Composer: Susan Marder
- Country of origin: United States
- Original language: English
- No. of seasons: 4
- No. of episodes: 88

Production
- Running time: 60 min (approx)
- Production companies: Paid Our Dues Productions; Finnegan/Pinchuk Productions (1998–2000) (seasons 1–2); Spelling Entertainment Group

Original release
- Network: Lifetime
- Release: August 18, 1998 – March 10, 2002

Any Day Now is an American drama television series that aired on the Lifetime network from 1998 to 2002. Set in Birmingham, Alabama, Any Day Now explored issues around race and friendship and how they affect the lives of two devoted lifelong friends over the years—from the 1960s to the current day. The show stars Annie Potts and Lorraine Toussaint, portraying best friends since childhood, as they openly and honestly address events in their interracial community.

The show's title is taken from the 1962 song "Any Day Now", written by Burt Bacharach and Bob Hilliard. A version performed by Lori Perry served as the show's theme song.

== Setting ==
Any Day Now focuses on the lives and interactions of two female protagonists: Mary Elizabeth "M.E." O'Brien Sims (Potts) and Rene Jackson (Toussaint). The two had grown up as close friends in Birmingham, Alabama, in the 1960s during the peak of the Civil Rights Movement. However, their friendship ended when M.E. became pregnant and chose, despite Rene's disapproval, to keep the child, drop out of college, and marry her boyfriend, Colliar Sims.

More than twenty years later, M.E. and her husband still live in Birmingham, where they struggle to make ends meet. Their oldest son, Bobby, died as a child; but they have two more children, daughter Kelly (Olivia Friedman) and son Davis. Rene moved to Washington, D.C., where she was a successful attorney for many years; but, after the death of her father, Rene decides to move back to Birmingham and establish a law practice there. She reunites with M.E., and the two quickly resume their close friendship. In every episode, contemporary storylines are interwoven with a storyline from their shared past.

== Format ==
Each hour-long episode explores a theme contained alternating scenes from two different timelines. The 1960s timeline followed the young version of the girls, who were best friends in Birmingham in the 1960s. Their friendship provides an inside look at the civil rights movement as it affects the residents of Birmingham. Their friendship blossoms despite the discomfort of M.E.'s naively bigoted parents and her openly racist Uncle Jimmy, an avowed member of the Ku Klux Klan. M.E. and Rene's friendship was fostered by Renee's activists parents along with M.E.'s loving grandmother and her older brother, Johnny, who was sent to Vietnam, while M.E.'s older sister, Teresa, often threatened to tell their parents that M.E.'s "little colored friend" had been in their house. Colliar Sims (Chris Mulkey), M.E.'s childhood sweetheart and eventual husband, played a large role in this timeline as well. Rene's family included her father, James (John Lafayette), who was a lawyer and an active member of the Civil Rights Movement; her mother, Sarah, also active in the movement; and her older brother Elston, who was the same age as M.E.'s brother Johnny but dodged the draft by fleeing to Canada.

The contemporary timeline showed M.E. and Rene as adults. M.E. is a homemaker with aspirations of becoming a writer, and Rene starts her own law firm in Birmingham. Characters from the 1960s timeline appeared in the contemporary timeline as well, such as Rene's widowed mother, her brother Elston (openly gay, who has a son by a surrogate), who his partner adopts, M.E.'s oft-divorced sister Teresa (Delta Burke), and M.E.'s aging parents, whose views on race had mellowed somewhat over the years, quite in contrast to unrepentantly racist Uncle Jimmy, who still antagonized Rene if given the chance.

The show dealt with issues like modern-day racism, homosexuality, religion, women's rights, rape, natural disaster, alcohol, suicide, and death. During Season 3, M.E.'s daughter Kelly dated an African-American boy, Ajoni (Derrex Brady), and became pregnant by him at age 17, much to Colliar's dismay; Kelly and Ajoni chose to marry and keep the baby, whom they named Emmett. Eventually, M.E. published a book and was invited to teach at the local college. Rene's over-all story arc dealt mainly with her law practice; although she enjoyed great success as a lawyer, eventually focusing her practice on civil rights law, she sometimes regretted that she had never married nor had a family. In the final episode of the show, Rene married Judge Clyde "Turk" Terhune (William Allen Young).

In most episodes there was either a common theme between the scenes presented from each timeline, or a direct connection between the events depicted in the past and how it affected those in the present. This relationship between past and present often explores the effect of past damage on the present day.

The show included real-life topics such as police traffic stops that are unusually fatal for Black people, in the episode "It's a Good Thing I'm Not Black" in which Rene is forced to lie down on the sidewalk after being pulled over.

In the fourth season, the actresses Mae Middleton (M.E.) and Shari Dyon Perry (Rene) were replaced by Olivia Hack and Maya Goodwin, respectively, as the producers wanted the girls to encounter more mature storylines. However, Dan Byrd kept the role of Colliar Sims.

Any Day Now ended after 88 episodes, with Rene's marriage, as well as M.E. and Rene's mothers finally putting an end to their decades-long animosity.

Any Day Now is currently being aired on Start TV daily at 7 AM Eastern/6 AM Central.

== Cast ==
=== Main ===
- Annie Potts as Mary Elizabeth "M.E." Sims
- Lorraine Toussaint as Rene Jackson
- Shari Dyon Perry as Young Rene Jackson (seasons 1–3)
- Mae Middleton as Young M.E. O'Brien (seasons 1–3)
- Chris Mulkey as Colliar Sims
- Derrex Brady as Ajoni Williams
- Olivia Friedman as Kelly (Sims) Williams
- John Lafayette as James Jackson/Uncle Jimmy
- Donzaleigh Abernathy as Sara Jackson
- Maya Goodwin as Young Rene Jackson (season 4)
- Olivia Hack as Young M.E. O'Brien (season 4)

=== Supporting ===
- Julie St. Claire as Joy (season 1)
- Richard Biggs as Detective Bill Moody
- Christopher Winsor as Davis Sims (season 1)
- Christopher Babers as Young Elston Jackson
- William Converse-Roberts as Matthew O'Brien
- Nancy Mcloughlin as Catherine O'Brien
- Ian Bohen as Johnny O'Brien
- Elise Shirley as Young Theresa O'Brien
- Delta Burke as Theresa O'Brien
- Michael Pavone as Jimmy O'Brien
- Dan Byrd as Young Colliar Sims
- Millie Perkins as Grandma Irene Otis
- Bronson Picket as Joe Lozano
- Tony Barriere as Young Tully
- Mary-Pat Green as Odessa
- Taneka Johnson as Lakeisha Reynolds
- Don McManus as Graham Pearce
- Alyssa Nichols as April
- Alexandra Hedison as Rhonda
- Monique Edwards as Cynthia
- Calvin Devault as Davis Sims (seasons 2–4)

== Production ==
Nancy Miller, co-creator, executive producer and showrunner had spent summers during her childhood in Birmingham at a time when there were still segregated fountains. Miller used those past histories in creating the show. Valerie Woods, who started as first executive story editor and later became co-executive producer, was equally committed to creating a show that would examine difficult topics in a useful way.

Miller started trying to get Any Day Now in to production starting in 1990, envisioning it as a combination of Wonder Years and Mississippi Burning. CBS agreed at one point, but then cancelled before production began.

The writers' room of Any Day Now was diverse - at least 50 percent of the writers were people of color, almost all of whom were black. The diverse cast members themselves also participate in the creative process. Donzaleigh Abernathy, who plays Rene's mother, is the daughter of Rev. Ralph Abernathy, who was a civil rights leader himself. Lifetime was receptive to the show taking on difficult subject.

== Episodes ==
=== Series overview ===
| Season | Episodes | Originally released | |
| Season | Episodes | First released | Last released |
|---|---|---|---|
| 1 | 22 | August 18, 1998 | March 9, 1999 |
| 2 | 22 | August 15, 1999 | March 12, 2000 |
| 3 | 22 | July 23, 2000 | March 18, 2001 |
| 4 | 22 | July 15, 2001 | March 10, 2002 |

=== Season 1 (1998–1999) ===
| No. overall | No. in season | Title | Directed by | Written by | Original release date |
|---|---|---|---|---|---|
| 1 | 1 | "Unfinished Symphony" | Jeff Bleckner | Deborah Joy LeVine & Nancy Miller | August 18, 1998 |
Present: Rene Jackson returns to Birmingham for her father's funeral and gets reacquainted with her childhood friend, Mary Elizabeth Sims, who is married with two kids. Past: Rene and M.E. meet for the first time.
| 2 | 2 | "Huh?" | Oz Scott | Nancy Miller | August 25, 1998 |
Present: Rene defends a past rape victim whose rapist wants custody of "their" son. M.E. is dealing with Kelly and school. Past: M.E. introduces Rene to her mother.
| 3 | 3 | "Eve of Destruction" | Joe Ann Fogle | Dee Johnson | September 1, 1998 |
Present: Birmingham Daily writes an article about Rene. M.E. and Colliar's neighbor sues them. They counter sue for chasing Kelly and Davis with a rake. Past: M.E. is worried about the Cuban Missile Crisis and Rene question their friendship.
| 4 | 4 | "It's Called Depression" | Artie Mandelberg | Deborah Joy LeVine & Nancy Miller | September 8, 1998 |
Present: Approaching their 26th wedding anniversary, M.E. and Colliar are at odds; Rene tries to build on a relationship with a man who only wants sex. Past: M.E. forced to attend charm school; Colliar and M.E. share their first kiss.
| 5 | 5 | "Making Music with the Wrong Man" | James Hayman | Kathleen McGhee-Anderson | September 15, 1998 |
Present: Rene helps plan a ceremony honoring her father. She asks M.E. to write his biography. M.E. discovers he had an affair. Rene almost doesn’t go ahead with the ceremony but changes her mind after talking with her mother. Past: "Project C" is going on in Birmingham. Rene’s father is arrested and Rene develops her first crush.
| 6 | 6 | "No Comment" | Joeann Fogle | Sibyl Gardner | September 29, 1998 |
Present: Rene defends an old family friend, then realizes he lied and is guilty. M.E. and Rene decide that they won't discuss politics. Past: March on Birmingham coming, M.E. gives Rene her St. Christopher medal for protection.
| 7 | 7 | "Please Don't Tell My Mother" | Sharron Miller | Bob Lowry | October 6, 1998 |
Present: M.E. and Colliar catch Kelly with a boy during a party in their home and find a beer bottle afterward. Rene helps a boy who sees a gun in a fellow student’s locker and Kelly when she’s arrested for drunk driving. Past: Rene gets her period for the first time.
| 8 | 8 | "Courage...It Means Heart" | Oz Scott | Valerie Woods | October 13, 1998 |
Present: M.E. takes in her grandmother who has dementia. Her grandmother then commits suicide. Past: Rene, M.E. and Colliar spend time with M.E.’s grandmother.
| 9 | 9 | "You Shoulda Seen My Daddy" | Mel Damski | Mark Israel | October 20, 1998 |
Present: M.E. plans to meet Rene’s friends. Rene takes on a case involving AIDS. Past: Rene spends time with a girl who is visiting and sees her father in a courtroom.
| 10 | 10 | "Call Him Johnny" | Artie Mandelberg | Annie Brunner | October 27, 1998 |
Present: Rene represents a white couple trying to adopt a black girl they were fostering. M.E. is pregnant. Past: Johnny tries to take M.E. and Rene to a soda shop.
| 11 | 11 | "It's Who You Sleep With" | Jan Eliasberg | Dee Johnson & Valerie Woods | November 3, 1998 |
Present: Rene represents two women who want to be married. M.E. finds out that Colliar is talking to another woman online. Past: the girls learn about sex and try to catch Johnny with his girlfriend.
| 12 | 12 | "Salamanders" | Michael Pavone | Sibyl Gardner | December 1, 1998 |
Present: Renee represents a client who is suing for land that was taken from her grandmother. M.E. has her first story published and learns Colliar lost his job. Past: M.E. wins a talent contest at school.
| 13 | 13 | "I Feel Awful" | Artie Mandelberg | Bob Lowry & Nancy Miller | December 8, 1998 |
Present: Rene is stalked by a blind date. M.E. and Colliar are struggling with their relationship while Theresa comes to visit. Past: M.E.’s mother has to take Rene to a white hospital when she’s injured in their home.
| 14 | 14 | "Quit Bein' Such a Scaredy Cat" | James Hayman | Dee Johnson | December 15, 1998 |
Present: Rene is still being stalked by Michael and takes him to court for being in her home. M.E. and Colliar start their own business. Past: Rene and M.E. sneak out to go to the carnival but stumble upon a Klan meeting and find out M.E.'s uncle Jimmy is in the Klan.
| 15 | 15 | "Blue" | Artie Mandelberg | Kathleen McGhee-Anderson | January 5, 1999 |
Present: Rene reunites with her cousin who spent 20 years passing as a white man and has leukemia. Past: Rene's aunt encourages her to sing in the church choir while M.E. gets pushed to the side.
| 16 | 16 | "It's Your Problem, Not Mine" | Bob McCracken | Mark Israel | January 12, 1999 |
Present: Mary Elizabeth and Collier meet Kelly's boyfriend. Renee defends a junkie who was beaten by a policeman and goes out with Detective Moody. Past: Renee goes to a Jack and Jill dance and gets in trouble for sneaking out of the house.
| 17 | 17 | "Trust Me" | Michael Zinberg | Valerie Woods | January 19, 1999 |
Present: Renee mentors a high school student. Her mother, Sarah, starts dating. Mary Elizabeth flirts with an employee. Past: Renee's crush goes on a bus trip. M.E. develops interest in the civil rights movement.
| 18 | 18 | "I Wish You Could Understand" | Michael Pavone | Star Frohman & Bob Lowry | January 26, 1999 |
| 19 | 19 | "Chapter One" | Jan Eliasberg | Annie Brunner | February 9, 1999 |
| 20 | 20 | "I'm Not Emotional" | Artie Mandelberg | Sibyl Gardner | February 16, 1999 |
| 21 | 21 | "Music from My Life" | Arvin Brown | Bob Lowry | March 2, 1999 |
| 22 | 22 | "It's About the Heart" | Artie Mandelberg | Nancy Miller | March 9, 1999 |

=== Season 2 (1999–2000) ===
| No. overall | No. in season | Title | Directed by | Written by | Original release date |
|---|---|---|---|---|---|
| 23 | 1 | "You Promise? I Promise" | Jan Eliasberg | Mark Israel | August 15, 1999 |
Present: Rene represents a man who doesn't want a vasectomy; Past: M.E. and Rene sneak off to a rock concert.
| 24 | 2 | "You Really Believe in That Stuff?" | Artie Mandelberg | Dee Johnson & Valerie Woods | August 22, 1999 |
Present: Rene is sued by a former client for malpractice; Past: M.E. makes a decision to become a Baptist.
| 25 | 3 | "It's a Man's World" | Michael Zinberg | Star Frohman | September 5, 1999 |
Present: Rene and Bill disagree on a house; M.E. gets the attention of her boss; Past: M.E. fights with a new girl who flirts with Colliar.
| 26 | 4 | "Don't Say Anything" | Michael Pavone | Kathleen McGhee-Anderson & Sibyl Gardner | September 12, 1999 |
Present: Rene and Bill discover that they have different styles of parenting; M.E. gets fired after lying for a colleague; Past: M.E. and Rene discover that Colliar is being abused by his alcoholic father.
| 27 | 5 | "Heads or Tails" | Bob McCracken | Dee Johnson & Bob Lowry | September 19, 1999 |
Present: Davis joins the football team; Rene represents a client who confesses to a 34-year-old murder; Past: Rene and M.E. learn that they share ownership of Port Dixie with a homeless woman claiming to be a Hungarian princess.
| 28 | 6 | "So This Is Intimacy?" | Artie Mandelberg | Nancy Miller | September 26, 1999 |
| 29 | 7 | "It's Not You, It's Me" | Bob McCracken | Dee Johnson | October 10, 1999 |
| 30 | 8 | "Family Is Family" | Jo Ann Fogle | Valerie Woods | October 17, 1999 |
| 31–32 | 9–10 | "It's Not About the Butter: Parts 1 & 2" | Artie Mandelberg | Nancy Miller & Bob Lowry | October 24, 1999 |
| 33 | 11 | "Elephants in the Room" | Michael Zinberg | Sibyl Gardner | October 31, 1999 |
| 34 | 12 | "That's Our Son, Bobby" | Artie Mandelberg | Mark Israel | November 28, 1999 |
| 35 | 13 | "Say Something" | Elodie Keene | Kathleen McGhee-Anderson | December 5, 1999 |
| 36 | 14 | "Eyes Wide Open" | Michael Zinberg | Mark Israel | December 12, 1999 |
| 37 | 15 | "A Parent's Job" | Valerie Norman | Dee Johnson & Valerie Woods | December 19, 1999 |
| 38 | 16 | "Homegirl" | Janet Davidson | Kathleen McGhee-Anderson | January 2, 2000 |
| 39 | 17 | "From This Day On" | Artie Mandelberg | Nancy Miller | January 9, 2000 |
| 40 | 18 | "Hey, Ugly!" | Bob McCracken | Sibyl Gardner | January 16, 2000 |
Present: Rene becomes a guardian ad litem for a teenager whose mother is being investigated for abuse after allowing her daughter to undergo various cosmetic procedures; M.E. and Colliar confront Kelly after discovering a condom in her boyfriend's pocket; Past: M.E. and Rene give Tully's cousin Agnes a makeover to help her fit in.
| 41 | 19 | "Pay Your Dues" | Artie Mandelberg | Dayna North | January 23, 2000 |
Present: Rene helps Lakeisha out after she is brought up before the Bar Association for misrepresenting herself as an attorney; Past: M.E. and Rene become lookouts for a poker game.
| 42 | 20 | "You Think I Am Lying to You?" | Joanna Kerns | Dee Johnson & Valerie Woods | January 30, 2000 |
Present: Rene represents Bill after he is involved in a controversial shooting; Past: M.E. suspects Colliar is cheating on her with Rene.
| 43 | 21 | "The Toolshed Behind the Church" | Jan Eliasberg | Bob Lowry | March 5, 2000 |
Present: M.E. and Colliar discover that their neighbor is a convicted pedophile; Rene considers renovating her father’s office; Past: Rene accidentally hits Johnny's baseball into the yard of a mysterious neighbor that M.E. is suspects of being a murderer.
| 44 | 22 | "Who Abandoned Who?" | Artie Mandelberg | Mark Israel | March 12, 2000 |
Present: M.E. convinces Rene to attend their high school reunion; Past: Rene is anxious about attending a predominately white high school while M.E. goes on a hunger strike in order to convince her father to allow her to attend South Birmingham High School.

=== Season 3 (2000–2001) ===
| No. overall | No. in season | Title | Directed by | Written by | Original release date |
|---|---|---|---|---|---|
| 45 | 1 | "Nope" | Kevin Hooks | Dee Johnson & Bob Lowry | July 23, 2000 |
Present: Rene represents a teenage boy charged with murder and the prosecutor wants to try him as an adult; Past: M.E. and Rene decide to experiment with alcohol.
| 46 | 2 | "It's a Good Thing I'm Not Black" | Artie Mandelberg | Valerie Woods | July 30, 2000 |
Present: When Rene is pulled over by the police and humiliated by them, she wants to put the incident behind her, but after witnessing a college student go through the same ordeal, she changes her mind; Past: M.E. supports the civil rights movement by forming a group of White Muslims consisting of Colliar, Bobby and Tully.
| 47 | 3 | "Three Hours a Week" | Janet Davidson | Sibyl Gardner | August 6, 2000 |
Present: M.E. is pleased when her book sells out at a local bookstore and is later asked to appear on a local TV show; Rene is assigned a 14 year old girl to mentor; Past: Teresa decides to become a nun after being denied as captain of the cheerleading squad.
| 48 | 4 | "The Dust of Life" | Artie Mandelberg | Mark Israel | August 13, 2000 |
Present: M.E. is shocked when a Vietnamese man claims to be Johnny's son; Rene represents a man who wants full custody of his children by enforcing a prenatal contract he made with his ex-wife; Past: Johnny returns on leave from boot camp.
| 49 | 5 | "Three Lucky Ladies on the Line" | Joanna Kerns | Bob Lowry & Dayna North | August 20, 2000 |
Present: M.E. gives Tillie an ultimatum after Tillie faces issues with a loan shark; Past: James is assaulted by the police during the march in Selma.
| 50 | 6 | "Nothing Personal" | Michael Zinberg | Sibyl Gardner | September 3, 2000 |
Present: M.E. is upset when Rene hires a black contractor instead of Colliar to do some renovations on her house; M.E. is put in the middle when Colliar sues one of Rene's clients for reverse discrimination when he loses out on a job to a black contractor who submitted a higher bid; April is diagnosed as bipolar, but resists taking her medicine; Kelly and Ajoni start dating again. Past: Inspired by their favorite mystery books, Rene and M.E. decide to play detective and follow James, and accidentally help him to discover that the F.B.I. is tapping his phones.
| 51 | 7 | "Life" | Elodie Keene | Kathleen McGhee-Anderson | September 10, 2000 |
Present: M.E. decides to write a book about the unsung heroes of the civil rights movement; Rene reunites with a friend from her past who is serving a life sentence in prison; Past: Sara fills in for James after he is arrested during a protest.
| 52 | 8 | "Love Is Love" | Janet Davidson | Mark Israel | October 8, 2000 |
Present: Racial tension arises between the Sims and Williams families after Ajoni is discovered by M.E. in Kelly's bedroom; Past: when M.E. reveals that Rene has a crush on a white boy, Rene's grandmother is not pleased.
| 53 | 9 | "There Are No Rules" | Elodie Keene | Valerie Woods | October 15, 2000 |
Present: During a road trip, Rene and M.E. end up carjacked and Rene is arrested for car theft; Past: M.E. and Rene explore the possible existence of aliens.
| 54 | 10 | "The Outsiders" | Michael Zinberg | Dayna Lynne North | October 29, 2000 |
Present: M.E. discovers something surprising while interviewing a Baptist minister for an article; Past: M.E. threatens to break up with Colliar if she's not allowed in his band and is surprised when Colliar breaks up with her instead.
| 55 | 11 | "It's a Mother-Daughter Thing" | Artie Mandelberg | Nancy Miller | November 5, 2000 |
Present: M.E. and Colliar are shocked when they learn that Kelly is pregnant; Past: Rene gets a new boyfriend while Colliar and M.E. go through a rough patch.
| 56 | 12 | "Lighten Up, Rene" | Janet Davidson | Lois Johnson | December 3, 2000 |
| 57 | 13 | "Where's the Justice in That?" | Joanna Kerns | Denitria Harris-Lawrence | December 10, 2000 |
| 58 | 14 | "Five Golden Rings" | Artie Mandelberg | Valerie Woods & Dayna Lynne North | December 17, 2000 |
Present: M.E.’s parents come for Christmas and find out about Kelly’s pregnancy. Kelly and Ajoni get engaged. Rene tries to host a holiday party for lawyers. April moves away with her grandmother. Past: M.E. and Rene learn valuable lessons about Christmas and giving.
| 59 | 15 | "Life Isn't Fair" | Briana London | Bob Lowry & Dayna North | January 14, 2001 |
Present: Kelly gets kicked out of high school and hires Rene to help her. Past: the girls learn about kissing and “the bases”.
| 60 | 16 | "Ten Days? Are You Crazy?" | Mark Taylor | Mark Israel & Dayna North | January 21, 2001 |
Present: Kelly and Ajoni decide to move up the wedding. Rene’s identity is stolen. Past: M.E. And Rene try to help Elston from being enlisted.
| 61 | 17 | "Tick, Tick, Tick" | Valerie Norman | Nicole Mirante & Nancy Miller | February 18, 2001 |
Present: Kelly and Ajoni get married. Past: M.E. smokes marijuana.
| 62 | 18 | "Don't Tell Me It's Not About Frankie" | Janet Davidson | Alexandra Bleckner & Nancy Miller | February 25, 2001 |
Present: Rene is hired by a woman who is raped and tries to get a longer sentence for the rapist. Colliar and M.E. argue about the living arrangements. Past: Colliar is jealous of Henry while at the fair with M.E. and Rene.
| 63 | 19 | "What If?" | Michael Zinberg | Mark Israel & Dayna North | March 4, 2001 |
Past: Colliar and his mom move away. Rene realizes that she doesn’t love Henry the way M.E. loves Colliar. Present: M.E. and Rene look at how different their lives would have been if their lives were reversed.
| 64 | 20 | "Children Are the Most Important Thing" | Gary A. Randall | Lois Johnson & Dayna North | March 11, 2001 |
Present: M.E. worries her marriage is ending, and Rene represents a woman who is fired after not covering for her co-workers who have children. Past: The O’Briens learn that Johnny has been killed in Vietnam.
| 65–66 | 21–22 | "It's Not Just a Word" | Artie Mandelberg | Nancy Miller, Denitra Harris-Lawrence & Dayna North | March 18, 2001 |
Present: Rene defends Ajoni’s classmate after he’s in a fight that leads to the death of another student. Kelly has high blood pressure and is sent to the hospital where she needs an emergency c-section. Uncle Jimmy passes away and stirs up memories of his involvement with the KKK. Past: The O’Brien’s plan to send M.E. to an all girl high school. Rene’s father fights for her right to be valedictorian.

=== Season 4 (2001–2002) ===
| No. overall | No. in season | Title | Directed by | Written by | Original release date |
|---|---|---|---|---|---|
| 67 | 1 | "Don't Forget to Take Out Your Teeth" | Michael Zinberg | Bob Lowry & Dayna North | July 15, 2001 |
Present: Kelly comes home from the hospital and relies heavily on M.E. and Colliar for help. M.E. and Colliar wonder if they have lost their spark. Rene opens her own practice. Past: Rene and M.E. start high school together.
| 68 | 2 | "No More Forever" | Briana London | Valerie Woods | July 22, 2001 |
| 69 | 3 | "Everyone Deserves to Be Loved" | Artie Mandelberg | Mark Israel & Dayna North | July 29, 2001 |
A disabled man seeks Rene's help when the state threatens to place him in an institution; and M.E. faces the severity of Alzheimer's disease with her father. In the past, Port Dixie is invaded by Rene and M.E.'s new high-school friends.
| 70 | 4 | "Don't Give Up" | Michael Zinberg | Dayana Lynne North | August 5, 2001 |
Present: Rene represents a group of families whose properties have lead poisoning in their soil from a local business.
| 71 | 5 | "One Hour of Drama" | Artie Mandelberg | Elle Johnson | August 12, 2001 |
Present: M.E. and Colliar lose their home from a tornado. Rene is trapped in her office with an ex-con. Past: M.E. gets the chicken pox. Rene is grounded by her mother.
| 72 | 6 | "No Place in This World" | Janet Davidson | Denitria Harris-Lawrence | August 19, 2001 |
Present: Rene fights for the rights of a homeless woman, while the newly homeless M.E. and Colliar search for shelter and comfort. Past: Unwelcome guests crash the girls' pajama party.
| 73 | 7 | "Peace of Mind" | Gary A. Randall | Nicole Mirante | August 26, 2001 |
Present: M.E. and Colliar get an insurance check. M.E. struggles with her emotions from the tornado. Rene defends Joe after he is sued by a guy he saved from an accident. Past: the girls take aptitude tests and are upset with the results.
| 74 | 8 | "The Contest" | Artie Mandelberg | Sibyl Gardner | September 9, 2001 |
| 75 | 9 | "This Is Not Foreplay, This Is War" | Michael Zinberg | Alexandra Bleckner & Nancy Miller | October 21, 2001 |
| 76 | 10 | "Blinded by the White" | Mark Taylor | Bob Lowry | October 28, 2001 |
Present: As M.E. visits Fillmore to speak with Davis's teachers, she is caught in the middle of a school shooting; shocked and devastated by having to watch a student die in the gunfire, M.E. turns to food for comfort; after Rene suffers an arrhythmia while they're on a date, Turk insists that she see a cardiologist; on the strength of the article M.E. writes about the shooting, Glenn offers her a weekly column; Rene inspires her neighbor. Past: Colliar is bullied and beaten when he supports Rene's running for Freshman Class Representative; M.E. is angry when he succumbs to pressure and votes against Rene.
| 77 | 11 | "Rebel with a Cause" | Gary A. Randall | Elizabeth Hatrick & Nancy Miller | November 11, 2001 |
| 78 | 12 | "Stay of Execution" | Jim Hayman | Denitria Harris-Lawrence | November 18, 2001 |
| 79 | 13 | "Still My Little Soldier" | Janice Cooke-Leonard | Valerie Woods | December 2, 2001 |
| 80 | 14 | "It's Not Karma, It's Life" | Artie Mandelberg | Dayna Lynne North | December 9, 2001 |
| 81 | 15 | "The Real Thing" | Tom McLoughlin | Lois Johnson | January 6, 2002 |
| 82 | 16 | "In Too Deep" | Michael Zinberg | Nicole Mirante | January 13, 2002 |
| 83 | 17 | "Call Him Macaroni" | Joanna Kerns | Beverly M. Sawyer | January 20, 2002 |
| 84 | 18 | "Truth Hurts" | Tom McLouglin | Mark Israel | January 27, 2002 |
Present: Rene defends a boy who wants to spend more time with his father. Past: Robert Kennedy is assassinated.
| 85 | 19 | "Boys Will Be Boys" | Janet Davidson | Bob Lowry & Louis Davidson | February 17, 2002 |
Present: Rene defends two women who are attacked during a reception. Kelly and Ajoni are fighting after he quits his job. Past: M.E. and Rene are attacked during a party in Rene’s basement and her parents blame them.
| 86 | 20 | "Let the Games Begin" | Roxann Dawson | Denitria Harris-Lawrence & Dayna Lynne North | March 3, 2002 |
| 87–88 | 21–22 | "Just the Beginning" | Artie Mandelberg | Valerie Woods, Mark Israel, Bob Lowry & Demitria Harris-Lawrence | March 10, 2002 |

== Reception ==
=== Critical reception ===
Anita Gates, writing for The New York Times at the onset of the series panned the initial episode, stating that it "strains credibility, embraces stereotype and generally falls short of expectations." Lynn Elber, writing for the Associated Press, noted at its premiere that it had taken eight years for Any Day Now to be produced, due to its ground-breaking format of being centered on race as well as the lives of women, and being set in the South.

Howard Rosenberg lauded Any Day Now on airing "It's Not Just a Word," which reflects on a certain racial slur and its ongoing effect on Black people, calling the episode "Thoughtful, volcanic, important". He praised the show overall for "raking over the still-raw sores of U.S. racism with candor, but also tenderness and humor. He ends his review by saying, "... if sages of the Academy of Television Arts and Sciences don't grant previously overlooked Any Day Now the Emmy attention it deserves this year, they'll have some explaining to do."

Anjali Enjeti praised Any Day Now for avoiding white savior plots and racial caricatures, while focusing on impacts of racism rather than white intent, and the commitment of the producers to delve honestly into difficult topics. Enjeti praised the themes of the show including the trauma caused by racism—both internal and systemic—and the privilege to remain silent in the face of oppression. Enjeti concludes, "If there was ever a time to watch a television series's forthright and intrepid depiction of prejudice, hatred, and the long, windy, and sometimes backward road to justice, it's now."

== Awards and nominations ==
=== Young Artist Awards ===
All performances were categorized into the "Best Performance in a TV Drama Series" category.

1998–1999 — All nominees won their own awards

- Dan Byrd — Supporting Young Actor
- Shari Dyon Perry — Supporting Young Actress
- Mae Middleton — Young Actress Age Ten and Under
- Tony C. Barriere — Guest Starring Young Actor

1999–2000 — Neither won an award

- Supporting Young Actor
  - Dan Byrd
  - Tony C. Barriere
- Supporting Young Actress
  - Shari Dyon Perry
  - Mae Middleton
  - Olivia Friedman

2000–2001 — (Nominated) Best Family TV Drama Series

=== Screen Actors Guild Awards ===
| Year | Association | Category | Work | Result |
|---|---|---|---|---|
| 1998/99 | Screen Actors Guild | Outstanding Performance by a Female Actor in a Drama Series | Any Day Now | Nominated |

=== NAACP Image Awards ===
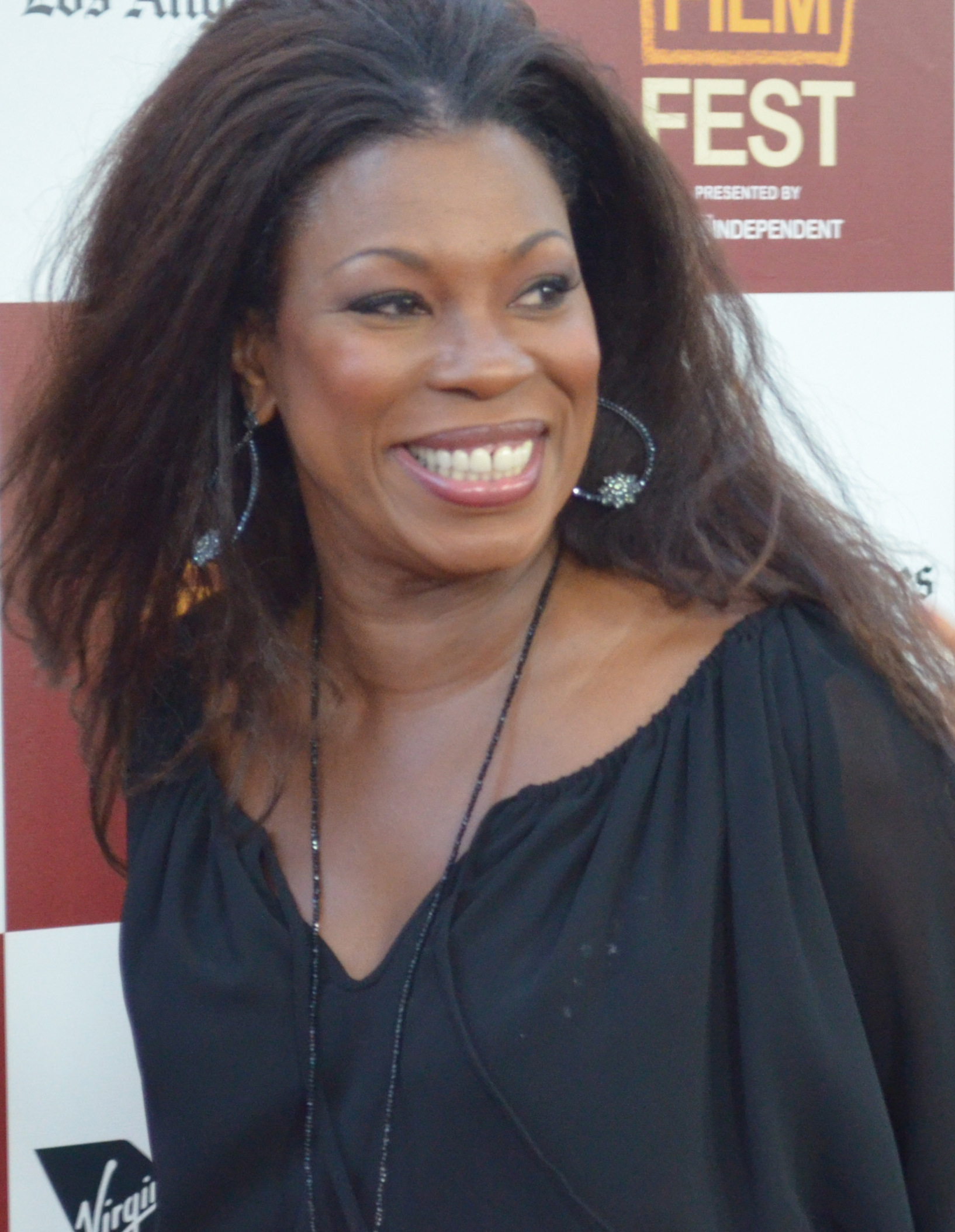
Toussaint in 2012

| Year | Association | Category | Work | Result |
|---|---|---|---|---|
| 1999 | NAACP Image Award | Outstanding Actress in a Drama Series | Any Day Now | Nominated |
| 2000 | NAACP Image Award | Outstanding Actress in a Drama Series | Any Day Now | Nominated |
| 2001 | NAACP Image Award | Outstanding Actress in a Drama Series | Any Day Now | Nominated |
| 2002 | NAACP Image Award | Outstanding Actress in a Drama Series | Any Day Now | Nominated |
| 2003 | NAACP Image Award | Outstanding Actress in a Drama Series | Any Day Now | Nominated |

=== Primetime Emmy Awards ===
2000 Primetime Emmy Awards — (Nominated) Outstanding Costumes for a Series: Mary Anne Aston (Costume Supervisor); Elizabeth P. Palmer (Costume Designer)

== See also ==
- Birmingham campaign
- Civil rights movement in popular culture
