= A Case of Deadly Force =

1986 television film

- Genre: Drama
- Based on: Deadly Force by Lawrence O'Donnell (as Lawrence O'Donnell Jr.)
- Directed by: Michael Miller
- Starring: Richard Crenna; John Shea; Lorraine Toussaint; Tate Donovan
- Theme music composer: Paul Chihara
- Country of origin: United States
- Original language: English

Production
- Executive producers: Kenneth Kaufman; Michael Lepiner
- Producers: Bruce S. Pustin; Dennis Nemec
- Production location: Boston
- Cinematography: Kees Van Oostrum
- Editor: Paul Fried
- Running time: 95 minutes
- Production company: Telecom Entertainment Inc.

Original release
- Network: CBS
- Release: April 9, 1986

A Case of Deadly Force is an American made-for-TV drama film that was released on April 9, 1986. The movie was shot in Boston, Massachusetts, United States, starring Richard Crenna, John Shea and Dylan Baker.

The film was adapted from the 1983 true crime book Deadly Force: The True Story of How a Badge Can Become a License to Kill (alternately subtitled A Police Shooting and My Family's Search for the Truth) by Lawrence O'Donnell. O'Donnell wrote the book after the 1975 unjustified shooting of 25-year-old James Bowden - an unarmed black man shot by white police officers, and its attendant cover-up by the Boston Police Department - when his own family became involved in the case. His father, Lawrence O'Donnell Sr., was the attorney for the plaintiff, Patricia Bowden.

== Plot ==
Undercover officers of the Boston Tactical Patrol Force (TPF) are instructed to watch for two tall black suspects in an earlier armed robbery. During their stakeout surveilling the presumed getaway car, officers Duggan (Michael O'Hare) and Mooney (Paul O'Brien) check their guns and joke about the upcoming violence. Reporter Dave O'Brian (Anthony Heald) and a photojournalist are in the back seat of the stakeout car to write an article about the TPF team, and they take detailed notes about what happens. When a black man gets into the watched car, the cops rush at and shoot him, then cheer about the murder. Later, in contradictory reports, they claim that Bowden struck Mooney with the car and that they shot in self-defense. When the police investigate the matter themselves, they decide their TPF officers acted correctly. But Bowden's widow, Patricia, knows her husband was no criminal.

Pat Bowden, now a single mother of two toddlers, hires attorney Lawrence O'Donnell Sr. (Richard Crenna), himself a former officer, to prove a wrongful-death case. The legal team, including his four sons (John Shea, Tate Donovan, Tom Isbell, and Dylan Baker), take on the police force.

O'Donnell's personal familiarity with the Police Department both helps and hinders his investigations. Like the accused officers, he is a proud Irish-American, and there is a sentiment of tribalism - both racially and occupationally - among the principals in the story. But O'Donnell also believes Pat when she urges that her husband was innocent. James had worked as a hospital janitor since he was 17. The robbery suspect being sought is 6 feet tall and thin; James was 5 feet 4 inches tall and weighed 180 pounds. O'Donnell knows which tactics to expect when bureaucrats stonewall and delay the case's progress. He is furious when two of the Force arrest his son Lawrence Jr. on a trumped-up charge and beat him up. But the cover-up has been bungled in many ways.

After shady "internal investigations" in which the Boston PD protects its Tactical Patrol Force shooters, at last the trial is held in 1980. The defense has strong problems with its case, beginning with the young and inexperienced defense attorney. Evidence has been planted or gone missing. Reporter Dave O'Brian recounts details from his ride-along which contradict the official version. James Bowden's car and license number are mistaken for those of the getaway car. The route that the said getaway car reportedly took was impossible as one of the streets in that route was at the time blocked with concrete bollards. The gun with which he allegedly shot at the cops was "found" a hundred feet away from Bowden's body. Though they claimed they shot in self-defense, they shot him in the back.

The jury finds for the Bowden family, and when the case is appealed, a second jury does too. The verdict became a landmark legal decision. For the first time in the United States, the city of Boston, after years of delays, awarded civil damages for a victim of a police killing. In March 1984, Pat Bowden won more than $840,000 and cleared her husband's name.

Towards the end of the film, a closing narrative stated that soon after the trial, the TPF was later disbanded.

== Cast ==
- Richard Crenna as Lawrence O'Donnell Sr.
- John Shea as Michael O'Donnell
- Lorraine Toussaint as Pat Bowden
- Francis X. McCarthy as Hanna (as Frank McCarthy)
- Tom Isbell as Billy O'Donnell
- Dylan Baker as Kevin O'Donnell
- Michael O'Hare as Joe Duggan
- Tate Donovan as Lawrence O'Donnell Jr.
- Paul O'Brien as Ken Mooney
- Anna Maria Horsford as Virginia Cates (as Anna Marie Horsford)
- Anthony Heald as Dave O'Brian
- Fred J. Scollay as Judge Walter Jay Skinner

== Reception ==
The New York Times writes, "The film carefully limits the blame to the Tactical Patrol Force, which, it is implied, became so cocky and independent that it was operating without controls." Likewise, A Case of Deadly Force "studiously avoids sensationalizing" and, while it contains "inevitable docudrama distortions," it handles a difficult story well.

The Chicago Tribune calls it "a crisp, well executed film" with a "lively script," adding that the "entire cast is excellent, down to Frank McCarthy in a small but impressive role as the stocky, tight-vested city attorney, while the always-reliable Crenna spins off a solid combination of craftiness and feistiness, particularly in his courtroom scenes as he nimbly handles the arrogant tactical patrol force defendants as well as the all-white jury."

Reviewer Tom Shales of The Washington Post calls it "a darn good movie": "A film about racism that largely avoids the subject of racism and a story of police brutality that tiptoes around the subject of police brutality, A Case of Deadly Force certainly promises more than it delivers. Even so, it delivers a lot."
