= Leaving L.A. =

American drama television series

- Genre: Drama; Black comedy
- Created by: Nancy Miller
- Starring: Christopher Meloni; Melina Kanakaredes; Billie Worley; Hilary Swank; Lorraine Toussaint
- Composer: Susan Marder
- Country of origin: United States
- Original language: English
- No. of seasons: 1
- No. of episodes: 6

Production
- Running time: 60 minutes
- Production companies: Paid My Dues Productions; Rebel Heart Productions; Warner Bros. Television

Original release
- Network: ABC
- Release: April 12 – June 14, 1997

Leaving L.A. is an American drama television series that aired on ABC from April 12 until June 14, 1997.

== Premise ==
Drama with black humor about the Los Angeles County Coroner's office, where the employees examine the recently deceased.

== Cast ==
- Christopher Meloni as Reed
- Melina Kanakaredes as Libby
- Hilary Swank as Tiffany
- Lorraine Toussaint as Dr. Chan
- Billie Worley as Dudley
- Anne Haney as Martha
- Ron Rifkin as Neil

== Episodes ==
No.	Title	Directed by	Written by	Original release date	Prod. code
1	"Intermission"	Tom McLoughlin	Nancy Ann Miller	April 12, 1997	466151
Reed and Libby investigates the death of a rollerskating instructor and the wife of a restaurant owner.
2	"Give Them Names"	Oz Scott	Nancy Ann Miller	April 19, 1997	466153
Unidentified bodies are found in the Hollywood Hills.
3	"The Eyes of the City"	Vern Gillum	Nancy Ann Miller	April 26, 1997	466152
A college football star dies in police custody.
4	"The Black Widower"	Sarah Pia Anderson	Rick Kellard	May 31, 1997	466154
A man is convinced that his mother was murdered by her husband.
5	"Now?"	Tom McLoughlin	Harris Goldberg	June 7, 1997	466155
The office is under quarantine after exposure to bubonic plague.
6	"Dead Elvis"	Martha Mitchell	Rick Kellard and Harris Goldberg	June 14, 1997	466156
Dudley's father is shot to death. A crushed minivan is full of Elvis impersonators. Reed and Libby go out on their first date.
