= Bob McCracken =

- Birth name: Robert Edward McCracken
- Born: November 23, 1904; Dallas, Texas, U.S.
- Died: July 4, 1972 (aged 67); North Hollywood, Los Angeles, California, U.S.
- Genres: Jazz, dixieland, swing, big band
- Occupation: Musician
- Instrument: Clarinet
- Years active: 1920–1972

Robert Edward McCracken (November 23, 1904 – July 4, 1972) was an American jazz clarinetist.

He was born in Dallas, Texas, United States. Early in his career, McCracken played with local Dallas musicians, including Jack Teagarden, Eddie Whitley, the Southern Trumpeters, and Doc Ross's Jazz Bandits.

He lived in New York City from 1926–28, where he worked with Johnnie Johnston and Willard Robison's Levee Loungers. After returning to Dallas, he worked with Ligon Smith, Joe Gill, and Ross again, then toured with Joe Venuti and Frankie Trumbauer, before moving to Chicago in 1939. There he played with Bud Freeman (1939–40), Jimmy McPartland, Wingy Manone, Benny Goodman (1941), Russ Morgan, and Wayne King. He substituted for Barney Bigard in the Louis Armstrong All-Stars international tour in 1952–53. He then toured internationally with Kid Ory and Red Allen throughout the 1950s.

During his later years in Los Angeles, McCracken played in several Dixieland revival groups, working with Ben Pollack, Pete Daily, Wild Bill Davison, and again with Teagarden, Ory, and Allen. McCracken is on many recordings including Kid Ory's album, This Kid's the Greatest.

Jeff McCracken is his grandchild.
