= Dianne Houston =

American screenwriter, director, and producer

- Born: July 22, 1954 (age 72); Washington, D.C., USA
- Education: Howard University
- Occupations: Film Director; Television Director; Film Producer; Screenwriter
- Children: 2
- Writing career
- Years active: 1977-present

Dianne Houston is an African-American film director, producer and screenwriter. She is the first, and thus far only, African-American woman to be nominated for an Academy Award for work she directed.

== Early life ==
Dianne Houston was born on July 22, 1954, to Jack, an Army psychologist, and Edith, a schoolteacher. She grew up in the Lamond Riggs neighborhood of Washington, D.C.

She attended Woodrow Wilson High School, and was also a student at the Workshops for Careers in the Arts on the campus of George Washington University.

When she was 16, she moved to New York City to become an actress. However, frustrated by the lack and caliber of roles for black women, she decided to write her own plays. She later returned to Washington, D.C., in order to earn a fine arts degree in theater direction from Howard University.

Houston then moved back to New York City, where she wrote and directed for the street performance troupe, CityKids Repertory Company.

== Early career ==
Houston's first play, The Fishermen, was produced in 1977. She directed it at the Back Alley Theater in Washington, D.C. The play went on to be performed at the East Bay Arts Center in Richmond, the Sojourner Truth Cultural Arts Center in Fort Worth, and the 14th Street Playhouse in Atlanta.

Houston's writing eventually caught the attention of Warner Bros. The company sought her out to provide "doctoring" on one of its screenplays.

In 1990, she became a writer and executive story editor for the Oprah Winfrey-produced series, Brewster Place, a continuation of the miniseries, The Women of Brewster Place, based on the Gloria Naylor novel of the same name.

In 1992, Houston was commissioned to write "The International Sweethearts of Rhythm,” a screenplay about an all-women’s 1940's jazz band, inspired by an article the producers read about Rosetta Reitz in The Wall Street Journal.

In 1994 Houston wrote the screenplay for "Override", a science fiction short film based on the short story, "Over the Long Haul," by Martha Soukup. The film, starring Emily Lloyd and Lou Diamond Phillips, was directed by Danny Glover.

== Academy Award nomination ==
In 1995, Danny Glover introduced Houston to the Chanticleer Films program, which gave industry professionals their first chance to direct. She was one of four people selected to participate from 1,000 applicants. Through the program, she directed the short film, Tuesday Morning Ride, starring Ruby Dee and Bill Cobbs.

The film, about an elderly couple questioning the current value of their lives, is based on the 1933 short story, "A Summer Tragedy", by Harlem Renaissance writer, Arna Bontemps. Houston said of the film, "I have two elderly people with everything to live for and no way to do it in this society".

In 1996, the film was nominated for an Academy Award for Best Live Action Short Film. Houston became the first African-American woman to be nominated for an Oscar for directing work, and was also the only African-American nominee out of nearly 170 total nominations.

Told by top publicists that "Black women are not a novelty," Houston was unable to obtain a publicist for the awards, and wound up doing her own publicity. At the Academy Awards luncheon, the valet also refused to let her park her car, telling her that the parking area was "for nominees only."

Jesse Jackson, pointing out Houston being the only nominee of color, called for a boycott of the Oscars and led a demonstration against Academy Award broadcaster, ABC, to protest the film industry's lack of racial inclusion in hiring and creative opportunities. At the time, blacks accounted for less than four percent of the Academy's 5,000 members, and only two percent of the Directors Guild, Writers Guild and Local 44 members, respectively.

As of 2020, Houston remains the only black woman to have ever been nominated for an Oscar for directing.

== Later career ==
Houston has since directed for a variety of TV series, including Empire, NYPD Blue and Crossing Jordan.

As a screenwriter, she has written for Touchstone Pictures, Stephen Herek, and actors Danny Glover, Dustin Hoffman, Charles S. Dutton, Eddie Murphy, Missy Elliott, and Viola Davis.

== Personal life ==
Houston moved to Los Angeles in 1993. In 2005, after being diagnosed with Stage 3 cancer, she took a seven-year work hiatus to focus on her health.

She is married with two children. She is a lesbian.

== Filmography ==
=== Films ===
Year	Title	Writer	Director	Producer	Notes
2021	The Melony Armstrong Story	Yes	Yes	Yes	(announced)
2021	Seacole	Yes	No	No	
2017	Michael Jackson: Searching for Neverland	No	Yes	No	TV movie
2016	Surviving Compton: Dre, Suge & Michel'le	Yes	No	No	TV movie
2015	Runaway Island	No	Yes	No	
2005	Knights of the South Bronx	Yes	No	No	TV movie, Co-Writer
1996	Run for the Dream: The Gail Devers Story	Yes	No	No	TV movie, Co-writer
1995	Tuesday Morning Ride	Yes	Yes	Yes	Short Film
1994	Override	Yes	No	No	TV Short Film

=== Television ===
Year(s)	Title	Writer	Executive Producer	Director	Notes
2017-2020	Empire	Yes	Yes	Yes	Directed 4 episodes
2017	When We Rise	Yes	No	No	Wrote 1 Episode
2012	Single Ladies	No	No	Yes	Directed 2 episodes
2004	Crossing Jordan	No	No	Yes	Directed 1 Episode
2003	Soul Food	No	No	Yes	Directed 1 Episode
2002	Strong Medicine	No	No	Yes	Directed 1 Episode
2002	Presidio Med	No	No	Yes	Directed 1 Episode
2002	The Education of Max Bickford	Yes	Yes	No	Producer, Wrote 1 Episode
2002	NYPD Blue	No	No	Yes	Directed 1 Episode
2000	City of Angels	Yes	No	Yes	Executive story editor, Directed 1 Episode
1990	Brewster Place	Yes	No	No	

== Sources ==
- Bona, Damien. Inside Oscar 2. 2nd ed. Random House Inc., 2002 . Rpt. in Performing Arts. 6 Feb. 2011.
