= The Women of Brewster Place =

The Women of Brewster Place may refer to:

- The Women of Brewster Place (novel), a 1982 novel by Gloria Naylor
- The Women of Brewster Place (TV miniseries), a 1989 television miniseries based upon the novel
- Brewster Place, a 1990 television series based upon the miniseries
