= Paula Kelly (actress) =

American actress and dancer (1942–2020)

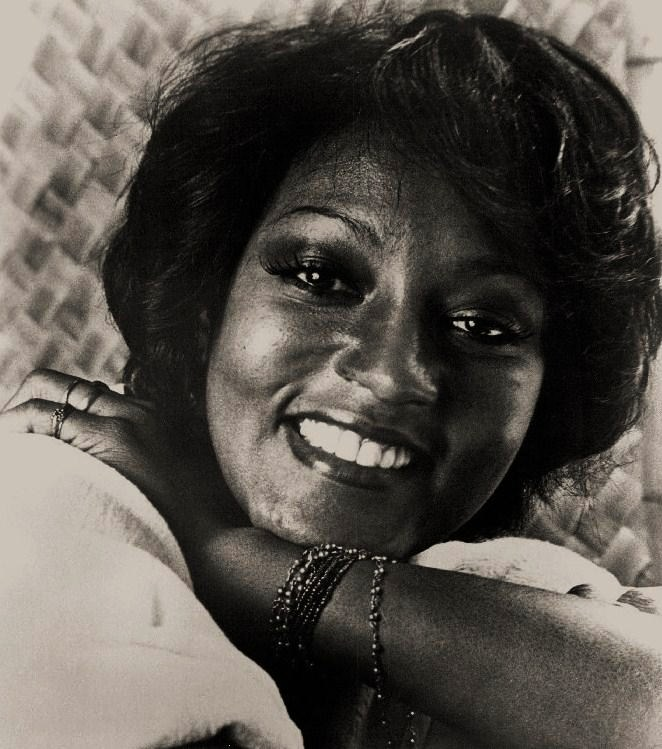
- Kelly in 1977
- Born: Paula Alma Kelly; October 21, 1942; Jacksonville, Florida, U.S.
- Died: February 8, 2020 (aged 77); Whittier, California, U.S.
- Education: Juilliard School of Music
- Occupations: Actress; dancer; singer; choreographer
- Years active: 1964–2000
- Spouse: Don Chaffey (m. 1985; died 1990)
- Children: 1

Paula Alma Kelly (October 21, 1942 – February 8, 2020) was an American actress, singer, dancer and choreographer in films, television and theatre. Kelly's career began during the mid–1960s in theatre, making her Broadway debut as Mrs. Veloz in the 1964 musical Something More!, alongside Barbara Cook. Kelly's other Broadway credits include The Dozens (1969), Paul Sills' Story Theatre (1971), Ovid's Metamorphoses (1971), and Sophisticated Ladies (1981), based on the music of Duke Ellington, appearing with Gregory Hines and Phyllis Hyman.

== Early life and education ==
Born in Jacksonville, Florida, Kelly was one of three daughters born to Ruth and Lehman Kelly, a jazz musician. By age six, Kelly's family had relocated to Harlem neighborhood of New York City. For high school, Kelly attended the High School of Music & Art, majoring in music. Kelly continued her studies at the Juilliard School of Music, where she majored in dance under Martha Hill. Graduating in 1964 with a M.S. degree, Kelly performed as a soloist with major modern dance companies such as Martha Graham, Donald McKayle, and Alvin Ailey.

== Career ==
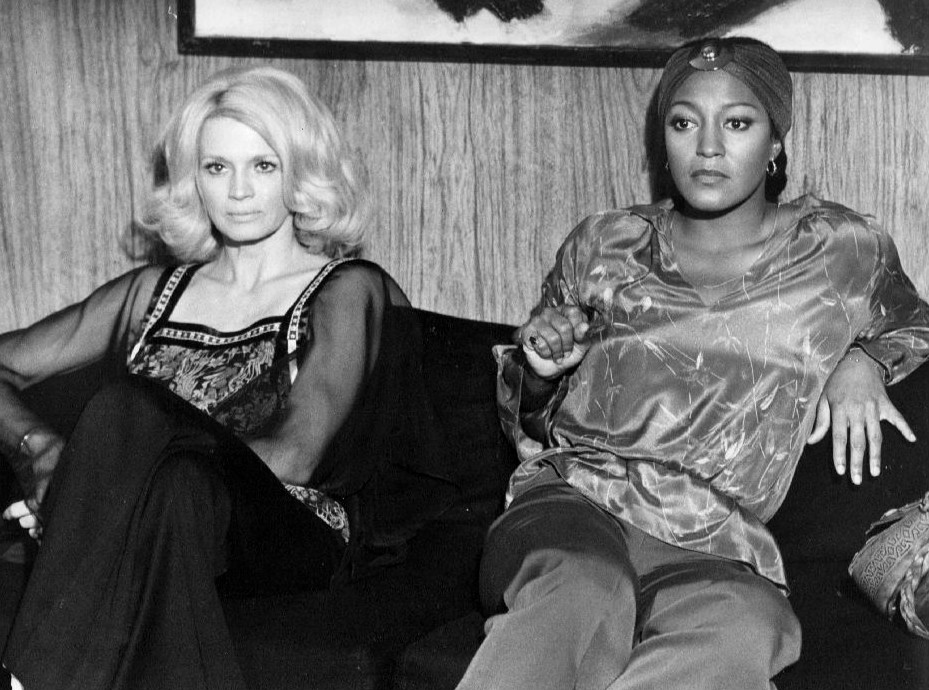
Angie Dickinson and Kelly in an episode of the NBC TV series Police Woman, 1976.

Kelly performed as guest artist and sometimes assistant choreographer for numerous television musical specials, including Sammy and Friends (starring Sammy Davis Jr.); co-choreographer of the BBC production of Peter Pan, in which she also performed the role of Tiger-Lily; Quincy Jones' TV tribute to Duke Ellington, We Love You Madly; The Richard Pryor Show; and Gene Kelly's New York, New York, in which the two Kellys performed a duet.

Kelly performed a dance solo at the 41st Academy Awards for the nominated title song from Chitty Chitty Bang Bang (1968). She appeared on the London stage in Sweet Charity with dancer and actress Juliet Prowse, for which Kelly won the London Variety Award for Best Supporting Actress. She starred in the record-breaking west coast premiere of Don't Bother Me, I Can't Cope at the Mark Taper Forum, for which she was awarded the Los Angeles Drama Critics Circle Award, Variety, and the first of three NAACP Image Awards. Kelly posed for a pictorial in the August 1969 issue of Playboy magazine, photographed by Lawrence Schiller.

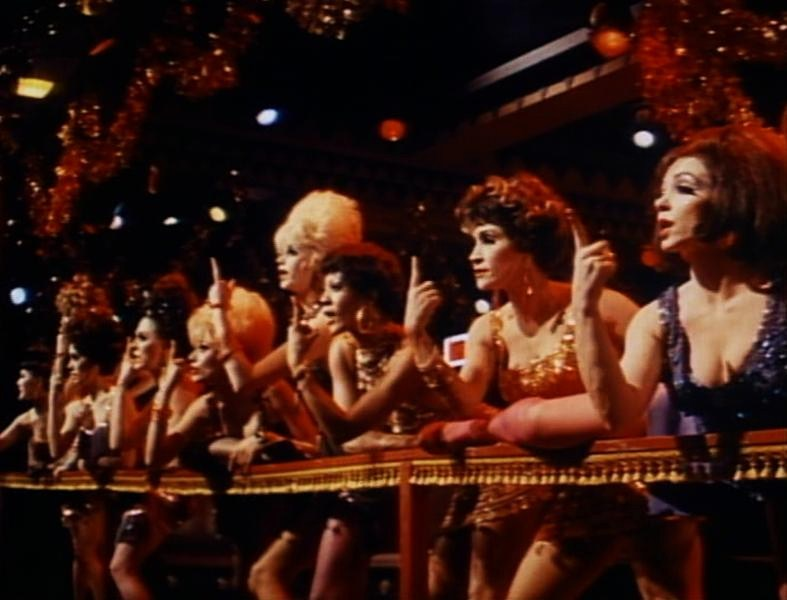
Paula Kelly (third from right) in Sweet Charity (1969). Chita Rivera is second from right.

Kelly's film credits include the Bob Fosse-directed film Sweet Charity; Soylent Green; The Spook Who Sat by the Door; The Andromeda Strain; Uptown Saturday Night; Lost in the Stars; Jo Jo Dancer, Your Life Is Calling; Drop Squad; and Once Upon a Time...When We Were Colored.

Kelly had a regular role as Liz Williams on the first season of the sitcom Night Court, for which she received an Emmy Award nomination. Kelly also guest-starred in a variety of television movies and sitcoms, including Sanford and Son, Kojak, Police Woman, The Golden Girls, Good Times, Any Day Now and in the Oprah Winfrey-produced TV mini-series The Women of Brewster Place (based on the 1982 novel of the same name by Gloria Naylor), in which she portrayed one half of a lesbian couple (with Lonette McKee) struggling against homophobia in an inner-city ghetto. Kelly was nominated for a second Emmy for her role in The Women of Brewster Place.

== Personal life and death ==
On September 15, 1985, Kelly married British film director Don Chaffey. Chaffey died in November 1990.

Her partner since 2003 was George Parkington.

Kelly died of heart failure on February 8, 2020, at the age of 77.

== Filmography ==
=== Film ===
Year	Title	Role
1969	Sweet Charity	Helene
1971	The Andromeda Strain	Karen Anson
1972	Cool Breeze	Martha Harris
1972	Top of the Heap	Black Chick
1972	Trouble Man	Cleo
1973	Soylent Green	Martha
1973	The Spook Who Sat by the Door	Dahomey Queen
1974	Three Tough Guys	Fay
1974	Lost in the Stars	Rose
1974	Uptown Saturday Night	Leggy Peggy/Mrs. Lincoln
1976	Drum	Rachel
1986	Jo Jo Dancer, Your Life Is Calling	Satin Doll
1993	Bank Robber	Mother
1994	Drop Squad	Aunt Tilly
1995	Once Upon a Time... When We Were Colored	Ma Pearl

=== Television ===
Year	Title	Role	Notes
1973	The Carol Burnett Show	Dance Instructor	Episode: "6.22”
1970	The Young Lawyers	Wilma	Episode: "A Busload of Bishops"
1970	Medical Center	Ellie James	Episode: "The Rebel in White"
1973	Sanford and Son	Olayia	Episode: "Lamont Goes African"
1974	Medical Center	Ames	Episode: "Saturday's Child"
1975	Cannon	Cora Bloom	Episode: "The Wedding March"
1975	The Streets of San Francisco	Carol	Episode: "Men Will Die"
1975–77	Police Woman	Linda Sommers	3 episodes
1976	The Streets of San Francisco	A. Chamberlain	Episode: "The Thrill Killers: Parts 1 & 2"
1976	Peter Pan	Tiger Lily	TV movie
1976, 1981	Insight	Grace (Holy Ghost), Vilma Johnson	2 episodes
1977	The Richard Pryor Show	Betty 'Satin Doll'	Episode: "1.1"
1977	Kojak	Janet Carlisle	Episode: "The Queen of Hearts Is Wild"
1979	Good Times	Dr. Kelly	Episode: "Where Have All the Doctors Gone?"
1980	The Cheap Detective	Inez Krowder	TV short
1981	Trapper John, M.D.	Betty Simons	Episode: "Straight and Narrow"
1983	Chiefs	Liz Watts	Miniseries, episode: "Part 3"
1983	Feel the Heat	Sally Long	unsuccessful television pilot
1984	Night Court	Liz Williams	Main cast (season 1)
1984	Hot Pursuit	Connie	Episode: "Portrait of a Lady Killer"
1984–85	Santa Barbara	Ginger Jones	Recurring role
1985	Hill Street Blues	Mrs. Eagleton	Episode: "Davenport in a Storm"
1985	Finder of Lost Loves	Alice Taylor-Hancock	Episode: "Aftershocks"
1986	St. Elsewhere	Sylvia	Episode: "Cheek to Cheek"
1986	Amen	Leona	Episode: "Rolly Falls in Love"
1987	Uncle Tom's Cabin	Cassy	TV movie
1987	CBS Summer Playhouse	Lt. Lois Poole	Episode: "Kung Fu: The Next Generation"
1987	The Golden Girls	Marguerite Brown	Episode: "The Housekeeper"
1989	The Women of Brewster Place	Theresa	Miniseries
1989	Mission: Impossible	Pepper Leveau	Episode: "Bayou"
1990	American Playhouse	unknown	Episode: "Zora Is My Name!"
1991	Baby Talk	Claire	3 episodes
1992	Room for Two	Diahnn Boudreau	2 episodes
1994	South Central	Sweets	4 episodes
1995	University Hospital	Dr. Leslie Bauer	Episode: "Shadow of a Doubt"
1996	Run for the Dream: The Gail Devers Story	Mrs. Devers	TV movie
1999	Any Day Now	unknown	Episode: "Family Is Family"
