= Singulart =

Art gallery in Paris

- Industry: Art Industry
- Founded: Paris (2017)
- Headquarters: Paris, France
- Website: www.singulart.com

Singulart is an online art gallery based in Paris, France. Founded in 2017, the platform connects contemporary artists with collectors worldwide, offering original works across painting, sculpture, photography, printmaking, and other mediums. As of 2025, Singulart represents over 12,000 artists from more than 165 countries.

== History ==
Singulart was founded in 2017 in Paris, France, by Denis Fayolle, Brice Lecompte, and Vera Kempf with the mission to connect artists with art collectors all over the globe. The company was founded to open up the international art market to artists and collectors, at a time when it was still fragmented across countries and many artists had yet to develop a digital presence.

This journey started with the first interaction of Vera Kempf and Denis Fayolle at a Startup Weekend event organized by Kempf. Denis, in that moment was the juror in the event and hesitated to invest in Kempf's then ongoing project. However, Fayolle asked her to connect once she wants to start a venture. In the next eight months, Vera reached out to Denis. They decided to start a venture in the art industry and came across Brice Lecompte during their hunt for a third partner with marketing expertise.

Kempf identified this opportunity after observing that the art market was still organised primarily around regional and national spheres, despite the growing internet adoption.

Co-founders

Vera Kempf, listed on Forbes 30 under 30 in 2019 for Retail and E-Commerce in Europe, is originally from Southeast France and studied Politics at the University Sciences Po in Paris. Kempf's deep appreciation for Arts stems from the early days of her childhood, watching her dad purse Art and Photography growing up.

Brice Lecompte, trained as an engineer, has originally grown up in the region of Champagne. He has publicly spoken about his ambition to build a company centered on equality and equal opportunities for artists regardless of their backgrounds.

Timeline

- 2017: Singulart launched as an online art gallery to empower artists all around the world.
- 2019: Singulart became the first online art gallery to exhibit at a physical art fair, beating barriers in the art world, and presenting works at SCOPE Art Show New York, Aqua Art Miami, Affordable Art Fair and many more since.
- 2021: Singulart raised €60 million in a Series B funding round, enabling the company to further improve brand awareness, reach new collectors, and help transform the art market. A furniture section was also added to the platform.
- 2022: The company launched a new platform called Balthasart, entirely dedicated to emerging and young artists and first-time collectors. Singulart also inaugurated the Singulart Awards to help strengthen the careers of artists represented on their platform.
- 2023: Singulart opens physical gallery spaces in Stuttgart and Berlin, extending its presence beyond the digital marketplace.
- 2025: The annual Singulart Award is rebranded as the Singulart Prize, with a total prize fund of $10,000.

Scale

As of 2025, Singulart brings together about 12,000 artists from more than 165 countries, draws approximately 2.6 million monthly visitors, and conducts the sale of about 1,700 artworks on a monthly basis. The company comprises over 120 employees from more than 25 nationalities, primarily based in Paris.

== Business Model ==
Artist Side

Artists apply to join Singulart through an open application process and are assessed by an internal curatorial team. Selection of the artists is based on demonstrated recognition, such as exhibitions or gallery sales and auction sales, to maintain quality standards. Once accepted, each artist is assigned a dedicated agent who helps facilitate communication with buyers online and manages their relationship with the platform.

Artists gain international exposure through Singulart's newsletters, social media channels, editorial content, and digital marketing campaigns, which collectively reach an audience of millions of collectors worldwide.

Collector Side

Collectors browse and purchase original artworks directly through the platform. All works listed are original pieces; reproductions are not sold and further editions are not published by the platform. Prices for works sold through Singulart range from below $1,000 to above $10,000 depending on the artist and medium.

Singulart offers an art advisory service through which collectors can receive personalised curation, custom commissions, and guidance from dedicated advisors. The platform provides worldwide shipping with secure packaging and accepts free returns.

== Funding ==
In 2021 Singulart raised €60 million in a Series B fundraising round, enabling the company to further improve brand awareness, reach new collectors, and help transform the art market. This round was led by Vitruvian Partners and other investors such as Ventech, BPI France, and Turenne Group also participated.

Prior to this, Singulart also secured a €10 million in a Series A fundraising round for the global expansion of its digital art marketplace.

== Developments and Initiatives ==
The Singulart Prize

Launched in 2022, the Singulart Prize was originally known as the Singulart Awards. It aims to empower artists and celebrate creativity. It engages the community to vote for their for their favorite artist. The winning artists are rewarded with a prize pool and benefits from Singulart's partners. This offers exposure to Singulart's artists who entail vision to shape the art industry.

In 2025, the competition was rebranded as the Singulart Prize. The 2025 edition was themed "Deeply Human." Winners included Kha Bamba (Senegal) as Artist of the Year, Joshua Adarkwa (United Kingdom) as Best Artist Under 30, and Myriam de Lafforest (Spain) for Best Limited Edition Work.

The Singulart Magazine

Singulart operates an editorial platform, the Singulart Magazine, which publishes artist interviews, features on contemporary art movements, and curatorial content. The magazine functions as an extension of the platform's mission to increase the visibility of represented artists and to engage a broader audience with contemporary art.

== Featured Artists ==
By providing artists with a platform to express their creativity, Singulart is helping to democratize the community while reducing barriers to entry. Some of the well-known artists on Singulart include:

- Sergey Piskunov
- Synthia Saint James
- Laura Zuccheri
- María Fernanda Cuartas
- Nina Murashkina
