= Rachael Crawford =

Canadian actress (born 1969)

- Born: 1969 (age 56–57); Toronto, Ontario, Canada
- Occupation: Actress
- Years active: 1986–present

Rachael Crawford (born 1969) is an actress best known for her roles in Brewster Place, Here and Now, and Show Me Yours, as well as guest appearances on various television series such as Cold Squad, Crossing Jordan, and later The Firm and Suits. Throughout her career, Crawford has received three Canadian Screen Award nominations.

== Career ==
Crawford began her acting career in the mid-1980s. She portrayed Renee, a teenage cousin of Mr. T's character, in crime drama T. and T. Crawford won the role of Kiswana Browne in the Oprah Winfrey produced series Brewster Place (1990), replacing Robin Givens who portrayed the character in The Women of Brewster Place. Crawford appeared regularly as college student Danielle in the sitcom Here and Now.

She appeared in various television movies during the 1990s. Crawford played the lead role of Tai Babilonia in biopic On Thin Ice: The Tai Babilonia Story. In 1996's Captive Heart: The James Mink Story, Crawford appeared as Myra Mink, a young black woman in the 1850s who becomes enslaved by her husband, a white man. James Mink was played by Louis Gossett Jr. She worked with Gossett again the following year, with In His Father's Shoes.

Crawford made her feature film debut in 1995's Rude as Maxine, a woman who chooses to have an abortion after ending a relationship with her boyfriend. She received a Canadian Screen Award nomination for her performance in this film. Crawford portrayed Petra, a circus performer who dates the female protagonist, in the 1995 film When Night is Falling. Stephen Holden of The New York Times praised Crawford's performance, believing she and co-star Pascale Bussières were an "appealing" couple. Another reviewer found the movie too "lowkey," but felt Crawford's character added "fascination" to the film.

Her other film work includes Curtis's Charm (1996) and Pale Saints (1997), being nominated for her second Canadian Screen Award for the latter. She was a main cast member on drama Traders as Niko Bach from 1998 to 2000. Crawford earned her third Canadian Screen Award nomination in 2000 for her work on the series.

During the 2000s, Crawford guest starred on science fiction series Mutant X and appeared as Dara Vann in The Man (2005). She portrayed Diane Haughton, the mother of Aaliyah, in Aaliyah: The Princess of R&B (2014). She had a regular role on drama series This Life as Danielle, the lead character's best friend, from 2015 to 2016. Crawford then played Crack in Brown Girl Begins (2017), a role one film critic found "chilling."

== Filmography ==
=== Film ===
Year	Title	Role	Notes
1995	Rude	Maxine	
1995	When Night Is Falling	Petra Soft	
1995	Curtis's Charm	Cookie	
1997	Pale Saints	Valdine	
1998	Kai Rabe gegen die Vatikankiller	Maskenbildnerin	
2003	The Sacrifice	Fortuneteller	Short film
2005	The Man	Dara Vann	
2009	Chains	Chain	Short film
2017	Brown Girl Begins	Crack	
2020	Possessor	Dr. Melis	
2024	Time Cut	Kendra	

=== Television ===
Year	Title	Role	Notes
1986	9B	Jenny Wevers	TV film
1986-1987	Dear Aunt Agnes	Marsha	Recurring role
1987	Adderly	Lucinda	Episode: "Who Do, Voodoo"
1988	9B	Jenny Wevers	Recurring role (5 episodes)
1988	T. and T.	Renee	Regular role (24 episodes)
1988	Friday the 13th: The Series	Stacy	Episode: "The Voodoo Mambo"
1989	E.N.G.	Janice Roberts	Episode: "E.N.G. Pilot: Part 1"
1989	Inside Stories	Gracie	Episode: "Gracie"
1990	E.N.G.	Janice Roberts	Episode: "All Things Betray Thee"
1990	Brewster Place	Melanie "Kiswana" Browne	Main role (11 episodes)
1990	On Thin Ice: The Tai Babilonia Story	Tai Babilonia	TV film
1992-1993	Here and Now	Danielle	Main role (13 episodes)
1994	Treacherous Beauties	Lois Parsons	TV film
1994	Free Willy	Marlene (voice)	TV series
1996	Side Effects	Viki	Episode: "Easy Breathing"
1996	Captive Heart: The James Mink Story	Mary Mink	TV film
1996	We the Jury	Warnicke	TV film
1997	The Outer Limits	Sherry McAllister	Episode: "Dark Rain"
1997	In His Father's Shoes	Celeste	TV film
1997-1999	Between Brothers	Teri	Main role (17 episodes)
1998	Twitch City	Expert	Episode: "People Who Fight Too Much"
1998-2000	Traders	Niko Bach	Main role (35 episodes)
1999	Love Songs	Sheron	TV film
1999	Nightworld: Survivor	Kat Holden	TV film
1999	Hoop Life	Paula Lyons	Episodes: "Rookie", "Of Human Bondage", "The Trade-Off"
2000	Earth: Final Conflict	Samira Farid	Episode: "Scorched Earth"
2000	Falcone	Mrs. Patterson	Episodes: "Lealta", "That's Amore", "You Can't Always Get What You Want"
2000	Dirty Pictures	Ann Bosworth	TV film
2001	Soul Food	Rhonda	Episode: "This Crazy Life"
2001	Cold Squad	Dr. Barbara Whittaker	Episode: "Vancouver Confidential"
2002	The Associates	Suzanne Erikkson	Episode: "Take This Job..."
2002	Crossing Jordan	Samantha Reid	Episode: "With Honor"
2002	Red Skies	Nicole	TV film
2002	Hell on Heels: The Battle of Mary Kay	Annika Kern	TV film
2004	Mutant X	Samantha Bennett	Episode: "Possibilities"
2004-2005	Show Me Yours	Dr. Kate Langford	Main role (16 episodes)
2005	CSI: Miami	Beth Jacobson	Episode: "Three-Way"
2006	Last Exit	Catherine Vargas	TV film
2008	The Trojan Horse	Colleen Howell	TV miniseries
2008	The Summit	Robin Levy	TV miniseries
2008	Sophie	Kim	Episodes: "Who's Your Daddy?", "Bursting Balloons"
2009	Sophie	Kim	Episodes: "Trust or Bust", "Wedding Bell Blues"
2009	'Da Kink in My Hair	Cheryl	Episode: "Licks!"
2009	Guns	Eva Innis	TV miniseries
2009	Being Erica	Alexis	Episodes: "Under My Thumb", "A River Runs Through It... It Being Egypt"
2009	Cra$h & Burn	Catherine Hearn	Episodes: "Trust", "The Boss Is Coming"
2011	Republic of Doyle	Dr. Jennifer Sullivan	Episode: "Crashing on the Couch"
2011	The Listener	Emily Miller	Episode: "Inner Circle"
2011	Call Me Fitz	Laverne	Episodes: "A** Hickey", "Dysfunctional Family Circus", "How Do You Say 'Blow Job' in Pennsylvania Dutch?"
2011-2012	Alphas	Jeannie Harken	Recurring role (6 episodes)
2012	King	Dr. Rausch	Episode: "Freddy Boise"
2012	The Firm	Dianne Ruckeyser	Recurring role (6 episodes)
2012	Suits	Ella Follman	Episode: "All In"
2014	Ascension	Ophelia	TV miniseries (3 episodes)
2014	Continuum	Catherine	7 episodes
2014	Aaliyah: The Princess of R&B	Diane Haughton	TV film
2015	Hello, it's me	Ericka	TV movie
2015-2016	This Life	Danielle Berg	12 episodes
2016	Heartland	Natalie	2 episodes
2017	Incorporated	Mrs. Morse	2 episodes
2017	The Expanse	Admiral Pena	2 episodes
2017	Private Eyes	Emila Mantella	1 episode
2017	Tin Star	Dr. Susan Bouchard	1 episode
2022	Revenge of the Black Best Friend	Aibleen	
