= Magical feminism =

Magical feminism is a subgenre of the magical realism literary genre. The term was first used in 1987 by Patricia Hart to describe the works of Isabel Allende. More recent critical works on the subject feature such scholars as Ricci-James Adams or Kimberley Ann Wells. The term magical feminism refers to magical realism in a feminist discourse. Magical realism's basic assumption is the coexistence and effective merging of contradictory worldviews, the scientific and rational with the spiritual and magical. It grants equal ontological status to real figures and spirits, everyday occurrences and supernatural events. In its nature then is the subversion of monolithic cultural, social and political structures. It is a mode perfect for the writers who are in between, especially the postcolonial ones. The genre is magical realism within the context of feminist discourse.

Seen from the post-colonial perspective, the magic and supernatural elements serve to disrupt reality giving voice to the Other, the oppressed groups. In the case of magical feminism the role of The Other is assumed by the marginalized women. The strategies of defamiliarization, supernaturalization, grotesque, intertextuality, are used to undermine the fossilized schemata and oppressive mechanisms of patriarchal domination and to create a space in which an independent version of identity and history can be manifested.

Magical feminism is popular among representatives of ethnic literature of the United States who operate in a hybrid culture and a hybrid language. They are for example Ana Castillo, Maria Helena Viramontes, Kathleen Alcalá, but also female authors from other parts of the world such as British writer Jeanette Winterson or Polish author Olga Tokarczuk.

Kimberley Ann Wells claims that the most important feature of this genre is the presence of a female magic user, most commonly a witch or a shamaness, metaphorically representing the female protest against the male-dominated world order and an act of independence.

== Model texts ==
- The House of the Spirits by Isabel Allende
- Mr Vargas and the Dead Ventriloquist by Cathleen Alcala
- So Far from God by Ana Castillo
- Loverboys by Ana Castillo
- Her Body and Other Parties by Carmen Maria Machado
- Beloved by Toni Morrison
- Mama Day by Gloria Naylor
- Their Dogs Came with Them by Helena Maria Viramontes
- The Passion by Jeanette Winterson
- Prawiek i inne czasy by Olga Tokarczuk
- Bunny by Mona Awad

== Movies and TV series ==
- Buffy the Vampire Slayer Dir. Joss Whedon
- Bewitched Dir. Nora Ephron
- Charmed Dir. Janice Cooke-Leonard
- The Craft Dir. Andrew Fleming
