= Knights of the South Bronx =

- Genre: Drama
- Teleplay by: Jamal Joseph; Dianne Houston
- Story by: Jamal Joseph
- Directed by: Allen Hughes
- Starring: Ted Danson; Malcolm David Kelley; Brian Markinson; Kate Vernon; Yves Michel-Beneche; Yucini Diaz; Antonio Ortiz; Eugene Clark; Keke Palmer; Clifton Powell
- Music by: Stephen Endelman
- Country of origin: United States
- Original language: English

Production
- Executive producer: Dianne Nabatoff
- Producers: Allen Hughes; John M. Eckert
- Production location: Toronto
- Cinematography: Derick Underschultz
- Editor: Conrad Gonzalez
- Running time: 90 minutes
- Production companies: A&E Networks; Tiara Blu Films; Fox Television Studios

Original release
- Network: A&E
- Release: December 6, 2005

Knights of the South Bronx is a 2005 American drama television film directed by Allen Hughes and written by Jamal Joseph and Dianne Houston. Based on a true story, it stars Ted Danson as a teacher who helps students at a tough South Bronx elementary school to succeed by teaching them to play chess. It aired on A&E on December 6, 2005.

== Plot summary ==
The film is based on the true story of David MacEnulty, who taught schoolchildren of the Bronx Community Elementary School 70 to play chess at competition level, eventually winning New York City and the New York State Chess Championships. The screenplay portrays whistle-blowing and a mid-life crisis that combine to remove Richard Mason (played by Ted Danson) from his old life. He becomes a substitute teacher and is assigned to a fourth-grade class in a South Bronx school. In the class are students with parents who are drug addicts or in jail or just scrambling to pay the bills. Few of them see a purpose in school other than meeting society's requirements, and he struggles, mostly in vain, to reach them.

Then a student whose father is in jail sees Mason in the park playing chess in a simultaneous exhibition, and beating fourteen opponents at once. The student asks to learn the game of chess. One thing leads to another, and soon the entire class is interested in chess. Mason convinces them that on the chessboard it doesn't matter how much money you have or what clothes you're wearing or where you come from, and that it's only how you move the chess pieces, then and there. The class forms a chess team to compete in ever-larger chess tournaments.

== Cast ==
- Ted Danson - Mr. Richard Mason
- Malcolm David Kelley - Jimmy Washington
- Brian Markinson - Arnie
- Kate Vernon - Pat Mason
- Yves Michel-Beneche - MD Duprais
- Yucini Diaz - Renee
- Antonio Ortiz - Dawson
- Eugene Clark - Gene
- Keke Palmer - Kenya Russell
- Clifton Powell - Cokey
- Devon Bostick - Darren
- Sandi Ross - Principal Nettie Weston
- Karen LeBlanc - Dolly
- Philip Akin - Asst. Principal Allen Hill
- Alex Karzis - Kasparov
- Nicholas Carpenter - Dawson's Opponent

== Production ==
The film was announced in January 2004, under the working title Chessmates. Filming took place in Toronto. David MacEnulty, the inspiration for the film's main character, taught the basics of chess to the child actors.
