= Mama Day =

1988 novel by Gloria Naylor

- Paperback edition
- Author: Gloria Naylor
- Language: English
- Genre: Postmodern literature, African-American Literature
- Published: 1988
- Publication place: United States
- Media type: Print
- Pages: 312 pp.
- ISBN: 0-679-72181-9
- Preceded by: The Meanings of a Word
- Followed by: Bailey's Cafe

Mama Day is the third novel by Gloria Naylor. The story focuses upon the tragic love affair of "star-crossed" lovers Ophelia "Cocoa" Day and George Andrews. The setting of the novel is split between New York City, where George was born and raised and Ophelia has recently moved, and Willow Springs, a fictional community situated on a coastal island on the border of Georgia and South Carolina where Ophelia's family has lived for several generations. The novel takes place within the same fictional universe as some of Naylor's other novels, indicated through its passing references to events and characters from both Linden Hills and Bailey's Cafe.

== Plot ==
Mama Day centers around the characters George and Cocoa. Cocoa, whose real name is Ophelia, is a young southern woman living in New York who is still deeply connected to her family and ancestry, even though her family's history is fraught with pain and tragedy. George grew up an orphan, overcoming a multitude of challenges in order to finally graduate from Columbia engineering school and co-found his own engineering company. Cocoa and George meet when Cocoa interviews for a job at George's firm. George is unable to hire Cocoa because the job starts immediately and she is obligated to visit Willow Springs every August to spend time with Mama Day and her family. Prior to returning to New York from her trip to Willow Springs, Cocoa writes a letter to George saying that she still wants the job. Mama Day intervenes and puts a mysterious substance on the envelope, which causes George to remember Cocoa and soon later recommend her to someone for another job. George and Cocoa begin to date and marry suddenly, but George doesn't visit Willow Springs with Cocoa for four years, during which time Cocoa never shares with him the more unusual and even supernatural aspects of Willow Springs.

After several years they return to Willow Springs together. When George finally does accompany her, being a practical minded engineer with no family history or special convictions to help him relate to the people of Willow Springs, he has a hard time believing in or understanding some of the events that take place. When he discovers that Cocoa is dying because of a hex put on her by the deeply jealous and hateful Ruby, who is a conjure woman and Mama Day's wicked counterpart, George wants to use practical means to save her life. Just as Cocoa begins to fall ill, a hurricane knocks out the bridge that is connected to the "outside" world, making entering or leaving the island impossible. George and Cocoa are now stuck in Willow Springs, and forced to use the remedies available through Mama Day and the mysticism of the island rather than modern treatment. The only person that can save Cocoa is George, by following the instructions of Mama Day. However, he is unable to surrender to and believe in the mystical forces that Mama Day has described to him. In desperation, he submits to Mama Day's directions because Cocoa is near death, and he is desperate for something to help her. In performing the ritual needed, he dies and ultimately saves Cocoa's life.

== Characters ==
Sapphira Wade – Mama Day's great-grandmother, who is known on the Island as the mystical "great, great, grand mother." The legend of her life is murky, but she is known to have been a slave woman who married Bascombe Wade, bore seven sons, and by some mysterious means gained the deed to the island of Willow Springs from her husband before he died in 1823, from which point the island became a community of free African Americans during the pre-Civil War era.

Miranda (Mama) Day – Mama Day is a witty old lady and the matriarch of Willow Springs. Mama Day is Cocoa's great-aunt and the sister of Abigail. She is a woman who believes in heritage, family, and a deep understanding of the power of nature. Mama Day is often meddling in Cocoa's life and truly wants to see her happy. Mama Day uses magic, nature, wit, and wisdom to help the people of Willow Springs.

Abigail Day – Cocoa's grandmother and Mama Day's sister. She is respectful, even-tempered and the peace maker of the family. Abigail Day is a doting grandmother who spoils Cocoa.

Ophelia (Cocoa) Day – The last living Day of her generation. She is headstrong and stubborn. When the novel opens she has been living in New York City since leaving Willow Springs to go to school seven years earlier, but she goes back to visit for two weeks every August. It is in New York that she meets George Andrews.

George Andrews – Cocoa's husband. George is an orphan who grew up in a shelter and knows nothing about his family or ancestry. Hardened by life he takes everything one day at a time, and carefully calculates all of his decisions and actions. He doesn't rely on anyone but himself to do things for him. He works at an engineering firm, and is fanatical about football because he's drawn to its detailed strategies. He also has a heart condition that he must monitor closely, which contributes to his need to regulate every aspect of his life.

Dr. Buzzard – The charlatan of Willow Springs. He brews moonshine and creates other "remedies" for various problems and ailments which he sells to the people of Willow Springs. Dr. Buzzard thinks that he and Mama Day are rivals, but Mama Day does not believe that they hold similar powers, or even that his powers are real.

Ruby – Ruby is a family friend who is overweight, insecure, jealous and practices voodoo. She uses her powers to manipulate Junior Lee into marrying her.

Junior Lee – Married to Ruby. Likes to drink and party, a shiftless individual.

== Style and structure ==
Mama Day is a novel whose subgenres include legend, folklore, mystery, and fantasy. It contains a multitude of narrative voices that include the following:

1st person plural narration – The communal voice of the people from Willow Springs is an example of this style. It is also the first one introduced to readers. This voice is best described as an omniscient voice that has been around to see everything. The introduction and sections throughout the book are written in this voice as the different stories of Bascombe Wade, Sapphira Wade, and what exactly "18 and 23" is. An example of this communal voice is in this sentence from the introduction that states, "And he coulda listened to them the way you been listening to us right now." Rita Mae Brown states that "The different voices are beautifully realized but confusing to read." As well as the communal voice, Mama Day offers both a first-person narration and occasionally a free indirect discourse that gives readers direct access to Mama Day's thoughts. Mama Day's section is preceded by three diamonds. In her narration she often speaks about what is taking place at present or events from her past.

1st person narration – Cocoa's and George's first person narration, which is displayed as a conversation to one another about events that have occurred, is the other narrative voice. It switches between the two characters without any evidence other than a brief space between the two sections. It is read as if the readers are overhearing the conversation. Because of these different narrative viewpoints the novel is filled with dramatic irony. Readers see this with the reoccurring imagery and symbolism of the "chicken", and "chicken coup".

Because of what Rita Mae Brown feels is a lack of "self-restraint" in Mama Day, keeping up with the plot of the novel and who is speaking, the reader is suggested to "press on doggedly….[So they can realize] that a plot is developing through these fragmented viewpoints."

Mama Day includes allusions to classical Shakespeare plays such as King Lear which is referred to many times by both Cocoa and George; Hamlet, which houses a female character by the name of Ophelia; and The Tempest, which includes a female character with the same name as Mama Day – Miranda. Like Miranda from the Shakespeare play, Mama Day also deals with magic or supernatural powers and is set on a secluded island. Bharati Mukherjee states that the storyline in Mama Day, like Shakespeare's play Romeo and Juliet, "concerns star-crossed lovers."

== Reception ==
Upon its publication, the novel received generally favorable reviews from a number of writers and critics. Rita Mae Brown's review for the Los Angeles Times found the multiple voices in the novel to be "beautifully realized" and suggested that readers willing to work through the confusions brought about by its fragmented narrative style would ultimately be rewarded by the book's "dazzling sense of humor, rich comic observation and that indefinable quality we call 'heart.'" Bharati Mukherjee, writing for The New York Times, registered disappointment with the love story between George and Cocoa, which she suggested fell short of Naylor's grand Shakespearean ambitions, but nevertheless commended the work as "a big, strong, dense, admirable novel." Rosellen Brown's review for Ms. was lukewarm, describing the plot as "alternately affecting and silly, though never less than interesting" and taking issue with Naylor's "need to elevate by making symbolic, or by fitting everything into a larger scheme" as well as the author's attempts at "didactically fostering our spiritual instruction." Linda Simon of Women's Review of Books commended the originality of Naylor's characters and the book's "amplitude and wit", but her review mainly focused on chiding Naylor for evading important questions about race and gender the novel implicitly raises.
