= Nina Murashkina =

Ukrainian contemporary artist

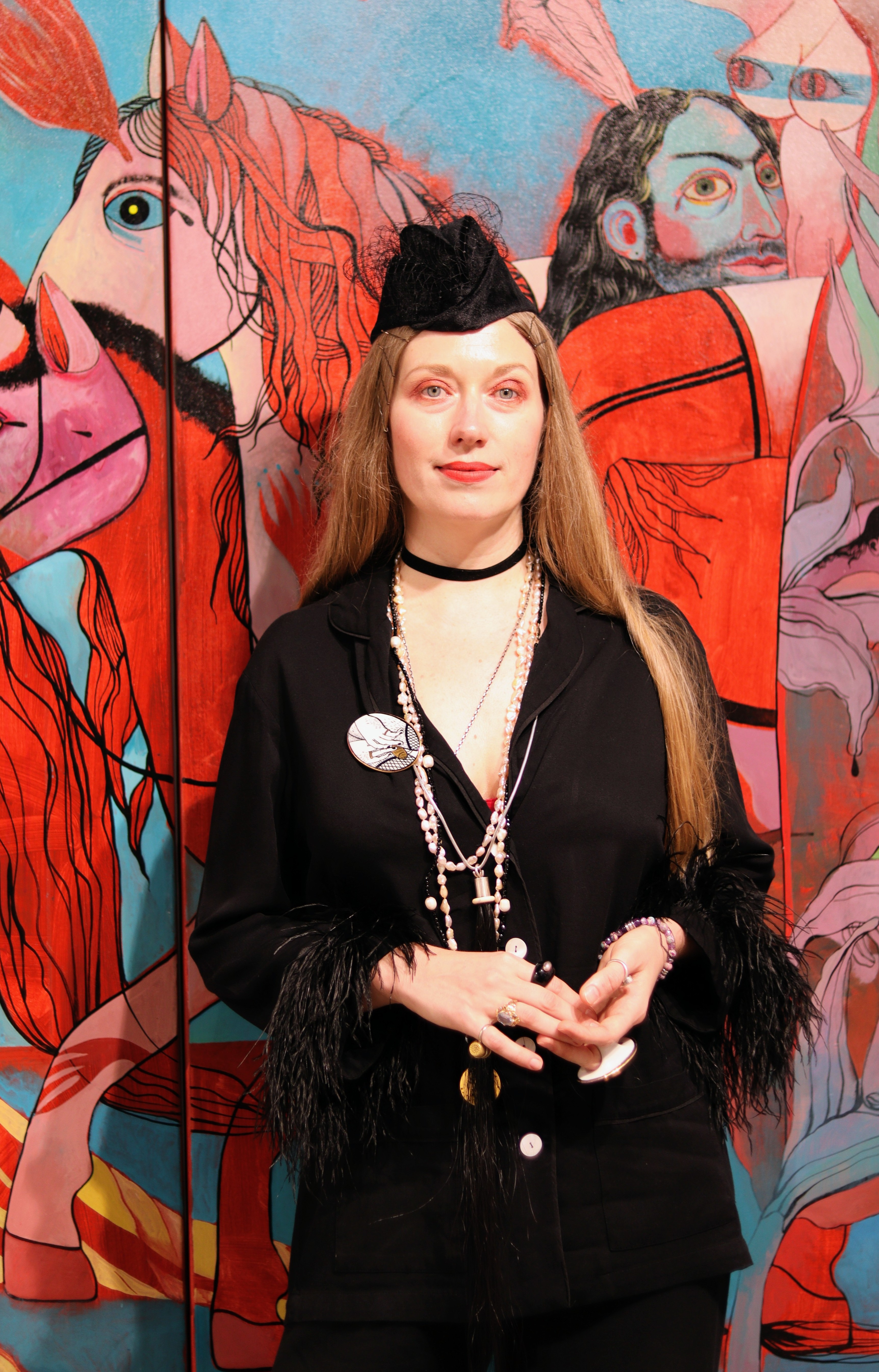
- Murashkina at Volta Basel, 2025
- Born: January 3, 1985 (age 41); Donetsk, USSR
- Education: Kharkiv State Academy of Design and Arts, National Academy of Visual Arts and Architecture, Kyiv; Jan Matejko Academy of Fine Arts, Kraków
- Known for: Painting, Installation art
- Awards: Fomento de las Artes y del Diseño A-FAD Award (2023); Gaude Polonia Grant (2012)
- Website: ninamurashkina.com

Nina Murashkina (born 3 January 1985) is a Ukrainian contemporary artist whose practice includes figurative art, installation art, and mixed media. Her work has been exhibited domestically and internationally, including at Odessa Fine Art Museum at Ukraine, NordArt in Germany, Cromwell Place gallery complex in the United Kingdom, and the Museu del Disseny de Barcelona in Spain. In 2023, she received the Art FAD Award for her project Still Waters Run Deep.

Murashkina has described her approach as "magical feminism", incorporating symbolic imagery, references to Ukrainian folk traditions, and representations of the female body.

== Biography ==
Murashkina was born in 1985 in Donetsk, Ukraine. She studied graphics at the Donetsk Art College, monumental painting at the Kharkiv State Academy of Design and Arts, and stage design at the National Academy of Fine Arts and Architecture in Kyiv.

In 2012, she completed an artistic residency at the Jan Matejko Academy of Fine Arts in Kraków, Poland, through the Gaude Polonia scholarship program. During the residency, she worked under the supervision of Polish artist and professor Andrzej Bednarczyk.

In 2017, she married sculptor Xavier Escala, which led to collaborative art projects in Spain and the United States.

She currently lives and works in Spain.

== Awards ==
In 2023, Murashkina received the Best Design of the Year award at the A-FAD Art Awards in Barcelona for her ceramic series Still Waters Run Deep, selected from among 33 finalists. According to La Vanguardia, the jury highlighted the work's "formal strength in its entirety, clarity of the discourse, gaze and the narrative on desire, and the fusion of traditional techniques with a contemporary resolution." The jury also noted that Murashkina "bases her work on a 'magic feminism', a sensual and metaphorical world built on her own sexuality and life experiences."

== Style and themes ==
Murashkina describes her artistic approach as "magical feminism", a visual language that incorporates symbolic imagery, elements of folk tradition, and representations of the female body. Her work emphasizes intuition, eroticism, and ritual, and has been interpreted as offering an alternative to overtly political feminist approaches by centering personal mythology and embodied experience.

She garners inspiration from archaic matriarchy, femininity, and magical feminism. Her style combines elements of kitsch and symbolism, and draws influence from a range of artists and writers, including Annette Messager, Catherine Breillat, Louise Bourgeois, Grayson Perry, Niki de Saint Phalle, Maria Prymachenko, and Gabriel García Márquez.

== Solo exhibitions ==
- Her Beasts, John David Mooney Foundation, Chicago (2025)
- Water Drops on Burning Rocks (duo with Xavier Escala), Rukh Art Hub / Mriya Gallery, New York (2024)
- NAXOS (duo with Xavier Escala), Відкриття мистецького простору Unlimited Art Space у Ніцці (2024)
- Apple and Needle, Eye Sea Gallery, Kyiv, Ukraine (2024). Exhibition page
- Your Sweet Lies, Lysenko Gallery, Ukrainian Cultural Center, Paris (2023)
- Somniadors (duo with Xavier Escala), Capella de Sant Joan, Vilafranca del Penedès (2023)
- Dreamers (duo with Xavier Escala), Test Gallery, Barcelona (2023)
- Altar of My Dreams, Rukh Art Hub (online show, 2022)
- Love Me More, Biruchiy Contemporary Art Project, Ukraine (2021)
- LYSISTRATA, Korsak Museum of Contemporary Ukrainian Art, Lutsk, Ukraine (2020)
- On the Top!, Yermilov Center, Kharkiv (2018)

== Group exhibitions ==
- 2025 — "A Gaze through Reality", Lavra Art Gallery, Kyiv, Ukraine.
- 2025 — "My Fairy Tale", Ruzy Gallery, Istanbul, Turkey.
- 2024 — "Kronos Festival", Palau Martorell, Barcelona, Spain.
- 2024 — "NordArt" (25th anniversary), Budelsdorf, Germany.
- 2024 — "LÁGE D'OR", Valid World Hall, Barcelona, Spain.
- 2024 — "SHERO", Rukh Art Hub (New York, USA).
- 2023 — "Diamond Jam", First Ukrainian Gallery, New York, USA.
- 2023 — Gallery "Sonya" project, The Pavilion at Century Park, Los Angeles, USA.
- 2023 — "Resistance Path", Helms Design Center, Los Angeles, USA.
- 2023 — "Ukrainian Art Auction", Cromwell Place, London, United Kingdom.
- 2022 — "Ukraine Exhibition", Port Gallery, Barcelona, Spain.
- 2022 — "NordArt", Budelsdorf, Germany.
- 2022 — "Artists Against War", Palo Alto, Barcelona, Spain.
- 2021 — "Time Is Not Wasted", Biruchiy 021, Zaporizhia, Ukraine.
- 2021 — "Kronos Festival", Santa Monica Exhibition Center, Barcelona, Spain.
- 2021 — "NordArt", Budelsdorf, Germany.
- 2020 — "Univers intim", Chapel of Sant Joan, Vilafranca del Penedès, Spain.
- 2019 — "NordArt", Budelsdorf, Germany.
- 2019 — "Intro", Korsak's Museum of Ukrainian Modern Art, Lutsk, Ukraine.
- 2018 — "Contemporary Art Women", Institute of Contemporary Art Problems, National Academy of Arts of Ukraine, Kyiv.
- 2018 — "The GODDESS" (with Xavier Escala), Sala dels Trinitaris, Vilafranca del Penedès, Spain.
- 2018 — "Marry Me!" Women's project, Museum of Kyiv History, Kyiv, Ukraine.
- 2018 — "Forbidden Dreams" performance (with Xavier Escala), Arteria BCN Gallery, Barcelona, Spain.
- 2018 — "Imaginary Identities: To Be or Not To Be?", Yermilov Art Center, Kharkiv, Ukraine.
- 2018 — "Hypnosis" residency project, Xavier Escala Studio, Sant Cugat Sesgarrigues, Spain.
- 2018 — BIRUCHIY International Contemporary Art Symposium, Biryuchy Island, Ukraine.
- 2018 — Women's Project, Nicholas Treadwell Gallery, Vienna, Austria.
- 2018 — "Artists Childhood", Mystetskyi Arsenal, Kyiv, Ukraine.
- 2016 — Kunstlersommer Ottensheim, Honzik Gallery, Aigen, Austria.
- 2016 — "Heritage", ICA Problems Institute, Kyiv, Ukraine.
- 2016 — "Involved in Beauty", Countess Uvarova Mansion, Kyiv, Ukraine.
- 2016 — Women's Project, Chocolate House, Kyiv, Ukraine.
- 2016 — "ErgoSum", Dukat Gallery, Kyiv, Ukraine.
- 2015 — "GreenLife", ICA Problems Institute, Kyiv, Ukraine.
- 2015 — Chun Gallery International Contemporary Art Exhibition, Shanghai, China.
- 2015 — BIRUCHY International Symposium, Biryuchy Island, Ukraine.
- 2015 — "Independence Coefficient", American House, Kyiv, Ukraine.
- 2015 — "Practice of Modifications", ICA Problems Institute, Kyiv, Ukraine.
- 2012 — *Neofolk Project* at Ya Gallery as part of the Gogolfest 2012 program, Kyiv, Ukraine.
- 2011 — *Genofond Pinakothek* exhibition series, Vilnius Art Academy / Lviv Palace of Arts, Lithuania and Ukraine.
- 2011 — *The Guests* exhibition at Ya Gallery Art Center, Kyiv, Ukraine.
- 2011 — *Syuzheti (Stories)* group exhibition, Ya Gallery Art Center, Kyiv, Ukraine.
- 2010 — *The Place* exhibition at Ya Gallery Art Center, Kyiv, Ukraine.
- 2010 — *Babyboom* group exhibition, Ya Gallery Art Center, Kyiv, Ukraine.
