= Here and Now (1992 TV series) =

American comedy television series

- Genre: Sitcom
- Created by: Tracy Gamble; Jerry Perzigian; Don Seigel; Richard Vaczy
- Written by: Walter Allen Bennett, Jr. Bill Boulware; Tracy Gamble; Barry Gurstein; Brian Kahn; Mike Milligan; Jay Moriarty; Jerry Perzigian; Marco Pennette; David Pitlik; Don Siegel; Richard Vaczy
- Directed by: John Bowab
- Starring: Malcolm-Jamal Warner; Charles Brown; S. Epatha Merkerson; Daryl "Chill" Mitchell; Rachael Crawford; Jessica Stone; Pee Wee Love; Shaun Weiss
- Opening theme: "Tennessee" by Arrested Development
- Composer: Stu Gardner
- Country of origin: United States
- Original language: English
- No. of seasons: 1
- No. of episodes: 15 (2 unaired)

Production
- Executive producers: Bill Cosby; George E. Crosby; Tracy Gamble; Mike Milligan; Jay Moriarty; Richard Vaczy
- Producers: Barry Gurstein; David Pitlik
- Camera setup: Videotape; Multi-camera
- Running time: 23 minutes
- Production companies: SAH Productions, Inc. NBC Productions

Original release
- Network: NBC
- Release: September 19, 1992 – January 2, 1993

Here and Now is an American sitcom television series that aired on NBC from September 19, 1992, to January 2, 1993. The series starred Malcolm-Jamal Warner in the lead role, who prior to this series co-starred in The Cosby Show which ended its run in April 1992. Bill Cosby served as one of the show's executive producers along with Warner serving as executive consultant credited as M.J. Warner. The song "Tennessee" by Arrested Development was used as the show's theme song.

== Synopsis ==
Alexander "A.J." James (Malcolm-Jamal Warner) is a recent college graduate who majored in psychology now attending post graduate school. He returns to his old neighborhood in Harlem to become a counselor at a local youth center. While working at the center he is living with Sidney (Charles Brown), his non-biological uncle who works as a doorman for a living. The series co-stars included S. Epatha Merkerson as Ms. St. Marth as the head of the youth center (Brenda Pressley played the role in the pilot episode), Daryl "Chill" Mitchell as T, a former delinquent now working at the center, Rachael Crawford as Danielle, Sidney's daughter, A.J's "cousin" and occasional love interest and Jessica Stone as Amy a fellow post grad student attending the same school as A.J., also working at the center. Pee Wee Love and Shaun Weiss also co-starred as A.J.'s counselees, Randall and William respectively.

The series bore many similarities with Warner's previous series The Cosby Show, mostly in relation to Warner's characters. Theo Huxtable on The Cosby Show and A.J. on this series were both psychology majors and worked at youth centers. Warner stated that difference between A.J. and Theo was that A.J. was "more hip and street wise".

== Cast ==
- Malcolm-Jamal Warner as Alexander "A.J." James
- Charles Brown as "Uncle" Sydney
- S. Epatha Merkerson as Claudia St. Marth
- Daryl Mitchell as T
- Rachael Crawford as Danielle
- Jessica Stone as Amy
- Pee Wee Love as Ramdall Freeman
- Shaun Weiss as William

== Broadcast history ==
The series aired on Saturday nights on NBC premiering on September 19, 1992, leading off the network's Saturday night lineup at the time. It was ultimately canceled on January 2, 1993, due to low ratings with two episodes unaired out of the fifteen episodes that were produced. Bill Cosby later admitted that he felt the show's cancellation was justified due to the series not being very well written.

== Episodes ==
No.	Title	Directed by	Written by	Original release date
1	"Pilot"	Unknown	Unknown	September 19, 1992
2	"Lovers and Other Dangers"	Unknown	Unknown	September 26, 1992
3	"Trust Me"	John Bowab	Mike Milligan & Jay Moriarty	October 3, 1992
4	"One on Won"	John Bowab	Brian Kahn	October 10, 1992
5	"Guess Who's Coming to the Center"	Unknown	Unknown	October 17, 1992
6	"A Halloween Kiss (a.k.a. The Halloween Show)"	Unknown	Unknown	October 31, 1992
7	"Love Handles"	John Bowab	Bill Boulware	November 14, 1992
8	"Great Expectations"	John Bowab	Unknown	November 21, 1992
9	"A.J.'s Big Leap"	John Bowab	Barry Gurstein & David Pitlik	November 28, 1992
10	"Take My Grandparents... Please!"	Unknown	Unknown	December 5, 1992
11	"Blacksliding"	Unknown	Unknown	December 12, 1992
12	"Pre-Ring Circus"	Unknown	Unknown	January 2, 1993
13	"Pennies from Heaven"	N/A	N/A	Unaired
