= Pale Saints (film) =

- Directed by: Joel Wyner
- Written by: Joel Wyner
- Produced by: Ilana Frank
- Starring: Sean Patrick Flanery; Michael Riley; Saul Rubinek; Rachael Crawford
- Cinematography: Barry Stone
- Edited by: Nick Rotundo
- Music by: Ian Thomas
- Production companies: Frequency Films; Telefilm Canada
- Distributed by: New Films International; Norstar Entertainment
- Release date: 1997
- Running time: 90 minutes
- Countries: Canada; United States
- Language: English

Pale Saints is a 1997 American-Canadian crime film, written and directed by Joel Wyner. The film stars Sean Patrick Flanery as Louis and Michael Riley as Dody, small-time thugs trying to gain acceptance with an organized crime group by driving to Toronto for a crime job that goes catastrophically wrong.

The film's cast also includes Saul Rubinek, Rachael Crawford, Maury Chaykin, Gordon Pinsent, Jason Blicker, Julian Richings, Hardee T. Lineham and Patrick Gallagher.

The film received five Genie Award nominations at the 19th Genie Awards, for Best Director (Wyner), Best Supporting Actor (2: Riley, Rubinek), Best Supporting Actress (Crawford) and Best Costume Design (Tamara Winston).
