= Bailey's Cafe =

1992 novel by Gloria Naylor

- Cover art of the paperback edition
- Author: Gloria Naylor
- Language: English
- Genre: novel
- Publisher: Vintage
- Publication date: 1992
- Publication place: United States
- Media type: Print
- Pages: 240 pp
- ISBN: 0679748210

Bailey's Café is a 1992 novel by award-winning American author Gloria Naylor. The novel consists of a loosely intertwined group of stories, all told in first person, about the owners and patrons of Bailey's Cafe, an apparently supernatural establishment, set nominally in New York City, whose entrance can be found from different places and times.

== Plot summary and settings ==
The unnamed owner of Bailey's Cafe (he is called "Bailey" as a nickname) acquires the cafe after his return from World War II and claims that it is magical and it saved him. Though the cafe is nominally set in New York City as per Naylor's earlier novel Mama Day, patrons wander into it from different times and places. The cafe also has a back door that apparently opens onto infinity (or death). The stories he tells include his own and his wife, Nadine's, as well as those of several of the patrons of the cafe who live in a nearby brownstone including Eve (who owns the brownstone down the street that harbors mostly fugitive women and serves as a bordello), Ester (the victim of sexual and emotional abuse), "Miss Maple" (a male cross-dresser), Jessie Bell (a bisexual drug-addict), Mary (a self-mutilated beauty), and Mariam (a mentally challenged, pregnant, virgin, teenager). Each person's back story is told by the owner as they come into the cafe.

Bailey frames the first-person narrative of each character but one: Nadine opens and closes the story of Mariam (Mary).

== Characters ==
- "Bailey" – the principal narrator. A World War II veteran and nominal owner of the cafe, Bailey (which is not his real name) is the cook.
- Nadine – the owner's wife and cashier in the cafe. Nadine frames the story of Mariam.
- Gabe – a Russian Jew and owner of the pawn shop that adjoins the cafe.
- Sadie – a homeless prostitute and alcoholic, who is also, according to Bailey, "a lady". Sadie was forced into prostitution at the age of 13, then married a poor taciturn man 30 years her senior. After his death she returns to prostitution, is arrested, loses her house, and is eventually evicted from a women's shelter because she will not take public assistance funds. She wanders into Bailey's Cafe from the South Side of Chicago. When the verbose Iceman asks the mostly silent Sadie to marry him, she refuses, believing she will only bring him pain.
- Iceman – works around Bailey's Cafe delivering ice. He proposes marriage to Sadie, but is rejected.
- Eve – formerly homeless, Eve owns the brownstone down the street that harbors mostly fugitive women, and also serves as a brothel, where the principal characters (sans the narrator and his wife) live.
- Ester – the victim of sexual abuse and emotional abuse.
- Mary ("Peaches") – a self-mutilated beauty.
- Jessie Bell – a bisexual drug-addict and "fallen woman".
- "Mariam" (Mary) – a 14-year-old, mentally challenged, pregnant virgin, Ethiopian Jew, Mariam is also the victim of genital mutilation (clitorectomy). When she wanders into Gabe's pawn shop he takes her directly to Bailey's, even though the two men do not get along. Mariam lives at Eve's.
- "Miss Maple" (Stanley Beckwourth Booker T. Washington Carver: no surname is given) – a male cross-dresser and former conscientious objector who served time in prison for refusing to fight, Miss Maple has a Ph.D. specializing in marketing analysis but works as housekeeper and bouncer for Eve. Born into a rowdy, rich, and powerful African American, Southern California family, Miss Maple came to Bailey's after many failed attempts to find employment in his field during which he began wearing women's clothes, supposedly due to the heat.

Note: none of the characters have surnames. All characters excepting Gabe (who is Jewish) and Mariam (who is an African) are presented as African American.

== Themes ==
In an interview with The Seattle Times, Naylor explained that "the underlying theme [of Bailey's Cafe] is how people define femaleness and female sexuality, how women have been cast in sexual roles since Eve." Thus, the guests at Eve's boarding house do not fit the "easy sexual labels" used to control women's bodies. Another theme within Bailey's Cafe is the combination of collective and individuals traumas throughout World War II. Bailey's references of various key battle locations such as Guam, Pearl Harbor, Japan, and more allude to the fact that the violence was a collective experience from multiple characters and the general American population during wartime.

Bailey's Cafe is the first of Naylor's novels to spotlight male characters. "Bailey", the owner of the café, frames the patrons’ stories with his running commentary as well as narrates the story of his courtship of Nadine, his wife. In addition, Miss Maples, a cross-dressing male housekeeper and bouncer, tells the story of why he came to wearing dresses. This shift in Naylor’s exclusive interest in the stories of women has been interpreted as her desire “to portray a different kind of male identity as well as . . . to cultivate a different relationship with her male characters."

== Critical reception ==
Bailey's Cafe, which is sometimes referred to as a collection of interrelated short stories, has been well received by critics.

== Adaptation ==
Gloria Naylor worked with director Novella Nelson to adapt Bailey's Cafe for the stage. Bailey's Cafe the play was produced by the Hartford Stage in March and April 1994.

== Further references ==
- Buehler, Dorothea. "Below the Surface: Female Sexuality in Gloria Naylor's Bailey's Café. Amerikastudien / American Studies 56.3 (2011): 425–448.
- Brown, Amy Benson. "Writing Home: The Bible and Gloria Naylor's Bailey's Cafe." Homemaking: Women Writers and the Politics and Poetics of Home. Ed. Catherine Wiley and Fiona Barnes. New York: Garland, 1996. 23–42.
- Chavanelle, Sylvie. "Gloria Naylor's Bailey's Cafe: The Blues and Beyond." American Studies International 36.2 (1998): 58–73.
- diPace, Angela. "Gloria Naylor's Bailey's Cafe: A Panic Reading of Bailey's Narrative." The Critical Response to Gloria Naylor. Ed. Sharon Felton and Michelle C. Loris. Connecticut: Greenwood Press, 1997.194-99.
- Montgomery, Maxine L. "Authority, Multivocality, and the New World Order in Gloria Naylor's Bailey's Cafe." African American Review 29.1 (1995): 27–33. Reprinted in The Critical Response to Gloria Naylor. Ed. Sharon Felton and Michelle C. Loris. Connecticut: Greenwood Press, 1997. 187-94.
- Nash, William R. "The Dream Defined: Bailey's Cafe and the Reconstruction of American Cultural Identities." The Critical Response to Gloria Naylor. Ed. Sharon Felton and Michelle C. Loris. Connecticut: Greenwood Press, 1997. 211–225.
- Page, Philip. "Living with the Abyss in Gloria Naylor's Bailey's Cafe." CLA Journal 40.1 (September 1996): 21–45. Reprinted in The Critical Response to Gloria Naylor. Ed. Sharon Felton and Michelle C. Loris. Connecticut: Greenwood Press, 1997. 225-39.
- Rummell, Kathryn. "From Stanley to Miss Maple: A Definition of Manhood in Gloria Naylor's Bailey's Cafe." Diversity: A Journal of Multicultural Issues 2 (1994): 90–96.
- Schneider, Karen. "Gloria Naylor's Poetics of Emancipation: (E)merging (Im)possibilities in Bailey's Cafe." Kelley, Margot Anne, ed. Gloria Naylor's Early Novels. Gainesville: University Press of Florida, 1999. 1–20.
- Thompson, Dorothy Perry. "Africana Womanist Revision in Gloria Naylor's Mama Day and Bailey's Cafe." Kelley, Margot Anne, ed. Gloria Naylor's Early Novels. Gainesville: University Press of Florida, 1999. 1–20. 89–111.
- Whitt, Margaret. "Bailey's Café as Sports Bar, or, Why Baseball Needs a Way Station." Callaloo 23.4 (Autumn 2000):1464–1474.
- Wood, Rebecca. "'Two Warring Ideals in One Dark Body': Universalism and Nationalism in Gloria Naylor's Bailey's Cafe."African American Review 30.3 (Fall 1996): 381–95. Reprinted in The Critical Response to Gloria Naylor. Ed. Sharon Felton and Michelle C. Loris. Connecticut: Greenwood Press, 1997. 240-52.
