= Brewster Place =

- Genre: Drama
- Based on: The Women of Brewster Place by Gloria Naylor
- Written by: Maya Angelou; Paul W. Cooper; Earl Hamner, Jr. Dianne Houston; Don Sipes
- Directed by: Ivan Dixon; Jan Eliasberg; Bill Duke; Helaine Head
- Starring: Oprah Winfrey; Brenda Pressley; Olivia Cole; Rachael Crawford; Kelly Neal; John Cothran Jr. Oscar Brown Jr. John Speredakos; Jason Weaver
- Theme music composer: David Shire
- Opening theme: Performed by Take 6
- Composer: David Shire
- Country of origin: United States
- Original language: English
- No. of seasons: 1
- No. of episodes: 12 (2 unaired)

Production
- Executive producers: Earl Hamner, Jr. Don Sipes; Oprah Winfrey
- Producers: Reuben Cannon; Stan Kallis
- Editors: Dann Cahn; Quinnie Martin, Jr. Joe Morrisey
- Camera setup: Single-camera
- Running time: 22 minutes
- Production companies: Amanda Productions; The Don Sipes Organization; Harpo Productions; Hearst Entertainment

Original release
- Network: ABC
- Release: May 1 – July 11, 1990

Related
- The Women of Brewster Place

Brewster Place is an American drama series which aired on ABC in May 1990. The series was a spinoff of the 1989 miniseries The Women of Brewster Place, which was based upon Gloria Naylor's novel of the same name. The series starred talk show host Oprah Winfrey, who also served as co-executive producer.

== Plot ==
Set in 1967, the series begin with events following the end of the 1989 miniseries, The Women of Brewster Place. Mattie Michael (Oprah Winfrey) is fired from her job as a beautician, and agrees to purchase a neighborhood restaurant with her best friend Etta Mae (Brenda Pressley). Kiswana (Rachel Crawford), Abshu (Kelly Neal), and Miss Sophie (Olivia Cole) are still residents of Brewster Place, and various other individuals move onto the block as the series progresses.

The series was filmed entirely in Chicago, on the lot of Winfrey's Harpo Productions. It failed to capture the audience and critical acclaim of the miniseries, and was cancelled after a month. However, the full season of 12 episodes has since been released on both VHS and DVD.

== Cast ==
- Oprah Winfrey as Mattie Michael
- Rachael Crawford as Melanie "Kiswana" Browne
- Brenda Pressley as Etta Mae Johnson
- Olivia Cole as Miss Sophie
- Kelly Neal as Abshu Kamau
- John Cothran as Ralph Thomas
- Oscar Brown Jr. as Jessie
- John Speredakos as Mickey Adriano
- Jason Weaver as Matthew Thomas

== Episodes ==
No.	Title	Directed by	Written by	Original release date
1	"Pilot"	Bill Duke	Earl Hamner Jr. & Don Sipes	May 1, 1990
2	"Open for Business"	Helaine Head	Paul W. Cooper	May 8, 1990
3	"One Small Step at a Time"	Ivan Dixon	Story by : Earl Hamner Jr. & Don Sipes; Teleplay by : Dianne Houston	May 9, 1990
4	"Spring Fever"	Ivan Dixon	Dianne Houston	May 16, 1990
5	"Whatever Happened to Patience Jones?"	Ivan Dixon	Andrew Sipes	May 30, 1990
6	"Gone Fishing"	Lesli Linka Glatter	Paul W. Cooper	June 13, 1990
7	"Bernice Sands Comes Home"	Helaine Head	Dianne Houston	June 20, 1990
8	"The Poet"	Jan Eliasberg	Scott Hamner	June 27, 1990
9	"Family Album"	Helaine Head	Johnny Dawkins	July 4, 1990
10	"Say It Loud"	Roy Campanella, II	Dianne Houston	July 11, 1990
11	"Partners"	TBD	TBD	UNAIRED
12	"County General"	Helaine Head	Kathy McCormick & Dianne Houston	UNAIRED

== Ratings ==
- Episode 1: 15.3 rating/21.9 million viewers
- Episode 2: 13.2 rating
- Episode 3: 9.7 rating
- Episode 4: 10.1
- Episode 5: 9
- Episode 6: 7.6 rating/11.9 million viewers

== Reception ==
Entertainment Weekly gave the series a grade of B−, and reviewed the show mildly favorably, stating, "There's something warm and comforting about Brewster Place, and something complacent and artificial as well."
