= Kelly Neal =

American actor

Kelly Neal is an actor. He was featured in Oprah Winfrey's series Brewster Place.

== Filmography ==
- ABC Afterschool Special (1986–87) (Reggie Franklin) (2 episodes)
- A Man Called Hawk (1989) (Frank) (Intensive Care)
- True Blue (TV series) (1990) (Blue Monday)
- Brewster Place (1990) (Abshu Kamau) (11 episodes)
- Luther's Choice (1991) (Luther Payne)
- Law & Order (1990–93) (Lucian Bryan / Willie Tivnan) (2 episodes)
- Lifestories: Families in Crisis (1994) (Dealer) (Brotherly Love: The Trevor Ferrell Story)
- Shadow Box (2008) (CSI 2)
- Guiding Light (1994–96) (Sidney Dickerson)
