= Override (1994 film) =

- Directed by: Danny Glover
- Starring: Lou Diamond Phillips; Emily Lloyd
- Release date: 1994
- Country: United States

Override is a 1994 American science fiction short film. It was the directorial debut of Danny Glover and starred Lou Diamond Phillips and Emily Lloyd. It is based on the Nebula- and Hugo-nominated short story "Over the Long Haul", by Martha Soukup.

The film was part of Showtime's Directed By... series that showcased well-known Hollywood actors stepping behind the camera as first-time film directors.

Override revolves around a tractor-trailer driver.

== Music ==
The soundtrack of the film was composed by Cibo Matto.
