= Linden Hills (novel) =

1985 novel by Gloria Naylor

- Author: Gloria Naylor
- Language: English
- Published: 1985
- Publication place: United States
- Media type: Print
- ISBN: 0-14-008829-6
- Preceded by: The Women of Brewster Place
- Followed by: The Meanings of a Word

Linden Hills is a novel written by Gloria Naylor, originally published in 1985. Naylor bases her allegory on Dante's Inferno. The narrative is written from a third-person omniscient perspective, detailing different characters based on different traits that correspond with the different rings of Dante's interpretation of Hell. The novel is a revision of Naylor's Yale master’s thesis.

== Plot summary ==
Naylor begins her narrative by detailing the family history of Luther Nedeed, real estate purveyor of the Linden Hills neighborhood. Naylor exposes the American dream as nightmare, through the lens of race and class, by unraveling the dark secrets of Tupelo Drive.

== Reception ==
Critical reception has been positive. The New York Times wrote a mostly favorable review for the work, stating "Its flaws notwithstanding, the novel's ominous atmosphere and inspired set pieces - such as the minister's drunken fundamentalist sermon before an incredulous Hills congregation - make it a fascinating departure for Miss Naylor, as well as a provocative, iconoclastic novel about a seldom-addressed subject." Publishers Weekly was more critical, stating that the "narrative seems constructed and contrived rather than animated by the inner energy that distinguished Naylor's previous work. The novel as a whole is cold and preachy.''
