= María Fernanda Cuartas =

Colombian painter

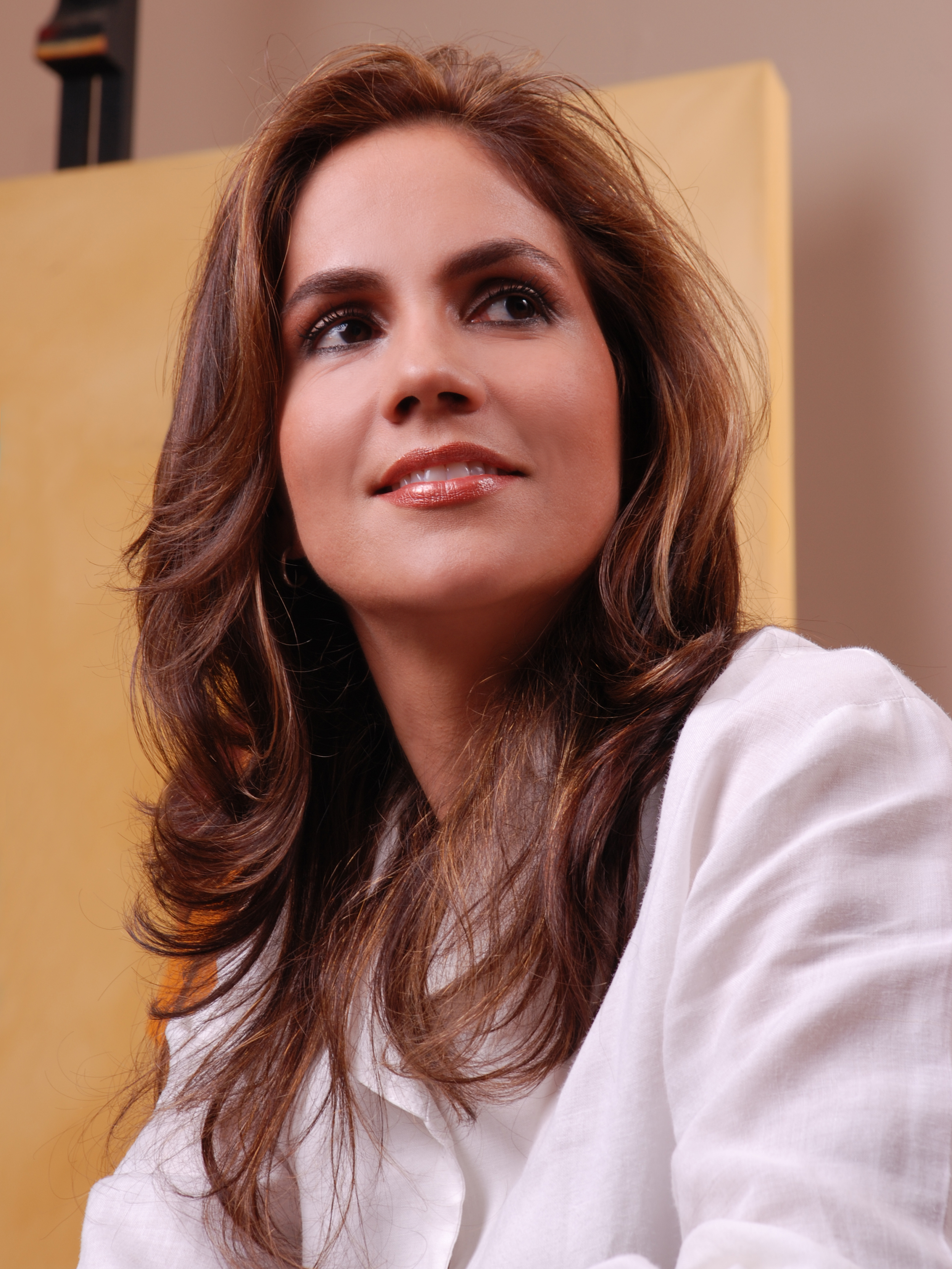
- Born: September 8, 1967 (age 58); Bogotá, Colombia
- Style: Neo-figurative art

Maria Fernanda Cuartas (born September 8, 1967, in Bogotá) is a Colombian painter. Cuartas was born in Bogotá and grew up in Cali, Colombia. In 2007 and again in 2010, she was listed by the Biblioteca de Artistas de las Comunidades Europeas (BACE - The Artists Library of the European Union) as one of the 100 "most important contemporary artists in the world."

== Artwork ==
Her subject matter is centered on problems in society, gender equality, and the dignity of women. Her paintings are characterized by faceless people, most often women. Her style is neo-figurative. Her work has been exhibited in the United States, Colombia, Argentina, Italy, Spain, Dubai, and Mexico. As part of an initiative organized by the Cali Chamber of Commerce to expand the El Gato del Río monument, Cuartas designed a cat sculpture titled La Gata Ingrid. The piece is inspired by the region's agricultural richness and fertile soil. Its legs and trunk represent a corn plant and its head represents a grain. In its basket, it carries pandebonos and fritters, which are characteristic of the region.

== Awards ==
The Colombian House of Representatives decorated her with the Orden de la Democracia Simón Bolívar, a civil honor, for her art. In 2020 she was commissioned to create a public sculpture for the Alfonso Bonilla Aragón International Airport to "highlight female values." The sculpture, titled "Ella" (She) has subsequently received a variety of critical responses, including highly negative critical reactions to the message that it conveys.She was included in the Guide to Museums, Galleries, and Artists in Art in America in 2011 and 2012.
