= The Women of Brewster Place (novel) =

1982 novel by Gloria Naylor

- First edition (publ. Viking)
- Author: Gloria Naylor
- Language: English
- Published: 1982
- Publication place: United States
- Media type: Print
- ISBN: 0-7868-6421-4
- Followed by: Linden Hills

The Women of Brewster Place (1982) is the debut novel of American author Gloria Naylor. It won the National Book Award in the category First Novel. It was adapted as the 1989 miniseries The Women of Brewster Place and the 1990 television show Brewster Place by Oprah Winfrey's Harpo Productions.

The book explores the lives of seven Black women who live at Brewster Place, a tenement building in the poorer parts of an unnamed US city. It examines female relationships in terms of friendship and romantic love, as well as themes of sisterhood, violence, and sexuality.

In each of the "Seven Stories" of its subtitle, one or more of the seven women are involved with the main character of that particular story, such as Mattie appearing in Etta Mae's story or Kiswana showing up in Cora Lee's.

== Plot summary ==
The women of Brewster Place are "hard-edged, soft-centered, brutally demanding, and easily pleased." Their names are Mattie Michael, Etta Mae Johnson, Lucielia "Ciel" Turner, Melanie "Kiswana" Browne, Cora Lee, Lorraine, and Theresa. Each of their lives are explored in several short stories. These short stories also chronicle the ups and downs many Black women face.

As a young teenager, Mattie Michael is impregnated by Butch, who is disdained by the community and especially Mattie's father. When her father finds out, she is beaten violently for it, and Mattie leaves home. With her newborn child Basil, she searches for a place to live. Ms. Eva, an older benevolent women, lets Mattie stay in a spare bedroom in her house rent-free. Mattie raises her son Basil in that home, and he grows up alongside Ms. Eva's granddaughter Ciel. As Basil becomes a teenager, Ms. Eva passes away and Ciel vows to never sell Ms. Eva's home. However, one night Mattie receives a call about Basil being arrested for involuntary manslaughter. Distraught at seeing Basil in prison, Mattie pays his bail and uses the house as collateral. However, unable to face trial, Basil runs away from home. Mattie realizes that she over-nurtured Basil, and he grew up unable to bear any responsibility and burden. Having lost Ms. Eva's home, a devastated Mattie moves to Brewster Place.

The second short story is about Etta Mae Johnson, Mattie's childhood friend. Etta is described as a vibrant and vivacious character who has travelled a lot and has had numerous past relationships with men. Looking for stability, Etta decides moves to Brewster Place with Mattie. She goes to church with Mattie where she meets Reverend Woods. She finds him charming and attractive; and fantasizes about having a respectable and stable relationship with him. Reverend Woods is also taken by Etta, and finding her incredibly beautiful, he take her out. However, at the end of the night, Etta is left disappointed and feeling betrayed when she realizes that the Reverend only wanted her for self-serving and sexual reasons. When she comes home, she finds that Mattie was waiting for her, and feeling comforted by Mattie's love, her mood is immediately lifted.

Kiswana Browne is the third character written about in the novel. Her original name is Melanie, but she has changed it Kiswana as an effort to identify with her African heritage. Kiswana is initially from a middle-class family, but she drops out of college and moves to Brewster Place to be closer to the real struggles of African American people. Kiswana prepares for her mother to visit. While cleaning, she reminisces about her boyfriend Abshu, and the way he would make love to her, beginning with her feet. When Kiswana's mother arrives, she is clearly dismayed by her living conditions. She does not approve of Kiswana's decision to live at Brewster Place, seeing it as a step backwards for her family. The pair argue, and her mother tells Kiswana that she was named Melanie after her grandmother, a woman that she is proud of because she worked hard to educate all her children and give them a better life. Kiswana, moved by her mother's words, cries. At the end, she looks down at her mother's toes and sees that she is wearing bright red nail polish. Kiswana realizes this is for the same reason that she wears nail polish for Abshu. Kiswana sees her mother as a woman and realizes that the both of them are not as different as she initially thought.

Lucielia Lousie Turner, also known as Ciel, is now fully grown. She has a child Serena with her boyfriend Eugene. She also is pregnant with a second child. Eugene treats both Ciel and Serena terribly. He comes home one day and informs Ciel that he has lost his job. Frustrated that he can never get ahead, he blames Ciel for the babies and the bills and pressures her to get an abortion. Ciel struggles after the abortion, feeling possessive of Serena. Eugene comes home again with news of a job opportunity in Maine. He begins packing immediately and is in a rush to leave. He refuses to take Ciel and Serena along with him to Maine. As Ciel and Eugene argue, Serena is left alone in the house. She plays with a roach and tries to chase it with a fork. Sticking the fork into an electric socket, she electrocutes herself and dies. Ciel is grief-stricken and lifeless, looking like she is on the verge of death. However, after the funeral Mattie comforts her by holding and rocking her.

Cora Lee is obsessed with babies. After she learns about sex, she begins to have many children with many different men. However, she has a hard time caring for her children after they have grown from infancy. She enjoys taking care of her infant child but neglects the rest of her children and her home. Due to the neglect, her children are often truant, ill-mannered, barely fed, and filthily dressed. One day, Kiswana stops by the Cora Lee's place to tell her of a tenants' association she is creating. However, Kiswana is horrified to see Cora Lee's children eating out of garbage cans. In an effort to help, she invites Cora Lee and her children to see a Shakespeare play being showed in the park. After her encounter with Kiswana, Cora Lee is moved to prepare dinner for the children. She gives her children more attention, cleaning the house and finding more suitable clothes for them to wear. After watching the play, Cora Lee realizes that she needs to take better care of her children and educate them. She tucks her children into bed and kisses them good night. However, she herself gets into bed naked with an unnamed man.

Lorraine and Theresa are a lesbian couple living at Brewster Place. Although they are kind and considerate residents, many feel distrustful and scared of them. One resident, Sophie spies on them; watching their actions and spreading rumors about them. Lorraine can feel the judgement of her community members and is particularly hurt by it. Scared of being shunned and found out for being lesbian, she tries to talk to Theresa about her fears. However, Theresa shuts her down, accusing her of being unnecessarily paranoid. Theresa makes it clear that she does not care what people think of her. She feels that Lorraine is too soft and unable to fight for herself. Lorraine's soft personality, which she once found attractive, begins to annoy her. In an effort to fit in, Lorraine attends Kiswana's tenants' association meetings. However, she is quickly ostracized and attacked by Sophie for her sexuality. Ben, one of the oldest residents, consoles a deeply upset Lorraine. Ben and Lorraine begin to spend more time together. Theresa begins to notice that Lorraine is changing, becoming bolder and more firm. One night, Lorraine and Theresa fight because Lorraine feels misunderstood by Theresa. The fight ends in Lorraine leaving to go to a party without Theresa. On her way back, Lorraine is violently raped and beaten by C.C Baker and his gang, who assault her for being lesbian. Lorraine eventually gets up, badly wounded, and sees Ben. She grabs a brick and kills Ben with it.

Rain has been pouring down on Brewster Place every day since Ben's death. However, the rain stopped just in time for the tenant's association to host a block party. Ciel, who had left for California, comes back to visit Brewster Place after having a horrible dream about Lorraine. Many of the other women also share the same dream. As the Block Party progresses, the rain begins to return. Everyone leaves except for the women who notice that the walls of Brewster Place still have Ben's blood on it. They begin to frantically tear down a stained wall. Mattie wakes up, realizing that the Block Party described was only her dream. However, it is the day of the actual Block Party, and the sun is shining.

In the last chapter, titled "Dusk," Brewster Place is condemned. It is abandoned and left to die.

== Characters ==
- Mattie Michael: The novel's most prominent character in the novel. Moves to Brewster Place after her son abandons her and she loses her house.
- Butch Fuller: The father of Mattie's son.
- Samuel Michael: Mattie's father known for his calm nature. However, he almost beats Mattie to death when she refuses to reveal who the father of her baby is.
- Basil Michael: Mattie's over-indulged son. Accused of involuntary manslaughter and runs away from home after Mattie puts up her house as collateral for his bail.
- Eva Turner: An elderly woman who opens up her home to Mattie and her son.
- Etta Mae Johnson: Mattie's life-long best friend who moves to Brewster Place to settle down. Meets Reverend Woods and fantasizes about having a respectable relationship with him but is let down.
- Reverend Moreland T. Woods: A charismatic and charming preacher but ultimately fraudulent. He seduces Etta and sleeps with her.
- Kiswana Browne: Formerly named Melanie. From a middle-class family but drops out of college and moves to Brewster Place to immerse herself in African American community struggles and affect change.
- Abshu Ben-Jamal: Kiswana's boyfriend, known for directing a black production of the Shakespeare play that was attended by Cora Lee and her children.
- Mrs. Browne: Kiswana's mother, eventually seen by Kiswana as a woman proud of her heritage.
- Lucielia Lousie Turner: Also known as Ciel. Is Eva's granddaughter and grows up alongside Mattie's son. Later lives at Brewster Place with her boyfriend Eugene and their daughter Serena who tragically dies, leaving Ciel heartbroken.
- Serena: Ciel and Eugene's baby daughter. She accidentally dies by electrocution after placing a fork in an electrical outlet.
- Eugene: Ciel's selfish boyfriend. Is neglectful of Ciel or Serena.
- Cora Lee: Loves having babies but neglects them after they grow past infancy. However, she becomes resolved to nurture and educate her children after taking them to a Shakespeare play.
- Lorraine: Theresa's lesbian partner. Worries about being judged by the other members of Brewster Place. Finds comfort in Ben but later murders him after being gang raped.
- Theresa: Lorraine's lesbian partner. Bold and confident but is also disturbed by the prejudice she and Lorraine face.
- Sophie: A Brewster Place resident who constantly spies on Lorraine and Theresa and harshly attacks them for their sexuality, finding their behavior abhorrent.
- Ben: Oldest resident at Brewster Place. Moves to Brewster Place after his daughter and his wife both leave him. Lorraine reminds him of his daughter, and he develops a friendship with her but is later killed by her.
- Ben's daughter: Runs away from home after being sexually abused by the landowner, leaving Ben grieving for her.
- C.C Baker: The leader of a disruptive and violent gang of boys at Brewster Place who rapes Lorraine for being lesbian.

== Historical significance ==
The Women of Brewster Place engages with historical struggles faced by African Americans throughout different phases of history. Karen Castellucci Cox, professor at City College of San Francisco, noted that each of the characters in the novel represent different eras in African American history. She explains that Mattie is from a "defeated plantation" in the South and runs North for more freedom. Etta Mae is a product of the Harlem Renaissance because of her Billie Holiday albums, while Kiswana is a product of the 1960s Black Movement because she seeks to claim her heritage. Ciel and Cora Lee "inherit an inner-city world" that is impoverished. Lastly, Theresa and Lorraine represent contemporary oppression of their sexuality.

== Analysis ==
Black sisterhood

The novel has been noted for its exploration of Black sisterhood. In the prologue "Dawn," the female residents of Brewster place are presented as a vibrant community. At the end of the novel, even after many of the conflicts and struggles faced by the residents, Mattie dreams of block party where all the women are united. Additionally, even after Brewster Place has been condemned and abandoned, the spirit of the women is described as still living on. In the novel, Naylor uses Brewster Place as a unifying setting, the close contact it offers cultivating female friendship.

Larry Andrews published an article on The Women in the College Language Association journal. He wrote that one way that sisterhood is formed in the novel is through the women's shared experiences of motherhood. One of the problems that several mothers in the novel face is their overly nurturing attitude towards their children. A prominent example of this is Mattie. She mothers excessively, tying herself to Basil and absolving him of any real responsibility. Consequently, when he runs away from home because he cannot endure hardship, Mattie realizes her mistake. However, Mattie's mothering nature does have positive effects. She is portrayed as a mother-figure to many of the women at Brewster Place. For example, when Ciel loses her daughter, Mattie cradles and rocks her, taking care of her. Motherhood strengthens the bond between Mattie and Ciel.

Andrews also points out that another possible explanation for the strength of sisterhood is because of the lack of love that many of the women find from men. Examples include Mattie's enraged and violent father, Lorraine's father rejecting her for her sexuality, Reverend Woods' hypocrisy, Eugene leaving Ciel, and C.C Baker violently raping Lorraine.

Dreams and deferral

Naylor opens the novel with Langston Hughes' poem "A Dream Deferred." Throughout the novel, she explores the poem, most explicitly in the last chapter, when Mattie dreams of a block party. Jill Matus, professor of English at the University of Toronto, asserts that Mattie's dream is an example of closure being deferred because the novel never illustrates the real block party. Matus says that the end is a reimagining of Hughes' poem.

Moreover, Mattie dreams of Ciel coming back to visit. In her dream, Ciel comes back to Brewster Place because she dreams that something traumatic has happened. However, Matus offers that another explanation for why Mattie dreams of Ciel could be a wish to see her heal after the pain of her daughter's death. However, although Ciel is present in Mattie's dream, Basil is not. This is possibly because Mattie realizes that Basil is beyond hope whereas Ciel is not.

Everyone in the community knows that block party is an important and significant way to move past the tragedy of Lorraine and Ben. However, Mattie's dream ends destructively. The women begin to tear at the bricks holding up Brewster Place, believing it to still have Ben's blood on it. The women vent their frustrations by hurling the bricks. The women unite together in a cathartic experience. Mattie wakes up from her dream to a sunny day outside, and the book ends. As literary critic Frederic Jameson puts it, the dream at the end of the novel is a "symbolic act" that enables "real social contradictions, insurmountable in their own terms, [to] find a purely formal resolution in the aesthetic realm."

Additionally, Matus suggests that Ben's death can be interpreted as Lorraine's deferred and long-due act of self-assertion. This suggests that deferrals of dreams accumulate only hurt, anger, and violence. Often this violence is displaced onto underserving targets, such as Lorraine killing Ben. Consequently, it is possible that the block party is only dreamt and not realized in the novel because it resulted in violence and destruction.

== Musical adaptation ==
A new musical adaptation of The Women of Brewster Place was commissioned for the stage. The musical premiered at the Alliance Theatre in Atlanta, Georgia, on September 12, 2007, the same theatre that also co-produced the show itself. It was directed by Molly Smith. The Women of Brewster Place toured several cities, opening to several positive reviews.
