= The Women of Brewster Place (miniseries) =

1989 miniseries directed by Donna Deitch

- Genre: Drama
- Based on: The Women of Brewster Place by Gloria Naylor
- Teleplay by: Karen Hall
- Directed by: Donna Deitch
- Starring: Oprah Winfrey; Robin Givens; Jackée; Paul Winfield; Lynn Whitfield; Mary Alice; Lonette McKee; Leon; Larenz Tate; Cicely Tyson; Moses Gunn; Shari Belafonte; Phyllis Yvonne Stickney
- Music by: David Shire
- Country of origin: United States
- Original language: English

Production
- Executive producers: Carole Isenberg; Oprah Winfrey
- Producers: Reuben Cannon; Patricia K. Meyer
- Production locations: Chicago, Illinois
- Cinematography: Alexander Gruszynski
- Editor: Jerrold L. Ludwig
- Running time: 178 minutes
- Production companies: Harpo Productions; Phoenix Entertainment Group

Original release
- Network: ABC
- Release: March 19 – March 20, 1989

The Women of Brewster Place is an American television miniseries that was broadcast on March 19 and 20, 1989 on ABC. The miniseries is based upon the critically acclaimed 1982 novel of the same name by Gloria Naylor. It was produced by Oprah Winfrey's Harpo Productions with a teleplay by Karen Hall. The show's theme song was performed by American R&B singer Vesta Williams, who performed both the opening and closing credits.

The miniseries stars an ensemble cast of African-American actors and actresses such as Winfrey, Cicely Tyson, Jackée Harry, Robin Givens, Lynn Whitfield, Paula Kelly, Lonette McKee, Paul Winfield, Mary Alice, Olivia Cole, Moses Gunn, William Allen Young, and Larenz Tate.

In 1990, it was adapted into a weekly series entitled Brewster Place.

== Plot ==
Mattie Michael resides on a farm with her parents. After she becomes pregnant by local womanizer Butch Fuller, Mattie leaves home and stays with her friend Etta Mae Johnson until her son Basil is born. When Etta Mae moves to New York City, Mattie struggles to find another place to live. By chance, she meets an old woman, Miss Eva Turner, who allows Mattie and Basil to live with her, and her baby granddaughter Ciel. When Miss Eva dies unexpectedly, Ciel's parents reappear, and take her with them. Mattie buys the house, using the money she secretly set aside for the rent that Miss Eva never charged.

Basil grows into a spoiled, irresponsible young man due to Mattie's overbearing parenting. One night Basil is arrested and thrown in jail for killing a man during a bar fight. Mattie puts up her house as bail for Basil, but when he flees town, Mattie is forced to leave her home.

With nowhere else to go, she moves to Brewster Place, a run-down urban tenement, where she is welcomed by the now-adult Ciel and her infant daughter Serena. Mattie helps Ciel deal with her itinerant husband, Gene, who rejects the prospect of a second baby, resulting in Ciel's having an abortion.

Other residents of Brewster Place include Ben, the elderly handyman; Cora Lee, a welfare mother with six unruly children by different fathers; Miss Sophie, an elderly self-righteous gossip; and a young educated couple, Melanie "Kiswana" Browne and her boyfriend Abshu. Each of these characters have their own subplots which occasionally intersect with Mattie. Melanie and Abshu start a tenants' association to take action against the landlord for lack of building maintenance.

A lesbian couple, Lorraine and Theresa, move into Brewster Place and are victims of Miss Sophie's homophobia. Lorraine is raped by drug dealer C.C. Baker, who leaves her, bleeding and battered, behind the trash cans near the brick wall. Ben discovers Lorraine and attempts to help her. But Lorraine, traumatized from the attack, mistakes him for C.C. and attacks him with a board. She holds off all the other residents until the ambulance arrives. Both she and an unconscious Ben are driven away with Tee, who is alerted by a neighbor. Mattie, whose anger has finally overcome her apathy towards life, grabs a crowbar and starts to chip away at the much-despised brick wall. All the other residents grab tools and, finally coming together as a community, join together in knocking down the wall.

== Cast ==
- Oprah Winfrey as Mattie Michael
- Robin Givens as Melanie "Kiswana" Browne
- Jackée as Etta Mae Johnson
- Lynn Whitfield as Lucielia "Ciel" Turner
- Paula Kelly as Theresa
- Lonette McKee as Lorraine
- Olivia Cole as Miss Sophie
- Phyllis Yvonne Stickney as Cora Lee
- Moses Gunn as Ben, The Handyman
- William Allen Young as Eugene, Ciel's Husband
- Leon as Abshu, Kiswana's Boyfriend
- Douglas Turner Ward as Reverend Woods
- Glenn Plummer as C.C. Baker
- Barbara Montgomery as Miss Eva Turner, Ciel's Grandmother
- Eugene Lee as Basil, Mattie's Son
- Paul Winfield as Sam Michael, Mattie's Father
- Mary Alice as Fannie Michael, Mattie's Mother
- Cicely Tyson as Mrs. Browne, Kiswana's Mother
- Larenz Tate as Sammy, Cora Lee's Son

== Ratings ==
Viewership and ratings per episode of The Women of Brewster Place
| No. | Title | Air date | Timeslot (ET) | Rating/share (households) | Viewers (millions) | Ref(s) |
|---|---|---|---|---|---|---|
| 1 | "Part 1" | March 19, 1989 | Sunday 9:00 p.m. | 23.5/36 | 35.7 | |
| 2 | "Part 2" | March 20, 1989 | Monday 9:00 p.m. | 24.5/38 | 37.4 | |

== Awards and nominations ==
| Year | Award | Category | Nominee | Result | Ref |
|---|---|---|---|---|---|
| 1989 | 41st Primetime Emmy Awards | Outstanding Supporting Actress in a Limited Series or Movie | Paula Kelly | Nominated | |
| 1989 | 41st Primetime Emmy Awards | Outstanding Miniseries | | Nominated | |
| 1989 | Casting Society of America | Best Casting for TV Miniseries | Eileen Mack Knight | Nominated | |
| 1990 | GLAAD Media Award for Outstanding TV Movie or Limited Series | Outstanding TV Mini-Series | | Won | |
| 1991 | NAACP Image Awards | Outstanding Drama Series, Mini-Series or Television Movie | | Won | |
