= Gloria Naylor =

American novelist (1950–2016)

- Born: January 25, 1950; New York, U.S.
- Died: September 28, 2016 (aged 66); Christiansted, U.S. Virgin Islands, U.S.
- Occupation: Novelist
- Notable work: The Women of Brewster Place; Linden Hills; Mama Day; 1996
- Awards: National Book Award

Gloria Naylor (January 25, 1950 – September 28, 2016) was an American novelist, known for novels including The Women of Brewster Place (1982), Linden Hills (1985) and Mama Day (1988).

== Early life and education ==
Naylor was born in New York on January 25, 1950, the oldest child of Roosevelt Naylor and Alberta McAlpin. The Naylors, who had been sharecroppers in Robinsonville, Mississippi, had migrated to Harlem to escape life in the segregated South and seek new opportunities in New York City. Her father became a transit worker; her mother, a telephone operator. Even though Naylor's mother had little education, she loved to read, and encouraged her daughter to read and keep a journal. Before her teen years, Gloria began writing prodigiously, filling many notebooks with observations, poems, and short stories.

In 1963, Naylor's family moved to Queens and her mother joined the Jehovah's Witnesses. An outstanding student who read voraciously, Naylor was placed into advanced classes in high school, where she immersed herself in the work of nineteenth-century British novelists. Her educational aspirations, however, were delayed by the shock of the assassination of Martin Luther King Jr. in her senior year. She postponed her college education, becoming a missionary for the Jehovah's Witnesses in New York, North Carolina, and Florida instead. She left seven years later as "things weren't getting better, but worse."

From 1975 to 1981, Naylor attended Medgar Evers College and then Brooklyn College of the City University of New York, while working as a telephone operator, majoring in nursing before switching to English, earning her bachelor's degree in 1981. It was at that time that she read Toni Morrison's 1970 novel The Bluest Eye, which was a pivotal experience for Naylor. She began to avidly read the work of Zora Neale Hurston, Alice Walker, and other black women novelists, none of which she had been exposed to previously. She earned an M.A. degree in African-American studies at Yale University in 1983; her thesis eventually became her second published novel, Linden Hills.

Naylor was an honorary member of Delta Sigma Theta sorority.

== Career ==
Naylor's debut novel, The Women of Brewster Place, was published in 1982 and won the 1983 National Book Award in the category First Novel. It was adapted as a 1989 television miniseries of the same name by Oprah Winfrey's Harpo Productions.

Naylor's work is featured in such anthologies as Breaking Ice: An Anthology of Contemporary African-American Fiction (ed. Terry McMillan, 1990), Calling the Wind: Twentieth-Century African-American Short Stories (ed. Clarence Major, 1992) and Daughters of Africa (ed. Margaret Busby, 1992).

During her career as a professor, Naylor taught writing and literature at several universities, including George Washington University, New York University, Boston University, University of Kent, University of Pennsylvania and Cornell University.

In 1989 Naylor was the Zale Writer-In-Residence at Newcomb College of Tulane University. There she performed a reading of her works as well as being publicly interviewed by Filipe Smith of the Tulane English Department.

Her last novel, 1996, was published by Third World Press in 2005. In the fictionalized memoir, she wrote about being surveilled and harassed by the NSA. "But they now have technology that is able to decode the brain patterns, and to detect what people are actually thinking," she said in an interview with NPR about her novel. "And they have another technology called microwave hearing, where they can actually input words into your head, bypassing your ears."

In 2009, Naylor donated her archives to Sacred Heart University. The collection was loaned to Lehigh University for digitization.

Naylor died of a heart attack on September 28, 2016, while visiting St. Croix, United States Virgin Islands. She was 66.

In 2019, Sapphira Wade, an unfinished manuscript from Naylor's archive, was published online and in African American Review.

== Influence ==
During her studies at Brooklyn College, Naylor became immersed in the works of African-American female authors such as Zora Neale Hurston, Alice Walker, and especially Toni Morrison. Drawing inspiration from these authors, Naylor began writing stories centered on the lives of African-American women, which resulted in her 1982 first novel, The Women of Brewster Place.

== Works ==
- The Women of Brewster Place (1982), ISBN 0-7868-6421-4
- Linden Hills (1985), ISBN 0-14-008829-6
- The Meanings of a Word (1986)
- Mama Day (1988), ISBN 0-89919-716-7
- Bailey's Cafe (1992), ISBN 0-15-110450-6
- Children of the Night: The Best Short Stories by Black Writers, 1967 to the Present (1995), ISBN 0-316-59926-3 (editor)
- The Men of Brewster Place (1999), ISBN 0-7868-8405-3
- 1996 (2005), ISBN 0-88378-263-4

== The Women of Brewster Place ==
Gloria Naylor won critical and popular acclaim for her first published novel, The Women of Brewster Place. In that book, as in her successive novels, including Linden Hills, Mama Day, and The Men of Brewster Place, Naylor depicted of many social issues, including poverty, racism, homophobia, discrimination against women, and the social stratification of African Americans.

Vashti Crutcher Lewis, a contributor to the Dictionary of Literary Biography, commented on the "brilliance" of Naylor's first novel, derived from "her rich prose, her lyrical portrayals of African Americans, and her illumination of the meaning of being a black woman in America".

In The Women of Brewster Place and her other novels, Naylor focuses on "themes of deferred dreams of love (familial and sexual), marriage, respectability, and economic stability, while observing the recurring messages that poverty breeds violence, that true friendship and affection are not dependent on gender, and that women in the black ghettos of America bear their burdens with grace and courage," stated Lewis.

== Awards ==
- National Book Award for first novel, 1983
- National Endowment for the Arts Fellowship, 1985
- Candace Award, National Coalition of 100 Black Women, 1986
- Guggenheim Fellowship, 1988
- Lillian Smith Award, 1989.
