= Brooklyn Babylon =

2001 film by Marc Levin

- Film poster
- Directed by: Marc Levin
- Written by: Marc Levin
- Produced by: Henri M. Kessler
- Starring: Tariq Trotter; Sara Goberman; David Vadim
- Cinematography: Mark Benjamin
- Edited by: Emir Lewis
- Production companies: BAC Films; Canal+ Studio Canal
- Distributed by: Artisan Entertainment (United States); BAC Films (France)
- Release date: August 17, 2001 (United States)
- Running time: 89 minutes
- Countries: United States; France
- Language: English

Brooklyn Babylon is a 2001 film written and directed by Marc Levin, and a modern retelling of the Song of Solomon, set against the backdrop of the Crown Heights riot, starring Black Thought of The Roots.

== Plot summary ==
In Brooklyn's Crown Heights, where West Indian Rastafarians and other Blacks live next door to the Jewish Chabad community, ethnic tensions are high. After a minor car crash, the headstrong Judah and other Jewish men who patrol the neighborhood as vigilantes confront Scratch, a mouthy hustler. Passengers in the cars make eye contact: Sol, a hip-hop musician, songwriter, and artist (Scratch's friend), and Sara, who is betrothed to Judah but wants to go to college and be on her own. Over the next few days, while Scratch and Judah's conflict escalates in violence, Sara and Sol connect in ways that echo Sheba and Solomon.

== Production ==
Brooklyn Babylon was the second-made of Levin's late nineties hip-hop trilogy, which began with Slam, a searing prison drama starring Saul Williams, Sonja Sohn and Bonz Malone. The third installment was 2000's Whiteboyz, a black comedy about white farm kids in Iowa who want to be black rappers, and starred Danny Hoch, Dash Mihok, Mark Webber and Piper Perabo.

== Cast ==
- Tariq Trotter as Solomon, Member of The Lions
- Karen Starc as Sara (as Karen Goberman)
- Bonz Malone as Scratch
- David Vadim as Judah
- Carol Woods as Cislyn
- Slick Rick as Buddah
- Mad Cobra as Key Bouncer
- Mina Bern as Nanna
- Joanne Baron as Aunt Rose
- Olek Krupa as Uncle Vlad

Roots members Ahmir "Questlove" Thompson, James "Kamal" Gray, Leonard "Hub" Hubbard and Kyle "Scratch" Jones played other members of The Lions, and Roots beatbox artist Rahzel served as the film's narrator.

== Festivals ==
The film was entered in the Slamdance Film Festival, Valenciennes Film Festival, and Agen American Indie Film Festival. Marc Levin was nominated for the Grand Special Prize at the Deauville Film Festival.

== Reception ==
Brooklyn Babylon received mixed reviews by critics, earning a 50% "Fresh" rating on Rotten Tomatoes and a score of 26 on Metacritic.
