= Class Divide (film) =

2016 film by Marc Levin

- Directed by: Marc Levin
- Produced by: Daphne Pinkerson; Marc Levin
- Cinematography: Mark Benjamin; Sam Cullman; Daniel B. Levin; Bob Richman
- Edited by: Ema Ryan Yamazaki
- Music by: Marc Ribot
- Production companies: HBO; Blowback Productions
- Distributed by: HBO Max (international)
- Release date: 2015
- Running time: 71 minutes
- Country: United States
- Language: English

Class Divide is a 2015 documentary film by Marc Levin about gentrification. The film premiered at the 2015 DOC NYC.

== Description ==
The documentary shows the effects of gentrification in Chelsea subsequent to the creation of the High Line park on the population of the neighbourhood. Since the rehabilitation of the old railways of the High Line into an urban park, the real estate market in the neighbourhood increased sharply. The documentary illustrates the impact of the changes this incurs in the life of the residents with the establishment of the for-profit private school Avenues: The World School on 25th and 26th streets, just opposite 10th Avenue from the Chelsea-Elliott housing project which offers accommodation for low-income inhabitants. At the time, tuition at Avenues cost between $40,000 and $50,000 per year, while the average income in the housing project complexes was $21,000 per year with an unemployment rate of about 58%. Marc Levin follows families from the Avenues school and from Chelsea-Elliott Houses. Focusing on the children and young adults from both sides of 10th Avenue, the documentary shows the discrepancies in living situation, expectations and opportunities between them. It also shows their understanding of the situation and of each other.

== Reception ==
On the review aggregator website Rotten Tomatoes, the film holds an approval rating of 100%, based on 6 reviews, with an average rating of 8.8/10.
