= Chicagoland (TV series) =

2014 American TV documentary series

- Created by: Mark Benjamin; Marc Levin
- Narrated by: Mark Konkol
- Country of origin: United States
- Original language: English
- No. of seasons: 1
- No. of episodes: 8

Original release
- Network: CNN
- Release: March 6 – April 24, 2014

Chicagoland is a documentary series that debuted its pilot episode at the 2014 Sundance Film Festival on January 19, 2014. It was aired on CNN in eight successive weekly broadcasts beginning March 6, 2014, and ending April 24, 2014. It is executive produced by Robert Redford and Laura Michalchyshyn and created by Mark Benjamin and Marc Levin. During its production, the documentary received assistance from the office of Chicago mayor Rahm Emanuel.

== Background ==
Chicagoland is part of a CNN strategy, directed by network President Jeff Zucker, to make CNN's programming less dependent on the unpredictable ebbs and flows of the 24-hour news cycle. Zucker decided to introduce documentary series in its program line-up in order to attract viewers during periods when the news is insufficient to compel viewer attention.

The show was executively produced by Redford and created by filmmakers Benjamin and Levin, who had previously created the very similarly themed show Brick City, a documentary about Newark, New Jersey. Chicagoland is narrated by Mark Konkol. The filming took eight months in 2013. CNN described the show as: "The riveting, real-life drama of a city looking to unite at this critical moment in the city’s history."

== Production ==
The show was filmed by three camera crews that amassed over 1000 hours of footage. Three of the principal subjects of the crews were Mayor Rahm Emanuel, South Side high school principal Elizabeth Dozier and Chicago Police Department superintendent Garry McCarthy. The Chicago Tribune gained access to over 700 e-mails between Emanuel, Benjamin, Levin, and CNN. In response to the Chicago Tribune report, CNN asserted that the Mayor's office had neither editorial control nor editorial approval over either the show's content or its associated promotional material, and one of the Chicago Tribune reporters said the emails show the normal scheduling and schmoozing involved in working with subjects. The Huffington Post blogger Spencer Green mocked the whole ordeal saying that a sequel was forthcoming entitled Rahm Emanuel: A Towering God Among Men. Months before the show ever aired, Levin and Benjamin, who were clients of The William Morris Endeavor (WME) agency requested that WME not represent them in this production to avoid a conflict of interest because WME's co-CEO is Ari Emanuel, brother of Rahm.

== Episodes ==
No.	Title	Directed by	Written by	Original release date	Prod. code
1	"The New Boss"	Unknown	Unknown	March 6, 2014	TBA
The struggle between Chicago Teachers Union President Karen Lewis and the administration of Mayor Rahm Emanuel is introduced along with the improvements of Fenger High School on the city's South Side, and cameras followed the principal. Gang life in certain sections of the city is illustrated by Police Superintendent Garry McCarthy. His outsider approach is aggressive as he states "I want to save the world ..."
2	"The Champs"	Unknown	Unknown	March 13, 2014	TBA
The city of Chicago is captivated by the historic playoff run and victory of the NHL Stanley Cup champion Chicago Blackhawks. As the plans for some school closures move ahead, Mayor Rahm Emanuel is criticized for using city funds to develop a new basketball arena for DePaul University and revamp Navy Pier, the most visited leisure attraction in the entire Midwestern United States. As the seniors at Fenger High School get ready for prom, Principal Liz Dozier questions the school's plans to organize a peace march after a nearby shooting occurred. Meanwhile, one of Police Superintendent Garry McCarthy’s top commanders, Police Chief Leo Schmitz, works to help serve and protect the community of Englewood from gang activity.
3	"Fireworks"	Unknown	Unknown	March 20, 2014	TBA
As the 4th of July approaches, Mayor Emanuel presides over the naturalization of new American citizens and reflects on his own heritage as the son of immigrants. At the Albany Park Theater Project, Lilia Escobar and JP Marquez perform in "Homeland," a play about their immigrant experiences – taking their work to the big stage at the iconic Goodman Theater. Fenger High School Principal Liz Dozier takes one of her culinary graduates to meet award-winning chef Grant Achatz at his renowned Chicago restaurant, Alinea, where the culinary graduate gets a life-changing opportunity. Trauma surgeon Dr. Andrew Dennis struggles to save a young gunshot victim – only to discover his real story.
4	"Second Chances"	Unknown	Unknown	March 27, 2014	TBA
Common, Dwyane Wade and Magic Johnson assist Mayor Rahm Emanuel with promoting Chicago's youth programs. Also: The mayor mentors a promising young man; a youth rapper makes his Lollapalooza debut; and a Fenger high-school student is released from prison.
5	"Safe Passage"	Unknown	Unknown	April 3, 2014	TBA
A new school year brings with it the implementation of Mayor Emanuel's Safe Passage program. Also: A crisis occurs on the first day of school at Fenger High; and venture capitalists host a Demo Day for young tech stars.
6	"Broken Wings"	Unknown	Unknown	April 10, 2014	TBA
Mayor Emanuel launches a series of new public-works projects; former mayor Richard Daley reflects on his time in office; community leaders work to improve their neighborhoods; a community activist fights violence; a potential gang war threatens the safety of Fenger High students; a young patient gets a second chance at Cook County Trauma and Burn Unit.
7	"Back of the Yards"	Unknown	Unknown	April 17, 2014	TBA
A shooting rocks the community all while Fenger High prepares for homecoming; Mayor Emanuel campaigns for stricter gun laws.
8	"City of the Future"	Unknown	Unknown	April 24, 2014	TBA
Mayor Rahm Emanuel delivers his annual budget address, in which he shares his vision for Chicago's future. Meanwhile, Chicago Ideas Week features appearances from chef Mario Batali and artist Hebru Brantley; the mayor deals with the pension crisis; the Chicago Police Department addresses safety regarding the Chicago Marathon; educational programs for young children are expanded; First Lady Michelle Obama, who hails from Chicago, speaks with a young college-bound student; and Fenger High holds a fund-raiser.

== Reception ==
Alessandra Stanley of The New York Times says the show is a "commendable" effort with "compelling characters" and described its subject matter and cinematic depiction favorably. Allison Keene of The Hollywood Reporter said noted both positive and negative elements of the show, but generally approved of its overall presentation. Keene also noted, however, that subsequent episodes did not quite live up to the premiere. Los Angeles Times critic Robert Lloyd stated Mayor Emanuel's energy is entertaining and he is quite charming before the right audience, and that high school principal Dozier is compelling and full of life. Brian Lowry of Variety questioned the worth of the show as a constructive use of time for viewers. According to Crain's ChicagoBusiness, the show is "often disturbing" yet "hope-inspiring". The Wrap's Tim Molloy said that Chicagoland was good, but did not compare to Brick City. Among the few reviews that were published after or near the end of the series was a negative one by Rick Kogan of the Chicago Tribune. Kogan considered the whole series a bit "contrived". During the 8-week span the viewership dropped off precipitously losing 48% of its viewers.
