= Mr. Freeze (disambiguation) =

Mr. Freeze is a comic book character appearing in DC Comics.

Mr. Freeze may also refer to:

- Mr. Freeze (Gotham character), the version of the character appearing in TV series Gotham
- "Mr. Freeze" (Gotham episode), TV series episode
- Mr. Freeze (roller coaster), also known as Mr. Freeze: Reverse Blast
- Mr. Freeze, a brand of freezie sold primarily in Canada
- "Mr. Freeze", a song by Dr. Know
