= Bönz Malone =

American writer and actor

- Born: The Bronx New York, US
- Occupations: Writer; Actor; Music Executive; Journalist
- Known for: His work in VIBE & SOURCE; Signing Mobb Deep to record deal
- Musical career
- Genres: hip hop; East Coast hip hop; hardcore hip hop; gangsta rap
- Label: Island Records
- Writing career
- Years active: 1986–present
- Genres: non-fiction, hiphop culture, music history, pop culture, rap history
- Notable work: Hip Hop Immortals (2002); ISBN 0972074619 ISBN 9780972074612

Bönz Malone is an American writer and actor.

== Career ==
=== Writing ===
Malone began his writing career at Youth Communication in 1986, where he was a teen writer and reporter for New Youth Connections (later renamed YCteen), a magazine written by and for New York City public high-school students. At Youth Communication, Malone developed and perfected his hip hop writing style in a monthly column called Streetalk, which ran from 1987 to 1989. Malone later took the Streetalk column and style to Spin magazine, Vibe magazine, and other venues for which he became a notable contributor.

In 1995, he wrote the Notorious B.I.G. cover story for July issue of The Source magazine titled, "King of New York", which became the magazine's highest-selling issue. In the same month of that year his feature article, Deep Space Nine was published in Vibe magazine, being the first article to introduce all nine members of the Wu-Tang Clan.

Malone is the author of the coffee table book Hip Hop Immortals, for which he profiled 85 hip hop artists and features the photography of David LaChapelle, Mark Seliger, Jesse Frohman, Christian Witkin, and Michel Comte among others.

=== Film ===
While Malone was at Youth Communication he was featured in What's Going On, the Marc Levin television documentary about graffiti and street life. It was the first of several Levin films in which he appeared. Malone starred in Levin's 1998 prison film Slam, which won the Camera d'Or at the Cannes Film Festival and the Grand Jury Prize for dramatic film at Sundance. He then appeared in Levin's 1999 Whiteboyz starring Dash Mihok, Mark Webber and Danny Hoch among a number of hip hop star cameos, and Levin's 2001 Brooklyn Babylon -- a Romeo and Juliet story set amid the Caribbean African - Hasidic Jewish clash of the Crown Heights riot starring Black Thought and the rest of The Roots.

Malone played supporting roles in Life, the 2000 John Singleton Shaft, Adam Bhala Lough's 2002 Bomb the System again with Marc Webber, and starred in the 2004 Men Without Jobs, and The Jerky Boys' Kamal Ahmed's 2003 God Has a Rap Sheet.

Malone was the script consultant for the 1992 film, Juice directed by Ernest Dickerson and starring Tupac Shakur and Omar Epps.

=== Music ===
Malone was an A&R executive in 1992 at Island Records, where he signed Mobb Deep to their first record deal. He also missed the chance to sign the Notorious B.I.G. when he won a dice game.
