= Alan Levin (filmmaker) =

American filmmaker (1926–2006)

Alan Levin (February 28, 1926 – February 13, 2006) was an American filmmaker and journalist best known for making documentaries on PBS and HBO. Three of his documentaries won Emmy Awards.

== Early life and career ==
Levin was born Alan Levinstein in Brooklyn, New York. He served during World War II and graduated from Wesleyan University in Connecticut in 1946. His career started as a journalist working for Associated Press and the New York Post. He worked for Senator Harrison Williams in 1963–64 before becoming a producer on WABC-TV between 1965 and 1967.

His father, Herman, assisted Rabbi Mordecai Kaplan with his founding of the Jewish Reconstructionist movement in the 1930s. His grandfather, Isaac Levinstein, owned several movie theaters in New York in the early 1900s.

== Documentary career ==
Levin's documentary career started with the Public Broadcast Laboratory, then continued with WNET, a Public Broadcasting Service (PBS) primary member station. Defense and Domestic Needs: Contest for Tomorrow, which aired on Public Broadcast Laboratory, won a Alfred I. duPont–Columbia University Award. He again attracted attention with The New Immigrants in 1979 which explored the immigration of non-European migrants to the US and earned him his first Emmy, a New York Emmy.

His 1982 film Portrait of an American Zealot was one of the first films of the growing popularity of the so-called religious right. That film marked the end of his employment for PBS although he would continue to make films for the network. In 1986, he made Inside the Jury Room featuring the first jury deliberation to be filmed which was shown on PBS Frontline

He partnered with Bill Moyers to film a number of documentaries. The Secret Government: The Constitution in Crisis looked at the activities of the CIA leading up to the Iran–Contra affair. It earned Levin his second Emmy, a News and Documentary Emmy.

Levin would later make documentaries for HBO. With his son, Marc Levin, and his production partner Daphne Pinkerson, he made Thug Life in D.C. about the lives of four prisoners in Washington.

He died at his home in Maplewood, New Jersey, on February 13, 2006.
