= The After Party: The Last Party 3 =

- Directed by: Michael Schiller
- Written by: Michael Schiller; Jon Fine; Steve Marcus
- Produced by: Donovan Leitch; Caty Borum; Bret Burgess; Susan Chainey; Jon Fine; Zachary David Medow; Michael Schiller
- Starring: André Benjamin; Mark Benjamin; Barbara Bush; Jenna Bush; Hillary Clinton; Don King; Donovan Leitch; Marc Levin; Linda Sarsour; Al Sharpton; Cornel West
- Cinematography: Mark Benjamin; Jeremiah Crowell; Tevo Diaz; Jon Fine; Michael Schiller
- Edited by: Eric Bruggemann; Diana DeCilio; Michael Schiller
- Release date: April 2011 (New York Los Angeles)
- Running time: 64 minutes
- Country: United States
- Language: English

The After Party: The Last Party 3 is a 2011 American documentary feature film about a cinematographer (Michael Schiller) who is caught in a mass arrest while filming 2004 Republican National Convention protest activity near ground zero at the World Trade Center.

The film is the third in a series of documentaries, The Last Party and The Party's Over.

== Reception ==
The After Party: The Last Party 3 has won several awards and has screened across the United States. It has also received favorable reviews.

== Accolades ==
Competition	Award	Category
New York Los Angeles International Film Festival	Winner	Best Documentary Feature
Duke City DocFest	Winner	Freedom of Speech Award
Los Angeles Cinema Festival of Hollywood	Winner	Best Documentary Feature
ThrillSpy International Film Festival	Winner	Best Documentary

Official Selection	Screening Date	Venue
Manhattan Film Festival	July 24, 2011	The Producers Club
Global Peace Film Festival	Sept. 23, 24, 2011	Rollins College, Plaza Cinema Café
Atlanta DocuFest	Sept. 25, 2011	The Goat Farm
Duke City DocFest	Oct. 15, 2011	Kimo Theater
SF Documentary Film Festival	Oct. 15, 17, 19, 2011	Roxie Cinema, Shattuck Cinema, Roxie Cinema
Film Columbia Festival	Oct. 22, 2011	Morris Memorial
Red Rock Film Festival	Nov. 12, 2011	St. George Arts Center
