= The Last Party (film) =

- Theatrical release poster
- Directed by: Mark Benjamin; Marc Levin
- Written by: Robert Downey Jr.; Donovan Leitch; Marc Levin; Josh Richman
- Produced by: Eric Cahan; Donovan Leitch; Josh Richman
- Starring: Robert Downey Jr.
- Cinematography: Mark Benjamin; Mark Zero
- Edited by: Wendey Stanzler
- Distributed by: LIVE Entertainment; Triton Pictures
- Release date: August 27, 1993
- Running time: 96 minutes
- Country: United States
- Language: English

The Last Party is a 1993 documentary film co-written by and starring Robert Downey Jr.

== Premise ==
Interviews and commentary cover moments of history during the 1992 presidential campaigns and investigate the issues of the day with Downey's particular brand of off-beat humor and satire. Although Downey's political sympathies are clear in the film, he lampoons both Democrats and Republicans equally, and provides elements of general social commentary, as well. The film also provides a snap-shot of Robert Downey Jr., at a point in his life where he was falling into drug addiction that later led to an interruption in his career.

== Appearances ==
There are appearances of George H. W. Bush, Barbara Bush, Pat Buchanan, Bill Clinton, Patti Davis, Spike Lee, Jerry Brown, Roger Clinton, Oliver Stone, Al Sharpton, Dave Mustaine, G. Gordon Liddy, Marc Levin, Sean Penn, John Kerry, Peter Jennings, Jerry Falwell, Oliver North, Chelsea Clinton, Hillary Clinton, Mario Cuomo, John Dean, John Ehrlichman, Betty Friedan, Al Gore, Tipper Gore, H. R. Haldeman, Tom Hayden, Jesse Jackson, Ted Kennedy, Ross Perot, Dan Quayle, Dan Rather, Ronald Reagan, Ann Richards, Arnold Schwarzenegger, and Christian Slater.

== Reception ==
Variety called it "a pretentious vanity piece as much as a political tract" noting that it "could have been an intriguing behind-the-scenes look at the Democratic and Republican conventions but gets sidetracked by focusing on Downey and how everything affects him". The New York Times wrote: "Far too much of the time, the film dashes around trying to cover as many political bases as possible [...] but the visits are so brief that the issues are barely addressed" and that the closest the film comes to a conclusion is comparing America to a dysfunctional family.

Beginning in the 2010s, a clip from the film where Downey criticizes Wall Street and the New York Mercantile Exchange (NYMEX) went viral. Referring to the 4 World Trade Center, the site of the NYMEX trade show, Downey says "If money is evil then that building is hell".

== Sequels ==
Two sequel films were made, The Party's Over and The After Party: The Last Party 3.
