= Brick City (TV series) =

American television series

- Composer: Khari Mateen
- Country of origin: United States
- Original language: English
- No. of seasons: 2
- No. of episodes: 11

Production
- Executive producers: Sarah Barnett, Mark Benjamin, Marc Levin, Evan Shapiro, Forest Whitaker, Michael Klein, Mala Chapple
- Producers: Jenner Furst, Keith McQuirter
- Cinematography: Daniel B. Levin, James Adolphus
- Editors: Jenner Furst, Daniel Praid, Vanessa Procopio

Original release
- Network: Sundance Channel
- Release: September 21, 2009 – March 13, 2011

Brick City is an American television documentary series on the Sundance Channel, created and directed by filmmakers Mark Benjamin and Marc Levin. The series captures the daily drama of a community striving to improve. Against great odds, Newark's citizens and its mayor, Cory Booker, fight to raise the city out of nearly a half century of violence, poverty and corruption.

It won a Peabody Award in 2009 "for its honest and passionate exposition of the lives and institutions that make up a community, and for its inspiring yet sometimes skeptical look at the trials embedded within the struggle for a better future."

== Series ==
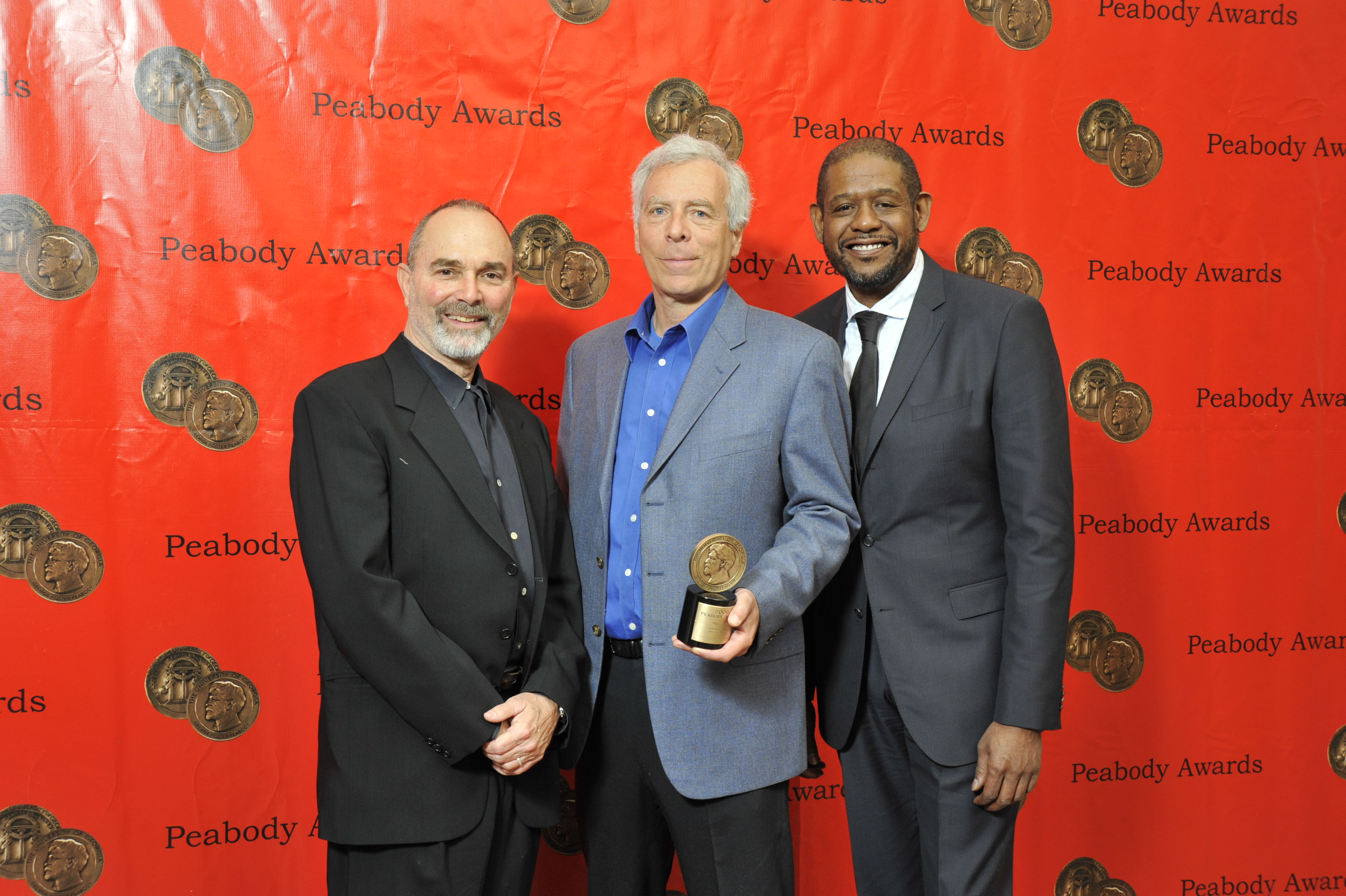
Mark Benjamin, Marc Levin and Forest Whitaker at the 69th Annual Peabody Awards for Brick City

Brick City premiered on September 21, 2009. The series is produced and directed by award-winning filmmakers Marc Levin (Slam, Schmatta: Rags to Riches to Rags, Gang War: Bangin' in Little Rock) and Mark Benjamin (The Last Party, Jails Hospitals and Hip-Hop), who also created the series. Academy Award-winning actor and filmmaker Forest Whitaker executive produces. Executive producers for Sundance Channel are Evan Shapiro, Sarah Barnett, Mala Chapple and Michael Klein. The production team went on to create Chicagoland, which is a successor to the show.

== Spin-off documentary ==
During Cory Booker's 2020 presidential campaign, directors Mark Benjamin and Marc Levin released the feature documentary Cory in Brick City, which premiered at the DTLA Film Festival on October 26, 2019, followed by its New York premiere at DOC NYC on November 9, 2019. The film draws from footage originally captured for the Brick City series to offer a focused portrait of then-Mayor Booker as he attempts to transform Newark, once called “America’s most livable city” and, by 2008, deemed one of the most crime-ridden.

== See also ==
- Newark, New Jersey
- Cory Booker
- Garry McCarthy
- Street Fight
- 2014 Newark mayoral election
