= Worse Than a Crime =

- Gotham episode
- Episode no.: Season 2 Episode 11
- Directed by: Jeffrey Hunt
- Written by: Bruno Heller
- Production code: 4X6211
- Original air date: November 30, 2015

Guest appearances
- Natalie Alyn Lind as Silver St. Cloud; Tonya Pinkins as Ethel Peabody; Ron Rifkin as Father Creel

Episode chronology
← Previous "The Son of Gotham"	Next → "Mr. Freeze"
- Gotham season 2

"Worse Than a Crime" is the eleventh episode of the second season, 33rd episode overall and the mid-season finale from the FOX series Gotham. This episode is also the last episode to use the subtitle "Rise of the Villains". The episode was written by series developer Bruno Heller and directed by Jeffrey Hunt. It was first broadcast in November 30, 2015 in FOX. In the episode, Gordon has his final showdown against Galavan, who has kidnapped Bruce to end the legacy of his family.

The episode was watched by 4.51 million viewers, the highest ratings of the season since the second episode and received generally positive reviews. Critics commented on Gordon's morality change but criticized the episode's subplots and pace.

== Plot ==
Alfred (Sean Pertwee) finds himself in a junkyard, hiding from Tabitha (Jessica Lucas) and her crew. Lucius Fox (Chris Chalk), having fixed Thomas Wayne's computer, arrives at Wayne Manor but Bruce (David Mazouz) is nowhere to be found. Bruce is brought to Theo Galavan's (James Frain) penthouse where Theo and Father Creel tell him about the final sacrifice: Bruce himself.

Gordon (Ben McKenzie) wakes up in Nygma's (Cory Michael Smith) apartment where Cobblepot (Robin Lord Taylor) tells him he's now a fugitive for assaulting Theo in the courtroom and has "Wanted" posters with his face on them. Lee (Morena Baccarin) is shocked by Barnes (Michael Chiklis) ordering Gordon's arrest. Barnes questions Leslie about Gordon's whereabouts but she says she doesn't know anything. Nygma overhears and tells Leslie his location. She arrives just when Gordon, Cobblepot, and his henchmen are planning on killing Theo. Gordon tries to convince Leslie to leave Gotham City, but she reveals instead that she's pregnant.

Silver, not wanting to witness Bruce's death, makes an excuse to Theo stating she's feeling unwell. Theo thinks Silver is weak and tells her to make Bruce fall in love with her again to prove she is worthy of the Dumas' name or else be thrown out of the family. Silver visits Bruce in his cell, apologizing and blaming Theo for everything, but Bruce doesn't listen. Even though he hates her, they talk about their lives and experiences. Silver has a change of mind and tries to help Bruce escape, but their attempts are thwarted by Theo, and they're both jailed.

Alfred tries to hitchhike, but he's arrested for trying to take a man's car. While talking with Barnes and Bullock (Donal Logue), Fox tries to tell them Theo is behind Bruce's disappearance, but Barnes points out that Alfred broke into Theo's penthouse, so that it could be claimed that Tabitha was just defending her home without further proof. Nygma reveals Gordon's location to Fox, Alfred, and Bullock.

Just when Gordon and Leslie are saying goodbye to Penguin, and getting ready to leave Gotham, Alfred, Bullock, and Fox appear and convince him to help them find Bruce. They, alongside Cobblepot and Selina (Camren Bicondova), head to Bruce's location. Bruce, knowing about Silver's motivations for trying to get him to love her, kisses her in front of Theo and forgives her. Bruce is then tied to a stake, where Father Creel prepares to kill him. Gordon and Cobblepot arrive with their henchmen and they engage in a fight with the Order. When Father Creel tries to attack Gordon, Bullock kills him. Selina and Alfred release Bruce.

Theo and Tabitha try to escape using parachutes. Before they go, Theo expresses his disappointment in Silver and appears as though he might kill her, but instead is knocked unconscious by Tabitha, saying she is tired of Theo's bullying. The women escape using the parachutes but leave Theo in the penthouse. Gordon arrives and arrests Theo. Barnes arrives and arrests both Theo and Gordon. Cobblepot arrives and knocks out Barnes. He convinces Gordon that Theo won't ever be convicted for his crimes and needs to be killed. They go to the docks where Cobblepot slowly beats Theo to death with a baseball bat before Gordon puts him out of his misery and shoots him dead. The next day, Gordon meets with Leslie in a park and he proposes to her. Theo's corpse is brought to Indian Hill where scientists state his body will be experimented on by Hugo Strange. In the background, Fish Mooney's corpse is seen.

In the final scene, a man flees from someone and hides behind a dumpster. The follower finds him, revealed to be Mr. Freeze and freezes the man with his cold gun.

== Reception ==
=== Ratings ===
The episode was watched by 4.51 million viewers with a 1.6/5 share among adults aged 18 to 49. This was an increase in viewership from the previous episode, which was watched by 4.00 million viewers. This made Gotham the most watched program of the day in FOX, beating Minority Report, and also the 29th most watched of the week in the 18-49 demographics.

With Live+7 DVR viewing factored in, the episode had an overall rating of 6.93 million viewers, and a 2.6 in the 18–49 demographic.

=== Critical reviews ===
Professional ratings
Review scores
Source	Rating
Rotten Tomatoes (Tomatometer)	71%
Rotten Tomatoes (Average Score)	7.0
IGN	7.5
The A.V. Club	C+
Paste Magazine	8.0
TV Fanatic	4.8/5 stars
The Young Folks	8/10
JoBlo	9/10
Pop Matters	4/10 stars
New York Magazine	2/5 stars

"Rise of the Villains: Worse Than a Crime" received positive reviews from critics. The episode received a rating of 71% with an average score of 7.0 out of 10 on the review aggregator Rotten Tomatoes, with the site's consensus stating: "'Worse Than a Crime' is an effective, action-packed mid-season finale that ties up loose ends and makes room for neglected characters while leaving the future wide open."

Matt Fowler of IGN gave the episode a "good" 7.5 out of 10 and wrote in his verdict, "'Worse Than a Crime' may have wobbled a bit when it came to the monks and the blood sacrifice and how Theo actually got apprehended, but Gordon's final decision to coldly put a bullet in Theo (after Penguin had mangled him with a bat) was a nice, dark move. And one that I hope is expanded upon."

The A.V. Club's Kyle Fowle gave the episode a "C+" grade and wrote, "Gotham's fall finale, 'Rise Of The Villains: Worse Than A Crime,' wants to be the BIG episode that sees Jim Gordon finally cross that line. It wants to feel important; the whole structure of the episode gives away the motive, which is to build to a shocking climax that, ideally, pays off a half-season's worth of character development, of Jim slowly slipping away from the morals that once defined him and becoming something else. That's a potentially compelling character arc, but Gotham fails to follow through with it for a number of reasons.
