= The Party's Over (2001 film) =

2001 film by Rebecca Chalkin, and Donovan Leitch

- DVD cover
- Directed by: Rebecca Chalkin; Donovan Leitch
- Produced by: Rebecca Chalkin; Donovan Leitch; Stanley Buchthal
- Narrated by: Philip Seymour Hoffman
- Cinematography: Kevin Ford; Luke Geissbuhler; Carter Smith; Ben Weinstein
- Edited by: Sabine Hoffman
- Music by: Sabina Sciubba
- Distributed by: Film Movement
- Release date: November 2, 2001 (New York City)
- Running time: 137 minutes
- Country: United States
- Language: English

The Party's Over (theatrically released as Last Party 2000) is a 2001 American documentary film about American democracy and politics.

The film is the first sequel to the documentary The Last Party. A third documentary was made in the series, The After Party: The Last Party 3.

== Synopsis ==
This documentary follows Philip Seymour Hoffman as a concerned citizen on an uncensored journey of the state of American democracy. The film examines how the American political process addresses, and often fails to address, the country's most pressing issues. The film answers the question, is there a difference between Republicans and Democrats?

== Cast ==
- Philip Seymour Hoffman—Narrator/Interviewer
- Tim Robbins—Himself
- Susan Sarandon—Herself
- Jesse Jackson—Himself
- Rudy Giuliani—Himself
- Michael Moore—Himself
- Bill Maher—Himself
- Ben Harper—Himself
- Noam Chomsky—Himself
- Rosie O'Donnell—Herself
- Melissa Etheridge—Herself
- Mark Fritz—Himself
- Courtney Love—Herself
- Pat Robertson—Himself
- Ralph Nader—Himself
- Newt Gingrich—Himself
- Barenaked Ladies—Themselves
- Willie Nelson—Himself
- Arlo Guthrie—Himself
- Bonnie Raitt—Herself
- Rage Against the Machine—Themselves
- Stone Temple Pilots—Themselves
- Steve Earle—Himself
- John Kerry—Himself
- Eddie Vedder—Himself
- William Baldwin—Himself
- Robert Downey Jr.—Himself
- Charlton Heston—Himself
