= Slam (1998 film) =

1998 film directed by Marc Levin

- Directed by: Marc Levin
- Screenplay by: Marc Levin; Bonz Malone; Sonja Sohn; Richard Stratton; Saul Williams
- Story by: Marc Levin; Richard Stratton
- Produced by: Henri M. Kessler; Marc Levin; Richard Stratton
- Starring: Saul Williams; Sonja Sohn; Marc Levin; Bonz Malone; Beau Sia
- Cinematography: Mark Benjamin
- Edited by: Emir Lewis
- Music by: DJ Spooky
- Production companies: Blowback Productions; Off Line Entertainment Group
- Distributed by: Trimark Pictures
- Release dates: January 20, 1998 (Sundance); October 7, 1998 (United States)
- Running time: 100 minutes
- Country: United States
- Language: English
- Box office: $1 million

Slam is a 1998 American independent drama film directed, co-written and co-produced by Marc Levin and starring and co-written by Saul Williams and Sonja Sohn. It tells the story of a young African-American man whose talent for poetry is hampered by his social background.

== Plot ==
Raymond "Ray" Joshua (played by Saul Williams) is a young man growing up in the Southeast, Washington, D.C. neighborhood of Dodge City, slang for a real Southeast D.C. neighborhood. Despite his innate gift for poetry and his aspiration to be a rapper, he finds it difficult to escape the pressures of his surroundings: violence and drug dealing. While participating in a drug deal gone wrong, Ray's close friend Big Mike is shot.

Ray is caught by the police and sent to the District of Columbia Department of Corrections' central detention facility. He is arraigned for possession of a controlled substance at the H. Carl Moultrie Courthouse and bail is set at $10,000. When his public defender explains his options ("cop out" and plead guilty), "rock" (stand trial), or "cooperate" (serve as an informant), Ray despairs, particularly as he is being pressured to participate in a drug culture "inside" very similar to what he was a part of "outside".

Ray takes no sides, unwilling to believe that his options are limited to the choices he is being presented with. When threatened with violence in the prison yard, he retaliates with words, speaking the truths that he's witnessed in the form of a poetic rap meant to show the other inmates how their power and energy is being diverted into petty struggles with each other, rather than being directed toward the system that is keeping them down. In prison, he participates in the writing class of teacher Lauren Bell (Sonja Sohn), whom he comes to respect and admire. She advises him to pay more attention to his talents.

When Ray is unexpectedly released on bail for a few days prior to his court date by an incarcerated drug dealer whom Ray had inspired with his revolutionary ideas, he is able to convince his friends and their Dodge City crew not to retaliate with more violence for the shooting — to break the cycle instead. He explains that the "projects" where they all live and die are a government experiment and that continuing to kill each other is exactly what those who set up the experiment want them to be doing.

On the outside, he also reunites with Bell, and is welcomed into her circle of friends at a poetry reading at her home. They wind up spending the night together, despite her reservations about the future. The next day, she urges him to settle his legal troubles by agreeing to serve a year or two of prison time, rather than fighting the charges and potentially being put away for much longer.

They quarrel, because Ray feels that Bell doesn't understand his situation. He leaves, but shows up that night at a poetry slam event in D.C.'s Cleveland Park neighborhood that Bell had invited him to, just in time to see her perform an extremely powerful and empathetic piece that was clearly written for him. When the crowd demands an encore, she invites Ray onto the stage to perform instead, and he delivers an impromptu dramatic poem — scrawled as he crossed the city on public transit on his way to the slam — an emotional piece about black males and the criminal justice system. When the crowd demands an encore, Ray tells Lauren he needs to get some air, then leaves again. He wanders the streets until he is drawn to the Washington Monument.

== Cast ==
- Saul Williams as Ray Joshua
- Sonja Sohn as Lauren Bell
- Bonz Malone as Hopha
- Lawrence Wilson as Big Mike
- Beau Sia as Jimmy Huang
- Andre Taylor as China
- Rhozier Brown as the public defender
- Momolu Stewart as Bay, the jail rapper

Former D.C. Mayor Marion Barry makes a cameo appearance as the judge at Joshua's arraignment.

== Reception ==
The film received mixed to positive reviews from critics. The film holds a 61% approval rating on Rotten Tomatoes, based on reviews from 23 critics with an average rating of 6.8/10.

== Accolades ==
It won the Grand Jury Prize for a Dramatic Film at the 1998 Sundance Film Festival as well as the Caméra d'Or at the 1998 Cannes Film Festival.

Sohn and Williams won breakthrough acting awards for their starring rolls in the film as Bell and Joshua respectively at the 1998 Gotham Independent Film Awards.

== Soundtrack ==
A soundtrack containing hip hop music was released on October 13, 1998 by Epic Records. It was produced by Paul D. Miller aka DJ Spooky. It peaked at 84 on the Billboard 200 and 24 on the Top R&B/Hip-Hop Albums.

== Preservation ==
Slam was preserved and restored by the UCLA Film & Television Archive and the Academy Film Archive in conjunction with Sundance Institute from a 35mm interpositive, a 35mm magnetic track, DA-88s and an MO Disk. Restoration funding was provided by the Academy of Motion Picture Arts and Sciences, Sundance Institute, and the UCLA Film & Television Archive. The restoration had its Los Angeles premiere at the 2024 UCLA Festival of Preservation.

== See also ==
- List of hood films

== Footnotes ==
1. In one of the opening scenes, the streetsigns for the intersection of Hartford Street, SE and 23rd Place, SE are visible, placing the setting in the real neighborhood of Knox Hill, Washington, D.C.

Awards
Preceded by Sunday	Sundance Grand Jury Prize: U.S. Dramatic; 1998	Succeeded by Three Seasons
