= The Son of Gotham =

- Gotham episode
- Episode no.: Season 2 Episode 10
- Directed by: Rob Bailey
- Written by: John Stephens
- Production code: 4X6210
- Original air date: November 23, 2015

Guest appearances
- Richard Kind as Mayor Aubrey James; Natalie Alyn Lind as Silver St. Cloud; Ellen Harvey as Judge; Tommy Flanagan as Tom "The Knife"; Ron Rifkin as Father Creel

Episode chronology
← Previous "A Bitter Pill to Swallow"	Next → "Worse Than a Crime"
- Gotham season 2

"The Son of Gotham" is the tenth episode of the second season and 32nd episode overall from the FOX series Gotham. The episode was written by John Stephens and directed by Rob Bailey. It was first broadcast on November 23, 2015, in FOX.

== Plot ==
After Officer Parks' funeral, Gordon (Ben McKenzie) visits Galavan (James Frain) in Blackgate Penitentiary and says he will see him in court the next day. He later tells Leslie (Morena Baccarin) he worries Galavan will get off, and maybe he made a mistake not killing Eduardo Flamingo and avoiding Parks' death. Meanwhile, the Order of Saint Dumas kills a thug in a ritual, saying it's part of "cleansing Gotham."

Gordon and Bullock (Donal Logue) arrive at a Chinese massage parlor where an attack perpetuated by the Order of Saint Dumas took place. Gordon is attacked by a member of the Order but before he can question him about Galavan, the member commits suicide by stepping in front of a truck. Gordon and Bullock get a tip and go to the sewers where they discover evidence of the rituals and the eight murders the Order has already committed. They're attacked by another member, but they overpower him and when he wakes up, they impersonate other members of the order, and he reveals "the son of Gotham will die and the city shall be cleansed". Leslie notices Kristen Kringle (Chelsea Spack)'s absence, so Nygma (Cory Michael Smith) is forced to lie to her by telling her that Kringle left Gotham with Dougherty.

During the trial, Mayor James changes his testimony and says Galavan didn't kidnap him and instead frames Cobblepot (Robin Lord Taylor). Without the mayor's testimony and with no further proof, Galavan is released. When Galavan tries to look friendly to Gordon and the public, Gordon punches him and is escorted away by police. The policemen turn out to be Galavan's henchmen and they taser Gordon. Gordon wakes up at the docks where Galavan tells him his family's history and that their surname used to be Dumas. Galavan releases Gordon and fights with him, with Galavan gaining the upper hand. He then leaves and orders his men to kill Gordon, but Gordon is saved by Cobblepot.

Selina (Camren Bicondova) tells Bruce (David Mazouz) that Silver shouldn't be trusted and that she has a plan. After Bruce receives a call from Silver, saying that her uncle told her who killed her parents, Bruce and Silver are kidnapped by a criminal, Tom "The Knife". They're brought to an abandoned warehouse in the outskirts of Gotham City, and Tom says he wants to know the Waynes' killer for his "employers". He wants to know everything Galavan knows and threatens to torture them unless they tell him. When Bruce is threatened, Silver reveals she doesn't know the name and was just faking everything to Bruce. Bruce is tortured and when Tom returns, Silver reveals her true colors. When Tom threatens her, Silver reveals the killer's name is "M. Malone". Bruce and Selina appear, Tom was paid by them and everything was a facade to get the name and expose Silver's lies. Selina found Bruce's file in her house and enough proof about Silver luring Bruce to sell Wayne Enterprises to Galavan. Silver reveals she just faked the name while being threatened, but Bruce has had enough. They leave Silver alone in the warehouse.

Alfred (Sean Pertwee), who didn't know about Bruce's plan, goes to the Galavan penthouse, looking for him. Tabitha (Jessica Lucas) denies everything and Alfred threatens her. Tabitha and Alfred then engage in a fight, and even though Tabitha gets the upper hand, Alfred overpowers her and knocks her unconscious, but gets wounded in the process. As he is leaving the building, Tabitha throws a knife in his back and he escapes in a dump-truck. Galavan breaks into Wayne Manor and while talking to Bruce, he takes out a blade, planning to kill him.

== Reception ==
=== Ratings ===
The episode was watched by 4.00 million viewers with a 1.4/4 share among adults aged 18 to 49. This was a decrease in viewership from the previous episode, which was watched by 4.35 million viewers. This made Gotham the most watched program of the day in FOX, beating Minority Report, and also the 27th most watched of the week in the 18-49 demographics.

With Live+7 DVR viewing factored in, the episode had an overall rating of 6.49 million viewers, and a 2.4 in the 18–49 demographic.

=== Critical reviews ===
Professional ratings
Review scores
Source	Rating
Rotten Tomatoes (Tomatometer)	83%
Rotten Tomatoes (Average Score)	7.1
IGN	7.6
The A.V. Club	B+
Paste Magazine	7.5
TV Fanatic	4/5 stars
The Young Folks	6/10
JoBlo	9/10

"Rise of the Villains: The Son of Gotham" received mostly positive reviews from critics. The episode received a rating of 83% with an average score of 7.1 out of 10 on the review aggregator Rotten Tomatoes, with the site's consensus stating: "'The Son of Gotham' successfully balances silliness and seriousness while ratcheting up the tension for the mid-season finale of Gotham."

Matt Fowler of IGN gave the episode a "good" 7.6 out of 10 and wrote in his verdict, "'The Son of Gotham' was equal parts silly and satisfying. Bruce conning Silver may have been the best thing he's done on the show so far while Penguin basically being the "Oscar" of the new Odd Couple roomie situation with Riddler was distractingly rad. The buildup to Galavan's plan (Maniax, Barbara kidnapping Jim, trying to get Bruce to sign, etc.) was always going to be better than these final moments of the plan - which seem to involve Gotham crumbling under the heel of a dozen monks who can't fight for s***. Hell, Galavan's a better ass-kicker than all of them. So we'll have to see how this all twists out next week."

The A.V. Club's Kyle Fowle gave the episode a "B+" grade and wrote, "Outside of that repetitious storyline though, 'Son Of Gotham' manages to chew through a ton of plot before its fall finale next week, and that's a good thing. As I mentioned above, Gotham has a tendency to slow its plot down to a crawl, extending tedious storylines across weeks worth of episodes. Considering that the show struggles to find a consistent tone and compelling plots, that's a huge problem. 'Son Of Gotham' shows that the pacing really is the biggest issue. Despite the lackluster characters and bad dialogue, a fast-paced Gotham is ultimately much more entertaining."
