= Mr. Freeze (Gotham episode) =

- Gotham episode
- Episode no.: Season 2 Episode 12
- Directed by: Nick Copus
- Written by: Ken Woodruff
- Production code: 4X6212
- Original air date: February 29, 2016

Guest appearances
- B. D. Wong as Dr. Hugo Strange; Tonya Pinkins as Ethel Peabody; Nathan Darrow as Victor Fries/Mr. Freeze; Kristen Hager as Nora Fries; John Pirkis as Nigel; Danny Hoch as Pharmacist

Episode chronology
← Previous "Worse Than a Crime"	Next → "A Dead Man Feels No Cold"
- Gotham season 2

"Mr. Freeze" is the twelfth episode of the second season, 34th episode overall and the mid-season premiere from the FOX series Gotham. This episode is also the first episode to use the subtitle "Wrath of the Villains". The episode was written by Ken Woodruff and directed by Nick Copus. It was first broadcast on February 29, 2016, in FOX. In the episode, having just killed Galavan, Gordon returns to the GCPD, who's currently investigating a killing spree of a man who freezes people. Meanwhile, Cobblepot pays the consequences of killing Galavan.

The episode was watched by 4.12 million viewers, and although it was lower than the previous episode, it received critical acclaim, with critics commenting on Mr. Freeze's and Dr. Strange's introduction as well as Nathan Darrow's emotional performance.

== Plot ==
Having killed Galavan (James Frain), Gordon (Ben McKenzie) attends a hearing presided over by Harvey Dent (Nicholas D'Agosto) and Captain Barnes (Michael Chiklis). Gordon denies involvement in Galavan's murder, claiming Cobblepot (Robin Lord Taylor) was the one who did it. They exonerate him of the charges and reinstate him to the GCPD. It's also revealed that Cobblepot's henchmen have abandoned him after the murder. Butch (Drew Powell) has now become the boss of organized crime in Gotham and receives a visit from Tabitha (Jessica Lucas), who suggests they work together, which culminates in a kiss, watched by Selina (Camren Bicondova). Meanwhile, in the streets, an officer catches a man hiding a corpse in his trunk. When she tries to arrest him, the man, Victor Fries (Nathan Darrow) freezes her with his gun.

Gordon returns to the GCPD where he and Bullock (Donal Logue) investigate the killing spree of Fries. While Nygma (Cory Michael Smith) performs a test on the cryogenics, he deduces the killer uses supercooled liquid helium. After Bullock leaves, Gordon questions Nygma about Cobblepot living in his apartment, and Nygma states he rescued an injured man, believed he had gone straight, and was fooled by Penguin. Barnes then arrives, having captured Cobblepot. During his testimony, both Cobblepot's and Gordon's recount matches so Barnes ends up convinced. Cobblepot is then sent to Arkham Asylum after claiming he is "insane".

Fries arrives at his apartment, where his wife, Nora (Kristen Hager) is suffering from illness. He works in his basement, which contains frozen people he is experimenting on, in an attempt to freeze Nora until a cure is found. He attempts a reanimation on a test subject, using heat. It initially works but then the corpse begins disintegrating. When Nora runs out of medicine, Victor goes to the pharmacy. The pharmacist (Danny Hoch) refuses to give him the medicine without a prescription. Victor later returns for the medicine with his suit and weapon and freezes the pharmacist and the security guard. The GCPD arrive but Victor escapes with the pharmacist's body.

The GCPD finds Nora Fries' prescription bottle in the pharmacy and they bust into the Fries house. By that time, Victor has escaped and Nora had found his basement laboratory, shocked by the experiments her husband had been performing. The police take her into custody as Victor watches in horror. She's then questioned about Victor's activities and is threatened with jail but she refuses to betray him. In Arkham, Cobblepot is taunted by the prisoners after claiming he's the "King of Gotham". He's then sent to therapy with head psychiatrist Dr. Hugo Strange (B. D. Wong), who details his plans to send Cobblepot through many "treatment" programs in Arkham. As he returns to his cell, Cobblepot discovers Strange's patient, Nigel (John Pirkis) has plucked out his own eyes after Strange's suggestive words: "See no evil, do no evil".

Victor, unwilling to let Nora go to prison, decides to turn himself in to the GCPD. As he waits, Nygma views the pharmacist's body in the morgue and then leaves for a moment. When he returns, the pharmacist is gone. The pharmacist then walks through the GCPD, alive. He then collapses to the floor as he recognizes Victor. Victor is surprised to see his latest experiment has worked and escapes, planning to continue helping Nora with a cure. In the final scene, Dr. Strange enters into a secret elevator in Arkham which takes him to the Indian Hill labs. An employee, Ethel Peabody (Tonya Pinkins), adds that Bridgit Pike is still alive and refusing to cooperate with them. She tells him about that Fries appears to have succeeded in his experiments, which surprises Strange. As she hands him a newspaper, the media has now given Fries a new name: Mr. Freeze.

== Reception ==
=== Viewers ===
The episode was watched by 4.12 million viewers with a 1.5/5 share among adults aged 18 to 49. This was a decrease in viewership from the previous episode, which was watched by 4.51 million viewers. With this ratings, Gotham was the most-watched program of the day in FOX, beating out Lucifer, and also the 24th most watched of the week in the 18-49 demographics.

With Live+7 DVR viewing factored in, the episode had an overall rating of 6.57 million viewers, and a 2.5 in the 18–49 demographic.

=== Critical reviews ===
Professional ratings
Review scores
Source	Rating
Rotten Tomatoes (Tomatometer)	100%
Rotten Tomatoes (Average Score)	7.5
IGN	7.3
The A.V. Club	B
TV Fanatic	4.6/5 stars

"Wrath of the Villains: Mr. Freeze" received critical acclaim from critics. The episode received a rating of 100% with an average score of 7.5 out of 10 on the review aggregator Rotten Tomatoes, with the site's consensus stating: "The debut of Mr. Freeze and Hugo Strange in "Rise of the Villains: Mr. Freeze" gives a needed jump start to the second half of Gotham's uneven season."

Matt Fowler of IGN gave the episode a "good" 7.3 out of 10 and wrote in his verdict, "'Mr. Freeze' gave us sort of a run-of-the-mill Victor Fries origin story. Basically, it was this week's cop case and will probably wind up being a two-parter. Like the fall's Firefly's arc. More interesting here was the first live-action appearance of Hugo Strange and his role as – possibly – the architect behind most everything sinister in Gotham dating back to the series premiere."

The A.V. Club's Kyle Fowle gave the episode a "B" grade and wrote, "Gotham sticks with the fairly typical Mr. Freeze backstory, painting Victor Fries as a somewhat sympathetic villain, a man who goes too far while trying to save his terminally ill wife. Gotham doesn't excuse his behavior so much as ground his deadly experiments in a certain amount of pathos. For the first time in awhile, Gotham actually takes the time to explore how a villain is created in the city of Gotham—you would think that a season branded in its early going as "Rise of the Villains" would have done so sooner—and it certainly pays off. Nathan Darrow takes some time off from pleasuring the Underwoods to turn in a solid performance as Victor Fries, the desperation of his situation coming across in Darrow's often vacant, pained look. He's a man at the end of his rope, and Gotham does a good job of showing how the city of Gotham can turn a man from desperate to dangerous in a hurry."
