= Whiteboyz =

1999 comedy film directed by Marc Levin

- Directed by: Marc Levin
- Written by: Garth Belcon; Danny Hoch; Marc Levin; Richard Stratton
- Produced by: Henri M. Kessler; Richard Stratton; Ezra Swerdlow
- Starring: Danny Hoch; Dash Mihok; Mark Webber; Piper Perabo; Snoop Dogg
- Cinematography: Mark Benjamin
- Edited by: Emir Lewis
- Music by: Che Pope Joe Lisanti; Ted Lowe
- Distributed by: Fox Searchlight Pictures; 20th Century Fox
- Release date: September 10, 1999
- Running time: 92 minutes
- Country: United States
- Language: English
- Box office: $38,738

Whiteboyz (sometimes styled Whiteboys) is a 1999 American comedy film. The independent, limited release feature was written by Danny Hoch, Garth Belcon, Henri M. Kessler, Richard Stratton, and Marc Levin, and directed by Levin. The film opened to 37 theatres on the week of September 11, 1999. It marked the film debut of actress Piper Perabo, in a minor role. Several well-known rappers made cameo appearances in the film.

== Plot ==
The plot concerns the coming of age and misadventures of three white youths from the small town of Holyoke, Iowa, who, having been seduced by the fast money and easy women of the gangsta rap lifestyle, yearn to be African American.

The trio of would-be hoodlums ventures to Cabrini–Green housing project in Chicago, Illinois, where they come into conflict with actual criminals as well as the police. In a climactic finale, the irrepressible leader of the white hoodlums is beaten up and they return to Iowa and decide to stay there.

== Cast ==
- Danny Hoch as Flip
- Dash Mihok as James
- Mark Webber as Trevor
- Piper Perabo as Sara
- Eugene Byrd as Khalid
- Bönz Malone as Darius
- Reno Wilson as Mace

Cameos

- Dr. Dre as Don Flip Crew #1
- Fat Joe as Don Flip Crew #2
- Big Pun as Don Flip Crew #3 (uncredited)
- Snoop Dogg as himself, credited as "inmate 24,601 as Snoop Dogg"
- Doug E. Fresh as Parking Lot Rapper #1
- Slick Rick as Parking Lot Rapper #2

== Reception ==
Despite having a gross box office of just $22,451 during its entire theatrical run, the film has been broadcast frequently on cable networks including VH1, MTV2, HBO, and the Fuse Network.

== Soundtrack ==
Whiteboys

Soundtrack album by Various artists
- Released: July 20, 1999
- Recorded: 1998–1999
- Genre: Hip hop
- Label: TVT
- Producers: DJ Hurricane, Canibus, Infinite Arkatechz, Daz Dillinger, DJ Paul, Juicy J, Mr. Lee, DJ E-Z Rock, Trick Daddy, Bucktown USA, Irv Gotti, 12 Gauge, Whoridas, Wildliffe Society, Freaky D, Mike Chav

Professional ratings
Review scores
Source	Rating
AllMusic	2.5/5 stars

The soundtrack to the film was released on July 20, 1999, through TVT Records and consisted entirely of hip hop music. It peaked at No. 145 on the Billboard 200 and No. 50 on the Top R&B/Hip-Hop Albums chart. The single "Come Get It" reached No. 73 on the Hot R&B/Hip-Hop Singles & Tracks chart.

=== Track listing ===
1. "Who Is a Thug"- 4:30 (Big Punisher and 6430)
2. "Come Get It"- 4:24 (DJ Hurricane, Lord Have Mercy, Rah Digga and Rampage)
3. "Hell Ya"- 4:31 (Soopafly, Tray Deee, Daz Dillinger and Kurupt)
4. "White Boyz"- 4:15 (Snoop Dogg and T-Bo)
5. "Respect Power"- 3:37 (Raekwon)
6. "Watch Who U Beef Wit"- 4:24 (Canibus)
7. "Paper Chasers"- 4:40 (Tommy Finger)
8. "Don't Come My Way"- 4:50 (Slick Rick, Common and Renee Neufville)
9. "Wanna Be's"- 4:49 (Three 6 Mafia)
10. "Perfect Murda"- 4:31 (Do or Die)
11. "Real Hustlers"- 5:12 (Gotta Boyz)
12. "Get Rowdy"- 4:43 (Whoridas)
13. "For the Thugs"- 4:12 (Trick Daddy)
14. "Intrigued"- 4:33 (Cocoa Brovaz and Buckshot)
15. "I Can Relate"- 3:59 (Black Child)
16. "What's Up Jack"- 4:21 (Wildliffe Society)
17. "Pimps VIP"- 2:59 (12 Gauge)

== See also ==
- List of hood films
