= Danny Hoch =

American actor

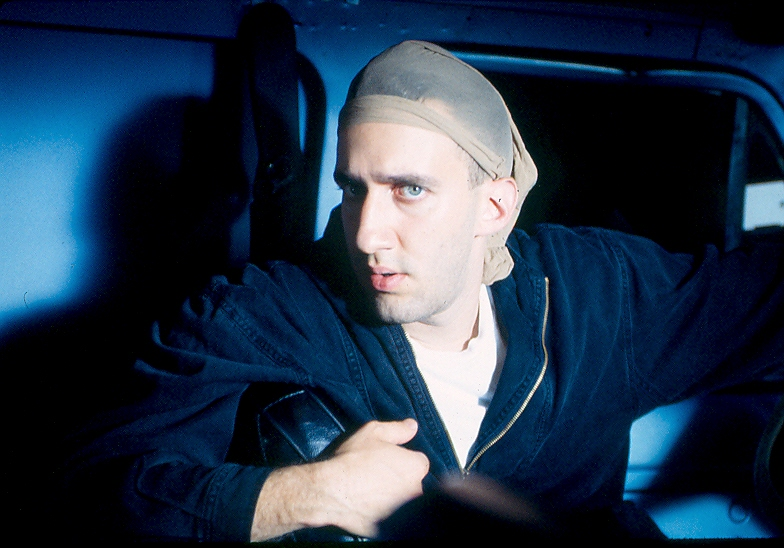
- Hoch on the set of His & Hers in 1998
- Born: November 23, 1970 (age 55); Brooklyn, New York, U.S.
- Occupations: Actor, writer, director, performance artist
- Years active: 1993–present

Daniel Hoch (born November 23, 1970) is an American actor, writer, director, and performance artist. He has acted in larger roles in independent and art house movies and had a few small roles in mainstream Hollywood films, with increasing exposure as in 2007's We Own the Night. He is also known for his one-man shows.

== Theatre ==
Two of his three one-man shows, Jails, Hospitals & Hip-Hop and Some People, were published together in 1998. In both pieces, he explores the multicultural (and multilingual) New York where he grew up, providing adept monologues in the languages of the people, Cuban Spanish, Dominican Spanish (Nuyorican), Jamaican Patois, or Trinidadian English.

Some People followed his first endeavor, Pot Melting, and was broadcast on HBO in the mid-1990s, which granted Hoch more national exposure, allowing him to tour more cities to greater crowds. Hoch founded the Hip-Hop Theater Festival in 2000. Together, his three plays have won many awards, including two Obie Awards, a Sundance Writers Fellowship, and the CalArts' Alpert Awards in the Arts in Theatre. In 2010, he won a fellow award granted by United States Artists.

In 2008, Hoch's solo show Taking Over addresses the issue of social imbalance as viewed by people who are pushed out by gentrification in Williamsburg, Brooklyn.

In late 2011 to early 2012, Hoch appeared in Ethan Coen's one-act play "Talking Cure" presented as part of Relatively Speaking.

== Appearances in other media ==
Like the subject of most of Hoch's monologues, his writings often examine topics in hip hop, race, and class, and he has been published in The Village Voice, The New York Times, Harper's, and The Nation.

He has been featured on HBO's Def Poetry Jam, in addition to his Some People being broadcast on that station. The film version of Hoch's Jails, Hospitals & Hip-Hop was released in 2000.

Hoch was cast in a guest role on a 1995 episode of Seinfeld, (season seven, "The Pool Guy"), but he objected to what he felt was ethnic stereotyping in the way his Hispanic character was written, so tried to convince Jerry Seinfeld to change things. Hoch was eventually recast with another actor, with the show telling Hoch to find his own way back to New York City and paying him $0.

Hoch appeared in Spike Lee's film Bamboozled as Timmi Hilnigger, a parody of Tommy Hilfiger, who proudly sells overpriced designer clothing to African Americans, claiming, "We keep it so real, we even give you the bullet holes", and advising viewers to "stay broke, never get out of the ghetto, and continue to contribute to my multimillion-dollar corporation."

He is also known for writing Whiteboyz, a limited-released 1999 film directed by Marc Levin, in which Hoch also stars with Mark Webber and Dash Mihok as three White Iowa teenagers who long for a gangsta rap life. The film also stars Piper Perabo and Eugene Byrd, and rappers Snoop Doggy Dogg, Big Pun, Fat Joe, dead prez, Slick Rick, and Doug E. Fresh.

Hoch appeared on Robert Small's MTV Unplugged spoken-word series.

== Personal life ==
Hoch, who is Jewish, grew up in Queens.

== Filmography ==
Year	Title	Role	Notes
1996	Sureshot		
1997	Subway Stories	Edward (segment "Honey-Getter")	Made-for-television movie
1997	His and Hers	Lenny	
1998	The Thin Red Line	Pvt. Hugo Carni	Directed by Terrence Malick
1999	Whiteboyz	Flip	Also writer
2000	Jails, Hospitals, & Hip-Hop		Writer, director
2000	Bamboozled	Timmi Hillnigger	Directed by Spike Lee
2001	Black Hawk Down	SPC Dominick Pilla	Directed by Ridley Scott
2001	Prison Song	Harris	
2001	3 A.M.	Father	
2002	Washington Heights	Mickey	Award-winning independent film
2003	American Splendor	Marty	Also starring Paul Giamatti
2003	Law & Order: Special Victims Unit	Kracker	Television series; episode "Soulless"
2003	The Other Shoe	Abraham	
2003–2004	Def Poetry Jam	Himself	Two episodes
2005	War of the Worlds	Cop	Directed by Steven Spielberg
2005	Bam Bam and Celeste	Neo-Nazi	
2006	Wyclef Jean in America		Television series; writer
2007	We Own the Night	Louis "Jumbo" Falsetti	
2007	Lucky You	Bobby Basketball	
2007	Blackbird	Pinchback	
2009	Taking Chance	TSA Agent	
2010	Blue Bloods	Billy Leo	Television series; episode "Officer Down"
2010	Henry's Crime	Joe	
2011	Violet & Daisy	Man #4	
2011	Nurse Jackie	Mr. Digby	Television series; episode "...Deaf Blind Tumor Pee-Test"
2012	Safe	Julius Barkow	
2012	Ted	Donny's Father	Uncredited
2014	The Knick	Bunky Collier	Television series; five episodes
2016	Gotham	Pharmacist	Television series; episode "Mr. Freeze"
2016	Exposed	Detective Joey Cullen	
2016	Wolves	Sean	
2016	Barry	Eddie	
2017–2019	She's Gotta Have It	Dean "Onyx" Haggen	3 episodes
2018	Maniac	Alexander	Miniseries; 9 episodes
2018	BlacKkKlansman	Agent Y	
2019	Goldie	Frank	
2023	Full Circle	Ron Cuneo	Miniseries; 4 episodes
