= Mark Benjamin =

American documentary filmmaker

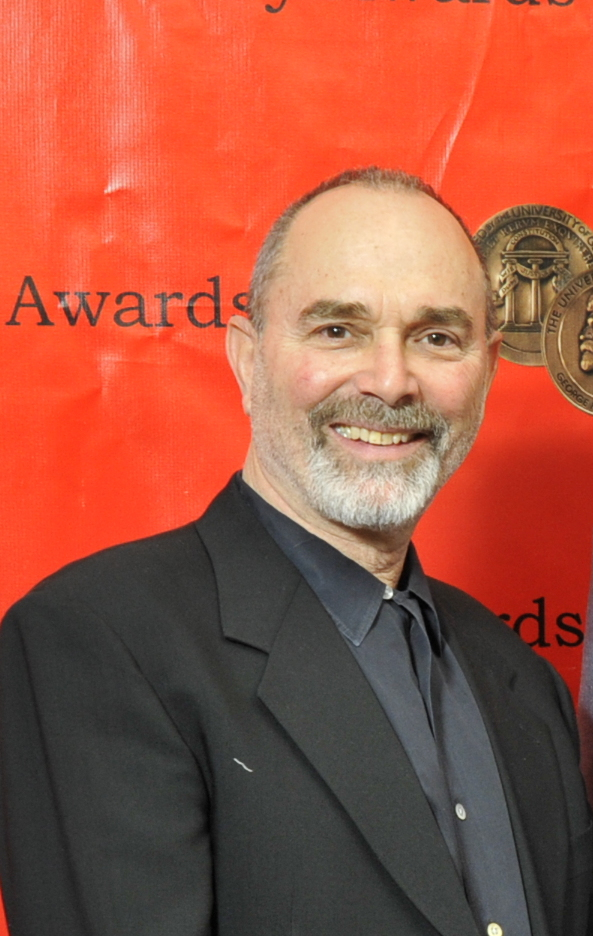
- Benjamin at the 69th Annual Peabody Awards in 2010
- Born: 1947 (age 78–79)
- Occupations: Film director, producer, cinematographer
- Years active: 1974–present

Mark Benjamin (born 1947) is an American documentary filmmaker best known for his Peabody Award-winning, Sundance TV series Brick City and the feature film Slam. His most recent television series, Ocean Warriors aired on Animal Planet in 2016.

In 2018, Benjamin co-directed, with Marc Levin, the feature documentary Chasing the Thunder, which follows Sea Shepherd Conservation Society captains during a 110-day, 10,000-nautical-mile pursuit of the poaching vessel Thunder from Antarctica to West Africa. The film premiered at EarthxFilm in 2018 and had a wider streaming release on Discovery+ in 2021.

In 2025, Benjamin co-directed, with Katie Carpenter, the documentary Fatal Watch, which investigates the deaths and disappearances of fisheries observers monitoring the international tuna industry and examines broader issues of over-fishing and transparency in commercial fishing. The film premiered on March 21, 2025, at the Sonoma International Film Festival and screened on March 24, 2025, at the DC Environmental Film Festival. It was covered in interviews on Radio New Zealand and Mongabay, and received a Certificate of Merit in the Donald Gosling Award for Best Audio-Visual Production category at The Maritime Foundation's 2025 Maritime Media Awards.

- Fatal Watch official website

Over his career, Benjamin's work has also received multiple duPont–Columbia Awards and Emmy Awards, and Ocean Warriors won the Best Series award at the Jackson Wild Media Awards. Chasing the Thunder screened in more than 200 cities worldwide and was named a finalist for the United Nations' World Wildlife Day Film Showcase: Living Oceans.

== Film and television ==
Year	Project	Network	Credit	Festivals and Project Awards
1974	Lamp Unto My Feet: My Father's House	CBS	Director, Director of Photography	
1975	Cold Frame	CBS	Director, Director of Photography	Shown in the Basel Art Fair
1975	Lamp Unto My Feet: Twice Promised Land	CBS	Producer, Director, Director of Photography	
1977	Jerusalem Peace	PBS	Producer, Director, Director of Photography	Chicago Film Festival, The Museum of Modern Art - Director's Series
1979	Bill Moyers Journal - The People of Nes Ammim	PBS	Producer, Director	
1980	Bill Moyers Journal - Women Inside	PBS	Producer, Director	American Film Festival - Blue Ribbon
1980	Bill Moyers Journal - Barry Commoner: The Politics of Energy	PBS	Producer, Director	
1980	Bill Moyers Journal - Campaign Report: Watts	PBS	Producer, Director	
1980	Bill Moyers Journal - Campaign Report: Ronald Reagan	PBS	Producer, Director	
1980	Bill Moyers Journal - Campaign Report: Jimmy Carter	PBS	Producer, Director	
1980	Bill Moyers Journal - Evangelicals and the Right	PBS	Producer, Director	
1980	We are the Guinea Pigs	PBS	Director of Photography	
1980	The New Immigrants Series	PBS	Director of Photography	New York Emmy
1981	NBC White Paper: Crisis in Black America	NBC	Director of Photography	Monte Carlo Film and Television Festival
1982	Creativity with Bill Moyers - Performing Arts High School	PBS	Director, Director of Photography	Primetime Emmy - WON
1982	Portrait of an American Zealot	PBS	Director of Photography	Included in the Museum of Modern Art's permanent film collection, Cinema du Real, Carnegie Hall Cinema
1983	Portrait of America - Puerto Rico	TBS	Director, Director of Photography	Peabody Award Winner, CINE Golden Eagle
1984	Los Sures	PBS	Director of Photography	New York Film Festival, American Film Festival - Blue Ribbon, Global Village Festival
1985	Wall Street Connection	WCBS	Director of Photography	Emmy - Outstanding Documentary (nominated)
1985	National Geographic Explorer: Smoke Jumpers	National Geographic Society	Producer, Director	
1986	Frontline - Inside the Jury Room	PBS	Director of Photography	Blue Ribbon Award, American Film and Video Festival Monitor Award Best Public Affairs Program (nominated) and Best Editing (nominated)
1987	National Geographic's Atocha: Quest for Treasure	National Geographic Society	Director of Photography	American Film Festival, Houston Film Festival - Best Documentary Film, Cine Golden Eagle
1988	The Secret Government: The Constitution in Crisis	PBS	Director of Photography	American Film Festival, Blue Ribbon Awards, Best Film - WON, News & Documentary Emmy Awards - WON
1988	Comedy's Dirtiest Dozen	HBO	Director of Photography	
1988	Mondo New York	Island Picture	Camera Operator	
1988	Driving Me Crazy	TMG	Additional Camera	
1989	How to Raise a Drug Free Kid	HBO	Director of Photography	ACE Award - Educational Special (WON)
1989	Badlands		Director of Photography	Monitor Award
1990	Takeover	PBS	Director of Photography	Sundance Film Festival
1991	Blowback		Director of Photography	
1991	The Home Front with Bill Moyers	PBS	Director of Photography	duPont-Columbia Award - Gold Baton
1992	Damned in the USA	PBS	Director of Photography	WINNER International Emmy Best Arts Documentary 1991, WINNER Silver Plaque Chicago International Festival 1991, WINNER Melbourne Festival 1991, Edinburgh Film Festival 1991, Margaret Mead Film Festival, New York 1991, Amsterdam International Documentary Film Festival 1991, Rotterdam Film Festival 1992, Cork Film Festival 1991, Human Rights Watch Film Festival, New York 1992
1993	The Last Party	Triton/ Live Home Video	Director, Director of Photography	Mill Valley Film Festival
1994	Gang War: Bangin' in Little Rock	HBO	Director of Photography	CableACE Award for Best Documentary, Silver Medal for Best Documentary, Houston International Film Festival||
1994	A Time of AIDS	The Discovery Channel	Director of Photography	International Emmy - WON
1995	Talking Sex	HBO	Director of Photography	National Emmy
1995	VH1's The Goods by Todd Oldham	VH1	Producer, Director	
1996	Prisoners of the War on Drugs	HBO	Director of Photography	
1997	CIA: America's Secret Warriors	Discovery Channel	Director of Photography	duPont-Columbia Award, CableACE - Best Director (nominated)
1997-2001	Egg The Arts Show/ City Arts	PBS	Director of Photography	New York Emmy Award - series
1998	Dead Blue: Surviving Depression	HBO	Director of Photography	Emmy Award: Outstanding Documentary Or Nonfiction Special - WON
1998	Naked City: Justice with a Bullet	Paramount Television, Magnum Productions	Additional Photography	
1998	Slam	Lions Gate	Director of Photography	New York Film Festival, Grand Jury Prize - Sundance Film Festival, Camera D'Or & Prix du Public - Cannes Film Festival, 1998 Black Film and Video Network's Reel Black Award
1999	Thug Life in D.C.	HBO	Director of Photography	Emmy for Outstanding Non-Fiction Special, National Council on Crime and Delinquency PASS Award, First Place Winner 32nd Annual Media Awards Competition, National Council on Family Relations
1999	Whiteboyz	20th Century Fox	Director of Photography	
2000	Jails, Hospitals & Hip-Hop		Producer, Director, Director of Photography	Urban World Film Festival, Latino Film Festival, Santa Fe Film Festival
2000	Soldiers in the Army of God	HBO	Director of Photography	NARAL Courageous Advocate Award
2000	EGG, The Arts Show: Who Am I?	PBS	Producer	
2001	Brooklyn Babylon	Lions Gate, Artisan Entertainment, Canal +	Director of Photography	Slamdance (Opening Night film), Hawaii International Film Festival
2001	School's In	Disney Channel	Producer, Director, Director of Photography	
2002	Middle School Confessions	HBO Family	Additional Camera	
2002	Gladiator Days: Anatomy of a Prison Murder	HBO	Director of Photography	
2002	The Trials of Henry Kissinger	BBC	Director of Photography	Amsterdam International Documentary Film Festival 2002: Amnesty International - DOEN Award - WON, Independent Spirit Awards 2003 - Truer Than Fiction Award - NOMINATED
2003	Hooked: The Legend of Demetrius Hook Mitchell		Director of Photography	Tribeca Film Festival
2003	The Blues: Godfathers and Sons	PBS	Director of Photography	Venice Film Festival, Sundance Film Festival
2003	Dave Mathews Band: The Central Park Concert	RCA Records Label	Camera Operator	
2003	Retrospective		Director, Cameraman	Edison Film Festival
2003	Going Home	HBO	Director, Director of Photography	Contemporary Documentary Series — presented by the Academy of Motion Picture Arts & Sciences, the Academy Foundation and the UCLA Film & Television Archive
2004	On the Outs	Fader Films, Youth House Productions	Director of Photography - 2nd Unit	Toronto Film Festival
2004	The First Amendment Project: Poetic License	PBS	Director of Photography	
2004	America Undercover: Back in the Hood: Gang War II	HBO	Director of Photography	
2004	Art in Progress: Philip Pearlstein		Director of Photography	
2005	Protocols of Zion	HBO/Cinemax and ThinkFilm	Director of Photography	Berlin Film Festival, Sundance, Gold Hugo - Chicago International Film Festival (Best Documentary - nominated)
2005	The American Ruling Class	The Alive Mind	Director of Photography	Aired on Sundance Channel
2007	The Music in Me: A Family Special	HBO Family	Director, Director of Photography	Peabody Award Winner
2008	Why We Fight Now	Military Channel	Director, Director of Photography	
2009	Brick City - Season 1	SundanceTV	Executive Producer, Director	2009 Peabody Award Winner, 2010 Golden Eagle Cine Award, Emmy - Exceptional Merit in Nonfiction Filmmaking (nominated),[17] NAACP Image Award (nominated), International Documentary Association (IDA) 2010 - Continuing Series (nominated)
2010	Dirty Old Town		Producer	New York Independent Film Festival, Royal Flush Film Festival
2010	Brick City Season 2	SundanceTV	Executive Producer, Director	TIME - Top Television Shows of 2011 (Honorable Mention),[21] 2012 News and Documentary Emmy for "Outstanding Informational Programming - Long Form" (nominated)
2011	The After Party: The Last Party 3		Cameraman	New York Los Angeles International Film Festival - Best Documentary Feature - WINNER, Duke City DocFest - Freedom of Speech Award - WINNER, Los Angeles Cinema Festival of Hollywood - Best Documentary Feature - WINNER, ThrillSpy International Film Festival - Best Documentary - WINNER
2012	Second Coming?: Will Black America Decide the 2012 Election	BET	Executive Producer, Director	Cronkite Award - National Network Programming - BET (awarded as part of the network's election coverage)
2013	Jersey Strong	Pivot	Executive Producer, Director	
2013	Flex is Kings		Consulting Producer	Tribeca Film Festival, Somerville Subterranean Cinema
2014	Chicagoland	CNN	Executive Producer, Director, Director of Photography	Silver Hugo Award - Chicago International Film Festival 2014 IDA: International Documentary Association: Best Limited Series Award - Nominated
2016	Rikers	PBS	Producer, Director of Photography	DOCNYC, 2017 Robert F. Kennedy Journalism Award
2016	Oceans Warriors	Animal Planet / Discovery	Executive Producer, Director	Best Long Form Series Award, Jackson Hole
2018	Chasing the Thunder	Discovery+ / Vulcan Productions	Co-Director	EarthxFilm
2019	Crystal City	Gravitas Ventures	Executive Producer	Nominated, Global Health Award, Cleveland International Film Festival
2025	Fatal Watch	Journeyman Pictures	Co-Director, Producer	Certificate of Merit, Donald Gosling Award, Maritime Media Awards
