= Blowback Productions =

American film and television production company

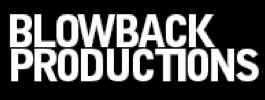
- Company type: Independent
- Industry: Film production Television production
- Founded: 1988
- Founder: Marc Levin
- Headquarters: New York City, New York, United States
- Key people: Marc Levin; Daphne Pinkerson
- Website: blowbackproductions.com

Blowback Productions is an independent film and television production company founded in 1988 by Marc Levin. Levin and his producing partner Daphne Pinkerson have made over 30 films and won numerous awards. For over 20 years, Blowback Productions has operated out of the 17th floor of the landmark Starrett-Lehigh Building on 26th Street and the Hudson River.

Some of their most notable works include Godfathers and Sons (2003) which aired on PBS, Brick City (2009) which aired on the Sundance Channel, and Triangle: Remembering the Fire (2011) which aired on HBO and CNN.
