= Marc Levin =

American film director (born 1951)

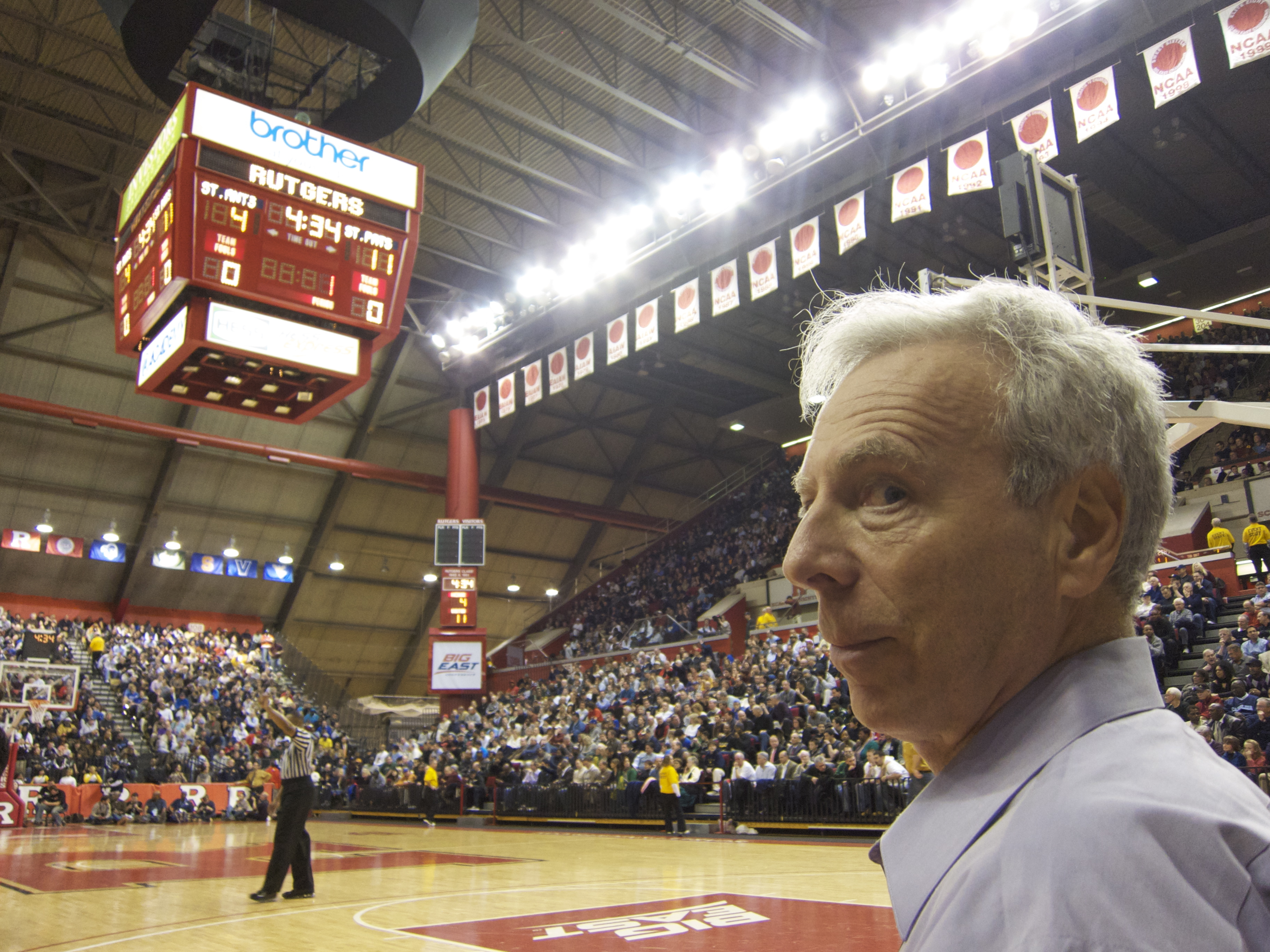
- Levin at the Rutgers Athletic Center in 2011
- Born: January 31, 1951 (age 75); New York City, U.S.
- Occupations: Director, producer, screenwriter
- Website: blowbackproductions.com

Marc Levin (born January 31, 1951), is an American independent film producer and director. He is best known for his Brick City TV series, which won the 2010 Peabody award and was nominated for an Emmy for Exceptional Merit in Nonfiction Filmmaking and his dramatic feature film, Slam, which won the Grand Jury Prize at the Sundance Film Festival and the Caméra d'Or at Cannes in 1998. He also has received three Emmy Awards (1988, 1989, 1999) and the 1997 DuPont-Columbia Award.

== Early life and education ==
Levin was born January 31, 1951, in Manhattan in New York City and was raised in an Italian-American neighborhood in Elizabeth until his family moved to Maplewood, New Jersey, the son of documentary filmmaker Alan Levin. He graduated from Columbia High School, where he played on the school's basketball team. He attended Wesleyan University (class of 1973), and has described the university as key in shaping his career in film. Marc was raised Jewish.

== Career ==
=== 1980s ===
In 1982, Levin and his father, Al, teamed up on Portrait of an American Zealot which was made part of the Museum of Modern Art's permanent film collection. In 1984, he made Inside Story: Fall River Spectacle for PBS which won the Cine Golden Eagle Award. In 1985, he received an Emmy nomination for Outstanding Documentary for the WCBS TV Special The Wall Street Connection. In 1989, Levin was awarded a writing Emmy for the WCBS TV Special New York Non-Stop as well as a nomination for Outstanding Magazine Show (Non-News).

=== 1990s ===
Blowback was released in 1991. In this black comedy, an insane scientist, Dr. Krack, creates an orgasm-inducing O-bomb and threatens to detonate it. The only ones who can stop him are a drug-dealing ex-CIA agent and the woman he meets in a rehab center.

In 1992, Levin directed Robert Downey, Jr. in The Last Party, a gonzo look at the Presidential campaign, weaving together the personal and the political fortunes of Downey and Bill Clinton.

In 1997, Levin was awarded the duPont-Columbia award for CIA: America's Secret Warriors, a three-part series that aired on the Discovery Channel.

In the late nineties Levin created a hip-hop trilogy beginning with Slam, a searing prison drama, which starred Saul Williams, Sonja Sohn, and Bonz Malone.

Followed in 1999 by Brooklyn Babylon, a fable inspired by the “Song of Songs,” starred Tariq Trotter, Bonz Malone, and featured music by The Roots.

In 2000, Levin directed Whiteboyz, a comedy about white kids who want to be black rappers, starred Danny Hoch, Dash Mihok, Mark Webber, and Piper Perabo.

=== 2000s ===
In Twilight Los Angeles, an adaptation of Anna Deavere Smith's one-woman show, Levin fused a Broadway play with a documentary look at the 1992 Los Angeles riots. Twilight premiered at the Sundance 2000 Film Festival and was selected as the opening film of the International Human Rights Film Festival at Lincoln Center.

Levin's Street Time, a 2002 television series produced by Columbia/Tristar for Showtime, received critical acclaim for its authenticity and cinéma vérité style. Levin executive produced the series and directed 10 episodes. The show stars Rob Morrow, Scott Cohen, Erica Alexander and Terrence Howard.

Levin's documentary feature, The Blues: Godfathers and Sons (2003), was part of the highly regarded Martin Scorsese PBS series, The Blues. Scorsese recruited an international team of directors with both feature and documentary experience - Charles Burnett, Clint Eastwood, Mike Figgis, Richard Pearce and Wim Wenders.

Levin made his on-camera debut in Protocols of Zion, his street level look at the rise of anti-Semitism since 9/11 and the renewed popularity of the anti-Semitic text, The Protocols of the Elders of Zion. The film premiered at the Sundance Film Festival, was released theatrically in the fall of 2005 and on HBO the spring of 2006.

Mr. Untouchable, the story of Nicky Barnes, was released in theatres in 2007. It tells the true-life story of a real American Gangster from the point of view of law enforcement, associates, and Barnes, who appears for the first time in over a quarter century.

In 2008 Levin was executive producer alongside Beyoncé Knowles on Cadillac Records, the Chess Records story starring Jeffrey Wright, Adrien Brody, and Beyoncé. In the same year he executive produced the indie feature documentary Captured, the story of artist activist Clayton Patterson, the man who videotaped the 1988 Tompkins Square Park Riot and who has dedicated his life to documenting the final era of raw creativity and lawlessness in New York City's Lower East Side, a neighborhood famed for art, music and revolutionary minds. Levin executive produced a follow-up feature in 2010, Dirty Old Town by his son Daniel B. Levin, Jenner Furst and Julia Nason.

Levin's Brick City is a ground-breaking docu-series about the city of Newark, New Jersey, its mayor, Cory Booker, and the people on the frontlines of a city struggling to change. Executive produced with Forest Whitaker, the 5-hour series aired its first Peabody Award winning season on the Sundance Channel in September 2009. The show also received a 2010 Golden Eagle Cine Award and was nominated for both an Emmy for Exceptional Merit in Nonfiction Filmmaking and an NAACP Image Award. The second season premiered on January 30, 2011.

Levin also periodically directed episodes of the classic TV series, Law and Order.

=== Work with Bill Moyers ===
From the mid-seventies through the eighties he teamed up with journalist Bill Moyers. In 1988 Levin won a national Emmy award as a producer/editor of Moyers' The Secret Government - The Constitution in Crisis. He directed The Home Front with Bill Moyers, which was honored with the duPont-Columbia Gold Baton Award in 1992.

=== Work with Daphne Pinkerson ===
Levin and his documentary film partner, Daphne Pinkerson, have produced 11 films for HBO's documentary film division, including Triangle: Remembering the Fire, Schmatta: Rags to Riches to Rags, Mob Stories, Prisoners of the War on Drugs, The Execution Machine: Texas Death Row, Soldiers in the Army of God, Gladiator Days (see "Troy Kell"), and An American Bombing: The Road to April 19th. Thug Life in D.C. won the 1999 National Emmy for Outstanding Non-Fiction Special. Gang War: Bangin' in Little Rock won the CableACE Award for Best Documentary Special of 1994. The sequel, Back in the Hood, premiered on HBO ten years later. They also produced Heir to an Execution, a documentary feature following Ivy Meeropol’s journey on the 50th anniversary of the execution of her grandparents, Julius and Ethel Rosenberg. Heir was in competition at the Sundance film festival and aired on HBO.

=== Recent ===
Levin continued his 20-year working relationship with HBO: Hard Times: Lost on Long Island in 2011, Prayer for a Perfect Season in 2012 and Class Divide in 2015. He also co-produced the 2017 documentary Baltimore Rising directed by Sonja Sohn. In 2025, Levin was a writer and a producer for the PBS documentary Hard Hat Riot.
