= List of Tracey Ullman's Show episodes =

Tracey Ullman's Show is a British sketch comedy television show devised by and starring Tracey Ullman. The show marks her first project for the BBC in over thirty years. The programme premiered on BBC One 11 January 2016. Series 3 premiered on HBO in the United States 28 September 2018.

== Series overview ==
Series	Episodes	Originally released	
Series	Episodes	First released	Last released
1	6	11 January 2016	15 February 2016
Special		25 December 2016	
2	6	3 February 2017	17 March 2017
3	6	28 September 2018	2 November 2018

== Episodes ==
=== Series 1 (2016) ===
No. overall	No. in series	Title	Directed by	Written by	Original release date	U.K. viewers (millions)
1	1	"Episode 1"	Dominic Brigstocke	Kevin Cecil, Andy Riley, Georgia Pritchett, Oliver Vance, Lucy Montgomery, Arthur Mathews, Laurence Rickard	11 January 2016	2.9
Dame Judi Dench is caught shoplifting. A woman seemingly on the phone holds up a sign to a homeless man which reads: "Pretending to Make Phone Call". Karen, a woman who'd been imprisoned for twenty-eight years in Thailand on a drugs charge returns home to Britain and is met by a bevy of reporters at the airport. Angela Merkel is unhappy about having to meet in Cardiff. Karen checks out her old bedroom. A masseuse manages to extinguish a fire unbeknownst to her client. A woman is questioned about her CV during a job interview. Karen has a flashback. Dame Maggie Smith auditions for science fiction movies. Hayley is caught trying to take a penguin home with her. Sally is convinced to cover-up. Karen pays Barry a visit. Dame Judi destroys Rupert Grint's tablet. Angela Merkel leaves an angry voicemail to Nicola Sturgeon. A tap dance and operetta send-off for a library's closure. Karen's mum reassures her that she and her shampoo are safe. Guest star: Rupert Grint as Himself
2	2	"Episode 2"	Dominic Brigstocke	Georgia Pritchett, Jonathan Harvey, Jeremy Dyson, Kevin Cecil, Andy Riley, Gemma Arrowsmith, Carrie Quinlan, Laurence Rickard	18 January 2016	2.4
Camilla Parker Bowles agrees to watch Prince George. A man smuggles himself into the UK via the bottom of a couple's camper. A woman holds up a sign to a homeless man which reads "Rich and Callous" and walks off. Dame Judi Dench vandalises the hotel toilets. Colin and Christine discuss what to do about Allende. Prince George arrives. Dominic runs into an old co-worker. Dame Maggie Smith auditions for James Bond. A course in online bullying for seniors. Line judging with Margaret McDonald. Allende watches EastEnders. Prince George plays with a tractor. A real estate agent tries to persuade Kay to put her house on the market. A woman passing a homeless man holds a sign reading: "I gave all my money to the bloke round the corner with the dog." A tour guide reveals the history behind Henry the VIII's bed. Prince George makes off with a ruby. Angela Merkel sings for the staff. Christine locks Allende in for the night. Guest star: Steve Pemberton as Colin
3	3	"Episode 3"	Dominic Brigstocke	Jeremy Dyson, Georgia Pritchett, Laurence Rickard, Andy Riley, Kevin Cecil, Bert Tyler-Moore, George Jeffrie, Jonathan Harvey	25 January 2016	1.8
Jacki and Hal arrive at their hotel. A woman passing a homeless man holds a sign which says: "Trying Not to Catch Your Eye". Sally Preston hosts her first constituency surgery topless. Dame Maggie Smith auditions in a motion capture suit. Kay waits patiently with her mother in hospital. Jacki and Hal inspect ads found in a telephone box. A reporter interviews the woman behind Bridget Sweeney Ceramics. Steph spots the perfect girl for her company in a shopping mall. Dame Judi Dench sneaks into a cinema. Hayley feeds the chickens. Dominic tries to sell his latest app idea. Kay continues to wait. Jackie and Hal make a discovery. Two masseuses fight over a bottle of oil. Steph spots a girl on a road. Rebekah Brooks is almost burned at the stake. Kay and her mother have been forced to take a new number as they filled out a form incorrectly. Jacki and Hal make yet another discovery. Guest star: Michael Brandon as Hal
4	4	"Episode 4"	Dominic Brigstocke	Lucy Montgomery, George Jeffrie, Bert Tyler-Moore, Kevin Cevil, Andy Riley, Oliver Vance, Jonathan Harvey, Georgia Pritchett, Carrie Quinlan	1 February 2016	1.8
Soraya Al Amir, an overthrown dictator's wife, attempts to start a new life in Hounslow with her son. A working-class drama teacher becomes frustrated trying to teach posh students. Illifat prepares for his first day of school. Dominic interviews a potential intern. Dora catches the bus. Hayley shows off a barn owl. Soraya FaceTimes with her husband. Dora makes it to Norman's. Three women wait to audition for a primetime BBC drama. Birgit shows Angela Merkel photos from her trip to the Doctor Who Experience. Hayley presents a scrapbook to a turtle. Soraya is ambushed in public. Dame Maggie Smith's audition reel. Dora gets confused. Margaret McDonald on grunting. Four women wait to audition for a primetime sitcom. Dora forgets why she's entered a sex shop. Soraya attempts to comfort Illifat after his first day of school. Angela remembers Germany winning the Eurovision Song Contest 1982 and sings Nicole's "Ein bißchen Frieden".
5	5	"Episode 5"	Dominic Brigstocke	Georgia Pritchett, Andy Riley, Kevin Cecil, Laurence Rickard, Jeremy Dyson, Katherine Jakeways	8 February 2016	1.7
Kay attempts to conceal her smoking from her mother. It's the Middletons turn to watch Prince George for the day. Dominic arrives for work at the cafe. Dame Maggie Smith auditions for an action movie franchise. Dominic reveals what happened at his old job. Sally Preston meets with the Shadow Cabinet. Jacki and Hal are taken with British currency. Carole takes Prince George into the warehouse. Hayley demands to know more before allowing a squirrel monkey off to be mated. Sally does an interview. Dame Judi Dench keys a car. Hayley shows off meerkats. A tour guide discusses a portrait. Sally offers her support for an anti-Page 3 group. A vicar uses a woman's social media account for her eulogy. Michael discovers Carole and Prince George in the warehouse. Jacki and Hal are taken with a gas holder. Dominic is thrown out of the cafe. Prince George is picked up. A very modern murder horror tour. Sally arrives home. Hal figures out how to turn their American shower English. Guest star: Michael Brandon as Hal
6	6	"Episode 6"	Dominic Brigstocke	Jonathan Harvey, Andy Riley, Kevin Cecil, Georgia Pritchett, Laurence Rickard, Carrie Quinlan	15 February 2016	1.4
Northern powerhouse, Pam Garrity, speaks at a school about her 38 ½ businesses. Dame Maggie Smith shows off her many voices. A woman explains to a homeless man why she give him money via signs. Pam goes for fillers at Pam-Per. Dame Judi Dench wreaks havoc on a bus. A couple interviews at a school for the children of various dictators and oligarchs. Pam stops by Glam Pam. Hayley shows off a rabbit to children at the zoo. Steph thinks she's found perfect girl. A masseuse devours a pizza while giving a massage. A stately homes tour guide thinks she found love. Margaret McDonald shows how not to crumble when hit by a high-speed serve. Pam is forced to turn down a gig because it takes place down South. Dominic celebrates one year at the cafe. Steph thinks she's found the perfect girl -- again. Kay decides that she's going to go out on her own for the first time without her mother since she was fourteen years old. Pam sings about her life.

=== Christmas special (2016) ===
No.	Title	Directed by	Written by	Original release date	U.K. viewers (millions)
7	"The Best of Tracey Ullman's Show"	Dominic Brigstocke & Nick Collett	Gemma Arrowsmith, Kevin Cecil & Andy Riley, Jeremy Dyson, Arthur Mathews, Georgia Pritchett, Laurence Rickard	25 December 2016	2.7
Clare Balding (Ullman) has volunteered to control the BBC's festive programming. She plays some of the best bits from series one of Tracey Ullman's Show: Dame Judi Dench shoplifting; a woman seemingly on her phone holds up a sign to a homeless which reads "Pretending to Make Phone Call"; Camilla looks after Prince George; Kay tries to hide her smoking habit from Mother; Angela and Birgit are forced to meet in Cardiff. Clare accidentally unplugs Radio 4. Best bits continue: Camilla; Silver Surfers; a woman holds up a sign to a homeless man which reads "Rich and Callous"; Jacki and Hal arrive at their hotel room; Prince George drives a tractor; library closing. Producer Sue asks Clare when was the last time she had a holiday. Dame Maggie Smith's Christmas message. Best bits continue: bank interview; Dame Judi Dench destroys Rupert Grint's tablet; a masseuse manages to extinguish a fire unbeknownst to her client; Angela performs for the staff. Producer Sue and Clare do something they've always wanted to do. Guest stars: Tracy-Ann Oberman as Producer Sue, Rupert Grint as Himself

=== Series 2 (2017) ===
No. overall	No. in series	Title	Directed by	Written by	Original release date	U.K. viewers (millions)
8	1	"Episode 1"	Dominic Brigstocke & Nick Collett	Gemma Arrowsmith, Abigail Burdess & Cicely Giddings, Kevin Cecil & Andy Riley, Jeremy Dyson, Laurence Howarth, Lucy Montgomery, Laurence Rickard	3 February 2017	4.05
Coming soon to BBC One: Another Mumbly Drama. Dame Judi Dench is arrested in the park. A good use of GCHQ resources? A barista takes an order. Clare Balding, who's just finished covering the Cheltenham Festival, figures out her diary for the week. Dame Judi is interrogated. Mabel counts her steps. The Murdoch Bunch. A woman on her deathbed wishes she had played more Candy Crush. Birgit tracks down Angela Merkel who is beside herself with grief. An indiscreet therapist. Dame Judi is placed in a jail cell. Dr Peluzzi sees a patient. A woman on a bus announces that she's on her way to Buckingham Palace to see the Queen. Nicola Sturgeon visits JK Rowling who she has trapped in her underground lair. Patricia, a Christian woman, is out on a date. Dame Maggie Smith visits Dame Judi Dench in prison. Guest star: Ben Miller as Rupert Murdoch
9	2	"Episode 2"	Dominic Brigstocke & Nick Collett	Gemma Arrowsmith, Kevin Cecil & Andy Riley, Jonathan Harvey, Katherine Jakeways, George Jeffrie & Bert Tyler Moore, Lucy Montgomery, Georgia Pritchett	10 February 2017	2.6
Gogglebooks. Too many options at the coffee shop. Camilla's Range Rover breaks down and she ends up clothes shopping in the sticks. Susie is demoted for bringing her cats to work. Kay and Mother's house becomes flooded during a storm – Mother refuses to leave. Dame Maggie Smith's vlog: "What's in the Bag". Pam Garrity meets her son's Southern fiance. Kay talks to a rescuer. The Ten Signs of Gentrification rap battle. A woman on her deathbed confesses that she wishes that she had taken more pictures of her lunch and put them online. Germaine Greer lashes at a bus stop. Susie conducts an interview with her cats present. Kay and Mother take shelter in the attic. A woman shops for a greeting card. It's movie night at the Murdochs. Kay and Mother are rescued but not before Kay finds an old postcard addressed to her. Best British Newcomer award for a working-class actor. Guest star: Ben Miller as Rupert Murdoch
10	3	"Episode 3"	Dominic Brigstocke & Nick Collett	Douglas Carter Beane, Kevin Cecil & Andy Riley, Jeremy Dyson, Lucy Montgomery, Georgia Pritchett	17 February 2017	2.34
Coming soon to BBC One: Someone Famous Goes Somewhere Nice. Security guard Leah is on duty. Name on cup: "Voted for Brexit". Dame Judi Dench is left alone in a china shop. Leah gives a presentation on safety and defence. Dame Maggie Smith's vlog: prank phone calls. The masseuse gets a marriage proposal during a session. Nicola Sturgeon, who's trying to copy Angela Merkel's look, offers Birgit a job. A woman wears an inappropriate shirt for a job interview to work at a play centre. Leah's skills are put to the test. Mabel shows off her smoothie maker. Birgit reveals the details of her meeting with Nicola to Angela. A song about disconnecting technology in our households. Bernice Rubin is in the UK to secure some Shakespeare for Broadway – but with a few changes. Leah gets a surprise. Germaine Greer is angry. A woman shows up to a funeral in an inappropriate shirt. The Murdochs play Murdoch-opoly. Leah blows out her birthday cake. Guest stars: Ben Miller as Rupert Murdoch, Anna Maxwell Martin as Herself
11	4	"Episode 4"	Dominic Brigstocke & Nick Collett	Abigail Burdess & Cicely Giddings, Kevin Cecil & Andy Riley, Jeremy Dyson, Laurence Howarth, George Jeffrie & Bert Tyler Moore, Lucy Montgomery, Georgia Pritchett	24 February 2017	1.88
Coming soon to BBC One: The Middle Ages in quite unnecessary detail. Pamela withdraws her application. Dame Maggie Smith's acting tips. Name on cup: Dick. Adele is too happy in the recording studio. Bernice meets with Sir Richard Appleworth to discuss a charity gala. A woman on her deathbed wishes that she had looked at more clickbait articles about celebrities with fat thighs. Adele almost gets inspired. An Uber driver picks up a passenger along with her children in the car. Indiscreet therapist, Sally acts out her latest session. Adele writes a song. A husband wants to trade places with his wife in prison in order to get out of taking care of their children. An unexpected Uber pickup. Germaine Greer reveals why she was thrown off a bus. Sally interrupts her patient to tell her receptionist what he's just told her. It's date night for the Murdochs. Nicola sings about world domination. Guest stars: Ben Miller as Rupert Murdoch, Nigel Havers as Sir Richard Appleworth
12	5	"Episode 5"	Dominic Brigstocke & Nick Collett	Kevin Cecil & Andy Riley, Jeremy Dyson, Jonathan Harvey, Laurence Howarth, Lucy Montgomery, Georgia Pritchett, The Pin	3 March 2017	2.34
Coming soon to BBC One, the latest in the documentary series – Why on Earth Would I Want To Watch That?: "Winter at the Morgue". Camilla looks after Princess Charlotte. More than just "Name on Cup?" The Murdochs pose for a family photo. A woman on her deathbed wishes she'd watched more reality shows. Camilla and Charlotte go shooting. Carla uses GCHQ resources to track her son's girlfriend. Dame Maggie Smith's makeup vlog. Mabel tries the caveman diet. A masseuse brings a baby to work. Bernice has a meeting about a possible co-production with the BBC. Camilla does some charity work. Pamela agrees to be a godmother. Dominic moves into a shared startup office. Camilla returns home. Nicola Sturgeon has kidnapped Simon Pegg. The dance troupe Hot Flange reunites after 40 years for a Top of the Pops tribute performance. Dame Judi Dench finds ways to entertain herself at an award ceremony. Guest stars: Ben Miller as Rupert Murdoch, Sinitta as Coffee
13	6	"Episode 6"	Dominic Brigstocke & Nick Collett	Gemma Arrowsmith, Abigail Burdess & Cicely Giddings, Kevin Cecil & Andy Riley, Jeremy Dyson, Jonathan Harvey, George Jeffrie & Bert Tyler Moore, Georgia Pritchett	17 March 2017	1.97
Later on BBC One: The Great British Boiled Egg. Carla attempts to use GCHQ resources to help her daughter pass an exam. Angela concludes her EU crisis meeting, while Birgit is ready for her open top bus tour of London. An art gallery opens for troubled artist Sharon Utley in her hometown. Pam Garrity's accountant is worried about her latest acquisition. Dame Maggie Smith's first-person shooter video game vlog. Therapist, Sally listens to a patient on her answering machine during a session. Sharon takes spectators to one of her art pieces on a crazy golf course. Angela joins Birgit on her open top bus tour. A man reports a mugging. Nicola Sturgeon kidnaps Andy Murray. Sharon finally gains the respects of Archie and admits to setting fire to the pier. Mabel passes out her all-natural muffins. Kay meets her cousin from Australia who's researching their family tree. Sharon has a new idea for an art installation. Angela and Birgit sing "99 Luftballons".

=== Series 3 (2018) ===
No. overall	No. in series	Title	Directed by	Written by	Original release date
14	1	"Episode 1"	Dominic Brigstocke	Gemma Arrowsmith, Jeremy Dyson, Kevin Cecil & Andy Riley, Laurence Howarth, Giles Pilbrow, Laurence Rickard, Brona C. Titley & Tony Cooke	28 September 2018
The future of the Star Wars franchise. Angela works on her poker face. Rupert discovers Jerry filling out a carer's allowance application form. Reporting on President of the United States Donald Trump. The Russians fly to Washington, D.C. to repair the Melania Bot. Alexis Teenage Edition. Why viewers watch The Great British Bake Off. Emmanuel Macron and Brigitte Macron take a trip down memory lane. Alexis Senior Edition. Theresa May Skypes with Donald Trump. Paddy Passports. Granny Camilla takes the royal sprogs to a play center. Alexis Long Term Relationship Edition. Sharon Osbourne tries to understand the new X Factor rules. Debate over female led television drama. Guest stars: Ben Miller as Rupert Murdoch, Anthony Atamanuik as Donald Trump
15	2	"Episode 2"	Dominic Brigstocke	Gemma Arrowsmith, Brona C. Titley & Tony Cooke, Kevin Cecil & Andy Riley, Laurence Howarth, Mike Hayley, Liam Hourican, Lucy Montgomery, Giles Pilbrow, Laurence Rickard	5 October 2018
The Some Sort of Therapy Centre. Rupert Murdoch returns home from a meeting at Disney. Oxbridge admissions committee are seeking diversity. Reporting on the Paradise Papers and Her Majesty's investments. Angela meets with Emmanuel Macron. Welcoming (and warning) foreigners to Russia for 2018 World Cup. Dame Judi Dench teaches Mark Rylance how to be a national treasure. Donations for Feminists Who Ruin Things Men Used to Like. Camilla pops over to the chemist. Coming soon to BBC One, Britain's Favourite Fatberg with Julie Walters. Appealing the license termination in London of Uber. A police constable discusses filming an abusive incident in portrait mode. Jacob Rees-Mogg takes a meeting in a restaurant, along with some help from Nanny. A hipster infestation. Tracey confronts a Twitter troll. Guest star: Ben Miller as Rupert Murdoch
16	3	"Episode 3"	Dominic Brigstocke	Gemma Arrowsmith, Brona C. Titley & Tony Cooke, Kevin Cecil & Andy Riley, Laurence Howarth, Katherine Jakeways, Will Maclean, Lucy Montgomery, Georgia Pritchett, Laurence Rickard	12 October 2018
The Overly-Woke Support Group. Schooling Eastern European workers how to act like British builders post-Brexit. Angela wonders if she's being paid as much as her male political counterparts. Reporting on further allegations on sexual misconduct. Jerry and the kids surprise Rupert for Father's Day. A glamour model-turn dolly bird agent reveals the push back against the dolly bird industry. A very unprepared, unqualified Gavin Williamson Secretary of State for Defence. Hollywood studio heads meet to discuss new code of conduct in the wake of Harvey Weinstein. Camilla calls the Queen to discuss Charles. Michael Gove takes part in a trust exercise. The Kremlin devises a new plan of attack on Western democracy. Theresa May struggles to stay focused. A social media family. Theresa and Philip are awakened by a phone call from Arlene Foster with more DUP demands. Guest star: Ben Miller as Rupert Murdoch
17	4	"Episode 4"	Dominic Brigstocke	Brona C. Titley & Tony Cooke, Kevin Cecil & Andy Riley, Laurence Howarth, Jeremy Dyson, Laurence Rickard	19 October 2018
Brexit negotiations - does Europe wish to keep anything British? Dame Judi Dench takes part in a tattoo-themed reality show to have an unfortunate tattoo altered. Reporting on something about China. Angela feels jaded after topping Forbes' World's 100 Most Powerful Women list. An Amazon representative confronts Gareth Southgate. Nicola's plan to turn golfers off of using Donald Trump's golf courses in Scotland. A woman applies to become Jacob Rees-Mogg's new housekeeper (or nanny). Russian headquarters try to fix a malfunctioning Melania Bot. Seeing an apartment you have no plans of moving into. Nicola's plan fails. A twist on university debt. The Melania Bot is flown back to Russia for maintenance. Jeremy Corbyn has an awkward reunion with an old friend. Theresa is convinced she's living in her own version of The Truman Show.
18	5	"Episode 5"	Dominic Brigstocke	Gemma Arrowsmith, Brona C. Titley & Tony Cooke, Kevin Cecil & Andy Riley, Laurence Howarth, Jeremy Dyson, Giles Pilbrow, Georgia Pritchett, Laurence Rickard, Nico Tatarowicz	26 October 2018
Theresa's Brexit Fudge. Not Everyone Thinks Exactly the Same As You Do support group. Reporting on Catalonia threatening to leave Spain - "Do you reckon he'll go through with it?" Angela worries about her image. Sexual harassment claims advert. Michael Gove helps an elderly woman cross the road. Coming soon: American Box Set. A woman tries to explain the Me Too movement to her male office co-workers with little success. Camilla goes shopping for her new "grand-sprog". Emmanuel Macron is worried about turning 40. Reporting on French swimmer Benoît Lecomte's attempt to swim across the Pacific Ocean. Michael Gove is asked to hold a ladder. A couple's smart home starts malfunctioning. Donald Trump ships himself to England. Reporting on a former British Airways Pilot who's been jailed for turning up to work after drinking three double vodkas. It's bathtime for Jacob Rees-Mogg. Nicola reveals her plan to use plastic to expand Scotland to Mhairi. Donald Trump, boxed up, hits the road. Guest star: Anthony Atamanuik as Donald Trump
19	6	"Episode 6"	Dominic Brigstocke	Simon Alcock, Gemma Arrowsmith, Brona C. Titley & Tony Cooke, Kevin Cecil & Andy Riley, Laurence Howarth, Katherine Jakeways, Giles Pilbrow, Georgia Pritchett, Laurence Rickard	2 November 2018
Theresa returns from her "cross party sleaze meeting". New from MP Games: Guess Who's Next? Angela Merkel Skypes with Donald Trump. Fortnite Battle Brexit. An actress is persuaded to make her award show appearance meaningful. Reporting on Qatar Airways CEO's sexist remark. Camilla hosts an Airbnb couple. Nursing in 2018. The Chair of Public Works begins detonating potentially offensive statues in London. Jeremy prepares for Labour Live. The Chair of Public Works deems Eros as potentially offensive. Recruiting mums for MI6. Camilla is pulled over for erratic driving. Polling the pollsters. Reporting on Donald Trump and Kim Jong Un meeting on Sentosa Island. A couple decides to hire Michael Gove as their babysitter. Theresa readies for a Halloween party. Guest star: Anthony Atamanuik as Donald Trump
