= James Adomian =

American comedian and actor (born 1980)

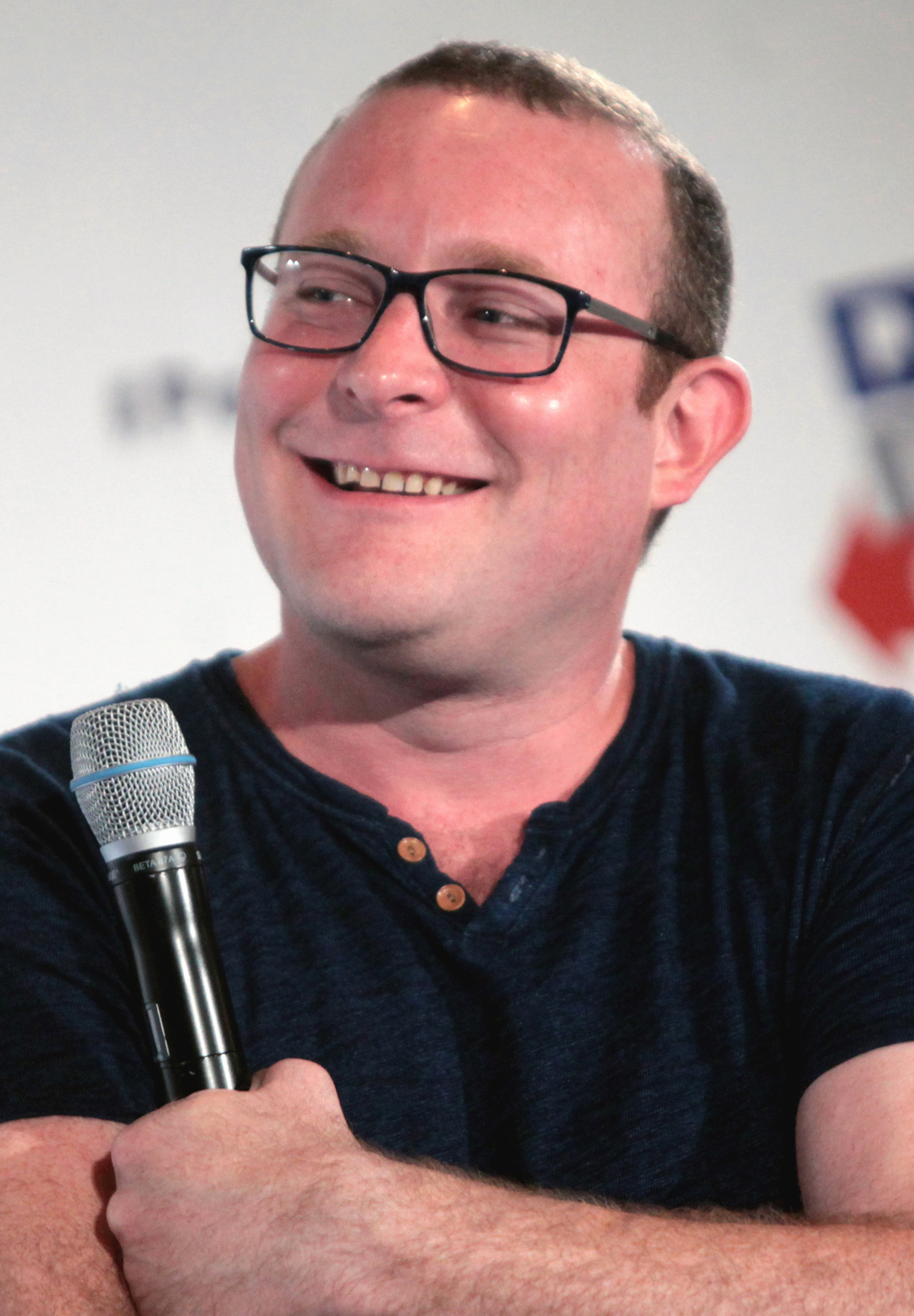
- Adomian in 2016
- Born: January 31, 1980 (age 46); Omaha, Nebraska, U.S.
- Occupations: Stand-up comedian; actor; impressionist
- Notable work: Trump vs. Bernie

Comedy career
- Years active: 2005–present
- Medium: Stand-up comedy, television
- Website: jamesadomian.com

James Adomian (born January 31, 1980) is an American stand-up comedian, actor, and impressionist. He is best known for his work on Comedy Bang! Bang!, Chapo Trap House, Last Comic Standing, The Late Late Show with Craig Ferguson where he impersonated President George W. Bush until 2009, and for portraying Bernie Sanders during the 2016 Trump vs. Bernie tour. He voiced Talking Ben in the Talking Tom & Friends animated series, and additional voices in the Nickelodeon animated series Pig Goat Banana Cricket.

== Early life ==
Adomian was born in Omaha, Nebraska, on January 31, 1980, and raised in Atlanta, Georgia. His family moved to Los Angeles when he was ten years old. Adomian is an alumnus of Los Angeles Baptist High School and attended Whittier College studying in a self-designed major in Economics and Theatre Arts. He notes that he did not graduate during a 2017 interview with Pete Holmes. Adomian is of partial Armenian descent.

== Career ==
Adomian began appearing as President George W. Bush frequently on The Late Late Show after Craig Ferguson took over hosting the show in January 2005 until 2009.

He has appeared on several other comedy programs, including MADtv, Mind of Mencia, Jimmy Kimmel Live!, Short Circuitz, Atom TV, Cavemen, Recount and Players. His appearances on Kimmel have included recurring portrayals of Mike Lindell. He is a recurring guest on Chapo Trap House, where he performs a Sebastian Gorka impression.

Adomian has appeared in the films Harold & Kumar Escape from Guantanamo Bay and Miss March.

As a voice-over artist, Adomian performed on The Onion Radio News, as several recurring characters on the PBS cartoon series WordGirl, as President Bush on a few episodes of MADtv, as Jimmy Kimmel on Celebrity Deathmatch, and on a number of other cartoons.

In 2011, he was cast as a co-lead in the unaired Kari Lizer pilot project for NBC alongside Sarah Paulson and Tim Meadows.

In 2012, Adomian appeared on Comedy Bang! Bang! as PBS broadcaster Huell Howser, on Adult Swim's Childrens Hospital as Madonna, and on MTV's Money from Strangers as himself, also making regular appearances as various sketch characters on Conan.

In 2018, Adomian was one of the headliners at the Portland Queer Comedy Festival.

For the Freddie Mercury episode of the 2019 Netflix program Historical Roasts, Adomian played the title character.

=== Stand-up comedy album ===
In 2012, Adomian released his debut comedy album Low Hangin Fruit. The release was the first album released by Earwolf, and received mostly positive reviews. The one-hour stand-up set features personal stories, a number of celebrity impressions and political material including observations regarding the cultural perceptions of LGBT people.

=== Live appearances ===
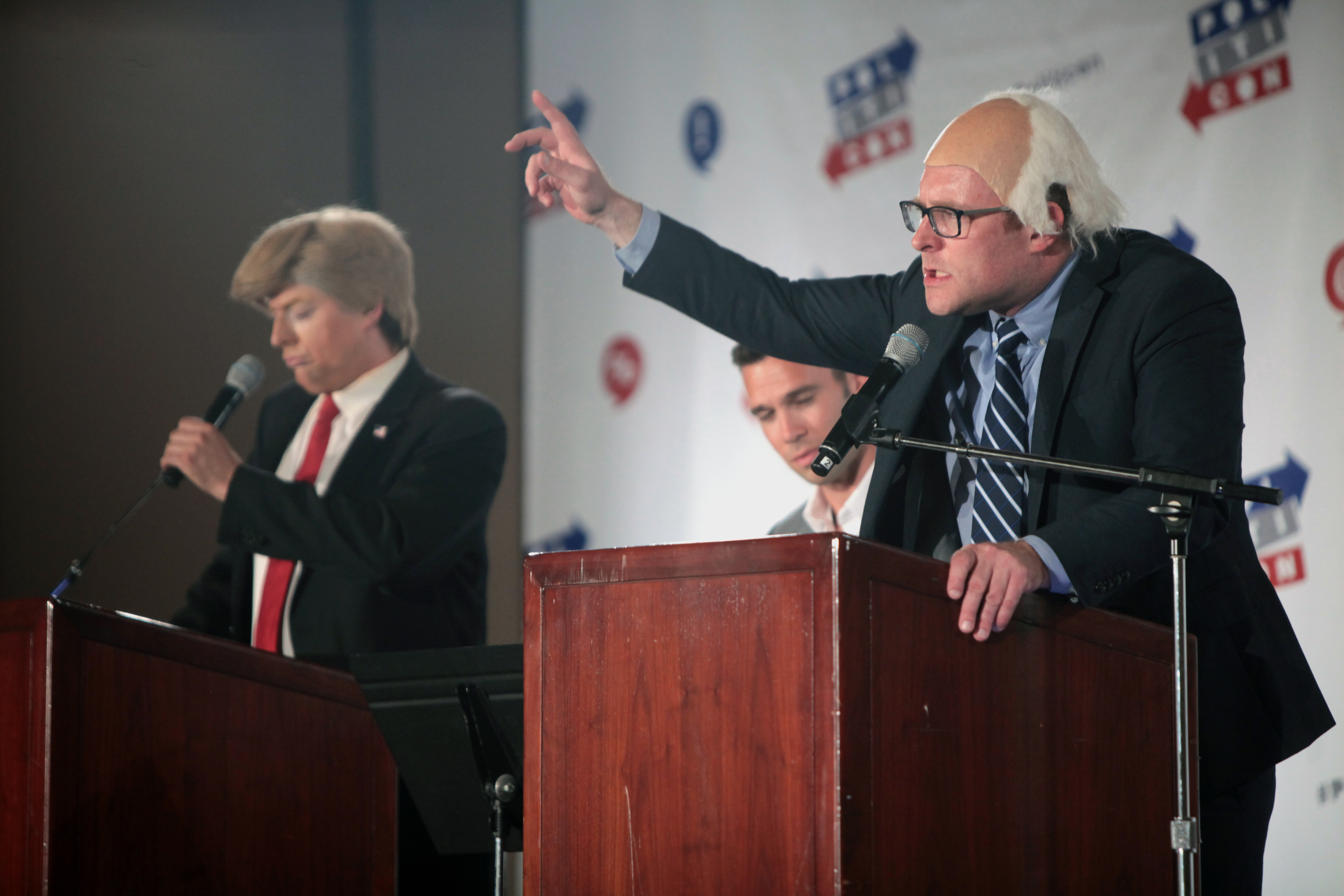
James Adomian (right) performing as Bernie Sanders, along with Anthony Atamanuik as Donald Trump at Politicon in Pasadena, California.

Adomian frequently performs live at Upright Citizens Brigade Theatre in sketch and stand-up shows such as Comedy Bang! Bang!, Who Charted?, and many others. He is also an alumnus of the Sunday Company at The Groundlings Theatre, where he still frequently performs. He also regularly performs at "The Tomorrow Show" and other stand-up shows in Hollywood. Adomian is known for doing many impressions at live shows, both in-costume and as part of his standup act, including Vincent Price, Lewis Black, Orson Welles, Jesse Ventura, Paul Giamatti, Michael Caine, Philip Seymour Hoffman, Sam Elliott, Al Franken, Huell Howser, Christopher Hitchens, Gary Busey, John McCain, Joe Lieberman, Marc Maron, Jimmy Kimmel, Andy Kindler, Tom Leykis, Todd Glass, George W. Bush, Bernie Sanders and Slavoj Žižek. He has performed several impressions as recurring characters on Comedy Bang! Bang!

Adomian often makes live appearances around the country doing standup or characters, particularly at left-wing political events like YearlyKos, Laughing Liberally, the National Conference for Media Reform and campaign events for Congressman Alan Grayson. In 2010, he made several live standup appearances across North America in the Breaking Even tour.

In 2008, he appeared with comedian Greg Giraldo at venues around the country as part of the Indecision '08 Tour produced by Comedy Central. He has performed at comedy festivals across North America, including Just for Laughs in Montreal. In March 2012, Adomian had his first overseas appearance, headlining a sold-out two night show in Seoul, South Korea for Stand Up Seoul.

Adomian toured the US with the Trump vs. Bernie tour in February–March 2016.

== Personal life ==
Adomian is gay. He is the grandson of Armenian-American mathematician George Adomian. He is a member of the Democratic Socialists of America.

== Filmography ==
=== Film ===
Year	Title	Role	Notes
2008	Harold & Kumar Escape from Guantanamo Bay	George W. Bush	
2009	Miss March	Deadbeat Dad	Voice
2011	The Treasure Hunt: A Chad, Matt & Rob Interactive Adventure	The Gunslinger	
2011	Freak Dance	Mickey Stardust, Zip Fleestreet, Fraggle McWinkerbean	
2014	Hits	Donovan	
2016	Storks	Additional voice	
2017	Love After Love	Chris	
2019	The Day Shall Come	Settmonk	
2020	Have a Good Trip: Adventures in Psychedelics	Various voices	
TBA	The Adventures of Drunky	TBA	Voice

=== Television ===
Year	Title	Role	Notes
2005	Yacht Rock	Vincent Price	Episode: "Believe in It"
2005–2007	The Late Late Show with Craig Ferguson	George W. Bush	49 episodes
2006–2009	MADtv	George W. Bush	Voice, episode #12.4
2006	Mind of Mencia	George W. Bush	2 episodes
2007	Celebrity Deathmatch	Jimmy Kimmel	Voice, episode: "The Banter Bloodbath"
2007	Short Circuitz	George W. Bush	Episode #1.4
2007	Cavemen	Waiter	Episode: "Her Embarrassed of Caveman"
2007	The Right Now Show	Ensemble sketch cast member, various	Pilot
2008–2015	WordGirl	Captain Huggyface	Voice, main role
2009	Atom TV	George W. Bush	2 episodes
2009	The Jay Leno Show	Mad Doctor	Unknown episodes
2009	Popzilla	Various characters	Voice
2010	Players	Barfly	Episode: "Barb's Husband"
2010	Last Comic Standing	Himself (standup)	10 episodes
2011–2012	Conan	Various sketch characters	Unknown episodes
2012–2013	Money From Strangers	Himself	5 episodes
2012–2016	Comedy Bang! Bang!	Various	10 episodes
2012–2015	Childrens Hospital	Various	3 episodes
2012	Gravity Falls	Additional voices	Episode: "Headhunters"
2012–2014	The Eric Andre Show	Various	2 episodes
2013	The Chris Gethard Show	Jesse Ventura	Episode: "Loser Is Still the New Nerd"
2013	Adventure Time	Ogdoad	Voice, episode: "The Suitor"
2013	Maron	Brian Burkman	Episode: "Jen Moves to L.A."
2013–2015	Axe Cop	Various	Voice, 4 episodes
2013–2015	Animation Domination High-Def	Various	Voice, 3 episodes
2014	Drunk History	Alexander Cochrane	Episode: "Baltimore"
2014–2021	Talking Tom & Friends	Talking Ben, Maurice Claremont, Ronnie Bergstedt, McGillicuddy, various	Voice
2015	Kroll Show	Alan the Limo Driver	Episode: "Lizards vs. Penguins"
2015	Major Lazer	General Rubbish, various	Voice, 8 episodes
2015	The Jim Gaffigan Show	Himself	Episode: "Go Shorty, It's Your Birthday"
2015	TripTank	Brunette, Blonde	Voice, episode: "Short Change"
2015–2019	BoJack Horseman	Stuart	7 episodes
2015–2018	The Venture Bros.	Phineas Phage, Night Dick, S-464, Lawyer, Termite, Mission Creep, Sensei Finkelstein, Blackout	Voice, 8 episodes
2015–2017	Pig Goat Banana Cricket	President of the Planet, additional voices	Voice, 17 episodes
2015–2016	Regular Show	Rikki, Harry	Voice, 2 episodes
2016–2017	@midnight	Bernie Sanders	2 episodes
2016	Trump vs. Bernie: Debate for America	Bernie Sanders	TV special
2016	Trump vs. Bernie: Shout the Vote!	Bernie Sanders	TV special
2016	The UCB Show	Bernie Sanders	Episode: "Feel the Bern"
2016	Man Seeking Woman	Spider	Episode: "Balloon"
2016	Star Wars Rebels	Imperial Captain	Voice, episode: "The Forgotten Droid"
2016	Wander Over Yonder	Gluteus Maximus	Voice, episode: "The Party Poopers"
2016	Zoolander: Super Model		Voice, television film
2016	Take My Wife	Theater Owner	Episode: "Applause Break"
2016–2018	Future-Worm!	Future-Worm	Voice, main role
2016–2023	American Dad!	Various	Voice, 5 episodes
2017	The President Show	Bernie Sanders	2 episodes
2017	Bajillion Dollar Propertie$	Maximillian Blanc	Episode: "The Platinum Curse"
2017, 2019	The Special Without Brett Davis	Sebastian Gorka, Jesse Ventura	2 episodes
2018	Our Cartoon President	Bernie Sanders, Ted Cruz, Sean Hannity, Bill Clinton, various	Voice, 46 episodes
2018	Random Acts of Flyness	Everybody Dies! TV Talk Show Host	Episode: "What are your thoughts on raising free black children?"
2018, 2024	Bob's Burgers	Glenn	Voice, 2 episodes
2018, 2023	Big City Greens	Additional voices	Voice, 2 episodes
2019	Historical Roasts	Freddie Mercury	Episode: "Freddie Mercury"
2019	Rise of the Teenage Mutant Ninja Turtles	Stinkbomb, Harold	Voice, episode: "How to Make Enemies and Bend People to Your Will"
2019	Amphibia	Sheriff Buck Leatherleaf	Voice, episode: "Girl Time"
2019	DuckTales	Jones	Voice, episode: "Whatever Happened to Donald Duck?"
2019–present	Harley Quinn	Bane, Ratcatcher, Clock King, Nelvin Eckles, Snowflame, Chaz, Ian	Voice, recurring role
2020	Central Park	Jimmy	Voice, episode: "Hot Oven"
2020	Hoops		Voice, 2 episodes
2020–2022	Duncanville	Various	Voice, 19 episodes
2020–2022	Close Enough	Randy, Ezra	Voice, 24 episodes
2021	Let's Be Real	Jeff Bezos	Voice, 2 episodes
2021	Q-Force	Ennis	Voice, episode: "Backache Mountain"
2021–2022	Looney Tunes Cartoons	Rocky	Voice, 2 episodes
2021–2022	Inside Job	Various voices	4 episodes
2021–2022	Tig n' Seek	H.G. Fluffenfold	Voice, 5 episodes
2021–2023	Rugrats	Mr. Garth	Voice, 4 episodes
2021–2025	Jimmy Kimmel Live!	Various	Recurring role
2022	Cat Burglar	Rowdy	Voice, main role
2022	Teen Titans Go!	Bane	Voice, episode: "The Great Holiday Escape"
2022–2023	Human Resources	The Need Demon	Voice, 3 episodes
2022–2023	Rick and Morty		Voice, 4 episodes
2022–2024	City Island	Detritus	Voice, 20 episodes
2022–2024	Hamster & Gretel	Rodney Thunderpants, various	Voice, 3 episodes
2023	Velma	Thespian	Voice, episode: "The Candy (Wo)man"
2023	History of the World, Part II	Richard Nixon / FDR	2 episodes
2023	Strange Planet	Various	Voice, 4 episodes
2023–2025	Krapopolis	Pan, Various	Recurring voice role
2023–2026	Family Guy		Voice, 2 episodes
2024	Sausage Party: Foodtopia	Pops	Voice, episode: "Fourth Course"
2024	Kite Man: Hell Yeah!	Bane	Voice, 10 episodes
2024	The Late Show with Stephen Colbert	Elon Musk	Voice, episode: "Edward Norton"
2025	Long Story Short	Other Dad	Voice, episode: "Wolves"
2026	Strip Law		Voice, episode: "We Need to Talk About Heaven"

=== Video game ===
Year	Title	Role	Notes
2026	Invincible VS	Allen the Alien	
