= Tracey Breaks the News =

British comedy television series (2017–2018)

- Also known as: Tracey Ullman's Show
- Genre: Satire; Sketch comedy
- Written by: Tracey Ullman (devised by)
- Directed by: Dominic Brigstocke
- Starring: Tracey Ullman
- Theme music composer: Richard Thomas
- Composers: Richard Thomas; Andy Marlow
- Country of origin: United Kingdom
- Original language: English
- No. of series: 2
- No. of episodes: 7

Production
- Executive producers: Tracey Ullman; Gareth Edwards; Chris Sussman ("Pilot")
- Producer: Caroline Norris
- Editors: Nigel Williams; Joseph Haughey; Justin James ("Pilot")
- Running time: 30 minutes
- Production companies: BBC Studios; Allan McKeown Presents

Original release
- Network: BBC One
- Release: 27 October 2017 – 15 June 2018

Related
- Tracey Ullman's Show

Tracey Breaks the News is a British topical comedy programme starring Tracey Ullman. It premiered on BBC One on 27 October 2017 following a one-off special that aired on 23 June.

After the success of the one-off special, on 13 September 2017, the BBC announced that it had ordered three new episodes of Tracey Breaks the News. Like the pilot, the three new shows would tackle topical stories and current issues in a sketch show written and filmed right up to the day of broadcast. It was also reported that Ullman would impersonate the First Lady of France, Brigitte Macron, and the Leader of the Labour Party, Jeremy Corbyn.

On 15 May 2018, it was formally announced that the show had been picked up for a second series, which aired in June on BBC One.

The show has been recut and sold internationally under the Tracey Ullman's Show banner.

== Premise ==
Tracey Ullman and her cast of characters take on current events.

== Cast ==
=== Starring ===
- Tracey Ullman as Various

=== Supporting ===
- Zahra Ahmadi
- Chizzy Akudolu
- William Andrews
- Gemma Arrowsmith
- Ben Ashenden
- Anthony Atamanuik as Donald Trump
- Michael Brandon
- Jade Ewen
- Jason Forbes
- Steve Furst
- Tony Gardner
- Leila Hoffman
- Liam Hourican
- Laurence Howarth
- Martha Howe-Douglas
- Katherine Jakeways
- Dave Lamb
- Georgia Maskery
- Ben Miller as Rupert Murdoch
- Lucy Montgomery
- Dominique Moore
- Olivia Morgan
- Carlotta Morelli
- Aaron Neil
- Sue Elliott-Nicholls
- Tracy-Ann Oberman
- Laurence Rickard
- Christopher Ryan
- Dan Skinner
- Samantha Spiro
- Nico Tatarowicz
- Brona C. Titley
- Tony Way
- Ben Willbond

== Background ==
Early in her career, Ullman made a conscious decision to steer clear of "straight-up" impersonations of celebrities, believing that doing so was delving into Saturday Night Live Live territory. She instead opted for "amalgamations"—combining elements of well-known people (look, voice, mannerisms, and profession) to create original characters.

However, by the dawn of the new millennium, she felt that the world’s celebrity-driven culture required her to finally add famous figures to her repertoire, which she did with her show Tracey Ullman's State of the Union.

Critics noted a shift in the usually non-political Ullman; State of the Union took on lofty topics such as healthcare, immigration, gun culture, war, and the 24-hour news media. Her impersonations included political figures such as then—House Majority Leader Nancy Pelosi, former First Ladies Laura Bush and Carla Bruni, Congressman Barney Frank, and political pundits Arianna Huffington, Rachel Maddow, and Meghan McCain, as well as journalist Christiane Amanpour.

When the BBC approached her in 2014 about returning to the broadcaster to create a new show, Ullman was keen on exploring modern-day Britain and its "national treasures". Political figures such as German Chancellor Angela Merkel and Scottish First Minister Nicola Sturgeon were among those impersonated. She saw Britain as a global hub and a melting pot and wanted to center the show on that concept. However, by 2016, Brexit loomed as the United Kingdom voted to leave the European Union. The irony of this shift, given the show's original conception, was not lost on Ullman.

Two days before filming the second series of Tracey Ullman's Show, the Brexit vote took place, forcing the writers to perform quick rewrites for the Angela Merkel sketches. Because the show typically filmed six months ahead of transmission, the schedule proved poorly suited for topical comedy. Consequently, when the BBC ordered a post-election special for the summer of 2017, Ullman developed a new format and production schedule: the show would be written, filmed, and transmitted in quick succession to keep the material "up to the minute". As Ullman noted, "We've decided to shake it up with a more topical format because things move so fast these days—it's like every 10 minutes I'm voting for something." The show aired on 23 June.

Whilst promoting the first two series of Tracey Ullman's Show, Ullman began petitioning for the return of the British satirical puppet show Spitting Image, feeling that there was a satirical gap in British comedy. In an interview with Rolling Stone she further explained: "I mean I came [to the United States] in Reagan's era. I grew up with Spitting Image being on in England at that time, a really political satirical show with puppets. We used to have the 'President's Brain Is Missing...' for Reagan. And they tried to stop that show in America. We have always turned to satire with Private Eye and go back to Beyond the Fringe, and that's what the week was [sic]."

The special, which served as the pilot episode, proved highly successful, drawing a total of 4.2 million viewers: 2.4 million for its premiere and an additional 1.8 million during its encore showing. Unlike its predecessor, Tracey Breaks the News does not feature a laugh track.

== Production ==
=== Writing and filming ===
The series was filmed close to transmission, with ten minutes of topical material filmed just 48 hours before each episode airs. "[W]hich is as close... to Saturday Night Live as anyone in England gets at the moment," Ullman revealed to Rolling Stone magazine. "So if [Jeremy] Corbyn or Theresa May—or if something extraordinary happens—we can go in and do a piece about that."

Now we are doing a more immediate format, which is great fun. I always used to shoot shows and then they would go out six months later. But everything's so fast in the world now... I couldn't do an Angela Merkel piece or a Theresa May piece and put it out six months later. What we do now is we do three shows – which is what we are doing now - and we'll shoot for two weeks and try to do stuff that’s going to resonate for a while. Then we go in for three consecutive weeks when we write on the Friday and the Monday then we'll shoot on the Tuesday/Wednesday then on the Thursday as well if we have to, and it goes out on the Friday so it's really current. That's been so much fun – it's like doing my own little Saturday Night Live. I love it and the writers love it.
— Tracey Ullman to Claire Fordham

On 13 September 2017, the BBC formally announced that it had ordered a first series of three episodes. In a press release, it was revealed that along with Angela Merkel, Nicola Sturgeon and Theresa May, Ullman would be adding her take on the current First Lady of France Brigitte Macron and British Labour Party leader Jeremy Corbyn. "I am thrilled to be allowed to Break the News again with my fantastic team of writers and performers. It's wonderful that there is so much comedy to be found in the world's current terrifying doom spiral. These are uncertain times, but I have my money on Angela Merkel to win the German election—don’t let me down Angela, you are like my Dot in EastEnders. Theresa May—hang in there, I'm not done with you yet, and Nicola Sturgeon—all power to your elbow hen, I promise my accent will be 10% better this season. I can't wait to play new characters including First Lady of France Brigitte Macron and a certain Labour leader, who we imagine has a marvellous sense of humour and will no doubt be delighted to see himself depicted by a middle aged woman (please don't shave your beard off Jeremy, we've just had one made). Onward!"

Location filming began on 25 September. Writing and filming continued the week of transmission.

In February 2018, Ullman revealed to writer and broadcaster Claire Fordham that writing for the second series had already begun. Filming on the new series commenced on 30 April 2018. On 15 May 2018, it was confirmed that the show would return to BBC One on 1 June with a new series consisting of three episodes.

On 16 May, the BBC released a photo of Ullman in costume as British Conservative politician Michael Gove, the then-Secretary of State for Environment, Food and Rural Affairs. It was further revealed that British politician Jacob Rees-Mogg, played by actor Liam Hourican, would be added to the show's long roster of impersonations. Rees-Mogg is presented as one-half of a double act, accompanied by his "very long-suffering nanny." Also returning to the series is Ben Miller as Rupert Murdoch, playing opposite Ullman as his wife, Jerry Hall.

=== Characterisations ===
There's never been a better time to be imitating world famous political women, and I admire and thank them all: Angela Merkel, Nicola Sturgeon, and my home girl newbie Theresa May.

— Tracey Ullman

The show encompasses a wide variety of world leaders and figures portrayed by Ullman. "I don't really impersonate them, I just try to interpret them, really."

Critics found the show's take on British Prime Minister Theresa May to be both biting and sympathetic. The results of the 2017 general election left an already beleaguered May searching high and low for any sign that she was about to be ousted. Her husband, Philip (played by actor Laurence Rickard), is always on hand to lend an ear and offer emotional support while partaking in online gambling—specifically betting on how much longer his wife will remain Prime Minister.

Ullman describes May's voice as "always sounding hysterical". She further explained: "I know that English woman so well. She sort of talks like that. It's all very [as Theresa May] 'Well, let's get on, shall we?' She's a vicar's daughter from Maidenhead. And I know exactly where she's from. My sister's the same age as her. We grew up near her. And you couldn't be more different—me or Theresa May."

Ullman describes May's look as if Nosferatu and Oscar Wilde had a child. "She looks like the vicar from The Barchester Chronicles, the [Anthony] Trollope novel. She's just Dickinson looking."

Ullman admitted to being hesitant playing May right after the election and Grenfell Tower fire, feeling that it was the last thing she (May) needed. “I thought, can I do this? There's suddenly so much suffering this woman can go through and then Tracey Ullman impersonates her in primetime. It's like, leave her alone, you know? But then we did it and it was just fabulous fun and the nation needed it."

Ullman's Angela Merkel has moved on from her crush on former United States President Barack Obama and has now set her sights on new world leaders such as Canadian Prime Minister Justin Trudeau and French President Emmanuel Macron (played by Ben Willbond), who she Skypes multiple times a day. "[A]nd his eye for the mature sex machine is of no relevance, Birgit, nein.” The one leader Angela does not relish conferencing with is United States President Donald Trump, or Herr Trump, as she refers to him. "He hates me, and I hate him more!"

Ullman was thrilled to cast actor Anthony Atamanuik as Donald Trump for the show. "I saw him during the election, and I just thought that he was the best Trump. I mean, Alec Baldwin is amazing, but I love Anthony's take... We wanted to have Angela Merkel and Theresa May interacting with Trump, and Anthony is always in character as Trump, so it’s perfect," she noted. "He's been fantastic with what we've done so far. I'm going to have all sorts of people talking with him." In contrast to the grounded political figures, his wife, First Lady Melania Trump, is portrayed as a Westworld robot created by the Russian government; she continuously malfunctions and must be flown back to Russia for repairs.

Nicola Sturgeon, depicted as a Bond-style villain alongside her henchman Mhairi Black (referred to as "Wee Mhairi"), continues her quest for Scottish independence at any cost. Both the real Nicola Sturgeon and Mhairi Black have voiced support for their portrayals in the show—as have Sturgeon's political rivals. While the show pokes fun at Sturgeon's repeated calls for referendums, Ullman has stated that she admires her. Nevertheless, the depictions did draw the ire of several online SNP supporters.

The show lampoons the entire political spectrum. Ullman, a lifelong Labour supporter, has been openly critical of the party in recent years, describing herself as feeling "party-less."[27] The show's 2017 post-election pilot episode features a sketch in which a newly elected Labour MP is sent to a "voluntary mandatory re-education program" at Labour headquarters. There, the MP is brainwashed into believing that then-Labour leader Jeremy Corbyn (portrayed by Ullman in series one) has "defeated Toryism" and that the number of seats won by the party is larger than it appears. The ultimate torture technique featured in the sketch: sending in Shadow Chancellor John McDonnell (Laurence Howarth).

Corbyn is portrayed as a politician keen on giving the impression that he understands the plight of "the worker" while simultaneously reveling in his newfound celebrity. McDonnell is depicted as increasingly resentful of Corbyn for making decisions without consultation, fearing what his colleague is becoming.

A sketch in the Series 2 premiere (broadcast on 1 June 2018) drew considerable ire from Labour Party members on social media. Featuring Ullman as then-Labour leader Jeremy Corbyn, the segment referenced his ties to Gerry Adams (former leader of Sinn Féin) and Hamas, and focused on the public debate surrounding antisemitism in the Labour Party. In response, conspiracy theories and erroneous claims surfaced on Twitter from Labour supporters alleging that Jewish comedian David Baddiel had written the sketch, that Ullman herself was Jewish, and that the segment was part of a "Zionist conspiracy" against the party.

Public figures such as George Galloway were instrumental in amplifying these claims. Baddiel—an outspoken atheist who is not a Zionist and had no involvement with the show—responded on Twitter: "Been told, hilariously, that Corbynistas... have assumed that I wrote Tracey Ullman's JC sketch on her show: a brilliant example of how they truly eschew the idea of a Jewish conspiracy." Baddiel later followed up: "This is literally the weirdest conspiracy theory I've ever seen. I've now seen it stated as fact that I wrote that sketch. Maybe I should ask for royalties. Or will that confirm the stereotype for the antisemites?"

Ullman, who is not Jewish, is a long-time Labour supporter, as is Baddiel. Producer Caroline Norris clarified: "I have no idea where [this idea] came from. He'd be on the credits if he'd written a sketch for the show." In reality, the sketch was written by Laurence Howarth, who also penned a series of sketches for the second series mocking Conservative MP Jacob Rees-Mogg. Figures such as Dan Schneider, Al Murray, Emma Kennedy, and Tracy-Ann Oberman came to the show's defense, condemning the antisemitic smears launched against Ullman, Baddiel, and the production itself. Shane Allen, the BBC’s Head of Comedy Commissioning, defended the sketches, stating that "attacking the left, right and centre is part of the whole point of satire". He added that writers should not fear Twitter controversy, calling the platform "a playground for bullies, arseholes and cowards".

== Episodes ==
Series	Episodes	Originally released	
Series	Episodes	First released	Last released
Special		23 June 2017	
1	3	27 October 2017	10 November 2017
2	3	1 June 2018	15 June 2018

=== Special (2017) ===
No.	Title	Directed by	Written by	Original release date	U.K. viewers (millions)
1	"Pilot"	Dominic Brigstocke	Gemma Arrowsmith, Kevin Cecil, Andy Riley, Jeremy Dyson, Laurence Howarth, Katherine Jakeways, Georgia Pritchett	23 June 2017	2.4
A post-election, one year anniversary of Brexit comedy special.

=== Series 1 (2017) ===
An unaired sketch was released exclusively online by BBC Comedy on 1 November 2017 with the caption "So THAT's how they name hurricanes..."

No. overall	No. in series	Title	Directed by	Written by	Original release date	U.K. viewers (millions)
2	1	"Episode 1"	Dominic Brigstocke	Kevin Cecil, Andy Riley, Jeremy Dyson, Laurence Howarth, Giles Pilbrow, Georgia Pritchett, Laurence Rickard, Brona C. Titley, Tony Cooke, Tracey Ullman	27 October 2017	2.38
Theresa has figured out a way to make the universal credit helpline free - she'll be taking the calls herself. Brexit negotiations - does Europe wish to keep anything British? Why viewers watch The Great British Bake Off. Reporting on President of the United States Donald Trump. John McDonnell sees a change in Jeremy Corbyn. Oxbridge admissions committee are seeking diversity. Hollywood studio heads meet to discuss new code of conduct in the wake of Harvey Weinstein. Reporting on Robert Mugabe - for goodwill ambassador? Theresa readies for a Halloween party. Appealing the licence termination in London for Uber. The Macrons take a trip down memory lane. Reporting on Catalonia threatening to leave Spain - "Do you reckon he'll go through with it?" Nicola and Mhairi begin brainstorming how to get Britain interested in Scotland again after the DUP stole the SNP's thunder. Camilla Parker Bowles goes shopping for her new "grand-sprog". Reporting on something about China. Liberal Democrats headquarters brainstorm how to turn Leader of the Liberal Democrats Vince Cable into the President of France Emmanuel Macron. Alexis Teenage Edition. Angela works on her poker face.
3	2	"Episode 2"	Dominic Brigstocke	Gemma Arrowsmith, Kevin Cecil, Andy Riley, Jeremy Dyson, Laurence Howarth, Giles Pilbrow, Georgia Pritchett, Laurence Rickard, Brona C. Titley, Tony Cooke	3 November 2017	2.38
Jeremy and John watch "Tracey Breaks the News" on Gogglebox. Theresa organises the Conservative Christmas party. Dame Judi Dench discusses her latest film. The Kremlin devises a new plan of attack on Western democracy. Reporting on further allegations on sexual misconduct. John doesn't agree with Jeremy's new celebrity-style politics. Angela meets with Emmanuel Macron. Reporting on the indictment of Paul Manafort. An app brainstorming session. Camilla pops over to the chemist. Sexual harassment claims advert. Reporting on Gemma Collins. App brainstorming continues. Jeremy and John watch The Apprentice. Claire Balding discusses presenting the 2018 Winter Olympics. Reporting on Gordon Brown's memoir. The Liberal Democrats try to persuade Tim Farron to do a reality television show. Nicola's plan to turn golfers off of using Donald Trump's golf courses in Scotland. Reporting on Prue Leith leaking the winner of The Great British Bake Off. Alexis Long Term Relationship Edition. A twist on university debt. Nicola's plan fails. Jeremy and John watch Question Time.
4	3	"Episode 3"	Dominic Brigstocke	Gemma Arrowsmith, Kevin Cecil, Andy Riley, Jeremy Dyson, Lawrence Howarth, Giles Pilbrow, Georgia Pritchett, Laurence Rickard	10 November 2017	2.35
Theresa returns from her "cross party sleaze meeting". Sharon Osbourne tries to understand the new X Factor rules. Angela feels jaded after topping Forbes' World's 100 Most Powerful Women list. Reporting on Priti Patel's resignation. A very unprepared, unqualified Gavin Williamson Secretary of State for Defence. Camilla is pulled over for erratic driving. New from MP Games: Guess Who's Next? The first day for a new hire at HM Revenue and Customs. Reporting on Lewis Hamilton's alleged tax avoidance. Theresa Skypes with Donald Trump. Alexis Senior Edition. The Chair of Public Works begins detonating potentially offensive statues in London. Reporting on copied and pasted articles from BuzzFeed. Nicola already has an operation going to protect Scotland when the "Brexshit" hits the fan. The Some Sort of Therapy Centre. John attempts to prep Jeremy for Prime Minister's Questions. An editorial meeting. Reporting on the Paradise Papers and Her Majesty's investments. The Chair of Public Works deems Eros as potentially offensive. Debate over female led television drama.

=== Series 2 (2018) ===
No. overall	No. in series	Title	Directed by	Written by	Original release date	U.K. viewers (millions)
5	1	"Episode 1"	Dominic Brigstocke	Simon Alcock, Kevin Cecil, Andy Riley, Laurence Howarth, Giles Pilbrow, Georgia Pritchett, Laurence Rickard, Brona C. Titley, Tony Cooke	1 June 2018	TBA
A secure location? Angela worries about her image. The future of the Star Wars franchise. A woman applies to become Jacob Rees-Mogg's new housekeeper (or nanny). Reporting on Roseanne Barr's controversial tweets. A woman tries to explain the Me Too movement to her male office co-workers with little success. Donald Trump ships himself to England. Reporting on Jamie Oliver's lobbying to get Parliament to ban cartoon characters on cereal packaging. Nicola reveals her plan to use plastic to expand Scotland to Mhairi. Donald Trump, boxed up, hits the road. Nursing in 2018. Reporting on a heroic undocumented migrant who was granted French citizenship. Camilla hosts an Airbnb couple breakfast. Jeremy Corbyn has an awkward reunion with an old friend. Reporting on Raheem Sterling's machine gun tattoo. Paddy Passports. Russian government officials attempt to rig the World Cup. Reporting on WHSmith being voted "Worst Shop." Michael Gove takes part in a trust exercise.
6	2	"Episode 2"	Dominic Brigstocke	Simon Alcock, Gemma Arrowsmith, Kevin Cecil & Andy Riley, Laurence Howarth, Will Maclean, Lucy Montgomery, Giles Pilbrow, Laurence Rickard, Brona C. Titley & Tony Cooke	8 June 2018	TBA
Theresa learns that some people are saying that she should be replaced by Michael Gove. Fortnite Battle Brexit. A couple decides to hire Michael Gove as their babysitter. Reporting on H&M changing its UK women's wear sizes. Jeremy tries to sell tickets to Labour Live. A meeting to fix the problem with train timetables. Love Northern Ireland. Rupert Murdoch returns home from a meeting at Disney. Reporting on the government's approval for a third runway at Heathrow Airport and Boris Johnson stating he will lie down in front of bulldozers. A glamour model-turn dolly bird agent reveals the push back against the dolly bird industry. Theresa prepares for the G7 summit. Reporting on Qatar Airways CEO's sexist remark. The Russians fly to Washington, D.C. to repair the Melania Bot. Rupert discovers Jerry filling out a carer's allowance application form. The Overly-Woke Support Group. Angela wonders if she's being paid as much as her male political counterparts. Reporting on Donald Trump and Kim Jong Un meeting on Sentosa Island. Kirstie Allsopp aims to relocate a couple from Parliament. Jacob Rees-Mogg takes a meeting in a restaurant, along with some help from Nanny.
7	3	"Episode 3"	Dominic Brigstocke	Gemma Arrowsmith, Kevin Cecil & Andy Riley, Mike Hayley, Liam Hourican, Laurence Howarth, Lucy Montgomery, Giles Pilbrow, Georgia Pritchett, Laurence Rickard, Brona C. Titley & Tony Cooke	15 June 2018	2.17
Theresa's Brexit Fudge. Michael Gove helps an elderly woman cross the road. Jeremy prepares for Labour Live. Welcoming (and warning) foreigners to Russia for 2018 World Cup. Jerry and the kids surprise Rupert for Father's Day. Reporting on a raccoon who scaled a building. Britain's Last Shopper. Granny Camilla takes the royal sprogs to a play center. Coming soon to BBC One, Britain's Favourite Fatberg with Julie Walters. An Amazon representative confronts Gareth Southgate. Reporting on Mark Carne's CBE. It's bathtime for Jacob Rees-Mogg. A couple's smart home starts malfunctioning. Britain's Favourite Rail Replacement Bus Service with Julie Waters. Nicola still hasn't gotten over Scotland losing the curling competition at the Winter Olympics. Reporting on the Donald Trump and Kim Jung Un's treaty. A hipster infestation. Dame Judi Dench teaches Mark Rylance how to be a national treasure. Donations for Feminists Who Ruin Things Men Used to Like. Theresa is convinced she's living in her own version of The Truman Show.

== Reception ==
The show has been met with positive reviews.

=== Awards and nominations ===
Year	Award	Category	Recipient(s)/Nominee(s)	Result	Ref(s)
2018	Royal Television Society Awards	Make Up Design – Entertainment & Non Drama	Vanessa White, Floris Schuller & Neill Gorton	Nominated	

== International distribution ==
On 30 August 2018, HBO announced it would begin airing a "third season" of Ullman's series on 28 September 2018. While marketed as a new season of Tracey Ullman's Show in the United States, the network actually utilized episodes and material produced for the more topical Tracey Breaks the News.

The season made its international premiere at the 2018 Tribeca TV Festival on 21 September 2018. The event featured a screening followed by a Q&A session with Ullman, hosted by actress Meryl Streep.

Outside of the United States, the show's international distributor, the UK-based DRG, followed HBO's lead by selling the more topical Tracey Breaks the News episodes under the more established title Tracey Ullman's Show.
