= Trump vs. Bernie =

American satirical comedy act

Trump vs. Bernie is a satirical comedy act created by Anthony Atamanuik and James Adomian that imagines a series of fictional presidential debates between Donald Trump and Bernie Sanders during the 2016 presidential election. In a deliberately absurd anachronism, "Trump" (Atamanuik) and "Bernie" (Adomian) engage in inter-party debates long before their parties' nominations are decided. Originating in October 2015 as a live sketch at the Upright Citizens Brigade Theatre (UCB) in New York, Trump vs. Bernie continued throughout the 2016 election season as a 40-city live comedy debate tour, and spawned a special one-hour appearance on Comedy Central's @midnight, two hour-long specials produced for Fusion, and a comedy album released by Comedy Dynamics, along with numerous appearances on news and comedy programs, radio shows, and podcasts.

== Background ==
Adomian began impersonating Sanders in May 2015, making an appearance on Dan Harmon's podcast Harmontown and in a Funny or Die short with a television debut on a September episode of @midnight. Atamanuik performed as Trump at various improv shows starting in August 2015, resulting in a one-man show at UCB New York entitled "Trump Dump." The duo, having known each other from the improv scene since 2008, connected to stage a fake debate in a one-off live sketch on October 12, 2015, at UCB's stand-up showcase "Whiplash." An edited video of the performance uploaded to YouTube was well-received by websites like Salon and Daily Dot, which lead to a subsequent show at the New York Comedy Festival, where the "debate" was moderated by The Daily Show correspondent Hasan Minhaj.

== Trump vs. Bernie Debate Tour 2016 ==
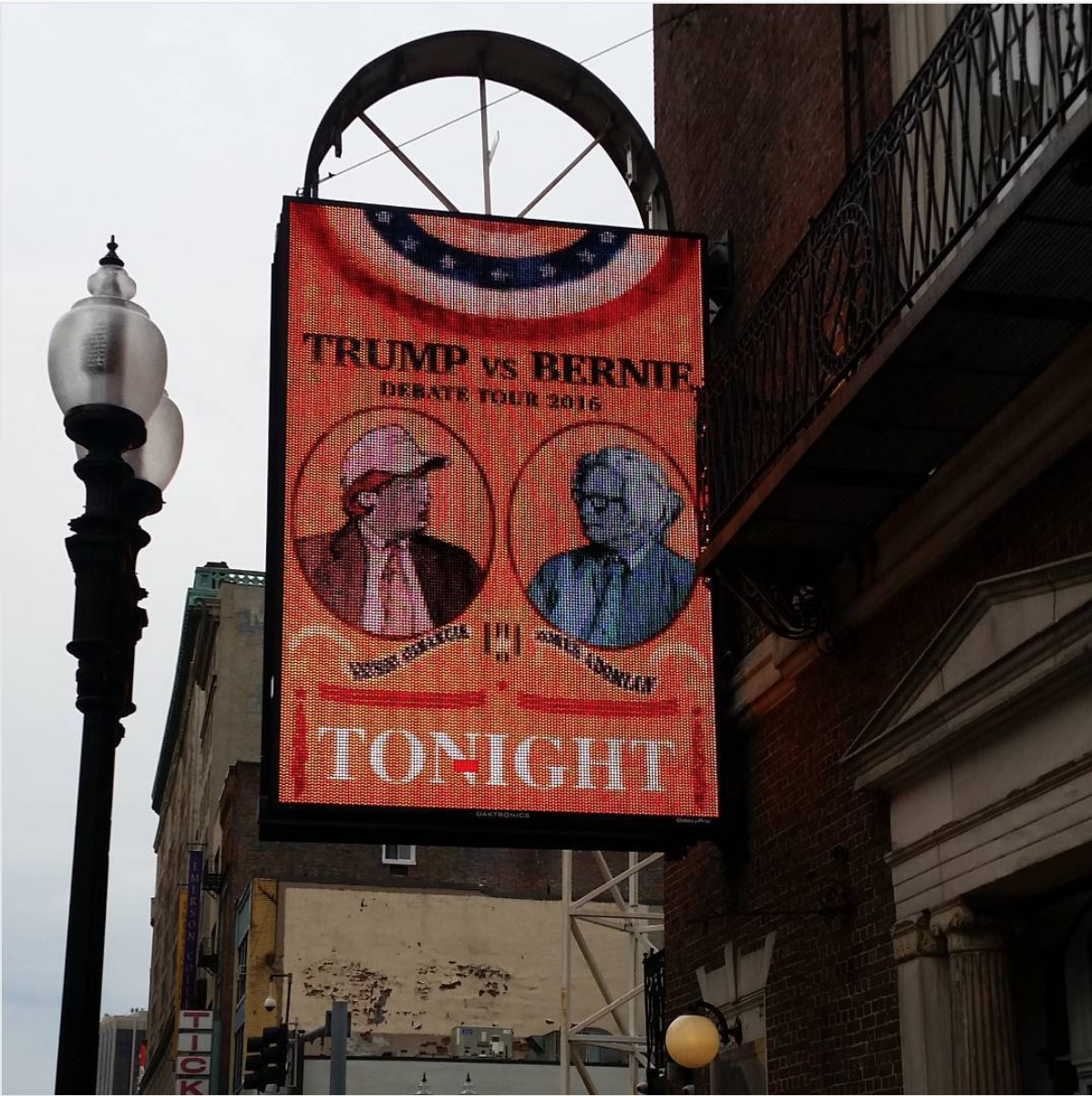
Trump vs. Bernie marquee in Boston Adomian and Atamanuik at the 2016 JFL Festival in Montreal.

In January 2016, dates for an initial 12-city US debate tour were announced. Debates were held in Portsmouth and Manchester a day before the New Hampshire presidential primaries that both the real Trump and Sanders won. The tour grew to a total of 40 cities and had an international leg in Amsterdam, Dublin, London, and Montreal. Each debate was moderated by a celebrity guest such as Baratunde Thurston, Andy Richter and Mark Hamill. The tour concluded at the Just for Laughs Festival in Montreal where Atamanuik and Adomian were honored as two of Variety magazine's 10 Comics to Watch for 2016.

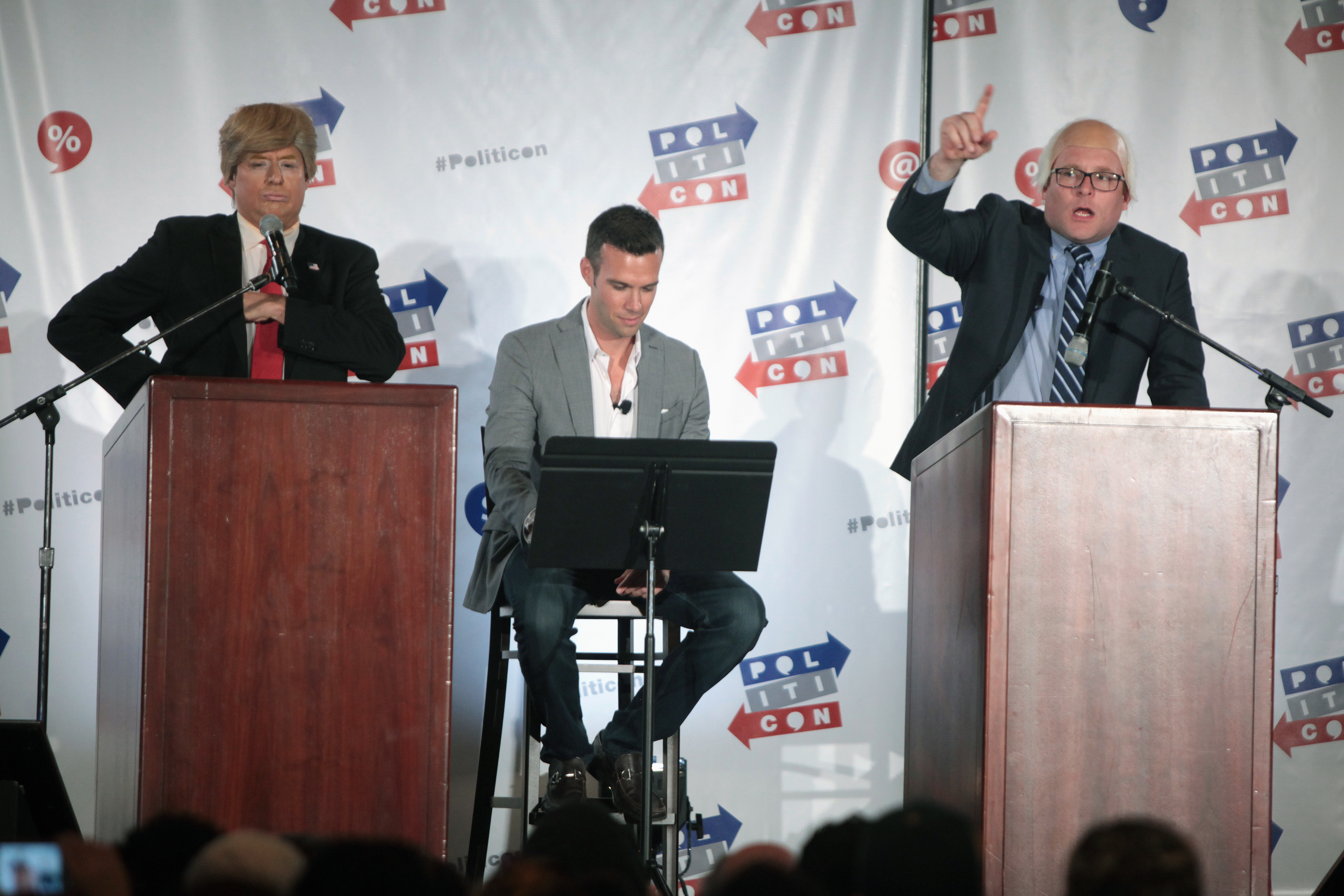
Jon Favreau moderates a mock "Trump vs. Bernie" debate with Anthony Atamanuik as Donald Trump and James Adomian as Bernie Sanders.

== @midnight guest appearance ==
On March 23, 2016, @midnight deviated from its usual three-person panel game format to host an hour-long Trump vs. Bernie debate moderated by host Chris Hardwick. According to Hardwick, a Comedy Central executive present at the taping decided to preempt originally scheduled programming to extend the 30 minute show to an hour because he was so impressed. Billed as "socialist vs. sociopath," the episode was subsequently posted to YouTube and has amassed over 7 million views.

== Fusion television specials ==
On Super Tuesday, the Fusion network ordered an hour-long debate special and hour-long sketch show special based on the act along with digital content that began with a livestream on Fusion's F-Comedy Facebook page later that night.

=== Trump vs. Bernie: Debate for America (2016) ===
The debate special aired April 27, 2016. It is moderated by Paul F. Tompkins, Brianna Baker, and River Butcher. Betsy Sodaro plays a protester who heckles Trump throughout the debate. When Sodaro storms the stage, Trump brandishes a gun and shoots her. The special ends with Bernie rushing to Sodaro and tackling Trump.

=== Trump vs. Bernie: Shout the Vote! (2016) ===
Trump vs. Bernie: Shout the Vote! aired later the next month on May 11, 2016. Presented as "Loudbox," a cable news program hosted by Rachel Maddow (Atamanuik) and Chris Matthews (Adomian) with panelists Donna Brazile (Nicole Byer), Jeb Bush (Daniel Van Kirk), and Ben Carson (Jerry Minor), the pundits ignore an impending cataclysmic asteroid strike in favor of political optics while throwing to interviews and field pieces with Trump and Bernie. Atamanuik also impersonates alleged serial killer Robert Durst while Adomian plays former Governor of Minnesota Jesse Ventura.

== Live from Brooklyn (comedy album) ==
Comedy Dynamics released Trump vs. Bernie: Live from Brooklyn Starring Anthony Atamanuik and James Adomian on July 29, 2016, on vinyl as well as on iTunes and other streaming services. The album featured a tour debate moderated by the Huffington Post's Howard Fineman. It debuted at #5 on Billboard's Comedy Album charts.

| Track | Title | Duration |
|---|---|---|
| 1 | Debate Moderator: Howard Fineman | 5:32 |
| 2 | Opening Statement: Donald Trump | 3:22 |
| 3 | Opening Statement: Bernie Sanders | 2:53 |
| 4 | Election Strategy | 5:55 |
| 5 | Race in America | 4:40 |
| 6 | Climate Change (Sample) | 5:00 |
| 7 | Economic Issues | 6:31 |
| 8 | Planned Parenthood | 3:56 |
| 9 | Social Issues | 5:27 |
| 10 | Personal Beliefs | 4:01 |
| 11 | Immigration Reform | 4:38 |
| 12 | Media and Democracy | 4:02 |
| 13 | Random Statements | 1:07 |
| 14 | Gun Control | 4:05 |
| 15 | Foreign Policy | 4:37 |
| 16 | First 100 Days: Donald Trump | 4:12 |
| 17 | First 100 Days: Bernie Sanders | 5:51 |
| 18 | Good Night and Fuck You | 0:55 |

== Other media appearances ==
Atamanuik and Adomian promoted the debate tour in character on an episode of Comedy Bang! Bang! that also features Gilbert Gottfried. On February 12, 2016, a week after the New Hampshire primary, CNN's Brooke Baldwin interviewed Atamanuik and Adomian on Newsroom as if they were the real life candidates. The duo has appeared on The Howard Stern Show twice: first in June 2016 and again after the election of Donald Trump.

== Reception ==
Both Atamanuik and Adomian have received praise for their portrayals. Critic for The New York Times Jason Zinoman said of their initial debate, "The best sketch about the current political campaign that I've seen this year was not on 'Saturday Night Live.'" Dan Caffrey of The A.V. Club credits Atamanuik with taking a "psychological approach" with "moments of self-awareness" that allows him explore the emptiness of Trump's soul. Both Salon and Huffington Post called Adomian's Sanders better than Larry David's, which Jené Gutierrez of the Daily Dot attributed to his ability to not only capture the essence of Sanders, but to bolster it with improvisation that "communicates complex issues in an accessible way" and transforms it into "smart and subtly flattering comedy." Comedian Patton Oswalt agreed saying, "[James Adomian] and [Anthony Atamanuik] are the scary best at everything. Actor Mark Hamill said of the routine, "Beyond hilarious! On a scale of 1-10, it's an 11! TREMENDOUS Trump. BRILLIANT Bernie."

== Aftermath ==
After the election of Donald Trump, Comedy Central premiered The President Show on April 27, 2017, as a weekly late-night show starring Atamanuik. Adomian reprised his role as Bernie on an episode of the show as well as on its one-hour special "I Came Up With Christmas."
