= Pilot (Tracey Breaks the News) =

- Tracey Breaks the News episode
- Episode no.: Episode 1
- Directed by: Dominic Brigstocke
- Written by: Tracey Ullman (devised by); Gemma Arrowsmith; Kevin Cecil; Andy Riley; Jeremy Dyson; Laurence Howarth; Katherine Jakeways; Georgia Pritchett
- Editing by: Justin James
- Original air date: 23 June 2017
- Running time: 30 minutes

"Pilot" is the pilot episode of the British comedy series Tracey Breaks the News, starring Tracey Ullman. The series was commissioned by the BBC for BBC One. It was thematically inspired by the aftermath of the 2017 United Kingdom general election, as well as the one-year anniversary of the Brexit referendum, and was recorded and aired shortly thereafter. The broadcast is a reformatted version of Tracey Ullman's Show.

Tracey Breaks the News is the second television special Ullman has produced for British television, her first since 1993's Tracey Ullman: A Class Act, and her fifth overall. The episode aired on 23 June 2017. The success of the pilot led to a full series commission of Tracey Breaks the News.

== Premise ==
The episode features a series of topical, satirical sketches following the aftermath of the 2017 UK general election and ongoing Brexit developments.

The program opens with Prime Minister Theresa May practicing a speech in front of her husband, Philip, while later sketches depict her dealing with the stress of the recent election results and being awoken by a late-night phone call from Arlene Foster making further DUP demands. Meanwhile, German Chancellor Angela Merkel Skypes with Donald Trump, and Russian intelligence technicians attempt to fix a malfunctioning Melania Bot before flying her back to Russia for maintenance.

Other sketches include a training session schooling Eastern European workers on how to behave like British builders post-Brexit, an analysis of whether the BBC's coverage of Jeremy Corbyn is biased, and a look at a "voluntary mandatory re-education program" at Labour Party headquarters. Additional segments follow a man attempting to rent out his battle bus, an evaluation of polling agencies, a support group titled "Not Everyone Thinks Exactly the Same As You Do", and a confrontation between Nicola Sturgeon and her political rival Ruth Davidson on a golf course. The episode also features satirical takes on modern life, including a police constable discussing a bystander filming an abusive incident in portrait mode, a couple viewing an apartment they have no intention of moving into, a woman experiencing severe voting fatigue, a look inside a heavily downsized Liberal Democrats headquarters, and Tracey confronting a Twitter troll.

== Cast ==
- Tracey Ullman as Various
- Chizzy Akudolu as Various
- Gemma Arrowsmith as Various
- Jake Bailey
- Rhona Cameron as Ruth Davidson
- Dominique Moore as Various
- Jade Ewen
- Tony Gardner as Various
- William Hartley
- Laurence Howarth as Various
- Katherine Jakeways as Various
- Georgia Maskery as Various
- Mabel McKeown as Herself
- Olivia Morgan as Various
- Carlotta Morelli as Melania Trump
- Aaron Neil as Various
- Sue Elliott-Nicholls as Various
- Laurence Rickard as Philip May
- Dan Skinner as Various
- Samantha Spiro as Birgit
- Tony Way as Various
- Anthony Atamanuik as Donald Trump

== Background ==
After thirty years working primarily in the United States, British comedian Tracey Ullman returned to the BBC with the sketch comedy series Tracey Ullman's Show. The series features Ullman performing an eclectic cast of characters, ranging from original creations to real-life figures. The program's political and celebrity impersonations—notably her takes on a devious Judi Dench, a vain Angela Merkel, and Nicola Sturgeon reimagined as a Bond-style villain—were widely lauded by television critics.

While promoting the first two series of Tracey Ullman's Show in the United Kingdom, Ullman repeatedly called for the return of the award-winning satirical puppet show Spitting Image, arguing that contemporary television desperately needed a strong satirical voice. Commenting on her own history with the program, she noted, "I think they did a Spitting Image puppet of me once. I didn't think it was that great. She only made one appearance!" Later, while promoting the show in the United States, Ullman expressed interest in developing an impression of Melania Trump, telling People magazine: "I'll let Alec Baldwin do [Trump]. It's not like I'm going to try that one now. No! I'd like to do Melania when things have calmed down a little [...] I think I can do it because she’s from countries that I know. I think I can do it, I think I try."

Theresa May: "What's that?"
Philip: Oh, just a little something to help you. It's a CD to teach you how to talk to humans. You just listen to the phrases, and then repeat what they say.
CD: "How are you?"
Theresa May: "Strong and stable."
Philip: "No – repeat what it says."

— Dialogue snippet from the episode's opening Theresa May sketch

Two days before filming began on the second series of Tracey Ullman's Show, the UK voted to leave the European Union. This forced the production's writing team to conduct sudden, last-minute rewrites for many of the series' planned Angela Merkel sketches. Ullman did not have time to prepare an impersonation of newly appointed Prime Minister Theresa May at the time because David Cameron was still in office when writing concluded, though May was referenced off-screen by Merkel in the second series finale. Ullman later stated during an appearance on The One Show that if the network ordered a third series, she would fully commit to debuting a Theresa May character.

On 26 May 2017, the BBC officially announced a new topical half-hour special titled Tracey Breaks the News for BBC One. Conceived to air quickly in the wake of the 2017 United Kingdom general election, the special featured Ullman's first depictions of both Theresa May and Melania Trump alongside her returning caricatures of Merkel and Sturgeon. Similar to her previous series, the format blended prominent public figures with everyday people processing the election results and the anniversary of the Brexit referendum, capturing perspectives from the UK, continental Europe, and Russia. Ullman expressed her enthusiasm for the project, stating, "We've decided to shake it up with a more topical format because things move so fast these days it's like every 10 minutes I'm voting for something. There's never been a better time to be imitating world famous political women, and I admire and thank them all: Angela Merkel, Nicola Sturgeon, and my home girl newbie Theresa May. I can't wait to get stuck in."

== Reception ==
The pilot episode of Tracey Breaks the News debuted to 2.4 million viewers on its initial broadcast, gaining an additional 1.8 million viewers during its repeat broadcast to bring the consolidated total to 4.2 million.
