= Tracey Ullman Show =

Tracey Ullman Show may refer to:

- For the American 1980s series The Tracey Ullman Show
- For the British 2016 series Tracey Ullman's Show
