= Murder in Successville =

British television series

- Genre: Comedy
- Created by: Andy Brereton; Avril Spary
- Directed by: James de Frond
- Starring: Tom Davis
- Country of origin: United Kingdom
- Original language: English
- No. of series: 3
- No. of episodes: 18

Production
- Producers: Andy Brereton; Ed Sleeman
- Running time: 30 minutes (approx)
- Production company: Tiger Aspect Productions

Original release
- Network: BBC Three
- Release: 6 May 2015 – 24 May 2017

Murder in Successville is a British sitcom with improvisational elements created by Andy Brereton and Avril Spary. The series aired on BBC Three from 6 May 2015 to 24 May 2017. Murder in Successville stars Tom Davis as DI Desmond Sleet who is partnered with a guest celebrity every episode to solve a murder. The cast of every episode includes impersonations of various celebrities who live in the fictional Successville.

Celebrities are transposed into fictional versions that fit into the setting of Successville, such as Alan Carr who in Successville's universe is a mobster and brother to Jimmy Carr. Liam Hourican appears as Police Chief Gordon Ramsay in each episode, introducing the guest celebrity at the start and revealing whether they have picked the correct killer at each episode's conclusion.

== Cast ==
Celebrities who have participated include Jamie Laing, Greg James, Deborah Meaden, Dermot O'Leary, Chris Kamara, Richard Osman and Martin Kemp.

All episodes are set in the modern day, except the series 3 episode with Martin Kemp, who travelled back in time to the first murder in Successville.

Actor	Role(s)
Tom Davis	DI Sleet
Liam Hourican	Gordon Ramsay, Simon Cowell
Luke Kempner	Alan Carr, Brian Cox, Andy Murray, Russell Brand, Daniel Radcliffe, Tom Daley, Jeremy Kyle, Arsène Wenger, Bear Grylls, Declan Donnelly
Cariad Lloyd	Darcey Bussell, Justin Bieber, Cheryl, Miley Cyrus, Angela Merkel, Claudia Winkleman, Hillary Clinton, Alex Jones
Colin Hoult	Gary Barlow, Jimmy Carr, Ian McKellen, David Tennant, Tony Blair, Adrian Chiles, Piers Morgan, Ant McPartlin
Jenny Bede	Jessie J, Nicki Minaj, Taylor Swift
Tony Way	Harry Styles, Paul Hollywood, Jamie Oliver
Rachel Parris	Lady Gaga, Sarah Millican, Tess Daly
Marie Lawrence	Lana Del Rey, Kim Kardashian, Lorraine Kelly, Paloma Faith, Sharon Osbourne, Helen - DI Sleet’s Sister in Law
Jason Lewis	Barack Obama, Jay Z, Kanye West
Harry Peacock	Niall Horan
Frances Barber	Mary Berry
Nick Mohammed	Dynamo
Marek Larwood	Boris Johnson
Ricky Grover	Lord Alan Sugar
Tom Stourton	Vladimir Putin, Neil - DI Sleet's brother
Joseph Morpurgo	Shia LaBeouf
Yasmine Akram	Nigella Lawson
Justin Edwards	Jeremy Clarkson
Paul Kaye	Louis Walsh
Kerry Howard	Katy Perry, Madonna
Ellie White	Cara Delevingne, Björk
Neil Maskell	Frankie Boyle
Doc Brown	Lewis Hamilton
Paul Whitehouse	Len Goodman
Kevin Bishop	John Bishop
Jess Robinson	Lily Allen
Tom Meeten	Richard Hammond
Dan Renton Skinner	Bob Geldof
Gemma Whelan	Adele
Nico Tatarowicz	Sid Lowecroft
Jamie Demetriou	Zayn Malik
Tom Bennett	Conor McGregor, Michael McIntyre
Terry Mynott	Bill Nighy, Jonathan Ross, David Walliams
Perry Fitzpatrick	Phil Neville
Samson Kayo	will.i.am
Leo Armstrong	Darren Lowecroft
Tim Grewcock	Cult leader
Nick Oram	Cult leader
Jessica Kennedy	Venus Williams
Dominique Moore	Serena Williams
Lydia Fraser	Beyoncé

== Episodes ==
=== Series overview ===
Series	Episodes	Originally released	
Series	Episodes	First released	Last released
1	6	6 May 2015	10 June 2015
2	6	15 June 2016	20 July 2016
3	6	19 April 2017	24 May 2017

=== Series 1 (2015) ===
No. overall	No. in series	Title	Guest star	Original release date
1	1	"The Mob"	Jamie Laing	6 May 2015
When Bruno Tonioli is murdered, DI Sleet and new recruit Jamie Laing must interview Tonioli's ex-wife Darcey Bussell and explore the underworld of Successville's mobs headed by the Carr twins (Jimmy and Alan), and their rivals Harry Styles and his One Direction gang.
2	2	"Bunch of Cults"	Greg James	13 May 2015
When Reese Witherspoon is found murdered, Greg James teams up with DI Sleet to uncover the culprit. Reverend Gary Barlow, Brian Cox, Justin Bieber and Mary Berry are all suspects in the case.
3	3	"Dead, Rich and Famous"	Deborah Meaden	20 May 2015
A call to Lady Gaga's mansion over a case of topiary vandalism soon leads to the discovery of a murder and its time for new recruit Deborah Meaden to partner with DI Sleet and discover whether Cheryl, Jay-Z, Boris Johnson or Nicki Minaj is responsible.
4	4	"Mayor the Force Be with You"	Dermot O'Leary	27 May 2015
The murder of Amanda Holden leads DI Sleet and Dermot O'Leary to discover that Mayor Simon Cowell has been kidnapped. Miley Cyrus, Jessie J and Alan Sugar are all suspects and its up to O'Leary to find the culprit.
5	5	"Dr Death"	Kimberly Wyatt	3 June 2015
DI Sleet tries to track down a killer at Successville Hospital with the help of guest star Kimberly Wyatt. This week's murder suspects include nurse Adele, doctor Barack Obama and surgeons Bob Geldof and Andy Murray.
6	6	"Orangefinger"	Louis Smith	10 June 2015
The detectives learn that pharmacist Lindsay Lohan has been spray-tanned to death, before tonight's beauty pageant organized by businessman Russell Brand, a pageant in which Sleet and gym owner Vladimir Putin are judges, and psychopathic killer Kim Kardashian is a contestant. Forensic pathologist Richard Hammond shows them the body and journalist Lily Allen is murdered during the case.

=== Series 2 (2016) ===
No. overall	No. in series	Title	Guest star	Original release date
7	1	"Vigilante"	Vicky Pattison	15 June 2016
On his birthday, Sleet's arrested for the murder of Nick Knowles when the body is discovered in the detective's car. Rookie cop Vicky Pattison breaks him out and together they hunt the real killer. Interrogating politician Len Goodman, breaking into Sleet's former lover's apartment (Lorraine Kelly) and questioning Sleet's rival Lewis Hamilton.
8	2	"Miranda"	Mark Wright	22 June 2016
DI Sleet and Mark Wright visit Daniel Radcliffe to find out who is dealing a new drug, nicknamed 'Miranda'. Radcliffe is killed so they start their investigation by going undercover to interrogate biker gang leader Paul Hollywood at a bar. Mark heads to Successville's most notorious drug lord Frankie Boyle's house to interrogate him, before finally heading into Scumville to question low-life druggies Tess Daly and Claudia Winkleman.
9	3	"A Horse Called Alan"	Chris Kamara	29 June 2016
DI Sleet and Chris Kamara discover that Sleet's close friend, Successville's most successful race horse, Alan Shearer has been murdered. Jockey Tom Daley points them to suspects, promoter John Bishop, model Cara Delevingne, and Sheik Kanye West.
10	4	"Incognito"	George Shelley	6 July 2016
D.I Sleet and George Shelley investigate the murder of the hacker Ed Sheeran. Suspects include tech CEO Shia LaBeouf, DeathCorp honcho Sarah Millican and banker Jeremy Kyle.
11	5	"Head, Shoulders, Knees & Toes"	Emma Bunton	13 July 2016
This week DI Sleet is joined by Spice Girl Emma Bunton, investigating the death of James May, a cop from North Successville. May's police partner Jeremy Clarkson explains the details of the crime, while Sleet takes a shine to Chief of Police Nigella Lawson. Suspects include Fisherman Ian McKellen, cafe owner Katy Perry and wild man Louis Walsh.
12	6	"Memoirs"	'Clip Show', Jamie Laing	20 July 2016
Sleet reflectively takes us through his colourful memoirs as we see previously unseen moments from his life as a cop.

=== Series 3 (2017) ===
No. overall	No. in series	Title	Guest star	Original release date
13	1	"The Brass Gnome"	Richard Osman	19 April 2017
A piece of art is stolen, and Björk is murdered in the process. DI Sleet teams up with Richard Osman to investigate Arsène Wenger, Hillary Clinton, and Zayn Malik, with things coming to a head at an illegal art auction run by Bill Nighy.
14	2	"A Murder in Ye Olde Successville"	Martin Kemp	26 April 2017
Sleet travels back in time with Martin Kemp to investigate the death of lady of the night Rita Ora. Forensic pathologist Conor McGregor points them to suspects, brothel madam Paloma Faith, Professor will.i.am, posh gentleman Jamie Oliver and mailman Jonathan Ross.
15	3	"I Saw a Monster!"	Lorraine Kelly	3 May 2017
Sleet teams up with Lorraine Kelly to investigate the death of reporter Harry Hill, and sighting of a radioactive monster. When clues on Hill's body point them towards Hill's ex girlfriend Madonna, Ant & Dec and factory owner David Walliams, things take a turn for the worse.
16	4	"A Nest of Vipers"	Reggie Yates	10 May 2017
Sleet and Yates investigate the murder of undercover detective Noel Edmonds. They make a side trip to Sharon Osbourne’s Bandeoke night, before heading to an assassin's conference where they investigate killers Venus and Serena Williams and hitman Adrian Chiles.
17	5	"A Rat's Tale"	Professor Green	17 May 2017
Sleet and Green hunt down the killer of Commissioner Bear Grylls with the help of their alter egos, Rattman, Yonder Woman and Dormouse. A note left from the Commissioner points them to tech millionaire Piers Morgan, reporter Beyoncé Police Chief Gordon Ramsay and county councillor Alex Jones.
18	6	"The Big Sleet"	[Clip Show]	24 May 2017
Sleet must make his hardest decision yet. With some self-reflection on his past adventures, he must decide which persona to turn his back on forever, Rattman or Cop.

== American adaptation ==
In January 2022, it was announced that Netflix would be making an American adaptation of the series, titled Murderville. Murderville does away with the original series' concept of all the town residents being celebrity impersonations; instead, the townspeople (including all the murder suspects) are simply fictional characters.

The Netflix adaptation is produced by and stars Will Arnett as the character senior detective Terry Seattle and features guest stars Conan O'Brien, Annie Murphy, Ken Jeong, Kumail Nanjiani, Marshawn Lynch and Sharon Stone. All six episodes of Murderville premiered on 3 February 2022.
