= Stand Up Seoul =

English language comedy group in Seoul, South Korea

Stand Up Seoul is an English-language stand up comedy group based in Seoul, South Korea (founded by Brian Aylward initially as a comedy night in 2009) Aylward was a runner-up at the 2008 Hong Kong International Comedy Festival and has since returned to his home country of Canada to pursue a career in comedy.

Upon Brian's departure, Stand Up Seoul was helmed by Jeff Sinclair, Rudy Tyburczy, Erin Weber and Albert Escobedo. As of the spring of 2012, Erin Weber has gone to pursue her dream of being a comedian back in the USA. Her position was replaced by Adam Palmeter, whom as of March 2013, has left South Korea. All of the above are stand ups came from a varying degree of performance experience, but held a common goal of developing their craft, and the scene in Korea. In March, 2013 they celebrated their fourth anniversary.

From 2020 to 2022, the group was led by Korean comedian, host and beatboxer Sang Don Park and Korean comedian, comedy podcaster and producer Fernando Kim.

Currently, Stand Up Seoul is overseen by American comedian and producer Kristen Pimley, American writer and comedian Steve Gallas, Korean comedian Hojip Jeon, and Canadian actor Geoff Gaudet.

The group hosts weekly open-mic nights as well as monthly paid events. They have traveled extensively throughout South Korea, such as Busan, Gumi, Daegu, Pohang, Mokpo, Gwangju, Daejeon, Osan, Gunsan, Cheonan, and more. Stand Up Seoul has also brought many professional stand up comics to Seoul, so far, including Tom Cotter, Ted Alexandro, Kyle Kinane, James Adomian and in November 2012, Tom Rhodes. They have also had comedians Esther Ku and Danny Cho perform with them when they visited the country on vacation. In May 2013, they brought back Kyle Kinane, as well as Matt Braunger at the Seoul Renaissance Hotel. In November 2013, they had co-headliners Baron Vaughn and Ben Kronberg from the USA.

== Charity Work ==
Stand Up Seoul has a strong tradition of community involvement and philanthropy through its stand-up comedy showcases. The organization has hosted numerous charity events supporting various causes, such as providing clean water in Ukraine, assisting North Korean refugees, aiding single mothers in need, and helping the families of the victims of the Itaewon crowd disaster.
