= Atom TV =

- Country of origin: United States
- No. of seasons: 3
- No. of episodes: 36

Production
- Running time: 22 minutes

Original release
- Network: Comedy Central
- Release: June 24, 2008 – October 18, 2010

Atom TV is an American cable television comedy series featuring content from the website Atom.com. It aired on Comedy Central from June 24, 2008, to October 18, 2010, lasting three seasons and thirty-six episodes. Its timeslot was Monday nights at 2:00 am/1:00c and later 2:30 am/1:30c.

== Reception ==
Common Sense Media rated the show 3 out of 5 stars.
