= Anthony Atamanuik =

American writer, actor, and comedian

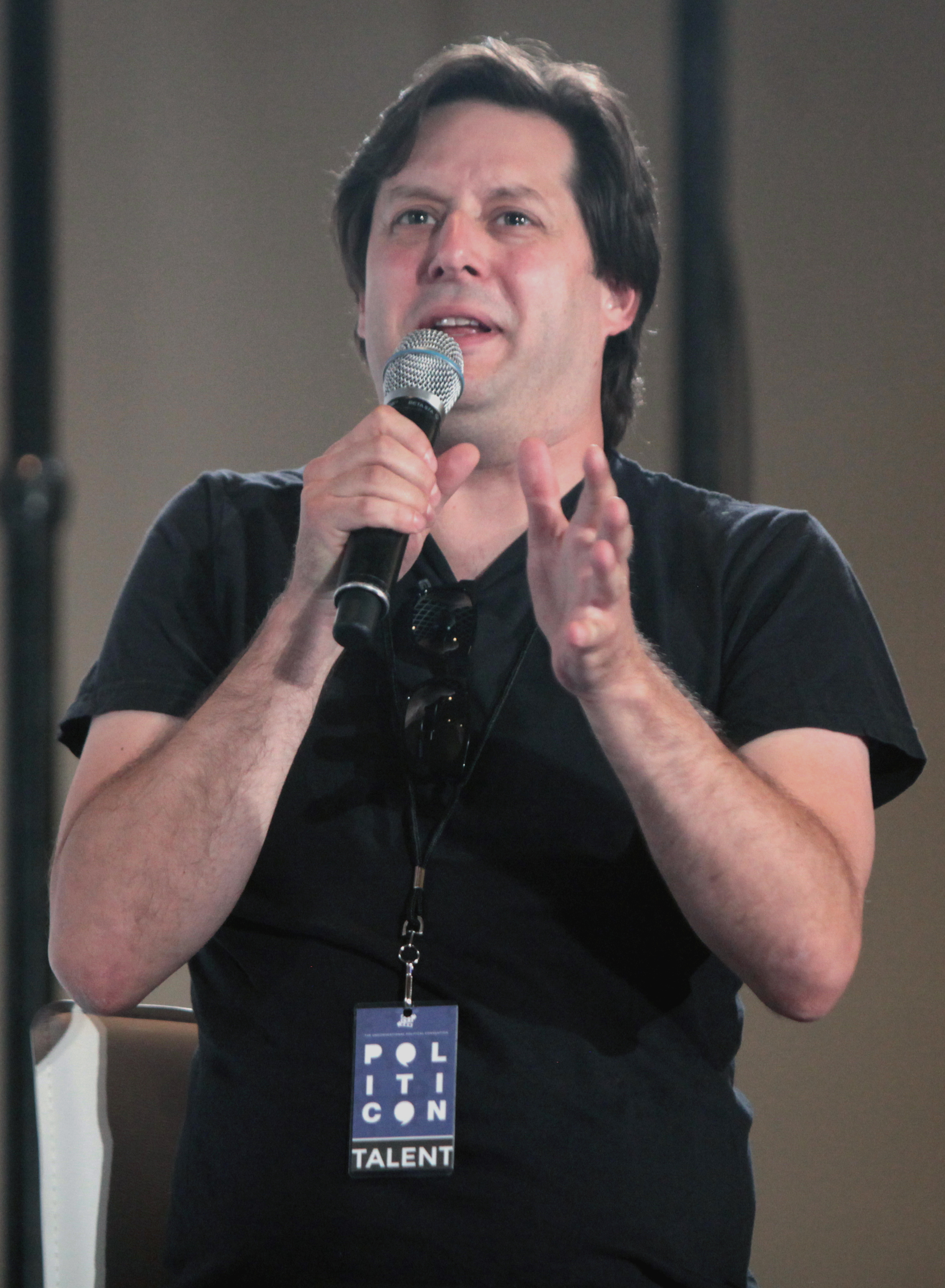
- Atamanuik at the 2016 Politicon
- Born: June 15, 1974 (age 52)
- Education: Emerson College
- Occupations: Writer, actor, comedian
- Years active: 1997–present

Anthony Atamanuik (/əˈtæmənɪk/; born June 15, 1974) is an American writer, actor, and comedian.

He impersonated U.S. President Donald Trump during the campaign and his presidency, first on the Trump vs. Bernie debate tour, and later on The President Show.

== Early life ==
Atamanuik was born to Marlena J. Yannetti, an actress, choreographer and dancer of Italian and Ashkenazi Jewish ancestry with credits including How to Succeed in Business Without Really Trying, and Lawrence Peter Atamanuik, a drummer of Ukrainian ancestry with credits including Seatrain, Alison Krauss, and Canadian band Crowbar.

== Career ==
In 1997, Atamanuik graduated with a Bachelor of Science degree in film theory from Emerson College. He moved to Los Angeles and worked for Jim Henson Interactive, Mr. Show, and Suzanne Somers. He moved to New York in 2000. In 2002 he began training and performing at the Upright Citizens Brigade. Atamanuik appeared in the shorts My Wife, The Ghost, and The Incredible Drunk. He is a member of the improv team Death by Roo and as a co-host on ASSSSCAT3000 and The Tony Show With Anthony Atamanuik and wrote for Time Traveling Bong.

On television, he appeared in Brett Gelman's Dinner in America (2016), 30 Rock, Broad City, Hulu's Difficult People, MTV's Teachers' Lounge, What We Do in the Shadows, Star Wars: Skeleton Crew, and, as himself, bartending on Watch What Happens Live.

Atamanuik created and starred in The President Show, which ran for one season on Comedy Central, with 20 episodes, from April to November 2017. On the show, he impersonated Donald Trump in both sketches and interviews with real guests. Atamunuik also parodied Trump on Tracey Ullman's Show and Tracey Breaks the News. According to NBC News, Atamanuik has watched "every rally" in order to learn how best to impersonate Trump.

== Trump impersonations outside of The President Show ==
- Trump Dump (2015) Upright Citizens Brigade
- Trump vs. Bernie Debate! (17 October 2015)(July 22, 2016)
- Trump vs. Bernie 2016 Debate Tour (2016)
- Trump vs. Bernie in the First Ever @midnight Presidential Debate (March 24, 2016) Comedy Central
- Trump vs. Bernie: Debate for America (April 27, 2016) Fusion TV
- The Chris Gethard Show: episode "The Truth Might Be Out There" (May 4, 2016)
- Tracey Breaks the News : One-off Special (June 23, 2017) BBC One
- Tracey Breaks the News : Series 1 and 2 (November 10, 2017; June 1, 2018)
- Tracey Ullman's Show : Season 3 HBO
- I Love You, America with Sarah Silverman (September 13, 2018)
- Unbreakable Kimmy Schmidt: episode "Sliding Van Doors" (January 25, 2019)
- Toast of London: episode "The Wrong Number (audio skit)" (May 1, 2020)
