= The President Show =

American comedy television series

- Genre: Political satire
- Created by: Anthony Atamanuik
- Directed by: Andre Allen
- Starring: Anthony Atamanuik; Peter Grosz
- Country of origin: United States
- Original language: English
- No. of seasons: 1
- No. of episodes: 20 (and 4 specials)

Production
- Executive producers: Anthony Atamanuik; Peter Grosz; Adam Pally; Jason Ross; Olivia Gerke; Josh Lieberman; Greg Walter
- Production locations: NEP Penn Studios, New York City, New York
- Camera setup: Multi-camera
- Running time: 21 minutes
- Production companies: 3 Arts Entertainment; Clone Wolf Productions; Pie Baby Productions

Original release
- Network: Comedy Central
- Release: April 27 – November 2, 2017

The President Show is an American comedy television series that premiered on April 27, 2017, on Comedy Central. The show was created by Anthony Atamanuik who also stars as Donald Trump, the President of the United States, alongside Peter Grosz as Mike Pence, then Vice President.

== Format ==
Introduced as "the forty-fifth and final President of the United States", Atamanuik as Trump begins each episode at a "press-conference" set, during which he announces tonight's theme and a variation of his catchphrase, "I'm the president. Can you believe it? Let's roll!", which signals a transition to the title sequence. After the opening, Trump is shown in the Oval Office set, accompanied by Peter Grosz as Mike Pence, and the two perform a segment pertaining to the recent week's news. Next, a pre-taped segment is shown with either Trump, Pence, or both on-location interacting with various groups of people in-character. After that, Trump interviews a guest at a Mar-a-Lago set. Finally, back in the Oval Office, Trump and Pence deliver a farewell address, often taking form of a sketch, which transitions into the closing credits.

== Cast and characters ==
=== Main ===
- Anthony Atamanuik as Donald Trump
- Peter Grosz as Mike Pence

=== Recurring ===
- John Gemberling as Steve Bannon
- Mila Filatova as Melania Trump
- Mario Cantone as Anthony Scaramucci
- James Adomian as Bernie Sanders
- Adam Pally as Donald Trump Jr.

=== Guest ===
- Neil Casey as Andrew Jackson
- Ric Stoneback as Roger Ailes
- Lewis Black as Trump's subconscious
- Kathy Najimy as Ivana Trump
- Kathy Griffin as Kellyanne Conway
- Griffin Dunne as Robert Mueller
- Stephanie March as Ivanka Trump

== Episodes ==
=== Season 1 (2017) ===
No.	Guest	Theme	Original release date	US viewers (millions)
1	Keith Olbermann	America First	April 27, 2017	0.639
The president breaks down who's being nice and who isn't and pays a visit to the "real" New York, and Keith Olbermann stops by to discuss his web series, The Resistance with Keith Olbermann.
2	Dan Savage	Surprise!	May 4, 2017	0.394
The president signs some executive orders that he thought of all by himself, befriends a portrait of Andrew Jackson, and talks dirty with Savage Lovecast host Dan Savage.
3	Linda Sarsour	Mothers	May 11, 2017	0.566
The president reacts to what the crooked media is saying about him, makes some new besties, and sits down with co-chair of the 2017 Women's March Linda Sarsour. And in a homage to Psycho, Trump is haunted by the voice of his mother (Anthony Atamanuik).
4	Deepak Chopra	Intelligence	May 18, 2017	0.510
The president receives a visit from a frumpy old friend, then getting a guided lesson in meditation and self-realization following a sit down with You Are the Universe author Deepak Chopra.
5	S. E. Cupp	My Journey	May 25, 2017	0.322
The president goes on a journey overseas, shows off his souvenirs from other world leaders and chats with S.E. Cupp about America's mistrust of the media.
6	Michael Eric Dyson	Loyalty	June 1, 2017	0.484
The president shakes up his inner circle, makes a big deal on the golf course, and Dr. Michael Eric Dyson stops by to discuss white privilege in America.
7	Evan McMullin	Stunt	June 8, 2017	0.434
The president dodges questions about James Comey, visits his pals in the Land of Fake Believe and sits down with former CIA operative Evan McMullin.
8	Bassem Youssef	Party	June 15, 2017	0.419
The president turns his daily briefing into a game show, visits his hometown and sits down with political satirist Bassem Youssef to discuss escaping persecution in Egypt.
9	Matt Walsh	Witch Hunt	June 22, 2017	0.429
The president finds out from Steve Bannon (John Gemberling) who is a witch and who isn't; holds auditions for a defense lawyer with Gloria Allred, Alan Dershowitz and Ron Kuby; and tries an improv scene with Veep star Matt Walsh.
10	Matt Taibbi	Containment	July 13, 2017	0.404
The president addresses the press about a "horrible virus" plaguing Americans and his son Donald Trump Jr., signs important executive orders and sits down with Rolling Stone reporter Matt Taibbi.
11	Joy Behar	Made in America	July 20, 2017	0.414
The president reacts to what the crooked media is saying about him, meets up with former mobsters and sits down with The View co-host Joy Behar.
12	Carole Radziwill	Reality	July 27, 2017	0.492
The president introduces his fun new White House communications director Anthony Scaramucci (Mario Cantone), finds out what the American people think of him and sits down with reality TV star Carole Radziwill.
13	Ana Marie Cox	Chaos	August 3, 2017	0.429
The president addresses the concerns about chaos in the White House, hosts a game night for his best friends as a giant John F. Kelly looks for Scaramucci, and sits down with political columnist Ana Marie Cox.
14	DeRay McKesson	Civility	August 24, 2017	0.414
The president breaks down who's being nice and who isn't with Steve Bannon adding his spin on it, visits his friends and hero Scapegoat in the magical Land of Fake Believe, and sits down with activist DeRay Mckesson.
15	Nina Turner	Leadership	August 31, 2017	0.525
The president praises brave acts by the greatest Americans in the wake of Hurricane Harvey, visits an etiquette school and sits down with Our Revolution president Nina Turner.
16	Frank Rich	Flag	September 28, 2017	0.268
The president looks back on a disastrous week, learns about the impeachment process from Rep. Brad Sherman and sits down with Veep executive producer Frank Rich.
17	Paul Rieckhoff	Why?	October 5, 2017	0.254
It's a somber week as the president screams at the TV, tackles basic training with transgender vets and sits down with veterans advocate Paul Rieckhoff.
18	Ana Kasparian	Friends	October 19, 2017	0.275
The president goes to see a psychologist and sits down with The Young Turks' Ana Kasparian.
19	Lindy West	Fear	October 26, 2017	0.337
The president plays a spooky round of Prez Your Luck, has a terrifying encounter with the Muellerman and sits down with Shrill author Lindy West.
20	Joseph Cirincione	Escape	November 2, 2017	0.275
Drowning after sinking a truck in a river, the president begins to unravel as he mentally enacts the season one finale. He plays Six Degrees of Hillary Clinton, talks with nuclear weapons expert Joe Cirincione with a cameo appearance by Keith Olbermann, and takes a trip to the destroyed Land of Fake Believe where he meets his repentant subconscious (Lewis Black).

=== Specials ===
Title	Theme	Original release date	US viewers (millions)
"A Nation in Pieces"	N/A	September 22, 2017	N/A
A clip show looking back at some of the best moments from The President Show.
"I Came Up with Christmas: A President Show Christmas"	Savior	November 30, 2017	0.394
The president celebrates the first-ever Christmas (which he created) with his friends by becoming a mall Santa, narrating a cartoon Christmas story, and performing in a Nativity play while dodging reporter Bebe Neuwirth's questions.
"Make America Great-A-Thon: A President Show Special"	N/A	April 3, 2018	0.357
The president hosts a telethon to raise money for various projects that Congress will not fund such as his proposed Border Wall and infrastructure. Along with vice-president Mike Pence, Don Jr., and Kellyanne Conway, Trump takes to the Oval Office to raise funds via an old-fashioned telethon while on the verge of being arrested by the FBI.
"A President Show Documentary: The Fall of Donald Trump"	TBA	October 22, 2018	0.383
In the future, Trump becomes absolutely mad with power after the Democrats win back the house in the 2018 midterm elections. In 2020, he runs against himself, as he's also the Democratic nominee, but loses to Jill Stein, the Green Party nominee, due to Russian interference. Four years later, he goes off the grid.

== Production ==
=== Background ===
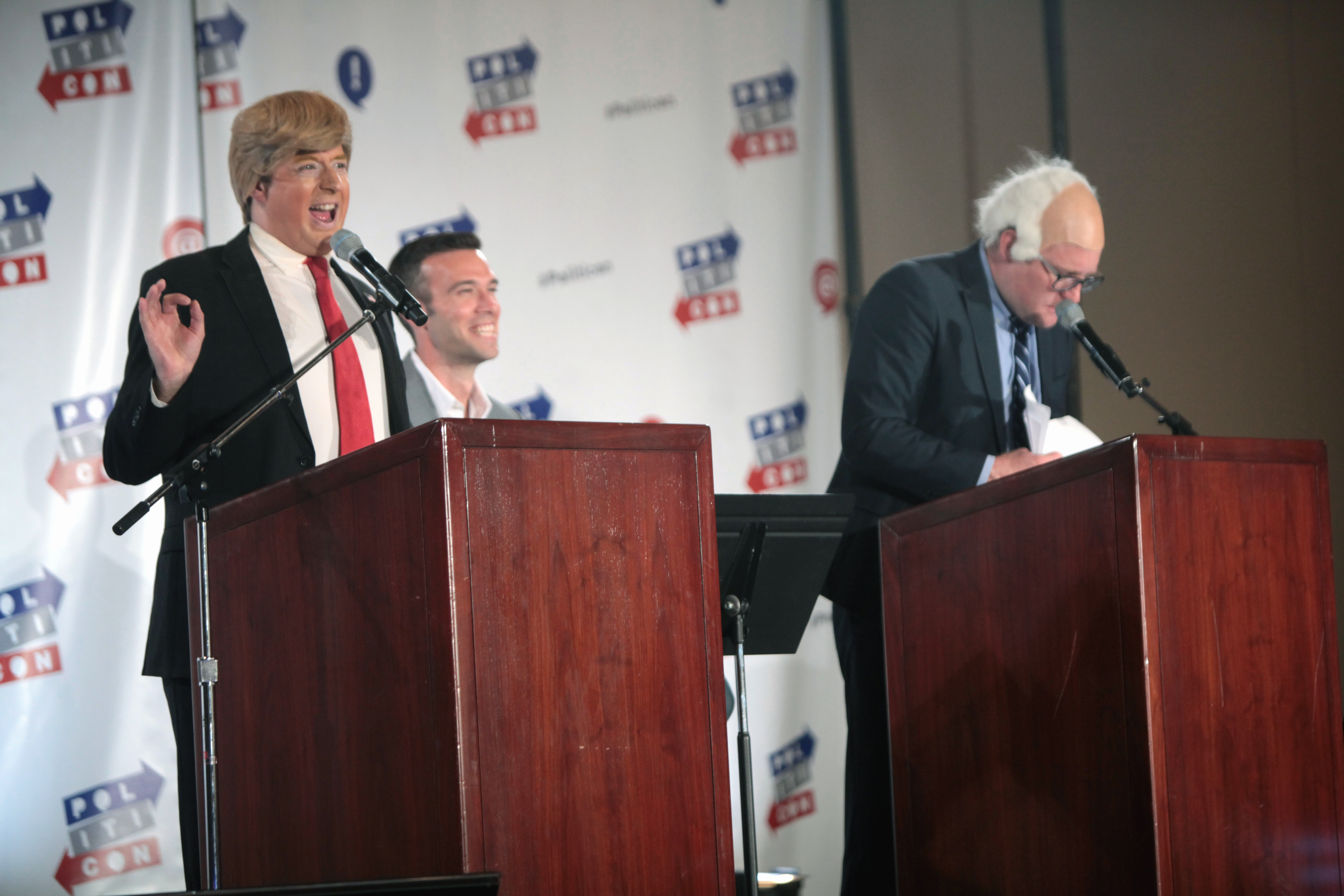
Atamanuik in character as Trump (left) and James Adomian in character as Bernie Sanders (right) in June 2016

Atamanuik began impersonating Trump during the 2016 United States presidential campaign. His first efforts were improvisations with the Upright Citizens Brigade in August 2015. In a subsequent sketch series called Trump vs. Bernie, Atamanuik challenged James Adomian, who played Bernie Sanders, in mock debates. The two toured the United States and appeared on television. They went on Comedy Central's @midnight in March 2016, and had a one-hour sketch special on Fusion in May 2016. Atamanuik also appeared by himself as Trump on several shows during the campaign, including @midnight, The Chris Gethard Show and The View.

Atamanuik would later originate his idea for the series by envisioning his idea of President Donald Trump's version of a fireside chat – "this sort of late night show in the vein of Steve Allen and Johnny Carson... but set in the Oval Office".

=== Development ===
On March 30, 2017, Comedy Central announced a new late night program via two Twitter accounts: @PresidentShow and @LateNightDonald. The network did not provide further details at the time of this announcement. A few days later, the series was officially announced. It was reported that the series was created by Anthony Atamanuik and executive produced by Adam Pally. The show was set to feature Atamanuik hosting as president Donald Trump and Peter Grosz acting as his sidekick in the form of vice president Mike Pence. Production companies involved with the series were set to include Clone Wolf Productions and 3 Arts Entertainment.

The show's production staff was eventually filled out with Andre Allen acting as director and Atamanuik, Grosz, Pally, Jason Ross, Olivia Gerke, Josh Lieberman, and Greg Walter set as executive producers. The show is presented in the typical format of a late-night talk show, including desk segments, field pieces, and guest interviews. The show's writers are Atamaniuk, Grosz, Ross, John Gemberling, Mitra Jouhari, Christine Nangle, Rae Sanni, Evan Waite, Neil Casey, and Emmy Blotnick.

=== Casting ===
On March 29, 2018, it was announced that Kathy Griffin had been cast as Kellyanne Conway in the "Make America Great-A-Thon" special. The following day, it was announced that Griffin Dunne had also been cast in the special as Robert Mueller. On September 27, 2018, it was announced that Stephanie March had been cast as Ivanka Trump in the "A President Show Documentary: The Fall Of Donald Trump" special and that Grosz, Griffin, Cantone, Pally, and Gemberling would reprise their respective characters.

== Release ==
=== Marketing ===
Simultaneously alongside the show's official announcement, Comedy Central released the first teaser trailer for the series.

Comedy Central conducted a viral marketing campaign to advertise the show by inserting footage in episodes of The Daily Show and @midnight to make it appear the network had been hacked; footage shown included a web address with a Russian country code, which redirected to The President Show's Twitter account.

=== Renewal ===
On May 23, 2017, Comedy Central extended the first season by ordering an additional seven episodes. On January 15, 2018, Comedy Central president Kent Alterman discussed the show at the annual Television Critics Association's winter press tour. In regards to the show's future he said, "We're working that out" and that "we'll have something soon." On March 14, 2018, it was announced that the series would officially return for two one-hour specials. The first special was announced as being titled Make America Great-A-Thon: A President Show Special and that it would air on April 3, 2018. On September 27, 2018, it was announced that the second special had been titled A President Show Documentary: The Fall Of Donald Trump and that it would air on October 22, 2018.

== Reception ==
=== Critical response ===
The President Show has been met with a mixed response from critics since its premiere. On the review aggregation website Rotten Tomatoes, the series holds a 67% approval rating with an average rating of 6.67 out of 10 based on 12 reviews. Metacritic, which uses a weighted average, assigned the series a score of 58 out of 100 based on 5 reviews, indicating "mixed or average reviews".

Writing in The Daily Beast, Matt Wilstein called Atamanuik's work "the most scathing and hilarious impression of the 45th president in a very crowded field... On Comedy Central’s The President Show and a series of increasingly apocalyptic specials, Atamanuik did far more than just jokingly mimic Trump. Rather, he tried to take viewers inside the demented mind of the most dangerous president in modern American history."

=== Ratings ===
The series premiere had one million viewers over the course of three days and the show averages about 870,000 viewers.
