= Tracey Ullman's Show =

British comedy television series (2016–2018)

- Genre: Sketch comedy
- Created by: Tracey Ullman
- Written by: Tracey Ullman (devised by)
- Directed by: Dominic Brigstocke; Nick Collett
- Starring: Tracey Ullman
- Theme music composer: Richard Thomas
- Composers: Richard Thomas; Andy Marlow
- Country of origin: United Kingdom
- Original language: English
- No. of series: 3
- No. of episodes: 19 (list of episodes)

Production
- Executive producers: Tracey Ullman; Myfanwy Moore (2016); Ben Farrell (2016); Gareth Edwards
- Producer: Caroline Norris
- Cinematography: Martin Hawkins (2016, 2018); Pete Rowe (2017); Greg Duffield (2018)
- Editors: Nigel Williams (2016, 2018); Mark Everson (2017); Adam Windmill (2017)
- Running time: 30 minutes
- Production companies: BBC (2016); BBC Studios; Allan McKeown Presents

Original release
- Network: BBC One; HBO
- Release: 11 January 2016 – 2 November 2018

Related
- Tracey Breaks the News

Tracey Ullman's Show is a British sketch comedy television series starring Tracey Ullman.

The series premiered on BBC One on 11 January 2016. The programme marks her first project for the broadcaster in over thirty years and her first original project for British television in twenty-two.

Following the airing of two series, the show was spun off into the topical comedy programme, Tracey Breaks the News, in 2017. The show was recut and sold internationally under the Tracey Ullman's Show banner.

== Premise and format ==
Each episode offers a glimpse of British life from dusk to dawn, covering the experiences of both everyday citizens and famous figures. Featured subjects range from locals and tourists to those attempting to enter the country illicitly. A typical episode consists of sketches lasting one to three minutes, with one storyline acting as the "spine" of the episode. Additionally, each installment features an original song written by Ullman and composer Richard Thomas (known for Jerry Springer: The Opera).

By Series 3, the show shifted away from its original "day in the life" premise toward a more topical format, focusing primarily on impersonations of world leaders.

== Cast ==
(L–R): Ullman as Judi Dench, herself, and Angela Merkel

=== Starring ===
- Tracey Ullman as Various

=== Supporting ===
- Lucy Aarden as Georgia May Jagger
- Zahra Ahmadi
- Ben Ashenden
- Emily Atack
- Elizabeth Berrington
- Kevin Bishop
- Ricky Champ
- Jamie Demetriou
- Amanda Dickinson
- Martha Howe-Douglas
- Rosie Dwyer
- Jade Ewen
- James Fleet
- Jason Forbes
- Tony Gardner
- Tala Gouveia
- Derek Griffiths
- Liam Hourican
- Laurence Howarth
- Katherine Jakeways
- Luke Kempner
- Dave Lamb
- Joan Linder
- Omar Malik
- Georgia Maskery
- Johnny McKeown
- Ben Miller as Rupert Murdoch
- Lucy Montgomery
- Dominique Moore
- Olivia Morgan
- Carlotta Morelli
- Aaron Neil
- Sue Elliott-Nicholls
- Tracy-Ann Oberman
- Laurence Rickard
- Colin Salmon
- Dan Skinner
- Samantha Spiro
- Alfie Stewart
- Nico Tatarowicz
- Daniel Lawrence Taylor
- Gwen Taylor
- Brona C. Titley
- Kim Wall
- Ben Willbond

== Episodes ==
Series	Episodes	Originally released	
Series	Episodes	First released	Last released
1	6	11 January 2016	15 February 2016
Special		25 December 2016	
2	6	3 February 2017	17 March 2017
3	6	28 September 2018	2 November 2018

== Background ==
=== Conception and development ===
In late 2014, while promoting the film Into the Woods, Tracey Ullman revealed plans to write something new for television the following year. "Every five years it comes to me to sort of do what I do again; I throw a load of stuff at the wall, and some of it works and some of it obviously doesn't, but that's the nature of television. I love TV." Her American Showtime series, Tracey Ullman's State of the Union, ran for three seasons, concluding in 2010. It was both a departure and a return of sorts. Instead of playing only original characters—a staple of Ullman's comedy—the show saw her imitating real people (celebrities, politicians, etc.), something she hadn't done since her early days at the BBC with Three of a Kind, the show that made her a household name in UK.

In 2014, she was invited by BBC One controller Charlotte Moore and head of comedy production Myfanwy Moore to discuss the possibility of working on a new project together for the broadcaster. The trio hit it off and came up with a concept: a multi-camera show in which Ullman plays "a multitude of diverse and distinct characters living in, or visiting, the busy global hub that is the UK."

While visiting, Ullman noted the vast number of women now heading the broadcaster—a stark contrast to her early days at the BBC. "When I was there years and years ago, it was five men in bow ties who talked about the war and The Goons... it was so male-dominated." However, some things remained the same: "The important things haven't changed, though. The BBC still provides an environment that allows you the freedom to create the best shows possible."

I mean, yeah, I've done that eclectic multi-character thing. I'm getting older now, and you begin to think, God, what's funny? What can you say? It's tough. It's bleeding rough out there. [Adopts a deep news anchor voice], "Terrorism, cyber-terrorism threat, breaking news, blackened stool problems, are you allergic to this? Have you got a lawsuit? Did you take this drug in the last six months? You could die! Five things in your refrigerator that could you kill you!" It's like, good God, what can we laugh at? Don't say this, don't say that. But there's always something to laugh at.

— Tracey Ullman in December 2014, on the prospect of doing a new show

Ullman revealed her long-held desire to return to British television in 2015. "I have lived in America for a really long time, but I was never away from England. I was always there; I just didn't work there. I wasn't offered anything there, really. So when the BBC called me last year, I was really thrilled. I mean, I wanted to do something for England. The last thing I'd done was with Michael Palin. We did [Tracey Ullman: A Class Act] in 1992, I think. We did a show about the class system in Britain, and it was just wonderful fun. HBO picked that up, and from there I did [Tracey Takes On...] So, it started from a British show."

After hitting it big in the United States, her star began to wane in Britain. Ullman, who likes to study people to create characters, says that she enjoys the anonymity of living in London: "I can observe people on the tube without them recognizing me."

On 4 March 2015, a formal announcement was made confirming the project, with Ullman saying that it was a "privilege to be doing this," adding: "I still feel as inspired to inhabit people as I did when I was six, standing on the windowsill in my mother's bedroom, putting on a show." Shane Allen, controller of comedy commissioning, added: "It's about time the Americans gave her back. Tracey has been the missing gem in the British comedy crown for too long. Talent doesn't come much bigger and the BBC audience is in for a huge treat."

A fan of Armando Iannucci, Ullman assembled a writing team which includes Veep scribes, Georgia Pritchett, Kevin Cecil and Andy Riley, with The League of Gentlemen's Jeremy Dyson acting as both series writer and script supervisor.

The show marks the first time in a long time that Ullman has made a series without her producing partner and husband of thirty years, Allan McKeown, who died in 2013. "Emotionally it was great to get out after having worked with my husband for 30 years." The show is, however, produced by the BBC along with McKeown's production company, Allan McKeown Presents—now run by Ullman. "So he is still presenting me..."

The show's first two series features a laugh track, something Ullman was hesitant about using. "That's a very BBC thing to do. I hate things like that on a show. But when we played it, it kind of worked. It makes it sound like you're connecting with people. Comedy has gotten a bit cold lately, and neurotic and depressed. This is a nice BBC One family show. It's not too arch or bleak." All laughter is genuine and was captured via live screenings before a studio audience at BBC Radio Theatre.

=== Production ===
Writing on the series began in February 2015 with principal photography commencing 29 June and wrapping in mid-August. The show was shot entirely on location due to no studio space being available in the UK. "But you can just be completely mobile now, and set up a video village anywhere", explained Ullman to Televisual magazine. Audience screenings and recordings took place in September 2015 at BBC Radio Theatre.

On 5 March 2016, the BBC announced that it had ordered a second series of the programme. In a press release, Ullman stated: "It has been a pleasure being back at the BBC, and I am thrilled to get the opportunity to write more shows with my brilliant team. The warm reception from the British public has meant a lot to me personally. I want to thank them and let Dame Judi Dench and Chancellor Angela Merkel know I couldn’t have done it without you girls. Here's to season two."

Filming on Series 2 began on 27 June 2016 and wrapped on 19 August. On 2 July, BBC Comedy released a clip of Ullman made up as Angela Merkel reacting to the news that Boris Johnson had chosen not to run for Prime Minister. Comedian Ben Miller was confirmed as a guest star for a sketch in which he will play media mogul Rupert Murdoch with Ullman portraying his wife and former model Jerry Hall. Audience screenings of the new sketches took place at BBC Radio Theatre on 10, 11 September and 31 October.

According to the Radio Times, Ullman was set to impersonate SNP leader Nicola Sturgeon, as well as an "eerily accurate" Clare Balding. Brexit is referenced in the second series. "It made it better, more poignant," said Ullman. Unlike Series 1, each episode of Series 2 opens with a parody of a BBC show before the opening title sequence.

== Tracey Breaks the News ==
On 26 May 2017, the BBC announced that it had ordered a new topical half-hour Tracey Ullman special, Tracey Breaks the News, for BBC One. The show was inspired by and due to air shortly after the 2017 United Kingdom general election. Expected impersonations included Angela Merkel and Nicola Sturgeon, as well as Ullman's first takes on Prime Minister Theresa May and Melania Trump. Like Tracey Ullman's Show, it features a mix of famous and everyday people reacting to the aftermath of the general election along with the anniversary of the Brexit vote. It includes the reactions of not only the UK, but also Europeans and Russians. "I'm excited the BBC has asked me to make a show at this time. We've decided to shake it up with a more topical format because things move so fast these days it's like every 10 minutes I'm voting for something. There's never been a better time to be imitating world-famous political women, and I admire and thank them all: Angela Merkel, Nicola Sturgeon, and my home girl newbie Theresa May. I can't wait to get stuck in – thanks to the BBC and my brilliant team. It really is a privilege."

== Reception ==
=== Critical response ===
Series 1 received generally favourable reviews from critics. Metacritic rated the series 70/100 based on 7 reviews. On the review aggregator website Rotten Tomatoes, 93% of 24 critics' reviews are positive. Several critics chided the BBC's decision to give the show a 'graveyard' time slot. Ullman responded that she didn't believe there was "appointment TV" anymore, and that people could watch whenever they wanted on catch up.

In the show's second series, a sketch involving Christian discrimination was lauded by Christian commentators. A sketch which turns the tables on victim blaming in sexual assault cases received international critical acclaim after it went viral on social media (even in China). The sketch was viewed over 32 million times.

=== Celebrity reaction ===
I wanted to do a series of national treasures, which I think we have in England.

— Tracey Ullman

Aside from her original characters, the show features Ullman impersonating an array of public figures: Theresa May, Judi Dench, Nicola Sturgeon, Maggie Smith, and members of the British royal family, Camilla Parker-Bowles and Carole Middleton.

She received considerable international attention for her portrayal of German Chancellor Angela Merkel. On 23 June 2017, BBC One's The One Show reached out to Angela Merkel's office and received a statement back regarding Ullman's impersonation: "Thank you very much for your email requesting a statement from Chancellor Merkel for the hilarious Tracey Ullman. I am very sorry, but due to the Chancellor's extremely busy schedule, she's in Brussels right now, and the G20 summit is just around the corner, she will not be able to send the requested statement."

Ullman contends that her impersonations are played with great admiration and affection. "I hope they take it in the right spirit!" Judi Dench reacted positively to Ullman portraying her as getting away with unethical public behaviour because she is a national treasure. Dench's daughter, Finty Williams, posted a clip of Ullman playing her mother on Facebook with the caption, "brilliant, just brilliant." Critics also praised the impersonation, with one writer saying: "Her impersonation of Dench is so spot on that, for a second or two, you can't be sure she is not the real deal. Her performance easily transcends the make-up thanks to her mastery of posture, gesture and facial control as well as pitch-perfect vocals." In April 2017, while speaking to BBC Radio 4's Front Row, Dench commented on Ullman's portrayal, saying that she doted on it, and dubbed Ullman as brilliant. "But I get into trouble now if I go into a shop with a bag over my arm [...] A man came up to me in M&S the other day and said to me, 'I've got my eye on you'." Speaking to the Radio Times, Dench further stated, "It's so anarchic, I love it. It's much more like me than anything else," although she detests being referred to as a 'national treasure'."

One person Ullman doesn't expect to have the same reaction as Dench is the Duchess of Cornwall, Camilla Parker-Bowles. "For Camilla, I don't think I'm going to get any Facebook approval!" In Series One, she plays both grandmothers to the youngest heir to the British royal throne, Camilla Parker-Bowles and Carole Middleton. "It occurred to me that Prince George must get taken to different grandmothers, you know? We just imagined [an earthy] Camilla: Do you want to drown a kitten in a barrel or put your hand up a horse's uterus?"

Maggie Smith is portrayed as an actress who prefers to work from home (or not work at all). Smith's portrayal was inspired by an incident that reportedly took place on the set of Downton Abbey. Ullman: "[...] I heard a rumour that one day she was miserable on the show and they said, 'Maggie, what can we do? What can we do to make you more comfortable?' And she went, [in Smith's voice] 'Write me a death scene.'"

In the show's second series, Ullman portrays current Scottish First Minister Nicola Sturgeon as megalomaniac who is after more than just Scottish Independence. Westminster's youngest MP, Mhairi Black assists Sturgeon in the series opener by torturing a captive JK Rowling. On Sturgeon, Ullman says: "I like her a lot and respect her steeliness. [...] I would love her to meet [Donald Trump] and play golf with him and whup his ass. [My co-writer] Jeremy Dyson imagined her as a Bond villain — we filmed for two days in Chislehurst Caves, it was freezing and I was wearing pink, four-inch high heels. But I felt very powerful, and the crew were very much under my command. I think she will like it — she seems to have a good sense of humour." Upon seeing her portrayal, Mhairi Black (impersonated by actress Olivia Morgan) was quoted as saying "It was all right. It was quite a bizarre scenario. But I thought it was quite clever and quite witty." In an interview for the Metro newspaper during the 2017 United Kingdom general election, Nicola Sturgeon was asked about Ullman's impersonation of her. "I've not seen all of them but I had to watch some because I've heard so much about it. I thought it was really funny." When asked if she should her in all the "Brexit drama", Sturgeon responded: "I definitely think she should! She's got the outfit and everything!"

Beginning with the show's 2016 Christmas special, "The Best of Tracey Ullman's Show", Ullman plays a workaholic Clare Balding. "I like Clare. She was captain of the volleyball team at school. I watched her present the Olympics and she's incredible. She's really passionate when talking about horses, and she talks really fast... 'Beautiful filly, beautiful filly...' She never stops, you never feel uncomfortable with her, she knows how to talk to everybody. And I got this feeling that she was like, 'Oh, don't worry, I'll work the Christmas holidays, I can do that show, I'll work Boxing Day as well, nothing like the holidays.' She never stops."

In Series 2, Ullman portrays a very bitter Germaine Greer. Greer, who in recent years has come under fire for her controversial transgender views, complains about being silenced by the media to anyone who will listen in the series. "I think Germaine Greer has become intellectually homeless, so I play her at a bus stop looking homeless. [In my version] she was this great sex symbol and she likes to talk about s****ing Martin Amis in the 60s, but what's she done recently? She's constantly blaming old age: 'You try being old! It's the biggest sin of all.'"

Rupert Murdoch's daughter Elisabeth Murdoch came up to Ullman and told her that the family approved and liked what she was doing with the show's sketches about their family. "He's always had a good sense of humour, Rupert," said Ullman to WNYC's Leonard Lopate.

=== Awards and nominations ===
Year	Award	Category	Recipient(s)/Nominee(s)	Result	Ref(s)
2016	Royal Television Society Awards	Make Up Design – Entertainment & Non Drama	Vanessa White, Floris Schuller & Neill Gorton	Won	
2017	British Academy Television Craft Awards	Make Up & Hair Design	Vanessa White, Floris Schuller, Neill Gorton	Nominated	
2017	Rockie Awards	Music, Performance, Arts & Variety	Tracey Ullman's Show	Won	
2017	69th Primetime Emmy Awards	Outstanding Variety Sketch Series	Tracey Ullman's Show	Nominated	
2018	70th Primetime Emmy Awards	Outstanding Costumes for a Variety, Nonfiction, or Reality Programming	Helen Woolfenden, Emma Burnand, Claudia Bassi (for "Episode 1")	Nominated	
2018	70th Primetime Emmy Awards	Outstanding Variety Sketch Series	Tracey Ullman's Show	Nominated	

== Home media ==
=== DVD ===
Series	Release dates			Bonus features
Series	Region 1	Region 2	Region 4	Bonus features
1	–	22 February 2016	1 February 2017	Photo Gallery

=== Streaming ===
As of March 2020, the series is currently available via the digital video subscription service BritBox. As of August 2025, all three series of the show are available to stream through The Roku Channel in the US. All three seasons of Tracey Ullman's Show were added to BritBox in the US on 21 January 2026.

== International distribution ==
HBO has picked up the American rights to the show; the first season began airing 28 October 2016. The network began broadcasting the show's second season 20 October 2017. On 30 August, American HBO announced that it would begin airing a third season of the show on 28 September 2018. It made its international premiere in the United States prior to its HBO launch at the 2018 Tribeca TV Festival. The event was held on 21 September 2018, with Ullman taking part in a Q&A session hosted by actress Meryl Streep. Aside from HBO in the United States, the show's international distributor, the UK-based DRG, announced that it had also sold the show's third season to HBO Europe and ITV Choice in Asia as of September 2018.

Country	Broadcasters
Afghanistan	ITV Choice
Algeria	ITV Choice
Australia	Stan
Bahrain	ITV Choice
Canada	HBO Canada
Germany	NDR, ZDF
Iceland	RÚV
South Korea	ITV Choice
Taiwan	ITV Choice
United Kingdom	ITV Choice
United States	HBO
