= Philip May =

British investment manager (born 1957)

Sir Philip May
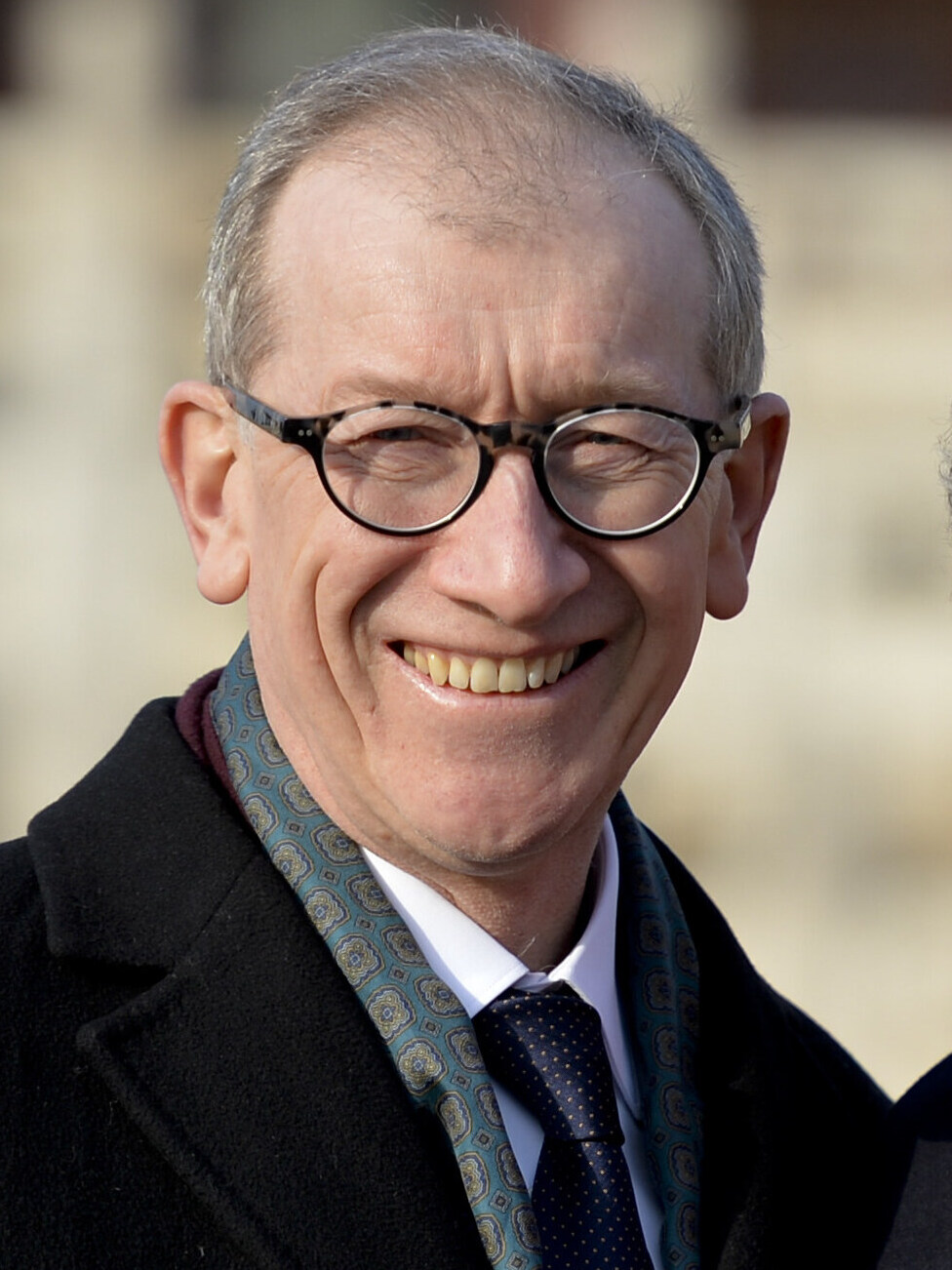
- May in 2018
- Born: Philip John May; 1957 (age 68–69); Norwich, England
- Education: Calday Grange Grammar School
- Alma mater: Lincoln College, Oxford
- Known for: Spouse of the prime minister of the United Kingdom (2016–2019)
- Political party: Conservative
- Spouse(s): Theresa May (m. 1980)
- Residence: Sonning, Berkshire, England

Sir Philip John May (born 1957) is an English investment manager. He is married to Theresa May, who was Prime Minister of the United Kingdom from 2016 to 2019. He is the current Chairman of the Athenaeum Club, London.

== Early life ==
May was born in Norwich in 1957. His father was a sales representative for a shoe wholesaler, while his mother taught French. He grew up on the Wirral, attending school in Heswall and then Calday Grange Grammar School in West Kirby. May studied history at Lincoln College, Oxford, and was elected President of the Oxford Union in 1979. He succeeded future Conservative MP Sir Alan Duncan in the role before handing over the baton to journalist Michael Crick.

== Financial career ==
May has worked in finance since graduating from Oxford University. In 2005, he joined the financial group Capital Group as a relationship manager; he had previously been a fund manager for de Zoete & Bevan, Prudential Portfolio Managers and Deutsche Asset Management. His former LinkedIn profile listed his focuses in work as pension fund and insurance relationship management.

In regards to his persona, one of his colleagues told The Guardian that "around the office, he is a fairly head-down type of guy. There is a stereotypical investment manager with a big ego – he's not like that at all."

After his wife Theresa May emerged as the remaining candidate for the Conservative Party leadership, May's employer issued a statement saying his current job does not make him responsible for investment decisions: "[May] is not involved with, and doesn't manage, money and is not a portfolio manager. His job is to ensure the clients are happy with the service and that we understand their goals."

== Involvement in politics ==
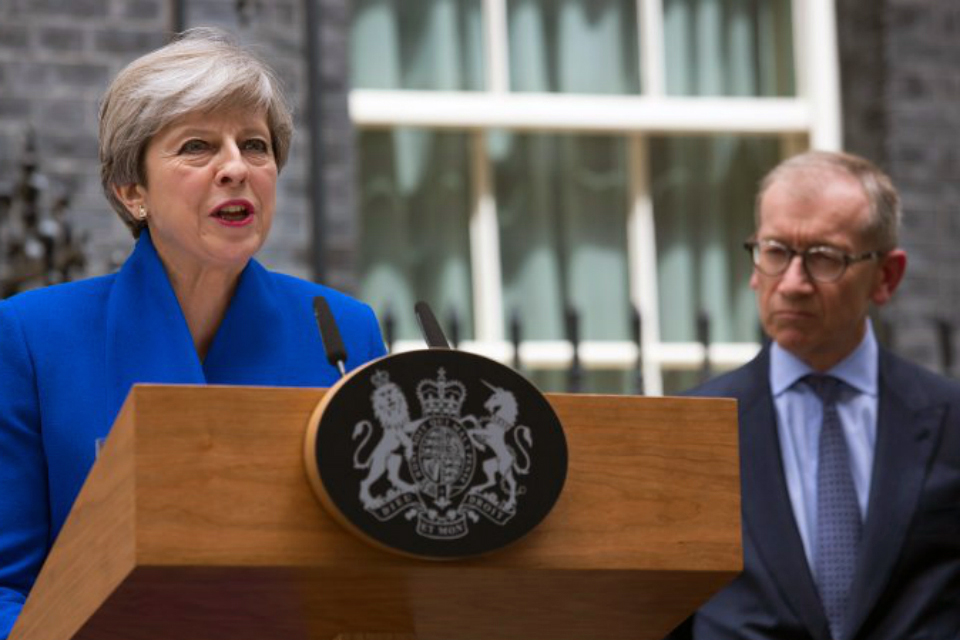
May (right) by his wife's side after her being returned as PM at the 2017 general election

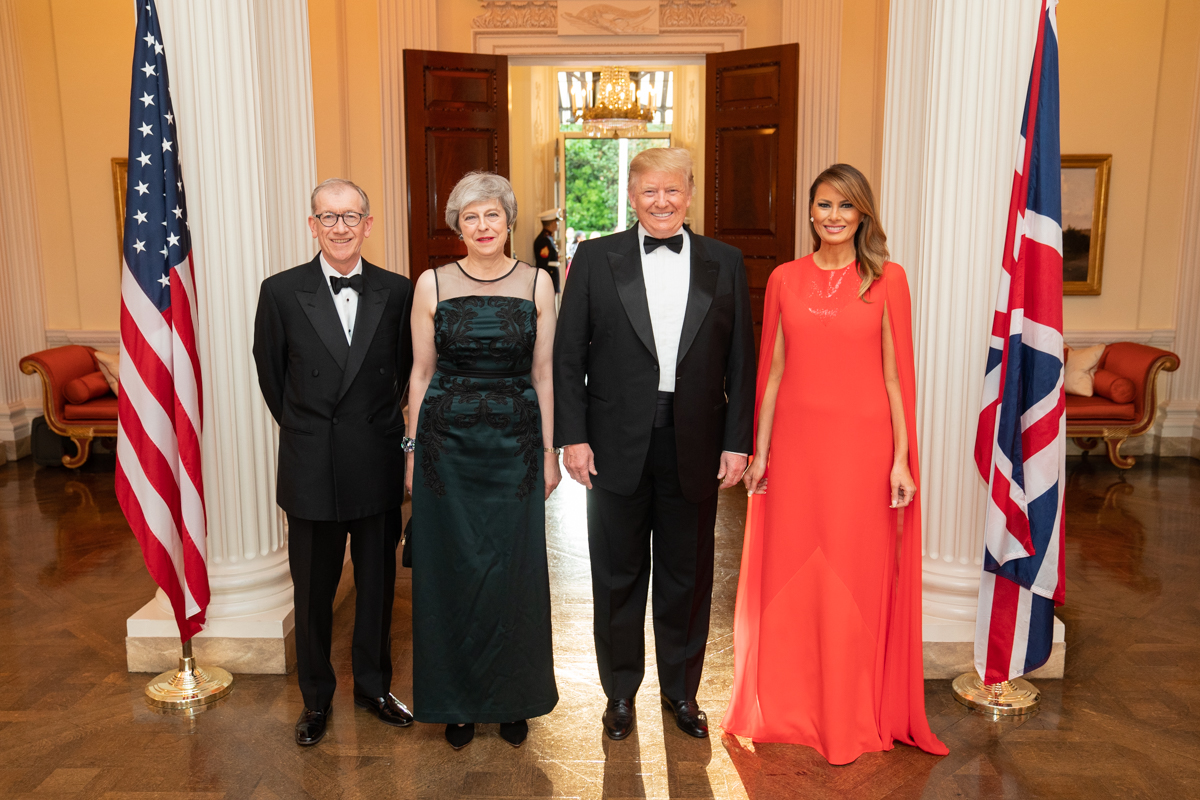
May (left) and PM Theresa May with President Donald Trump and First Lady Melania Trump at Winfield House in 2019

May briefly served as chairman of the Conservative Party Wimbledon constituency association before reportedly deciding to concentrate on a career in finance. Nonetheless he remained consistently active and enthusiastic as a Tory supporter, and often described as an "experienced Conservative activist". He was named in the Panama Papers in 2016.

May did not attend meetings to advise the Prime Minister in any official capacity but was referred to by some as the Prime Minister's 'most trusted adviser', following her consultation with him over calling the snap general election in 2017 and her 2016 Conservative Party Conference speech. He helped to canvass voters ahead of the 2017 Copeland by-election and supports his wife in her Maidenhead constituency affairs.

May made his first official visit as the British PM's spouse to the G20 summit in July 2017 in Hamburg, Germany. During the visit, he attended gala concerts and took boat trips with the spouses of other world leaders.

On 27 January 2019, The Sunday Times reported Theresa May's chief of staff Lord Barwell broke ranks to accuse Philip May of "scuppering" plans to offer the Labour Party a permanent customs union with the EU to try to push the withdrawal agreement through parliament. May is said to have encouraged his wife to seek changes to the deal by removing the Irish backstop, in order for it to be approved by parliament with the support of the DUP and Brexiteer MPs.

In July 2020, he was knighted in Boris Johnson's belated 2019 Dissolution Honours. He formally received the honour in October 2021 from the Prince of Wales.

== Personal life ==
May and his future wife, then Theresa Brasier, met as undergraduates at Oxford, being introduced by Benazir Bhutto at a Conservative Party student event. Theresa credits future Australian Prime Minister Malcolm Turnbull for encouraging Philip to propose to her. They further bonded over a shared love of cricket, and were married on 6 September 1980 by Theresa's father, Hubert Brasier.

As the spouse of the prime minister of the United Kingdom, May avoided giving interviews or making public statements but did accompany his wife for a joint interview on the BBC One programme The One Show prior to the 2017 general election. During this interview, Theresa May admitted her sadness, for health reasons, she and Philip have not been able to have children, saying: "You look at families all the time and you see there is something there that you don't have". Also in the interview, May said: "I get to decide when I take the bins out. Not if I take them out", and commented, "I do the traditional boy jobs by and large." Asked about the downside to being married to the Prime Minister, May insisted it was a privilege, saying: "If you're the kind of man who expects his tea to be on the table at six o'clock every evening, you could be a disappointed man."

== Arms ==
Coat of arms of Sir Philip May
Notes Son of Robert John May, who was granted Arms, Crest and Badge by Letters Patent of Garter and Norroy and Ulster dated 10 October 1997 Adopted 1997 Escutcheon Per fess vert and or three pallets between four roundels in bend counter-changed. Motto To thyself be true

Unofficial roles
Preceded by Samantha Cameron	Spouse of the Prime Minister of the United Kingdom; 2016–2019	Succeeded by Marina Wheeler; De jure
