= Liam Hourican =

Irish actor

- Occupations: Actor; stand-up comedian
- Years active: 2004–present
- Television: Murder in Successville
- Height: 5 ft 10 in (1.78 m)

Liam Hourican is an Irish actor and stand-up comedian. He has appeared in various comedy roles on television. Hourican is perhaps best known for his co-starring role in the 2015 BBC Three series Murder in Successville, where Hourican plays Gordon Ramsay and Simon Cowell. The semi-improvised comedy series, in which a celebrity guest must help DI Sleet solve a fictional crime, became a cult hit.

== Filmography ==
=== Television ===
- The IT Crowd (2010)
- Murder in Successville (2015–2017) - Various
- Penny Dreadful (2016)

=== Films ===
- Song of the Sea - Spud, Bus Driver
- The Secret of Kells
- Sarah Chong Is Going to Kill Herself (short film) - Not Gay Steven
- La Cha Cha
