= Whitington =

Whitington is an English surname. People with this name include:

- Whitington family, influential Australia family, several of whose members are mentioned below
- A. O. Whitington (1858–1919) South Australian horse racing official
- Craig Whitington (born 1970), English footballer, son of Eric
- Don Whitington (1911–1977), Australian political journalist and author
- Eric Whitington (born 1946), English footballer, father of Craig
- Ernest Whitington (1873–1934), South Australian journalist, pseudonym "Rufus"
- Fred T. Whitington (1853–1938), Anglican Archdeacon of Hobart, Tasmania
- Mitchel Whitington (born 1959), American author and paranormal researcher
- Richard Whitington (1912–1984), Australian cricketer and cricketing writer
- William Smallpeice Whitington (c. 1811–1887), progenitor of the Australian family

== See also ==
- Whittington (surname)
