= Whittington (surname) =

Whittington is an English surname. Notable people with the surname include:

- Amanda Whittington (born 1968), English playwright
- Andrew Whittington (tennis) (born 1993), Australian tennis player
- Arthur Whittington (1955–2024), American football player
- Bernard Whittington (born 1971), American football player
- Bert Whittington (1885–1969), Australian rules footballer
- Bill Whittington (1949–2021), American motor racing driver
- Buddy Whittington (born 1956), American guitarist
- C. L. Whittington (born 1952), American football player
- Clark Whittington, American artist
- Dale Whittington (1959–2003), American motor racing driver
- Don Whittington (born 1946), American motor racing driver
- Erik Whittington, American guitarist
- Eydie Whittington, American politician
- Greg Whittington (born 1993), American basketball player
- Harry Whittington (disambiguation), multiple people
- Harry B. Whittington (1916–2020), British palaeontologist
- Hulon B. Whittington (1921–1969), American soldier
- Jeff Whittington (1985–1999), New Zealand murder victim
- Jim Whittington (born 1941), American televangelist
- John Whittington, American screenwriter
- Jonathan Whittington (born 1973), British singer-songwriter
- Jordan Whittington (born 2000), American football player
- Khadijah Whittington (born 1986), American basketball player
- Lauren Whittington, American journalist
- Noah Whittington (born 2001), American football player
- Richard Whittington (disambiguation), multiple people
- Robert Whittington, 16th-century English grammarian
- Shayne Whittington (born 1991), American basketball player
- Stephen Whittington (born 1953), Australian composer, pianist, writer
- Sweet Dick Whittington (born 1934), American disc jockey
- William Madison Whittington (1878–1962), American politician

== See also ==
- Whitington, surname
