= James Marshall & Co. =

Department store in South Australia taken over by Myer in 1928

James Marshall & Co. was a department store in Adelaide, South Australia, which was taken over by Myer in 1928.

== History ==
The firm has its origin in a partnership between James Marshall (1845–1925 — see biography below), a Scots-born draper, and William Taylor (died 1913), accountant, who worked in different branches of the drapery business belonging to J. A. "Johnny" Northmore (died 1891). As Marshall & Taylor they opened a drapery business in December 1872 at 12 Hindley Street, a few doors from Beach's restaurant. In June 1875 they opened a second establishment, at 87 Rundle Street.

In 1879, the extensive business of John Hodgkiss & Co. came on the market. Both G. & R. Wills & Co. and D. & W. Murray were interested in the company's wholesale business, and agreed that whichever was successful, Marshall should take over the retail side. Accordingly, Marshall and Taylor, in company with Henry Thomas Fry and J. W. Porter, who were then warehousemen with G. & R. Wills, took over the extensive Hodgkiss premises at 26–28 Rundle Street and a warehouse around the corner on Stephens place, which became Marshall's furniture store and showrooms. They sold the old business at 12 Hindley and 87 Rundle streets to Hall & McLean. In 1881 they took over William Parkin's drapery store at 30 Rundle Street, which he had engaged his nephew J. W. Parkin to manage, but found the arrangement unsatisfactory. In March 1882 much of their stock was destroyed by fire which started in No. 26 but the buildings were repaired, and insurance covered Marshall's losses. The other premises seriously affected were those of Donaldson, Andrews, & Sharland at 18–24 Rundle Street. In 1883 or 1884 Fry left the partnership to concentrate on evangelical work, and in 1885 Frederick Allen Lakeman was persuaded to leave G. &. R. Wills as his replacement. Fry returned around 1888 and was re-admitted to the partnership; he lost his life in a horse carriage accident ten years later. In 1885 they leased the shop at 24 Rundle Street from Donaldson, Andrews, & Sharland, and in 1889 purchased it from R. C. Andrews, of that company. (Note: Donaldson, Andrews, & Sharland previously had the stretch of Rundle Street from No. 18 to 24, then after Andrews returned to England were left with one building at 22 Rundle Street. The company was purchased by a consortium of Cargeeg, Stone, Tod, and Crase in February 1891, and traded as Donaldson, Andrews & Co. continued trading well into the 20th century.)

In 1890 they had separate departments in each of four contiguous addresses: 24, 26, 28, and 30 Rundle Street, and a furniture warehouse on Stephens Place. They also had warehouses at 17 Fore Street and 20 Jewin Crescent, London, England.

The company also had properties on the east side of Stephens place and other large, quite separate, land holdings on North Terrace: one opposite the Adelaide Hospital, purchased from George Waterhouse, which was used as a bulk store and stables, and another opposite the Jubilee Exhibition Building, purchased from W. A. Horn, which they set up as a modern furniture and cabinet-making factory.

Their next acquisition was the two-storey building erected for the watchmaker and jeweller John Davis at No. 32. The upper floor had been successively used as a Masonic Hall, billiard room for the adjacent Globe Hotel, and finally Woodman's music and pianoforte salerooms, before becoming Marshall's millinery department, with china, earthenware and ironware on the ground floor. By 1900 the firm had seven partners: James Marshall, William Taylor, James Windmill Porter, Frederick Allen Lakeman, James Carlyle Marshall, Frederick Windmill Porter, and Arthur Roy Taylor, the last three being sons of the principals.

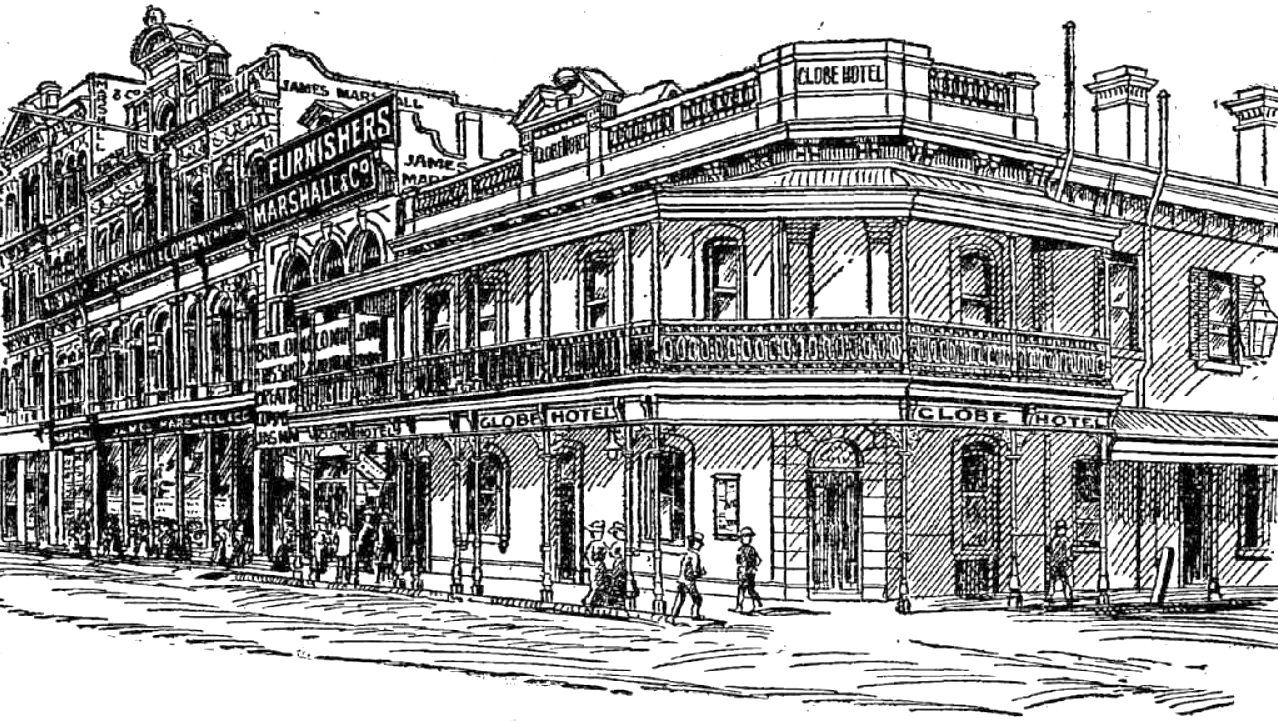
Globe Hotel, Adelaide, demolished 1907

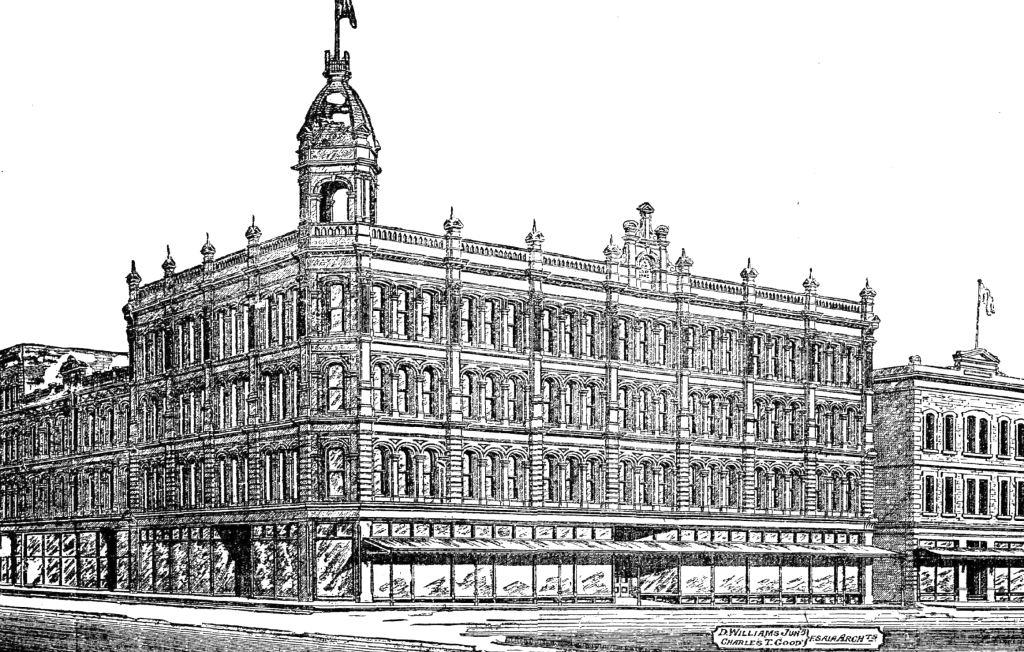
Architect's drawing, James Marshall's emporium

Next they purchased the Globe Hotel (Note: The "Globe" was, in the days of Aldridge and Blackler, the haunt of "sporting men" and home of Adelaide's "Tattersall Club".) on the Stephens Place corner, and an adjacent section which they had been leasing from the South Australian Company, so they had the whole western side of Stephens Place from Rundle Street to Verco Buildings. A condition of the sale stipulated that no move should be made on the building until the old licence ran out, on Christmas Day, 1907. In the meantime plans were drawn up for the future department store, and renovations were made to those buildings that would survive, to marry them into the future design, notably large matching plate-glass windows. The hotel and other buildings slated for destruction, notably the historic jeweller's building, were razed in the space of a few days.

In 1908 excavations began for a new 168 by 290 feet (51 m × 88 m) three storey department store designed by architects Williams & Good (Note: David Williams (1856-1940) and Charles T. Good (1863–1926)) on the 168 by 290 feet (51 m × 88 m) corner site, and builders Trudgen Brothers (Note: Nicholas Wallis Trudgen (30 April 1840 – 16 May 1892) building contractor and mayor of St Peters, arrived in South Australia from Cornwall in 1854, married Mary Ann Pitt on 14 May 1868 and had 6 sons and 2 daughters. Which formed Trudgen Brothers is not known. They completed several major contracts then quit the business.) with provision for another level. At the ground level plate-glass display windows stretched along Rundle street and down Stephens place for a total of 150 yards (140 m). The building's internal space was around one acre for each of four floors, and the idea of separate shops under one roof had been almost entirely left in the past, in favor of large uninterrupted expanses for best illumination and ventilation, connected by one large central staircase.

The properties that constituted "The Shopping Centre", as they began branding their building in 1906, were owned freehold by James Marshall & Company, with the notable exception of the site once occupied by Parkin's shop, for which they paid rent to the Parkin Trust. With 800 employees, they were the largest such business in the State, and among the half-dozen largest in Australia. The company enjoyed a good relationship with its employees, some of whom were tenaciously loyal: H. A. Lihou joined 1873 and was still with the company 52 years later in 1925, and H. Sweet was with them 46 years, and many others had passed the 25-year mark.

In September 1928 Myer Emporium Ltd. of Melbourne purchased 200,000 £1 ordinary shares in James Marshall & Co. Ltd, giving it a controlling interest in the firm. J. A. C. Marshall (chairman of directors); and F. A. Lakeman (director, who arrived in the State in 1878) retired and Donald Reid (see below) was appointed the first chairman of Myer Emporium (SA) Ltd.

=== James Marshall ===
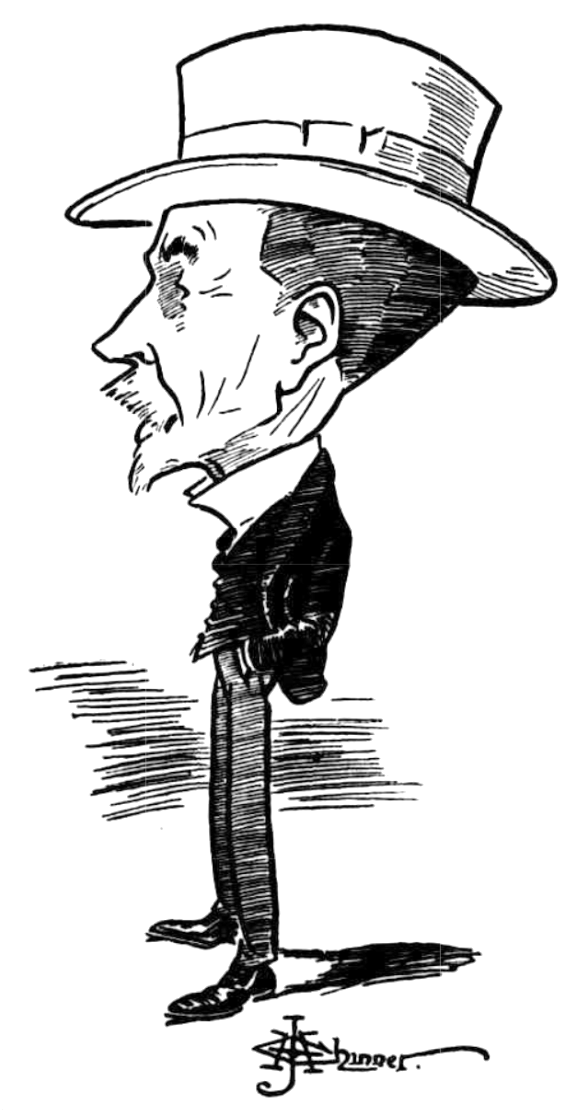
James Marshall, by J. H. Chinner

James Waddell (Note: He used this middle name when registering the birth of James in 1881; no later instance has been found.) Marshall (2 June 1845 – 10 March 1925) was born in Falkirk, Scotland, son of medical doctor William Marshall who died when he was young, and his mother Agnes Aitken Marshall, née Waddell, shortly after. He was educated at Falkirk, then apprenticed to P. & J(ohn) Gentleman, a Falkirk draper. He left for London, where he was employed by James Spence & Co., who had a shop in St. Paul's Churchyard. In 1866 he was recruited for the Adelaide drapery firm of J. A. "Johnny" Northmore (died 1891), possibly by William Murray of D. & W. Murray, who was in London from 1866. He arrived at Port Adelaide aboard the ship St Vincent in November 1867 and commenced work at Northmore's King William Street shop. He struck up a friendship with William Taylor (died 1913), of Northmore's Hindley Street store, and together set up in business in December 1872 as Marshall & Taylor at 12 Hindley Street, and in June 1875 a second establishment, at 87 Rundle Street.

He was never involved in politics or civic affairs, but was an active supporter of many charitable and patriotic causes: He was a board member of the:

- YMCA, Adelaide (of which he was a founder and at one time president). He purchased W. R. Fletcher's library to donate to the Association.
- Adelaide Children's Hospital
- Queen's Home at Rose Park, and served for many years as treasurer
- Adelaide Benevolent and Strangers' Friend Society
- Royal School for the Blind, Adelaide
- Home for Incurables
- Zoological and Acclimatisation Society
- Adelaide City Mission
- Lady Kintore Cottages

He was at different times a member of the Flinders Street Presbyterian Church and of the Kent Town Methodist Church. In his younger days he was an active participant in a variety of sports and later enthusiastically followed football, cricket, and tennis. He made around ten visits to England and several to America.

Marshall suffered from dyspepsia for 37 years, but did not let it interfere with his work or affect his bright and friendly demeanor. He was finally away from his office however for nine months, suffering from the illness that finally took his life.

==== Family ====
Marshall married Annie Walters (8 March 1846 – 27 April 1911), a cashier with Marshall & Taylor, on 24 September 1872. Their children were:

- Annie Marshall (1873– ) married Benjamin Hill Gillman (died 14 March 1945) in 1897. (Note: Ben Gillman and Norm Malcolm were friends, SPC boys, and members of the Modern Pickwick Club) They had four girls.
- Effie Agnes Marshall (28 January 1875 – 6 May 1913) married journalist Norman Maxwell Malcolm in 1901. There were no children.
- Rose Ethel Marshall (13 February 1877 – ) married Robert Laing in 1905
- Lily May Marshall (16 February 1879 – 5 October 1894)
- James Allan Carlyle Marshall (29 April 1881 – 19 August 1946) married Mary Elizabeth Osborn in 1909. He was owner of Mageppa station in the South-East of SA.
- Percy William Hardie Marshall (4 November 1883 – 4 July 1944) married Dulcie Barton Hack, granddaughter of John Barton Hack, in 1914. He was managing director of Eyes & Crowle.
- Doris Vera Marshall (7 November 1890 – )
- Jessie Gwendoline/Gwyndolyn Marshall (27 March 1896 – 18 May 1962) married Colin Gurner in 1918

He married again, to Florence Emma Stacy on 7 October 1913. They had a residence "Darroch House" built in Payneham in 1885. A later residence was on Victoria Avenue, Unley Park, and a (summer house) on Milan Terrace, Mount Lofty. He died at his Unley Park home and was buried in the Payneham Cemetery.

=== Frederick Allen Lakeman ===
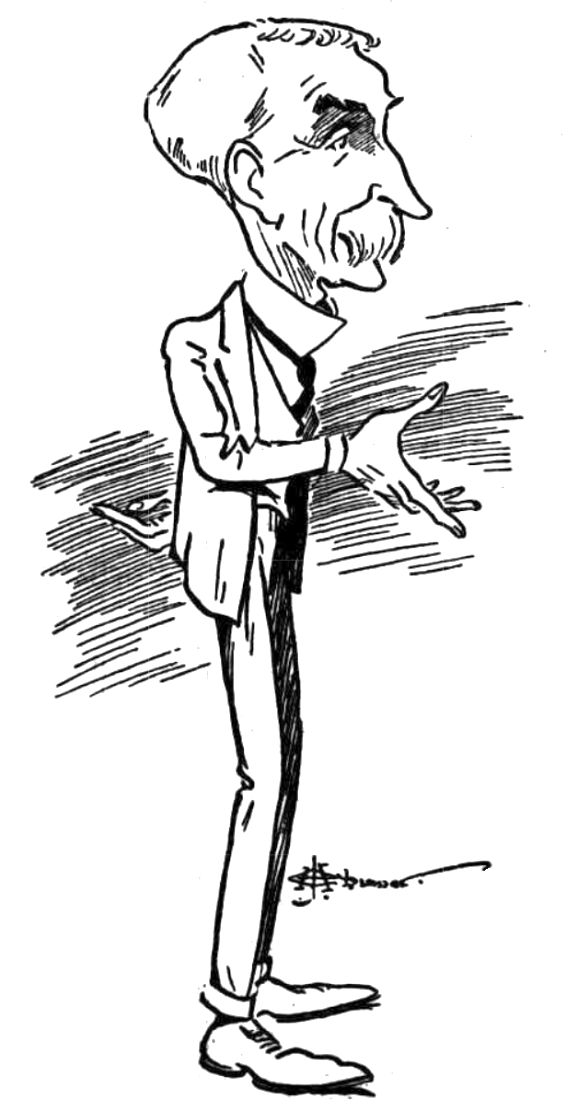
F. A. Lakeman, by J. H. Chinner

Frederick Allen Lakeman (c. 1855 – 1 May 1941), businessman and philanthropist, was born in Stoke Newington, London, and educated at Richmond, London, and afterwards at Winslow, Buckinghamshire. His father worked for a firm of wholesale milliners, which may account for Lakeman's first job being with Henry Smith, draper of Brixton Hill, followed by another drapery house at Clapham, and then the well-known firm of Hitchcox Williams of St Paul's Churchyard. He was brought out to South Australia by G. & R. Wills & Co., Ltd. in 1878, then in 1885 joined James Marshall & Co. as a partner and director of the company. He was elected chairman of directors following the death of James Marshall and retired from the board in September 1928 following the takeover by Myer Emporium.

He was known as a public benefactor in connection with:

- The Mission to Seamen at the Outer Harbor. He purchased a corrugated iron hut from the WWI army camp at Mitcham as a temporary meeting place for the organization, pending the erection of a permanent building, which he also funded (the Lakeman Institute was opened by the Governor in August 1929).

While on a trip to London he visited the parent organization and attended the opening of their new £54,000 hostel at Poplar, London. He also purchased three Russian bagatelle tables for the Outer Harbor Mission.

- In 1939 he made a gift of more than £3,000 to 64 long-serving employees of James Marshall and Co., with no regard to their position, in appreciation for their loyalty and long association with the company.
- He provided funds for the establishment of Travellers' Aid cottages in North Adelaide.
- He left £10,000 to St Peter's Cathedral for a peal of bells. Nothing could be done during the War, but an order was placed with John Taylor & Co., bell founders of Loughborough, Leicestershire England for a peal of eight bells, including a two-ton tenor bell, 5 feet (1.5 m) in diameter, on which was engraved an inscription in Latin translated as "Frederick Allen Lakeman gave me and my brothers for the praise of the Father the Son and the Holy Ghost AD 1941". Regarded as the finest in Australia, they constituted the only true peal in Adelaide; those in the Adelaide Town Hall, St Augustine's, Unley and St Andrews, Walkerville being classed as carillons.

Lakeman never married and had no children. He had a home at 34 Brougham Place, North Adelaide, where he had several valuable pictures, one by Mary Elwell, being noteworthy. He died in a private hospital at North Adelaide and his remains were interred in the North Road Cemetery following a service at the Cathedral conducted by the Dean of Adelaide, Dean Jose.

=== Donald Reid ===
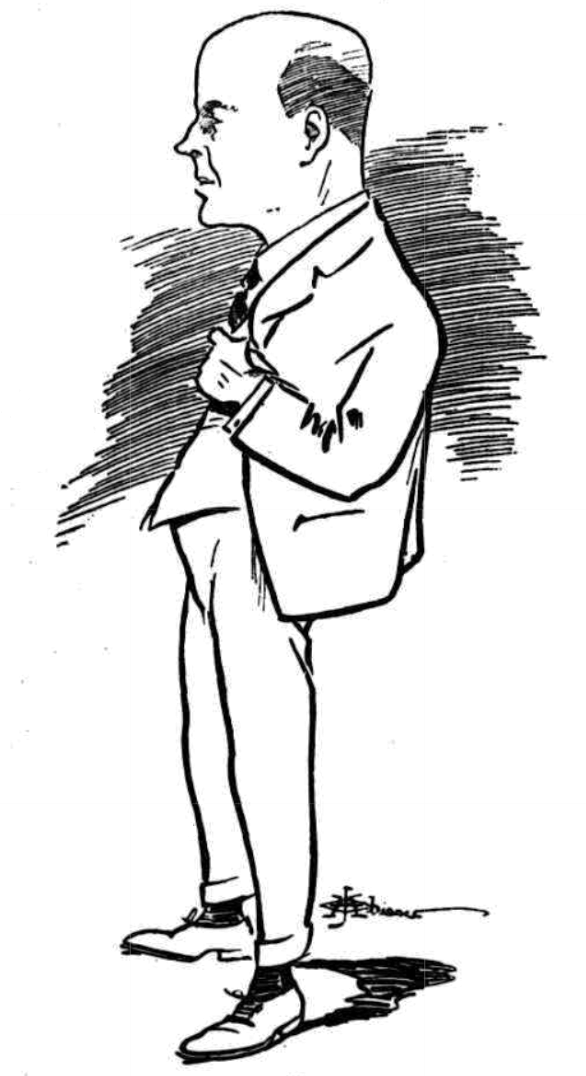
Donald Reid, by J. H. Chinner

Reid (c. 1884–??) was the second son of John Wishart Reid (c. 1853 – 26 April 1938) and Edith Reid, née Gibbons (c. 1862 – 18 June 1922) married 1880, of Goolwa.

J. W. Reid of Orkney arrived in Adelaide on the Scottish Lassie January 1878 to work for his uncles John and William Wishart, who had a considerable business building wharves and bridges in South Australia, Western Australia and the Northern Territory.

He started around 1899 as an office boy in James Marshall & Co.'s furniture warehouse, leaving their employ in 1906 to manage the A.M.C. Stores in Kadina. Four years later he succeeded Roy Taylor as manager of Marshall & Co.'s furniture warehouse, and in 1920 he was appointed general manager. Five years later he had a seat on the board of directors, then (around 1928?) he was made managing director. He was appointed general manager of Myer's Adelaide in September 1928, then – left for Melbourne.

Reid married Florence Selwood of Kadina on 12 May 1910. They had a son Donald Gordon Wishart Reid in 1912.

Before moving to Melbourne they had a home 'Stronsay' at 107 Alexandra Terrace, Toorak. His property on Tasman Terrace, Port Lincoln, known as 'The Castle' was sold to builder Stanley Rosewarne of Kadina.

== See also ==
- John Martin's
- Charles Birks & Company
- Charles Moore & Company
- Harris Scarfe
