= Benjamin H. Gillman =

Australian railway official

Benjamin Hill Gillman (19 February 1870 – 14 March 1945) was a traffic manager of South Australian Railways.

== Career ==
Gillman was born at Gilberton, South Australia to Customs official Thomas Sherlock Gillman (31 March 1843 – 24 January 1926) and Elizabeth Gillman, née Skinner, (c. 1850 – 27 September 1921).

Gillman was educated at the Model School on Sturt Street, where he was an exhibition-winning student in 1883 transferring to St Peter's College, where he was one of their best all-round athletes and a popular participant in amateur theatricals. He matriculated in 1886 with honours in mathematics and won the McCulloch Exhibition in Science. He did not proceed to university, but in 1887 joined the South Australian Railways department as a cadet.

He was, in 1908, a founder of the Railway Officers' Association, and its first president. John Newland MP, an ex-railways employee, had a vital part in its formation, and acted as its first secretary.

In June 1924 he was selected by Chief Railways Commissioner Webb to accompany Divisional Superintendent C. B. Anderson on a mission to England and America, to investigate the latest ideas in railway management. On their return, he gave public lectures on his findings.

He was, in 1925, the first director of the Railways Institute, created as a social and educational arm of the Railways Department, (Note: This was not an unusual institution, the Postmaster General's Department, which was responsible for postal and telecommunications across Australia, founded the Postal Institute for the benefit of its employees years earlier — Victoria in 1916 and the other States in 1917.) effectively side-lining a man described in parliament as "one of the most competent officers in the Railways Department".

He held that post until 1932, when he succeeded A. N. Day as traffic manager. He retired in August 1935.

He died at his home at Second avenue Royston Park, South Australia.

== Other interests ==
In 1891 Gillman and another Railways employee, James Wardlaw Gordon, founded the Modern Pickwick Club, an exclusive association of bachelors "for the intellectual and social improvement of members". Gillman and his friend Norman Malcolm, also a "Modern Pickwickian", married daughters of James Marshall, thereby exempting themselves from membership.

Gillman was involved in amateur theatre, an actor with Adelaide's Garrick Dramatic Club.

Gillman served as chairman of the State Unemployment Relief Council and the Commonwealth Employment Council, for some years. He was vice-president of the Royal Society of St George, and in 1937–1938 president of the Commonwealth Club, Adelaide. He was president of the Church of England Boys' Home at the time of his death.

== Family ==
Gillman married Annie Marshall (1874 – 31 May 1944) on 17 March 1897, at age 27. Annie was the eldest daughter of merchant James Marshall. Gillman's journalist friend (and fellow Modern Pickwick Club member) Norman Malcolm married Annie Marshall's sister Effie Marshall in 1901.

Their four sons include:

- Sherlock Hill Marshall Gillman (1898 – 8 February 1925) died in Los Angeles
- Bryan James Marshall Gillman (1903–1980) married Olive Amy Luff sometime after 1930; lived Royston Park
- Ralph Carlyle Marshall "Peter" Gillman (1907–1983) married Esther McMillan on 10 February 1934
