= Andrew Maunsell =

British bibliographer and publisher

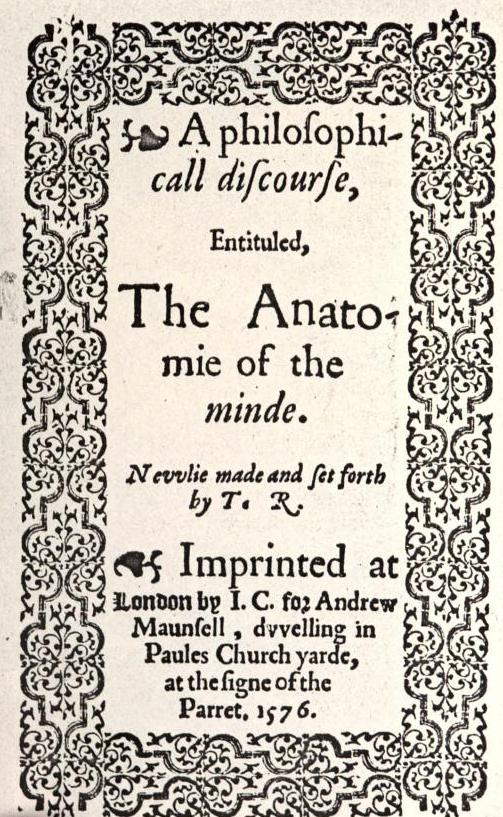
- Anatomie of the Minde
- Died: 1595
- Occupations: Bibliographer and publisher

Andrew Maunsell (died 1595) was an English bibliographer and publisher.

== Biography ==
Maunsell was at the beginning of Elizabeth's reign probably a member of the Drapers' or Grocers' Company, but as early as 1578 he undertook, in addition to his other business, the publication and sale of books, although he did not join the Stationers' Company (Arber, Stationers' Reg. ii. 28). On 6 November 1578, he obtained a license to publish a work entitled, ‘The State of Swearinge and Swearers’ (ib. p. 340), and until 1595 he was busily occupied in selling or publishing books, chiefly theological (cf. ib. pp. 381, 402). In 1583 he joined with H. Denham, T. Chard, and W. Broome, in bringing out in folio a translation by Anthony Martin of Peter Martyr's ‘Commonplaces,’ and he undertook the publication of many works by Archbishop Bancroft's well-known chaplain, Thomas Rogers. He at first dwelt at the sign of the Parrot in St. Paul's Churchyard, but by 1595 had removed to Lothbury. His device was a pelican with its offspring, rising out of the flames, which was formerly employed by Richard Jugge, and his motto was ‘Pro lege, rege, grege.’ He took a genuine interest in his profession, and finding the need of a general catalogue of English printed books, set about preparing one. Nothing quite similar had been previously attempted in England, although Bale had made efforts in the direction in his ‘Scriptores.’ Maunsell designed a catalogue in three parts, the first embracing divinity, the second, science in all its branches with music, and the third, literature, including logic, law, and history. The entries were arranged under authors' surnames, but many general headings, like ‘Sermons’ or ‘Music,’ were introduced, and gave the work something of the character of a subject-index. The first two parts were alone completed, and both appeared in folio in 1595. The first part, entered on the ‘Stationers' Register’ 8 May 1595, was entitled ‘The First Part of the Catalogue of English Printed Bookes: which concerneth such Matters of Divinite as have bin either written in oure Tongue or translated out of some other Language, and have bin published to the Glory of God and Edification of the Church of Christ in England. Gathered into Alphabet and suche Method as it is by Andrew Maunsell … London, printed by John Windet for Andrew Maunsell,’ fol. This is dedicated to Queen Elizabeth, and there follow the dedication addresses to the members of the Stationers' Company, and to ‘the reverend divines and lovers of divine books.’ Maunsell warns the latter that he has omitted the works ‘of fugitive papistes’ or printed attacks on the existing government. Both defects are supplied in manuscript by a contemporary in a copy of the catalogue in Trinity College Library, Cambridge. The continuation of the catalogue was called ‘The Seconde Parte of the Catalogue of English printed Bookes eyther Written in oure own Tongue or translated out of any other Language: which concerneth the Sciences Mathematicall, as Arithmeticke, Geometrie, Astronomie, Astrologie, Musick, the Arte of Warre and Nauigation, And also of Physick and Surgerie, London, by James Roberts, for Andrew Maunsell,’ 1595. The dedication, addressed to Robert Devereux, second earl of Essex, is signed ‘Andrew Maunsell, Bookseller,’ and there follow letters to the ‘professors’ of mathematics and physic, and to the Stationers' Company and booksellers in general. Francis Meres makes familiar reference to Maunsel's catalogue’ in his ‘Palladis Tamia,’ 1598. The promised third part failed to appear, probably owing to Maunsell's death late in 1595. The ‘Catalogue’ of William London of 1658 ultimately superseded Maunsell's labours.

Another Andrew Maunsell or Mansell, apparently the elder Maunsell's son, was admitted to the freedom of the Stationers' Company on 6 Dec. 1613 (Arber, iii. 684), and on 4 May 1614 obtained a license to publish ‘A Fooles Bolt is soone Shot.’
