= Ruby Romaine =

- Tracey Takes On... character
- First appearance: "Tracey Takes On...Charity"
- Last appearance: Tracey Ullman in the Trailer Tales
- Created by: Tracey Ullman
- Portrayed by: Tracey Ullman

In-universe information
- Nicknames: Rube; Little Girl Friday
- Gender: Female
- Occupation: Make-up artist
- Family: Rosco (Uncle); Shep (Uncle; also Buddy's father)
- Spouse: Tubby Lapels (Divorced)
- Significant other: Senator Joe McCarthy (briefly)
- Children: Buddy Romaine; Desirée Romaine
- Relatives: Karen (Granddaughter); Wayne (Grandson); Whitney (Great-granddaughter)
- Nationality: American

Ruby Romaine is a fictional character portrayed by Tracey Ullman on her show Tracey Takes On... The character became so popular that HBO greenlit a pilot for a potential Ruby Romaine spin-off series, ultimately resulting in the one-off television special Tracey Ullman in the Trailer Tales in 2003. Ruby is a self-proclaimed "star maker". Ullman has repeatedly referred to Ruby Romaine as her favorite character.

== Biography ==
Septuagenarian Ruby Romaine's family originally hails from Wisconsin. When her family moved to California they lived in a trailer. Her parents were extremely obese: "I don't think I ever saw them put anything in their mouths that didn't have milk, butter, and cheese in it." Ruby's space in the trailer was whatever was left over after they sat down. Ruby says that she was an early bloomer: "I had hair in all four locations and bazongas like two torpedos." Sometime before the age of fifteen, her uncle Rosco lost his job as a mule skinner and came to live with her family. Rosco made sexual advances towards her, for which he stood trial. The judge made him join the navy and sent him to Guam where he died. "God rest his sweaty paws," says Ruby. According to the 1998 book Tracey Takes On, Ruby had a short-lived marriage to entertainer Tubby Lapels, chairman emeritus of the Hermosa Beach Friars Club, which produced her daughter Desirée (Melinda Dillon). However, according to the Tracey Takes On... episode "America", Desirée was actually the product of a secret love affair with then-Senator Joseph McCarthy. "He was the first guy I did it with in a blimp," reveals Ruby.

Aside from Desirée, Ruby also has a son, Buddy. He was the product of an incestuous affair that she had with her uncle Shep. Buddy didn't meet his "uncle daddy" until he was an adult. As a child, Buddy appeared as the "Tasty Bread Boy" in television commercials. When he was 17, he decided that he wanted to fight in the Vietnam War. He returned shell-shocked. He lives with Ruby to this very day. Despite his harrowing experience, Buddy still misses Vietnam. To fill the void, he adopted a Vietnamese Pot-bellied, Oinky. Ruby makes sure that Buddy takes his antipsychotic medication daily, although he seemingly has lapses. Ruby gave birth to both her children six months apart. She explains, "That way I could spend a lot of time with them and make sure that they were growing up right." Desirée steals things from the morgue where she works, and Buddy frequently runs around the neighborhood in Ruby's bathroom screaming, "Stop the noise! Stop the noise!"

Ruby currently resides in East Hollywood, Los Angeles, California. Her makeup career began when the film Pirate of the Plains, starring actor Errol Flynn, began filming in her town. Flynn took a liking to an underage Ruby and slept with her. Ruby, threatening to go public with the affair, was offered a job doing makeup on the film, thus kickstarting her makeup career. She is the oldest working member of the Make-Up Artists and Hair Stylists Guild. "I've been working here fifty years—hell, I'm almost out of rouge!" Ruby chooses to make her makeup the old-fashioned way, in a blender. She has over 720 film and television shows to her credit.

Some of the famous faces Ruby's made up include Barbara Eden, Bette Davis, Clark Gable, Debbie Reynolds, Debra Paget and Dennis Weaver (in Seven Angry Men, they didn't have the budget for twelve), Humphrey Bogart, Jane Kaczmarek, Jane Seymour, Jane Wyman (who never said more than a few words to her), Katharine Hepburn, Kirk Douglas, Maureen O'Hara, Mickey Rooney, Ronald Reagan (for his Chesterfield cigarette ads), Rose Marie, Spencer Tracy, the cast of Bonanza, and Candice Bergen. She also worked personally for actress Joan Crawford. Ruby explains, "My job was to draw her eyebrows in five minutes before the alarm went off." Ruby was fired from the film The Greatest Story Ever Told (which was the closet thing she ever had to a religious experience) after actress Angela Lansbury accused her of drinking some of the wine meant for the Last Supper scene.

Ruby has also done makeup for the pornographic film industry. Her work can be seen in the period film, Plymouth Cock. "I never needed a 'beaver brush' when I worked with Minnelli!"

Ruby has had numerous affairs with Hollywood actors. The list includes Anthony Quinn, Cornel Wilde, Lawrence Welk, and Robert Mitchum. Ruby swears that when she worked on the film Magnificent Obsession with actor Rock Hudson, he was "all hands".

She's only been arrested once in her life. "It was on one of those low-budget shows. It was all about people turning into rats." A half-pound of cocaine was found in the hair and makeup trailer, and Ruby and another woman were taken in for questioning. She was innocent, but years prior she did let a gaffer rub some on one of her nipples and lick it off. "He got a bigger kick out of it than I did. That's for sure."

Ruby began smoking as early as 7 years old. She has what many would describe as an alcohol problem, but she would never admit it. She sometimes refers to alcohol as "medication", or a purifier. She's also not one to refrain from mixing alcohol with medication. Ruby hates missing Happy Hour at Smog Cutters, a dive bar in Silver Lake, which she frequently drives to in her blue Buick. She enjoys champagne music and wine tasting. Ruby is known to call into The Family Spending Channel, a home shopping channel, when she's had "a few too many".

Ruby only gets mammograms to ensure that she doesn't get dropped from her union's health insurance program. Ruby has had a hysterectomy.

When work slows down, Ruby relies on her Social Security check, Buddy's disability check, her union pension, and food stamps to get by.

== Celebrities Ruby claims to have worked with ==
- Lauren Bacall
- Candice Bergen
- Elizabeth Berkley
- Vivian Biltmore (Note: Fictional.)
- Humphrey Bogart
- Joan Crawford
- Tony Curtis
- Bette Davis
- Alicia del Mar
- Phyllis Diller
- Kirk Douglas
- Barbara Eden
- Errol Flynn
- Clark Gable
- John Garfield
- Linda Granger
- Katharine Hepburn
- Huell Howser
- Rock Hudson
- Jane Kaczmarek
- Pepper Kane
- Grace Kelly
- Hedy Lamarr
- Angela Lansbury
- Jayne Mansfield
- Rose Marie
- Ray Milland
- Vincente Minnelli
- Nick Nolte
- Maureen O'Hara
- Debra Paget
- Ronald Reagan
- Debbie Reynolds
- Burt Reynolds
- Mickey Rooney
- George Schlatter
- Jane Seymour
- Frank Sinatra
- Spencer Tracy
- Lana Turner
- Dennis Weaver
- Jane Wyman

=== Celebrities Ruby claims to have had affairs with ===
- Errol Flynn
- John Garfield
- Lorne Greene
- John Edgar Hoover
- Joseph McCarthy
- Robert Mitchum
- Anthony Quinn
- Lawrence Welk
- Cornel Wilde

== Filmography ==
The following is a partial list of real or non-fictionalized films and television show titles

- Algiers (1938)
- The Lost Weekend (1945)
- The Razor's Edge (1946) (Note: Revealed in a deleted sketch for the Tracey Takes On... episode "Romance".)
- Mogambo (1953)
- Magnificent Obsession (1954)
- The Vikings (1955)
- Trapeze (1956)
- Bonanza (1959–1973)
- Breakfast at Tiffany's (1961)
- The Greatest Story Ever Told (1965)
- Smokey and the Bandit (1971)
- Showgirls (1995)
- Six Days, Seven Nights (1998)

The following is a partial list of fictional films and television show titles (years unknown)

- The Bush Pilot
- Faded Splendor
- Seven Angry Men
- Plymouth Cock
- V.I.P. Lounge
- Desert Nights
- Vegas Vixens
- Turd Pile

== Character origins ==
Tracey Ullman describes Romaine as "pure Hollywood white trash". She was based on many of the Hollywood union makeup artists sent to make her up over the years. Romaine's look was inspired by Romaine Greene, a hairstylist who worked on many of Woody Allen's films. The voice was inspired by Florence Aadland, mother to actress Beverly Aadland, who at 15 had an affair with the then 48-year-old Errol Flynn. Ullman played Florence in the 1991 one-woman Broadway show The Big Love, based on the 1961 book of the same name. She spent hours listening to audio recordings of Florence dictating her memoirs to writer Tedd Thomey. There are parallels between Ruby Romaine's early days in Hollywood and those of Beverly Aadland, specifically Aadland's affair with Errol Flynn.

== See also ==
- Tracey Takes On...
- Tracey Ullman in the Trailer Tales
- Tracey Ullman: Live and Exposed
- Tracey Takes On

== Bibliography ==
- Ullman, Tracey (1998). Tracey Takes On. Hyperion. ISBN 978-0-786-86340-2.
