= History of bookselling =

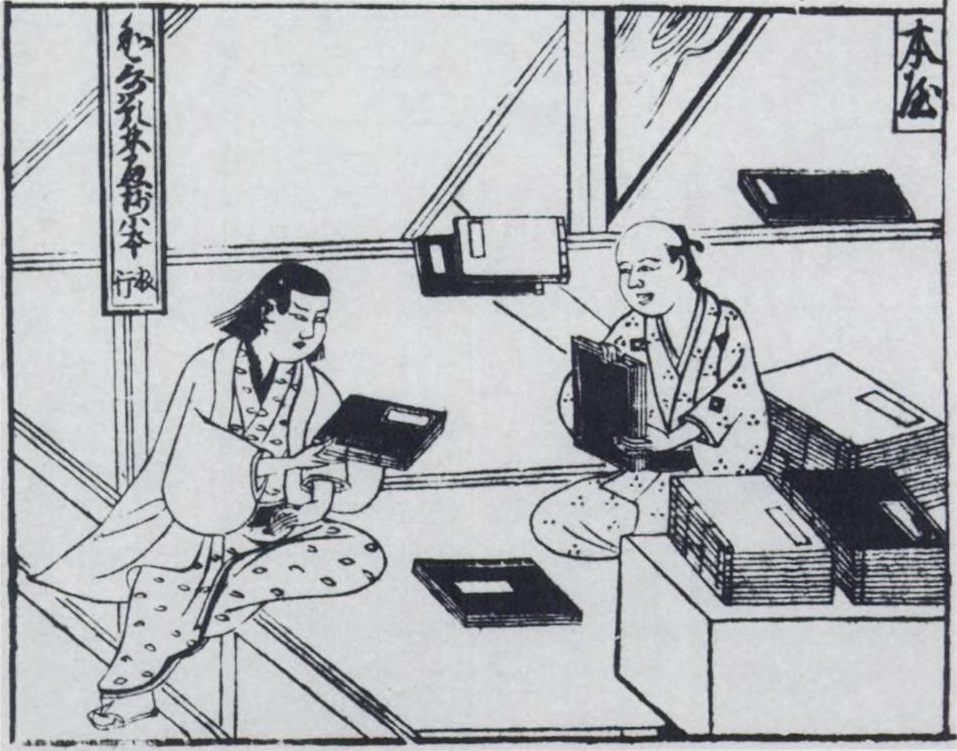
Japanese bookseller from the Jinrin kinmo zui (An Illustrated Encyclopedia of Humanity) from 1690

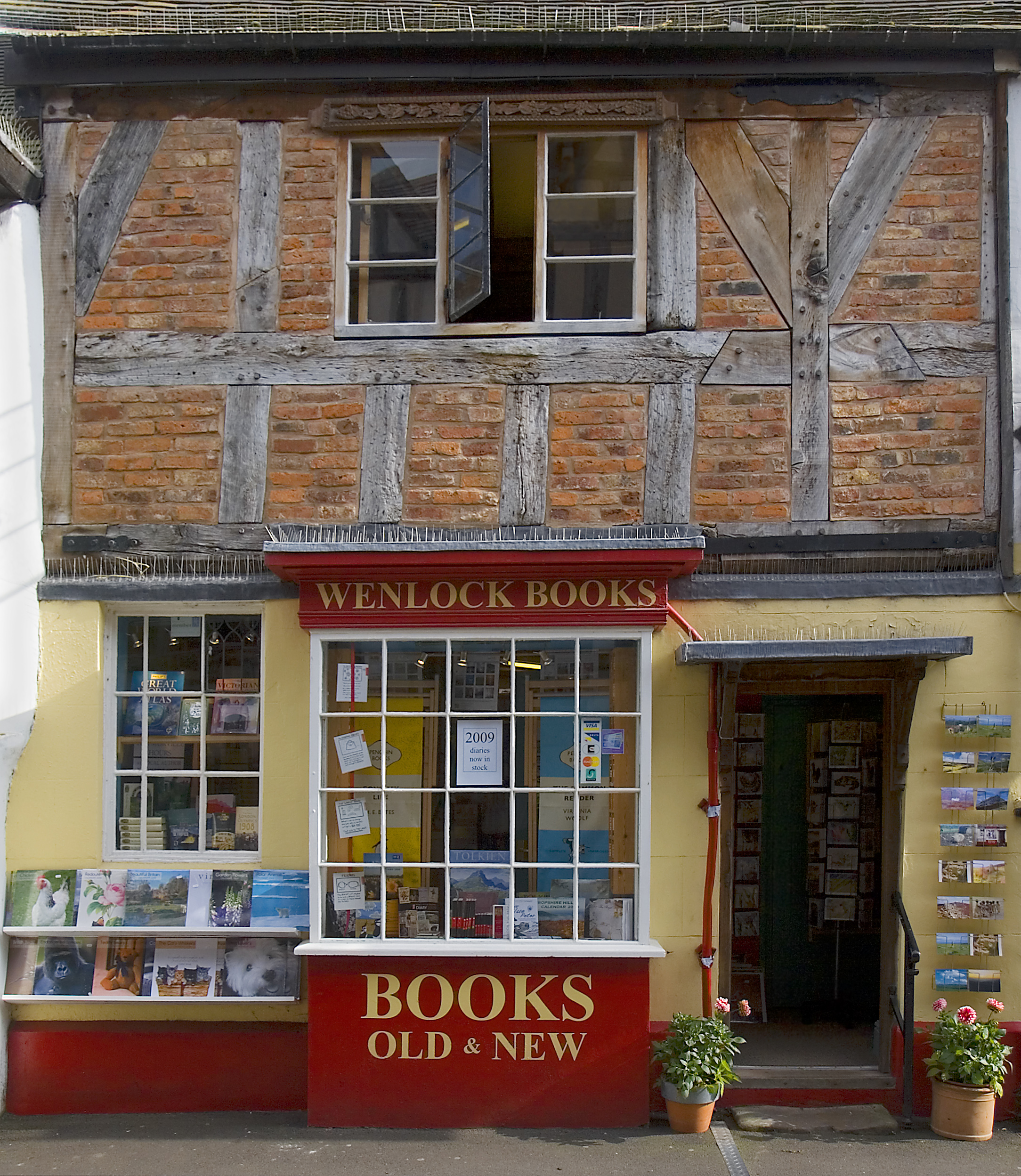
Bookshop in Much Wenlock, UK.

The selling of books dates back to ancient times. The founding of libraries in c.300 BC stimulated the energies of the Athenian booksellers. In Rome, toward the end of the republic, it became the fashion to have a library, and Roman booksellers carried on a flourishing trade.

== Greek and Roman booksellers ==
In the book of Jeremiah the prophet is represented as dictating to Baruch the scribe, who described the mode in which his book was written. These scribes were the earliest booksellers, and supplied copies as they were demanded. Aristotle possessed a somewhat extensive library, and Plato is recorded to have paid the large sum of one hundred minae for three small treatises of Philolaus the Pythagorean. When the Alexandrian library was founded about 300 BC, various expedients were used for the purpose of procuring books, and this appears to have stimulated the energies of the Athenian booksellers. In Rome, toward the end of the republic, it became the fashion to have a library as part of the household furniture. Roman booksellers carried on a flourishing trade. Their shops (taberna librarii) were chiefly in the Argiletum, and in the Vicus Sandalarius. On the door, or on the side posts, was a list of the books on sale; and Martial, who mentions this also, says that a copy of his First Book of Epigrams might be purchased for five denarii. In the time of Augustus the great booksellers were the Sosii. According to Justinian, a law was passed granting to the scribes the ownership of the material written; this may be the beginnings of the modern law of copyright.

== Islamic bookshops ==
Abbasid Caliphate in the east and Caliphate of Córdoba in the west, encouraged the development of bookshops, copyists, and book dealers across the entire Muslim world, in Islāmic cities such as Damascus, Baghdad, and Córdoba. According to Encyclopædia Britannica:

Scholars and students spent many hours in these bookshop schools reading, examining, and studying available books or purchasing favourite selections for their private libraries. Book dealers traveled to famous bookstores in search of rare manuscripts for purchase and resale to collectors and scholars and thus contributed to the spread of learning. Many such manuscripts found their way to private libraries of famous Muslim scholars such as Avicenna, al-Ghazālī, and al-Fārābī, who in turn made their homes centres of scholarly pursuits for their favourite students.

There is a popular turn of phrase from the 1960s, "Books are written in Cairo, published in Beirut, and read in Baghdad". One of the most famous and prestigious Arab publishers is Dar al-Asab.

== French booksellers ==
The first wave of French booksellers came soon after Johannes Gutenberg introduced his new printing technologies in Europe. The oldest known bookstore still opened in France (and Europe) is the Librairie Nouvelle d'Orléans. Its owner in 1545 was Étienne Rouzeau, it now belongs to publisher Albin Michel.

The Book-Hunter in Paris by Octave Uzanne explores second hand and used booksellers and stalls in Paris during the late 19th century.

The Société typographique de Neuchâtel sales representative, Jean-François Favarger, made several tours of France and Switzerland, selling books and negotiating deals with booksellers in 1775–1776.

In 1810 Napoleon created a system by which, a would-be bookseller had to apply for a license (brevet), and supply four references testifying to his morality, and four confirmations of his professional ability to perform the job. All references had to be certified by the local mayor. If the application was accepted, the bookseller would have to swear an oath of loyalty to the régime. The application process was conducted to ensure that the new bookstore was not a place that distributed rebellious publications. The brevet process continued until 1870.

== Christianity ==
The spread of Christianity naturally created a great demand for copies of the Gospels, other sacred books, and later on for missals and other devotional volumes for both church and private use. Before the Reformation and the introduction of printing, scribes and stationers who sold books formed guilds. Some of these stationers had stations built against the walls of cathedrals. Besides the sworn stationers there were many booksellers in Oxford who were not sworn; for one of the statutes, passed in 1373, expressly states that, in consequence of their presence,

[B]ooks of great value are sold and carried away from Oxford, the owners of them are cheated, and the sworn stationers are deprived of their lawful business. It was, therefore, enacted that no bookseller except two sworn stationers or their deputies, should sell any book being either his own property or that of another, exceeding half a mark in value, under a pain of imprisonment, or, if the offence was repeated, of forfeiting his trade within the university.

== Modern bookselling ==
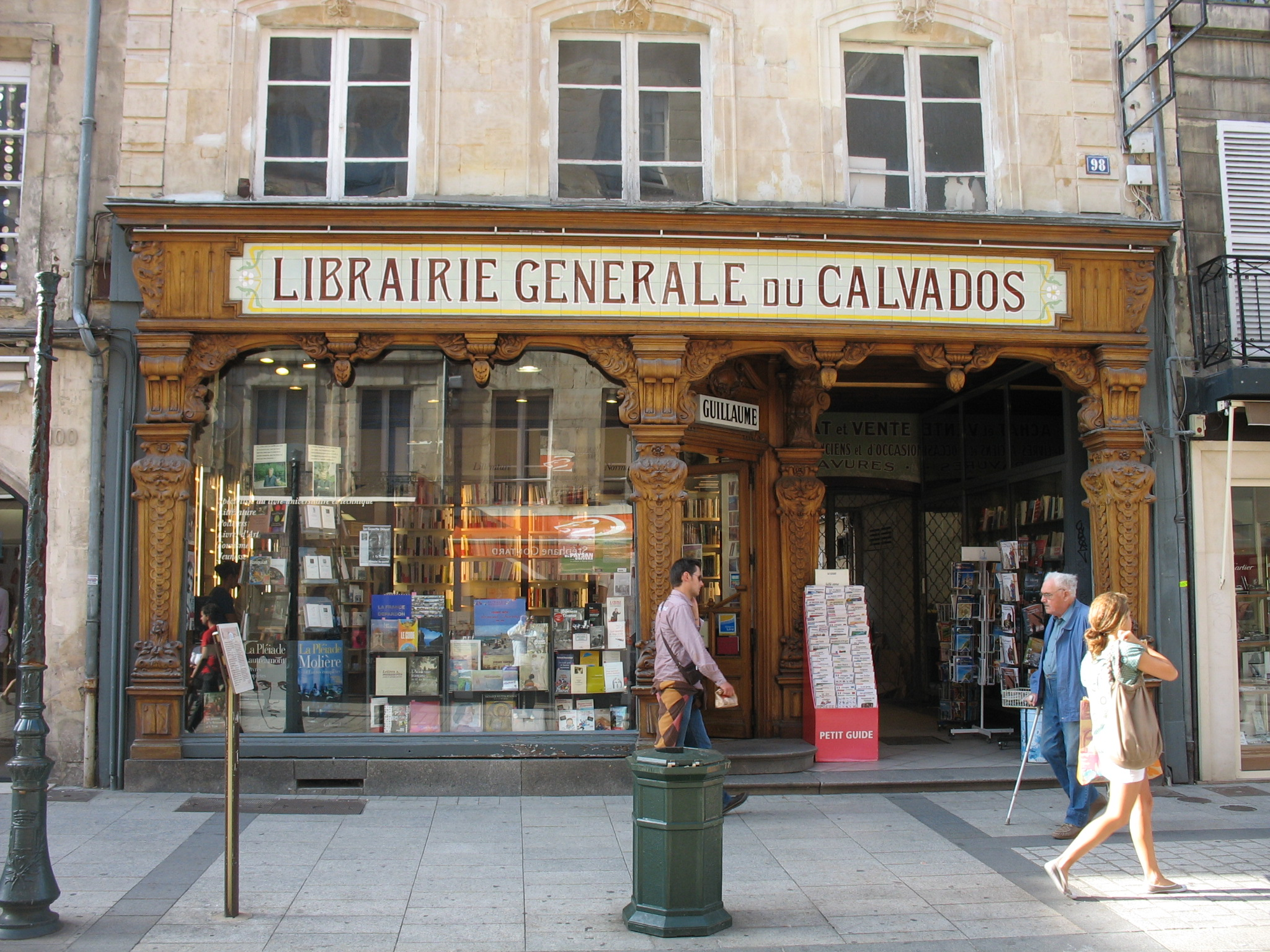
Bookstore in France

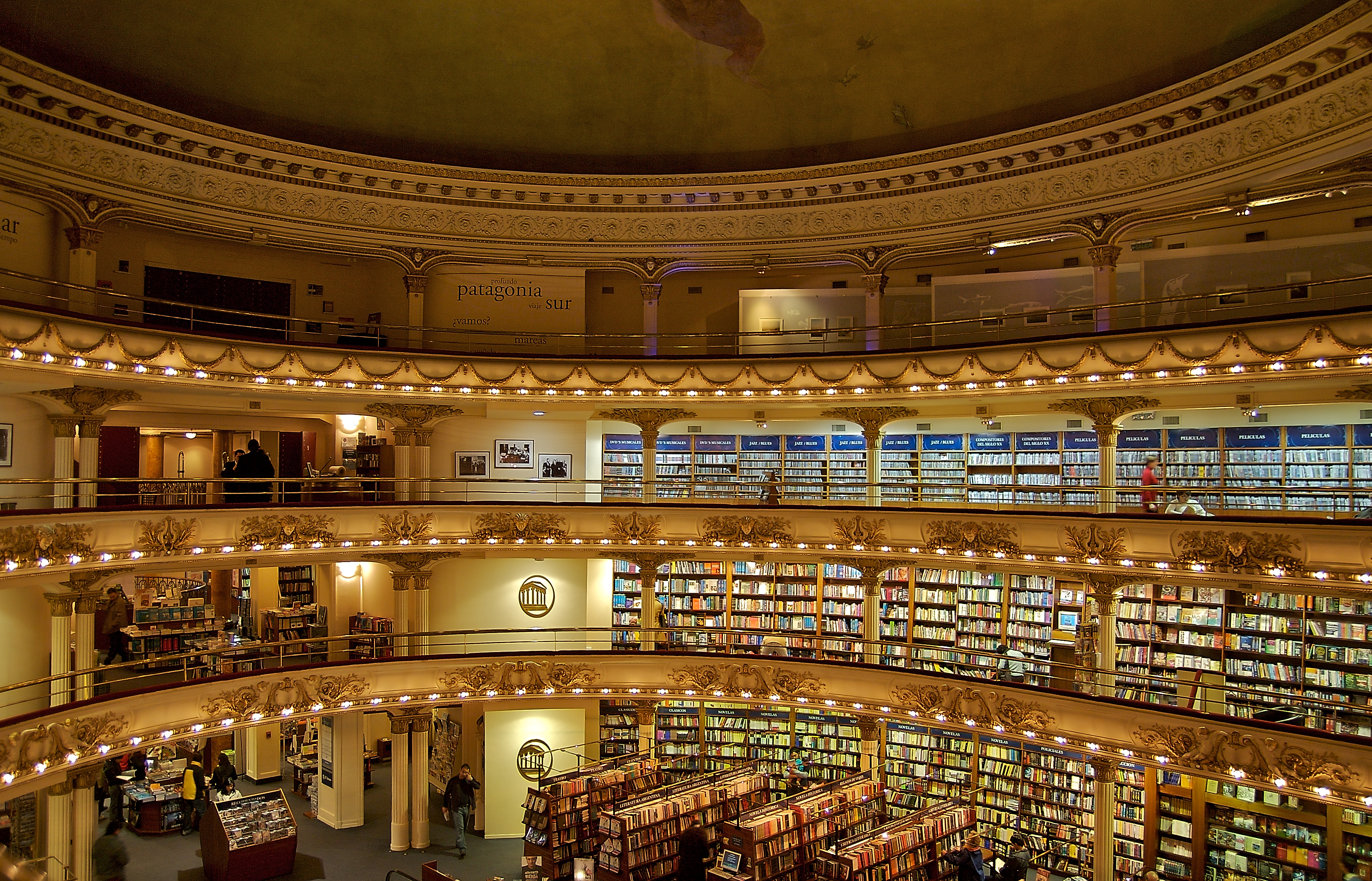
El Ateneo Grand Splendid bookstore in Buenos Aires, Argentina

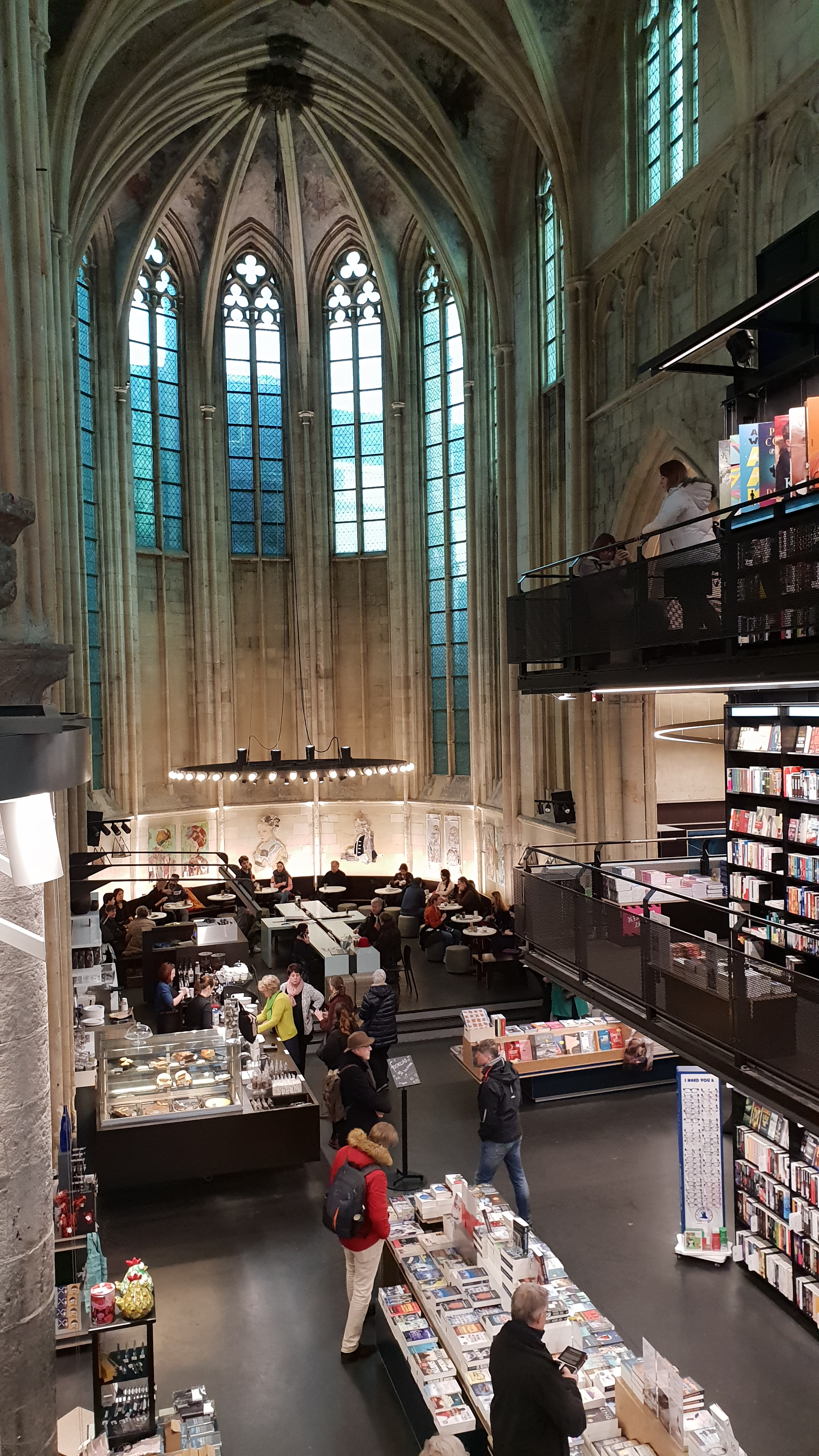
13th century Dominican church converted into a bookstore in Maastricht, the Netherlands

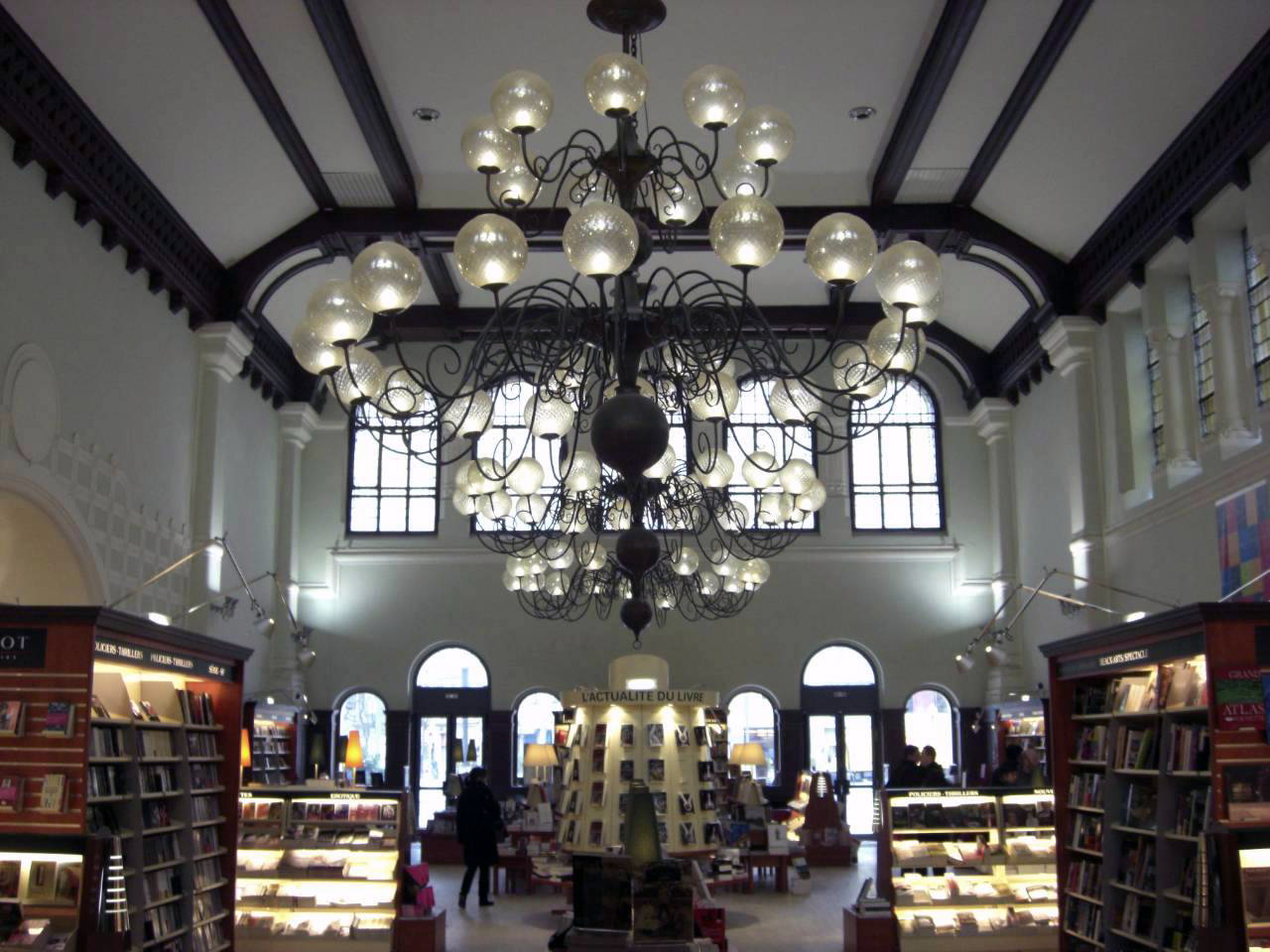
In many parts of the world, bookstores—like this one in the train station in Metz, France—are often found in transport facilities.

The modern system of bookselling dates from soon after the introduction of printing. Through the new mechanized process for printing, books became more affordable. By the nineteenth century, the model of bookselling as we know it began to emerge. A professional group of booksellers in Leipzig decided to form their own association in 1824, and in 1825 the Börsenverein der Deutschen Buchhändler zu Leipzig became the first group to publish outside of the printer's guilds, leading to more people joining the profession without needing to be attached to a guild. The earliest printers were also editors and booksellers; but being unable to sell every copy of the works they printed, they had agents at most of the seats of learning, such as Anton Koberger, who introduced the art of printing into Nuremberg in 1470. The most common types of books printed in large quantities were able to be cheaply produced like catechisms and almanacs and often not bound at all.

The religious dissensions of the Reformation in 16th-century continental Europe and the English Reformation in England under Henry VIII and Edward VI fostered a great demand for books; but in England governments of both the Tudor and Stuart dynasties feared a free press and made various efforts to control the distribution of printed materials.

The first patent for the office of king's printer was granted to Thomas Berthelet by Henry VIII in 1529, but only such books as were first licensed were to be printed. At that time even the purchase or possession of an unlicensed book was a punishable offense. In 1556 the Company of Stationers was incorporated, and very extensive powers were granted in order that obnoxious books might be repressed. In the following reigns the Star Chamber exercised a rather effectual censorship; but, in spite of all precautions, such was the demand for books of a polemical nature, that entrepreneurs and subversives printed many abroad and surreptitiously introduced them into England.

In the course of the 16th and 17th centuries the Low Countries for a time became the chief centre of the bookselling world, and many of the folios and quartos in their libraries bear the names of Jansen, Blauw or Plantin, with the imprint of Amsterdam, Utrecht, Leiden or Antwerp, while the Elzevirs produced - besides other works - pocket classics. The southern towns of Douai and Saint-Omer (both in present-day France) at the same time furnished polemical works in English.

Queen Elizabeth I (r. 1558–1603) interfered little with books except when they emanated from Roman Catholics, or touched upon her royal prerogatives; and towards the end of her reign, and during that of her successor, James (r. 1603–1625), bookselling flourished. So much had bookselling increased during the Protectorate of 1653–1659 that in 1658 William London published A Catalogue of the most Vendible Books in England. A bad time immediately followed. Although there were provincial booksellers, the centre of the trade was St. Paul's Churchyard. When the Great Fire of London began in 1666 the booksellers put most of their stock in the vaults of the church, where it was destroyed. The Restoration of 1660 restored the office of Licenser of the Press, which continued until 1694.

The first British copyright statute, the Statute of Anne (1709), which specially relates to booksellers, enacted that, if any person shall think the published price of a book unreasonably high, he may make a complaint to the Archbishop of Canterbury, and to certain other persons named, who shall examine his complaint, and if well founded reduce the price; and any bookseller charging more than the price so fixed shall be fined £5 for every copy sold. The complaint procedure prescribed in this statute was apparently never used.

Modern book-selling has changed dramatically with the advent of the computer. With major websites such as Amazon, eBay, and other book distributors offering affiliate programs, book sales can be facilitated through an affiliate program.

== Selling and publishing ==
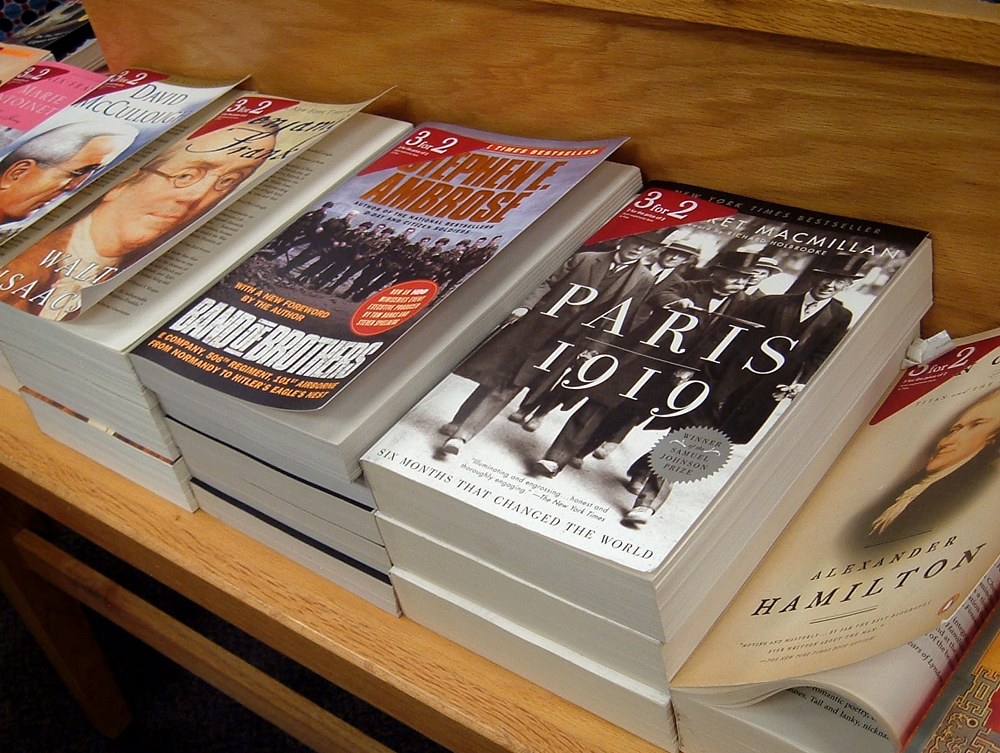
Books on a table in a Borders store in Georgia, USA. Borders stores started closing in 2010.

For later times it is necessary to make a gradual distinction between booksellers, whose trade consists in selling books, either by retail or wholesale, and publishers, whose business involves the production of the books from the author's manuscripts, and who are the intermediaries between author and bookseller, just as the booksellers (in the restricted sense) are intermediaries between the author and publisher and the public. The convenience of this distinction is not impaired by the fact either that a publisher is also a wholesale bookseller, or that a still more recent development in publishing started a reaction to some extent in the way of amalgamating the two functions. The scheme of The Times Book Club (started in 1905) was, again, a combination of a subscription library with the business of bookselling and it brought the organization of a newspaper, with all its means of achieving publicity, into the work of promoting the sale of books, in a way which practically introduced a new factor into the bookselling business.

James Lackington is credited as the person responsible for changing this profession. His bookshop, known as The Temple of the Muses, was in Finsbury Square in north London.

=== Specialty developments ===
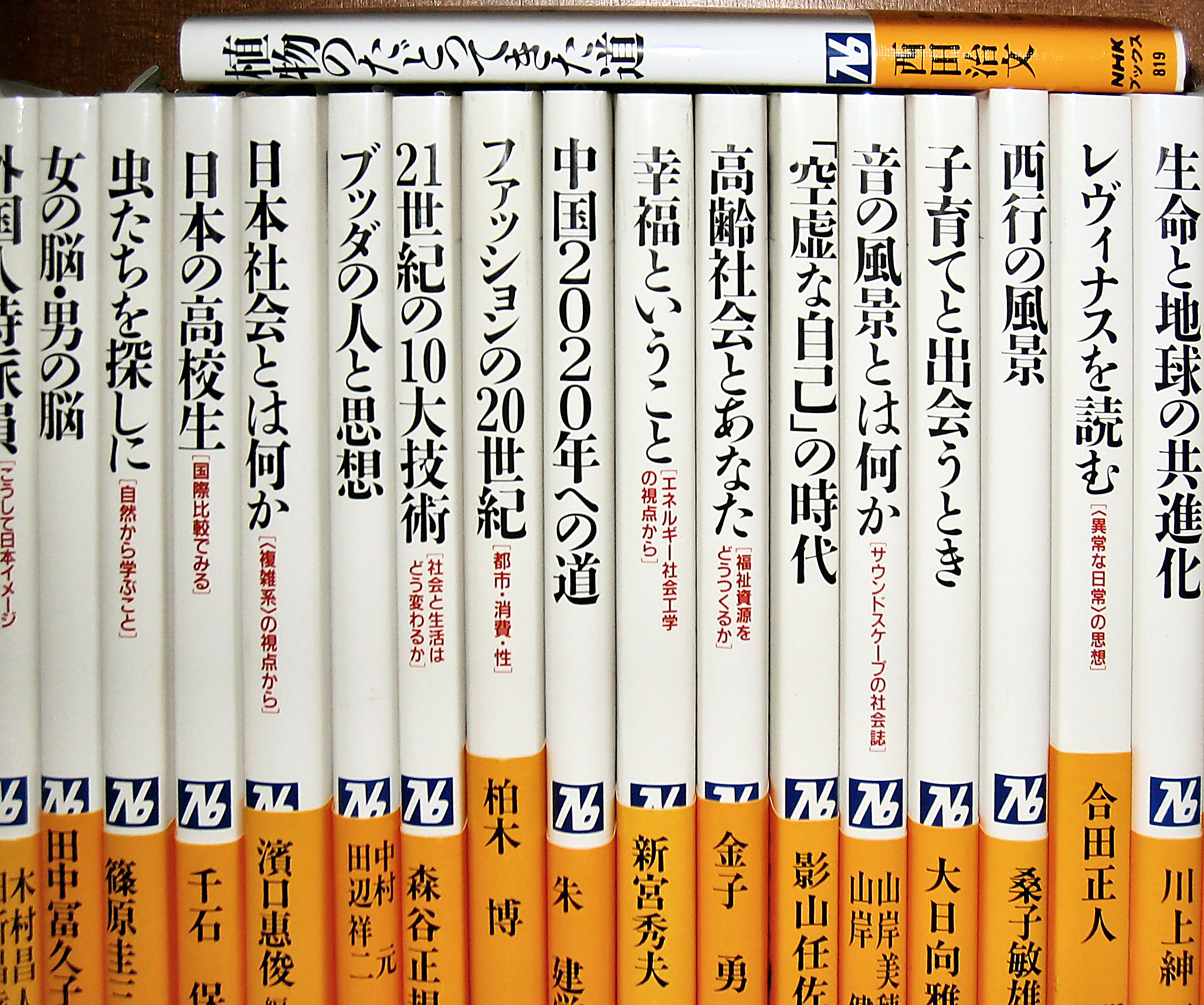
Books in a Tokyo bookstore

During the 19th century it remains the fact that the distinction between publisher and bookseller—literary promoter and shopkeeper—became fundamental. The booksellers, as such, were engaged either in wholesale bookselling, or in the retail, the old or second-hand (now includes rare and very old books trade, called antiquarian books), and the periodicals publishing or retailing trades.

Coming between the publisher and the retail bookseller is the important distributing agency of the wholesale bookseller. It is to him that the retailer and libraries look for supplies, as it is impossible to stock all of the books published. Paternoster Row, London, was for over a hundred years the centre of this industry, where retail booksellers, busily engaged in obtaining the books ordered by the book-buying public. It is where the publisher calls first on showing or "subscribing" a new book, a critical process, for by the number thus ordered the fate of a book is sometimes determined. In the United States, Baker & Taylor is a major distributor.

What may be termed the third partner in publishing is the retail bookseller; and to protect their interests there was established in 1890 a London booksellers' society, which had for its object the restriction of discounts to 25%, and also to arrange prices generally and control all details connected with the trade. The society a few years afterwards widened its field of operations so as to include the whole of the United Kingdom, and it became "The Associated Booksellers of Great Britain and Ireland."

== Bookselling in the United States ==
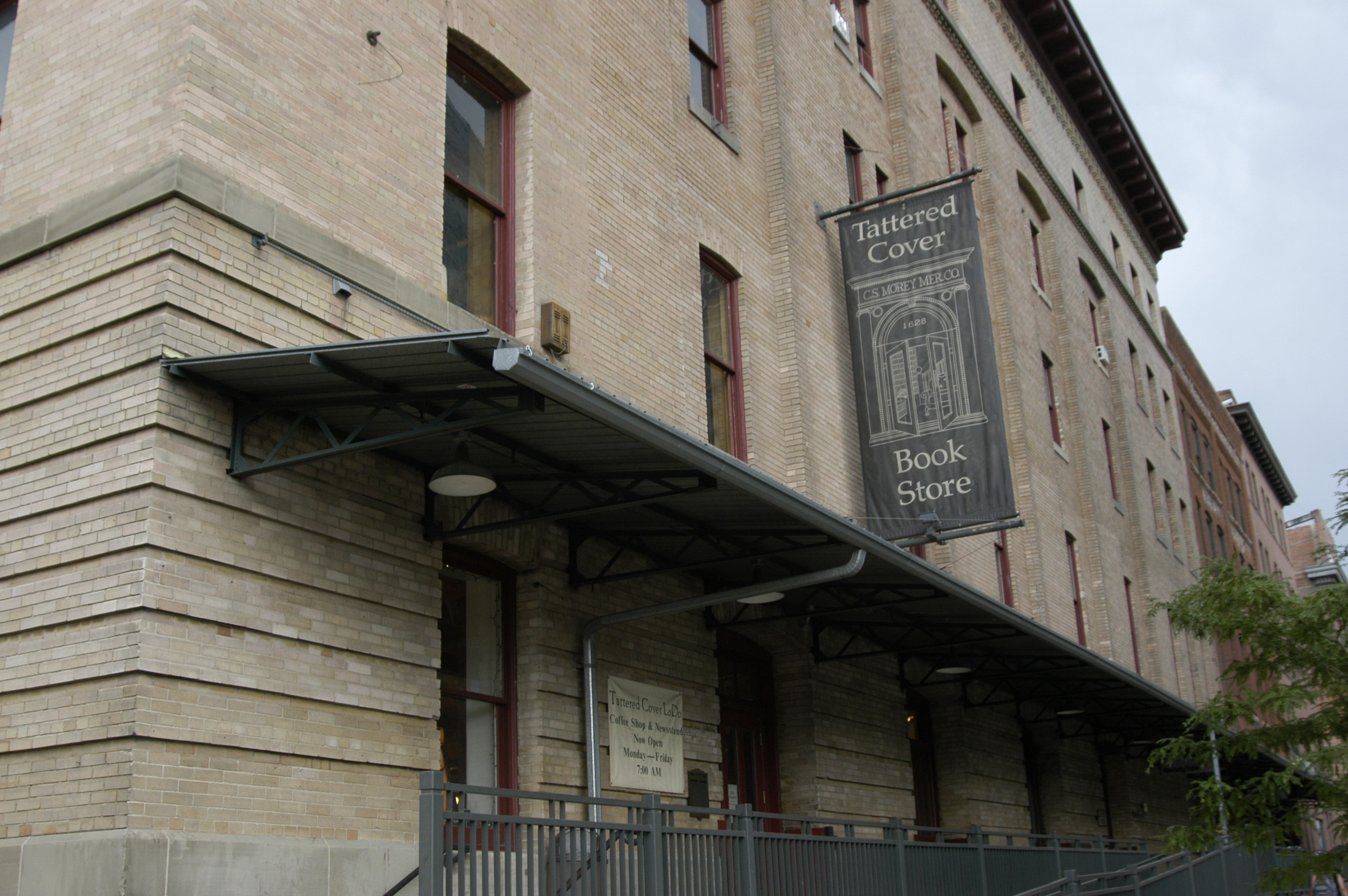
The Tattered Cover is a bookstore in Denver, Colorado, and one of the largest independent bookstores in the United States.

The history of bookselling in the United States is of special interest. The Spanish settlements drew away from the old country much of its enterprise and best talent, and the presses of Mexico and other cities teemed with publications mostly of a religious character, but many others, especially linguistic and historical, were also published. Bookselling in the United States was of a somewhat later growth, although printing and bookselling was introduced into Cambridge, Massachusetts, as early as 1640 by Hezekiah Usher and by Usher in 1652 in Boston. Bookselling was happening in Philadelphia in 1685, and New York in 1693. Franklin had served to make the trade illustrious, yet few persons were engaged in it at the commencement of the 19th century. Books chiefly for scholars and libraries were imported from Europe; but after the War of 1812 printing-presses multiplied rapidly, and with the spread of newspapers and education there also arose a demand for books, and publishers set to work to secure the advantages offered by the wide field of English literature, the whole of which they had the liberty of reaping free of all cost beyond that of production. The works of Walter Scott, Lord Byron, Thomas Moore, Robert Southey, William Wordsworth, and indeed of every author of note, were reprinted without the smallest payment to author or proprietor. Half the names of the authors in the so-called "American" catalogue of books printed between 1820 and 1852 are British. These titles were made available and affordable to the public. In consequence of the Civil War, the high price of labour, and the restrictive duties laid on in order to protect native industry, coupled with the frequent dealings with England, a great change took place, and American publishers and booksellers, while there was still no international copyright, made liberal offers for early sheets of new publications. Boston, New York and Philadelphia still retained their old supremacy as bookselling centres. Meanwhile, the distinct publishing business also grew, until gradually the conditions of business became assimilated to those of Europe.

=== African-American booksellers ===
Bookselling is a profession historically dominated by white Americans, but African Americans developed their own tradition of book selling, particularly in conjunction with radical political movements such as abolitionism, black nationalism, Black Power, and Marxism. The first documented African American bookstore was owned and operated by the abolitionist David Ruggles in the 1830s in New York City. In the years of the civil rights and Black Power era of the 1950s and 1960s, Lewis Michaux's National Memorial African Bookstore became arguably the most prominent Black-owned bookstore in the United States. In the 1980s and '90s, Clara Villarosa's Hue Man Books became the most prominent Black-owned bookstore in the nation, first in Denver and later in Harlem.
