= Modern Pickwick Club =

The Modern Pickwick Club was a young men's literary and social club founded in Adelaide, South Australia, in the 1890s.

== History ==
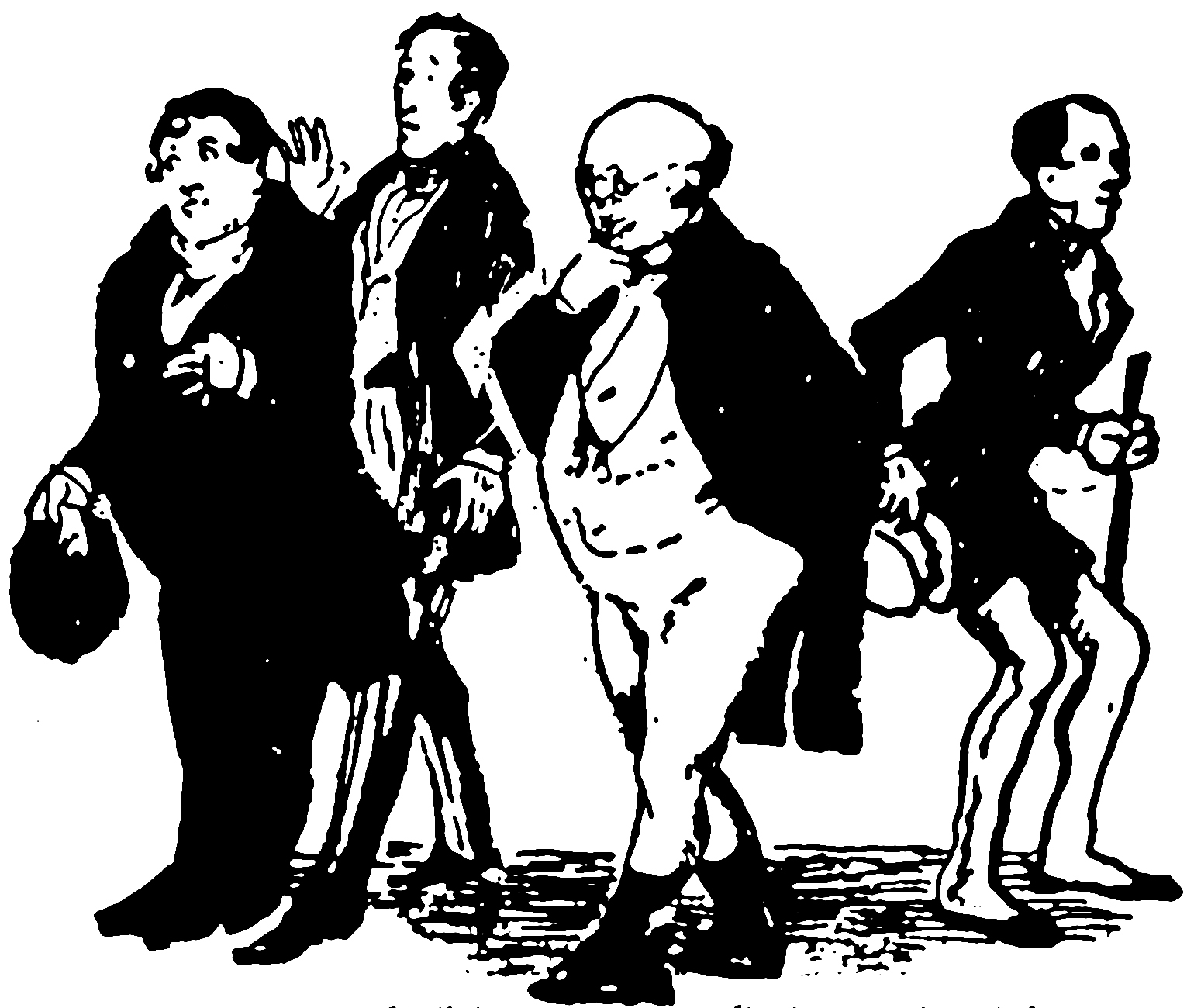
Illustration from The Posthumous Papers of the Pickwick Club

The club was formed in 1891 as a social club restricted, by invitation, to 30 members, all unmarried men. It was a condition of joining that the prospective member should already be known to the other 29, and members must resign immediately they marry. They met regularly at members' homes for talks and discussions as well as entertainment. It was a hard and fast rule that no refreshments would be taken at the member's house, but after the meeting all would adjourn to the nearest hostelry.

It was not a Dickens society, though it held occasional Dickens nights, rather it was the spirit of Samuel Pickwick that they invoked — riotous good fellowship. They produced plays, and competed in debating, tennis tournaments and cricket matches. "The nights were divided between debate, and music, and elocution. It was a good training ground, and the atmosphere was clean and wholesome." An annual match was held between past and present members. Every year shooting, fishing and walking trips were organised. Their annual ball, held at the North Adelaide Institute, was considered the highlight of the season and eagerly awaited. Meetings were held every Saturday night, except during WWI, when they were held monthly.

== Members ==
Founding members include: James Wardlaw Gordon (died 29 August 1922) (secretary), Benjamin H. Gillman (Chairman), P. A. von Bertouch W. H. Porter, H. S. Brondel, Douglas Malcolm, B. H. Kelsey, and R. H. Kelsey. Later chairmen were Arthur E. H. Evans, William Russell Hambidge and William Newman Twiss. Francis Charles Siekmann (died 1940) was an energetic secretary. Newspapermen Berkeley Conigrave, Roland Harcus Kelsey, Norman Malcolm, William Cormack Calder, Ernest Whitington, Rodney Cockburn and James Chamberlain were all members, as were lawyers George McEwin, Angas Parsons and Mellis Napier, Edgar Layton Bean, and Crown Solicitor Howard Alison Shierlaw. Romilly Harry was a later chairman. Stanley H. Skipper and J. S. Hardy were later members.

Members who died in WWI include Capt. Norman C. Shierlaw and Charles L. Moule; Lieuts. Robert G. Raws, Frank H. Lang; and Angus S. Ferguson; and Ptes. A. Murton and John T. Doswell. Volunteers who survived include Majors Harry Thomson and John James Hughes, Capts. N. M. Malcolm and L. A. Whitington, Lieuts. Leslie Horrocks Haslam and T. D. Hardy, Sgt. N. M. Shaw. Pte. G. C. Ligertwood, Tpr. Horace George Annells, and Gnr. Leopold von Bertouch, also Major Victor Marra Newland, Lieuts. Edward Vincent Clark, L. H. (Lloyd Hayes?) Burgess, J. H. Vaughan, Sgt. W. Henderson, Cpl. Henry Mortimer Muirhead, Ptes. J. Hunter, P. F. Lucas, and H. Stephenson, and Dvr. J. C. Martin

Other members were: R. F. Richardson, who was elected a life member, Harold Wilkinson, one (perhaps Robert) Northey, William H. Porter Herb Degenhardt and Clarence Degenhardt, Harold Kelsey, Bert Hambidge, and (later Sir) Frederick W. Young. Reginald Beeton Murray Buttrose A. M. Simpson. Others of the legal fraternity who were once members, include John Howard Vaughan, Spencer Toler Toler-Rowley, Rudolph Paul Albrecht von Bertouch, Percy Emerson Johnstone, and Edward Warner Benham. The medical profession was represented by Frank Magarey and Edward Ernest Moule, later of Wagin, Western Australia.

From time to time newspapers reported on doings of the club — 1923, 1929, and 1935, but, being a small private club, it usually only rates a mention in obituaries. Its demise has not yet been reported.

== See also ==
- The Pickwick Papers
