= List of Tracey Takes On... characters =

Tracey Takes On... features Tracey Ullman playing an array of original characters. Unlike her previous series, The Tracey Ullman Show, where characters were very rarely repeated, Ullman created a recurring cast of 18 characters to play over the course of the series' four-season run. Six of these characters originated from her previous specials: Trevor Ayliss, Virginia Bugge, and Janie and Jackie Pillsworth from Tracey Ullman: A Class Act, and Linda Granger and Fern Rosenthal from Tracey Ullman Takes on New York. Janie is the only character to appear in both specials and all four seasons of the show.

Two characters were retired during the series' run: Virginia after Season 2, and Mrs. Noh Nang Ning after Season 3. Conversely, three characters were added over the course of the show: Birdie Godsen in Season 2, Sheneesha Turner in Season 3, and Madam Nadja in Season 4.

Three actors portrayed Virginia's husband, Timmy: Michael Palin (Tracey Ullman: A Class Act), Hugh Laurie (Season 1), and Tim McInnerny (Season 2). Likewise, two actors played Fern's husband, Harry: Michael Tucker (Tracey Ullman Takes on New York; Seasons 1, 3–4), and George Segal (Season 2).

== Overview ==
=== Main characters ===
All are played by Tracey Ullman.

Character	Occupation	A Class Act	New York	Season 1	Season 2	Season 3	Season 4
Trevor Ayliss	Airline steward	X mark		X mark	X mark	X mark	X mark
Virginia Bugge	Politician's wife	X mark		X mark	X mark		
Chic	New York City cab driver			X mark	X mark	X mark	X mark
Kay Clark	Bank employee; caregiver			X mark	X mark	X mark	X mark
Hope Finch	College student			X mark	X mark	X mark	X mark
Rayleen Gibson	Stuntwoman			X mark	X mark	X mark	X mark
Birdie Godsen	Homemaker				X mark	X mark	X mark
Linda Granger	Actress, singer, author		X mark	X mark	X mark	X mark	X mark
Her Royal Highness	Royal family member			X mark	X mark	X mark	X mark
Sydney Kross	Lawyer			X mark	X mark	X mark	X mark
Erin McColl	Singer-songwriter			X mark	X mark	X mark	X mark
Madam Nadja	Beverly Hills madam						X mark
Mrs. Noh Nang Ning	Donut shop owner			X mark	X mark	X mark	
Janie Pillsworth	Magazine editor	X mark	X mark	X mark	X mark	X mark	X mark
Ruby Romaine	Make-up artist			X mark	X mark	X mark	X mark
Fern Rosenthal	Retiree		X mark	X mark	X mark	X mark	X mark
Sheneesha Turner	Airport security worker					X mark	X mark
Chris Warner	Life partner of professional golfer, Midge Dexter			X mark	X mark	X mark	X mark

=== Recurring minor characters ===
Character	Actor	Occupation	A Class Act	New York	Season 1	Season 2	Season 3	Season 4
Timothy "Timmy" Bugge	Michael Palin	Member of Parliament; Virginia's husband	X mark					
Timothy "Timmy" Bugge	Hugh Laurie	Member of Parliament; Virginia's husband			X mark			
Timothy "Timmy" Bugge	Tim McInnerny	Member of Parliament; Virginia's husband				X mark		
Candy Casino	Seymour Cassel	Linda Granger's agent and manager			X mark	X mark	X mark	X mark
Darnetta	Adilah Barnes	Bank employee; Kay's manager			X mark			
Darnetta	Gloria Gifford	Bank employee; Kay's manager				X mark	X mark	X mark
Midge Dexter	Julie Kavner	Professional golfer; Chris Warner's partner			X mark	X mark	X mark	X mark
Mitch Gibson	Danny Woodburn	Stunt performer; Rayleen's husband			X mark	X mark		
Hellura	Adele Givens	Airport security worker; Sheneesha's co-worker					X mark	X mark
Ida	Patricia Belcher	Airport security worker; Sheneesha's co-worker					X mark	X mark
Jordan	Joshua Malina	Sydney's assistant			X mark			
Jordan	Ross Benjamin	Sydney's assistant						X mark
Barrington "Barry" LeTissier	Michael McKean	Antiquarian bookseller; Trevor's partner			X mark	X mark	X mark	X mark
Jackie Pillsworth	Tracey Ullman	Housekeeper (New York); nanny (seasons 2–4); Janie's mother	X mark	X mark		X mark	X mark	X mark
Dusty Roads	Mo Gaffney	Erin's manager				X mark	X mark	X mark
Harry Rosenthal	Michael Tucker	Retiree; former pharmacist; Fern's husband		X mark	X mark		X mark	X mark
Harry Rosenthal	George Segal	Retiree; former pharmacist; Fern's husband				X mark		
Philip "Pip" St. Aubyn	Alastair Duncan	Her Royal Highness's Private Secretary			X mark	X mark	X mark	X mark
Jobie Wolff	Julie Kavner	Retiree; condo association president; Fern's friend			X mark	X mark	X mark	X mark

== Trevor Ayliss ==
Age 43. British. Trevor is a gay airline steward based out of Heathrow, London. Trevor grew up in Northern England and now lives in Osterley with his partner, Barrington "Barry" LeTissier (Michael McKean), an antiquarian bookseller. He is a big fan of Linda Granger.

== Virginia Bugge ==
Age 36. British. Virginia Bugge (pronounced "byoog") was born in Rhodesia and is married to The Right Honourable Timothy "Timmy" Bugge, the Conservative Member of Parliament for Greater Diddlebury and the Minister of Fishing and Game. They have two children, Tasmin and Piers, who have attended boarding school since the age of six.

== Chic ==
Chic (pronounced "chick" or "cheek") is a male New York City cab driver of indeterminate Middle Eastern descent and a self-described "chick-magnet" (hence the name). Chic came to the United States illegally with his sister. He made his way around New York City knowing only two English phrases: "Are you talking to me?" (which he learned from watching the movie Taxi Driver) and "Show me your tits!" He sold drugs in the 1970s to get his hack license. He has a brother, Piki, who runs a falafel stand, and a cousin, Momo, who owns a discount carpet warehouse.

Chic claims to have had many celebrities in his cab and even claims to have taught John Travolta his dance moves for the movie Saturday Night Fever. Chic runs the only two-star cab cafe in Manhattan. He was the bronze medal winner at the Pan Mediterranean song Festival with his band Teiku, for their song "Slide Down My Olive Tree (Ooh, Baby, La La La)".

== Kay Clark ==
Age 42. Kay is a spinster originally from England. She moved to the United States with her invalid mother to take advantage of the health benefits. She works at a bank, Van Nuys Savings and Loan.

== Hope Finch ==
Age 19. Hope is an idealistic college student. She attends Sweet Briar College, where she resides in Margaret Sanger Hall. She's a virgin, and although not currently a lesbian, she's "young and impressionable".

== Rayleen Gibson ==
Age 34 (approximated by the wear on her back molars). Rayleen is an Australian "stuntwoman to the stars". When she was a child, she was lost on a family camping trip and, until the age of ten, was raised by dingoes. She eventually met up with a woman (Olivia Newton-John) who saw to her education and put her in touch with film producers. She went on to marry Mitch Gibson (Danny Woodburn), a little person. Rayleen and Mitch own and run Aged Animal Actors Home (or A.A.A.H.), for retired animal actors.

== Birdie Godsen ==
Age 42. Birdie is a right-wing devout Christian fundamentalist homemaker. Her husband Robert is a tobacco industry executive. Birdie homeschools their seven children to prevent them from being exposed to multicultural programs and teaches them subjects that in her words will actually be useful to them in their daily lives: reading, writing, arithmetic, religion, marksmanship and taxidermy. The family lives on Dan Quayle Drive in a 'graceful gated community' in Atlanta, Georgia. Birdie is aunt to Chris Warner. She has a twin brother, Sandy, who runs a "homosexual deprogramming center", Straight Ways. In her spare time, Birdie sells Militia M'Lady products, attends a "We Hate Hillary" club, and looks out for black government helicopters flying overhead with weaponry in her backyard to shoot them down if need be.

== Linda Granger ==
Age varies. Linda is an actress, singer, and author. She starred as the character Vicki Starr in the hit 1970s television series V.I.P. Lounge. She authored a tell-all autobiography, I'm Still Here!! My Lifelong Battle with Alcoholism, Disease, and Personal Misfortune, which details her battles with substance abuse, alcoholism, cancer, and eating disorders. Linda is also a recovering sex addict. She has one child, a daughter named Marmalade (Kristin Dattilo), whom she secretly gave up for adoption to sustain her public image and subsequently re-adopted. Marmalade's father is unknown. Linda's closest allies are her manager, Candy Casino (Seymour Cassel), and her "solid homosexual fanbase".

== Her Royal Highness ==
Age 57. HRH derives enormous pleasure from making everyone around her as uncomfortable as possible. Her private secretary, Captain Philip "Pip" St. Aubyn (Alastair Duncan), is always on hand to assist her.

== Sydney Kross ==
Age unknown ("It's illegal to ask that question."). She is a ruthless, charmless high-profile Beverly Hills attorney. Her motto is "You name it, I'll sue it."

== Erin McColl ==
Age 47. Erin is the former lead singer of the 1970s band Wisechild. She often loses her train of thought and depends on her manager, Dusty (Mo Gaffney), for guidance.

== Madam Nadja ==
Age 60. Madam Nadja, who hails from Romania, is now a Hollywood madam who conducts all her business from her bed. She was great friends with Nicolae and Elena Ceaușescu, and was at one time his mistress. Her parrot, Vlad, talks to her.

== Mrs. Noh Nang Ning ==
Age 70. Mrs. Noh Nang Ning, who is of indeterminate Asian origin, owns and operates a Los Angeles donut shop, Yankee Doodle Donuts. She is a hardworking, patriotic American who almost always relates everything to the donut. Mrs. Noh Nang Ning grew up as an orphan in her homeland, was eventually engaged and married to a prince, and fled to the United States after a revolution broke out. She works long hours and finds little time for pleasantries, though she does enjoy playing pai gow in Las Vegas. However, she does make time to sponsor her granddaughter, Kim, in ice skating competitions.

== Janie Pillsworth ==
Age 37. Janie Pillsworth (born Janine) is a Manhattan magazine editor who hails from Broxbourne, England, and is the only child of Frank and Jackie Pillsworth. She attended a prestigious British boarding school thanks to her working-class father sacrificing his kidney to pay her tuition. While there, Janie reinvented herself and disowned her parents. The family was not reunited until an unscrupulous colleague revealed Janie's true identity and she was forced to face her past. After her father died, Janie let her mother, who also acted as a live-in nanny, move in with her.

== Ruby Romaine ==
Age 72. A Hollywood make-up artist (one of the oldest still working in the union) who's seen it all. She worked heavily during Hollywood's heyday. Ruby's hobbies include wine tasting, poker, and preserving old Hollywood. She takes care of her shell-shocked Vietnam War veteran son, Buddy, along with her cat, Duke, and their Vietnamese Pot-bellied pig, Oinky. Ruby also has a daughter, Desirée.

== Fern Rosenthal ==
Age 56. Fern is a Jewish homemaker, originally from Long Island. After 37 years of marriage, Fern convinced her husband, Harry, to retire to Boca Raton, Florida, after he suffered a heart attack. Harry was the owner of a chain of 17 discount pharmacies. They have one daughter, Sheila, and a grandson, Ryan. Fern's closest friend and occasional rival is condo board president Jobie Wolff (Julie Kavner).

== Sheneesha Turner ==
Age 34. Sheneesha is an African-American airport security guard. She works the metal detector along with her friends and coworkers Hellura (Adele Givens) and Ida (Patricia Belcher). She is enthusiastic about performing body searches and checking luggage for contraband.

== Chris Warner ==
Age 32. Chris is a lesbian originally from Barstow, Texas, and the girlfriend of professional golfer Midge Dexter (Julie Kavner). She is also the niece of Birdie Godsen and Birdie's twin brother, Sandy, a Christian fundamentalist preacher who runs a "homosexual deprogramming center", Straight Ways. Chris put her career as a step aerobics instructor on hold to travel the country with Midge. The pair made headlines when they came out publicly by embracing and kissing after Midge's first win.

== One-off characters ==
=== Anya ===
Appeared in "Tracey Takes On... Nostalgia"

A Russian babushka who longs for the old days of the Cold War.

=== Laura Demerol ===
Appeared in "Tracey Takes On... Nostalgia"

An actress who takes part in a documentary about The Bush Pilot, a film dubbed "The Epic that Never Was".

=== Alicia Del Mar ===
Appeared in "Tracey Takes On... Nostalgia"

An actress who went into seclusion after the film The Bush Pilot shut down production. Only Ruby Romaine knows her whereabouts.

=== Sydney's mother ===
Appeared in "Tracey Takes On... Fantasy"

Sydney fantasizes about blackmailing her with information regarding the murder of her husband, Sydney's father.

=== Sandy ===
Appeared in "Tracey Takes On... Religion"

Birdie Godsen's twin brother and Chris Warner's uncle. He is a Christian fundamentalist preacher who runs the "homosexual deprogramming center" Straight Ways.

=== Marigold ===
Appeared in "Tracey Takes On... Obsession"

A ballroom dance instructor who teaches Trevor and Barry.

== Sources ==
- Tracey takes on... Characters' Lounge at the Wayback Machine (archived 23 June 1998)
- Tracey Takes On... The Characters at the Wayback Machine (archived 25 September 2000)
- Ullman, Tracey (1998). Tracey Takes On. Hyperion. ISBN 978-0-786-86340-2.
