= Abraham Fowler =

English poet

Abraham Fowler (fl. 1577) was an English poet.

Fowler was a queen's scholar at Westminster, whence he was elected to Christ Church, Oxford, in 1568. His name does not appear on the university register. He contributed a poem in alternate rhymes to A Philosophical Discourse, entituled the Anatomie of the Minde. London. 1576. by Thomas Rogers. Rogers was a student of Christ Church. Fowler's verse is followed by a poem by William Camden.
