= Erik Whittington =

Erik Whittington was the American lead and rhythm guitarist for the Christian rock band, Tragedy Ann, signed to Organic Records. Whittington recorded with Tragedy Ann for all three of their albums. In 1998, he appeared on Lesser; in 1999 he appeared on the release One Nation Under God and in 2000 he appeared on the final Tragedy Ann release, Viva la Revolucion. He is also known for his work as the touring guitarist for Tooth & Nail Records recording artist Sometime Sunday, and Star Wars tribute band, Twin Sister. The lead singer for all three of Whittington's band was Mikee Bridges, known for starting TOMFest where Tragedy Ann played a reunion concert in 2000 and 2009. Tragedy Ann gained controversy as they became the front men for an organization known as Rock for Life, a pro-life organization, during their tours. Whittington left the music industry to run Rock for Life full-time. Both Tragedy Ann and Sometime Sunday appeared on Rock for Life compilation CDs.

Whittington's work with Rock for Life has been mentioned in two nationally published books, Righteous: Dispatches from the Evangelical Youth Movement by Lauren Sandler, and Body Piercing Saved My Life: Inside the Phenomenon of Christian Rock by Andrew Beaujon (a senior contributing writer for SPIN and known for his music project Eggs).
