= Thomas Rogers (priest) =

English Anglican clergyman

Thomas Rogers (died in 1616) was an English Anglican clergyman, known as a theologian, controversialist and translator.

== Life ==
He was a student of Christ Church, Oxford, in 1571, and graduated B.A. 7 July 1573, and M.A. 6 July 1576. He was subsequently (11 December 1581) rector of Horringer in Suffolk. Initially he was on good terms with local Puritan figures such as John Knewstub and Walter Allen; but his own views changed within a few years. Rogers was an early opponent of Nicholas Bownde in the Sabbatarian controversy.

Rogers became chaplain to Richard Bancroft, and assisted him in literary work. He died at Horringer, and was buried in the chancel of his church there, 22 February 1616.

== Works ==
Rogers's major works were on the English creed:

- The English Creed, wherein is contained in Tables an Exposition on the Articles which every Man is to Subscribe unto. London. 1585 [1579]., and
- The English Creede Consenting with the True, Auncient, Catholique and Apostolique Church ... The First Parte, Etc. London. 1585..

The latter subsequently appeared in another form as an exposition of the Thirty-nine Articles, entitled The Faith, Doctrine and Religion: Professed and Protected in the Realm of England, and Dominions of the Same; Expressed in Thirty Nine Articles. ... London. 1681. This book was later praised by Augustus Toplady, Edward Bickersteth and other evangelical divines, and was reprinted in 1854 by the Parker Society.

Popular were Rogers's translation of The Imitation of Christ (London, 1580); often reprinted till 1639 and his Of the Ende of this World and the Second Coming of Christ, translated from the Latin of Scheltoo à Geveren, London 1577, 1578, 1589. The latter work endorsed the conclusions of George Joye on the second coming as due in the sixteenth century, and with more specific predictions to the late 1580s. À Geveren was a lawyer in Emden, whom Rogers may have visited in 1577; his work was influenced by mystical and rabbinic thought.

Other original publications by him were:

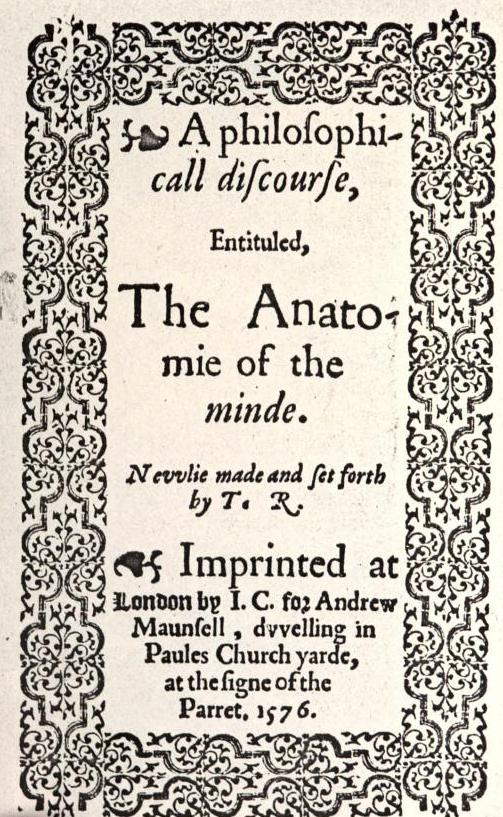
Title page of The Anatomie of the Minde by Thomas Rogers, published by Andrew Maunsell in 1576

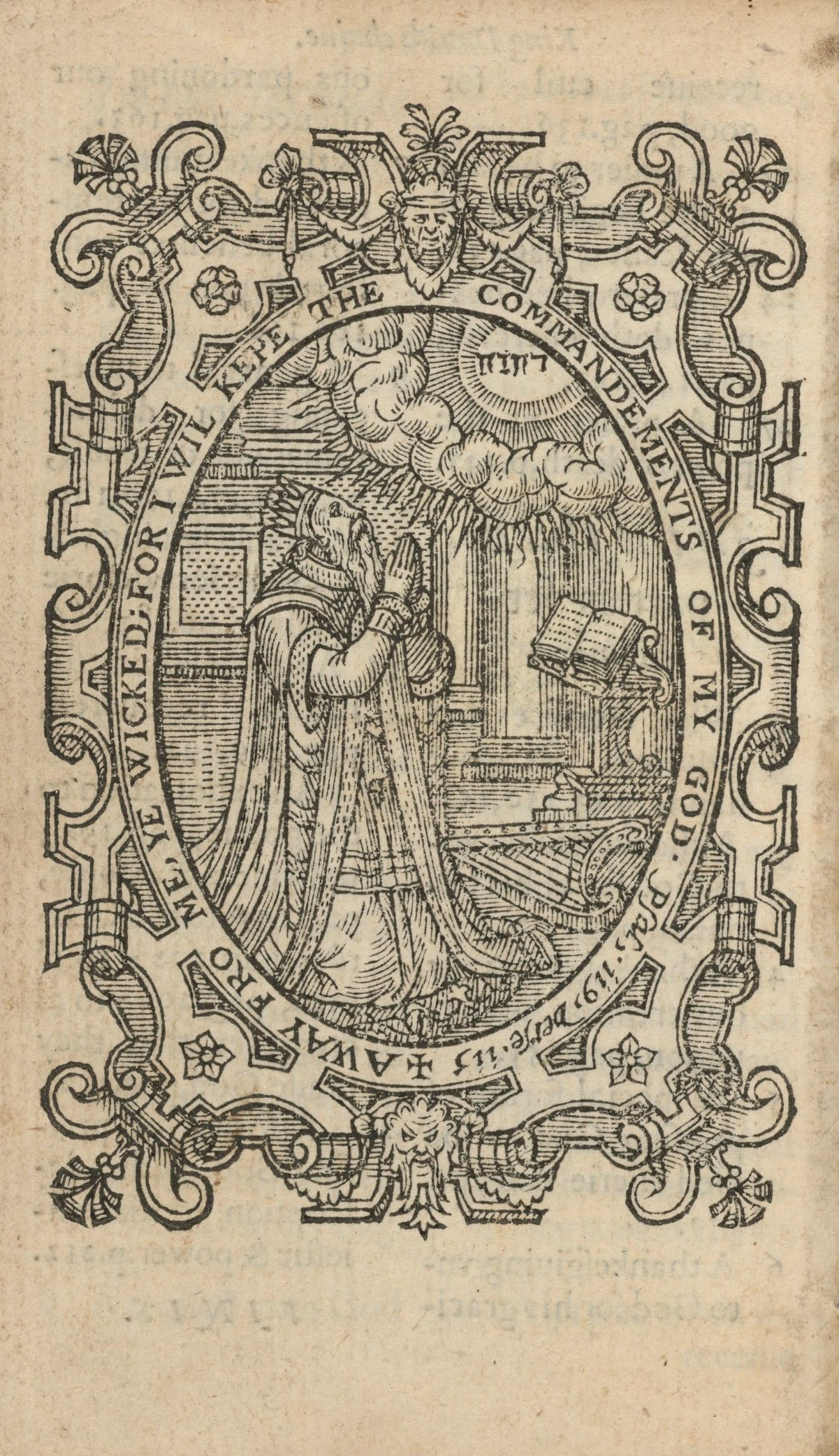
Image from A Golden Chaine, 1579

- A Philosophical Discourse, entituled the Anatomie of the Minde. London. 1576. This is a work on the passions from a largely Aristotelian point of view. The front matter includes an epigram from William Camden, a poem by Abraham Fowler, and other poetry by Josua Hutten and Justinian Baldwin.
- General Session, containing an Apology of the Comfortable Doctrine concerning the End of the World and the Second Coming of Christ, London, 1581.
- A Golden Chaine taken out of the Rich Treasure House, the Psalms of King David … 1587, with The Pearls of King Solomon gathered into Common Places—taken from the Proverbs of the said King.
- Historical Dialogue touching Antichrist and Popery, London, 1589.
- A Sermon upon the 6, 7 and 8 Verses of the 12 Chapter of St. Pauls Epistle unto the Romanes, London, 13 April 1590. In answer to a sermon by Thomas Cartwright on the same text.
- Miles Christianus, or a Just Apologie of all necessarie … writers, speciallie of them which … in a … Deffamatorie Epistle are unjustly depraved, 1590; against Miles Mosse.
- Two Dialogues or Conferences (about an old question lately renued …) concerning kneeling in the very act of receiving the Sacramental bread and wine in the Supper of the Lord, London, 1608.

Rogers's translations included

- A General Discourse against the damnable Sect of Usurers, 1578, from the Latin of Philipp Caesar;
- The Enemie of Securitie, 1580, 1591 ... from the Latin of Johann Habermann;
- The Faith of the Church Militant … described in this Exposition of the 84 Psalme by … N. Hemmingius … 1581 (from Niels Hemmingsen);
- St. Augustine's Praiers, London, 1581, with St. Augustine's Manual;
- A pretious Book of Heavenlie Meditations by St. Augustine, London, 1600, 1612, 1616, 1629, dedicated to Thomas Wilson, D.C.L.;
- Of the Foolishness of Men in putting off the Amendement of their Lives from Daie to Daie (1582?), from the Latin of Johann Rivius;
- A Methode unto Mortification: called heretofore the Contempt of the World and the vanitie thereof. Written at the first in the Spanish, afterwards translated into the Italian, English, and Latine Tongues, London, 1608, from Diego de Estella;
- Soliloquium Animæ, 1616, 1628, 1640, by Thomas à Kempis.

William Carew Hazlitt also identified him with the Thomas Rogers, author of Celestiall Elegies of the Goddesses and the Muses, deploring the death of Frances, Countesse of Hertford, London, 1598; reprinted in the Roxburghe Club's Lamport Garland, 1887. The work is now attributed to Thomas Rogers of Bryanston.

== Notes and references ==
- Shaw, William Arthur (1900). "Rogers, Thomas (d.1616)" . Dictionary of National Biography. London: Smith, Elder & Co.
- Ball, Bryan W. (1975). A Great Expectation: Eschatological Thought in English Protestantism to 1660. BRILL. p. 21. ISBN 978-90-04-04315-2.
- Collinson, Patrick; Craig, John; Usher, Brett (2003). Conferences and Combination Lectures in the Elizabethan Church: Dedham and Bury St Edmunds, 1582–1590. Boydell Press. ISBN 978-0-85115-938-6.
- Tilmouth, Christopher (2010). Passion's Triumph over Reason: A History of the Moral Imagination from Spenser to Rochester: A History of the Moral Imagination from Spenser to Rochester. Oxford University Press. ISBN 978-0-19-959304-0.
- Watson, George; Willison, Ian Roy (1974). The New Cambridge Bibliography of English Literature. Cambridge University Press. p. 1905. ISBN 978-0-521-20004-2.
- Georg Brückner (1876). "Philipp Caesar" . Allgemeine Deutsche Biographie (in German). Vol. 3. Leipzig: Duncker & Humblot. p. 687.
