= Apostles of Rock =

Book about Christian Rock

Apostles of Rock: The Splintered World of Contemporary Christian Music is a book about Christian Rock written by Jay R. Howard and John M. Streck.

== Background ==
The book discusses Six Pence None the Richer's hit song "Kiss Me", which became popular outside of contemporary Christian music. The book was published on August 27, 1999. The book applies the categories that H. Richard Niebuhr established in Christ and Culture to contemporary Christian music. The book also applies the concept of "art world" that Howard S. Becker established in his book Art Worlds. The book discusses the start of Tooth & Nail Records. The book also discusses Larry Norman's album "Upon This Rock". The book identifies three different types of Christian music: "Separational CCM", "Integrational CCM", and "Transformational CCM". The book discusses how CCM emerged from the Jesus movement and Christian reactions to popular music. The book discusses how Christian musicical artists differ on their opinion of how to approach the relationship of secular and Christian culture. Tag Evers praised the book in Sojourners saying that the book "proves that not all writing about CCM has to be as disappointing as the genre itself."

== See also ==
- Body Piercing Saved My Life
