= Tracey Ullman in the Trailer Tales =

American comedy television special

- Written by: Marc Flanagan; George McGrath; Stephen Nathan; Tracey Ullman
- Directed by: Tracey Ullman
- Starring: Tracey Ullman
- Country of origin: United States

Production
- Executive producers: Allan McKeown; Tracey Ullman
- Producer: Stephanie Laing
- Cinematography: Lucas Bielan
- Editors: Tammis Chandler; Edward Ornelas
- Running time: 50 minutes

Original release
- Network: HBO
- Release: August 3, 2003

Related
- Tracey Takes On...

Tracey Ullman in the Trailer Tales is a 2003 HBO television special starring Tracey Ullman in a spin-off from her sketch comedy series Tracey Takes On...

The special, which was originally conceived as a pilot for a possible series, spotlights just one of Ullman's characters: Ruby Romaine, a Hollywood makeup artist in her seventies. Ruby recounts tales of old and present-day Hollywood as celebrities sit in her makeup chair in the on-set hair and makeup trailer. She also reveals details about her personal life; these include living with her "shell-shocked" Vietnam veteran son, Buddy, and their pot-bellied pig, Oinky. The celebrity in Ruby's chair for this special is actress Debbie Reynolds.

The working title for the project was Ruby Romaine, Trailer Trash. This was Ullman's directorial debut (aside from directing second unit on the fourth season of her series Tracey Takes On...).

== Premise ==
Septuagenarian Hollywood makeup artist Ruby Romaine recounts the time she decided to retire and the events that followed, as well as the reason she decided to return to the business.

== Cast ==
- Tracey Ullman as Ruby Romaine / Svetlana / Pepper Kane
- Barbara Bain as Judy Utermeyer
- Maury Chaykin as Dan Weisman
- Paul Dooley as Dean Duaney
- Simon Helberg as Adam, DGA Trainee
- Steven Held as Buddy
- Galen Hooks as Rap Dancer #1
- Leslie Jordan as Rog Monroe
- Jane Kaczmarek as Herself
- Rose Marie as Herself
- Cheech Marin as Himself
- John McKeown as Young Skip
- Sam McMurray as Skip Westland
- Nicki Norris as Young Pepper Kane
- Debbie Reynolds as Herself
- George Schlatter as Himself
- Glenn Shadix as Garland Madden
- Lynne Marie Stewart as Lynn
- M. Emmet Walsh as Wally Westland
- Chris Williams as Assistant Director
- Gary Anthony Williams as Slurr P

== Reception ==
=== Awards and nominations ===
Year	Award	Category	Recipient(s)/Nominee(s)	Result	Ref(s)
2004	Make-Up Artists and Hair Stylists Guild	Best Makeup - Television Mini-Series/Movie of the Week	Matthew W. Mungle, Sally Sutton, Kate Shorter	Won	
2004	Primetime Emmy Awards	Outstanding Hairstyling for a Miniseries, Movie or a Special	Cydney Cornell (key hairstylist), Charlotte Parker (hairstylist)	Nominated	
2004	Primetime Emmy Awards	Outstanding Makeup for a Miniseries, Movie or a Special (Non-Prosthetic)	Sally Sutton (key makeup artist), Kate Shorter (makeup artist)	Nominated	
2004	Primetime Emmy Awards	Outstanding Makeup for a Series, Miniseries, Movie or a Special (Prosthetic)	Matthew W. Mungle (prosthetic makeup), Kate Shorter (prosthetic makeup), Sally Sutton (key makeup)	Nominated	
2004	Primetime Emmy Awards	Outstanding Individual Performance in a Variety or Music Program	Tracey Ullman	Nominated	
