= St Paul's Churchyard =

Marketplace around St Paul's Cathedral, London

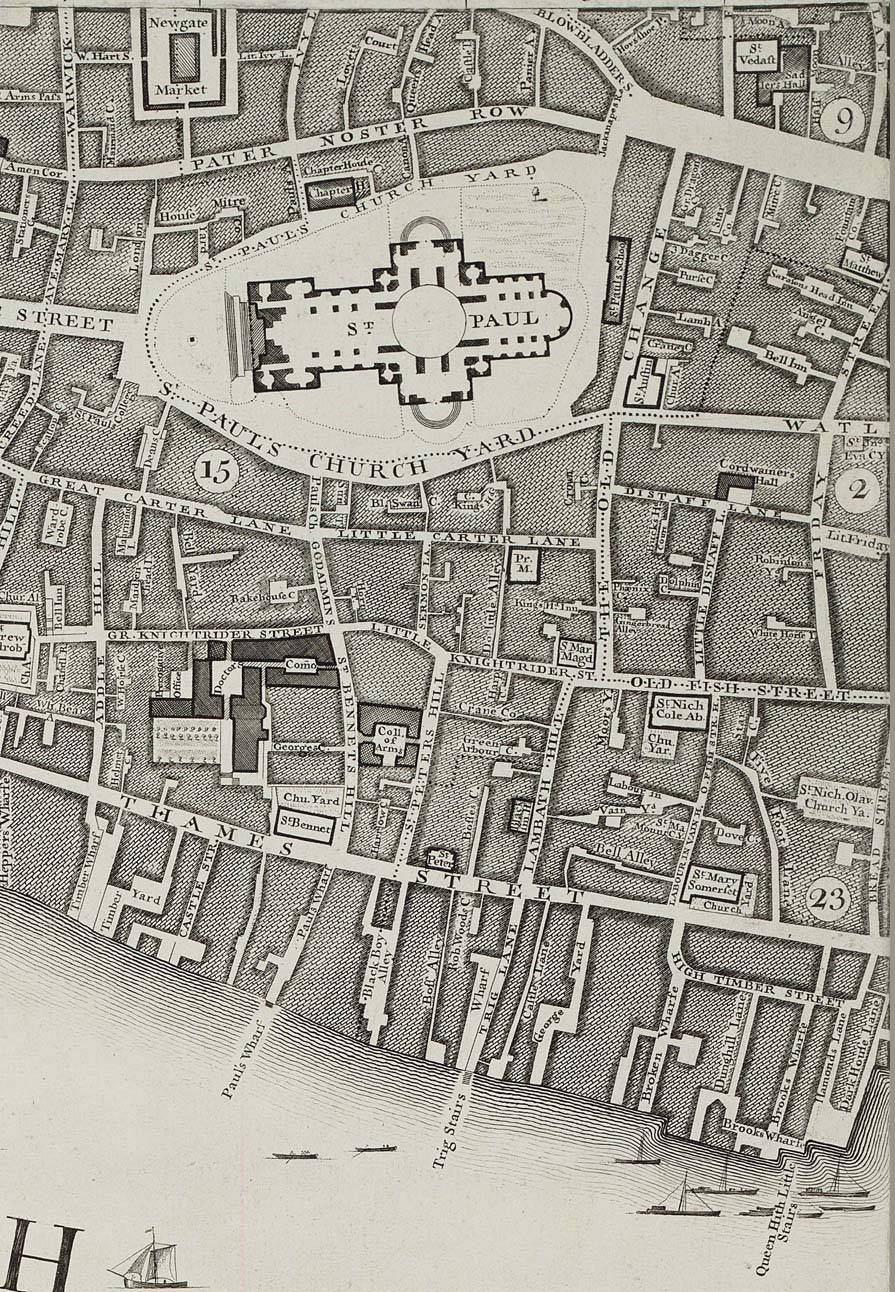
Detail of the Rocque map of London (1746), showing St Paul's Churchyard

St Paul's Churchyard is an area immediately around St Paul's Cathedral in the City of London. Historically it included St Paul's Cross and Paternoster Row. It became one of the principal marketplaces in London. St Paul's Cross was an open-air pulpit from which many of the most important statements on the political and religious changes brought by the Reformation were made public during the sixteenth and seventeenth centuries. Only one execution is recorded as taking place in St Paul's Churchyard; that of clergyman Henry Garnet, one of those found guilty of the 1605 Gunpowder Plot. As of 2024 the alley to the north of the cathedral grounds is named St Paul's Churchyard.

== Book trade ==
With the advent of printing, St Paul's Churchyard became the centre of the book trade in England (later moving to nearby Paternoster Row). It was originally dominated by foreign booksellers. Richard III's only parliament of 1484 passed the act which encouraged them to do business in London. Despite other protectionist measures, the king personally intervened to ensure that printers and booksellers were exempt from these.

The churchyard was also referenced by Alexander Pope in a famous passage from An Essay on Criticism, lines 622–625, where Pope takes on overly talkative and vacuous literary critics (the 'fools'):

No place so sacred from such fops is barred,
Nor is Paul's church more safe than Paul's churchyard:
Nay, fly to altars; there they'll talk you dead:
For fools rush in where angels fear to tread.
