= Harry Whittington (disambiguation) =

Harry Whittington (1927–2023) was an American lawyer, real estate investor, and political figure. He was also known for being shot by former Vice President Dick Cheney.

Harry Whittington may also refer to:

- Harry Whittington (author) (1915–1989), American mystery novelist
- Harry B. Whittington (1916–2010), British paleontologist
