= Fred T. Whitington =

Anglican churchman, Archdeacon of Hobart 1895–1927

Frederick Taylor Whitington (13 June 1853 – 30 November 1938) was an Anglican churchman, Archdeacon of Hobart 1895–1927.

== History ==
Caricature by David Low

Whitington was born in Adelaide, a younger son of eminent merchant, William Smallpeice Whitington, a member of South Australia's influential Whitington family. He was educated at Adelaide Educational Institution, and felt he was destined for the priesthood, but was opposed by his father, who had commercial ambitions for him, and for a time had him working in his father's office, but allowed him to leave to study Law at the University of Adelaide. He left the lawyer's office to work at the South Australian Register, making use of his training as an articled clerk to report on the Adelaide Supreme Court. He was soon promoted to sub-editor, but his religious avocation never left him. On 24 August 1877, at the age of 24 he was ordained by the Bishop of the Anglican Diocese of Adelaide, Dr. Augustus Short, one of the first two men ordained in the Adelaide Cathedral.

His first posting was to the then sparsely settled Port Pirie, followed by a parish in suburban Adelaide, then succeeded George Kennion as bursar of St. Barnabas' Theological College, serving for six years. His next posting was to Kapunda, where he was responsible for churches within an area which stretched along the River Murray to the newly founded town of Renmark.

After visiting England with the Bishop of Brisbane, he accepted in 1891 a position with the missionary staff of the Anglican Diocese of Brisbane, then was appointed the first general secretary of the Australian Board of Missions, for whom he visited the Far North of Australia and New Guinea. During this time that he contracted malaria, and was forced to seek a cooler climate, and in 1893 found his way to Hobart, Tasmania, as assistant-incumbent and canon of St David's Cathedral. When Archdeacon A. N. Mason (c. 1837–1895) died, Whitington was appointed to take his place, holding the additional office of Vicar-General and Administrator of the Diocese of Tasmania in absentia Episcopi, serving for 30 years. During the Great War he was obliged to take his turn as Anglican minister to the Claremont camp, until Rev. J. W. Bethune was appointed permanent camp chaplain, and later appointed OBE.

On his retirement, the Bishop of Tasmania (the Right Rev. Dr R. Snowdon Hay) said: "... His work among us is an example of what may be done when energy, force of character, and patient endurance are added to Christian faith. Tasmania may have a Just pride in one whose devotion, ability and far-reaching influence have made him a prominent figure well-known and honoured throughout the Australian Church."

== Last years ==
On his retirement he retained the office of Vicar General, with the honorary title of Archdeacon. He maintained an interest in the Church, but lived privately, and completed several books. He suffered ill health for many years, being looked after by his daughter Mary Whitington and nurse Rita Mary Webberley, née McKinlay.

== Recognition ==
- The Naval and Military Club made him a life member in recognition of his wartime service.
- He was elected by the Bishops of the General Synod of Australia one of the 12 honorary fellows of the Australian College of Theology.
- He was elected to the Council of the University of Tasmania, on which he served for 18 years.

== Publications ==
- Sermon memorials of the late Rev. W. G. Robinson Sands and McDougall, Adelaide, 1885.
- Some words in memory of Alexander Russell, Dean of Adelaide W. K. Thomas, Adelaide, 1886
- Augustus Short, first bishop of Adelaide : a chapter of colonial church history E. S. Wigg & Son, Adelaide, 1887.
- On the organisation of the Church in Australia The Mercury Office, Hobart 1896
- Ancient and modern church law : a short historical sketch Hobart, 1910
- William Grant Broughton, Bishop of Australia : with some account of the earliest Australian clergy Sydney, 1936.

== Family ==
Whitington married Kate Lisette "Katie" Butler ( – 17 July 1929) in 1878. Katie was a daughter of Sir Richard Butler (1850–1925), and sister of Richard Layton Butler, prominent South Australian politicians. Their children included:

- Theodore Alexander "Alick" Whitington, (10 February 1892 – 5 October 1906). He died after falling from a cliff near Browns River.
- Mary Agnes Whitington (27 June 1879 – 1955) never married and died in Melbourne.
