= Whitington family =

William Smallpeice Whitington was an early English settler in South Australia, founder of the shipping company Whitington & Co. He emigrated on his own ship New Holland (Captain P. Bussell), arriving in South Australia in July 1840. That cargo, which made for him a tidy profit, included Falklandina and Actæon, the colony's first thoroughbred mare and stallion, the basis of John Baker's racing stud. He brought in South Australia's first steamers: Corsair and Courier, and the brig Enterprise for trading between the colony's ports. The ships went into service just as overland routes were opening up, and proved a costly mistake. He later invested in a number of mining ventures, at a substantial loss. His descendants included a number of notable individuals.

== Family ==
William Smallpeice Whitington (c. 1811 – 29 July 1887) married Mary Emily Martin (c. 1822 – 6 October 1903), daughter of Aaron Martin, on 23 January 1840. Their family and descendants included:

- Lucretia Sturt Whitington (3 October 1840 – 11 March 1918) was partially named for her godfather, Charles Sturt.
- George Falkland Whitington (17 March 1842 – 6 May 1883), educated at Adelaide Educational Institution, qualified as a solicitor but several times on the wrong side of the law.
- Peter Whitington (4 February 1845 – 3 July 1932) senior public servant, born at "Surrey Farm", near Balhannah, student at Adelaide Educational Institution, married Jennette Isabella Lyons ( – 12 June 1924) on 20 December 1872. He and Tom Gill were commissioned to report on the public service in 1902.

- Ernest "Ern" Whitington (1873 – 13 April 1934) was a journalist who as "Rufus" wrote the Out Among The People column for The Register, then The Advertiser.
- Bertram Whitington (1875 – 11 March 1953) mining engineer.

- Bertram Lindon "Don" Whitington (31 January 1911 – 5 May 1977) was a noted political journalist and author.

- Percy Whitington (1878–1963) as "P.W." wrote articles "A Jewell Casket" on local history for the Mount Barker Courier and the Murray Valley Standard
- Guy Whitington (23 August 1880 – 5 February 1954) of Unley Park; partner and director of Lion Timber Mills, married Violet Muriel Birrell Haynes

- Alexander Peter Whitington (1905–1983) accountant, married Irene Helene Best in 1925; they divorced in 1940. Then married to Beryl Bradshaw Whitington; they divorced in 1948.
- Richard Smallpeice "Dick" Whitington (30 June 1912 – 13 March 1984), South Australian cricketer best known as a sporting writer. He married Alison Margaret "Peggy" Dale on 19 December 1939; they divorced in 1942.

- Norah Emily Whitington (1883– ) studied music, was living in Hyde Park in 1932
- Louis Arnold Whitington (1888 – 12 October 1917), member of Modern Pickwick Club and lieutenant with 48th Battalion, A.I.F., he was reported killed in action in France but actually survived as a POW. He married Dulcie Antoinette Reid (1904–1981) on 9 June 1926.

- John Bull Whitington (6 September 1846 – 29 December 1892) director, Southern region, South Australian Railways
- Tom Phillipson Whitington 9 December 1849 – 1923
- Frederick Taylor Whitington (13 June 1853 – 30 November 1938) married Kate Lisette "Katie" Butler (1855 – 17 July 1929) on 1 October 1878. She was a daughter of Richard Butler. He was Archdeacon of Hobart 1895–1927.

- Theodore Alexander "Alick" Whitington (10 February 1892 – 5 October 1906) died after falling from a cliff near Browns River, Tasmania
- Mary Agnes Whitington (1879–1955) never married and died in Melbourne.

- R(ichard) McDonnell Whitington (2 June 1856 – 1920) married Eliza Rose Morrison ( – 7 March 1928) on 11 November 1881. He was head teacher at Alma North, Mount Bryan East, Lucieton (now Tantanoola), Robe, then Reynella.

- Ethel May Whitington (11 August 1882 – 1951)
- Arthur Onslow Whitington (4 June 1884 – 14 September 1921) married Elsie Adeline Schubert on 3 July 1912. He was a teacher, born at Alma North, whose teaching career began in 1907 at Gawler, followed by Alberton, Melrose. Salisbury, Tailem Bend, Kadina, Thebarton, and the Observation School on Gilles street, Port Pirie then Gawler again, finally head teacher at Hawker from 1916 to his death.

- Arthur Rex Whitington (6 March 1915 – 2 May 1942) served with RAAF during World War II, was killed in aircraft crash, England.

- Arthur Onslow Whitington (1 November 1857 – 14 May 1919) married Evelyn/Evalin? Amelia Gason (1857 – 20 May 1941) on 31 March 1877. He was secretary, South Australian Jockey Club 1881–1919.

- Hilda Maria/Marie? Whitington (1880–1969)
- Clytie Whitington AMUA (1885 – 17 May 1954) was an accomplished pianist; she and sister Sylvia often appeared in concert together.
- Sylvia Whitington AMUA (1887 – 27 January 1944) was a noted violinist, teacher, and orchestra leader She created the Adelaide Orchestra as a wartime fundraiser 1915–1918. She married Adelaide Conservatorium pianist George Mayo Pearce (1892–1975) on 15 December 1927.
- Gladys Ruby Whitington (1890–1982)
- Edgar Augustine Whitington (1892–1961) married Doris Sheila Temple in 1918; he married again, to Gwyneth Jean Fry in 1936
- Harold Valentine Whitington (1893–1957)

- Florence Blanche Whitington (17 November 1859 – 1942)
