= Mitchel Whitington =

American author

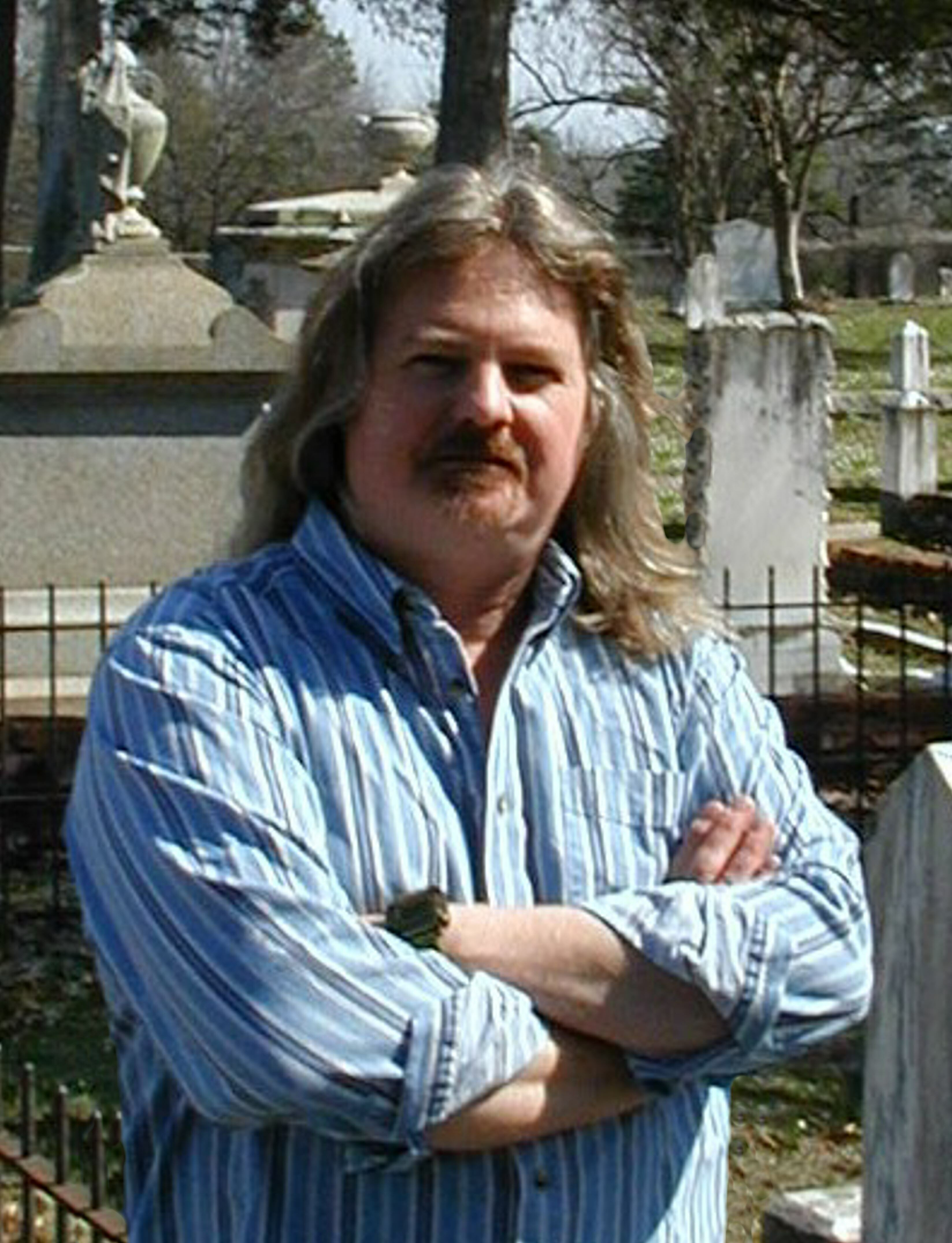
- Mitchel Whitington
- Born: 1959 (age 66–67); Texarkana, Texas, US
- Education: Texas A&M University (B.S., Industrial Engineering - Computing Science, 1982)
- Occupations: writer, speaker, paranormal investigator, publisher
- Spouse: Tami Whitington (1978–present)
- Website: www.whitington.com

Mitchel Whitington (born 1959) is an American author and paranormal researcher with a passion for history. Over three decades of his writing career, he has written many articles and books on the subject of the supernatural. Whitington has researched and explored haunted locations across the United States, and claims to have had many encounters with the supernatural.

Whitington lives with his wife and their two basset hounds at The Grove (Jefferson, Texas), which has been called the most haunted home in the entire state, and is open to the public.

Whitington earned a degree from Texas A&M University, College Station, Texas, in Industrial Engineering with an emphasis in Computing Science, in 1982.

He has written over a dozen published books, mostly non-fiction, ranging from the 1990s non-fiction Debunking the Y2K Terrors and Tales to the comic novel Uncle Bubba's Chicken Wing Fling.

He is a frequent speaker at conferences across the nation, and has appeared on radio and television throughout the United States and Canada. His haunted travel guide series contains regional works including "Ghosts of North Texas" and "Ghosts of East Texas and the Pineywoods", and "A Ghost In My Suitcase: A Guide To Haunted Travel In America".

== Body of Work ==
=== Books by the Author ===
- Debunking the Y2K Terrors & Tales (1998)
- Uncle Bubba's Chicken Wing Fling (2000)
- The Art of the Press Kit (2000)
- The Four-Prong Approach to Book Marketing (2002)
- Ghosts of North Texas (2002)
- Ghosts of East Texas and the Pineywoods (2004)
- A Ghost in My Suitcase (2005)
- Angels of Oakwood (2006)
- 23 - A Country Preacher, His Grandson, and a Devotional That Will Change Your Life (2008)
- Natchez: The History & Mystery of the City on the Bluff (2008)
- No Hope! The Story of the Great Red River Raft (2009)
- Jefferson: The History & Mystery of the City on the Bayou (2011)
- Images of America: Jefferson, Texas (2012)
- The Light at the Top of the Mountain (2013)

=== Anthologies ===
- Spirits of Blue & Gray - Ghosts of the Civil War (1999)
- The Archives of Arrissia (2000)
- 13 Nights of Blood: Legends of the Vampire (2002)
- Haunted Encounters: Real-Life Stories of Supernatural Encounters (2003)
- Haunted Encounters: Personal Stories of Departed Pets (2004)
- Haunted Encounters: Ghost Stories from Around the World (2004)
- Haunted Encounters: Departed Family and Friends (2005)
- Ghostly Tails From America's Jails (2006)
- Nights of Blood 2: More Tales of the Vampire (2009)
- Dead Set: A Zombie Anthology (2010)
- Haunted Texas Highways (2012)
- Civil War Veterans in Oakwood Cemetery (2012)
- Telling Tales of Terror (2012)
- Antebellum Homes of Jefferson (2013)

== National Television Appearances ==
- HGTV's "If Walls Could Talk"
- William Shatner's "Weird or What"
- A&E Biography Channel's "My Ghost Story"
- Animal Planet's "Southern Fried Bigfoot"
- PBS' "The DayTripper with Chet Garner"
- Showtime's "Penn & Teller's Bullsh*t"
- HGTV's "Home, Strange Home"
- HGTV's "America's Creepiest Homes"
