= Body Piercing Saved My Life =

Book about Christian Rock

Body Piercing Saved My Life: Inside the Phenomenon of Christian Rock is a book about Christian rock written by Andrew Beaujon.

== Background ==
The title of the book comes from a T-Shirt that Beaujon saw at the Cornerstone Festival. Beaujon opens the book by discussing interviews that he did with P.O.D. and Switchfoot. The book discusses how the racial demographic of contemporary Christian music is overwhelmingly white. The book discusses the band Pedro the Lion and what Beaujon calls the "gospel of doubt". The book discusses how Christian rock musicians often feel trapped in the Christian music scene. Beaujon is a writer at Spin magazine. The book was published in 2006. Kirkus Reviews called the book "a refreshingly unbiased view of a subject that many jaded journalists would find easy to mock." Gilbert Cruz noted that some of the interviews in the book are too long and tedious, but that overall the book is "fascinating".

== See also ==
- Apostles of Rock
