= Norman Malcolm (journalist) =

Australian journalist

Norman Maxwell Malcolm (13 January 1872 – 6 April 1926) was a journalist in South Australia and Western Australia.

== History ==
Malcolm was born at Gawler, a son of William Malcolm (c. 1841 – 1 November 1888), flourmiller and ostrich farmer and his wife Alice Mary Malcolm née Roberts (c. 1846 – 21 February 1884) who married on 28 November 1866. He was educated at Whinham College, and worked as a farm hand in the mallee country between Bute and Port Broughton. In 1888 he joined staff of The Advertiser, and eight years later started working for the Western Australian Government as a stock inspector.

In 1900 he enlisted with the (Western Australian) Bushmen's Corps for the Boer war, which he survived without injury, and returned to Adelaide and journalism — with The Register — writing sporting columns under the pseudonyms 'High Mark', 'Hat Trick', 'Townacre', and 'Canmore'. He became the first president of the local branch of the Australian Journalists' Association, who nominated him as South Australian candidate to accompany Charles Bean, Donald MacDonald and "Banjo" Paterson as war correspondents. He missed out on the selection however, and enlisted as a private soldier in September 1914, fought at Gallipoli and in Egypt, where he was promoted to the rank of captain. He was returned to Australia as unfit in February 1917 and his appointment terminated. He returned to Western Australia and tried his hand at farming, but his health was poor, and he died after several years' illness.

== Other interests ==
Malcolm had a fine voice, and while in South Australia received tuition from Herr Heuzenroeder and R. Nitschke. He also sang professionally. In his younger days he was a member of the Modern Pickwick Club and was the "life and soul" of many an evening at the "Prince Alfred" and "Sturt" hotels, having a family connection with both.

== Personal ==
Malcolm married Effie Agnes Marshall (28 January 1875 – 6 May 1913) in 1901. She died aged 34. There were no children. Effie was a daughter of merchant James Marshall.

He had an older brother, Douglas Malcolm, in Western Australia, and a sister Ethel Davidson.
