= Ernest Whitington =

Ernest Whitington (1873 – 13 April 1934) was a journalist in South Australia, who as "Rufus" wrote the popular Out among the People column in the Register and The Advertiser when those two newspapers were amalgamated.

Born in Adelaide, a member of the influential Whitington family, Ernest was the eldest son of Peter Whitington, Commissioner for Audit for South Australia, and grandson of William Smallpeice Whitington, a pioneer South Australian pastoralist. Ernest was educated at Whinham College, and his first job was with the Register as an office boy, but quickly impressed his fellow workers with his writing ability and personality. He was a member of The Modern Pickwick Club (as was his brother Louis), and had the gift of making lasting friends of interesting people from all walks of life; his range of interests was equally wide – he was especially fond of horses, dogs, birds, and flowers. He was a prize-winning breeder of game birds, pointer dogs, and roses. He loved outdoor sports, was an authority on horse racing, and was an enthusiastic field shooter. He was also recognised as a discerning theatre and art critic; he was one of the first to recognise the genius in Will Ashton, Hans Heysen, Hayley Lever and H. Septimus Power, among others. He was welcomed as a thoughtful and entertaining reporter at country shows, and was given the responsibility of head of Hansard staff; this was in the days when newspaper staff were seconded to Hansard duties. He was promoted to sub-editor then chief of staff.

From the turn of the C century the conservative Register had been progressively losing subscribers and advertisers to the more egalitarian (and for a time cheaper) Advertiser, and in 1929 in a desperate bid rebranded itself as Register News-Pictorial, changing its focus away from serious reporting. Under the nom de plume "Rufus", (Note: His grandfather W. S. Whitington had written pieces for Pasquin under that alias.) Whitington began his column "Out among the People"; a miscellany of wittily told anecdotes, with liberal helpings of nostalgia and popular history, about all sorts of local identities, famous and obscure, but always engaging, as though these people were all friends, which they probably were. The Great Depression was squeezing business, and The Advertiser, long a major shareholder, in February 1931 absorbed the Register. For seven months The Advertiser and Register was published, incorporating many Register features, including "Out among the People", then the masthead reverted to The Advertiser. Whitington continued with his column for another three years, though declining health meant his column was occasionally penned by others. His last column was published on the same day as his obituary. "Out among the People" continued as a popular column, written or edited by "Vox" – Maurice Stephen Fisher (1887–1968).
