= William London =

17th Century English bookseller and publisher

William London (fl. 1658) was an English bookseller and bibliographer of Newcastle upon Tyne. He is best known for his Catalogue of the most Vendible Books in England of 1657.

== Life ==
Besides running a bookshop and selling other supplies, London published in partnership with London firms. One book of his was Charles Hoole, Phraseologia Anglo-Latina (1655), imprint "London, printed by E. Coles for William London, bookseller, Newcastle".

== Catalogue ==
The full title of London's English bibliography was A Catalogue of the most vendible Books in England orderly and alphabetically digested … the like Work never yet performed by any. Varietas Delectat, London, 1658. London arranged his titles under headings: Divinity, History, Physic and Chirurgerie, Law, Romances, Poems, Plays, Hebrew, Greek, and Latin. A supplement of new books issued between August 1657 and June 1658 was appended. In 1660 he brought out A Catalogue of New Books by way of Supplement to the former, being such as have been printed from that time till Easter Term, 1660, London, 31 May 1660. There had been earlier book lists in England, but one way in which London innovated was by including titles at full length. He listed about 4,500 works.

In 1663 Francis Hawkins issued a new edition of his Youths Behaviour, with a glossary entry "Catalogue: a roule of names, or register, a cataloging of Books which Mr. London, bookseller of Newcastle, hath published."

== Notes ==
Attribution

This article incorporates text from a publication now in the public domain: Lee, Sidney, ed. (1893). "London, William". Dictionary of National Biography. Vol. 34. London: Smith, Elder & Co.
