= List of Tracey Takes On... episodes =

The following is an episode list for Tracey Takes On...

Each episode's long sketches are written in bold; those not in bold represent short character monologues.

"Cut sketches" are those sketches (or monologues) that were either filmed and ended up on the cutting room floor, or sketches or monologues that were written but ultimately discarded before filming commenced. These cut sketches (or monologues) have been confirmed by a variety of outlets: official websites, press releases, series scripts, and the Library of Congress.

== Series overview ==
Season	Episodes	Originally released	
Season	Episodes	First released	Last released
1	10	January 24, 1996	March 27, 1996
2	15	January 18, 1997	April 30, 1997
3	10	January 4, 1998	March 8, 1998
4	12	January 13, 1999	March 17, 1999
Character Comedies	15	—N/a	
Specials	3	1996–98	

== Episodes ==
=== Season 1 (1996) ===
No. overall	No. in season	Title	Directed by	Written by	Original release date	Prod. code
1	1	"Romance"	Thomas Schlamme	Tracey Ullman, Jerry Belson, Dick Clement, Kim Fuller, Jenji Kohan, Ian La Frenais, Molly Newman, Gail Parent, Tony Sheehan, Allan J. Zipper	January 24, 1996	101
Opening voice-over: Romance... Cupid... arrow... Paris... chocolates... saccharine... sugar rush... sappy... Love Boat... Casablanca... this is a fine romance... Rayleen talks about her husband Mitch, a little person. Mrs. Noh Nang Ning explains how romance is like donuts. Virginia reveals the one great romance of her life. **Hope fantasizes about a man in a coffee shop.** Chic talks about dating in Los Angeles. **Fern visits her husband Harry in the hospital. Chris is determined to go public with her relationship with pro-golfer, Midge Dexter.** Harry agrees to retire and move to Florida with Fern. Linda sings "A Fine Romance". Cut sketches: Sydney discusses being wooed by a law student she later hired to be her assistant—Jordan. Janie critiques a magazine piece. Kay discusses the one time she brought a gentlemen home. (Sketch is reworked for the "Character Biographies" section of the book Tracey Takes On (1998)) Trevor has never cried watching Gone with the Wind. (Sketch was reused for the episode "Movies") Virginia finds romance to be a bore. Ruby reveals the lesson she learned from working on the movie The Razor's Edge. Guests stars: Julie Kavner as Midge, Hugh Laurie as Timmy, Michael Tucker as Harry, Danny Woodburn as Mitch
2	2	"Charity"	Thomas Schlamme	Tracey Ullman, Jerry Belson, Dick Clement, Kim Fuller, Jenji Kohan, Ian La Frenais, Molly Newman, Gail Parent, Tony Sheehan, Allan J. Zipper	January 31, 1996	103
Opening voice-over: Charity... begins at home... faith, hope, and... donation... panhandler... pledge... all major credit cards... tax-free... Farm Aid... Live Aid... Deaf Aid... We Are The World... Sweet Charity. Janie talks about feeding the homeless. Hope has been reading to the blind for so long that she's lost her voice. **Fern and Harry put together a charity benefit. Linda makes her directorial debut at Rayleen and Mitch Gibson's ranch for retired animal actors. Kay hires a homeless man.** Ruby's gone to bed with men out of charity. Guest stars: Cheech Marin as Carlos, Michael Tucker as Harry
3	3	"Nostalgia"	Thomas Schalamme	Tracey Ullman, Jerry Belson, Dick Clement, Kim Fuller, Jenji Kohan, Ian La Frenais, Molly Newman, Gail Parent, Tony Sheehan, Allan J. Zipper	February 7, 1996	104
Opening voice-over: Nostalgia... déjà vu... Happy Days... sixties... Beatles... yesterday... Woodstock... Baby Boomers... old-fashioned... the wireless... black-and-white TV... LPs... for the record... nostalgia. Janie attempts to be nostalgic. Mrs. Noh Nang Ning doesn’t like present-day television shows. Kay is nostalgic for the original flavor of Metamucil. **Anya tries to keep the past alive.** Trevor remembers life as a gay man in the 1970s. **Ruby takes part in a documentary about an unfinished movie. Erin remembers recording her first album.** Chic is nostalgic for the 1970s. One-off characters: Anya; Laura Demerol; Alicia Del Mar Cut sketch: Linda sings. (Sketch plays during the closing credits for the "Linda" Character Comedies episode) Guest stars: Sandy Baron as Sheldon Sturges, Roddy McDowall as Rex Gaydon, Michael McKean as Barry
4	4	"Royalty"	Simon Curtis	Tracey Ullman, Jerry Belson, Dick Clement, Kim Fuller, Jenji Kohan, Ian La Frenais, Molly Newman, Gail Parent, Tony Sheehan, Allan J. Zipper	February 14, 1996	109
Opening voice-over: Royalty... Crown Jewels... privilege... peasants... palaces... inbreeding... Miss America... royal jelly... Prince of Wales... Prince of Tides... Artist Formally Known As... royalty. Rayleen hated having to learn the names of the British royal family in school. Fern calls Steve and Eydie the king and queen of good clean music. **Kay buys a used car from a salesman who claims to be the son of royalty.** Ruby tells the "real story" of Grace Kelly. Sydney's message for Princess Diana. Hope proves that there's royalty in America. **Timmy and Virginia host a dinner party for Her Royal Highness.** Trevor talks about having to deal with royalty on a flight once. Linda sings "If I Ruled the World". Notes: In the wake of Diana, Princess of Wales's death, the episode was re-cut with the Sydney Kross sketch omitted and Her Royal Highness's reference to "Diana" removed and replaced with "Fergie". Her Royal Highness's luncheon anecdotes are heavily inspired by the 1994 novel Some Hope by author Edward St Aubyn. Guest Stars: Hugh Laurie as Timmy, Alastair Duncan as Capt. Philip Semdorbin, Alfred Molina as Mr. Dragotti
5	5	"Family"	Thomas Schlamme	Tracey Ullman, Jerry Belson, Dick Clement, Kim Fuller, Jenji Kohan, Ian La Frenais, Molly Newman, Gail Parent, Tony Sheehan, Allan J. Zipper	February 21, 1996	102
Opening voice-over: Family... duty... Christmas... Thanksgiving... guilt... Family Ties... family values... family tree... la familia... Cosa Nostra... all in the... keep it in the... Sly and the... family. Fern tells us that having children ruined her life. Virginia approves of her family's discipline. Kay talks about the advice her mother gave her. Rayleen and Mitch discuss contraceptives. Sydney volunteers for Big Brothers Big Sisters of America. Chic deals with his brother. **Mrs. Noh Nang Ning takes her granddaughter ice skating.** Ruby talks about her family. **A female crew member wants Trevor to be the father of her child.** Fern talks about looking at condos with Harry. **Hope shows her student film.** Linda talks about her family at Alcoholics Anonymous. Cut sketch: Sydney says that family is the bedrock of her entire defense practice. (Sketch appears in the book Tracey Takes On (1998) in the chapter "Family") Guest stars: Julie Brown as Mrs. Heiner, Joanna Gleason as LeAnne, and Michael McKean as Barry
6	6	"Law"	Simon Curtis	Tracey Ullman, Jerry Belson, Dick Clement, Kim Fuller, Jenji Kohan, Ian La Frenais, Molly Newman, Gail Parent, Tony Sheehan, Allan J. Zipper	February 28, 1996	107
Opening voice-over: Law... order... sheriff... high noon... judge... jury... Twelve Angry Men... sequestered... appeal... constitution... Murphy's Law... Burke's Law... above the law... outside the law... the law according to... me. Mrs. Noh Nang Ning was once sued over a bad donut. Hope talks about two college students who were caught stealing. **Sydney defends a woman who was scalded after sitting on a container of soup.** Ruby teaches Buddy how to make money from a lawsuit. **Fern and Harry help catch a criminal living in their condo complex.** Mrs. Noh Nang Ning says that lawyers are like bagels, "You don't want nothing to do with them." Cut sketch: Virginia discusses police. (Sketch appears in the book Tracey Takes On (1998) in the chapter "Crime") Guest stars: Joshua Malina as Jordan, Bruce McGill as Michael Morris Daveen, Michael Tucker as Harry, Jack Conley as Ray
7	7	"Vanity"	Simon Curtis	Tracey Ullman, Jerry Belson, Dick Clement, Kim Fuller, Jenji Kohan, Ian La Frenais, Molly Newman, Gail Parent, Tony Sheehan, Allan J. Zipper	March 6, 1996	108
Opening voice-over: Vanity... facelifts... toupees... hair plugs... collagen shots... penile implants... diet... thin... trim... lean... mirror, mirror, on the wall... vanity. Chic reveals his grooming habits. Fern reveals what's on the vanity licence plate that Harry bought for her. Virginia says that Americans are vain. **Kay gets a makeover for a wedding.** Mrs. Noh Nang Ning likens sprinkles on donuts to vanity. Ruby says that men are more vain than women. **Sydney debuts a new hairdo for court.** Trevor recounts a discussion he had with a plastic surgeon. **Janie arrives on the set of a photo shoot.** Rayleen discusses what not to do when performing a stunt. Linda talks about plastic surgery. Guest stars: Stanley DeSantis as Albert Pittman, Joshua Malina as Jordan
8	8	"Death"	Simon Curtis	Tracey Ullman, Jerry Belson, Dick Clement, Kim Fuller, Jenji Kohan, Ian La Frenais, Molly Newman, Gail Parent, Tony Sheehan, Allan J. Zipper	March 13, 1996	106
Opening voice-over: Death... black... widows... coffins... cremation... grief... relief... Death of a Salesman... The Grateful Dead... critics... vultures... carcass... tie-dyed... The Day the Music Died... death. Trevor reveals the procedure for when a passenger dies on a plane. Mrs. Noh Nang Ning says that life and death is like a donut. **Virginia knows what must be done in light of Timmy's recent scandal. Ruby makes up the body of a woman she fought with years go. Kay has a near-death experience.** Death doesn't scare Rayleen. Cut sketches: Sydney says that the rights of the dead must always be protected. Janie recommends that the wives of politicians always travel with a simple black dress. Hope discusses finding a dead body rolled up in a rug. (Sketch was reused for the episode "Crime") Guest stars: Udo Kier as Klaus, Hugh Laurie as Timmy, Derrick O'Connor as Kay's Father
9	9	"Health"	Nicola Pecorini	Tracey Ullman, Jerry Belson, Dick Clement, Kim Fuller, Jenji Kohan, Ian La Frenais, Molly Newman, Gail Parent, Tony Sheehan, Allan J. Zipper	March 20, 1996	110
Opening voice-over: Health... an apple a day... healthy mind... healthy body... feeling blue... turning green... sugar-free... fat-free... salt-free... taste free... at least you have your... health. Kay's home remedies. Chic doesn't waste his time working out. **Sydney is urged to take a vacation; she visits a health spa where Janie, Rayleen, and Linda are also staying.** Mrs. Noh Nang Ning's morning ritual. **Fern and Harry are forced to deal with their unexpressed rage.** Ruby has to get a mammogram. Cut sketch: Virginia on the British diet. (Sketch was reused for the episode "Food") Guest stars: Ron Canada as Lawrence, Julie Kavner as Jobie, Joshua Malina as Jordan, Michael Tucker as Harry, Todd Waring as Manager
10	10	"Fame"	Thomas Schlamme	Tracey Ullman, Jerry Belson, Dick Clement, Kim Fuller, Jenji Kohan, Ian La Frenais, Molly Newman, Gail Parent, Tony Sheehan, Allan J. Zipper	March 27, 1996	105
Opening voice-over: Fame...Nobel Prize... cover of Time... prima donna... fifteen minutes... Andy Warhol... David Bowie... I'm going to live forever... I'm turning into a monster... where are they now... fame. Chic talks about all the famous people he's had in his cab. Sydney says that lawyers are now celebrities. Kay remembers cashing a check for a criminal at her bank. Mrs. Noh Nang Ning has had a lot of famous people visit her shop. **Linda decides that in order to get her career back on track she should hire a stalker to stalk her for publicity. Unfortunately, a real stalker shows up unbeknownst to her.** The show concludes with breaking the fourth wall with Rayleen doing Tracey's stunts as Linda for the episode. Tracey comes out of her makeup trailer to watch before leaving for home. Cut sketches: Virginia recounts a rude rock star that she had to lock in the cellar. (Reused and then unused sketch for the episode "Music") Hope reveals that if she could invite one famous person, living or dead, to dinner who it would be: "It would definitely be Golda Meir... But I would invite Jesus over for desert." (Sketch appears in the book Tracey Takes On (1998) in the chapter "Fame") Ruby acts as an extra on the set of Tracey Takes On..., which she is only doing as a favor to the producer of the show. (This is part of the Linda Granger sketch.) Ruby on celebrities who make the leap from show business to politics. (Sketch was reused for the episode "Politics") Guest stars: Seymour Cassel as Candy, Jon Favreau as Douglas, Alex Karras as himself

Additional notes: The following sketches were cut and are known to have been filmed: Hope is sold to a prince at an auction (sketch featured actress Pamela Adlon and was reworked for the book Tracey Takes On (1998) in the chapter "Royalty"); Ruby hates working non-union films (outtake is featured as a bonus on Tracey Takes On... Romance, Sex, Fantasy VHS)

=== Season 2 (1997) ===
The first season's opening voice-over bed sequence is abandoned for this season. Tracey now opens the show with a story in relation to each episode's subject. Tracey and the show's characters lip-sync to her 1983 song, "They Don't Know", which now serves as the show's new theme song and opening title sequence.

No. overall	No. in season	Title	Directed by	Written by	Original release date	Prod. code
12	1	"Sex"	Thomas Schlamme	Tracey Ullman, Jerry Belson, Dick Clement, Robert Klane, Jenji Kohan, Ian La Frenais, Molly Newman, Gail Parent, Allen J. Zipper	January 18, 1997	202
Tracey has nothing to say about her sex life. Sydney says that men can't see her as a sexual being. Hope knows exactly how she will lose her virginity. Birdie believes that sex education should be taught at home and not in school. **Linda falls off the wagon and onto the cable guy.** Fern and Jobie discuss sex. Hope continues her virginity story. Kay has never had sex. **Ruby arrives on the set of a pornographic film.** Hope is interrupted by her roommate. **Chic talks about the first time he had sex.** First appearance: Birdie Godsen Guest stars: Julie Kavner as Jobie, Bruce Kirby as Dean, Jack Conley as Nick, Wayne Péré as Geraldo
13	2	"Fantasy"	Thomas Schlamme	Tracey Ullman, Jerry Belson, Dick Clement, Robert Klane, Jenji Kohan, Ian La Frenais, Molly Newman, Gail Parent, Allen J. Zipper	January 26, 1997	203
Tracey reveals her childhood fantasy of meeting Paul McCartney. Fern and Jobie discuss the new pool man. Trevor fantasies about being an air steward on a space shuttle. **Sydney fantasizes about killing a priest in order to win a case.** Tracey meets Her Royal Highness. **Ruby gets abducted by aliens.** Mrs. Noh Nang Ning dances after closing. Rayleen talks about writing in to Penthouse Forum. One-off character: Sydney's mother Guest stars: Julie Kavner as Jobie, Ron Canada as Lawrence, Alastair Duncan as Pip, Danny Woodburn as Mitch
14	3	"Mothers"	Michael McKean	Tracey Ullman, Jerry Belson, Dick Clement, Robert Klane, Jenji Kohan, Ian La Frenais, Molly Newman, Gail Parent, Allen J. Zipper	February 2, 1997	209
Tracey visits her mother. Ruby talks about her children. Mrs. Noh Nang Ning takes her granddaughter to a baseball game. **Janie fears that her children hate her.** Birdie talks about her son's birthday. **Ruby meets her great-granddaughter.** Her Royal Highness meets Mother Teresa. **Fern and Harry await the arrival of their new grandchild.** Chic talks about bringing his mother over from the old country. Tracey has second thoughts about the show's opening and revisits her mother. Note: First appearance of actor George Segal as Harry Rosenthal, replacing actor Michael Tucker. Guest stars: Melinda Dillon as Desirée, George Segal as Harry
15	4	"Vegas"	Don Scardino	Tracey Ullman, Jerry Belson, Dick Clement, Robert Klane, Jenji Kohan, Ian La Frenais, Molly Newman, Gail Parent, Allen J. Zipper	February 8, 1997	211
Tracey and Allan are off to Vegas. **Trevor announces that Virginia and Timmy's plane will be rerouted to Las Vegas. Linda Granger prepares for her comeback. Ruby arrives to help an old friend. Trevor arrives at his Vegas magician friends' mansion. Chic drops off Timmy and Virginia. Hope takes in the sights and sounds of Vegas. Linda is interviewed about her Vegas comeback. Virginia bathes. Trevor decides to see Linda Granger's show. Hope takes a ride in Chic's cab. Timmy gambles with Fern. Hope interviews a stripper for her school project. Linda prepares for the show. Timmy visits a strip club. Hope takes the stage. Hope gives Timmy a lap dance. Trevor enters the show with Sasha, a tiger. Linda performs. Sasha attacks Linda. Virginia and Timmy leave. Hope says goodbye to Nik. Trevor meets a bandaged Linda at the airport.** Sydney announces she's taking Linda's case. Note: First appearance of actor Tim McInnerny as Timothy Bugge, who takes over the role from Hugh Laurie. Guest stars: Seymour Cassel as Candy, Tim McInnerny as Timmy, Bradley Whitford as Nik
16	5	"Secrets"	Thomas Schlamme	Tracey Ullman, Jerry Belson, Dick Clement, Robert Klane, Jenji Kohan, Ian La Frenais, Molly Newman, Gail Parent, Allen J. Zipper	February 17, 1997	205
Tracey reveals her secret bathroom. Kay talks about the time she tried to hide a parrot from her mother. **Linda's daughter Marmalade wants to find her birth parents.** Chic reveals the secrets of the customers who tipped badly. Her Royal Highness meets Salman Rushdie. Fern and Jobie discuss their secrets. **Janie reveals her desire to be spanked to her psychiatrist.** Rayleen was born with a penis. Birdie's husband tells her what goes on in his top secret militia meetings. Guest stars: Seymour Cassel as Candy, Kristin Dattilo as Marmalade, Julie Kavner as Jobie, Ron Perlman as Stuart
17	6	"Childhood"	Thomas Schlamme	Tracey Ullman, Jerry Belson, Dick Clement, Robert Klane, Jenji Kohan, Ian La Frenais, Molly Newman, Gail Parent, Allen J. Zipper	February 24, 1997	201
Tracey exhibits some of her childhood toys and what she used to like to do as a child. Chic recounts coming to America as a child. **Rayleen was raised by dingoes.** HRH meets her old governess. **Mrs. Noh Nang Ning recounts being an orphan in her homeland and escaping to America.** Janie explains why she hasn't written a book. Sydney has been abrasive since she was a child. **Trevor remembers growing up in Northern England.** Ruby matured at an early age. Guest stars: Judy Geeson as Elsie Ayliss, John Mahoney as Geoffrey Ayliss, Olivia Newton-John as herself
18	7	"1976"	Thomas Schlamme	Tracey Ullman, Jerry Belson, Dick Clement, Robert Klane, Jenji Kohan, Ian La Frenais, Molly Newman, Gail Parent, Allen J. Zipper	March 5, 1997	204
Tracey has a blowout on an old pair of platform shoes. Mrs. Noh Nang Ning explains why 1976 was a very big year in the history of donuts. **It's New Year's Eve and Manhattan Review Magazine is preparing a new issue: Why 1996 is 1976 Redux. Janie Pillsworth has hired Hope Finch as an intern. Hope and Janie ride in Chic's cab to the New Year's Eve party that is taking place at his cousin Momo's discount carpet warehouse. Chic reveals to Hope how Janie started her career on New Year's Eve in 1976, how he got his hack license, and what led to Linda Granger being killed off of her hit 1970s television show V.I.P. Lounge. Hope confronts Janie with Chic's accusations and is fired. Linda isn't impressed with Manhattan Review's nostalgia issue in which she's featured.** Ruby reveals that she was the one who ruined Linda's career. Guest star: Seymour Cassel as Candy
19	8	"Food"	Don Scardino	Tracey Ullman, Jerry Belson, Dick Clement, Robert Klane, Jenji Kohan, Ian La Frenais, Molly Newman, Gail Parent, Allen J. Zipper	March 12, 1997	213 (Note: The episodes "Food" and "Movies" are both registered with the production code 213.)
Tracey cooks for the crew. Mrs. Noh Nang Ning cooks eel. Ruby on frozen TV dinners. **Janie loses her favorite table at a restaurant.** Fern has to watch her diet. **Chic's cab cafe.** Sydney on eating meat before a trial. Linda thinks about food anytime she's in the lady's room. Virginia on the British diet. **Trevor and Barry argue over dinner.** Birdie sees a government conspiracy on the back of her children's cereal box. HRH meets Paul Newman. Guest stars: Michael McKean as Barry, Natalija Nogulich as Paige, Jim Fyfe as Businessman #1, Timothy Busfield as Businessman #2
20	9	"Crime"	Don Scardino	Tracey Ullman, Jerry Belson, Dick Clement, Robert Klane, Jenji Kohan, Ian La Frenais, Molly Newman, Gail Parent, Allen J. Zipper	March 19, 1997	212
Tracey is arrested. HRH meets O. J. Simpson. There are no unsolved crimes in Mrs. Noh Nang Ning's homeland. **Kay is suspected of being involved in a string of bank robberies.** Fern on crime - 'is it gonna hurt the Jews?' Chic runs a little side business. **Linda is reunited with her stalker, Douglas.** Ruby was arrested once. **Timmy and Virginia pick up the wrong bag at the airport.** Hope discusses finding a dead body rolled up in a rug. Birdie counsels death row inmates. Guest stars: Jon Favreau as Douglas, Tim McInnerny as Timmy, John Spencer as Ray Weggerly
21	10	"Movies"	Don Scardino	Tracey Ullman, Jerry Belson, Dick Clement, Robert Klane, Jenji Kohan, Ian La Frenais, Molly Newman, Gail Parent, Allen J. Zipper	March 26, 1997	213
Tracey reveals her favorite movies to watch on wet Sunday afternoons in bed. HRH meets Demi Moore. Fern loved to go to the movies when she was dating. **Ruby gets lost at the cinema.** Everything Mrs. Noh Nang Ning learned about America she learned from watching movies. **A film crew takes over the Bugge estate.** Trevor has never cried from watching Gone with the Wind. **Rayleen saves the day at a film premiere.** Kay remembers the first time she went to the cinema on her own. Chic on renting S.O.B. Sydney knows they'll eventually make a movie about her life. Cut sketch: Birdie censors films for family viewing. Guest stars: Tim McInnerny as Timmy, John Stamos as Rob Trasca, Alastair Duncan as Pip
22	11	"Money"	Michael McKean	Tracey Ullman, Jerry Belson, Dick Clement, Robert Klane, Jenji Kohan, Ian La Frenais, Molly Newman, Gail Parent, Allen J. Zipper	April 2, 1997	210
Tracey sees the show's viewers as shareholders. HRH meets Shaquille O'Neal. **Chic is audited by the IRS.** Ruby explains why this is a lousy country. **Harry and Fern invest in ostrich farming.** Birdie explains her husband Robert's job. **Linda sells her line of recovery dolls on the Family Spending Channel.** Rayleen's inventions. Guest stars: Richard Dimitri as Abbie Ben-Svi, Steve Landesberg as Mr. Hart, Jo Ann Harris as Fawn Loving, George Segal as Harry
23	12	"Race Relations"	Michael McKean	Tracey Ullman, Jerry Belson, Dick Clement, Robert Klane, Jenji Kohan, Ian La Frenais, Molly Newman, Gail Parent, Allen J. Zipper	April 9, 1997	207
Tracey is an equal opportunity offender. Virginia is furious with the Blacks. Fern talks about the conflict between African Americans and Jews. **Linda takes part in a theater production of Driving Miss Daisy. Kay acts as jury forewoman.** Rayleen acts as stuntwoman for Whoopi Goldberg. **Kay tries to bring order to the jury room.** Trevor remembers serving Nelson Mandela. **The jury has reached a verdict – on what to eat. Harry agrees to take part in a rap music video.** Chic remembers picking up Johnnie Cochran. Mrs. Noh Nang Ning remembers the donut store she opened in South Central. **Harry and Fern watch the music video.** Sydney has no problem hiring minorities. Guest stars: Lawrence Hilton-Jacobs as James, George Segal as Harry, Harry Shearer as Ronald Littleman
24	13	"Supernatural"	Michael McKean	Tracey Ullman, Jerry Belson, Dick Clement, Robert Klane, Jenji Kohan, Ian La Frenais, Molly Newman, Gail Parent, Allen J. Zipper	April 16, 1997	206
Tracey would love to believe in the supernatural. Trevor recalls having a "Twilight Zone" experience. Janie has visions of what's going to be hot or not. **Chris makes a pact with a devil to improve Midge's handicap. Fern and Harry's maid puts a hex on them.** Chic doesn't believe in the supernatural. Cut sketches: Sydney dreams that Tyrone Power's ghost wants her to take on a lawsuit for him. Linda does a television commercial for her new project "The Psychic Buddies Network". (A brief glimpse of this sketch can be seen in the closing credits of the episode "Best of II") Guest stars: Matt Frewer as Bob, Whoopi Goldberg as God (voice), Marga Gomez as Bettina, Julie Kavner as Midge, George Segal as Harry, Amy Alcott as herself
25	14	"Politics"	Michael McKean	Tracey Ullman, Jerry Belson, Dick Clement, Robert Klane, Jenji Kohan, Ian La Frenais, Molly Newman, Gail Parent, Allen J. Zipper	April 23, 1997	208
Tracey introduces her all-female cabinet. Chic doesn't understand why everyone freaks out when a politician is caught having an affair. Virginia believes the last great British Prime Minister was Margaret Thatcher. Mrs. Noh Nang Ning says people vote how they're told in her homeland. **Trevor recounts a co-worker who was having an affair with a married United States senator.** Ruby on celebrities who make the leap from show business to politics. **Fern challenges Jobie for condo board president.** Birdie is getting ready for W.H.H. (We Hate Hillary Club). Final appearance: Virginia Bugge Cut sketch: HRH meets President Bill Clinton (sketch appears in the book Tracey Takes On (1998) in the chapter "Politics") Guest stars: Nicolas Coster as Senator Randall Stevens, Julie Kavner as Jobie, George Segal as Harry, Marcia Strassman as Mallory Blair
26	15	"Music"	Don Scardino	Tracey Ullman, Jerry Belson, Dick Clement, Robert Klane, Jenji Kohan, Ian La Frenais, Molly Newman, Gail Parent, Allen J. Zipper	April 30, 1997	215
Tracey makes a discovery about the gold disc she was awarded for sales of her album You Broke My Heart in 17 Places. HRH meets Bob Dylan. **Sydney sings to the jury. Chic picks up an opera singer. Linda gives a pep talk. Erin is reunited with her band Wisechild.** Cut sketches: Virginia recounts a rude rock star that she had to lock in the cellar. (Previously unused sketch for "Tracey Takes On... Fame") Hope remembers meeting singers from the Lollapalooza tour. Notes: Rusty is changed to Dusty (Roads). This is the first appearance of actress Mo Gaffney as Dusty, who takes over the role from actress Kate McGregor-Stewart. Guest stars: Mo Gaffney as Dusty, Calvin Remsberg as Tutiliani, The Roches as themselves

=== Season 3 (1998) ===
No. overall	No. in season	Title	Directed by	Written by	Original release date	Prod. code
28	1	"Marriage"	Michael Lange	Tracey Ullman, Jerry Belson, Dick Clement, Ian La Frenais, George McGrath, Molly Newman, Gail Parent, Allen J. Zipper	January 4, 1998	307
Tracey discusses her wedding day. Chic discusses his thoughts on same-sex marriage. Hope reveals the pact she made with her best friend. **Sydney convinces Kay to marry her prison pen pal who's on death row.** Erin talks about marriage and rock and roll. **Ruby meets her new daughter-in-law. Sheneesha gives advice to a newlywed couple.** Trevor talks about marrying Barry in Hawaii. Linda talks about her many marriages but only gets up to 1981. First appearance: Sheneesha Turner Cut sketch: Fern laments the tragic outcome of her 33-year marriage to Harry. Guest stars: Maury Chaykin as Kurt Rasmussen, Paul Dooley as Agent Ivan Hamel, Mo Gaffney as Dusty, Adele Givens as Hellura, Hiep Thi Le as Milou
29	2	"Hollywood"	Don Scardino	Tracey Ullman, Jerry Belson, Dick Clement, Ian La Frenais, George McGrath, Molly Newman, Gail Parent	January 11, 1998	305
Tracey discusses her thoughts on Hollywood. **Chic decides to head to Hollywood with the script Penny Marshall left behind in his cab. Fern arrives in Hollywood after having won a contest to appear on Dr. Quinn, Medicine Woman. Ruby is interviewed by Huell Howser. Chic visits Mrs. Noh Nang Ning's donut shop. Fern isn't happy with how she's being treated on the set. Chic gets a ride from Sydney. Ruby talks about Joan Crawford. Chic visits Candy. Fern films her first scene and ends up walking off the set in disgust. Ruby talks about the Hollywood Sign. Chic arrives at Sydney's penthouse. Linda arrives at the Lady Legends of Hollywood Awards. Chic talks to Joan van Ark. Ruby works on Jane Seymour. An angry Sydney makes a bomb threat resulting in Chic being detained. Sydney arrives on the scene and announces in front of cameras that she'll be taking Chic's case.** Cut sketch: Mrs. Noh Nang Ning recounts being yelled at by a film director. (Monologue restored in the "Mrs. Noh Nang Ning" Character Comedies episode) Guest stars: Seymour Cassel as Candy, Erik Estrada as himself, Huell Howser as himself, Joe Lando as himself, Kelly Lange as herself, Penny Marshall as herself, Melissa Rivers as herself, Joan van Ark as herself
30	3	"Smoking"	Don Scardino	Tracey Ullman, Jerry Belson, Dick Clement, Ian La Frenais, George McGrath, Molly Newman, Gail Parent	January 18, 1998	303
Tracey talks about smoking as a teenager and why she eventually quit. Hope is caught smoking. Mrs. Noh Nang Ning puts nicotine in her donuts. **Kay tries to score some marijuana for her invalid mother. Linda recalls how smoking nearly destroyed her life. Ruby can't find a place to smoke.** Chic won't allow passengers to smoke in his cab. Cut sketch: Trevor discusses his chain-smoking Uncle Stan and his deathbed request. Guest stars: Cheech Marin as Carlos, Nick Scotti as Johnno
31	4	"Loss"	Don Scardino	Tracey Ullman, Jerry Belson, Dick Clement, Ian La Frenais, George McGrath, Molly Newman, Gail Parent	January 25, 1998	301
Tracey talks about losing her daughter Mabel's umbilical cord. Ruby talks about losing her television remote control. HRH meets The Rolling Stones. Janie experienced the sexual side effects of antidepressants. **Fern discovers that Harry's been eaten by an alligator.** Trevor discusses losing his hair after getting his hair dyed. Mrs. Noh Nang Ning reveals how to lose weight. Sheneesha can still have children despite standing next to the airport x-ray machine. **Rayleen learns the awful truth at Mitch's funeral.** Chic's lost and found policy. Hope discusses losing her virginity. **Sydney loses her first case.** Kay lost her youth by looking after her mother. Guest stars: Julie Kavner as Jobie, Kevin Cooney as Judge, Maddie Corman as Sheila, Nada Despotovich
32	5	"Agents"	Don Scardino	Tracey Ullman, Jerry Belson, Dick Clement, Ian La Frenais, George McGrath, Molly Newman, Gail Parent	February 1, 1998	302
Tracey talks about her crazy agent. HRH meets Pierce Brosnan. Birdie is an agent for Militial M'Lady. **Fern discovers what really happened to Harry.** Trevor talks about being a travel agent. **Linda decides to become her own agent.** Ruby reveals that she was once a secret agent for the FBI. Cut sketches: Chic tries to get into the adult entertainment industry as Johnny Deep. Mrs. Noh Nang Ning reveals other uses for Agent Orange. Guest stars: Seymour Cassel as Candy, Julie Kavner as Jobie, Jack Kehler, Michael Tucker as Harry, Kristin Dattilo as Marmalade, Stanley DeSantis as Bobby
33	6	"Age"	Don Scardino	Tracey Ullman, Jerry Belson, Dick Clement, Ian La Frenais, George McGrath, Molly Newman, Gail Parent	February 8, 1998	304
Tracey talks about aging. Mrs. Noh Nang Ning reveals how aging is lucrative for business. Rayleen doesn't know how old she is. Sheneesha and Hellura discuss how black women age better than white women. **Hope dates her professor.** Sydney freezes her eggs. Birdie reveals her theory of thirty-three. **Fern receives a fatal marriage proposal.** HRH meets Macaulay Culkin. **Trevor feels that Barry has settled into middle age.** Ruby talks about Buddy's pig. Cut sketch: Linda goes to an underground license renewal shop. Note: An official press release announced Carlos Mencia as guest starring in this episode despite his not appearing in it. Guest stars: Judy Geeson as Dorothy Appleton, Joanna Gleason as Katherine Hawkins, Michael McKean as Barry, Austin Pendleton as Professor Kenneth Hawkins, Al Ruscio as Otto Cornowitz, Adele Givens as Hellura
34	7	"Religion"	Michael Lange	Tracey Ullman, Jerry Belson, Dick Clement, Ian La Frenais, George McGrath, Molly Newman, Gail Parent, Allen J. Zipper	February 15, 1998	310
Tracey loves religious television. Hope recalls discussions about religion in college. Ruby explains why she was kicked off the set of The Greatest Story Ever Told. Sydney reveals her favorite Bible passage. **Birdie kidnaps her niece Chris Warner and puts her into a homosexual deprogramming compound run by her twin brother, Sandy.** Fern is elated that Madeleine Albright is Jewish. **Linda finds god after meeting a writer who wants to cast her in a television pilot.** Kay recalls going with her mother to see Benny Hinn. HRH meets the Pope. One-off character: Sandy (Birdie's preacher twin brother) Cut sketches: Rayleen explains why she crosses herself before every stunt and how she admires Jesus doing his own stunts. Mrs. Noh Nang Ning discusses religion in her home country and their religious burial rites. Fern tells an off-color religious joke. Guest stars: Dan Butler as Priest, Seymour Cassel as Candy, Julie Kavner as Midge, Scott Thompson as Matthew, George McGrath as Jonathan Meade, Brent Briscoe as Lyle the Redneck
35	8	"Man's Best Friend"	Michael Lange	Tracey Ullman, Jerry Belson, Dick Clement, Ian La Frenais, George McGrath, Molly Newman, Gail Parent	February 22, 1998	309
Tracey talks about her dogs. Birdie lets the family dog loose. **Trevor helps Linda smuggle her dog into London.** Fern says that Jews and pets don't mix. **Ruby is attacked by her neighbor's dog. Erin writes a song.** Mrs. Noh Nang Ning doesn't understand why Americans will eat donuts but not dogs. Tracey's children talk her into keeping the dog. Final appearance: Mrs. Noh Nang Ning Cut sketch: Kay would like to adopt the lost dog but Mother's allergic. Guest stars: Mo Gaffney as Dusty, Bruce Kirby as Dean
36	9	"Culture"	Michael Lange	Tracey Ullman, Jerry Belson, Dick Clement, Ian La Frenais, George McGrath, Molly Newman, Gail Parent, Allen J. Zipper	March 1, 1998	306
Tracey gives viewers a tour of London. Ruby recalls seeing Miss Saigon with Buddy. Birdie homeschools her children. Fern talks about her pearls. **Hope tries to lose her virginity to a Scottish poet. Sydney Riverdances.** Chic makes art with items left behind by passengers. **Linda tries to secure funding for the arts. Sheneesha gets a man to agree to publish her book.** Trevor gossips about the cabin crews from different airlines. Rayleen is tired of people not knowing enough about Australian culture. Kay talks about her mother's various cultures. Cut sketch: Mrs. Noh Nang Ning describes Asian opera. Guest stars: René Auberjonois as William Catesby-Jones, Billy Connolly as Rory Cassidy, Helen Mirren as Professor Horen, Adele Givens as Hellura
37	10	"Sports"	Michael Lange	Tracey Ullman, Jerry Belson, Dick Clement, Ian La Frenais, George McGrath, Molly Newman, Gail Parent, Allen J. Zipper	March 8, 1998	308
Tracey reveals her exercise routine. Chic reveals his homeland's national sport. Linda reveals the source of her phobia about organized sports. **Ruby meets an old flame at the race track.** Fern reveals how she got out of taking part in gym class. **Janie competes for a fashion award with an old rival. Erin has a flashback.** HRH meets Pete Sampras. Trevor cheated in a school sports competition. Cut sketches: Sheneesha invites herself to a famous basketball player's house to discuss her son's career ('He's kind of a cross between Shaquille O'Neal and Batman'). Mrs. Noh Nang Ning tells us about her champion racing cricket - the 'Exterminator'. Trevor explains that gay men, though very enthusiastic about exercise, are rarely interested in sports. Guest stars: Mo Gaffney as Dusty, Jennifer Jason Leigh as Paige Garland, M. Emmet Walsh as Jimmy Duff, Jack Conley as Tough Guy, Todd Oldham as himself

=== Season 4 (1999) ===
No. overall	No. in season	Title	Directed by	Written by	Original release date	Prod. code
39	1	"Dating"	Dennie Gordon	Tracey Ullman, Jerry Belson, Dick Clement, Ian La Frenais, George McGrath, Jenji Kohan, Gail Parent	January 13, 1999	401
Tracey explains why she didn't go on a lot of dates growing up. Janie dictates her idea of the perfect date. Kay explains post-dated checks. **Sydney tries a dating service.** Rayleen accepts a date from a co-worker. Ruby recalls her daughter dating an African American man. **Erin tries to convince Dusty not to go out on a date.** Trevor talks about dating in the 1970s. Madam Nadja remembers when she started dating. Chic describes the perfect date. **Linda meets an old flame.** First appearance: Madam Nadja Cut sketch: Fern goes on her first date in 30 years with an ex-mobster. Note: This episode aired back-to-back with "Drugs". Guest stars: Corbin Bernsen as Jack, Mo Gaffney as Dusty, Mark DeCarlo, Jo Ann Harris (as Joanne Belson) as Sascha Winkle
40	2	"Drugs"	Dennie Gordon	Tracey Ullman, Jerry Belson, Dick Clement, Ian La Frenais, George McGrath, Jenji Kohan, Gail Parent	January 13, 1999	405
Tracey discusses hiring actors who have been rumored to be on drugs. Ruby talks about her botched hip replacement. **Erin discovers her drug dealer's new enterprise.** Chic reveals the drug policy in his native homeland. **Sheneesha forgets her blood pressure medication. Chris discovers that Midge is taking steroids.** Madam Nadja talks about drugs ruining her girls. **Kay gets addicted to swing dancing.** Linda comes up with a creative way to list all the drugs she's been addicted to over the years. Cut sketches: Sydney explains why downers aren't for her. Birdie consults the Bible for drug problem solutions. Fern gives her view on the over-availability of drugs. Note: This episode aired back-to-back with "Dating". Guest stars: Howard Hessman as Todd, Julie Kavner as Midge, Adele Givens as Hellura, Marissa Ribisi as Denise
41	3	"Scandal"	Dennie Gordon	Tracey Ullman, Jerry Belson, Dick Clement, Ian La Frenais, George McGrath, Jenji Kohan, Gail Parent	January 20, 1999	402
Tracey discusses a scandal involving an ex-boyfriend. **Fern is touched by a dentist**. Hope turned in two students who were selling past exams. **Sydney finds a hair in her bed.** Madam Nadja talks about her black book. **Janie has an affair with one of her daughter's classmates**. Linda talks about paparazzi. Cut sketch: Chic reminisces on his "almost" wedding. Note: This episode aired back-to-back with "Hair". Guest stars: Julie Kavner as Jobie, Natalija Nogulich as Paige, Bruce McGill as Richard Templeton, Sam McMurray as Dentist, Liz Torres as Phyllis, Tim Osawa (as Tim Os) as Dante
42	4	"Hair"	Dennie Gordon	Tracey Ullman, Jerry Belson, Dick Clement, Ian La Frenais, George McGrath, Jenji Kohan, Gail Parent	January 20, 1999	404
Tracey talks about Elton John's hair. Kay talks about the time when she considered getting a new hairdo. **Linda gets a part in Hair.** Ruby talks about dying her hair and the stories behind each color. **Trevor remembers getting a Beatles-style haircut.** Madam Nadja talks about waxing. **Fern learns that her hairstylist has died. Erin gets her hair stuck to a tree.** Cut sketches: Chic makes a discovery. Birdie has an enlightening. Sheneesha arrives at work suffering terribly from a "too tight" hairdo. Notes: This episode aired back-to-back with "Scandal". It marks the first and only appearance of W. Morgan Sheppard as Geoffrey Ayliss, who takes over the role from John Mahoney. Guest stars: Seymour Cassel as Candy, Richard Dimitri as Monsieur Andre, Mo Gaffney as Dusty, Judy Geeson as Elsie Ayliss, Gary Oldman as Hairdresser, W. Morgan Sheppard as Geoffrey Ayliss
43	5	"Lies"	Todd Holland	Tracey Ullman, Jerry Belson, Dick Clement, Ian La Frenais, George McGrath, Jenji Kohan, Gail Parent	January 27, 1999	407
Tracey talks about plastic surgery and lying on the internet. Hope remembers the lies she believed as a kid. **Fern finds out that Harry had an affair. Sheneesha gives Hellura some advice.** Madam Nadja talks about the Beverly Hills police department. **Chic lies to get out of a speeding ticket.** Sydney never lies. Ruby calls her daughter to discuss a story printed in a tabloid. Trevor remembers a Pinocchio-inspired porn film. Linda sings about her age. Guest stars: Jerry Adler as Murray, Paul Dooley as Cop, Michael Tucker as Harry, Adele Givens as Hellura, Julio Oscar Mechoso, Liz Torres as Phyllis, Mary Lynn Rajskub as Traffic School Girl
44	6	"Erotica"	Todd Holland	Tracey Ullman, Jerry Belson, Dick Clement, Ian La Frenais, George McGrath, Jenji Kohan, Gail Parent	February 3, 1999	408
Tracey reveals the most erotic thing she's ever done, as well as reading erotic literature. Madam Nadja on the most erotic part of a woman's body. Hope reveals why she chose to learn Spanish. **Janie accepts a sculpture from an artist.** Fern takes a closer look at a statue. **Chic uses a hidden camera in his cab. Linda accepts an invitation from a sultan.** Ruby doesn't have erotic dreams—unless she watches Mannix before bedtime. Trevor discusses the mile high club. Cut sketch: Shopping for a present leaves Kay flustered. Guest stars: Seymour Cassel as Candy, Richard Dimitri, Natalija Nogulich as Paige, Marissa Ribisi, Rusty Schwimmer, Carre Otis as herself, Victoria Principal as herself, Steve Jones as Adrian Rudge
45	7	"Books"	Dennie Gordon	Tracey Ullman, Jerry Belson, Dick Clement, Ian La Frenais, George McGrath, Jenji Kohan, Gail Parent	February 10, 1999	403
Tracey talks about marketing her book. Trevor reads The Royals by Kitty Kelley. **Linda records an audio book.** Janie talks about a poet she once lived with. **Kay finds love at the library.** Madam Nadja predicts what would happen if she published a book. **Fern tries to retrieve a book that she lent to a friend who's died.** Chic read a book once. Birdie hosts a book burning barbecue. Rayleen knows how to get respect from fellow stunt people. Cut sketches: Sydney keeps a journal. Literature expert Hellura suggests Della Reese's new book, Angels Along the Way, for good reading. Guest stars: Stanley DeSantis as Bobby, Chris Elliott as Gilbert Bronson, Len Lesser, Liz Torres as Phyllis
46	8	"Road Rage"	Todd Holland	Tracey Ullman, Jerry Belson, Dick Clement, Ian La Frenais, George McGrath, Jenji Kohan, Gail Parent	February 17, 1999	409
Tracey admits she suffers from road rage sometimes. **Sydney buys a Hummer. Fern and Jobie rent a car. Ruby peels out. Hope spots her car that was stolen. Linda rides in a helicopter with her new boyfriend, traffic reporter, Chopper Tim. Midge experiences a bad case of road rage with Chris. Fern and Jobie pick up their car. Sydney talks about what she'd like to do with her new vehicle. Linda and Chopper Tim report the latest on the car chase. Ruby is carjacked. Hope decides to take her car back. Linda and Chopper Tim report on the carjacking. Ruby notices that she must be on the news and decides to take a shortcut. Sydney tries running people down. Hope feels guilty about taking her car. Jobie tries to give Fern directions. Fern and Sydney's cars collide. Ruby swerves, tossing her carjacker from her vehicle. Hope and Roberto look on. Linda and Chopper Tim arrive on the scene to conduct interviews. Ruby and Linda argue. Back home, Ruby watches herself on television.** Cut sketch: Erin gets caught in a traffic jam and writes a song. Guest stars: Julie Kavner as Jobie and Midge, Clea Lewis as Carol, Charles Rocket as Chopper Tim, Maulik Pancholy as Roberto, Wayne Péré as Maniac, Jack Conley as Eric
47	9	"America"	Todd Holland	Tracey Ullman, Jerry Belson, Dick Clement, Ian La Frenais, George McGrath, Jenji Kohan, Gail Parent	February 24, 1999	411
Tracey shows her green card and reveals her thoughts on America. Kay was changed by America. **Ruby recalls having an affair with Joe McCarthy.** Erin hates America. **Fern is reunited with a mobster she knew back on Long Island.** Birdie remembers winning a pageant. Sheneesha and Hellura discuss carry-on luggage. Cut sketches: Rayleen tells the story of how she came to America. Sydney explains why America's a great country. A campaign speech for Hope. Janie explains why she has no intention of becoming an American citizen, even though she's lived here for years. Linda describes her proudest moment as an American. Guest stars: Mo Gaffney as Dusty, Jeffrey Tambor as Sam, Michael Tucker as Harry, Adele Givens as Hellura, Robert Sacchi, Liz Torres as Phyllis, Adam Biesk
48	10	"Hype"	Todd Holland	Tracey Ullman, Jerry Belson, Dick Clement, Ian La Frenais, George McGrath, Jenji Kohan, Gail Parent	March 3, 1999	412
Tracey remembers Fox hyping her image. **HRH has an appointment with a spin doctor. Ruby has Buddy compete in a contest to win a truck.** Madam Nadja talks about what she doesn't like about America. Fern invests in caskets. Sheneesha and Hellura remember the airport trying to hype up its new design. **Linda takes part in reverse marketing for the new film adaptation of her television series V.I.P. Lounge.** Cut sketches: Erin gives a twist on self-promotion. Chic believes the "Disneying" of Times Square is bad for the city. Trevor has his own personal grooming wand. Guest stars: Leeza Gibbons as herself, Caroline Aaron as Bev Mellis, Seymour Cassel as Candy, James Gammon as Uncle Shep, Adele Givens as Hellura, Michael Milhoan as Al
49	11	"Obsession"	Todd Holland	Tracey Ullman, Jerry Belson, Dick Clement, Ian La Frenais, George McGrath, Jenji Kohan, Gail Parent	March 10, 1999	410
Tracey talks about being obsessed with the World Cup. Chic has a cheaper alternative to the Calvin Klein perfume Obsession. **Sydney gets revenge on her high school classmates. Trevor and Barry compete in a dance competition.** Ruby reveals the plot to the film Magnificent Obsession. HRH says that obsession is not an emotion that the Royal family indulges in. Sheneesha and Hellura talk about Steven Spielberg's stalker. Kay's obsession with Beanie Babies. One-off character: Marigold (Trevor and Barry's dance instructor) Cut sketches: More on how to get on the road to riches from Madam Nadja. Fern and her resemblance to Sandra Bullock. Linda describes her bout with obsessive-compulsive disorder. Guest stars: Noel Harrison as Johnny, Michael McKean as Barry, Adele Givens as Hellura, Finola Hughes as Josie
50	12	"The End of the World"	Dennie Gordon	Tracey Ullman, Jerry Belson, Dick Clement, Ian La Frenais, George McGrath, Jenji Kohan, Gail Parent	March 17, 1999	406
Tracey reveals how she'd like the world to end. **Roberto tells Hope that a meteor is headed straight towards Earth. Ruby isn't going to be fooled again after The War of the Worlds. Fern freaks out over the news. Trevor and Barry decide what they'd like to do with their last two days on Earth. Birdie prays with her children. Sydney calls Jordan. Trevor and Barry travel to Mule Creek, New Mexico and make a pit stop at a dinner. Linda stops in to see Candy. Janie ends up in Chic's cab – again. Hope agrees to lose her virginity to Roberto. Kay's mother dies. Birdie lets her hair down. Sydney prepares for liftoff. Sheneesha calls for calm. Linda performs. Fern and Jobie pig out. Sydney orbits into space. Fern and Jobie lose the herring. Trevor and Barry prepare for their Thelma and Louise ending. Linda sings "Last Dance". The countdown begins: Ruby's asleep; Hope and Roberto begin having sex—bang! Ruby wakes up alarmed. It didn't happen. Trevor and Barry stop just in the nick of time with their car hanging over the edge of a cliff. Hope is thrilled; Roberto not so; Fern must have gained ten pounds; Janie is disgusted with herself for having slept with Chic. Ruby has a news crew at her house—what remains of the meteor landed on her front lawn. Birdie gathers her children. Sydney sends an SOS from the Mir space station.** Guest stars: Seymour Cassel as Candy, Julie Kavner as Jobie, Michael McKean as Barry, Adele Givens as Hellura, Kathryn Joosten as Diner Waitress, Bob Costas as himself, Maulik Pancholy as Roberto

=== Character Comedies ===
These "best of" character episodes, originally produced in 1998, were never aired on television. Two of them found themselves on home video in 1999, Fern & Kay. Others were released as bonus features on the show's DVD releases. In 2012, all 15 episodes were released through the American subscription streaming media service Hulu. Each episode features Ullman talking about the character and introducing each sketch.

No. overall	No. in season	Title
51	1	"Linda"
**Linda and Candy hire a stalker. Linda is reunited with her stalker, Douglas. Linda falls off the wagon and onto the cable guy.** Linda talks about her many marriages but only gets up to 1981. Linda sings. Restored sketch: Linda sings. (Sketch originally from "Tracey Takes On... Nostalgia") Guest stars: Seymour Cassel as Candy, Jack Conley as Nick, Jon Favreau as Douglas
52	2	"Chic"
Chic reveals his grooming habits. **Chic talks about the first time he had sex. Chic's cab cafe. Chic heads to Hollywood with his hot property.** Chic is nostalgic for the 1970s. Guest stars: Jim Fyfe as Businessman #1, Timothy Busfield as Businessman #2
53	3	"Kay"
**Kay buys a used car from a salesman who claims to be the son of royalty. Kay hires a homeless man. Sydney convinces Kay to marry her prison pen pal who's on death row.** Kay talks about the time she tried to hide a parrot from her mother. Guest stars: Maury Chaykin as Kurt Rasmussen, Cheech Marin as Carlos, Alfred Molina as Mr. Dragotti
54	4	"Janie"
**Janie's early school days.** (Tracey Ullman: A Class Act) Janie talks about feeding the homeless. **Janie reveals her desire to be spanked to her psychiatrist.** Janie has visions of what's going to be hot or not. Guest stars: Michael Palin as Frank, Ron Perlman as Stuart
55	5	"Mrs. Noh Nang Ning"
**Mrs. Noh Nang Ning recounts being an orphan in her homeland and escaping to America.** Mrs. Noh Nang Ning explains why 1976 was a very big year in the history of donuts. Mrs. Noh Nang Ning reveals how aging is a lucrative for business. Mrs. Noh Nang Ning cooks eel. Mrs. Noh Nang Ning's morning ritual. Mrs. Noh Nang Ning reveals how to lose weight. **Mrs. Noh Nang Ning takes her granddaughter ice skating.** Mrs. Noh Nang Ning likens sprinkles on donuts to vanity. Mrs. Noh Nang Ning recounts being yelled at by a film director. Chic visits Mrs. Noh Nang Ning's donut shop. Mrs. Noh Nang Ning doesn't understand why Americans will eat donuts but not dogs. Mrs. Noh Nang Ning dances after closing. Tracey removes her makeup. Restored sketches: Mrs. Noh Nang Ning recounts being yelled at by a film director. (Monologue originally cut from "Tracey Takes On... Hollywood") Guest stars: Julie Brown as Mrs. Heiner
56	6	"Fern: The Early Years"
**Fern's daughter gets married.** (Tracey Ullman Takes on New York) **Fern visits her husband Harry in the hospital.** Fern talks about looking at condos with Harry. **Fern and Harry put together a charity benefit.** Fern reveals what's on the vanity licence plate that Harry bought for her. Guest star: Michael Tucker as Harry
57	7	"Fern & Harry"
Fern and Jobie discuss sex. **Fern discovers that Harry's been eaten by an alligator. Fern discovers what really happened to Harry.** Fern loved to go to the movies when she was dating. Guest stars: Julie Kavner as Jobie, Jack Kehler, Michael Tucker as Harry
58	8	"Hope"
Hope has been reading to the blind for so long that she's lost her voice. **Hope fantasizes about a man in a coffee shop.** Hope discusses losing her virginity. **Hope takes in the sights and sounds of Vegas. Hope takes a ride in Chic's cab. Hope interviews a stripper for her school project. Hope takes the stage. Hope gives Timmy a lap dance. Hope says goodbye to Nik. Hope dates her professor.** Hope is caught smoking. Hope recalls college discussions about religion. Hope reveals the pact she made with her best friend. Guest stars: Joanna Gleason as Katherine Hawkins, Tim McInnerny as Timmy, Austin Pendleton as Professor Kenneth Hawkins, Bradley Whitford as Nik
59	9	"Virginia"
Virginia and Timmy are interviewed. (Tracey Ullman: A Class Act) **Timmy and Virginia host a dinner party for Her Royal Highness. Virginia knows what must be done in light of Timmy's recent scandal. A film crew takes over the Bugge estate.** Virginia reveals the one great romance of her life. Guest stars: Hugh Laurie as Timmy, Tim McInnerny as Timmy, Michael Palin as Timmy, John Stamos as Rob Trasca
60	10	"Rayleen"
**Rayleen was raised by dingoes.** Rayleen arrives on the set. **Linda makes her directorial debut at Rayleen and Mitch Gibson's ranch for retired animal actors. Rayleen learns the awful truth at Mitch's funeral.** Rayleen is tired of people not knowing enough about Australian culture. Rayleen hated having to learn the names of the British royal family in school. Guest star: Danny Woodburn as Mitch
61	11	"Trevor"
**Trevor remembers growing up in Northern England. A female crew member wants Trevor to be the father of her child. Trevor feels that Barry has settled into middle age.** Trevor remembers serving Nelson Mandela. Guest stars: Judy Geeson as Elsie Ayliss, Joanna Gleason as LeAnne, John Mahoney as Geoffrey Ayliss, Michael McKean as Barry
62	12	"Sydney"
**Sydney sings to the jury. Sydney fantasizes about killing a priest in order to win a case. Sydney is urged to take a vacation; she visits a health spa where Janie, Rayleen, and Linda are also staying. Sydney Riverdances.** Sydney on eating meat before a trial. Guest stars: Ron Canada as Lawrence, Joe Malone, Todd Waring as Manager
63	13	"Chris"
**Chris is determined to go public with her relationship with pro-golfer, Midge Dexter. Chris makes a pact with a devil to improve Midge's handicap.** Guest stars: Julie Kavner as Midge, Matt Frewer as Bob
64	14	"Ruby"
Ruby matured at an early age. **Ruby meets her great-granddaughter. Ruby arrives on the set of a pornographic film. Ruby gets abducted by aliens.** Ruby talks about her children. Guest stars: Melinda Dillon as Desirée, Bruce Kirby as Dean
65	15	"Ruby: Part 2"
**Ruby gets lost at the cinema. Ruby meets her new daughter-in-law. Ruby meets an old flame at the race track.** Ruby reveals that she was once a secret agent for the FBI. Guest stars: Paul Dooley as Agent Ivan Hamel, Hiep Thi Le as Milou, M. Emmet Walsh as Jimmy Duff

=== Specials (1996–98) ===
Each season of Tracey Takes On... includes a one-hour "Best of" special, with the exception of Season 4.

No. overall	No. in season	Title	Original release date	Prod. code
11	11	"The Best of Tracey Takes On..."	January 18, 1997	111
Opening voice-over: Romance... charity... nostalgia... royalty... family... law... vanity... death... health... fame... the best of... Linda's car crashes. Rayleen prepares as Tracey's stunt double. **Chris is determined to go public with her relationship with pro-golfer, Midge Dexter.** Mrs. Noh Nang Ning explains how romance is like donuts. Chic is nostalgic for the 1970s. **Fern and Harry put together a charity benefit.** Hope has been reading to the blind for so long that she's lost her voice. Kay remembers cashing a check for a criminal at her bank. **Timmy and Virginia host a dinner party for Her Royal Highness.** Fern calls Steve and Eydie the king and queen of good clean music. Sydney says that lawyers are now celebrities. **A female crew member wants Trevor to be the father of her child.** Ruby has to get a mammogram. Hope dances with the man in the coffee shop. Notes: An extended or full version of the first season's theme song plays over a collection of clips from the first season's episodes after Tracey's opening voice-over bed sequence. The sketch "One Night Stand" (from "Tracey Takes On... Family") has a bit from "Tracey Takes On... Fame" added to it (Linda Granger flying coach). Guest stars: Michael Tucker as Harry, Julie Kavner as Midge, Michael McKean as Barry, Joanna Gleason as LeAnne, Hugh Laurie as Timmy
27	16	"Best of II"	January 26, 1997	216
Tracey meets Her Royal Highness. Mrs. Noh Nang Ning cooks eel. Ruby talks about her children. Chic runs a little side business. Trevor remembers serving Nelson Mandela. Fern talks about the conflict between African Americans and Jews. **Rayleen was raised by dingoes.** Fern and Jobie discuss sex. **Trevor remembers growing up in Northern England.** Birdie is getting ready for W.H.H. (We Hate Hillary Club). **Linda falls off the wagon and onto the cable guy.** Sydney says that men can't see her as a sexual being. Kay remembers the first time she went to the cinema on her own. **Harry and Fern invest in ostrich farming.** Janie has visions of what's going to be hot or not. **Ruby meets her great-granddaughter.** Sydney sings to the jury. Mrs. Noh Nang Ning dances after closing. Linda dances to "V.I.P. Vicki". Notes: An extended version of "They Don't Know" is used for the opening title character lip sync sequence. The show's closing uses the first season's theme song in lieu of a reprise of "They Don't Know" along with bloopers from the second season. Guest stars: Jack Conley as Nick, Melinda Dillon as Desirée, Richard Dimitri as Abbie Ben-Svi, Judy Geeson as Elsie Ayliss, Julie Kavner as Jobie, John Mahoney as Geoffrey Ayliss, George Segal as Harry, Mitchell Whitfield as Allan
38	11	"Best of III"	June 4, 1998	311
Chic reveals his homeland's national sport. **Ruby meets an old flame at the racetrack.** Trevor discusses losing his hair after getting his hair dyed. **Kay tries to score some marijuana for her invalid mother. Janie competes for a fashion award with an old rival.** Sheneesha and Hellura discuss how black women age better than white women. **Sydney Riverdances.** Birdie lets the family dog loose. **Fern receives a fatal marriage proposal. Linda recalls how smoking nearly destroyed her life.** HRH meets Macaulay Culkin. **Sydney Kross convinces Kay to marry her prison pen pal who's on death row.** Ruby reveals that she was once a secret agent for the FBI. Linda talks about all her marriages but only gets up to 1981. Note: The show's closing uses the first season's theme song in lieu of a reprise of "They Don't Know" along with bloopers from the third season. Guest stars: Maury Chaykin as Kurt Rasmussen, Adele Givens as Hellura, Jennifer Jason Leigh as Paige Garland, Cheech Marin as Carlos, M. Emmet Walsh as Jimmy Duff, Nick Scotti as Johnno, Marissa Ribisi as Angie
