= Tracey Takes On... =

American comedy television series

- Genre: Sketch comedy
- Created by: Tracey Ullman; Allan McKeown
- Written by: Various: Tracey Ullman; Jerry Belson; Dick Clement; Kim Fuller (season 1); Jenji Kohan (seasons 1–2 & 4); Ian La Frenais; Molly Newman (seasons 1–3); Gail Parent; Tony Sheehan (season 1); Allan J. Zipper (seasons 1–3); Robert Klane (season 2); George McGrath (seasons 3–4)
- Directed by: Various: Thomas Schlamme; Simon Curtis; Nicola Pecorini; Don Scardino; Michael McKean; Michael Lange; Dennie Gordon; Todd Holland; Tracey Ullman (Note: Second unit for season 4 only)
- Starring: Tracey Ullman
- Opening theme: "They Don't Know" (seasons 2–4)
- Ending theme: "They Don't Know" (seasons 2–4)
- Composers: Richard Gibbs; Philip Giffin; Steve Hampton; Randy Kerber
- Country of origin: United States
- Original language: English
- No. of seasons: 4
- No. of episodes: 65 (list of episodes)

Production
- Executive producers: Allan McKeown; Tracey Ullman
- Producers: Various: Jamie Lynn Arsenault; Kevin Berg; Jerry Belson; Dick Clement; Carey Dietrich; Kim Fuller; Robert Klane; Jenji Kohan; Ian La Frenais; Stephanie Laing; George McGrath; Sandra McKerroll; Molly Newman; Gail Parent; Thomas Schlamme; Tony Sheehan; Tom Sherren; Allen J. Zipper
- Production locations: Los Angeles, California; The Culver Studios (Season 3)
- Cinematography: Lucas Bielan; Mauro Fiore; Nicola Pecorini
- Editors: Tammis Chandler; Barry Dresner; Scott Gamzon; Simeon Hutner
- Camera setup: Single-camera
- Running time: 22–60 minutes
- Production companies: Home Box Office; Takes On Productions, Inc.; WitzEnd Productions

Original release
- Network: HBO
- Release: January 24, 1996 – March 17, 1999

Related
- The Tracey Ullman Show; Tracey Ullman: A Class Act; Tracey Ullman Takes on New York; Tracey Ullman in the Trailer Tales

Tracey Takes On... is an American sketch comedy series starring Tracey Ullman. The show ran for four seasons on HBO and was commissioned following the success of the 1993 comedy special Tracey Ullman Takes on New York. Each episode focuses on a specific subject which Ullman and her cast of characters take on through a series of sketches and monologues.

Unlike her previous Fox show, Tracey Takes On... was filmed using a single-camera setup on location without a studio audience. The show also features a steady rotation of nearly twenty characters—unlike The Tracey Ullman Show, which featured upwards of one hundred, the majority of whom appeared only once.

In 1998, a book based on the series, Tracey Takes On, was released. The character Ruby Romaine was spun off into the HBO television special Tracey Ullman in the Trailer Tales in 2003.

== Premise ==
Tracey Ullman and her cast of characters tackle a different subject in each episode.

== Production ==
=== Conception and development ===
Ullman with three of her Tracey Takes On... characters (L–R): Kay Clark, Hope Finch, Ullman, and Linda Granger for the Got Milk? advertising campaign in 1999

In 1990, Ullman's husband, Allan McKeown, a founding member of the Meridian Broadcasting consortium, placed a bid for the ITV television franchise in South East England. Along with the bid, he included a potential programming lineup which featured a Tracey Ullman special. Ullman, who had just ended four seasons of The Tracey Ullman Show, had just given birth to her second child and was quite content staying at home. In September 1991, McKeown was elated when he was informed that his bid was successful; he was subsequently responsible for all of Meridian's comedy programming. Ullman dreaded the idea of doing another show. "I was really not prepared to do TV again. I had an extraordinary run at Fox in the late '80s with the Tracey Ullman Show, and couldn't imagine putting forth that amount of energy again. [...] The type of makeups I liked to disguise myself under had not been conducive to a live show [...] Once I inhaled so much remover that I passed out on the makeup room floor. I was resuscitated and went out to give a terrific performance, even though I can't remember being there." She had a year to deliver the show. The 1993 special Tracey Ullman: A Class Act, a satire about the British class system, was shot entirely on location and co-starred actor Michael Palin. The show's success led to the American cable television network HBO becoming interested in having Ullman do a special for them. The only caveat was that she take on a more "American" subject. She chose New York City. That special, Tracey Ullman Takes on New York, was an award-winning success. HBO then broached the idea of a "Takes on" series.

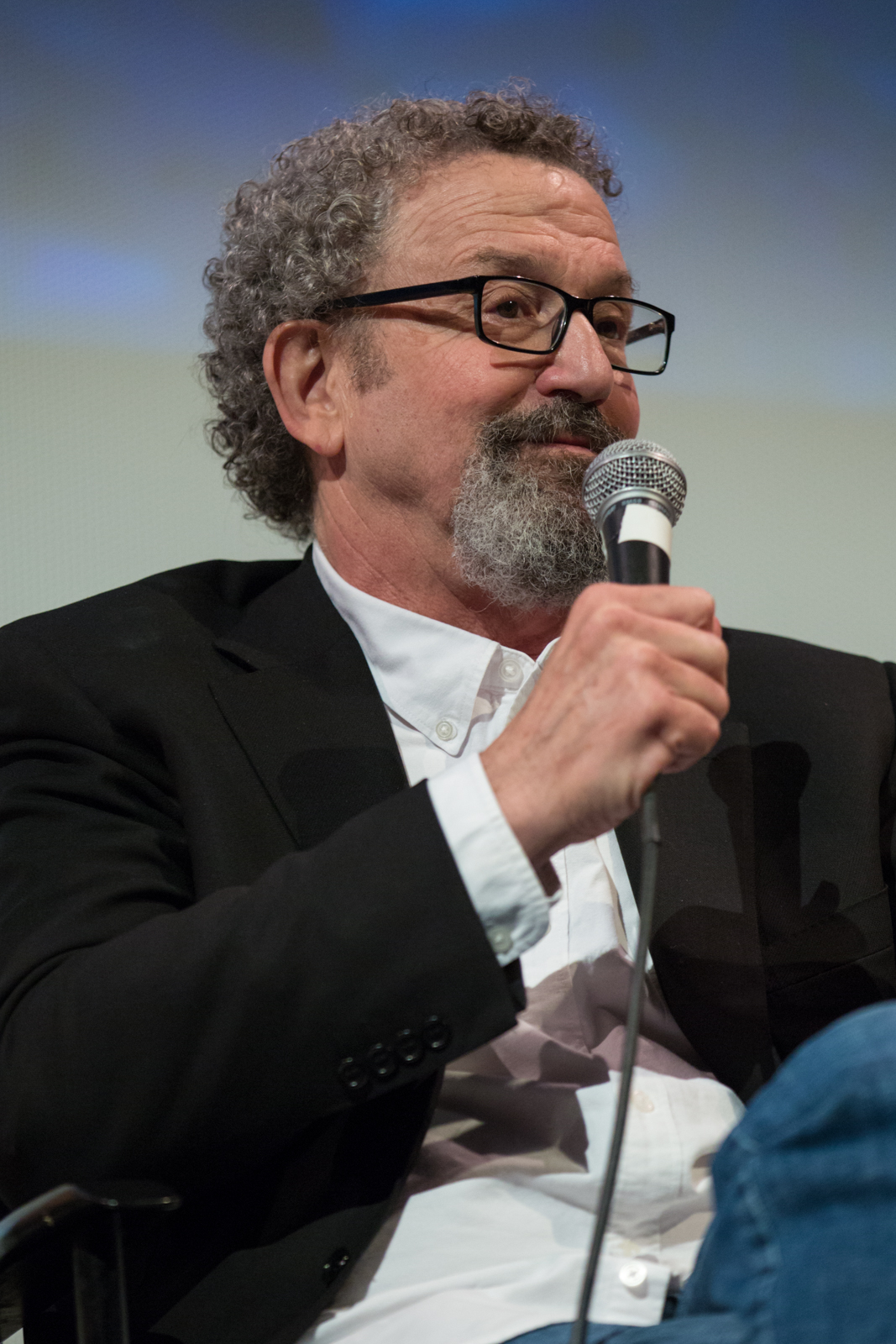
Thomas Schlamme directed and produced many of the show's episodes.

Ullman was unsure if she could do it without the help of her "mentor", James L. Brooks, who helped launch her American career with The Tracey Ullman Show. "Last year, I was 35 years old, and I thought, 'It's time to do it myself really. I thought, 'I know the premise, I know what I want to do...' I sat at the head of the table and made myself a boss."

Production on the first season of Tracey Takes On... took place in Los Angeles in 1995. Characters created for her previous two HBO comedy specials were carried over for the series: gay airline steward Trevor Ayliss, British Conservative MP wife Virginia Bugge, British magazine editor Janie Pillsworth, Long Island housewife Fern Rosenthal, and faded Hollywood actress Linda Granger.

I wanted to do a show where you could get familiar with the characters, where I could express a point of view, where we could get controversial ... I also didn't want to do a series where I had to do 22 or 26 episodes a year. I have two children and have a husband, and there are other things I'd like to do during the year. Ten shows is a good number, and HBO gives me a great [artistic] freedom.

— Tracey Ullman in 1996

Ullman was thrilled with the artistic freedom working in cable television allotted her, specifically HBO. "If we did the story line with me and [Julie Kavner] as gay golfers on network TV, Johnson & Johnson would pull their advertising, then there'd be a big piece in USA Today, and it would be a headache. HBO let us have fun with it, and when Julie and I come out at the end, it's in the most wonderful way. Our Romance show may be a bit sappy, but it's more of a battle theme, something that will get people talking."

=== Writing and filming ===
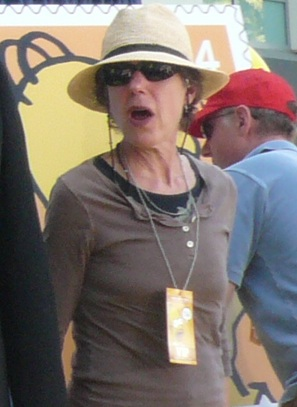
Actress Julie Kavner appeared in many episodes of the show.

Production on a new season of Tracey Takes On... began each year in February with a staff retreat. Three months would then be spent writing the scripts. Pre-production would follow in July and August, with filming commencing in September and wrapping in November. The completed season would "ideally" be delivered to HBO by December.

=== Format ===
A typical episode consists of two or three long sketches with interstitial character monologues, all focusing on the episode's subject. However, every season featured one or two episodes that deviated from the show's regular format in favor of a single storyline (e.g., "Vegas", "Hollywood", "Road Rage", and "The End of the World").

=== Opening title sequence and theme song ===
Each episode of Season 1 opens with Ullman asleep in bed, musing about the topic she will be taking on for that particular episode. This is her only appearance out of character in the show. This eventually became an issue, as many viewers were unaware that Ullman was playing every character. The theme song was an original song performed by Ullman, describing the show's characters as "company in between [her] ears".

A new opening was conceived for Season 2 in which she opens the show with an anecdote or monologue in relation to the episode's subject. The show's theme song was also changed to her 1983 cover version of the Kirsty MacColl song "They Don't Know", with Ullman and her characters lip-syncing and dancing to it.

In February 1998, Ullman revealed that some viewers were still unaware that she was playing all the characters: "We still get letters asking, 'Can I have a picture of Tracey and the rest of the cast?'"

=== Ending ===
The series came to a close after a four-season run in 1999. Ullman began conceiving a new show in which she'd play only one or two characters with minimal makeup. "This time I'll play one or two characters [instead of all the characters]. I just don't want to put all that rubber on my face. That began to get really tedious. I've got to make it easier on myself, and it'll be easier if I don't have to spend ten hours in makeup."

== Episodes ==
Season	Episodes	Originally released	
Season	Episodes	First released	Last released
1	10	January 24, 1996	March 27, 1996
2	15	January 18, 1997	April 30, 1997
3	10	January 4, 1998	March 8, 1998
4	12	January 13, 1999	March 17, 1999
Character Comedies	15	—N/a	
Specials	3	1996–1998	

== Character origins and development ==
All of my characters have a sadness or inadequacy about them.

— Tracey Ullman

All of the characters in Tracey Takes On... are original creations. Ullman shied away from doing straight-up impersonations of celebrities believing it was Saturday Night Live territory. She instead chose to do amalgamations of many real-life everyday people, and in some instances, famous ones.

Kay Clark was the only character to return from The Tracey Ullman Show, as Ullman was the character's sole creator and Fox owned the rights to all the other characters that appeared on that show. "I love Kay; I'm very fond of her," Ullman said. "This little British spinster—she's so courageous. To think she's sort of on national television in America is rather thrilling to me, especially when I used to witness her in the local bank in my village. She'd say, 'Hello, Miss Ullman. How's Hollywood?' And to think she's on American television and—she doesn't know!"

Ruby Romaine, whom Ullman has described as "pure Hollywood white trash", was based on many of the Hollywood union makeup artists sent to make her up over the years. Ruby's look and surname were based on Romaine Greene, a hairstylist who worked on many of Woody Allen's films. Meanwhile, her voice was inspired by Florence Aadland—mother of actress Beverly Aadland, who at 15 had an affair with the then-48-year-old actor Errol Flynn. Ullman previously played Florence in the one-woman Broadway show The Big Love, preparing for the role by listening to hours of audio recordings of Florence dictating her life story to writer Tedd Thomey for the book of the same name. Because of this, there are strong parallels between Ruby Romaine's fictional early days in Hollywood and the real-life experiences of Beverly Aadland.

The characters Fern and Harry Rosenthal and Linda Granger were created for Tracey Ullman Takes on New York. Fern and Harry were based on Betty and Fred Valk of Baldwin, New York—the parents of Ullman's friend, Katie Valk. Ullman met the couple after she flew to New York to act as a guest VJ on MTV. She toyed with the idea of giving Fern her own show but found that playing the character left her feeling like a "limp rag" and that her husband "avoided her like the plague." She described Fern as "loud, emotional, with 'I'm from the suburbs' written all over her. She sat behind me at matinees of Cats and Les Misérables, not too shy to shout out to the performers, 'Speak up, darling, we can't hear you!'" When asked who had inspired washed-up Hollywood actress Linda Granger, Ullman responded: Loni Anderson and actresses who ended up guest-starring in episodes of Murder, She Wrote—"the kind of women that Ruby Romaine made up."

The characters Trevor Ayliss, Virginia and Timothy Bugge, and Janie Pillsworth, along with her mother Jackie, were originally created for the 1993 special Tracey Ullman: A Class Act. Trevor was based on a real British Airways steward; Ullman noticed that the gay crewmen on her flights would "butch up" the minute they left the galley, a detail she used for her performance. "I love Trevor. I've always wanted to do one of those gay air stewards because they're always so lovely to me. As Linda [Granger] says... 'I have a wonderful homosexual fan base, and I love them!'" Ullman said in a 1996 interview. Since playing the character, every male steward Ullman encountered was convinced that she based it on him. "And I always say I did. I go, 'You're right, I based it on you,' because that way I get free caviar." Fashion magazine editor Janie Pillsworth was an amalgamation of British editors Tina Brown and Anna Wintour.

Feeling that it would have been passé to play a talent agent, Ullman opted instead to play an attorney, Sydney Kross, apropos in the wake of the O. J. Simpson trial and Court TV. Critics immediately took note of the character’s uncanny resemblance to real-life attorney Leslie Abramson, who defended Lyle and Erik Menendez. Ullman noted, "She has a fascinating look [...] I think she'll recognize herself physically but not her personality [...] I've got some things physically which [aren't her]. I've [had] some teeth [made] that look like sharks. I had the glasses, the suit, but then I put these teeth in, and it made me move my mouth in a certain way. And I filed my nails square. Women in L.A. have these square white nails, really square..." When it came to Sydney's personality, Ullman found inspiration in an agent she had in Los Angeles named Holly "who was insane". Always wanting to find some redeeming quality in all her characters, she found herself stuck at first when it came to Sydney. "[I]t seemed she had no redeeming features: she's horrid, cold, impersonal." But then she found a "humanizing trait": loneliness. "She's so aggressive, and so ugly! She's got adult acne, and her teeth are terrible! [...] She became sort of appealing to me. All of my characters have a sadness or inadequacy about them."

Her Royal Highness is a combination of Queen Elizabeth's voice, Princess Margaret's lifestyle, the Duchess of Kent's hats, and Princess Anne's teeth. Ullman sent a copy of the show's "Royalty" episode to Princess Diana, feeling that she could use a laugh; Diana, through her lady-in-waiting, expressed that she had enjoyed it.

The show's Asian donut shop owner, Mrs. Noh Nang Ning, is modeled after a real-life donut shop owner Ullman met while writing the show's first season in Los Angeles. The character was the show's only encounter with controversy. An Asian American watchdog group protested the show, calling the character stereotypical and racist, and asked HBO to remove her. HBO defended the character, stating, "Tracey Ullman is a brilliant satirist and comedienne, and all of her work is in the spirit of fun and good humor." Ullman said of the controversy, "My criteria for doing a character is: Do they exist? Do they talk like this? Would they indeed run a donut establishment? And I think Mrs. Noh Nang Ning meets all of that." However, she acknowledged, "Asian people don't necessarily see themselves in mainstream television—and certainly not in comic situations—and after Mickey Rooney [as Mr. Yunioshi] in Breakfast at Tiffany's, I can understand why they're a little gun-shy." The controversy likely inspired a monologue delivered by Ruby Romaine, in which she reveals that she was responsible for Mickey Rooney's look in Breakfast at Tiffany's. True to form, Ruby doesn't understand the controversy and declares that she should have won an Oscar. Mrs. Noh Nang Ning was retired after Season 3, as Ullman had been complaining for years that the character's makeup felt like "being buried alive". People of color, including Asian Americans, made up the show's largest fan base. "It's such a diverse audience that I get. They're all those characters that I portray that are supposed to be politically incorrect," Ullman stated in 1998. "I get these Asian teenagers who come up and I think, 'Aren't you supposed to be offended by my donut-shop lady?' and they go, 'Oh, no! There's no one like that on TV. That's like my grandmother. I'd rather you do it than no one at all.'"

Beverly Hills madam Madam Nadja is based on Elizabeth Adams (better known as "Madam Alex"), of whom Ullman said: "I love that she kept money underneath her bed. She never gets up all day. If she ever has to get out of bed, it's like, 'Dammit, I've got to get out of bed. I've got to get dressed.' That's when something major happens—that she has to get dressed. She's very angry because she had to get out of bed today because of some stupid hooker in Venice."

The character Chic is based on a real New York City cab driver who once drove writer Allen Zipper to LaGuardia Airport. The line "You want to fuck me or you want to fuck my Mercedes?" was an actual comment from the driver regarding his belief that women in Los Angeles only cared about money. Ullman had a similar experience and spent the entire ride wondering how she could "turn herself into" the driver. The character was also partially based on a man she knew as a teenager in London who worked in a restaurant and used the pick-up line: "Hey, darling, you like sex?"

== Notable guest stars ==
Guest stars marked with an asterisk (*) indicate those who made recurring guest appearances.

- Amy Alcott (Note: Playing themselves.)
- Joan van Ark
- Corbin Bernsen
- Julie Brown
- Ron Canada *
- Seymour Cassel *
- Billy Connolly
- Bob Costas
- Kristin Dattilo *
- Mark DeCarlo *
- Melinda Dillon
- Richard Dimitri *
- Alastair Duncan *
- Chris Elliott
- Erik Estrada
- Jon Favreau *
- Matt Frewer
- Mo Gaffney *
- Judy Geeson *
- Gloria Gifford *
- Steven Gilborn
- Adele Givens *
- Joanna Gleason *
- Whoopi Goldberg
- Bill Harris
- Howard Hessman
- Huell Howser
- Finola Hughes
- Alex Karras
- Julie Kavner *
- Hugh Laurie *
- Hiep Thi Le
- Jennifer Jason Leigh
- Tobey Maguire
- John Mahoney
- Cheech Marin *
- Penny Marshall
- Roddy McDowall
- Bruce McGill *
- Tim McInnerny *
- Michael McKean *
- Sam McMurray
- Helen Mirren
- Joshua Malina *
- Alfred Molina
- Olivia Newton-John
- Natalija Nogulich *
- Gary Oldman
- Todd Oldham
- Carre Otis
- Maulik Pancholy *
- Ron Perlman
- Victoria Principal
- Giovanni Ribisi
- Marissa Ribisi *
- Melissa Rivers
- Glenn Shadix
- George Segal *
- Harry Shearer
- John Stamos
- Jeffrey Tambor
- The Roches
- Scott Thompson
- Liz Torres *
- M. Emmet Walsh
- Bradley Whitford
- Danny Woodburn *

== Marketing ==
Famed caricaturist Al Hirschfeld's artistic rendering of Ullman and her characters was used to promote the show's third season.

In 1999, Ullman was featured in a Got Milk? ad campaign, along with three of her Tracey Takes On... characters: Kay Clark, Linda Granger, and Hope Finch.

Ullman reprised the character Fern Rosenthal for a Marshall Field's department store commercial in 2003.

== Reception ==
=== Awards and nominations ===
The series was nominated for 30 Primetime Emmy Awards and won seven, including the 1997 award for Outstanding Variety, Music, or Comedy Series. The show also won a CableACE Award in 1996 for Best Comedy Variety Series, three American Comedy Awards, and two GLAAD Media Awards (in 1998 and 1999).

American Comedy Awards

- 1998–Funniest Female Performer in a TV Series (Leading Role) Network, Cable or Syndication
- 1999–Funniest Female Performer in a TV Series (Leading Role) Network, Cable or Syndication
- 2000–Funniest Female Performer in a TV Series (Leading Role) Network, Cable or Syndication

CableACE Awards

- 1996–Actress in a Comedy Series
- 1996–Variety Special or Series

Directors Guild of America

- 1997–Outstanding Directorial Achievement in Musical/Variety

Primetime Emmy Awards

- 1996–Outstanding Costume Design for a Variety or Music Program
- 1997–Outstanding Variety, Music or Comedy Series
- 1997–Outstanding Makeup for a Series
- 1997–Outstanding Costume Design for a Variety or Music Program
- 1998–Outstanding Hairstyling for a Series
- 1998–Outstanding Costume Design for a Variety or Music Program
- 1999–Outstanding Hairstyling for a Series

GLAAD Media Awards

- 1996–Outstanding TV Individual Episode ("Romance")
- 1999–Outstanding TV - Individual Episode ("Religion")

Online Film & Television Association

- 1998–Best Ensemble in a Variety, Musical, or Comedy Series
- 1998–Best Host or Performer in a Variety, Musical, or Comedy Series
- 1998–Best Variety, Musical, or Comedy Series
- 1998–Best Actress in a Cable Series
- 1999–Best Costume Design in a Series
- 1999–Best Host or Performer in a Variety, Musical, or Comedy Series
- 1999–Best Variety, Musical, or Comedy Series

Satellite Awards

- 1998–Best Performance by an Actress in a Television Series - Comedy or Musical

Screen Actors Guild Awards

- 1999–Outstanding Performance by a Female Actor in a Comedy Series, Tracey Takes On...

== Home media ==
=== VHS ===
Title	Release date	Running time	Extras
Tracey Takes On... Sex, Romance, Fantasy	January 27, 1998	80:00	Outtakes
Tracey Takes On... Movies, Vanity, Fame	January 27, 1998	80:00	Outtakes
Tracey Takes On... Fern & Kay	January 26, 1999	50:00	—N/a

=== DVD ===
Tracey Takes On... North American VHS and DVD releases from 1998 to 2009

On December 26, 2005, HBO Home Video released the first two seasons of Tracey Takes On... on DVD. The second season's "They Don't Know" lip-syncing title sequence has been removed and replaced with a black screen featuring the episode title, accompanied by an instrumental version of the first season's theme song. The closing credits feature the first season's theme song as well. Extras on the sets include the original HBO special Tracey Ullman Takes on New York (Season 1), commentary on one episode per season by Ullman, previously unreleased Character Comedies, character bios (Season 1), and a photo gallery (Season 2).

Seasons 3 and 4 were released by Eagle Rock Entertainment as a single DVD set on July 14, 2009, in the United States. While the set claims to be "complete", the episodes are heavily edited, with some whittled down to only three to five minutes in length; the episode "Religion" is missing entirely. The set includes three Character Comedies: Virginia, Ruby, and Rayleen. The DVDs are region-free.

Title	Release date	Special features	Running time
Tracey Takes On... The Complete First Season	December 26, 2005	Commentary by Tracey on "Romance"; Tracey Ullman Takes on New York; Character Comedies: Fern: The Early Years, Fern & Harry, Linda, Janie; "Meet the Characters" slide show	300 minutes
Tracey Takes On... The Complete Second Season	June 27, 2006	Commentary by Tracey on "Las Vegas"; Character Comedies: Kay, Chris, Hope; "The Many Faces of Tracey" slide show	450 minutes
Tracey Takes On... Complete Seasons 3 & 4	July 14, 2009	Character Comedies: Virginia, Ruby, Rayleen	366 minutes

=== Digital distribution ===
Seasons one through four were released for purchase through iTunes and the Amazon Video on Demand service in the United States in 2009; however, they are currently unavailable in either store. The episodes were heavily edited, and some were combined to compensate for lost running time. In 2012, the entire series, comprising 65 episodes, became available to stream through Hulu, including all 15 previously unaired Character Comedies episodes.

== Bibliography ==
- Ullman, Tracey (1998). Tracey Takes On. Hyperion. ISBN 978-0-786-86340-2.
