= Broken Home =

Broken Home may refer to:

== Music ==
- "Broken Home" (Papa Roach song), a 2000 song by the band Papa Roach
- "Broken Home", a 1989 song by White Lion from Big Game
- "Broken Home", a 2008 song by Greydon Square from The C.P.T. Theorem
- "Broken Home", a 2015 song by 5 Seconds of Summer from Sounds Good Feels Good

== Television ==
- "Broken Home" (Body of Proof), a 2011 episode of Body of Proof
- "Broken Home" (CSI: Miami), an episode of CSI: Miami
- "Broken Home", an episode of True Colors
