= My Very Best Friend =

- Genre: Drama; Thriller
- Teleplay by: Lindsay Harrison; John Robert Bensink
- Story by: Michael I. Miller; Patti Obrow White; Robert Glass
- Directed by: Joyce Chopra
- Starring: Jaclyn Smith; Jill Eikenberry
- Music by: Patrick Williams
- Countries of origin: United States; Canada
- Original language: English

Production
- Executive producer: Fred Silverman
- Producers: Sandra Saxon Brice; Richard Davis; Laurette Hayden
- Production location: Vancouver
- Cinematography: James Glennon
- Running time: 88 min.
- Production companies: Dizenfield-Miller-White Productions; Fred Silverman Company; Once and Future Films; Viacom Productions

Original release
- Network: CBS
- Release: March 27, 1996

My Very Best Friend is a 1996 American made-for-TV thriller film directed by Joyce Chopra, and starring Jaclyn Smith and Jill Eikenberry.

== Plot ==
Former model Dana Griffin (Smith) invites her best friend Barbara Wilkins (Eikenberry) and her family over to San Francisco to attend her wedding to multimillionaire business tycoon Ted Marshall (Mason). Ted thinks that Dana is pregnant, but Barbara quickly finds out that Dana is lying. She initially tries to persuade Dana to tell the truth, but Dana convinces her to keep quiet, as she is pursuing to ultimately give Ted what he wishes for. Shortly after the wedding, Ted tries to surprise Dana at her so-called appointment with her doctor, only to find out about the scheme. Devastated, he tells her on their yacht that he will have the marriage annulled. In an act of desperation and outrage, Dana then pushes Ted off the yacht and watches as he drowns. She then quickly calls the police, lying about the cause of his drowning.

Shortly after Ted's death, she receives a visit from his best friend, lawyer Jay (Sanford). Jay was contacted by Ted about the annulment and openly suspects Dana of having killed her husband. Because of Jay's suspicion, Dana waives all rights to his estate and moves in with Barbara and her family in New Hampshire. It does not take long before she starts causing friction between Barbara and her husband Alex (Irwin). At dinner, Dana reminds Barbara that Alex was not there for her when she gave birth to their now 13-year-old daughter Kate (Warnat), and later she plants one of her earrings in Alex's closet that Barbara ultimately finds. Barbara's friend Molly Butler (Place) does not like Dana, because she knows that Dana slept with Alex when she was 19 years old and when he was already engaged to Barbara.

In bed, Alex admits to Barbara that even though he has the supposedly perfect life, he still feels lonely and empty inside. Dana overhears the conversation through a voice recorder that she has secretly installed in their bedroom and uses the information to grow closer to Alex by making up a story of being lonely as well. They kiss briefly, unaware that the Wilkins' housemaid Rose (Elliott) saw them. Barbara, meanwhile, decides to work on her marriage and family and is worried that both Alex and Kate instead prefer to spend their time with Dana. She asks Dana to spend less time with Alex, but he is outraged when he finds out and leaves the home. Feeling mistreated, Barbara acts out by cutting his parachute with a knife. She then orders Rose to replace it, but she forgets.

Later that evening, Dana lures Barbara away by saying that Kate is in the hospital, making sure that she is not present when throwing a surprise party for Alex. They get drunk and spend the night together, and the next morning, Dana is already making plans to get married, when Alex tells her that he has no interest in being with her and has had made a mistake. Barbara catches the couple in bed and confronts Dana with all her schemes. Dana then reveals that the abortion she had twenty years earlier was of Alex's child. Barbara leaves heartbroken, and Alex is about to follow her when Dana shoots his gun on him. Alex ultimately overpowers Dana and then leaves to go parachute jumping. Because of being cut up, the parachute does not open during the fall, and Alex dies. Initially, Barbara is questioned as the perpetrator for cutting up the parachute, but through her own voice recorder device, all of Dana's schemes, including murdering Ted, are put to light as the police are present.

== Cast ==
- Jaclyn Smith as Dana Griffin
- Jill Eikenberry as Barbara Wilkins
- Tom Irwin as Alex Wilkins
- Tom Mason as Ted
- Kimberley Warnat as Kate Wilkins
- Beverley Elliott as Rose
- Garwin Sanford as Jay
- Mary Kay Place as Molly Butler
- Robert Lewis as Trooper Russo
- Steve Makaj as Trooper Harris
- Ryan Taylor as Bobby

== Production ==
The script was based on a screenplay, suggesting that the film was once developed as a feature film. Production took place in Vancouver between January 16 and February 15, 1996.

== Reception ==
Variety was positive about the film, and especially praised director Joyce Chopra: "Bigscreen helmer Joyce Chopra [..] directs with a sure hand, eliciting multilayered perfs from her leads and delivering a wholly enjoyable tale. [..] Chopra directs with subtlety, and never lets Smith go over the top even when her character does. Eikenberry brings depth to a role that borders on revolting goodness, a la Melanie Wilkes in Gone With the Wind."

The reviewer of the Chicago Tribune was less enthusiastic, but attributed that "for what it is, this is actually pretty well done, with strong performances from Eikenberry and Tom Irwin as her husband."

The film was released on VHS in June 1998.
