= Without Consent =

1994 American Television Movie

- VHS cover
- Genre: Drama
- Written by: Tim Kring
- Directed by: Robert Iscove
- Starring: Jennie Garth; Jill Eikenberry; Tom Irwin
- Music by: Craig Safan
- Country of origin: United States
- Original language: English

Production
- Executive producers: Stanley M. Brooks; Jennie Garth
- Producers: Robert Iscove; Michael O. Gallant
- Production location: Austin, Texas
- Cinematography: John Beymer
- Editor: Martin Nicholson
- Running time: 88 minutes
- Production companies: Blue Puddle Productions; Once Upon a Time Films

Original release
- Network: ABC
- Release: October 16, 1994

Without Consent, also known as Trapped and Deceived, is a 1994 television film directed by Robert Iscove and starring Jennie Garth, Jill Eikenberry, and Tom Irwin. The film, which was based on a true story, was received generally negatively, although the lead actors were praised for their roles.

== Plot ==
Laura Mills is a rebellious teenager who spends her days getting drunk, listening to rock music and making out with several boyfriends. Her behavior gets worse when her brother David is kicked out of the house for theft and alcohol abuse. When it turns out she was involved in a drunk driving incident, her parents decide they have had enough. They cannot control their daughter and send her to a residential treatment center. It soon turns out that the staff drugged and abused patients in this center.

Laura feels that she does not belong in the facility, claiming that she has no mental problems. Attempts to escape from the center prove unsuccessful and she is shot with a tranquilizer, and, one night, was placed in a straitjacket. One day, she succeeds in escaping and immediately turns to her parents. They, however, do not believe a word she is saying about the facility and send her back. The staff, angered by her escape, make clear that they will not treat her properly any longer. It becomes clear to Laura that she has no hope of ever leading a normal life again and accepts her fate.

When Laura's health gets worse, her parents start to believe that she was telling the truth. They decide that she should return home again, but the doctors are not willing to let her go. Determined to end the practice of the doctors, with the help from lawyer Nora Fields, Laura's parents take the issue to court, where the facility is put on trial.

== Cast ==
- Jennie Garth as Laura Mills
- Jill Eikenberry as Michelle Mills
- Tom Irwin as Robert Mills
- Johnny Galecki as Marty
- Eric Close as David Mills
- Helen Shaver as Nora Fields
- Paul Sorvino as Dr. Winslow
- Cynthia Dorn as Miss Collins
