= Jill Eikenberry =

American actress (born 1947)

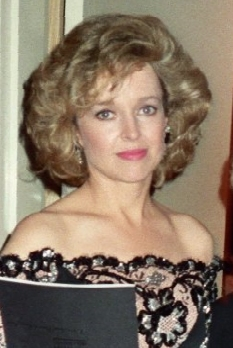
- Eikenberry in 1989
- Born: Jill Susan Eikenberry; January 21, 1947 (age 79); New Haven, Connecticut, U.S
- Education: Columbia University; Yale University (MFA)
- Occupation: Actress
- Years active: 1970–present
- Spouse: Michael Tucker (m. 1973)
- Children: 1

Jill Susan Eikenberry (born January 21, 1947) is an American film, stage, and television actress. She is known for her role as lawyer Ann Kelsey on the NBC drama L.A. Law (1986–94), for which she is a five-time Emmy Award and four-time Golden Globe Award nominee, winning the Golden Globe for Best Actress in a Drama Series in 1989. She received an Obie Award in 1986 for the Off-Broadway plays Lemon Sky and Life Under Water, and was nominated for a 2011 Drama Desk Award for the Off-Broadway musical The Kid. Her film appearances include Hide in Plain Sight (1980), Arthur (1981) and The Manhattan Project (1986).

== Life and career ==
Eikenberry was born in New Haven, Connecticut, and was raised in Madison, Wisconsin, and St. Joseph and Kansas City, Missouri. She began studies in anthropology at Barnard College of Columbia University, but in her second year she auditioned for and was accepted into the Yale School of Drama.

She met Michael Tucker at the Arena Stage in Washington, D.C., where they appeared together in The Night Thoreau Spent in Jail (1970) and Moonchildren (1971), the latter of which transferred to Broadway in 1972. She married Tucker in 1973 and they settled in New York City. She has a son, Max, and a stepdaughter, actress Allison Tucker (by Michael's first marriage).

Her first role in film was a minor role in the television film, They've Killed President Lincoln (1971). Among her early feature films was Between the Lines (1977), directed by Joan Micklin Silver. She and Michael Tucker had small roles in Lina Wertmüller's 1978 success A Night Full of Rain, and she also appeared in An Unmarried Woman starring Jill Clayburgh the same year.

Throughout the 1970s, Eikenberry's main focus was on theater. She made her Broadway debut in 1974 in All Over Town, and later appeared Off-Broadway in Uncommon Women and Others, which was later filmed for American public television. She also starred in the musical Onward Victoria (1980), which closed on opening night.

The 1980s saw a number of television films to her credit, and a major film success, Dudley Moore's star vehicle Arthur (1981). In 1986, she and Michael Tucker scored a major success by each securing major parts in the successful television series L.A. Law. They were given the roles by producer Steven Bochco, who had been impressed by the pair when he used them for two episodes on his earlier hit Hill Street Blues. For her performance, Eikenberry received five Primetime Emmy Awards nominations, and four Golden Globe Award for Best Actress – Television Series Drama, winning in 1989. Jill and Michael moved to Hollywood at this time, and it was in this period that Jill discovered she had breast cancer, which was successfully treated over the next two years.

The event was significant in her life. In 1989, she co-produced a documentary for NBC television called Destined to Live, which featured interviews with cancer survivors like herself, including Nancy Reagan. She remains an activist for breast cancer research and early detection.

Eikenberry continued to appear in television films over the next decade, while continuing her role on L.A. Law. With the financial success accruing from their L.A. Law work, Jill and Michael produced a number of television films as vehicles in which they appeared together. They include Assault and Matrimony (1987), The Secret Life of Archie's Wife (1990), A Town Torn Apart (1992) and Gone in a Heartbeat (1996).

Since L.A. Law's run ended in 1994, her film and television appearances have been sporadic. One of her more recent roles was in the comedy Manna from Heaven (2003), in which she appeared with Cloris Leachman and Shirley Jones.

She has sung on stage and in films, and in recent years, she and her husband have written a number of songs. They currently reside in New York and Umbria.

After meeting artist Emile Norman, Eikenberry and Tucker purchased land from him to become his neighbors in Big Sur, California. Becoming friends with him, they produced a 2008 PBS documentary, Emile Norman: By His Own Design.

Eikenberry guest starred on Numb3rs in 2008, Law & Order in 2009 and Body of Proof (Episode: "Broken Home") in 2011. She played mothers on lead characters in films Suburban Girl (2007), Something Borrowed (2011) and Young Adult (2011). In March, 2015 Eikenberry co-starred with Tucker in The M Spot, a play written by Tucker and presented at the New Jersey Repertory Company.

In 2022, Eikenberry returned to her Ann Kelsey role in the ABC revival pilot of L.A. Law.

== Filmography ==
=== Film ===
Year	Title	Role	Notes
1977	Between the Lines	Lynn	
1978	A Night Full of Rain		
1978	An Unmarried Woman	Claire	
1978	Rush It	Merrill	
1979	Butch and Sundance: The Early Days	Mary Parker	
1979	Rich Kids	Juilliard Student	
1980	Hide in Plain Sight	Alisa Hacklin	
1981	Arthur	Susan Johnson	
1986	The Manhattan Project	Elizabeth Stephens	
1993	Chantilly Lace	Val	
1994	On Hope	Woman at Church	Short film
2002	Manna from Heaven	Dottie	
2007	The Happiest Day of His Life	Penny Somerset	
2007	Suburban Girl	Marlene Eisenberg	
2011	Something Borrowed	Bridget Thaler	
2011	Young Adult	Hedda Gary	
2015	Keep in Touch	Barbara	
2017	Humor Me	Jill Eikenberry	
2018	In Reality	Aunt Doreen	
2022	Chantilly Bridge		

=== Television ===
Year	Title	Role	Notes
1971	They've Killed President Lincoln!	Anne Surratt	TV film
1977	The Deadliest Season	Carole Eskanazi	TV film
1977	The Best of Families	Sarah Lathrop	TV miniseries
1979	Great Performances	Kate Quin	Episode: "Uncommon Women... and Others"
1979	Orphan Train	Emma Symms	TV film
1980	Swan Song	Anna	TV film
1982	Nurse		Episode: "On the Line"
1983	Sessions	Maggie	TV film
1984	Hill Street Blues	Sarah Fimpel	2 episodes
1985	Kane & Abel	Susan Lester	TV miniseries
1986–1994	L.A. Law	Ann Kelsey	Main role (169 episodes)
1987	Assault and Matrimony	Sylvia	TV film
1987	Family Sins	Kate Williams	TV film
1988	Mickey's 60th Birthday	Mia Loud	TV film
1988	ABC Afterschool Special	Clare Foster	Episode: "A Family Again"
1988	A Stoning in Fulham County	Susan	TV film
1989	My Boyfriend's Back	Deborah McGuire	TV film
1989	Cast the First Stone	Diane Martin	TV film
1990	The Secret Life of Archie's Wife	Bunny	TV film
1991	An Inconvenient Woman	Pauline Mendelson	TV miniseries
1991	Living a Lie	Joanne	TV film
1992	A Town Torn Apart	Ellen Kreiger	TV film
1993	Chantilly Lace	Val	TV film
1993	Tracey Ullman Takes on New York	Jessica Stern	TV film
1994	Aaahh!!! Real Monsters	Merf / Michelle	Voice, episode: "Where Have All the Monsters Gone?"
1994	Parallel Lives	Lula Sparks	TV film
1994	Without Consent	Michelle Mills	TV film
1994	Rugged Gold	Martha Martin	TV film
1995	The Other Woman	Tessa Bryan	TV film
1995	Dare to Love	Alicia Wells	TV film
1996	My Very Best Friend	Barbara Wilkins	TV film
1996	Gone in a Heartbeat	Jan Hale	TV film
1999	Chicken Soup for the Soul		Episode: "No Less a Starfish"
1999	Batman Beyond	Mrs. Wilson	Voice, episode: "Hidden Agenda"
2000	Strong Medicine	Councilwoman Evelyn Barrett	Episode: "Do No Harm"
2000	Judging Amy	Sheila Townsend	Episode: "Waterworld"
2001	Stop at Nothing		TV film
2002	Roughing It	Livy Clemens	TV film
2002	L.A. Law: The Movie	Ann Kelsey	TV film
2008	Numb3rs	Susan Doran	Episode: "Atomic No. 33"
2009	Law & Order	Irene Matson	Episode: "Anchors Away"
2011	Body of Proof	Lillian Parkson	Episode: "Broken Home"
2021	The Good Fight	Sharon Booth	Episode: "And the Firm Had Two Partners..."
2022	LA Law	Judge Ann Kelsey	Pilot
2024	Elsbeth	Phyllis Pearson	Episode: "I See... Murder"

== Awards and nominations ==
Awards
Year	Award	Category	Production	Result
1986	Obie Award	Performance	Lemon Sky and Life Under Water	Nominated
1987	Primetime Emmy	Outstanding Lead Actress in a Drama Series	L.A. Law	Nominated
1988	Primetime Emmy	Outstanding Lead Actress in a Drama Series	L.A. Law	Nominated
1988	Golden Globe	Best Performance by an Actress in a TV Series – Drama	L.A. Law	Nominated
1989	Primetime Emmy	Outstanding Lead Actress in a Drama Series	L.A. Law	Nominated
1989	Golden Globe	Best Performance by an Actress in a TV Series – Drama	L.A. Law	Won
1990	Primetime Emmy	Outstanding Lead Actress in a Drama Series	L.A. Law	Nominated
1990	Golden Globe	Best Performance by an Actress in a TV Series – Drama	L.A. Law	Nominated
1991	Golden Globe	Best Performance by an Actress in a TV Series – Drama	L.A. Law	Nominated
1994	Primetime Emmy	Outstanding Supporting Actress in a Drama Series	L.A. Law	Nominated
2011	Drama Desk Award	Outstanding Featured Actress in a Musical	The Kid	Nominated
