= Tom Irwin (actor) =

American actor (born 1956)

- Born: June 1, 1956 (age 70); Peoria, Illinois, U.S.
- Education: Illinois State University
- Occupation: Actor
- Years active: 1979–present

Tom Irwin (born June 1, 1956) is an American film, television, and stage actor. Irwin is best known for his roles as Adrian Powell in the Lifetime comedy-drama series Devious Maids and Graham Chase in the 1994 drama My So-Called Life.

== Early life and education ==
Born in Peoria, Illinois, Irwin graduated from Illinois State University in Normal, Illinois. He joined the Steppenwolf Theatre Company in 1979, where he performed alongside Laurie Metcalf, John Malkovich, Joan Allen, and Gary Sinise.

== Career ==
Irwin has been on the faculty of The Theatre School at DePaul University and Columbia College Chicago. He is a class instructor at Steppenwolf Theatre Company West School of Drama in Los Angeles. He has appeared in over 50 Steppenwolf productions, and won a Joseph Jefferson Award for his performance as Tom in Steppenwolf's production of The Glass Menagerie.

His first starring television role was in 1991, in the short-lived ABC series My Life and Times. He starred as the soft-spoken father Graham Chase in the 1994 ABC series My So-Called Life. He has had numerous television appearances, including Angel, ER, and Lost. He had a regular role on the series Saving Grace for three seasons, beginning in 2007. He made his Broadway debut in 1990 in The Grapes of Wrath. Irwin, who has also appeared in various movie roles, lives in Los Angeles, California. In 2002 he played Gerry in London's West End production of Up for Grabs with Madonna. In 1999, he starred in No Higher Love, with Katey Sagal and Annabeth Gish.

From 2013 to 2016, Irwin starred opposite Rebecca Wisocky in the four seasons that were produced of the Lifetime television comedy-drama series Devious Maids.

== Filmography ==
- Vital Signs (1986) (TV) as Dr. #2
- Crime Story as Mayor Billy Haynes (1 episode, 1986)
- Jack and Mike as Hogan (1 episode, 1987)
- Midnight Run (1988) as FBI Agent Perry
- Light of Day (1987) as Reverend Ansley
- China Beach as Bellows (1 episode, 1989)
- In the Best Interest of the Child (1990) (TV) as Frank
- To My Daughter (1990) (TV) as Mark Sheridan
- Men Don't Leave (1990) as Gary
- My Life and Times as Ben Miller (6 episodes, 1991)
- Deceived (1991) as Harvey
- Ladykiller (1992) (TV) as Vinnie
- Country Estates (1993) (TV) as Sam Reed
- Mr. Jones (1993) as Dr. Patrick Shaye
- Nurses on the Line: The Crash of Flight 7 (1993) (TV) as Eddie
- Without Consent (1994) (TV) as Robert Mills
- My So-Called Life as Graham Chase (19 episodes, 1994-1995)
- Innocent Victims (1996) (TV) as Jerry Beaver
- A Step Toward Tomorrow (1996) as Dr. Decker
- My Very Best Friend (1996) (TV) as Alex
- Holiday Affair (1996) (TV) as Paul Davis
- When Husbands Cheat (1998) (TV) as Craig McCall
- In Quiet Night (1998) as Dr. Leonard Wolcott
- The Girl Next Door (1998) (TV) as Craig Mitchell
- God's New Plan (1999) (TV) as Brian Young
- The Haunting (1999) as Lou
- The Sky's on Fire (1999) (TV) as Dr. Aaron Schiffren
- The Outer Limits as Dr. Ian Michaels (1 episode, 1999)
- The Sandy Bottom Orchestra (2000) (TV) as Norman Green
- Touched by an Angel as Will Harris (1 episode, 2001)
- The Division as FBI Agent Aubrey Harrick (1 episode, 2001)
- Frasier as Frank (1 episode, 2001)
- Snow White: The Fairest of Them All (2001) (TV) as John
- CSI: Crime Scene Investigation as Roy Logan (1 episode, 2002)
- Angel as Elliot (1 episode, 2002)
- Without a Trace as Barry Mashburn (2 episodes, 2003)
- Miracles as Larry Kettridge (1 episode, 2003)
- 21 Grams (2003) as Dr. Jones
- Exposed (2003) as Parsons, Erik
- ER as Gabriel Milner (1 episode, 2005)
- Numb3rs as Dr. Stephen Atwood (1 episode, 2005)
- Judging Amy as Oliver Cecil (1 episode, 2005)
- The Closer as Congressman Hilton (1 episode, 2005)
- Reunion as Mr. Noll (1 episode, 2005)
- Ghost Whisperer as Steve Harper (1 episode, 2005)
- 7th Heaven as Rob (1 episode, 2005)
- Related as Joe Sorelli (13 episodes, 2005-2006)
- Fool Me Once (2006) as Donald
- Who You Know (2007) as Karl
- Private Practice as Father Mark (1 episode, 2007)
- Danny Fricke (2008) (TV) as Gary Stockwell
- Marley & Me (2008) as Dr. Sherman
- Eli Stone as Judge Gaitin (1 episode, 2008)
- 24 as John Brunner (1 episode, 2009)
- Timer (2009) as Paul Depaul
- Lost as Dan Norton (2 episodes, 2009)
- Saving Grace as Father John Hanadarko (19 episodes, 2007-2010)
- Privileged (2010) as Mr. Carrington
- Grey's Anatomy as Marty Hancock (3 episodes, 2010-2011)
- Castle as Simon Campbell (1 episode, 2011)
- The Chicago Code as Ted Langley (1 episode, 2011)
- Law & Order: Special Victims Unit as Jerry Bullard (1 episode, season 12 episode 19 "Bombshell") and as Roger Briggs (1 episode, season 24 episode "Bend the Law")
- The Bling Ring (2011) (TV) as Detective Archie Fishman
- Least Among Saints (2012) as Dr. Joseph Hunter
- House of Lies as Matt (1 episode, 2012)
- Devious Maids as Adrian Powell (2013-2016)
- Criminal Minds as Sgt. Joe Mahaffey (1 episode, 2013)
- Chasing Life as Thomas Carver (2014-2015)
- How to Get Away with Murder (season 4) as Spivey (1 episode, season 4, 2018)
- The Morning Show as Fred Micklen (19 episodes, 2019-2023)
