= Tracey Ullman Takes on New York =

American comedy television special

- Written by: Dick Clement; Marc Flanagan; Ian La Frenais; Stephen Nathan; Tony Sheehan
- Directed by: Don Scardino
- Starring: Tracey Ullman; Dan Castellaneta; Blythe Danner; Jill Eikenberry; Michael Tucker; Dan Futterman; Jim Fyfe; Todd Oldham; Parker Posey; Jerry Stiller; Michael York
- Composers: Simon Brint; Simon Wallace
- Country of origin: United States

Production
- Executive producer: Allan McKeown
- Producer: David Wimbury
- Cinematography: Constantine Makris
- Editor: Michael Hunt
- Running time: 50 minutes
- Production companies: WitzEnd Productions; Carlton Select; SelecTV

Original release
- Network: HBO
- Release: October 9, 1993

Related
- Tracey Ullman: A Class Act; Tracey Takes On...

Tracey Ullman Takes on New York is an HBO television special starring Tracey Ullman. The show was Ullman's first project for the network, and it led to the creation of the sketch comedy series Tracey Takes On...

== Premise ==
=== The Johnsons ===
Visiting Wisconsin couple Penny and Gordon Johnson get separated in the Big Apple. After actress Linda Granger is hit by a bus, Penny takes over her role in Finian's Rainbow, playing on Broadway.

=== Family Reunion ===
Fashion magazine editor Janie Pillsworth is reunited with the parents she disowned, thanks to a colleague who is vying for her job.

=== The Rosenthal Affair ===
Harry and Fern Rosenthal welcome their daughter's future in-laws to the city. Fern becomes jealous and suspicious of her future son-in-law's mother.

== Cast ==
- Tracey Ullman as Penny Johnson, Linda Granger, Janie Pillsworth, Jackie Pillsworth, Fern Rosenthal
- Paul Butler as Jay Levine
- Dan Castellaneta as Gordon Johnson, Bryan Lynn
- Nell Campbell
- Maddie Corman as Sheila Rosenthal
- Blythe Danner as Eleanor Levine
- Jill Eikenberry as Jessica Stern
- Joe Franklin as Himself
- K. Todd Freeman as Byron
- Dan Futterman as Peter Levine
- Jim Fyfe as Drug Dealer
- Robert Joy as Disgruntled Ex-Employee
- Josh Mostel
- Todd Oldham as Himself
- Parker Posey as Libby
- Jerry Stiller as Theatrical Producer
- Michael Tucker as Harry Rosenthal
- Michael York as Central Park Acquaintance

== Background ==
After ending her eponymous Fox show in 1990, Ullman chose to take a break from television and concentrate on motherhood, having given birth to her second child in 1991. That same year, her husband, independent British television producer Allan McKeown, placed a bid for a television franchise in the South of England. Along with his bid, he included a potential television programming lineup, which included a Tracey Ullman special. When his bid was successful, Ullman created the ITV comedy special Tracey Ullman: A Class Act, which lampooned the British class system. Following its success, the American cable network HBO became interested in her doing a special for them. The one caveat was that the show focus on an "American" subject. Ullman chose New York. The special, titled Tracey Ullman Takes on New York, was filmed on location in Manhattan over a period of three weeks. Three new characters were created for her to portray, along with Class Act characters Janie Pillsworth and Janie's mother, Jackie. Weeks after the special's broadcast, HBO aired Tracey Ullman: A Class Act on November 23, 1993, the special that initially sparked their interest. After the success of both specials, HBO became interested in Ullman doing a "takes on" series. Ullman and her husband agreed, and the pair set up production in Los Angeles in 1995 to begin work on Tracey Takes On...

=== Format ===
The special is split into three acts with one segment (Linda Granger being hit by a bus) shown from the points of view of two different characters: Penny Johnson and Fern Rosenthal (who causes the accident).

== Reception ==
=== Critical response ===
The special received critical acclaim. Tony Scott of Variety wrote, "Ullman lends depth and insight to all her characterizations ... Ullman and the first-class cast surrounding her, the superior writing and direction give TV comedy a much-needed lift."

=== Awards and nominations ===
Year	Award	Category	Recipient(s)/Nominee(s)	Result	Ref(s)
1994	American Comedy Awards	Funniest Female Performer in a TV Special (Leading or Supporting) Network, Cable or Syndication	Tracey Ullman	Won	
1994	CableACE Awards	Performance in a Comedy Special	Tracey Ullman	Won	
1994	CableACE Awards	Writing an Entertainment Special	Dick Clement, Marc Flanagan, Ian La Frenais, Stephen Nathan, Tony Sheehan	Nominated	
1994	CableACE Awards	Directing a Comedy Special	Don Scardino	Nominated	
1994	Directors Guild of America	Outstanding Directorial Achievement in Musical/Variety	Don Scardino	Nominated	
1994	Primetime Emmy Awards	Outstanding Individual Achievement in Costume Design for a Variety or Music Program	Jane Ruhm	Won	
1994	Primetime Emmy Awards	Outstanding Individual Performance in a Variety or Music Program	Tracey Ullman	Won	
1994	Primetime Emmy Awards	Outstanding Individual Achievement in Directing in a Variety or Music Program	Don Scardino	Nominated	
1994	Primetime Emmy Awards	Outstanding Individual Achievement in Editing for a Miniseries or a Special - Multi-Camera Production	Michael Hunt	Nominated	
1994	Primetime Emmy Awards	Outstanding Individual Achievement in Makeup for a Miniseries or a Special	Sally Sutton (Ms. Ullman's makeup), Bari Dreiband-Burman (makeup effects design), Thomas R. Burman (makeup effects design)	Nominated	
1994	Primetime Emmy Awards	Outstanding Individual Achievement in Writing in a Variety or Music Program	Dick Clement, Marc Flanagan, Ian La Frenais, Stephen Nathan, Tony Sheehan	Nominated	
1994	Primetime Emmy Awards	Outstanding Variety, Music or Comedy Special	Allan McKeown (executive producer), Marc Flanagan (supervising producer), David Wimbury (producer), John H. Starke (line producer)	Nominated	
1995	Writers Guild of America	Variety - Musical, Award, Tribute, Special Event	Tony Sheehan, Dick Clement, Ian La Frenais, Stephen Nathan, Marc Flanagan	Won	

== Home media ==
The special acts as a bonus feature on the DVD set Tracey Takes On... Complete Season 1. It became available on Hulu in the United States in 2012.

== Bibliography ==
- Ullman, Tracey (1998). Tracey Takes On. Hyperion. ISBN 978-0-786-86340-2.
