= My Life and Times =

American drama television series

- Genre: Drama
- Created by: Ron Koslow
- Starring: Tom Irwin; Megan Mullally; Helen Hunt
- Composer: Lee Holdridge
- Country of origin: United States
- Original language: English
- No. of seasons: 1
- No. of episodes: 6

Production
- Running time: 30 minutes
- Production companies: Sea Change Productions; ABC Productions

Original release
- Network: ABC
- Release: April 24 – May 30, 1991

My Life and Times is an American drama television series that aired on ABC from April 24, 1991, to May 30, 1991. The series co-starred Helen Hunt.

== Premise ==
Set in 2035 and 2036, the series focused on 85-year-old former journalist Ben Miller. From his rocking chair at the Briars Retirement Retreat, Ben would recollect on an event from his life which would be dramatized in the episode. Among the events shown were the 1989 San Francisco earthquake, the 1987 stock market crash, "The Great Collapse of 1998" and the turn of the millennium.

== Cast ==
- Tom Irwin as Ben Miller
- Megan Mullally as Susan
- Helen Hunt as Rebecca Miller
- Matt McGrath as Robert Miller
- Harriet Medin as Jessie

== Episodes ==
| No. | Title | Directed by | Written by | Original release date |
|---|---|---|---|---|
| 1 | "April 9, 2035" | Michael Apted | Ron Koslow | April 24, 1991 |
| 2 | "Jessie" | Michael Apted | Ron Koslow | May 1, 1991 |
| 3 | "Our Wedding" | John Pasquin | Story by : Ron Koslow & Evan Katz; Teleplay by : Evan Katz | May 23, 1991 |
| 4 | "Millennium" | Martin Davidson | Hugh O'Neill | May 23, 1991 |
| 5 | "Fare on Park Avenue" | Michael Tuchner | Story by : Ron Koslow; Teleplay by : Hugh O'Neill & Jerry Rigg | May 30, 1991 |
| 6 | "The Collapse of '98" | Christopher Leitch | Story by : Bill Levinson & Jerry Rigg; Teleplay by : Jerry Rigg & Hugh O' Neill | May 30, 1991 |
