= Broken Home (Body of Proof) =

- Body of Proof episode
- Megan Hunt (Dana Delany) (above) with victim Nikki Parkson (Mary Fegreus) (below). This shows the neck of Nikki, noting the bruising to show strangulation, with the detail called "fascinating".
- Episode no.: Season 1 Episode 9
- Directed by: Andrew Dettman
- Written by: Nelson McCormick
- Production code: 108
- Original air date: May 17, 2011

Guest appearances
- Jill Eikenberry as Lillian Parkson; Jeffrey Nordling as Todd Fleming; Mary Mouser as Lacey Fleming; Jo Armeniox as Sara Parkson; Eric Sheffer Stevens as Bill Parkson; Charlie Semine as Shane Rinaldi; Mary Fegreus as Nikki Parkson; John Hillner as Detective Dryer (Note: Although credited as "Detective Dryer" Radio Times uses the name "Dryer" as his name. Compare: Official credits to Radio Times's credits.); John Hickok as Dr. Reynolds; Jason Alan Carvell as Principal Brian Weaver

Episode chronology
← Previous "Buried Secrets"	Next → "Love Thy Neighbor"
- Body of Proof (season 1)

"Broken Home" is the ninth and final episode of the first season of the American medical drama Body of Proof. It was originally broadcast in the United States on ABC on 17 May 2011. The episode was directed by Nelson McCormick and written by Andrew Dettman.

In this episode, Megan Hunt (Dana Delany) stops the funeral of Nikki Parkson (Mary Fegreus) after seeing irregularities in her death. Nikki's mother Lillian (Jill Eikenberry), and siblings Sara (Jo Armeniox) and Bill (Eric Sheffer Stevens), all say that Nikki was suicidal, with evidence at the scene suggesting this, but when Megan and Peter Dunlop (Nicholas Bishop) do an autopsy, the evidence suggests otherwise. Meanwhile, Megan finds out from daughter Lacey (Mary Mouser) that her ex-husband Todd (Jeffrey Nordling) is in a relationship with her boss Kate Murphy (Jeri Ryan).

The episode received mixed to positive reviews, and was watched by 10.33 million viewers, according to Nielsen ratings, on the Sunday night it aired in the United States. Christine Orlando of TV Fanatic was unsure whether the episode was good enough to be the season finale, however she did praise this "solid" episode, saying it had an "intriguing murder, lots of suspects, and an interesting personal twist for Megan". This episode was nominated at the 21st Annual Environmental Media Awards, however lost out to the CSI: Crime Scene Investigation episode "Fracked".

== Plot ==
Megan Hunt (Dana Delany) and Todd Fleming (Jeffrey Nordling) are called to Lacey's (Mary Mouser) school when she is seen looking at photos of a young woman, Nikki Parkson (Mary Fegreus) who died, after battling a terminal illness. When Megan looks at a photo, she sees irregularities and without permission from Kate Murphy (Jeri Ryan), Megan and Peter Dunlop (Nicholas Bishop) stop Nikki being buried, so they can look at her body, much to the horror of Nikki's mother Lillian (Jill Eikenberry). Although Nikki's family say that she committed suicide, Megan finds evidence to suggest otherwise; Nikki's neck has bruising on the bottom, showing that she was strangled. Nikki was being given pills to help her illness by Lillian, but it turns out they were placebos, making sure her worsening disease keeps Lillian in the social limelight, getting sympathy from friends; however Lillian did not kill her. Samantha Baker (Sonja Sohn), Megan, Ethan Gross (Geoffrey Arend) and Curtis Brumfield (Windell Middlebrooks) find out that Nikki's boyfriend Shane (Charlie Semine) was actually working together with Nikki's sister Sara (Jo Armeniox). It is revealed that Shane and Sara killed Nikki, as in Nikki's will she was giving all her money to a fake wildlife foundation which Sara had set up. However, Nikki wanted to switch charities, so Sara killed her to stop her from doing this, with Shane helping her to stage it as suicide, so they could both get the money.

The two are arrested, and Nikki's funeral takes place. However, Samantha arrives to arrest Lillian, as Nikki's brother Billy (Eric Sheffer Stevens) found the pills Lillian wasn't giving Nikki, and Lillian is charged with interfering with her daughter's medical care. Bill assures Megan that Nikki's money, in her will, will be put to a good use and thanks her and the team for investigating. Throughout the investigation Lacey thinks that Megan and Todd are getting back together, as Todd has made many calls to Megan's work. Lacey is shocked to find out that Todd is not phoning Megan, but Kate, and the two are in a relationship. Megan is angry at Kate, but tells Lacey to respect her, even if she does not like her yet.

== Production ==
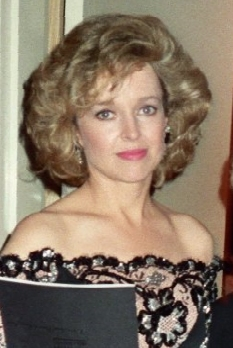
Jill Eikenberry (pictured) played Lillian Parkson, the mother of victim Nikki.

"Broken Home" was written by Andrew Dettman and directed by Nelson McCormick, this being his third episode he directed, having directed the season premiere "Pilot" and the subsequent episode "Letting Go". McCormick has directed many television series such as Third Watch, Nip/Tuck, ER and more recently, Criminal Minds. Daniel Licht, who has worked on the series since its inception, returned to compose the music for the episode. Actress Jill Eikenberry – best known for her role in L.A. Law – and actor Eric Sheffer Stevens – best known for his role in As the World Turns – both guest starred in this episode, as Lillian and Bill Parkson, respectively. Sheffer Stevens later reprised his role as Bill in season two's fifth episode "Point of Origin". Recurring cast members Jeffrey Nordling and Mary Mouser returned in this episode, with this being both Mouser's and Nordling's first appearance since seasons one's seventh episode, "All in the Family". Regular cast member John Carroll Lynch who plays Detective Bud Morris, did not appear in this episode, although he was credited.

"Broken Home", along with the eight episodes from Body of Proof's first season, were released on a two-disc DVD set in the United States on September 20, 2011. The sets included brief audio commentaries from various crew and cast members for several episode's, a preview of season 2 and a 10-minute "featurette" on the making of the show, with commentaries from the medical consultants who helped with the script, as well as a "Contaminated Evidence" blooper reel.

== Reception ==
=== Ratings ===
In its original American broadcast on May 17, 2011, "Broken Home" was seen by 10.33 million viewers, according to Nielsen ratings. Among viewers between ages 18 and 49, it received a 2.1 rating/9 share. This means that it was seen by 2.1 percent of all 18- to 49-year-olds, and 9 percent of all 18- to 49-year-olds watching television at the time of the broadcast. This episode achieved a much higher number of viewers than the previous episode, "Buried Secrets", and a significant higher number than subsequent episode "Love Thy Neighbor", which is season two's premiere. Body of Proof came fifth in the ratings on Tuesday night, being outperformed by the season finales of CBS's NCIS and of The Good Wife as well as two airings of ABC's Dancing with the Stars. "Broken Home" was watched by 1.75 million viewers upon its airing on Channel 5 in the United Kingdom.

=== Critical response ===
"Broken Home" was a solid outing for Body of Proof. It had an intriguing murder, lots of suspects, and an interesting personal twist for Megan. All in all this was a solid episode, but it just didn't live up to my expectations of what a season finale should be. It doesn't have to be a cliff-hanger but I want something that leaves me longing for the next season to begin. However, I am happy that Body of Proof will be coming back for a second season so maybe they'll do it better next time around.

— Christine Orlando,
TV Fanatic

This episode received mixed to positive reviews. Christine Orlando of TV Fanatic said that the plot of the episode had a "nice story arc when the cause of death ranged from disease, to suicide, and finally murder". She added that Nikki's family was a "nightmare". She was surprised that Bill was not involved in killing Nikki, saying that he "came across as a bit of a jerk for most of the episode", adding that Nikki had a "short, sad life". Orlando praised the detail of Nikki's neck, noticing the bruising to show she was strangled. She said, "I generally hate gore yet I found myself fascinated by the autopsy of the girl's neck. Maybe it was the detail of the muscle and the lack of blood but I've never seen such a procedure portrayed with that level of specificity". Orlando carried on saying, "Is there some rule that we can't have both detectives every week? Detective Baker's definitely growing on me but I missed Bud. He and Megan had some great chemistry and I was hoping for more of that by the end of the season". Orlando understood Megan's reaction to the fact that Kate was dating Todd, calling it "justified", saying it was an "odd position to be in", but summarized; "she'll just have to get over it". Orlando was worried whether Todd deserved Kate saying that; "the jury is still out on Todd". She praised how this storyline turned out to be a "great bonding moment" between Megan and Lacey, saying she "liked" that Megan was honest with Lacey adding, "I like it when adults actually act like adults".

This episode was nominated at the 21st Annual Environmental Media Awards, an "organization dedicated to harnessing the power of the entertainment industry and the media to educate the global public on environmental issues and motivate sustainable lifestyles". Under the category "Television Episodic Drama", "Broken Home" was nominated alongside The Good Wife episode "Real Deal" and the winner, the CSI: Crime Scene Investigation episode "Fracked".
