= Tracey Ullman: A Class Act =

1993 British comedy television special

- Genre: Comedy film
- Written by: Dick Clement; Kim Fuller; Gary Howe; Ian La Frenais; Richard Preddy; Tracey Ullman (Note: Special Material)
- Directed by: Les Blair
- Starring: Tracey Ullman; Michael Palin
- Theme music composer: Simon Brint
- Country of origin: United Kingdom

Production
- Executive producers: Allan McKeown; Tony Charles (Note: For Meridian)
- Producer: Jo Wright
- Cinematography: Geoff Harrison
- Editor: Tony Woollard
- Running time: 42 min.
- Production companies: SelecTV; WitzEnd Productions

Original release
- Network: ITV
- Release: 9 January 1993

Related
- Tracey Ullman Takes on New York; Tracey Takes On...

Tracey Ullman: A Class Act is an ITV sketch comedy television special starring Tracey Ullman, along with Michael Palin, playing a variety of original characters.

The show introduced viewers to characters who would go on to be featured in Ullman's American follow-up comedy special and subsequent HBO television series: gay flight attendant Trevor Ayliss; Virginia Bugge, wife to a conservative MP; and future magazine editor Janie Pillsworth, along with her mother, Jackie.

A Class Act aired on HBO in the United States on 23 November 1993. It acted as a follow-up to Ullman's American HBO comedy special, Tracey Ullman Takes on New York. The HBO cut of the special opens with Ullman ("Filling in for Alistair Cooke") explaining the British class system to the American audience.

== Premise ==
The show opens aboard Class Air, a British airline that seats passengers according to social class: lower, middle, and upper.

=== 37 Up ===
In a parody of the British documentary Seven Up!, three children are followed from childhood to adulthood.

=== Powder Room ===
Various characters visit the powder room.

=== Hethers ===
A young girl, Janine Pillsworth, is placed in a posh boarding school by her working-class parents. She subsequently reinvents herself as "Janie" and disowns them.

=== Back on Class Air ===
Airline steward Trevor visits the working class section of the plane and closes the show singing "I Am What I Am".

== Cast ==
- Tracey Ullman as Various
- Michael Palin as Various
- Timothy Spall
- Susan Wooldridge as Virginia Birdsall

== Background ==
After the conclusion of The Tracey Ullman Show in 1990, Ullman decided to take a break from television. She had no desire to return to the format as the demands of doing a weekly show in front of a live studio audience left her exhausted. She also felt creatively fulfilled. In 1991, Ullman was pregnant with her second child and decided to focus her attention on motherhood.

In 1992, her husband, independent British television producer, Allan McKeown placed a bid for a television franchise in the South of England. Included with his bid was a potential television programming lineup which included a Tracey Ullman special. Thinking nothing of it, Ullman continued enjoying her less hectic schedule. To her horror, McKeown's bid was successful, forcing her to return to television.

She decided on a new format and to shoot the entire show on location. This would allow her ample time to apply makeup, wigs, and other accoutrements for the characters at a reasonable pace. When it came to a premise, Ullman decided to focus the show on the British class system, a subject that had interested her since childhood. Tracey Ullman: A Class Act premiered on 9 January 1993 on ITV.

=== Format ===
The show features four sketches, with the first acting as a bookend. Ullman plays a total of eleven characters; she's accompanied in the sketches by Monty Python alumnus Michael Palin who also plays multiple parts.

== Reception ==
=== Awards and nominations ===
Year	Award	Category	Recipient(s)/Nominee(s)	Result	Ref(s)
1995	CableAce Award	International Dramatic or Comedy Special or Series/Movie or Miniseries	Allan McKeown (executive producer), Jo Wright (producer), Les Blair (director), Dick Clement (writer), Kim Fuller (writer), Gary Howe (writer), Ian La Frenais (writer), Richard Preddy (writer)	Nominated	

== Home media ==
A Class Act was released on home video in the UK in 1993. In 2009, the special (HBO version) became available in the United States via iTunes and Amazon Video-On-Demand albeit in an edited for. The character Trevor Ayliss is omitted entirely, as is the concluding song "I Am What I Am". The unedited British cut of the special was made available through Hulu in the United States in 2012.

== Bibliography ==
- Ullman, Tracey (1998). Tracey Takes On. Hyperion. ISBN 978-0-786-86340-2.
