= Tracey Takes On (book) =

Book by Tracey Ullman

- Author: Tracey Ullman
- Language: English
- Subject: Humor
- Publisher: Hyperion
- Publication date: January 23, 1998
- Publication place: United States
- Media type: Print (hardcover and paperback)
- Pages: 259
- ISBN: 978-0-7868-6340-2 (First edition hardcover)
- OCLC: 37509927
- Dewey Decimal: 818.5402
- LC Class: PN6162 .U45 1998

Tracey Takes On is a 1998 book based on the HBO sketch comedy series of the same name, and is authored by its star Tracey Ullman. The majority of the book's material is taken from the show's first two seasons. Sketches are presented in the form of letters, newspaper articles, diary entries, magazine interviews, questionnaires, and so on. Each character gets its own dedicated font and letterhead. The book is illustrated with official character press photos and screen captures. Like the series, each chapter opens with a personal story from Ullman in relation to each chapter's subject. Unaired or unused sketches and some new material can also be found in the book. It also comes with character biographies and paper dolls.

== Chapters ==
1. Introduction
2. Character Biographies
3. Childhood
4. Royalty
5. Mothers
6. Crime
7. Family
8. Money
9. Sex
10. Fame
11. Movies
12. Health
13. Politics
14. Miscellaneous
15. Character Costumes

== Critical reception ==
People Magazine gave the book a positive review, stating "[i]t's not for sensitive souls who are put off by gross and politically incorrect humor. But Tracey Takes On, like its wildly talented author, is very funny." Entertainment Weekly gave the book a B+.
