= Todd Oldham =

American fashion designer

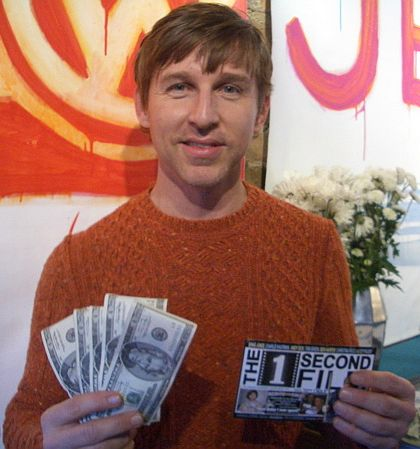
- Oldham for The 1 Second Film in January 2005
- Born: Jacky Todd Oldham; Corpus Christi, Texas, U.S.

Todd Oldham (born Jacky Todd Oldham; 1961) is an American-born designer and president of L-7 Designs Inc and Todd Oldham Studios. His approach to fashion and style has become known to millions through his fashion lines, interior designs, books and by appearing in television shows. Oldham is based in New York City.

== Biography ==
=== Early life ===
Oldham was born Jacky Todd Oldham in Corpus Christi, Texas, to Jack and Linda Oldham and is one of four children. At age 15, he designed his first dress when he stitched together some pillowcases. His father was a computer programmer and the family moved around due to his father’s job. At one point, his family lived in Iran. He moved to Dallas, Texas, after graduating from high school. His first job was in the alterations department at the Polo Ralph Lauren. He borrowed $50 from his parents, bought 41 yards of white cotton jersey, dyed it and put together a tiny collection that he sold to Neiman Marcus.

=== Career ===
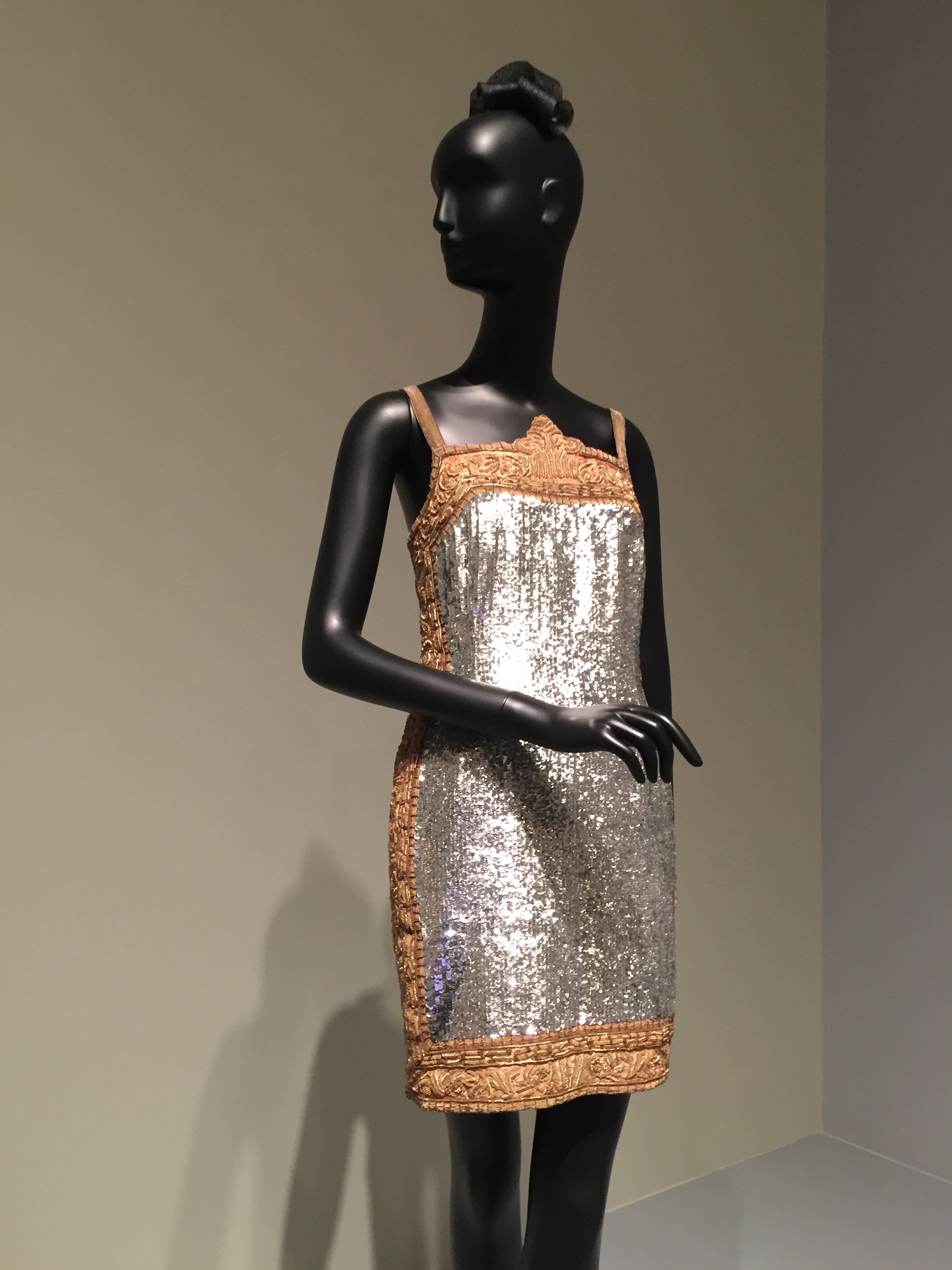
"Mirror" evening dress by Todd Oldham, Fall 1992 (PMA)

During his early days in Dallas, Oldham showed his first collection in 1981, launched his first clothing line in 1989 and won the Council of Fashion Designer Perry Ellis Award for New Fashion Talent in 1991. In 1988, Oldham moved to New York City with his business partner, Tony Longoria. Oldham served as creative consultant to Escada between 1995 and 1997. He launched a perfume line in 1995 and designed a home accessories line for Target (2002–2003). In 1995, he produced a clothing line associated with the Warner Brothers film Batman Forever. Oldham designed furniture and home accessories for La-Z-Boy furniture (2003–2007) and served as creative director for Old Navy. He designed under his own label in New York from 1989-1999.

From August 2022 through November 2024, Oldham returned to fashion with a line called Todd Oldham Maker Shop. When he left fashion design in 1999, Oldham archived all of the leftover fabrics, buttons, and jewelry from the past 10 years of designing his collections. These leftovers were then used with Todd Oldham Maker Shop where he created new clothes for women and men, home goods, accessories, and jewelry from the vintage materials.

When he left the fashion industry, he dispersed his archive to the Texas Fashion Collection and the RISD Museum, which held the 2016 exhibition "All of Everything: Todd Oldham Fashion," a retrospective of his fashion career.

Oldham designed The Hotel of South Beach in 1999. He later designed an oceanfront addition that debuted in January 2010.

Todd Oldham has become widely known to American TV audiences through his many television appearances. Most notably, Oldham was the host of the "Todd Time" segment on MTV's House of Style from 1993 to 1999. His appearances on House of Style has been credited with advancing his career during the 1990s. He has also hosted Fashionably Loud on MTV in 1999 and recently served as mentor to contestants on Bravo's Top Design. He was a guest star, portraying himself, on a season three episode of The Nanny.

Oldham is also actively involved in book publishing. He has produced a number of books on various aspects of style for Ammo Books as part of the Place Space series. Books in the series include photos and essays on filmmaker John Waters, the artist compound in upstate New York owned by Joe Holtzman (the founder of Nest magazine), and the Rhode Island School of Design's off-campus housing and Bedrock City. Oldham has created Hand Made Modern, Without Boundaries, and various other titles. In June 2007, Oldham released a monograph of artist Charley Harper’s work titled An Illustrated Life. He has subsequently released monographs on Wayne White and Ed Emberley. In 2018, he won the Israel Fishman Nonfiction Stonewall Book Award for his book Queer Threads: Crafting Identity and Community.

=== Philanthropy ===
Oldham is on the advisory board of the Amazon Conservation Team (ACT), to work in partnership with indigenous people in conserving biodiversity, health and culture in South America. He is also on the board of Aperture, a nonprofit foundation dedicated to promoting photography. Oldham has been involved with Habitat for Humanity, Bailey House, the oldest supportive housing program for persons with HIV and AIDS in the United States, and People for the Ethical Treatment of Animals.

=== Personal life ===
Oldham is openly gay. His longtime partner is Tony Longoria.

== See also ==
- LGBT culture in New York City
- List of LGBT people from New York City
- NYC Pride March
