= List of Tracey Ullman performances =

English and American actress

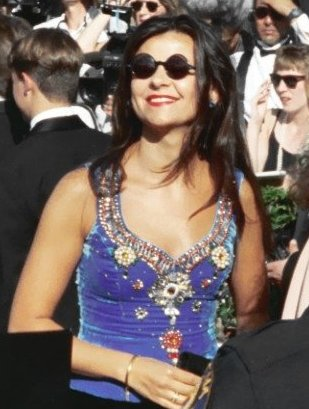
Ullman at the 46th Primetime Emmy Awards in 1994

Tracey Ullman is a British and American actress who has had an extensive career in television, film, and theatre, working in both comedy and drama. Her sketch comedy television programmes have garnered numerous awards in both the United States and the United Kingdom. She began her stage career in the mid-1970s, starring in various West End musicals and dramas before making her first television appearance in 1980 as Lisa Mackenzie in the British drama series Mackenzie. In 1981, the BBC cast her in two ensemble comedy sketch shows: A Kick Up the Eighties and Three of a Kind, the latter alongside Lenny Henry and David Copperfield. In 1983, Ullman launched a brief but successful music career, garnering several chart hits and appearing on Top of the Pops. In 1985, she was cast in the ITV sitcom Girls on Top alongside Dawn French, Jennifer Saunders, and Ruby Wax. She came to the attention of producer James L. Brooks after her critically acclaimed, BAFTA-nominated performance in the film drama Plenty (1985). Brooks created and produced her first American television comedy programme, The Tracey Ullman Show, in 1987. The show spun off the longest-running American scripted primetime television series, The Simpsons. Her first big-screen leading role came in 1990 in I Love You to Death. She subsequently appeared in films such as Robin Hood: Men in Tights (1993), Nancy Savoca's Household Saints (1993), Bullets Over Broadway (1994), and Small Time Crooks (2000). In 1993, she returned to television with the comedy specials Tracey Ullman: A Class Act for ITV in the United Kingdom and Tracey Ullman Takes on New York for HBO in the United States. The success of these specials led to the creation of Tracey Takes On... and a long career producing and starring in programmes created for American cable television. After a thirty-year absence, she returned to the BBC, creating the sketch comedy programme Tracey Ullman's Show in 2016. In 2020, she starred in the FX historical drama television miniseries Mrs. America as Betty Friedan, earning both critical praise and accolades.

== Filmography ==
Key
†	Denotes works that have not yet been released

=== Film ===
Year	Title	Role	Notes
1984	Give My Regards to Broad Street	Sandra	
1984	The Young Visiters	Ethel Monticue	
1985	Plenty	Alice Park	Nominated - BAFTA Award for Best Actress in a Supporting Role
1986	Jumpin' Jack Flash	Fiona	
1989	Happily Ever After	Thunderella / Moonbeam (voice)	
1990	I Love You to Death	Rosalie Boca	
1992	Death Becomes Her	Toni	Scenes deleted
1993	Robin Hood: Men in Tights	Latrine	
1993	Household Saints	Catherine Falconetti	
1994	I'll Do Anything	Beth Hobbs	
1994	Bullets Over Broadway	Eden Brent	
1994	Prêt-à-Porter	Nina Scant	
1996	Everyone Says I Love You		Scenes deleted
2000	Panic	Martha	
2000	Small Time Crooks	Frenchy	Nominated – Golden Globe Award for Best Actress in a Motion Picture – Comedy or Musical
2000	C-Scam		
2004	A Dirty Shame	Sylvia Stickles	
2004	The Cat That Looked at a King	The Cat (voice)	Video
2005	Corpse Bride	Nell Van Dort / Hildegarde (voice)	
2005	Kronk's New Groove	Ms. Birdwell (voice)	Video
2006	The Queen	Self (uncredited)	Archive footage
2007	I Could Never Be Your Woman	Mother Nature	
2008	The Tale of Despereaux	Mig (voice)	
2014	Into the Woods	Jack's Mother	
2020	Onward	Grecklin (voice)	
2020	The Prom	Vera Glickman	
2021	Highway One	—N/a	Associate producer
2025	The Actor	Mrs. Malloy / Helen / Deerville Woman	
2025	Steve	Amanda	
2025	Ella McCay	Olympia (voice)	
2026	Mel Brooks: The 99 Year Old Man!	Herself	Documentary
2026	Hexed	Ms. Quill (voice)	
2027	Gatto †	Luisa (voice)	

=== Television ===
Year	Title	Role	Notes
1980	Mackenzie	Lisa Mackenzie	Television series
1981	Screenplay	Karen	Episode: "Happy Since I Met You"
1981	A Kick Up the Eighties	Various	Television series
1981–1983	Three of a Kind	Various	Television series
1982	Four in a Million	Beverley	Television film
1982	A Cut Above	Samantha	
1982	The Funny Side of Christmas	Various	Television film
1985	Girls on Top	Candice Valentine	Series 1, 1 episode in Series 2; additional material credit
1987–1990	The Tracey Ullman Show	Various	Television series
1987	Saturday Night Live	Herself (uncredited)	Episode: "Garry Shandling/Los Lobos" "Hollywood Mom" (sketch)
1989	Sesame Street	Herself / Trasha	Episode 2584; Season 20; 6 April 1989
1989	I, Martin Short, Goes Hollywood	Tina Wise	Television film
1991	The Full Wax	Herself	Episode: #1.4
1991	The Simpsons	Emily Winthrop / Mrs. Winfield (voice)	Episode: "Bart's Dog Gets an 'F'"
1991	Funny Women of Television	Herself	
1992	Sibs	Beatrice	Episode: "If I Only Had a Dad"
1993	Love & War	Dava Levine	Episode: "The Prima Dava"
1993	Tracey Ullman: A Class Act	Various	Additional material credit
1993	Tracey Ullman Takes on New York	Various	Television special
1995	The Little Lulu Show	Lulu (voice)	Season 1
1995	Women of the Night IV	Herself	Host
1996–1999	Tracey Takes On...	Various	Creator, writer, executive producer, second unit director (season 4)
1998–1999	Ally McBeal	Dr. Tracey Clark	5 episodes
2001–2002	Tracey Ullman's Visible Panty Lines	Herself	Television series
2003	Tracey Ullman in the Trailer Tales	Ruby Romaine / Svetlana / Pepper Kane	Directorial debut; writer, executive producer
2004	Will & Grace	Ann	Episode: "Looking for Mr. Good Enough"
2005	Tracey Ullman: Live and Exposed	Herself	Executive producer, writer
2005	Once Upon a Mattress	Princess Winnifred	Television film
2006	Dawn French's Girls Who Do Comedy	Herself	3 episodes
2007	If It Ain't Stiff	Herself	Documentary
2008–2010	Tracey Ullman's State of the Union	Various	Creator, writer, director, executive producer
2008	Mumbai Calling	Telephone Voice (voice)	7 episodes
2011	Kennedy Center Honors	Herself	Tribute to Meryl Streep
2014	How I Met Your Mother	Genevieve Scherbatsky	3 episodes
2014	Sofia the First	Marla (voice)	Episode: "Mom's the Word"
2015	Shakespeare Uncovered	Herself	Episode: "The Taming of the Shrew With Morgan Freeman"
2016–2018	Tracey Ullman's Show	Various	Devised by credit, executive producer
2016; 2018	Have I Got News for You	Herself	Guest presenter; 2 episodes
2017	Girls	Ode Montgomery	Episode: "Painful Evacuation"
2017	Tracey Breaks the News	Various	Devised by credit, executive producer
2017–2018	Tracey Breaks the News	Various	Television series
2017	Howards End	Aunt Juley Mund	Miniseries
2017	The President Show	Herself	Episode: "I Came Up with Christmas: A President Show Christmas"
2018	Zog	Madame Dragon / Governess (voice)	
2018–2019	Billy Connolly: Made in Scotland	Herself	Documentary; 2 episodes
2020	Mrs. America	Betty Friedan	Miniseries
2020	Death to 2020	Queen Elizabeth II	Television special
2021–2024	Curb Your Enthusiasm	Irma Kostroski	9 episodes
2021	Death to 2021	Madison Madison	Television special
2024	Black Doves	Alex Clark	2 episodes
2025; 2026	Elsbeth	Marilyn Gladwell / Betty Heymouth	Episodes: "I See... Murder", "Catch and Kill"
2026	Ted Lasso	Zelda Southport	Season 4
TBA	Alien: Earth †	TBA	Filming

=== Directing, producing and writing ===
Year	Title	Director	Producer	Writer
1985	Girls on Top	No	No	Yes (Note: Additional material credit.)
1987–1990	The Tracey Ullman Show	No	No	Yes
1993	Tracey Ullman: A Class Act	No	No	Yes
1996–1999	Tracey Takes On...	Yes (Note: Second unit director (Season 4).)	Executive	Yes
2001–2002	Tracey Ullman's Visible Panty Lines	No	Executive	No
2003	Tracey Ullman in the Trailer Tales	Yes	Executive	Yes
2005	Tracey Ullman: Live and Exposed	No	Executive	Yes
2008–2010	Tracey Ullman's State of the Union	Yes (Note: Season 3 only.)	Executive	Yes
2016–2018	Tracey Ullman's Show	No	Executive	Yes
2017–2018	Tracey Breaks the News	No	Executive	Yes
2021	Highway One	No	Yes (Note: Associate producer.)	No

== Theatre ==
Year	Production	Role	Location
1976	Gigi		Theater des Westens, Berlin
1977	Second Generation		Blackpool and Liverpool
1977/1978	Aladdin		Liverpool Empire
1978	Elvis The Musical		London Astoria
1978	Oh! Boy		London Astoria
1979	Grease	Frenchy	London Astoria
1979	The Rocky Horror Show	Janet	Comedy Theatre
1980	Talent	Julie	Everyman Theatre
1980	It's a Madhouse	Vera	Everyman Theatre
1980	Zack	Sally	Everyman Theatre
1980	Gloo Joo	Irene	
1980	Dracula	Lucy	Young Vic
1981	Four in a Million	Beverly	Royal Court Theatre
1981–1982	Dick Whittington	Dick	Theatre Royal, Newcastle
1982	Rita, Sue and Bob Too	Bob's wife	Royal Court Theatre
1982	She Stoops to Conquer	Kate Hardcastle	Lyric Hammersmith
1982	Bows and Arrows	Henrietta	Young Writer's Festival
1983	The Grass Widow	Carmen	Royal Court Theatre
1990	The Taming of the Shrew	Kate	Delacorte Theater
1991	The Big Love	Florence Aadland	The Orpheum Theatre
2005	Tracey Ullman: Live and Exposed	Self	The Fonda Theatre
2011	My City	Elizabeth Lambert	Almeida Theatre
2012	What About Dick?	Aunt Maggie / Enid Bastard / The Countess von Kunst	The Orpheum Theatre
2014	The Band Wagon	Lily Martin	New York City Center

== Radio ==
Year	Title	Role	Notes
1981–1983	Week Ending	Various	Topical sketch series
2021	Desert Island Discs	Herself	Interviewee

== See also ==
- List of awards and nominations received by Tracey Ullman
