= List of awards and nominations received by Tracey Ullman =

Tracey Ullman awards and nominations
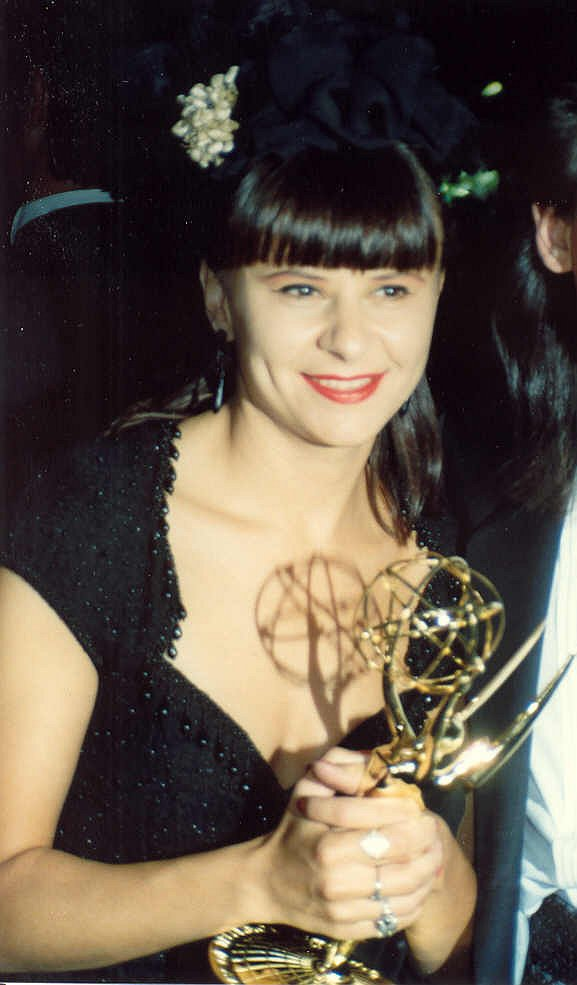
- Ullman at the 41st Primetime Emmy Awards in 1989
Awards and nominations
Award	Wins	Nominations
Actor Awards	1	3
American Comedy Awards	12	14
BAFTAs	2	3
Golden Globes Awards	1	5
Primetime Emmy Awards	7	27
Satellite Awards	4	4

Totals (Note: Certain award groups do not simply award one winner. They acknowledge several different recipients, have runners-up, and have third place. Since this is a specific recognition and is different from losing an award, runner-up mentions are considered wins in this award tally. For simplification and to avoid errors, each award in this list has been presumed to have had a prior nomination.)
- Wins: 40
- Nominations: 83

This article is a list of awards and nominations received by Tracey Ullman.

Tracey Ullman is a British and American actress known for her extensive work in television, film, theatre, and music, for which she has received numerous accolades. To date, Ullman has won twelve American Comedy Awards, seven Primetime Emmy Awards, two British Academy Film Awards, four Satellite Awards, one Golden Globe Award, and an Actor Award. On 5 December 2006, she was honoured by the Museum of Television and Radio in the "She Made It" category, alongside Carol Burnett, Lesley Visser, Lesley Stahl, Jane Pauley, and Betty White. In April 2009, it was announced that Ullman would be presented with the BAFTA Lifetime Achievement Award the following month. On 9 May 2009, she became the inaugural recipient of the Charlie Chaplin Lifetime Achievement Award for Comedy.

== Major associations ==
=== Actor Awards ===
Year	Category	Nominated work	Result	Ref(s)
1999	Outstanding Performance by a Female Actor in a Comedy Series	Tracey Takes On...	Won	
2000	Outstanding Performance by a Female Actor in a Comedy Series	Tracey Takes On...	Nominated	
2009	Outstanding Performance by a Female Actor in a Comedy Series	Tracey Ullman's State of the Union	Nominated	

=== British Academy of Film and Television Arts ===
Year	Category	Nominated work	Result	Ref(s)
1984	Best Light Entertainment Performance	Three of a Kind	Won	
1986	Best Actress in a Supporting Role	Plenty	Nominated	
2009	Lifetime Achievement Award		Honored	

=== Golden Globe Awards ===
Year	Category	Nominated work	Result	Ref(s)
1988	Best Performance by an Actress in a Television Series – Musical or Comedy	The Tracey Ullman Show	Won	
1989	Best Performance by an Actress in a Television Series – Musical or Comedy	The Tracey Ullman Show	Nominated	
1990	Best Performance by an Actress in a Television Series – Musical or Comedy	The Tracey Ullman Show	Nominated	
1997	Best Performance by an Actress in a Television Series – Musical or Comedy	Tracey Takes On...	Nominated	
2001	Best Actress in a Motion Picture – Musical or Comedy	Small Time Crooks	Nominated	

=== Primetime Emmy Awards ===
Year	Category	Nominated work	Result	Ref(s)
1987	Outstanding Variety, Music or Comedy Program	The Tracey Ullman Show	Nominated	
1988	Outstanding Writing in a Variety or Music Program	The Tracey Ullman Show	Nominated	
1988	Outstanding Variety, Music or Comedy Program	The Tracey Ullman Show	Nominated	
1989	Outstanding Writing in a Variety or Music Program	The Tracey Ullman Show	Nominated	
1989	Outstanding Variety, Music or Comedy Program	The Tracey Ullman Show	Won	
1990	Outstanding Variety, Music or Comedy Series	The Tracey Ullman Show	Nominated	
1990	Outstanding Writing in a Variety or Music Program	The Tracey Ullman Show	Won	
1990	Outstanding Individual Performance in a Variety or Music Program	The Best of the Tracey Ullman Show	Won	
1993	Outstanding Guest Actress in a Comedy Series	Love & War	Won	
1994	Outstanding Individual Performance in a Variety or Music Program	Tracey Ullman Takes on New York	Won	
1995	Outstanding Individual Performance in a Variety or Music Program	Women of the Night IV	Nominated	
1996	Outstanding Writing for a Variety or Music Program	Tracey Takes On...	Nominated	
1996	Outstanding Variety, Music or Comedy Special	The Best of Tracey Takes On...	Nominated	
1996	Outstanding Individual Performance in a Variety or Music Program	The Best of Tracey Takes On...	Nominated	
1997	Outstanding Writing for a Variety or Music Program	Tracey Takes On...	Nominated	
1997	Outstanding Performance in a Variety or Music Program	Tracey Takes On...	Nominated	
1997	Outstanding Variety, Music or Comedy Series	Tracey Takes On...	Won	
1998	Outstanding Variety, Music or Comedy Series	Tracey Takes On...	Nominated	
1998	Outstanding Performance in a Variety or Music Program	Tracey Takes On...	Nominated	
1999	Outstanding Variety, Music or Comedy Series	Tracey Takes On...	Nominated	
1999	Outstanding Performance in a Variety or Music Program	Tracey Takes On...	Nominated	
1999	Outstanding Guest Actress in a Comedy Series	Ally McBeal	Won	
2004	Outstanding Individual Performance in a Variety or Music Program	Tracey Ullman in the Trailer Tales	Nominated	
2005	Outstanding Individual Performance in a Variety or Music Program	Tracey Ullman: Live and Exposed	Nominated	
2017	Outstanding Variety Sketch Series	Tracey Ullman's Show	Nominated	
2018	Outstanding Variety Sketch Series	Tracey Ullman's Show	Nominated	
2020	Outstanding Supporting Actress in a Limited Series or Movie	Mrs. America	Nominated	

== Miscellaneous awards ==
Organizations	Year (Note: Indicates the year of the ceremony.)	Category	Work	Result	Ref.
American Comedy Awards	1988	Funniest Female Performer of the Year		Won	
American Comedy Awards	1988	Funniest Female Performer in a TV Special	The Tracey Ullman Show	Won	
American Comedy Awards	1989	Funniest Female Performer in a TV Special	Tracey Ullman: Backstage	Won	
American Comedy Awards	1990	Funniest Female Performer in a TV Special	The Tracey Ullman Show	Won	
American Comedy Awards	1991	Funniest Female Performer in a TV Special	The Tracey Ullman Show	Won	
American Comedy Awards	1992	Funniest Female Performer in a TV Special	Funny Women of Television	Won	
American Comedy Awards	1994	Funniest Female Performer in a TV Special	Tracey Ullman Takes on New York	Won	
American Comedy Awards	1996	Funniest Female Performer in a TV Special	Women of the Night IV	Won	
American Comedy Awards	1998	Funniest Female Performer in a TV Special	Tracey Takes On...	Won	
American Comedy Awards	1999	Funniest Female Performer in a TV Special	Tracey Takes On...	Won	
American Comedy Awards	1999	Funniest Female Guest Appearance in a TV Series	Ally McBeal	Won	
American Comedy Awards	2000	Funniest Female Performer in a TV Series	Tracey Takes On...	Won	
American Comedy Awards	2000	Funniest Female Guest Appearance in a TV Series	Ally McBeal	Nominated	
American Comedy Awards	2001	Funniest Actress in a Motion Picture	Small Time Crooks	Nominated	
Astra TV Awards	2025	Best Guest Actress in a Drama Series	Black Doves	Nominated	
Boston Society of Film Critics	1994	Best Supporting Actress	Bullets over Broadway; I'll Do Anything; Prêt-à-Porter	3rd place	
CableACE Awards	1995	Performance in a Comedy Special	Tracey Ullman Takes on New York	Won	
CableACE Awards	1996	Actress in a Comedy Series	Tracey Takes On...	Won	
CableACE Awards	1996	Variety Special or Series	Tracey Takes On...	Won	
Critics' Choice Television Awards	2021	Best Limited/Movie Supporting Actress	Mrs. America	Nominated	
Detroit Film Critics Society	2014	Best Ensemble	Into the Woods	Nominated (Note: Shared with the cast.)	
Gold Derby Awards	2005	Variety Performer	Tracey Ullman: Live and Exposed	Nominated	
Gold Derby Awards	2015	Ensemble Cast	Into the Woods	Nominated	
National Board of Review	1994	Best Acting by an Ensemble	Prêt-à-Porter	Won	
Online Film & Television Association	1998	Best Host or Performer in a Variety, Musical, or Comedy Series	Tracey Takes On...	Won	
Online Film & Television Association	1998	Best Actress in a Cable Series	Tracey Takes On...	Won	
Online Film & Television Association	1999	Best Host or Performer in a Variety, Musical, or Comedy Series	Tracey Takes On...	Won	
Online Film & Television Association	1999	Best Guest Actress in a Comedy Series	Ally McBeal	Nominated	
Phoenix Film Critics Society Awards	2014	Best Ensemble Acting	Into the Woods	Nominated	
Satellite Awards	1998	Best Actress in a Series, Comedy or Musical	Tracey Takes On...	Won	
Satellite Awards	2008	Best Actress in a Series, Comedy or Musical	Tracey Ullman's State of the Union	Won	
Satellite Awards	2014	Best Ensemble, Motion Picture	Into the Woods	Won	
Satellite Awards	2021	Best Supporting Actress – Series, Miniseries or Television Film	Mrs. America	Won	
Washington D.C. Area Film Critics Association	2014	Best Acting Ensemble	Into the Woods	Nominated	
Writers Guild of America Awards	1997	Comedy/Variety (Including Talk) – Series	Tracey Takes On...	Nominated	

== Theatre ==
=== Drama Desk Award ===
Year	Category	Nominated work	Result
1991	Outstanding Solo Performance	The Big Love	Nominated

=== Evening Standard Theatre Awards ===
Year	Category	Nominated work	Result
2011	Best Actress	My City	Nominated

=== London Film Critics' Circle ===
Year	Category	Nominated work	Result	Ref(s)
1981	Most Promising New Actress	Four in a Million	Won	

=== Theatre World Award ===
Year	Category	Nominated work	Result	Ref(s)
1991	Outstanding New York Debut	Taming of the Shrew	Won	
1991	Outstanding New York Debut	The Big Love	Won	

== Music ==
=== Brit Awards ===
Year	Category	Nominated work	Result
1984	British Female Solo Artist	Tracey Ullman	Nominated
1984	British Breakthrough Act	Tracey Ullman	Nominated

== Honorary ==
Year	Organisation	Award	Result	Ref(s)
1995	Women in Film Crystal + Lucy Awards	Lucy Award	Honored	
2000	Banff World Media Festival	Sir Peter Ustinov Award	Honored	
2006	Paley Center for Media	She Made It	Honored	
