= Tracey Ullman's State of the Union =

Television series

- Created by: Tracey Ullman
- Directed by: Troy Miller; Tracey Ullman
- Starring: Tracey Ullman
- Narrated by: Peter Strauss
- Opening theme: Symphony No. 9
- Composer: Richard Gibbs
- Country of origin: United States
- Original language: English
- No. of seasons: 3
- No. of episodes: 19 (list of episodes)

Production
- Executive producers: Tracey Ullman; Allan McKeown; Bruce Wagner
- Producers: Gail Parent (2008); Shawn Wilt (2008); Melissa Wylie (2009); Melanie Patterson (2010)
- Cinematography: Anthony Hardwick (2008); Peter Lyons Collister (2009); Rob Sweeney (2010)
- Editors: Kabir Akhtar (2008); Rick Kent (2008–2010); Roderick Kent (2009); John M. Valerio (2009); Marcelo Sansevieri (2010)
- Running time: 25 minutes
- Production company: Allan McKeown Presents

Original release
- Network: Showtime
- Release: March 30, 2008 – March 8, 2010

Tracey Ullman's State of the Union is an American sketch comedy television series starring Tracey Ullman. The series is written by Ullman along with Hollywood satirist Bruce Wagner. Gail Parent and Craig DiGregorio act as contributing writers to the series' first season. The show ran for three seasons on Showtime. On May 17, 2010, it was announced that the show would not be returning for a fourth season.

== Premise ==
The show takes a satirical look at a day in the life of America.

== Cast ==
- Tracey Ullman as Various
- Scott Bakula as Chris Fulbright
- Jennifer Fitzgerald as Various
- Jo Ann Harris as Various
- Lily Holleman as Various
- Johnny McKeown as Various
- Sam McMurray as Various
- Larry Poindexter as Various
- Vonda Shepard as Various
- Dylan Sprayberry as Jesse
- Lynne Marie Stewart as Various
- Peter Strauss as Narrator

== Background ==
After her HBO sketch comedy television series Tracey Takes On... ended in 1999, Ullman looked to take a break from her multi-character television work. Her initial plan was to develop a new show where she would play, at most, three characters. In the interim, she continued to work in film and managed her e-commerce boutique, Purple Skirt. The boutique's website eventually served as the inspiration for her fashion-based talk show, Tracey Ullman's Visible Panty Lines, which debuted on Oxygen in 2001.

She returned to HBO in 2003 with the television special Tracey Ullman in the Trailer Tales, which she both produced and directed, followed by a film version of her one-woman show, Tracey Ullman: Live and Exposed, in 2005. Though she eventually approached HBO with an idea for a new sketch comedy series, the network was not in the market for it at the time.

Ullman then took the concept to Showtime. Robert Greenblatt, then President of Entertainment at Showtime, remembered Ullman from his early career at Fox. Greenblatt stated: "I have always loved Tracey Ullman ever since I was a young development executive at Fox when she was doing the original The Tracey Ullman Show... She is a one-of-a-kind comedienne and sketch comedy performer, a true artist. We are so proud to bring her to Showtime in a completely new show that will again showcase what she does best, and in this case, she will be looking at the wide cross-section of Americans and both celebrating us and sending us up."

=== Format ===
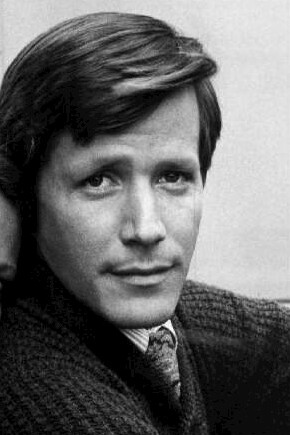
Peter Strauss narrates the series

The show is shot in a cutaway fashion, with each sketch lasting only a few seconds to a few minutes, much like a YouTube clip, a style Ullman was looking to achieve. Each episode takes place within a 24-hour period and is narrated throughout by actor Peter Strauss.

Showtime's Robert Greenblatt explained, "No sketch is longer than a minute and a half. Each episode is a day in the life of the United States. You pop in on people all over the country, really quick visits. You'll go to some famous people. You'll see some recognizable faces and some regular Americans. You revisit characters from episode to episode. You'll go in and out, like the Google map of the U.S., in and out from the outer atmosphere. You'll go to Iowa and visit two women on a farm and then you'll pull out and go to Los Angeles and see Arianna Huffington, played by Ullman, in her boudoir, and then pull out and go to Washington, D.C., and see a woman who's an anchor for the evening news. Ullman will play 90 percent of the characters, men and women."

== Episodes ==
Season	Episodes	Originally released	
Season	Episodes	First released	Last released
1	5	March 30, 2008	April 27, 2008
2	7	April 12, 2009	May 24, 2009
3	7	January 25, 2010	March 8, 2010

== Characters ==
=== Celebrity impersonations ===
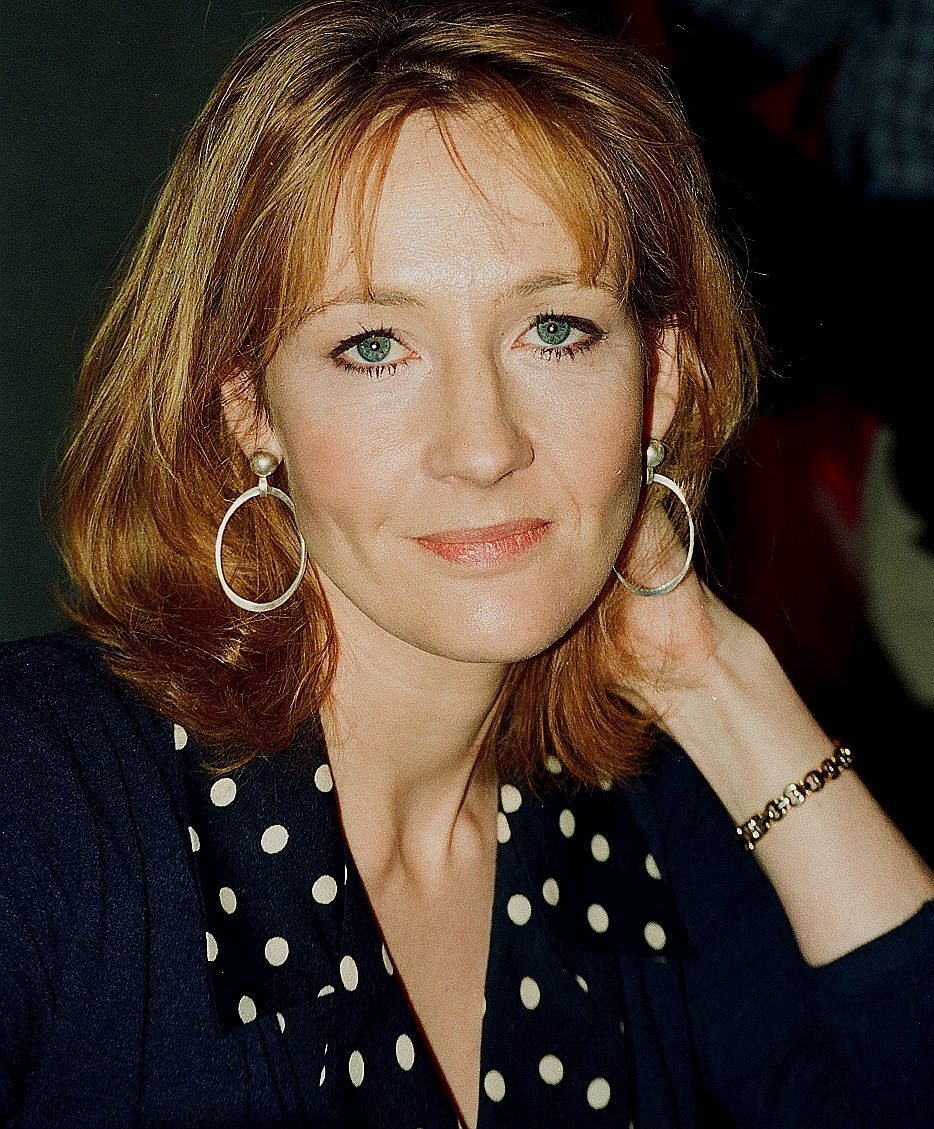
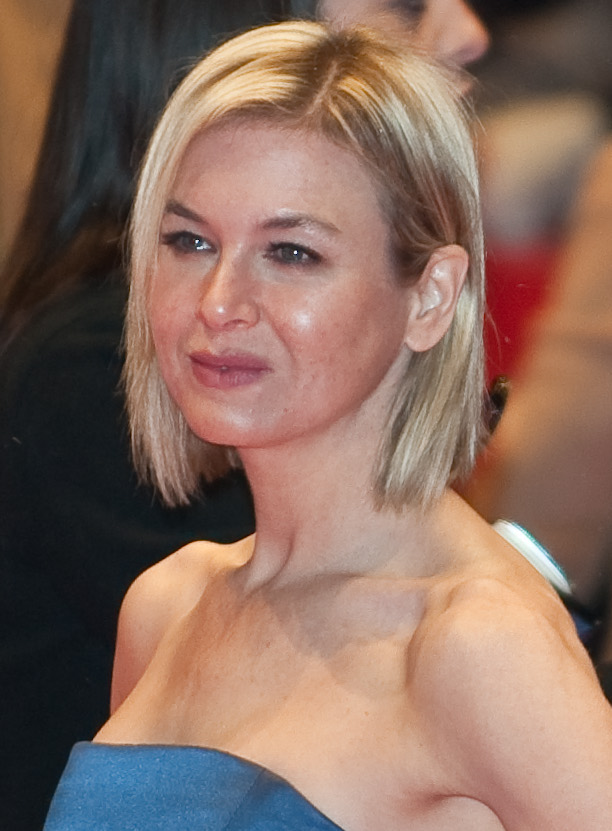
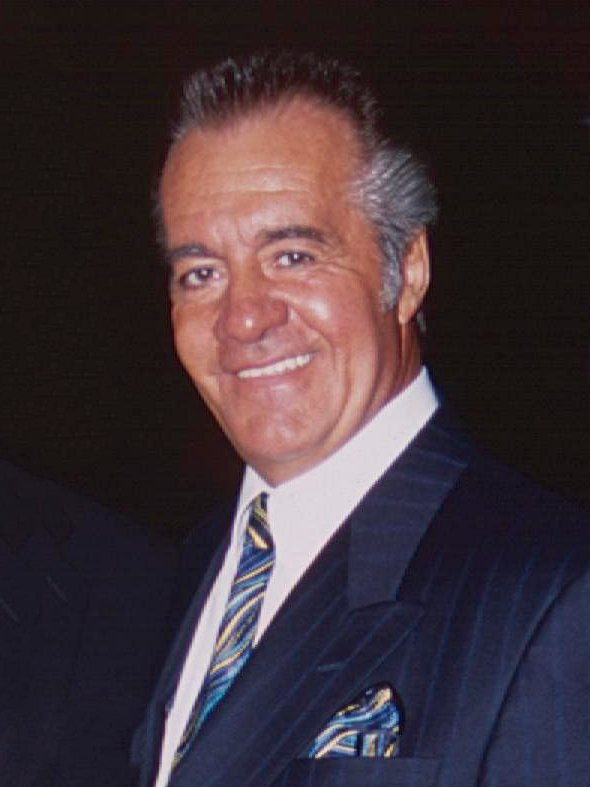
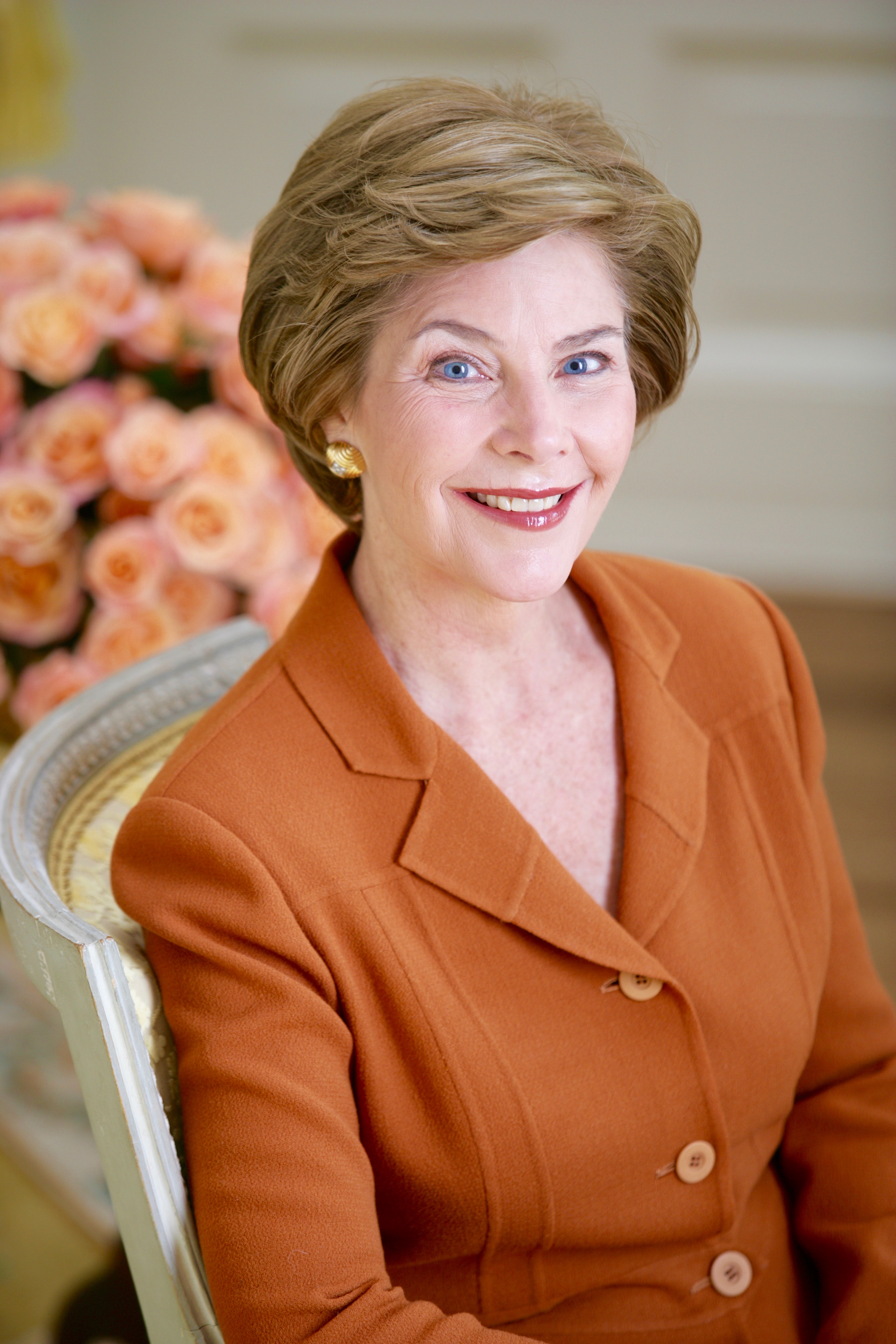
Ullman impersonates celebrities such as J. K. Rowling (top left), Renée Zellweger (top right), Tony Sirico (bottom left), and Laura Bush (bottom right) in the series

The following is a complete list of celebrities impersonated by Tracey Ullman in the show.

- Christiane Amanpour
- David Beckham
- Victoria Beckham
- Susan Boyle
- Tom Brokaw
- Campbell Brown
- Carla Bruni
- Laura Bush
- Rita Cosby
- Penélope Cruz
- Laurie David
- Judi Dench
- Cameron Diaz
- Celine Dion
- Jodie Foster
- Barney Frank
- Ruth Bader Ginsburg
- Len Goodman
- Jonah Hill
- Arianna Huffington
- Donna Karan
- Caroline Kennedy
- Dina Lohan
- Rachel Maddow
- Ruth Madoff
- Meghan McCain
- Matthew McConaughey
- Heather Mills
- Helen Mirren
- Nancy Pelosi
- Miuccia Prada
- Seth Rogen
- Andy Rooney
- Debbie Rowe
- J. K. Rowling
- Tony Sirico
- Suzanne Somers
- Sonia Sotomayor
- Candy Spelling
- Angela Suleman
- Kate Winslet
- Renée Zellweger

== Reception ==
=== Critical response ===
The series received overwhelmingly positive reviews, with many critics dissecting elements of the show, including the length of the sketches, the show's format, and its celebrity mock-ups. Suggesting that Ullman's stronger portrayals are found in her original characters rather than the famous ones, one reviewer wrote, "Ullman's satire is at its best when she inhabits the little people." Others praised its collection of famous and semi-famous impersonations, including Arianna Huffington, "who sleeps with her laptop and has a dramatic Eva Gabor accent and penchant for using 'blog' in every part of her speech." "Her best moments came as Arianna, Dina [Lohan] and Laurie [David]", stated April MacIntyre of Monsters & Critics.

Its YouTube format garnered a few complaints. "...She can do so much, initially she's doing too much. Though fun, the opener's skits are too short, and the characters too numerous, for any one joke to register. But give the show a week to settle, and the strengths of Ullman's concept come to the fore. As the show grows clearer and funnier, you may even find yourself anticipating the return of favorite characters..."

Commenting on the writing, a critic noted, "Ullman is obviously great at impressions, but it's the sharpness of the writing that sets this show apart from other sketch comedies. Ullman tosses off so many excellent one-liners along the way, it's hard to keep track of them all."

"It may take Saturday Night Live a season to put out this many funny characters and celebrity portrayals. But the glossy "State of the Union", narrated by Peter Strauss, churns out a dozen or more in each week's half-hour."

=== Ratings ===
The show's premiere episode was watched by 907,000 viewers for its first night of three airings, with 776,000 tuning in during the 10 p.m. and 10:30 p.m. broadcasts (just short of the debut total for the Showtime series Californication, which drew 795,000 viewers). Pre-airings of State of the Union were available through cable television's On Demand service weeks before its official premiere on the network.

=== Celebrity reaction ===
Celebrity impersonations have become a recent addition to Ullman's comedic repertoire, something that she had not done since her early days at the BBC, nearly thirty years prior. The famous and the infamous are parodied in State of the Union. Reaction to the parodies came from the actual celebrities themselves.

One of the first reactions came from actress Renée Zellweger. In a sketch, Zellweger is featured on a press junket for her new movie, where her character has a condition called "chronic narcissistic squint". The real Zellweger was shown a picture of Ullman doing an impersonation of her on the Late Show with David Letterman. Ullman revealed that she wore no makeup to get her Zellweger appearance. She simply donned long eyelashes, very much like Shari Lewis's Lambchop. "This is why I need therapy... I better watch what I say. Look at what happens when I've done nothing to her." She went on to say that Ullman looked like her "transvestite twin brother".

Political pundit Arianna Huffington's thick Greek accent and obsession with blogging receive numerous jabs throughout the series. The word "blog" is often substituted for various nouns and verbs. While filling out an internet dating profile, Ullman as Huffington types, "Must enjoy nice long blogs in the rain." She clutches her laptop in her arms and kisses it goodnight upon going to sleep. Huffington takes the parody in good humor, saying, "I actually loved it." Huffington continued, "She does a really good imitation of me... And you know... she ends a lot of her imitations of me by saying 'blogs and kisses,' which is kind of something pretty good. I like that.

Larry David, ex-husband of Laurie David (who is impersonated in the show), publicly confronted Ullman yelling that he didn't appreciate what she did to his wife and that she was upset. Ullman says it turned into an episode of Curb Your Enthusiasm. She later apologized personally to Laurie David.

In the end, Ullman contends that celebrities "love being impersonated".

=== Awards and nominations ===
Year	Award	Category	Recipient(s)/Nominee(s)	Result
2008	Online Film & Television Association	Best Host or Performer of a Variety, Musical, or Comedy Program	Tracey Ullman	Nominated
2008	Online Film & Television Association	Best Ensemble of a Variety, Musical, or Comedy Program		Nominated
2008	Primetime Emmy Awards	Outstanding Makeup For A Single-camera Series (non-prosthetic)	Sally Sutton (department head makeup artist), Matthew W. Mungle (additional make-up artist)	Won
2008	Primetime Emmy Awards	Outstanding Hairstyling For A Single-camera Series	Martin Samuel (department head hairstylist)	Nominated
2008	Primetime Emmy Awards	Outstanding Prosthetic Makeup For A Series, Miniseries, Movie Or A Special	Sally Sutton (department head makeup artist), Matthew W. Mungle (special prosthetics)	Nominated
2008	Satellite Awards	Best Comedy Series	Tracey Ullman's State of the Union	Won
2008	Satellite Awards	Best Performance in a Comedy Series	Tracey Ullman	Nominated
2009
2009	Art Director's Guild	Variety, Music or Nonfiction	Dan Butts	Won
2009	Online Film & Television Association	Best Host or Performer of a Variety, Musical, or Comedy Program	Tracey Ullman	Nominated
2009	Online Film & Television Association	Best Makeup/Hairstyling in a Series		Nominated
2009	Primetime Emmy Awards	Outstanding Prosthetic Makeup For A Series, Miniseries, Movie Or A Special	Matthew W. Mungle (prosthetic designer/special makeup effects department head), Sally Sutton (department head makeup artist). Kate Shorter (additional makeup artist)	Nominated
2009	Primetime Emmy Awards	Outstanding Hairstyling for a Single Camera Series	Martin Samuel department head hairstylist)	Nominated
2009	Screen Actors Guild Awards	Best Actress in a Comedy Series	Tracey Ullman	Nominated
2010	Online Film & Television Association	Best Female Performance in a Fiction Program	Tracey Ullman	Nominated
2010	Primetime Emmy Awards	Outstanding Hairstyling for a Single Camera Series	Martin Samuel (department head hairstylist), Colleen LaBaff (key hairstylist)	Nominated

== Adaptations ==
On November 6, 2008, it was announced that State of the Union would be remade for Germany starring comedian, writer, Mona Sharma, under the title Lage Der Nation.

== Home media ==
=== Region 0 ===
DVD name	Release date	Ep #	Additional information
Tracey Ullman's State of the Union: Complete Season One	November 11, 2008	5	This one-disc set contains all five episodes of Season 1 along with extras, which include: 30 minutes of bonus footage including a blooper reel, character makeup tests with Ullman commentary, a "making" of the opening sequence with Ullman commentary, and extra material and deleted scenes.
Tracey Ullman's State of the Union: Complete Season Two	May 4, 2010	7	This two-disc set with a running time of 201 minutes, contains all seven episodes, a 20-minute documentary, outtakes and deleted scenes, "How It Was Done", and four sing-alongs.
Tracey Ullman's State of the Union: Complete Season Three	August 20, 2011	7	This two-disc set is only available through Amazon.com. Each set is printed on demand through Amazon's CreateSpace service. The two discs comprise all seven episodes, plus 40 minutes worth of extras: The Making of State of the Union Season 3/Behind The Scenes with commentary from Tracey, outtakes, and A Twist on Outsourced Call Centers. The total running time is 117 minutes.

=== Region 2 ===
DVD name	Release date	Ep #	Source
Tracey Ullman's State of the Union: Complete Season One	2010	5	
Tracey Ullman's State of the Union: Complete Season Two	2010	7	

=== Region 4 ===
DVD name	Release date	Ep #	Additional information
Tracey Ullman's State of the Union: Complete Series One and Two	October 1, 2009	12	This two-disc box set includes all 12 episodes of Seasons 1 and 2. Season 1 contains the same extras as the Region 0 release. Season 2 contains a 20-minute documentary, outtakes and deleted scenes, and four sing-alongs.
