= Allan McKeown =

British television and stage producer (1946–2013)

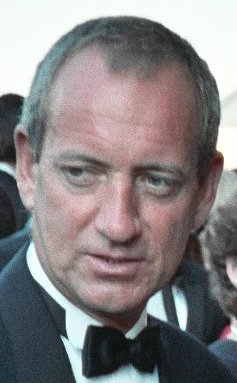
- McKeown at the 1990 Emmy Awards
- Born: John McKeown; 21 May 1946; Ealing, London, England
- Died: 24 December 2013 (aged 67); Los Angeles, California, U.S.
- Occupation: Producer
- Years active: 1979–2013
- Spouse: Tracey Ullman (m. 1983)
- Children: 2

Allan McKeown (born John McKeown; 21 May 1946 – 24 December 2013) was a British television, film, and stage producer.

== Early life ==
McKeown was born in Ealing, London, on 21 May 1946. His parents, Edith Mabel (née Humphries) and Albert Victor McKeown, moved first to Hackney and later to Hainault, Essex, where his father served as the Clerk of Works at a new estate. Educated at Beal Grammar School in Ilford, McKeown left early to become a trainee hairdresser at Vidal Sassoon on Bond Street. He became a notable figure in the London scene of the 1960s, and in 1966, he opened his own salon. As a hairdresser, he worked on the television programme Sunday Night at the London Palladium and the films if.... (1968), Villain, and Get Carter (both 1971).

== Career ==
=== Television producer ===
In 1969, he changed career paths and became a producer at James Garrett and Partners, which was the largest television commercial production company in the UK at the time. He was appointed managing director shortly after joining. He eventually left to form the production company WitzEnd with Dick Clement and Ian La Frenais. Initially focused on commercials, the company moved into feature film production with Porridge (released in the US as Doing Time, 1979). McKeown served as executive producer for Central Television's Auf Wiedersehen, Pet, with Clement and La Frenais as the show's main writers. He was one of the first independent television producers in the UK. McKeown not only produced content in Britain through WitzEnd, but also worked in the US for all the major networks. In 1986, WitzEnd acquired SelecTV, a company then primarily concerned with operating fledgling cable TV networks in the UK, and in the process became a public company. By 1988, SelecTV ceased its operations as a cable operator, disposing of all related assets. The company shifted its focus entirely to production, expanding by adding Alomo—a venture with writers Laurence Marks and Maurice Gran—to its stable of production companies. In 1990, McKeown was a founding member of the Meridian consortium, which was awarded the ITV television franchise for the South East of England. McKeown was responsible for all of Meridian's comedy programming. In 1994, SelecTV (by then a cable TV channel reusing the name of the former operator) launched its own programming, consisting mainly of shows produced by McKeown and selected offerings from Yorkshire TV. In March 1996, McKeown accepted £51 million for SelecTV—now a broadcaster and a major supplier of television programming—from Pearson, then owner of the Financial Times. McKeown returned to the US to produce the HBO comedy series Tracey Takes On... for his wife, Tracey Ullman. The series went on to win seven Primetime Emmy Awards. McKeown later invested in the media industry by launching the international distribution website itstv.com, which was sold in March 2000. In 2007, McKeown launched Allan McKeown Presents, Ltd., which produced the Indian comedy series Mumbai Calling and Tracey Ullman's State of the Union (2008–10).

=== Stage ===
McKeown was involved in the West End production of Anyone For Denis? (Whitehall Theatre, 1981) via WitzEnd Productions, and the Broadway production of The Big Love in 1991, a one-woman show starring Ullman. He also produced the highly successful Jerry Springer: The Opera, winning an Olivier Award for Best Musical. Additionally, he produced Lennon, a musical based on the life of John Lennon.

== Personal life ==
McKeown married actress Tracey Ullman in 1983. The couple had two children and maintained residences in both England and the United States. In 2006, McKeown and Ullman topped the "Wealthiest British Comedians" list, with an estimated combined net worth of £75 million.

== Death ==
McKeown died from prostate cancer in Los Angeles on 24 December 2013, at the age of 67.

== Filmography ==
=== Film ===
Year	Title	Notes
1979	Porridge	Producer

=== Television ===
Year	Title	Notes
1979	Doing Time	Producer
1979	To Russia... With Elton	Documentary short; producer
1980–1981	The Other 'Arf	TV series; executive producer
1981–1983	Astronauts	TV series; executive producer
1982	Dead Ernest	TV series; executive producer
1982	Shine on Harvey Moon	TV series; executive producer
1982	P.O.S.H	TV short; executive producer
1982	A Cut Above	TV pilot; executive producer
1983	Sunset Limousine	TV movie; producer
1983–1986	Auf Wiedersehen, Pet	TV series; executive producer
1985	Mog	TV series; executive producer
1985	Roll Over Beethoven	TV series; executive producer
1985–1986	Girls on Top	TV series; executive producer
1986–1994	Lovejoy	TV series; executive producer
1988	Jake's Journey	TV movie; producer
1989–1994	Birds of a Feather	TV series; executive producer
1990	Freddie and Max	TV series; executive producer
1991	So You Think You've Got Troubles	TV series; producer
1992	Love Hurts	TV series; executive producer
1992	The Old Boy Network	TV series; executive producer
1992	Stand by Your Man	TV series; executive producer
1993	Tracey Ullman: A Class Act	Executive producer
1993	Full Stretch	TV series; executive producer
1993	Westbeach	TV series; executive producer
1993	Over the Rainbow	TV series; executive producer
1993	Tracey Ullman Takes on New York	Executive producer
1993–1996	Goodnight Sweetheart	TV series; executive producer
1994	The New Statesman	TV series; executive producer
1994–1995	Men of the World	TV series; executive producer
1994–1996	Pie in the Sky	TV series; executive producer
1995	Sometime, Never	TV series; executive producer
1995	An Independent Man	TV series; executive producer
1996–1999	Tracey Takes On...	TV series; creator; executive producer
2001–2002	Tracey Ullman's Visible Panty Lines	TV series; executive producer
2003	Tracey Ullman in the Trailer Tales	Executive producer
2005	Jerry Springer: The Opera	Executive producer
2005	Tracey Ullman: Live and Exposed	Executive producer
2007–2008	Mumbai Calling	TV series; writer; executive producer
2008–2010	Tracey Ullman's State of the Union	TV series; executive producer

=== Theatre ===
Year	Title	Notes
1991	The Big Love	
2005	Jerry Springer: The Opera	
2005	Lennon	
