= List of Tracey Ullman's State of the Union episodes =

The following is an episode list for the Showtime original series Tracey Ullman's State of the Union, starring Tracey Ullman.

== Series overview ==
Season	Episodes	Originally released	
Season	Episodes	First released	Last released
1	5	March 30, 2008	April 27, 2008
2	7	April 12, 2009	May 24, 2009
3	7	January 25, 2010	March 8, 2010

=== Season 1 (2008) ===
No. overall	No. in season	Title	Directed by	Written by	Original release date
1	1	"The Wetwipe Killer"	Troy Miller	Tracey Ullman, Bruce Wagner, Gail Parent, Craig DiGregorio	March 30, 2008
Sindra wakes up for work. Marion checks in on her patient. Linda gives the morning news. Stacey Harris her farm. Laurie David talks to her publicist about Al Gore. Arianna Huffington discusses Rudy Giuliani's hair and takes a phone call to discuss her thoughts regarding the Zsa Zsa and Eva Gabor movie script. Nancy Pelosi gets Botox injections. Irma discusses restless leg syndrome with her neighbor. Padma gets held up. Tony Sirico is interviewed for his new film I Married This Inuit. Gretchen Pincus recounts her life story to a ghostwriter who's writing her autobiography. Rita Cosby reports from the lethal injection room where Gretchen Pincus' fiancé The Wetwipe Killer is scheduled to be executed. David Beckham talks to his agent. News reporter Campbell Brown gives the public its nightly terror report. Sally Knox has an affair with her boss. Dina Lohan learns of Lindsay Lohan's engagement in a club with other parents of young Hollywood celebrities. Sindra returns home.
2	2	"Bloggies"	Troy Miller	Tracey Ullman, Bruce Wagner, Gail Parent, Craig DiGregorio	April 6, 2008
A county hospital ambulance dumps a woman out onto the street. Linda wants to follow the "patient dumping" story and reads report on Angelina Jolie. Chanel does medical body scans. Laurie David discusses her eco-friendly private plane. Staff sergeant Lisa Penning returns home from Iraq to visit her son. Arianna chooses a dress for the Worldwide Blog Awards. Padma adds a Bollywood twist on erectile dysfunction. Renée Zellweger is on a press junket for her new movie Home Frontal Lobe. Irma talks about the "Super Bug". David Beckham's press conference. Campbell Brown's nightly terror news report. Arianna at Bloggies. Dina Lohan discusses Joy Fanning, mother of Dakota. Carmen gets interviewed by a news crew. Guest star: Dylan Sprayberry as Jesse
3	3	"Baby Shopping"	Troy Miller	Tracey Ullman, Bruce Wagner, Gail Parent, Craig DiGregorio	April 13, 2008
Mother Superior Rose Pannatella meditates. Linda reports on the alarm clock recall. Chandra talks yoga unions. Arianna's housekeeper gets stranded leaving Arianna to do the housework. Malawian star, Asmaa Qasim, comes to America to adopt a child. Laurie has her pilot dump jet fuel on Nebraska. Irma gets hit by Laurie's jet fuel. Padma sings about bipolar disorder medication. Sherilynn participates in the "Walk A Mile In Their Shoes" program dressed as a Muslim. Dame Judi Dench talks about her new film Who the Fuck Was I? Campbell Brown reports. Sandra rallies her team. Sally Knox and her boss discuss their lives. David Beckham gets ready for a dinner party with the creator of Lost. Dina Lohan is informed that her daughter is dead. Arianna blogs about her day. Dale and Asmaa head to Malawi.
4	4	"That Terrible Time of the Month"	Troy Miller	Tracey Ullman, Bruce Wagner, Gail Parent, Craig DiGregorio	April 20, 2008
America's imports/exports for the day. Mutiny" on a JetBlue plane. Chanel confiscates "pilot killers". Mary Ann LeFrank gets an ultrasound. Laurie David's publicist can't find the toilet. David Beckham returns from a child's birthday party. Andy Rooney delivers his piece on pencils. Cameron Diaz in That Terrible Time of the Month. Mary Ann's water breaks. Campbell Brown reports. Annette Thomas returns to the stage — almost. Ronnie Rooney dies during Chicago. Sally Knox and her boss decide to leave their spouses. Mary Ann gives birth. Arianna blogs about Andy Rooney and Mary Ann LeFrank. The fate of Mary Ann's offspring.
5	5	"Vagisizer"	Troy Miller	Tracey Ullman, Bruce Wager, Gail Parent, Craig DiGregorio	April 27, 2008
Rose questions God on being too politically correct. Marion arrives for work. Doris is questioned for drug smuggling. Sally learns that Chris has not left his wife. Russian translator. Rita Cosby arrives at the scene of crime. Abbey Melina Harris advertises for Dignity Village. Chanel reveals everything she's confiscated. Suzanne Somers plugs the Vagisizer. Dame Helen Mirren discusses her new film Fish Out Those Old Teats. Padma tries to help a customer remove her Vagisizer. David Beckham injures himself. Marion awaits the coroner.

=== Season 2 (2009) ===
No. overall	No. in season	Title	Directed by	Written by	Original release date
6	1	"Blogs and Kisses"	Troy Miller	Tracey Ullman & Bruce Wagner	April 12, 2009
Linda Alvarez discusses budgeting your money. Laura Bush wakes up in Crawford, Texas. Dee and Candy discuss passengers and Candy's fertility problem. Heather Mills' reality show. Chanel performs a scan on Candy. Padma explains the "American spirit" to Pudit. Arianna talks to President Barack Obama. Laura gets ready for the garage sale. Celine Dion returns to discuss the damage caused by Hurricane Katrina three years on to Larry King. Campbell Brown reports on objects missing from the White House. A woman gets stuck in a tiny car. Dee comforts Candy. Laura talks to George in bed.
7	2	"Hog Callin'"	Troy Miller	Tracey Ullman & Bruce Wagner	April 19, 2009
The FLDS wives say goodbye to their children who are being taken away by authorities. Rose is startled by the resemblance of her missionary to that of the FLDS. Linda reports on the polygamist compound as well as a polygamist family living in Buffalo, New York. Dee and Candy dispose and deal with ejaculate. Wendy Trenton wins a hog calling competition. Lunchtime at the compound. Renée Zellweger rehearses for the Broadway musical Seven Brides for Every Brother. Tony Sirico gets an audition for the musical. Donna Karen redesigns robes for members of the Supreme Court. Tony Sirico auditions. Campbell Brown reports the latest on the FLDS case. Miuccia Prada rolls out her polygamist-inspired fashion line. Arianna considers investing in the Seven Brides for Every Brother. Wendy is pulled over by a police officer. Laura Bush talks on the phone. Every child except one returns to the ranch.
8	3	"JK's Here, No Kidding"	Troy Miller	Tracey Ullman & Bruce Wagner	April 26, 2009
Linda announces the arrival of author J. K. Rowling who's coming to kick off her "American Litigation Tour". Lynne Garibaldi begs J. K. to intervene on her son's behalf. J. K. arrives in America. Chanel performs a "Harry Potter search" on a child. J. K. closes down a Harry Potter-inspired ride at a potato festival. Laura Bush returns home from her "fact-finding mission". Renée gets interviewed for her new film The World Is Not Magical, The World Is Absolute Shite, based on the life of J. K. Rowling. J. K. files a lawsuit against a preschool. Grammy Cyrus sings to Miley. Dina Lohan pitches a reality show. Campbell Brown reports on all the lawsuits filed by J. K. that day. Dina and Ali see Daniel Radcliffe in Equus. J. K. tries suing a homeless man. Dee highlights Candy's hair. J. K. flies home.
9	4	"Don't Dalai"	Troy Miller	Tracey Ullman, Bruce Wagner	May 3, 2009
Rose is proud that America elected its first African-American president. Linda gets attacked by a bee. Penny speaks to a client. Ingrid visits a doctor. Chanel reenacts the dance moves she did in rap music videos to a co-worker. The Dalai Lama holds a press conference. Padma sets up an appointment for Ingrid with her brother. Lynne converts. Tom Brokaw discusses retirement. Ingrid talks to her husband. The Dalai Lama performs on Dancing With The Stars. The game show So You Think You Can Die films. Linda checks out her clip on YouTube.
10	5	"Desperation with Dina"	Troy Miller	Tracey Ullman & Bruce Wager	May 10, 2009
Natural food workers put organic stickers on fruit. Linda reports on a wrecking crane accident. Ingrid returns from India. Candy deals with an overweight passenger. Sergeant Lisa Penning is back home with her son. Asmaa Qasim holds a press conference. Dina Lohan films her reality show. Lisa meets with a loan officer. An over-enthusiastic soccer mom. Tom Brokaw reports. A Cirque du Soleil performer prepares for a performance. Vanessa Pludd hits the slot machines. An accident occurs on Dancing With The Stars. Lisa sets fire to her house. Guest star: Dylan Sprayberry as Jesse
11	6	"Fuzzy Cheeks"	Troy Miller	Tracey Ullman & Bruce Wager	May 17, 2009
Rush hour for America's illegal immigrants crossing the Mexico–United States border. A mother tries to get her teenage daughter to breastfed her baby. A dog walker is attacked. Two lesbians prepare to tie the knot. A museum in Honolulu gets a painting donated to them by Jack Lord's daughter. Rachel Ludlow's mother flies in for the wedding. Padma receives a letter from her family in India. Gretchen signs copies of her book White Widow. Rachel learns that she's been dumped at the altar. Seth Rogen's press junket for his new movie Kink-Haired Ass Cheeks. Jonah Hill crashes Seth's interview. Rachel catches up with her girlfriend. A lounge singer performs a crazy dedication to her late singing partner. Illegal immigrants flee back across the border. A grandmother breastfeeds both her teenage daughter's baby and her teenage daughter.
12	7	"SpongeMom"	Troy Miller	Tracey Ullman & Bruce Wager	May 24, 2009
A man decides to commit suicide. Chanel celebrates President Obama. A pediatrician over-prescribes a child. A senior citizen, and former performer, prepares for a visit from her family. Lynne explains historical reenactment. An Olympic trainer likes them young. A wealthy woman talks to her therapist. Valerie Frumkiss is still waiting for her family. A teacher seduces a student. Jodie Foster talks about her new film SpongeMom Pantsuit. Robin Cavanaugh comforts her daughter. Valerie is still waiting for her family to visit. Robin's husband returns home.

=== Season 3 (2010) ===
No. overall	No. in season	Title	Directed by	Written by	Original release date
13	1	"Downsizing"	Tracey Ullman	Tracey Ullman & Bruce Wagner	January 25, 2010
Ruth Madoff has downsized. Bernie Madoff wakes up in prison. Chanel has a Michael Jackson dance off. Vicky agrees to be in a documentary about internet addiction. Carol shows off her denim company to a new worker. Romona gets stuck on the highway. Penélope Cruz discusses her new film. Vicky's family has an intervention. Campbell Brown reports on a book about Bernie Madoff. Inside the makeup room at The Rachel Maddow Show. Bernie Madoff is added to a Holocaust museum. Vicky's in a rehabilitation center.
14	2	"The Endless Walk"	Tracey Ullman	Tracey Ullman & Bruce Wagner	February 4, 2010
Patty Sue takes a call from an Indian customer. Linda Alvarez discusses Candy Spelling. Emily tries to get a job interview. Angela Suleman decides to go for a walk. An out of work soldier tries to find work. Candy Spelling interviews. Angela continues her walk. Padma Perkesh does a tribute to Slumdog Millionaire. Matthew McConaughey is interviewed about his new film. Campbell Brown reports. A Jewish internet dating agency date. Angela finds the eighth child.
15	3	"Putting Down the Boot"	Tracey Ullman	Tracey Ullman & Bruce Wagner	February 8, 2010
A woman drops off her son at a wilderness boot camp. Sonia Sotomayor shows off her locker. Polly checks the microphones. Chanel changes her body check procedures. A tennis instructor teaches moaning. Padma dances. A woman talks about her encounter with actor Sacha Baron Cohen. Jacqueline Lord talks about the Birther movement. Campbell Brown reports. Dee and Candy reminisce. Kurt has broken out of the wilderness boot camp.
16	4	"Get the Hose"	Tracey Ullman	Tracey Ullman & Bruce Wagner	February 15, 2010
A scientist clones Rupert Murdoch. Green collar workers. Dee and Candy spray down the passengers. Ramona's airbag deploys. Marion looks through Bernie Madoff's hate mail. Debbie Rowe discusses her children. A Graceland souvenir shop. A bookstore owner misses the scent of books. Antiques Roadshow. Marion helps Mrs. Katzman pack. Patty Sue takes a call.
17	5	"Cooking Incident"	Tracey Ullman	Tracey Ullman & Bruce Wager	February 22, 2010
Gretchen gets more supplies for her meth lab. Linda steps out for a smoke. Janice gets harassed for smoking. Tina Luffler is found after going missing since 1972. A rich woman hides her purchases due to the recession. Susan Boyle takes a meeting. Gretchen calls it a day. Carla Bruni visits Michelle Obama and writes her a song. Chanel is getting commended. Gretchen is helicoptered to a burn unit. Guest star: Dan Castellaneta as Agent
18	6	"Overcoming"	Tracey Ullman	Tracey Ullman & Bruce Wager	March 1, 2010
Whale volunteers. Linda talks about Jennifer Aniston. 9/11 press conference. An obese woman talks about laziness. Simona visits her brother Simon. Vocal coach. Chanel deals with an animal smuggler. Campbell Brown reports. Christiane reports. Kate Winslet is interview. Hudson moves.
19	7	"Locked and Loaded"	Tracey Ullman	Tracey Ullman & Bruce Wager	March 8, 2010
A couple refuses to vacate a rundown McMansion. Linda Alvarez reports on the Winter Olympics. Vendor, Vera Wilson, arrives at the gun fair. Caroline Kennedy visits her therapist. Zoey is still enjoying poverty. Vera's cash and carry is brisk. CSI wannabe. Caroline calls in a favor. Ingrid's children have moved back home. Antiques Roadshow. Campbell Brown reports. Chanel confiscates tweezers. Vera has a "Second Amendment" emergency.
