= Allan McKeown Presents =

British entertainment production company

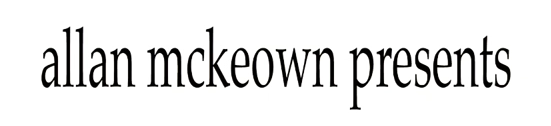
- Type: Production company
- Industry: Television, film, theatre
- Founded: 11 January 2007; 19 years ago
- Founder: Allan McKeown
- Defunct: 1 October 2026; 29 days ago
- Fate: Dissolved
- Headquarters: London, United Kingdom
- Key people: Tracey Ullman

Allan McKeown Presents Ltd was a television, film, and theatre production company that was created and founded in 2007 by British television and stage producer Allan McKeown, the late husband of actress Tracey Ullman. It produced projects for American, British, and Indian television.

Upon McKeown's death in 2013, Tracey Ullman took over as chairwoman of the company in his absence.

== Television ==
Television programmes by Allan McKeown Presents (listed by initial air date)
Year	Title	Air date	Number of series/seasons	Number of episodes	Notes	Network
2007, 2009	Mumbai Calling	30 May 2007, 30 May 2009 – 11 July 2009	1	7		ITV
2008–2010	Tracey Ullman's State of the Union	March 30, 2008 – March 8, 2010	3	19		Showtime
2016–2018	Tracey Ullman's Show	11 January 2016 – 2 November 2018	3	19	co-production with BBC and BBC Studios	BBC One
2017–2018	Tracey Breaks the News	27 October 2017 – 15 June 2018	2	7	co-production with BBC Studios	BBC One
