= Tracey Ullman discography =

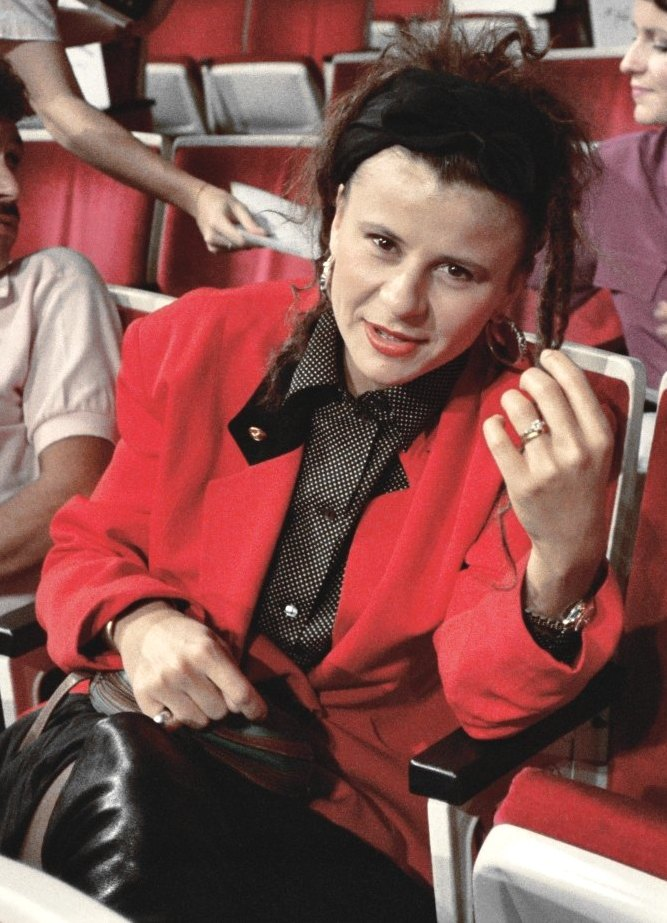
- Ullman in 1987
- Studio albums: 2
- Soundtrack albums: 2
- Compilation albums: 7
- Singles: 8
- Music videos: 9
- Comedy albums: 1
- Audiobooks: 3

This is the discography of British and American actress and singer Tracey Ullman. Known mainly for her work in television and film, she had a brief career as a successful pop singer. She was signed to Stiff Records in 1983 after label owner Dave Robinson heard some of the song parodies that she had done in the British sketch comedy television series Three of a Kind. Her albums consisted mainly of cover versions of songs from the 1950s through the early 1980s.

Her cover of the Kirsty MacColl song "They Don't Know" would go on to become her most successful single, reaching No. 2 in the UK, No. 8 in the United States, and No. 35 in Germany. In less than two years, she had seven singles in the UK Top 100, five of them top 30 hits. After the release of her second album, You Caught Me Out, in 1984, she decided to leave her music career behind and focus on acting.

== Albums ==
=== Studio albums ===
Title	Album details	Peak chart positions							Certifications
Title	Album details	UK	FIN	CAN	NL	NOR	SWE	US	Certifications
You Broke My Heart in 17 Places	Released: 25 November 1983; Label: Stiff; Formats: LP, cassette, CD	14	29	58	18	3	9	34	BPI: Silver
You Caught Me Out	Released: November 1984; Label: Stiff; Formats: LP, cassette, CD	92	13	—	—	11	13	—	
"—" denotes releases that did not chart or were not released in that territory.

=== Compilation albums ===
Title	Album details
Forever — The Best of Tracey Ullman	Released: 4 November 1985; Formats: LP, cassette, CD; Label: Stiff
The Best of Tracey Ullman: You Broke My Heart in 17 Places	Released: 12 May 1992; Formats: CD; Label: Rhino
Breakaway: The Very Best of...	Released: 1992; Formats: CD; Label: BR Music
The Very Best of Tracey Ullman	Released: 1993; Formats: CD; Label: Stiff
The Best of... Tracey Ullman	Released: 26 February 2002; Formats: CD; Label: Metro Music
Tracey Ullman Takes on the Hits	Released: 10 September 2002; Formats: CD; Label: Varese Vintage
Tracey Ullman — Move Over Darling: The Complete Stiff Recordings	Released: 14 September 2010; Formats: CD; Label: Salvo

=== Soundtrack albums ===
Title	Album details	Peak chart positions			
Title	Album details	ARIA	US	US Billboard Top Soundtracks	SNEP
Corpse Bride	Released: 20 September 2005; Formats: CD; Label: Warner Bros.	—	—	8	105
Into the Woods	Released: 16 December 2014; Formats: CD, digital download; Label: Walt Disney	13	8	2	—
"—" denotes releases that did not chart or were not released in that territory.

=== Comedy albums ===
Title	Album details
Three of a Kind (with Lenny Henry and David Copperfield)	Released: 1983; Formats: LP; Label: BBC Recordings

== Audiobooks ==
Title	Album details
Puss in Boots	Released: 1991; Formats: CD, cassette; Label: Rabbit Ears Entertainment
Wise Children	Released: 1 March 2018; Formats: CD, digital download; Label: Audible Studios
A Carnival of Snackeries: Diaries: Volume Two	Released: 5 October 2021; Formats: CD, digital download; Label: Hachette Audio

== Singles ==
Title	Year	Peak chart positions										Certifications	Album
Title	Year	UK	AUS	BE (FL)	CAN	GER	IRE	NL	NOR	NZ	US	Certifications	Album
"Breakaway"	1983	4	—	3	—	8	5	2	—	15	70	BPI: Silver	You Broke My Heart in 17 Places
"They Don't Know"	1983	2	56	6	5	35	1	10	1	—	8	BPI: Silver	You Broke My Heart in 17 Places
"Move Over Darling"	1983	8	—	15	—	—	5	20	—	—	—		You Broke My Heart in 17 Places
"Bobby's Girl" (Germany and US-only release)	1984	—	—	—	—	45	—	—	—	—	—		You Broke My Heart in 17 Places
"My Guy's Mad at Me"	1984	23	—	27	—	—	7	19	—	—	—		You Caught Me Out
"Sunglasses"	1984	18	—	25	—	52	18	29	—	—	—		You Caught Me Out
"Helpless"	1984	61	—	—	—	—	—	—	—	—	—		You Caught Me Out
"Terry"	1985	81	—	—	—	—	—	—	—	—	—		You Caught Me Out
"Shattered"	1985	—	—	—	—	—	—	—	—	—	—		Forever – The Best of Tracey Ullman
"—" denotes releases that did not chart or were not released in that territory.

== Music videos ==
Year	Single	Director
1983	"Breakaway"	Dave Robinson
1983	"They Don't Know"	Dave Robinson
1983	"Move Over Darling"	
1984	"My Guy"	
1984	"Sunglasses"	
1984	"Helpless"	
1985	"Terry"	
1991	"Monster in the Mirror" (Sesame Street)	Laura Di Trapani
2013	"Queenie Eye" (Paul McCartney)	Simon Aboud
2025	"Pressed Flower” (Frankie Cosmos)	Adam Kolodny
