= Full Stretch =

- Genre: Comedy
- Written by: Dick Clement; Ian La Frenais
- Directed by: Antonia Bird
- Starring: Kevin McNally; Reece Dinsdale
- Country of origin: United Kingdom
- Original language: English
- No. of series: 1
- No. of episodes: 6

Production
- Producers: Martin McKeand; Allan McKeown
- Running time: 60 minutes
- Production company: WitzEnd Productions

Original release
- Network: ITV
- Release: 5 January – 9 February 1993

Full Stretch is a British comedy television series which first aired on ITV in 1993. It portrays a limousine rental company owned by an ex-footballer.

David Bowie has a cameo as himself in one episode.

== Main cast ==
- Kevin McNally as Baz Levick (6 episodes)
- Reece Dinsdale as Tarquin Woods (6 episodes)
- Sue Johnston as Grace Robbins (6 episodes)
- Wendy Morgan as Tanya Levick (6 episodes)
- Rowena King as Tessa Knowles (6 episodes)
- David Howey as Norman Love (6 episodes)
- Tilly Vosburgh as Jools Legge (6 episodes)
- Clarence Smith as Darryl Judd (5 episodes)
- Dickon Tolson as Teejay (4 episodes)
- James Aubrey as Morris Legge (3 episodes)

== Bibliography ==
- Horace Newcomb. Encyclopedia of Television. Routledge, 2014.
