= Purple Skirt =

Online store

- Website type: Boutique, specialty store
- Founded: 1999
- Dissolved: 2006
- Headquarters: California, {{{location_country}}}
- Website: www.purpleskirt.com

Purple Skirt was a style and fashion-focused web site with an online boutique. It was the brainchild of actress Tracey Ullman. The site collected and sold clothing and accessories from both established and up-and-coming designers. It provided advice from stylists and costumes designers in the entertainment industry. Ullman wrote a monthly column. The web site was launched in November 1999 and was co-founded by Stephanie Laing and Jeannine Braden.

== Television series ==
In 2001, Ullman hosted a spin-off television talk show series for the Oxygen Network, Tracey Ullman's Visible Panty Lines. Like Purple Skirt, the show showcased fashion and style advice from industry experts, along with sit-down interviews with celebrities discussing their own personal style.
