= Mumbai Calling =

- Created by: Allan McKeown
- Directed by: Kabir Akhtar; Allan McKeown; Stojan Petrov
- Starring: Sanjeev Bhaskar; Nitin Ganatra; Daisy Beaumont
- Country of origin: India
- No. of series: 1
- No. of episodes: 7

Production
- Executive producer: Allan McKeown
- Running time: ~22 minutes
- Production company: Allan McKeown Presents

Original release
- Network: ITV; HBO Asia; ABC1
- Release: 30 May – 11 July 2009

Mumbai Calling is a British-Indian comedy series, starring Sanjeev Bhaskar, set in the fictional Teknobable call centre in Mumbai. The series was shot on location in India. The pilot first aired on ITV on 30 May 2007. The first series aired on ABC1 (Australia) starting on 12 May 2009, and on ITV starting on 30 May.

== Plot ==
Kenny Gupta (Bhaskar), a British Indian accountant, is sent to a call centre in Mumbai by his boss, Philip Glass. His job is to turn it around and make it profitable. Kenny is joined by Glass' daughter, Tiffany (Sophie Hunter), and local call centre manager Dev Raja (Ganatra).

After the pilot episode, Series 1 featured some major changes including replacing the character Tiffany Glass to Terri Johnson (Beaumont), and the call centre itself looked much more modern.

== Episodes ==
1. Teknobable
2. Home Comforts
3. Good Sellers
4. Boy to Man
5. Dating Season
6. My Mate Mumbai
7. All That Glitters is Not Glass

These seven new episodes were originally scheduled to be broadcast in a prime-time slot in ITV's 2008 Winter Schedule, however the channel changed its mind and put the episodes "on the shelf". As a result, the new episodes were first shown on HBO India in 2008 and were not broadcast in the UK until the end of May 2009.

== See also ==
- Outsourced, an American television sitcom with a similar premise.
