= David Copperfield (comedian) =

British comedian

David Copperfield (born as Stanley Barlow in 1947, Doncaster, West Riding of Yorkshire) is a British comedian who is best known for his role in the 1980s BBC sketch show Three of a Kind, in which he starred alongside Tracey Ullman and Lenny Henry.

== Career ==
Copperfield began his professional career performing in various cabaret venues. His first TV appearances were on the Wheeltappers and Shunters Social Club. His big break in TV earned him appearances on Wogan and Cliff and Friends. Three of a Kind ran from 1981 to 1983. After that, Copperfield worked on his own shows, Coppers & Co and Copperfield Comedy Company. He then worked on cruise liners as an entertainer under the name "David Copperfield – Not the Magician" (distinguishing himself from the American illusionist of the same name), including the QE2 on its final voyage to Dubai. In addition to comedy he sings, plays the violin, piano, guitar and mandolin and performs ventriloquism. He is particularly renowned for his acclaimed version of "Classical Gas".
