= Stephanie Laing =

American filmmaker

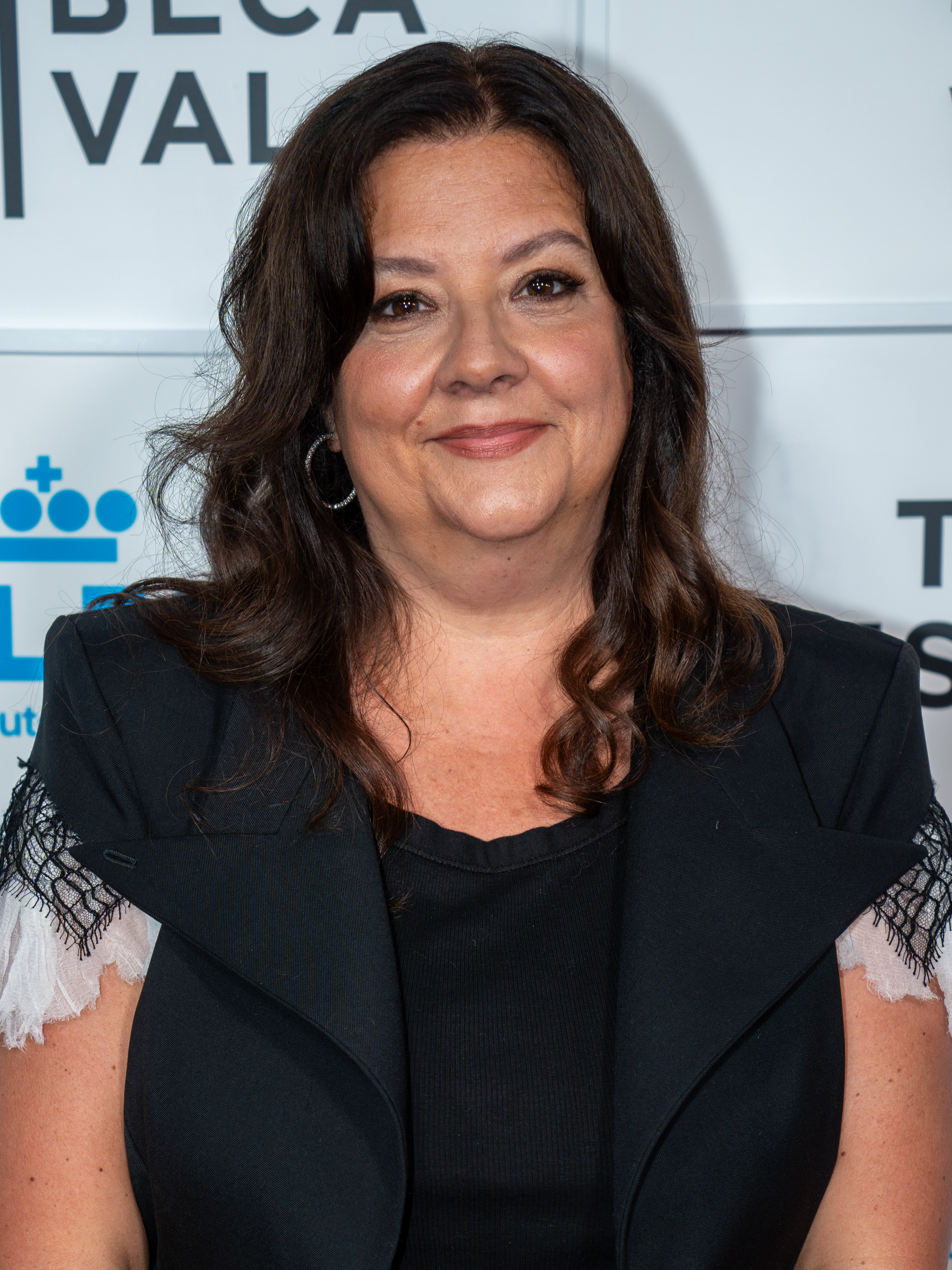
Stephanie Laing during the Tow premiere at the 2025 Tribeca Festival

Stephanie Laing is an American filmmaker known primarily for her work in television. She has worked on shows such as Tracey Takes On..., Tracey Ullman's Visible Panty Lines, Vice Principals, Divorce, Veep, and Eastbound & Down. She has also directed episodes of TV shows like I'm Sorry, Veep, Detroiters, Mixed-ish, Physical, and Interior Chinatown.

Her feature-length directorial debut, Irreplaceable You, was released worldwide by Netflix on February 16, 2018. Laing's second feature film, Family Squares, was released on February 25, 2022. Her third film, Tow, premiered at the Tribeca Festival on June 7, 2025, followed by a theatrical release date on March 20, 2026. Her next film is scheduled to be Runaway Wedding, written by Adam Brooks and produced for Working Title Films.
