= Three of a Kind (1981 TV series) =

British tv comedy sketch show series

- Starring: Lenny Henry; Tracey Ullman; David Copperfield
- Country of origin: United Kingdom
- Original language: English
- No. of series: 3
- No. of episodes: 17 (16 plus 1 special)

Production
- Running time: 30 minutes

Original release
- Network: BBC1
- Release: 1 July 1981 – 8 October 1983

Three of a Kind is a British comedy sketch show starring comedians Lenny Henry, Tracey Ullman and David Copperfield. Three series were made by the BBC between 1981 and 1983.

The show bolstered the careers of Ullman and Henry, as well as being an outlet for young writers including Rob Grant and Doug Naylor, Ian Hislop and Nick Revell. As was typical of British comedy sketch shows of the time, the show often featured musical guests, including The Style Council, Thin Lizzy, and Toyah (whom Ullman had previously lampooned on the show as "Annoyah").Copperfield was an accomplished classical guitarist and would play on the show.

Ullman and Henry went on to greater success after the show, with Ullman initially launching a brief but successful pop career in 1983 before appearing in the films Give My Regards to Broad Street and Plenty. She then co-starred in the ITV sitcom Girls on Top in 1985, before moving to the US and starting a career in American television in 1987. Henry was given his own BBC series The Lenny Henry Show in 1984, which ran in various iterations until 2005 (his comic character "Delbert Wilkins" originated on Three of a Kind and he carried the character over to his own show afterwards), and he has continued appearing on British television, or series produced in Britain (such as The Lord of the Rings: The Rings of Power in 2022). While Copperfield continued to appear on television, including his own series Lift Off! with Coppers & Co!, he has had more success as a stand-up comedian in the years since Three of a Kind.

== Commercial releases ==
=== Books ===
- A Three of a Kind book, featuring various sketches and stills from the series, was published by the BBC in 1983.

=== Video and DVD ===
A single video of the show, entitled Three of a Kind and released under the "Best of British Comedy" banner, appeared in 1988 from 20th Century Fox. It contained the four episodes of the first series edited together into one programme without the musical guest performances.

The same video was released earlier in the UK in 1984 by BBC Video and re-released in 1998 under Paradox Videos. In 2005 and 2006, DVDs of each series were released in the United Kingdom by 2Entertain (BBC Worldwide).

A laserdisc was released in 1985 by BBC Video (BBCL 7033) which had 85 minutes of content.

=== Records ===
- A Three of a Kind album, featuring sketches from the show, was released on BBC Records in 1983. It was released on CD and as a download in 2013.
- Tracey Ullman's 'Little Red Riding Hood' story-telling sketch from the series is sampled over an electro-boogie backing track on a Stiff Records 12-inch [BUY IT 217]. The record was pressed in 1984 and only exists as a white label test pressing. 'Little Red Riding Hood' was never released due to copyright issues. Some copies of this extremely rare 12-inch had "One of a Kind" stamped on the sleeve, a reference to both Tracey Ullman and the name of the show.

== See also ==
- A Kick Up the Eighties
