= Tracey Ullman =

British and American actress (born 1959)

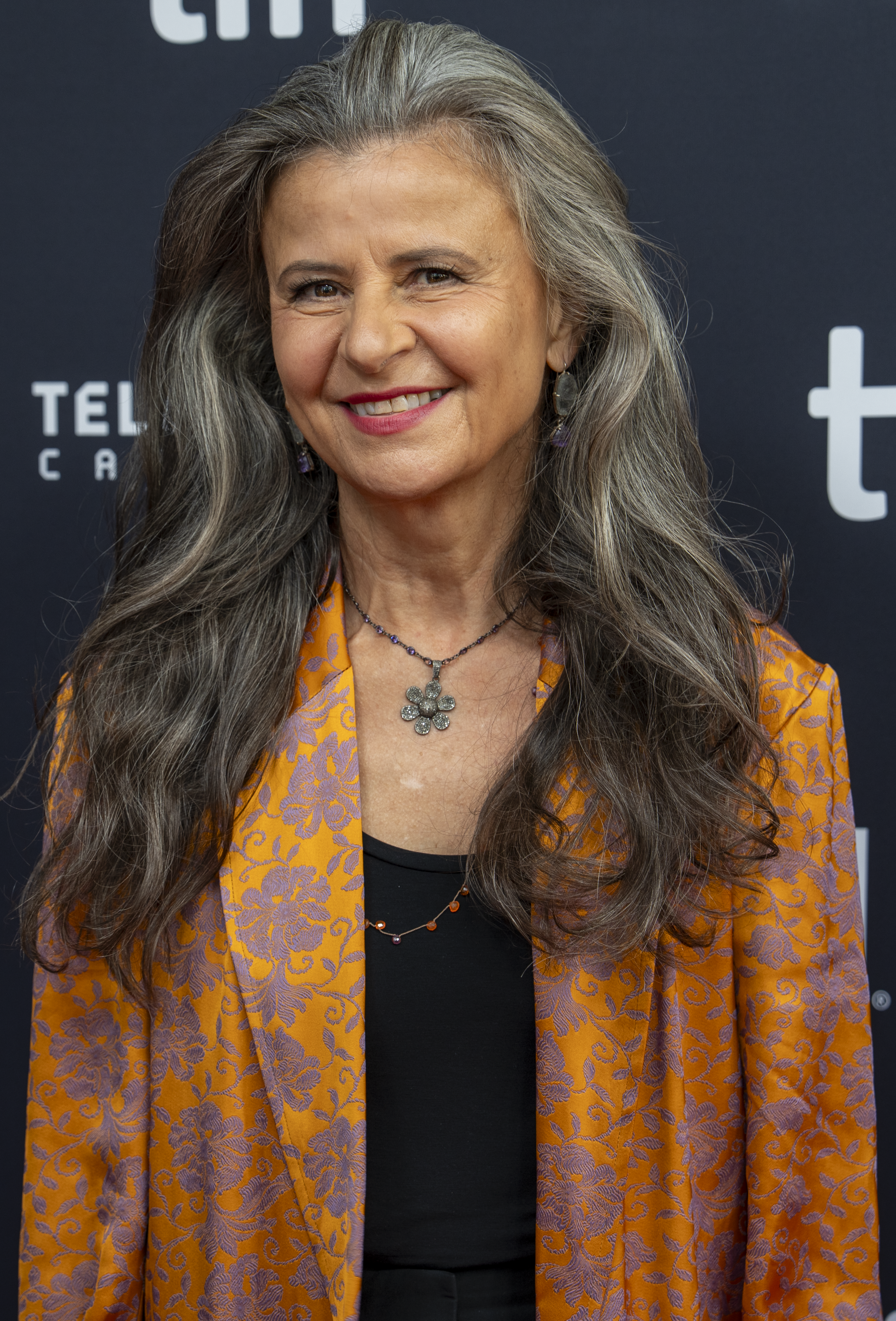
- Ullman at the 2025 Toronto International Film Festival
- Born: Trace Ullman; 30 December 1959 (age 66); Slough, Berkshire, England
- Citizenship: United Kingdom; United States
- Education: Italia Conti Academy of Theatre Arts
- Occupations: Actress; comedian; singer; dancer; screenwriter; producer; director; author
- Years active: 1976–present
- Works: Full list
- Spouse: Allan McKeown (m. 1983; died 2013)
- Children: 2
- Awards: Full list

Comedy career
- Medium: Television; film; theatre; books
- Genres: Sketch comedy; social commentary; satire; character comedy; parody; musical comedy
- Musical career
- Genres: Pop; rock; doo-wop; synth-pop
- Instrument: Vocals
- Works: Discography
- Years active: 1983–1985
- Label: Stiff
- Tracey Ullman's voice from the BBC Radio 4 programme Desert Island Discs, 1 October 2021

Tracey Ullman (born Trace Ullman; 30 December 1959) is a British and American actress, comedian, singer, dancer, screenwriter, producer, director, and author. Critics have lauded her ability to shift seamlessly between characters and accents, with many dubbing her the "female Peter Sellers".

Ullman began her career as a dramatic actress on stage, as well as in the British soap opera Mackenzie, playing Lisa Mackenzie. After an award-winning performance in the improvised play Four in a Million at the Royal Court Theatre, she branched out into comedy. She starred in the British television sketch comedies A Kick Up the Eighties (with Rik Mayall and Miriam Margolyes) and Three of a Kind (with Lenny Henry and David Copperfield), the latter winning her a BAFTA in 1984. After a brief singing career that garnered three top-ten singles, she appeared as Candice Valentine in the ITV sitcom Girls on Top alongside Dawn French, Jennifer Saunders, and Ruby Wax.

Ullman emigrated from the United Kingdom to the United States, where she starred in her own network television comedy series, The Tracey Ullman Show, from 1987 to 1990. The series famously featured the first appearances of the long-running animated media franchise The Simpsons. She later produced programmes for HBO, including Tracey Takes On... (1996–1999), garnering numerous awards and critical acclaim. She has appeared in several feature films, including Plenty (1985), which earned her a BAFTA Award for Best Supporting Actress nomination.

In 2016, she returned to British television with the BBC sketch comedy show Tracey Ullman's Show, her first project for the broadcaster in over 30 years. This led to the creation of the topical comedy series Tracey Breaks the News in 2017.

In 2017, Ullman was reportedly Britain's richest comedian and the second-richest British actress, with an estimated wealth of £80 million. She is the recipient of numerous accolades, including twelve American Comedy Awards, seven Primetime Emmy Awards, two British Academy Film Awards, four Satellite Awards, a Golden Globe Award, and an Actor Award.

== Early life ==
Tracey Ullman was born in Slough, Buckinghamshire (now Berkshire), the younger of two daughters, to Doreen (née Cleaver; 1929–2015), who came from a family of "Romany Gypsies who ran a travelling fairground", and Anthony John Ullman (1917–1966), a Roman Catholic Pole. Anthony served in the Polish Army and took part in the Battle of Dunkirk during World War II. After emigrating and marrying in England, he worked as a solicitor, a furniture salesman, and a travel agent. He also brokered marriages and translated among the émigré Polish community.

When Ullman was six, her father, who had been recovering from a heart operation, died in front of her. Her family, instead of telling her that he died, told her that he was "away on holiday". She was subsequently uprooted to Hackbridge, southwest London. Her mother struggled to make ends meet without their father's income. In an effort to cheer her family up, Ullman, along with her sister Patti, created and performed nightly shows on their mother's bedroom windowsill. After their mother remarried, the family moved frequently across the country, and Ullman attended numerous state schools where she wrote and performed in school plays.

She eventually caught the attention of a headmaster who recommended that she attend a performing arts school. She was awarded a full scholarship to the Italia Conti Academy at the age of twelve. At sixteen, she attended a dance audition under the impression that she was applying for a summer season in Scarborough. The audition resulted in a contract with a German ballet company for a revival of Gigi in Berlin. Upon returning to England, she joined the Second Generation dance troupe, performing in London, Blackpool, and Liverpool. She branched out into musical theatre and was cast in numerous West End musicals including Grease, Elvis The Musical, and The Rocky Horror Show.

== Television career ==
=== Early years ===
Ullman began her television career in 1980 playing Lynda Bellingham's daughter in the television series Mackenzie. "I really thought I was great when I did a quite serious soap opera for the BBC. I played a nice girl from St John's Wood. 'Mummy, I think I'm pregnant. I don't know who's done it.' Then I would fall down a hill or something. 'EEEEE! Oh, no, lost another baby.' It seemed all I ever did was have miscarriages—or make yogurt."

Ullman appeared in Les Blair's avant-garde Four in a Million, an improvised play about club acts, at London's Royal Court Theatre. She received the 1984 Critics' Circle Theatre Award for Most Promising New Actress for her performance.

In 1981, she was cast in the BBC Scotland sketch comedy programme A Kick Up the Eighties, which in turn led to her being offered the sketch show Three of a Kind, co-starring comedians Lenny Henry and David Copperfield. Ullman said, "My first reaction was 'you must be joking', as women are treated so shoddily in comedy. Big busty barmaids and all those sorts of clichés just bore me rigid." Eventually a deal was struck with the proviso that she would have script approval and could choose her own costumes. Three of a Kind premiered in July 1981, running for three series until 1983. Throughout the series, Ullman also sang, performing comical spoofs of well-known artists of the era such as Toyah, Bananarama, Jennifer Warnes, and Dollar. Three of a Kind led to a brief but successful singing career in 1983, as well as her winning her first BAFTA (for "Best Light Entertainment Performance") in 1984. By this time, she had become a household name with the British media referring to her as "Our Trace".

In 1985, she signed on to star in the ITV sitcom Girls on Top. She was cast as the promiscuous gold-digger Candice Valentine. The show, co-starring Dawn French, Ruby Wax, and Jennifer Saunders, continued for a second series without Ullman, who bowed out after the first.

=== The Tracey Ullman Show ===
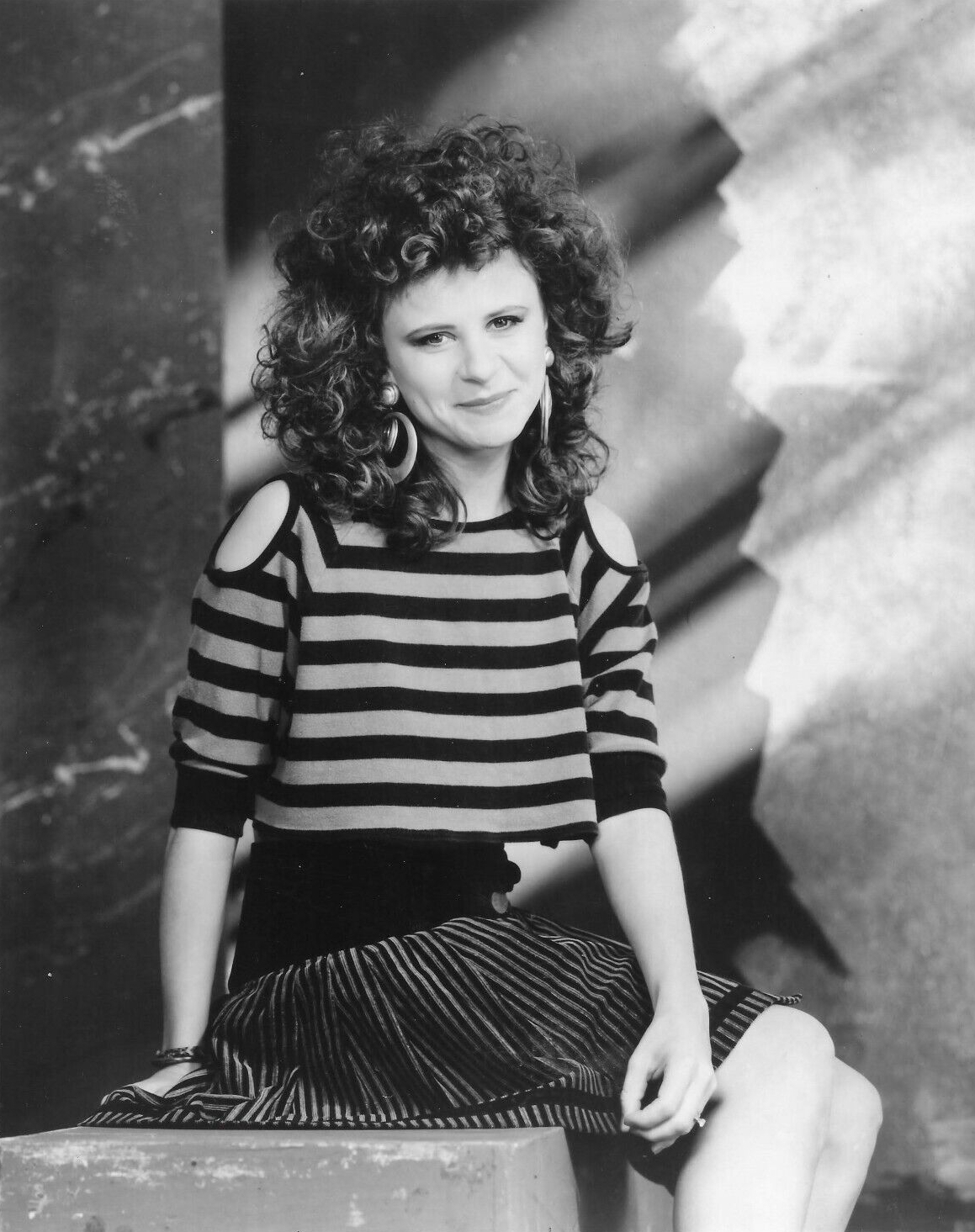
Ullman in 1987

In 1985, Ullman was persuaded by her husband, British independent television producer Allan McKeown, to join him in Los Angeles, where he was already partially based. She set her sights on a film and stage career, believing there was little in the way of television for her. Her British agent put together a videotape compilation of her work and began circulating it around Hollywood. The tape landed in the hands of Craig Kellem, vice president of comedy at Universal Television. A deal was immediately struck with CBS. I Love New York, a show about a "slightly wacky" British woman working in New York, was written by Saturday Night Live writer Anne Beatts. Unhappy with the direction the network wanted to take the show, Ullman's agent decided to contact producer James L. Brooks. Brooks felt that a sketch show would best suit her: "Why would you do something with Tracey playing a single character on TV when her talent requires variety? You can't categorize Tracey, so it's silly to come up with a show that attempted to." The Tracey Ullman Show debuted on 5 April 1987, along with Married... with Children. The show also produced The Simpsons as a series of animated shorts, or "bumpers", which aired before and after commercial breaks. The Simpsons shorts would eventually be spun off into their own half-hour series in 1989. The Tracey Ullman Show was awarded ten Primetime Emmy Awards, with Ullman winning three—one in the category of Outstanding Individual Performance in a Variety or Music Program in 1990. The show was the first Fox network primetime program to win an Emmy award. It concluded after a four-season run in 1990.

=== HBO ===
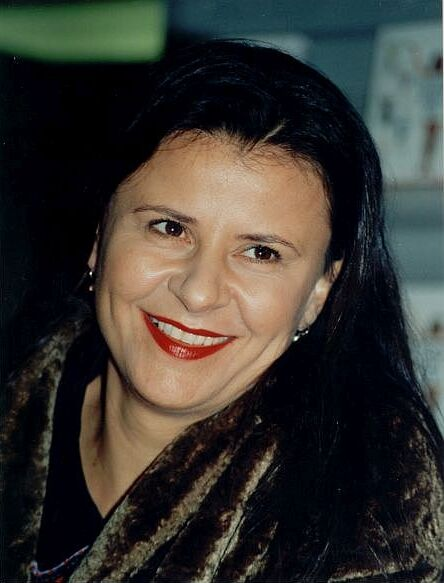
Ullman at a book signing in 1998

In 1991, Ullman's husband placed a successful bid on a television franchise in the South of England. The television programming lineup agreed upon included a Tracey Ullman special. Unlike the Fox show, this programme would be shot entirely on location. Tracey Ullman: A Class Act, a send-up of the British class system, premiered on 9 January 1993 on ITV. This led to HBO in America becoming interested in having a special made for them, with the caveat that Ullman take on a more American subject. She chose New York City. Tracey Ullman Takes on New York debuted on 9 October 1993. The programme went on to win two Emmy Awards, a CableAce Award, an American Comedy Award, and a Writers Guild of America Award. Its success led to the creation of the HBO sketch comedy series Tracey Takes On... in 1996.

Ullman returned to HBO in 2003 with the television special Tracey Ullman in the Trailer Tales, which she also directed. She returned to HBO again in 2005 with her one-woman stage show, Tracey Ullman: Live and Exposed.

=== Purple Skirt and Oxygen ===
In 2001, Ullman took a break from her multi-character work and created a fashion-themed talk show for the Oxygen Network, Tracey Ullman's Visible Panty Lines. The series was spun off from her e-commerce clothing store Purple Skirt. Interviewees included Arianna Huffington and Charlize Theron. The show ran for two seasons, concluding in 2002.

=== Showtime ===
Upon her naturalisation in the United States, it was announced in April 2007 that she would be making the switch from HBO to Showtime after working for fourteen years with the former. Tracey Ullman's State of the Union, a new sketch comedy series, debuted on 30 March 2008. It ran for three seasons, concluding in 2010.

=== Return to British television ===
In 2016, after an absence of over 30 years, Ullman returned to the BBC with the sketch comedy programme Tracey Ullman's Show. It aired in the United States on HBO. In 2017, the show earned a BAFTA nomination for Best Makeup and Hair Design, and its first Primetime Emmy Award nomination for Outstanding Variety Sketch Series. In 2018, it garnered two additional Primetime Emmy Award nominations in the categories of Outstanding Variety Sketch Series and Outstanding Costumes for a Variety, Nonfiction, or Reality Programming. The show eventually led to the creation of the topical comedy programme Tracey Breaks the News in 2017.

=== Other notable work ===
In 1995, she became the first modern-day cartoon voice of Little Lulu. In 1999, she had a recurring role as an unconventional psychotherapist on Ally McBeal. Her performance garnered her a Primetime Emmy Award, her seventh, and an American Comedy Award which was her eleventh. In 2005, she co-starred with Carol Burnett in the television adaptation of Once Upon a Mattress. She played Princess Winnifred, a role originally made famous by Burnett on Broadway. This time Burnett took on the role of the overbearing Queen Aggravain.

In March 2014, Ullman made her debut as Genevieve Scherbatsky, the mother of Robin Scherbatsky in How I Met Your Mother. On 15 February 2017, it was announced that she would star in the Starz/BBC co-produced limited series adaptation of Howards End, playing Aunt Juley Mund.

On 14 May 2019, it was announced that Ullman would portray Betty Friedan in the FX limited series Mrs. America. The nine-episode series premiered 15 April 2020 on Hulu to favourable reviews. Her performance garnered her an Outstanding Supporting Actress in a Limited Series or Movie Primetime Emmy nomination.

Ullman played Councilwoman Irma Kostroski in the eleventh and twelfth seasons of Curb Your Enthusiasm. In 2026, she joined the cast of the Apple TV television series Ted Lasso. In July 2026, it was announced that she would be joining the cast of Alien: Earth.

== Music career ==
"They Don't Know"
18-second sample with chorus

A chance encounter with the wife of the head of Stiff Records led to Ullman getting a recording contract in 1983. Label owner Dave Robinson was taken with some of the musical parodies she had been doing on television in Three of a Kind and signed her. Ullman recounted, "One day, I was at my hairdresser, and Dave Robinson's wife Rosemary leant over and said, 'Do you want to make a record?'... I went, 'Yeah I want to make a record.' I would have tried anything."

Within 18 months, Ullman had scored five top 30 hits on the UK Singles Chart. Her first two singles ("Breakaway" and "They Don't Know") were certified silver by the BPI, as was her debut album. Ullman's songs were over-the-top evocations of 1960s and 1970s pop music with a 1980s edge, "somewhere between Minnie Mouse and the Supremes" as Melody Maker put it.

Her 1983 debut album You Broke My Heart in 17 Places was a top 20 hit in the UK, and featured three UK top 10 hit singles. Her first hit single, "Breakaway", reached No. 4 in the UK. This was followed by the international hit version of Kirsty MacColl's "They Don't Know", which reached No. 2 in the UK, and No. 8 in the United States. The video for "They Don't Know" featured a cameo appearance from Paul McCartney (at the time, Ullman was filming a minor role in McCartney's film Give My Regards to Broad Street). A third single from the album, a recording of Doris Day's "Move Over Darling", reached No. 8 in the UK.

Ullman released her second and final studio album You Caught Me Out in 1984. This included her version of Madness's "My Girl", which she changed to "My Guy", which reached No. 23. Its accompanying video featured a cameo from the British Labour Party politician Neil Kinnock, at the time the Leader of the Opposition. Her final top 30 hit, "Sunglasses" (1984), peaked at No. 18 in the UK and featured comedian Adrian Edmondson in its music video. During this time she also appeared as a guest VJ on MTV in the United States.

== Film career ==
Along with her television work, Ullman has featured in many films throughout her career. Her first theatrical film appearance was a small role in Paul McCartney's film Give My Regards to Broad Street (1984). This was followed by a supporting role in the drama Plenty (1985) starring Meryl Streep. She made her big screen leading role debut in I Love You to Death (1990) acting alongside Kevin Kline, River Phoenix, and Joan Plowright. She appeared in lead and supporting roles in films such as Robin Hood: Men in Tights (1993), Nancy Savoca's Household Saints (1993), Bullets Over Broadway (1994), Small Time Crooks (2000), Panic (2000) and A Dirty Shame (2004). She was nominated for a Golden Globe Award in the category of Best Actress – Motion Picture Musical or Comedy for her work in Small Time Crooks in 2001. She played Jack's Mother in the 2014 film adaptation of the Broadway musical Into the Woods and appeared in the musical film The Prom (2020). She co-starred in the Tim Mielants-directed drama Steve (2025) based on the novella Shy by Max Porter. Her voice work in animated films include Corpse Bride, The Tale of Despereaux and Onward.

== Theatre ==
Ullman has an extensive stage career spanning back to the 1970s. In 1980, she appeared in Victoria Wood's Talent at the Everyman Theatre in Liverpool. In 1982, she played Kate Hardcastle in She Stoops to Conquer. In 1983, she took part in the workshop for Andrew Lloyd Webber's Starlight Express, playing the part of Pearl and she performed in Snoo Wilson's The Grass Widow at the Royal Court Theatre with Alan Rickman.

In 1990, she starred opposite actor Morgan Freeman as Kate in Shakespeare in the Park's production of Taming of the Shrew set in the Wild West for Joe Papp. In 1991, she performed on Broadway in Jay Presson Allen's one-woman show The Big Love, based on the book of the same name. Both Taming of the Shrew and The Big Love garnered her Theatre World Awards.

In 2011, she returned to the British stage in the Stephen Poliakoff drama My City. Her performance earned her an Evening Standard Theatre Awards nomination for Best Actress. In 2012, she joined the cast of Eric Idle's What About Dick?, described as a 1940s-style stand-up improv musical comedy radio play, taking on three roles. The show played for four nights in April in Los Angeles at the Orpheum Theatre. She had performed the piece previously in a test run for Idle back in 2007. Cast members included Idle, Eddie Izzard, Billy Connolly, Russell Brand, Tim Curry, Jane Leeves, Jim Piddock, and Sophie Winkleman. On 6 October 2014, it was formally announced that she would star in a limited engagement of The Band Wagon.

== Personal life ==
Ullman married producer Allan McKeown in 1983. The couple have two children. On 24 December 2013, McKeown died at home from prostate cancer.

Ullman's mother died in a fire at her flat on 23 March 2015. An inquest ruled the death to be accidental. She was 85 years old.

In September 2018, Ullman revealed that her daughter was pregnant and that she was about to become a grandmother.

Ullman acquired American citizenship in December 2006. She holds dual citizenship in the United Kingdom and the United States. In 2006, she topped the list for the "Wealthiest British Comedians", with an estimated wealth of £75 million. In 2017, The Sunday Times estimated her wealth to be £80 million.

An avid knitter, she co-wrote a knitting book, Knit 2 Together: Patterns and Stories for Serious Knitting Fun, in 2006.

== Discography ==
- You Broke My Heart in 17 Places (1983)
- You Caught Me Out (1984)

== Bibliography ==
- French, Dawn; Wax, Ruby; Saunders, Jennifer (1986). Girls on Top. HarperCollins Publishers. ISBN 0586068929.
- Ullman, Tracey (1998). Tracey Takes On. Hyperion. ISBN 978-0-7868-6340-2.
- Ullman, Tracey; Clark, Mel (2006). Knit 2 Together: Patterns and Stories for Serious Knitting Fun. Stewart, Tabori and Chang. ISBN 978-1584795346.
- Ullman, Tracey (2019). On Dogs: An Anthology. Notting Hill Editions. ISBN 978-1912559152.
