= Tracey Ullman's Visible Panty Lines =

American television series

- Presented by: Tracey Ullman
- Opening theme: "Girls Talk" (Season 1)
- Country of origin: United States
- Original language: English
- No. of seasons: 2
- No. of episodes: 22

Production
- Executive producers: Tracey Ullman; Allan McKeown; Ellen Lewis
- Producer: Stephanie Laing
- Camera setup: Single-camera
- Running time: 30 minutes
- Production company: Purpleskirt TV

Original release
- Network: Oxygen
- Release: September 20, 2001 – August 29, 2002

Tracey Ullman's Visible Panty Lines is an American talk show and reality television series hosted by Tracey Ullman. The show focuses on fashion and individual style. Each episode consists of makeovers and celebrity guests. Celebrities reveal what is in their wardrobes and present childhood mementos. The show was inspired by Ullman's online fashion boutique, Purple Skirt. The series was originally set to air on September 13, 2001, but due to the September 11 attacks, the show was bumped to September 20. On the morning of September 11, Ullman made a live appearance on NBC's Today to promote the show just hours before the attacks began.

== Background ==
After the conclusion of her HBO sketch comedy series, Tracey Takes On... (1996–1999), Tracey Ullman decided to take a step back from television, citing exhaustion from years of having to wear heavy prosthetic makeup for many of her television characters. In 1999, she signed on for Woody Allen's film Small Time Crooks as well as the film Panic. Despite making a conscious decision to move away from television, she announced her intentions to return. She hoped to create a new comedy series, one in which she would play a few characters with minimal makeup. In the meantime, Ullman busied herself with her online fashion-focused boutique and blog, Purple Skirt, which she had launched in 1999. In 2001, she decided to spin off the website into a fashion talk show and reality show for the Oxygen television network, co-founded by American talk show host Oprah Winfrey in 2001. Tracey Ullman's Visible Panty Lines, a show showcasing fashion and style advice from industry experts, along with sit-down interviews with celebrities discussing their own personal style, debuted in September 2001. The show ran for two seasons.

== Episodes ==
=== Season 1 (2001) ===
No. overall	No. in season	Guest(s)	Original release date
1	1	Cindy Crawford, Nell Campbell	September 20, 2001
2	2	Rhea Perlman	September 27, 2001
3	3	Nell Campbell, Dame Edna	October 11, 2001
4	4	Belinda Carlisle	October 18, 2001
5	5	Kathy Najimy	October 25, 2001
6	6	Gloria Allred	November 1, 2001
7	7	Mo Gaffney	November 8, 2001
8	8	Carol Kane	November 15, 2002
9	9	Jackie Collins, Nell Campbell	November 29, 2001
10	10	Allee Willis	December 9, 2001
11	11	Rita Wilson	December 16, 2001

=== Season 2 (2002) ===
No. overall	No. in season	Guest(s)	Original release date
12	1	Charlize Theron and her mother Gerda	June 13, 2002
Tracey works at a Korean spa for the day; Tracey discusses some of her favorite pairs of shoes.
13	2	Laila Ali	June 20, 2002
Tracey visits Laila Ali at her Las Vegas gym and receives some boxing lessons from her.
14	3	Madeline Meyerowitz	June 27, 2002
Tracey interviews the designer Koos, and she and vintage clothing specialist Madeline Meyerowitz put in some time at the Salvation Army store.
15	4	Rosanna Arquette	July 11, 2002
Tracey talks about aging, talks with Rosanna Arquette (who models some of her personal wardrobe) and tries on some clerical garb.
16	5	Arianna Huffington	July 18, 2002
Tracey talks about voices and notes the resemblance of Arianna Huffington's voice to Eva Gabor's; Tracey goes postal.
17	6	Rick Owens	July 25, 2002
Tracey compares LA fashion circa 1983 and today, visits the Hollywood studio of designer Rick Owens, and goes to work at the French cafe across the street.
18	7	Angie Dickinson	August 1, 2002
Tracey interviews Angie Dickinson and takes another trip to Las Vegas, this time to work at Caesar's Palace as a desk clerk and as Cleopatra.
19	8	Amy Alcott	August 8, 2002
We see golf fashion through the ages as Tracey joins Amy on the links.
20	9	Christina Applegate	August 15, 2002
Tracey puts in time at a pet washing service.
21	10	Helen Fielding	August 22, 2002
Tracey goes to preschool.
22	11	Julia Fordham	August 29, 2002
Julia sings a song, and Tracey does a stint at a 1940's gas station.
