= Tracey Ullman: Live and Exposed =

- Created by: Tracey Ullman; Allan McKeown
- Written by: Tracey Ullman
- Directed by: Linda Mendoza
- Starring: Tracey Ullman
- Opening theme: "They Don't Know"
- Ending theme: "They Don't Know"
- Composer: Richard Gibbs
- Country of origin: United States

Production
- Executive producers: Tracey Ullman; Allan McKeown
- Producer: Stephanie Laing
- Editor: Tammis Chandler
- Running time: 75 minutes

Original release
- Network: HBO
- Release: May 14, 2005

Tracey Ullman: Live and Exposed is an HBO comedy special starring Tracey Ullman. The stage show documents Ullman's rise to fame with reenactments of her childhood, as well as her career as a performer. Many of her television characters also appear, along with their origin stories. The characters are performed with no makeup and little costuming.

The special was filmed at The Fonda Theatre in Los Angeles, where it ran for ten performances. The show, which was being readied for a Broadway run, had the working title Tracey's Best Bits.

== Cast ==
- Tracey Ullman as Herself
- Scott Fowler as Dancer
- Vince Pesce as Dancer
- Anna Rustowitz as Dancer
- Anna A. White as Dancer
- Sandra K. Horner as Fan (uncredited)

== Reception ==
=== Awards and nominations ===
Year	Award	Category	Recipient(s)/Nominee(s)	Result
2005	Gold Derby Awards	Variety Performer	Tracey Ullman	Nominated
2005	Gold Derby Awards	Variety Series	Tracey Ullman: Live and Exposed	Nominated
2005	Online Film & Television Association	Best Variety, Musical, or Comedy Special	Tracey Ullman: Live and Exposed	Nominated
2005	Primetime Emmy Awards	Outstanding Picture Editing for a Special (Single or Multi-Camera)	Tammis Chandler (editor)	Nominated
2005	Primetime Emmy Awards	Outstanding Hairstyling for a Miniseries, Movie or a Special	Audrey Futterman-Stern (key hairstylist)	Nominated
2005	Primetime Emmy Awards	Outstanding Individual Performance in a Variety or Music Program	Tracey Ullman	Nominated

== Home media ==
The special was released on DVD by HBO Home Video on September 5, 2005, in the United States.
