= Girls on Top (British TV series) =

- Clockwise from left: Amanda Ripley (Dawn French), Candice Valentine (Tracey Ullman), Jennifer Marsh (Jennifer Saunders), Shelley DuPont (Ruby Wax), Lady Chloe Carlton (Joan Greenwood).
- Created by: Dawn French; Jennifer Saunders; Ruby Wax
- Written by: Dawn French; Jennifer Saunders; Ruby Wax
- Directed by: Paul Jackson (series 1); Ed Bye (series 2)
- Starring: Dawn French; Joan Greenwood; Jennifer Saunders; Tracey Ullman; Ruby Wax
- Composer: Difford and Tilbrook
- Country of origin: United Kingdom
- No. of series: 2
- No. of episodes: 13

Production
- Executive producer: Allan McKeown
- Producers: Paul Jackson; Trevor Walton (series 1)
- Running time: 30 minutes (including adverts)
- Production company: WitzEnd for Central

Original release
- Network: ITV
- Release: 23 October 1985 – 11 December 1986

Girls on Top is a British sitcom, broadcast on ITV in 1985 and 1986, and made by Allan McKeown's WitzEnd Productions for the ITV contractor Central Independent Television. It starred Dawn French, Jennifer Saunders, Ruby Wax and Tracey Ullman with Joan Greenwood. It was written by French, Saunders, and Wax, with additional material for two episodes ("Four-Play", "Ident: Candy Time"), written by Ullman.

The show focused on four female child-like flatmates and their landlady. It was a female version of The Young Ones, two series of which were made in 1982 and 1984. French and Saunders had both previously guest starred in The Young Ones twice and like most of its stars, they were members of The Comic Strip.

== Synopsis ==
The premise of Girls on Top is that a feminist journalist (French), who writes for Spare Cheek, is forced to share her Kensington apartment with three non-feminist women in order to pay her rent to a wealthy romantic novelist (Joan Greenwood) who lives in the flat below.

The first episode had a woman in her early 20s named Amanda struggling to find a flat, against Shelley, and managing to procure one (that she cannot afford) from Lady Carlton, in London SW3. The previous resident, Candice, convinces Amanda to let her stay temporarily as she has nowhere else to go. Then, Jennifer, Amanda's childhood Brownies friend, arrives unexpectedly. Eventually, Amanda allows the obnoxious American Shelley to move in, splitting the rent with her, as she is the only one who can afford it, thanks to her wealthy family.

Episodes often centred on Shelley ordering the others around because they relied on her to get the rent paid; early episodes often incorporated Candice's latest invented illness, or any other reason to not pay the rent.

== Cast and characters ==
- Amanda Ripley (Dawn French): A strait-laced feminist, socialist, and anarchist, and the central character around whom the series is based. In public assemblies she wears the militant M-1965 field jacket, but at home she wears a prêt-à-porter NAF NAF LE GRAND MECHANT LOOK jacket. Amanda is generally the most level-headed of the group, but tries to hide her fascination with men and the royal family to comedic effect, with her hiding copies of Playgirl magazine becoming a running gag in the second series, in the first series, Candice enters Amanda's bedroom and hears a buzzing. She works at a feminist magazine titled Spare Cheeks.
- Jennifer Marsh (Jennifer Saunders): A mousy and childlike woman who was Amanda's childhood Brownies friend and serves as the whipping post for everyone else. In the first series, she is implied to be intellectually disabled. In the second series, she seems more intelligent, even briefly working as a stockbroker, but no less naïve. Saunders described Jennifer Marsh as "basically a moronic version of myself when I was twelve." She later credited Wax and Ullman with teaching her "how to write funny" and "how to act funny", respectively.
- Shelley DuPont (Ruby Wax): A struggling actress and the stereotype of a gaudily dressed, rude, loud-mouthed American. The other women only tolerate her and let her live with them due to her hefty trust fund and her agreement to pay 75% of the rent.
- Candice Valentine (Tracey Ullman): A promiscuous, lazy, manipulative gold-digger. Ullman left after the first series, as a result, the character is written out in the first episode of the second series. By the time the first run of the first series was being transmitted, Ullman was already in talks about a solo project with American television networks.
- Lady Chloe Carlton (Joan Greenwood): An eccentric elderly romance novelist and the women's landlady. In the first series, she has a taxidermied dog named Josephine, with which she behaves as though it was still alive.

Guest and recurring stars included:

- Helen Atkinson-Wood as Jane, a worker in a leasing agency ("Four-Play")
- Mark Arden and Stephen Frost as dancers at a club ("C.O.D.")
- Suzanne Bertish, Angela Pleasence, and Harriet Walter as RSC actors ("Mr Yummie Brownie")
- The Beverley Sisters as themselves ("Bring Me More Flamingoes")
- Simon Brint and Rowland Rivron as Shelley's backing band ("Cancel Toast")
- Robbie Coltrane as Morris and Paul Brooke as Lawrence, two kidnappers ("C.O.D.")
- Harry Enfield as Dr. Banks, Candice's doctor ("Mr Fluffy Knows Too Much")
- Katherine Helmond as Goldie DuPont, Shelley's mother ("Mr Yummie Brownie")
- Hugh Laurie as Tom, Amanda's crush ("Big Snogs")
- Helen Lederer as Debbie, a worker in a leasing agency ("Four-Play"), and Felicity, one of Amanda's co-workers ("Big Snogs", "Bring Me More Flamingoes")
- Pauline Melville as Yvonne, Amanda's boss ("Skankin'", "Big Snogs", "Bring Me More Flamingoes")
- Geraldine McNulty as Tina, a friend of Candice's ("Staying Alive" and "Ident: Candy Time")
- Pauline Quirke as Jennifer's supervisor ("Who's Ya Uncle Shelley?")
- Alan Rickman as Dmitri, Candice's boyfriend ("Four-Play"), and the voice of RADA ("Cancel Toast")
- John Sessions as Rodney, a stockbroker ("Who's Ya Uncle Shelley?")
- Arthur Smith as a delivery man ("Lower the Donkey")
- Harriet Thorpe as Chris, another of Amanda's co-workers ("Cancel Toast", "Big Snogs")

Many of the guest stars were fellow members of the Royal Shakespeare Company enlisted by Wax. Wax wanted to write a guest part for Ian McKellen, but it never happened.

== Production ==
Early in 1982, French and Saunders met Ruby Wax, and the three began to work on an idea for a television show based around their stage personas. Needing a fourth lead, Lenny Henry suggested Tracey Ullman. ITV's midlands franchise holder, Central Independent Television, commissioned a pilot, under the title "Four F’s to Share", which was made over the summer of 1983. Central Independent Television commissioned thirteen episodes to go into production in April 1984. Production fell victim to industrial action, and in January 1985, went into production with a rewritten "Four F’s to Share" as "Four-Play". Ben Elton was the script editor.

Scripts were written in Ruby Wax's flat in Holland Park, by Dawn French, Jennifer Saunders and Ruby Wax.

In January 1985, location night scenes were filmed in Nottingham.

During the second series a tie-in paperback, written by the cast, was published by HarperCollins.

== Music ==
The theme tune, like the series' score, was written and performed by Glenn Tilbrook and Chris Difford of the band Squeeze. Originally, the opening theme was sung by the cast (minus Greenwood). Three episodes of series one added an introductory verse sung by Ullman over the end credits. From the second episode of the second series, the opening theme was instead sung by Tilbrook.

== Episodes ==
The transmission dates reflect those in the London ITV region. The first series aired on Wednesdays at 8:30pm, while the second series aired on Thursdays at 9pm.

Girls on Top, seen on ITV from 1985 to 1986, was never broadcast in the United States.

=== Series 1 (1985) ===
No. overall	No. in series	Title	Original release date
1	1	"Four-Play"	23 October 1985
Lady Carlton evicts Candice, incorrectly believing her to be a sex worker. Amanda takes the apartment, but is forced to split the rent with Shelley, while Jennifer and Candice end up as freeloaders. Guest stars: Helen Atkinson-Wood as Jane, a worker in a leasing agency; Helen Lederer as Debbie, a worker in a leasing agency; Alan Rickman as Dmitri, Candice's boyfriend
2	2	"Staying Alive"	30 October 1985
In an attempt to get on Shelley's good side and avoid being thrown out, Candice gets her in contact with a film director - but the film turns out to be a pornographic film. Guest stars: Geraldine McNulty as Tina, a friend of Candice's
3	3	"C.O.D."	6 November 1985
Tired of Jennifer always being around to interrupt her lovemaking, Candice gets her out to a dance club, where she's kidnapped. Guest stars: Mark Arden and Stephen Frost as dancers at a club; Robbie Coltrane as Morris and Paul Brooke as Lawrence, two kidnappers
4	4	"Cancel Toast"	13 November 1985
Shelley auditions for RADA, but rather than performing a Shakespearean speech (with Jennifer's assistance), they want her to improv as a fried egg. Guest stars: Simon Brint and Rowland Rivron as Shelley's backing band; Alan Rickman as the voice of RADA; Harriet Thorpe as Chris, another of Amanda's co-workers
5	5	"Ident: Candy Time"	20 November 1985
The girls follow Candice, concerned she could be a prostitute. Candice, in turn, tries to convince them that she is dating Prince Andrew. Guest stars: Geraldine McNulty as Tina, a friend of Candice's
6	6	"Skankin'"	27 November 1985
Amanda, determined to "help in the community", discovers two Black British people and promotes them as a reggae band for the magazine's street festival. Guest stars: Pauline Melville as Yvonne, Amanda's boss
7	7	"Hark"	4 December 1985
Lady Carlton's taxidermied dog, Josephine, is stolen when Jennifer takes her for a walk. As a result, the girls plot to convince Lady Carlton that Josephine has ascended to Heaven. Note: This was the final on-screen appearance of Tracey Ullman as Candice Valentine.

=== Series 2 (1986) ===
No. overall	No. in series	Title	Original release date
8	1	"Mr Fluffy Knows Too Much"	30 October 1986
Candice leaves the others a note saying that she's in hospital; upon discovering that she's died, the three fear she was killed by one of their pranks and try to cover up the "murder". Guest star: Harry Enfield as Dr. Banks, Candice's doctor Note: This was the final voice appearance of Tracey Ullman as Candice Valentine.
9	2	"Big Snogs"	6 November 1986
Amanda falls head over heels in love with Tom, an electrician who gives a presentation for the Spare Cheeks staff in his sister's absence. Guest stars: Hugh Laurie as Tom, Amanda's crush; Pauline Melville as Yvonne, Amanda's boss; Helen Lederer as Felicity, one of Amanda's co-workers; Harriet Thorpe as Chris, another of Amanda's co-workers
10	3	"Who's Ya Uncle Shelley?"	20 November 1986
Jennifer takes a cleaning job at a stock exchange firm to pay for Amanda's office supplies, and is discovered to have a hidden talent for trading. Guest stars: Pauline Quirke as Jennifer's supervisor; John Sessions as Rodney, a stockbroker; Note: Joan Greenwood does not appear as Lady Carlton.
11	4	"Bring Me More Flamingoes"	27 November 1986
Shelley kicks Amanda and Jennifer out of the flat during her menstruation-influenced redecoration craze, then plans a party to become best friends with a range of British celebrities. Guest stars: Pauline Melville as Yvonne, Amanda's boss; Helen Lederer as Felicity, one of Amanda's co-workers; The Beverley Sisters as themselves
12	5	"Mr Yummie Brownie"	4 December 1986
Shelley's mother arrives in England to learn Shelley is not playing Ophelia at the London Palladium, but a singing tadpole in a play for schoolchildren. Meanwhile, Amanda enlists Jennifer and Lady Carlton's help in preparing a presentation on "understanding your own toilet parts". Guest stars: Katherine Helmond as Goldie DuPont, Shelley's mother; Suzanne Bertish, Angela Pleasence, and Harriet Walter as RSC actors
13	6	"Lower the Donkey"	11 December 1986
Amanda builds a nuclear fallout shelter in the apartment, while Lady Carlton misunderstands how to use the new appliances in her newly remodeled kitchen. Guest stars: Arthur Smith as a delivery man

== Reception ==
The production encountered push-back over words in their script, including "plucking the bikini line" and menstruation, rarely heard on pre-watershed TV in the 1980s.

We weren’t being shocking, that’s just the way we speak...We weren’t trying to break any walls down, that’s just who we were. - Ruby Wax

== Home media ==
Country	Title	Release date	Label	Contents	DVD format
United States	Girls on Top: Set One or Girls on Top: Four-Play	2003	BFS Entertainment	Four-Play; Staying Alive; Ident: Candy Time; Hark; Who's Ya Uncle Shelley?; Lower the Donkey; C.O.D.	NTSC
United States	Girls on Top: Set Two or Girls on Top: Big Snogs	2003	BFS Entertainment	Cancel Toast; Skankin'; Mr Fluffy Knows Too Much; Big Snogs; Bring Me More Flamingoes; Mr Yummie Brownie	NTSC
United Kingdom	Girls on Top – The Complete Series	2007	Network	All episodes; Special features: 1984 Tracey Ullman interview, 1988 Ruby Wax interview	Region 2 (PAL)
Australia	Girls on Top: Complete Series 1 and 2	2007	Time Life	All episodes	Region free (PAL)
