= The Big Love =

Account of an alleged love affair of Errol Flynn

- Author: Tedd Thomey, Florence Aadland (as told by)
- Language: English
- Subject: Biography
- Publisher: Lancer Books/Warner Books Edition (1986)/Spurl Editions (2018)
- Publication date: 1961
- Publication place: United States
- Media type: Print (Paperback)
- Pages: 192 pp
- ISBN: 0-446-30159-0
- OCLC: 14409362

The Big Love is a non-fiction scandalous biographical account of an alleged love affair between actor Errol Flynn and then fifteen-year-old actress Beverly Aadland, as told by her mother, Florence Aadland.

The original 1961 edition was first published by Lancer Books. A Warner Books Edition was released in 1986. This edition contained an epilogue by co-author Tedd Thomey, commenting on Florence Aadland's life and death, and her imprisonment. The Big Love was republished, along with supplemental materials, in 2018 by Spurl Editions.

The book was reviewed by William Styron, a reprint of which appears in This Quiet Dust, and Other Writings.

== Stage adaptation ==
In 1991, actress Tracey Ullman played Florence in a one-woman show by Brooke Allen, directed by Jay Presson Allen, based on the book.
