= Numbers season 6 =

Numbers
- Season 6
- DVD cover
- No. of episodes: 16

Release
- Original network: CBS
- Original release: September 25, 2009 – March 12, 2010

Season chronology
- ← Previous; Season 5

The sixth season of Numbers, an American television series, first aired on September 25, 2009 and ended on March 12, 2010, on CBS. This season featured 16 episodes.

On May 18, 2010, CBS canceled the series.

== Cast ==
- Rob Morrow as Don Eppes
- David Krumholtz as Charlie Eppes
- Judd Hirsch as Alan Eppes
- Alimi Ballard as David Sinclair
- Peter MacNicol as Larry Fleinhardt
- Navi Rawat as Amita Ramanujan
- Dylan Bruno as Colby Granger
- Aya Sumika as Liz Warner
- Sophina Brown as Nikki Betancourt

== Episodes ==
No. overall	No. in season	Title	Directed by	Written by	Original release date	Prod. code	US viewers (millions)
103	1	"Hangman"	Ken Sanzel	Ken Sanzel	September 25, 2009	601	8.10
While Charlie waits for an answer to the question he popped to Amita, Don and his team try to hunt down a sniper (Gary Cole) intent on killing an activist (David Call) under FBI protection. Mathematics used: Unexpected hanging paradox and Barberpole illusion
104	2	"Friendly Fire"	Rod Holcomb	Mark Llewellyn & Robert David Port	October 2, 2009	602	7.85
Two members of a unit led by Don's former mentor (Gregg Henry) are killed during a shootout with bank robbers. The bank robbers refuse to take responsibility for the killings and Charlie recreates the shootout to find out how they died, while Don must face up to the fact that his former mentor may be dirty. Lakers basketball player Jordan Farmar returns in another cameo performance. Mathematics used: Triangulation
105	3	"7 Men Out"	Alex Zakrzewski	Don McGill	October 9, 2009	603	7.34
To find the person behind a deadly gambling ring that is running a high-stakes Russian roulette tournament, Don and his team are called in to investigate. Elsewhere, Don and Charlie become concerned over Alan's financial health. Sarah Rafferty, Tim Guinee and Jason Antoon guest star. Mathematics used: IP traceback
106	4	"Where Credit's Due"	Dennis Smith	Andy Dettmann	October 16, 2009	604	7.77
The team investigates several deaths that turn out to be copies of a soon-to-be-released movie, while Larry goes on his own personal adventure. Alan continues his job search. Adam Goldberg, Jessica Lundy and Tyler Francavilla guest star. Mathematics used: Triangulation
107	5	"Hydra"	Ralph Hemecker	Sean Crouch	October 23, 2009	605	8.05
The team attempts to find the daughter (Emily Skinner) of a geneticist (Christian Camargo) whom they suspect was kidnapped by the unstable mother. However, they become concerned about the case when they find evidence that suggests the young girl was a clone. Meanwhile, Charlie and Amita discuss having kids and Liz reveals a dark secret. Keith David, Tony Hale and Mia Barron also guest star. Mathematics used: Wavelets, Acoustics and Cake cutting
108	6	"Dreamland"	Stephen Gyllenhaal	Nicolas Falacci & Cheryl Heuton	October 30, 2009	606	7.74
A woman's corpse turns up at a decommissioned air base. John Michael Higgins and John Cariani guest star. Mathematics used: Electric Fields for Three Point Charges, Cyclotrons and Gaussian Laser Modes
109	7	"Shadow Markets"	Julie Hébert	Julie Hébert	November 6, 2009	607	8.09
In order to find a cyber crime lord, the team conducts an undercover sting. The operation is prevented by a brilliant hacker (Josh Cooke) whose goal is to take over the Internet black market. However, his actions put him in a dangerous online war that might lead to murder. Pablo Schreiber, Wendy Makkena and Caroline Lagerfelt also guest star.
110	8	"Ultimatum"	Dennis Smith	Robert David Port	November 13, 2009	608	8.16
In the middle of a case where he is tracking down a criminal in charge of a heroin ring inside a prison, Agent Ian Edgerton (Lou Diamond Phillips, in a recurring role) unexpectedly turns into the murder suspect when the informant he meets with winds up dead, sending Edgerton over the edge when he takes a member of Don's team hostage. Christopher McDonald and Missi Pyle guest star. Mathematics used: Pursuit-evasion, Game theory and Ultimatum game
111	9	"Con Job"	Ralph Hemecker	Don McGill	November 20, 2009	609	7.84
When robbers hit a diamond exchange and take hostages, Don and the team find an unlikely ally in convict John Buckley (Fisher Stevens), who may help the team's investigation when they believe the men are copying Buckley's criminal strategies. Jon David Casey and Ellen Hollman guest star. Mathematics used: Packet injection, Man-in-the-middle attack and Combinatorial game theory (on hare games)
112	10	"Old Soldiers"	Ken Sanzel	Steve Cohen	December 4, 2009	610	7.38
Agent Roger Bloom (Henry Winkler), who worked on the Cooper case, is brought in to help the team when they foil a robbery of an armored car full of Federal Reserve money and recover bills that trace back to the infamous D.B. Cooper heist. Michael Hogan and Rick Ravanello also guest star. Mathematics used: Probabilistic risk assessment
113	11	"Scratch"	Stephen Gyllenhaal	Mary Leah Sutton	January 8, 2010	611	9.32
The team investigates the theft of scratch-off lottery tickets, but the stakes are raised when one of the culprits killed at a botched robbery turns out to be a former lottery winner. Guest stars include Michael O'Neill, Nicole Sullivan and Allison Smith.
114	12	"Arm in Arms"	Gwyneth Horder-Payton	Andy Dettmann	January 15, 2010	612	9.65
The team searches for a lost shipment of high-caliber firearms when one of the weapons is responsible for random killings throughout the city. Also, Charlie and Amita disagree on a wedding date while Don re-evaluates his relationship with Robin (Michelle Nolden). James Remar, Jon Seda and John Cariani guest star. Mathematics used: Reverse trajectory, 4D mapping, Combinatorial optimization and Pigeonhole principle
115	13	"Devil Girl"	Stephen Gyllenhaal	Julie Hébert	January 29, 2010	613	8.70
The team searches for a serial killer who is targeting men that solicit prostitutes. Also, Colby and Nikki deal with the aftermath of a car crash when they have an accident during the investigation. Tony Hale, Clea DuVall and Jeff Roop guest star. Mathematics used: Geo-profiling and Scaled gradient projection
116	14	"And the Winner Is…"	Ralph Hemecker	Gary Rieck	February 5, 2010	614	9.18
The team gets a taste of the limelight when they search for jewels worth millions that have been stolen during an awards show broadcast. In addition, Don revisits an old case that is haunting him, and Larry (Peter MacNicol) returns from his adventure in the desert. Guest stars include Marilu Henner, William Katt, Rowena King, Rick Hoffman and Stephen Spinella. Mathematics used: Retrograde analysis and Crowd flux dynamics
117	15	"Growin' Up"	Rob Morrow	Robert Port	March 5, 2010	615	8.10
The team investigates the deaths of two men who were part of a group of friends that had been sexually assaulted by a teacher when they were young boys. Jon Bernthal, Moira Kelly, Alan Ruck and Wendy Makkena are among the guest stars.
118	16	"Cause and Effect"	Nicolas Falacci	Nicolas Falacci & Cheryl Heuton	March 12, 2010	616	8.74
The team try to find Don's stolen gun, which is being used in a series of vigilante killings. Meanwhile, Charlie and Amita get married and Don decides on the direction he wants to take in life. Vyto Ruginis guest stars; Michelle Nolden, Lou Diamond Phillips, John Cariani and Matthew Yang King make final appearances in their recurring roles.
