= Numbers season 1 =

Numbers
- Season 1
- DVD cover
- No. of episodes: 13

Release
- Original network: CBS
- Original release: January 23 – May 13, 2005

Season chronology
- Next → Season 2

The first season of Numbers, an American television series, premiered on January 23, 2005, and finished on May 13, 2005. The first season sees the start of the working relationship between Don Eppes, an FBI agent, and his genius brother Charlie, an applied mathematician and professor at a local university. The rest of Don's FBI team consists of Terry Lake and David Sinclair. Don and Charlie's father, Alan Eppes, provides emotional support for the pair, while the brilliant Professor Larry Fleinhardt and promising doctoral student Amita Ramanujan provide mathematical support and insights to Charlie.

== Cast ==
=== Main ===
- Rob Morrow as Don Eppes
- David Krumholtz as Charlie Eppes
- Judd Hirsch as Alan Eppes
- Alimi Ballard as David Sinclair
- Sabrina Lloyd as Terry Lake
- Peter MacNicol as Larry Fleinhardt

=== Recurring ===
- Navi Rawat as Amita Ramanujan
- Lou Diamond Phillips as Ian Edgerton

=== Guest ===
- CCH Pounder as Lt. Havercamp
- J. K. Simmons as Dr. Clarence Weaver
- Alyson Reed as Eva Salton
- Neil Patrick Harris as Ethan Burdick
- Susan Egan as Becky Burdick
- Sarah Wayne Callies as Agent Kim Hall
- Molly Hagan as Fingerprint Technician
- Carrie Preston as Vicky Sites
- Joseph Gordon-Levitt as Scott Reynolds
- Stacy Edwards as Gail Hoke
- Gloria Reuben as Erica Quimby
- Jennifer Westfeldt as Dr. Karen Fisher
- Rainn Wilson as Martin Grolsch

== Episodes ==
No. overall	No. in season	Title	Directed by	Written by	Original release date	Prod. code	US viewers (millions)
1	1	"Pilot"	Mick Jackson	Nicolas Falacci & Cheryl Heuton	January 23, 2005	101	24.92
Charlie assists Don on a serial rapist case by calculating a "hot zone", an area where the rapist is most likely to live. Don is removed from the case after Charlie's formula fails to turn up any leads but later a comment from their father then leads Charlie to change the equation to calculate two points of origin, instead of one, leading to a new suspect. Anthony Heald guest stars. Mathematics used: Geographic profiling, probability theory, 11-dimensional supergravity theory and projectile motion
2	2	"Uncertainty Principle"	Davis Guggenheim	Nicolas Falacci & Cheryl Heuton	January 28, 2005	104	15.46
Charlie successfully predicts the time and place of a bank robbery using what he says are elements of Heisenberg's uncertainty principle, but when the planned arrest goes bad, he retreats into the math problem P vs. NP. Mathematics used: P vs. NP and Heisenberg's uncertainty principle
3	3	"Vector"	David Von Ancken	Jeff Vlaming	February 4, 2005	103	11.55
A deadly strain of influenza is spreading through Los Angeles, killing many people. Don investigates whether the strain was released deliberately, and Charlie tries to calculate the origin and likely spread of the virus. Guest stars include CCH Pounder, J.K. Simmons, and Rainn Wilson. Mathematics used: Patient Zero, Viral vector, Vector and SIR model
4	4	"Structural Corruption"	Tim Matheson	Liz Friedman	February 11, 2005	105	10.68
An engineering student dies by what is ruled a suicide, but Charlie suspects foul play. Don disagrees, but he agrees to help Charlie investigate whether the student was murdered because of his research into a building's structural integrity. Alyson Reed, Douglas Sills, and David Hunt guest star. The Hyatt Regency walkway collapsed in 1981 as did the Hartford Civic Center in 1978. The episode concludes with Don Eppes saying that Occam's razor says "that the simplest answer is usually the right one." Mathematics used: Pendulum and Foucault pendulum
5	5	"Prime Suspect"	Lesli Linka Glatter	Doris Egan	February 18, 2005	106	10.49
A young girl is kidnapped, but her parents refuse to cooperate with Don's investigation. The girl's father (Neil Patrick Harris) is an innovative mathematician, and the kidnapping may be related to his work on the Riemann hypothesis. Mathematics used: Cryptography, prime numbers, Riemann hypothesis and Riemann zeta function
6	6	"Sabotage"	Lou Antonio	Liz Friedman	February 25, 2005	102	11.46
Don is investigating a series of train accidents which are recreations of previous wrecks. The saboteur leaves a note composed entirely of numbers. Keith Szarabajka guest stars. Mathematics used: Kasiski examination, Cryptography, Fibonacci sequence, golden ratio and Beale ciphers
7	7	"Counterfeit Reality"	Alex Zakrzewski	Andrew Dettman	March 11, 2005	107	10.55
A strange series of robberies leads Don into a case involving counterfeit money, kidnapping and murder. Don is assisted by Secret Service agent Kim Hall (Sarah Wayne Callies) while Charlie uses math to analyze fake bank notes and track their spread. Mathematics used: Guilloché pattern and wavelet analysis
8	8	"Identity Crisis"	Martha Mitchell	Wendy West	April 1, 2005	108	10.00
A new murder with disturbing similarities to an old case leads Don to question whether he put the right man in jail. While Don tries to find the connection between the two cases, he asks Charlie to look for mistakes or flaws in the first case. Luis Antonio Ramos, Dominic Fumusa, Marek Probosz and Molly Hagan are among the guest stars. Mathematics used: Poker, geometric progression – paper folding, pyramid scheme, fingerprint and Schrödinger's cat
9	9	"Sniper Zero"	J. Miller Tobin	Ken Sanzel	April 15, 2005	109	10.54
Don is investigating a series of sniper killings, and Charlie is searching for an underlying pattern to the attacks. What appears to be bad data can't be eliminated from the analysis, because it fits the only pattern he can find. Lou Diamond Phillips guest stars as FBI sniper and tracker Agent Ian Edgerton. Mathematics used: Projectile motion, Tipping point, regression toward the mean and exponential growth
10	10	"Dirty Bomb"	Paris Barclay	Andrew Dettman	April 22, 2005	110	11.50
A truck carrying radioactive nuclear waste disappears, and Don figures that a dirty bomb will be set off in downtown Los Angeles. When three suspects are caught but refuse to turn on each other, Charlie must try to convince one of them to give up the others and also the location of the waste. David Marshall Grant and Roxanne Hart guest star. In 1946 Manhattan Project physicist Louis Slotin used his body to protect fellow scientists during an accident with a plutonium experiment at Los Alamos; he died of exposure to the ionizing radiation 9 days later after his "walking ghost phase". Mathematics used: Prisoner's dilemma and radioactive decay; Caesium-137
11	11	"Sacrifice"	Paul Holahan	Ken Sanzel	April 29, 2005	111	10.80
A researcher is murdered in his home, and Charlie must reconstruct data erased from his computer while Don investigates possible suspects. Guest stars include Joseph Gordon-Levitt, Corey Stoll, Bruce Davison, and Elizabeth Dennehy. David Krumholtz and Joseph Gordon-Levitt co-starred in the 1999 film 10 Things I Hate About You. Final appearance of: Sabrina Lloyd as Terry Lake Mathematics used: Sabermetrics and econometrics; bathythermograph; Van Eck phreaking
12	12	"Noisy Edge"	J. Miller Tobin	Nicolas Falacci & Cheryl Heuton	May 6, 2005	112	11.80
An unidentified flying object travels over Los Angeles and then disappears. Don suspects terrorist activity, and Charlie tries to find out more about the object and its flight path. Guest stars include Gloria Reuben, Bill Smitrovich, and Ethan Embry. Mathematics used: Combinatorics and conditional probability distribution – "squish-squash" with Fourier analysis
13	13	"Man Hunt"	Martha Mitchell	Andrew Dettman	May 13, 2005	113	11.29
A prison bus crashes, allowing two dangerous convicts to escape. Don is joined by his former Fugitive Recovery partner Billy Cooper (Max Martini) as the Bureau launches an effort to recapture them. Guest stars include Christina Cox and Jennifer Westfeldt. Mathematics used: Bayesian inference, Markov chain, Chapman–Kolmogorov equation and Monty Hall problem
