= When Worlds Collide (Numbers) =

- Numbers episode
- Episode no.: Season 4 Episode 18
- Directed by: John Behring
- Written by: Cheryl Heuton; Nicolas Falacci
- Production code: 418
- Original air date: May 16, 2008

Guest appearances
- Barber Ali as The Real Hassan Mazari; Shan Ali as Hadi Rafiq; Michael Balsley as Cop; Shawn Doyle as Shane O'Hanahan; John Hawkinson as Attorney; Željko Ivanek as William Fraley; Nick Jaine as Benjamin Rajar; Ravi Kapoor as Phil Sanjrani; Roman Mitichyan as Kaleen Rafiq; Paul Vincent O'Connor as Max Flaherty; Meera Simhan as Asha Rafiq; Tiya Sircar as Shaza Rafiq; Kevin Symons as CIA Officer; David Valcin as Sport Coat #1

Episode chronology
| ← Previous "Pay to Play" | Next → "High Exposure" |
- Numbers season 4

"When Worlds Collide" is the 18th episode and the season finale of the fourth season of the American television show Numbers. In the episode, two brothers, one a Federal Bureau of Investigation (FBI) Special Agent and the other a mathematician, disagree with each other on the issue of academic freedom after one of the mathematician's friends is arrested on terrorism charges. Series creators Cheryl Heuton and Nicolas Falacci, who wrote the episode, first mentioned the idea for the brothers' conflict during a season two commentary. When Heuton and Falacci wrote the episode for season four, their episode launched a story arc that was later resolved during season five.

"When Worlds Collide" first aired in the United States on May 16, 2008. Critics gave the episode positive reviews. One called the episode "intense" while another called it "game-changing". In addition, this episode also marks the final appearance of Megan Reeves.

== Plot summary ==
Two men are kidnapped . Meanwhile, in front of Drs. Charlie Eppes (David Krumholtz) and Larry Fleinhardt (Peter MacNicol), FBI Special Agent William Fraley (Željko Ivanek) arrests Dr. Phil Sanjrani (Ravi Kapoor), one of Charlie's friends, on charges of sending classified information that could assist terrorists to Pakistan. When Charlie, an FBI math consultant, goes to the FBI office to discuss Phil's arrest, FBI Special Agent Don Eppes (Rob Morrow), Charlie's brother, asks Charlie to link Phil to the kidnappings as Phil and the kidnapping victims belonged to the same Pakistani charity. While insisting on Phil's innocence, Charlie suggests using social network analysis to find the connection between the victims and their kidnapper. Don, Fraley, and FBI Special Agents David Sinclair (Alimi Ballard), Colby Granger (Dylan Bruno) and Megan Reeves (Diane Farr) uncover evidence that the kidnapping victims could be planning an RPG attack on a Los Angeles school. Although Phil asserts that he sent research on DNA modification of crops to Pakistan, Fraley insists that Phil has given terrorists a way to create a bioweapon. Megan is not convinced of Phil's guilt. Charlie's analysis reveals that, by the FBI's own criteria, neither Phil nor the charity is linked to terrorism. David and Colby later find the kidnapping victims dead.

At Charlie's house, Don argues that national security should be a priority while Charlie insists that Don should not tell Charlie how to work. Their father, Alan Eppes (Judd Hirsch), asserts that the brothers' individual beliefs are at the heart of their conflict. At CalSci, Charlie, Larry, and Dr. Amita Ramanujan (Navi Rawat), Charlie's girlfriend and colleague, learn that Phil's research most likely could not produce a bioweapon. The team attempts to arrest a man who shares the same name as one of Phil's friends. Phil confirms this when Charlie visits him in prison. Phil also tells Charlie that Phil did not send all of his research to Pakistan. Meanwhile, upon Charlie's suggestion to look at the evidence in a different light, Don, David, and Fraley realize that the men could have been involved in a construction project at the school and that the kidnappers left some evidence behind. Charlie's analysis reveals that the victims were suspicious of how the charity's funds were being spent, confirming what David and Colby uncovered earlier at the charity. At the house, Charlie asks Don if Don would arrest Charlie for having colleagues in countries linked to hostile actions, and Don responds that he would not. Later, while chasing a suspect, Don and David realize that their suspect was not Pakistani.

On a hunch, Megan uncovers a link between the charity and the Irish Republican Army (IRA). David and Colby learn of their suspect's (Shawn Doyle) true name: Shane O'Hanahan. O'Hanahan had posed as a member of the charity to redirect the charity's funds to the IRA. The FBI team arrest O'Hanahan as O'Hanahan goes to the airport. After the arrest, Megan tells David and Colby that she is leaving the FBI and returning to Washington, DC to finish her Ph.D. and to begin a career in counseling female prisoners, something that she had earlier discussed with Larry and Don. At CalSci, with Larry and Amita as witnesses, Charlie sends the rest of Phil's research to Pakistan. Hours later at the house, in front of Alan and Don, Charlie turns himself in to federal authorities. Larry confronts Charlie and Fraley, who now believes Charlie, about the loss of Charlie's security clearance and demands that Fraley return Charlie's clearance. At the house, Alan tries to get his sons to discuss the incident over dinner. Don receives a call about a case and leaves the house without telling his family about the case. Charlie then realizes that he is going to have difficulty in not being involved in FBI work.

== Production ==
=== Writing ===
During the commentary for "Protest", series creators/executive producers Cheryl Heuton and Nicolas Falacci mentioned that, for early season three, they wanted to have a story that contrasted Charlie's and Don's opinions about academic freedom. Throughout the course of the series, the writers attempted to both explicitly and implicitly show Charlie's attempt to balance his FBI consultation work with his academic work. They also wanted to show viewers to see the repercussions of that conflict. At the end of season four, series producers decided to have the conflict between national security and academic freedom as the season finale. They planned to have the brothers' relationship with each other altered in that they would realize that their work together did not prevent them from having a difference in opinion.

To resolve one of the issues brought up in "When Worlds Collide", the loss of Charlie's security clearance, the writers and producers developed a four to five episode storyline for season five. In the arc, Larry and Amita served as the main math consultants while Charlie attempted to regain his clearance. Carl McGowan (Keith Carradine), a tough FBI agent created by writers to be unlikable, was brought in to investigate Charlie. The arc culminated in the episode "Jack of All Trades", in which Charlie regained his clearance.

== Reception ==
Critically, the episode received positive reviews. Jeffrey Robinson of DVD Talk called "When Worlds Collide" "strong" and "a pretty intense storyline". One of Amazon.com's editors, Donald Liebenson, called "When Worlds Collide" "game-changing".
