= Uncertainty Principle (Numbers) =

- Numbers episode
- Episode no.: Season 1 Episode 2
- Directed by: Davis Guggenheim
- Written by: Cheryl Heuton, Nicolas Falacci
- Production code: 104
- Original air date: January 28, 2005

Guest appearances
- Susan Beaubian as FBI Tech Agent #1; J. Paul Boehmer as FBI Agent Team Leader; Gibby Brand as Dr. Michael Sabello; Andrew Caple-Shaw as Agent McKnight; Amanda Carlin as Forensics Technician; David Carrera as Adler; Alan Davidson as Robert Skidmore; Robinne Lee as Agent Larkin; Ajay Mehta as ADS Manager; Ken Meseroll as Captain Joe MacNevish; Catherine O'Connor as Woman; Sam Wellington as Bank Manager; Matthew Yang King as FBI Tech Agent #2

Episode chronology
← Previous "Pilot"	Next → "Vector"
- Numbers season 1

"Uncertainty Principle" is the second episode of the first season of the American television series Numb3rs. Based on a real bank robbery case, the episode features a Federal Bureau of Investigation (FBI) math consultant's prediction being incomplete after FBI agents find themselves in an unexpected shootout with suspected bank robbers. Series writers Cheryl Heuton and Nicolas Falacci wanted to explore the emotional effects of the case on Dr. Charlie Eppes (David Krumholtz). For the mathematics used in the case, they included several mathematical and physics concepts, such as the Heisenberg uncertainty principle, P versus NP problem, and Minesweeper game.

The episode was directed by Davis Guggenheim and filmed in Los Angeles, California. Due to the type of scenes in the episode, filming took over nine days. During production, CBS requested that the producers tone down slightly the level of violence in the opening action sequence and that one additional narrative element involving FBI Agent David Sinclair be removed for the sake of clarity.

After being moved from fourth to second, "Uncertainty Principle" first aired in the United States on January 28, 2005. Critics gave the episode mixed reviews. One mathematician disliked the focus on the emotional reaction while critics liked the episode.

== Plot summary ==
Following a lead, FBI Special Agents Don Eppes (Rob Morrow), Terry Lake (Sabrina Lloyd), and David Sinclair (Alimi Ballard) stake out two banks which are possibly the Charm School Boys' next target. The agents' lead comes from their math consultant and Don's younger brother, Dr. Charlie Eppes (David Krumholtz), who used probability theory and statistical analysis to predict the targets. The Charm School Boys, a pair of nonviolent and polite bank robbers, rob the bank which Terry and David have under surveillance. Terry and David's team attempt to arrest the pair, but Terry and David, and later Don, find themselves in the middle of a shootout with the bank robbers and a couple of the robbers' accomplices. After the firefight dies down, Don and Terry follow the ringleader into a nearby building. The bank robber overpowers Don, shoots Don with Don's own gun, and flees the scene with the gun. Charlie arrives at the scene and finds Don being treated for a minor gunshot wound to his arm.

Back at the FBI office, the team determines that Charlie's model is the only viable lead. Charlie, horrified by the sight of the crime scene, withdraws himself from the investigation since one of his model's assumptions was that the robbers were nonviolent. Don sends Charlie home to get some rest. Instead, Charlie begins working on P vs. NP in the family garage, a problem that he had worked on during the three months before his mother died of cancer. Don returns to the house and learns about Charlie's actions from their father, Alan Eppes (Judd Hirsch). When Don confronts Charlie, Charlie expresses his fear of Don being fatally shot during another confrontation with the Charm School Boys.

At the office, the team uncovers evidence which confirms Don's suspicion that one of the bank robbers was military-trained. They also learn that the robbers had killed a computer programmer and had stolen the programmer's identity. As the agents discuss the case, they learn of another bank robbery committed by the Charm School Boys. This time, the robbers fatally shoot a bank president who attempted to confront them, and video surveillance footage shows that Don's gun is present at the scene.

Back at the house, Don, expressing the increased risk to him and his team, tells Charlie that he needs Charlie's help. Later, Alan comforts Charlie by saying that Charlie's mother understood why he chose to work on P vs. NP instead of spending his final three months with her. Charlie then resumes work on the case and realizes that he failed to consider that the bank robbers spent a much longer time outside the bank after the robberies than most bank robbers would have. At the office, Charlie tells the team that the robbers were using Federal Reserve routing numbers stored on each bank's computers to locate a shipment of cash going to an undisclosed Federal Reserve location to be destroyed. The team assumes that the bank robbers need the computer programmer's knowledge to access the data. The team also learns that one shipment is scheduled to leave for the location in a few hours.

Don, Terry, and David split up; Don stays with the shipment while David and Terry serve as the decoy shipment. After being diverted under an expressway, David and Terry are confronted by the bank robbers, one of whom has an RPG aimed at them, allowing the leader to escape. On David's signal, though, the RPG-wielding man is taken out by an FBI sniper, giving both David and Terry the opportunity to arrest the other team members with backup from their fellow FBI agents. The ringleader who is running through the streets of L.A. ditches his jacket and attempts to flee in a car, only to be ambushed by Don and a group of FBI personnel with the ringleader being arrested while Don takes back his gun. Back at the house, Don breaks the news about the arrest to Charlie and Alan. Charlie tells Don that he has stopped working on P vs. NP in order to focus on other problems.

== Production ==
=== Writing ===
"Uncertainty Principle" is based on a series of bank robberies, solved with the assistance of an Arkansas mathematician, that occurred in Maryland in 2004. Since bank robbers follow predictable patterns, the FBI called in the mathematician to specifically predict which banks were likely targets. The bank robber was arrested while selecting his next target.

Early in the series, series creators Cheryl Heuton and Nicolas Falacci decided that one of the elements in the series would be the emotional effects of cases on the characters. When writing "Uncertainty Principle", Heuton and Falacci wanted to show Charlie's reaction to the violent nature of Don's work. They learned during their research on mathematicians that, in real-life, most mathematicians dislike violence. Heuton and Falacci decided to incorporate into the episode elements, including an opening shootout, from their earlier feature writing. While discussing the episode in "Uncertainty Principle"'s commentary, Heuton and Falacci mentioned that Charlie could not tolerate Don being shot shortly after their mother's death.

Heuton and Falacci changed the title of the episode from "Cause and Causality" to "Uncertainty Principle" after including the Heisenberg uncertainty principle in the script. Heuton and Falacci wanted to use the principle more as a metaphor expressing Charlie's decision to leave the case than as an application to the case.

In developing the script, Falacci and Heuton wanted to include a problem that would be unsolvable. They asked Dr. Gary Lorden of the California Institute of Technology for a problem. Lorden suggested using P vs. NP. P vs. NP describes the length of time needed to solve a problem as compared with the number of steps in the problem. Generally, the length of time increases as the numbers of steps increase. P signifies polynomial time, the length of time in which a problem can be solved by a computer algorithm even when the number of steps in the problem increases. NP represents non-deterministic polynomial time. Although a solution to a NP-type problem has not been discovered, a computer algorithm should be able to verify the NP-type problem in polynomial time once the solution is found. Leonid Levin, Stephen A. Cook of the University of Toronto, and Richard Karp of the University of California, Berkeley proposed a type of problem known as a NP-complete problem. They proposed that if one can solve one NP-type problem, one can solve every NP-type problem in the same number of steps as it took to solve the first problem. Previously, scientists assumed that P and NP should be equal. Since a solution to NP-type problems have not been discovered yet, they conclude that the two are not equal.

During their research, Heuton and Falacci found a real-life variation of the problem called Minesweeper.

With regards to the series, the episode set the backstory of the characters, particularly the Eppes family. First, the episode highlighted the Eppes family's dynamics and the intensity of the dynamics, especially the effects of Charlie's genius on Don. While Don and Charlie's parents met Charlie's educational needs, Don's needs were neglected. Second, the episode explained the absence of Mrs. Eppes. While creating the series, Heuton and Falacci included Mrs. Eppes in the family. During the show's development, CBS asked the creators to eliminate the role of Mrs. Eppes. The episode was also the first episode to end with a family moment. Falacci and Heuton felt that the family moments would show that the series was about a family.

=== Production ===
The cast and crew delayed production of "Uncertainty Principle" until director Davis Guggenheim could film the episode. Guggenheim decided to film the episode similar to a movie. He used an experiential form of shooting, which allowed the audience to see the action from a character's viewpoint. He also shot through clear boards, a filming technique that would be used in subsequent episodes of Numb3rs.

The opening shootout was shot at the LA Center Studios, the studios where Numb3rs filmed, a few weeks after production began on the series. For most of the actors involved, it was their first shootout. Halfway through filming, the production crew realized that they needed nine and one-half days to film the episode instead of the usual eight days. Producers and Guggenheim used the extra day of filming to film the shootout. Also shot at LA Center Studios was the scene where Don lost his gun. Unable to use a hardware store as planned, the producers changed the location to the studio's basement.

While filming at the house that series producers rented for the series, Guggenheim suggested that a scene in which Charlie placed chalkboards in the garage. Although the scene was not on the schedule, Guggenheim felt it was essential to the story. David Grynkiewicz, a graduate student of Dr. Rick Wilson's who was working with the series producers, developed the mathematics within one-half hour without any guidance. The boards in the garage would also be used in subsequent episodes. Guggenheim also designed and filmed the Minesweeper audience-vision.

During the production of the arrest scene, the production crew and Guggenheim discussed the size of the scene. The producers and Guggenheim debated whether to include the RPG in the scene, and Guggenheim eventually decided to include it. Due to the filming schedule, the scene was filmed during the Christmas break. Producers changed the location for the scene from the Los Angeles River as storms occurred before filming.

Throughout production, CBS executives objected to the violent nature of the episode. They asked Guggenheim to make it less violent, but Guggenheim refused when possible. The executives also expressed concern about the overall plot of the episode. They felt that it would be too early in the series to show Charlie's emotional reaction to the violence. The executives expressed concern about Charlie's emotional state during a scene set in the Eppes family garage where Charlie recalled the violence. Heuton and Falacci agreed to remove the scene as they felt that the scene did not suit the plot. Citing the convention that the protagonist in a crime drama does not lose his or her gun, the network executives also felt that the loss of Don's gun was inappropriate for the series. Heuton and Falacci insisted on keeping it in the script, and series regular Rob Morrow also liked the idea of Don losing his gun. Heuton and Falacci assured the executives that Don would have an emotional reward at the end of the episode.

=== Post-production ===
After producers sent the film to the network, the producers learned that CBS's test audience requested the inclusion of two additional scenes. The first scene to be included was a scene in which Don explained Charlie's reaction to their mother's chemotherapy and subsequent death due to cancer. In the original script, the explanation was never given. Heuton and Falacci added the scene for storytelling purposes. CBS wanted the audience to follow the plot without any confusion.

The second scene was a scene toward the end of the episode in which Don and Charlie talk while Don prepares for the arrest. The scene was in the original script as Charlie's emotional reward and as the reformation of Don and Charlie's partnership. During production, the production crew realized that they did not have enough time to film the scene, and the scene was removed from the production schedule. After the test audience suggested its inclusion, the cast and crew filmed the scene.

=== Scheduling ===
Originally scheduled to air fourth, the episode instead followed the "Pilot". The network executives wanted an episode which would attract an audience to the series with both the characters and the action. In spite of earlier protests during production about the violent nature of the episode, the executives felt that "Uncertainty Principle" was a strong story to follow the "Pilot".

== Reception ==
When it first aired on January 28, 2005, "Uncertainty Principle" marked the first episode that aired on Friday night. Over 15.46 million people watched "Uncertainty Principle". Critically, "Uncertainty Principle" received a mixed reception. Raazesh Sainudiin, a mathematics professor at the University of Canterbury in New Zealand, disliked the emphasis on Charlie's reaction to the case. Richard Penny, a statistics professor in New Zealand, believed that Charlie confused the observer effect with the Heisenberg uncertainty principle. In contrast, Cynthia Boris, a reviewer for DVD Verdict, called "Uncertainty Principle" "likely the best episode ever". Todd Douglass, Jr., a reviewer for DVD Talk, called the episode "solid...to make the payoff worth it".
