= Pilot (Numbers) =

- Numbers episode
- Episode no.: Season 1 Episode 1
- Directed by: Mick Jackson
- Written by: Cheryl Heuton, Nicolas Falacci
- Production code: 001
- Original air date: January 23, 2005

Guest appearances
- Kristen Ariza as Nurse; Mark Berry as Reporter #3; Gibby Brand as Medical Examiner; Karl Calhoun as Assistant Medical Examiner; Amanda Carlin as Forensic Technician; Lindsay Frame as Teacher; Michele Graff as Rachel; Anthony Heald as Assistant Director in Charge Walt Merrick; John Lacy as Police Detective; Anna Maganini as Reporter #2; Kate Norby as Karen Silber; William O'Leary as Roland Haldane; Richard Saxton as Reporter #1; James Sie as Technician

Episode chronology
← Previous —	Next → "Uncertainty Principle"
- Numbers season 1

"Pilot" is the first episode of the American television show Numbers. Based on a real-life serial rape case, "Pilot" features two brothers, an agent with the Federal Bureau of Investigation (FBI) and a mathematics professor at a Southern California university, using their individual skills to capture a serial rapist who has begun to kill his victims. "Pilot" also introduces the theme of mathematics being used to solve crimes.

Written by series creators Cheryl Heuton and Nicolas Falacci, the episode was filmed twice, once in Boston, Massachusetts and once in Los Angeles, California, with two different casts using two somewhat different scripts. The test audience could not believe that the three men who portrayed the family could be related to each other, so the producers made cast changes to the family. They also made several changes to the rest of the cast to accommodate the changes in the script. Heuton and Falacci changed the script to focus on the brothers' relationship with each other. When filming finished, CBS picked up the episode and the series three weeks later.

"Pilot" first aired in the United States on January 23, 2005. The episode received mixed reviews. Mathematicians and students at California Institute of Technology enjoyed the episode and were impressed with the mathematics in it. In contrast, television critics felt as though the episode's plot about a serial rapist was unoriginal, although one critic called the math boring.

== Plot summary ==
FBI Special Agents Don Eppes (Rob Morrow), Terry Lake (Sabrina Lloyd) and David Sinclair (Alimi Ballard) investigate a serial rapist who has begun killing his victims. With the twelfth victim, Karen Silber (Kate Norby), changing her story again and the thirteenth victim's car missing, Don runs out of viable leads. Taking a map and a case file with him, Don goes to his childhood home, owned by his father Alan Eppes (Judd Hirsch), to take a shower. Don's younger brother, Dr. Charlie Eppes (David Krumholtz) of CalSci's mathematics department, finds and studies the map which Don lays on the dining room table. As Don prepares to return to the office, Charlie tries to talk Don into letting him help with the investigation and is inspired by the pattern of drops emanating from the family's sprinkler. He tells Don that he can use a mathematical model to find the neighborhood where the rapist resides. Skeptical, Don agrees to let Charlie assist him in the investigation.

Charlie develops the model needed to find the rapist and refines it with graduate student Amita Ramanujan's (Navi Rawat) assistance. Charlie's model yields what he calls a "hot zone", an area in which the suspect probably lives. As the case progresses, Silber is found dead in her house. Don and his team resort to comparing DNA samples of men who live in the hot zone to samples of the rapist/killer. Using statistical analysis, Charlie deduces that Silber lied about where her rape took place. After Don learns from Silber's colleagues where Silber was raped, Charlie refines his equation, which yields a smaller area within the original hot zone. DNA, however, clears everyone in the original hot zone. As a result, Assistant Director in Charge (ADIC) Walter Merrick (Anthony Heald) pulls Don and his team from the investigation. At the same time, Dr. Larry Fleinhardt (Peter MacNicol), Charlie's colleague and friend, encourages Charlie to make his equation "less elegant" and to evaluate the worth of his consultation work.

Back at the Eppes house, Charlie and Don discuss what went wrong. Alan is confident that the math is correct. Don tells Charlie that if Charlie ran his model on Don, the model will not show Don at his apartment. Instead, it would zone in on his office, where he spends most of his time. Charlie then realizes that he needs to modify his model to identify two hot zones, one where the suspect possibly resides and one where he possibly works. Using the new equation and a list of potential suspects who work in the new hot zone, Don, Terry, and David confront the suspect and find his latest victim, who is still alive. After Don kills the suspect in a hostage situation, he calls Charlie down to the crime scene to tell Charlie that the suspect lived in the original hot zone but moved three weeks earlier. This revelation proves that Charlie's models are correct.

== Production ==
=== Original pilot ===
Two pilots were filmed. Fascinated by mathematicians, creators Cheryl Heuton and Nicolas Falacci decided to create a show about one. With the encouragement of CBS development executives, they wrote several pilots revolving around mathematicians and scientists, including the pilot for Numb3rs, over the course of 14 years. Knowing that mathematics would not be readily accepted by the general public on its own, Heuton and Falacci in 2003 decided to use the police procedural format to facilitate the acceptance. When Falacci and Heuton pitched the pilot, CBS agreed to produce it about halfway through their presentation.

Although they had considered several story ideas, Heuton and Falacci wanted to feature a case in which math was used to solve a traditional type of crime. They decided to base the episode on a real-life serial rapist case in which police asked Dr. Kim Rossmo to assist them in the investigation. In 1998, Rossmo, then with the Vancouver Police Department, was called in to help Lafayette, Louisiana, police investigator McCullan Gallien find the South Side Rapist. Rossmo and Gallien visited the crime scenes, and Rossmo used criminal geographic targeting, a mathematical model used to find the area in which the suspect would most likely reside. Together, Rossmo and Gallien developed a map indicating the most likely location of the rapist's residence. After DNA cleared everyone living in the area, Gallien learned that a sheriff's deputy in a neighboring department, Randy Comeaux, was a potential suspect. He had lived in the area during the time frame of the rapes but moved to a residence in the neighboring jurisdiction some time later. DNA on a cigarette butt left by Comeaux confirmed that he was the rapist, and Comeaux was arrested.

The pilot was originally filmed in Boston, which was selected because of Falacci's familiarity with the area and because of the contrast between academia and the working class. Filming began in the spring of 2004. Although the Massachusetts Institute of Technology (MIT) refused to allow filming on campus, the cast and crew spent two days filming in the city. Dr. Tony Chan of UCLA's physical science department consulted on the original pilot episode. Although initially hesitant about auditioning, David Krumholtz was the first person cast and won the role of Charlie Eppes. Other original cast members were Len Cariou as Alan; Gabriel Macht as Don; Peter MacNicol as Charlie's mentor; Anna Deavere Smith as Don's boss; Jennifer Bransford, Michael Rooker, and Alimi Ballard as FBI agents; and Navi Rawat as a MIT graduate student. When filming was completed, executive producers Ridley Scott and Tony Scott and producer Skip Chaisson added graphics and music to the footage. They also added transitions to assist the storytelling. To accommodate these changes, CBS allowed the producers to delay the delivery of the pilot to the studio by two weeks.

=== Second pilot ===
When previewed, the focus group liked the concept but hated the way the pilot was produced. Among the problems with the original pilot was the believability of the Eppes family in terms of both physical appearance and chemistry, with the chemistry of the actors being the larger issue. Although Heuton and Falacci liked Cariou, Macht, and Krumholtz, Heuton and Falacci did not know how the three actors playing the Eppes family would interact with each other until filming began.

Since both the focus group and network executives liked the concept of the pilot, CBS decided to recast and reshoot it. Filming began again in September 2004. To accommodate the budget for the new pilot, the second pilot was set and filmed in Los Angeles. Administrators at the California Institute of Technology (Caltech) agreed to allow producers to film the academic scenes at Caltech. Dr. Gary Lorden, one of Caltech's math professors, served as math consultant of the second pilot. The producers kept Krumholtz, MacNicol, Rawat, and Ballard. Rooker and Macht left the cast, and Rob Morrow replaced Macht as Don. Other casting changes included the addition of Sabrina Lloyd as an FBI agent, Judd Hirsch as Alan, and Anthony Heald as Don's boss.

The producers rewrote the script to accommodate changes in story, characters, and basic idea of the series. They decreased the role of Don's boss to focus the main conflict on the brothers' worldviews. They rewrote the structure and composition of Don's team. They also revised the start of Charlie's involvement with the investigation to incorporate Heuton and Falacci's original idea of Don taking the work home with him. When the second pilot was presented to the focus group, the group liked it. CBS picked up the pilot three weeks after filming ended.

== Previews ==
The second pilot was screened at Caltech on January 10, 2005, and Heuton, Falacci, Hirsch, Morrow, Krumholtz, and Lorden participated in a panel discussion after the preview. The students who saw the screening at Caltech enjoyed the episode. The pilot was then previewed during the Joint Mathematics Meeting in Atlanta, Georgia from January 12 through January 14, 2005. Ed Pegg Jr., a member of the Mathematical Association of America (MAA) who watched the episode at the conference, stated that he liked it and that he was impressed with the decision to depict the mathematics accurately. As for premiering on network television, the pilot initially was to air on January 21, 2005, but it was moved to January 23, 2005, after the AFC Championship game in order to be seen by a larger audience. When it premiered on TV on January 23, 2005, 25 million people watched the pilot episode of Numb3rs, beating the audience for the pilot episode of Desperate Housewives by about 4 million viewers.

== Reception ==
Reception of the pilot varied according to the audience in question. The pilot was very well received by the mathematics community. Within a couple of weeks of Pegg's article for the MAA, Keith Devlin, another member of the association, gave the pilot a very favorable review.

As for the mainstream media, the reviews for the pilot were mixed. Gillian Flynn of Entertainment Weekly commented that, given that the case was about a serial killer, the pilot did not show the math in an original way. John Leonard of the New York Magazine called the cast "superb" but criticized the pilot for being too busy. Melanie McFarland, the Seattle Post-Intelligencer's TV critic, asserts that the pilot's storyline was an "unfortunate choice" for the pilot episode. Robert Bianco of USA Today stated that the pilot's storyline was unoriginal. Tim Goodman of the San Francisco Chronicle, however, stated that the pilot and the cast were excellent but that the math was uninteresting.

== DVD notes ==
On the Numb3rs season one DVDs, three features address both pilots. The bonus feature "Point of Origin: Inside the Unaired Pilot" on the Numb3rs: The Complete First Season DVDs highlights the differences between both pilots and features clips from the original pilot. In the feature, creators Heuton and Falacci, executive producers Ridley Scott and Tony Scott, co-executive producer David W. Zucker, casting director Mark Saks, and producer Skip Chaissom detail the changes in cast, filming, wardrobe, and makeup. On the audio commentary for the "Pilot", Heuton, Falacci, Morrow and Krumholtz discuss not only additional changes in the pilot but also additional production trivia from the second pilot. Although the bonus feature "Crunching Numb3rs: Season One" features clips and discussions for other episodes throughout the season, it also addresses the production of the second pilot.
