= List of Numbers episodes =

Numbers is an American television series created by Nicolas Falacci and Cheryl Heuton. It premiered on CBS on Sunday, January 23, 2005, at 10:00 pm with its pilot episode then moved to its Friday slot five days later. It remained in that slot for the rest of its run. The series is set in Los Angeles, California, and follows the stories of a Federal Bureau of Investigation (FBI) team and a mathematics professor, focusing on relationships between FBI Special Agent in Charge Don Eppes (Rob Morrow), his brother Professor Charlie Eppes (David Krumholtz) and their father, Alan Eppes (Judd Hirsch), and on the brothers' efforts to fight crime. A typical episode begins with a crime, which is subsequently investigated by Don's team and mathematically described by Charlie. The insights provided by Charlie's mathematics are almost always crucial to solving the crime.

In total, six complete seasons consisting of 118 episodes were broadcast. The first season, a mid-season replacement for Dr. Vegas, was the shortest of the six, and spanned 13 episodes from January to May 2005. Seasons two and three aired from September to May of the 2005–2006 and 2006–2007 seasons respectively, but season four was cut short by the 2007–2008 Writers Guild of America strike. Twelve episodes were originally produced and aired from September 2007 to January 2008. Six more episodes were aired in April and May 2008 after the strike ended. Season 5 began airing on October 3, 2008, and continued through to May 2009. Season six began in late September 2009 and concluded in March 2010.

In addition to being broadcast on television, Numbers is available on DVD. All seasons have been released encoded for Region 1 and Region 2, and seasons one, two, three, four, and five have been released encoded for Region 4. Individual episodes of Numbers can also be purchased by registered members of the US iTunes Store and as video on demand from Netflix and Amazon Unbox, now Amazon Prime. CBS also streams the episodes on its website.

== Series overview ==
Season	Episodes	Originally released	
Season	Episodes	First released	Last released
1	13	January 23, 2005	May 13, 2005
2	24	September 23, 2005	May 19, 2006
3	24	September 22, 2006	May 18, 2007
4	18	September 28, 2007	May 16, 2008
5	23	October 3, 2008	May 15, 2009
6	16	September 25, 2009	March 12, 2010

== Episodes ==
=== Season 1 (2005) ===
No. overall	No. in season	Title	Directed by	Written by	Original release date	Prod. code	US viewers (millions)
1	1	"Pilot"	Mick Jackson	Nicolas Falacci & Cheryl Heuton	January 23, 2005	101	24.92
2	2	"Uncertainty Principle"	Davis Guggenheim	Nicolas Falacci & Cheryl Heuton	January 28, 2005	104	15.46
3	3	"Vector"	David Von Ancken	Jeff Vlaming	February 4, 2005	103	11.55
4	4	"Structural Corruption"	Tim Matheson	Liz Friedman	February 11, 2005	105	10.68
5	5	"Prime Suspect"	Lesli Linka Glatter	Doris Egan	February 18, 2005	106	10.49
6	6	"Sabotage"	Lou Antonio	Liz Friedman	February 25, 2005	102	11.46
7	7	"Counterfeit Reality"	Alex Zakrzewski	Andrew Dettman	March 11, 2005	107	10.55
8	8	"Identity Crisis"	Martha Mitchell	Wendy West	April 1, 2005	108	10.00
9	9	"Sniper Zero"	J. Miller Tobin	Ken Sanzel	April 15, 2005	109	10.54
10	10	"Dirty Bomb"	Paris Barclay	Andrew Dettman	April 22, 2005	110	11.50
11	11	"Sacrifice"	Paul Holahan	Ken Sanzel	April 29, 2005	111	10.80
12	12	"Noisy Edge"	J. Miller Tobin	Nicolas Falacci & Cheryl Heuton	May 6, 2005	112	11.80
13	13	"Man Hunt"	Martha Mitchell	Andrew Dettman	May 13, 2005	113	11.29

=== Season 2 (2005–06) ===
No. overall	No. in season	Title	Directed by	Written by	Original release date	Prod. code	US viewers (millions)
14	1	"Judgment Call"	Alex Zakrzewski	Ken Sanzel	September 23, 2005	201	11.18
15	2	"Better or Worse"	J. Miller Tobin	Andrew Dettman	September 30, 2005	202	11.83
16	3	"Obsession"	John Behring	Robert Port	October 7, 2005	203	11.40
17	4	"Calculated Risk"	Bill Eagles	J. David Harden	October 14, 2005	204	11.09
18	5	"Assassin"	Bobby Roth	Nicolas Falacci & Cheryl Heuton	October 21, 2005	205	11.17
19	6	"Soft Target"	Andy Wolk	Don McGill	November 4, 2005	206	11.13
20	7	"Convergence"	Dennis Smith	Nicolas Falacci & Cheryl Heuton	November 11, 2005	207	12.36
21	8	"In Plain Sight"	J. Miller Tobin	Julie Hébert	November 18, 2005	208	12.44
22	9	"Toxin"	Jefery Levy	Ken Sanzel	November 25, 2005	209	12.67
23	10	"Bones of Contention"	Jeannot Szwarc	Christos Gage & Ruth Fletcher	December 9, 2005	210	12.53
24	11	"Scorched"	Norberto Barba	Sean Crouch	December 16, 2005	211	11.96
25	12	"The OG"	Rod Holcomb	Andrew Dettman	January 6, 2006	212	13.93
26	13	"Double Down"	Alex Zakrzewski	Don McGill	January 13, 2006	213	12.98
27	14	"Harvest"	John Behring	J. David Harden	January 27, 2006	214	13.22
28	15	"The Running Man"	Terrence O'Hara	Ken Sanzel	February 3, 2006	215	13.31
29	16	"Protest"	Dennis Smith	Nicolas Falacci & Cheryl Heuton	March 3, 2006	216	11.94
30	17	"Mind Games"	Peter Markle	Andrew Dettman	March 10, 2006	217	11.67
31	18	"All's Fair"	Rob Morrow	Julie Hébert	March 31, 2006	218	12.09
32	19	"Dark Matter"	Peter Ellis	Don McGill	April 7, 2006	219	13.69
33	20	"Guns and Roses"	Stephen Gyllenhaal	Robert Port	April 21, 2006	220	12.09
34	21	"Rampage"	J. Miller Tobin	Ken Sanzel	April 28, 2006	221	12.32
35	22	"Backscatter"	Bill Eagles	Nicolas Falacci & Cheryl Heuton	May 5, 2006	222	12.01
36	23	"Undercurrents"	J. Miller Tobin	J. David Harden	May 12, 2006	223	12.35
37	24	"Hot Shot"	John Behring	Barry Schindel	May 19, 2006	224	12.72

=== Season 3 (2006–07) ===
No. overall	No. in season	Title	Directed by	Written by	Original release date	Prod. code	US viewers (millions)
38	1	"Spree"	John Behring	Ken Sanzel	September 22, 2006	301	11.35
39	2	"Two Daughters"	Alex Zakrzewski	Ken Sanzel	September 29, 2006	302	10.69
40	3	"Provenance"	Dennis Smith	Don McGill	October 6, 2006	303	11.07
41	4	"The Mole"	Stephen Gyllenhaal	Robert Port	October 13, 2006	304	10.89
42	5	"Traffic"	J. Miller Tobin	Nicolas Falacci & Cheryl Heuton	October 20, 2006	305	11.95
43	6	"Longshot"	John Behring	J. David Harden	October 27, 2006	306	11.09
44	7	"Blackout"	Scott Lautanen	Andrew Dettman	November 3, 2006	307	11.08
45	8	"Hardball"	Fred Keller	Nicolas Falacci & Cheryl Heuton	November 10, 2006	308	11.76
46	9	"Waste Not"	J. Miller Tobin	Julie Hébert	November 17, 2006	309	10.73
47	10	"Brutus"	Oz Scott	Ken Sanzel	November 24, 2006	310	11.73
48	11	"Killer Chat"	Chris Hartwill	Don McGill	December 15, 2006	311	11.23
49	12	"Nine Wives"	Julie Hébert	Julie Hébert	January 5, 2007	312	12.35
50	13	"Finders Keepers"	Colin Bucksey	Andrew Dettman	January 12, 2007	313	11.58
51	14	"Take Out"	Leslie Libman	Sean Crouch	February 2, 2007	314	10.91
52	15	"End of Watch"	Michael Watkins	Robert Port & Mark Llewellyn	February 9, 2007	315	11.23
53	16	"Contenders"	Alex Zakrzewski	J. David Harden	February 16, 2007	316	10.69
54	17	"One Hour"	J. Miller Tobin	Ken Sanzel	February 23, 2007	317	11.02
55	18	"Democracy"	Steve Boyum	Nicolas Falacci & Cheryl Heuton	March 9, 2007	318	10.29
56	19	"Pandora's Box"	Dennis Smith	Andrew Black	March 30, 2007	319	10.74
57	20	"Burn Rate"	Frederick K. Keller	Don McGill	April 6, 2007	320	10.93
58	21	"The Art of Reckoning"	John Behring	Julie Hébert	April 27, 2007	321	10.15
59	22	"Under Pressure"	J. Miller Tobin	Andrew Dettman	May 4, 2007	322	9.51
60	23	"Money for Nothing"	Stephen Gyllenhaal	Nicolas Falacci & Cheryl Heuton	May 11, 2007	323	10.03
61	24	"The Janus List"	John Behring	Robert Port & Ken Sanzel	May 18, 2007	324	10.18

=== Season 4 (2007–08) ===
No. overall	No. in season	Title	Directed by	Written by	Original release date	Prod. code	US viewers (millions)
62	1	"Trust Metric"	Tony Scott	Ken Sanzel	September 28, 2007	401	9.38
63	2	"Hollywood Homicide"	Alexander Zakrzewski	Andy Dettmann	October 5, 2007	402	9.76
64	3	"Velocity"	Fred Keller	Nicolas Falacci & Cheryl Heuton	October 12, 2007	403	9.16
65	4	"Thirteen"	Ralph Hemecker	Don McGill	October 19, 2007	404	9.85
66	5	"Robin Hood"	J. Miller Tobin	Robert Port	October 26, 2007	405	9.70
67	6	"In Security"	Stephen Gyllenhaal	Sean Crouch	November 2, 2007	406	9.34
68	7	"Primacy"	Chris Hartwill	Julie Hébert	November 9, 2007	407	9.94
69	8	"Tabu"	Alex Zakrzewski	Sekou Hamilton	November 16, 2007	408	10.26
70	9	"Graphic"	John Behring	Nicolas Falacci & Cheryl Heuton	November 23, 2007	409	10.12
71	10	"Chinese Box"	Dennis Smith	Ken Sanzel	December 14, 2007	410	9.75
72	11	"Breaking Point"	Craig Ross, Jr.	Andrew Dettman	January 11, 2008	411	9.81
73	12	"Power"	Julie Hébert	Julie Hébert	January 18, 2008	412	10.08
74	13	"Black Swan"	John Behring	Ken Sanzel	April 4, 2008	413	10.00
75	14	"Checkmate"	Stephen Gyllenhaal	Robert Port	April 11, 2008	414	9.54
76	15	"End Game"	Dennis Smith	Don McGill	April 25, 2008	415	9.64
77	16	"Atomic No. 33"	Leslie Libman	Sean Crouch	May 2, 2008	416	10.33
78	17	"Pay to Play"	Alex Zakrzewski	Steve Cohen & Andrew Dettman	May 9, 2008	417	9.33
79	18	"When Worlds Collide"	John Behring	Nicolas Falacci & Cheryl Heuton	May 16, 2008	418	9.78

=== Season 5 (2008–09) ===
No. overall	No. in season	Title	Directed by	Written by	Original release date	Prod. code	US viewers (millions)
80	1	"High Exposure"	Alex Zakrzewski	Nicolas Falacci & Cheryl Heuton	October 3, 2008	501	8.21
81	2	"The Decoy Effect"	Ralph Hemecker	Ken Sanzel	October 10, 2008	502	8.01
82	3	"Blowback"	Dennis Smith	Robert Port	October 17, 2008	503	8.68
83	4	"Jack of All Trades"	Stephen Gyllenhaal	Andrew Dettmann	October 24, 2008	504	9.33
84	5	"Scan Man"	Craig Ross, Jr.	Don McGill	October 31, 2008	505	10.72
85	6	"Magic Show"	John Behring	Sean Crouch	November 7, 2008	506	11.28
86	7	"Charlie Don't Surf"	Emilio Estevez	Steve Hawk	November 14, 2008	507	9.29
87	8	"Thirty-Six Hours"	Rod Holcomb	Julie Hébert	November 21, 2008	508	11.30
88	9	"Conspiracy Theory"	Dennis Smith	Robert Port	December 5, 2008	509	9.88
89	10	"Frienemies"	Steve Boyum	Nicolas Falacci & Cheryl Heuton	December 19, 2008	510	9.18
90	11	"Arrow of Time"	Ken Sanzel	Ken Sanzel	January 9, 2009	511	10.14
91	12	"Jacked"	Stephen Gyllenhaal	Don McGill	January 16, 2009	512	11.02
92	13	"Trouble In Chinatown"	Julie Hébert	Peter MacNicol	January 23, 2009	513	10.96
93	14	"Sneakerhead"	Emilio Estevez	Aaron Rahsaan Thomas	February 6, 2009	514	10.30
94	15	"Guilt Trip"	Gwyneth Horder-Payton	Mary Leah Sutton	February 13, 2009	515	9.10
95	16	"Cover Me"	Rob Morrow	Andrew Dettmann	February 27, 2009	516	9.62
96	17	"First Law"	Steve Boyum	Sean Crouch	March 6, 2009	517	10.12
97	18	"12:01 AM"	Ralph Helmecker	Robert Port	March 13, 2009	518	9.51
98	19	"Animal Rites"	Ron Garcia	Julie Hébert	April 10, 2009	519	9.80
99	20	"The Fifth Man"	Ken Sanzel	Don McGill	April 24, 2009	520	8.82
100	21	"Disturbed"	Dennis Smith	Nicolas Falacci & Cheryl Heuton	May 1, 2009	521	9.70
101	22	"Greatest Hits"	Stephen Gyllenhaal	Andrew Dettmann	May 8, 2009	522	9.57
102	23	"Angels and Devils"	Alex Zakrzewski	Ken Sanzel	May 15, 2009	523	9.72

=== Season 6 (2009–10) ===
No. overall	No. in season	Title	Directed by	Written by	Original release date	Prod. code	US viewers (millions)
103	1	"Hangman"	Ken Sanzel	Ken Sanzel	September 25, 2009	601	8.10
104	2	"Friendly Fire"	Rod Holcomb	Mark Llewellyn & Robert David Port	October 2, 2009	602	7.85
105	3	"7 Men Out"	Alex Zakrzewski	Don McGill	October 9, 2009	603	7.34
106	4	"Where Credit's Due"	Dennis Smith	Andy Dettmann	October 16, 2009	604	7.77
107	5	"Hydra"	Ralph Hemecker	Sean Crouch	October 23, 2009	605	8.05
108	6	"Dreamland"	Stephen Gyllenhaal	Nicolas Falacci & Cheryl Heuton	October 30, 2009	606	7.74
109	7	"Shadow Markets"	Julie Hébert	Julie Hébert	November 6, 2009	607	8.09
110	8	"Ultimatum"	Dennis Smith	Robert David Port	November 13, 2009	608	8.16
111	9	"Con Job"	Ralph Hemecker	Don McGill	November 20, 2009	609	7.84
112	10	"Old Soldiers"	Ken Sanzel	Steve Cohen	December 4, 2009	610	7.38
113	11	"Scratch"	Stephen Gyllenhaal	Mary Leah Sutton	January 8, 2010	611	9.32
114	12	"Arm in Arms"	Gwyneth Horder-Payton	Andy Dettmann	January 15, 2010	612	9.65
115	13	"Devil Girl"	Stephen Gyllenhaal	Julie Hébert	January 29, 2010	613	8.70
116	14	"And the Winner Is…"	Ralph Hemecker	Gary Rieck	February 5, 2010	614	9.18
117	15	"Growin' Up"	Rob Morrow	Robert Port	March 5, 2010	615	8.10
118	16	"Cause and Effect"	Nicolas Falacci	Nicolas Falacci & Cheryl Heuton	March 12, 2010	616	8.74

== Viewing figures ==
=== Seasons 1–3 ===
Numbers : U.S. viewers per episode (millions)

Season	Episode number																							
Season	1	2	3	4	5	6	7	8	9	10	11	12	13	14	15	16	17	18	19	20	21	22	23	24
1	24.92	15.46	11.55	10.68	10.49	11.46	10.55	10.00	10.54	11.50	10.80	11.80	11.29	–										
2	11.18	11.83	11.40	11.09	11.17	11.13	12.36	12.44	12.67	12.53	11.96	13.93	12.98	13.22	13.31	11.94	11.67	12.09	13.69	12.09	12.32	12.01	12.35	12.72
3	11.35	10.69	11.07	10.89	11.95	11.09	11.08	11.76	10.73	11.73	11.23	12.35	11.58	10.91	11.23	10.69	11.02	10.29	10.74	10.93	10.15	9.51	10.03	10.18

Audience measurement performed by Nielsen Media Research

=== Seasons 4–6 ===
Numbers : U.S. viewers per episode (millions)

Season	Episode number																						
Season	1	2	3	4	5	6	7	8	9	10	11	12	13	14	15	16	17	18	19	20	21	22	23
4	9.38	9.76	9.16	9.85	9.70	9.34	9.94	10.26	10.12	9.75	9.81	10.08	10.00	9.54	9.64	10.33	9.33	9.78	–				
5	8.21	8.01	8.68	9.33	10.72	11.28	9.29	11.30	9.88	9.18	10.14	11.02	10.96	10.30	9.10	9.62	10.12	9.51	9.80	8.82	9.70	9.57	9.72
6	8.10	7.85	7.34	7.77	8.05	7.74	8.09	8.16	7.84	7.38	9.32	9.65	8.70	9.18	8.10	8.74	–						

Audience measurement performed by Nielsen Media Research
