= List of Numbers characters =

This article contains character information for the television show NUMB3RS. The focus of the show is the relationship between brothers Don and Charlie Eppes. Don is an FBI agent, and Charlie is a mathematics professor who consults with Don's team. The show's regular and recurring cast of characters consists primarily of FBI personnel and the faculty and students of Charlie's fictitious workplace, the California Institute of Science (CalSci), and also includes Don and Charlie's father, retired urban planner Alan Eppes.

== Overview ==
Character	Actor	Seasons					
Character	Actor	1	2	3	4	5	6
Don Eppes	Rob Morrow	Main	Main	Main	Main	Main	Main
Charlie Eppes	David Krumholtz	Main	Main	Main	Main	Main	Main
Alan Eppes	Judd Hirsch	Main	Main	Main	Main	Main	Main
David Sinclair	Alimi Ballard	Main	Main	Main	Main	Main	Main
Terry Lake	Sabrina Lloyd	Main					
Larry Fleinhardt	Peter MacNicol	Main	Main	Main	Main	Main	Main
Amita Ramanujan	Navi Rawat	Recurring	Main	Main	Main	Main	Main
Megan Reeves	Diane Farr		Main	Main	Main		
Colby Granger	Dylan Bruno		Recurring	Main	Main	Main	Main
Liz Warner	Aya Sumika			Recurring	Recurring	Main	Main
Nikki Betancourt	Sophina Brown					Main	Main

== Main characters ==
Character	Cast	Occupation
Don Eppes	Rob Morrow	FBI agent
Charlie Eppes	David Krumholtz	Mathematician
Charlie Eppes	David Krumholtz	FBI consultant
Charlie Eppes	David Krumholtz	NSA consultant
Alan Eppes	Judd Hirsch	Former LA city planner
David Sinclair	Alimi Ballard	FBI agent
Terry Lake	Sabrina Lloyd	FBI forensic psychologist
Larry Fleinhardt	Peter MacNicol	Physicist
Larry Fleinhardt	Peter MacNicol	FBI consultant
Amita Ramanujan	Navi Rawat	Mathematician
Amita Ramanujan	Navi Rawat	Computer scientist
Amita Ramanujan	Navi Rawat	FBI consultant
Megan Reeves	Diane Farr	FBI behavioral profiler
Colby Granger	Dylan Bruno	FBI agent
Liz Warner	Aya Sumika	FBI agent
Nikki Betancourt	Sophina Brown	FBI agent

=== Terry Lake ===
Terry Lake (portrayed by Sabrina Lloyd) was a forensic psychologist and often acted as a profiler for Don Eppes' FBI team. Even though she did not understand the intricacies of what Charlie Eppes does for a living, she was more open to the mathematician's antics than her partner, Don.

Sabrina Lloyd did not return for the second season, and Terry did not appear in the last two episodes of the first season. CBS officially stated that her contract had an option to leave after the first season, and she chose to do so. Lloyd wanted to return to New York. The role was not recast; instead, the new character of Megan Reeves replaced Terry, who was written out as having been reassigned to Washington.

Robert Bianco of USA Today considered Lloyd a standout in the supporting cast but criticized the characters making up Don's team as lacking in originality.

== Other characters ==
=== Mildred Finch ===
Dr. Mildred ("Millie") Finch (portrayed by Kathy Najimy) is the newly appointed Chair of the CalSci Physics, Mathematics, and Astronomy Division, and an experimental neutrino astrophysicist who worked on the construction of AMANDA. She is conversant in all of the Division's fields and holds an advanced mathematics degree. At first, she appeared bossy and troubled Charlie Eppes and his colleagues, especially Amita Ramanujan, who researched with her. She did not approve of Amita's dress code or her inappropriate relationship with her thesis advisor but later came around. Mildred gave Amita tenure and appointed her to the curriculum committee, while (as part of their agreement) Charlie must head the admissions committee and aid in CalSci fundraising. Dr. Finch has told Charlie to publish and bonded with him.

Millie is dating Alan Eppes, whom she beat in chess. Being lighthearted, she has made a bet with Alan on who can go longer without using consumer products and has even helped him with his lawsuit by showing that his design specifications were not met.

She is a fan of James Bond films and took a three-month sabbatical from MIT to sail the South Pacific with a friend. CalSci recruit Oswald Kittner (Jay Baruchel) warmed to her, making his decision to become a student easier.

While she does not appear in the last three seasons, she is mentioned.

According to actress Kathy Najimy, Millie is a smart, independent woman who does whatever it takes to get the job done and does not like pursuits of goals contrary to her mission.

Millie was developed as a recurring character to serve as a scientist interested in advancing women's position in science and as Alan's potential girlfriend. She also was created to be another person to guide Charlie. Millie was only scheduled to appear in two to three episodes. With series regular Peter MacNicol's departure to film 24, her role was expanded. Kathy Najimy was not interested in work in television at the time. Upon reading the script, she agreed to star as Millie.

=== Ian Edgerton ===
Ian Edgerton (portrayed by Lou Diamond Phillips) is a recurring character who has appeared in five out of six seasons. He is the FBI's best sniper, as well as being the fourth-best shot in the United States. He is also a top tracker and has the luxury of choosing his cases. Ian also works as a sniper instructor at Quantico when he is not working a case in the field.

According to Colby, Ian did a tour of duty in Afghanistan and was highly respected by other military men deployed there. Colby stated that although it was evident from the aftermath that Ian had been involved in an operation, "you never saw him." Ian is brilliant and loves his work. During their first encounters, Ian and Charlie clashed: Charlie did not believe in using guns to solve problems and disdained Ian's dispassion about killing. In contrast, Ian thought Charlie's mathematic approach was too academic for real cases, and his scientific viewpoint made his objections to Ian's attitude hypocritical. He even went so far in their early acquaintance as to call Charlie's math "voodoo." Despite their early rancor, however, the pair have come to mutual respect for their different expertise and even a kind of friendship. He backed Don up to their superiors regarding Don taking the Crystal Hoyle kill-shot, which took place in "Two Daughters" and Ian referenced in conversation with Don in "Pandora's Box".

It is heavily implied in "Two Daughters" and "Pandora's Box" that Ian used interrogation techniques, including physical force and borderline torture, to get information from a teenage accomplice of Crystal Hoyle. It is also implied that Don has seen or heard of Ian using such techniques before. Given that Ian's superiors were more concerned with discussing Don shooting Crystal Hoyle than Ian's borderline interrogation methods, it is likely that Ian will not be disciplined or will only be disciplined lightly over this incident.

With the kill shot through the cab windows of a pickup truck, executed in "Pandora's Box," Ian hopes to be moved up to the third-best shot in the U.S.

Edgerton did not appear in season four but returned in the premiere and finale for season five. At the end of the season five season finale, Ian goes on a date with Nikki Betancourt. During season six, Ian is accused of murdering one of his informants and taking money from a drug dealer that Ian had arrested years earlier. At the time, Don and the rest of the team struggle to believe Ian's innocence, especially after Ian takes Colby hostage. Eventually, they realize Ian's intentions and work to have him released from prison. Edgerton returned for the season six finale in a cameo appearance where he made an arrest and expressed disappointment that he was not invited to Charlie and Amita's wedding.

According to Lou Diamond Phillips in an interview with TV Guide, Ian was supposed to be a closed-ended role. Members of the cast and crew wanted his character to return, so the writers expanded Ian's expertise. Since then, Phillips remains a cast and crew favorite.

=== Lt. Gary Walker ===
Lt. Walker (portrayed by Will Patton) is an officer of the Los Angeles Police Department, normally working on cases involving gang violence and organized crime. He is a hardened officer but has provided a great deal of help to Don's team whenever their paths cross. He appeared four times, beginning in Season 2 during the episode "The O.G.." In an interview with IGN.com's Travis Fickett, creator and executive producer Cheryl Heuton said that the cast and crew enjoy working with Patton. Heuton also stated that they wanted Patton to return for season five.

=== Oswald Kittner ===
Oswald Kittner (portrayed by Jay Baruchel) is a recurring character on the American television show Numb3rs. A fantasy baseball player who taught himself math, Oswald becomes involved in an FBI investigation conducted by FBI Special Agent Don Eppes (Rob Morrow) and assisted by CalSci mathematician and FBI math consultant Dr. Charlie Eppes (David Krumholtz). Initially a one-time guest appearance, Oswald quickly becomes a fan favorite and reappears in a second episode, in which Charlie attempts to persuade Oswald to enroll at CalSci.

Oswald was originally supposed to be a one-time role. For the episode "Hardball", series executive producers/co-creators Nicolas Falacci and Cheryl Heuton created Oswald to represent the geniuses who fail to receive a formal education. For Oswald's educational background, the writers decided that he taught himself math.

Heuton and Falacci developed the character of Oswald Kittner for another friend of series regular David Krumholtz. When the friend did not audition, Krumholtz suggested Baruchel for the role. After seeing Baruchel's performance, Heuton and Falacci modified the role to include some humorous lines and add Oswald's voice. Although Oswald was a skateboarder, Baruchel never rode a skateboard and spent some time learning from the stunt coordinator and a skateboarder. When Heuton and Falacci brought back Oswald for "Democracy," they added the characterization of Oswald as a Canadian possibly because, during the filming of "Hardball," they learned of Baruchel's tattoo of the Canadian maple leaf on his chest.

Oswald made two appearances, in "Hardball," first airing in the United States on November 10, 2006, and in "Democracy", first airing in the United States on March 9, 2007. In "Hardball," a minor league baseball player collapses during practice, and the FBI is called to investigate. After FBI agents led FBI Special Agent Don Eppes, mathematician and FBI math consultant Dr. Charlie Eppes, and scientists Dr. Larry Fleinhardt (Peter MacNicol) and Dr. Bill Waldie (Bill Nye) discover his sabermetrics equation in both an e-mail sent to the player and on a fantasy baseball web site, Oswald becomes a suspect in the baseball player's death. Oswald has no motive for murder. Oswald is later shot by the real suspect after a discussion with Charlie about Oswald's math skills and is brought to Charlie's house for Oswald's protection. Because of Oswald's math skills, Charlie attempts to persuade Oswald to enroll at CalSci. Oswald also receives two job offers, one from the FBI to develop his equation as an investigative tool and one as a statistician with the minor league team. He accepts the latter job offer.

Fans enjoyed Oswald's appearance on the show and continued requesting Oswald's return. Falacci and Heuton, along with the cast and crew, were amazed by Baruchel's performance, and Falacci and Heuton decided that Oswald was to be a recurring character. The writers wrote another episode featuring Oswald.

In "Democracy," Charlie encounters Oswald and resumes to persuade Oswald to enroll at CalSci. Upon Dr. Millie Finch's (Kathy Najimy) suggestion, Charlie asks Oswald to help him investigate a series of numbers which Charlie's friend, a demographer named Rachel Lawson, left him before her murder. He and Charlie learn that Lawson and her fellow demographers and statisticians unwittingly constructed an algorithm which manipulated election results in precincts with very close elections. Charlie and Oswald's clues lead to a congressional investigation into the election and Lawson's work being published. Oswald then tells Charlie, Alan, and Don that he has decided to enroll at CalSci.

Heuton and Falacci planned to bring Baruchel back for season four, contingent on Baruchel's filming schedule.

=== Dr. Marshall Penfield ===
Dr. Marshall Penfield (portrayed by Colin Hanks) is a recurring character on the American television show Numb3rs. He appears in two episodes, "Convergence" and "Frenemies." The archrival of Dr. Charlie Eppes (David Krumholtz), he is a fellow Princeton mathematics prodigy and has constantly argued with Charlie over everything, including Amita Ramanujan (Navi Rawat). Both were intimidated by one another. Penfield would bother Charlie by calling him "Eppsy," but he now prefers the nom de guerre Chuck after an understanding. He developed the theory of deep current sets and challenged the Eppes convergence. Marshall Penfield is a favorite recurring character of the cast and crew.

=== Robin Brooks ===
Assistant United States Attorney Robin Brooks (portrayed by Michelle Nolden) is a recurring character on the American television show Numb3rs. The current girlfriend of FBI Special Agent Don Eppes (Rob Morrow), she has made several appearances since her first appearance in "The O.G." Due to her commitment issues, she and Don temporarily broke up during season 3 and part of season 4, restarting their relationship during the end of season 4. At the beginning of season five, she attempts to talk Dr. Charlie Eppes (David Krumholtz) into regaining his security clearance. Later, she and Don clash over his spiritual journey, but she eventually accepts it. During "The Fifth Man," she rushes from a conference in Portland, Oregon, to be by Don's bedside when he is stabbed. Don proposes to her in season 6. She rejects his proposal, stating that he is still in the middle of changes in his life. She promises to accept his proposal when he finds what he wants from life and becomes his fiancée by the end of the season.

Actor Rob Morrow asked the producers to explore Don Eppes's personal life, which included his romantic relationships. Writers planned for Don to have a relationship with someone who was not a regular cast member. Michelle Nolden, who had previously starred in Showtime's Street Time as the wife of Morrow's character, was cast as Brooks. Writers and producers planned to bring back Nolden's Brooks for season three. The 2007-2008 Writers’ Guild Association's strike postponed the return of Nolden's character within the storyline. Heuton and Falacci intended to have Robin and Don's relationship continue through season five.

=== Otto Bahnoff ===
Otto Bahnoff (portrayed by John Cariani), who prefers to be called "Ottobahn" like Autobahn, is a brilliant but nervous and excitable CalSci engineer who appears in the season six episodes "Dreamland," "Arm in Arms," and "Cause and Effect." Otto specializes in plasma physics and technology. He serves as a foil for Charlie with his apparent genius, ability to get completely lost in his work, and early uneasiness with criminal violence. As Larry takes over Charlie's FBI responsibilities for his leave to Cambridge, the enthusiastic Otto serves as assistant to Dr. Fleinhardt. He triumphed physicists replacing the mathematicians.

=== Russell Lazlo ===
Professor Russell Lazlo (portrayed by Tony Hale) is an eccentric CalSci geneticist who appears in the season six episodes "Hydra" and "Devil Girl." Charlie says he is like a "savant of genetics." He delights in helping Charlie despite his lack of mathematical knowledge and is happy to meet Amita, wondering if she had any sisters. Charlie and his group seem somewhat annoyed by him. Russell is in a riding club and helps Don with repairing his motorcycle and providing camaraderie.

=== Roger Bloom ===
Roger Bloom (portrayed by Henry Winkler) is an FBI agent who first appeared in the episode "Jack of all Trades." He reappears in the episode "Greatest Hits," where we are informed that he was forced to leave the agency due to the events in "Jack of all Trades." "Greatest Hits" has Bloom working with Charlie using his undocumented knowledge from past relevant cases to help solve the crime, helping him finish his FBI career on a positive note. The last episode Roger appears in is "Old Soldiers," which covers another FBI case he worked on - the case of D. B. Cooper.
