= Thoughtcrimes =

- Written by: Thomas Dean Donnelly and Joshua Oppenheimer
- Directed by: Breck Eisner
- Starring: Navi Rawat; Joe Flanigan; Peter Horton
- Music by: Brian Tyler
- Country of origin: United States
- Original language: English

Production
- Executive producer: Jan de Bont
- Producer: George W. Perkins
- Cinematography: Chris Manley
- Editor: Jay Cassidy
- Running time: 86 minutes

Original release
- Release: 2003

Thoughtcrimes is a 2003 American sci-fi action thriller directed by Breck Eisner.

== Plot ==
A high-school student named Freya McAllister (Navi Rawat) begins hearing voices in her head and is misdiagnosed with schizophrenic catalepsy. She spends nine years in an institution before a government doctor (Peter Horton) for the fictional "National Security Administration" realizes Freya might instead be telepathic – and he promptly whisks her away from the institution and commences training her on an isolated farm for the NSA (not the actual National Security Agency). Teamed up with Homeland Security agent Brendan Dean (Joe Flanigan) to track down an elusive assassin known as Gazal, Freya has been ordered not to reveal her powers to her new partner. They manage to uncover Gazal's identity and bring him to justice.

== Background ==
The film was a pilot for a USA Network series that never got picked up. Shot in Toronto between November 18 and December 20, 2002 it was first released direct-to-DVD in Europe in 2003 and had its TV premiere October 15, 2004 on USA Network.

Most of its main cast went on to play major roles on popular television shows; Joe Flanigan in Stargate Atlantis, Navi Rawat in The O.C. and Numb3rs and Joe Morton in Eureka.
