= Larry Fleinhardt =

- Numb3rs character
- First appearance: "Pilot"
- Last appearance: "Cause and Effect"
- Portrayed by: Peter MacNicol

In-universe information
- Gender: Male
- Occupation: Theoretical physicist

Larry Fleinhardt, Ph.D., is a fictional character in the CBS crime drama Numb3rs, played by Peter MacNicol. He is the best friend and colleague of Charlie Eppes.

Dr. Lawrence Fleinhardt holds the Walter T. Merrick Chair of Theoretical Physics at the California Institute of Science, CalSci (a university based on Caltech and located in Los Angeles in the Numb3rs universe). He is portrayed as a brilliant theoretical physicist and cosmologist, who researches supersymmetry, string theory, 11-dimensional supergravity theory, doubly special relativity, black holes, Ly-alpha emitters, the cosmic microwave background, and gravitational waves, using LIGO to check predictions on quantum corrections. He may have even found a way to express Calabi–Yau manifolds in a way that goes beyond a nonvanishing harmonic spinor and, independent of Charlie, published a work of genius entitled Zero Point Energy and Quantum Cosmology, which could provide insight into the cosmological constant problem (episode 3x4, "The Mole").

== Backstory ==
Larry Fleinhardt has always been fascinated with the stars. He had his first telescope at age three, was the president of the rocket club in the fifth grade, and worked as a docent at his local planetarium while in junior high school. Once a remarkable student comparable to Charlie, Larry graduated from college at the early age of 19. However, Fleinhardt had an addiction with card counting during his years as an undergraduate, which he feels ashamed about and has compared his discomfort during field research at a casino as being at the event horizon of a black hole; this was discussed in "Double Down", an episode that focused on a gambling ring. He wanted to prove the power of mathematics. Dr. Fleinhardt has been teaching for 20 years and Eppes attended his classes at Princeton University, first taking his quantum physics class at the age of 13. Charlie's father, Alan Eppes, said that all the family heard about that first year was Professor Fleinhardt. Dr. Fleinhardt has worked on building a space telescope for DARPA in the past, but it was weaponized against his wishes as part of the star wars missile defense project.

The only thing he remembers of his mother is her warm smile and tweezed eyebrows. He rarely has spoken of his father, a painter who wished his son had seen the world the way he did and was disappointed by his son's path; Fleinhardt expressed his sorrow with a memory he does not gladly inhabit, stating it is a father's folly to impose his will on his son. Consequently, Larry has an exhaustive knowledge of art and attempted a career as a painter, but failed as he was required by his father to study the great works of the masters before he could create an original work.

== Characterization ==
Larry is quite awkward in social situations; his students have described him as "boring and intellectually inaccessible." Some of his irregular views have made Charlie wonder, "What flavor of crazy Kool-Aid do they make you drink before you join the physics department?" When Larry suggested a neural imbalance may be the cause of his lack of dreaming in "Hot Shot", Charlie thought the notion would explain a lot about his friend. Usually, Larry seems relaxed, but, at times, he can be a bit neurotic, or "Fleinhardt". An absent-minded professor, he has forgotten whether he was entering or leaving the CalSci library (and subsequently returned to the library despite insistent reminders that he was exiting at the time). The "Doc" even had his own Eureka moment in "All's Fair", wherein he applied fluid mechanics to the analysis of footprint slabs he submerged in a jacuzzi only to determine, from the relative displacement of water by each indentation, that the suspect to a murder had a short right leg — a discovery that discounted a particular individual from guilt — and ran to the streets dripping wet in a robe, screaming that it was Archimedes all over again, only to forget where he put his clothes the next minute. Larry is disorganized like Charlie and claims that there is symmetry to his chaos. On a similar note, his antics have led him to eat purely white food at times to maintain supersymmetry, a focus in his research. Apparently, as mentioned in "Backscatter", Fleinhardt is awful when it comes to geography — he called to ask if the string theory convention he was already at was in St. Louis or Cleveland, when it was actually in Minneapolis. A perpetual preoccupation with celestial phenomena often has him spouting cosmic metaphors. His character is not unlike that of former acquaintance Richard Feynman, who is noted for being both a genius and an eccentric.

Larry frequently wears casual patterned shirts and drove a 1944 Volvo until he acquired a black 1931 Ford Model A that he cherishes. Fleinhardt owned a personally restored 1877 Victorian home which he sold in "Bones of Contention". The character evinces a distaste for number theory and cell phones, but enjoys hiking. Also akin to Feynman, he percusses, but never for pleasure — he drums away problems. Both he and Charlie are members of the North American Sundial Society, and they have worked together on various contests for the physics department, including a paper airplane contest. Larry has a Zen rock garden and has constructed his own Heron's fountain. He likes to "contemplate the koi pond" in front of Charlie's home, with each fish named by Eppes.

== Evolution over the series ==
Larry constantly challenges Charlie to employ a broader point of view to his work with the FBI and often assists him with this work, as when his cosmic listening project helped him with his signal analysis. However, Professor Fleinhardt frequently expresses his wish that Eppes would continue with academia rather than consult with the FBI. Along with Alan, Fleinhardt provides words of wisdom to Charlie, reminding him that human behavior is unpredictable. He even comforts Don Eppes (Charlie's brother and FBI contact) about his love life with his perspective on quantum entanglement, yet Charlie has accused him of "mixing cosmic metaphors" after he inadvertently referred to his relationship with Amita Ramanujan as a black hole.

After the "untwinable" event of having "carnal" relations with Laurel Wilson ("Sabotage"), a philosophy professor with whom he regularly took hikes, Larry begins to wonder about his life choices, missed (romantic) opportunities, and the impact of children (or wormholes in Larry's view) on people's lives. Larry has additionally noted how demanding physics can be on his social life (that is nigh-nonexistent as a result of his work) and, along with Charlie, understands Einstein's feelings that one can either do physics or have a family, but not both. Meanwhile, he has realized his affections for Megan, and describes to his confused friends, the Eppes family, that they are closer to understanding the mystery of gamma-ray bursts than his feelings in this matter. Thus, Larry begins a relationship with Agent Megan Reeves. When he finds out she is kidnapped in "Two Daughters", Larry's emotions overcome him. Megan claims to like him for his unpredictability. Larry shortly thereafter becomes distracted by his relationship with Megan, and desires more structure. Charlie has not seen such an emotional uncertainty with Larry as when he speaks of her and, as Larry has commented himself, his previously unstructured relationship with Megan made baryogenesis look neat. In "Long Shot" (episode 3x06) they create a schedule for dinner and a movie every other Friday, lunch on Wednesdays, and a monthly wild card that Megan can use at her discretion. Though, he has recently commented that his relationship with Megan has made him less concentrated on his work.

After selling his home, Fleinhardt has for some time since been living as somewhat of a vagabond, finding shelter in his office, his car, hotels and friends' places, and often sleeping on couches or in CalSci's steam tunnels. Larry claims he didn't want to inconvenience Charlie and thought that sharing one bathroom would be problematic, and further did not want to move in with Megan and ruin something "before it even began." He also claims to believe it allows him to focus on the sublime rather than the mundane, as well as gravity. Alan has commented on his state during one of their chess games, providing the same advice he has dispensed to all geniuses he knows: "Don't be an idiot." Contrarily, Megan finds his situation oddly attractive. However, he "rethought the pursuit of a purely intellectual endeavor." Wanting less complexity and more structure in his life, as well as time to be with Megan, Larry states that he has decided to buy a condo. However, life has never been simple for Larry, and Alan has said that simplicity may be impossible for him, so he must deal with structured complexity.

In the episode "Brutus", it is revealed that Larry's divestment of his personal property was in anticipation of being selected as a payload specialist on the International Space Station. His work on the cosmic microwave background has some relevance to the NSA's satellite signals technology and he was contacted by this agency last September to serve as an alternate for the recently detained Professor Johannes Igby, a rival physicist who created the now proven (though initially contested by Larry) Igby's Law to redefine the gravitational flux motivated by sound wave propagation in Bose–Einstein condensates and a candidate on the short list for the National Medal of Science award. Larry is distressed when he first hears of Igby's success from Charlie and sees the vindication in his Quarterly Review of Cosmology magazine, but soon recognizes, to his own excitement in a seemingly conflicting manner, that he is his replacement for the space mission, causing Charlie to believe he is in shock. Megan seems to be the only one who has some idea of this situation that explains his unorthodox living style and prior mystifying absences (to go to Houston), though his friends had thought that these elements were just part of Larry's quirks. Charlie is in disbelief over the matter and is distraught at the potential of a temporary loss of his friend, even worrying about Larry's safety as he boards the next Space Shuttle to the International Space Station for a six-month stay 250 miles above Earth; even Larry is mindful of the risk involved in sitting atop 2 million liters of combusted liquid hydrogen and oxygen. He remands his few prized possessions, including a miniature model of his classic car, a stash of jazz recordings, a Newton Lacy Pierce Prize in Astronomy by the American Astronomical Society he received long ago, a Science Journal International diploma, and an old t-shirt he wore on the first day he posited causal solutions to ultrahyperbolic wave equations and, more memorably, when he vanquished Professor Muskrave at the CalSci Texas Hold'em Tournament, to his closest friend, Charlie. The reason he provides for not informing his friends of the big news is that he considered it a long shot and said it is only with the good fortune that Igby's new responsibilities have prevented him (Igby) from procuring his place on the shuttle, so that he may realize his dream of space exploration. On the other hand, Larry states he will miss Megan and she responds in kind by being supportive and intensifying their relationship before his departure. They even start sharing each other's predilections. In "Killer Chat", Larry's fulfillment of his dream is called into question as a rival in Massachusetts (at MIT) told NASA that he had been living in the steam tunnels. Larry himself says that he is a bird with his wings "clipped" and a "steam tunnel freak", and Megan says he is a "star collapsing in on itself." When Charlie gets him back on the mission, stating to a NASA official that he is "eccentric but brilliant", Larry is grateful. Buzz Aldrin sees him off and Larry's friends watch his launch over a glass of milk due to Larry's propensity for white foods, with Charlie being particularly emotional.

In "The Art of Reckoning", Fleinhardt returns from the space station, landing at Edwards Air Force Base. He was away for four months and twelve days and lost six percent of his bone density due to microgravity effects. Millie states it is "one small step for Fleinhardt and one giant leap for CalSci." While Charlie is ecstatic to see his friend and inquires about the awe in celestial phenomena and his LISA data, Larry is detached and not ready for complex social interactions such as a CalSci welcoming party, although he wants to have dinner with him. He finds the concept of a confined space intolerable and stays at the beach. Eppes is concerned and just wants his buddy back. Larry is deeply inspired by the "fragility and beauty" of Earth. He wears a self-made Inca quipu, each knot representing certain accomplishments he made in space exploration throughout his life. He wants to live without obsessions such as white foods, focus more on life than the stars, and temporarily live in an Altadena, California monastery to make "a transition into reentry." As seen in "Trust Metric", Larry enjoys his time of contemplation and lets his facial hair go, but still has time to dispense advice to Charlie, whether it be mathematical or about life, and even participate in a CalSci student tradition.

The only one with visitors at the monastery, Larry has been rejected by the monks and believes it is time to return from his inner reflections. He misses Megan. When he returns to his office he is ashamed and disgusted by the mess, and, hence, is getting rid of each item, albeit single-handedly for sentimental reasons. Dr. Fleinhardt asserts that he is only going to teach one seminar the whole academic term and is going to continue the search for the Higgs boson, the 'God Particle', with the DØ experiment team, as he received a "tantalizing offer" from them. Amita further points out that this is in line with his spiritual endeavor, after she says that he wants more from life than his recent habit of just walking in gardens, and he shares the same view. Larry reveals he still doesn't have a home when he suggests that Alan would be able to stay with him if he had a place.

In "Tabu", Larry and Megan have become closer again, as she has even asked him to come on the trip to New York to be with her father. He notes his wanderlust has stoked in him the desire to visit New York anyway. As custodian to Brother Theo's rabbit, however, he must speak with him first.

He and Amita spend at least twenty hours a week doing DØ research, though, in "End Game", Larry has a crisis of faith regarding his Higgs boson work, wondering if he is a hypocrite to be searching for something he may not want to find. Charlie points out to him the problem isn't that Larry wouldn't find the Higgs boson, but that he would and his feelings would be the same as his trip to the ISS. The question becomes moot in early 2009 when Larry's Higgs research is stopped due to problems at CERN. In "When Worlds Collide", it is revealed that Megan is leaving the FBI to go back east, to which Larry says that their relationship has never depended on geographic proximity.

Larry and Amita stand in for Charlie with aiding Don until his security clearance is restored, once tricking Charlie into helping unknowingly. His insight into current moving across a conductor is even applied to a case. Larry argues with Alan about the direction of the think tank comprising both of them, Charlie, and Amita ("Jacked"). With Don, Larry advises Charlie to stay clear of the duplicitous Jane Karellen (Nancy Travis), head of DARPA special projects, due to his own experience with her (including romance), and they confront her ("First Law"). Alongside Charlie and Alan, he has been coaching the struggling CalSci basketball team with his physics calculations, but he is not above shouting and even getting NBA players to achieve a win ("12:01 AM").

At the end of season five, Charlie is attacked, and Amita is kidnapped. Don asks Larry to provide the math for the case. Larry agrees and involves Nikki and Liz in some field work. Larry even provides the clue that Amita's kidnappers have been whittling Burr puzzles.

Despite Charlie's engagement to Amita, it is discovered Larry turns down an opportunity to meet with the greatest minds of the world in Geneva and drops his course load for the following semester, leading Charlie to realize Larry is once again leaving, and leaving all of his work to Charlie. His equations, spanning supersymmetry, string theory, supergravity, and cosmology and dating back from his days at Princeton, appear on the walls of CalSci's underground level with a Hindi mark saying सब बेटे के लिए (All for the Son) thereby passing them on to Charlie. He wants to be in the mountains, as opposed to being underground with a supercollider, which Don could appreciate. He is also certain the Higgs boson will be observed without him. Running is easy for him, as he doesn't have to determine his path, though he promises to let Charlie know where he is to receive the wedding invitation. Larry delays his leave, even helping Charlie with work, but soon leaves, ready to depart from Las Vegas. After buying tickets to visit one of several locations, they fly out of his car, and as he goes to retrieve them, he spots several acres of land for sale with a view of the stars that makes him pause. He has continuously contemplated how the universe must taste like raspberries, as astronomers have discovered the 'fruity molecule' ethyl formate in interstellar space.

At the end of "Devil Girl", Larry is seen hiking over a ridge toward Los Angeles a short time after Don passes the ridge on his motorcycle. He reveals himself in the following episode as he hides out in the Eppes garage. Larry has long unkempt hair and a beard, with Alan stating he has a "Howard Hughes look." He stayed approximately 150 miles from Los Angeles in the Mojave Desert, having spoken only to coyotes. He has missed working on Don's cases, referring to "the chase." Refreshed, Fleinhardt has a clarity of thought that excites Charlie and upsets the unconvinced Alan, as his equal in chess has now become like Garry Kasparov. Dr. Fleinhardt looked to the sky and saw the death of a star 2.2 million lightyears distant, realizing that he has always looked into the past at celestial corpses, and instead, looking ahead, he thinks he has discerned the future of the cosmos. He must now avail himself of the CalSci supercomputer to work on his coherent theory. Eventually, he cuts his hair and has his notebooks (that he worked on in the desert) sent to the Eppes home. Larry shows a phenomenal capacity for memorizing celestial matters and performing calculations therein, again delighting Charlie. In the sixth season finale, he serves as minister for Charlie's wedding, ordained specifically for the ceremony by the Universal Life Church, and discusses connections between the fundamental forces in the universe and Charlie's and Amita's love for each other. Larry will help renovate the Eppes garage for Alan while living there as Charlie and Amita take their visiting professorships at Cambridge University, and will further continue Charlie's FBI consulting with the aid of fellow physicist Otto Bahnoff.

== Creation ==
The script called for Charlie to have a mentor at MIT. Peter MacNicol was cast as Larry Fleinhardt.

In episode 4x12, "Power" (air date 1-18-2008), Fleinhardt accepts an invitation to join Fermilab's Dzero collaboration, working to solve the mysteries of the universe and find the Theory of Everything. Co-writer Nick Falacci offered the following explanation for this plot development: "Like real-life physicists, Fleinhardt hit a roadblock trying to create an 11-dimensional supergravity theory. The search for an answer takes Fleinhardt to his particle physics roots and a cutting-edge study of extra-dimensional gravitons and the Higgs boson -- DZero and its sister detector collaboration, CDF, are leaders of that search at the energy frontier."

== Accommodation of MacNicol's appearance on 24 ==
Peter MacNicol appeared in the first 11 episodes of season three before taking on his role on 24. According to creator and executive producer Cheryl Heuton, producers were uncertain as to the date of MacNicol's return, but, as of an interview with TVGuide.com's Michael Ausiello, they already developed a few story ideas to write Fleinhardt back into the script. Fleinhardt became a regular again shortly after MacNicol's return to the show.

The arc began with "Brutus" (air date 11-24-2006), with Fleinhardt leaving for the ISS at the end of episode 3x11, "Killer Chat" (air date 12-15-2006), and returning in "The Art of Reckoning" (air date 4-27-2007).

== Reception ==
Early reception for Larry was positive. Larry was a favorite character for CBS executive Nina Tassler. Tim Goodman, of the San Francisco Chronicle, liked MacNicol's performance as Larry, calling him "nutty" and "wonderful". Toni Fitzgerald of Media Life Magazine stated that MacNicol, as Larry, "brings a welcome eccentric flavor to "Numb3rs" that's missing from "CSI" and its ilk". Robert Bianco of USA Today called Larry "the show's most original character". Creator and executive producer Cheryl Heuton acknowledged in an interview with TVGuide.com's Michael Ausiello that Larry is a fan favorite.

At Larry's mention of DZero's research effort, real-life researchers with the project were pleasantly surprised. DZero members have taken a fondness to the show's reference to their research and have created an office for the fictional particle physicist in the assembly building.
