= Aya Sumika =

American actress

- Born: August 22, 1980 (age 45)
- Occupations: Actress, fashion designer
- Years active: 2004–2010 (as actress)
- Spouse: Trevor John (m. 2007)
- Children: 2

Aya Sumika (born August 22, 1980) is a former American actress best known for her semi-recurring role (which later turned into a regular role) as FBI Agent Liz Warner in the television series Numb3rs.

== Personal life ==
She studied ballet at Juilliard.

== Filmography ==
| Year | Title | Role | Episodes |
|---|---|---|---|
| 2004 | Hawaii | Linh Tamiya | |
| 2004 | Bloodline | Lori | |
| 2005-2010 | Numb3rs | Liz Warner | |
