= David Sinclair (Numbers) =

Character in the CBS crime drama Numb3rs

- Numb3rs character
- First appearance: "Pilot"
- Last appearance: "Cause and Effect"
- Portrayed by: Alimi Ballard

In-universe information
- Gender: Male
- Occupation: FBI Special Agent

David Sinclair is a fictional character in the crime drama series Numb3rs, portrayed by Alimi Ballard. First introduced in the pilot episode, he became the usual partner of FBI Special Agent Colby Granger (Dylan Bruno) as well as the primary relief supervisor for the Supervisor of the FBI Violent Crimes squad, Don Eppes (Rob Morrow). At first unpopular with critics, Sinclair has since been recognized as a popular character on the show.

== Evolution over the series ==
Since Season 2, Sinclair is usually partnered with Colby Granger and tried to stick up for him in "The Mole". In fact, in the Season 3 finale, "The Janus List", when Colby is revealed to be a double agent working as a spy for the Chinese, David reacted with deep pain and blind fury at the betrayal, tears welling in his eyes during Colby's confession just before he attempted to assault Colby in the interrogation room of the L.A. office. Even with the possibility of Colby having been a triple agent and the will to save him, David is not ready to see his partner yet, as he feels he does not really know him. Alan Eppes has given him something to think about, as Mr. Eppes had said this is a test of true friendship and that he must try to understand his motives. The two are close once more, but only after many failures to cooperate on a mission.

David was assigned to work with Don Eppes in the pilot episode, by the assistant director. By Season 3, he has been with Don three years, and there is nothing Don can not ask David to do, though, Don worries David may one day realize he has seen too much and leave the FBI. He has knowledge of bomb disposal due to his first posting overseas in Tel Aviv, Israel. In addition, David did some work for the Long Beach FBI office.

David carries a Glock 22 pistol.

David's two best friends in childhood were Ben Ellis and Earl Day, as revealed in the episode "Contenders". He grew up in the Bronx, attended Cornell University ("Black Swan"), and has mentioned growing up dodging gangs to get an education. He currently lives in Venice, California. David was upset when his sister, Linda, was divorced but went back to her ex-husband. Sinclair enjoys Alan's cooking and he is infatuated with medical examiner Claudia Gomez (Lauren Vélez).

When season five opens, David wants to consult Charlie but cannot. During Carl McGowan's investigation into Don, McGowan tries to appeal to David's leadership qualities as a way to get David to turn Don in; David refuses.

David believes in that others were involved in the JFK assassination. This causes an argument with Colby.

During the investigation of a train crash, David is assigned to assist with recovering victims. He becomes impatient with the course of the recovery effort, especially with Charlie's request for patience. David snaps at Charlie and then goes into the train crash to deliver an inhaler to one of the victims. Colby goes in after David. After the rescue, David apologizes to Charlie.

When Buck Williams comes after Don, David is dismayed at Don's behavior. He confronts Don about it. Don tells David to trust him or report him. David decides to trust him. Later, during another investigation, David tells Don that he (Don) is a good leader.

Toward the end of season five, David applies to be Don's primary relief supervisor. Don first leaves the letter of recommendation on his desk for David to read. Unbeknownst to David, Don placing David as Liz's handler served as some on-the-job training as a primary relief supervisor. After the case is solved, Don breaks the news that the request was approved. David is then asked to lead the team, including Don, into a home invasion in progress. When Don is stabbed, David takes over for Don until Don returns to the office. In the sixth season finale, he leaves Don's team to take a leadership position with an anti-corruption team based in Washington, DC.

== Creation ==
David Sinclair was a character in the original pilot of Numb3rs. To prepare for his role as Special Agent David Sinclair, Alimi Ballard toured the FBI headquarters and spoke with members of the FBI.

== Reception ==
Robert Bianco, of USA Today, called David "unoriginal". Later reception of David has been more positive. In a public service announcement, Alimi Ballard congratulated the FBI on their 100th anniversary.
