= Liz Warner =

- Numb3rs character
- First appearance: "Longshot"
- Last appearance: "Cause and Effect"
- Portrayed by: Aya Sumika

In-universe information
- Gender: Female
- Occupation: FBI Special Agent

Liz Warner is a fictional character in the CBS crime drama Numb3rs, played by Aya Sumika. A former girlfriend of FBI Special Agent Don Eppes, she has since become a part of Don's team.

== Evolution over the series ==
Liz is a special agent at the FBI Organized Crime Division and the former love interest of Don Eppes. They met when Don was her tactical training instructor at the FBI Academy in Quantico, Virginia. According to Don, she was very wild while in Quantico. In the episode "In Security", it appeared as though Don and Liz broke up due to Don's trust issues. Liz and Don ended their relationship in the episode "Tabu". Liz later told Don that their relationship had run its course and he had stuck with it until it was over. Liz has since returned to the series as a regular cast member.

== Characterization ==
Liz is a tough woman who wants to achieve or exceed the men's standards.

== Creation ==
Since series regular Diane Farr was pregnant and expected to be on maternity leave, the producers and writers wanted to maintain a feminine perspective on the FBI team. They also wanted to explore some of Don's commitment issues. They decided to create Liz Warner to satisfy both desires. To prepare for her role, Sumika spent time at a firing range. Sumika was already familiar with shooting a gun before her role on Numb3rs; she used one in her first TV series several years before. For season five, Sumika was added as a regular cast member.
