= Amita Ramanujan =

- Numb3rs character
- Navi Rawat as Amita Ramanujan
- First appearance: "Pilot"
- Last appearance: "Cause and Effect"
- Portrayed by: Navi Rawat

In-universe information
- Gender: Female
- Occupation: Professor of Applied Mathematics (at California Institute of Science); FBI Consultant
- Family: Alan Eppes (Father-in-Law); Margaret Mann-Eppes (Mother-in-Law; Deceased); Don Eppes (Brother-in-Law)
- Spouse: Dr. Charles "Charlie" Eppes

Amita Ramanujan, Ph.D., is a fictional character from the CBS crime drama Numb3rs, played by Navi Rawat. Over the course of the series, she has become a professor at CalSci and has since become romantically involved with her former thesis advisor, Dr. Charlie Eppes (David Krumholtz). She was first introduced in "Pilot". She also works as an FBI consultant with Charlie and Larry.

== Evolution over the series ==
Dr. Amita Ramanujan is a newly appointed (as of the third season) professor of Indian origin at the California Institute of Science (CalSci). In the first season, she received a doctorate in computational mathematics with Charlie Eppes as her thesis adviser at CalSci, the same institution where she currently holds a faculty position. Because of this association with Charlie, she assists him with various mathematical problems offered through his connection to the Federal Bureau of Investigation and frequently helps him see cases in a new light. She is the best programmer Larry Fleinhardt and Charlie know and is an expert on asymptotic combinatorics. To her surprise, Amita won the 2006 Milton Prize for her dissertation on combinatorics, which Charlie, a previous recipient, presented to her. She decided to use the prize money to fund a trip to India with her grandmother in an attempt to become attuned with her heritage and help with the education costs of two Indian girls she met through one of Don's cases. In season five, she puts her skills to use on a new artificial intelligence, but is nearly killed.

At the close of season one, in which she had completed her graduate work under the supervision of Charlie, she decided to pursue a second doctoral degree in astrophysics at CalSci with a new thesis adviser, Dr. Kepler. When Dr. Kepler became ill, she taught his course on the structure and dynamics of galaxies. She has also given a solar physics presentation. Amita is currently doing research with Dr. Mildred Finch, the new Chair of the CalSci Physics, Mathematics, and Astronomy Division and an experimental neutrino astrophysicist; Dr. Finch put her on tenure track and appointed her chair of the curriculum committee. She also works with Larry Fleinhardt on the DØ experiment search for the Higgs boson.

She and Charlie have had a romantic relationship of sorts throughout the series. The relationship suffered several false starts in season 2. In season 3, the relationship seems to have stabilized. One obstacle to the relationship was Charlie's long-time obtuseness with regard to Amita's interests in him, a fact upon which she commented early in season 2. Her interest in Charlie wouldn't be so compounded if only he could not see everything in the world in mathematical categories. On the other hand, she deeply admires his work, and is filled with awe after touching a chalkboard full of his elegant equations. In Season 2, after Charlie became concerned with her association with Dr. Penfield, she stated she had no time for a serious relationship because of her graduate work on astrophysics. She assured Charlie that her interest in Penfield was only of the intellectual nature.

At times, she has felt that her work has been subsumed by Charlie's research. Amita's professional career further created a conflict for her following an offer for a three-year assistant professorship at Harvard University. At the close of season two, she had not decided if she would accept the position, or remain in California and apply for a similar position through CalSci. With the start of season three, she decided to take the CalSci position and kindle a romance with Charlie. However, Amita said that it would be arrogant for Charlie to think that she only stayed for him.

She is having problems accepting her role as a professor, especially in the view that she was a student only recently at the same university where she now holds a faculty position. Dr. Larry Fleinhardt advised her in recreating her image of herself, for only then would other professors accept her as a colleague. Dr. Finch said harsh words to Amita about her needing to act like a professor and be more than Charlie's assistant and even stated that she dresses like a kid. Mildred disapproved of her dating her former thesis adviser. This caused her to doubt her relationship with Charlie, but he took it to the next step in kissing her in his garage and she did not hesitate. When Dr. Finch saw this, Charlie and Amita were temporarily shocked. In "End of Watch", she nearly quit chairing the curriculum committee, as their colleagues remarked on their relationship.

Amita understood Charlie's sentiments over Larry's leave of absence to the International Space Station and could discern that Eppes had never been in a situation where he was not able to get what he wanted. In "Killer Chat", she stated that she could distinguish between "Professor Eppes" and "Charlie Eppes". Megan Reeves said it was nice that she worked well with Charlie. Also, the two women were proud to see Charlie help Larry accomplish his dream.

Though she said she loves Charlie, Amita did not want him to meet her father, as Mr. Ramanujan always had the expectation that she would only date men born in India. She joked that it would be fine once Charlie won the Fields Medal, which she believes he has the potential to earn. Despite this concern, Charlie has asked her to move in with him, and she is agreeable to the plan. Charlie's ideal situation would be for them to live together in his house and his father to move into a condo; however, the details of the arrangement are yet to be determined. When Charlie finally meets Amita's parents, Tapti and Sanjay Ramanujan, they are very rude to him, dismissing him, at times completely ignoring him, and talking about another man for their daughter. Eventually, though, they warm to Charlie and accept him.

In the season 5 finale, "Angels and Devils", Charlie proposes to Amita at the end of the episode after she had been kidnapped at gunpoint in front of him by the leader of a cult. After Don and the rest of team get her home safely, Charlie proposes to her saying that he has learned this past year (5th season) that life turns on a dime and he doesn't want the things that matter (Amita) to disappear because he waited to see what could happen. Her response is not heard as the episode ends, but it is implied in the first episode of season 6, Charlie and Amita announce to Alan and Don, Charlie's father and brother, that they have decided to get married. Amita and Charlie attempt to find a wedding date that fits them and their families' schedules, finally accepting Alan's suggestion of using his and Margaret's anniversary date as Amita and Charlie's wedding date.

As mentioned in the Season 6 episode, "Hydra", Amita would like to have three children with Charlie. They later admit that they are far too busy for children at this point in their lives, however.

== Backstory ==
Amita was born in California and her family was from South India, speaking Tamil. She mentioned in the pilot episode an arranged marriage (she described her would-be fiancé, a banker from Goa, as "a total ass") but it was unclear if she was serious or teasing Charlie and Alan. It is later revealed in "Pay To Play" that the Banker from Goa has married someone else.

As revealed in "Tabu", she built her first computer at the age of 13. Series writer Sean Crouch wrote “First Law” to explain Amita's interest in computers.

Amita has been a player of an MMORPG called "Primacy" since she was an undergraduate (age 19), which allowed her to provide unique insights into a case involving a murderer who was a jealous gamer.

== Creation ==
The character of Amita Ramanujan was in the original pilot as an MIT graduate student. Navi Rawat was cast in the role of Amita. Due to her commitment to North Shore, writers and producers were uncertain whether Rawat would return to Numb3rs. Rawat's character on North Shore got cut before the pilot even aired, enabling her to return to Numb3rs as a guest star during the first season. She became a regular during season two.

The last name of the character is taken directly from the celebrated Indian mathematician Srinivasa Ramanujan, whose impact on the mathematical field has been enormous. There is even a mathematical journal, The Ramanujan Journal, dedicated solely to the discoveries made by Ramanujan. He died at the age of 32, having made remarkable breakthroughs in his short career.

== Reception ==
Rawat has appeared at the 2005 National Council of Teachers of Mathematics (NCTM) convention in Anaheim.
