= Numbers (TV series) =

American crime drama television series (2005–2010)

- Genre: Police procedural; Crime drama
- Created by: Nicolas Falacci; Cheryl Heuton
- Starring: Rob Morrow; David Krumholtz; Judd Hirsch; Alimi Ballard; Sabrina Lloyd; Dylan Bruno; Diane Farr; Navi Rawat; Sophina Brown; Aya Sumika; Peter MacNicol
- Music by: Charlie Clouser
- Country of origin: United States
- Original language: English
- No. of seasons: 6
- No. of episodes: 118 (list of episodes)

Production
- Executive producers: Nicolas Falacci; Cheryl Heuton; Ridley Scott; Tony Scott; David W. Zucker; Andrew Dettmann; Don McGill; Lewis Abel; Ken Sanzel; Barry Schindel; Brooke Kennedy
- Producers: John Forrest Niss; Michael Attanasio; Christine Larson-Nitzsche; Rob Morrow
- Production locations: Los Angeles, Pasadena
- Running time: 43 minutes
- Production companies: The Barry Schindel Company (seasons 2–3); Post 109 Productions (season 6); Scott Free Productions; Paramount Network Television (seasons 1–2); CBS Paramount Network Television (seasons 3–5); CBS Television Studios (season 6)

Original release
- Network: CBS
- Release: January 23, 2005 – March 12, 2010

Numbers (stylized as NUMB3RS) is an American crime drama television series that originally aired on CBS from January 23, 2005, to March 12, 2010, with a total of six seasons consisting of 118 episodes. The series was created by Nicolas Falacci and Cheryl Heuton, and follows FBI Special Agent Don Eppes (Rob Morrow) and his brother Charlie Eppes (David Krumholtz), a college mathematics professor and prodigy, who helps Don solve crimes for the FBI. Brothers Ridley and Tony Scott produced Numbers; its production companies are the Scott brothers' Scott Free Productions and CBS Television Studios (originally Paramount Network Television, and later CBS Paramount Network Television).

The show focuses equally on the relationships among Don Eppes, his brother Charlie Eppes, and their father, Alan Eppes (Judd Hirsch), and on the brothers' efforts to fight crime, usually in Los Angeles. A typical episode begins with a crime, which is subsequently investigated by a team of FBI agents led by Don and mathematically modeled by Charlie, with the help of Larry Fleinhardt (Peter MacNicol) and Amita Ramanujan (Navi Rawat). The insights provided by Charlie's mathematics were always in some way crucial to solving the crime.

On May 18, 2010, CBS canceled the series after six seasons.

== Cast and characters ==
The show revolved around three intersecting groups of characters: the FBI, scientists at the fictitious California Institute of Science (CalSci), and the Eppes family.

- Don Eppes (Rob Morrow), Charlie's older brother, is the lead FBI agent at the Los Angeles Violent Crimes Squad.
- Professor Charlie Eppes (David Krumholtz) is a mathematical genius, who in addition to teaching at CalSci, consults for the FBI and NSA.
- Alan Eppes (Judd Hirsch) is a former L.A. city planner, a widower, and the father of both Charlie and Don Eppes. Alan lives in a historic two-story California bungalow furnished with period Arts and Crafts furniture.
- David Sinclair (Alimi Ballard) is an FBI field agent and was later made Don's second-in-command and promoted to supervisor.
- Terry Lake (Sabrina Lloyd) is a forensic psychologist and FBI agent. (season 1)
- Prof. Larry Fleinhardt (Peter MacNicol) is a theoretical physicist and cosmologist at CalSci. Charlie's former mentor and now best friend, he also frequently consults for the FBI.
- Prof. Amita Ramanujan (Navi Rawat) is a mathematician at CalSci and an FBI consultant. In season two, she begins dating Charlie, whom she is later engaged to and marries in season six. Charlie was her thesis advisor. Her name is a reference to influential autodidactic Indian mathematician Srinivasa Ramanujan. (seasons 2–6, main; 1, recurring)
- Megan Reeves (Diane Farr) is an FBI behavioral specialist. She was involved romantically with Larry Fleinhardt and left the FBI to counsel troubled young women. (seasons 2–4)
- Colby Granger (Dylan Bruno) is an FBI field agent. Once thought to have betrayed his colleagues, he is now back in their good graces and confidence. (seasons 3–6, main; 2, recurring)
- Liz Warner (Aya Sumika) is an FBI agent, formerly involved with Agent Eppes. (seasons 5–6, main; 3–4, recurring)
- Nikki Betancourt (Sophina Brown) is an FBI agent with four years' experience in the LAPD and a law degree. (seasons 5–6)

== Episodes ==
Opening: (Voice-over by David Krumholtz) We all use math every day. To predict weather, to tell time, to handle money. Math is more than formulas and equations. It's logic; it's rationality. It's using your mind to solve the biggest mysteries we know.

=== Season 1 (2005) ===
The first season aired between January 23, 2005, and May 13, 2005, at 10:00 pm on Fridays. It started the working relationship between Los Angeles' FBI field office and Charlie Eppes. The main FBI agents are Charlie's brother, Don Eppes, and Terry Lake, as well as David Sinclair. Don and Charlie's father, Alan Eppes, provides emotional support for the pair, while Professor Larry Fleinhardt and doctoral student Amita Ramanujan provide mathematical support and insights to Charlie. Season one was a half-season, producing only 13 episodes. Sabrina Lloyd played Terry Lake, an agent, in this season; she was later replaced by Diane Farr, who played Megan Reeves.

=== Season 2 (2005–06) ===
The second season aired between September 23, 2005, and May 19, 2006, again at 10:00 pm on Fridays. Season two has several changes to Don's FBI team: Terry Lake is reassigned to Washington and two new members join Don and David Sinclair: Megan Reeves and Colby Granger. Charlie is challenged on one of his long-standing mathematical workpieces and starts work on a new theory, cognitive emergence theory. Larry sells his home and assumes a nomadic lifestyle while he becomes romantically involved with Megan. Amita receives an offer for an assistant professor position at Harvard University, but is plagued by doubt as her relationship with Charlie is challenged, and her career is in upheaval. Alan begins work and dating again, although he struggles with the loss of his wife and Charlie and his dream of her.

=== Season 3 (2006–07) ===
Numb3rs was renewed for a third season, which began airing at 10:00 pm on Friday, September 22, 2006, and ended on May 18, 2007. Charlie and Amita intensify their relationship, as do Larry and Megan, especially after Megan's kidnapping. Amita has trouble adjusting to her new role as a CalSci professor, and Larry announces his leave of absence; he will be on the International Space Station for six months, which greatly distresses Charlie. Charlie and his colleagues are troubled by Dr. Mildred Finch, the newly appointed chair of the CalSci Physics, Mathematics, and Astronomy Division, whom they learn has begun dating Alan. Meanwhile, Don dates Agent Liz Warner and questions his ethics and self worth, and receives counseling. Charlie sees Don's therapist, and the two understand one another more. Despite Don's concerns, Alan engages in some FBI consulting with his engineering knowledge, and Larry returns from the space station, disillusioned. The finale wraps up with a revelation that Colby was a double agent for the Chinese.

Noticeable changes from previous seasons include removing the opening-credit sequence (credits are now done during the first segment of the show), the absence of Peter MacNicol's character for much of the season, and the absence of Diane Farr's character for a few episodes. Peter MacNicol appeared in the first 11 episodes before leaving for the television show 24, but returned to Numbers for the 21st episode of season three ("The Art of Reckoning"). His character's absence was written into the show by becoming a payload specialist on the International Space Station. Diane Farr, pregnant for most of the season, left the show for maternity leave in episode 18 ("Democracy"); her character's absence is explained as a particular assignment to the Department of Justice.

=== Season 4 (2007–08) ===
The season premiere aired on September 28, 2007, in the same time slot as in previous seasons, 10:00 pm Eastern Time. Because of the writer's strike, only 12 episodes were initially produced. However, once the strike ended, CBS announced the show's return April 4, 2008, with six episodes. The season ended on May 16, 2008.

As this season starts, Colby Granger escapes from jail and is revealed to be a triple agent. He then rejoins the team. Don and Liz break up halfway through this season after Liz has trouble with Don's trust issues. Amita's parents come to visit, which becomes a secondary theme throughout most of the season. Due to her work at the DOJ, Megan is conflicted by her work and turns to Larry. Near the end of the season, Don's girlfriend from season two, Robin Brooks, returns. Don and Robin then continue their relationship. Charlie attends FBI training camp because he has been working with Don for several years and wants to understand better what his brother does. In the season finale, Megan leaves the team to move back to Washington, DC, and Charlie goes head-to-head with Don about a case. This causes Charlie to send information to scientists in Pakistan. He is subsequently arrested and has his security clearance revoked to no longer help Don on cases. At the end of the episode, Don drives away to another case, and Charlie admits that giving up FBI work will be more challenging than he expected.

Several characters from previous seasons did not appear in season four, most notably Mildred Finch and Ian Edgerton.

=== Season 5 (2008–09) ===
The fifth season premiered on October 3, 2008, and the season finale aired on May 15, 2009. The season premiere was moved back one week to accommodate the 2008 presidential debates.

Season five opens three weeks after "When Worlds Collide" (season four's finale), with the government dropping the charges against Charlie. Charlie gets his security clearance back after Don and he fight FBI Security Officer Carl McGowan. Don begins to explore Judaism. The team adds new agent Nikki Betancourt, who arrives shortly after Megan Reeves' departure. Robin is offered a promotion but turns it down. Buck Winters (from the episodes "Spree" and "Two Daughters") breaks out of prison and comes after Don. Alan suddenly finds himself coaching CalSci's basketball team. David becomes Don's primary relief supervisor. DARPA tries to recruit Charlie, but he turns down their offer. Toward the end of the season, Don is stabbed, and Charlie blames himself for it. The aftermath of Don's stabbing causes Charlie to focus more on his FBI consultation work. Amita is kidnapped, and the team races to find her. After she is rescued, Charlie proposes to Amita. Her response is left undisclosed.

"Disturbed" marked the 100th episode of Numbers.

=== Season 6 (2009–10) ===
The sixth and final season premiered Friday, September 25, 2009, at 10:00 pm ET and the season finale aired on March 12, 2010, 3 days before Hirsch's 75th birthday.

The season starts with the engagement of Charlie and Amita. Soon after, Larry turns down an opportunity to meet with mathematicians at CERN, in Geneva, and drops his course load for the following semester. This leads Charlie to realize Larry is once again leaving and leaving all of his work to Charlie. Don learns that his former mentor is crooked, causing Don angst to shoot his mentor. Charlie and Don realize that Alan has lost a substantial amount of money in his 401(k). After some delay, Larry leaves Los Angeles to find a vacant piece of land for sale within driving distance of the city. Alan decides to return to work and finds a job as a software technical consultant. David asks Don for advice about career paths within the FBI. Larry returns from the desert with a new theory about the universe's fate. Charlie and Amita begin planning their wedding and decide to join the Big Brother/Big Sister program to practice parenting skills. They get married before their move to England to teach at the University of Cambridge. Don loses his gun, recovers it after it is used in some vigilante murders, and gets engaged to Robin. He also decides to leave the team, taking an administrative position within the FBI. Before leaving, Charlie and Amita decide that the family garage should be converted to a guest house so Alan can continue living with them. Leaving Colby, Liz, and Nikki behind, David departs for Washington, DC, to a position as an anti-corruption team leader.

== Home media ==
CBS DVD (distributed by Paramount Home Entertainment) has released all six seasons of Numb3rs on DVD in Regions 1, 2, and 4.

On June 2, 2017, CBS DVD released Numb3rs: The Complete Series on DVD in Region 1.

| Season # | Release Dates | | | Ep (#) | Length (min.) | Discs | Region 1 Extras |
| Season # | US, Canada (R1) | UK (R2) | Australia (R4) | Ep (#) | Length (min.) | Discs | Region 1 Extras |
|---|---|---|---|---|---|---|---|
| Season one | May 30, 2006 | October 2, 2006 | October 5, 2006 | 13 | 544 | 4 | Cast and crew commentaries for five episodes, "Crunching Numb3rs: Season 1," "Point of Origin: Inside the Unaired Pilot," "Do The Math: The Caltech Analysis," and "Charlievision: FX Sequences 1.0," blooper reels, and audition reels. |
| Season two | October 10, 2006 | July 9, 2007 | June 7, 2007 | 24 | 1037 | 6 | Cast and crew commentaries for six episodes, "Crunching Numb3rs: Season Two," two "behind the scenes" videos (one with Nicholas Falacci, the other with David Krumholtz), and a blooper reel. |
| Season three | September 25, 2007 | February 9, 2009 | July 10, 2008 | 24 | 1029 | 6 | Cast and crew commentaries for five episodes, "Crunching Numb3rs: Season 3," a mini-documentary of the Eppes house, a blooper reel, and a tour of the Eppes' house set. |
| Season four | September 30, 2008 | July 13, 2009 | July 2, 2009 | 18 | 767 | 5 | "Crunching NUMB3RS: Trust Metric," featurettes for two episodes, "The Tony Touch", pre-production, and post production. |
| Season five | October 20, 2009 | June 21, 2010 | August 4, 2010 | 23 | 983 | 6 | Cast and crew commentaries for three episodes, deleted scenes for "Thirty-Six Hours", "Crunching NUMB3RS: Season Five" featurette, "Celebrating 100" featurette, Blooper reel. |
| Season six | August 10, 2010 | July 18, 2011 | July 21, 2011 | 16 | 660 | 4 | Coming Full Circle: Numb3rs the final season, The women of Numb3rs, Pixel Perfect:the digital cinematography of Numb3rs, Production Photo Gallery |
| Complete series | June 6, 2017 | N/A | December 1, 2011 | 118 | | 31 | |

== Awards and nominations ==
Nicolas Falacci and Cheryl Heuton, the show's creators, won several awards for the show, including the Carl Sagan Award for Public Understanding of Science in 2006 and the National Science Board's Public Service Award in 2007. They also won the Joint Policy Board for Mathematics (JPBM) reward and encourage communicators who, on a sustained basis, bring mathematical ideas and information to non-mathematical audiences Communications Award in 2010. Also, the show's stunt coordinator, Jim Vickers, was nominated for an Emmy Award for Outstanding Stunt Coordination in 2006 for episode 14 of Season 2, "Harvest".

== Representation of mathematics ==
We all use math every day. To predict weather, to tell time, to handle money. Math is more than formulas and equations. It's logic; it's rationality. It's using your mind to solve the biggest mysteries we know.

Several mathematicians worked as consultants for each episode. Actual mathematics are presented in the show; the equations on the chalkboards are mathematically valid, and are somewhat applicable to the situations presented in each show. This mathematical validity and applicability of the equations have been asserted by professional mathematicians.

A book entitled The Numbers Behind NUMB3RS: Solving Crime with Mathematics (ISBN 0452288576; published August 28, 2007), written by Keith Devlin and Dr. Gary Lorden, a consultant to the show along with Dr. Orara, a physics consultant, explains some of the mathematical techniques that have been used both in actual FBI cases and in other law-enforcement departments.

Since the premiere season, the blog edited by Mark Bridger, a professor at Northeastern University has commented on the mathematics behind each episode of the show.

Wolfram Research (the developers of Mathematica) is the chief math consultant, reviewing scripts and providing background mathematics for the show. Starting with season four, their website in collaboration with CBS is entitled "The math behind NUMB3RS".

Alice Silverberg, a mathematician consultant to the show, expressed concern with its use of mathematics, asserting that the math is inserted after the initial script and written to provide plausible-sounding jargon, rather than having consultants involved at all stages of story development. The same part-time consultant offered criticism of the show's portrayal of female mathematicians and expressed concern over the appropriateness of the relationship between Charlie Eppes and his graduate student Amita Ramanujan.

== Production ==
The idea for Numbers was generated in the late 1990s when Nick Falacci and Cheryl Heuton, the show's creators, attended a lecture given by Bill Nye, a popular science educator. The premise of the show is similar to that of author Colin Bruce's reimaginings of the Sherlock Holmes character, and to the "Mathnet" segment on the children's television show Square One.

Gabriel Macht was originally cast to portray the character of Don Eppes. Also, the original concept for the show had the events take place at Massachusetts Institute of Technology; this was later changed to the fictional California Institute of Science, commonly called CalSci. Scenes which take place at CalSci are filmed at California Institute of Technology (Caltech) and the University of Southern California. One of the most frequent campus locations at Caltech is the vicinity of Millikan Library, including the bridge over Millikan Pond, the Trustees room, and the arcades of nearby buildings. At USC, locations include Doheny Library and the Town and Gown dining room. Exteriors for the FBI offices are on the distinctive bridge at Los Angeles Center Studios.

Another common location is the Craftsman home of the Eppes family. The house shown in the first season is real; it is owned by David Raposa and Edward Trosper, although a replica set was used from the second season onwards.

=== Title of the show ===
The show uses the number three in its title instead of the letter "e", in which is found in Leetspeak. In the interviews with Tom Jicha of the South Florida Sun-Sentinel and with Alan Pergament of The Buffalo News, Heuton mentioned that the use of the number three in the title derives from leet, a form of computer jargon that replaces letters with numbers. Dr. Gary Lorden, a California Institute of Technology mathematics professor who served as the show's mathematics consultant, told NPR's Ira Flatow that it was created on a normal computer keyboard. Lorden also mentioned that the use of the number three in the title can serve as a restriction in Internet searches about the series.

Both entertainment reporters and psychologists noticed the title's spelling. Some reporters, such as Joanne Ostrow of The Denver Post, the staff members of People magazine, the editors of The Futon Critic, the staff of the Scripps Howard News Service, and Mike Hughes of USA Today acknowledged the presence of the number three in the title. Lynette Rice of Entertainment Weekly asked Krumholtz about the three in the title; his response was, "Isn't that annoying? I think it should be the mathematical symbol for sigma, which looks like an E. I've been fighting that for weeks." (The sigma (Σ) stands for summation.) Others used varying adjectives to describe the title. The TV site Zap2it.com called it "their typographical silliness, not ours". Brad Aspey of The Muskegon Chronicle, stated, "No, that wasn't an ugly typo you just read - 'NUMB3RS' (pronounced numbers) is the idiosyncratic title of filmmakers Ridley and Tony Scott's astute and crafty psychological drama which shows that even math can make for edge-of-your-seat entertainment." Ellen Gray of The Philadelphia Daily News, said, "Some of you may have noticed that in promoting 'Numb3rs,' which premieres Sunday before moving to its regular 10 p.m. Friday slot, CBS has chosen to put a 3 in place of the 'e' in the title....I won't be going along with this particular affectation, which slows down my typing and seems to be the graphic equivalent of the reversed 'R' in Toys R Us. So there."

Still others had a more positive view of the title. When NPR's Flatow asked both Lorden and Dr. Keith Devlin, NPR's mathematics reporter, about the title, both men denied creating the title; Devlin believed that executive producer Tony Scott originated the title. Lorden stated that he initially thought that the title was "kind of hokey", but later saw it as "brilliant" and a "catchy logo". Jonathan Storm of The Philadelphia Inquirer, in his review of the series stated, "You'd think CBS's new Numbers, which premieres at 10 tonight after the Patriots–Steelers football game, is just another one of those shows with numskull titles trying to draw attention to themselves. But the '3' substituting for the 'e' is actually based on a real thing".... He later said that the show was "written by people familiar with the Dead Cow Cult". David Brooks of The Telegraph (Nashua, NH) devoted the majority of his entire review to the use of leet in the series title. In addition, three psychologists, Manuel Perea, Jon Andoni Duñabeitia, and Manuel Carreiras mentioned the television series in their 2008 article for the American Psychological Association's Journal of Experimental Psychology: Human Perception and Performance.

=== American television ratings ===
Seasonal rankings (based on average total viewers per episode) of Numb3rs on CBS.

Note: Each U.S. network television season starts in late September and ends in late May, which coincides with the completion of May sweeps.

| Season | Timeslot | Season premiere | Season finale | Episodes | TV season | Ranking | Viewers (in millions) |
|---|---|---|---|---|---|---|---|
| 1st | Friday 10:00 PM | January 23, 2005 | May 13, 2005 | 13 | 2004–2005 | #36 | 10.77 |
| 2nd | Friday 10:00 PM | September 23, 2005 | May 19, 2006 | 24 | 2005–2006 | #32 | 11.62 |
| 3rd | Friday 10:00 PM | September 22, 2006 | May 18, 2007 | 24 | 2006–2007 | #38 | 10.5 |
| 4th | Friday 10:00 PM | September 28, 2007 | May 16, 2008 | 18 | 2007–2008 | #55 | 9.14 |
| 5th | Friday 10:00 PM | October 3, 2008 | May 15, 2009 | 23 | 2008–2009 | #37 | 10.29 |
| 6th | Friday 10:00 PM | September 25, 2009 | March 12, 2010 | 16 | 2009–2010 | #46 | 8.45 |

- Note: The pilot episode aired on Sunday before moving to its regular night on Friday.

== International broadcasting ==
Australia: Network Ten

Austria: Paramount Network

Spain: Calle 13

Netherlands: NET 5

Denmark: 13th Street

France: Universal Channel, M6, 6ter, RTL TVL

India: AXN

Japan: Fox Crime

Poland: Hallmark Channel

South Africa: Universal TV

Italy: Rai 4

Hungary: Viasat3

Russia: Universal Channel

Brazil: Telecine Action, A&E

Portugal: Fox Crime, Fox Life
