= Navi Rawat =

American actress (born 1977)

- Born: Navlata Rawat; June 5, 1977 (age 49); Malibu, California, U.S.
- Education: New York University
- Occupation: Actress
- Years active: 2000–2018 (as actress)
- Spouse: Brawley Nolte (m. 2012)
- Children: 1
- Relatives: Prem Rawat (uncle); Satpal Rawat (uncle); Hans Rawat (grandfather); Nick Nolte (father-in-law)

Navlata Rawat (born June 5, 1977) is an American former television and film actress, known for her roles as Theresa Diaz on the drama series The O.C. and math prodigy Amita Ramanujan on the drama series Numb3rs.

== Early life ==
Rawat was born in Malibu, California to Claudia (née Littmann) and Rajaji Rawat. Her maternal grandfather was Gerhard Littmann, the President of Police (Polizeipräsident) of Frankfurt. She was raised in Miami, Florida. She attended Miami Country Day School and is a graduate of New York University's Tisch School of the Arts.

== Career ==
In television, Rawat is best known for her roles as Theresa Diaz on the drama The O.C. and math prodigy Amita Ramanujan on Numb3rs. She had a guest role as Melanie in the first season of 24. Her work in film includes the science-fiction Thoughtcrimes (2003), the Project Greenlight film Feast (2005), and the independent romantic comedy Loveless in Los Angeles (2006). She has also had many smaller roles including Dana, a psychotic vampire slayer, in an episode of Angel and Nat Raiden on the episode "Asslane" of the short-lived action TV show, Fastlane on Fox. She played a recurring role in the USA Network series Burn Notice's fourth season. Most recently, she had a guest role on the rebooted Magnum P.I. series.

She was the spokeswoman for Moen faucets and narrated many of their commercials.

== Personal life ==
Rawat previously dated actor Jeremy Sisto. She married actor Brawley Nolte, son of Nick Nolte, in September 2012 on the island of Tahiti. They have one daughter.

== Filmography ==
| Year | Title | Role | Episodes |
|---|---|---|---|
| 2000 | Popular | Teen Girl #5 | Episode: "Booty Camp" |
| 2001 | Jack the Dog | Ruby | |
| 2001 | The Princess and the Marine | Sabika | Television film |
| 2002 | Roswell | Shelby | Episode: "Samuel Rising" |
| 2002 | 24 | Melanie | 6 episodes |
| 2002 | Dancing at the Harvest Moon | Jennifer | Television film |
| 2003 | The Street Lawyer | Sofia | Television film |
| 2003 | Fastlane | Natalie "Nat" Raiden | Episode: "Asslane" |
| 2003 | Thoughtcrimes | Freya McAllister | Television film |
| 2003 | House of Sand and Fog | Soraya Behrani | |
| 2003–2006 | The O.C. | Theresa Diaz | 13 episodes |
| 2004 | Angel | Dana | Episode: "Damage" |
| 2004 | Without a Trace | Ms. Tompkeller | Episode: "Light Years" |
| 2005–2010 | Numb3rs | Amita Ramanujan | 99 episodes |
| 2005 | Tom 51 | Chandi Azu | |
| 2005 | The Adventures of Big Handsome Guy and His Little Friend | Ethnic Woman | |
| 2005 | Project Greenlight | Herself | Season 3 |
| 2005 | Feast | Heroine | |
| 2007 | Undead or Alive | Sue | |
| 2007 | Loveless in Los Angeles | Gwen | |
| 2007 | Ocean of Pearls | Smita Sethi | |
| 2009 | Tom Cool | Chandi Azu | |
| 2009 | Inside the Box | Tanya | Television film |
| 2009 | FlashForward | Maya | Episode: "Gimme Some Truth" |
| 2010 | Castle | Rachel Walters | Episode: "Wrapped Up in Death" |
| 2010 | Burn Notice | Kendra | 3 episodes |
| 2012 | Lauren | Capt. Masters | 2 episodes |
| 2012 | The Collection | Lisa O'Brien | |
| 2012 | Grey's Anatomy | Heidi | Episode: "Walking on a Dream" |
| 2013 | Justified | Gina | Episode: "This Bird Has Flown" |
| 2014 | The Lachrymist | Savitri Parwana-Lewis | Short film (24 minutes) |
| 2018 | Magnum P.I. | Isabelle Simpson | Episode: "The Cat Who Cried Wolf" |
