= Alan Eppes =

- Numb3rs character
- First appearance: "Pilot"
- Last appearance: "Cause and Effect"
- Portrayed by: Judd Hirsch

In-universe information
- Gender: Male
- Occupation: Former city planner
- Family: Amita Ramanujan (daughter-in-law)
- Spouses: Margaret Mann-Eppes (wife, deceased)
- Children: Don Eppes (son); Charlie Eppes (son)

Alan Eppes is a fictional character in the CBS crime drama Numb3rs, played by Judd Hirsch. Alan is the father of the main characters, brothers Charlie and Don Eppes. First introduced in the pilot episode, the character of Alan received mixed reviews.

== Evolution over the series ==
Alan Eppes is the amiable and kind father of Charlie and Don Eppes, and is particularly protective of his younger son, Charlie. He is a widower and retired city planner, and in "Waste Not", Charlie refers to him as an engineer. He keeps busy by getting involved in the personal lives and careers of his sons as well as volunteering for causes he believes in. It makes him proud to see his competitive sons working together. He knows their best friends and colleagues, most of whom address him respectfully as "Mr Eppes". Also in Season 2, in episode "Protest", Eppes reveals that he was also an anti-war activist thirty-five years ago, alongside Matthew "Matt" Stirling, the leader of the movement and accused in the ROTC center bombing. Don's superior in the FBI also reveals Alan was a "Leader" Eppes, involved in anti-national activities, which Alan vehemently denies.

Alan worries about his sons being able to settle down and have a family, especially given their problems in maintaining relationships with women for extended periods of time. Recently he had been on his first date since his wife's death, with a caterer he was fond of, and has once more taken up work, investing in a consulting firm with Stan Fisher, which is related to "all his years in urban infrastructure."

He has been dating Dr. Mildred "Millie" Finch, Chair of the CalSci Physics, Mathematics, and Astronomy Division. When he is being sued by neighboring residents of a tennis court because of its disruptive lighting he designed, the relationship proves invaluable as Alan even overcomes the problem involving his new job venture with the aid of Millie, who helps Alan to discover that he is blameless. She also notes where Charlie gets his interest in numbers after overlooking Alan's engineering analysis of the lighting system ("End of Watch"). He later makes a bet with her whether they can go without consumer products.

For much of the first two seasons, his wife's name was never mentioned in the show, though she was referred to on the set as Margaret. He met Margaret when she was working for a tenants' rights organization and he was working for a housing developer. They had been married for thirty-five years and their marriage was a happy one, though they hid marital tension from their children. Alan held onto his wife's clothes, which he hid in the garage, despite Don helping him pack it six months before. When Charlie showed concern, he told him it was none of his business. Don confronted him as well, but both were criticized for giving advice as unmarried men and Mr. Eppes finally decided to get rid of the clothing on his own. After Charlie found a musical composition for the piano by his mother under her maiden name, Margaret Mann, in the Eppes garage, Alan revealed to his sons their mother's talent with classical music and her training in Vienna. He was astonished when his son noticed that some of her other compositions were dated after the birth of their children as he thought she had put her music work aside for her law career to help the family. Alan has seen his wife (JoBeth Williams) in a dream at the same time as Charlie.

Alan volunteered his son's house for Valerie Eng's (a girl Don and Charlie both liked during high school) wedding, toiled over coordinating every detail, and assigned the seating arrangement to Charlie, who created a mathematical algorithm for it, though Charlie didn't overall seem too enthusiastic about it. He claimed that since he never had a daughter, this would be his chance to make amends.

Alan has considered moving out of his son's house in order to live alone (something he has not done in forty years) and accomplish things on his own, but was rather hesitant to tell Charlie. He was shocked when his son seemed fine with it. Don tried to persuade him to take a place next to a tennis court, as his elder son is fond of the game. Alan finally decided against moving, since he favors his sons' company over being alone. He wants a new staircase to his room. Moreover, he wants Charlie to be more responsible in maintaining the house and be able to have a family. After giving Charlie a hard time about his chores, he seemed to grasp Charlie's situation more fully after a comparison to Einstein's. More predicaments in his living arrangements are revealed when a break-in at his precious Craftsman home causes him grief ("Pandora's Box"). Initially he is agitated by Charlie's renovations to the home.

Like Don, he enjoys baseball. He has attempted to persuade Charlie to take up golf like him, delighted that he can at least teach his brilliant son something. He sometimes works on puzzles to occupy his time when not busy, continuing his wife's hobby and allowing time for conversing with Charlie's colleagues, Larry Fleinhardt and Amita Ramanujan, over pizza. He also enjoys an occasional game of chess with Larry and was surprised at his friend for his love interest in Megan Reeves and his nomadic lifestyle. Before he was with his wife he was often a "rail bird" at the horse races.

His recent involvement in his sons' lives has been extended to aiding the FBI more frequently with his expertise in urban planning ("Under Pressure") and traffic engineering ("Money for Nothing"). Don at first was averse to his father getting involved with his line of work, but Alan asked him to show more respect. He provides further help to Don with his knowledge of an elevator system in "Chinese Box".

Alan is auditing a mechanical engineering class at CalSci for fun, but Charlie is disappointed that he could not interest him in advanced mathematics after all these years ("Velocity"). Alan being on campus has Charlie note the similarity of the situation to that of Back to School. Being very busy, Charlie fails in helping to teach his father the engineering material, as all he does is solve the thermodynamic problem set from this class for him. Alan seems disappointed. Since then, Charlie has made notes to help him more later, and feels that this will make up for all the times missed with his father getting to help him with homework. On the other hand, Alan recalls all the dioramas he created with him.

At the beginning of season five, Alan encourages Charlie to fight for his clearance.

An old park that he and Margaret designed becomes scheduled to be torn down. Alan first begins to protest city hall's decision. After looking at the plans, Alan decides that the new park would be better. He later finds that CalSci has agreed to let him design a new mechanical engineering building.

He overhears a conversation between Don and Larry about Don going to temple. He later offers to help Don with the prayers.

David and Colby turn to Alan to referee an argument about the JFK assassination. Alan tells them that he and a group of friends decided to look into it but could not reach a decision themselves.

Alan forms a bond with his sons' girlfriends. First, Robin comes to the house to talk about her failing the victim after a jury fails to convict a murder suspect ("Guilt Trip"). Then, Amita tells him that she enjoys her times with Alan. They even briefly discuss whether Charlie would propose to her. Don entering the garage interrupts their conversation.

To satisfy a lab requirement, Alan looks for another lab class. Charlie and Larry agree to be his new lab bosses.

Amita and Larry ask Alan about joining their think tank. Charlie and Alan both initially oppose the idea, especially since Alan thought that he had taught Charlie everything he knows when Charlie was seven. Alan eventually agrees to join the think tank and enthusiastically participates.

When Don is stabbed, Alan goes and stays at the hospital. He sends Charlie back to work on the case, telling him that Don would want that. He comforts Robin and tells her about Don's birth. Later during one of Charlie's visits to see Don, Alan tells Charlie to set his priorities. Alan is present in Don's room when Don wakes up.

At the start of season six, while offering David a chance to vent any frustrations about his promotion, Alan hints at a change in his financial status. Later, he tells Charlie that he has lost money in his 401ks when his investment did not increase as promised by his investor. Charlie analyzes Alan's finances and realizes that Alan cannot use the remaining money to finance his retirement. He offers to help Alan financially, but Alan rebuffs. Don talks Alan into allowing Charlie's assistance. As a result, Alan decides to return to work and asks Charlie to teach him some new computer skills. He is hired by a design firm even without CAD capability. At the end of season six, Alan begins to search for apartments after Charlie and Amita's wedding. Charlie and Amita decide to convert the garage into a guesthouse so that he could live near them. He begins to design his new living space.

== Creation ==
Since the show featured brothers, Alan Eppes was created to discuss and show the brothers' family and their pasts. Len Cariou was originally cast as Alan. The believability of the family in terms of physical appearance and chemistry, however, created a need to recast the role. Judd Hirsch was cast as Alan in the second pilot.

== Reception ==
Early reception of Alan varied according to the audience in question. Some people believed that venturing into the personal life of law enforcement was unrealistic. In an interview with IGN.com’s Travis Fickett, creator/executive producer Cheryl Heuton said that, during the first season of the show, she told people that law enforcement officials having a home life is more realistic than constantly working on the crime. CBS executive Nina Tassler, however, liked the brothers going home to Alan.

Critically, the reception of Alan was mixed. Melanie McFarland, TV critic for the Seattle Post-Intelligencer, stated that Alan was not an individual character. Tim Goodman of the San Francisco Chronicle, however, said that Hirsch’s presence, although not having a large role in the pilot, “adds value”. Robert Bianco of USA Today stated that Alan was “a subdued, funnier version of his [Hirsch’s] meddling dad from Independence Day”.
