= Nicolas Falacci =

- Born: Massachusetts, U.S.
- Education: Tisch School of the Arts at New York University
- Occupations: Writer, producer
- Years active: 1981–present
- Known for: Numb3rs
- Spouse: Cheryl Heuton

Nicolas Falacci is a television writer and producer. Along with his wife and writing partner Cheryl Heuton, he co-created the television series Numb3rs (2005). Falacci and Heuton won the 2005 Carl Sagan Award for Public Understanding of Science award for the show's popularization of mathematics. Falacci also wrote the story and screenplay for the 1991 horror film Children of the Night, starring Karen Black and Peter DeLuise.

== Filmography ==
- Children of the Night (1991), writer
- Numb3rs (2005), writer and producer
- The Arrangement (2013), writer and producer
