= Don Eppes =

Donald Eppes
- Numb3rs character
- Rob Morrow as Don Eppes in a promotional photo for Numb3rs.
- First appearance: "Pilot"
- Last appearance: "Cause and Effect"
- Portrayed by: Rob Morrow

In-universe information
- Gender: Male
- Occupation: FBI Special Agent
- Family: Alan Eppes (father); Charlie Eppes (brother); Margaret Mann-Eppes (mother, deceased); Amita Ramanujan (sister-in-law)
- Significant other: Robin Brooks (fiancée)

Donald "Don" Eppes is a fictional character and one of the protagonists of the CBS crime drama Numbers. He is portrayed by Rob Morrow.

Don is an FBI Special Agent who runs the FBI Violent Crimes Squad in Los Angeles. Don recruits his mathematical genius brother, Charlie Eppes, to help him and the Bureau solve some of their most difficult cases. Don makes great sacrifices in his personal life in order to devote himself to his career, which to him is more of a way of life than a mere job. More important to him than his work is his family, especially Charlie, even though he doesn't understand his brother's way of looking at the world.

== Backstory ==
Don is the older son of Alan Eppes and Margaret Mann-Eppes. He was raised in a secular Jewish family. During the Vietnam War, his parents would take him to sit-ins, and he twice watched his father be arrested (as mentioned in the episode "Protest"). When Don became too attached to his toy gun, his parents put him in Little League, hoping Don would forget his love for guns. Don graduated high school on the same day as his younger brother Charlie, who is five years younger ("Soft Target"). He went to college on a baseball scholarship and then played Single-A with the Stockton Rangers (a fictional team) as a utility player. Charlie used to predict the number of walks he would get just from his stance at the plate. Despite the attraction, Don never took steroids, although his backup player did. That player made the major leagues and Don has since wondered if he should have taken steroids to help improve his game. The day after realizing that he would never be better than a single A player, Don quit the Rangers and signed up for the FBI entrance exam ("Identity Crisis").

In the FBI Academy, he dated fellow agent Terry Lake. As he later told his father, his favorite date ever was when he had pizza in a laundromat with her. Terry does not share that opinion. After graduating from the Academy, Don worked in Fugitive Recovery with Billy Cooper (episode "Man Hunt") and former Navy SEAL Petey Fox ("Friendly Fire") and was very good at it. He taught at the FBI Academy for a time after Fugitive Recovery to help him come back to civilization ("Longshot"). After that, he worked in the field office in Albuquerque, New Mexico, and dated Kim Hall (Sarah Wayne Callies), and nearly married her.

Don gave up his position as Special Agent in Charge of the Albuquerque FBI office to move back to L.A. when his mother became ill with cancer, from which she eventually died.

== Characterization ==
Don is a principled character and very devoted to his job, leaving him not much time for a social life. According to actor Rob Morrow, Don has a tendency to sacrifice, even at the expense of what he wants from life. He enjoys the occasional game of baseball and is also often seen watching ice hockey, which he played in his youth. He went to college on a baseball scholarship. Don thought baseball was his first love, though his father Alan Eppes reminded him that a toy gun and playing a cop as a child was actually his first love, and comforted him in noticing that the FBI needs utility players. Charlie said that he was a "born cop." Don's giving up on the game is an emotional subject for him.

He and Charlie have had their differences over the years, and Don finds it hard to go to Charlie for help to do his job. In fact, in "One Hour" Don states that he does not like living in the shadow of his genius brother, though he respects him and his abilities very much and they have become closer. Sometimes, he feels that Charlie isn't doing all the great things he could be doing because he is working with the FBI. Still, he does often question his brother only to have his faith in Charlie's abilities restored. In "Burn Rate", their father says, "But have you ever known your brother to let his emotions trump his math?" Just because Don gets emotional, he thought this was the case with Charlie and even stated his brother was backing one of his own. In "Trust Metric", Charlie says that he has a giant ego.

He is a harsh taskmaster, likes being the boss, and is not very forgiving. One of his former tactical trainees from Quantico, Liz Warner has proclaimed to this and, after Colby confided in her that he made a mistake, she told him that the very fact that he still remains on Don's team means something. She also said that Don never spoke of his personal life while at the FBI Academy and was at the time fresh from the field in hunting fugitives (with friend Agent Cooper). Liz knows he has mellowed with age and he can hold a commitment with a woman for longer periods of time.

He believes that the death penalty is a form of revenge and has an ability to understand how criminals think, which causes him to suppress his thoughts in an effort to cope with the horrors that he sees on his job.

== Evolution over the series ==
Having been Special Agent In Charge of the Albuquerque Office, Don took a demotion in order to obtain a position as Special Agent in the L.A. Field Office, but he did so to be with his family when his mother was diagnosed with cancer two years prior to the series pilot. Margaret Eppes died approximately one year later, and according to the pilot, Don elicited Charlie's help on two cases between her death and the series pilot. These cases involved IRS extortion and stock fraud. Initially uncertain about what Charlie might actually be able to contribute, he reluctantly allows Charlie to assist with their attempts to track down a rapist and is pleasantly surprised when Charlie's math leads to the suspect's apprehension ("Pilot").

His relationship with Charlie was apparently somewhat strained even before their mother's death, as Don is stunned to learn that his little brother has enough security clearance to work with both the CDC and the NSA ("Vector").

Since the beginning of season 6, there are signs that Don becomes fragile and more hesitant. His chase toward a runaway sniper in season premiere and his hunt to a rogue agent in episode 2 are not as quick and overwhelming in previous seasons. He also admits that the stabbing really shocked him, meaning that he has more concern on his safety now. Although, he admits he has a "lost a step" to his father, not remembering when he has beaten David or Colby in a sprint, he is quick enough to kill his old, tough FBI pal Pete "Petey" Fox, who is an expert in a gunfight and has fallen to the wrong side of the law. He grieves the loss of his adrenaline-chasing friend. In response to a mid-life crisis sparked by his stabbing and the loss of Petey, Don buys a motorcycle. Midway through season six, he proposes to Robin. She gets cold feet, stating that she felt he is still in the middle of significant changes in his life. However, she tells him she will accept his proposal when he finds what he wants from life. In the sixth-season finale, Don is at peace with himself after recovering his Glock and takes a head FBI position. He promises to remain close with Charlie, and re-proposes to Robin, which she accepts.

== Creation ==
Don Eppes was created as Charlie's brother and as a link to the procedural part of the show. Gabriel Macht originally was cast as Don Eppes in the original pilot of Numb3rs. The believability of the family in terms of physical appearance and chemistry, however, created a need to recast the role. Rob Morrow replaced Macht when Macht left the show. At this point in development, Don was rewritten to be more intellectual than he was in the original pilot. To prepare for his role as Don Eppes, Morrow did some training with the FBI as well as reading about and talking to real-life police officers.

== Reception ==
Early critical reception of Don was mixed. Gillian Flynn of Entertainment Weekly said that Morrow's performance was “with full CSI-inspired stoicism”. Melanie McFarland, TV critic for the Seattle Post-Intelligencer, stated that Don was not an original character as of the pilot. Tim Goodman of the San Francisco Chronicle, however, called Morrow, as Don, “likable”. Robert Bianco of USA Today stated that, although Don did not come across as an obvious choice of role for Morrow, Morrow was excellent as Don.

Since then, Don has been more widely accepted. Morrow is now as recognized for his role as Don Eppes as he is for his role in Northern Exposure. In a public service announcement, Morrow congratulated the Federal Bureau of Investigation on their 100th anniversary. With 53 percent of the votes, Don took first place in the category of "Sexiest FBI Agent" in TV Guide's poll.
