= Cheryl Heuton =

American television writer and producer

Cheryl Heuton is an American television writer and producer. Along with her husband and writing partner Nicolas Falacci, she co-created the television series Numb3rs (2005–2010). The couple created the show, a mathematics-centered departure from standard-fare Hollywood programming, to combat anti-intellectualism. Falacci and Heuton were awarded the Carl Sagan Award for Public Understanding of Science in 2005 and, with Numb3rs, the National Science Board's Public Service Award in 2007. Heuton and Falacci also co-wrote the TV movie The Arrangement (2013), an adaptation of Elmore Leonard’s story “When the Women Come Out to Dance.”

== Early life and education ==
Cheryl Heuton grew up in northern San Diego County. She credits her pro-science and pro-mathematics outlook (later demonstrated in her work on Numb3rs) to her upbringing in a “community that had a lot of professors from UCSD in it, and … an early exposure to a lot of science and thinking.”

Heuton also credits her family's membership in the Unitarian Church, “which is home to many people who don’t believe in traditional religion. And there were a lot of university professors there. And I just remember early on kind of thinking that things could be thought through more readily than just believing everything that gets said to you. You have the ability to just think logically about something to reason things out, and so many people didn’t do that. They would just sort of kind of go along with whatever was the belief that their group had. And I think … my group belief from that kind of upbringing was not to think that way.”

Carl Sagan was an important influence on Heuton and she identifies as a skeptic.

Heuton attended the University of California, San Diego, and studied literature.

== Career ==
Heuton was a newspaper journalist and editor in southern California before turning to television work. Her first newspaper job, at age 22, was with the Del Mar News-Press. Heuton later worked for the Blade-Tribune and the Escondido Times-Advocate.

Heuton and Nick Falacci created, wrote, and co-produced the television series Numb3rs. Numb3rs was broadcast on CBS for six seasons, from 2005 to 2010, and featured a mathematician entertainingly explaining mathematical concepts while helping the FBI solve crimes. The Caltech campus was used for many scenes, but was called California Institute of Science (or CalSci) in the show for legal reasons. Heuton and Fallacci strove to ensure that the math presented in the series was real by hiring mathematicians as consultants. Heuton said, “We just want people to better understand the world they live in.”

Heuton and Falacci co-wrote the television movie The Arrangement (2013), a drama involving a Colombian woman living in Miami, distributed by USA Network. The movie is based on Elmore Leonard’s story “When the Women Come Out to Dance.”

== Awards ==
In 2005, Heuton and Fallacci were awarded the Carl Sagan Award for Public Understanding of Science by the Council of Scientific Society Presidents for being “widely recognized magnifiers of the public′s understanding of science” due to their work on the television series Numb3rs.

In 2007, Heuton and Fallacci and the television series Numb3rs shared the National Science Board's Public Service Award for “contributions toward increasing scientific and mathematical literacy on a broad scale”.

== Personal life ==
Heuton met her husband, Nick Falacci, in Topanga Canyon (California) in 1990 while rock climbing. They married in 1991 and moved to New York.
