= Numbers season 4 =

Season of American television series

Numbers
- Season 4
- DVD cover
- No. of episodes: 18

Release
- Original network: CBS
- Original release: September 28, 2007 – May 16, 2008

Season chronology
- ← Previous; Season 3 Next → Season 5

The fourth season of Numbers, an American television series, first aired on September 28, 2007 and ended on May 16, 2008. Because of the Writers Guild of America strike, only 12 episodes were initially produced for this season. Following the end of the strike, six more were announced.

== Cast ==
=== Main ===
- Rob Morrow as Don Eppes
- David Krumholtz as Charlie Eppes
- Judd Hirsch as Alan Eppes
- Alimi Ballard as David Sinclair
- Peter MacNicol as Larry Fleinhardt
- Navi Rawat as Amita Ramanujan
- Diane Farr as Megan Reeves
- Dylan Bruno as Colby Granger

=== Recurring ===
- Aya Sumika as Liz Warner
- Will Patton as Lt. Gary Walker
- Michelle Nolden as AUSA Robin Brooks
- Leslie Silva as M.E. Ridenhour

=== Guest ===
- Val Kilmer as Mason Lancer
- Chris Bauer as Ray Galuski
- Graham McTavish as John Corcoran
- Yancey Arias as DJ Rodriguez
- Erika Alexander as U.S. Marshal Tricia Yaegger
- Kevin G. Schmidt as Steven Wexford
- Peter Onorati as Alfred McGurn
- Sean Patrick Flanery as Jeff Upchurch
- Ari Graynor as Ella Pierce
- William Atherton as Warren Pierce
- Ben Feldman as Seth Marlowe
- Wil Wheaton as Miles Sklar
- Christopher Lloyd as Ross Moore
- Clifton Powell as Max Devane
- Chris Bruno as Tim King
- Enrico Colantoni as Ben Blakely
- Megan Gallagher as Sarah Blakely
- Aunjanue Ellis as Ivy Kirk
- Julie Dretzin as Karen Griffiths
- Andrea Anders as Rena Vining
- Jill Eikenberry as Susan Doran
- Steven R. McQueen as Craig Ezra
- Gabrielle Christian as Audrey Doran
- Susan Kelechi Watson as Nina Hunter
- Dorian Missick as Derek Raines
- Zeljko Ivanek as William Fraley
- Ravi Kapoor as Phil Sanjrani
- Tiya Sircar as Shaza Rafiq

== Episodes ==
No. overall	No. in season	Title	Directed by	Written by	Original release date	Prod. code	US viewers (millions)
62	1	"Trust Metric"	Tony Scott	Ken Sanzel	September 28, 2007	401	9.38
Five weeks have passed since Colby Granger was exposed as a spy working for the Chinese government and after being captured and imprisoned, Colby escapes and along with friend and fellow spy Dwayne Carter race through the city, prompting Don and the team to join the search in hopes of recapturing the two men despite the team still struggling to come to terms with the devastating betrayal but all is not what it seems... Mathematics used: Trust metric, set covering deployment, heuristics and Illumination problem
63	2	"Hollywood Homicide"	Alexander Zakrzewski	Andy Dettmann	October 5, 2007	402	9.76
A girl turns up dead in a star's bathtub, leading the FBI team to uncover blackmail and murder while following his rescue, Colby rejoins the team. Mathematics used: Snell's law, Archimedes' principle and game theory
64	3	"Velocity"	Fred Keller	Nicolas Falacci & Cheryl Heuton	October 12, 2007	403	9.16
When a street race leads to a bad accident in which a man is killed, the FBI find links to a cold case. Mathematics used: Angular momentum, centripetal force, conservation laws and Newton's laws of motion
65	4	"Thirteen"	Ralph Hemecker	Don McGill	October 19, 2007	404	9.85
The team is on the trail of a serial killer who tortures his victims the way the 12 apostles died. A Cal Sci Religious Studies professor is brought in to explain the history and the numerology, which Charlie refuses to accept. Mathematics used: Fibonacci coding. See also: Numerology and Hebrew numerology
66	5	"Robin Hood"	J. Miller Tobin	Robert Port	October 26, 2007	405	9.70
A private bank with several suspicious customers is broken into, prompting the team to investigate while David and Colby get their "groove" back as Charlie and Amita discuss her father's reaction to her dating a non-Indian. Mathematics used: Listing's law, projectile motion and dating system "Note": The song playing at the beginning of the episode is "Spring and by Summer Fall" by Blonde Redhead.
67	6	"In Security"	Stephen Gyllenhaal	Sean Crouch	November 2, 2007	406	9.34
A woman in witness protection is killed after going to dinner with Don. The lead suspect is also in witness protection. Charlie's book is released. Mathematics used: CART Analysis, Regression Analysis and Path Analysis
68	7	"Primacy"	Chris Hartwill	Julie Hébert	November 9, 2007	407	9.94
A man is killed while playing an alternate reality game. Amita, a longtime player of the MMORPG side of the game gets put in danger when the killer sees her as his only opponent. Charlie does a TV interview about his book. Charlie asks Amita to move in with him. Mathematics used: Evolutionary algorithm
69	8	"Tabu"	Alex Zakrzewski	Sekou Hamilton	November 16, 2007	408	10.26
A big businessman's daughter is kidnapped, but the whole game changes when he refuses to play along with the kidnappers. Megan deals with her issues with her father again. Mathematics used: Tabu search, minimax and Bayesian priors
70	9	"Graphic"	John Behring	Nicolas Falacci & Cheryl Heuton	November 23, 2007	409	10.12
A comic-book convention becomes a crime scene when a deadly robbery leads to the disappearance of an extremely rare comic book. Mathematics used: Fractal Dimension Analysis, auction Theory and "Wrinkliness" (Detection of Handwriting Forgery)
71	10	"Chinese Box"	Dennis Smith	Ken Sanzel	December 14, 2007	410	9.75
A paranoid gunman shoots an FBI agent at the FBI headquarters, then shuts himself and David in an elevator. Liz is leaving for a few weeks on a narcotics job. Mathematics used: Chinese room, "Chomp" and cluster analysis
72	11	"Breaking Point"	Craig Ross, Jr.	Andrew Dettman	January 11, 2008	411	9.81
An investigative reporter goes missing while Charlie finds that his life is in danger after he tries to help Don and the team solve the case. Mathematics used: Regression Analysis
73	12	"Power"	Julie Hébert	Julie Hébert	January 18, 2008	412	10.08
Don and the team track down an officer who has turned into a serial rapist. Mathematics used: Network theory and set theory
74	13	"Black Swan"	John Behring	Ken Sanzel	April 4, 2008	413	10.00
The team takes down an inner-city meth lab, and while on the bust they also arrest a bystander who is discovered to have guns and other suspicious items in the back of his van. Mathematics used: Floyd-Warshall algorithm, Dirichlet tessellation, brute force and time series. See also: Black swan theory.
75	14	"Checkmate"	Stephen Gyllenhaal	Robert Port	April 11, 2008	414	9.54
Don's old flame returns to California to prosecute an incarcerated criminal kingpin who seems to be ordering assassinations from within the prison. Don and the team find themselves in a race against time to convince a teenage chess genius who may be the clue into finding how the orders are being sent. Mathematics used: supervised multiclass labeling, paper folding, diamond cut, chess and algebraic chess notation
76	15	"End Game"	Dennis Smith	Don McGill	April 25, 2008	415	9.64
Don and his team hunt for an ex-Marine (Sharif Atkins) wanted for murder, while the ex-Marine's family is kidnapped. Mathematics used: OODA Loop and decision theory
77	16	"Atomic No. 33"	Leslie Libman	Sean Crouch	May 2, 2008	416	10.33
A cult is poisoned with arsenic, but refuses medical help. Their new leader is trying to change that and other things about his church. When they find that the old leader was also poisoned with arsenic, the mystery gets deeper. Mathematics used: Bayesian network analysis, Non-Newtonian fluid, social network analysis, affinity analysis and K-optimal pattern discovery
78	17	"Pay to Play"	Alex Zakrzewski	Steve Cohen & Andrew Dettman	May 9, 2008	417	9.33
A rapper is killed after a celebration thrown by the record label. Megan is taking some time off and Charlie finally meets Amita's parents. Mathematics used: String metric and Gröbner basis
79	18	"When Worlds Collide"	John Behring	Nicolas Falacci & Cheryl Heuton	May 16, 2008	418	9.78
Charlie and the FBI have their differences about a Pakistani charity group suspected of funding terrorism. Final appearance of: Diane Farr as Megan Reeves Mathematics used: Byzantine fault tolerance, Figure-Ground, Wallpaper group, M. C. Escher, Hyperbolic geometry and Six degrees of separation
