= Numbers season 3 =

Numbers
- Season 3
- DVD cover
- No. of episodes: 24

Release
- Original network: CBS
- Original release: September 22, 2006 – May 18, 2007

Season chronology
- ← Previous; Season 2 Next → Season 4

The third season of Numbers, an American television series, premiered on September 22, 2006, with the episode "Spree" and had its season finale "The Janus List" on May 18, 2007. Charlie and Amita intensify their relationship, as do Larry and Megan. Amita has troubles adjusting in her new role as a CalSci professor, and Larry announces his leave of absence—he will be on the space station for six months, which greatly distresses Charlie. Dr. Mildred Finch, the newly appointed Chair of the CalSci Physics, Mathematics, and Astronomy Division, initially troubles Charlie and his colleagues, as Alan dates her. Don dates Agent Liz Warner, questions his ethics and self-worth, and receives counseling. Charlie sees Don's therapist and the two understand one another more. Alan engages in some FBI consulting with his knowledge of engineering, and Larry returns from the space station, although disillusioned. The finale wraps up with a revelation that shakes the whole team.

== Cast ==
=== Main ===
- Rob Morrow as Don Eppes
- David Krumholtz as Charlie Eppes
- Judd Hirsch as Alan Eppes
- Alimi Ballard as David Sinclair
- Navi Rawat as Amita Ramanujan
- Diane Farr as Megan Reeves
- Dylan Bruno as Colby Granger
- Peter MacNicol as Larry Fleinhardt

=== Recurring ===
- Aya Sumika as Liz Warner
- Lou Diamond Phillips as Ian Edgerton
- Kathy Najimy as Dr. Mildred "Millie" Finch
- Jay Baruchel as Oswald Kittner
- Michelle Nolden as AUSA Robin Brooks
- Will Patton as Lt. Gary Walker
- Wendell Pierce as William Bradford

=== Guest ===
- Shawn Hatosy as Dwayne Carter
- David Gallagher as Buck Winters
- Kim Dickens as Crystal Hoyle
- Benito Martinez as Arthur Ruiz
- Scott Menville as Tyler
- Michelle Lee as Michelle Kim
- Rachel York as Marla Kinkirk
- Cleo King as Unemployment office worker
- Amy Sloan as Kari Syles
- Bill Nye as Bill Waldie
- Lauren Velez as Claudia Gomez
- Deirdre Lovejoy as Daria Samson
- Erica Gimpel as Principal Riva Bell
- Tom Amandes as Lawrence Dryden
- Robin Weigert as Elaine Tillman
- George Newbern as Brendan McCrary
- Jason Beghe as Reid Sarasin
- Tito Ortiz as Tino Alva
- Bruce McGill as Austin
- Michael DeLorenzo as Nacio Duque
- William Sadler as J. Everett Tuttle
- Jama Williamson as Jane Aliano
- Geoff Pierson as CEO Aaron Helm
- Erin Cottrell as Caroline Williams
- Lisa Vidal as Jessica Malloy
- Jeremy Sisto as AUSA Alvin Brickle
- Catherine Dent as Naomi Vaughn

== Episodes ==
No. overall	No. in season	Title	Directed by	Written by	Original release date	Prod. code	US viewers (millions)
38	1	"Spree"	John Behring	Ken Sanzel	September 22, 2006	301	11.35
Don is on the trail of a criminal couple consisting of a 30-year-old teacher Crystal Hoyle (Kim Dickens) and her 17-year-student Buck Winters (David Gallagher) who are committing crimes across the country. Charlie and Amita's relationship changes and Alan decides to move out. The episode ends in a cliffhanger with Hoyle (Kim Dickens), the 30-year-old teacher, taking Megan hostage. Lou Diamond Phillips appears again as Agent Ian Edgerton. The first of a two-episode story, followed by Two Daughters. Mathematics used: Pursuit curves and geodesic sphere
39	2	"Two Daughters"	Alex Zakrzewski	Ken Sanzel	September 29, 2006	302	10.69
The team jumps into action after learning that Crystal Hoyle (Kim Dickens) has taken Megan hostage and work against the clock and ever-decreasing odds to save Megan before it's too late. Sequel to Spree. Mathematics used: Polar spirals and parametric equations
40	3	"Provenance"	Dennis Smith	Don McGill	October 6, 2006	303	11.07
A famous Nazi-looted Camille Pissarro painting is stolen from a museum and a related murder surfaces. Gena Rowlands, Garret Dillahunt, Zach Grenier, Benito Martinez and Armin Shimerman guest star. Mathematics used: Linear diophantine equations, curvelet analysis, Craquelure and discriminant analysis
41	4	"The Mole"	Stephen Gyllenhaal	Robert Port	October 13, 2006	304	10.89
The death of a Chinese interpreter outside a nightclub who was knocked down and fatally injured by a car at first appears to be an accident but Charlie's theory later suggests that it was murder and the resulting investigation leads Don and his team to investigate a possible mole from within the Department of Justice. Colby covers up information on Don's case for a friend (Shawn Hatosy) and is left stunned when he finds evidence suggesting that his old friend is the mole that Don and the team are looking for. Charlie is upset when Larry publishes a paper without his help. Mathematics used: Steady Motion Algorithm, Curtate cycloid, symmetry and combinatorics
42	5	"Traffic"	J. Miller Tobin	Nicolas Falacci & Cheryl Heuton	October 20, 2006	305	11.95
A series of violent highway attacks which appear to be random leaves Don and his team deeply puzzled. Mathematics used: Randomness, partial differential equations and traffic flow
43	6	"Longshot"	John Behring	J. David Harden	October 27, 2006	306	11.09
The team investigates the death of a man armed with a sophisticated statistical analysis that can identify the winning horse at a race track. Philip Casnoff guest stars. First appearance of: Aya Sumika in the recurring role of FBI Agent Liz Warner. Mathematics used: Probability, arbitrage betting and data mining
44	7	"Blackout"	Scott Lautanen	Andrew Dettman	November 3, 2006	307	11.08
After an attack on a power station leaves parts of Los Angeles in the dark, the team must find the assailant's real target. Mathematics used: Set Theory, Center of mass, harmonic series, directed graph, Load flow analysis and Dantzig-Wolfe Decomposition
45	8	"Hardball"	Fred Keller	Nicolas Falacci & Cheryl Heuton	November 10, 2006	308	11.76
A minor league baseball player trying to get back to the majors is found dead of steroid abuse, leading the investigators to an unusual chain of suspects. Jay Baruchel portrays Oswald Kittner. Bill Nye makes his second appearance in the recurring role of Charlie's CalSci colleague engineering professor Bill Waldie. Jon Hamm also guest stars. Mathematics used: Sabermetrics and Shiryaev-Roberts change-point analysis
46	9	"Waste Not"	J. Miller Tobin	Julie Hébert	November 17, 2006	309	10.73
Mysterious cancer clusters are found around a number of elementary schools whose playgrounds were all paved by the same company. A new CalSci administrator (Kathy Najimy in her first appearance as recurring character Dr. Mildred Finch) annoys Charlie and his colleagues, while Alan dates her. Joshua Malina, Bob Gunton, Deirdre Lovejoy, and Erica Gimpel also guest star. Mathematics used: Groundwater flow equation, cancer clusters, seismic tomography and Kac–Moody algebra
47	10	"Brutus"	Oz Scott	Ken Sanzel	November 24, 2006	310	11.73
A California State Senator and a psychiatrist are murdered; neither have much in common with the other except for one thing...they both turn up dead on Don's watch. While the circumstances of their deaths are different, Don thinks the two murders are related, and tries to prove his hunch right. What he finds may bring to light a deep secret the government has been hiding for years. Tom Amandes guest stars. Mathematics used: Network flow, network theory, Euclid's Orchard and target selection theory
48	11	"Killer Chat"	Chris Hartwill	Don McGill	December 15, 2006	311	11.23
Don and Charlie track a killer who has murdered several sex predators. The predators took advantage of teenage girls they met in chat rooms. Meanwhile, Larry is ready to begin an adventure with NASA. Guest stars include Robin Weigert, and astronaut Buzz Aldrin as himself in a non-speaking cameo appearance. Mathematics used: Statistical Textual Analysis and principal components analysis
49	12	"Nine Wives"	Julie Hébert	Julie Hébert	January 5, 2007	312	12.35
Don, Charlie, and the team search for a polygamist who is on the FBI's Ten Most Wanted List for rape and murder. Guest stars include Teri Polo, Joshua Malina and Anne Dudek. Mathematics used: Lévy flights, Inbreeding coefficients and kinship chains
50	13	"Finders Keepers"	Colin Bucksey	Andrew Dettman	January 12, 2007	313	11.58
After an extremely expensive yacht sinks in the middle of a race, Charlie finds himself caught between a rock and a hard place when both Don and the NSA need his help on the case. David Clennon, Jason Beghe, and Titus Welliver guest star. Mathematics used: Fluid dynamics, constraint and optimization
51	14	"Take Out"	Leslie Libman	Sean Crouch	February 2, 2007	314	10.91
When two police officers are killed while eating dinner out, Charlie tries to figure out where the killers will strike next while Don's superiors make him see the department shrink (Wendell Pierce) to help him deal with the aftermath of the Crystal Hoyle Case. José Zúñiga guest stars. Mathematics used: Outliers and data mining
52	15	"End of Watch"	Michael Watkins	Robert Port & Mark Llewellyn	February 9, 2007	315	11.23
Don and the team reopen a cold case when a bunch of kids playing in an abandoned empty construction site discover a police badge. When Charlie joins the investigation, they attempt to track down the owner of the badge, a police officer who has been missing for seventeen years but when the team discover that the dead cop was on his way to Internal Affairs, the investigation takes a turn. Meanwhile, Alan is informed that he's being sued. Lance Reddick and Hassan Johnson guest star; Will Patton makes another appearance as LAPD officer Lt. Gary Walker. Mathematics used: Laser Swath Mapping and quantum mechanics
53	16	"Contenders"	Alex Zakrzewski	J. David Harden	February 16, 2007	316	10.69
One of David's closest friends is called into question after a man dies during a mixed martial arts sparring match. When it turns out that this is not the first time such an event has happened, things look even worse. Charlie is busy practicing what little he knows about poker, so he can take Larry's spot in a tournament. Steven Culp, Lauren Vélez, Bruce McGill and Arye Gross guest star. Mathematics used: Kruskal's algorithm and Flow network
54	17	"One Hour"	J. Miller Tobin	Ken Sanzel	February 23, 2007	317	11.02
Don talks to his departmental therapist (Wendell Pierce) again, and while he's gone, the team races against time to find an eleven-year-old boy being held hostage on a $3 million ransom. Vincent Laresca and Michael DeLorenzo also guest star. Mathematics used: 'Cake-cutting' algorithm, logic maze and state diagram
55	18	"Democracy"	Steve Boyum	Nicolas Falacci & Cheryl Heuton	March 9, 2007	318	10.29
Several area murders seem to be tied to voter fraud. Don, Charlie, and the team must find the killers before they strike again. Jay Baruchel and Joshua Malina again appear in recurring roles; William Sadler and Kelli O'Hara also guest star. Mathematics used: Statistics, probability theory, metadata and organizational theory
56	19	"Pandora's Box"	Dennis Smith	Andrew Black	March 30, 2007	319	10.74
When a jet crashes in the middle of a forest, Charlie suspects that there is more to the crash than meets the eye. Lou Diamond Phillips appears again as FBI tracker Agent Ian Edgerton; D.W. Moffett also guest stars. Mathematics used: Ito-Stratonovich drift integrals and wavelet deconvolution
57	20	"Burn Rate"	Frederick K. Keller	Don McGill	April 6, 2007	320	10.93
Don and Charlie hunt for a serial letter bomber and disagree over whether a key suspect, a physics professor (Matt Malloy) working as a consultant on explosives for the Department of Defense who eluded conviction once before, is responsible for the latest murder. Lisa Vidal and Kyle Howard also appear. Mathematics used: Explosions, paradigm shift, coherence and outliers
58	21	"The Art of Reckoning"	John Behring	Julie Hébert	April 27, 2007	321	10.15
When a former mob hit man on death row suddenly has a change of heart and agrees to confess to his crimes, Don has an uneasy feeling about the whole affair. Larry (Peter MacNicol) returns from his NASA mission. Jeremy Sisto, Wood Harris and Bruce MacVittie guest star. Kathy Najimy makes her final appearance of the season as Dr. Millie Finch. Mathematics used: Probability theory and tit for tat
59	22	"Under Pressure"	J. Miller Tobin	Andrew Dettman	May 4, 2007	322	9.51
Don, Charlie and the team take on an unknown group of terrorists who may be using nerve gas to undermine the city's water supply. James McDaniel and Erik Palladino guest star. Mathematics used: Social network analysis
60	23	"Money for Nothing"	Stephen Gyllenhaal	Nicolas Falacci & Cheryl Heuton	May 11, 2007	323	10.03
A truck loaded with medical relief supplies and $50 million cash is stolen, and someone other than the FBI wants to recover the hijacked shipment. Don and the team find themselves being pitted against blackmarketeers in a race for the supplies and cash. William Russ, Wendell Pierce, LisaGay Hamilton, and William Shockley guest star. Mathematics used: Greedy algorithm and Dijkstra's algorithm
61	24	"The Janus List"	John Behring	Robert Port & Ken Sanzel	May 18, 2007	324	10.18
In the wake of a deadly standoff with a mysterious, yet brilliant bomber, Don and Charlie discover that he was poisoned to keep him from exposing a secret while the team are left reeling and stunned after learning that one of their own is a traitor, a revelation that threatens to change the team forever... Martin Jarvis, Shawn Hatosy, and James Frain guest star. Mathematics used: Merkle-Hellman, Wheat and Chessboard Problem, straddling checkerboard, substitution cipher, Bacon's cipher, knapsack problem and Lorentz force
