= Trust Metric =

- Numbers episode
- Episode no.: Season 4 Episode 1
- Directed by: Tony Scott
- Written by: Ken Sanzel
- Production code: 401
- Original air date: September 28, 2007

Guest appearances
- Hector Hank as Guard #1; Shawn Hatosy as Dwayne Carter; Andre Ing as Shan; Val Kilmer as Mason Lancer; Gary Wilmes as Michael Kirkland

Episode chronology
← Previous "The Janus List"	Next → "Hollywood Homicide"
- Numbers season 4

"Trust Metric" is the season premiere of the fourth season of the American television show Numbers. Written by series writer Ken Sanzel, "Trust Metric" is set five weeks after the events in "The Janus List". In "Trust Metric"'s story, a Federal Bureau of Investigation (FBI) team attempts to find a pair of double agents, one of them a former teammate, who have escaped from prison. The story continues the events that began in "The Janus List".

The episode also marks the network television directorial debut of series executive producer and filmmaker Tony Scott. He made several changes to the sets, to the actors' hair, and to the filming of the episode. Because of Scott's involvement, Sanzel broke with the normal number of action scenes and included more scenes in the episode. Scott also brought in Val Kilmer as a guest star.

"Trust Metric" first aired in the United States on September 28, 2007. Critics gave the episode positive reviews. They especially liked the cinematic feel of the episode. A special feature on the Numb3rs season four DVDs highlight the filming of the episode.

== Plot summary ==
Five weeks have passed since the events in "The Janus List". FBI Special Agent Megan Reeves (Diane Farr) and her boyfriend, Dr. Larry Fleinhardt (Peter MacNicol), have been spending time at a Buddhist monastery. FBI Special Agent David Sinclair (Alimi Ballard), Dr. Charlie Eppes (David Krumholtz), and Dr. Amita Ramanujan (Navi Rawat) have continued with their lives. Charlie, an FBI math consultant, has returned to teaching full-time. Worrying their father Alan Eppes (Judd Hirsch), Charlie's brother, FBI Special Agent Don Eppes (Rob Morrow), spends the five weeks reviewing the tape of former FBI Special Agent Colby Granger (Dylan Bruno), who is currently serving time in prison on charges of espionage. Colby receives a visitor (Gary Wilmes) who gives Colby a key and hints that something will happen during Colby's transport to another facility. During transport, a gang begins a shootout with the agents transporting the prisoners, providing Colby and fellow inmate Dwayne Carter (Shawn Hatosy) with cover to escape. Meanwhile, back at Charlie's house, Don and Alan learn that Charlie is considering updating a paper on friendship math that he wrote as a 12-year-old. They and Amita then hear about Colby's escape on a television newscast.

At the scene, Don, David, and Megan find Colby's and Dwayne's handcuffs at a warehouse near the shootout/escape. Megan attempts to convince Don and David to discuss their feelings as the case is personal for them. David refuses, and Don states that he feels responsible for Colby. At the FBI office, Charlie realizes that he cannot determine the route that Colby and Dwayne are taking, so Charlie calls Larry for moral support. Using covering sets, Charlie, Amita, and Larry realize that Colby and Dwayne would flee to the subway system, and Don realizes that the accused spies would use the subway to avoid police. When Don confronts Dwayne and Colby at a subway stop, Dwayne tries to shoot Don. Colby stops Dwayne, and the pair escape onto a subway train.

Some time later, Colby makes two calls. One goes to voicemail, and the other is to Charlie and Don. Colby tells Don that Colby, since his training at the FBI Academy, has been a triple agent working with Michael Kirkland in the FBI's Counterintelligence Division to find a mole within the United States Department of Justice (DOJ). The team confirms Kirkland's existence and FBI work, as well as his visit with Colby, but finds Kirkland dead in a hotel room, leaving no way to confirm the rest of Colby's story. At the house, Don expresses regret about not firing at Colby, and Charlie tells Don that Don's belief in the goodness of people prevented Don from firing. At CalSci, Alan tells David, who has been looking for Charlie, to attempt to understand Colby's motives for his actions before ending David and Colby's friendship.

Meanwhile, Dwayne and Colby escape to a freighter. There, they find Mason Lancer (Val Kilmer), a United States attorney whose birth in Beijing, China, to American parents led him to spy for the Chinese. While revealing that Colby is indeed a triple agent, Lancer, who possesses some medical training, gives Colby two drugs to induce him to talk about the FBI's investigation into Lancer. At the FBI office, Charlie uses a trust metric to determine Colby's credibility. The rest of the team analyze NSA satellite photographs of the Port of Los Angeles to find Colby and Dwayne and find Lancer's SUV at the port. Charlie's trust metric reveals that they could trust Colby. After deciding against obtaining a search warrant due to the amount of time left before the freighter crossed into international waters, the team boards the freighter to rescue Colby. As the team boards, Lancer gives Colby an injection of potassium chloride, and Dwayne shoots Lancer. Dwayne is then killed by one of Lancer's men. Don and David find Colby unconscious and begin administering CPR.

At the hospital, Megan and David visit a recovering Colby. David refuses to enter Colby's room, feeling uncertain about his friend. Charlie, Don, Alan, and Larry celebrate the arrest at a restaurant. Over Don and Alan's objections, Charlie and Larry begin discussing the revision of Charlie's paper on friendship math.

== Production ==
=== Filming ===
"Trust Metric" marked Tony Scott's directorial debut on network television. Scott and series executive producer Ridley Scott wanted to direct an episode while between movies. Tony Scott wanted to direct "The Janus List" but felt that he could not do so properly due to his schedule. He told series producers to let him direct "Trust Metric".

Scott wanted to reinvent the show's effects. Specifically, Scott wanted to change the show's momentum and pace instead of maintaining the status quo. In order to maintain acting momentum, he did not leave actors much time between scenes. To capture more natural character moments, Scott refused to hold rehearsals and began filming as soon as the actors came on set. To give the title shot a new look, Skip Chaisson changed the color shot at the end of the scene to black and white. He then added a grainy appearance to the shot. Chaisson also used slo-mo and freeze-frame to increase the intensity of the storytelling.

He changed several sets for texture. Scott renovated the sets for the Eppes' living room and for Charlie's office, and he added a classroom set. At one point, he removed the wall and ceiling of the interrogation room's set to capture a specific camera angle.

Scott also asked everyone not to touch their hair so that he could give everyone a different look. Prior to Scott's arrival, series producers sent him a reel showing the actors' hair styles from the previous three seasons. He commented and made suggestions about the actors' hair.

"Trust Metric" took nine days to film, three days on set and six days on location. Numb3rs' location managers John Armstrong and Tony Rizza (location manager) and Scott's own location manager Janice Polley spent seven days finding locations to shoot the episode. The crew filmed a short arrest scene at the beginning of the episode at a real-life pool hall in North Hollywood.

Usually, Numb3rs had one action scene per episode. Due to Scott's desire to film the season four season premiere, writer Ken Sanzel included three action scenes. One was an ambush scene on a street, and one was aboard a freighter. Originally, the ambush scene was supposed to be a crash scene. While discussing the story, Sanzel and the producers realized that the crash would not meet their standards. Sanzel then changed the scene to a shootout/explosion. After obtaining approval from the California Highway Patrol and Caltrans, the crew filmed the ambush scene under I-10. The gang was instructed to shoot the car. Due to time constraints in the setup, special effects director Tom Bellissimo placed explosives on the armored car, which was totaled in the final explosion. The film crew used an Eyemo, a special type of camera that could easily be destroyed, to film the explosion.

For the harbor scenes, the crew spent one day filming dialogue and a second day filming the boarding of the freighter. Scott used a storyboard to outline how the scene would be filmed over the course of the day. In the freighter scene, four people became involved in a gunfight aboard the freighter. Due to the size of the boat, the risk for injury was increased. With filming occurring on a light day, the filming of the scene was better than what producers expected.

=== Casting ===
Tony Scott personally brought in several people to appear in the episode. Val Kilmer, who worked with director Tony Scott in Top Gun, was cast as US Attorney Mason Lancer. Scott personally called Kilmer and asked him to be in the episode. Continuing a trend that he had started in several of his previous films, Scott brought in several members of a real-life Vietnamese gang. He felt that the gang members' appearance and their real-life experiences added an authenticity that could not be replicated through makeup and acting. Numb3rs series aerial cameraman David Nowell was called in to play the FBI surveillance pilot as well as to film the episode. Nowell had previously worked with Scott in Top Gun.

=== Writing ===
"Trust Metric" resolved the plot started in "The Janus List". At the time, the only actor to know about the story arc's resolution was Dylan Bruno, whom producers informed during discussions about "The Janus List". "Trust Metric" also started a story arc in which Charlie becomes a best-selling author.

== Reception ==
Over 9.38 million people watched "Trust Metric". Critically, the episode was very well received. Lynn Elber of the AP News stated that, due to Scott's involvement in the episode, "Trust Metric" felt more like a film than a normal episode of the show. Jeffrey Robinson, a reviewer for DVD Talk, included "Trust Metric" in his list of highlighted episodes. Donald Liebenson, one of Amazon.com's editors, called "Trust Metric" "explosive" and "a Very Special Episode, complete with blazing action set pieces and even a Big Name Star (Val Kilmer!) right out of a Tony Scott blockbuster …".

== DVD notes ==
On the Numb3rs season four DVDs, the bonus feature "Crunching NUMB3RS: Trust Metric" addresses the production of the episode. The feature has five segments. The first segment, "Pre-Production", addresses Scott's and shows some clips of filming the pool hall and ambush scenes as well as a clip showing the planning of the freighter scene. "Tony's Touch" details casting and the changes made for the episode. Clips of the filming of the scene are interspersed with descriptions of how the scene was planned and shot in "The Ambush". In "The Freighter", the crew and actress Diane Farr describe how the freighter scene was filmed. The final segment, "Post-Production", features the changes made to the title. It also contains a segment of a special viewing at the Academy of Television Arts and Sciences on September 27, 2007. After the viewing, the cast, series co-creator/co-executive producer Cheryl Heuton, co-creator/co-executive producer Nicolas Falacci, and Sanzel participated in a panel.
