= Nine Wives =

- Numbers episode
- Episode no.: Season 3 Episode 12
- Directed by: Julie Hébert
- Written by: Julie Hébert
- Production code: 312
- Original air date: January 5, 2007

Guest appearances
- John Patrick Amedori as Lee Brady; W. Earl Brown as Abner Stone; Kyle Colerider-Krugh as Ralph Jackson; Anne Dudek as Emmanueline Kirtland; Paco Farias as Guy in Truck; Ezra Godden as CHP Officer; Alexandra Krosney as Josephine Kirtland; Joshua Malina as Howard Meeks; Teri Polo as Rachel Willons; Drew Starlin as William Johnson

Episode chronology
← Previous "Killer Chat"	Next → "Finders Keepers"
- Numbers season 3

"Nine Wives" is the 12th episode of the 3rd season of the American television show Numbers. Paralleling the Warren Jeffs and David Koresh cases, the episode features Federal Bureau of Investigation (FBI) agents and mathematicians attempting to locate and arrest the leader of a polygamist cult in which members marry young girls. Julie Hébert, a series writer, incorporated slave quilts and Levy flight into her script. She also included two explosions in the script.

The episode marked Hébert's directorial debut. Although initially averse to the prospect of directing a script that she wrote, she agreed to direct it. The episode reunited her with actors Teri Polo and Joshua Malina, both with whom she had worked before.

"Nine Wives" first aired in the United States on January 5, 2007. Critics gave the episode positive reviews.

== Plot summary ==
A traveler finds an unconscious young girl beside a road. California Bureau of Investigation (CBI) Agent Rachael Willions (Teri Polo) tells FBI Special Agent Don Eppes (Rob Morrow) that the girl is Josephine Kirtland (Alexandra Krosney), the 73rd wife of Abner Stone (W. Earl Brown), the leader of a polygamist cult called the Apostolic Saints. Drs. Charlie Eppes (David Krumholtz), Don's brother and an FBI math consultant, and Amita Ramanujan (Navi Rawat), Charlie's girlfriend and colleague, receive Don's call for assistance while traveling to Stanford University to attend a mathematics conference. Charlie and Amita find six likely areas from where Josephine could have come. Using satellite photographs of the areas from the Jet Propulsion Laboratory, Don and FBI Special Agent Megan Reeves (Diane Farr) narrow the number of areas down to a tract of land with a trailer on it. When FBI Special Agent Colby Granger (Dylan Bruno) and an FBI SWAT team go to the trailer, they find the trailer booby-trapped and empty, with the exception of a blanket with Aramaic characters and lines on it and a donation jar.

Willions talks to Josephine at the hospital and finds Emmanueline Kirtland (Anne Dudek), Josephine's mother, there. Emmanueline expresses her displeasure of Josephine's preference of dating a young man who was no longer a part of the cult, Lee Brady (John Patrick Amedori), to being Stone's wife. Josephine leaves the hospital with Lee and calls the FBI 45 minutes later, reporting that her mother is missing and there is blood in the kitchen. The FBI is concerned Josephine and Lee may have done something to Emmanueline because of the length of time between when they left the hospital and when they called. Upon questioning at the FBI office, Lee insists that he and Josephine went out to get hamburgers and has the receipt to prove it. Josephine and Lee both insist they were planning on running away together, and that's why they left the hospital. Meanwhile, Don learns that Willions was a member of the cult for 6 years before leaving (from 13 to 19 years of age), explaining both her ability to communicate with the Kirtlands and her desire to capture Stone. Upon their arrival back in Los Angeles to see the results of their assistance, Charlie and Amita unintentionally interrupt Alan Eppes (Judd Hirsch), Charlie and Don's father, and Dr. Millie Finch (Kathy Najimy)'s date at Charlie's house. After applying Wright's equation to their analysis, Charlie and Amita, along with Millie, who had suggested the equation while leaving the house, realize that Stone is revising his genealogy to remove any references to his sterility created by inbreeding within the cult. Charlie and Amita also realize that, since she is not biologically related to him, Stone's next potential wife is Emmanueline Kirtland, Josephine's mother and, as the analysis demonstrates, half-sister. Meanwhile, Stone kidnaps Emmanueline. A fellow cult member fatally shoots a California Highway Patrol officer who had stopped the van they are traveling in for a traffic violation.

Megan breaks the news of Emmanueline's kidnapping to Josephine and Lee and asks them where Stone would likely take Emmanueline. They tell Megan that Stone wanted to build a new community in either California or Canada. Don gives Charlie a MP3 player that the FBI found at the scene of the shooting. While listening to Stone's podcasts to find a likely location, Charlie finds a location in Southern California and gives the information to Don. Stone gathers several members of the cult at the location and, upon the FBI's arrival at the site, orders a shootout. During the shootout, Willions is shot in the shoulder and is rescued. Don tries to negotiate with Stone. Stone instead walks out of the building with Emmanueline and sets fire to the house, killing the remaining people inside. Don and the team take Stone into custody and rescues Emmanueline. At the house, Alan and Charlie discuss the fact that Stone took advantage of people's spiritual searches to further his agenda. Depressed about the case's outcome, Don joins Alan and Charlie at the house.

== Production ==
=== Writing ===
Series writer/producer Julie Hébert decided to base a script on the fundamentalist polygamous groups and cults found in 12 states. According to series creator/executive producer Cheryl Heuton, the case featured in the episode paralleled both the Warren Jeffs case and the Waco incident. The leader of the Fundamentalist Latter Day Saints (FLDS), a polygamous sect of the Mormons, Warren Jeffs was accused of raping two minors and of conspiracy to commit rape near Colorado City, Arizona, in 2002. In 2005, a grand jury in Mohave County, Arizona, indicted Jeffs on the charges, and the United States District Court in Flagstaff, Arizona, issued a federal arrest warrant 18 days after the indictment.

Hébert developed the story first and then asked researchers to find information about searches. One of the ideas the researchers found that she incorporated into the script was Levy flight. While others questioned whether the audience-vision, a graphical representation of the math used, was to be delivered by a man, Hébert insisted on Amita delivering the audience-vision.

Hébert also incorporated slave quilts into the script. Hébert designed the patterns, using large letters to indicate males and small stitches to indicate females.

=== Casting notes ===
Teri Polo, Joshua Molina, and W. Earl Brown guest starred in the episode. Polo and series regular Rob Morrow had worked together on Northern Exposure, and Hébert worked with her on The West Wing. Casting director Mark Saks wanted Polo to be in the episode, but he was not sure if she was interested. Upon calling her, he learned that she was a fan of the series.

Molina had been in the Numb3rs episode "Waste Not", which was also written by Hébert. He and Hébert had worked together on The West Wing.

W. Earl Brown previously starred in Deadwood. Due to his appearance, he was cast as Abner Stone.

Molina and Polo also appeared together in several episodes of the ABC show "Sports Night."

=== Filming ===
Hébert had written several scripts, including "Nine Wives", for Numb3rs. "Nine Wives" marked her directorial debut on the series. Although she was open to directing another writer's script, series executive producer Barry Schindel suggested that she directed the episode. For the scenes set in the Eppes' family garage, Hébert removed the back wall of the garage to obtain a specific camera angle. She also had to rework the walls of the hospital set to facilitate movement through the hallways. To hide series regular Diane Farr's pregnancy, she used a folder and a bag made from a material that was not supposed to make a sound when folding it. Ironically, the bag did not stay folded during filming.

During the writing of the episode, Hébert consulted fellow series writer Robert Port for information about explosives and included two scenes in the episode. One was at a trailer in the wilderness near Santa Clarita, California. Using a bicycle and a shotgun, Tom Bellissimo, Numb3rs' special effects supervisor, built the booby trap for the explosion at the trailer. Christy Somner, California's first female pyrotechnician, assisted Bellissimo, and stunt coordinator Jim Vickers pulled the door to the trailer once filming was underway. Four cameras captured the scene, which took three to four takes to film.

The other scene was shot at a compound that was built in the 1950s. Bellissimo used 60 explosives inside the house to set off the explosion. He also used propane to prevent a fire. The film crew filmed the indoor scenes first and then shot the outdoor scenes. To create the illusion that Stone and Emmanueline were closer to the house than they were, the crew used a long-lens camera to shoot the explosion.

== Reception ==
Critically, the episode received positive reviews. IGN.com rated "Nine Wives" as the best episode of the week in their "Crime Time" countdown. Jeffrey Robinson, a reviewer for DVD Talk, highlighted "Nine Wives" as an excellent episode, stating that it "revisits a somewhat common cult theme to crime-dramas".
