= The Janus List =

- Numbers episode
- Episode no.: Season 3 Episode 24
- Directed by: John Behring
- Written by: Robert Port; Ken Sanzel
- Production code: 324
- Original air date: May 18, 2007

Guest appearances
- Darren Capozzi as Chip; Catherine Dent as Naomi Vaughn; James Frain as Allister McClair; Gene Gabriel as Bomb Squad Tech; Rick Gifford as C.I.A. #1; Matt Gottlieb as Doctor; Shawn Hatosy as Dwayne Carter; Martin Jarvis as Taylor Ashby; Braeden Marcott as Victor; Casey Williams as Nurse Lois

Episode chronology
← Previous "Money for Nothing"	Next → "Trust Metric"
- Numbers season 3

"The Janus List" is the 24th episode and the season finale of the third season of the American television show Numbers. In the episode, a Federal Bureau of Investigation (FBI) team investigate a former triple agent's claims of someone poisoning him.

The episode marked the return of series regular Diane Farr from maternity leave. Farr was pregnant throughout the season and delivered her baby in time for the season finale.

"The Janus List" first aired in the United States on May 18, 2007. The episode was very well received by critics. In contrast, the episode left fans outraged at the episode's outcome.

== Plot summary ==
Running late to work, FBI Special Agent David Sinclair (Alimi Ballard), encounters a man (Martin Jarvis) who explodes a van on a bridge and asks to speak with brothers FBI Special Agent Don Eppes (Rob Morrow) and Dr. Charlie Eppes (David Krumholtz), who is an FBI math consultant. With the scene closed off, Don and Charlie arrive at the scene, along with FBI Special Agent Colby Granger (Dylan Bruno). The man tells the brothers that he has placed seven bombs under the bridge and will detonate them unless Charlie answers his questions correctly. While David and Colby work to dismantle the bombs, the man asks Charlie questions related to math, including questions about the Bacon ciphers and the Wheat and Chessboard Problem. After the man claims Charlie miscalculated the answer to the Wheat and Chessboard Problem, Don grabs a shotgun and shoots the man as he attempts to detonate the bombs. The man tells Don that he is giving Don and Charlie the "Janus list."

At the office, Don discusses the case with FBI Special Agent Megan Reeves (Diane Farr), who had just returned from her temporary assignment with the United States Department of Justice (DOJ). Megan is convinced that the man is a criminal. Investigation into the man's background reveals that their suspect is Taylor Ashby (Martin Jarvis), a former triple agent who preferred old-school cryptography to more modern mathematical methods. Ashby was fired from the company he worked for because of his obsession with the Janus list. The team also learns that the Janus list is a list of known spies. David and Colby search Ashby's apartment and find six covert listening devices from several countries. They then go to visit Dwayne Carter (Shawn Hatosy), an army friend of Colby's who had previously been arrested by the team for murdering a woman working for the Chinese consulate and for treason, in prison. Dwayne insists that he sold three names of spies to Ashby and would have sold a fourth name had he not been arrested by Don and his team.

At the hospital, Charlie realizes that Ashby is trying to tell him something in code. Using some books about Francis Bacon that Dr. Amita Ramanujan (Navi Rawat), Charlie's girlfriend and colleague brought, Don's suggestion of a key, and Charlie's earlier mistake on the bridge, Charlie, Don, and Amita learn that Ashby was poisoned by a man codenamed Janus. They also learn that Ashby had contacted reporter Naomi Vaughn (Catherine Dent) at a Los Angeles newspaper about the Janus list. Vaughn acknowledges that Ashby contacted her, but she does not know the reason for the contact. Megan and Colby place Vaughn in a safe house. At the hospital, Charlie realizes that Ashby has been left unguarded.

At Charlie's house, Don, who surprises his and Charlie's father Alan Eppes (Judd Hirsch) by sympathizing with Ashby's desire for his life to matter, receives Charlie's call about Ashby. Charlie, using the hospital's MRI machine, captures the would-be assassin. Don confronts Ashby's former boss (James Frain) on the roof of a building, but the former employer escapes. At the safe house, Megan expresses disillusionment with the FBI since her DOJ assignment to Colby, who insists that she should not be talking to him while outside, assassins who are surveying the house plan to kill Vaughn and the agents.

At the office, Don looks at a photograph of the bombs and realizes that the bombs were placed on the bridge in a G major pattern of musical notes, which he recognizes from childhood piano lessons. Using G major and the Bacon ciphers, Charlie and Amita uncover the hidden voice-mail account that Ashby used to pass the Janus list to Vaughn. While Megan and Colby fight the assassins who attempt to kill Vaughn, Don, David, back at the office, Charlie finally cracks the code which is a voice message of Ashby revealing which agents are betraying their respective countries. As they listen, Charlie and Amita are stunned to discover that Colby's name is included on the list and that he is a spy working for the Chinese government. Don and David arrest Colby as he leads Vaughn out of the safe house.

At the office and with Don interrogating as Megan and David look on, Colby acknowledges that he has been spying for the Chinese for the two years that he has been on the FBI team. David is angry with Colby and lunges for him, requiring Don to physically restrain David and take him outside of the room. Colby also stated that Dwayne would benefit the most from Ashby's death.

While transferring Dwayne and Colby to prison having gained of Dwayne despite Dwayne's furious protests and the CIA insisting that they handle Dwayne, Megan later expresses her frustration with her job, stating that she doesn't think she can do this anymore.

At the hospital, Don and Charlie stay with Ashby and watch as Ashby finally succumbs to his injuries and dies despite the doctors attempting to save him. At the house, the brothers discuss Ashby's life and death with Alan while toasting Ashby's memory with a quote from Siegfried Sassoon's World War One poem The Death Bed.

== Casting notes ==
Diane Farr's baby was born in March, enabling her to return to Numb3rs for the end of season three. She was pregnant throughout season three, and Farr's character was written out of several episodes before "The Janus List". When asked about writing out Megan temporarily, creator Cheryl Heuton told Michael Ausiello that Megan's posting ended when Farr felt ready to return and that Megan's posting would affect her.

== Reception of episode ==
When Colby was revealed to be a double agent, fans were outraged. According to series regular David Krumholtz, fans were so outraged by the revelation that they expressed disapproval of other things about the series. Some fans even thought that Dylan Bruno was being written out of the series. Unknown to fans, the producers told Bruno what would happen to Colby and the storyline's resolution several episodes in advance and asked him not to tell anyone else.

Critically, the episode was very well received. The reveal also shocked IGN TV's editor-in-chief Brian Zoromski, leading him to declare that "The Janus List" was "a great season finale" in the midst of an unimpressive year of season finales. Cynthia Boris of DVD Verdict stated that the episode "had me literally sitting on the edge of my seat" and called the episode "incredible" and "a lollapalooza". Jeffrey Robinson, a DVD Talk reviewer, called "The Janus List" "wild". Donald Liebenson, an editor for Amazon.com, stated that "The Janus List" was "thrilling and suspenseful". In 2009, David Hofstede featured Colby's arrest as question 637 in his book Obsessed with TV: test your knowledge of every channel.
