= Collision Earth =

- Written by: Ryan Landels
- Directed by: Paul Ziller
- Starring: Kirk Acevedo; Diane Farr
- Music by: Michael Neilson
- Country of origin: Canada
- Original language: English

Production
- Executive producers: Joseé Bernard; Tom Berry; Lisa M. Hansen; Paul Hertzberg
- Producer: John Prince
- Cinematography: Tom Harting
- Editor: Christopher A. Smith
- Running time: 95 minutes
- Production companies: Colliding Pictures; CineTel Films

Original release
- Network: Syfy
- Release: March 26, 2011

Collision Earth is a Canadian disaster television film directed by Paul Ziller. It was released in 2011 for broadcast on the Syfy Channel and later distributed by Anchor Bay Entertainment on Blu-ray.

== Plot ==
In 2029, the spacecraft Nautilus prepares to land on the planet Mercury. On board is Commander Marshall Donnington, Pilot Lee Tahon, and Flight Engineer Victoria Preston. However, during their orbital insertion, an unexpected solar flare erupts from the sun and hits Mercury, which starts to magnetize and tear the planet apart. The Nautilus gets caught in the event when its engines fail. Mercury fractures, but stays together because of the magnetism and is pushed out of its orbit, starting on a collision course with Earth.

Meanwhile, in a university auditorium on Earth, scientist James Preston describes a planetary defense system called Project Seven. After the lecture, a person from mission ops with the Nautilus explains that they have lost contact with the craft. Preston attempts to contact mission ops, but is unsuccessful. He then contacts Jennifer Kelly, a scientist working at a facility called Sphere. While on the phone, Preston gets command codes for Project Seven just before the power goes out in his house. Later, a magnetic wave passes Earth, damaging several satellites and moving anything metal.

After the solar flare event, Nautilus is left drifting in space. Marshall and Victoria find Lee's corpse covered with severe burns. Meanwhile, at Sphere, they calculate that Mercury will miss Earth by a distance of 500,000 miles. Back aboard Nautilus, the oxygen levels are fixed and Marshall stabilizes the ship. Back on Earth, Preston arrives at his friend, Matthew Keyes' observatory, where he tells him that something is not right. Victoria manages to fix the ship's communication systems and briefly makes contact with a pirate radio station owned by two college students, Christopher Weaver and Brooke Adamson. Matthew explains to Preston that the sun became a magnetar for one millisecond. Unexpectedly, magnetized pieces of Mercury begin entering the atmosphere. After the meteor shower, Preston retrieves a meteorite and determines that it is magnetized.

Later, Brooke and Christopher regain contact with Nautilus. When the students are unable to enter the Sphere facility, Victoria sends them to Preston's house in Pacific Grove. Preston manages to get into the facility, and tells his old boss Edward Rex to recalculate the planet's trajectory. They deduce that Mercury is on a collision course with Earth with impact in 18 hours. Rex decides to go with "Operation Recourse" instead of Project Seven. During the conversation, Preston sneaks away with Edward's security badge. Christopher and Brooke enter through the back door of Preston's house when he is not home, and accidentally turn on his computer. Preston walks in and sees them looking at the Project Seven calculations. He calls Victoria, who, once informed of the magnetism, has the idea of using a slingshot maneuver to break free and go back to Earth. However, they lose contact again.

Preston realizes that the Project Seven guidance system is damaged. Matthew comes up with a plan that Nautilus can tug Project Seven in between the planets. While heading to a fallback facility where the top secret files are located, Preston's car gets stolen. Brooke and Christopher arrive to pick him up; their car later breaks down. Meanwhile, Victoria manages to pull off the slingshot maneuver. She fixes the life support system after it gets damaged in the process. Rex decides to launch the missiles toward Mercury, which explode before reaching the planet, due to Mercury's magnetism forcing the missiles to go off course. While Victoria is headed back to Earth, Preston asks her to tether Project Seven to the front of Mercury to change its vector. They steal a police officer's car, but get into an accident, leaving Brooke severely injured. Victoria and Preston decide to leave her behind, as she is not breathing. Later, they find Jennifer dead, and take her badge to access the fallback facility. Inside, they find a computer and send activation codes for the energy field to Project Seven, thus enabling it. Victoria docks with Project Seven, guides it to Mercury and undocks before impact. Preston and Christopher run outside and see Mercury moving away from Earth. They contact Victoria and they tell each other about their respective views. A scene from outside of Nautilus shows asteroid debris from Mercury that has formed into rings around Earth.

== Cast ==
- Kirk Acevedo as James Preston
- Diane Farr as Victoria Preston
- Chad Krowchuk as Christopher Weaver
- Jessica Parker Kennedy as Brooke Adamson
- Adam Greydon Reid as Matthew Keyes
- Andrew Arlie as Edward Rex
- David Lewis as Marshall Donnington
- Catherine Lough Haggquist as Jennifer Kelly

== Critical reception ==
DVD Verdict criticized the film for overused plot elements and low-budget special effects.

== See also ==
- Mercury in fiction
- List of Canadian films
- List of Canadian films of 2011
