= Cause and Effect (Numbers) =

- Numbers episode
- Episode no.: Season 6 Episode 16
- Directed by: Nicolas Falacci
- Written by: Cheryl Heuton, Nicolas Falacci
- Original air date: March 12, 2010

Guest appearances
- Mark Ankeny as Jim Newell; David Burke as Jim Mazzolla; John Cariani as Otto Bahnoff; Stan Egi as Ralph Morris; Stephanie Erb as Linda Samuelson; Dan Martin as Det. Jack Cates; Gino Montesinos as James Shane; Michelle Nolden as Assistant United States Attorney Robin Brooks; Lou Diamond Phillips as FBI Special Agent Ian Edgerton; Luke Rosen as Ted Dacosta; Vyto Ruginis as Mike Hiller; Alicia Wollerton as Becky Mazzolla; Matthew Yang King as Matt Li; Bridger Zadina as Jim Mazzolla, Jr.

Episode chronology
← Previous "Growin' Up"	Next → —
- Numbers season 6

"Cause and Effect" is the series finale of the American crime drama television series Numbers. It is the sixteenth episode of the sixth season, and the 118th episode overall. In the episode, Federal Bureau of Investigation (FBI) agents and mathematicians attempt to find one agent's gun before it is used in a violent crime. When series creators/executive producers Cheryl Heuton and Nicolas Falacci learned that the number of episodes airing during the season was reduced, they felt that they needed to finish storylines in case the series was cancelled. To do so, they wrote an open-ended story to serve as either a season finale or a series finale.

Originally set to air in May, and February, "Cause and Effect" first aired in the United States on March 12, 2010. Critics mostly focused on the potential cancellation of the series, but two reviewers gave the episode reviews. "Cause and Effect" became the Numb3rs series finale after CBS's cancellation of the series on May 18, 2010.

== Plot summary ==
Drs. Charlie Eppes (David Krumholtz) and Amita Ramanujan (Navi Rawat) are married at CalSci. Charlie's father Alan Eppes (Judd Hirsch), Charlie's older brother FBI Special Agent Don Eppes (Rob Morrow), and friends FBI Special Agents David Sinclair (Alimi Ballard), Colby Granger (Dylan Bruno), Nikki Betancourt (Sophina Brown), and Assistant United States Attorney Robin Brooks (Michelle Nolden) attend the ceremony. Charlie and Amita's friend and colleague Dr. Larry Fleinhardt (Peter MacNicol) officiates. After receiving a call from FBI Special Agent Liz Warner (Aya Sumika), Don and David leave the reception to arrest Ted Dacosta (Luke Rosen), a man wanted on fraud charges. During the arrest, a man who has just learned that Decosta had swindled him tackles Don and David. The tackle knocks Don's gun away from him. Someone picks the gun up and walks away from the scene. A member of the Los Angeles Police Department (LAPD) questions Don about the incident, and Don completes the required paperwork. Nikki contacts her former colleagues at the LAPD for assistance.

At Charlie's house, Alan and Charlie notice that Don is upset about losing his gun. Charlie offers to help his brother locate the gun, but Don refuses, citing Charlie and Amita's upcoming visiting professorships at Cambridge. Don receives a call about two drug dealers who were fatally shot with Don's gun. None of the neighbors appear upset about the dealers' deaths. A tip from LAPD leads the FBI team to the leader of the community crime watch. He insists that he did not have the gun but later confesses to possessing it when presented with contradictory evidence. Don confesses to Robin that he feels that the search for his gun could determine his future with the FBI. Robin replies that the current case should not influence his decision. Meanwhile, FBI technician Matt Li (Matthew Yang King) discovers many references to Don's gun as a vigilante gun on several social networking sites. Charlie, Amita, Larry, and Otto Bahnoff (John Cariani), a plasma physicist who has assisted the FBI on two previous cases, use the small world network to track the gun. While discussing the math, Don and Charlie agree that, although they had spent their lives apart from each other, they want to keep the relationship they have with each other. The team receives another call, this time leading them to the body of a woman who planned to drink and drive without a driver's license.

Amita, Charlie, Larry, and Otto find a woman who used her real personal information on a web site which referenced Don's gun. The woman tells the agents that she passed the gun to someone named Jim. Don and David question Jim Mazzolla (David Burke), who claims that his neighbor Michael Hiller (Vyto Ruginis) had been bullying Mazzolla and his family. Both Mazzolla and Hiller deny being in possession of Don's gun. With Charlie's analysis and further investigation, the agents discover that Mazzolla, a criminal, was in the area where Don lost his gun the day of the incident. Don and David return to Mazzolla's house, where they discover Mazzolla's son, Jim Jr., (Bridger Zadina) holding Hiller at gunpoint. Don wrestles the gun from Jim Jr. and arrests Hiller on unspecified charges. FBI Special Agent Ian Edgerton (Lou Diamond Phillips) suddenly appears to escort Hiller. Ian informs Don and David that the team's earlier background check on Hiller, an escaped prisoner from Florida, alerted Ian to Hiller's location. Ian also expresses disappointment about not being able to attend Charlie and Amita's wedding. At the FBI office, Colby, Liz, and Nikki discuss David's new promotion to team leader of an anti-corruption team based from the Washington, DC FBI field office. Don, who recommended him for the position, tells David that David will do well in his new position. At Charlie's house, the Eppes family and the team celebrate Charlie and Amita's wedding. Charlie and Amita inform the group that they will be converting the garage into a guesthouse for Alan so that Alan, who had decided to find an apartment since Charlie and Amita have married, can have space and that they can have him live near them. Charlie wants to provide for Alan, and Amita is willing due to her Indian heritage. Confident about his work with the FBI, Don tells Robin that he will accept a promotion to become a special agent in charge. Don proposes to Robin, and she accepts. As Alan designs the new guesthouse, he, Don, and Charlie discuss the changes and the constants in their lives.

== Production ==
=== Writing ===
Citing a decrease in ratings, CBS reduced Numb3rs' episode order, the number of episodes airing per season, from 22 to 16 on November 4, 2009. Although the series had high ratings for the night, the 18-49 demographic was not as strong. CBS also wanted to air a series during the middle of the season.

For the cast and crew, the announcement about the reduction in the episode order came during the production of the eleventh episode of the sixth season. Series creators/executive producers Cheryl Heuton and Nicolas Falacci, who wrote "Cause and Effect", developed the episode to be a season finale that could also serve as a series finale in case the show was cancelled. They decided to write the episode in a way in which fans would see some kind of resolution of storylines in the event that the series was cancelled. They included some closure to several storylines, especially David's storyline and to one of Don's storylines.

To finish the season's storyline, several plot lines had to be modified by removing some individual stories within the season's main storyline or by revising some stories. For example, writers had planned for Charlie and Amita's wedding to be ornate with 200 people and with Amita's parents in attendance. Heuton and Falacci changed it to a small wedding at CalSci with Larry officiating the ceremony.

=== Reception ===
Although network executives originally scheduled the episode to air in May and then in February, they scheduled "Cause and Effect" to air on March 12, 2010. Over 8.34 million people in the United States watched "Cause and Effect", making it the 101st most watched series finale of all time. Critically, the television critics focused on the idea of the episode being a series finale, but several critics commented on the episode. Rob Owen, a television critic with the Pittsburgh Post-Gazette, stated, "Kudos to them [the producers of Numb3rs] for rewarding long-time fans by crafting the season finale to also function as a series finale." Matt Roush of TV Guide Magazine's web site was surprised by the amount of closure in the episode. David Johnson, a reviewer for DVD Verdict, felt that the episode was excellent.

== Cancellation of the series ==
When CBS executives made the announcement about the order cut, CBS executives cautioned that it was too early to know whether Numb3rs would be cancelled. When asked about the fate of Numb3rs, CBS executive Nina Tassler stated that executives cut the order for Numb3rs to air Miami Medical, which was scheduled to air midseason. Television critics expected Numb3rs to end at the end of the 2009-2010 television season. Citing a decline in ratings and a need to debut new series, CBS announced on May 18, 2010, that Numb3rs was cancelled, making "Cause and Effect" the series finale.
