= Val Kilmer =

American actor (1959–2025)

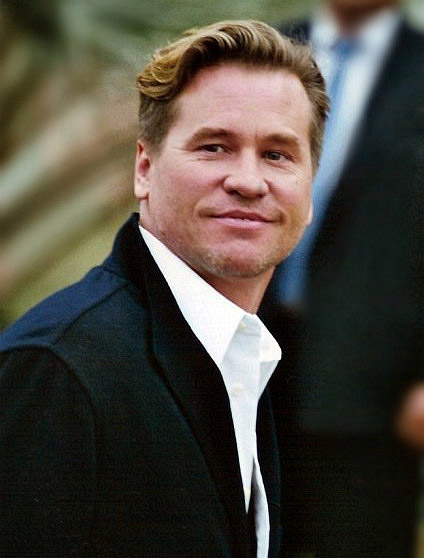
- Kilmer in 2005
- Born: Val Edward Kilmer; December 31, 1959; Los Angeles, California, U.S.
- Died: April 1, 2025 (aged 65); Los Angeles, California, U.S.
- Education: Juilliard School (BFA)
- Occupation: Actor
- Years active: 1982–2022
- Spouse: Joanne Whalley (m. 1988; div. 1996)
- Children: 2, including Jack
- Website: valkilmer.com

Signature
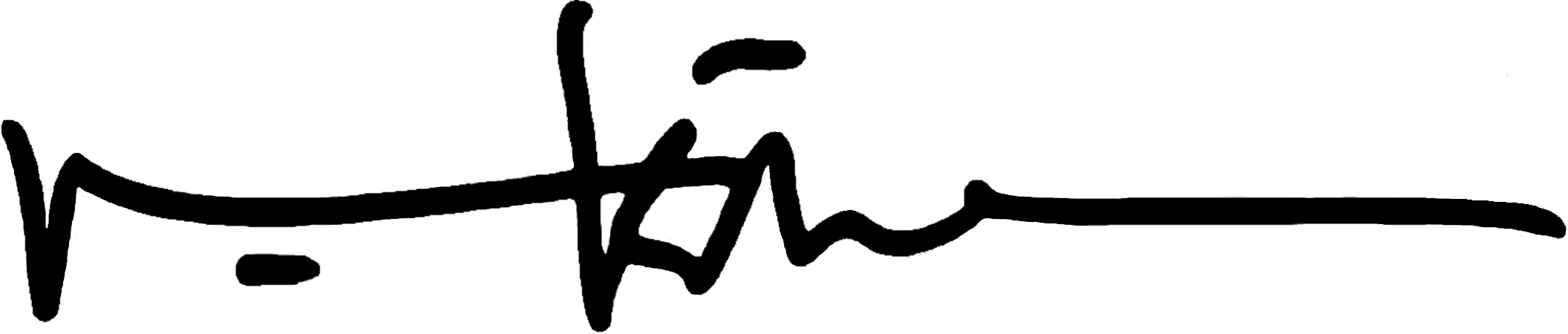

Val Edward Kilmer (December 31, 1959 – April 1, 2025) was an American actor. Initially a stage actor, he later found fame as a leading man in films in a wide variety of genres, including comedies, dramas, action adventures, westerns, historical films, crime dramas, science fiction films, and fantasy films. Films in which Kilmer appeared grossed more than $3.85 billion worldwide. In 1992, the film critic Roger Ebert remarked, "if there is an award for the most unsung leading man of his generation, Kilmer should get it".

Kilmer started his film career in the comedies Top Secret! (1984) and Real Genius (1985), then shifted to dramatic roles. He rose to prominence for playing Iceman in Top Gun (1986), Madmartigan in Willow (1988), Jim Morrison in The Doors (1991), Doc Holliday in Tombstone (1993), Batman / Bruce Wayne in Batman Forever (1995), and Chris Shiherlis in Heat (1995). Kilmer made his final film appearance in Top Gun: Maverick (2022), reprising his role from the original film.

Kilmer also appeared on stage, making his Broadway debut in the John Byrne working-class play The Slab Boys (1983). He also acted in productions of William Shakespeare's history play Henry IV, Part 1 (1981) and in the John Ford tragedy 'Tis Pity She's a Whore (1992), both at The Public Theater. He wrote Citizen Twain, a one-man show about Mark Twain, and played the role in a 2012 production in Los Angeles. Val attended Davenport North High School for 2 years.

In 2015, Kilmer was diagnosed with throat cancer. A tracheal procedure damaged his vocal cords, leaving him unable to speak easily, and he also underwent chemotherapy and two tracheotomies. He released a memoir, I'm Your Huckleberry: A Memoir, in 2020 and a documentary titled Val the following year, both about his career and health struggles. He died of pneumonia on April 1, 2025, at the age of 65.

== Early life, family and education ==
Val Edward Kilmer was born on December 31, 1959, in Los Angeles, California, the second of three sons to Gladys Swanette (née Ekstadt; 1928–2019) and industrialist and developer, Eugene Dorris Kilmer (1921–1993). His mother was of Swedish descent, and his father's ancestry included Scots-Irish, German, and Cherokee roots. His parents divorced in 1968 when he was 8 years old and in 1970, his mother married William Bernard Leach.

Kilmer was raised with Christian Science beliefs, which he maintained for most of his life. In 1977, Kilmer's younger brother Wesley (1961–1977), who had epilepsy, drowned in a hot tub at age 16.

Kilmer attended Chatsworth High School where he was friends with actors Kevin Spacey and Mare Winningham, whom Kilmer dated. He became the youngest person at the time to be accepted into the Juilliard School's Drama Division, where he was a member of Group 10. At Juilliard, Kilmer and Spacey's friendship ended over a financial matter.

== Career ==
=== Early roles and comedy films ===
Kilmer declined a role in Francis Ford Coppola's 1983 film The Outsiders because he had prior theater commitments. In 1983, he appeared off Broadway in The Slab Boys with Kevin Bacon, Sean Penn, and Jackie Earle Haley. That same year, his first off-stage acting role (excluding television commercials) came in the form of an episode of ABC Afterschool Special called One Too Many, although it did not air until 1985. It was an educational drama on drinking and driving, and co-starred a young Michelle Pfeiffer. Also in 1983, Kilmer self-published a collection of his own poetry entitled My Edens After Burns, that included poems inspired by his time with Pfeiffer. This book of poems is difficult to obtain and expensive; known second-hand copies cost $300 and up.

His big break came when he received top billing in the comedy spoof of spy movies Top Secret!, in which he played an American rock and roll star. Kilmer sang all the songs in the film and released an album under the film character's name, "Nick Rivers".

During a brief hiatus, Kilmer backpacked throughout Europe before going on to play the lead character in the 1985 comedy Real Genius. He turned down a role in David Lynch's Blue Velvet before being cast as naval aviator Tom "Iceman" Kazansky in the action film Top Gun alongside Tom Cruise. Top Gun grossed a total of over $344 million worldwide and made Kilmer a major star. Following roles in the television films The Murders in the Rue Morgue and The Man Who Broke 1,000 Chains, Kilmer portrayed Madmartigan in the fantasy Willow; he met his future wife, co-star Joanne Whalley, on the film's set. Kilmer starred in the Colorado Shakespeare Festival production of Hamlet in 1988. In 1989, Kilmer played the lead in Kill Me Again, again opposite Whalley, and played William H. "Billy the Kid" Bonney in Gore Vidal's Billy the Kid.

=== 1990–1995: Stardom with The Doors and Batman ===
After several delays, director Oliver Stone started production on the film The Doors, based on the story of the band of the same name. Kilmer spoke with Oliver Stone early in the project, concerned about the portrayal of Jim Morrison’s substance abuse. Kilmer saw Morrison as having picked the wrong heroes and embracing behaviors not conducive to creativity or inspiration. Kilmer saw Morrison's story as one that could be told "a thousand different ways" and did not want to tell it by playing the role of a habitual drug user; Stone agreed. Kilmer memorized the lyrics to all of Morrison's songs prior to his audition and sent a video of himself performing some Doors songs to Stone. Stone was not impressed with the tape, but Paul A. Rothchild (the original producer of the Doors) said, "I was shaken by it," and suggested they record Kilmer in the studio. After Kilmer was cast as Morrison, he prepared for the role by attending Doors tribute concerts and reading Morrison's poetry.

He spent close to a year before production dressing like Morrison and spent time at Morrison's old hangouts along the Sunset Strip. His portrayal of Morrison was praised and members of the Doors noted that Kilmer did such a convincing job that they had trouble distinguishing his voice from Morrison's. Paul Rothchild played Kilmer's version of "The End" for the band's guitarist, Robby Krieger, who told him, "I'm really glad they got 'The End'. We never got a recording of that live with Jim and now we've got it." However, Doors keyboardist Ray Manzarek was less than enthusiastic about Stone's interpretation of Morrison.

In the early 1990s, Kilmer starred in the mystery thriller Thunderheart, the action comedy The Real McCoy, and again teamed with Top Gun director Tony Scott to play Elvis Presley in True Romance, which was written by Quentin Tarantino. In 1993, Kilmer played Doc Holliday in the western Tombstone alongside Kurt Russell. In the film, Doc Holliday performs Chopin's Nocturne in E minor, Op.72, No. 1; however, Kilmer did not play the piano and he practiced that one piece for months in preparation. In 1995, Kilmer starred in Wings of Courage, a 3D IMAX film, and that same year, he starred opposite Al Pacino and Robert De Niro in Heat, which is now considered one of the best crime/drama films of the 1990s.

In December 1993 Batman Forever director Joel Schumacher had seen Tombstone and was most impressed with Kilmer's performance as Doc Holliday. Schumacher felt him to be perfect for the role of Batman, though at the time, the role was still Michael Keaton's. In July 1994, Keaton decided not to return for a third Batman film after 1992's Batman Returns, due to "creative differences". William Baldwin (who previously worked with Schumacher on Flatliners) was reported to be a top contender, though just days after Keaton dropped out, Kilmer was cast. Kilmer took the role without even knowing who the new director was and without reading the script.

Released in June 1995, Batman Forever was a success at the box office, despite receiving mixed reviews from critics. There was debate about the then 35-year-old Kilmer's performance: some critics, such as The New York Times' Janet Maslin, thought Kilmer was a poor successor to Keaton in the part; while others, such as Roger Ebert, had kind words for Kilmer. Batman co-creator Bob Kane said in a Cinescape interview that of all the actors to have played Batman up to that point, he felt Kilmer had given the best interpretation. Film critic Leonard Maltin (who criticized the dark tone contained in Batman Returns) complimented Kilmer's portrayal when he reviewed the film in his 2009 movie guide.

In February 1996, aged 36, Kilmer decided not to return for another Batman feature film, feeling that Batman was being marginalized in favor of the villains, as well as his scheduling problems with The Saint, and George Clooney replaced him as Batman in 1997's Batman & Robin. There were also reports that Kilmer had a bad working relationship with Schumacher, as another reason for not reprising the role.

=== 1996–2009: Further career ===
In 1996 he appeared in a largely unknown film, Dead Girl, and starred alongside Marlon Brando in the poorly received The Island of Dr. Moreau. That year, Kilmer starred alongside Michael Douglas in the thriller The Ghost and the Darkness. In 1997 he played Simon Templar in the popular action film The Saint. Kilmer looked forward to the title role as a change toward a more fun, less serious action thriller, while enjoying the "master of disguise" chameleon characters including a mad artist, a nerdy British scientist, a cleaner, and a Russian mob boss. Kilmer also wrote the poetry in the film. He received a salary of $6 million for the movie. The Saint was a financial success, grossing $169.4 million worldwide. In 1998, he voiced both Moses and God in the animated film The Prince of Egypt, before starring in the independent film Joe the King (1999). Also in 1999, he played a blind man in the drama/romance At First Sight, which he described as being, as of then, the hardest role he had ever had.

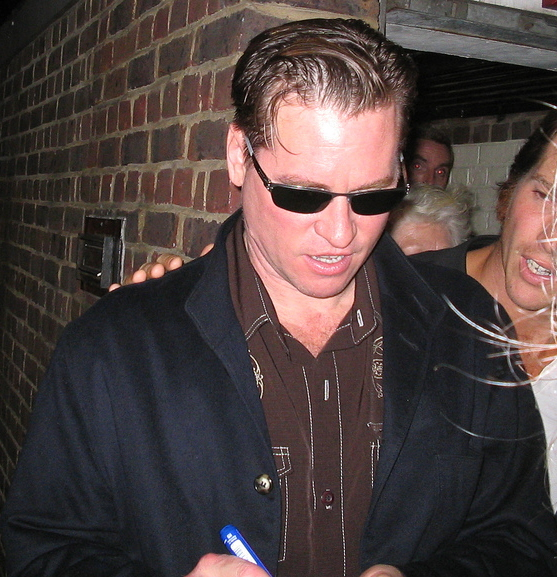
Kilmer in 2005

Kilmer's first role in 2000 was in the big budget Warner Bros. box office disaster Red Planet. That same year, he had a supporting role as the Dutch-born American abstract expressionist painter Willem de Kooning in the film Pollock and hosted Saturday Night Live for the first time. In 2002, he starred in the thriller The Salton Sea, which was generally well-reviewed, but received only a limited release. The same year, he teamed with his True Romance co-star, Christian Slater, to appear in the low-budget film Hard Cash, also known as Run for the Money.

In 2003, Kilmer starred alongside Kate Bosworth in the drama/thriller Wonderland, portraying porn star John Holmes. He also appeared in The Missing, where he again worked with Willow director Ron Howard. The next year, he starred in David Mamet's Spartan, where he played a United States government secret agent who is assigned the task of rescuing the kidnapped daughter of the president. He received Delta Force-like training in preparation for the role. Subsequently, he had a role in the drama Stateside, and starred (again with Slater) in the thriller Mindhunters, which was filmed in 2003 but not released until 2005. Kilmer next appeared in the big budget Oliver Stone production Alexander, which received poor reviews.

Also in 2004, Kilmer returned to the theater to play Moses in a Los Angeles musical production of The Ten Commandments: The Musical, produced by BCBG founder Max Azria. The production played at the Kodak Theatre in Hollywood and also featured Adam Lambert. This same year, Kilmer appeared in an episode of Entourage, where he played a Sherpa whose primary source of income was growing, harvesting, and distributing high-quality cannabis, all under the guise of obtaining metaphysical insights.

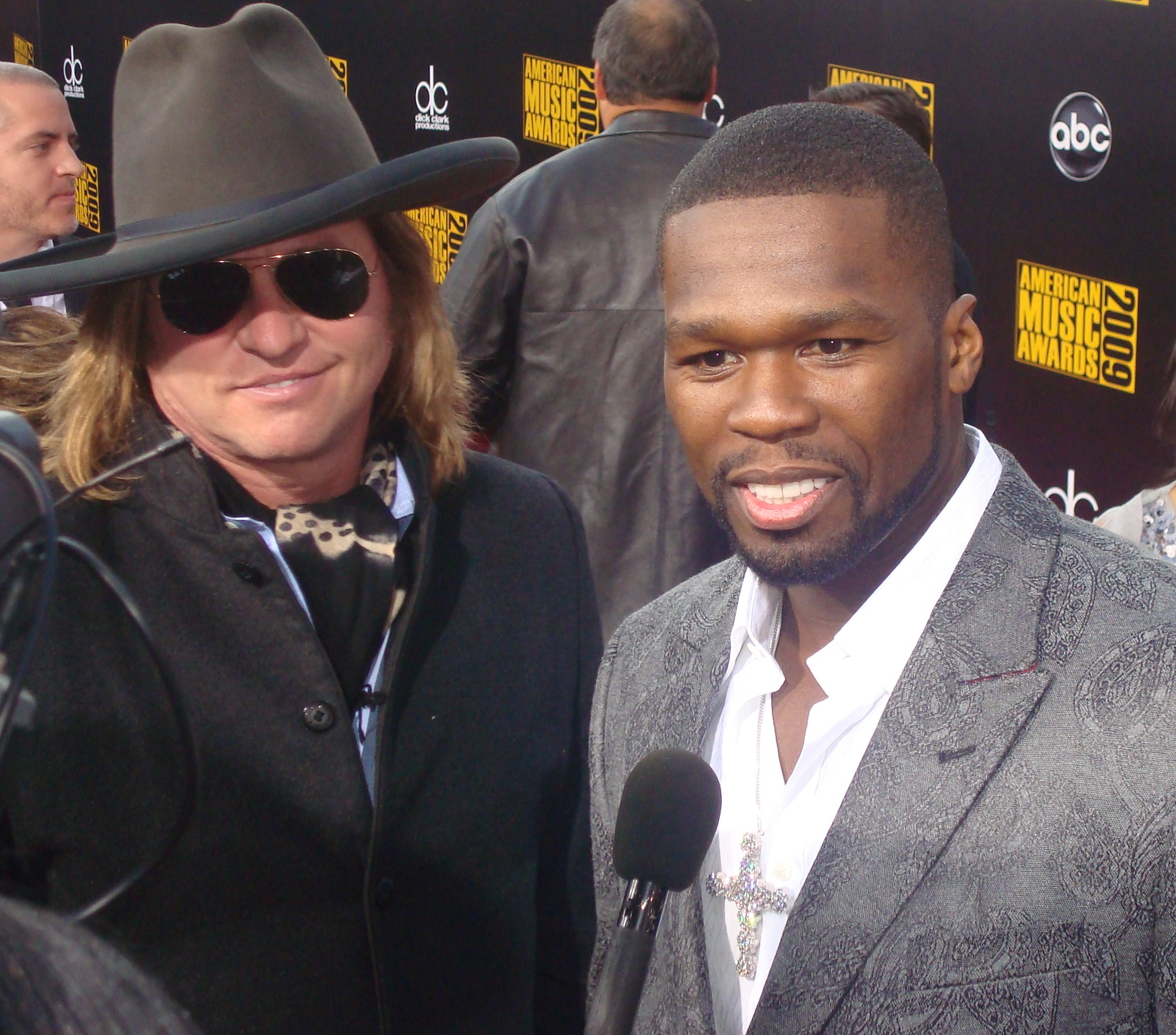
Kilmer with 50 Cent at the American Music Awards in 2009

Kilmer was in negotiations with Richard Dutcher (a leading director of Mormon-related films) to play the lead role in a film entitled Prophet: The Story of Joseph Smith, although the project never materialized. Kilmer performed in The Postman Always Rings Twice on the London stage from June to September 2005. In 2005, he co-starred with Robert Downey, Jr. in the action-comedy film Kiss Kiss Bang Bang. His performance was praised and the film was well reviewed, but it received only a limited release. It later won the award for "Overlooked Film of the Year" from the Phoenix Film Critics Society.

Filmink argued "...we're really surprised Kilmer could not make more of a comeback in the 2000s. Was he too chubby? Had he burned too many bridges? Another '90s movie star who hit a cold streak and got jowly? Alec Baldwin came back in a big way via 30 Rock, but for whatever reason, Kilmer could never come close to his old glory."

In 2006, Kilmer reunited with director Tony Scott for a third time for a supporting role opposite Denzel Washington in the box-office hit Déjà Vu. The song "Val Kilmer" was named after him on Bowling for Soup's 2006 album The Great Burrito Extortion Case. The song was later used for a Ford Motors commercial on season 10 of American Idol in 2011. In 2007, he guest-starred on the hit TV series Numb3rs in the episode "Trust Metric", portraying torture expert Mason Lancer. That same year, he released a CD, proceeds of which went to his charity interests. In 2008, Kilmer starred alongside Stephen Dorff in the Sony and Stage 6 film Felon. The film was given only a limited theatrical release in New York and Los Angeles in 2008, but it developed into a success secondary to positive word of mouth. Kilmer was the voice of the car KITT for the 2008 Knight Rider TV pilot film and the following television series. He replaced Will Arnett, who had to step down from the role due to contractual conflict with General Motors. In keeping with tradition established by the original Knight Rider series and original KITT actor William Daniels, Kilmer was uncredited for the role on-screen. He next starred alongside Nicolas Cage in the Werner Herzog film Bad Lieutenant: Port of Call New Orleans, and alongside Curtis "50 Cent" Jackson in Streets of Blood. Both were released in 2009. He appeared as the main antagonist "Mongoose" in a live TV series adaptation of the comic/video game of XIII on NBC in 2009.

=== 2010–2025: Later work and final projects ===
Kilmer at Pehrspace 2011

In 2010, Kilmer starred in Michael Oblowitz's horror film The Traveler, in which he played the vengeful spirit of a man who had been tortured and murdered while in police custody. In November 2010, aged 50, Kilmer was filming in Kelseyville, California. He was finally able to work with his lifelong friend Francis Ford Coppola and star in the film Twixt. The film was filmed mostly on Coppola's estate in Napa County. The filming was expected to take five weeks and was being independently funded by Coppola. In 2010, Kilmer appeared as the villain Dieter Von Cunth in MacGruber and had a small cameo role in the music video for Tenacious D's "To Be the Best". Kilmer spoke at the May 5, 2010, commencement ceremonies of William Woods University in Fulton, Missouri. During his week-long visit on campus, he also performed his one-man play, Citizen Twain. He received an honorary doctorate "in recognition of his creative abilities and his contributions to art and theater".

In 2012, Kilmer received a Grammy nomination for Best Spoken Word. He also starred in Harmony Korine's short film The Lotus Community Workshop, part of the collaborative film The Fourth Dimension. He plays a version of himself from an alternate reality: a former actor turned self-help guru. The Fourth Dimension is a collection of three standalone short films about parallel universes produced by Vice Films in collaboration with Grolsch Film Works, a new division of the namesake beer company. Kilmer noted that his addition to the list of actors, including John Malkovich (Being John Malkovich) and Al Pacino (Jack and Jill), that mock their real-life persona in fictional movies was an accident and said that, "I still love saying the premise because it makes me laugh every time."

In 2002, Kilmer worked on a film about the life of Mary Baker Eddy, the founder of the Christian Science church, and Mark Twain, one of her most famous critics. The film is about the lives and relationship of Eddy and Twain as "a quirky, tender, tragicomic portrait of two contrasting lives, set against the backdrop of the United States during the Gilded Age." Citizen Twain was initially performed as a one-man show Hollywood workshop in April 2012; it then became the basis of Kilmer's film project, his directorial debut. The 90-minute film version of his one-man stage show was released as Cinema Twain. In 2013, he reunited with his Top Gun co-star Anthony Edwards in the Disney animated movie Planes. Kilmer voiced the character Bravo, while Edwards supplied Echo. Kilmer also played the role of Detective Dobson in the series finale of the television show Psych.

In 2017, Kilmer appeared in Song to Song opposite Rooney Mara and Ryan Gosling and directed by Terrence Malick. Kilmer also appeared in the 2017 film The Snowman, opposite Michael Fassbender and Rebecca Ferguson and directed by Tomas Alfredson. In August 2020, Kilmer shared the screen with his daughter, Mercedes Kilmer, for the first time in Paydirt. Kilmer reprised his role as Tom "Iceman" Kazansky for the Top Gun sequel Top Gun: Maverick (2022). The 2021 documentary film Val, which chronicles his health struggles and career, premiered at the Cannes Film Festival to critical acclaim and later earned two Critics' Choice Documentary Awards.

As Kilmer's throat problems affected his vocal abilities, technology solutions were sought. In 2021, he collaborated with Sonantic, a London-based software company, to digitally recreate his voice using AI and archived recordings. More than 40 vocal models were created to find the closest match for future projects. For the 2022 film Top Gun: Maverick, director Joseph Kosinski stated that, despite reports to the contrary, they did not use Sonantic's AI technology in the film. Instead, Kilmer's actual voice was digitally altered for clarity.

Kilmer had been set to make an appearance at the Beverly Hills Film Festival in Beverly Hills, California on April 1, 2025, hours before his death. He was originally slated to act in As Deep as the Grave, but could not because of his throat cancer diagnosis. Instead, his likeness and voice were generated exclusively using generative artificial intelligence and "appear in a 'significant part' of the film"; Kilmer never filmed any scenes. The makers of As Deep as the Grave cooperated with Kilmer's family estate and the support of his children.

=== Reputation ===
Kilmer had a reputation for being difficult to work with and having feuds with his co-stars, notably Marlon Brando during production of The Island of Dr. Moreau and Tom Sizemore during Red Planet and Heat. Kilmer's Tombstone co-star, Michael Biehn, said: "People ask me what it's like to work with Val Kilmer. I don't know. Never met him. Never shook his hand. I know Doc Holliday, but I don't know [Kilmer]." Similarly, Tombstone co-star Stephen Lang recounts an on-set interaction where, after prior problems, he finally told Kilmer, "Look, from now on, Val, I'm just going to discount the first, say, 90 seconds that we're together because it takes that long for you to get through your bullshit."

Richard Stanley, who directed Kilmer for three days in The Island of Dr. Moreau before being fired, recalled, "Val would arrive, and an argument would happen." John Frankenheimer, who replaced Stanley, said, "I don't like Val Kilmer, I don't like his work ethic, and I don't want to be associated with him ever again." Batman Forever director Joel Schumacher called Kilmer "childish and impossible". In 2026, Adam Marcus, the director of Kilmer's 2008 film Conspiracy called Kilmer "[the] worst human being I've ever known... and that is really saying something."

When Kilmer's At First Sight co-star Mira Sorvino was asked about his reputation as "difficult to work with", she responded: "You know what, he was real easy to work with. I just hate furthering rumors about people being difficult, because it can do such enormous damage to their careers. My experience with him was nothing but positive. He was really professional and gentlemanly, and a terrific actor." Kurt Russell, Kilmer's co-star in Tombstone, said of working with him: "If you're asking me if it was great working with Val Kilmer, who played Doc Holliday on Tombstone, the answer is absolutely." Drew Barrymore, who costarred with Kilmer in Batman Forever, said of her experience with the actor: "Val Kilmer was so nice to me. He was so nurturing and kind and safe, which was a very important thing for me."

Hilarie Burton, Kilmer's co-star in Bloodworth, called him "the sweetest man" and said he cut a gratuitous sex scene between them in the film because "it didn't service the story or the character", instead changing it to a scene in which their characters are enjoying barbecued ribs. She said of Kilmer: "I felt so safe and cared for by that man ... He made the scene about us instead of using me as a prop. That one day at work rewired my brain. Val was kind to me. A thoughtful artist ... I hope every young actor has a Val in their life."

== Personal life ==
Kilmer was a lifelong Christian Scientist.

After portraying Jim Morrison in The Doors, Kilmer received counseling to help him separate himself from the character.

=== Relationships and family ===
Over the years, Kilmer dated Cher, Lesley Ann Warren, Cindy Crawford, Angelina Jolie, Daryl Hannah and Ellen Barkin.

Kilmer was married to actress Joanne Whalley from March 1988 to February 1996. The two met while working together on the 1988 film Willow. They had two children, including Jack.

=== Residences and activities ===
Kilmer with a friend at Kilmer's Ranch in New Mexico

Kilmer owned a 6,000-acre (2,400 ha) ranch in New Mexico, where he would trek, hike, fish, and raise bison. He sold it in 2011.

Kilmer was an avid musician; he released a demo album, Sessions with Mick, in 2007. He was also a painter and photographer.

=== Political views and charity work ===
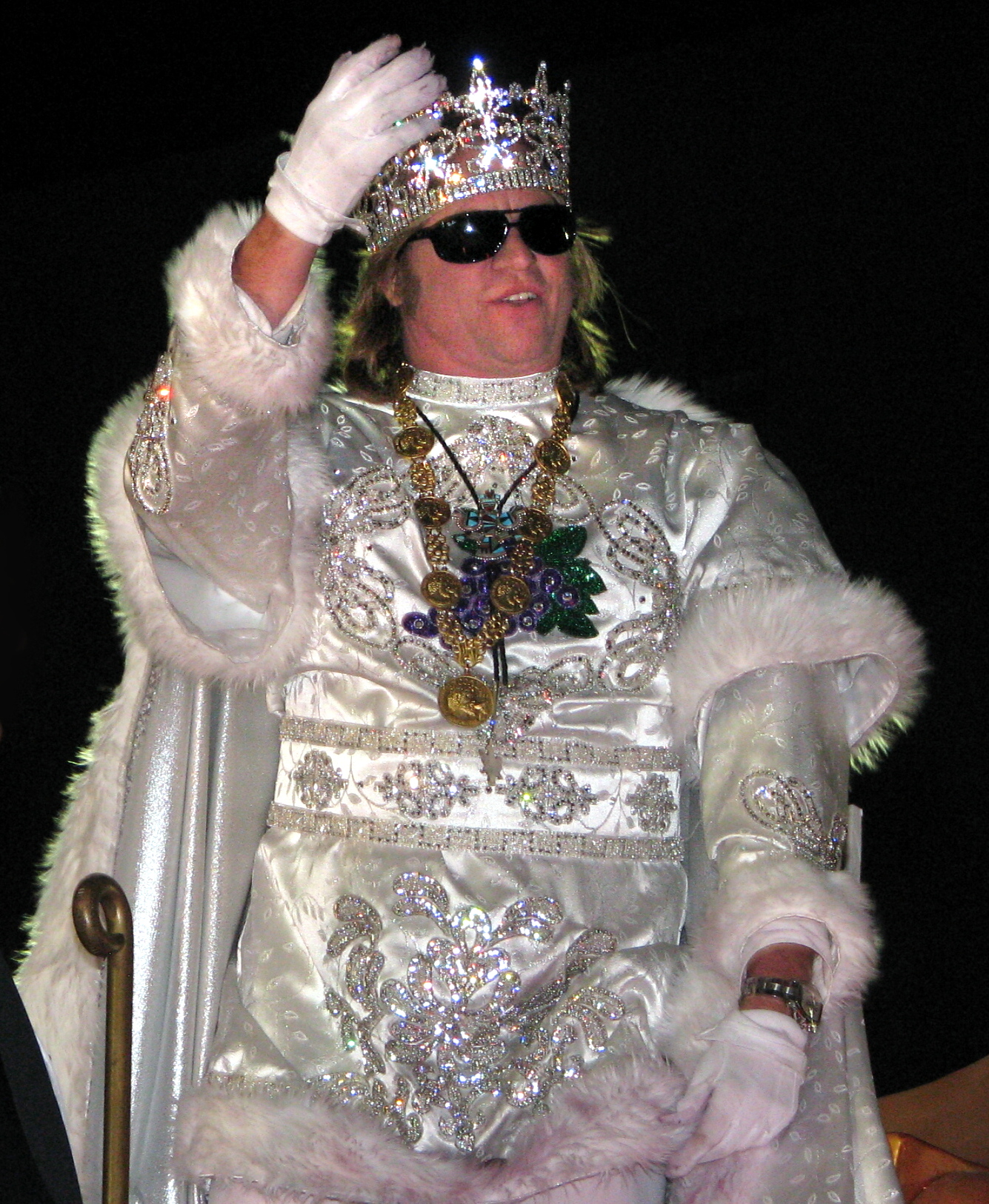
Kilmer reigning as Bacchus at a 2009 Mardi Gras parade in New Orleans

In 1998, Kilmer traveled to Iraq with AmeriCares to deliver humanitarian aid, the first US humanitarian airlift to Iraq since 1990. Kilmer made several trips to New Orleans to help in the 2005 Hurricane Katrina disaster relief. He was a supporter of Native American affairs and an advocate of environmental protection. Kilmer briefly considered running for Governor of New Mexico in 2010 but decided against it.

In May 2013, aged 53, Kilmer lobbied Congress on behalf of the Equitable Access to Care and Health Act, or EACH Act (H.R. 1814), a bill "to provide an additional religious exemption from the individual health coverage mandate" of Obamacare.

=== Health ===
Kilmer was a long-time smoker.

In 2014, Kilmer was forced to cancel a Citizen Twain show after losing his voice. He noticed a lump in his throat but did not seek medical care until he started vomiting blood. In January 2015, aged 55, he was hospitalized for what his representative said were tests for a possible tumor. Kilmer stated on his Facebook page, "I have not had a tumor, or a tumor operations [sic], or any operation. I had a complication where the best way to receive care was to stay under the watchful eye of the UCLA ICU." Kilmer was a life-long Christian Scientist; upon receiving his throat cancer diagnosis referred to it in the press as "the suggestion of throat cancer", opting not to explicitly associate himself with such a diagnosis. He underwent recommended chemotherapy following his children's request despite it being against his religion.

After previously denying persistent rumors that he had been diagnosed with cancer, Kilmer said in April 2017 at the age of 57 that he had experienced a "healing of cancer". In December 2017, The Hollywood Reporter revealed that Kilmer had endured a "two-year battle with throat cancer” and that "a procedure on his trachea has reduced his voice to a rasp and rendered him short of breath." To speak, Kilmer plugged an electric voice box into his trachea.

Kilmer ultimately underwent chemotherapy and two tracheotomies. Kilmer reported in 2020 that he had been cancer-free for four years but continued to struggle with medical treatments, including the use of a feeding tube.

== Death and tributes ==
Kilmer died at Ronald Reagan UCLA Medical Center in Los Angeles on April 1, 2025, at the age of 65. His immediate cause of death was listed as pneumonia. Underlying causes listed on the death certificate are acute hypoxemic respiratory failure, chronic respiratory failure, squamous cell carcinoma of the base of the tongue, malnutrition, and tracheocutaneous fistula. He was cremated six days later, on April 7.

Upon his death, filmmaker Michael Mann wrote, "While working with Val on Heat, I always marvelled at the range, the brilliant variability within the powerful current of Val's possessing and expressing character. After so many years of Val battling disease and maintaining his spirit, this is tremendously sad news." Director Francis Ford Coppola wrote, "He was a wonderful person to work with and a joy to know — I will always remember him." Tom Cruise honored his Top Gun co-star at CinemaCon asking for a moment of silence, saying: "I think it would be really nice if we could have a moment together because he loved movies and he gave a lot to all of us." Kilmer's Willow co-star Warwick Davis said of him, "I always like to tell the world how great he was, because I often think the media gave the wrong impression of who he was as a person. He was a very warm, generous, kind-hearted person." Director Oliver Stone wrote:

Val Kilmer was brilliant, both as Jim Morrison in The Doors and in Alexander as King Philip of Macedon. His approach and attitude significantly changed between 1990 and Alexander in 2004. The results satisfied me on both occasions. To call Val turbulent, contradictory, and tortured is an understatement. But the result was he was exciting on film, always exciting, and fresh. We need more Vals. He was an iconoclast and rebel in his acting, and always kept it exciting in either supporting or main roles. The movies will miss him.

The Doors' drummer John Densmore wrote: "As an actor, Val's channeling of Jim (Morrison) was so close, he gave me the creeps on the set of Oliver Stone's biopic. He should have been nominated for an Oscar as Best Actor."

On April 5, 2025, four days after his death, Saturday Night Live paid tribute to Kilmer, a former host. During the episode, hosted by Jack Black, the program displayed a memorial card featuring an image of Kilmer from his appearance as host on December 9, 2000. U2 served as the musical guest during Kilmer's 2000 episode.

== Filmography ==
=== Film ===
Year	Title	Role	Notes
1984	Top Secret!	Nick Rivers	
1985	Real Genius	Chris Knight	
1986	Top Gun	Lt. Tom "Iceman" Kazansky	
1988	Willow	Madmartigan	
1989	Kill Me Again	Jack Andrews	
1991	The Doors	Jim Morrison	
1992	Thunderheart	FBI Agent Ray Levoi	
1993	The Real McCoy	J.T. Barker	
1993	Tombstone	Doc Holliday	
1993	True Romance	Elvis Presley	
1995	Batman Forever	Bruce Wayne / Batman	
1995	Heat	Chris Shiherlis	
1995	Wings of Courage	Jean Mermoz	Short film
1996	The Island of Dr. Moreau	Dr. Montgomery	
1996	The Ghost and the Darkness	Col. John Henry Patterson	
1996	Dead Girl	Dr. Dark	
1997	The Saint	Simon Templar	
1998	The Prince of Egypt	Moses / God	Voice
1999	At First Sight	Virgil "Virg" Adamson	
1999	Joe the King	Bob Henry	
2000	Pollock	Willem de Kooning	
2000	Red Planet	Robby Gallagher, engineer	
2002	The Salton Sea	Danny Parker / Tom Van Allen	
2002	Hard Cash	FBI Agent Mark C. Cornell	Direct-to-video
2003	Wonderland	John Holmes	
2003	The Missing	Lieutenant Jim Ducharme	
2003	Blind Horizon	Frank Kavanaugh	
2003	Masked and Anonymous	Animal Wrangler	
2004	Spartan	Sergeant John / Bobby Scott	
2004	Stateside	Staff Sergeant Skeer	
2004	Alexander	Philip II of Macedon	
2004	George and the Dragon	"El Cabillo"	Uncredited cameo
2005	Mindhunters	FBI Agent Jake Harris	
2005	Kiss Kiss Bang Bang	Perry Van Shrike	
2006	Summer Love	"The Wanted Man"	Direct-to-video
2006	Moscow Zero	Andrey	Direct-to-video
2006	10th & Wolf	Murtha	
2006	Played	Dillon	Direct-to-video
2006	Déjà Vu	Agent Paul Pryzwarra	
2007	Have Dreams, Will Travel	Henderson	
2008	Conspiracy	William "Spooky" MacPherson	Direct-to-video
2008	Felon	John Smith	Direct-to-video
2008	Delgo	General Bogardus	Voice
2008	2:22	Maz	Direct-to-video
2008	Columbus Day	John	Direct-to-video; also producer
2008	The Love Guru	Val Kilmer	Uncredited cameo
2009	The Chaos Experiment	James Pettis	Direct-to-video
2009	Streets of Blood	Detective Andy Devereaux	Direct-to-video
2009	American Cowslip	Todd Inglebrink	
2009	The Thaw	Dr. David Kruipen	Direct-to-video
2009	Bad Lieutenant: Port of Call New Orleans	Detective Stevie Pruit	
2009	Hardwired	Virgil Kirkhill	Direct-to-video
2009	Double Identity	Dr. Nicholas Pinter / John Charter	Direct-to-video
2010	The Traveler	The Stranger / Mr. Nobody / Stanley Happerton	Direct-to-video
2010	Bloodworth	Warren Bloodworth	
2010	MacGruber	Dieter Von Cunth	
2010	Gun	Angel	Direct-to-video
2011	Kill the Irishman	Detective Joe Manditski / Narrator	
2011	Blood Out	Arturo	Direct-to-video
2011	5 Days of War	Dutch Journalist	
2011	Twixt	Hall Baltimore	
2012	Seven Below	Bill McCormick	Direct-to-video
2012	Wyatt Earp's Revenge	Older Wyatt Earp	Direct-to-video
2012	The Fourth Dimension	Val Kilmer	Segment: "Lotus Community Workshop"
2012	Breathless	Dale	Direct-to-video
2013	Riddle	Sheriff Richards	Direct-to-video
2013	Planes	Bravo	Voice
2013	Standing Up	Hofstadder	
2013	Palo Alto	Stewart	
2014	Tom Sawyer & Huckleberry Finn	Mark Twain	
2017	Song to Song	Duane	
2017	The Snowman	Gert Rafto	
2017	The Super	Walter	
2019	Jay and Silent Bob Reboot	Val Kilmer / Reboot Bluntman	Cameo
2019	1st Born	Biden	
2019	Cinema Twain	Mark Twain	Filmed version of Citizen Twain.
2020	A Soldier's Revenge	C.J. Connor	
2020	Paydirt	Sheriff Tucker	
2021	The Birthday Cake	Uncle Angelo	
2021	Val	Himself	Documentary; also cinematographer, producer, and writer
2022	Top Gun: Maverick	Admiral Tom "Iceman" Kazansky	
TBA	As Deep as the Grave †	Father Fintan	Likeness and voice recreated digitally

=== Television ===
Year	Title	Role	Notes
1985	ABC Afterschool Special		Episode: "One Too Many"; filmed in 1983
1986	The Murders in the Rue Morgue	Phillipe Huron	Television film
1987	The Man Who Broke 1,000 Chains	Robert Eliot Burns / Eliot Roberts	Television film
1989	Billy the Kid	William H. Bonney / Billy the Kid	Television film
2000	Saturday Night Live	Himself	Episode: "Val Kilmer/U2"
2004	Entourage	The Sherpa	Episode: "The Script and the Sherpa"
2007	Numb3rs	Mason Lancer	Episode: "Trust Metric"
2008	Comanche Moon	Inish Scull	Miniseries; also associate producer
2008	XIII: The Conspiracy	Mongoose	Television film
2008–2009	Knight Rider	KITT	Voice; uncredited
2013	Life's Too Short	Himself	Episode: "Special"
2013	Ghost Ghirls	Sweetriver Jackson	2 episodes
2014	The Spoils of Babylon	General Cauliffe	3 episodes
2014	Psych	Detective Dobson	Episode: "The Break-Up"
2021	The Choe Show	Himself	
2022	Willow	Madmartigan	Archive footage

=== Theatre ===
Year	Title	Role	Venue	Notes
1981	Henry IV, Part 1	Hotspur/Ensemble	Delacorte Theatre, Off-Broadway	
1982	As You Like It	Orlando	The Guthrie Theatre	
1983	The Slab Boys	Alan Downie	Playhouse Theatre, Broadway	
1988	Hamlet	Hamlet	Colorado Shakespeare Festival	
1992	'Tis Pity She's a Whore	Giovanni	The Public Theatre, Off-Broadway	
2004	The Ten Commandments: The Musical	Moses	Kodak Theatre, Los Angeles	
2005	The Postman Always Rings Twice	Frank	Playhouse Theatre, London	
2012	Citizen Twain	Mark Twain	The Masonic Lodge, Los Angeles	One-man theater performance, which was filmed

=== Video games ===
Year	Title	Voice role
2011	Spider-Man: Edge of Time	Walker Sloan

=== Music videos ===
Year	Title	Role	Notes
2012	"To Be the Best"	Himself	Tenacious D
2016	"Animals"	Himself	Oneohtrix Point Never

== Awards and nominations ==
Year	Association	Category	Project	Result	Ref.
1996	Blockbuster Entertainment Awards	Favorite Actor – Action/Adventure	Batman Forever	Nominated	
1991	Chicago Film Critics Association	Best Actor	The Doors	Nominated	
2021	Critics' Choice Documentary Awards	Most Compelling Documentary Subject	Val	Won	
2021	Critics' Choice Documentary Awards	Best Narration	Val	Won	
2012	Grammy Award	Best Spoken Word Album	The Mark of Zorro	Nominated	
1991	MTV Movie Award	Best Male Performance	The Doors	Nominated	
1993	MTV Movie Award	Most Desirable Male	Tombstone	Nominated	
1993	MTV Movie Award	Best Male Performance	Tombstone	Nominated	
1995	MTV Movie Award	Most Desirable Male	Batman Forever / Heat	Nominated	
2011	MTV Movie Award	Best Villain	MacGruber	Nominated	
2005	Satellite Award	Best Actor in a Supporting Role	Kiss Kiss Bang Bang	Won	
2022	Satellite Award	Humanitarian Award	—	Won	
1995	Saturn Award	Best Supporting Actor	Heat	Nominated	
2005	Saturn Award	Best Supporting Actor	Kiss Kiss Bang Bang	Nominated	

== Bibliography ==
=== Memoir ===
- Kilmer, Val (2020). I'm Your Huckleberry: A Memoir. Simon and Schuster. ISBN 978-1-9821-4489-0.

=== Poetry ===
- Kilmer, Val (1987). My Edens After Burns. Blue Feather. ISBN 978-0-9324-8220-4.
- Kilmer, Val (2021). Cowboy Poet Madman Outlaw: Selected Poems 1987-2020. A24. ISBN 978-1-7339-9206-0.
