= Megan Reeves =

Fictional character

- Numb3rs character
- First appearance: "Judgment Call"
- Last appearance: "When Worlds Collide"
- Portrayed by: Diane Farr

In-universe information
- Gender: Female
- Occupation: FBI Special Agent
- Family: Unnamed mother Unnamed father Unnamed three sisters

Megan Reeves is a fictional character in the CBS crime drama Numb3rs, played by Diane Farr. Created as a replacement for the character Terry Lake, who served in the same capacity, Megan is a profiler working with Don Eppes' team and serves as the head of the team when Eppes is away. Over the course of her appearance on the show, she has a romance with Dr. Larry Fleinhardt (Peter MacNicol) and receives an assignment with the United States Department of Justice, which causes her to rethink her career in the FBI. Megan was written out when Farr left the series.

== Characterization ==
Megan is persistent in her career and "calls things as she sees them." She teaches krav maga at the YMCA, and she is one of the best marksmen on Don's team. She speaks fluent French. She previously did a stint with the FBI's Behavioral Analysis Unit (BAU), the same unit that CBS's Criminal Minds focuses on.

Megan drives an Acura with a navigation system, according to Colby Granger. She can be seen carrying a Glock 27, standard issue to most female FBI agents.

== Backstory ==
In "Mind Games," she reveals she is estranged from her father, with whom she has not spoken in ten years. She has three older sisters. Megan stated that many of her life decisions were made when she was 16 years old, like leaving her home; she does not regret these choices.

== Evolution over the series ==
In "Obsession", she kindled a friendship with Larry Fleinhardt by admiring his classic car, agreeing with him that it is art. The friendship had progressed after a little while to a few lunches, a dinner date at an Ethiopian restaurant, and a late-night breakfast at a 24-hour café, where Larry compared her fascinating layers of complexity to the M57 Nebula. She hopes that their "orbits will meet again soon."

In "Longshot", Megan stated that if Larry needs more structure in his life she's fine with that and, with Larry's schedule, they can have dinner and a movie together every other Friday and lunch on Thursday. She is aware others find their relationship odd but does not care as they have decided to make it more serious.

In "Killer Chat", it is revealed that she and Larry have spent so much time together since his soon-to-be departure into space (on the ISS) that they have started to share each other's habits, which is shown when she says that Larry is like a "star collapsing in on itself". Megan was saddened over Larry's dismay involving his possible dismissal from the space mission and approached Charlie for help.

In "Democracy", it is revealed that the FBI Director has been trying to get Megan to join a special task force for the United States Department of Justice. Megan tells Don that it "probably isn't for me". She even dodges calls from the Director about the assignment. However, at the end of the episode, the Director calls and tells her that she never really had a choice about the assignment, and she is extremely unhappy about it. No details about the assignment are given; however, Cheryl Heuton has stated that details regarding this task force will be revealed in Season Four. This arc has been written in to accommodate Diane Farr's maternity leave, just as Larry's trip to the ISS was written to accommodate Peter MacNicol's stint on 24.

Megan returns to the team in "The Janus List". Megan is noticeably different from her pre-DOJ assignment; she is somber and quick to lose her temper with a witness under her protection. When three assassins attack the witness, Megan shoots two of them and knocks out the third. Later, she remarks that she doesn't think she "can keep doing this", indicating that her special assignment was extremely stressful and disillusioning.

When Megan comes back for the season 4 premiere, she is much more like her old self before her DOJ assignment. She alludes to having some time off from her job at the FBI while talking to Larry Fleinhardt. When Larry questions her about the DOJ assignment, she says that she's not ready to talk about it yet. Megan then says she's felt like she's been sleepwalking ever since she got back from her DOJ assignment. In "Hollywood Homicide" Colby Granger returns, and Megan welcomes him back more enthusiastically than the other team members. She tries to talk with David Sinclair about his feelings that Colby will always be a traitor.

Megan is more emotionally attached to certain cases. While pursuing a serial killer, she stays in more, pulling all-nighters and goes too far with a suspect. It is then certain that, on her DOJ assignment (and in accordance with Colby's previous words), they used her profiling skills to torture people. During a serial rape case later in the season, Megan is once again more emotionally attached to the case. She is more protective with the victims and goes to Larry for emotional support. It is revealed that Megan's college roommate was sexually assaulted, and Megan claims that she wasn't a good friend about it because she failed to help her.

In the season 4 finale, "When Worlds Collide", it is revealed that Megan is leaving the FBI to go to Washington to finish her doctorate and counsel women in prison.

== Creation ==
To replace Terry Lake, the writers created Megan Reeves. After quitting her previous show, Rescue Me, Farr immediately received an offer for a role on Numb3rs. Farr was to make guest appearances before becoming a regular. Since she was cast as Megan, Farr's character on Rescue Me had to be written out. To prepare for her role, Farr needed someone to coach her on the math and science used on the show.

== Departure ==
At the end of season four, Farr decided not to renew her contract. Some people speculated that she was leaving in order to spend more time with her family, since she was expecting twins. In an interview with TVGuide News, Farr, however, stated that, although she enjoyed being on Numb3rs, she left the show in order to develop a one-hour-long drama with a previous boss, Peter Tolan.
