= Colby Granger =

- Numb3rs character
- First appearance: "Judgment Call"
- Last appearance: "Cause and Effect"
- Portrayed by: Dylan Bruno

In-universe information
- Gender: Male
- Occupation: FBI Special Agent

Colby Granger is a fictional character in the CBS crime drama Numb3rs, played by Dylan Bruno. First introduced during the second season, he has become a part of the team led by FBI Special Agent Don Eppes (Rob Morrow) and is usually partnered with David Sinclair. This connection creates some tension when Colby is accused of being a spy for the Chinese which is confirmed in the season three finale episode, "The Janus List", with the news leaving the FBI team under Don's command shaken by the revelation.

== Development over the series ==
Colby was introduced in the second season of the TV show Numb3rs as a rookie Federal Bureau of Investigation agent. David Sinclair is his usual partner. Granger idolizes the legendary sniper/tracker Agent Ian Edgerton.

Having previously used the SIG Sauer P226, Granger had recently begun carrying the .45 ACP caliber Springfield Armory Custom TRP (Tactical Response Pistol) Professional Model, which indicates he is SWAT/HRT qualified, as only SWAT/HRT qualified FBI agents are authorized to carry that weapon on duty. This is proven to be true in the Season 4 episode, "Chinese Box" as he helps SWAT in the rescue operation to save David who is being held hostage in an elevator by a gunman. Granger later switches to the Smith & Wesson PC 945.

As new partners in season 2, David and Colby seemed to disagree with each other on methods used while working on cases. For the first few episodes, they did not seem to like each other at all. Over time, however, they became very close friends.

At the end of Season 3, it was revealed that Colby had actually been spying for two years on his colleagues, working for the Chinese, as had his "old Army buddy" Dwayne Carter (Shawn Hatosy), whom he covered for and then sent to prison in "The Mole". His fellow FBI colleagues were left stunned and shocked at the revelation, with his partner Sinclair taking the betrayal especially hard. Colby was immediately removed from the team and incarcerated. However, in the Season 4 premiere, he escaped while being transported to another prison and it is revealed that he was actually only acting as a triple agent in order to help out the U.S. counterintelligence. This could not be confirmed because his supervisor and sole CI contact, Michael Kirkland, had been killed. Any doubt of his status was finally removed when the agents rescued Colby from being killed by Chinese spies on a ship heading for international waters. Dwayne Carter dies, saving Granger once more by taking out torture expert Mason Lancer (Val Kilmer). Colby was offered a job in Washington, D.C., but chose to stay with his former team. David was distant with Granger, which caused their team to perform poorly on a mission, and caused Don to reprimand them. Afterward, the two reconciled and Granger was welcomed to stay with the team.

Among the team, Colby's experiences as a triple agent have been referenced several times, and, once, Colby cites it as a reason for not dating. When FBI Special Agent Roger Bloom (Henry Winkler), a 34-year veteran of the FBI's bank robbery division who lost his job because he stole 10 million dollars (US) to draw attention to a 2,000 dollar (US) theft at his sister's store, tries to solve a series of unsolved bank robberies, Colby relates his own experiences to Bloom. Moreover, when FBI Special Agent Ian Edgerton (Lou Diamond Phillips) takes Colby hostage after being arrested on murder charges, Ian references Colby's experiences in an effort to earn Colby's sympathy. Colby, however, insists that his experiences and his current circumstances are different. Only when David uses his and Colby's distress word to alert Colby to impending danger does Colby realize that Ian is innocent of the charges.

== Backstory ==
Colby did a tour of duty with the U.S. Army's Criminal Investigation Division in Afghanistan before joining the FBI, wherein his friend Dwayne Carter saved him from a car explosion, making him indebted to Carter in Dwayne's eyes. After getting his college degree, Granger received three years of training in interrogation techniques.

He was raised in Winchester, Idaho and plays golf in his spare time. He is also fluent in Spanish and was a wrestler in high school. His father died when he was 15 in a suspicious mountain car accident. In one episode, Colby reveals that his father may have committed suicide. He apparently enjoys fishing. He spent some time in Oahu where he enjoyed surfing as was seen in the episode, "Charlie Don't Surf". During several early episode appearances it is noted that he was also a graduate of MIT, although there is little mention of what he studied and the nature of his degree.

== Creation ==
Dylan Bruno was cast as Colby Granger for the start of season two. Originally a guest star, Bruno became a regular during season three.

== Reception ==
Colby became a fan favorite. During his first season on Numb3rs, Bruno, as Colby, developed a fan base. When Colby was revealed to be a double agent in the episode "The Janus List", fans were outraged. Bruno's portrayal as Granger had also earned him some recognition from the FBI. In a public service announcement, Bruno congratulated the FBI on their 100th anniversary.
