= Charlie Eppes =

Fictional character

Charles Edward Eppes
- Numb3rs character
- David Krumholtz as Dr. Charles Eppes
- First appearance: "Pilot"
- Last appearance: "Cause and Effect"
- Portrayed by: David Krumholtz

In-universe information
- Gender: Male
- Occupation: Applied mathematician FBI mathematical consultant Author
- Family: Alan Eppes (father); Margaret Mann-Eppes (mother; deceased); Don Eppes (brother)
- Spouse: Amita Ramanujan

Charles Edward Eppes, Ph.D., is a fictional character and one of the protagonists of the CBS crime drama Numbers. He is portrayed by David Krumholtz.

Eppes is portrayed as a young mathematical genius and professor of applied mathematics at the fictional California Institute of Science, CalSci (primarily based on Caltech, where some filming and mathematics consulting was done). As a world-class mathematician, Charlie helps his brother Don Eppes solve many of his perplexing FBI cases, sometimes with the help of his best friend, mentor and colleague Larry Fleinhardt, and his on-again/off-again girlfriend, former student and now wife, Amita Ramanujan, who further refines Charlie's approach and helps him stay focused. Charlie has consulted for the National Security Agency (NSA), in part as a cryptanalyst, for nearly five years, having attained TS/SCI security clearance. It was revoked at the end of season four after he transmitted information to Pakistan, but was later re-instated.

== Backstory ==
According to Eppes' father, he could multiply four-digit numbers mentally at age three and at the age of four required special teachers. In the second grade, he attempted to find a 70-digit narcissistic number in base 12—Eppes has described himself as "quixotic" in elementary school. A prodigy, he attended Princeton University at the age of 13 after graduating from high school at the same time as his brother who is five years his senior ("Soft Target"), and took Professor Lawrence Fleinhardt's quantum physics course in his first year. They became fast friends, with Fleinhardt establishing his academic connections. Eppes published his first mathematical treatise at the age of 14 (in the American Journal of Mathematics) and graduated at the age of 16. In fact, he was the youngest person to ever write a paper of importance.

It was his paper on the Eppes Convergence, which concerned asymptotics of Hermitian random matrices, that made him a star in his field. Following a seminar that heavily criticized this seminal piece many years after its initial publication, Charlie realized that his work with the FBI has prevented him from doing research significant to other mathematicians and now hopes to spend decades on cognitive emergence theory ("the mathematics of the brain") to rectify this certain inequity, which has delighted Fleinhardt. Although he was a child prodigy, Charlie now laments the fact that his best years in his research will never come ahead of schedule again.

Eppes is a multiple Ph.D. ("Decoy Effect"), a recipient of the Milton Prize and a nominee for the Fields Medal. Following his five-year research on random matrices, Charlie worked on sequences with orthogonal symmetry. He has also provided insights for possibly solving the P vs. NP problem and published works on H-infinity control of nonlinear systems and computational fluid dynamics, while his current research is in cognitive emergence theory. He has presented seminars on harmonic analysis and the zeros of random orthogonal polynomials and given lectures on group theory and Kac–Moody algebras. Eppes has taught courses on calculus, chaos theory, fluid dynamics, game theory and probability at CalSci in addition to giving guest lectures on applied probability. The lecture in which he converted the classroom into a miniature casino for analyzing probabilities is considered an "Eppes Classic". Also, Eppes has taken over Fleinhardt's computational physics class when he was asked to do so, and has given a joint lecture on circular motion and the Coriolis effect with Fleinhardt. Professor Otto Bahnoff took over Eppes' mathematical physics grad seminar on the day he got married.

== Characterization ==
Charlie has wild curly hair, is wary of people, and frequently enthralled with objects and patterns. According to Krumholtz, Charlie wants to understand how the world works. His father has said Charlie is easily fascinated, possesses a big heart and is thorough, but he misses certain things completely. Meanwhile, Larry observed that he is "a talented theoretician with an ego problem" and a student once described him as fast-talking and disorganized, to the agreement of Larry. Fleinhardt also accurately noticed that his colleague has a high standard of guilt and is a pragmatist. Charlie is rather fond of providing excessive explanations (e.g., his discussion of Occam's razor) and reducing complex phenomena to intuitively obvious situations through practical analogies that are quite unlike Larry's metaphysical musings and cosmic metaphors. (These analogies are known as "audience visions" or, as friend Megan Reeves calls them, "those cute little analogies.") While contemplating, his antics and mannerisms may even disconcert more conventional thinkers. Wearing his headset, Dr. Eppes has an intense focusing ability as he voraciously writes equations, often covering several chalkboards with a staccato clacking and the aid of a red chalk holder. Nevertheless, if his line of thought is interrupted during a tense moment, as one of restricted foresight, he can become very disgruntled. Further, when deeply concentrating on a particular problem, it seems Charlie is unable to provide insights to other topics for the sake that they are simply needed or wanted—he has to write what is in his head. Like his brother Don, he is characteristically stubborn and obsessive ("one part exuberance, two parts obsession"), especially when it comes to work, but he's rather naïve when it comes to human behavior. The latter often interferes with his FBI work and, thus, is the cause of much distress for him at times.

He is extremely talented in chess, as it requires both his father and brother to play against him and a distraction to defeat him. Charlie also has a vast understanding of theoretical physics, often assisting Larry with his multi-dimensional supergravity theory and papers on gravity waves, and biology, extending to knowledge of ciliate protozoa and the spread of infectious diseases. While brilliant in some areas, he is lacking in others. Dr. Fleinhardt has stated that it is a good thing he went into applied mathematics as opposed to engineering, as machines malfunction in his presence, though he was able to take apart and rebuild his father's cell phone to analyze its GPS transceiver. He is apparently a bad speller (e.g., he misspells "anomaly" and "conceited") and does not know the meaning of "defenestration" (for which Larry chastises him stating that the idealization is to be a Renaissance man and that even math and physics majors had to have a course on English). Thus, his father likes playing Scrabble with him.

Charlie is a rationalist. He is skeptical of UFOs, psychic ability, and gematria—all considered to be pseudosciences. He also does not like illusions. He, however, is also fairly open-minded in terms of faith and religion.

== Evolution over the series ==
The episode "Uncertainty Principle" is significant for the backstory it gives on the familial relationships, particularly Charlie's difficulty in dealing with his mother's death from cancer. While it's unclear how Don reacted, Charlie spent the last three months of his mother's life isolated in the garage, incessantly working on one of the Millennium Prize Problems, specifically P vs NP; it's a point of contention between the brothers. Also, Charlie doesn't think Don understood what he went through during their school years, especially how he was treated as "Don's brainiac little brother" by his peers in high school, and how he often left him to his own resources as a child, though he was not as inept as Don had reasoned. However, Charlie's relationship with Don remains strong, as he has begun to increasingly fear for his brother's safety on the job and still looks to his older brother for acceptance. Charlie and his father worry about Don committing to relationships, and for a time, fear that he had been cheating on Robin Brooks. Ironically, Charlie has similar problems with women himself. After a couple dozen murder cases, Charlie is somewhat jaded and world-weary like his brother. FBI agent David Sinclair of Don's team even comments that he has never seen two brothers so similar and yet so different. In "The Janus List", the brothers seem to take on each other's tendencies a bit. Though, in season five, Charlie is dismayed that Don does not reveal to him his newfound religious faith.

In "Prime Suspect," Charlie purchases the beautiful Craftsman family home from his father, who continues to live with him. Now 30 years old, Charlie wants to be responsible and take care of his father but still believes that much of the pressures involving their dad has been put on his shoulders as Don doesn't seem to have enough time. Realizing this, Alan sets his sights on moving out to accomplish things on his own, with Charlie seemingly supporting the idea, but has since chosen to stay as he favors his son's company. Recently, Charlie is bothered by his father trying to impose his will on him with maintaining the house, as he is a full tenured professor at one of the most prestigious institutions in the country working on "life-altering" mathematics, i.e., in solving crimes. Alan just wants him to be responsible and not end up like Larry, though Mr. Eppes respects Fleinhardt. Even he has thought of this possibility and decides to do more around the home. After Charlie compares his own situation to that of Einstein his father looks into information on the physicist and understands his son's predicament. Charlie also feels guilty about the amount of time his parents, particularly his mother, who always was attuned to his way of thinking, spent with him as a child; he even asks his mother (JoBeth Williams) in a dream if she regrets the time away from Don and Alan because of the special attention he needed growing up.

Charlie's research often interferes with his relationships: as with Amita on their first date, for all they could talk about is mathematics; Fleinhardt says that it is a common interest and they should not struggle to avoid the subject. Charlie and Amita had several false starts. Charlie has also spent some time with his ex-girlfriend, Susan Berry (Sonya Walger), an attractive neuroscientist from London. He had lived with Susan for two years, and Larry described this as his very own Berry's phase. However, she later reveals that she is currently involved with someone else and has to return to England. Charlie attempts to start a relationship with Amita once more, though her job offer at Harvard University strains this possibility and makes him distraught for some time. Eventually, she decides to take the alternative offer at CalSci with the hope to begin a romantic relationship with him, though his fear of possible failure causes him to question whether he wants this second chance; Don cautions him about such an attitude. Amita notices his ambivalence and isn't certain if she wants to back out of the relationship, but he then pushes it forward. Pressures from their colleagues over the inappropriateness of the relationship nearly cost them, but by the middle of the third season their romantic involvement stabilizes and they have grown considerably closer. He feels rejected when Amita does not want him to meet her father, due to his expectations about the men she dates. Initially, he wonders if it is based on him being Jewish, but the problem is that he is not Indian-born. Alan explains that Mr. Ramanujan would like him after meeting him. Charlie and Amita state that they love each other, and have even decided to move in together, though, the actual living arrangement has not been determined. When Amita's parents finally meet him, they are rude, but warm to him later. Alan says that Charlie will have to marry her.

Unforeseen complications with his work emerge as the new Chair of the CalSci Physics, Mathematics, and Astronomy Division, Dr. Mildred Finch, in the episode "Waste Not", makes Charlie head of the Ph.D. admissions committee against his wishes, bogging him down with more work, and gives him pressures about using the school's supercomputer for FBI work or missing classes for such. This leads to Charlie being confrontational, but she calms him when she says she just wants him to be "the Sean Connery of the mathematics department." In the episode "Take Out", Charlie and Millie attend a black tie reception for CalSci fundraising and bond. Soon after, Charlie is asked by Millie to meet with Macmillan Pharmaceuticals, which according to Amita has a reputation for exploiting third-world countries. Amita serves as his conscience in this matter, and he goes to see Dr. Finch about it. With "Pythagorean wit," he dazzles Macmillan and is to serve as a mathematical consultant for the pharmaco-kinetic modelling project, only under the provision that CalSci will administer the trials and monitor the drug at every step, all computational analyses are conducted by Charlie and his team, and 5% of the gross will go to third-world AIDS organizations chosen by Professors Eppes and Ramanujan . In "Democracy", as part of his duties, he recruits the young fantasy baseball and sabermetrics fanatic Oswald Kittner (Jay Baruchel), who shows great promise, to attend CalSci.

When Larry announces his leave of absence to board the International Space Station (in the episode "Brutus"), Charlie is shocked and upset. He is in denial about Larry's ambitions and he thinks reason of the risks involved will assert itself firmly in Larry's mind. He reasons that apparently Larry wouldn't do such a thing. Larry remands his few prized possessions to him, and he is grateful for the gesture. When he tells him his concerns, Larry is angered. Amita says to Larry, "[Charlie] has never dreamt of something he couldn't reach, so he has no idea what it is like to want something he is not able to get. So how could he understand how much [Larry] you would give up when this chance comes along?" Larry understands and decides to ignore Charlie's protestations. Though neither apologize, they are on good terms. Charlie says to Amita that he does not know what he would do without him, as he peruses through Larry's precious items that were bestowed upon him. In "Killer Chat", he says that he was glad that Larry's dream could come true, but feels conflicted about being relieved when he discovers that Larry might have been scrapped from the mission when NASA learned of his eccentric indulgences such as sleeping in the campus steam tunnels. However, Charlie agrees with Megan in wanting to help Larry and personally vouches for him. Eppes' words and affiliation with the NSA gets him back on the mission, thus, repaying a debt as Larry helped launch him into the academic firmament. Earlier, he had given him back his lucky T-shirt.

In "The Art of Reckoning", Charlie is initially overjoyed to see his friend Larry return, but Charlie is dismayed with Larry's lack of enthusiasm in life, so Charlie doesn't object to him readjusting at a monastery. His concern is apparent, and he says he just wants his friend back.

Since then, in "Trust Metric", Charlie is pleased to see his friend doing well, feeling that he needed a friend, and is glad to have focused on teaching while Don did not include him with FBI work; though, on previous occasions, he expressed the desire to be involved. Granger's escape from the prison bus causes him to become active in helping his brother once more, allowing him a chance to use set covering deployment.

Dr. Finch tells him to publish, and so he has renewed interest in old research, having decided to publish one of his eleventh-grade papers he started at nine years old, "The Mathematics of Friendship," with an addendum. A publishing company has turned his work into a classic book for those not mathematically inclined, while opting for a title with more pizazz, "Friendship, As Easy as Pi." Charlie takes joy in the belief that this book will allow his thoughts to reach a much wider audience than before. By the episode "In Security," the published book appears with the title "The Attraction Equation" and a dapper photo on the back cover of him holding a sculpture of a stellated icosidodecahedron with bevelled edges. A decision theoretic approach to relationships is covered in the book. His proud father hands copies to friends and Larry sells signed copies on eBay. He apparently has some fans and gives into a televised interview.

In "Checkmate", Charlie is training in weapons and tactics in LA's FBI school, where he is shown to have a high skill in marksmanship at the range, impressing many of his FBI training peers as well as his instructor, which he credits to following Wyatt Earp's preference for careful accuracy instead of rapid firing. He is given a certificate of marksmanship by the FBI. In the episode "Pay to Play", Charlie convinces Don to let him join the team when they go to arrest a suspect, mentioning that he passed the FBI course.

In the season four finale "When Worlds Collide", Charlie helps an innocent colleague accused of terrorism by sending genetic research to scientists at Pakistani universities which is prohibited, with full cognizance of the consequences. As a result, Charlie is arrested, loses his security clearance and ultimately loses his ability to help Don on FBI cases. Once again, Charlie holds strong to his ideals. In the previous season's "Burn Rate", Charlie has strong opinions concerning genetic engineering, believing bomb suspect, fellow prodigy, and former Feynman student Emmett Glaser's ideas about genetic predeterminism are rational, not incendiary, and helps to clear his name.

The charges against Dr. Eppes are dropped. For a time, Don Eppes' team is attempting to make do with Fleinhardt's and Amita's expertise, but Charles' assistance is sorely missed to the point of consulting him secretly. For his part, Charles has been convinced by his lawyer and father to attempt to have his clearance restored. Even Don supports the idea and stands up to security clearance investigator Carl McGowan (Keith Carradine), stating to go after him, not his brother. Temporarily, Charlie works as a LAPD consultant until the fiasco with his security clearance can be resolved. He later gets his clearance back and is working with his brother and the FBI again. He is trying to assert himself in the methodology used to solve a crime, having struggled with not being included, but some friction arises with Amita and Larry.

Charlie works once again with rival Marshall Penfield, as they settle their differences ("Frienemies"). Also, he is chosen to be the head of the think tank model comprising himself, Larry, Alan, and Amita ("Jacked"). As Dr. Eppes applies the Turing Test to a seemingly unique artificial intelligence, he is tricked only to come to the realization that the computer only uses a recursive algorithm to apply the most human responses, while simultaneously being tempted by an offer to work for DARPA. Head of DARPA special projects Jane Karellen (Nancy Travis) knows that he has a limited window to use his genius and tells Charlie that he is one of the top five minds on the planet. Amita's life is even threatened by the advanced computer ("First Law").

Late in season five, Charlie moves into a new office. While moving, he gets some inspiration for his cognitive emergence theory, which causes him to momentarily set aside his work on a series of home invasions for Don. Don is stabbed while attempting to arrest the home invaders ("The Fifth Man"). Charlie blames himself for Don being stabbed and throws himself into his FBI consultation work as a result ("Disturbed"). This worries everyone, especially Don, who tells him to "do whatever you want to do" ("Greatest Hits") while visiting Charlie in his new office. Around this time, Charlie is also presented with a series of letters from previous successive holders of this prestigious office, wherein each celebrated mathematician writes of accomplishments they intend to achieve, passing down the torch to the next in line to do the same. At first Charlie is hesitant, until the very determined Amita convinces him to write the corresponding letter and eases his burdens, as Charlie fears he cannot meet his destiny with so much weight to succeed being placed on his shoulders his entire life.

At the end of the season, while leaving for dinner, Charlie is attacked, and Amita is kidnapped. Charlie is so emotionally distraught that he cannot think of the math needed to find Amita. With the help of Don, Alan, and David, Charlie snaps out of it to locate Amita. Amita is rescued. He realizes that he did not want to lose Amita, and he proposes to her ("Angels and Devils").

At the end the premiere episode of the program's sixth season, it was revealed that Amita has accepted Charlie's proposal. The issue was skirted throughout the episode, as the two were waiting until Amita officially received permission from her parents. He and Amita discuss the number of children that they want to have, and they both decide that they may need to participate in the Big Brother/Big Sister program for some practical experience before having children. He and Amita attempt to find a wedding date that is suited to their and their families' schedules; Alan suggests that they should take his and Margaret's anniversary date as Charlie and Amita's date. Charlie and Amita have since pushed the date forward as his academic fantasy has come to light, being a visiting professor at Cambridge University. In the season finale, after the wedding ceremony presided over by Larry, he is happy but worries about disconnecting with Don and offers to have the garage renovated into a guest house for his father. He toasts his friends and family and amazes at the prospect of staying in England with his wife.

== Creation ==
Long intrigued by mathematicians and scientists, creators Cheryl Heuton and Nick Falacci created a show with one as the protagonist. Inspiration for Charlie came specifically from Richard Feynman. Finding the actor who would portray Charlie would be a challenge. Over one hundred actors auditioned for the role of Charlie Eppes. One of the actors was David Krumholtz, who later admitted in an interview with TVGuide.com and in an interview with USA Weekend's Lorrie Lynch to failing math in high school. Krumholtz was cast as Charlie because of his ability to make math sound natural.

To prepare for his role of Charlie Eppes, Krumholtz spent some time at Caltech talking to professors and walking the Caltech campus, attempting to understand both the basics of the math and the mathematician's mind. He even spoke with Dr. Tony Chan of UCLA about mathematicians’ work while filming the first pilot. Math consultants helped Krumholtz understand the basics of the equations on the show. Early on, Professor Rick Wilson's graduate student, David Grynkiewicz, showed Krumholtz how to write his own equations and even filled in for his hand in several episodes. Krumholtz later frequently wrote the equations himself.

Krumholtz memorized the pages of mathematical equations and concepts that are a part of the script. When doing scenes involving audience-visions, Krumholtz preferred to recite his lines as the cameras were rolling; producers went along with this because they reasoned that if the cameras weren't rolling, the lines wouldn't make it into the show. (Audience visions are Charlie's visually-aided explanations of the mathematics involved in a case.)

== Reception ==
Early reception of Charlie varied according to the audience in question. Due to television production's traditional approach of utilizing only two worlds for filming, production staff initially opposed the idea of Charlie being a college professor. Some even unsuccessfully suggested to Heuton and Falacci that Charlie should be working with the FBI full-time as an employee.

When the pilot was previewed, the reception was more positive. CBS executive Nina Tassler liked Charlie. The focus group that watched the original pilot for Numb3rs loved him.

When Numb3rs was previewed for the TV critics, the reception was different. Melanie McFarland, TV critic for the Seattle Post-Intelligencer, stated that Charlie was not original as of the Pilot. According to Lauren Aaronson of Popular Science, Charlie's expertise seems a little bit incredible. Robert Bianco of USA Today, however, called Krumholtz, as Charlie, "appealing". Toni Fitzgerald of Media Life Magazine stated that Krumholtz, as Charlie, "stands out".

Since the early days of the series, the character of Charlie Eppes has become more widely accepted. Krumholtz appeared at the 2005 National Council of Teachers of Mathematics (NCTM) convention in Anaheim. Since then, Krumholtz receives cheers when he attends math conventions. In a public service announcement, Krumholtz congratulated the Federal Bureau of Investigation on their 100th anniversary. Charlie was one of the first geeks on primetime television who paved the way for other shows starring geeks such as Bones, Chuck and The Big Bang Theory. Charlie was a runner-up in the category of "Sexiest Brainiac" in TV Guide's poll in 2007.

== CharlieVision ==
CharlieVision (as labeled by the show's creators) is the mode in which Charlie's insights are displayed on-screen. It consists of fast-paced visions or cutscenes often characterized by false-color images that integrate his analogies and mathematical models, usually followed by him rushing off to tell Don about his new insights. 'CharlieVision' is not to be confused with "audience visions," in which Charlie's voice uses an analogy to simplify a mathematical concept while corresponding images are flashed on screen. Ridley Scott and Tony Scott, executive producers for Numb3rs, designed the specifics of the Charlie-visions, such as the ash yellow color that appears on-screen when Charlie suddenly becomes inspired.
