= Diane Farr =

American actress, producer (born 1969)

- Born: September 7, 1969 (age 56); Manhattan, New York, U.S.
- Occupations: Actress, producer, author
- Years active: c. 1981–present
- Spouse: Seung Yong Chung (m. 2006; div. 2017)
- Children: 3

Signature
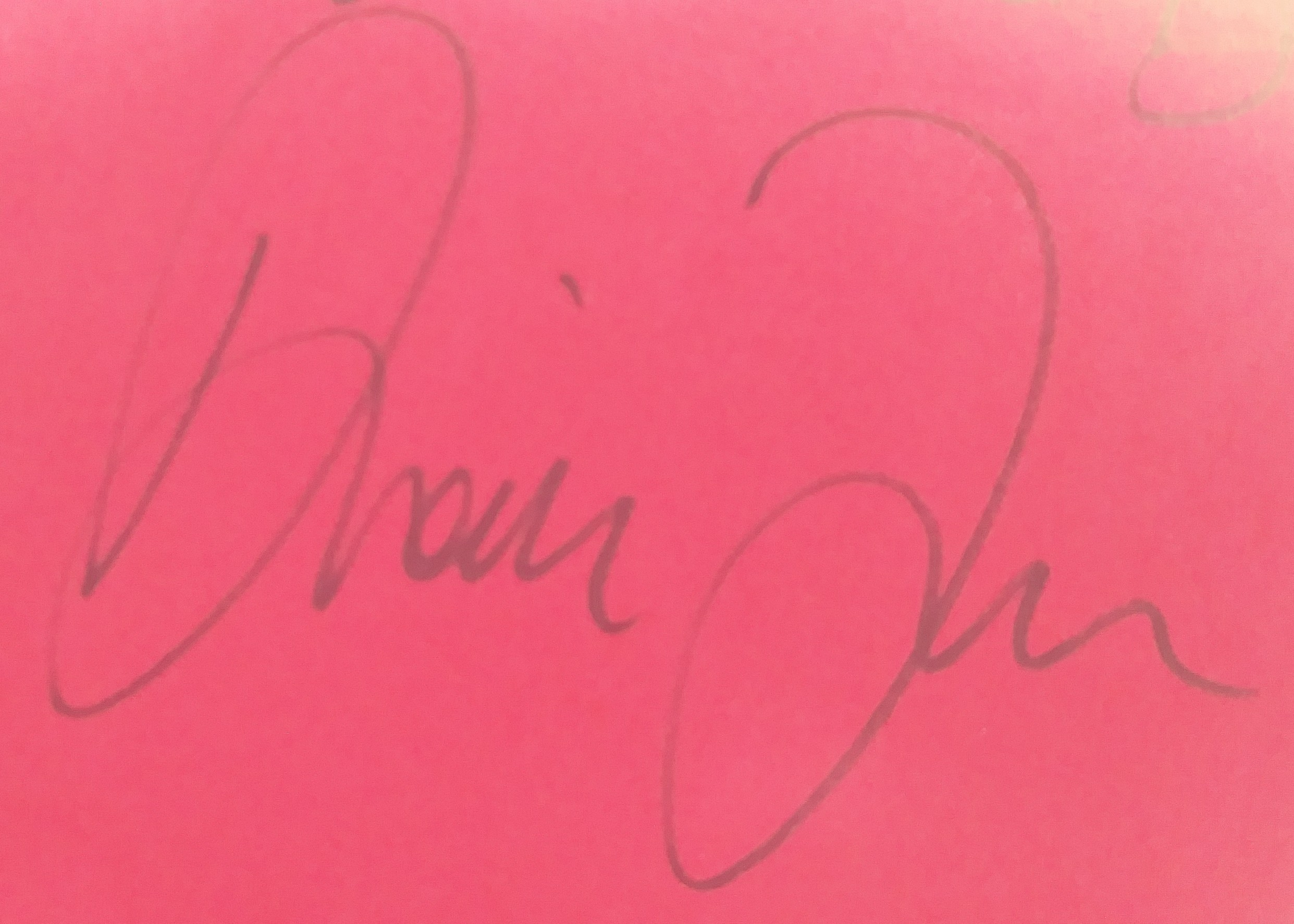

Diane Farr (born September 7, 1969) is an American actress, producer, and author. Her television roles have included FBI agent Megan Reeves in Numb3rs, the firefighter Laura Miles in Rescue Me, and the division chief Sharon Leone in Fire Country.

== Life and career ==
Farr was born in New York City. She is of Irish and Italian descent. She modeled as an adolescent, and at the age of 19, became the youngest person to be crowned "Miss New York". Farr studied drama at New York's Stony Brook University, with semesters at Loughborough University in England, graduating magna cum laude with a joint BA in Theatre from the two universities.

Farr has written two books. The first, The Girl Code, was published in 2001 and has been translated into seven languages. It discusses the secret language of single women. Her second book, Kissing Outside the Lines, was published in May 2011 and is a comical memoir of her path to an interracial marriage. Farr also writes for a number of American magazines and has an internationally syndicated newspaper column for the International Herald Tribune.

Farr was a supporting host for 200 episodes of the advice program Loveline on MTV and made guest appearances on The Drew Carey Show, Arli$$, and CSI. She portrayed the recurring role of Amy DeLuca, mother to the series co-star Majandra Delfino's character Maria, on The WB's and later UPN's Roswell. She also played Maddie Hudson on The WB's Like Family. Later, she played Detective Jan Fendrich on the ABC series The Job, co-created by and starring Denis Leary. Following the end of that series, she appeared in the cast of Rescue Me (also co-created by and starring Leary), playing a firefighter for two seasons. She left Rescue Me to star as FBI agent Megan Reeves on the CBS crime drama Numb3rs.

Farr opted not to renew her contract and left Numb3rs following the show's fourth season. She starred in her final episode on May 18, 2008. Farr then joined the Showtime series Californication for a 10-episode run in autumn 2009.

In April 2010, Farr had a role as Barbara, a mother whose negative influence led her son Eddie to become a serial killer, in a flashback episode of Desperate Housewives. When Barbara discovered Eddie's collection of newspaper articles about the women he hurt or murdered, he strangled her to death. She guest-starred in White Collar as a waitress named Gina De Stefano.

Farr guest-starred in season seven of Grey's Anatomy, where in episode 130, she played the role of a patient with Huntington's disease under the care of Meredith, played by the series star Ellen Pompeo. She also had a recurring role in the final season (2012–13) of the Grey's Anatomy spin-off series, Private Practice, as Miranda, a terminal cancer patient and the love interest of Dr. Sheldon Wallace (Brian Benben).

For several years starting in 2010, Farr wrote, directed, and presented a reality comedy series for Funny or Die called AssCastles.

In Adam Carolla's 2015 film Road Hard, Farr starred as his character's love interest.

Currently, Farr stars as Sharon Leone, Cal Fire Division Chief and mother of lead character Bode Donovan, in Jerry Bruckheimer's 2022 American drama television series, Fire Country.

== Personal life ==
On June 24, 2006, then-36-year-old Farr married 35-year-old entertainment marketing executive Seung Yong Chung, at a ceremony in Mammoth Lakes, California. Their first child was a son, and they later had twin daughters. The couple divorced in 2017, though the relationship remains amicable and the family congregated together during the COVID-19 lockdowns in 2020.

Farr has served as an ambassador to the Mineseeker Foundation and the Sole for African Child Foundation.

== Filmography ==
=== Partial Film ===
Year	Title	Role	Notes
1998	Divorced White Male	Lisa	
1999	Bingo	Miranda	Short film
1999	Little Indiscretions	C.J.	
2000	Flooding	Personal Ad Girl	
2002	Hourly Rates	Shania	
2007	The Third Nail	Hannah	
2010	Ass Castle: Part 1		Short film
2011	The Carrier	Claudia	Short film
2012	About Cherry	Jillian	
2013	Almost Broadway	Rachel	Completed
2013	WildLike	Jane	
2015	Road Hard	Sarah	
2016	12 Feet Deep	Clara	
2016	American Romance	Brenda Reed	
2017	Palm Swings	Claire	

=== Television ===
Year	Title	Role	Notes
1992	Silk Stalkings	Production Assistant	Episode: "Baser Instincts"
1996	Unhappily Ever After	Michelle	Episode: "Jack Writes Good"
1997	In the House	Dr. Young	Episode: "Saint Marion"
1998	V.I.P.	Helen	Episode: "Scents and Sensibility"
1998	Arli$$	Erica Lansing	Episode: "Behind Every Great Client..."
1999	The Drew Carey Show	Tracy	3 Episodes
1999	Lands of Lore III	Chesara / Jacinda / Morphera (voice)	Video Game
1999	It's Like, You Know...	Cindy	Episode: "Lost in America"
1999–2001	Roswell	Amy DeLuca	Recurring Role (11 Episodes)
2000	The David Cassidy Show	Lisa Erickson	TV Film
2000	Sacrifice	Karen Yeager	TV Film
2000	Secret Agent Man	Trish Fjord	Episode: "The Elders"
2001–02	The Job	Jan Fendrich	Main Cast (19 Episodes)
2002	Superfire	Sammy Kerns	TV Film
2002	CSI: Crime Scene Investigation	Marcie Tobin	Episode: "Cats in the Cradle..."
2002	Arliss	Penny Larson	Episode: "Profiles in Agenting"
2002	Bram & Alice	Tovah	Episode: "Pilot"
2003	The Ripples		TV Film
2003	Harry's Girl		TV Film
2003–04	Like Family	Maddie Hudson	Main Cast (23 Episodes)
2004–05	Rescue Me	Laura Miles	Main Cast (19 Episodes)
2005–08	Numb3rs	Megan Reeves	Main Cast (60 Episodes)
2009	Californication	Jill Robinson	Recurring Role (9 Episodes)
2010	Desperate Housewives	Barbara Orlofsky	Episode: "Epiphany"
2010	White Collar	Gina De Stefano	Episode: "By the Book"
2010	Grey's Anatomy	Lila Davis	Episode: "Can't Fight Biology"
2011	The Council of Dads	Catherine Wells	TV Film
2011	Collision Earth	Victoria Preston	TV Film
2011	CSI: Miami	Marilyn Milner	Episode: "By the Book"
2012	The Mentalist	Amy Barron	Episode: "At First Blush"
2012, 2013	The Secret Life of the American Teenager	Willadean	Recurring Role (5 Episodes)
2012, 2013	Private Practice	Miranda	3 Episodes
2013	Modern Family	Diane	Episode: "Larry's Wife"
2013	Two and a Half Men	Rachel	Episode: "On Vodka, on Soda, on Blender, on Mixer!"
2016–17	Chance	Christina Chance	Recurring Role (12 Episodes)
2018–19	Splitting Up Together	Maya	Main Cast (25 Episodes)
2019	Bluff City Law	Hannah Cosair	Episode: "American Epidemic"
2021	The Good Doctor	Jean Starzac	Episode: "Gender Reveal"
2021	Charmed	Francesca Jameson	3 Episodes
2022	Law and Order: Special Victims Unit	Lola Simenon	Episode: "Video Killed The Radio Star"
2022–present	Fire Country	Sharon Leone	Main Cast
2025–present	Sheriff Country	Sharon Leone	Guest Role (3 Episodes)

== See also ==
- List of atheists in film, radio, television and theater
