= Arrow of Time (Numbers) =

- Numbers episode
- Episode no.: Season 5 Episode 11
- Directed by: Ken Sanzel
- Written by: Ken Sanzel
- Production code: 511
- Original air date: January 9, 2009

Guest appearances
- Gary Basaraba as Joe Thibodeaux; Adam Dunnells as Rafe Lanksy; David Gallagher as Buck Winters; Paul Hipp as Gray McClaughlin; Michelle Nolden as Robin Brooks; Andre Royo as Tim Pynchon; Rusty Schwimmer as Deanne Drake; Jamie Starr as Toby; Quinn Sullivan as Second Marshal

Episode chronology
← Previous "Frienemies"	Next → "Jacked"
- Numbers season 5

"Arrow of Time" is the 11th episode of the fifth season of the American television show Numbers. In the episode, Federal Bureau of Investigation (FBI) agents track an escaped prisoner who is seeking revenge against one of their own. Written by series writer/executive producer Ken Sanzel, the episode continued two storylines. The first storyline continued one that began with two episodes shown very early in season three ("Spree" and "Two Daughters"). The other was originally launched in the season four season finale "When Worlds Collide".

"Arrow of Time" first aired in the United States on January 9, 2009.

== Plot summary ==
While Dr. Charlie Eppes (David Krumholtz), a CalSci math professor/FBI math consultant, rehearses a lecture on entropy and his brother, FBI Special Agent Don Eppes (Rob Morrow), is at temple, federal prisoner Buck Winters (David Gallagher) escapes from prison along with two other prisoners. As Winters and his fellow escapees are federal prisoners, the Los Angeles Police Department calls FBI Special Agents David Sinclair (Alimi Ballard) and Nikki Betancourt (Sophina Brown) to the scene of an abandoned car and hands the FBI agents a rope made from dental floss. David explains to Nikki that, two years prior, Buck's wife, Crystal Hoyle, kidnapped fellow FBI Special Agent Megan Reeves (Diane Farr). Don allowed Buck to be tortured in order to learn Megan and Crystal's location. At a briefing at the FBI office, Don acts as though he is not bothered by the news of Buck's escape. Don's girlfriend, Assistant United States Attorney Robin Brooks (Michelle Nolden), becomes worried about Don as the case should be personal to him. FBI Special Agent Liz Warner (Aya Sumika), who knew only about Megan's kidnapping and had learned about Don's actions from FBI Special Agent Colby Granger (Dylan Bruno), confronts Don about his actions. David and Liz take the rope to CalSci to be analyzed by Charlie and Drs. Amita Ramanujan (Navi Rawat) and Larry Fleinhardt (Peter MacNicol), Charlie's friends and fellow FBI consultants. When Charlie and Larry learn of Buck's escape, Charlie is surprised, as Don had not told Charlie about the escape. Larry is visibly upset as Megan was his girlfriend at the time of her kidnapping.

Charlie's calculations reveal that the prison break had been planned for months and that someone outside of the prison had to supply the dental floss. Colby and Nikki bring the girlfriend of one of the prisoners in for questioning. The girlfriend points to a friend of the prisoner's cellmate. David and Colby question the friend, who denies any knowledge of Buck or the floss. Meanwhile, Robin confides to Larry that she wishes that Buck would be found dead, and Larry tells Robin what he was thinking when Megan was kidnapped. Don and Charlie's father, Alan Eppes (Judd Hirsch), confronts Don about his recent behavior. Don confesses that he fears having to kill Buck in a confrontation. Charlie analyzes Buck's movements and realizes that Buck is after Don. At the FBI office, Charlie confronts Don, who is reviewing a tape of the Crystal Hoyle shooting. They discuss the ability to control a situation. Charlie tells Don that Don has to focus on the present since he cannot change the past. As Charlie leaves, Don receives a phone call from Buck.

David, Colby, Nikki, and Liz find one of the escaped prisoners dead at a hotel. While discussing the development, they learn that Don had called Buck. Later, David, Colby, Nikki, and Liz arrest the accomplice. As Don and David prepare to arrest Buck, David confronts Don about Don's recent actions. Don gives David two options: report Don or trust him. Unarmed, Don confronts Buck at Don's synagogue. Don learns that Buck, thinking that his arrest disappointed Crystal, wants Don to kill him. Don explains that he had to shoot Crystal and that the decision has haunted him for some time. The team, who has been positioned around the synagogue, arrests Buck without firing a shot. Robin, who has been outside during Buck's arrest, enters the synagogue and finds Don leafing through a copy of the Tanakh. Meanwhile, Alan, Charlie, Amita, and Larry discuss Don's predicament during a discussion about forming a think tank. Charlie realizes that he contradicted himself while at Don's office; Charlie felt that the situation was irreversible. Larry uses Maxwell's demon as a metaphor for outside circumstances forcing a change in the situation.

== Production ==
=== Writing ===
Earlier in the series, series creators Nicolas Falacci and Cheryl Heuton demonstrated that the Eppes family was Jewish in the episode "Provenance". They and series regular Rob Morrow wanted to explore the topic of religion. Falacci, Heuton, and other writers felt that discussions about mathematics tend to lead to existential discussions. Morrow felt that a law enforcement officer finding purpose in his work through religion was a rarity on television.

During season five, the writers finally felt that CBS would allow them to explore the topic of religion. The writers thought that Don's spiritual journey would be a natural progression in the storyline. Series executive producer Ken Sanzel decided to use the storyline started in "When Worlds Collide" as the springboard into Don's spiritual search. In the arc, Charlie lost his security clearance when he sent classified information overseas at the end of season four. Season five began with the brothers dealing with the consequences of Charlie's actions. Charlie requested for the FBI to reinstate his clearance. While investigating Charlie, FBI Security Officer Carl McGowan decided to investigate Don. In "Jack of All Trades", Don worked with FBI Special Agent Roger Bloom (Henry Winkler), an agent who stole US$10 million from various banks in order to catch a petty thief who stole US$2000 from Bloom's sister. Since Don had previously violated policy himself in several previous cases, Don's investigation into Bloom paralleled McGowan's investigation into Don. When the assistant director in charge of the Los Angeles FBI field office refused to accept McGowan's recommendations for disciplinary action against Don, Don felt "lost". He then decided to explore Judaism.

For "Arrow of Time", Sanzel continued the story arc about Don's spiritual journey. Sanzel wanted to show the audience that Don was considering religion as a source for some answers to his questions. He set the story against the escape of a prisoner, Buck Winters, portrayed by David Gallagher, who was interrogated by Don in "Two Daughters". In "Two Daughters", FBI Special Agent Megan Reeves (Diane Farr), one of Don's teammates, was kidnapped by Winters' wife, Crystal Hoyle (Kim Dickens). To learn where Crystal took Megan, Don allowed FBI Special Agent Ian Edgerton (Lou Diamond Phillips) to use violent interrogation tactics during Buck's interrogation. Megan was found alive, and Crystal was later killed. Don's actions during Buck's interrogation affected Don throughout season three. In writing "Arrow of Time", Sanzel decided to use Don's decision to arrest Buck at the synagogue as a way of showing that Don was contemplating the effects of religion on his life. According to Morrow in the "Crunching Numb3rs: Season Five" bonus feature, Don's spiritual journey gave Don a new outlook.

== Reception ==
Over 10.14 million people watched "Arrow of Time".
