= Angels and Devils (Numbers) =

- Numbers episode
- Episode no.: Season 5 Episode 23
- Directed by: Alex Zakrzewski
- Written by: Ken Sanzel
- Production code: 523
- Original air date: May 15, 2009

Guest appearances
- James Callis as Mason Duryea; Sarah Drew as Piper St. John; Lou Diamond Phillips as FBI Special Agent Ian Edgerton; Keri Safran as Audrey

Episode chronology
← Previous "Greatest Hits"	Next → "Hangman"
- Numbers season 5

"Angels and Devils" is the 23rd episode and the fifth season finale of the American television show Numbers. In the episode, Federal Bureau of Investigation (FBI) agents search for a mathematician who has been kidnapped by a cult leader. The episode ended with a character's priorities changed and a marriage proposal left unanswered. James Callis guest-starred as the cult leader, Mason Dureya.

"Angels and Devils" first aired in the United States on May 15, 2009. Critics gave the episode positive reviews. Most of them found the episode exciting, and one called the episode "very chilling".

== Plot summary ==
Two people grab Dr. Amita Ramanujan (Navi Rawat) as she and her boyfriend, Dr. Charlie Eppes (David Krumholtz) leave CalSci for dinner. Charlie calls his older brother, FBI Special Agent Don Eppes (Rob Morrow), and when he arrives at CalSci Charlie gives him a description of the getaway van and of Amita's kidnappers. Don and FBI Special Agents Liz Warner (Aya Sumika), Nikki Betancourt (Sophina Brown), David Sinclair (Alimi Ballard), and Colby Granger (Dylan Bruno) begin to search for Amita. With Don and Charlie en route to their location, David and Colby follow the getaway jeep into a parking garage. The getaway jeep crashes into a car and explodes. Believing that Amita is inside the van, Charlie races toward it, only to be tackled by David and Don.

Back at the FBI office, evidence shows that Amita was not in the van when it crashed. When asked to develop the math needed to locate Amita, Charlie is so emotionally upset that he cannot think. Charlie's friend and colleague, Dr. Larry Fleinhardt (Peter MacNicol), arrives at the FBI office and uses the angels and devils problem to describe how the FBI can determine the kidnapper's possible routes based on the FBI's roadblocks and checkpoints. Since the kidnappers avoided the FBI's roadblocks and checkpoints in their escape, the FBI agents can search for Amita in places along a limited number of escape routes. The next day, David, Colby and FBI Special Agent Ian Edgerton (Lou Diamond Phillips) find several pieces of carved wood outside of Amita's office at CalSci. At the FBI office, Ian informs the team that Amita's kidnapper is Mason Dureya (James Callis), who leads a cult consisting of women who possess high school educations. Dureya and his cult are suspected in a series of burglaries and robberies in Oklahoma. This concerns the agents since Amita's college education does not match those of the cult's women. To determine Dureya's motive in kidnapping Amita, Don begins to review previously recorded interrogations with Dureya. Meanwhile, two women escort Amita into Dureya's hideout, where he instructs her to hack into a bank's computer.

At the FBI office, Don and Charlie's father, Alan Eppes (Judd Hirsch), handles a phone call about suspicious charges on Charlie's credit card. Charlie realizes that the charged items are a code from Amita, telling him and the FBI team to watch her office. At CalSci, David and Colby arrest Piper St. John (Sarah Drew), a member of Dureya's cult who arrived to retrieve Amita's notebook computer. Piper refuses to give the agents Dureya and Amita's location. Believing that the carved wood pieces are mathematical clues, Don hands Charlie the wood. Charlie, still emotionally upset, snaps at an empathic Don. Meanwhile, Amita tries to escape, but Dureya stops her attempt.

After David insists that the fraudulent charges' prices are a numerical clue, Charlie realizes that the numbers are an IP address (275.3.60.28) that Amita is using as a mirror site. He also realizes that she wants to create a fake cyberattack on the bank, which holds a large percentage of the nation's debt. The team assumes that Dureya wants anarchy to arise from the bank's collapse. While the team discusses their theory, Larry tells the team that the wood pieces are a Burr puzzle. Don, inspired by the Burr puzzle, persuades Piper to reveal Amita's location. The FBI team and Charlie arrive at Dureya's hideout as Amita launches the "cyberattack". During a shootout with the cult, Amita learns that Dureya wants fame and a confrontation with the FBI, not anarchy. The team rescues Amita, who runs to Charlie. Back at the FBI office, Larry, David, Colby, and Liz celebrate the case's successful resolution while Nikki and Ian leave for a date. Don returns to Charlie's house where Don thanks Alan for the clue; Don and Alan also discuss Don's crisis of faith since his recent stabbing. At CalSci, Charlie proposes to Amita.

== Production ==
=== Writing ===
In separate TVGuide.com interviews, actors Rob Morrow and Alimi Ballard mentioned the season finale was a cliffhanger. Writers chose to end the season with Charlie's proposal to Amita as the cliff-hanger. Numb3rs series regular Navi Rawat told Adam Bryant in a TVGuide.com interview that, in contrast to her other dangerous situations, Amita's kidnapping was unexpected and intense for her. As a result of the incident, Amita reprioritized her life. The storyline continued with Amita's response in the season six season premiere "Hangman", where she accepted his proposal and asked him to keep her response a secret until he asked her father for her hand in marriage. The writers and producers created the resolution since they had earlier established that Amita's family was a traditional Indian family.

=== Casting notes ===
James Callis, previously on Battlestar Galactica, portrayed the cult leader. Seeing it as an opportunity to portray a new character, Callis auditioned for the role of Mason Dureya. A British actor, he had previously played an American twice before, once in the BBC series "A Dance to the Music of Time" and the other in "West End". The director and the producer told Callis that they did not want Dureya to sound too southern. Callis did not research cult leaders but instead chose to derive Dureya's behavior from the episode's dialogue.

== Reception ==
Critically, the episode was very well received. Brian Zoromski, a reviewer at IGN.com, stated that the episode "wasn't going to be a typical episode" and gave "Angels and Devils" a 9.0 rating. Matt Fowler, another reviewer at IGN.com, called the episode "taut". Tim Holland of TVGuide.com called the episode "an emotionally demanding hour". Matt Mitovich, also of TVGuide.com, called the episode "very chilling". Jeffrey Robinson of DVD Talk called "Angels and Devils" "thrilling" and one of "the best" episodes of the season.
