= Numbers season 5 =

Numbers
- Season 5
- DVD cover
- No. of episodes: 23

Release
- Original network: CBS
- Original release: October 3, 2008 – May 15, 2009

Season chronology
- ← Previous; Season 4 Next → Season 6

The fifth season of Numbers, an American television series, first aired on October 3, 2008, and ended on May 15, 2009. The season premiere was moved back one week as a result of the presidential debates.

Season five opens three weeks after the fourth season's finale, "When Worlds Collide", with the government dropping the charges against Charlie. Charlie gets his security clearance back after he and Don fight FBI Security Officer Carl McGowan. Don begins to explore Judaism. The team adds new agent Nikki Betancourt, arriving shortly after Megan Reeve's departure. Liz receives a promotion but turns it down. Buck Winters (from "Spree" and "Two Daughters") breaks out of prison and comes after Don. Alan suddenly finds himself coaching CalSci's basketball team. David becomes Don's primary relief supervisor. DARPA tries to recruit Charlie, but he turns down their offer. Toward the end of the season, Don is stabbed, and Charlie blames himself for it. The aftermath of Don's stabbing causes Charlie to focus more on his FBI consultation work. Amita is kidnapped, and the team race to find her. After she is rescued, Charlie proposes to Amita. Her response is unknown.

== Cast ==
=== Main ===
- Rob Morrow as Don Eppes
- David Krumholtz as Charlie Eppes
- Judd Hirsch as Alan Eppes
- Alimi Ballard as David Sinclair
- Peter MacNicol as Larry Fleinhardt
- Navi Rawat as Amita Ramanujan
- Dylan Bruno as Colby Granger
- Aya Sumika as Liz Warner
- Sophina Brown as Nikki Betancourt

=== Recurring ===
- Lou Diamond Phillips as Agent Ian Edgerton
- Michelle Nolden as AUSA Robin Brooks
- Leslie Silva as M.E. Ridenhour

=== Guest ===
- Wendell Pierce as William Bradford
- Keith Carradine as Carl McGowan
- Teri Reeves as Police Tech
- Morena Baccarin as Lynn Potter
- D.B. Woodside as Jonathan Schmidt
- Henry Winkler as Roger Bloom
- Nora Dunn as Susan Stone
- Dianna Agron as Kelly Rand
- Nick Mennell as Evan Ricci
- Ron Canada as Brian Hellman
- Penn Jillette as himself
- Rutina Wesley as Sarah/Jenny Calandro
- Rachel Roberts as Melissa Conroy
- Ryan Bittle as Pat Drummond
- Lourdes Benedicto as Estella Ramirez
- Josh Gad as Roy McGill
- Paul Michael Glaser as Brett Hanson
- Colin Hanks as Marshall Penfield
- David Gallagher as Buck Winters
- Michael Beach as Len Walsh
- Chris Bruno as Tim King
- Seana Kofoed as Caitlin Dawes
- Chris McGarry as Jack Shuler
- Kelly Hu as Alice Chen
- Bruno Campos Randall Nespola
- Patrick Bauchau as Jean Stephanois
- Eugene Byrd as Vic Moritz
- Eve as La-La Buendia
- Ray Wise as Mitch Langford
- Cynthia Addai-Robinson as Trisha Moreno
- Vivian Bang as Court Clerk
- James Marsters as Damian Lake
- Lorraine Toussaint as Agent Terri Green
- Nancy Travis as Jane Karellen
- Barrett Foa as Andrew Gibbons
- Jillian Armenante as Claire Wells
- Fisher Stevens as John Buckley
- Gina Gershon as Danielle Hill
- Michael Stahl-David as Josh Skinner
- Gina Hecht as Margaret Skinner
- Michael Gaston as Gil Fisher
- Debbon Ayer as Sarah Fisher
- Shannon Cochran as Doctor Iverson
- Delilah Cotto as Karen Cruz
- Brian Howe as Robert Posdner
- Jonathan Adams as Clifford Hansen
- Philip Anthony-Rodriguez as Marcus
- Carlos Sanz as Detective
- Joy Osmanski as File Clerk
- Sarah Drew as Piper St. John
- Amanda Payton as Tipsy Chick

== Episodes ==
No. overall	No. in season	Title	Directed by	Written by	Original release date	Prod. code	US viewers (millions)
80	1	"High Exposure"	Alex Zakrzewski	Nicolas Falacci & Cheryl Heuton	October 3, 2008	501	8.21
Don and his team hunt for the killers of two rock climbers found in possession of a large diamond. Charlie decides he should get his FBI clearance reinstated while a new agent joins the team. Lou Diamond Phillips appears again as FBI tracker and sniper Agent Ian Edgerton; Ben Crowley, Joanna Canton, Myk Watford and Zach McGowan also guest star. First appearance of: Sophina Brown as Nikki Betancourt Mathematics used: Percolation Threshold and geometrical analysis
81	2	"The Decoy Effect"	Ralph Hemecker	Ken Sanzel	October 10, 2008	502	8.01
After a woman is murdered in what appears as an ATM robbery a series of kidnaps, rapes and murders turns into a hunt for the gang leader. New girl Nikki agrees to be the decoy, and Charlie's involvement leads to trouble for Don. Keith Carradine guest stars. Mathematics used: Decoy effect, Hall effect and scheduling algorithm
82	3	"Blowback"	Dennis Smith	Robert Port	October 17, 2008	503	8.68
When eight people, including two LAPD police officers, are executed in a coffee shop, a detective (D. B. Woodside) gets the team on the case, and they uncover a trail of blackmail, romance and corruption. Also, McGowan's (Keith Carradine) investigation of Charlie and Don deepens. Morena Baccarin and Jonathan Silverman also guest star. Mathematics used: Aggregation modeling and Hidden Markov model
83	4	"Jack of All Trades"	Stephen Gyllenhaal	Andrew Dettmann	October 24, 2008	504	9.33
Don's team joins veteran FBI Agent Bloom (Henry Winkler) in tracking an elusive con man (Chuck Hittinger). Meanwhile, decisions are announced on Charlie's FBI clearance and disciplinary action for Don. Keith Carradine, Nora Dunn and Dianna Agron guest star. Mathematics used: Belief propagation
84	5	"Scan Man"	Craig Ross, Jr.	Don McGill	October 31, 2008	505	10.72
The team hunts a crew stealing high-end goods from a shipping service and looks to an employee with savant-like abilities (Ashton Holmes) to lead them to those behind the scheme. Wendell Pierce, Ron Canada, Nick Mennell and Stefan Kapičić guest star. Mathematics used: Geographic network, supply chain analysis and fractals
85	6	"Magic Show"	John Behring	Sean Crouch	November 7, 2008	506	11.28
While on a date, David catches a disappearing act at a magic show but quickly becomes involved in the performance when the magician really vanishes. Magician Penn Jillette guest stars as himself, providing expertise on stage magic. Other guest stars include Lacey Kohl, Rutina Wesley, and Richard Libertini. Mathematics used: Design Recovery
86	7	"Charlie Don't Surf"	Emilio Estevez	Steve Hawk	November 14, 2008	507	9.29
One of Don and Charlie's childhood friends (played by professional surfer Brad Gerlach) dies in what is deemed an accident while surfing. Not convinced, the brothers investigate further at the behest of the victim's father Kevin Tighe. Rachel Roberts and Brad Hunt also guest star. Mathematics used: Deconvolution, neural network, hyperspectral imaging and site-prediction modeling
87	8	"Thirty-Six Hours"	Rod Holcomb	Julie Hébert	November 21, 2008	508	11.30
The team is sent to investigate and help with the recovery at a train crash; however, the train is carrying dangerous chemicals. Guest stars include Antonio Fargas, Lourdes Benedicto and Tony Amendola. Note: During its original run, David Krumholtz gave a public service announcement stating that the episode was not in fact based on a similar train crash in the California area that occurred after taping, but before the episode aired. Mathematics used: Infotaxis and swarm robotics
88	9	"Conspiracy Theory"	Dennis Smith	Robert Port	December 5, 2008	509	9.88
A bomb goes off during a high profile meeting and a documentary film maker (Josh Gad) has a conspiracy theory about it. Paul Michael Glaser and Jeff Kober also guest star. Mathematics used: Simpson's paradox, Rationality theorem
89	10	"Frienemies"	Steve Boyum	Nicolas Falacci & Cheryl Heuton	December 19, 2008	510	9.18
Charlie and his rival Marshall Penfield (Colin Hanks) race against time to stop a vigilante group and the violent gang they're targeting. Tony Curran also guest stars. Mathematics used: Group Dynamics and Three Way Duel
90	11	"Arrow of Time"	Ken Sanzel	Ken Sanzel	January 9, 2009	511	10.14
Buck Winters (David Gallagher) escapes from prison, consumed by getting revenge against Don, forcing Don to face his past and turn to his new-found religious beliefs. Gary Basaraba and Rusty Schwimmer guest star. Mathematics used: Hidden Markov model, Maxwell's demon and the Viterbi algorithm
91	12	"Jacked"	Stephen Gyllenhaal	Don McGill	January 16, 2009	512	11.02
When 18 tourists on a bus are taken hostage, the team has only four hours to stop the hijackers. Fisher Stevens, Michael Beach, Chris Bruno, Chris McGarry and Seana Kofoed guest star. Mathematics used: Articulate and Inverse Game Theory
92	13	"Trouble In Chinatown"	Julie Hébert	Peter MacNicol	January 23, 2009	513	10.96
An undercover agent disappears, leading the FBI team deep into Chinatown's black market. The FBI gets help from the returning psychic Simon Kraft (John Glover). Other guest stars include Kelly Hu and Keone Young. Mathematics used: Digital signal processing and Lévy flight
93	14	"Sneakerhead"	Emilio Estevez	Aaron Rahsaan Thomas	February 6, 2009	514	10.30
When a pair of valuable sneakers is stolen from the vault of a foreign diplomat (Bruno Campos), the team delves into the world of sneaker collecting. Patrick Bauchau, Eve, Eugene Byrd and Bruno Campos guest star. Mathematics used: Pinball
94	15	"Guilt Trip"	Gwyneth Horder-Payton	Mary Leah Sutton	February 13, 2009	515	9.10
When Robin's (Michelle Nolden) seemingly bulletproof case fails and a dangerous weapons smuggler is released, the team investigates the possibility of jury tampering. James Marsters and Ray Wise guest star. Mathematics used: Probability, Mersenne twister, scientific jury selection and social networking potential
95	16	"Cover Me"	Rob Morrow	Andrew Dettmann	February 27, 2009	516	9.62
Liz goes undercover in an operation to stop a new illegal drug from hitting the streets after Charlie predicts that the drug in question will be the next "big thing" to hit the drug market. During the operation, David is assigned to be Liz's handler but he grows concerned for her safety after she ignores his plan and begins trusting a fellow undercover agent who may or may not be an addict himself. Eion Bailey, Lorraine Toussaint and Don Harvey guest star. Mathematics used: Supply & Demand Theory
96	17	"First Law"	Steve Boyum	Sean Crouch	March 6, 2009	517	10.12
The FBI team investigates the death of visionary scientist Daniel Robertson; the prime suspect is Robertson's AI computer program, while Charlie considers an enticing job offer. Guest stars include Nancy Travis, Liane Balaban, and Adam Godley. Mathematics used: Turing test
97	18	"12:01 AM"	Ralph Helmecker	Robert Port	March 13, 2009	518	9.51
The FBI team rushes to track down evidence that could save a mob boss (James Russo) from the death penalty. New information comes in that could exonerate him, leaving the team with only hours to run down the new lead. Gina Gershon and Daniel Bess guest star; Los Angeles Lakers players Pau Gasol and Jordan Farmar appear as ringers when Charlie has his first game coaching CalSci's woeful basketball team. Mathematics used: Light Refraction and Voice Analysis
98	19	"Animal Rites"	Ron Garcia	Julie Hébert	April 10, 2009	519	9.80
The investigation into the death of a CalSci professor exposes possible links to animal rights extremists. Polly Walker, Michael Stahl-David and Gina Hecht guest star.
99	20	"The Fifth Man"	Ken Sanzel	Don McGill	April 24, 2009	520	8.82
Things go terribly wrong when Don gets injured during an investigation. Charlie and Alan have to put things into perspective, when the thought of possibly having to lose a part of their family comes to face them.
100	21	"Disturbed"	Dennis Smith	Nicolas Falacci & Cheryl Heuton	May 1, 2009	521	9.70
Charlie focuses his attention on tracking a previously undetected serial killer to help deal with his guilt over Don's almost-fatal stabbing. He receives help from a geeky amateur sleuth and a retired accountant, who each research serial murders as a hobby. The investigation reveals that the killer may be responsible for over two dozen unsolved deaths. Josh Gad reappears in his previous role as a conspiracy theorist. John Rubinstein, Matthew Yang King and Brian Howe also guest star.
101	22	"Greatest Hits"	Stephen Gyllenhaal	Andrew Dettmann	May 8, 2009	522	9.57
The team investigates a string of bank robberies and believe that ex-FBI Agent Roger Bloom (played by returning guest star Henry Winkler) is responsible for them. The episode then ends with Amita being abducted at gunpoint as she and Charlie leave CalSci.
102	23	"Angels and Devils"	Alex Zakrzewski	Ken Sanzel	May 15, 2009	523	9.72
With Amita having been kidnapped by the leader of a cult (James Callis) with female followers, the whole team including Ian Edgerton (Lou Diamond Phillips in his recurring role) race against the clock to bring Amita home safely before it's too late. Mathematics used: Angel problem and burr puzzle
