= Thirty-Six Hours =

- Numbers episode
- Episode no.: Season 5 Episode 8
- Directed by: Rod Holcomb
- Written by: Julie Hébert
- Original air date: November 21, 2008

Guest appearances
- Tony Amendola as Roman Markovius; Randall Arney as Richard Cory; Lourdes Benedicto as Estella Ramirez; Johnny Chavez as Ralph Ramirez; Larry Clarke as James Malin; Tavis Danz as Doug Abbott; Antonio Fargas as Jeffrey Knight; Kahlil Joseph as Cutty Nagim; Robert Neary as Ed Clark; Mark Pellegrino as Tim Hamer; Philip Pinto as William Ramirez

Episode chronology
← Previous "Charlie Don't Surf"	Next → "Conspiracy Theory"
- Numbers season 5

"Thirty-Six Hours" is the eighth episode of the fifth season of the American television show Numbers. In the episode, Federal Bureau of Investigation (FBI) and mathematicians attempt to determine the cause of a fatal train accident while several agents attempt to rescue survivors. When it was originally scheduled to air as the fourth episode of the season, "Thirty-Six Hours" occurred in the middle of a story arc launched by the season four season finale. When the real-life Chatsworth train derailment occurred two weeks after filming the episode, the accident forced a revision of the script to include episodic events that occurred after the end of the story arc.

To simulate both the crash and the rescue effort, series production designer Bill Eigenbrodt and Numb3rs art department had to build two sets, the inside of a crushed railcar and a tent in which first responders coordinated the rescue effort. Eigenbrodt and his production crew also had to simulate the actual wreckage using real railcars placed along a stretch of open track. Eigenbrodt and the production crew also had to design the robots that appear in the episode.

"Thirty-Six Hours" first aired in the United States on November 21, 2008. Critics gave the episode a positive review.

== Plot summary ==
A freight train and a passenger train collide with each other. Several people on the passenger train are killed, and others are trapped in the wreckage. Suspecting terrorism, the National Transportation Safety Board (NTSB) calls FBI Special Agents Don Eppes (Rob Morrow), David Sinclair (Alimi Ballard), Colby Granger (Dylan Bruno), and Nikki Betancourt (Sophina Brown) to the scene. Don leaves David and Colby at the scene to rescue survivors while he and Nikki talk to a conductor who had jumped out of the train before it crashed. Nikki attempts to tie the conductor's deceased crew-mate, who stayed on the crashing train trying to apply the brakes and has Syrian origin, to a terrorist plot. Don feels that the wreck was unrelated to terrorist activities. At CalSci, Dr. Charlie Eppes (David Krumholtz), Don's younger brother and an FBI math consultant, demonstrates a group of swarmbots, robots which can gather information using infotaxis, the use of information to create a map of the robots' environment, to Don and their father, Alan Eppes (Judd Hirsch). Charlie tells Don the swarmbots could map the wreck in order to find survivors.

Charlie arrives at the crash site and inserts the swarmbots into the wreckage. At the FBI office, Don calls Dr. Amita Ramanujan (Navi Rawat), Charlie's girlfriend and a fellow FBI consultant, to determine whether mechanical failure caused the crash. Don and Nikki question several other people, including a former member of the mob who is now a legitimate businessman, the freighter train's owner, and a rail master. Back at the crash site, David and Colby pull a woman out alive. She is concerned about her asthmatic son, who was with her at the time of the crash. The mother calls her son's cell phone, and she and David talk to the boy for a while to keep him calm. Amita finds that two switches must be thrown in order for a train to switch tracks. Upon a suggestion from Alan, Amita realizes that someone threw the second switch a few minutes too late. Don calls the rail master back in for questioning. During the interview, Don learns that the rail master has had a lack of sleep and left his post a couple of minutes before the crash to rouse himself.

Back at the crash site, David loses contact with the boy. Movement inside the railcar crushes the swarmbots, leaving Charlie without a visual of the inside of the railcar. Impatient with Charlie, David enters the railcar with the boy's inhaler. Don arrives at the scene as Colby enters the wreckage after David. David and Colby find the boy and a rail worker who has been with the boy since the crash alive and rescue them. Charlie realizes that the freight train's momentum should have stopped it. Don learns that the freight train's owner misrepresented the train's weight, and Don and Nikki then arrest the owner.

== Production ==
=== Filming ===
Series production designer Bill Eigenbrodt and the crew found a private track about 30 minutes outside of Los Angeles which contained a bowl. The crew found a place along an open track in which to stage the wreck. Working in a berm, they spent several days planning and setting up the wreck, which consisted of 18 cars. Using a crane, Eigenbrodt and the art crew spent two days arranging the cars to give the appearance of a train wreck.

Eigenbrodt and director Rod Holcomb used several techniques to convey a sense of urgency. Eigenbrodt and the art department built the tanker in the episode, and Eigenbrodt placed the tanker in the valley. Holcomb also used shots of the city. At the site, smoke from the crash conveyed the sense of danger both at night and during the day.

To film the train crash, Numb3rs cinematographer Ron Garcia used handheld Panasonic P2s and handheld digital cameras. They used a tinted car and a moving camera to create the illusion that the train was moving along the track at night. It took the production crew three nights to film the night scenes.

The realistic setup of the wreck upset the cast and the crew. Several of the actors were alarmed by the site of the crash. The site frightened Holcomb, and he became concerned about the actors' safety inside the cars once filming started. Eigenbrodt built a set on the Numb3rs soundstage at the LA Center Studio for the actors to climb through. He and the art department found and used metal to simulate the inside of the damaged car. Once safety officials deemed the wreckage in the field safe for the actors, Eigenbrodt and Holcomb decided to let the actors climb through the wreckage at the site.

Due to time constraints in the production schedule, the crew set up a tent in the field and built a similar set at the studio's soundstage. To maintain a sense of realism, several area firefighters and paramedics assisted with the technical aspects of the rescue. The crew bought the supplies needed at the crash site from emergency suppliers.

The art department designed the swarmbots used in the episode. They place electronic circuitry on top of several remote-controlled cars. During filming, six people operated the cars. Later, to simulate the movement of the bots through the crash site, the art department attached candlecams to sticks with wheels.

=== Writing ===
"Thirty-Six Hours" was originally scheduled to air fourth, placing it in the middle of the storyline about Charlie's security clearance. In the original script, Charlie volunteered at the scene with his friend and fellow FBI consultant Dr. Larry Fleinhardt (Peter MacNicol). Two days before filming, series regular Peter MacNicol had to leave the set due to an emergency, causing writers to rewrite MacNicol's part for Krumholtz. In the script that was filmed, Don expressed doubts about staying with the FBI. Alan suggested that Don was being investigated because he was not interested in office politics. Don then told Alan that he threatened to quit the FBI if Charlie did not get his clearance back. Charlie walked in as Don received the phone call about the train crash. Later at CalSci, Charlie explained to Alan how the college's swarmbots operated. Don, looking for Amita, walked in on Alan and Charlie's conversation. After Alan left to see the swarmbots enter Charlie's office, Charlie confronted Don about Don's avoidance of Charlie. Don tried to pass it off as a national security issue but then tells Charlie about the crash. When the brothers reached Charlie's office, Charlie persuaded Don to allow Charlie's assistance in the investigation by mentioning that many people assisting investigators at the site lacked security clearances. While Amita attempted to discover the cause of the crash, Alan expressed concern about Charlie being punished for helping investigators without a security clearance. Amita reassured Alan that Charlie would not because the wreck was not a national security issue. After the arrest and the cleanup, Don thanked Charlie for helping out with the investigation. Don then told Charlie about Don leaving the FBI if Charlie did not receive his clearance. Charlie decided not to pursue the reinstatement of his clearance any further. Don reminded Charlie of Don's own recent ethical violations and insisted that loyalty to Charlie was the right thing to do.

Writer Julie Hébert built the use of a clock into the script. The use of a clock was rare for Numb3rs. The plot device had been used once before in the episode "One Hour", written by Ken Sanzel. For "One Hour", Sanzel felt that using a real-time therapy session would be an interesting way to tell a story. When writing the episode, he structured the case around the therapy session.

The description of the train switches came from how airports determine whether a flight is on time.

=== Post-production ===
Two weeks after filming the episode, the Chatsworth train accident occurred.

Due to the similarities between the real-life wreck and the crash depicted in the episode, CBS delayed airing the episode. To include the reinstatement of Charlie's clearance in the script, editors had to cut several scenes referring to Charlie volunteering at the scene. For the Numb3rs season five DVDs, the editors created a bonus feature containing the deleted scenes. Feeling that the audience would assume that the episode was written after the Chatsworth crash, the producers added a disclaimer stating that the episode was filmed before the real-life events.

== Reception ==
Jeffrey Robinson of DVD Talk highlighted "Thirty-Six Hours" in his list of "exciting episodes".
