= Numbers season 2 =

Numbers
- Season 2
- DVD cover
- No. of episodes: 24

Release
- Original network: CBS
- Original release: September 23, 2005 – May 19, 2006

Season chronology
- ← Previous; Season 1 Next → Season 3

The second season of Numbers, an American television series, premiered on September 23, 2005, and its season finale was on May 19, 2006. Season two sees several changes to Don's FBI team: Terry Lake is reassigned to Washington DC and two new members join Don and David Sinclair: Megan Reeves and Colby Granger. Charlie is challenged on one of his long-standing pieces of mathematical work and also starts work on a new theory, Cognitive Emergence Theory. Larry sells his home and lives a nomadic lifestyle, while he becomes romantically involved with Megan. Amita receives an offer for an assistant professor position at Harvard University but is plagued by doubt as her relationship with Charlie is challenged and her career is in upheaval. Alan begins working and dating again, though he struggles with the loss of his wife.

== Cast ==
=== Main ===
- Rob Morrow as Don Eppes
- David Krumholtz as Charlie Eppes
- Judd Hirsch as Alan Eppes
- Alimi Ballard as David Sinclair
- Navi Rawat as Amita Ramanujan
- Diane Farr as Megan Reeves
- Peter MacNicol as Larry Fleinhardt

=== Recurring ===
- Dylan Bruno as Colby Granger
- Lou Diamond Phillips as Ian Edgerton
- Sarah Carter as Nadine Hodges
- Colin Hanks as Marshall Penfield
- Michelle Nolden as Robin Brooks
- Will Patton as Detective Gary Walker

=== Guest ===
- Alan Rosenberg as Judge Franklin Trelane
- Jordi Vilasuso as Gabriel Ruiz
- Christian Clemenson as Henry Korfelt
- Elizabeth Peña as Sonya Benavides
- Scott Cohen as James Grace
- Christina Chang as Val Eng
- Melinda Page Hamilton as Jennifer Nash
- John Heard as Peter Houseman
- Cynthia Preston as Mrs. McHugh
- Kate Burton as Anthropologist
- Clyde Kusatsu as Antiquities Dealer
- Mark Damon Espinoza as Frank Lopez
- Sophina Brown as Bianca Styles
- Tamara Taylor as Olivia Rawlings
- Taylor Cole as Brandi
- Kirk Acevedo as Gino McGinty
- Robert Forster as Agent Thomas Larson
- Patrick J. Adams as Adam Bennett
- Leighton Meester as Karen Camden
- Christine Estabrook as Laura Price
- Craig Zimmerman as Dave Taggart
- Andrew Leeds as Daniel
- Lauren Velez as Claudia Gomez
- Matt Roth as Mike Belweather
- JoBeth Williams as Margaret Eppes

== Episodes ==
No. overall	No. in season	Title	Directed by	Written by	Original release date	Prod. code	US viewers (millions)
14	1	"Judgment Call"	Alex Zakrzewski	Ken Sanzel	September 23, 2005	201	11.18
When the wife of a judge (Alan Rosenberg) is shot dead while arriving into her parking garage, Don and his team look into the judge's cases to determine if one of his verdicts led to the murder. First appearance of: Diane Farr as Megan Reeves and Dylan Bruno as Colby Granger Mathematics used: Scatter plot, Bayesian spam filtering, Buffon's needle problem and conditional probability
15	2	"Better or Worse"	J. Miller Tobin	Andrew Dettman	September 30, 2005	202	11.83
Don and his team are called in when a woman attempting to rob a jewelry store in Beverly Hills is shot by a security guard. Mathematics used: Von Neumann cellular automata, Farey sequence and pseudo-random numbers
16	3	"Obsession"	John Behring	Robert Port	October 7, 2005	203	11.40
The FBI becomes involved in the stalking of a popular singer (Samaire Armstrong) after she is threatened by an intruder in her house and reveals a series of threatening letters she has received through the mail. Charlie receives an anonymous love letter from someone other than Amita. Mathematics used: Trigonometry, curvelet analysis, Forensic Information System for Handwriting (FISH), spherical astronomy and art gallery problem
17	4	"Calculated Risk"	Bill Eagles	J. David Harden	October 14, 2005	204	11.09
Don and Megan are called to the murder scene when the CFO of a powerful energy company—who was about to testify against her fellow executives—is murdered at her home and her son is the only witness. Guest stars include Jeff Perry, Raphael Sbarge and Josh Eriksson. Mathematics used: Conditional probability and compound interest
18	5	"Assassin"	Bobby Roth	Nicolas Falacci & Cheryl Heuton	October 21, 2005	205	11.17
Along with David Sinclair and new FBI Agent Colby Granger, Don discovers a secret code during a raid and enlists Charlie's help to crack it. Charlie cancels his date with Amita only to discover she already made other plans for that night. Guest stars include Elizabeth Peña and Christian Clemenson. Mathematics used: Transposition cipher, game theory and paper planes
19	6	"Soft Target"	Andy Wolk	Don McGill	November 4, 2005	206	11.13
A week-long series of counter-terrorism exercises are put to the test by Homeland Security officials (John Heard and Scott Cohen) in Los Angeles, but the first one is violated by someone who releases a potentially lethal gas in the subway system. Alan hosts a wedding for a girl (Christina Chang) from the Eppes brothers' past. Mathematics used: Percolation theory and diffusion
20	7	"Convergence"	Dennis Smith	Nicolas Falacci & Cheryl Heuton	November 11, 2005	207	12.36
Don investigates a series of home invasions in which the thieves steal only high-end items from wealthy individuals. Meanwhile, an old adversary (Colin Hanks as recurring character Marshall Penfield) challenges Charlie's breakthrough work, The Eppes Convergence. Mathematics used: Group theory, data-mining, Fourier analysis, calendars, Three-dimensional trilateration, Set theory and projectile motion
21	8	"In Plain Sight"	J. Miller Tobin	Julie Hébert	November 18, 2005	208	12.44
Megan feels personally responsible for an agent's death following an explosion at a house where meth is being illegally produced and that the FBI targeted for a bust but the case takes a new direction after Charlie discovers that the drug kingpin was in the FBI office, looking for help in rescuing his supposedly kidnapped daughter. Mathematics used: Flock behavior, steganography and matrices - error correction code
22	9	"Toxin"	Jefery Levy	Ken Sanzel	November 25, 2005	209	12.67
Don learns that someone is poisoning non-prescription drugs made by a leading pharmaceutical company after four people nearly die from the tampering. Guest stars include Lou Diamond Phillips in the recurring role of FBI fugitive tracker and sniper Ian Edgerton, as well as Connor Trinneer and Cynthia Preston. Mathematics used: Information theory - information entropy, graph theory - Seven Bridges of Königsberg and soap bubble theory with Steiner tree
23	10	"Bones of Contention"	Jeannot Szwarc	Christos Gage & Ruth Fletcher	December 9, 2005	210	12.53
An archaeologist is killed in a museum, and the object she was studying is taken. Guest stars include Graham Greene, Reed Diamond, Michael Greyeyes, Clyde Kusatsu, Kate Burton and Lorraine Toussaint. Mathematics used: Exponential decay and Voronoi diagram
24	11	"Scorched"	Norberto Barba	Sean Crouch	December 16, 2005	211	11.96
An arsonist believed to be part of an extremist environmental group sets a fire at a car dealership that kills a salesman. The group's name is spray painted at the scene and is the fourth such fire, but the first to claim a life. Guest stars include Loren Dean and science educator and television presenter Bill Nye in his first appearance in the recurring role of Charlie's CalSci colleague engineering professor Bill Waldie. First appearance of: Sophina Brown as Bianca Styles, before she is cast as Nikki Betancourt in season five. Mathematics used: Combustion and principal components analysis
25	12	"The OG"	Rod Holcomb	Andrew Dettman	January 6, 2006	212	13.93
When Don and his team are called to the murder scene of a Los Angeles gang member, they learn the victim is a fellow agent who had been working undercover. Guest stars include Will Patton in his first appearance as recurring character LAPD Lt. Gary Walker, Michelle Nolden in her first appearance as recurring character Assistant United States Attorney Robin Brooks, Tamara Taylor and Aldis Hodge. Mathematics used: Poisson distribution and social network analysis
26	13	"Double Down"	Alex Zakrzewski	Don McGill	January 13, 2006	213	12.98
When the FBI is called to investigate a murder at a Los Angeles card club, it leads the agents to unravel a complicated card counting scheme involving a group of college students whose lives may now be at risk. Ethan Phillips guest stars. Mathematics used: Probability involving sampling without replacement, time series analysis and randomization
27	14	"Harvest"	John Behring	J. David Harden	January 27, 2006	214	13.22
A South Asian teenager is found in the blood-spattered basement of an old downtown hotel where she was apparently being tortured. The investigation soon reveals that the girl, along with three other missing women, are victims of a black-market organ-harvesting scheme. David Dayan Fisher guest stars. Mathematics used: Markov chain, ellipses and genetic variation
28	15	"The Running Man"	Terrence O'Hara	Ken Sanzel	February 3, 2006	215	13.31
A DNA synthesizer with the capability of customizing diseases is stolen from the campus where Charlie teaches, and Don figures the thieves may be terrorists out to start or advance a bio-warfare program. Guest stars include Kirk Acevedo and Sara Botsford. Mathematics used: Benford's law, continued fraction, astronomy, and probability
29	16	"Protest"	Dennis Smith	Nicolas Falacci & Cheryl Heuton	March 3, 2006	216	11.94
A pedestrian is killed when a homemade bomb explodes under a car outside of a downtown Army recruiting center. The investigation reveals that a similar bombing that killed two people at a Vietnam War-era ROTC office occurred exactly 35 years earlier, and the retired agent (Robert Forster) that investigated the first bombing becomes part of the current inquiry. Things take a turn when Don discovers that his father was a member of an anti-war group believed to have been associated with the bombings. Other guest stars include Concetta Tomei and Patrick J. Adams. Mathematics used: Graph theory, Ramsey numbers and recursive sequence
30	17	"Mind Games"	Peter Markle	Andrew Dettman	March 10, 2006	217	11.67
When the bodies of three illegal-immigrant women are found on government-owned land in a wilderness area, Don investigates and learns a psychic (John Glover) led the police to the crime scene after allegedly seeing visions of the bodies. Charlie becomes extremely annoyed after learning that Don is using the psychic's help to solve the case, maintaining that true psychics do not exist. Mathematics used: Fokker–Planck equation and Binomial theorem
31	18	"All's Fair"	Rob Morrow	Julie Hébert	March 31, 2006	218	12.09
In an effort to find the murderer of an Iraqi woman, Don enlists the help of the victim's cousin, who lives in Los Angeles. Through her cousin, Don learns information about the woman's disturbing connection to Saddam Hussein, which could lead to her murderer. Meanwhile, Charlie reunites with an ex-girlfriend, a best-seller neuropsychologist (Sonya Walger). Mathematics used: Density, Sudoku, logistic regression and game theory
32	19	"Dark Matter"	Peter Ellis	Don McGill	April 7, 2006	219	13.69
As Don and his team investigate the motive behind two students's deadly school shooting, Charlie uses the school's radio frequency identification system to track the shooters's movements through the school's hallways. But the team are stunned when Charlie reveals that they're looking for a third shooter, someone with motive. Guest stars include Leighton Meester, Christine Estabrook, and Marin Mazzie. Mathematics used: RFID and optimization problem
33	20	"Guns and Roses"	Stephen Gyllenhaal	Robert Port	April 21, 2006	220	12.09
When an ATF agent is found dead amid questionable circumstances, Don demands to take on the case, which revolves around an elaborate bank heist, after he learns the victim is his ex-girlfriend. Michelle Nolden appears in her recurring role of Assistant US Attorney Robin Brooks. Mathematics used: Echolocation and biomathematics (DNA sequence alignment)
34	21	"Rampage"	J. Miller Tobin	Ken Sanzel	April 28, 2006	221	12.32
After an unknown man opens fire in the FBI offices, causing carnage and destruction, Don and his team must investigate his motive and his connection to a dangerous arms dealer who is on trial. Meanwhile, Don soon learns that the bullet that killed the sex offender the team interviewed came from Colby's gun, forcing Colby to be put on desk duty for the time being. Mathematics used: Chaos theory, Brownian motion, Self-organized criticality, Venn diagram and tesseracts/hypercubes
35	22	"Backscatter"	Bill Eagles	Nicolas Falacci & Cheryl Heuton	May 5, 2006	222	12.01
An FBI investigation into a computer hacking scam, which taps into a bank's system to gain access to customer's identities and financial assets, becomes personal for Don when the Russian mob spearheading it comes after him and threatens the safety of Charlie and Alan. Will Patton returns as LAPD Lt. Gary Walker; David Aaron Baker also guest stars. Mathematics used: Explicit and implicit functions, geometric progression and exponential growth. Neil Sloane's Integer Sequence Database was also used.
36	23	"Undercurrents"	J. Miller Tobin	J. David Harden	May 12, 2006	223	12.35
Five young Chinese girls wash up on the shore; while Charlie works out where they came from, it emerges that one of the girls is carrying Avian Flu. Guest stars include Lauren Vélez and Russell Wong. Mathematics used: Encoding, vector fields, kinematics, n-dimensional space and strange loop.
37	24	"Hot Shot"	John Behring	Barry Schindel	May 19, 2006	224	12.72
Two women are found dead with an apparent drug overdose, in similar positions with a syringe in the left arm; Don suspects a serial killer. The investigation reveals valium (diazepam) and morphine. Charlie's help on Don's case is hindered by his bizarre dream about his mother (JoBeth Williams appears as Margaret Eppes). Sam Trammell and Olympia Dukakis also guest star. Mathematics used: Directed graph, parabolic equations, probability and trajectory
