= Disturbed (Numbers) =

- Numbers episode
- Episode no.: Season 5 Episode 21
- Directed by: Dennis Smith
- Written by: Cheryl Heuton, Nicolas Falacci
- Production code: 521
- Original air date: May 1, 2009

Guest appearances
- Creagen Dow as Leonard Philber; Josh Gad as Roy McGill; Brian Howe as Robert Posdner; Anne James as Wife; Dan Martin as Detective Cates; Paul Messenger as Jack; Keith Nobbs as Ralph; Erica Piccininni as Woman; Brett Rickaby as Steve Savard; Daniel Sauli as Mark Horn; John Rubinstein as Gene Evans; Jack Shearer as Peter Evans; Matthew Yang King as Matt Li

Episode chronology
← Previous "The Fifth Man"	Next → "Greatest Hits"
- Numbers season 5

"Disturbed" is the 21st episode of the fifth season of the American television show Numbers. In the episode written by series creators/executive producers Cheryl Heuton and Nicolas Falacci, skeptical Federal Bureau of Investigation (FBI) agents track an undetected serial killer while their math consultant copes with his brother's recent injury. After FBI Special Agent Don Eppes's (Rob Morrow) injury, FBI Special Agent David Sinclair (Alimi Ballard), who was the newest member of the team at the beginning of the series, served as team leader. Falacci and Heuton also included Easter eggs from the "Pilot" and from some of the previous 99 episodes.

The producers brought back one previous guest star and almost had a special guest star. For the 100th episode, series producers brought back Josh Gad, who amazed producers in a previous episode. Dr. Stephen Hawking, who visited the set during filming, almost became a guest star in the episode.

"Disturbed" first aired in the United States on May 1, 2009. Critics generally liked the episode.

== Plot summary ==
A woman is killed in her house in broad daylight. FBI math consultant Dr. Charlie Eppes (David Krumholtz), who has found a temporal pattern in a series of unrelated murders, tells skeptical FBI Special Agents David Sinclair (Alimi Ballard) and Colby Granger (Dylan Bruno) that the murders, including the woman's murder, must be the work of an undetected serial killer with a kill count of almost 70 victims. Charlie's obsession with the serial killer worries David, Colby, and FBI Special Agents Liz Warner (Aya Sumika) and Nikki Betancourt (Sophina Brown), as they suspect that Charlie may be suffering from post-traumatic stress disorder (PTSD). Five days before, Charlie's brother, FBI Special Agent Don Eppes (Rob Morrow), suffered a life-threatening stab wound while investigating a home invasion, and Charlie blamed himself for Don's injury. At Charlie's house, Don, who is there recuperating from his injury, confronts Charlie about his behavior.

The next morning, a postal worker is found murdered near the scene of the previous murder. Since the recent murder does not match the timeline of the other murders, Charlie asks David, the team leader during Don's recovery, for more data. David directs Charlie to Roy McGill (Josh Gad), an amateur police consultant who consulted with the FBI on a previous case involving conspiracy theorists. McGill and Gene Evans (John Rubinstein), a retired accountant/amateur police consultant, identify several unsolved cases in Fresno and Bakersfield, California, which fit Charlie's timeline. FBI technician Matt Li (Matthew Yang King) gives Charlie a copy of Dr. Kim Rossmo's methodology. Using the information from Evans and Li, Charlie realizes that the killer has previously moved twice before arriving in Los Angeles. A couple of days later, Charlie and McGill visit Evans for more data and find Evans and his wife dead. While investigating Evans' murder, the FBI team learns that Evans had a restraining order against Mark Horn (Daniel Sauli), who had been stalking Evans. Upon arrest, Horn asserts that he only wanted Evans to help him appeal an Internal Revenue Service decision that was based on a mistake that Evans made on Horn's tax returns.

Meanwhile, McGill finds another victim, Nancy Kershaw from Stockton, California, whose murder shared commonalities with some of the other victims' murders. He and Dr. Larry Fleinhardt (Peter MacNicol), Charlie's friend and fellow FBI consultant, think that Charlie should consider her murder as the serial killer's first murder. Charlie hesitates, since her murder does not fit into the timeline. After finding no errors in Charlie's logic, Dr. Amita Ramanujan (Navi Rawat), Charlie's girlfriend and a fellow FBI math consultant, informs Don that Charlie is right about the serial killer's existence. At the FBI office, Don and the team figure out that the serial killer is eliminating those who either witnessed and investigated the unsolved murders. Earlier in the investigation, the FBI team learned of the murder of Bakersfield Police Department Detective Driscoll, who investigated the unsolved Bakersfield cases that Evans identified. The witnesses' and investigators' murders showed up as anomalies in Charlie's timeline. At the house, Charlie, Don, and their father, Alan Eppes (Judd Hirsch) reminisce about the brothers' first case. Inspired by his memories of the first case, Charlie applies the mathematical model of hot zones, the locations of the crimes to determine the most likely area where the suspect lives, to the current case. This time, Charlie uses the model to identify several potential targets. As the team surveys the identified targets, the killer strikes one house but escapes when the agents attempt to arrest him.

To narrow the focus of the investigation, Charlie and David compare the social security numbers of the residents in the hot zones with census records. McGill provides the FBI with a crucial clue—years ago, the killer had spoken to Nancy Kershaw's then-boyfriend. The agents find that one man, Robert Posdner (Brian Howe), faked his identity four times during the same time period as the murders. They ask him to come in for questioning. Meanwhile, Kershaw's former boyfriend identifies a modified version of Posdner's voice as the one he heard years ago. The team arrests Posdner at home, and Posdner brags about how he eluded detection for so long. After the case is closed, the brothers are at the house with Alan, Amita, and Larry. Charlie decides to unpack his new office, which he has not started since Don's injury. Don informs Alan that he will be returning to full duty Monday. As the sprinklers go off, the brothers share a laugh before going inside.

== Production ==
=== Writing ===
For "Disturbed", series creators/executive producers Cheryl Heuton and Nicolas Falacci decided to revisit the pilot. In the previous episode "The Fifth Man", Don's stabbing forced David to become the team leader. For "Disturbed", David was still the team leader, a change from his first day on Don's team during the pilot.

Heuton and Falacci included Easter eggs for fans of the series. For example, the physics chair was the Walter T. Merrick chair, named after Walter Merrick (Anthony Heald), the FBI Assistant Director in Charge of the Los Angeles FBI field office and Don's boss in the second pilot. Rossmo and Rooker were two other Easter eggs. Dr. Kim Rossmo developed the criminal geographic targeting model that was featured in the "Pilot". Michael Rooker was cast in the original pilot as an FBI agent but left the series when the pilot was refilmed. Heuton and Falacci also included references to other episodes in the series. When asked about the 100th episode in separate TV Guide interviews, actors Alimi Ballard and Rob Morrow alluded to the Easter eggs.

=== Casting notes ===
For the 100th episode, the writers and producers brought back Josh Gad. They were impressed by his performance in "Conspiracy Theory".

During the filming of "Disturbed", Dr. Stephen Hawking, a fan of the show, surprised the cast and crew with a visit to the set while visiting Los Angeles. He was offered a role on the episode, but, due to issues involving obtaining a work permit on short notice, was unable to appear in the episode.

=== Celebration of 100th episode ===
Temporarily stopping production, the cast and crew celebrated the 100th episode on March 25, 2009. On April 21, 2009, the cast and crew celebrated both the episode and the end of the season at the Sunset Tower Hotel. To celebrate, the press was in attendance.

== Reception ==
Over 9.70 million people watched "Disturbed". Critically, the episode was very well received. Calling the episode "a knotty murder mystery", Tim Holland of TVGuide.com included "Disturbed" in TVGuide.com's Hot List for May 1, 2009. Jeffrey Robinson of DVD Talk stated that McGill's presence in "Disturbed" made the episode interesting.
