= Scorched (Numbers) =

- Numbers episode
- Episode no.: Season 2 Episode 11
- Directed by: Norberto Barba
- Written by: Sean Crouch
- Production code: 211
- Original air date: December 16, 2005

Guest appearances
- Blake Bashoff as Ethan Powell; Susan Beaubian as Stendhauser; Sophina Brown as Bianca Styles; Loren Dean as Paul Stevens; David O. Katz as Sales Person; Bill Nye as Bill Waldie; Sean Smith as Professor; A.J. Trauth as Jake Eckworth; Ian Unterman as Alex Dewitt; Rosalie Ward as Female Student

Episode chronology
← Previous "Bones of Contention"	Next → "The O.G."
- Numbers season 2

"Scorched" is the 11th episode of the second season of the American television series Numbers. Marking the first produced script for series writer Sean Crouch, the episode features Federal Bureau of Investigation (FBI) agents and mathematicians investigating a series of arsons that may have been started by an ecoterrorist group. Bill Nye "The Science Guy", who is a fan of the show, guest stars as a colleague of scientists Dr. Charlie Eppes (David Krumholtz) and Dr. Larry Fleinhardt (Peter MacNicol).

"Scorched" first aired in the United States on December 16, 2005. Critics gave the episode positive reviews.

== Plot summary ==
Arsonists set two fires to a car dealership, one which destroys an SUV and one which kills a salesman. FBI Special Agents Don Eppes (Rob Morrow), David Sinclair (Alimi Ballard), and Colby Granger (Dylan Bruno), as well as Dr. Charlie Eppes (David Krumholtz) (Don's brother and an FBI math consultant), arrive at the scene and learn that an ecoterrorist group is implicated in the arsons. Surprising Don and Charlie, Paul Stevens (Loren Dean), an arson investigator with the Los Angeles Fire Department (LAFD), asks if Charlie could help the LAFD with their investigation. When Colby and FBI Special Agent Megan Reeves (Diane Farr) question the ecoterrorist group's members, the group denies involvement in the arsons and accuses the FBI of making false accusations. The team runs faces in a photo that Colby confiscated at the ecoterrorist group's office through photo recognition software. They discover that a student named Jake Eckworth (A.J. Trauth) appeared at three other arson scenes. Using information given to them by Jake's roommate Ethan Powell (Blake Bashoff), Megan, Colby, and Don track Jake to a construction site. When confronted by the FBI agents, Jake denies setting the fires.

Meanwhile, Charlie and Dr. Larry Fleinhardt (Peter MacNicol), Charlie's friend and colleague, discuss creating a "fireprint", a profile of the fires and the possible motives for them. Using records from the LAFD, Charlie and Larry learn that 17 fires over the past two years match the fireprint for the current fires. They then consult Professor Bill Waldie (Bill Nye) and reconstruct the lethal fire using a scaled model of the car dealership booth and a cigarette. When no reaction occurs, Charlie, Larry, and Bill realize that the fire was intentionally set. Back at Charlie's house, Charlie and Don's father, Alan Eppes (Judd Hirsch), suggests to Charlie and Larry that the fires at the car dealership are two separate fires instead of one fire as Charlie and Larry were considering.

While discussing the case at the FBI office, Don, Megan, Colby, and Charlie learn of a fire at an office building. This time, six firefighters suffer smoke inhalation as there was not enough water in the fire hose to put out the fire. When Ethan is brought in for questioning, he confesses to the fire. At the house, Alan demonstrates Pascal's law to Charlie and Larry, who are confused how a lack of water pressure could occur when the fire equipment registered normal pressure. Charlie determines that someone tampered with the office building's standpipe to create a lack of water pressure. Armed with the new evidence, Megan and Jake convince Ethan, whom Megan believes is innocent of committing the actual arsons, to tell the FBI who had asked for Ethan's help. Using Ethan's chat room account, which was obtained earlier in the investigation, the team traces Ethan's chat to a LAFD station. Charlie's analysis of the fires confirms the location and reveals that Stevens was behind all of the related arsons, including the fatal one at the car dealership. The team learns that Stevens was taking revenge on the LAFD as the LAFD rejected his application to be a firefighter years earlier. Don and the team confront Stevens at the same construction site where they confronted Jake. During the confrontation, Stevens attempts to escape, but accidentally bangs his head and an explosion occurs due to him carrying combustible white phosphorus, killing Stevens. At Charlie's house, Don breaks the news to Charlie and Alan that Ethan has accepted a plea deal in which Ethan would serve three year's prison time. Charlie, who had earlier in the investigation talked with Ethan about the difficulties of being child prodigies, confides in his father and brother that he possibly could have done the same things that Ethan has done.

== Production ==
=== Writing ===
"Scorched" was series writer Sean Crouch's first produced television script. Originally from Colorado, Crouch knew of the Earth Liberation Front's (ELF's) involvement of the fires at Vail and based the ELM, the ecoterrorist group in the episode, on the real-life ELF.

In developing the script, Crouch asked for assistance from people he knew. He asked a couple of Colorado arson investigators for assistance with the script. He also asked his family, as they were engineers, for ideas about engineering projects, especially nanotubes. His wife suggested using Jake's hat as a clue, and Crouch's childhood experiments inspired the final scene where Alan attempted to clean up Charlie and Larry's earlier experiment in the bathroom. As a result of his college science classes, Crouch included several experiments in the script. In the commentary for "Scorched", Crouch admitted that the most difficult part of writing the script was keeping the plot twist hidden from the audience.

As for the math, Crouch included two known equations. He mentioned Michael Faraday's The Natural History of the Candle since the episode was about fire. He also utilized Dr. Vytenis Babrauskas' equations for some of the equations on the markerboards in the episode. He also decided to include Leopold and Loeb as a part of Megan's profiling training.

The events of this episode bear some resemblance to the case of William Cottrell, a former Ph.D. candidate at Caltech who was convicted in April 2005 of conspiracy to arson of 8 sport utility vehicles and a Hummer dealership in the name of the Earth Liberation Front. Numb3rs has filmed many episodes at Caltech (including this episode), and Caltech faculty have worked on the show as technical advisors.

=== Filming ===
Norberto Barba directed the episode. Since the episode was about arson, he included several shots of fires being ignited. Incidentally, all of the flames ignited during takes instead of being edited in later, an event that rarely happens in television production. Barba also included three instances where the FBI team had to walk through either their bullpen (the desks at the FBI office) or the construction site. In the case of the walks through the construction site, the filming was for dramatic effect.

Barba and the crew filmed at several locations around the Los Angeles area. They filmed in the dormitories and near the campus of the California Institute of Technology (Caltech) and at the building behind the LA Center Studios building, the building where Numb3rs was usually filmed. Barba and the crew also spent a day filming at a construction site in the Simi Valley. The site was selected as a visual representation of a wilderness that was about to be developed. Since filming the daytime scenes at the site went very quickly, the crew changed the location of Jake's interrogation from the FBI office to the site to use the remaining time until the filming of the night scene. Barba and the crew also built the set serving as the Eppes family's bathroom especially for the episode.

=== Casting notes ===
According to series creators Cheryl Heuton and Nicolas Falacci, Bill Nye served as an inspiration for both Numb3rs and for the character of Dr. Charlie Eppes. After reading Heuton and Falacci's claim about him in Wired Magazine in the spring of 2005, Nye, a fan of the series, had a breakfast meeting with the series creators and discussed science. Nye guest starred as a CalSci combustion engineering professor. While filming the episode, Nye convinced producers to let him include an explanation of backdrafts. After his guest appearance, he wanted to return for another episode.

Also, "Scorched" was the first appearance of actress Sophina Brown in the series. In the episode, she portrayed a leader in the ELM. During season five, she was cast as series regular FBI Special Agent Nikki Betancourt. After casting her, casting director Mark Saks learned of her earlier appearance on the series.

== Reception ==
Critically, the episode received a positive reception. Angel Cohn of TVGuide.com stated that the episode was "pretty fun to watch" and had "plenty of fun stuff". Cynthia Boris of DVD Verdict called "Scorched" a "tight episode".
