= Spree (Numbers) =

- Numbers episode
- Episode no.: Season 3 Episode 1
- Directed by: John Behring
- Written by: Ken Sanzel
- Production code: 301
- Original air date: September 22, 2006

Guest appearances
- Colin Campbell as Meth chemist; Kim Dickens as Crystal Hoyle; David Gallagher as Buck Winters; Georgia Hatzis as Lydia Campos; Lou Diamond Phillips as FBI Special Agent Ian Edgerton; Andy Mackenzie as Felix; Jerry D. O'Donnell as Pierce Brenner; Anthony Vitale as Diner Cook

Episode chronology
← Previous "Hot Shot"	Next → "Two Daughters"
- Numbers season 3

"Spree" is the first episode of the third season of the American television show Numbers The episode features Federal Bureau of Investigation (FBI) agents pursuing a couple of spree killers. Series writer Ken Sanzel drew inspiration for the episode from pursuit curves. "Spree" also launches a more general trend toward the serialization of the series.

David Gallagher and Kim Dickens guest-starred as the couple. For Gallagher, the role of Buck Winters was a sharp contrast with his role in a previous series. Lou Diamond Phillips, reprising his role of FBI Special Agent Ian Edgerton, made his third appearance on Numb3rs.

"Spree" first aired in the United States on September 22, 2006. Critics gave the episode positive reviews.

== Plot summary ==
A recently married couple, Buck Winters (David Gallagher) and Crystal Hoyle (Kim Dickens), shoot the people inside a convenience store outside of Los Angeles, California and drive off in a stolen a convertible. Some time later, FBI Special Agent Ian Edgerton (Lou Diamond Phillips) informs FBI Special Agents Don Eppes (Rob Morrow), Megan Reeves (Diane Farr), David Sinclair (Alimi Ballard), and Colby Granger (Dylan Bruno) that Crystal and Buck have been on a 17-day robbery spree from Texas to Los Angeles. Don and Ian take a map to CalSci and ask Dr. Charlie Eppes (David Krumholtz), Don's brother and an FBI math consultant, for assistance. Charlie gets an idea that Ian missed a shooting in Wyoming. At the office, the team learns that Crystal was Buck's high school teacher and that they killed Buck's father before beginning their robbery spree. A call stating that Crystal and Buck were involved in a shootout in a Wyoming bar confirms Charlie's suspicion and fills in a gap in the timeline. A background check reveals that Crystal, along with her friend Lydia Campos (Georgia Hatzis), was arrested for drug possession in Los Angeles at age 15. Meanwhile, Buck and Crystal drive into a downtown car dealership belonging to Pierce Brenner (Jerry D. O'Donnell). Brenner recognizes Crystal, and she shoots him. After arriving on the scene, Megan realizes that Crystal and Buck's actions have been changing since Ian started following them.

Meanwhile, Alan Eppes (Judd Hirsch), Don and Charlie's father, contemplates moving into a condo, citing privacy issues and the need to invest the money from the sale of the house. Also, Dr. Amita Ramanujan (Navi Rawat) tells Charlie that she is accepting the CalSci associate professor's position extended to her some time earlier, enabling Charlie and Amita to start dating. While telling his friend and colleague Dr. Larry Fleinhardt (Peter MacNicol) about these changes and the idea about the Wyoming shooting, Charlie becomes inspired to use pursuit curves to model Crystal and Buck's as well as Ian's movements throughout the western United States. The team stakes out Campos' house and learns through a wiretap that Crystal is going to a meth house. Buck and Crystal grab some grenades and blow up the meth house.

Crystal calls Campos again, and Campos tries to talk Crystal out of leaving a bag of drugs and cash outside Campos' house. Unwilling to let Crystal kill Campos, David and Colby take Campos into custody. At the FBI office, Campos tells them that Brenner was connected to the meth dealers and that Billy Rivers, Crystal's boyfriend after her relationship with Brenner, was charged along with Crystal and Campos. Charlie assumes that Crystal and Buck are after something else, and the team realizes that Crystal wants to eliminate anyone and anything connected to her past "mistakes". This makes Rivers a target, and the team race to find him.

After narrowing down the number of places where Rivers could be, the team stakes out the house of Rivers' cousin. Ian cautions Megan about not letting Crystal's background influence Megan's perception of the case. Buck arrives, and Ian shoots Buck in the wrist. Buck is then taken to jail. Megan meets Larry at an all-night café for an early breakfast, and they discuss Megan's own decision to leave home at the age of 16. After Larry leaves, Crystal appears and carjacks Megan.

== Production ==
=== Writing ===
"Spree" and the following episode "Two Daughters" were originally written as one episode. Numb3rs series writer Ken Sanzel based the original script on the concept of pursuit curves. When Sanzel sent the script to the network, CBS executives requested that he divide the script into two parts. The second part became "Two Daughters".

"Spree" had two differences in storytelling. Beginning with season three, creators Cheryl Heuton and Nicolas Falacci decided to serialize the show in terms of character's lives. Since the series already delved into the personal lives and relationships of the characters, serialization was a natural progression in the development of the series. Also, "Spree" marked the first time in which the story was told from the criminal's viewpoint.

=== Casting ===
David Gallagher was cast as Buck Winters, and Kim Dickens was cast as Crystal Hoyle. Looking to show more acting depth than exhibited in his previous role in 7th Heaven, Gallagher auditioned for the role of Buck Winters. The casting director noted the difference in roles but awarded Gallagher with the role. Kim Dickens, formerly of Deadwood, auditioned and won the role of Crystal. Dickens enjoyed the role so much that she was disappointed in not being able to return. Lou Diamond Phillips reprised his role of FBI Special Agent Ian Edgerton. The episode marked Edgerton's third appearance on Numb3rs.

== Reception ==
When the episode premiered, 11.42 million people in the United States watched "Spree", beating Law & Order by about 490,000 viewers. Critically, the episode was very well received. Although she called Gallagher "out-of-character", Cynthia Boris of DVD Verdict seemed to enjoy the episode. Jeffrey Robinson, a DVD Talk reviewer, called "Spree" "[o]ne of the season's strongest episodes". Grouping "Spree" and "Two Daughters" together, Donald Liebenson, an Amazon.com editor, called "Spree" "compelling".
