= The Fifth Man (Numbers) =

- Numbers episode
- Episode no.: Season 5 Episode 20
- Directed by: Ken Sanzel
- Written by: Don McGill
- Production code: 520
- Original air date: April 24, 2009

Guest appearances
- Debbon Ayer as Sarah Fisher; Alan Blumenfeld as Store Owner; Shannon Cochran as Doctor Iverson; Delilah Cotto as Karen Cruz; Michael Gaston as Gil Fisher; Michael Khmurov as Slobodan Radovic; Michelle Nolden as AUSA Robin Brooks; Katie Ross as ICU Nurse (uncredited); Shea Whigham as Tom Kardum

Episode chronology
| ← Previous "Animal Rites" | Next → "Disturbed" |
- Numbers season 5

"The Fifth Man" is the 20th episode of the fifth season of the American television show Numbers. In the episode, Federal Bureau of Investigation (FBI) agents and mathematicians attempt to find a group of home invaders while dealing with the injury of the agents' boss. For FBI Special Agent David Sinclair (Alimi Ballard), the case is his first as team leader. The art department built a new office for Dr. Charlie Eppes (David Krumholtz), which reflected his own professional growth within academia. Brought in several times before to audition for various guest appearances, Debbon Ayer, Rob Morrow's real-life wife, guest-starred as the victim of a home invasion.

"The Fifth Man" first aired in the United States on April 24, 2009. Critics gave the episode positive reviews.

== Plot summary ==
Dr. Charlie Eppes (David Krumholtz) moves into a new office and receives some inspiration for his cognitive emergence theory. Some time later, FBI Special Agent Nikki Betancourt (Sophina Brown) visits the new office. She reminds Charlie that her boss and Charlie's brother, FBI Special Agent Don Eppes (Rob Morrow), asked Charlie to run some equations for a home invasion case. Later, Don, Nikki, and FBI Special Agents David Sinclair (Alimi Ballard), and Colby Granger (Dylan Bruno) stake out the next target predicted by Charlie's equations. The team rescue the couple inside, Sara and Gil Fisher (Debbon Ayer and Michael Gaston), as the home invasion takes place. During a shootout, the home invaders escape. While Don and Nikki check out the backyard, a fifth man (Michael Khmurov) emerges from the Fishers' guest house and stabs Don. Charlie rushes to the hospital, joined by his girlfriend and colleague Dr. Amita Ramanujan (Navi Rawat) and his and Don's father Alan Eppes (Judd Hirsch). Charlie wants to stay with Don, but Alan tells Charlie that Don would want Charlie to continue working on the case.

Stunned by their team leader's injury, the team, including FBI Special Agent Liz Warner (Aya Sumika), proceed with the investigation, with David, who had recently been promoted to primary relief supervisor, taking over for Don. Meanwhile, Assistant United States Attorney Robin Brooks (Michelle Nolden), Don's girlfriend, arrives at the hospital from a conference and stays with Alan while Don is in surgery. A partial print found at the scene leads the team to Los Angeles Unified School District's 2007 Teacher of the Year Tom Kardum (Shea Whigham), who is a suspect in the disappearance of an investment banker. Kardum denies any knowledge of Don's attacker. After the surgery, Don goes into cardiac arrest and temporarily flat lines as the doctor explains the extent of Don's injuries to Charlie, Alan, Robin, and Amita.

Meanwhile, the team learns that the home invaders, who had no previous criminal records before the home invasions, all lived in the same town in Croatia. While visiting Don in the hospital, Charlie confides to Alan that he feels as though he rushed the FBI work to return to work on his cognitive emergence theory. Alan's response is to tell Charlie to set some priorities. Back at CalSci, Charlie and Amita realize that all of the home invasion victims, including the Fishers, had remodeled their homes about the same time that the investment banker started his latest scheme. They also learn that the home invaders' true target was Don's attacker. The Fishers are brought in for questioning, and they tell the FBI that the investment banker asked them to help hide Don's attacker. The team then learns that he was Slobodan Radovic, a Serbian war criminal who had murdered the home invaders' families in Croatia. The FBI team also learns that the investment banker, through an intermediary who is found murdered during the investigation, wanted to pay Radovic in diamonds.

After seeing a still from a confiscated surveillance video, Charlie replicates a key to the investment banker's safety deposit box, which is at a jewellery store. Unaware that the investment banker and the intermediary are dead, the jewelry store owner (Alan Blumenfeld) assumes that Charlie, who is there to look at the diamonds, is the intermediary and lets Charlie have the diamonds. Charlie then confronts Radovic, stating that he wanted to see the face of the man who stabbed his brother and just as Radovic is about to attack, Liz, David, Colby and Nikki all wielding guns with their lasers trained on Radovic arrive and after a stand-off, the team arrests Radovic.

Some time later, the team, Charlie, and Amita visit Don, who is now awake. Don informs the team that he can return to part-time desk duty upon his release from the hospital and that he can return to full-time work in a few weeks. After everyone else leaves the room, both brothers agree that neither of them initially wanted Charlie to experience Don's life. As Charlie leaves Don's room, Charlie tells his brother that Don would see Charlie at the FBI office.

== Production ==
=== Writing ===
Earlier in the season, series co-creators/executive producers Cheryl Heuton and Nicolas Falacci developed a storyline in which David became a leader. In "The Fifth Man", David was forced to take over as team leader when Don was stabbed. The case was one of the few times in which David and Colby, who were friends with each other, had to adjust to being in an employer-employee relationship.

On the "Crunching Numb3rs: Season Five" bonus feature, series regulars Alimi Ballard and Sophina Brown reflected on the impact of Don's stabbing on David, Colby, and Nikki. According to Ballard, David had to balance his professionalism with his desire for vengeance. Brown felt that the stabbing forced Nikki to recognize how arrogant she had been. Ballard also mentioned that Colby's desire for vengeance.

=== Set design ===
Late in season five, set designers from the art department rebuilt Charlie's office. In the storyline for season five, Charlie had grown in his professional career as a professor. The art department wanted that reflected in his office. When series regular David Krumholtz saw the set for the first time, he was moved.

=== Casting notes ===
Rob Morrow's real-life wife Debbon Ayer was cast as a victim. Friends with the cast and crew, Ayer wanted to have a role on the show. Although he had previously done so on several occasions, casting director Mark Saks rarely offered roles to actors' family members or friends. Saks had Ayer audition for various roles on several occasions before he learned that Ayer was Morrow's wife. When Ayer auditioned to be Sara Fisher, Saks felt that she was the best candidate for the role. She had one scene with her real-life husband, one in which Don rescued Sara.

== Reception ==
Over 8.82 million people watched "The Fifth Man". Critically, the episode received a positive reception. Tim Holland of TVGuide.com included "The Fifth Man" in TVGuide.com's Hot List for April 24, 2009. Jeffrey Robinson, a reviewer for DVD Talk, called "The Fifth Man" one of "the best" of the season.
