= Harvest (Numbers) =

- Numbers episode
- Episode no.: Season 2 Episode 14
- Directed by: John Behring
- Written by: J. David Harden
- Production code: 214
- Original air date: January 27, 2006

Guest appearances
- Jordan Baker as Dr. Jenloe; Paul Bates as Morgue Attendant; Gibby Brand as Dr. Michael Sabello - Coroner; P.J. Brown as Baker Man; Traber Burns as Kenneth Eckworth; Paul Cassell as Daniel Piermint; Noureen DeWulf as Santi; David Dayan Fisher as Michael Tolchuck; Azita Ghanizada as Prita; John Gowans as Symposium Director; Adrian LaTourelle as Allen Kelly; Heather Mazur as Janet Eckworth (uncredited); Marti Jo Pennisi as Nurse; Joey Sorge as Manager; Mark Tymchyshyn as Dr. Lawrence Bainsworth; Matthew Yang King as Tech

Episode chronology
← Previous "Double Down"	Next → "The Running Man"
- Numbers season 2

"Harvest" is the 14th episode of the second season of the American television show Numbers. Inspired by a Christian Science Monitor article about organ tourists, people who travel to a different country to give their organs for money, and an algorithm developed in the United States, the episode features Federal Bureau of Investigation (FBI) agents and mathematicians attempting to locate a missing organ tourist before she is killed.

After airing in the United States on CBS on January 27, 2006, the episode received mixed reviews. Critics enjoyed it while the medical community was concerned about the impact that the episode would have on organ donations. "Harvest" has inspired two academic case studies in which viewers were more likely to donate their organs after watching the episode. The episode also has won one award and has been nominated for another award.

== Plot summary ==
On the same night that Dr. Amita Ramanujan (Navi Rawat) is presented with a prestigious mathematics award, FBI Special Agents Don Eppes (Rob Morrow) and David Sinclair (Alimi Ballard) respond to a disturbance call from a hotel and find a young Indian woman (Noureen DeWulf) cowering in a blood-stained basement. Back at the office, she refuses to talk to anyone until Amita, wondering why the woman was there, asks to see the woman. The woman then tells Amita that her name is Santi and that she and her sister, Prita (Azita Ghanizada), came to the United States from Chennai, India, as organ tourists, selling their kidneys on the black market to earn money for their families. Dr. Charlie Eppes (David Krumholtz) and Dr. Larry Fleinhardt (Peter MacNicol) determine the time of another victim's death as earlier in the day.

Following tips from the bread delivery man (P.J. Brown) and from the Los Angeles Police Department (LAPD), FBI Special Agent Megan Reeves (Diane Farr) goes to the hospital to see if Santi's sister is there. She learns that a young Indian woman had been in the morgue for a couple of days, dead from complications involving the removal of one of her kidneys. When Megan and Amita show Santi the picture of the dead woman, Santi tells them that she was a friend of theirs, Sonali, who was a fellow organ tourist. Santi also tells the women that there was another missing friend, Jaya. While following up on the lead about the ambulance, David and FBI Special Agent Colby Granger (Dylan Bruno) chase the ambulance that was spotted at the hospital by the bread delivery man. The ambulance crashes, killing the driver. Charlie and Larry use the driver's log to determine that the ambulance driver returned to the hospital during off-hours. At the hospital's morgue, the team finds Jaya dead and learns that a doctor had been behind the black-market organ transplants.

Charlie, Amita, and Larry use Santi's blood (providing a familiar match to Prita's human leukocyte antigen (HLA) type) and an organ-matching database to find the most likely person to receive Prita's organs. Upon finding a link to a recipient who had paid to procure Prita's organs on the black market, Don and the team track Prita and the doctor to another hotel, where they rescue Prita just before the doctor began surgery. The sisters are reunited. Amita decides to use her money from her prize to finance the sisters' education and to take a trip to India with her grandmother, since the case has inspired her to learn about her heritage. Don and Charlie become organ donors. During the case, Don learns that his and Charlie's father Alan Eppes (Judd Hirsch) had a friend who needed a transplant and could not find a match. Alan's story about his friend inspires Don to make the decision to become an organ donor. During a discussion about the need for organ donors at the dinner table, Charlie decides to become an organ donor also.

== Origin ==
An article in the Christian Science Monitor inspired Numb3rs series writer J. David Harden to write an episode about organ tourists. Harden contacted the Hollywood, Health & Society program to learn more about the need for organ donations and the process of organ matching. He initially encountered resistance to the idea of a storyline about organ donations due to the medical community's assumption that misinformation about organ transplants could lead to increased public resistance to organ donations.

Harden also incorporated Dorry Segev and Summer Gentry’s algorithm for matching transplant donors and recipients. In developing their algorithm, Gentry, a United States Naval Academy applied mathematician, and Segev, a Johns Hopkins University transplant surgeon, sought an improvement over the Top Trading Cycles and Chains (TTCC) algorithm, an algorithm developed by economists Alvin Roth, Tayfun Sonmez, and Utku Unver used to match kidney recipients with living organ donors who have different blood types from the recipients. TTCC was used to make the best possible matches during organ exchanges, a process where transplant recipient and organ donors would exchange healthy organs. To decrease the risk of organ rejection, the TTCC algorithm required a large number of organ donors and transplant recipients. The large number of people required by the algorithm was unrealistic. Using a modified version of Jack Edmonds’ computational complexity algorithm, Gentry and Segev discovered that their algorithm could be used to create a national organ donor registry.

== Reception ==
First airing in the United States on January 27, 2006, over 13.22 million people watched "Harvest" on CBS. The episode received mixed reviews. Television critics liked the episode. Cynthia Boris of DVD Verdict stated that the episode had "nice twists". In an article highlighting the rise of realistic Indian-American characters on American television, Anil Padmanabhan, a writer for India Today, called the episode Rawat's "best exposure". Opinions from the medical community were more mixed. Although he found the message about organ donations "positive", Kevin B. O'Reilly of the American Medical Association's MedNews called "Harvest" "a mixed bag". Other medical experts disliked the storyline of black market organ donations in the United States. On the other hand, Joyce Somsak of the Health Resources and Services Administration stated that "Harvest" was "really good".

The episode inspired a couple of academic case studies. The first was a George Washington University School of Public Health and Health Services case study about the effects of television writers consulting medical professionals on the storyline of a television episode. Participants in a survey conducted by the University of Southern California and Purdue University felt that a black market for organs existed and that a person's place on the organ priority list can be influenced by money or fame. They, as a result of "Harvest", also were more likely to become organ donors or to consider doing so. The second case study was about TV's influence on the discussion of organ donations. Participants in a Hollywood Health & Society online survey were also more likely to believe in the existence of black-market organ trafficking and were more likely to donate organs after watching "Harvest". They also were more likely to see the importance of organ donations.

"Harvest" has won one award and been nominated for a second. It won the University of Southern California Annenberg School for Communication's Norman Lear Center 2006 Sentinel for Health Award in the primetime drama category, winning over two episodes of Grey's Anatomy and one episode of Without a Trace. The Academy of Television Arts and Sciences nominated Jim Vickers' work on "Harvest" for a Creative Arts Emmy for "Outstanding Stunt Coordination", but the episode lost to an episode of E-Ring.
