= The Nine (TV series) =

American drama TV series (2006–2007)

- Genre: Drama; Action
- Created by: Hank Steinberg; K. J. Steinberg
- Composer: Steven Bramson
- Country of origin: United States
- Original language: English
- No. of seasons: 1
- No. of episodes: 13 (9 + 4 unaired by ABC)

Production
- Executive producers: Hank Steinberg; Alex Graves
- Producers: Ethan Smith; Joy Gregory; Perry Husman
- Running time: 44 minutes
- Production companies: Sunset Road Productions; Warner Bros. Television

Original release
- Network: ABC
- Release: October 4, 2006 – August 8, 2007

The Nine is an American drama television series that aired on ABC from October 4, 2006, to August 8, 2007, before being cancelled mid-season. The series was created by Hank Steinberg and produced by Warner Bros. Television.

== Plot ==
Nine people, mostly strangers to each other, are linked together when they are held hostage in a bank robbery gone wrong. In each episode, viewers learn new details of the 52-hour standoff, of which only brief snippets are seen.

The pilot episode establishes the events which the rest of the series will embellish. Two men enter the bank, armed, and quickly restrain both the security guard and an off-duty police officer. Viewers see details of what brought each person to the bank that day.

Some time after the end of the standoff, the former hostages arrange a meeting with one another in an effort to stay in touch and help each other. Various characters also form relationships apart from the group and maintain regular contact with each other during the week, while others are connected through relationships that predate the events in the bank.

== Cast and characters ==
=== Main ===
- Lourdes Benedicto as Eva Rios, a teller in the bank that is robbed and a single mother. Eva is injured during the standoff and dies shortly thereafter. Eva is Franny's sister.
- John Billingsley as Egan Foote, a data processor. Egan begins the series severely depressed and suicidal. He is in the bank the day of the robbery to kill himself in the bathroom. After the standoff, he is hailed as a hero and feels that he has a "new lease on life".
- Jessica Collins as Elizabeth "Lizzie" Miller, a social worker. Lizzie is in a serious relationship with Jeremy at the beginning of the series. She finds out she is pregnant before walking into the bank.
- Tim Daly as Nick Cavanaugh, a police officer who happens to be a customer in the bank during the robbery. Nick has a gambling problem. Just prior to the robbery, Nick and Eva arranged to go out on a date.
- Dana Davis as Felicia Jones, a high-school student and daughter of Malcolm. Felicia is in the bank when the robbery occurs. After the standoff, she develops amnesia and cannot remember anything from the event.
- Camille Guaty as Francesca "Franny" Rios, a bank teller and Eva's sister.
- Chi McBride as Malcolm Jones, the bank manager and Felicia's father.
- Kim Raver as Kathryn Hale, an Assistant District Attorney. Kathryn is in the bank with her mother at the time of the robbery; her mother is set free. Kathryn's boyfriend proposes after the robbery. She accepts but has a connection with Nick.
- Scott Wolf as Jeremy Kates, a cardiothoracic surgeon. Jeremy is in a serious relationship with Lizzie at the start of the series.
- Owain Yeoman as Lucas Dalton, one of the two bank robbers. His brother is the other robber. Lucas seems to have a strange connection to Felicia.
- Jeffrey Pierce as Randall Reese, Lucas's brother and colleague during the bank robbery.

=== Recurring ===
- Tom Verica as Ed Nielson: Kathryn's colleague and boyfriend.
- Michael Emanuel as Tom Mitchell: security guard at the bank who is killed during the robbery.
- Kim Staunton as Naomi Jones: Malcolm's wife and Felicia's mother.
- Susan Sullivan as Nancy Hale: Kathryn's mother who is released from the bank during the robbery.
- Eric Lively as Brad
- Hunter Clary as Ricky Rios: Eva's son and Franny's nephew.
- April Grace as Andrea Williams: Kathryn's campaign leader when she is running for D.A.
- Jamie McShane as Henry Vartak: Nick's colleague with whom he has a rather unpleasant working relationship.
- Lillian Hurst as Consuela Hernandez: Eva and Franny's grandmother who has raised both of them.

=== Guest stars ===
- Veronica Cartwright as Barbara Dalton: Lucas and Randall's mother.
- Bonita Friedericy as Mary Foote: Egan's wife.
- JoBeth Williams as Sheryl Kates: Jeremy's mother
- Corey Stoll as Alex Kent

== Broadcast ==
The show premiered on October 4, 2006, on ABC, in the 10 o'clock (Eastern Standard Time zone) slot after Lost. In Canada, the series debuted on CTV on October 10. In the UK, the show was picked up by Five; it was due to begin airing in 2007. However, it was not actually shown by that network until July 2008, when it began airing on Five's sister channel, Five US.

In late November 2006, ABC took The Nine off its schedule. In March 2007, ABC announced that while the rest of the 13-episode season might be aired over the following month, the show had been officially canceled due to poor ratings and there would be no second season. On May 15, 2007, the series was officially cancelled by ABC.

ABC later revived The Nine beginning Wednesday, August 1, 2007. After the first two showings set record ratings lows, the final run of The Nine was dropped by ABC – along with equally dismal The Knights of Prosperity – and replaced with reruns of both According to Jim and Primetime: The Outsiders. On August 16, 2007, the network announced that the remaining episodes would be released on ABC.com and would be available until September 24, 2007.

In March 2009, DirecTV announced a deal made with Warner Bros. to show all episodes of the series on its The 101 Network channel, beginning May 27, 2009.

== Episodes ==
No.	Title	Directed by	Written by	Original release date	U.S. viewers (millions)
1	"Pilot"	Alex Graves	Hank Steinberg & K. J. Steinberg	October 4, 2006	11.91
Nine strangers lives are changed when caught in a bank robbery gone wrong, lasting for 52-hours.
2	"Heroes Welcome"	Alex Graves	Hank Steinberg & K. J. Steinberg	October 11, 2006	8.25
The nine hostages begin the return to their lives after the bank robbery.
3	"What's Your Emergency?"	Alex Graves	K. J. Steinberg	October 18, 2006	8.21
Kathryn returns to work but is haunted by the robbery. Felicia tries to overcome her amnesia concerning the robbery.
4	"Brother's Keeper"	Andrew Bernstein	Hank Steinberg & K. J. Steinberg	October 25, 2006	7.77
Nick disagrees with Lizzie's plans for the nine to face Randall in court. Egan invites Jeremy to a friend's party. Nick tells Franny to tell Kathryn that Ricky's father is making threatening phone calls from prison.
5	"All About Eva"	Christopher Misiano	Tom Szentgyörgyi	November 1, 2006	6.52
Malcolm juggles his work and his efforts to help a friend. Nick and Kathryn discover a connection between Eva and the robbery. Lizzie is pregnant with Jeremy's child.
6	"Take Me Instead"	Alex Graves	Joy Gregory	November 8, 2006	7.22
Lizzie has made a new connection with Lucas, while Kathryn and Nick, as well as Jeremy and Franny, find their relationships growing closer.
7	"Outsiders"	Dean White	K. J. Steinberg	November 22, 2006	4.10
While looking through Eva's things, Franny finds something disconcerting. Jeremy and Lizzie reveal their own secret of what happened between them during the robbery. Nick's ex-wife is back in his life bringing her troubles with her.
8	"Turning Point"	Daniel Attias	Tom Garrigus	August 1, 2007	2.99
Kathryn receives the mayor's support for the office of District Attorney, which could lead to a turning point in her career. Eight of the nine hostages are brought to the DA's office to discuss the security guard's death. Lizzie becomes aware of the relationship between Jeremy and Franny.
9	"You're Being Watched"	Mary Harron	Story by : Tom Szentgyörgyi; Teleplay by : Hank Steinberg	August 8, 2007	1.94
A note is found suggesting that the nine are being watched. Soon after, Lizzie disappears, and Jeremy and Egan turn to Nick for help. The rest of the group learns of Franny and Jeremy's relationship.
10	"The Inside Man"	Matt Shakman	Story by : Ted Humphrey & Tom Szentgyörgyi; Teleplay by : Ted Humphrey	July 29, 2009	N/A
After Egan makes a surprising statement on national television, the lives of the nine are thrown into turmoil.
11	"Man of the Year"	Nelson McCormick	Joy Gregory & Nicole Mirante	August 5, 2009	N/A
While Malcolm struggles with whether or not he deserves an award for his many years of civic service, his hapless brother visits unexpectedly.
12	"Legacy"	Robert Duncan McNeill	Jason Wilborn	August 12, 2009	N/A
Nick asks Malcolm for guidance in coping with an old promise of revenge for his father's death.
13	"Confessions"	Marcos Siega	Hank Steinberg & K. J. Steinberg	August 19, 2009	N/A
Burdened by his sins, Malcolm makes a shocking confession.

== Awards and accolades ==
The Motion Picture Sound Editors professional society nominated the "Pilot Episode" for the 2007 Golden Reel Award for Best Sound Editing in Television: Short Form – Dialogue and Automated Dialogue Replacement. At the award ceremony, held February 24, 2007 at The Beverly Hilton Hotel, this award went to an episode of CSI: Miami.
