= Guns and Roses (Numbers) =

- Numbers episode
- Episode no.: Season 2 Episode 20
- Directed by: Stephen Gyllenhaal
- Written by: Robert Port
- Production code: 220
- Original air date: April 21, 2006

Guest appearances
- Matthew John Armstrong as Richard Davis; Lesley Fera as ATF Agent Annie Wilson; Markus Flanagan as ATF Supervisor Eric Turner; Bobby Hall as Guard; Joshua Leonard as Roy Mitchell; Sandra Lindquist as Nikki Davis; Michelle Nolden as Robin Brooks; Eric Steinberg as ATF Agent Rho

Episode chronology
← Previous "Dark Matter"	Next → "Rampage"
- Numbers season 2

"Guns and Roses" is the 20th episode of the second season of the American television series Numbers. Written by Robert Port and filmed around the Los Angeles Center Studios, the episode features a Federal Bureau of Investigation (FBI) Special Agent investigating the apparent suicide of a former girlfriend while beginning a new relationship. Port based his story on real-life instances. He also was inspired to include acoustic testing and genomic research in the script.

Within the series, it launches a storyline that focused on FBI Special Agent Don Eppes's (Rob Morrow) personal life. Appearing once before, Michelle Nolden reprises her role of Assistant US Attorney Robin Brooks. Her role was expanded to explore Don's relationships.

"Guns and Roses" first aired in the United States on April 21, 2006. Critics gave the episode a mixed reception. One critic disliked the episode's plot while another liked the subplot.

== Plot summary ==
Assistant US Attorney Robin Brooks (Michelle Nolden) approaches FBI Special Agent Don Eppes (Rob Morrow) at a gun range and thanks him for his help during a previous case. Don receives a phone call to a crime scene while on a date with Robin. When he arrives, he learns that his former girlfriend from Albuquerque, New Mexico, Bureau of Alcohol, Tobacco, Firearms, and Explosives (ATF) Agent Nikki Davis (Sandra Lindquist), was found dead, supposedly from a suicide. Don, not believing the preliminary findings, asks Dr. Charlie Eppes (David Krumholtz), his brother and an FBI math consultant, to mathematically determine whether she was inclined to suicide. Early evidence reveals that she was to retire soon and that the last person she called was Don. The team learns that her husband ATF Agent Richard Davis (Matthew John Armstrong) was supposed to be in Texas but was instead in Mexico. Don goes back to Nikki Davis's house, where Richard Davis, who had just returned from Mexico, walks in on Don. Richard Davis tells Don that she had been diagnosed with cancer and was treating it with expensive experimental drugs from Mexico, hence Richard Davis' visits there.

Charlie's use of a modified version of the Holmes-Rahe Stress Scale indicates that, due to her involvement in community activities and her excellent record with the ATF, Nikki Davis probably did not die by suicide. At the Davises' house, Charlie, his friend and colleague Dr. Larry Fleinhardt (Peter MacNicol), and FBI Special Agent David Sinclair (Alimi Ballard) then attempt to match the pattern caught by microphones found around the neighborhood with the sound from Nikki Davis' service revolver. Charlie, Larry, and David's test reveals that a second person was in the room the night she died. Coupled with evidence that Richard Davis was involved in weapons smuggling, Charlie's evidence confirms Don's suspicion that she was murdered.

Meanwhile, the FBI team learns that someone tipped off the biker gang under ATF investigation for a series of bank robberies involving high-powered guns. Don goes to Robin to ask her for the ATF's file, but she is upset with him for leaving their date. Once Don tells her the truth about his phone call, she agrees to help him. Don, David, and FBI Special Agent Megan Reeves (Diane Farr) go to the informant's house and find both the informant and Richard Davis dead. They conclude that Richard Davis was at the house to find his wife's killer and that Nikki Davis's killer is eliminating witnesses and investigators. Upon a tip from the Los Angeles Police Department, the FBI team arrests the ringleader of the gang. Don considers holding him without evidence, but Robin tells him not to compromise the investigation and he is released. With Charlie's analysis of the DNA found in the Davises' bedroom, the team learns that one of her own teammates, ATF Agent Rho (Eric Steinberg), was behind Nikki Davis' death. While Agent Rho and the biker gang commit another heist, Don and his team arrive on the scene and, after a tense gunfight, the biker gang along with Agent Rho are all shot either by Don or his team with Rho surviving, and any others surviving, finally arrested.

Afterward, Charlie expresses his concerns about Don's ability to handle the stresses of FBI work to their father, Alan Eppes (Judd Hirsch), and they conclude that Don should be able to handle the stresses of his work because of his family ties. Don, taking into consideration Alan's earlier suggestion about dating again, goes to Robin's house to see her.

== Production ==
=== Writing ===
Robert Port wrote "Guns and Roses", and he and Numb3rs technical consultant/writer Mark Llewellyn, a retired FBI agent, wrote the story. They based the episode on the common occurrence of law enforcement officers committing suicide. Port found the use of the Holmes-Rahe stress scale and incorporated it into the episode. They referenced a previous case to set up the situation where Charlie questions Don's belief that Davis could not have committed suicide. The tension between the FBI and the ATF and the ATF's practice session were based on real-life tension between the agencies and the real-life practice sessions. Port constantly included the word "Mexico" in the dialogue to connect the story's subplots.

Inspired by an article about the group, Port and Andrew Black, one of the show's researchers, consulted with DNAPrint Genomics, a company which used DNA to identify suspects by their geographical origin. Black also contributed Larry's objection to the use of DNA profiling. Port also consulted with National Geographic geneticist Spencer Wells, who provided the equations for the episode.

Show creator Nicolas Falacci's comment about the use of an acoustics test in the JFK assassination inspired Port to include one in the episode. Port consulted Paul Ginsberg, an acoustics engineer, for details about the test. Dr. Gary Lorden, one of the math consultants, provided the equations for the audience-vision comparing figure skating ratings to the case.

=== Filming ===
The crew filmed around the LA Center Studios, the studios where Numb3rs filmed. Originally, the crew wanted to shoot some scenes, such as the scene where Charlie and Amita discuss Don's social life, at the California Institute of Technology (Caltech). They were unable to do so since they had used the 18 days that the university allotted them earlier in the season. They then decided to film those scenes at the studio. The shootout toward the end of the episode, also filmed at the LA Center Studios, took two days to film. The crew also filmed the first scene featuring Don and Robin at a local gun range.

=== Casting notes ===
After reading about FBI agents' lives, actor Rob Morrow asked the producers to explore the impact of FBI work on Don's personal and social life. Writers planned for Don to have a relationship with someone who was not a regular cast member. Michelle Nolden, who had previously worked with Morrow on Showtime's Street Time, was cast as AUSA Robin Brooks. The episode marked Nolden's second appearance, with the first being in "The O.G."

Also, Port and Llewellyn had written the scene where Charlie, Larry, David performed the acoustics test with Bill Nye in mind. Nye was unable to shoot the scene due to a speaking engagement, so the scene was written for Larry.

== Reception ==
Over 12.09 million people in the United States watched "Guns and Roses". The episode received a mixed reception from critics. Cynthia Boris of DVD Verdict called the episode a "dark story". David Hochman of TVGuide.com stated that the romantic aspect of the episode was "promising" and that it was Don's "biggest personal story line yet".
