= Santa Fake =

- Directed by: J.M. Burris
- Written by: J.M. Burris
- Produced by: Chad Burris; Matthew Hanson; Jonathan Delaney Marsh; NaNi Rivera
- Starring: Damian McGinty; Heather Morris; John Rhys-Davies; Judd Nelson; Jeff Fahey; Tony Amendola
- Cinematography: Ray Ortega
- Edited by: Michael Taylor; Shawn Wayman
- Music by: Ryan Beveridge
- Release date: October 4, 2019
- Running time: 86 minutes
- Country: United States
- Language: English

Santa Fake is a 2019 American Christmas film written and directed by J.M. Burris and starring Damian McGinty, Heather Morris, John Rhys-Davies, Judd Nelson, Jeff Fahey and Tony Amendola.

== Plot ==
In a Derry orphanage in 1994, orphaned baby Patrick Keeley is visited by a little person who tells him he will go on to do great things. 25 years later, Pat illegally immigrates to start a new life in New York City. He finds off-the-books employment and a father figure in Irish restaurant owner, Joe, but after a few months is asked to deliver two suitcases for his boss in return for $10,000 on the stipulation that he does not look inside them. Pat thinks about the shady dealings Joe has involved himself in and, after running into several police officers on the way to the drop, gets spooked and takes the first bus out of town.

His bus journey ends at Santa Fe where he pays for a single night at a Bed and Breakfast run by the widowed Mrs. Ortega. Pat calls Joe to reassure him that he will deliver the briefcases. Joe is furious that Pat ran off with them and scares him into hanging up while demanding his location. However, Joe determines where Pat is thanks to the area code and dispatches two of his top lieutenants, Jim and Seb, to kill Pat and retrieve the money. A wiretap on the phone prompts two FBI Agents to follow them, as they are trying to catch Joe for money laundering.

Pat opens the briefcases to find that they contain $1.3 million. After paying for a longer stay, he heads to the mall to buy himself a new wardrobe using the initially promised $10,000 as an advance. Attempting once more to clear things up with Joe, he is informed of his impending death and tries to flee again, only to bump into the mall's events coordinator Emily. Between Emily's concern that they have no mall Santa to entertain the kids, and Pat's concern for his safety, he agrees to go along since he figures he can hide in plain sight with the costume. He quickly wins over the children who visit with his kindness and penchant for singing.

Pat dumps the briefcases and keeps his money in a backpack, traveling to and from the mall in disguise to avoid being spotted by Jim and Seb, who have also arrived. Emily continuously tries to get him to fill out tax forms so he can be employed, but because of his illegal status, he says he'll work for free. Emily offers a compromise by taking him to dinner the following night. This and an encounter with Mrs. Ortega, still mourning her deceased husband, causes a crisis of faith in Pat and he heads to a nearby church. There he is offered reassurance by Padre Estaban, and in return reassures him that the church's upcoming toy drive will go well despite the lack of donations.

Out on his date with Emily, Pat learns that she's never traveled except for an out-of-state university, and Pat tells her that his father died in The Troubles and his mother had to give him up when he was born. Pat attempts to hide from any onlookers, but is unknowingly aided by the little person from the film's beginning, who distracts Seb and Jim by challenging them to remember all the lyrics to "The Twelve Days of Christmas". The date goes well, but upon returning to the B&B he is shaken when Mrs. Ortega tells him the FBI visited and traced a call to the establishment.

The next day during Santa duty, Pat meets a boy named Vicente who lives in a group home. Sympathetic to the boy's position, he enlists Emily and the security guard Ryan to help him buy the toys the kids have been asking for all month and hand them out on Christmas Eve. Though everything goes well at first, Jim and Seb finally realize that Pat is Santa and give chase. Pat evades them and flees to the church, with Emily and the onlookers following soon after. Pat first runs to the church to leave the backpack filled with money and a note to give the kids a good Christmas, which is later found by Padre Estaban.

Everyone gathers in the town square, drawn by Pat singing "O Holy Night" before his assumed death or arrest. He tries to escape in an antique fire truck, Emily joining him as he explains his situation to her, but Seb is arrested by Ryan and Jim is taken out by Padre Estaban. Despite the seeming victory, the fire truck runs out of gas and Pat has a breakdown because of the hopelessness of his situation if he's caught by the authorities or Joe's forces. In his panic, he falls out of the truck and blacks out.

When Pat wakes up, he is face to face with a reindeer and the real Santa Claus, with flashbacks revealing that he has been present for several moments in the film without anyone noticing. Furthermore, the little person who has been appearing is his elf Alowishus, who alerted Santa of Pat's potential for kindness and generosity thanks to his upbringing helping him relate to less-fortunate children. Santa states that he is 1749 years old and wants to retire, and would like Pat to apprentice under him and one day take over the business. Emily and Pat assure each other that they'll see each other again before Pat joins Santa and the two fly to the North Pole.

In the epilogue, Mrs. Ortega adopts Vicente, Emily receives plane tickets to Ireland, and Joe is given a wrapped box of coal by an unseen force.

== Cast ==
- Damian McGinty as Pat Keeley
- Heather Morris as Emily Gresham
- John Rhys-Davies as Joe O'Brian
- Judd Nelson as Seb Shew
- Jeff Fahey as Jim Kelly
- Tony Amendola as Padre Estaban
- Soledad St. Hilaire as Mrs. Ortega
- Ryan Begay as Officer Ryan
- Luke Whoriskey as John
- Pancho Moler as Alowishus
- Gary Farmer as Santa Claus

== Production ==
The film was shot in New Mexico in December 2017. Judd Nelson, Jeff Fahey, and John Rhys-Davies were named as starring in the film and producer Delaney Marsh noted that the planned 12-day film schedule would be its "biggest challenge". Actor Damian McGinty described the movie as "a very lovely, heartwarming family-friendly Christmas film".

== Release ==
Santa Fake was given a limited theatrical release on October 4, 2019, after which it was released to video on demand.

== Reception ==
Frank Scheck of The Hollywood Reporter gave the film a negative review and wrote, "J.M. Buris' debut feature severely tests the limits of how much mediocrity viewers will accept in exchange for some forced holiday cheer."
