= Blake Bashoff =

American actor

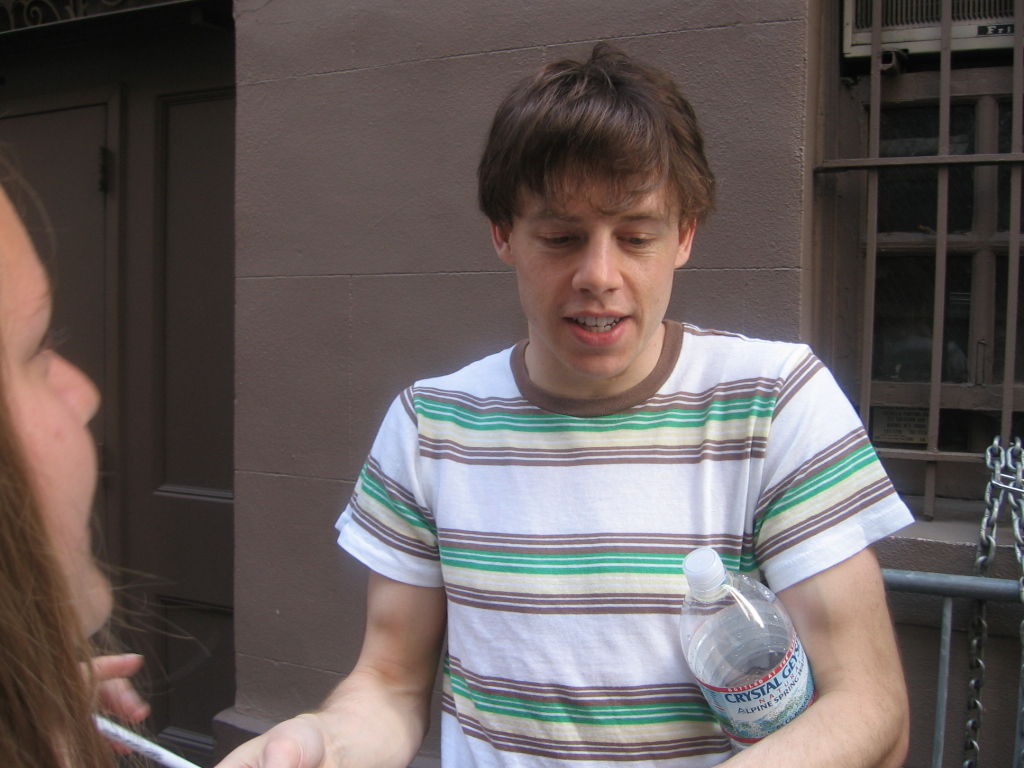
- Bashoff at the stage door of Spring Awakening following a performance as Moritz Stiefel, 2009
- Born: Blake Warren Bashoff; May 30, 1981 (age 45); Philadelphia, Pennsylvania, U.S.
- Occupations: Film, television actor
- Years active: 1990–present

Blake Warren Bashoff (born May 30, 1981) is an American television and motion picture actor, known for his role as Moritz Stiefel in Spring Awakening. He has also appeared in a number of guest roles on television series, including the ABC series Lost as Karl Martin.

== Early life ==
Bashoff was born in Philadelphia, Pennsylvania, the son of Irene (Zalcman) and Kenneth "Ken" Bashoff. His family is Jewish. Bashoff started acting at the age of 10, working primarily in commercials, and then singing and dancing in film and theater. He moved to Hollywood after graduating from George Washington High School in 1999.

== Career ==
Bashoff had a role in the CW hit show One Tree Hill in its first season. He also appeared in Bushwhacked, Big Bully (for which he won a Young Artist Award), and The New Swiss Family Robinson in 1998. After taking a break from acting, he received a recurring role on Judging Amy, playing the character of Eric Black, an abused gay teenager. In 2000, he played the role of Jesse in You're Invited to Mary-Kate and Ashley's School Dance Party. He has since appeared in Deuces Wild and Minority Report, and has a minor recurring role in One Tree Hill. He also appeared in an episode of Charmed, "The Bare Witch Project", as Duncan, a young man who accidentally conjured Lady Godiva. He played the role of Josh Cooper, a victim's son, in the seventh episode of season four of the series NCIS. In October 2006, he landed a recurring role as Karl in the television series Lost, both in the third and fourth season.

On December 18, 2007, Bashoff made his Broadway debut in the role of Moritz Stiefel in the Tony Award-winning musical Spring Awakening, replacing John Gallagher Jr. His last Broadway performance was on August 2, 2008. He was replaced on Broadway by former ensemble member and Moritz understudy Gerard Canonico. Bashoff reprised his role as Moritz on the first national tour of Spring Awakening. He ended his run with the Spring Awakening national touring cast on August 16, 2009, and was replaced by Taylor Trensch.

Bashoff also appears in the 2008 film Together Again for the First Time, which stars David Ogden Stiers and Julia Duffy. He played Mark, Peggy Olson's boyfriend, on season four of Mad Men.

== Personal life ==
Mostly retired from acting, Bashoff now lives on a farm with his husband.

== Filmography ==
=== Film ===
Year	Title	Role	Notes
1995	Bushwhacked	Gordy	
1996	Big Bully	Ben	
1998	The New Swiss Family Robinson	Todd Robinson	
2000	You're Invited to Mary-Kate & Ashley's School Dance Party	Jesse	
2002	Deuces Wild	Allie Boy	
2002	Minority Report	Public Service Announcer	
2008	Together Again for the First Time	Jason Wolders	
2013	Finding Neighbors	Jeff	

=== Television ===
Year	Title	Role	Notes
1994	Lifestories: Families in Crisis	Calvin Mire	Episode: "A Child Betrayed: The Calvin Mire Story"
1994	Law & Order	Kevin	Episode: "Second Opinion"
1994	New York Undercover	Simon	Episode: "Sins of the Father"
2000	Chicken Soup for the Soul	Michael	Episode: "$700 Salvation"
2000	Pensacola: Wings of Gold	Kevin Norris	Episode: "Answered Prayers"
2001	Dead Last	Rory Lane	Episode: "Teen Spirit"
2001–2003	Judging Amy	Eric Black	11 episodes
2002	Without a Trace	Patrick McCullough	Episode: "Suspect"
2003	Miracles	Chad Goodwell	Episode: "Hand of God"
2003	The Lyon's Den	Quentin Chadwick	Episode: "The Other Side of Caution"
2003	Boston Public	Oswald / Joseph O'Shea	Episode: "Chapter Seventy-Three"
2004	Charmed	Duncan	Episode: "The Bare Witch Project"
2004	One Tree Hill	Gary Matheson	2 episodes
2005	Numbers	Ethan Delp	Episode: "Scorched"
2006	NCIS	Josh Cooper	Episode: "Sandblast"
2006–2008	Lost	Karl Martin	10 episodes
2010	Grey's Anatomy	Elliott Meyer	Episode: "Perfect Little Accident"
2010	Mad Men	Mark Kerney	3 episodes
