= Provenance (Numbers) =

- Numbers episode
- Episode no.: Season 3 Episode 3
- Directed by: David Von Ancken
- Written by: Don McGill
- Production code: 303
- Original air date: October 6, 2006

Guest appearances
- Garret Dillahunt as Jack Tollner; David Carey Foster as Hotel Manager; Zach Grenier as Peyton Shoemaker; Benito Martinez as Arthur Ruiz; Lisa Renee Pitts as FBI Agent; Dave Powledge as Guard #2; Matt Ross as Joel Hellman; Gena Rowlands as Erika Hellman; Armin Shimerman as Patrick Holden

Episode chronology
← Previous "Two Daughters"	Next → "The Mole"
- Numbers season 3

"Provenance" is the third episode of the third season of the American television show Numbers. Inspired by real-life instances of Nazi-stolen artworks, the episode features a Federal Bureau of Investigation (FBI) investigation into a stolen painting which may have a tainted provenance. Gena Rowlands, who works as an advocate for Holocaust survivors, portrayed a Holocaust survivor who claimed that the painting was originally her family's painting. Within the series, the episode also depicts the Eppes family as Jewish.

"Provenance" first aired in the United States on October 6, 2006. Critics gave the episode positive reviews. They felt moved by the episode's plot and by Rowlands' performance.

== Plot summary ==
Someone shoots an art museum security guard and steals a Camille Pissarro painting worth $20 million. FBI Special Agents Don Eppes (Rob Morrow) and David Sinclair (Alimi Ballard) learn that the painting was to go on tour within the month. FBI Special Agent Jack Tollner (Garret Dillahunt) from the FBI's Art Theft division informs the team that the painting was possibly plundered by the Nazis during World War II, creating a tainted provenance. The investigation into the painting reveals that Erika Hellman (Gena Rowlands), a 78-year-old Holocaust survivor, made a claim in court years before that the painting belonged to her. The team learns that the court ruled that the painting belonged to current owner Peyton Shoemaker (Zach Grenier), whose father bought it in an art store in Germany after World War II. Shoemaker had loaned it to the museum to reduce insurance costs. Dr. Charlie Eppes (David Krumholtz) says that he could help find the painting. Interviews with Mrs. Hellman and her grandson, Joel Hellman (Matt Ross), reveal that both Hellmans want the painting back and that Joel had contacted an art thief but never followed through with stealing the painting. Meanwhile, back at Charlie's house, Charlie and Alan Eppes (Judd Hirsch), Charlie and Don's father, argue about the distribution of chores. Alan wants Charlie to do more around the house, and Charlie later claims that he is too busy with FBI work.

Charlie and his friends and colleagues Dr. Larry Fleinhardt (Peter MacNicol), and Dr. Amita Ramanujan (Navi Rawat) trace the countries in which the painting could be, but their analysis shows that it must still be in the United States. During this time, Larry reveals that his father was an artist who wanted Larry to follow in his footsteps and that Larry attempted to apply to art school before going into physics. Meanwhile, Megan interviews the museum's curator, Arthur Ruiz (Benito Martinez), and the art preservationist (Armin Shimerman) about the painting and asks for a museum catalog which shows the painting. Charlie uses the photo from the catalog to determine that the painting is a forgery. The team quickly eliminates three potential forgery suspects: one is in jail, and two are dead as one was murdered during the current investigation. The team learns that the real painting, forged in the 1940s by a forger who died in 1946, has been in a Hungarian vault for 60 years.

Megan and David go to the museum and arrest Ruiz for insurance fraud. He and the art preservationist discovered that the painting was a forgery and arranged for the theft out of fear of being disgraced afterward. Don returns the real painting to the Hellmans and explains that Mrs. Hellman's father, possibly foreseeing its theft by the Nazis, commissioned the forgery. At the house, Alan and Charlie show that they have a better understanding of each other's concerns about Charlie's ability to balance home life and work, which was the cause of their earlier argument. Don, whose curiosity about his family's lack of adherence to religious practices has been aroused by Mrs. Hellman's story, asks Alan if he minded Don attempting to learn whether the family of the cousin of Don's paternal grandmother, who left Germany before World War II, survived the Holocaust. Alan volunteers to assist.

== Production ==
=== Origin of the episode ===
The case is inspired by the real-life instances in which Holocaust survivors attempt to prove that various pieces of artwork have been taken by the Nazis during World War II.

=== Writing ===
Series creators Nicolas Falacci and Cheryl Heuton, when writing the show, wanted the Eppes family to be Jewish. Meanwhile, series regular Rob Morrow wanted to explore the impact of Judaism on the Eppes family and/or Don. Heuton and Falacci felt that the story for "Provenance" would be the ideal story to demonstrate that aspect of the family.

According to creator Cheryl Heuton, "Provenance" also marked the beginning of the exploration of some of Don's personal issues.

=== Casting notes ===
Gena Rowlands played the Holocaust survivor. Rowlands, an advocate for Holocaust survivors, was moved by both the plot of the episode and by the family dynamic.

== Reception ==
Over 11.07 million people watched "Provenance". Critically, the episode was very well received. Cynthia Boris of DVD Verdict said that "there's a human side to the episode that brought me to tears". An Amazon.com editor, Donald Liebenson, called "Provenance" "compelling" and stated that Rowlands' performance was "heartbreaking".
