= Lourdes Benedicto =

American actress

- Born: November 12, 1974 (age 51)
- Education: Carnegie Mellon University
- Occupation: Actress
- Years active: 1990–present

Lourdes Benedicto (born November 12, 1974) is an American actress of Filipino and Dominican descent. She is known for her roles on the television series 24 as Carrie Turner, as Eva Rios on The Nine, and for her role as Alicia Lawson on the short-lived series Cashmere Mafia.

== Early years ==
Benedicto was raised in Flushing, Queens, and she graduated from the Conservatory Drama Program at Carnegie Mellon University.

== Career ==
Benedicto has had recurring roles on NYPD Blue (1996–97, 2000), ER (2001), Dawson's Creek (2001), 24 (2003). She played Eva Rios in The Nine (2006–07) and Valerie Stevens in the remake of the science fiction television series V (2009–10). Other series performances have been in Major Crimes (2017), Animal Kingdom (2018), and The Kominsky Method (2021).

Her film debut was in Permanent Midnight (1998). She had subsequent roles in Drive Me Crazy (1999), The Fighting Temptations (2003) and Unbeatable Harold (2005).

== Filmography ==
=== Television series ===
Year	Title	Role	Notes
1996–2000	NYPD Blue	Gina Martinez	22 episodes
1999	Law & Order: Special Victims Unit	Angela Torres/Sho-Ling Fu	Episode: "Stocks & Bondage"
2000	Resurrection Blvd.	Darcy	2 episodes
2000–2001	Titans	Samantha Sanchez	13 episodes
2001	ER	Rena Trujillo	5 episodes
2001	Strong Medicine	Carmen Infante	Episode: "Relief"
2001	Dawson's Creek	Karen Torres	7 episodes
2003	24	Carrie Turner	11 episodes
2003	The Lyon's Den	Lisa Falward	Episode: "Blood"
2005	The Dead Zone	Eva Cortez	Episode: "Grains of Sand"
2006–2007	The Nine	Eva Rios	13 episodes
2008	Cashmere Mafia	Alicia Lawson	6 episodes
2008	Numb3rs	Estella Ramirez	Episode: "Thirty-Six Hours"
2009–2010	V	Valerie Stevens	10 episodes
2013	NCIS	Rebecca Childis	Episode: "Chasing Ghosts"
2017	Pure Genius	Claudia Guerrero	Episode: "Hero Worship"
2017	Major Crimes	Sarah Galvez	4 episodes
2018	Animal Kingdom		Episode: "Off the Tit"
2020	Shameless	Tasha	Episode: "Location, Location, Location"
2020–2022	9-1-1: Lone Star	Curandera	2 episodes
2021	The Kominsky Method		Episode: "Chapter 20. The Round Toes, of the High Shoes"

=== Films ===
Year	Title	Role	Notes
1990	Gryphon	Monica	TV movie
1998	Permanent Midnight	Vola	
1999	Drive Me Crazy	Chloe Frost	
2002	The Locket	Amanda Ibarra	TV movie
2003	Two Days	Rachel Adams	
2003	The Fighting Temptations	Rosa Lopez	Supporting Role
2005	Silver Bells	Lizzie	TV movie
2006	Unbeatable Harold	Cinnamon	
