= Tony Amendola =

American actor (born 1951)

- Amendola the Rose City Comic Con in 2026
- Born: August 24, 1951 (age 75); New Haven, Connecticut, U.S.
- Occupation: Actor
- Years active: 1974–present
- Spouse: Judith Marx

Tony Amendola (born August 24, 1951) is an American actor. He played the Jaffa master Bra'tac in Stargate SG-1 and Pinocchio's creator/father, Geppetto on Once Upon a Time. He also had a recurring role as revolutionary leader Edouard Kagame of Liber8 in the television show Continuum and voiced the Archmage Khadgar in several expansions of World of Warcraft, from Warlords of Draenor to The War Within.

== Early life ==
Tony Amendola was born to an Italian family in New Haven, Connecticut, on August 24, 1951. His mother originates from the town of Amalfi in Italy. In an interview by Blackfilm.com, he was asked, "Are you of Latino descent?" He answered, "I'm of Italian [descent], but a diaspora [that has led] into Argentina and Mexico. My family came to the States." He described his high school as very diverse. Amendola became an actor in college after walking in to an audition for The Tempest. Tony was the first in his family to attend college and was set to become a lawyer, but his life went into a different direction and he ended up taking both pre-law courses and theater classes. After graduating from Southern Connecticut State University in 1974, he studied and earned a Master of Fine Arts Degree in 1977 at Philadelphia's Temple University. In 1978, he moved to Los Angeles to find work in film and television.

== Career ==
In 1974, Amendola performed in summer stock at Albertus Magnus College in New Haven, Connecticut. He is known for widely diverse roles such as the murderous drug dealer Santos Jimenez on Showtime's grisly drama Dexter, the long running role of Jaffa master Bra'tac in the science fiction series Stargate SG-1, Liber8 leader Kagame on the Syfy show Continuum, Geppetto/Marco in ABC's fantasy drama series Once Upon a Time and the Catholic priest Father Perez in the 2014 horror film Annabelle, a role he reprised for the 2019 film The Curse of La Llorona.

Amendola plays a Spanish magistrate in the 1998 swashbuckler film The Mask of Zorro and appears as a separate character in its 2005 sequel. He portrays a Mexican marijuana farmer in the 2001 crime drama film Blow. His television appearances of note include roles on The X-Files, Seinfeld, Lois & Clark: The New Adventures of Superman, Angel, Alias, The Practice, Star Trek: Voyager and She-Wolf of London.

He also has a long history of stage performances and spent his first twelve years as an actor almost exclusively in the theater. His theater credits include Othello, The Taming of the Shrew, American Buffalo, Tupolski in The Pillowman, and Shylock in The Merchant of Venice. Amendola is a company member of the Antaeus Theatre Company in Los Angeles.

Amendola is the voice actor for Khadgar, one of the central characters of the video-game World of Warcraft. In 2019, he voiced Jedi researcher Eno Cordova in the video game Star Wars Jedi: Fallen Order and its 2023 sequel.

== Personal life ==
Amendola lives in Los Angeles with his wife, Judith Marx. He is fluent in Italian and Spanish.

== Filmography ==
=== Film ===
Year	Title	Role	Notes	Ref.
1985	Maxie	Street Bum		
1988	Wildfire	Lieutenant		
1991	The Borrower	Dr. Cheever		
1992	Wishman	Grodnik		
1993	The Hit List	Rabin		
1993	Three of Hearts	Harvey		
1995	Chameleon	Alberto Cortessi		
1996	Lone Star	Chucho Montoya		
1998	The Mask of Zorro	Don Luiz		
1999	Cradle Will Rock	Carl Jasper		
1999	Crazy in Alabama	Casino Boss		
2001	Blow	Sanchez		
2001	Megiddo: The Omega Code 2	Father Tirmaco		
2003	Shade	Dr. Daley		
2005	One More Round	Slick Sal		
2005	Forbidden Warrior	Ajis-Aka		
2005	The Legend of Zorro	Father Quintero		
2007	Read You Like a Book	Dante		
2007	El Muerto	Padre Somera		
2009	The Perfect Sleep	Dr. Sebastian		
2011	Green Lantern: Emerald Knights	Kentor	Voice	
2012	The Son of an Afghan Farmer	Basil		
2014	Annabelle	Father Perez		
2015	Pizza with Bullets	Sammy 'the Voice'		
2015	The Devil's Candy	Leonard		
2016	The Land Before Time: Journey of the Brave	Narrator	Voice	
2019	The Curse of La Llorona	Father Perez		
2019	Santa Fake	Father Estaban		
2021	Xico's Journey	Tochtli	Voice	
2021	Caged	Warden Perez		
2022	Father Stu	Coach Beech		
2023	Rebel Moon	King Levitica		
2023	New Life	Raymond Reed		

=== Television ===
Year	Title	Role	Notes	Ref.
1984	Partners in Crime	Emelio Ortego	Episode: "Fantasyland"	
1988	L.A. Law	Bartender	Episode: "The Princess and the Pee"	
1989	Columbo	Clergyman	Episode: "Columbo Goes to the Guillotine"	
1989	The Revenge of Al Capone	Zangara	TV movie	
1990	Dark Avenger	Tom Ringerman	TV movie	
1990	Hunter	Robert Walters	Episode: "Son and Heir"	
1991	She-Wolf of London	Dr. Pretorius	Episode: "Bride of the Wolfman"	
1991	False Arrest	Doctor	TV movie	
1993	Seinfeld	Sal Bass	Episodes: "The Pilot" and "The Implant"	
1994	The Cisco Kid	Washam	TV movie	
1995	Space: Above and Beyond	Captain Lewelyn	Episode: "Mutiny"	
1995	Follow the River	LaPlante	TV movie	
1996	Chicago Hope	Federal Agent Naramoore	Episode: "Hearts and Minds"	
1996	Kindred: The Embraced	Sorrel	Episode: "Cabin in the Woods"	
1997	Lois & Clark: The New Adventures of Superman	President Kasparov	Episode: "Sex, Lies and Videotape"	
1997	Spicy City	Skankmeyer (voice)		
1997–1999	Todd McFarlane's Spawn	Additional voices		
1997–2003	The Practice	Dr. Alvin Troub	Episode: "The Means"	
1997–2003	The Practice	Dr. Willis	Episode: "Race Ipsa Loquitor"	
1997–2003	The Practice	Dr. Bernard Gorman	2 episodes	
1997–2007	Stargate SG-1	Bra'tac	26 episodes	
1997–2007	Stargate SG-1	Brae	Episode: "The Changeling"	
1999	Babylon 5: Crusade	Natchok Var	Episode: "The Needs of Earth"	
1999	Judging Amy	Atty. Morton	Episode: "Presumed Innocent"	
2000	Star Trek: Voyager	Chorus #1	Episode: "Muse"	
2000	The X-Files	Cigarette Smoking Pontiff	Episode: "Hollywood A.D."	
2000	Angel	Thesulac Demon	Episode: "Are You Now or Have You Ever Been"	
2000	Family Law	Dr. Martinez	Episode: "Family Values"	
2001–2006	CSI: Crime Scene Investigation	Hand Writing Expert	Episode: "I-15 Murders"	
2001–2006	CSI: Crime Scene Investigation	Landlord	Episode: "Viva Las Vegas"	
2001–2006	CSI: Crime Scene Investigation	Professor Rambar	2 episodes	
2002	Charmed	Dark Priest	Episodes: "Womb Raider" and "Marry-Go-Round"	
2002	Alias	Tambor Barceló	Episodes: "Trust Me" and "The Solution"	
2002	The West Wing	Qumari U.N. Ambassador Ali Nissir	Episode: "Game On"	
2004	Dragon Storm	Theldag	TV movie	
2005	Crimson Force	Marduk	TV movie	
2005	Pizza My Heart	Father Spealo	TV movie	
2006	General Hospital	Alberto Rosales	Episodes aired August 3–4, 2006	
2007	Dexter	Santos Jimenez	3 episodes	
2008	Terminator: The Sarah Connor Chronicles	Enrique Salceda	Episode: "Gnothi Seauton"	
2008	Numb3rs	Roman Markovius	Episode: "Thirty-Six Hours"	
2009	CSI: NY	Professor Papakota	3 episodes	
2009	Dollhouse	Atalo Diakos	Episode: "Gray Hour"	
2011	NCIS: Los Angeles	Ahmed Hijazi	Episode: "Deadline"	
2011	Borderline Murder	Dr. Martinez	TV movie	
2011–2018	Once Upon a Time	Geppetto / Marco	13 episodes	
2012–2015	Continuum	Edouard Kagame	12 episodes	
2014	The Mentalist	Aurelio	Episode: "Il Tavolo Bianco"	
2015	CSI: Cyber	Ellis Christos	Episode: "Bit by Bit"	
2015	When Duty Calls	Shawn	TV movie	
2017	Castlevania	The Elder (voice)	3 episodes	
2017	Scandal	Prime Minister Nazari	Episode: "Lost Girls"	
2017	Dirk Gently's Holistic Detective Agency	Arnold Cardenas	2 episodes	
2017	Blacklist: Redemption	Volkan Sadik	Episode: "Kevin Jensen"	
2018	Rapunzel's Tangled Adventure	Keeper (voice)	Episode: "Keeper of the Spire"	
2018	Bud Light	Wizard	Advertisement	
2022	iCarly	Vinny	Episode: "iHire a New Assistant"	
2022	Black Bird	Vincent Gigante	3 episodes	
2023	Law & Order: Organized Crime	Antonio Duran	Episode: "The Infiltration Game"	
2024	9-1-1	Herman	2 episodes	
2024	The Chosen	Zechariah	1 episode	
2025	Star Wars: Tales of the Underworld	Grandfather (voice)		
2026	X-Men '97	Ozymandias (voice)		

=== Video games ===
Year	Title	Role	Notes
2014	World of Warcraft: Warlords of Draenor	Archmage Khadgar	Voice
2015	Call of Duty: Black Ops III	Dr. Yousef Salim	Voice
2015	Fallout 4	Father, Colonel Smith, Josh	Voice
2016	World of Warcraft: Legion	Archmage Khadgar, Odyn	Voice
2016	World of Final Fantasy	Brandelis	Voice
2016	Final Fantasy XV	Jared Hester	Voice
2018	Just Cause 4	Lanza Morales	Voice
2019	Star Wars Jedi: Fallen Order	Eno Cordova	Voice and performance capture, also likeness
2020	Twin Mirror	Hugh Kirkland	Voice
2022	World of Warcraft: Shadowlands	Archmage Khadgar, Odyn	Voice
2022	World of Warcraft: Dragonflight	Archmage Khadgar	Voice
2023	Star Wars Jedi: Survivor	Eno Cordova	Voice and performance capture, also likeness
2024	World of Warcraft: The War Within	Archmage Khadgar	Voice
2025	Mafia: The Old Country	Don Niccolò Galante	Voice and performance capture, also likeness
