= Two Daughters =

- Numbers episode
- Episode no.: Season 3 Episode 2
- Directed by: Alex Zakrzewski
- Written by: Ken Sanzel
- Production code: 302
- Original air date: September 29, 2006

Guest appearances
- Kim Dickens as Crystal Hoyle; David Gallagher as Buck Winters; Michael Oberlander as Adam Denton; Lou Diamond Phillips as FBI Special Agent Ian Edgerton; Mark Rosenthal as Billy Rivers; Jon Spinogatti as Motel Manager

Episode chronology
← Previous "Spree"	Next → "Provenance"
- Numbers season 3

"Two Daughters" is the second episode of the third season of the American television show Numbers. The second half of a two-episode storyline, the episode features the aftermath of a Federal Bureau of Investigation (FBI) Special Agent's abduction, which results in the search for not only the agent and her kidnapper but also for the true motive of the spree killings in the previous episode. As a character development, one FBI Special Agent's actions during the case created a story arc for that character for season three. Series writer Ken Sanzel used the trawler problem, a real-life application used to find traveling boats, as inspiration for the mathematics included in the episode.

Originally written as one episode, Sanzel had to split the episode into two parts. While filming the episode, Sanzel and director Alex Zakrzewski learned that they had to consider Farr's recently discovered pregnancy, as it would affect the episode's action scenes. Also, due to the nature of the episode, Sanzel and Zakrzewski attempted to be sensitive to the audience's reaction to the violence depicted in the episode.

"Two Daughters" first aired in the United States on September 29, 2006. Critics gave the episode positive reviews. One critic loved the character developments in the episode.

== Plot summary ==
FBI Special Agents Don Eppes (Rob Morrow), David Sinclair (Alimi Ballard), and Colby Granger (Dylan Bruno), along with Dr. Charlie Eppes (David Krumholtz), Don's younger brother and an FBI math consultant, arrive at the scene of an abandoned stolen van at an all-night café and notice that fellow FBI Special Agent Megan Reeves (Diane Farr) is late. Don receives a call from Crystal Hoyle (Kim Dickens) that she wants her husband, Buck Winters (David Gallagher), released in exchange for Megan, who has been kidnapped. The team runs back to the office. Dr. Larry Fleinhardt (Peter MacNicol), Charlie's friend and colleague and Megan's boyfriend, is visibly upset and calls David "artless" when David tries to comfort Larry.

Over Colby's objection, Don allows FBI Special Agent Ian Edgerton (Lou Diamond Phillips) to use force to coerce Buck into telling the agents Crystal's previous location. There, Colby and Ian find Megan's empty car in the garage, but not Megan. At a hotel where Crystal took Megan, Megan learns that Crystal had an affair with Brenner and was forced to give their daughter up for adoption. Megan also learns that Crystal wants to be reunited with the girl. Meanwhile, the team questions Crystal's ex-boyfriend Billy Rivers (Mark Rosenthal) and his attorney. The team learns that Brenner arranged a black market adoption for Crystal's daughter through Rivers' attorney. After Ian roughs up Rivers during the interview, Don tells Charlie that he has violated his ethics, and Charlie cautions Don about the unintended consequences of Don's actions. Charlie then suggests that Don can use the café, the garage, and the place where Crystal dumped Megan's cell phone as starting points for a search. During the team's search, Megan alerts the team to her and Crystal's location through a 9-1-1 call about gunshots in a room. The team finds Megan, whom Crystal leaves bleeding in an empty hotel room, and rushes her to the hospital, where they, Charlie, and Larry visit her. At Charlie's house, Don tells his father, Alan Eppes (Judd Hirsch), what he did and asks whether it was possible to start doing the right thing again. Alan's response is that Don's actions were a result of the concern for his team and that it is possible for Don to start doing the right thing again. Don then tells Alan that he likes being at the house, hence his frequent visits.

Colby learns that Crystal used Megan's identity to track down Rivers' attorney. While leaving the hospital, Megan and Larry determine that they need to analyze the potential adopted parents of Crystal's daughter as the parents would have been interested in establishing a normal life for her after her black market adoption. Charlie and Dr. Amita Ramanujan (Navi Rawat), Charlie's girlfriend and colleague, use a sorting algorithm that sorted social security numbers to locate her. Meanwhile, the team finds Rivers's attorney dead. Crystal arrives at her daughter's house and considers her plan. When Megan arrives at the house, Crystal calls Megan and asks to talk to Buck.

Using the GPS chip in Crystal's cell phone, the team learns that Crystal is bound for Mexico and sets up a road block. At the roadblock, Crystal calls Megan one last time to tell her to leave the area, but Megan stays with her team. Crystal drives toward the roadblock with a live grenade when she suddenly dies after being shot in the head before the grenade explodes seconds later.

Much to the team and Ian's surprise, it's revealed that Don was the one who pulled the trigger.

At Charlie's house, Alan finds the brothers arguing over a video game and tells them that he is staying at the house because he likes their company.

== Production ==
=== Writing ===
Originally, series writer Ken Sanzel wrote "Spree" and "Two Daughters" as one episode. In the original story, a female law enforcement officer was kidnapped about halfway through the episode, and, at the end of the episode, Ian fatally shot Crystal. When CBS network executives read the script, they suggested that the episode should be a two-part episode. Sanzel split the script. He decided to place Megan in danger, marking the first time that a main character on Numb3rs was in serious danger. During a production meeting, executive producer Barry Schindel made the suggestion for Don to shoot Crystal instead of Ian. Sanzel originally disliked the idea but made the change since Don's shot would characterize Don.

Sanzel included several character developments in the episode. He wrote Charlie and Amita's discussion of their relationship as a plot development. Sanzel also included the scene where Don and Alan talk about Don's tendency to go to Charlie's house. Throughout the first two seasons, writers either developed reasons for Don to be there or failed to explain Don's presence there. Sanzel wrote the scene to explain Don's constant presence at the house.

Sanzel's scenes between Megan and Crystal were similar to the ones Sanzel wrote for Lone Hero. In the movie, the protagonist and the antagonist form a connection in spite of the antagonist being the protagonist's captive. In "Two Daughters", Sanzel reversed the roles, with Megan being Crystal's hostage.

When writing the episode, Sanzel was uncertain if CBS executives would allow Buck's interrogation due to the implicit violence of Ian's interrogation tactic. He felt that the scene was a risk to the series. CBS executives approved the scene as it raised questions for Don. Buck's interrogation affected Don for the entire season. In an episode that aired later in season three, Sanzel, who wrote the episode, included the incident in one of Don's therapy sessions.

Since "Spree" was based on the concept of pursuit curves, Sanzel based included a variation called the trawler problem in "Two Daughters". The trawler problem is a real-life application of pursuit curves used to find slow-travelling boats.

=== Casting ===
The rewrite of the script allowed three people to appear in both episodes. David Gallagher reprised his role as Buck Winters, and Kim Dickens reprised her role as Crystal Hoyle. Marking his fourth appearance on the series, Lou Diamond Phillips reprised his role as FBI Special Agent Ian Edgerton.

=== Filming ===
Although director John Behring directed "Spree", director Alex Zakrzewski directed "Two Daughters". Behring finished filming "Spree" on a Friday, and Zakrzewski began filming "Two Daughters" on the following Monday. Having already developed a plan, Zakrzewski filmed scenes quickly. He also accepted suggestions from the actors. While filming Buck's interrogation scene several times, Zakrzewski initially shot Phillips walking into the interrogation room without showing Phillips' face. Upon Phillips' suggestion, Zakrzewski then filmed Phillips' face as he walked into the interrogation room.

When filming began on the episode, Diane Farr learned that she was pregnant. Farr told series executive producer Barry Schindel and several people on set, including Sanzel, about the pregnancy. She and the producers discussed her level of physical activity during the action scenes. During the scene where Crystal fired a gun at Megan, they used a stunt double to kick Crystal.

Due to the level of violence in the episode, the producers attempted to balance the audience's sensitivities with reality. Producers and Sanzel discussed the type of cut on Megan's arm. They also discussed the amount of blood that was to be shown in both the scene where the team rescues Megan and the scene where David and Colby find the dead attorney. The amount of blood was added during post-production.

== Reception ==
Over 10.69 million people in the United States watched "Two Daughters". Critically, the episode was very well received. Calling both "Spree" and "Two Daughters" "stand-alone", Cynthia Boris of DVD Verdict seemed to enjoy the episode. Stating that the episode's appeal was in the effects of the case on the team, Jeffrey Robinson of DVD Talk called "Two Daughters" "[o]ne of the season's strongest episodes". Donald Liebenson, an editor for Amazon.com, called "Two Daughters" "compelling".
