= Sophina Brown =

American television and theater actress

- Born: Saginaw, Michigan, U.S.
- Education: University of Michigan
- Occupation: Actress
- Years active: 2000–present
- Spouse: Henry Simmons (m. 2010)

Sophina Brown Simmons is an American actress, active in theater and television. She is best known for her starring roles as prosecutor Raina Troy in the CBS legal drama Shark from 2006 to 2008, and as FBI agent Nikki Betancourt in the CBS crime drama Numbers from 2008 to 2010. Throughout her career she has remained active in live theater, including as a producer of Black theater and a leader in developing and supporting theater for communities of color.

== Career ==
Brown's early theater credits included the role of Nala in the Broadway production of The Lion King, the role of Carmen in the national tour of Fame — the Musical and roles in regional productions of Jesus Christ Superstar, As You Like It, and A Midsummer Night's Dream. After moving to Los Angeles to pursue a career in television she remained active in theater. In 2016 she began producing award-winning theater productions focused on local Black artists and Black audiences, beginning with August Wilson's American Century Cycle, and took on nonprofit leadership roles to develop and support theater for communities of color.

On television, she guest-starred on Law & Order and Law & Order: Special Victims Unit, and joined the main cast of the CBS legal drama series Shark, playing prosecutor Raina Troy opposite James Woods' Deputy DA Sebastian Stark. The series ran from 2006 to 2008, and in 2007 she also appeared in the film Because I Said So. Brown then won the role of Nikki Betancourt, an FBI agent, in the CBS drama series Numbers, joining as a regular cast member in 2008 and remaining through its finale in 2010.

In the early 2010s, Brown had guest-starring roles on the television series Castle, Brothers & Sisters, The Good Wife, and NCIS. From 2013 to 2014, she co-starred in the short-lived ABC Family series Ravenswood. In 2016, Brown was cast in the pilot of the NBC drama Cruel Intentions, based on the 1999 film of same title, which did not go to air. From 2020 through 2021, she starred in the BET series Twenties by Lena Waithe. In 2022, she starred in the FX on Hulu series Kindred, adapted from the celebrated novel by Hugo Award-winner Octavia E. Butler.

== Personal life ==
Brown was born in Saginaw, Michigan. She has a BFA in Theatre Performance from the University of Michigan.

Brown married actor and Shark co-star Henry Simmons in May 2010.
