= The Farmer in the Dell =

Traditional song

Nursery rhyme
- Published: 1826
- Songwriter: Traditional

"The Farmer in the Dell" is a singing game, nursery rhyme, folksong, and children's song. It probably originated in Germany and was brought to America by immigrants. From there, it spread to many other nations and is popular in a number of languages. It is Roud Folk Song Index number 6306.

== Lyrics ==
Lyrics vary even within the same country. The following is a common version in the United States:

The farmer in the dell.
The farmer in the dell.
Hi-ho, the derry-o!
The farmer in the dell.

The farmer takes a wife.
The farmer takes a wife.
Hi-ho, the derry-o!
The farmer takes a wife.

The wife takes a child.
The wife takes a child.
Hi-ho, the derry-o!
The wife takes a child.

The child takes a nurse.
The child takes a nurse.
Hi-ho, the derry-o!
The child takes a nurse.

The nurse takes a cow.
The nurse takes a cow.
Hi-ho, the derry-o!
The nurse takes a cow.

The cow takes a dog.
The cow takes a dog.
Hi-ho, the derry-o!
The cow takes a dog.

The dog takes a cat.
The dog takes a cat.
Hi-ho, the derry-o!
The dog takes a cat.

The cat takes the mouse (or rat).
The cat takes the mouse (or rat).
Hi-ho, the derry-o!
The cat takes the mouse (or rat).

The mouse (or rat) takes the cheese.
The mouse (or rat) takes the cheese.
Hi-ho, the derry-o!
The mouse (or rat) takes the cheese.

The cheese stands alone.
The cheese stands alone.
Hi-ho, the derry-o!
The cheese stands alone.

One UK variant has "The nurse takes a dog"; it ends by clapping [patting] the dog.

== Origin and dissemination ==
The rhyme was first recorded in Germany in 1826, as "Es fuhr ein Bau'r ins Holz". It was more clearly a courtship game, with a farmer choosing a wife, then selecting a child, maid, and serving man who leaves the maid after kissing her. This was probably taken to America by German immigrants, where it next surfaced in New York City in 1883, in its modern form and using a melody similar to "A-Hunting We Will Go". From there, it seems to have been adopted throughout the United States, Canada (noted from 1893), the Netherlands (1894), and Great Britain; it is first found in Scotland in 1898 and England from 1909. In the early twentieth century, it was evident in France ("Le fermier dans son pré"), Sweden ("En bonde i vår by"), Australia, and South Africa.

=== Variations ===
Like most children's songs, there are geographic variations. In the United Kingdom, the first line is frequently changed to "The Farmer's in his den". The rhyme progresses through the farmer being in the dell or his den, his desire for a wife, hers for a child, its for a nurse, a dog, then a bone, and ending in: "we all pat the bone". Every player then pats the one picked as the bone. The "Hi-Ho, the derry-o" lyric is variously replaced with, "Ee-i, tiddly-i", in London, "Ee-i, adio", "Ee-i, andio", "Ee-i, en-gee-oh" or "Ee-i, entio", in Northern England, and "Ee-i, ee-i", in the West Country.

The Romanian language version is "Țăranul e pe câmp" ("The farmer is on the field"), but the "Hey-o" is replaced with "Ura, drăguţa mea" ("Hooray, my sweetheart"), and the last verses are: "the child has a nurse, the nurse has a cat, the cat catches a mouse, the mouse eats a cheese, the cheese is in a cask, the cask is in the garbage, the farmer to choose."

In Ireland, the tune is used in primary schools to teach the Irish language, typically with only two verses. The first verse is “Tá mo lámha fuar” (“My hands are cold”) and the second is “Tá mo lámha te” (“My hands are warm”). The bridge is “Hé hó mo Dhaidí ó” (“Hey ho, my daddy-o”).

== Game ==
The players form a circle, holding hands while singing the first verse and moving around the player in the middle, who is designated as the farmer. When the verse is over they stop, and the farmer makes his choice of a wife (sometimes without looking). The wife joins him in the center for her verse, and this pattern is repeated through the verses until either the cheese or dog is selected, or only one person is left to become the last character, who usually becomes the farmer for the next round.

== In popular culture ==
- In the 1931 film Street Scene, the opening and closing sequences show children playing and singing "The Farmer in the Dell". The closing lyrics are changed to "The farmer kills the wife." and "The wife kills the child.".
- I Am the Cheese, Robert Cormier's 1977 novel, derives its title from the song's lyrics. The 1983 film adaptation of the same name opens with a group of children playing the game.
- In the 1998 Magic: The Gathering parody expansion Unglued, the card "The Cheese Stands Alone" references the last line of the song.
- In The Wire, legendary Baltimore stickup man Omar Little often whistles the song before or after killing a drug dealer. After the death of Michael K. Williams, who played Omar, the NFL's Baltimore Ravens used the whistle as an entrance song, and Baltimore Orioles player Félix Bautista chose it as his walk-up song in Williams' honor.
- In Donna Tartt’s 1992 novel The Secret History the narrator recalls: “…Bunny had a maddening habit of breaking out into choruses of ‘The Farmer in the Dell’; […] not knowing then, as I do now, that it must have chilled them to the bone.” (p. 101)

== See also ==
- "A-Hunting We Will Go", "Ee Aye Addio" - two songs which use the same tune.
- Hi Ho! Cherry-O, a board game titled after a parody of a repeated line from the song
