= Nicole Burdette =

American playwright and actress

- Born: Nicole Maria Burdette; December 24, 1963 (age 62); San Francisco, California, U.S.
- Education: New York University (BA) The New School (MFA)
- Relatives: Mike Stepovich (uncle)

Nicole Maria Burdette (born December 24, 1963) is an American playwright and actress. She is also an assistant professor at The New School for Drama.

== Early life and education ==
Burdette was born in San Francisco, the first of two children of Ellen (née Stepovich) and Lawrence Burdette. Her uncle is former governor of Alaska, Mike Stepovich; his daughter, Nada, is married to NBA Hall of Fame player John Stockton.

She attended New York University with a triple major in acting, writing, and the humanities. She graduated with honors and was a recipient of the Founders' Day Award. She has an MFA in Creative Writing from The New School's Schools of Public Engagement.

In 2024 she was nominated for the Distinguished University Teaching Award (DUTA) from The New School.

== Career ==
In 1986, she co-founded the theater company Naked Angels, which she named and whose president of the board for many years was John F. Kennedy Jr. The Naked Angels Theater Company produced many of her plays including The Bluebird Special Came Through Here, directed by Rebecca Miller, I'd Rather Be Punch Drunk (which she starred in as well), and BUSTED (with Ashley Judd in her first stage role), which was on a double bill with the original one act of what was to become Lobby Hero by Kenneth Lonergan produced in conjunction with The John Drew Theater in East Hampton, and Chelsea Walls, directed by Tony Award-winning Edwin Sherin. She adapted her play Chelsea Walls into a feature film directed by Ethan Hawke, which premiered at the Cannes Film Festival.

Chelsea Walls was originally workshopped and performed for a one-night staged reading with Matt Dillon, Rob Morrow, Nancy Travis, and many others at The Minetta Lane Theatre, directed by Roxanne Rogers (sister of Sam Shepard). In 1998 a star-studded benefit reading of the play for the theater company was produced at the New Victory Theater on Broadway, directed by film director Alexandre Rockwell, and featured a cast that included Rufus Sewell, Ethan Hawke, John Heard, Josh Hamilton, Jesse L. Martin, Kevin Corrigan, and others. She acted in many productions with Naked Angels as well, including starring in Kenneth Lonergan's A Suffering Colonel. Burdette also was involved as both an actor and playwright with Malaparte, who produced her play The Great Unwashed, starring Ethan Hawke, Frank Whaley, Robert Sean Leonard, and Martha Plimpton.

Her first film role was in 1987's Angel Heart. Her first major role was opposite Brad Pitt in Robert Redford's A River Runs Through It. She had acted with Pitt previously in the film Johnny Suede; the scene was subsequently cut from the film. She portrayed Barbara Soprano on the HBO television series The Sopranos from 2000 to 2001. She received the Best Screenplay Award at the 2001 Newport Beach Film Festival for Maze.

She has written for magazines such as Bomb (where she was a contributing editor for many years), Interview, and Harper's Bazaar, for which she interviewed and was photographed with Redford in 1992. A piece of hers was commissioned and appeared in ANTHOLOGY: A MEMORY, A MONOLOGUE, A RANT AND A PRAYER, a collection which included pieces from Lynn Nottage, Michael Cunningham, Susan Minot, and many others.

She teaches playwriting and screenwriting at The New School for Drama. She has also taught several classes at both Columbia University's English Department and Columbia University's Film School, including the course she created, "Lou and You", about Lou Reed's intellectual and academic journey toward becoming a songwriter and musician. She also received the Agnes Ranjo Capps Fellowship for playwriting in conjunction with The University of Montana's Montana Repertory Theatre in 2008.

Burdette was nominated for the 2018 Rome Prize.

== Writing credits ==
=== Stage ===
Title	Notes
Utterly Changed	
After The Deer Hunter	The Duke Theater on 42nd Street. Starring Logan Marshall Green. Published by Playscripts.
Busted	The John Drew Theater at Guild Hall in East Hampton. Starring Ashly Judd. Directed by Timothy Hutton (1993)
Chelsea Walls	Directed by Edwin Sherin. Produced by Naked Angels. Premiered 1990. Adapted by Burdette into feature film
I'd Rather Be Punch Drunk	Produced by Naked Angels. Starring Nicole Burdette.
Listen to the Music and Wait	
Pagans in Limbo	WNYC radio play commissioned by the McCarter Theatre, February 1992. Starring Laura Linney.
Scandinavian Scorpions	directed by Burdette
Sullivan Travels Again	
The Bluebird Special Came Through Here	Directed by Rebecca Miller
The Dizziness of Too Many Possibilities	
The Great Unwashed	Directed by Max Mayer. Produced by Malaparte and Jason Blum. Starring Ethan Hawke, Robert Seam Leonard, Frank Whaley
The Investigation of Solitude	
Unknown Citizen	
Yes! We Have No Pajamas	directed by Brian MacDevitt

=== Film ===
Year	Title	Notes
2000	Maze	Screenplay co-writer
2001	Chelsea Walls	

== Acting credits ==
=== Film ===
Year	Title	Role	Notes
1990	Goodfellas	Carbone's Girlfriend	
1992	A River Runs Through It	Mabel, Paul Maclean's (Brad Pitt) girlfriend	
1995	Palookaville	Chris	

=== Television ===
Year	Title	Role	Notes
2000–2001	The Sopranos	Barbara Soprano Giglione	(1) Season 2 Episode 1: "Guy Walks Into a Psychiatrist's Office" (2000) (2) Season 2 Episode 2: Do Not Resuscitate" (2000) (3) Season 2 Episode 6: "The Happy Wanderer" (2000) (4) Season 2 Episode 13: "Funhouse" (2000) (5) Season 3 Episode 2: "Proshai, Livushka" (2001)
