= The Bumblebee Flies Anyway =

- Directed by: Martin Duffy
- Written by: Jennifer Sarja
- Based on: The Bumbleebee Flies Anyway by Robert Cormier
- Produced by: Steven Haft; Larry Meistrich
- Starring: Elijah Wood; Rachael Leigh Cook
- Music by: Christopher Tyng
- Distributed by: TSG Pictures
- Release dates: September 1999 (Deauville); January 1, 2000 (United States)
- Running time: 95 minutes
- Country: United States
- Language: English

The Bumblebee Flies Anyway is a 1999 drama film starring Elijah Wood and directed by Martin Duffy. It is based on the novel of the same name by Robert Cormier.

The film premiered at the Deauville American Film Festival in September 1999 and was given a limited release in the United States on January 1, 2000.

== Plot ==
Barney Snow wakes up in a hospital with no memory of why he is there. All he has is his name and some vague recollections of a car crash. He assumes that he is in the hospital for his amnesia and settles in to try to recover. He quickly realizes that all of the other residents of the youth clinic are suffering from terminal illnesses.

Another patient, Mazzo, asks Barney to play host for his visiting twin sister Cassie. Barney immediately falls for Cassie and strives to get better, if only to be able to see her in a setting outside the hospital. He is determined to learn about his past so that he can make her a part of his future.

In his explorations, both inside his shattered memories and through the physical rooms of the hospital, Barney starts to realize that there was no car crash. Doctor Harriman induced amnesia in Barney to make him forget everything in his past. Barney demands to know why, and Harriman tells him he has cancer. The experimental procedure that Barney is undergoing is attempting to test the power of the mind in fighting cancer. Barney had volunteered for the treatment, hoping for a miracle cure.

The theory was that if Barney did not know he had cancer, the body might stop creating the cancer cells. The explanation Harriman gives comes from an old myth that, based on weight ratios to wing power and wind resistance, the bumblebees should be aerodynamically incapable of flight — yet the bumblebee doesn’t know that, so it flies anyway.

Torn between his hope for a cure and his desire to continue his budding relationship with Cassie, Barney is forced to choose whether to go through the amnesia procedure again or remain with the memories and knowledge he has thus far acquired.

== Cast ==
- Elijah Wood as Barney Snow
- Janeane Garofalo as Dr. Harriman/Handyman
- Rachael Leigh Cook as Cassie
- George O. Gore II as Billy
- Joseph Perrino as Mazzo/Berto
- Roger Rees as Dr. Croft
- Oni Faida Lampley as Nurse Bascam
- Jeffrey Force as Allie Roon
- Christopher Mark Petrizzo as Chris Ronson
- Samuel Haft as Samuel Ronson
- John E. Mack as Willy/Orderly

== Critical reception ==
Lisa Nesselson of Variety praised the acting and called it "A meticulously made film that raises haunting questions about personal identity and the role of mind over matter in treating serious illness." TV Guide gave a more mixed review, commenting the film cannot decide if it is "a lighthearted teen coming-of-age story, or an eerie science-fiction nightmare about wayward medical ethics".
