= A-Hunting We Will Go =

English song and nursery rhyme

Song
- Published: 1777
- Composer: Thomas Arne

A variant of the melody

"A-Hunting We Will Go" is a popular folk song and nursery rhyme composed in 1777 by English composer Thomas Arne. Arne had composed the song for a 1777 production of The Beggar's Opera in London.

== See also ==
- A-Haunting We Will Go (disambiguation), a title play on this song
- "Bye, baby Bunting, Daddy's Gone A-Hunting", a similarly constructed song
- "Ee Aye Addio" - an English football chant to the same tune
- "The Farmer in the Dell" - a song with similar lyrics, content, and music
- "You're in the Army Now" - another song with similar lyrics
