= Maze (2000 film) =

- Directed by: Rob Morrow
- Screenplay by: Nicole Burdette; Rob Morrow
- Story by: Bradley White
- Produced by: Lemore Syvan; Debbon Ayer
- Starring: Rob Morrow; Laura Linney; Craig Sheffer
- Cinematography: Wolfgang Held
- Edited by: Gary Levy
- Music by: Bobby Previte
- Production companies: Starz Encore Entertainment; KBK Entertainment; Andora Pictures
- Distributed by: Regent Entertainment; DEJ Productions
- Release dates: October 10, 2000 (AFI Film Festival); November 9, 2001 (Limited release)
- Running time: 98 minutes
- Country: United States
- Language: English
- Box office: $16,974 (USA)

Maze is a 2000 romance film about a New York painter and sculptor—Lyle Maze (Rob Morrow)—with Tourette syndrome (TS) and obsessive–compulsive disorder (OCD), who falls in love with Callie (Laura Linney), the pregnant girlfriend of Maze's best friend Mike (Craig Sheffer) while Mike is away for a long stay in Africa working as a doctor.

== Cast ==
- Rob Morrow as Lyle Maze
- Laura Linney as Callie
- Craig Sheffer as Mike
- Rose Gregorio as Helen
- Robert Hogan as Lyle's Father
- Gia Carides as Julianne
- Betsy Aidem as Lydia
- Keenan Shimizu as Korean Market Employee
- Matthew Leone as Young Lyle
- Sheila Zane as Lenna
- Lanny Flaherty as Drunk
- Susan Shacter as Photographer
- Wally Dunn as Bartender
- Billy Strong as Italian Restaurant Patron
- Ken Leung as Dr. Mikao
- Brian Greene as Plate Techtonics Man
- Frank Pugliese as Scott

== Development ==
After viewing a documentary on Tourette's, Morrow believed that individuals with TS "had a lament that they would never experience love because of this affliction".

Of the film's theme, Morrow said:

I wasn't looking to do anything about Tourette—I was really thinking about themes of love. It was becoming clear that love is one of the most important things we can experience. I was trying to come up with a character who adapted himself to a life without love. ... My movie is a tribute to anyone with an affliction who thinks they'll never find love.

== Casting ==
Morrow had played a person with TS in the film Other Voices and had already learned to portray tics, so "casting himself actually made things a bit easier". Linney was Morrow's first choice for the role of Callie because "he felt the kind of understanding and close rapport he knew would be necessary to bring the two lead characters to life".

== Filming ==
Laura Linney had to deal with a different kind of physicality in the film, appearing completely nude in a lengthy scene in which her character Callie poses for Lyle in his art studio-not exactly a love scene, but with subtle sensual overtones. "It's always difficult, at least for me," she said. "It's just not a natural thing to do! I'm very glad that it was Rob behind the camera," she said, acknowledging that actors-turned-directors are "always helpful-if they're good. They're going to understand acting in a much freer way."

== Critical reception ==
Rotten Tomatoes gave the film an average rating of 4.9/10 based on 22 reviews. The New York Times wrote:

But the most grating conceit attempted by Mr. Morrow—who also directed and was a writer of the film—is to plunge inside Lyle's head by playing out several point-of-view scenes with a jittery camera. It's so unimaginative a ploy that you think Mr. Morrow knows he can't get away with it more than once, but that doesn't keep him from trying. ... Despite the practiced hand that Mr. Morrow shows with his actors, Maze becomes a vanity project bathed in poignancy. ... The most facile development of Maze is that it treats Tourette's syndrome as a kind of Muse, a force that Lyle uses to spur him on.
