= I Am the Cheese =

Novel by Robert Cormier

- First edition
- Author: Robert Cormier
- Language: English
- Genre: Young adult novel, crime fiction
- Publisher: Pantheon Books
- Publication date: 1977
- Publication place: United States
- Media type: Print (hardcover & paperback)
- Pages: 233 pp (first edition)
- ISBN: 978-0-394-83462-7
- OCLC: 2645991
- LC Class: PZ7.C81634 Iac

I Am the Cheese is a young adult novel by the American writer Robert Cormier, published in 1977.

== Plot ==
The novel opens with protagonist Adam Farmer biking from his home in the fictional town of Monument, Massachusetts, (based on Cormier's hometown of Leominster, Massachusetts) to visit his father in the fictional town of Rutterburg, Vermont. The story alternates with transcripts of tapes between a "subject" and a doctor, Brint. The subject receives psychotherapy and is interrogated by Brint.

As the book continues, it is revealed that Adam is the subject, formerly Paul Delmonte of a small New York town. His father, "David Farmer", was a newspaper reporter who was enrolled in the Witness Protection Program (WPP). The family moved to Monument and escaped several close calls with their identities, but Adam's mother is killed in the penultimate chapter in a car collision, with his father fleeing the scene. Adam/Paul survives and is taken to a government mental asylum. The last chapter implies that WPP agents killed Adam/Paul's father and reveals that Paul is regularly interrogated on the topic. Each time, Paul is unable to handle the realization of his past and embarks on a delusional bike ride across the ground of the facility. At the end of the last tape, Brint recommends that Adam be "terminated" or questioned further.

== Characters ==
- Adam Farmer (Paul Delmonte) – teenage protagonist
- David Farmer (Anthony Delmonte) - Adam's father, a former newspaper man. He pretends to work for an insurance company.
- Louise Farmer/Delmonte - Adam's mother
- Amy Hertz - Adam's friend and love interest
- Brint - Adam's questioner and "guide" as his doctor
- Mr. Grey - agent in the Witness Protection Program
- Arthur - a fat man in the town of Hookset who tells Adam of Junior Varney
- Dr. Dupont - a friendly doctor in a mental hospital; Adam is his patient
- Junior Varney - a troublemaker and thief in Hookset
- Whipper and friends - bullies in Carver
- Old man by the gas station - warns him about trusting strangers
- The elderly couple - the man helps him out of the ditch, while the woman criticizes him
- Aunt Martha - the only relative they're allowed to talk to

== Title ==
This quote is the last verse from "The Farmer In The Dell", a song that Adam sings during the book:

The cheese stands alone
The cheese stands alone
Heigh-ho, the merry-o
The cheese stands alone

He sings many of these songs throughout the novel. The song contains several characters, each taking someone with them when the farmer leaves, yet the cheese has nobody.

Adam believes that he is the cheese. He is the bait in a trap. Adam is alone in the world, his mother dead and his father missing, and he lives in a hospital.

Another point is that his father had taught him the song, possibly as a way to reinforce the new name, "Farmer," they had adopted.

== Literary significance and criticism ==
Started in 1975, I Am the Cheese began Cormier's experimentation with first-person, present-tense narration. When Cormier sent the manuscript to the publisher of his previous novel, The Chocolate War, he was confused and depressed, convinced that he was alienating his new young adult audience because of the complex and ambiguous story. However, I Am the Cheese proved to be a success.

== Awards and nominations ==
I Am the Cheese was named to five annual book lists according to the publisher description of the 20th anniversary edition. It won the 1997 Phoenix Award from the Children's Literature Association as the best English-language children's book that did not win a major award when it was originally published twenty years earlier. It is named for the mythical bird phoenix, which is reborn from its ashes, to suggest the book's rise from obscurity.

== Film adaptation ==
I Am the Cheese was released as a movie in 1983, directed by Robert Jiras and starring Robert MacNaughton, Hope Lange, Don Murray, Lee Richardson, Cynthia Nixon and Robert Wagner. The screenplay was written by David Lange (Hope Lange's brother) and Robert Jiras.

== Publication history ==
- 1977, USA, Pantheon Books, ISBN 0-394-83462-3, Pub date ? ? 1977, hardback (First edition)
- 1977, USA, Laurel-Leaf Library, ISBN 0-440-94060-5, Pub date ? ? 1977, ? binding
- 1977, UK, Victor Gollancz, Ltd, ISBN 9780575023727
- 1977, UK, Fontana Lions
- 1997, Knopf, 20th anniversary edition, ISBN 9780394834627, "with a new introduction by the author
- 2007, Knopf, 30th anniversary edition (1st Knopf trade paper) "includes Reader's Guide and interview with the author"

WorldCat libraries report holding Danish (1986), Catalan (1987), Spanish (1998), Chinese, Polish, Serbian and Korean-language editions. It is also available in Hungarian (1990).
