= Vietnam War Story II =

1988 Video release of episodes 4-6

- Directed by: Michael Toshiyuki Uno (seg #1); David Burton Morris (seg #2); Jack Sholder (seg #3)
- Written by: Adam Rodman (seg #1); Cindy Lou Johnson & Patrick S. Duncan (seg #2); Patrick S. Duncan (seg #3)
- Cinematography: Jack Wallner
- Distributed by: Home Box Office (HBO)(1988, USA, TV); HBO Video (1988, US, VHS)
- Release date: 1988
- Country: United States
- Language: English

Vietnam War Story II is a 1989 direct-to-video release of a collection of three episodes from the HBO anthology series Vietnam War Story (1987–1988).

The video consisted of three 30-minute segments, each filmed by a different director. Each segment had been previously aired on HBO cable television. Vietnam War Story had nine episodes in total. The segments released on this particular VHS correspond to anthology episodes 4-6, as follows:

1. "An Old Ghost Walks the Earth" (episode #4)
2. "R & R" (episode #5)
3. "The Fragging" (episode #6)

== Segments ==
=== An Old Ghost Walks the Earth ===
- Directed by Michael Toshiyuki Uno
- Written by Adam Rodman

==== Cast ====
- Tim Guinee as Matthews
- Wesley Snipes as Bookman
- William Frankfather as Captain Counter
- Joseph Hieu as Sergeant Lee Vinh
- Andrew-Huy Nguyen as Trang

=== R & R ===
- Directed by David Burton Morris
- Written by Cindy Lou Johnson and Patrick S. Duncan

==== Cast ====
- Cynthia Bain as Didi Sommers
- Tate Donovan as Russell Sommers
- Keith MacKechnie as Falzone
- Jeris Poindexter as Schiff
- Chris Pedersen as Kramer

=== The Fragging ===
- Jack Sholder
- Written by Patrick S. Duncan

==== Cast ====
- Ronald William Lawrence as Payton
- Andrew Roperto as Lucerne
- Courtney Gains as Albertson
- Hutton Cobb as Stoddard
- Willie J. Walton as "Bingo"
- Robert MacNaughton as Wagoner
- Byron Thames as Mitty
- Richard Lineback as Orangelo
- David Neidorf as Phelan
- Richard Coca as Perez
- David Marciano as Calvin
- Patrick Johnston as Eagleton
- Kevin Hunter as Ringle
- John Mueller as Lieutenant Foster
