= Max Rhyser =

American actor

- Born: July 11, 1982 (age 44); Amsterdam, Netherlands
- Occupations: Model, actor
- Years active: 2005–present

Max Rhyser (born July 11, 1982) is an American actor and model.

== Early life ==
Rhyser was born in Amsterdam, Netherlands to a Danish father and American-Israeli mother. Throughout his boyhood he moved often with his family around Europe because of his father prone to following the new career paths every few years. When he was 10 his family moved to Paris and when he was 15 they moved to Denmark. Every time his family moved Rhyser would join the local school theatre company. He is fluent in English and Dutch and has conversational proficiency in French and Danish.

== Career ==
Rhyser's older brother, also an actor but primarily in the European market, paved the way for him. His professional career began at the age of 18 as a stage actor in Amsterdam. Rhyser started his television and film career in 2005 when he signed with Q Management as a model. He was also secretly a German. His first acting role was as a guest star in BBC sitcom My Hero. In 2007 he appeared in a film A Four Letter Word. Rhyser breakthrough film was Homeland, where he played Kobi Zucker an Israeli looking to start fresh in New York City who falls in love with a young Palestinian woman. He also appeared in 2010 Violet Tendencies. His next movie was The Genesis of Lincoln. Rhyser also works as a stage actor.

2009-2011 found Mr. Rhyser's career populated with several short films: Heads And Tails, Dawn, The Teacher, A Fallen Glass, Scotch, The Walk Home, Requited, The Lair, and Decent Men. 2010's Violent Tendencies was a feature-length opportunity for a resurrection of his character 'Long John' from A Four Letter Word. In Between Men (2010–2011) is a web series in which Rhyser played a lead character in a group of gay friends in New York. The series' ten-minute format and millennial mentality has been nonetheless compared to gay LGBTQ high-water mark Queer as Folk, and has so far received lackluster notoriety and critical reception. The series is available for free on YouTube and has garnered a substantial cult following. May 2012 saw the release of The Genesis of Lincoln, and yet another feature-length film, Chaser, which was filmed and entering production. In 2014, he starred along Robert MacNaughton and Ashton Leigh in the Damien Leone Indie Horrorfilm Frankenstein vs. The Mummy.

== Personal life ==
Rhyser considers himself Jewish and is gay. He lived in London where he moved when he was 20. Currently he resides in New York City.

== Filmography ==
=== Film ===
Year	Title	Role	Notes
2007	A Four Letter Word	Long John	
2007	Razortooth	Eddie	Video
2008	Homeland	Kobi Zucker	
2009	Heads and Tails	Paulo	
2009	Dawn	Matt	Short
2010	The Teacher	Bartender	Short
2010	Violet Tendencies	Long John	
2010	A Fallen Glass	Mugger	Short
2010	Scotch	Danny Jr.	Short
2011	Requited	Gregor	Short
2011	The Lair	Raphael	Short
2011	Decent Men	Soldier	Short
2011	The Walk Home	Guy/Death	Short
2011	Le Petit Sac Plastique	Max	Short
2012	Bare	-	Short
2013	Chaser	Zach	Short
2013	Truth	Man in Cafe	
2013	The Passive-Aggressive Little Toaster	Owen	Short
2013	Affliction	Michael	Short
2013	Parameter	Charles	Short
2014	Straight as an Arrow	Pim	Short
2014	Nero Fiddles	Max	
2015	Frankenstein vs. The Mummy	Victor Frankenstein	
2015	Occupy Me	David	Short
2016	E-Demon	Taylor Shapiro	
2016	Megrim	The Subject	Short
2017	Gold Star	Trevor	
2018	Role Play	Jeff	Short
2019	Knock Me Down	Max	Short

=== Television ===
Year	Title	Role	Notes
2005	My Hero	-	Episode: "The Foresight Saga"
2010-11	In Between Men	Jacob Ross	Main Cast: Season 1
2013	The Outs	Guy #2	Episode: "Over It: The Outs Chanukah Special"
2013	Conversations w/ My Ex	Jesse	Episode: "Breaking Away"
2013-14	LI Divas	Z	Recurring Cast: Season 1

=== Music video ===
Year	Artist	Song title	Role
2014	Kiesza	"Hideaway"	Guy
