= Vietnam War Story =

1987 HBO cable television anthology series

- Genre: War, Drama
- Country of origin: United States
- Original language: English
- No. of seasons: 1
- No. of episodes: 9

Production
- Executive producers: Fred Fuchs; Georg Stanford Brown
- Producers: Patrick Sheane Duncan; Neil Stearns
- Cinematography: Jack Wallner; Stephen Lighthill; Robert D. Yeoman
- Running time: 270
- Production company: HBO Showcase

Original release
- Network: HBO
- Release: August 29, 1987 – August 21, 1988

Related
- Vietnam War Story II

Vietnam War Story is an HBO cable television anthology series that ran from 1987 to 1988 and included a total of nine, 30-minute episodes.

The series depicts stories inspired by real-life events of soldiers in and around combat. Details were fictional, but most episodes were written by Vietnam veterans.

== Releases ==
Subsequent to its initial airing, direct-to-video VHS releases were issued with three episodes each, but not the complete series.

- Vietnam War Story I – Included episodes 1–3.
- Vietnam War Story II – Included episodes 4–6.
- Vietnam War Story III – Included episodes 7–9.
- Vietnam War Story: Last Days – A newer trilogy, it aired on HBO in August 1989, after the original nine episodes. Its three new stories occur in 1975 when only small units and advisers remain with Saigon troops to resist the Viet Cong, and even these are about to leave. The segments are titled: "Dirty Work", "The Last Soldier", and "The Last Outpost".

== Notable guest stars ==
The episodes feature a number of notable guest stars.

- Tony Becker as McCready
- Merritt Butrick as Siska
- Joshua Cadman as Olson
- Nicholas Cascone as Zadig
- Francois Chau as "Jojo"
- Byron Cherry as Janner
- George Cheung as Sapper
- Peter Cohl as Henderson
- Raymond Cruz as Diaz
- Lee de Broux as Mr. Destel
- John DeMita as Lieutenant Engleman
- Tate Donovan as Russell Sommers
- Stacy Edwards as Mary Lyle
- William Frankfather as Captain Counter
- Tom Fridley as Mazelli
- Courtney Gains as Albertson
- Todd Graff as Malone
- Tim Guinee as Matthews
- Laura Harrington as Meg Taylor
- David Harris as Harris
- Tom Hodges as Dale Destel
- Leah Remini as Judy Missoni
- Elizabeth Kemp as Lynn
- Eriq La Salle as K.C.
- Richard Lineback as Orangelo
- Keith MacKechnie as Falzone
- Robert MacNaughton as Wagoner
- David Marciano as Calvin
- Carolyn Mignini as Captain Wallner
- Glenn Morshower as Dr. Thurman
- Kieran Mulroney as Teebs
- Bill Nunn as MP #1
- Pippa Pearthree as Corey Alexander
- Chris Pedersen as Kramer
- Wendell Pierce as French
- Glenn Plummer as Hank Barr
- Jeris Poindexter as Schiff
- Tim Russ as Sergeant Lemon
- Patricia Smith as Mrs. Destal
- Wesley Snipes as Bookman
- Byron Thames as Mitty
- Ching Valdes-Aran as Mama-San
- Amy Van Nostrand as Waller
- Kent Williams as Sergeant Allard

== Production ==
Episodes were made for between $400,000 and $600,000 each, which at the time was less than an average network sitcom episode.

The episode, "An Old Ghost Walks the Earth" was filmed in Newhall, CA.

== Episodes ==
No. overall	No. in season	Title	Directed by	Written by	Original release date
1	1	"The Mine"	Georg Stanford Brown	Patrick Sheane Duncan	August 29, 1987
2	2	"Home"	Ray Danton	Ronald Ruin	August 29, 1987
3	3	"The Pass"	Kevin Hooks	Patrick Sheane Duncan	August 29, 1987
4	4	"An Old Ghost Walks the Earth"	Michael Toshiyuki Uno	Adam Rodman	July 20, 1988
5	5	"R & R"	David Burton Morris	Cindy Lou Johnson; Patrick Sheane Duncan	July 20, 1988
6	6	"The Fragging"	Jack Sholder	Patrick Sheane Duncan	August 3, 1988
7	7	"Separated"	Todd Holland	Jim Beaver	August 10, 1988
8	8	"Dusk to Dawn"	Rick King	James Yoshimura	August 17, 1988
9	9	"The Promise"	Lesli Linka Glatter	Cindy Lou Johnson	August 21, 1988

== Awards ==
Awards
Year	Award	Type	Result
1988	Golden Reel Award	Best Sound Editing in Television Episodic – Dialogue & ADR	Won
1988	CableACE Award	Directing a Theatrical or Dramatic Special	Won
1988	CableACE Award	Dramatic Special	Nominated
1989	CableACE Award	Actor in a Dramatic Series: Wesley Snipes	Won
