= The Rag and Bone Shop =

2001 novel by Robert Cormier

- Author: Robert Cormier
- Cover artist: Victor Stabin
- Language: English
- Genre: adult fiction
- Publisher: Delacorte Books for Adult Readers
- Publication date: October 9, 2001
- Publication place: United States
- Media type: Print
- Pages: 154
- ISBN: 978-0-385-72962-8 (hardcover) 978-0440229711 (paper back)
- OCLC: 46671136
- LC Class: PZ7.C81634 Rag 2001
- Reading age: 12-17 years

The Rag and Bone Shop (2001) is Robert Cormier's final novel, published October 9, 2001, eleven months after his death. The novel takes its name from the final line of William Butler Yeats's poem "The Circus Animals' Desertion".

== Plot ==
Jason Dorrant is a lonely twelve-year-old boy who is a suspect in the brutal murder of Alicia Bartlett, the seven-year-old sister of a classmate. Trent, an expert interrogator for the police department who is known to get confessions that seem impossible to obtain and who has never lost a case, is called in to interrogate Jason, who is Alicia's friend and the last known person to see her alive. An ambitious man looking to move up in the ranks, Trent hopes to win the favor of an influential Massachusetts senator. Trent discovers that Jason had few friends prior to the crime save for Alicia, with whom he would regularly visit and complete jigsaw puzzles with. Jason was the last person to see Alicia alive and is the prime suspect, although he doesn't know it – Trent tells Jason that the information he is providing is voluntary.

Trent interrogates Jason in a small white-walled room with no ventilation and a single light bulb dangling from the ceiling, and he twists the information that Jason gives him into a distorted story that makes Jason look guilty of Alicia's murder. Trent makes Jason look like a violent maniac simply because he reads and watches science fiction (accusing him of being unable to discern between fantasy and reality), gaslighting him until the boy begins to doubt his own statements and innocence. Trent brings up Jason's seemingly unprovoked attack on a schoolmate as proof of his capacity for violence; Jason protests that the attack was in response to the schoolmate in question, Bobo Kelton, sexually assaulting a female student, but Jason has no proof of this. Trent begins the interview believing Jason murdered Alicia but comes to realise, via Jason's answers and body language, that he is actually innocent. However, Trent presses the interrogation, determined to extract a confession from Jason. Ultimately, Jason is so mentally pressured by Trent's line of questioning that he comes to believe the policeman's fabrication that he is a bloodthirsty killer. Doubting his own recollections, Jason confesses to the crime of Alicia's murder.

With the confession tape in hand, a triumphant Trent walks towards another detective expecting to be praised for his handiwork, but she looks at Trent accusingly and explains that Alicia's older brother Brad was the killer, not Jason; there were witnesses, and he has been taken into custody. Alicia's older brother and a friend of his initially tried to cover up the crime, but under strict questioning their stories fell apart and Alicia's older brother confessed. The female detective accuses Trent of coercing Jason's confession, and this is reported to his superiors. The result is that Trent has successfully killed his own career; he is not demoted in actual rank, but faces permanent reassignment to overnight shifts and will never be called on to conduct interrogations again.

Meanwhile, with the investigation over and Trent blacklisted by his own actions, Jason is left alone to struggle with inner demons Trent helped create. Jason is unable to decide what he is now: the same person he was before Alicia's murder, or a murderer, a reprehensible person? He ponders, "Did he kill her? No. Could he have killed her? No, but could he kill someone worthy of death? Say, a bully?" In the final twist, Jason fulfills the role that Trent assigned him, grabbing a butcher knife and heading to the local YMCA, where bully Bobo Kelton is.
