= In the Middle of the Night (novel) =

1995 novel by Robert Cormier

- first edition
- Author: Robert Cormier
- Language: English
- Genre: Young adult literature, Suspense
- Publisher: Delacorte Books
- Publication date: 1995
- Publication place: United States
- Media type: Print (Hardcover and Paperback)
- Pages: 180

In the Middle of the Night is a young adult suspense novel by Robert Cormier. It was published in 1995.

== Plot ==
This novel follows 16-year-old Denny Colbert, whose father was involved in a tragic accident that killed 22 children. He is not allowed to drive or answer the phone and his family moves so often that he is always the new kid in school. However, one afternoon, Denny disobeys his parents and answers a phone call, after which he finds himself drawn into a relationship with the mystery caller, someone who wants revenge.

== Awards ==
- 1996 ALA Best Books for Young Adults
- 1997 Texas TAYSHAS High School Reading List
- 1996 ALA Quick Pick for Young Adult Reluctant Readers
