= A Little Raw on Monday Mornings =

1963 novel by Robert Cormier

- First edition
- Author: Robert Cormier
- Cover artist: Ellen Restin
- Language: English
- Genre: Adult Fiction
- Publisher: Sheed and Ward
- Publication date: 1963
- Publication place: United States
- Media type: Print (hardcover)
- Pages: 179 pp

A Little Raw on Monday Mornings is an adult novel published by popular young adult author Robert Cormier in 1963.
