= Tunes for Bears to Dance To =

1992 novel by Robert Cormier

- First edition
- Author: Robert Cormier
- Language: English
- Genre: Young Adult Fiction
- Publisher: Delacorte Press
- Publication date: 1992
- Publication place: United States
- Pages: 101
- ISBN: 0-440-21903-5
- OCLC: 30395632

Tunes for Bears to Dance To is a young adult novel written by American author Robert Cormier that discusses themes of morality from the perspective of an 11-year-old boy named Henry, right after World War Two. The title originates from a line in Gustave Flaubert's Madame Bovary: "The human tongue is like a cracked cauldron on which we beat out tunes to set a bear dancing when we would make the stars weep with our melodies."

== Plot summary ==
11-year-old Henry Cassavant moves with his parents to a new town to escape from the memories of Henry's older brother Eddie, who was hit and killed by a car. Henry contributes to his family by working at a grocery store for Mr. Hairston, a deceptive old man who makes rude and racist comments about the townsfolk that would walk by his store. Despite his gruffness, Mr. Hairston appears to have a special liking for Henry, occasionally giving him candy bars.

Every day, Henry watches an old man leave the "crazy house" near his apartment and disappear down the street. Henry is very curious about what the old man does but cannot follow him because he is recovering from a fractured knee and is on crutches. The day after his leg is healed, Henry follows the old man to an art center, where he meets him in person. From George Graham, the supervisor of the center, Henry learns the old man, Mr. Levine, is a Holocaust survivor who lost his family to the SS. Mr Levine goes to the art center every day to carve out a model of his old hometown, complete with carvings of all the people he had lost, including his wife and children.

Henry and his mother visit Eddie's grave and talk about one day getting a headstone. Henry asks Mr. Hairston if he can somehow find him a good headstone to put over Eddie's grave. Mr. Hairston tells Henry he knows somebody who makes headstones and might be able to. Later, Mr. Hairston changes his mind, telling Henry he will be fired at the end of the week and will not receive the headstone. Henry returns home and finds that his father is being sent to the hospital, to be treated for depression.

Unable to deal with the stress of losing the headstone, his job, and his father in the same day, Henry goes to the art center. He learns that Mr. Levine's village has been given a prize from the city and will be put on display at the town hall. Further into the week, Mr. Hairston tells Henry that he will let him keep the job and he will get his brother's headstone on one condition: he must destroy Mr. Levine's model village.

Not knowing what he should do, Henry hides in the storage room at the art center and finds a mallet. Henry falls asleep in the storage room and when he wakes up, he finds the art center deserted. Henry then finds the mallet and brings it above his head ready to smash the village, before deciding not to do it. Just then, a rat startles Henry and he drops the tool on the village, destroying part of it. Mr. Hairston waits for him at a closed furniture store in the rain. When Henry asks Mr. Hairston why he wanted Mr. Levine's village destroyed, Mr. Hairston explains: "Because he is a Jew." Henry also realizes that Mr. Hairston did it to ruin his innocence. Henry refuses the reward and quits his job.

Henry later visits the art center, where Mr. Levine, unfazed by his village being partially destroyed, is rebuilding it. George tells Henry Mr. Levine is "a survivor" and the ceremony date has been changed. Henry does not tell anyone what he did. Mr. Levine presents Henry with a carving of him like the ones he made for his village.

Henry and his family move back to Frenchtown, where Henry puts Eddie's old baseball bat and ball on his brother's grave as a monument.

== Development ==
=== Publication history ===
The novel was published by Delacorte Books on October 1, 1992.

== Reception ==
The novel received generally positive reviews upon release. Kirkus Reviews complimented the characters, writing that they had "a vigor and authenticity surpassing creations of less accomplished authors." Publishers Weekly positively described the story's emotional weight but criticized some of the characters' actions for being unrealistic.
