= Bianca Hunter =

American actress

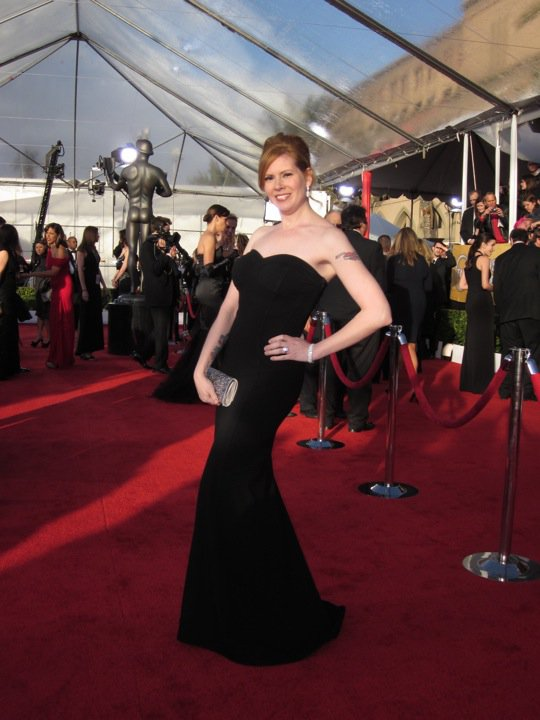
- Hunter at the 2011 SAG Awards
- Born: September 20, 1969 (age 56); New York City, U.S
- Occupation: Actress
- Years active: 1973–present
- Spouse: Robert MacNaughton
- Children: 4

Bianca Hunter (born September 20, 1969) is an American actress. She is best known for her roles in The Fighter (2010), Trees Lounge (1996), and Bad Lieutenant (1992).

== Career ==
Bianca Hunter's first appearance was an uncredited role at the age of 3 in a scene with Al Pacino in Serpico (1973), directed by Sidney Lumet. In 1986 she appeared in the music video "Papa Don't Preach" by Madonna with Danny Aiello and Debi Mazar. At 18, Hunter played Karen Hill's (Lorraine Bracco) best friend in the wedding scene in Goodfellas (1990). After seeing her harrowing portrayal of a teen being sexually harassed by Harvey Keitel in Abel Ferrara's Bad Lieutenant (1992), Steve Buscemi cast her in his directorial debut Trees Lounge (1996). She has appeared in a dozen films including the David O. Russell-directed biographical film The Fighter (2010), nominated for seven Academy Awards and winning the awards for Best Supporting Actor (Christian Bale) and Best Supporting Actress (Melissa Leo). Hunter portrayed one of the seven sisters of Christian Bale and Mark Wahlberg. Her performance in The Fighter, received accolades resulting in several nominations and wins for Best Ensemble Cast. She was the female lead in Laugh Killer Laugh opposite William Forsythe and Tom Sizemore.

== Personal life ==
Hunter was born and raised in New York City. Her father, William Hunter, is an artist, and her mother, Pat Hunter Hicklin, who died in 1998, was a former model turned Montessori school teacher. Her godmother is actress Carol Kane. After high school, Hunter married NYC punk band Reagan Youth guitarist and co-founder Paul Bakija and is credited as Bianca Bakija in her first two movie roles. She is now married to her third husband Robert MacNaughton, who portrayed Elliot's older brother in E.T. the Extra-Terrestrial. They were set up on a blind date by mutual friend, MacNaughton's E.T. co-star Drew Barrymore when Hunter was a teenager. Together they have four sons, Henry, Harley, Hunter, and Noah.

== Filmography ==
Film roles
Year	Title	Role	Notes
1973	Serpico	N/A	Uncredited
1992	Bad Lieutenant	Jersey Girl – Driver	Credited as Bianca Bakija
1996	Trees Lounge	Kelly	
1997	Kicked in the Head	Pearl	
1999	The 24 Hour Woman	Young Woman	
2001	Chelsea Walls	Lorna Doone	
2001	American Saint	Daphne	
2004	100 Lovers of Jesus Reynolds	Mermaid	Short film
2010	Circus Maximus	Therapist	
2010	The Fighter	Cathy 'Pork' Eklund	
2012	Brutal	Patty	
2015	Laugh Killer Laugh	Jackie	

Music video roles
Year	Title	Artist	Notes
1986	"Papa Don't Preach"	Madonna	
1987	"Christmas In Hollis"	Run-DMC	
