= We All Fall Down (Cormier novel) =

Novel by Robert Cormier

- First edition
- Author: Robert Cormier
- Genre: Suspense, Chivalric Romance
- Publisher: Delacorte Press
- Publication date: October 1991
- Publication place: United States
- Media type: Print (Hardback & Paperback)
- Pages: 199
- ISBN: 0-385-30501-X (first edition, hardback)
- OCLC: 23583887

We All Fall Down (1991) is a suspense novel for young adults written by Robert Cormier.

== Plot ==
In the small town of Burnside, the Jerome family's house is destroyed by teenage vandals, who defecate on the floors and push their daughter down the stairs, placing her in a coma. A childlike stalker calling himself "The Avenger" witnesses the incident and, enraged, begins to track down each culprit.

== Characters ==
Characters in We All Fall Down are Jane Jerome, Buddy Walker, and The Avenger. After the vandalism, the book separates into three discrete storylines: one from Jane's point of view, which reveals how she and her family feel after the trashing; one from Buddy's point of view, which reveals his problems, family, and friends; and one from the Avenger's point of view, which reveals his cruel past and plans and cares.

=== Jane Jerome ===
In the novel, Jane Jerome, 16, is one of the main characters. She goes to high school and lives with her parents, her younger sister, Karen, and her younger brother, Artie, in a small town named Burnside.

After the trashing early in the novel, Jane feels bad about arguing with her sister. A lot of thoughts come to her about her relationship with Karen. The incident in the house and Karen's coma make Jane’s behavior change. She feels less comfortable in her home. Then she goes out with Buddy Walker. She allows him to kiss her, hug her, and caress her. She thinks that when she is with Buddy everything is wonderful and her troubles go away.

=== Buddy Walker ===
Buddy Walker, 16, changes after his family breaks down by his father's divorce. Drunk and goaded by his friend Harry Flowers, he was one of the vandals but played the least role. Later on in the story, he starts noticing Jane and begins to fall for her and fills the empty hole with the love for Jane.

=== The Avenger ===
Mickey "Looney" Stallings, a middle-aged man, frequently refers himself as The Avenger, and desires to punish all deemed evil by him. In his youth, Mickey assassinated school bully Vaughn Materson with a handgun, and later killed his grandfather to prevent raising suspicion. He vows to track down the vandals and later attempts to kill Jane for dating Buddy, one of the perpetrators. Jane eventually goads him into killing himself.

== Reception ==
Because of its frank language and adult themes, it is named one of the top 100 most challenged books from 1990 to 2000, by the American Library Association, and has been banned from some libraries. In 2003, it was in the top 10 most challenged books reported to the Office for Intellectual Freedom.

Despite the controversy surrounding this novel, We All Fall Down received positive reviews from School Library Journal, The Horn Book Magazine, Kirkus Reviews, and Publishers Weekly.

=== Challenges ===
In 1998, a parent in Simcoe County (ON) complained to their children’s school board about We All Fall Down, because she believed the violence in the novel was inappropriate for children to read in school. The school board moved the novel from the primary schools to the high schools in that district, though the parent remained unsatisfied.

In November 2000, parents in Tamaqua, Pennsylvania complained about We all Fall Down because of the violence in several scenes, as well as the description of suicide in the book. Officials in the school district created a new book selection policy in response to the parents' objections.

In March 2000, We All Fall Down was removed from the Carver Middle School in Leesburg, Florida, because parents of a sixth-grader who was studying the book were unhappy with the language used in the novel. The father of the student, said, “It’s not a book for school. It’s everything negative about society, like rape, vulgarity, alcohol abuse, murder and how to cover it up.” The principal of the middle school agreed, and the book was removed from the school library. The principal also held a faculty meeting to advise staff to look carefully at the books they are assigning to children. The principal even contacted other middle schools in the district to warn them of the challenged novel.

On March 17, 2000, an Arlington, Texas Independent School District Superintendent ordered the library circulation of We All Fall Down to be restricted, requiring students to bring written permission from their parents in order to borrow it. The superintendent did this in response to a complaint from a parent regarding violence in the book. The book was not removed completely, because a panel of school librarians made a decision to retain it in middle and high schools.

In 2023, the book was banned, in Clay County District Schools, Florida.

== Awards ==
In 1994, We All Fall Down won the California Young Reader Medal.
