= Heroes (novel) =

Novel by Robert Cormier

- First edition
- Author: Robert Cormier
- Language: English
- Genre: Young Adult Psychological Thriller
- Publisher: Delacorte Press
- Publication date: 1998
- Publication place: United States
- Media type: Hardcover
- Pages: 135

Heroes is a 1998 novel written by Robert Cormier. The novel is centred on the character Francis Cassavant, a disfigured young man who has just returned to his childhood home of Frenchtown, Massachusetts, from serving in the Second World War in order to take revenge on a man who sexually assaulted his childhood sweetheart. The structure of the novel involves the use of flashbacks to Francis's childhood in Frenchtown and the events in Frenchtown following the war, when Francis returns.

== Plot ==
In 1939, teenager Francis Cassavant and his childhood sweetheart Nicole Renard, as well as most young people in Frenchtown, frequent the 'Wreck Centre', the town's recreation centre, headed by charismatic and well-known local figure Larry LaSalle, who was renowned for transforming the lives of the town's children via sports, crafts and dance lessons.

Larry takes a liking to Francis and Nicole especially: he encourages Francis to take up table tennis, at which Francis excels, winning a tournament. He also encourages Nicole to dance which she excels at, too.

In 1941, Pearl Harbor is attacked, and Larry is one of the first men of Frenchtown to enlist in the forces, becoming a marine. While Larry is absent fighting in the Second World War, Francis and Nicole's relationship blossoms. Larry is regularly featured in the news due to his acts of bravery and valor.

In 1942, Larry returns to Frenchtown on leave, and after a celebration welcoming him, he takes the young people to the Wreck Centre. After further festivities, everyone eventually leaves except Larry, Francis and Nicole. Larry orders Francis to leave so he can dance with Nicole, but she silently begs Francis to stay. Francis, not willing to disobey Larry due to the influence Larry has over him, leaves sheepishly to the exit, but intends to return to Nicole after her and Larry finish dancing. However, Larry turns of the center's lights as they dance and when the song ends, he rapes Nicole, which Francis hears. Four days later, Francis visits Nicole at her home. She blames Francis for what occurred and Francis similarly blames himself.

Depressed and suicidal following the incident, Francis enlists in the army and attempts to kill himself by throwing himself onto a grenade. However, this backfires and he is left alive but severely disfigured with facial deformities. Francis is discharged from the forces and received a Silver Star medal for his perceived bravery in action. In 1945, Francis, now an eighteen-year-old, returns to Frenchtown and is not recognized by the locals due to his injuries. He returns with the intention to murder Larry as revenge for what he did to Nicole.

Francis, with a gun, visits the now older and weaker Larry in his home to confront him. Larry attempts to manipulate Francis as he did when he was younger, telling him there was nothing he could do to stop the rape as he was just a child and that he should leave, but Francis replies that Nicole was just a child, too. Larry takes out his own gun and Francis eventually leaves, believing that Larry's current condition is an appropriate punishment, as he is in a far worse state that being dead. As he leaves, Larry realises his solitude and shoots himself in the head. Francis hears this, and silently leaves.

Francis visits a local school where Nicole is staying and tells her he understands he can never rekindle their relationship, but Nicole kisses him and apologizes to Francis for accusing him of something which he was powerless to prevent. They solemnly say goodbye and go their separate ways.

== Themes ==
The novel has a very complicated outlook on heroism and what defines a hero. Francis is considered to be a hero as his actions during the war saved the lives of others, but the reader is asked to consider if cowardly actions can result in heroic consequences.

The ramifications of war are explored within the text, arguably with the trauma inflicted upon Nicole & Francis by Larry LaSalle representing the way war pays no regard to its effect on people, especially the young.

Religion is also a key theme as Francis is a devoted Catholic. The place of religion within the community of Frenchtown is often emphasized and the values instilled through his Catholic upbringing affects the decisions that Francis makes throughout his ď. He also does not acknowledge that he is a hero.

== Characters ==
There are three main characters in the book:

- Francis Cassavant: the main protagonist of the book. He narrates the story in a series of flashbacks, after throwing himself on a grenade to supposedly save his fellow soldiers in the war. This disfigures his face badly; his skin being burnt, 'no ears to speak of except for bits of dangling flesh', his teeth being blown out by the explosion but replaced by dentures, his hair has also been described as falling out. Francis's nostrils are often spoken of as the physical disfigurement which plagues him the most, as they often run and have caused him to wear a bandage over them, secured with a pin at the back of his head which makes it difficult for him to clean. Francis tells how his unsightly appearance often shocks and disturbs passers-by, and as a measure to prevent this wears a white, silk aviator's scarf around the lower half of his face given to him by his hospital friend Enrico, and a Red Sox cap lowered down over his face. Whilst at school he met Nicole Renard and instantly fell in love with her, and continues to be so until at the end of the book. Francis is skilled at table-tennis after having been taught by Larry LaSalle at the 'Wreck Center', and in his Wreck Center days won a trophy for winning a series of table-tennis matches, culminating in the winning match against Larry LaSalle, despite LaSalle 'letting him win'. Although Francis did not enlist as he was not of age when the war began, after Nicole Renard was sexually assaulted and he, mentally traumatized, decided to 'kill himself'. He decided against jumping off the chapel top, and instead lied into the army and some time in the war threw himself on top of a grenade. His plan backfired as this did not kill him, merely mutilated him horribly, and his actions were seen as bravery for defending his comrades and he was given a Silver Star medal for outstanding courage. Throughout the book Francis's main mission is to wait for Larry LaSalle to come back to Frenchtown so he can shoot with a gun he carries in his duffel bag in revenge for LaSalle assaulting Nicole. However he leaves that job to Larry who kills himself anyway.
- Nicole Renard: Nicole moves to Frenchtown from Albany and immediately becomes the subject of Francis's attention. Later she is involved in the events concerning Larry LaSalle, who taught her dancing in the 'Wreck Centre'. At the end of the novel, she returns to Albany in an attempt to escape the traumatic memories of her ordeal with LaSalle. Nicole has clearly moved on from the experience with Larry, when Francis visits near the end of the novel the love between the two has disappeared, something which deeply upsets Francis.
- Larry LaSalle: LaSalle is the main antagonist of the novel, but during the earlier chapters he is described as a very positive and talented person. He holds classes at the Wreck Centre after his return to Frenchtown and uses his wide range of talents to bring out the best in the young people he works with. He had a very close relationship with Francis and Nicole and he is the main focus of Francis's mission due to his treatment and abuse of Nicole, but after his encounter with Francis, he ends up committing suicide himself.

There are many other characters in the novel that are important but not as important as Francis, Nicole and Larry:

- Arthur Rivier: Another veteran from Frenchtown. He takes Francis to the St Jude Club and buys him a drink. He interacts in a positive way with the other veterans but it later becomes clear that he too is traumatized by his experience at war. He once played baseball for the Frenchtown Tigers and recognizes Francis by the sound of his voice.
- Mrs Belander: Francis's landlady. She feels sympathy towards Francis, as he is a veteran and is the person who inadvertently reveals that Larry LaSalle has returned to Frenchtown.
- Joey LeBlanc: Joey and Francis were childhood friends and went to the cinema together. He was a troublesome figure at school as he used to be talkative. He is a confident person and seems to be the antithesis of Francis. He also became a soldier, and is said to have died at Iwo Jima.
- Enrico Rucelli: Francis met Enrico during his time at war. His experiences are used to show the extent of war as he lost both his legs and his left arm. He has a cheerful attitude despite his injuries but he does feel despair.
- Dr. Abrams: Doctor to Francis when he was in the war.

== Themes & Context ==
=== Depression ===
Many of the flashbacks in the novel refer to the Great Depression which was an effect of the Wall Street Crash of 1929. Many families then were poor and underfed. in 1932, Franklin Roosevelt was elected. He began the New Deal, which aimed to solve some of the problems within the country, such as unemployment. One of the schemes was for the government to employ people. This is seen in chapter 5 where Francis talks about people, renovating the 'Wreck Centre', who had been hired under a new municipal program.

=== Second World War ===
On 7 December 1941, the Japanese Empire carried out through the attack on Pearl Harbor, a Hawaiian island. The US then came into the Second World War taking them out of the policy of isolationism.

Fighting occurs both in Europe, where Francis is deployed, and in the Pacific. The novel explores the effects of Pearl Harbor on Frenchtown, as the Wreck Centre closes because of Larry's absence. Many men are recruited to the armed forces, and women are given service jobs in the local factories to make products for the war effort.

=== The GI ===
The GI Bill is mentioned in the text in regards to the later plans of the veterans, which they discuss in the St Jude Club. Joe LaFontaine speaks about how the government would be willing to pay for his college education and intends to become a teacher. However, the positive outlook is shown to be false, as the veterans are later presented as pessimistic people, especially Arthur Rivier, who struggles to cope with not talking about the war.

== Reception ==
Publishers Weekly called it a “thriller” that “will hold fans from first page to last.” It also said it had "complex characters", the “audience will tensely await the inevitable”, and the author was "at the top of his game." Besides, "what really lurks behind the face of a hero." Heroes won the Young Adult Library Services Association Best Books for Young Adults Award in 1999.

Heroes and seventeen other books were challenged by Richard and Alice Ess, founders of the Fairfax County, Virginia group Parents Against Bad Books in Schools. The Complainants requested that no members of the ALA or NEA serve on the reconsideration committees because these organizations “are officially against any attempts at removal of books from any school”. School officials estimated that each challenge cost the school district around $2,600.

=== Use in education ===
The novel has been studied in Wales and England by students aged 14 to 16 as part of the GCSE English Literature syllabus under the WJEC examination board.
