= Beyond the Chocolate War =

Novel by Robert Cormier

- First edition
- Author: Robert Cormier
- Language: English
- Genre: Young adult novel
- Publisher: Alfred A. Knopf
- Publication date: 1985
- Publication place: United States
- Media type: Print (Paperback)
- Pages: 253 pp
- ISBN: 0-394-87343-2
- OCLC: 11261946
- LC Class: PZ7.C81634 Be 1985
- Preceded by: The Chocolate War

Beyond the Chocolate War is the sequel to the award-winning book The Chocolate War by Robert Cormier. The sequel received an Honor List citation from the Horn Book Magazine in 1986. It takes place during the same school year as the first novel, and continues the story of the students at Trinity, a Catholic boys' academy, and its secret society, the Vigils.

== Synopsis ==
The novel is composed of four parts. Many of the major and minor characters originally seen in The Chocolate War reappear, and new characters are also introduced. The events of the book take place some time after the events described in The Chocolate War, but during the same school year.

=== Part One ===
Ray Bannister, a student who has recently transferred to Trinity, a Catholic all-boys academy in the fictional town of Monument, Massachusetts, finds himself lonely and isolated following an unsuccessful attempt to make friends. Having gleaned an enthusiasm for stage magic from his father, Ray begins to construct a guillotine. Obie finds himself distracted from his secretarial duties within the Vigils, Trinity's secretive student society, after falling in love with Laurie Gundarson, a local girl. Aware of Obie's infatuation, and with a desire to maintain control by sowing distrust, Archie Costello, the Vigils' 'Assigner' and nominal leader, encourages the ambitions of Bunting - a school sophomore and Obie's shadow. With a rising distrust of Archie, Carter, the Vigils’ elected President, resolves to exploit the increasing antagonism between Archie and Obie if he can. Archie formulates an ambitious assignment: the entire student body, with the exception of Ray Bannister, will abstain from school on the day of a visit by the local Bishop. Gravely injured after the staged boxing match between him and Emile Janza, Jerry Renault remains at home after convalescing in Canada. Roland 'Goober' Goubert, Jerry's former best friend, receives a phone call from Jerry's father, imploring him to visit. Obie drafts Ray into the mass stay-away assignment. The two boys form a tentative friendship, with Obie confiding his growing ambivalence toward the Vigils and their sinister stance. Supplanting Trinity's previous headmaster, the insidious Brother Leon moves to consolidate power. Leon and Archie reluctantly affirm the mutual dependency that allows them both to pursue their own ends. Leon reveals to Archie that Brother Eugene, the target of the Vigils' Room Nineteen sabotage in The Chocolate War, is now dead. When Leon implies that the sabotage caused an emotional breakdown from which Jacques never recovered, Archie reacts with indifference. Resentful that Archie's staging of the public boxing match between Renault and Janza caused Brother Leon to retaliate by eliminating boxing as a school sport and frightened at the potential repercussions of the upcoming mass stayaway, Carter sends Brother Leon an anonymous note, warning of 'Bad things' that may happen during the Bishop's visit. Confronted by Leon, Archie denies all knowledge, but deduces immediately that there is an informer among the Vigils. Hoping to repair the friendship fractured by his failure to help save Jerry from the violence of the public boxing match, the Goober visits Jerry at home, but both boys are traumatised and wounded, interpreting the ensuing emotional discomfort as proof that their relationship cannot be salvaged. Obie, increasingly physically attracted to Laurie and frustrated at her refusal to consummate their seemingly mutual desire, realises that his membership of the Vigils may be the source of Laurie’s ambivalence. Misinterpreting Archie's intentions toward Obie, and misguidedly confident of Archie's protection, Bunting bushwhacks a makeout session and attempts to rape Laurie, destroying Obie and Laurie's relationship in the process. David Caroni, traumatised after being coerced into providing information on Vigil intentions by Brother Leon, contemplates suicide, but fails to commit it.

=== Part Two ===
Bunting compounds his earlier error by attempting to coerce Archie into providing an alibi for the night of the attempted rape. Archie turns Bunting down in distaste. Archie convenes an impromptu Vigil meeting, ostensibly to assign the already overweight Ernest 'Tubs' Casper to gain an extra twenty pounds, but in reality to satisfy himself that Obie does not suspect Bunting, and to identify the traitor among the Vigils. Archie successfully identifies Carter as the traitor, beginning his campaign of retribution by tormenting Carter into a telephonic confession. With a memory of Laurie's assailant wearing distinctive buckled loafers, Obie identifies the owner of the loafers as Vincent ‘Corny’ Cornacchio, Bunting's stooge. David Caroni's mental deterioration continues as he indulges in fantasies of murdering Brother Leon, and appears to settle on an ultimate plan of murder-suicide. Jerry and the Goober re-establish communication and begin to repair their friendship. Jerry asks Goober never to talk about the night of the boxing match, and Goober asks Jerry to reciprocate by never mentioning the Room Nineteen sabotage and its effect on Brother Eugene. Obie successfully pressures Cornacchio into identifying Bunting as Laurie's assailant. However, Cornacchio complicates matters by relaying Bunting's faulty assertion that Archie had both directly ordered the rape, and promised to provide Bunting with an alibi.

=== Part Three ===
Having determined that Jerry is back in Monument, Janza fixates on him. Laurie finally rejects Obie, citing his membership of the Vigils and her romantic indifference to him. Believing Archie to be the root cause of the destruction of his relationship with Laurie, Obie decides to take revenge, tricking Archie into the role of Fool during Trinity's 'Fair Day', and gaining Ray's confidence with the goal of ensuring Ray's guillotine can successfully be used to kill Archie. Afraid of ruining his chance to ingratiate himself with Archie, Bunting is surprised to hear confirmation of his appointment as Vigils assigner for the following year, on condition that Emile Janza is made his assistant. Archie reveals his plan for anarchy to be wreaked on Trinity after he departs, revealing himself as a charismatic psychopath. Having defeated 'The Box' - the Vigils' safeguard against Assigner overreach - for years through sleight of hand, Archie is tricked by Obie and Carter into the role of 'Fool' during Fair Day. Having realised that Jerry and the Goober are tailing him, Janza ambushes them. Janza beats up Jerry a third time, but is frustrated and troubled at the endurance and determination that lead Jerry to outlast him. In a renewed spirit of nonviolent resistance, Jerry resolves not to move back to Canada, but to return to Trinity the following year instead. Disturbed by what he perceives as Jerry's self-destructive impulse, the Goober resolves to end their friendship over the coming summer vacation, simultaneously reviling himself for his own cowardice. Archie dutifully carries out his assignment as the Fool, unsurprised that no Trinity student dares humiliate him. Intending to kill Brother Leon, David Caroni ambushes him with a knife, but botches his attempt. Caroni flees Trinity, committing suicide by jumping from a railway overpass. During Trinity’s 'Skit Night', Obie attempts to murder Archie, still in the role of Fool, by deliberately re-arming the guillotine Ray had previously disarmed. The guillotine’s blade falls as planned, but Archie's life is spared by a failsafe mechanism Obie was unaware of. Obie is disturbed by the realisation that it took his attempt on Archie's life for Archie to develop a genuine respect for him. Hearing Obie's stated motive for attempted murder - righteous retribution for the misery and devastation Archie has wrought - Archie counters by pointing out the social inertia and diffusion of responsibility that have allowed him to operate as an oppressive influence, and in turn accuses Obie of scapegoating and complicity. Archie ends his argument with the notion that he himself is not evil, but merely enables latent evil in those he touches.

=== Part Four ===
At the final assembly of the school year, Brother Leon delivers a self-important speech that superficially seems to mourn David Caroni, but quickly turns a personal acceptance of responsibility into victim blaming and a projection of his own guilt onto the Trinity student body. Leon is publicly humiliated when a tomato thrown from the audience hits him. Janza voices the violent plans with which Archie has primed him, stating his intent to effectively turn Trinity into a student-ruled paramilitary dictatorship the following year. Simultaneously weak-willed and lured by the prospect of imminent power, Bunting accedes.

== Book ban ==
In 2023, the book was banned in Clay County District Schools, Florida.
