= I Am the Cheese (film) =

1983 film by Robert Jiras

- Film poster
- Directed by: Robert Jiras
- Written by: Robert Jiras; David Lange; Robert Cormier (Novel)
- Produced by: David Lange
- Starring: Robert MacNaughton; Cynthia Nixon; Robert Wagner
- Edited by: Nicholas C. Smith
- Music by: Jonathan Tunick
- Distributed by: Almi Pictures
- Release date: November 11, 1983
- Running time: 100 minutes
- Country: United States
- Language: English

I Am the Cheese is a 1983 American film adaptation of Robert Cormier's 1977 novel of the same name, about a young man's journey to find the truth behind his family. The film was directed by Robert Jiras and filmed in Vermont.

== Plot ==
Fifteen-year-old Adam Farmer seeks to unearth the many secrets locked in his unconscious mind. Adam's journey through his mind is paralleled with a bike trip to Rutterburg, Vermont, with a package for his father. As he travels through several small towns, he starts to remember past events from his life.

Adam's trip is prompted by a call from his girlfriend Amy, who says her father met a reporter from Adam's alleged hometown of Rawlings, Pennsylvania, and the reporter had never heard of anyone named Farmer living there. Suspicious, Adam begins spying on his parents and finds two birth certificates with his name on them, but with different birthdates - February 14 (Valentine's Day) and July 14 (Bastille Day). Adam confronts his father, who admits some shocking truths.

Adam's real name is Paul Delmonte and the family was forced to relocate in a Witness Protection-type program after his father testified in state and federal trials against corrupt government officials. In reality, Adam is not biking to Vermont; he is riding in circles around the psychiatric facility where he has been held for the past three years, and the people he meets along the way are patients and workers at the facility. His "journey" is a quest to discover the whereabouts of his parents, who mysteriously disappeared (in truth, they were "terminated" by the adversaries they sought to elude). The memories Adam recounts are documented in "psychiatric sessions," which are, in fact, interviews to determine whether or not he knows more about his father's involvement with the government than he's telling. Adam's final interview ends with two possible outcomes, neither of which bode well for the boy: "Terminating" him or continuing to question him until he dies.

== Cast ==
- Robert MacNaughton as Paul Delmonte / Adam Farmer
  - Frank McGurren as young Adam
- Cynthia Nixon as Amy Hertz
- Robert Wagner as Dr. Brint
- Don Murray as Anthony Delmonte / David Farmer
- Hope Lange as Betty Farmer
- Lee Richardson as Mr. Grey
- Robert Cormier as Mr. Hertz
- John Fiedler as Arnold
- Sudie Bond as Edna
