= Other Bells for Us to Ring =

1990 novel by Robert Cormier

- First edition
- Author: Robert Cormier
- Cover artist: Deborah Ray
- Language: English
- Genre: Young adult literature
- Publisher: Delacorte Press
- Publication date: 1990
- Publication place: United States
- Media type: Print (Hardcover and Paperback)
- Pages: 152
- ISBN: 0-440-22862-X
- OCLC: 45289120

Other Bells for Us to Ring (1990) is the U.S. author Robert Cormier's first novel for young readers (10–12 years). Prior to this he published three novels for adults, six novels for teenagers and one volume of short stories for teenagers. The book was published in the United Kingdom in 1991 under the title Darcy.

== Plot introduction ==
Eleven-year-old Darcy Webster never had a best friend until her father joined the army, bringing his family to Frenchtown in Monument, near Fort Delta, Massachusetts. There, she became friends with Kathleen Mary O'Hara.

Darcy had always been a Unitarian. That is until Kathleen Mary sprinkled her with holy water declaring, "Now you're a Catholic, Darcy Webster. Forever and ever, world without end, Amen." Darcy never had a chance to ask Kathleen Mary if she was joking because Kathleen Mary's father went on a rampage, sending him to jail and splitting up the O'Hara family.

Darcy struggled with her religion, questioning whether a little bit of holy water and a declaration by an eleven-year-old could make her Catholic, and what to do, how to pray, and whether God truly exists. Things became more complicated when a letter came home to Darcy and her mother stating that Mr. Webster was missing in action.

== Characters ==
- Darcy Webster - A shy eleven-year-old girl struggling to grow up and find her beliefs about life and religion in the midst of a war.
- William Webster - Darcy's father, a recovering alcoholic, an engineer, and a US soldier who built bridges and went missing in action after he and his fellow soldiers were bombed.
- Abby Webster - Darcy's mother, who has migraines.
- Kathleen Mary O'Hara - An eleven-year-old Irish girl and Darcy's best friend who takes her on adventures and shows her the world of Catholicism.
- John Francis O'Hara - Kathleen Mary's fifteen-year-old brother and her "protector."
- Mr. O'Hara - Kathleen Mary's father, a raging alcoholic who cannot join the army because of a leg injury.
- Sister Angela - The Catholic nun watched by Kathleen Mary as she prays for people on weekends. Darcy visits Sister Angela when Darcy becomes desperate about her father being missing.
- The LeBlancs - The Webster's French neighbours. Mrs. LeBlanc does not speak English, but Mr. LeBlanc translates for her. They comfort Darcy and her mother while Mr. Webster is at war and missing in action.
