= Chelsea Walls =

2001 film by Ethan Hawke

- Theatrical release poster
- Directed by: Ethan Hawke
- Written by: Nicole Burdette
- Based on: Cheslea Walls by Nicole Burdette
- Produced by: Gary Winick; Alexis Alexanian; Christine Vachon; Pamela R. Koffler
- Starring: Kris Kristofferson; Uma Thurman; Robert Sean Leonard; Tuesday Weld; Kevin Corrigan; Bianca Hunter; Vincent D'Onofrio; Natasha Richardson; Rosario Dawson
- Cinematography: Tom Richmond
- Edited by: Adriana Pacheco
- Music by: Jeff Tweedy
- Production companies: Killer Films; IFC Films
- Distributed by: Lions Gate Films
- Release dates: September 21, 2001 (Woodstock Film Festival); April 19, 2002 (United States)
- Running time: 109 minutes
- Country: United States
- Language: English
- Budget: $100,000
- Box office: $60,902

Chelsea Walls is a 2001 American drama film directed by Ethan Hawke in his directorial debut and written by Nicole Burdette, based on her 1990 play of the same name. It stars Kris Kristofferson, Uma Thurman, Robert Sean Leonard, Tuesday Weld in her final film, Kevin Corrigan, Bianca Hunter, Vincent D'Onofrio, Natasha Richardson and Rosario Dawson. The story takes place in the historic Chelsea Hotel in Manhattan.

Cheslea Walls premiered at the 2001 Woodstock Film Festival, and was released in theaters in the United States on April 19, 2002, by Lionsgate Films.

== Plot ==
The film tells five stories of a number of artists as they spend a single day in New York's famed bohemian home Chelsea Hotel, struggling with their arts and personal lives.

== Cast ==
- Kris Kristofferson as Bud
- Uma Thurman as Grace
- Robert Sean Leonard as Terry Olsen
- Vincent D'Onofrio as Frank
- Natasha Richardson as Mary
- Rosario Dawson as Audrey
- Mark Webber as Val
- Frank Whaley as Lynny Barnum
- Kevin Corrigan as "Crutches"
- Guillermo Díaz as Kid
- Bianca Hunter as Lorna Doone
- Matthew Del Negro as Rookie Cop
- Paz de la Huerta as Girl
- Paul Failla as Cop
- Duane McLaughlin as Wall
- Jimmy Scott as "Skinny Bones"
- John Seitz as Dean
- Mark Strand as Journalist
- Heather Watts as Ballerina
- Tuesday Weld as Greta
- Harris Yulin as Bud's Editor
- Steve Zahn as Ross
- Sam Connelly, Richard Linklater, and Peter Salett as Cronies

== Reception ==
On review aggregator Rotten Tomatoes, 26% of 47 critics gave the film a positive review, with an average rating of 4.2/10, earning it a score of "Rotten". The website's critics consensus reads, "The meandering Chelsea Walls is more pretentious than poetic." On Metacritic, the film holds a weighted average score of 34 out of 100, based on 18 critics, indicating "generally unfavorable" reviews.

Roger Ebert gave the film three stars out of four, claiming: "Movies like this do not grab you by the throat. You have to be receptive. The first time I saw "Chelsea Walls," in a stuffy room late at night at Cannes 2001, I found it slow and pointless. This time, I saw it earlier in the day, fueled by coffee, and I understood that the movie is not about what the characters do, but about what they are. It may be a waste of time to spend your life drinking, fornicating, posing as a genius and living off your friends, but if you've got the money, honey, take off the time."
