= Take Me Where the Good Times Are =

1965 novel by Robert Cormier

- First edition
- Author: Robert Cormier
- Cover artist: J. Sposato
- Language: English
- Genre: Novel
- Publisher: Macmillan
- Publication date: 1965
- Publication place: United States
- Media type: Print (hardback & paperback)

Take Me Where the Good Times Are is a novel by Robert Cormier. First published in 1965, it is Cormier's third novel.

== Plot ==
This story features Tommy Bartin, a 70-year-old resident at the Dorchester County, Maryland poorhouse. When another resident leaves Tommy some cash, he sees his opportunity to go back to the area he grew up in. However, Tommy finds that his old town has changed substantially over time, and he hopes to find a way to be useful again, and to regain his self-respect.

== Themes ==
Themes in this story include the quality of denial and facing reality even if it is undesirable.
