= A-Haunting We Will Go =

A-Haunting We Will Go may refer to:

- A Haunting We Will Go, a 1939 animated short film directed by Burt Gillett
- A-Haunting We Will Go (1942 film), a 1942 Laurel and Hardy comedy film
- A Haunting We Will Go (1949 film), a 1949 animated short film directed by Seymour Kneitel
- A-Haunting We Will Go (1966 film), a 1966 theatrical Looney Tunes cartoon directed by Robert McKimson

== See also ==
- "A-Hunting We Will Go", a 1777 English folk song and nursery rhyme
