= Fade (novel) =

1988 novel by Robert Cormier

- First edition
- Author: Robert Cormier
- Language: English
- Genre: Young adult fiction
- Publisher: Delacorte Press
- Publication date: 1988
- Publication place: United States
- Media type: Print
- Pages: 320
- ISBN: 0-385-73134-5
- OCLC: 57385491
- LC Class: MLCS 2006/43456

Fade is a 1988 young adult novel written by Robert Cormier.

== Plot ==
In the summer of 1938, the young Paul Moreaux, who lives in a town outside of Boston called Monument, discovers he can "fade", becoming invisible. His family has had this ability generation after generation; it is somehow passed down from uncle to nephew.

Bewildered and then thrilled with the possibilities of invisibility, Paul experiments with his "gift". He sees things that he should not witness. His power soon overloads him, shows him shocking secrets, pushes him over the edge, and drives him toward some chilling and horrible acts for which there is no forgiveness, no forgetting, and no turning back. Paul discovers how cruel, evil, and disgusting the world can be, and how the ability to fade becomes a nightmare.

== Reception ==
Fade's scenes of murder and incest have made it a frequent target of censors; the novel appears on the American Library Association list of the 100 Most Frequently Challenged Books of 1990–2000 at number 65.

== Film adaptation ==
In January 2009, Darko Entertainment acquired the rights to the novel. The company will adapt and produce a film adaptation. The novel will be adapted by Adam Prince and the film will be produced by Richard Kelly, Sean McKittrick, Ted Hamm and Ilene Staple. As of August 2023, there has yet to be any additional information regarding the release of the film adaptation.
