= Robert MacNaughton =

American actor (born 1966)

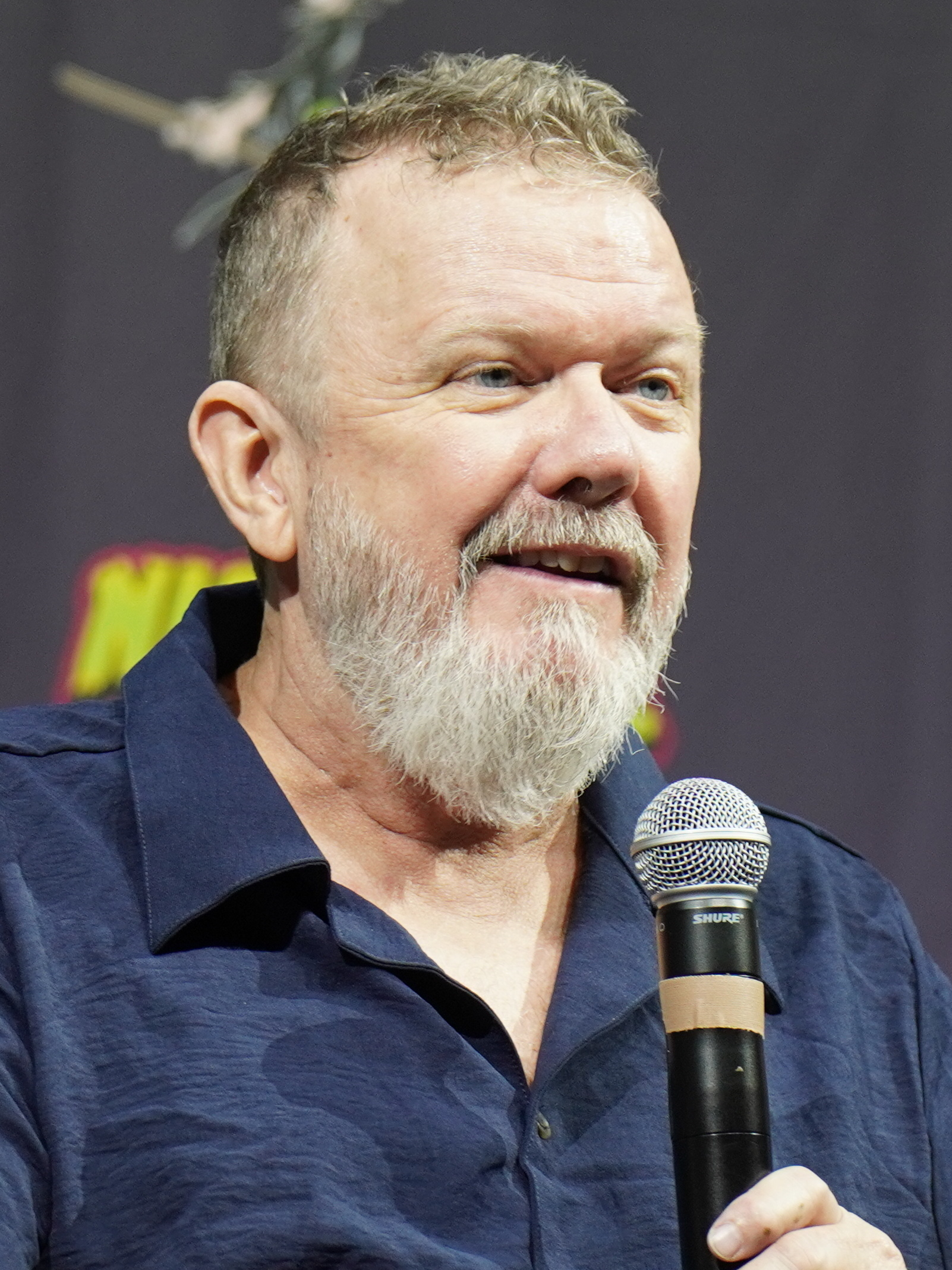
- MacNaughton in 2023 at Nightmare Weekend, Richmond VA
- Born: December 19, 1966 (age 59)
- Occupation: Actor
- Years active: 1980–2015
- Spouse: Bianca Hunter (m. 2012)

Robert MacNaughton (born December 19, 1966) is an American actor. He is best known for his role as Elliott's brother Michael in E.T. the Extra-Terrestrial, for which he won a 1982 Young Artist Award as Best Young Supporting Actor in a Motion Picture. MacNaughton also played the lead role of Adam Farmer in the 1983 film I Am the Cheese, based on the young adult novel by Robert Cormier.

== Biography ==
MacNaughton primarily worked in the theater, both before and after E.T., performing with the Circle Repertory Company, where he originated the role of Buddy Layman in Jim Leonard Jr.'s The Diviners. MacNaughton performed with Kevin Kline in Henry V at the New York Shakespeare Festival in Central Park. He played Hally in Athol Fugard's "Master Harold"...and the Boys for South Coast Repertory, and has also performed with the Long Wharf Theater and Seattle Repertory, among many others. His television appearances include Dennis Potter's Visitors for the BBC, Vietnam War Story for HBO, Newhart, and Amen, among other television programs and television films.

MacNaughton retired from acting in 2002. He then worked as a mail handler at the bulk facilities in Phoenix, Arizona, and Jersey City, New Jersey. In 2013, MacNaughton returned to acting, performing in two films, Kamal Ahmed's Laugh Killer Laugh (co-starring his wife, Bianca Hunter) and Damien Leone's Frankenstein vs. The Mummy.

MacNaughton is married to actress Bianca Hunter.

== Filmography ==
Film
Year	Title	Role	Notes
1982	E.T. the Extra-Terrestrial	Michael Taylor	
1983	I Am the Cheese	Adam Farmer	
2015	Frankenstein vs. The Mummy	Isaac	
2015	Laugh Killer Laugh	Creative writing teacher	

Television
Year	Title	Role	Notes
1980	Angel City	Bennie Teeter	Television film
1981	Big Bend Country	Dave McGregor	Television film
1982	The Electric Grandmother	Tom	Television film
1984	CBS Schoolbreak Special	Craig Parsons	Television series, episode Hear Me Cry
1987	A Place to Call Home	Michael	Television film
1987	Screen Two	Clayton	Television series, episode Visitors
1987	Newhart	Andy	Television series, episode Here's to You, Mrs Loudon
1987	Amen	Michael	Television series, episode Deacon on the Line
1988	Vietnam War Story	Wagoner	Television series, episode The Fragging

== Accolades ==
Awards and nominations for acting
Year	Association	Category	Nominated work	Result
1983	Young Artist Award	Best Young Supporting Actor in a Motion Picture	E.T. the Extra-Terrestrial	Won
