= Frankenstein vs. The Mummy =

2015 film by Damien Leone

- Official release poster
- Directed by: Damien Leone
- Written by: Damien Leone
- Produced by: Jesse Baget; Neal Seidman
- Starring: Ashton Leigh; Max Rhyser; Brandon deSpain; Constantin Tripes
- Cinematography: George Steuber
- Edited by: Damien Leone
- Music by: Paul Wiley
- Distributed by: Image Entertainment
- Release date: February 10, 2015
- Running time: 115 minutes
- Country: United States
- Language: English

Frankenstein vs. The Mummy is a 2015 horror film written and directed by Damien Leone. It is the first on-screen confrontation between the mummy and Frankenstein's monster. It was released on DVD and digital download.

== Plot ==
Dr. Victor Frankenstein is a professor of medicine at an American college. After teaching his students during the morning, he does experiments on stitched together corpses at night. Frankenstein is in a relationship with Naihla Khalil, who also teaches at the same college. Khalil brought an Egyptian mummy back with her from her trip to Egypt. Victor manages to bring his creation to life and the mummy is reanimated at the same time. The two monsters eventually clash.

== Cast ==
- Ashton Leigh as Naihla Khalil
- Max Rhyser as Victor Frankenstein
- Constantin Tripes as the creature
- Brandon deSpain as the mummy
- Boomer Tibbs as professor Walton

== Production ==
Leone was inspired by the Frankenstein comic book by Bernie Wrightson and the monster's muscular build in the film was similar to that of the comic. The director stated that people were taken aback by the monster's long hair in the film, but he said that was how he interpreted a passage of the novel which "says that he’s got black locks of hair". He also intended Frankenstein's monster to resemble a zombie with rotting flesh. Leone could not use the design from the 1931 Frankenstein film because the copyright is owned by Universal Studios. Leone wanted to make the film be as serious as possible instead of campy films like Freddy vs Jason.

The film is the first on-screen confrontation between The Mummy and Frankenstein's monster. The makeup effects were completed by Leone. Michael Juvinall of Horror Society wrote, "The mummy looks how the failed 1999 Universal Stephen Sommers' Mummy reboot creature should have looked if it wasn’t a crappy CGI monster."

== Release ==
The film was released on DVD and digital download on February 10, 2015, by Image Entertainment. The special feature on the DVD is a commentary from the director.

== Reception ==
Jake Dee of JoBlo.com concluded his mixed review with, "Even if I wasn't too keen on the visual aesthetic of Frankenstein's creation, or the drawn-out runtime due to maudlin romance, I found the hyper-violence and inevitable monster showdown (even if it took forever to get there) entertaining enough."

JM Willis of Shock Ya! gave the film a C−, stating, "I did find it fun even though it was kind of awful. I have a feeling it will gain a cult fanbase and possible spinoff film."

== See also ==
- List of films featuring Frankenstein's monster
