= Ee Aye Addio =

British football chant

Ee Aye Addio is a traditional British celebratory football crowd song.

The usual format is "We've won the cup, we've won the cup, ee aye addio, we've won the cup".

Variations are often made up on the spur of the moment.

The song perhaps first gained a wider audience at the 1965 FA Cup final at Wembley Stadium, when the singing by supporters of Liverpool F.C. was broadcast on TV and radio. Noticing the Queen had a red jacket on (Liverpool's team colours), the words were hastily changed to "Ee aye addio, the Queen's wearing red!". The song was also sung after England won the 1966 FIFA World Cup.

The origin of the song lies in the traditional British nursery rhyme “The Farmer's in his Den”.
