= Other Voices (2000 film) =

- Directed by: Dan McCormack
- Written by: Dan McCormack
- Produced by: Ruth Charney; Shelly Strong
- Starring: David Aaron Baker; Peter Gallagher; Mary McCormack; Rob Morrow; Campbell Scott
- Cinematography: Dan Gillham
- Edited by: Martin Hunter; Frederick Wardell
- Music by: William T. Stromberg
- Release date: January 22, 2000 (Sundance)
- Running time: 104 minutes
- Country: United States
- Language: English

Other Voices is a 2000 American thriller film written and directed by Dan McCormack and starring David Aaron Baker, Peter Gallagher, Mary McCormack, Rob Morrow and Campbell Scott. It is McCormack’s directional debut.

At the 16th Independent Spirit Awards, Dan McCormack was nominated for the Someone to Watch Award for his work in the film.

== Cast ==
- Mary McCormack as Anna
- David Aaron Baker as Phil
- Campbell Scott as John
- Rob Morrow as Jeff
- Stockard Channing as Dr. Grover
- Peter Gallagher as Jordin
- Ricky Aiello as Mink
