= The Chocolate War =

1974 young adult novel by Robert Cormier

- First edition
- Author: Robert Cormier
- Language: English
- Genre: Young-adult novel
- Publisher: Pantheon Books
- Publication date: 1974
- Publication place: United States
- Media type: Print (hardback & paperback)
- Pages: 272 pp
- ISBN: 0-394-82805-4
- OCLC: 722968
- LC Class: PZ7.C81634 Ch
- Followed by: Beyond the Chocolate War

The Chocolate War is a 1974 young adult novel by American writer Robert Cormier. It was adapted into a film in 1988. Although it received mixed reviews at the time of its publication, some reviewers have argued it is one of the best young adult novels of all time. Set at a fictional Catholic high school, the story depicts a secret student organization's manipulation of the student body, which descends into cruel and ugly mob mentality against a lone, non-conforming student. Because of the novel's language, the concept of a high-school secret society using intimidation to enforce the cultural norms of the school, and various characters' sexual ponderings, it has been embroiled in censorship controversies and appeared as third on the American Library Association's list of the Top 100 Banned/Challenged Books in 2000–2009. A sequel was published in 1985 called Beyond the Chocolate War.

== Plot ==
Jerry is a freshman attending an all-boys Catholic high school called Trinity while coping with depressive feelings and existential questions that stem largely from his mother's recent death and his father's enduring grief. Jerry quickly is recruited onto Trinity's football team, where he meets Roland "The Goober" Goubert, a fellow freshman and instant friend.

Vice-principal Brother Leon has recently become acting headmaster and commits Trinity to selling double the previous year's amount of chocolates during an annual fundraising event, quietly enlisting the support of Archie Costello, the leader of The Vigils, the school's cruelly manipulative secret society of student pranksters.

Archie arrogantly plans to alternate between betraying and supporting Leon in a frenzied series of power plays. His first "assignment" is to incite Jerry to refuse to sell any chocolate for 10 days. However, Jerry, inspired after reading a quotation inside his locker: "Do I dare disturb the universe?" from T. S. Eliot's "The Love Song of J. Alfred Prufrock," feels strangely determined to sell nothing even after the ten days have passed, thus estranging himself from both Leon and The Vigils.

At first, Jerry's refusal to cooperate with the corrupt school culture and fundraiser is seen by many classmates as heroic, but the gesture threatens Brother Leon and The Vigils' ability to coerce the student population. Leon presses Archie to put The Vigils' full force behind the chocolate sales, so they set up Jerry as an enemy for the rest of the student body to harass through bullying, prank calls, and vandalism. Only The Goober remains Jerry's friend but does little to protect him. Ultimately, Archie enlists the school bully Emile Janza to beat up Jerry just outside the school, but, even in the aftermath, Jerry maintains his defiant nonconformity.

Finally, Archie concocts a showdown: a boxing match at night between Jerry and Emile. On the football field, the match is watched by all students, who can select which blows will be laid during the fight through a randomized lottery system; however, the fight ends when a teacher shuts down the electrical power on the field, and Jerry is brutally injured in the ensuing darkness. Half-conscious, he tells The Goober that there was no way to win and he should have just complied, conceding that it is best, after all, not to "disturb the universe." Though Archie is apprehended as the mastermind of the fight, Brother Leon intervenes on his behalf and privately praises his efforts in the unprecedented success of the chocolate sales. Leon implies that next year, if he is officially made the new headmaster, he will work to preserve Archie's power.

== Critical reception ==
The book was well-received by critics. Theodore Weesner wrote in The New York Times "The Chocolate War is masterfully structured and rich in theme; the action is well crafted, well timed, suspenseful; complex ideas develop and unfold with clarity."

Children's Book Review Service wrote "Robert Cormier has written a brilliant novel."

Cormier explained in an interview that he was "interested in creating real people, dramatic situations that will keep the reader turning pages." He went on to say that although some adults dislike the book because of the topics discussed, "the kids can absorb my kind of book because they know this kind of thing happens in life."

The New York Times Book Review declared "Mr. Cormier is almost unique in his powerful integration of the personal, political and moral" and The Australian wrote that young readers "recognised his vision as authentic and admired his willingness to tell things as they are". However, the book has been banned from many schools and it was one of the more challenged books of 2006, for its sexual content, strong language, and violence.

Reviewers compared the book to A Separate Peace and Lord of the Flies.

== Reception ==
=== Awards ===
The Chocolate War has received the following accolades:

- 1974 School Library Journal Best Books of the Year
- 1974 ALA Best Books for Young Adults
- 1974 New York Times Notable Books of the Year
- 1979 Lewis Carroll Shelf Award
- 1991 Margaret A. Edwards Award

=== Challenges ===
According to the American Library Association, The Chocolate War has frequently been banned and challenged in the United States over concerns about the book's sexual content, offensive language, religious viewpoint and violence. The book landed on the list of the top ten most banned and challenged books in 2001 (3), 2002 (3), 2004 (1), 2005 (4), 2006 (10), 2007 (2), and 2009 (10). as well as the top 100 books from 2000 to 2009 (3). When the book reached the number one spot in 2004, it marked the first time in five years in which the Harry Potter series did not top the list.

== Film adaptation ==
The Chocolate War inspired the 1988 film of the same name, directed by Keith Gordon. It starred John Glover, Wallace Langham, Ilan Mitchell-Smith, Jenny Wright, Adam Baldwin, and Corey Gunnestad.
