= The Bumblebee Flies Anyway (novel) =

1983 novel by Robert Cormier

- First edition
- Author: Robert Cormier
- Language: English
- Genre: Young adult literature
- Publisher: Pantheon Books
- Publication date: 1983
- Publication place: United States
- Pages: 241
- ISBN: 0-394-96120-X

The Bumblebee Flies Anyway is a young adult novel by Robert Cormier. It was published in 1983.

== Plot synopsis ==
The novel's main character is Barney Snow. Snow is an American resident of "the Complex", an experimental facility where drugs are tested on children and teens with terminal illnesses. He questions why he is there and what is being done to him, but also uncovers a terrible secret about himself. Later, he starts to devise a plan that will take him and the people around him on one last glorious ride.

== Awards and nominations ==
- 1985 Colorado Blue Spruce Young Adult Book Award (Nominee)

== Film adaptation ==
In 1999, a film adaptation of the novel was released. The film starred Elijah Wood and was directed by Martin Duffy.
