= After the First Death =

1979 novel by Robert Cormier

- First edition
- Author: Robert Cormier
- Language: English
- Genre: Young Adult Psychological Thriller
- Publisher: Pantheon Books
- Publication date: 1979
- Publication place: United States
- Media type: Print
- Pages: 233
- ISBN: 0-440-20835-1

After the First Death is a 1979 suspense novel for young adults by American author Robert Cormier. The focus is on the complex relationships that develop between the various characters. The novel takes the name from the poem, "A Refusal to Mourn the Death, by Fire, of a Child in London" by Dylan Thomas. It originates from the last line: "After the first death, there is no other."

== Synopsis ==
After the First Death describes the terrorist hijacking of a summer camp bus full of children. The main characters include Kate, a high school student driving the bus, Miro, one of the terrorists, and Ben, the son of a general holding a senior position in "Inner Delta"; a government anti-terrorism organization. The story is mostly written from the point-of-view of Kate, Miro, and Ben, switching back and forth. Brief sections are told from the perspective of other characters.

== Plot ==
Odd Chapters

The first narrator, Ben Marchand, is a teenager who is the son of a general commanding an anti-terrorism unit. At the commencement of the novel, he is waiting in his room at Castle, his boarding school, for his mother and father to arrive. Reference is made to his having been shot in an incident on a bridge, and his mother occasionally refers to him as "Mark". The incident on the bridge is the event explored in the even-numbered chapters.

The perspective switches from Ben to his father, General Mark Marchand, who left his son's room after a brief conversation and came back to find it empty. The general reflects on how he volunteered Ben to deliver a message to the terrorists on the bus. Ben is subsequently wounded and much later, believing himself a coward, commits suicide from another bridge - after the first "death" of the title.

The last odd-numbered chapter consists of apparent conversations between Ben and his father, which reveal that the boy is already dead. The general attempts to call back Ben in order to ask for forgiveness for making use of his sensitive son's perceived vulnerability when used as a go-between with the terrorists. They are not actually in Castle but in a mental hospital where the general, broken by guilt, is now apparently a patient.

Even Chapters

Miro is a terrorist from a foreign country who is also a teenager. He and three other terrorists, Artkin, Antibbe, and Stroll hijack a bus full of preschoolers on a trip to school camp. Miro is assigned to kill the driver of the bus, unexpectedly a teenage girl substituting for her uncle.

Artkin starts handing candies laced with sedatives to the children, knocking them unconscious. One child is killed by the drugs, most likely of an overdose or heart condition. Because of this, Artkin orders Miro not to kill the bus driver right away so that she can calm the children on the bus.

The bus arrives at the bridge. Miro explains to the driver, Kate, that he participated in the hijacking in the belief that this would assist in freeing his homeland. Kate, stunned by the savagery shown when one of the terrorists dances holding the dead child above his head, is determined to escape. She prepares to make use of Raymond, a child who has not taken the candy, and of the keys to the bus.

Kate attempts to drive the bus away from the bridge but the engine suddenly stalls. Its occupants are forced to spend the night on the bridge, now surrounded by police and troops.

The next morning, it is reported that ransom payments are commencing. However, the terrorists still demand evidence of the capture of Sedeete, the leader of their group.

A few minutes afterward, Antibbe is shot by a military sniper acting on reflex. The terrorists kill the boy Raymond in retaliation. Ben Marchand is sent with a stone from their homeland as proof of Sedeete's capture. Ben is briefly tortured and gives the terrorists misleading information as to the timing of a planned rescue attempt, which his father had deliberately passed to him. Soldiers attack the bus and free the surviving children. They kill Artkin, and Ben is wounded in the cross-fire.

In the confusion of the assault, Miro escapes through the military cordon, forcing Kate to accompany him. Kate tries to convince Miro that Artkin was his father. The confused Miro does not believe this and shoots Kate, believing that she had been manipulating him. The girl dies thinking that her family would not know that she had been brave. Miro moves out to kill a passing motorist and make good his escape.
