= Rob Morrow =

American actor (born 1962)

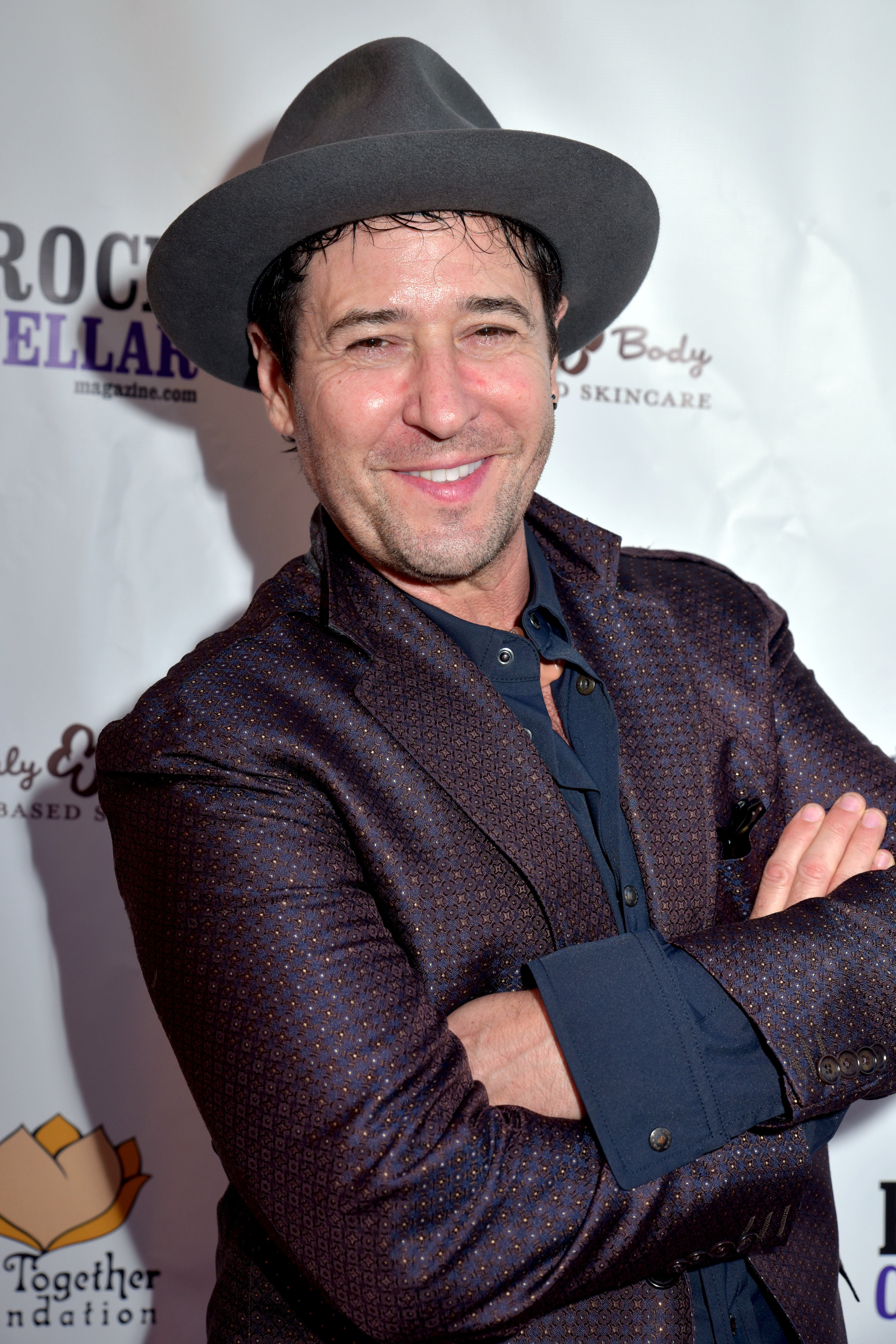
- Morrow in 2019
- Born: Robert Alan Morrow; September 21, 1962 (age 64); New Rochelle, New York, U.S.
- Occupations: Actor; director
- Years active: 1980–present
- Spouse: Debbon Ayer (m. 1998)
- Children: 1
- Website: robmorrow.com

Robert Alan Morrow (born September 21, 1962) is an American actor. He is known for his portrayal of Dr. Joel Fleischman on Northern Exposure, a role that garnered him three Golden Globe and two Emmy nominations for Best Actor in a Dramatic Series, and later for his role as FBI agent Don Eppes on Numb3rs.

== Early life ==
Morrow was born in New Rochelle, New York, the son of Murray Morrow, an industrial lighting manufacturer, and Diane Francis (née Markowitz), a dental hygienist. He is Jewish, and had a Reform Bar Mitzvah. Morrow grew up in Hartsdale, New York. His parents divorced when he was nine years old. He attended Cardigan Mountain School and Edgemont High School and quit school at the beginning of his senior year to begin his acting career.

== Career ==
Early in his acting career, Morrow appeared as an extra on Saturday Night Live; about 12 years later, he returned to host the show with the band Nirvana as musical guest. He co-starred alongside Johnny Depp in Private Resort (1985). He later appeared in the Dentyne gum commercials where he would slyly utter the "Time to walk the dog" catch phrase.

Morrow played the lead role in the television show Northern Exposure from 1990 to 1995. Morrow's character, Joel Fleischman, is "a New York City physician who is surprised to be assigned to the isolated and icy town of Cicely, Alaska". For his work on Northern Exposure, Morrow was nominated for three Golden Globe Awards and two Emmy Awards. In 1992, Morrow had demanded a pay increase from $30,000 to $60,000 and was sued by Universal Television after he refused to show up on set in protest. He left the CBS comedy-drama in 1994 after a contract dispute.

Morrow starred in the critically acclaimed film Quiz Show (1994) as Dick Goodwin, a congressional investigator intent on uncovering the corruption behind the 1950s game show scandal. Morrow played the younger brother of Albert Brooks' character in Mother (1996). In 2000, he directed and starred in Maze, about an artist with Tourette syndrome.

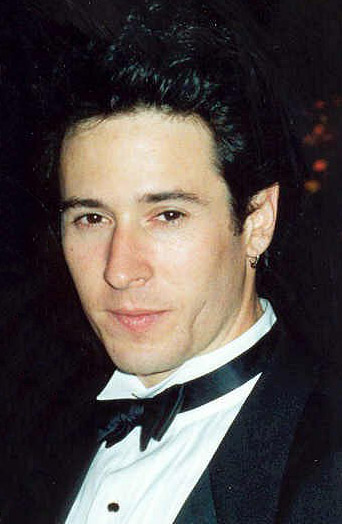
Morrow in 1991

In 2002, Morrow played Kevin Hunter on the Showtime television series Street Time. He also appeared in the television film Custody. In 2007, he played Jack Nicholson's doctor, Dr. Hollins, in The Bucket List. From 2005 to 2010, he starred with David Krumholtz and Judd Hirsch as FBI agent Don Eppes in Numb3rs on CBS. On March 8, 2010, it was announced that Morrow had signed on to star in Jerry Bruckheimer's new series, The Whole Truth, on ABC. The series aired on September 13, 2010, but was pulled from the ABC schedule in December. Morrow filmed 13 episodes. Morrow starred as Henry Rearden in Atlas Shrugged: Part III, which was released September 12, 2014. In 2017, Morrow starred in the recurring role of reporter Abe Leonard in the first season of the ABC political drama Designated Survivor. He also starred in The People v. O. J. Simpson: American Crime Story as Barry Scheck. As of November 2018, news was released that a revival of Northern Exposure was in the works at CBS and that Morrow would return as Joel Fleischman.

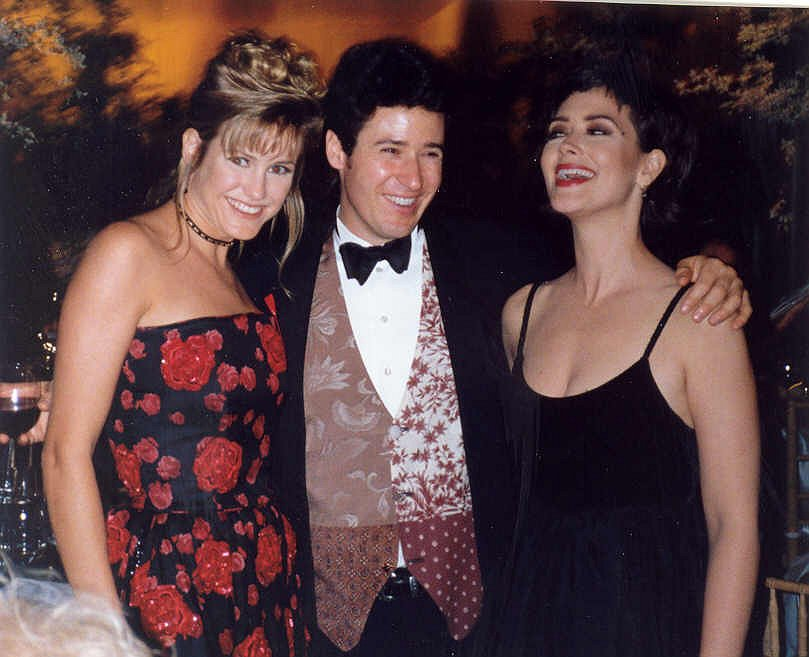
Cynthia Geary, Rob Morrow and Janine Turner at the 45th Primetime Emmy Awards Governor's Ball, September 1993

Morrow had a recurring role on the Showtime drama Billions as judge Adam DeGiulio.

Morrow is a teacher at the Ruskin Group Theatre in Santa Monica. During the summer of 2019, he starred as Willy Loman in the theater's production of Death of a Salesman.

In the 2026 Civil War television mini-series, The Gray House, Morrow portrayed Judah Benjamin, who was in Jefferson Davis's cabinet. Benjamin was conflicted as the only Jewish person in elite Confederate leadership.

== Personal life ==
On his 36th birthday in 1998, Morrow married actress Debbon Ayer. They have one daughter, Tu Morrow born in 2001. They live in Santa Monica, California. Morrow previously lived in Seattle at the time of filming Northern Exposure.

== Acting credits ==
=== Film ===
| Year | Title | Role | Notes |
|---|---|---|---|
| 1985 | Private Resort | Ben | |
| 1994 | Quiz Show | Dick Goodwin | |
| 1996 | Last Dance | Rick Hayes | |
| 1996 | Mother | Jeff Henderson | |
| 1998 | Into My Heart | Ben | |
| 2000 | Other Voices | Jeff | |
| 2000 | Maze | Lyle Maze | |
| 2000 | Labor Pains | Ryan Keene | |
| 2001 | Sam the Man | Daniel Lenz | |
| 2002 | The Guru | Josh Goldstein | |
| 2002 | The Emperor's Club | James Ellerby | |
| 2002 | Night's Noontime | Dr. William Minor | Short film |
| 2005 | Going Shopping | Miles | |
| 2007 | The Bucket List | Dr. Hollins | |
| 2011 | The Good Doctor | Dr. Waylans | |
| 2011 | Interception | Matthew | Short film |
| 2013 | Begin Again | CEO | |
| 2014 | Atlas Shrugged: Part III | Henry Rearden | |
| 2015 | Lost Soul | Himself | Documentary |
| 2015 | Little Loopers | Big Earl Boyd | |
| 2015 | Night of the Wild | Dave | |
| 2019 | The Kill Team | William Briggman | |

=== Television ===
| Year | Title | Role | Notes |
|---|---|---|---|
| 1980 | Saturday Night Live | Juror | Episode: "Rodney Dangerfield/The J. Geils Band" |
| 1985 | Fame | Joey Laurenzano | Episode: "The Ol' Ball Game" |
| 1987 | Spenser: For Hire | Danny | Episode: "Murder and Acquisitions" |
| 1987 | Everything's Relative | Eddie Dayton | Episode: "The Mom Who Came to Dinner" |
| 1989 | Tattingers | Marco Bellini | TV series Lasted one season |
| 1989 | Monsters | Vito | Episode: "La Strega" |
| 1990–95 | Northern Exposure | Dr. Joel Fleischman | 102 episodes Nominated – Golden Globe Award for Best Actor – Television Series Drama (1992–94); Primetime Emmy Award for Outstanding Lead Actor in a Drama Series (1992–93); Screen Actors Guild Award for Outstanding Performance by an Ensemble in a Comedy Series |
| 1992 | Saturday Night Live | Host | Episode: "Rob Morrow/Nirvana" |
| 1992 | The Ben Stiller Show | Himself | Episode: "With Rob Morrow" |
| 1998 | The Day Lincoln Was Shot | John Wilkes Booth | TV movie |
| 1998 | Only Love | Matthew Heller | TV movie |
| 2000 | The Thin Blue Lie | Jonathan Neumann | TV movie |
| 2001 | Hudson's Law | Unknown | TV movie |
| 2001 | Jenifer | Dr. Richard Feldman | TV movie |
| 2002–03 | Street Time | Kevin Hunter | 33 episodes |
| 2005–10 | Numb3rs | Don Eppes | 118 episodes |
| 2007 | Custody | David Gordon | TV movie |
| 2009 | The Grean Team | Robbie Blackman | TV movie |
| 2010–11 | Entourage | Jim Lefkowitz | 4 episodes |
| 2010 | The Whole Truth | Jimmy Brogan | 13 episodes |
| 2012 | CSI: NY | Leonard Brooks | 2 episodes |
| 2012, 2014 | Phineas and Ferb | Flea Market Salesman / Bernie (voices) | 2 episodes |
| 2014 | Debbie Macomber's Mr. Miracle | Harry Mills | TV movie |
| 2015 | Law & Order: Special Victims Unit | Skip Peterson | Episode: "Devastating Story" |
| 2015 | Texas Rising | Colonel James Fannin | 4 episodes |
| 2015 | Inside Amy Schumer | John | Episode: "Wingwoman" |
| 2015 | Sex & Drugs & Rock & Roll | J.P. | Episode: "Because We're Legion" |
| 2016–17 | The Fosters | Will | 4 episodes |
| 2016 | The People v. O. J. Simpson: American Crime Story | Barry Scheck | 6 episodes |
| 2016–23 | Billions | Judge Adam DeGiulio | 18 episodes |
| 2017 | Hell's Kitchen | Himself | Episode: "Leaving It on the Line" |
| 2017 | Designated Survivor | Abe Leonard | 5 episodes |
| 2017 | Milo Murphy's Law | Mr. Brulee (voice) | Episode: "Family Vacation" |
| 2017 | Flint | Professor Edwards | Movie |
| 2018 | Chicago P.D. | Evan Gilchrist | Episode: "Bad Boys" |
| 2019 | Hawaii Five-0 | Wes Cullen | 2 episodes |
| 2021 | Curb Your Enthusiasm | Hal Berman | Episode: "IRASSHAIMASE!" |
| 2022 | Super Pumped | Eddy Cue | 2 episodes |
| 2022 | Shining Vale | Thom | 2 episodes |
| 2024 | The Edge of Sleep | Dr. Castaneda | 3 episodes |
| 2025 | Murdaugh: Death in the Family | Prosecutor Waters | 2 episodes |
| 2026 | The Gray House | Judah Benjamin | 8 episodes |

== Directing credits ==
| Year | Title | Notes |
|---|---|---|
| 1993 | The Silent Alarm | Short film |
| 2000 | Maze | Also producer and writer |
| 2002 | Oz | Episode: "Laws of Gravity" |
| 2003 | Street Time | 3 episodes |
| 2004 | Joan of Arcadia | 3 episodes |
| 2006–10 | Numbers | 3 episodes |
| 2012–13 | Necessary Roughness | 2 episodes |
| 2015–17 | The Fosters | 6 episodes |
| 2016 | NCIS: New Orleans | Episode: "Man on Fire" |
| 2019 | Games People Play | 2 episodes |
