= Robert Cormier =

American writer and journalist (1925–2000)

Robert Edmund Cormier
- Born: January 17, 1925; Leominster, Massachusetts, US
- Died: November 2, 2000 (aged 75); Boston, Massachusetts, US
- Occupation: Writer
- Spouse: Constance Senay
- Children: 4
- Writing career
- Period: 1962–2000
- Genres: Realist young adult (YA) novels, crime fiction, thrillers
- Notable awards: Margaret A. Edwards Award; 1991; Phoenix Award; 1997

Robert Edmund Cormier (January 17, 1925 – November 2, 2000) was an American writer and journalist, known for his deeply pessimistic novels, many of which were written for young adults. Recurring themes include abuse, mental illness, violence, revenge, betrayal, and conspiracy. In most of his novels, the protagonists do not win.

Cormier's more popular works include I Am the Cheese, After the First Death, We All Fall Down, and The Chocolate War, all of which have won awards. The Chocolate War has been challenged in multiple libraries.

== Early life and education ==
Robert Cormier was born in 1925 in Leominster, Massachusetts in the French-Canadian section of the town called French Hill. He was the second of eight children. His family moved frequently to afford rent, but never left his hometown. Even when he was much older and owned a summer home, it was only 19 mi (31 km) away from Leominster. In a few of his books, Cormier's hometown of Leominster became the fictional town of Monument, and its village of French Hill became Frenchtown. The nearby city of Fitchburg, Massachusetts became Wickburg.

Cormier attended St. Cecilia's Parochial School, a private Catholic school. He began writing when he was in the first grade and was praised at school for his poetry. He first realized his aspiration to become a writer in 7th grade, when he was encouraged by a nun to write a poem. He attended Leominster High School, graduating as the president of his class.

As a freshman at Fitchburg State College, Cormier had his first short story published when a college professor, Florence Conlon, without his knowledge, sent one of his stories to a national Catholic magazine The Sign for $75.

== Career ==
Cormier began his professional writing career scripting radio commercials. He quickly transitioned to newspaper journalism, working for the Worcester Telegram and Gazette and the Fitchburg Sentinel from 1946 to 1978, eventually becoming an award-winning journalist. Even though he became widely known, he never stopped writing for the Fitchburg Sentinel.

Cormier became a full-time writer after the success of his first adult novel for teenagers, Now and at the Hour (1960); others followed, such as The Chocolate War and After the First Death. He was concerned with the problems facing young people in modern society, which was reflected in his novels. He soon established a reputation as a brilliant and uncompromising writer. His awards include the Margaret A. Edwards Award of the Young Adult Services Division of the American Library Association, a lifetime award that recognizes a particular body of work that provides young adults with a window through which they can view the world, and which will help them to grow and understand themselves and their role in society. Cormier won the annual award in 1991, citing The Chocolate War; I Am the Cheese; and After the First Death.

The Chocolate War has been challenged in various libraries and schools for its language and its depictions of sexual activity, secret societies, and anarchic students. Between 1990 and 2000 it was the fourth most frequently challenged book in the US, according to the American Library Association.

== Awards ==
In 1991, The American Library Association bestowed its Margaret Edwards Award to I Am the Cheese, citing it as one of three 1974 to 1979 books "taken to heart by young adults over a period of years.” The ALA said that "Cormier's brilliantly crafted and troubling novels have achieved the status of classics in young adult literature."

I Am the Cheese won the 1997 Phoenix Award from the Children's Literature Association. Named for the mythical bird, the Phoenix Award recognizes the best English language children's book that did not win a major award when it was originally published twenty years earlier.

== Personal life ==
Cormier's son Peter was involved in a situation that was the inspiration for the plot of The Chocolate War. Robert Cormier died on November 2, 2000, due to complications from a blood clot.

== Published works ==
Non-Fiction

- I Have Words to Spend [Collected Newspaper Articles] (1991)

Fiction

Novels except as stated

- Now and at the Hour (1960)
- A Little Raw on Monday Mornings (1963)
- Take Me Where the Good Times Are (1965)
- The Chocolate War (1974)
- I Am the Cheese (1977)
- After the First Death (1979)
- 8 Plus 1 (1980), short story collection
- The Bumblebee Flies Anyway (1983)
- Beyond The Chocolate War (1985)
- Fade (1988)
- Other Bells for Us to Ring (1990); UK title, Darcy (1991)
- We All Fall Down (1991)
- Tunes for Bears to Dance To (1992)
- In the Middle of the Night (1995)
- Tenderness (1997)
- Heroes (1998)
- Frenchtown Summer (1999)
- The Rag and Bone Shop (2001)

== Film adaptations ==
- I Am the Cheese (1983), in which Cormier appears as "Mr. Hertz"
- The Chocolate War (1988)
- Lapse of Memory (1991), an adaptation of I Am the Cheese
- The Bumblebee Flies Anyway (1999)
- Tenderness (2009)
- The Assignment (2012), a student feature-film adaptation of The Chocolate War
