= Future Shock (FlashForward) =

- FlashForward episode
- Episode no.: Season 1 Episode 22
- Directed by: John Polson
- Written by: Timothy J. Lea & Scott M. Gimple
- Production code: 122
- Original air date: May 27, 2010

Guest appearances
- Patrick J. Adams as Ed; Hiro Ambrosino as Yuuka Arahida; Carlease Burke as Francine; Genevieve Cortese as Tracy Stark; Annabeth Gish as Lita; Barry Shabaka Henley as Shelly Vreede; Neil Jackson as Lucas Hellinger; Marquessa Moreland as Dr. Sarah Long; Lindsay Pulsipher as Older Charlie Benford; Dominic Rains as Kahmir Dejan; Blake Robbins as Buckner; Yūko Takeuchi as Keiko Arahida; Lennon Wynn as Charlie Benford; Ryan Wynott as Dylan Simcoe; Michael Ealy as Marshall Vogel

Episode chronology
← Previous "Countdown"	Next → —

"Future Shock" is the 22nd episode and series finale of the ABC series FlashForward, originally aired May 27, 2010. Directed by John Polson and written by Timothy J. Lea and Scott M. Gimple, the episode received positive reviews.

== Plot ==
Olivia (Sonya Walger) and Charlie (Lennon Wynn) are at the beach, deciding to avoid whatever future was in store for them; Lloyd (Jack Davenport) meets her there and urges her to return home. She agrees, and Lloyd and Olivia are surprised when Dylan (Ryan Wynott) writes the equation in lipstick on the mirror.

Demetri (John Cho), Janis (Christine Woods), and Simon (Dominic Monaghan) head to NLAP to try to stop the next blackout from occurring, as well as discover who is behind it all. Demetri is worried, as in Janis’ flashforward she had been receiving a sonogram, and Janis begins to have cramps. Janis creates a diversion for security, allowing Demetri and Simon to enter NLAP undetected. Simon copies the contents of the computer to a flash drive. At the hospital, Janis has her sonogram just as she saw in her flashforward, but this time the baby is a boy instead of a girl.

In Afghanistan, Aaron (Brían F. O'Byrne) sobs over Tracy’s (Genevieve Cortese) death, but Kahmir (Dominic Rains) revives Tracy, recreating what Aaron had seen in his flashforward.

Bryce (Zachary Knighton) finds Keiko (Yūko Takeuchi) has already left when he arrives at the detention center, and he heads to the sushi restaurant to wait for her. Bryce apologizes to Nicole (Peyton List), telling her he loves Keiko, and Nicole apologizes for keeping the truth from him. At the airport, Keiko’s mother creates a diversion to allow Keiko to leave. She meets Bryce at the sushi restaurant, and the two smile as they see their flashforwards coming true. Meanwhile, Nicole is driving and veers off the road into a lake. She is rescued by a passerby; Nicole realizes what she had seen in her flashforward was the man trying to save her and not drown her. Her rescuer, Ed (Patrick J. Adams), confirms this with his own flashforward.

Stan (Courtney B. Vance) has Mark (Joseph Fiennes) released from jail and has him talk to Aaron on the phone to calm him down. Mark discovers the FBI building is being evacuated due to bombs found in the building. Mark wishes to head to his mosaic board as he had seen in his flashforward; Vogel (Michael Ealy) informs him of his own flashforward, that he had been telling another agent about Mark’s death, but Mark decides to go in anyway. After being led outside in custody, Hellinger (Neil Jackson) nods to some men in bomb squad gear who are working for him. The men don masks and proceed into the building. Stan also heads inside to rescue Mark. At NLAP, Simon sends Lloyd a text to help him crack the equation. Lloyd contacts Mark, telling him the equation yielded an interval indicating that the next blackout will occur within the next two days.

Mark notices Gabriel’s (James Callis) drawing of his mosaic board and changes his own to match it. He uses the clues on his board to determine that the next blackout is to occur at 10:14 p.m. on April 29, minutes away. The masked men enter the office. Mark ambushes several of them, then contacts Stan to warn the White House. Vogel tells another agent about Mark’s inevitable death outside Olivia’s house, although this time it is Olivia who witnesses this and not Charlie. At NLAP, Simon and Demetri find that the system has been taken over by someone from the outside and realize another blackout is about to occur; Simon offers Demetri his QED ring, but Demetri decides to witness his flashforward this time as he never did before. Mark notices a timer on one of the bombs and races for his office. He collapses before he gets there, however, as the second global blackout occurs. Due to the slight warning, people are better prepared. Lita, wearing a QED ring, wheels an unconscious Janis out of the hospital. A montage of flashforward images is shown, some with dates indicating the flashforward may take place several years in the future. The montage ends with an older Charlie saying to someone off-screen, “They found him!” before the present Charlie awakens, along with Olivia, Lloyd, and Dylan. The FBI building is then shown exploding, possibly with Mark still inside.

== Title sequence image ==
Charlie Benford's eyes as she wakes up from her flash forward during the second global blackout.

== Production ==
The series was cancelled on May 14, 2010. However, the promo that aired on May 20, 2010 stated that this was the season finale. The finale was originally set to be two hours long, consisting of both this episode and "Countdown". After cancellation, they were aired separately. John Polson directed this episode, his third directing credit for the season. Timothy J. Lea and Scott M. Gimple wrote the episode. This is Lea's second writing credit for the show. He wrote the episode "Queen Sacrifice" with Byron Balasco.

== Reception ==
4.96 million Americans watched the series finale with a 1.4 rating among adults 18-49. 1.5 million British viewers watched the finale.

MTV stated "looking at it as a season finale made the episode fall short." Zap2it stated "things could have gone better, but overall not unhappy." IGN gave the episode an 8.1 rating out of 10, stating "no one can accuse it of going out with a whimper." The A.V. Club gave the finale a B− with mixed reviews, calling it "irresistible," but also said "wouldn't miss the show." Zap2it declared FlashForward the "most missed axed show" after a poll determined 46.3 percent of voters would miss it. The second place show was Ghost Whisperer.
