= The Negotiation (FlashForward) =

- FlashForward episode
- Episode no.: Season 1 Episode 20
- Directed by: Leslie Libman
- Written by: Teleplay by: Byron Balasco & Quinton Peeples; Story by: Debbie Ezer
- Production code: 120
- Original air date: May 13, 2010

Guest appearances
- Gil Bellows as Timothy Cooke; James Callis as Gabriel McDow; Genevieve Cortese as Tracy Stark; Peter Coyote as Dave Segovia; Lee Garlington as Carline; Annabeth Gish as Lita; Barry Shabaka Henley as Shelly Vreede; Neil Jackson as Lucas Hellinger; Dominic Rains as Kahmir Dejan; Michael Ealy as Marshall Vogel; Gabrielle Union as Zoey Andata; Dominic Bogart as Keith Connor

Episode chronology
← Previous "Course Correction"	Next → "Countdown"

"The Negotiation" is the 20th episode of the ABC series FlashForward.

== Synopsis ==
On the day before the blackout, Mark (Joseph Fiennes) does everything he can to protect Gabriel (James Callis). Janis (Christine Woods) is ordered to kill Mark, but doesn't know if she can go along with this. Also, Aaron's (Brían F. O'Byrne) life is in danger when he gets closer to finding his daughter.

== Title sequence image ==
A metal flask (which actually does not appear in the episode).

== Reception ==
This episode was watched by 4.84 million American viewers with an 18–49 rating of 1.3. This episode received a 7.6 rating out of 10 by IGN. The A.V. Club gave the episode a D. Television Without Pity gave this episode a B−.
