= Countdown (FlashForward) =

- FlashForward episode
- Episode no.: Season 1 Episode 21
- Directed by: John Polson
- Written by: Lisa Zwerling & Seth Hoffman
- Production code: 121
- Original air date: May 20, 2010

Guest appearances
- Hira Ambrosino as Yuuka Arahida; Dominic Bogart as Keith Connor; Carlease Burke as Francine; Genevieve Cortese as Tracy Stark; Neil Jackson as Lucas Hellinger; Jake Johnson as Powell; Dominic Rains as Kahmir Dejan; Yūko Takeuchi as Keiko Arahida; Lennon Wynn as Charlie Benford; Ryan Wynott as Dylan Simcoe; Michael Ealy as Marshall Vogel; Gabrielle Union as Zoey Andata

Episode chronology
← Previous "The Negotiation"	Next → "Future Shock"

"Countdown" is the 21st episode of the ABC series FlashForward.

== Plot ==
It's the day of the flashforwards, and the world is waiting for their visions to come true.

Mark (Joseph Fiennes) continues his questioning of Lucas Hellinger (Neil Jackson) in an attempt to find out when the next flashforward will occur. All Lucas tells him is that he will die at the end of the day, also stating that his daughter (Lennon Wynn) will be better off if that happens. Mark then beats Lucas, and is dragged out of the building.

Demetri (John Cho) must decide whether or not to turn Simon (Dominic Monaghan) in after finding him and Janis (Christine Woods) on their way to NLAP. Demetri arrests Simon and puts him in the back of his truck. After some thought, Demetri decides to accompany Simon and Janis to NLAP instead of arresting Simon.

Lloyd (Jack Davenport) solves the complex equation he was working on in his flashforward with the help of his son (Ryan Wynott). Lloyd then phones Olivia (Sonya Walger) and tells her to come to the house. However, Olivia tells Lloyd she's taking Charlie to an unknown location, leaving Lloyd confused.

Tracy (Genevieve Cortese) fights for her life, and Aaron (Brían F. O'Byrne) finds out why Jericho is after her. He gets answers from one of the Jericho soldiers, saying that they were experimenting for the flashforwards, and were hunting Tracy down because she was the only civilian awake during the experiment. Tracy then dies from her severe wounds.

Nicole (Peyton List) wonders if she should tell Bryce (Zachary Knighton) where Keiko (Yūko Takeuchi) is. She then decides to tell Bryce because she worries if not doing so will result in her death, which she saw in her vision. Nicole tells Bryce that Keiko is in holding. Keiko is later released and taken with her mother. Bryce goes to get Keiko later, but is too late.

It's 7pm, three hours before the flashforwards are supposed to occur. Mark is handed a flask during a party. He drinks from it, then goes to a bar, giving in to his temptations. He then gets into a bar fight, putting him in jail.

The episode ends with everyone wondering if the events that happened will change their flashforwards.

== Title sequence image ==
The April 29, 2010 calendar page from the first episode.

== Production ==
The finale was originally set to be two hours long, consisting of both this episode and "Future Shock". After cancellation, they were aired separately. John Polson directed this episode and the finale.

== Reception ==
This episode was watched by approximately 5.26 million American viewers, a rise from last week's episode, with 4.8 million. Emily VanDerWerff of The A.V. Club gave this episode a C, stating "I actually rather liked Mark in this episode, which is a big step for the show, as it's always had trouble getting anyone invested in its main character." IGN gave this episode a 7.7 rating, commenting "some of it works and some of it doesn't." TV Squad said "This is the kind of episode that makes you even more disappointed that this is the end of the road for 'FlashForward.'" Zap2it called it "an interesting psychological study."
