= No More Good Days =

- FlashForward episode
- Los Angeles after the blackout, with Mark Benford standing on top of a broken car
- Episode no.: Season 1 Episode 1
- Directed by: David S. Goyer
- Written by: David S. Goyer; Brannon Braga
- Original air date: September 24, 2009

Guest appearances
- Lee Thompson Young as Al Gough; Barry Shabaka Henley as Agent Vreede; Lennon Wynn as Charlie Benford; Bryce Robinson as Dylan Simcoe; Genevieve Cortese as Tracy Stark; Alex Kingston as Fiona Banks; Seth MacFarlane as FBI Agent Jake Curdy; Rachel Roberts as Alda Hertzog

Episode chronology
← Previous —	Next → "White to Play"

"No More Good Days" is the series premiere of the American television series FlashForward. The episode's teleplay was written by David S. Goyer and Brannon Braga, who also conceived of the television story, based upon the novel of the same name by Robert J. Sawyer. Goyer also directed the episode, which originally aired in the United States on ABC on September 24, 2009.

The series opens on a seemingly ordinary day on October 6, 2009, that soon becomes extraordinary as everyone in Los Angeles blacks out for 2 minutes and 17 seconds. It soon becomes apparent the blackouts occurred worldwide, and were accompanied by a flash-forward where each person saw what might be his or her life on April 29, 2010, about six months in the future. FBI Agent Mark Benford and a team of agents in Los Angeles begin gathering clues as to what might have happened as they struggle to come to terms with their own visions, or lack thereof. Meanwhile, Mark's wife and daughter each have disturbing visions of the future with which they must cope. As the episode closes, FBI Agent Janis Hawk makes a startling discovery: an image from CCTV in Detroit of a man in black, walking through the stadium while everyone around him is unconscious.

== Plot overview ==
The episode opens with a car crash. Mark Benford (Joseph Fiennes) climbs out of his wrecked car and looks around him: there is devastation everywhere, people lie injured and/or dead in the road, cars and trucks are piled up and things are on fire. Mark calls out for his partner, Demetri Noh (John Cho).

In a flashback sequence, each of the leads goes about their daily lives. Olivia Benford (Sonya Walger) scrubs up at the hospital before surgery; Bryce Varley (Zachary Knighton) prepares to commit suicide by shooting himself at the beach; Aaron Stark (Brían F. O'Byrne) and Mark attend an Alcoholics Anonymous meeting; Nicole Kirby (Peyton List) sneaks a boy into the Benfords' house as she babysits their daughter Charlie (Lennon Wynn). Later, Mark and his FBI partner Demetri give chase on a freeway after getting a lead on a case. Then, the blackout occurs. Upon awakening, Bryce finds himself alive and helps to save the lives of surfers lost at sea; Olivia's patient flatlines in theatre; Aaron wakes up injured on an electricity pole; Nicole and her boyfriend are in a naked and confused state. Each of them panics and tries to get help.

Everyone slowly admits they experienced a 'vision' during the blackout: Mark was furiously working an FBI case and has resumed drinking alcohol; Olivia was with another man; Janis was 17 weeks pregnant. The Benfords' daughter Charlie tells Nicole, "I had a bad dream. I dreamt there were no more good days." World news shows that the blackout was global. Demetri starts to panic when he realises he may be the only person not to experience a flash forward - believing that he will be dead in six months.

Olivia treats an 8-year-old boy, a victim of the blackout. She tells him he will be okay, and he refers to her by name, even though she does not know him. Later, Olivia sobs and tells Mark about her blackout. Her flash forward is shown, in which she is in bed with a man she doesn't recognise. At the hospital (in the present time), that same man from Olivia's vision walks into the ward where the 8-year-old boy resides and asks to speak to Dr Benford.

At the end of the episode, Charlie gives Mark a bracelet she made for him. Mark is alarmed: the bracelet is the same one he saw in his flash forward, indicating that the visions may be coming true. Elsewhere, Janis Hawk (Christine Woods) is checking CCTV from during the blackout. She focuses on a baseball game in Detroit and notices that as everyone blacks out, one dark figure is moving across the back of the stadium.

== Title sequence image ==
Within the show's logo in this episode is a friendship bracelet in the hand of Charlie Benford when she gives it to her father, Mark.

== Production ==
=== Development ===
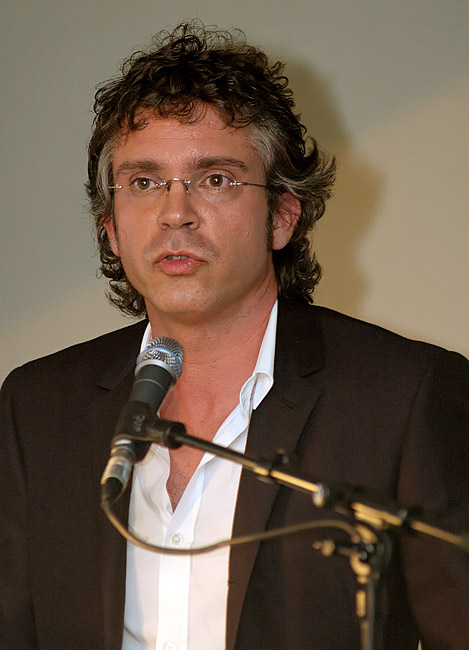
Producer Brannon Braga was the co-writer and executive producer for the first three episodes of the series.

The series was conceived by David S. Goyer and Brannon Braga, based upon the novel of the same name. The two had previously worked together on the short-lived CBS series Threshold The idea was originally pitched to HBO, a pay-cable network, however the HBO leadership felt that the series was better suited to a broadcast network. With the consent of HBO, Goyer and Braga pitched the idea to both ABC and Fox, with ABC winning the bidding war. In the early stages of development, ABC considered coupling the new show with Lost. This created a problem, as Braga was an executive producer of the Fox series 24. ABC Studios and 20th Century Fox Home Entertainment discussed co-producing FlashForward, but Braga eventually pulled out of his "day-to-day" involvement with the project.

When writing the script, one of the most "obvious" changes from the novel was altering how far into the future the characters see when they black out. from "21 years to six months", according to Marc Guggenheim. Guggenheim felt that the "real appeal" of the series is "getting to see the payoff of when the future becomes the present", and Goyer and Braga made the decision to create a first season "payoff" early in the writing process. Another difference is the characters of FBI Special Agents Mark Benford and Demetri Noh, neither of whom appears in the book. The main character in the book is Lloyd Simcoe, the scientist who created the flash-forward.

=== Casting ===
On May 8, 2009, it was announced that FlashForward was to comprise part of ABC's fall 2009 season. Prior to this, the network had aired several five second advertisements featuring plot elements and characters. Courtney B. Vance and Jack Davenport became the first officially announced cast members of FlashForward. On June 10, 2009, it was announced that Lost star Dominic Monaghan had been cast in the series although his role was then unknown. Rumors of Monaghan's casting began after an advert of him being asked by Friends actress Courteney Cox "What did you see?" was aired as part of the ABC House advertising campaign. It was not immediately revealed which TV series Monaghan would be starring in, but it was eventually announced that he was joining the cast of FlashForward. On December 5, 2008, it was reported that Fiennes and Cho had been added to the cast, followed by the announcement that Sonya Walger and Christine Woods had also been cast. Sonya, who is British, uses an American accent in the show for her part as Olivia. In an interview with Digital Spy, Walger described Olivia as the "main woman in the show". Gabrielle Union was announced to be playing the part of Zoey on July 30, 2009, and Seth MacFarlane on June 18, 2009, as FBI agent Jake Curdy.

== Broadcast and reception ==
=== Ratings and viewership ===
This episode was watched by 12.47 million American viewers, with a 7.7/13 overall household rating. This episode was watched by 4.1 million British viewers on its premiere on Five. The repeat the following Friday reached 1.28 million. The satellite repeat on Fiver attracted 601 thousand viewers. CTV bought the rights for the series in May, 2009, though it was not known at that time what channel it would air at on the CTV television network.

==== Quarter-hour ratings ====
Time	Rating	Share	Rating/Share (18–49)	Viewers (millions)
8:00pm	7.7	13	3.8/12	12.34
8:15pm	7.4	12	3.8/11	11.88
8:30pm	7.7	13	4.1/12	12.49
8:45pm	8.1	13	4.5/12	13.16

=== Critical reception ===
"Whatever the outcome, be it a solar flare, God punishing the world, or an angry Minnesota Twins fan, the interplay between fate and freewill fuels the drama more than the mystery itself. If FlashForward can keep the momentum it set in its premiere episode, the show's apocalyptic tone and fate-bending intrigue should prove deeply fascinating".

— Kris King of Slant

Reviews of the premiere were generally positive. According to Metacritic, which assigns a normalized rating out of 100 to reviews from mainstream critics, the premiere has received a "generally favorable" score of 72, based on 26 reviews. Gina Bellafante of The New York Times found the premiere to work "just as powerfully as a domestic drama as it does as a mechanism of apocalyptic intrigue". David Zurawik of The Baltimore Sun, likewise, said, "It's smart, richly textured, complex and filled with suspense and intellectual challenge--in short, it has all the things network television is supposed to have abandoned in favor of cheap reality shows." San Francisco Chronicle reviewer Tim Goodman said, "If you like big-screen-level thrills and complicated plot structures, you'll opt-in to FlashForward. And you'll be rewarded. Here's hoping it stays strong and compelling as it heads to April 29." Paige Wiser from the Chicago Sun-Times was overall positive towards the premiere episode, comparing it to another ABC series, Lost. Reviewer Ken Tucker of Entertainment Weekly said the premiere combined "sci-fi-ish conspiracy suspense with excellent prime-time-soap drama" giving it a B+.

Some critics, however, had more mixed feeling towards the pilot episode. Tom Shales from The Washington Post gave a mixed-to-positive review of the episode, saying, "The new series seems to share a perhaps fatal flaw of that now-canceled show [Pushing Daisies], which is that the premise becomes so byzantine and the complications so arcane that eventually people just give up on trying to make sense of the darn thing." Los Angeles Times writer Robert Lloyd, said it was "a decent but not brilliant beginning". In her review, Ellen Gray of the Philadelphia Daily News, was not pleased with the outcome, comparing it to the pilot episode of Lost and commenting that "No More Good Days" felt "more like deja vu, with characters who could've been rounded up from a disaster miniseries".

== Awards and nominations ==
In April 2010, this episode was nominated for the Hugo Award for Best Dramatic Presentation: Short Form.

This episode also was nominated for three Primetime Emmy Awards: Outstanding Cinematography for a One Hour Series, Outstanding Music Composition for a Series (Original Dramatic Score), and Outstanding Stunt Coordination.
