= Course Correction (FlashForward) =

- FlashForward episode
- Episode no.: Season 1 Episode 19
- Directed by: Leslie Libman
- Written by: Robert J. Sawyer
- Production code: 119
- Original air date: May 6, 2010

Guest appearances
- James Callis as Gabriel McDow; James Frain as Gordon Myhill; Barry Shabaka Henley as Shelly Vreede; Michelle Hurd as Liz Kayson; Alex Kingston as Fiona Banks; Hannah Marks as Annabelle Campos; Shaun Duke Moosekian as Lahar Bahti; Callum Keith Rennie as Jeff Slingerland; Tim Rock as Michael Zamperion; Ryan Wynott as Dylan Simcoe; Cynthia Addai-Robinson as Debbie; Lena Georgas as Celia Quinones

Episode chronology
← Previous "Goodbye Yellow Brick Road"	Next → "The Negotiation"

"Course Correction" is the 19th episode of the ABC series FlashForward. This is the first episode directed by Leslie Libman, and also the first episode written by Robert J. Sawyer, the writer of the original novel that inspired the series.

== Plot ==
Demetri (John Cho) and Agent Fiona Banks (Alex Kingston) track down a man who has taken it upon himself to kill those who have avoided the death foretold in their flashforwards, thus supposedly helping the universe "course correct" itself. Demetri manages to kill him before he can kill a woman who was supposed to die a week earlier, but Fiona accidentally runs her over. Fiona then receives a phone call from the doctor at the hospital and the conversation they have is the same one that Gough had in his Flashforward. Fiona believes the doctor will call again on April 29 to tell her Celia is dead. This makes Demetri question if the universe will cause him to die.

Mark (Joseph Fiennes) discovers that Simon (Dominic Monaghan) is lying about the circumstances behind his sister Annabelle's disappearance. When confronted with the evidence, Simon tells the truth, and Mark reluctantly agrees to help Simon locate her. Simon finds his sister on a bridge, but Annabelle tells him not to walk too close or "they'll" kill her. She tells Simon to give them the QED (quantum entanglement device) if he wants to see her alive. Later, Mark and a SWAT team find her in an empty van at a warehouse. Thankful, Simon quickly phones her, then runs off. Mark goes to the safe where the QED is, only to find the device gone. Mark then questions Annabelle about her experience, and she says she overheard her captors saying that Simon could cause another blackout.

Lloyd (Jack Davenport) feels guilty about lying in a televised interview, so Olivia (Sonya Walger) tries to ease his guilt. Lloyd confirmed that the blackout didn't cause brain damage, but to be sure, he asks Olivia to show him some MRI records. The result: no brain damage. They both reveal their feelings for each other are growing and share an intimate moment. Just then, Mark comes over to Lloyd's house to ask him where Simon is and sees Olivia there. Lloyd explains he doesn't know where Simon has gone but that Simon is capable of anything and that he always has a plan.

== Title sequence image ==
Gabriel's drawing of Mark's Mosaic investigation board.

== Reception ==
The episode was watched by a series low 4.77 million viewers with a 1.3 rating with adults 18-49. IGN gave this episode a 7.2 rating out of 10, stating they liked "the idea of someone killing off "Blue Hand" members." The A.V. Club gave this episode a D+. Television without Pity gave this episode a B−.
