= Blowback (FlashForward) =

- FlashForward episode
- Episode no.: Season 1 Episode 13
- Directed by: Constantine Makris
- Written by: Lisa Zwerling & Barbara Nance
- Original air date: March 25, 2010

Guest appearances
- Rachel Roberts as Alda Hertzog; Tim "Timbaland" Mosley as Evidence Agent; Mark Famiglietti as Mike Willingham; Genevieve Cortese as Tracy Stark; James Remar as James Erskine; Michael Ealy as Marshall Vogel; Gabrielle Union as Zoey Andata; Laura Marano as Young Tracy Stark; Kavita Patil as Dr. Jane Parker

Episode chronology
← Previous "Revelation Zero (Part 2)"	Next → "Better Angels"

"Blowback" is the thirteenth episode of the American television series FlashForward. The episode's teleplay was written by Lisa Zwerling and Barbara Nance and was directed by Constantine Makris, and was originally aired in the United States on ABC on March 25, 2010.

== Plot ==
=== Aaron's Past ===
Fifteen years ago, Aaron is shown to be in jail, and is being visited by his young daughter Tracy. Aaron promises her he will keep his head down and do his time, but as Tracy is leaving, one of the guards makes sexual remarks about Tracy. Unable to contain himself, Aaron promptly begins a fight.

Another flashback shows Aaron receiving the news of his daughter's apparent death two years ago. After Tracy's memorial, Aaron begins drinking heavily, smashing his chair in grief.

=== Aaron ===
Aaron finds Tracy in a bar, and urges her to come home so as not to risk being found by Jericho. The next morning, Aaron informs Tracy that he has found the CEO of Jericho, James Erskine, of whom they need to be aware. Aaron later meets with Mike, who has his suspicions of Tracy confirmed when Aaron tells him she is still alive. Back at the house, Tracy is kidnapped by masked men and is put into a shipping box. Aaron arrives home and cannot find Tracy, and then realizes that it was Mike who kidnapped her.

The next day, Aaron drives Mike to an abandoned junk yard, where he confronts him about Tracy. Mike tries to stab him, but Aaron fights back and breaks Mike's arm before tying him up in his pickup. Aaron meets with James Erskine, demanding to know where his daughter his, but Erskine claims to know nothing about it. Aaron bugs his telephones and overhears Erskine talking with someone about why Aaron knows about Tracy's kidnapping, and if Tracy's arrived at Khandahar. Erskine tells the man to get Mike to kill Aaron. That night, Erskine's daughter finds Mike hanging upside down on the porch. Aaron calls Mark and tells him that he's gonna be off the grid for a while and they will not see each other for a while.

=== Janis ===
Janis marks the dates January 13 through 19th down, the week that she needs to get pregnant. Janis goes to meet a woman about a sperm bank, and after a while, Janis convinces the woman to accept her as a client.

=== Zoey & Demetri ===
Demetri reveals to Zoey that Mark's gun will be the murder weapon used to kill him in the future. Zoey tells Demetri that what she believed was their wedding was really his memorial. Demetri tells her not to worry, as he had paperwork filled out to have the gun destroyed. The next day, Zoey confronts Mark about why he would want to kill Demetri. Offended, Mark explains it could be because he is the suspected mole in the FBI. Zoey heads over to the headquarters, where she talks Wedeck into letting her get into the FBI files to help them find the mole.

Demetri is annoyed of Zoey's involvement, but knows she's pursuing this only because she loves him. That night, Demetri and Janis talk about their flash forwards coming true. The next day, Zoey interrogates Alda Hertzog, who has information about Demetri's death, and tells her that if she does not want to go to jail, she will tell Zoey what she knows and she will put her on trial to have her released. Demetri is bothered that Alda would be cutting a deal, and decides to alleviate Zoey's fears by telling her he will personally destroy Mark's gun. However, upon reaching the evidence locker, they find out that the gun is gone.

=== Mark and Lloyd ===
Mark is back at the headquarters, interrogating Lloyd Simcoe about what he saw in his flashforward. Mark then takes Lloyd back to Mark's house and tells Lloyd to direct him what he saw. Lloyd shows him that he got out of bed and got a text message from Simon, something about a formula that Lloyd had written over a mirror with lipstick. Mark asks about the q.e.d. he was close to cracking, and Lloyd says that it's either quod erat demonstrandum (which means that which was to be demonstrated) or it could be quantum electrodynamics, which would be something that one would use at the beginning of a formula, like the one on the mirror. Mark asks Lloyd about D. Gibbons, and while Lloyd initially claims he doesn't know him, he later reveals he does. Lloyd explains that D. Gibbons's real name is Dyson Frost, who took credit for Lloyd's research of "wave structure of matter". Mark asks Lloyd if he was the one that had told Charlie that D. Gibbons was a bad man, but Lloyd denies this.

The next day, Mark tells Wedeck some information about Dyson Frost, who used to do experiments on mirror tests on animals, including crows. Wedeck tells Mark that they cannot get into Somalia, but Vogel tells him that they can by pretending to be workers of Red Panda. Vogel tells Mark that he cannot go with him to Somalia because losing Mark in Somalia would be a catastrophe because he is the key to the entire investigation. Vogel recruits Janis and Demetri to join him, and upon Simon's request, recruits him also.

== Title sequence image ==
"Happy Birthday" written on Mike Willingham's chest.

== Reception ==
This episode was watched by 6.17 million American viewers, another series low. The show was rated a 1.8 with adults 18-49. The A.V. Club gave this episode a D, stating "it felt like a giant mish-mash of things that just sort of happened because the actors needed to be given something to do."
