= The Cape (2011 TV series) =

2010 American superhero drama TV series

- Genre: Action-adventure; Drama; Superhero
- Created by: Tom Wheeler
- Starring: David Lyons; Keith David; Summer Glau; James Frain; Jennifer Ferrin; Ryan Wynott; Dorian Missick; Martin Klebba
- Composer: Bear McCreary
- Country of origin: United States
- Original language: English
- No. of seasons: 1
- No. of episodes: 10 (1 aired online)

Production
- Executive producers: Simon West; Gail Berman; Lloyd Braun; Gene Stein; Tom Wheeler
- Producer: Peter Chomsky
- Cinematography: John Newby
- Editor: Casey Brown
- Running time: 45 minutes
- Production companies: Universal Media Studios; BermanBraun; Arcanum; Open 4 Business Productions

Original release
- Network: NBC
- Release: January 9 – March 11, 2011

The Cape is an American superhero drama television series, first shown on NBC during the 2010–2011 television season as a mid-season replacement. A two-hour pilot episode aired on Sunday, January 9, 2011 at 9 pm Eastern and Pacific Time, and was repeated the next day. Further episodes aired on Monday evenings at 9 pm from January 17. NBC reduced the number of episodes ordered from 13 to 10 due to low ratings.

On March 2, 2011, NBC canceled the series after one season. It was also announced that the series finale would be shown only on the network's website.

== Plot ==
The series, set in fictional Palm City, California, follows Vince Faraday, an honest detective who decides to leave the police force after he witnesses the murder of a new police chief by a mysterious villain known as Chess. Faraday accepts an offer to work for ARK, a private security firm owned and operated by billionaire entrepreneur Peter Fleming. ARK is petitioning Palm City to privatize the police and public safety operations.

A video streamed to Faraday from an investigative blogger known only as Orwell leads him and partner, Marty Voyt, to a cargo train owned by Fleming's firm. They discover the train is smuggling implosive weapons of mass destruction (WMDs) inside children's toys. Voyt is corrupt and delivers Faraday to Chess, who reveals himself as Fleming. Fleming frames Faraday for the police chief's murder. In a news event staged by Fleming, Faraday is "revealed" as Chess as an ARK security team chases him along the city waterfront. A tanker explosion causes Faraday's apparent death.

Faraday is abducted by The Carnival of Crime, a traveling circus turned bank robbery ring, who later accept him as one of their own. Their ring leader, Max Malini, trains Faraday in circuscraft and in the use of a special cape made entirely from spider silk. While there is nothing magical about the cape, Malini shows Faraday how a talented illusionist can use it to simulate superhuman abilities, and promises to show Faraday the 26 unique effects of the cape. Faraday agrees, and commits to grueling physical and mental training required to master the illusions. Additionally, Max convinces Faraday that using a secret identity keeps Faraday's wife and son safe. Faraday decides to fight Palm City's corruption and clear his name by adopting the visage of his son's favorite comic book hero, The Cape.

In the series finale, "Endgame", The Cape exposes ARK's corruption. Fleming asserts that he is innocent. He paints Voyt, now the chief of his private police force, as a corrupting influence who has usurped daily control of ARK. Faraday's wife, Dana, prepares Voyt's legal defense and convinces him to turn state's evidence. Fleming decides to eliminate both families before Voyt can testify. The Cape hides both families with the Circus, but Fleming's assassins find them. During the assault, Voyt sacrifices himself to save The Cape. As Voyt dies in The Cape's arms, Faraday reveals his identity and forgives Voyt's betrayal. The series ends with Fleming still at large; Faraday's family still believes him dead, but Orwell assures Dana that Faraday still loves her, implying that he is still alive.

== Cast and characters ==
=== Main cast ===
- David Lyons as Vincent "Vince" Faraday / The Cape – A former soldier and an honest cop who is presumed both dead and a murderer by the residents of Palm City. He is constantly trying to prove that Peter Fleming is Chess, and becomes the Cape to help fight crime and corruption throughout the city. Faraday is an excellent investigator, and an above-average fighter before going into hiding, having had years of training and experience during his time in the army, which would later be expanded upon by the circus crafts he later learns from Max Malini during his training by the "Carnival of Crime". He becomes proficient in boxing, wrestling, hypnosis, escapology, tightrope walking, stage illusions, and in some acrobatics, which help him duplicate the extraordinary powers of his comic namesake. He also takes-up mithridatism. These efforts are further aided by a unique cape given to him by Max Malini, which had been specifically designed for these illusions (his training included emphasis on all thirty-seven illusions involving a cape). In addition to his attempts to clear his name, Faraday also uses the persona of "The Cape" to visit his son anonymously for short periods of time and give him hope. According to Faraday, the Faraday family have been in law enforcement for generations.
- Keith David as Maxwell "Max" Malini – The ringleader of a gang of circus-performers-turned-bank-robbers known as "The Carnival of Crime". He mentors Vince after saving him and trains him to become the Cape. Despite being a criminal, who is willing to steal from good or bad people, he shows a strong knowledge of right from wrong, and abhors the use of killing, operating on what would appear to be a strong moral code. In "Razer", Max informs Ruvi that the real reason he's training Vince is because of someone called "Deveraux".
- Summer Glau as Orwell – An investigative blogger who wages war on the crime and corruption in Palm City, (her blogger moniker is a nod to George Orwell). She becomes Vince's behind-the-scenes ally and helps him, even though she is trying to keep her life and her reasons a secret. She is also a skilled fighter. During a hallucination in the episode "The Lich (Part 2)", it is revealed that Orwell's first name is "Jamie" and that she may harbour secret feelings for Vince. It is confirmed that she is the grown, biological daughter of Peter Fleming, and hinted that he (or she) had done something to her mother. There have been hints in the final episode that she fears she is going down the same dark path as her father, due to his genes, starting with reoccurring migraines, blackouts and hallucinations of an ominous white door; her endgame is likely that she seeks to reveal her father's dark-side to the world before she seeks medical attention for her blackouts. She has not disclosed her true identity to Vince, and uses a number of aliases and disguises, posing as reporters, and continues to elude her father's attempts to find both her, and "Orwell" (believing them to be two separate people).
- James Frain as Peter Fleming / Chess – The billionaire founder/CEO of Ark Industries and the Cape's nemesis. He is a criminal mastermind, serial killer, expert hand-to-hand combatant, and is skilled with firearms. He is responsible for framing Vince for the murders. When appearing as his alter ego, Chess, Fleming's pupils appear as chess pieces, specifically a knight and a rook; it is revealed in the episode "Razer" that this change is made with contacts. He has an obsession with the game of chess, as he sees everything around him as merely a game, often using chess terminology in his speech. In "Scales", Fleming reveals he is a mechanical engineer. It has been strongly implied that Fleming has multiple personality disorder, as he has had conversations with his Chess persona, who urges him to kill everyone. The Chess persona tends to emerge when Fleming is stressed or threatened, though as the series progresses he becomes stronger, coming to the surface without Fleming's consent. He is somewhat protective of Fleming and reawakens in Fleming's mind after several assassination attempts by Dice. In the episode "Kozmo", it is revealed that he was trained as a soldier in Iran.
- Jennifer Ferrin as Dana Faraday (née Thompson) – Vince's wife, who believes her husband has died. She takes a job in the public defender's office so she can give others what Vince never got, a chance to prove their innocence in a court of law.
- Ryan Wynott as Trip Faraday – Vince's son, who idolizes the Cape. Vince hopes the Cape will convince Trip that there are good people left in the world.
- Dorian Missick as Marty Voyt – A secretly corrupt police detective and friend to Vince. He is employed by Fleming because he fears for the safety of his own family. He continually visits the Faraday family to deliver more false "evidence" showing that Vince was really Chess. He was named as ARK's new Chief of Police in the episode "Goggles and Hicks". In the episode "Endgame", when evidence implicates Fleming as 'Chess', Fleming tries to frame Voyt as having been 'Chess' all along (as he'd done with Vince Faraday). Dana Faraday manages to convince Voyt to turn state's evidence against Fleming/'Chess', but after an assassination attempt, The Cape is forced to publicly reveal himself to save Voyt's life and hide him and Voyt's family away, only for Voyt to be shot (taking a bullet for The Cape) and killed by Scales (on Fleming's orders to silence him) just as he and his family are leaving Palm City by train, but not before The Cape unmasks himself to Voyt, letting him know that he had survived.
- Martin Klebba as Rollo – A dwarf who plays the role of strong man in Malini's circus gang. He is a good fighter, as is proven when he first fights Vince and wins and later easily wins against Scales with a wrench. He is shown to have a crush on Orwell.

=== Recurring cast ===
- Vinnie Jones as Dominic Raoul / Scales – A frightening criminal menace with a freakish skin condition that gives him the appearance of being covered with green and gold scales. His "scales" make him more resistant to damage. He is an enemy of the Cape. It was revealed in the episode "Scales" that he was at one time part of a circus sideshow due to his skin condition.
- Richard Schiff as Patrick Portman – Palm City's Commissioner of Prisons, and the sole city leader standing in the way of Peter Fleming/ARK's complete assumption of the city's public safety services. In "Scales", Portman reveals himself as a Cape wannabe, although he is realistic about his actual abilities.
- Mather Zickel as Travis Hall – Dana's Boss.
- Izabella Miko as Raia – An alluring acrobat in Max's circus and a member of the Carnival of Crime.
- Anil Kumar as Ruvi – A hypnotist in Max's circus and a member of the Carnival of Crime. He's constantly reminding Vince not to get cocky, every time Vince slips up. As a mentalist/hypnotist, Ruvi considers himself a 'Surgeon of the Mind', and considers neurotoxins and their use in his line of work as to be no-better than a "blunt tool". He is also only in the "Carnival of Crime" for the gains, and not really open for any noble reasons, like Max. In "Razer", Max informs Ruvi that the real reason he's training Vince is because of someone called "Deveraux", (who Deveraux is has not been revealed).
- Elliott Gould as Samuel – Peter Fleming's psychiatrist who has been helping him try to control and ultimately banish Chess from Fleming's mind. He is one of the few people who is not intimidated by Chess' violent outbursts and threats. In one episode, he and Chess seem to be conspiring against Fleming, although this also could be Samuel trying to lull Chess into a false sense of security.

=== Guest stars ===
- Raza Jaffrey as Raimonde LeFleur / Cain – A French serial killer and master of knife throwing and poison. He is a member known as The Tower in the assassin organization Tarot, as their poisons user. This dangerous mercenary was hired by Chess to kill the Palm City prison commissioner, but failed due to the Cape's interference and was scarred across the face in the ensuing battle.
- Thomas Kretschmann as Gregor Molotov – A Russian magician known as "Gregor the Great" who considers himself to be a master illusionist, contortionist, and escape artist extraordinaire. He was the former student of Max, training under the stage name "Kozmo the Unkillable", and was the last owner of the cape before Vince took over. Gregor was imprisoned for 20 years for murdering a woman and was sent to various prisons throughout Russia, each of which he managed to escape. When Vince was given the choice between killing Gregor and sending him to jail, Vince allowed him to live, despite warnings that Gregor would certainly escape and return for the cape.
- Mena Suvari as Tracey Jarrod / Dice – A savant who specializes in probabilities by breaking down the world in the language of quantum mechanics. She can predict the future through complex mathematical probability which she can do in her head, (although the Cape represented an anomalous addition to her equations that threw off her predictions), and is the first of her kind, which Peter has studied so they can make T.R.A.C.E., a portable future predictor via data-mining. However, Tracey has a dark side with sociopathic tendencies and connection issues. Tracey is the daughter of research physicist Henry Jerrod, one of Chess' victims, and seeks revenge on Chess, wanting to kill him for her father's death, which she had predicted (but made no attempt to actually stop, save for telling them both it would happen). Her attempts on Peter's life reawaken the Chess persona, who had briefly been under wraps.
- Pruitt Taylor Vince and Chad Lindberg as Goggles & Hicks – Brothers, and a high-tech team of professional contract killers, who are the members of Tarot known as The Chariot. The two are hired by Peter Fleming to kill the Cape. They have their subjects down to a science: first they track them, then they study them by getting to know everything about their marks intimately before they kill them when the time is right. Goggles is the techie with his expertise in creating new gadgets (his catch phrase is "you can run, but you can't hide"), while Hicks is the assassin – the only other people he meets are the ones he kills.
- Glenn Fitzgerald as Conrad Chandler / The Lich – The heir of a Palm City founder, William Chandler, and his wife, Greta Chandler, who abandons him at an asylum called The Orchard sanitarium as an infant: Born with a skin condition, called "morgellons leiche", (meaning "skin of the dead"), he has a horrifically scarred physical appearance, and is insensate to physical pain (Congenital insensitivity to pain). His mother abandoned him at the Orchard sanitarium, admitted under the name "Ronald Recchand" (an anagram of "Conrad Chandler"), and the Chandler Family's Lawyer helped them to cover-up almost all record of his continued existence, whilst the public is left to believe that the Chandler's had merely suffered from a miscarriage. After his mother abandoned him as an infant, Conrad was physically abused by the staff repeatedly, (because they knew that he could feel no pain and could get away with it), and were the first to start calling him "The Lich". Over the years, Conrad bided his time, learning, and after gaining access to the sanitarium's supply of drugs and pharmaceuticals, (and having learned to make "potions"), he slowly took over the sanitarium, enslaving his former tormentors. As the son of the "Oppenheimer of chemical weapons", Conrad developed his own synthetic neurotoxin that causes paralysis and a deep suggestive state of the mind that slows the vital signs to make a person appear dead. He goes on to commit a series of seemingly-supernatural crimes. This leads the police department to dub him "The Lich", a moniker synonymous with "boogeyman", after a file in every Palm City precinct containing unusual or strange cases such as ritual killings, unsolved murders, kidnappings, and cults. Convicts on Owl Island told Rollo about a "psycho" with a face "like a corpse" who hired them to rob a hospital, (he punished them for their failure by removing a finger from each of their hands). With both of his parents long-dead, Conrad's lifelong goal has been to punish the people responsible for his abandonment, such as the Chandler Family Lawyer (who was still alive), the people of Palm City, (for being gullible sheep to have believed the lie about his mother's miscarriage), and Peter Flemming, (for trying to take away his birthright). During his bid for revenge, he becomes fixated upon 'Carrie Woodhouse'/Orwell, who unwittingly provides him with the proof he needed to legitimize his claim to his family's estate, and tries to marry her.
- Grant Bowler as Razer – An Australian bomb-maker who is contracted by Scales to kill Max to gain complete control over Trolley Park. He considers himself an artist at making bombs. As part of his allure, no one knows what he looks like. It is rumored that he has a wooden leg and the left side of his face is scarred from a bomb blast from his own creation. In "Razer", Vince interrupts Razer's arrival and disguises himself as the dangerous villain to become a member of Scales' gang and infiltrate his inner circle to sabotage his plan.
- Michael Irby as Tommy Molinari / Pokerface – An associate of Scales who took on the moniker because he never blinks as a result of a gunshot wound to the head, lodging a bullet in his brain. Because he cannot blink, he requires frequent doses of eye drops administered by one of his lackeys. Vince once managed to replace his eye drops with turpentine and in retaliation Pokerface suggested Scales use acid on Vince when later they captured him.

== Episodes ==
No.	Title	Directed by	Written by	Original release date	US viewers (millions)
1	"Pilot"	Simon West	Tom Wheeler	January 9, 2011	8.45
Palm City police officer Vince Faraday is framed for a series of crimes that were actually committed by the mysterious villain Chess, revealed to be Peter Fleming, CEO of the mega-corporation ARK. Farady manages to elude custody, but is presumed dead and taken in by a gang of circus performers who are also bank thieves. Their leader Max Malini trains Vince and imbues him with the abilities of a superhero. Determined to clear his name and be reunited with his family, Vince takes on the persona of his son's favorite comic-book hero, the Cape. On his first outing in his quest to bring down Chess, Vince meets Orwell, an anti-corruption electronic espionage expert who keeps a whistleblower blog on the activities of ARK and Fleming/Chess.
2	"Tarot"	Deran Sarafian	Tom Wheeler	January 9, 2011	8.45
The Cape must battle Chess' latest accomplice: a serial murderer named Cain who specializes in poisons, and who is a member of the secret Assassin Order called the Tarot. Chess tries to take down the one man who keeps him from controlling the prisons, Patrick Portman, (Richard Schiff) the secretary of prisons, but the job proves difficult when The Cape, Orwell, and the circus gang help him save the target.
3	"Kozmo"	David Jackson	Craig Titley	January 17, 2011	6.22
Russian convict Gregor Molotov, previous wielder of the cape, escapes prison and seeks to reclaim it for himself. Vince is able to defeat Gregor and decides to allow him to live despite warnings that he will likely escape from prison and come back for the cape again. Dana discovers a witness that informs her her husband was not Chess. Orwell meets Max and the circus.
4	"Scales"	Dennie Gordon	William Wheeler	January 24, 2011	5.85
The Cape informs villain Scales that Peter Fleming/Chess has betrayed him in the business deals when he's paying money to the same person twice. This information eventually leads to Scales confronting Fleming on the Monte Carlo train during the costume gala. Meanwhile, Max and his "carnival of crime" plan to rob the same train during the party. Additionally, it's Trip's 10th birthday and Vince feels frustrated that he will be is missing it, so is Dana as she is stuck in traffic and races home to celebrate with her son.
5	"Dice"	Michael Nankin	Tom Wheeler	January 31, 2011	5.34
When Peter Fleming reveals a new program called T.R.A.C.E. that's capable of predicting every single move a person makes in the future, he inadvertently attracts the attention of a very special, deadly mastermind: the daughter of research physicist Henry Jerrod and one of Chess' victims, Tracey, a savant who calls herself Dice (Mena Suvari). Since Dice also knows Fleming's alter ego, Chess, the Cape must do whatever it takes to keep Fleming alive in order to clear his name—including elevating his skills to new heights by learning to walk a high wire. Meanwhile, Dana tries to bond more with Trip as they cope without Vince. Also through the episode Flemming is trying to retain control and fears that these assassination attempts will reawaken Chess. By the end of the episode Chess returns; glad that Peter wants to play again.
6	"Goggles and Hicks"	Deran Sarafian	Craig Titley	February 7, 2011	4.58
After Faraday's last adventure, which resulted in broken ribs, Max decides the Cape must take a day off. While Faraday recuperates, Fleming hires two professional killers, Goggles and Hicks (Pruitt Taylor Vince and Chad Lindberg), also members of the Tarot known as Chariot, to kill the Cape once and for all. Meanwhile, Dana confronts Marty after his promotion to Police Chief about telling her the truth about Vince's case.
7	"The Lich (Part 1)"	Karen Gaviola	William Wheeler	February 14, 2011	4.07
After a woman Rollo dated named Janet Peck is found dead, Max enlists Vince, the cop to gather evidence at her grave site. Meanwhile Vince, The Cape tries to alert Police Chief Marty Voyt of an impending threat to the city during the Founder's Day parade. However, his attempt backfires when Marty follows Fleming's orders to set up The Cape. Orwell receives some help from Patrick Portman about Conrad Chandler (Glenn Fitzgerald), the founding heir of Palm City.
8	"The Lich (Part 2)"	Roxann Dawson	Toni Graphia & Robbie Thompson	February 21, 2011	4.15
With Orwell's location unknown, The Cape must seek Dana's legal connections to track down the Lich's whereabouts. She enlists the help of her boss, Travis Hall so he can get access to the interrogation room where one of The Lich's followers, Preston Holloway (Tom Noonan) is being held. The Cape, Max and Rollo then break into the Orchard to rescue Orwell who has been drugged by Conrad Chandler's paralyzing toxin. She struggles to fight the effects of this potent serum and has hallucinations of her wedding day and an uninvited guest, Peter Fleming, who claims he is her father.
9	"Razer"	David Straiton	Tom Wheeler & William Wheeler	February 28, 2011	4.10
Scales makes a tenuous alliance with Fleming to protect his gang's territory and calls a dangerous villain, Razer (Grant Bowler), to the city. However, Vince interrupts Razer's arrival and takes his place by disguising himself to gain entry into Scales' gang. With the help of his doctor, Fleming battles his alter ego, Chess, while Orwell battles her own demons, alluding to an unclear future, trapped in isolation with a dark state of mind.
10	"Endgame"	Ernest Dickerson	Christine Roum	March 11, 2011 (NBC.com)	N/A
The Cape and Vince Faraday's world collide and hard truths are revealed—Police Chief Marty Voyt lands behind bars, in the hands of ARK Corporation, fearing he may receive the same fate as Vince. Attempting to learn more about Vince's disappearance, Dana takes on Marty's case, and the impervious ARK Corporation, only to discover secrets of betrayal. The city becomes aware of The Cape's existence when Vince must conduct a daylight rescue, and his double identity becomes blurred when Max and the carnival of crime attempt to protect Dana, Marty and his family.

== Reception ==
The Cape has generated mixed reviews from critics, scoring a 54 out of 100 on Metacritic. Critic Ken Tucker described the show's premiere as "fun, refreshingly free of irony" with "a sensibility that allowed for a sense of humor without slipping into tiresome campiness." Other proponents of the show have said "if the premise sounds cheesy or busy, the execution is crisp and efficient" and "someone in network land has learned a lesson from Heroes." At the same time, Matt Zoller Seitz criticized the series pilot for failing to develop its narrative effectively. While having no complaints about the premise of the series, he wrote that the pilot "rushes through everything, pulverizing potentially engaging characters and story until the whole production starts to feel like a long trailer for itself." Peter Swanson of Slate wrote that the series "falls into a wasteland of its own making, where neither the stakes nor the jokes can distract one from the thinness of its writing."

The special Sunday two hour debut of the show garnered a 2.6 in the key 18–49 demographic. It placed third overall in terms of top science fiction genre network premieres for the 2010–2011 season, behind fellow NBC show The Event and ABC's No Ordinary Family. For its first non-repeat airing in its official Monday timeslot the show had dropped 31% to a 1.8 rating, and the next two episodes received a 1.6 and a 1.5 respectively.

The Cape was nominated for a 2011 Primetime Emmy Award for Outstanding Prosthetic Makeup for a Series, Limited Series, Movie or Special for the ninth episode, "Razer".

== Web comic ==
As they did earlier with Heroes, NBC released webcomics to supplement The Cape on the official website.

== Music ==
The original music for The Cape was composed by Bear McCreary. In contrast to the brand of music used by Hans Zimmer for Christopher Nolan's Batman films, McCreary's scores for the series were in a more classically heroic mode in the style of Shirley Walker's work on Batman: The Animated Series. On September 27, 2011, La-La Land Records released a two-disc album of McCreary's work on the series, featuring selections from all episodes but "Razer" and "Endgame" (the last two episodes - "The Lich, Part 2" was the final episode to be scored to picture), plus the original song "Let's Just Pretend," which was written by Brendan McCreary and performed by Young Beautiful in a Hurry; the album is dedicated to Walker's memory in honour of her influence on Bear McCreary's music.

Disc one
No.	Title	Length
1.	"THE CAPE Main Title"	0:49
2.	"A New Day Ahead (from “Pilot”)"	3:02
3.	"The Death of Vince Faraday (from “Pilot”)"	4:18
4.	"The Carnival of Crime (from “Pilot”)"	4:10
5.	"The Greatest Circus Act That Ever Lived (from “Pilot”)"	6:32
6.	"The Faraday Family (from “Pilot”)"	2:00
7.	"Confronting Chess (from “Pilot”)"	6:16
8.	"Gregor Molotov (from “Kozmo”)"	2:59
9.	"Asylum Fight (from “The Lich, Part 2”)"	1:00
10.	"Orwell’s Dream (from “The Lich, Part 2”)"	2:16
11.	"Waltz for Raia (from “Kozmo”)"	1:59
12.	"Rube Goldberg Death Machine (from “Dice”)"	3:19
13.	"Scales in the Cage (from “Scales on a Train”)"	1:53
14.	"Cain (from “Tarot”)"	2:52
15.	"Scales (from “Pilot”)"	1:49
16.	"Unnatural Things (from “Kozmo”)"	7:04
17.	"Young Tracy (from “Dice”)"	2:59
18.	"Kitchen Battle (from “Tarot”)"	4:46
19.	"Casino Attack (from “Dice”)"	2:27
20.	"Justice Takes Time (from “Kozmo”)"	3:42
21.	"The Lich (from “The Lich, Part 2”)"	3:30
22.	"The Telepath Strikes (from “Dice”)"	4:13
23.	"Gregor the Great’s Carnival of Fear (from “Kozmo”)"	5:56
Total length:		79:51

Disc two
No.	Title	Length
1.	"Let’s Just Pretend (from “The Lich, Part 2”)"	4:25
2.	"Sewing the Mask (from “Tarot”)"	4:39
3.	"Runaway Train (from “Scales on a Train”)"	3:15
4.	"Ghosts of Palm City (from “The Lich, Part 1”)"	5:44
5.	"Highwire Training (from “Dice”)"	2:59
6.	"Faradays are Fighters (from “Tarot”)"	3:40
7.	"Concerto for Tuba and Goggles (from “Goggles and Hicks”)"	3:15
8.	"Attack of the Bumblebee (from “Goggles and Hicks”)"	2:15
9.	"Opposite Sides (from “Scales on a Train”)"	2:19
10.	"Two Weddings (from “The Lich, Part 2”)"	4:12
11.	"Brazil Nuts (from “Scales on a Train”)"	4:47
12.	"Kozmo (from “Kozmo”)"	2:41
13.	"Orwell’s Recovery (from “The Lich, Part 2”)"	1:48
14.	"Scales Goes Rogues (from “Scales on a Train”)"	4:55
15.	"Rescuing Orwell (from “The Lich, Part 2”)"	3:21
16.	"The Cape Keeps Watch (from “Tarot”)"	0:48
17.	"Jerry (from “Goggles and Hicks”)"	1:44
18.	"Outsmarting the Assassins (from “Goggles and Hicks”)"	1:34
19.	"Trolley Park Amusements (from “Tarot” and “Scales on a Train”)"	2:27
20.	"Palm Reading (from “Dice” and “Kozmo”)"	2:27
21.	"Portrait in Courage (from “Tarot”)"	1:53
22.	"The Dead Will Rise (from “The Lich, Part 1”)"	6:21
23.	"Out the Window (from “Tarot”)"	2:36
24.	"No Journey Too Far (from “Scales on a Train”)"	2:05
25.	"ARK Corporation Theme Song (from “Pilot”)"	1:07
26.	"Homeless Blues (from “Kozmo”)"	1:11
Total length:		78:17

== Connection to Community ==
The Cape received minor recognition when the series was continuously mentioned on another NBC show Community. Throughout the episode "Paradigms of Human Memory", the character of Abed voices his love of the show and his disappointment over it getting cancelled. The most notable scene is when Abed fashions a cape for himself and attempts to mimic the show's protagonist only to anger the character of Jeff Winger who yells "Show's gonna last three weeks!" Abed yells back "Six seasons and a movie!" This line was adopted by the Community fanbase when it appeared the show was close to being cancelled. The show would eventually go for an additional sixth and final season while moving to the streaming service Yahoo! Screen, while a movie is currently in development and set to stream on Peacock.

In the episode "Pillows and Blankets", which parodies the Ken Burns documentary The Civil War, Keith David provided the narration. At the end of the episode, Jeff Winger interrupts him and asks if he was on The Cape, to which David responds "No." David would eventually join the cast as Elroy Patashnik in the final season when it was moved to Yahoo! Screen. In "Advanced Introduction to Finality", Abed Nadir meets his evil doppelganger in the darkest timeline and he is informed that The Cape was renewed in their world for a third season, switched to cable, and was retooled, making it better.
