= Revelation Zero (Part 2) =

- FlashForward episode
- Episode no.: Season 1 Episode 12
- Directed by: Constantine Makris and John Polson
- Written by: Quinton Peeples
- Original air date: March 18, 2010

Guest appearances
- Ricky Jay as Ted Flosso; Lindsay Crouse as Nicole's Mother; Gil Bellows as Timothy Cooke; James Cosmo as Phillip; Michael Massee as D. Gibbons; Claire Jacobs as Lorraine Campos; Marc Mechaca as Wheeler; Karl Herlinger as Quarny; Michael Ealy as Marshall Vogel; Brian Skala as Adam Campos; Josh Kelly as Graham Campos; Hannah Marks as Annabelle Campos; Rodney Rowland as Victor; Amy Rosoff as Marcie Turoff

Episode chronology
← Previous "Revelation Zero (Part 1)"	Next → "Blowback"

"Revelation Zero (Part 2)" is the twelfth episode of the American television series, FlashForward. This episode was written by Quinton Peeples and was directed by Constantine Makris and John Polson. It originally aired in the United States on March 18, 2010 on the ABC TV network, along with the first half of the episode, Revelation Zero (Part 1).

== Plot ==
=== The day of the blackout ===
Simon is at his father's funeral in Toronto, Ontario, Canada. He gets into a car to go back to the funeral home, but the driver tells him that he has instructions to fly Simon to a baseball game in Detroit. Simon goes to the game, where he is called by his boss, D. Gibbons, who tells him to put on a ring. He does so, and the blackout happens, all spectators in the stadium lose consciousness, while Simon remains awake. Gibbons tells Simon to go to the nearest exit. He does so, and through the security footage, he is shown to be "Suspect Zero". His driver, Victor and Flosso are waiting for him. Flosso and Gibbons are directing the FBI away from discovering what caused the blackout to trying to discover who "Suspect Zero" is. Flosso asks for his ring back, and leaves Victor to take Simon back home. Before leaving, Flosso tells Simon that he is sorry for the so-called "hunting accident" which Simon's father had. Simon realizes that it was Victor who killed his father and strangles him to death, deciding to use the murder as his "vision".

=== Nicole and Bryce ===
Nicole and Bryce go into a coffee shop, where Nicole is set to talk with Timothy. Nicole asks Bryce to get a change of pennies and put it in a backpack she brought. Nicole tells Timothy about her vision of getting drowned by someone, and Timothy tells her that she was probably getting baptized, and that she fainted, not died. He tells her that the visions are only tiny clips of their future, and when they see the big picture, they will fully embrace it, because, as of right now, it is not free will versus fate, it is free will and fate working together to get them to where they are supposed to be in the future. That night, Bryce decides to meet Nicole's mother, who is crazy. Bryce sees that all the pennies he got were for the mom, who is gluing them to the wall, but only the ones marked 1989, which is the year Nicole was born, and the wall is a tribute to her. Bryce asks her if she thinks God caused the blackout. She says that she receives a hallucination everyday, and no one believes her, but what people think is coincidence is really God doing his work. Later, Bryce meets up with Timothy, asking him what he is trying to sell to Nicole because he does not want her to get hurt. Timothy explains that he is just doing what he believes will get him to what he is doing in the future: become a religious speaker.

=== FBI ===
Marshall and Demetri find the location of an EMT's cellphone, which will direct them to the stolen ambulance, which should lead them to where Lloyd and Simon are being held captive. As Demetri, Janis, Marshall and a SWAT team enter the building, they do not find Simon and Lloyd, but they do find the vehicle. One of the officers opens the back of the vehicle, only to find it triggered with a bomb. The bomb explodes, killing the officer and destroying the vehicle. Marshall informs Demetri that the bomb squad discovered the code for the bomb: it is a bureau frequency, meaning it was triggered by their walkie-talkies when they came into the building.

=== Mark ===
As Mark leaves "Red Panda Industries", he finds a "Crown Cheese Steak" flier on his windshield, and remembers seeing one with the words "HELP US" written in blood in his vision. He goes to the restaurant, and finds nothing, but he learns that the restaurant is at a new location, the old one having burned down during the blackout. Mark then travels to the original location. Meanwhile, Flosso comes in with Wheeler and Quarny, telling Lloyd that he knows about his son, and if he does not tell him how many electron volts were generated during their experiment, they will kill Dylan. Lloyd gives him the answer, and Flosso leaves telling Quarny and Wheeler to get rid of them. Meanwhile, Mark arrives at the restaurant but it is locked. As Mark is about to leave, he remembers something else from his flashforward: as he is yelling at Lloyd, he tells him he wishes Lloyd was standing behind the eight-ball when he crashed through. Mark then realizes that there was an eight-ball spray painted on the doors to the restaurant. Mark drives back to the restaurant, and backs his car through the doors, just as Wheeler and Quarny are taking Lloyd and Simon out of the basement. Quarny stays behind to deal with Mark, while Wheeler tries to escape. Simon picks up Wheeler's gun and chased him outside, where he shoots him in the head, killing him. Meanwhile, Mark attacks Quarny and punches him until he is unconscious for slapping his wife in the face. The next day, Mark brings Lloyd into the office to question him about not telling the FBI what he heard in his flashforward. Lloyd says that he thought talking to a drunk man on a phone in his vision did not seem important.

=== Simon ===
As Simon is being put into an ambulance, recently after killing Wheeler, in the vehicle waiting for him is Flosso, who tells Simon that he is still under his control, and if he does not stop working for the FBI, he will tell the FBI about Simon being "Suspect Zero". The next day, after Olivia treats Simon's wounds, Janis tells him that he cannot go anywhere because he will be on surveillance for nearly getting attacked. Simon, suddenly, starts to have an allergic reaction from the pills Olivia gave him. Janis goes to get help, but Simon, apparently, faked it, and gets on a plane to Toronto. But he is greeted by Janis and a couple of SWAT team members, who are bringing him back to L.A. Simon begs her to let him stay, saying his family needs him because his sister Annabelle ran away since the blackout and he has been coming home every month to look for her. Janis calls Wedeck for permission to stay in Toronto for the night, and her reason is because she thinks Simon is there for another reason. Janis puts a security brace around Simon's ankle, and then Simon takes Janis back to his place. Later that night, Simon escapes from the house by putting tinfoil around his security brace, so Janis could not catch him. Simon arrives at the house of a man named Phillip, who is Simon's professor in quantum physics. He was also the adviser for Simon's designs of the "specialized pulsed laser for a plasma afterburner" in the Ganwar region of Somalia.

Janis finds him again, because Simon has made ten phone calls to Phillip within the month. Simon came to see Phillip to know if there is a possible way to protect people from another blackout, which Phillip claims is impossible. That night, Simon's Uncle Teddy, who turns out to be Flosso, arrives for dinner, both of them pretending to have not seen each other during the interrogation. After dinner, Annabelle calls the house, telling her mom that she wants to come home. Janis calls the FBI to have them trace the location of the phone call. Flosso shows Simon on his cellphone that Annabelle is being held at gunpoint by his men and is reading a script to her mom. Flosso takes Simon outside and shows him Phillip's dead body in the back of the car. Flosso gives Simon one last warning: stop working for the FBI or they will be shipping Annabelle back to Simon, piece by piece. Simon knows that Flosso needs him for something, and in anger pushes him to the ground. Simon knows his Uncle Flosso has emphysema, and with this knowledge, Simon pushes down on Flosso's chest, causing him to have shortness of breath, and after a while he dies. Simon then tells him that no one bosses him around, and no one messes with his father or his sister. Simon continues to go with the story that he tried to save his life by using CPR, hence the marks on Flosso's chest.

== Title sequence image ==
The image in the title sequence is the Hydra painting from Mark's Mosaic investigation board.

== Reception ==
=== Viewership ===
The second half of the two-hour episode was watched by 6.49 million American viewers.

=== Reviews ===
IGN gave the episode an 8.4 out of 10 rating. Entertainment Weekly pointed out how well they recognize the philosophical and spiritual thematic possibilities within their sci-fi premise and that they actually have characters talk about said themes. The A.V. Club gave this episode a B−, stating that "Monaghan's Simon was probably the show's most useless character before tonight."
