= FlashForward =

American television series

- Genre: Drama; Science fiction
- Created by: Brannon Braga; David S. Goyer
- Based on: Flashforward by Robert J. Sawyer
- Starring: Joseph Fiennes; John Cho; Jack Davenport; Zachary Knighton; Peyton List; Dominic Monaghan; Brían F. O'Byrne; Courtney B. Vance; Sonya Walger; Christine Woods
- Composer: Ramin Djawadi
- Country of origin: United States
- Original language: English
- No. of seasons: 1
- No. of episodes: 22

Production
- Executive producers: Brannon Braga; David S. Goyer; Marc Guggenheim; Jessika Borsiczky; Vince Gerardis; Ralph Vicinanza
- Production location: Los Angeles, California
- Running time: 41–44 minutes
- Production companies: ABC Studios; Phantom Four Films; HBO Entertainment

Original release
- Network: ABC
- Release: September 24, 2009 – May 27, 2010

FlashForward is an American television series, adapted for television by Brannon Braga and David S. Goyer, which aired for one season on ABC between September 24, 2009, and May 27, 2010. It is based on the 1999 novel Flashforward by Canadian science fiction writer Robert J. Sawyer. The series revolves around the lives of several people as a mysterious event causes nearly everyone on the planet to simultaneously lose consciousness for two minutes and seventeen seconds on October 6, 2009. During this blackout, people see what appear to be visions of their lives on April 29, 2010, a global "flashforward" six months into the future.

In May 2010, ABC announced that FlashForward had been cancelled. The season finale for Season 1 was shot before it was known the show would be cancelled and showed another flashforward event happening more than 20 years in the future. This more closely followed the original book, which featured a flashforward that peered 21 1/2 years into the future.

== Premise ==
FlashForward is constructed around a high-concept narrative where a mysterious event has caused nearly everyone on the planet to simultaneously lose consciousness for 137 seconds, during which time people see what appears to be a vision of their own life approximately six months in the future: a global "flashforward". A team of Los Angeles FBI agents, led by Stanford Wedeck and spearheaded by Mark Benford and his partner Demetri Noh, begin the process of determining what happened, why, and whether it will happen again. Benford contributes a unique perspective on the investigation; in his flashforward, he saw the results of six months of investigation that he had done on the flashforward event, and he and his team use those clues to recreate the investigation.

The team investigates a number of events related to the flashforward, including "Suspect Zero", who did not lose consciousness during the event because of a quantum entanglement device (QED), the sinister "D. Gibbons/Dyson Frost", and a similar mass loss of consciousness in Somalia in 1991. Meanwhile, personal revelations contained within the flashforwards occupy the personal lives of the principal characters. Mark Benford sees himself relapsing into alcoholism; his wife sees herself with another man; Demetri Noh sees nothing, which could mean that he will not be alive to see the day everyone else has glimpsed or, perhaps, that his future was not set on the day of the flashforward. Other characters grapple with similarly unexpected or surprising revelations in their flashforwards.

== Cast and characters ==
=== Main characters ===
- Joseph Fiennes as FBI Special Agent Mark Benford – Mark's flashforward guides the investigation of the events of October 6. The husband of Olivia Benford and father of Charlie Benford, he is a recovering alcoholic. In his flashforward, he sees himself working on the Mosaic investigation when armed masked men enter his office. He also sees himself drinking, which he tries to hide from his wife.
- John Cho as FBI Special Agent Demetri Noh – Mark Benford's partner at the FBI. He had no flashforward and fears that means he will die, especially after he receives a mysterious phone call telling him that he will be murdered. He is engaged to Zoey, a lawyer who believed her flashforward was about their wedding until she realized it was possibly his funeral. Demetri survives March 15, the date he was supposed to have been killed, thanks to Mark's assistance.
- Courtney B. Vance as FBI Assistant Director Stanford Wedeck – head of the FBI Los Angeles field office. He oversees Mark Benford's team and the October 6 investigation. His flashforward shows him on a toilet reading a newspaper.
- Sonya Walger as Dr. Olivia Benford – Mark's wife and a successful surgeon at a major hospital. She supervises Dr. Bryce Varley. In her flashforward, she is romantically involved with Dr. Lloyd Simcoe, although she had never met him before the blackout. They meet when she treats his autistic son, Dylan.
- Christine Woods as FBI Special Agent Janis Hawk – works at the Los Angeles field office as part of Mark Benford's team. In her vision she was pregnant and having a sonogram, which she finds hard to believe because she is single and a lesbian. She is in charge of watching over Simon later in the series. In "Queen Sacrifice", it was revealed that she is a mole reporting to those responsible for the blackout to keep tabs on the FBI's investigation. In "Goodbye Yellow Brick Road", it is revealed that she is actually a double agent for both the FBI and CIA and at the request of Agent Vogel (who is her CIA contact and handler) was directed to investigate and identify the mysterious blackout conspirators.
- Jack Davenport as Dr. Lloyd Simcoe – an academic at Stanford. Lloyd's estranged wife and mother of his son died during the blackout. He has a son with autism, Dylan, who knows Olivia and whom Charlie mysteriously recognizes. His research partner is Simon Campos, and Lloyd believes they are responsible for the blackout but, according to Simon's uncle, Teddy, they only amplified it, causing it to affect the whole world.
- Zachary Knighton as Dr. Bryce Varley – a surgical intern reporting to Dr. Olivia Benford. He was on the verge of committing suicide due to a diagnosis of stage 4 renal cell carcinoma (kidney cancer) when the blackout occurred. After the blackout he experiences a renewed will to live, and sees his vision as a gift. In "Course Correction", Bryce learns that his cancer is in remission.
- Peyton List as Nicole Kirby – a 19-year-old student and Charlie Benford's babysitter. She was a childhood friend of Aaron Stark's daughter, Tracy. Nicole's flashforward shows her being held underwater by a stranger. She is able to speak Japanese as she spent time in Japan as a child and is able to help Bryce Varley interpret his flashforward which included a sign in Japanese/Kanji.
- Dominic Monaghan as Dr. Simon Campos – a quantum physicist and research partner of Stanford academic Lloyd Simcoe, who does not believe he is responsible for the blackout. He told people that in his flashforward he sees himself fighting and later killing a man, which was actually a lie. In "Revelation Zero (Part 2)", it is revealed that he is "Suspect Zero"; he was given a ring that kept him awake during the blackout. His uncle is the middle man in the deal, and Simon's younger sister is kidnapped by the people that want to control the blackouts. Simon's uncle had previously killed Simon's father, and after he also kills Simon's professor, Simon kills him.
- Brían F. O'Byrne as Aaron Stark – a recovering alcoholic, he is Mark Benford's AA sponsor and close friend. His daughter, Tracy, was presumed killed in action in Afghanistan, but his flashforward showed his daughter alive, mysteriously. In "The Gift", he comes home to find Tracy in his living room. Agents of the military contractor Jericho later kidnap Tracy from his home, and in "The Garden of Forking Paths", Agent Wedeck provides him assistance in getting to Afghanistan to find Tracy.

=== Recurring characters ===
- Ryan Wynott as Dylan Simcoe
- Lennon Wynn as Charlie Benford
- Barry Shabaka Henley as FBI Special Agent Shelly Vreede
- Genevieve Cortese as Tracy Stark
- Michael Ealy as CIA Agent Marshall Vogel
- Gabrielle Union as Zoey Andata
- Michael Massee as Dyson Frost/D. Gibbons
- Lee Thompson Young as FBI Special Agent Al Gough
- Amy Rosoff as FBI Special Agent Marcie Turoff
- Neil Jackson as Lucas Hellinger
- Rachel Roberts as Alda Hertzog
- Yūko Takeuchi as Keiko Arahida
- James Callis as Gabriel McDow

=== Guests ===
- Shohreh Aghdashloo as Nhadra Udaya
- Gil Bellows as Timothy
- Mark Famiglietti as Mike Willingham
- Annabeth Gish as Lita
- Ricky Jay as Flosso
- Alex Kingston as MI6 Agent Fiona Banks

== Production ==
The pilot was written by David S. Goyer (who also directed) and Brannon Braga, from Robert J. Sawyer's novel, with Goyer and Braga executive producing alongside Jessika Borsiczky Goyer, Vince Gerardis, and Ralph Vicinanza.

FlashForward was originally developed at HBO, which sold its option because it thought the show would be a better fit for a broadcast network. After purchasing the series and ordering a pilot, ABC picked up FlashForward for thirteen episodes in May 2009. On October 12, 2009, ABC picked up the series for a 22-episode season. Later the same day, it was announced ABC had ordered a further three episodes for a 25-episode first season, which was later adjusted to 24.

On October 21, 2009, it was announced that executive producer Marc Guggenheim would leave ABC's FlashForward. Co-creator and executive producer David S. Goyer stepped in to replace him as showrunner. On February 5, 2010, Goyer announced he would be stepping down as showrunner to focus on feature films and directing. He remained involved with the show, however. Goyer was replaced as showrunner by his wife, Jessika Goyer, along with Lisa Zwerling and Timothy J. Lea.

On May 13, 2010 (concurrent with the air date of the episode "The Negotiation", and two weeks before the season finale) it was reported that FlashForward would not be renewed for a second season because of the decline of viewers.

Each episode's title sequence includes a hidden image within the FlashForward logo to show a piece of what the episode is about. These images are visible when the sequence is paused at the right time.

=== Season 2 outline ===
In 2015, Robert J. Sawyer publicly shared his memo that he sent to producers and staff writers on February 19, 2010 outlining his suggestion for season two.

== Episodes ==
| No. | Title | Directed by | Written by | Original release date | U.S. viewers (millions) |
|---|---|---|---|---|---|
Part 1
| 1 | "No More Good Days" | David S. Goyer | Teleplay and Television Story by: David S. Goyer & Brannon Braga | September 24, 2009 | 12.47 |
The series opens on a seemingly ordinary day, October 6, 2009, which soon becomes extraordinary when at 11:00 a.m. Pacific Time, everyone in Los Angeles blacks out for two minutes and 17 seconds. It soon becomes apparent the blackouts were worldwide, and were accompanied by a "flashforward" where each person saw what might be his or her life on April 29, 2010, roughly six months into the future. FBI Agent Mark Benford and a team of agents in Los Angeles begin gathering clues as to what might have happened as they struggle to come to terms with their own visions, or in Demetri Noh's case, a lack of one. Meanwhile, Mark's wife Olivia, and daughter Charlie, each have disturbing visions of the future with which they must cope. As the episode closes, FBI Agent Janis Hawk makes a startling discovery: an image from CCTV in Detroit of a man in black, walking through the stadium while everyone around him is unconscious.
| 2 | "White to Play" | David S. Goyer | Story by : Brannon Braga & David S. Goyer; Teleplay by : David S. Goyer & Marc Guggenheim | October 1, 2009 | 10.75 |
The FBI begin to acquire vital clues about the blackout by setting up a website called MOSAIC which leads Mark and Demetri to investigate a possible lead in Utah, and eventually to the conclusion that there were at least two people awake during the blackout. Meanwhile, Olivia meets Lloyd Simcoe, the man from her flashforward, who is the father of the injured autistic boy, Dylan, that she is treating at the hospital. Information from Charlie's flashforward reveals the name "D. Gibbons" to be key.
| 3 | "137 Sekunden" | Michael Rymer | Teleplay by : David S. Goyer & Marc Guggenheim | October 8, 2009 | 9.05 |
Mark and Janis travel to Munich, Germany, to speak with an imprisoned elderly Nazi war criminal who claims to have knowledge about why the blackout lasted exactly 137 seconds, and he has only one requirement: that he be set free and allowed to return to the United States where he once lived. His information does lead Mark to realize something very important about the blackout and an anonymous tip from a mysterious woman leads Demetri to believe that his lack of flashforward means he will die before April 29, which according to his source will be March 15. Mark discovers that a similar blackout had already happened in 1991 in Somalia involving the death of thousands of crows. Meanwhile, Mark's friend and AA sponsor, Aaron Stark, tries to get his ex-wife's agreement to exhume their daughter's remains and have further DNA testing to confirm if it's really their daughter when his vision shows his daughter to be alive. Elsewhere, Demetri Noh's fiancée, Zoey, manages to return from Seattle now that flights have been re-instated but he doesn't tell her about his lack of a future vision. Also, Stanford Wedeck's wife, Felicia, confides in Olivia about her flashforward about raising a young boy not their son during a memorial service for the FBI agents who died during the blackout.
| 4 | "Black Swan" | Michael Rymer | Lisa Zwerling & Scott M. Gimple | October 15, 2009 | 9.07 |
Olivia struggles to accept Bryce's suggestion that a patient's flashforward holds the key to a correct diagnosis and treatment. Olivia continues to ignore Lloyd Simcoe while he is revealed to have connection to a 'Simon' who holds a clue to the blackout. Meanwhile, Demetri accuses Mark of waiting for the future he saw in his flashforward to come true without incident, while Mark feels Demetri is letting his fear of what he witnessed envelop his life. Alda Hertzog, the terrorist suspect that Mark and Demetri arrested, claims not to know what caused the blackout, but she reveals information that it might happen again. Also, the Benfords babysitter, Nicole, returns to town and confides in first a priest and then Mark about her disturbing vision.
| 5 | "Gimme Some Truth" | Bobby Roth | Story by : Barbara Nance; Teleplay by : Dawn Prestwich & Nicole Yorkin | October 22, 2009 | 9.88 |
Mark, Demetri, Vreede, and their supervisor, Stanford Wedeck, are called to Washington DC to testify at a Senate Intelligence Committee to question the MOSAIC investigation of the blackout and the details of Mark's flashforward. Wedeck plays hardball with the President of the United States, Dave Segovia, to let him continue funding for Project MOSAIC, as well as clashes with the belligerent Senator Joyce Clemente who harbors a personal grudge against Wedeck. Back in Los Angeles, Olivia receives an anonymous text, telling her that Mark was drinking in his flashforward. Janis meets and goes on a date with a certain Maya, whom she confides in about her flashforward. At the end, Mark, Wedeck, Demetri, and Vreede in D.C. and Janis in L.A. are attacked simultaneously by unknown assailants.
| 6 | "Scary Monsters and Super Creeps" | Bobby Roth | Seth Hoffman & Quinton Peeples | October 29, 2009 | 8.97 |
As Halloween draws near, Mark, Demetri, and Wedeck return to Los Angeles to look for a connection between an attack made on them and a separate assault on Janis. Lloyd panics when his autistic son, Dylan, walks out of the hospital and ends up at Mark and Olivia's house, claiming to live there which causes a further rift between Mark and Olivia over her flashforward. While Wedeck keeps a bedside vigil for the critically injured Janis at the hospital, Demetri and Agent Gough try to track down clues to the identity of their mysterious assassins with the only clue being a 'blue hand' imprint on one of the dead assassins. Elsewhere, Lloyd's sinister colleague, Simon, arrives in Los Angeles with news that their experiment may have caused the blackout.
| 7 | "The Gift" | Nick Gomez | Lisa Zwerling & Ian Goldberg | November 5, 2009 | 8.57 |
Mark, Demetri, and Wedeck join forces with visiting MI6 Agent Fiona Banks to investigate the mysterious "Blue Hand Club" which may be connected to their would-be assassins as well as a string of recent suicides connected to a suspected doomsday cult. Demetri finally tells Zoey that he had no flashforward which has given him fear that he will die. Meanwhile, Nicole begins volunteering at the hospital where she helps Bryce understand his flashforward after he confides in her about a terminal medical condition of his. Gough commits suicide to prevent his flashforward from coming true. Elsewhere, Aaron receives a surprise visit from a former army buddy of his late daughter's who claims that Tracy is dead. But at the end, Aaron comes home to find his daughter Tracy alive and sitting in his living room.
| 8 | "Playing Cards with Coyote" | Nick Gomez | Marc Guggenheim & Barbara Nance | November 12, 2009 | 8.28 |
Mark cuts his romantic getaway with Olivia short when a tip leads to the discovery of the tattooed assassin seen in his flashforward. Meanwhile, Janis returns to work following her attack, but questions her future as an FBI agent. Simon and Lloyd attempt to settle a major debate over a game of poker. Elsewhere, Aaron learns the truth about daughter Tracy's deadly accident and about a mysterious military contractor group, called Jericho, hunting her.
| 9 | "Believe" | Michael Nankin | Nicole Yorkin & Dawn Prestwich | November 19, 2009 | 7.98 |
Following a string of flashbacks showing Bryce's cancer diagnosis and his thoughts of suicide, Bryce travels to Japan to search for the mysterious Japanese woman, Keiko, whom he saw in his flashforward, while the life of Keiko is detailed in the days before and after her own flashforward. Back in Los Angeles, Aaron becomes concerned over Tracy's odd behavior and excessive drinking since her return from Afghanistan, while his friendship with Mark hits a snag when Mark attempts to track down the person responsible for texting Olivia about how he was drunk in his flashforward. Also, Demetri and co-agents try to find the mysterious woman caller who forewarned him about his impending death.
| 10 | "A561984" | Michael Nankin | David S. Goyer & Scott M. Gimple | December 3, 2009 (Note: This episode aired on November 30, 2009 in Australia and the UK. It was delayed one week in the United States because of the Thanksgiving holiday.) | 7.07 |
Defying Wedeck's orders, Mark and Demetri travel to Hong Kong to find the mysterious woman, Nhadra Udaya, who called Demetri regarding his flashforward and when they do find her, she reveals a disturbing fact that Mark will be the one who will shoot and kill Demetri. Meanwhile, Lloyd and Simon announce publicly that they may have been the cause of the global blackout. While Simon comes to FBI headquarters to cooperate with Wedeck and Janis about some facts involving the case, Lloyd ends up being kidnapped by unknown assailants right at the hospital with Olivia as a witness. Also, Zoey discovers the true meaning of her flashforward that it is not about hers and Demetri's wedding, but of his memorial service.
Part 2
| 11 | "Revelation Zero (Part 1)" | John Polson | Seth Hoffman & Marc Guggenheim | March 18, 2010 | 6.61 |
While Mark is suspended by the FBI for his unauthorized excursion to Hong Kong, Demetri takes on a new partner, CIA Agent Marshall Vogel, in his search for Lloyd. Janis tries to make Simon cooperate with the FBI in their search for Lloyd, but it only results in Simon getting abducted as well. Both Lloyd and Simon are held captive by a shady middleman, named Ted Flosso, who wants Lloyd to disclose all his research about the blackout. Also, Nicole speaks to a motivational speaker to help her restore her faith and help her understand her horrifying flashforward after she confides in Bryce about catching a glimpse of the man who was drowning her in their vision. Therapy helps Mark remember key details in his flashforward that allow him to find and rescue both Lloyd and Simon. Simon's role as "suspect zero" in the flashforwards is revealed as he and Janis work to take down their adversaries as more details about the global blackout and of Simon's connection to Flosso, and D. Gibbons is revealed during his visit to his family in Toronto.
| 12 | "Revelation Zero (Part 2)" | Constantine Makris and John Polson | Quinton Peeples | March 18, 2010 | 6.61 |
| 13 | "Blowback" | Constantine Makris | Lisa Zwerling & Barbara Nance | March 25, 2010 | 6.17 |
Mark questions Lloyd about a phone conversation from their flashforwards and he reveals more about his work and facts about the mysterious D. Gibbons. When Tracy is abducted from his house, Aaron relentlessly seeks out the CEO of the shadowy Jericho military unit who are after his daughter. Meanwhile, Zoey desperately tries to prevent Demetri's destined future by demanding access to the MOSAIC files as the date for his supposed death draws near which causes a further rift between her and Demetri.
| 14 | "Better Angels" | Constantine Makris | Scott M. Gimple & Ian Goldberg | April 1, 2010 | 5.04 |
The MOSAIC team of Janis, Demetri, Vogel, and Simon arrive at the deserted village in Somalia to investigate the mysterious tower where they are held hostage by a group of local Somali militia whose leader, Abdi, was a witness to the 1991 blackout in the village. They also find a taped interview with villagers and a personal message for Demetri from the blackout mastermind D. Gibbons, aka: Dyson Frost. Back in America, Charlie finally admits to Mark and Olivia that, in her flashforward, she overheard a man talking to another about Mark's death. Also, Bryce finally tells Nicole his secret that he has cancer.
| 15 | "Queen Sacrifice" | Bobby Roth | Byron Balasco & Timothy J. Lea | April 8, 2010 | 5.42 |
Mark moves out of the house to protect his family from Dyson Frost and the conspiracy. Vogel and Mark put the entire FBI office into lockdown in order to find the leak in the FBI connected to the blackout conspirators. When they find the mole, Simon later on discovers a second one. Meanwhile, Keiko continues her search for Bryce, and gets a job as a mechanic, but later gets arrested for being an illegal immigrant, while Bryce continues to struggle with his own romantic feelings for Nicole.
| 16 | "Let No Man Put Asunder" | Bobby Roth | Seth Hoffman & Quinton Peeples | April 15, 2010 | 4.98 |
Olivia and Lloyd grow closer in their concern for their kids' best interests. Mark and Demetri investigate a murder committed by Frost using Mark's stolen gun. With the date that Demetri is supposed to die coming up, he and Zoey decide to move their wedding up to the following day, but Demetri is kidnapped by Dyson Frost, hours before the ceremony. Demetri's background story is revealed of his first days at the FBI and his meeting and engagement to Zoey. Meanwhile, Janis reveals to Demetri that she is pregnant after their one-night stand together in Somalia. Also, Wedeck provides assistance to Aaron so that he can get to Afghanistan to find his daughter.
| 17 | "The Garden of Forking Paths" | Nick Gomez | David S. Goyer & Lisa Zwerling | April 22, 2010 | 5.53 |
Dyson Frost holds Demetri captive in an abandoned warehouse while he plans a meeting with Mark. When Mark and Frost finally meet face-to-face, Frost is killed by the conspirators just after revealing some possibly important information about a coming second blackout. Meanwhile, Olivia finally discovers that Dyson was the one who sent her the text message explaining that Mark was drinking in his flash forward. Also, Alda Hertzog wants to strike a deal to tell Zoey information about Demetri's whereabouts, but Alda naturally has an agenda of her own. Part of Alda's background story shows her recruitment by the blackout conspiracy and her first meeting with Dyson Frost.
| 18 | "Goodbye Yellow Brick Road" | Nick Gomez | Nicole Yorkin & Dawn Prestwich | April 29, 2010 | 5.17 |
Janis' background story is revealed that she is a double agent for both the blackout conspiracy and the CIA, passing information to her contact Carlene, and taking directions from Vogel, who is her handler. Mark tries to study the mysterious blueprints that Dyson Frost left behind about the QED rings, while Janis is ordered to steal the blueprints and must cover up her tracks before Mark or anyone else discovers her secret. Meanwhile, Aaron infiltrates an Afghan village and finds the man from his flashforward, and nearly loses his life in the process. Gabriel McDow, a savant, comes to Olivia with key information about Dyson Frost's experiments and leads her and Agent Shelly Vreede to a closed down mental hospital where Frost's flash forward experiments were conducted.
| 19 | "Course Correction" | Leslie Libman | Robert J. Sawyer | May 6, 2010 | 4.77 |
Demetri and MI6 Agent Fiona Banks attempt to track down a killer as questions arise about the universe course-correcting itself, when people who thought they'd escaped their fates are found dead. Meanwhile, Mark reluctantly agrees to help Simon find his abducted sister, Annabelle, but discovers he's withholding the truth about her true circumstances as he plans to steal the QED ring from the FBI vault to hand over to the conspirators. Wedeck and the rest of the FBI finally discover the identity of Suspect Zero. Elsewhere, Nicole learns the whereabouts of Keiko, the Japanese woman in Bryce's flash forward, but struggles with whether to share this information, due to her growing feelings for him, while Bryce receives good news that his cancer is in remission.
| 20 | "The Negotiation" | Leslie Libman | Story by : Debbie Ezer; Teleplay by : Byron Balasco & Quinton Peeples | May 13, 2010 | 4.75 |
On April 28, the day before everyone's futures will be revealed, Olivia brings Gabriel to the FBI office where Mark and the agents debrief him to find out what he knows. Janis is forced to react when she's ordered to kill Mark by her conspirator handler, so she decides to give them Gabriel, unaware that Mark is already onto Janis' secret. Meanwhile, Demetri is conflicted over whether to travel with Zoey to Hawaii for their wedding. Now a fugitive, Simon meets a benefactor named Hellinger. Hellinger and Lita are two of several leaders of the conspiracy who want Simon to help them create another blackout. In Afghanistan, Aaron and Kahmir mount a rescue attempt to save Tracy from the Jericho compound. Wedeck confronts President Segovia over the secret Jericho missions in Afghanistan.
| 21 | "Countdown" | John Polson | Lisa Zwerling & Seth Hoffman | May 20, 2010 | 5.26 |
On April 29, the day everyone's futures will happen, Mark interrogates the captive Lucas Hellinger for information about the next Blackout, but Hellinger refuses to disclose any information and further plays on Mark's deteriorating sanity over what will happen. Meanwhile, Simon demands Janis to help him enact revenge on the blackout conspiracy. Demetri breaks up with Zoey and she leaves for Hawaii without him. In Afghanistan, Aaron discovers the real reason why Jericho wants Tracy dead which involves a blackout project Jericho enacted two years earlier in Afghanistan. Lloyd figures out the equation in his flashforward, while Demetri debates helping Janis and Simon break into NLAP. Nicole must make a fateful decision in her relationship with Bryce when she confides in him that she knows that Keiko is in Los Angeles.
| 22 | "Future Shock" | John Polson | Timothy J. Lea & Scott M. Gimple | May 27, 2010 | 4.96 |
The day seen in the flashforwards arrives. Most of the flash forwards come true, but in some cases with alterations. Keiko's mother creates a distraction at LAX, enabling Keiko to escape and meet Bryce at the restaurant. A distraught Nicole crashes her car into water; her flashforward actually showed her being rescued by a young man, Ed, whose own flashforward told him to be there. Olivia leaves town with Charlie, but Lloyd and his son convince them to return home to maintain the conditions for Lloyd's breakthrough. In Afghanistan, Tracy survives her injuries. At NLAP, Janis uses a real medical emergency as a distraction for Simon and Demetri, who nevertheless fail to prevent another blackout. Janis and her doctor are surprised when the ultrasound shows a healthy boy instead of a girl. Mark gets drunk and Wedeck bails him out of jail when the FBI building receives a bomb threat. They kill several assassins. Mark learns that the next blackout is imminent, providing just enough warning for basic safety precautions. Mark is seemingly caught in the building's explosion. Humanity loses consciousness; Lita, wearing a QED ring, abducts a hospitalized Janis. People apparently experience flashforwards to varying future dates.

== Release ==
=== Broadcast ===
FlashForward aired on ABC on September 24, 2009 through May 27, 2010.

=== International distribution ===
FlashForward has sold in over 100 territories worldwide. Overseas air-dates are typically close to the original U.S. broadcasts, in an attempt to limit piracy. The series airs on AXN in Mexico, Argentina, Chile, Brazil, Bulgaria, Colombia, the Czech Republic, Hungary, Japan, AXN in Poland, Portugal, Romania, Serbia, Venezuela, and Uruguay. It airs in Australia on the Seven Network, in Austria on ORF1, in Canada on /A\, and in Estonia on Fox Life. In Greece it is broadcast on FX, in Hong Kong on TVB Pearl, in New Zealand on TV2, and in Russia on Channel One. In Singapore it is shown on MediaCorp Channel 5 and Starhub Fox Channel – Channel 505, in Slovakia on TV JOJ, in Slovenia on TV3 Slovenia, in South Africa on M-Net, in Taiwan on Public Television Service, and in Turkey on Dizimax and ATV. In Western Europe, FlashForward airs on Kanal 5 in Denmark, Nelonen in Finland, Canal + and TF1 in France, ProSieben in Germany by RTÉ Two, in Ireland, TV 2 in Norway, Cuatro in Spain, TV4 in Sweden, TSR1, La 2 & SF zwei in Switzerland, ORF1 in Austria, Five in the United Kingdom, Fox in Italy, Veronica in the Netherlands, BeTV in Belgium, and SIC in Portugal. It is also aired in the Philippines on Studio 23. In Israel it airs on Satellite TV yes stars Action as well as Cable TV HOT3., in Indonesia by RCTI.

=== Home media ===
Season 1, Part 1 of the series was released on DVD on February 23, 2010. This DVD has the first ten episodes, plus bonus material. The full series was released on DVD on August 31, 2010 (including more bonus material). The full series was also supposed to be released on Blu-ray on the same date, but the Blu-ray release was indefinitely delayed and later cancelled. The first 2 discs of the 5-disc full series set are the same as the 2-disc set of episodes 1-10.

It is available for digital purchase through Amazon Prime Video, YouTube, Google Play, and Vudu. On February 23, 2021, the show was added to the steaming platform, Disney+ in Europe, Australia, New Zealand and Canada.

== Reception ==
Graph of the American viewing figures of the first season of FlashForward.

=== Ratings and viewership ===
Although launching to large audiences of 12.47 million viewers in the US, the show's ratings rapidly declined to ratings about one-third that figure. The show's scheduling in the US was held to blame by some people; an unexpected extended hiatus may have contributed to the deteriorating fanbase. However, in other countries such as the UK, where the show was given prime time scheduling on terrestrial television, ratings also dwindled. In the UK, the show was screened on Channel Five, a channel which receives fairly poor viewing figures in comparison to its peers.

The show was watched by an average of 8.5 million viewers per episode, ranking it 44th most watched show of the season.

=== Critical reception ===
FlashForward received generally positive reviews, with a Metacritic score of 71 out of 100, based on 26 critic reviews. Rotten Tomatoes reported an 80% approval rating with an average rating of 8.1/10, based on 35 critic reviews; the website's critics consensus reads, "FlashForward robustly entertains with an addictive concept, top-notch production, and an exciting apocalyptic setting."

In September 2009, Tim Goodman of the San Francisco Chronicle deemed the series "enormously entertaining" with a "tantalizing premise", while Ginia Bellafante of The New York Times wrote that it "begins in such a spirit of bracing suspense that [she was] challenged to recall another pilot that lured [her] so quickly into addiction." Variety's Brian Lowry gave a more measured review, opining, "It's an intriguing, mind-bending concept that's mostly well executed [...] there's a solid desire to see more but not such wonderment as to proclaim unwavering fealty until the show peers a little farther down the road." Entertainment Weekly's Ken Tucker graded the series "B+", stating, "FF isn't perfect. Much thought has been given to plot and character but not enough to the visuals: This is one of the most drab-looking of intelligent shows. Thematically, FF makes major philosophical points— living in the moment, etc.—but instead of dramatizing them, it often just has its characters speak them." Tucker described the show as "combin[ing] sci-fi-ish conspiracy suspense with excellent prime-time-soap drama".

=== Awards and nominations ===
Awards and nominations for FlashForward
| Year | Presenter | Award | Result |
|---|---|---|---|
| 2009 | People's Choice Awards | Favorite New Television Drama | Nominated |
| 2009 | Image Awards | Outstanding Supporting Actress in a Drama Series: (Gabrielle Union for the role of Zoey Andata) | Nominated |
| 2009 | American Society of Cinematographers | Outstanding Achievement in Cinematography in Episodic/Pilot Television for Jeffrey Jur for the episode "The Gift" | Nominated |
| 2010 | Primetime Emmy Awards | Outstanding Cinematography for a One-Hour Series | Nominated |
| 2010 | Primetime Emmy Awards | Outstanding Music Composition for a Series (Original Dramatic Score) | Nominated |
| 2010 | Primetime Emmy Awards | Outstanding Stunt Coordination | Won |
| 2010 | Hugo Award | Best Dramatic Presentation (Short Form) – Brannon Braga, David S. Goyer, and Robert J. Sawyer for the episode "No More Good Days" | Nominated |
| 2010 | Constellation Awards | Best Television Series | Nominated |
| 2010 | Constellation Awards | Best Overall Science Fiction Film or Television Script - Brannon Braga and David S. Goyer for the episode "No More Good Days" | Won |
| 2010 | Visual Effects Society Awards | Outstanding Supporting Visual Effects in a Broadcast Program - Kevin Blank, Andrew Orloff, Steve Meyer, Jonathan Spencer Levy for the episode "No More Good Days" | Nominated |
| 2010 | Visual Effects Society Awards | Outstanding Created Environment in a Broadcast Program or Commercial - Kevin Blank, Andrew Orloff, Steve Meyer, Jonathan Spencer Levy for the freeway overpass sequence in the episode "No More Good Days" | Nominated |
| 2011 | Constellation Awards | Best Television Series | Nominated |
| 2011 | Constellation Awards | Best Overall Science Fiction Film or Television Script - Robert J. Sawyer for the episode "Course Correction" | Nominated |

== See also ==
- Retrocausality
- Conflict thesis, a.k.a. Draper–White thesis
- Particle accelerators in popular culture
- The Feynman Lectures on Physics
