= List of FlashForward characters =

Below is a list of characters in the scifi television series FlashForward.

== Main characters ==
FlashForward began with nine star billed roles. From episode six on, Dominic Monaghan is billed as a regular cast member.

- FBI Special Agent Mark Benford (Joseph Fiennes) — A brooding and introverted agent at the local FBI office in Los Angeles, Mark's flashforward guides the investigation of the events of October 6. The husband of Olivia Benford and father of Charlie Benford, he is a recovering alcoholic. In his flashforward, he sees himself working on the Mosaic investigation when armed masked men enter his office. He also sees himself drinking, which he tries to hide from his wife. In the final episode, It is unknown if Mark survived the building explosion. As of season 1, Mark has appeared in all 22 episodes.
- FBI Special Agent Demetri Fordis Noh (John Cho) — Mark Benford’s hot-blooded and impulsive partner at the FBI. He had no flashforward and fears that means he will die, especially after he receives a phone call telling him that he will be murdered on March 15, 2010. His best friend is Janis Hawk, a fellow FBI Agent who went to school with him. Demetri eventually sleeps with Janis in order to help her conceive a baby, even though he is engaged to Zoey, a lawyer who believed her flashforward was about their wedding until she realized it was possibly his funeral. Upon finding this out, Zoey dumps Demetri. Demetri survives March 15, the date he was supposed to have been killed, thanks to Mark. As of season 1, Demetri has appeared in all 22 episodes.
- FBI Assistant Director Stanford Wedeck (Courtney B. Vance) — Head of the FBI Los Angeles field office. He oversees Mark Benford's team and the October 6 investigation. His flashforward shows him on a toilet reading a newspaper. As of season 1, Stan has appeared in all 22 episodes
- Dr. Olivia Benford (Sonya Walger) — Mark's wife and a successful surgeon at a major hospital. She supervises Dr. Bryce Varley. In her flashforward, she is romantically involved with Dr. Lloyd Simcoe, although she had never met him before the blackout. They meet when she treats his autistic son, Dylan. As of season 1, Olivia has appeared in 21 episodes.
- FBI Special Agent Janis Hawk (Christine Woods) — Works at the Los Angeles field office as part of Mark Benford's team. In her vision she was four months pregnant and having a sonogram, which she finds hard to believe because she is single and a lesbian. She is in charge of watching over Simon later in the series. In Queen Sacrifice, it was revealed that she is a mole reporting to those responsible for the blackout. In Goodbye Yellow Brick Road, we find out she is actually a double agent for the FBI and CIA at Agent Vogel's request. As of season 1, Janis has appeared in 19 episodes.
- Dr. Lloyd Simcoe (Jack Davenport) — An academic at Stanford. Lloyd's estranged wife and mother of his son died during the blackout. He has a son with autism, Dylan, who knows all about Olivia and whom Charlie mysteriously recognizes. His research partner is Simon Campos, and Lloyd comes to believe that they are responsible for the blackout but, according to Simon's Uncle Teddy, they only amplified it, causing it to affect the whole world. He is kind-hearted and always tries to do the right thing. As of season 1, Lloyd has appeared in 17 episodes.
- Dr. Bryce Varley (Zachary Knighton) — A surgical intern reporting to Dr. Olivia Benford. He was on the verge of committing suicide due to a diagnosis of stage 4 renal cell carcinoma (kidney cancer) when the blackout occurred. After the blackout he experiences a renewed will to live, and sees his vision as a gift. His flashforward shows him alive and well in a sushi restaurant, and meeting a pretty young Japanese woman. However, in failing to initially locate her in Japan, Bryce decides to pursue a romance with Nicole Kirby instead. In Course Correction, Bryce learns that his cancer is in remission. As of season 1, Bryce has appeared in 16 episodes.
- Nicole Kirby (Peyton List) — A 19-year-old college student and Charlie Benford's babysitter. She was a childhood friend of Aaron Stark's daughter, Tracy. Nicole's flashforward shows her being held underwater by a stranger. He is later revealed to be rescuing Nicole from drowning, rather than drowning her. She is able to speak Japanese. She befriends Bryce Varley and eventually has a romantic fling with him until she discovers Keiko Arahida is looking for him. As of season 1, Nicole has appeared in 14 episodes.
- Dr. Simon Campos (Dominic Monaghan) — A quantum physicist and research partner of Stanford academic Lloyd Simcoe, who doesn't believe he is responsible for the blackout. He told people that in his flashforward he sees himself fighting and later killing a man, which was actually a lie, as he had already killed that man. In Revelation Zero (Part 2), we find out that he is actually "Suspect Zero"; he was given a ring by the conspirators that kept him awake during the blackout. His uncle is the middle man in the deal, and Simon's younger sister is kidnapped by the people that want to control the blackouts. Simon's uncle had previously killed Simon's father, and after he also kills Simon's professor, Simon kills him. As of season 1, Simon has appeared in 15 episodes.
- Aaron Stark (Brían F. O'Byrne) — A recovering alcoholic, he is Mark Benford's AA sponsor and close friend. His daughter, Tracy, was presumed killed in action in Afghanistan, but his flashforward showed his daughter alive. In The Gift, he comes home to find Tracy in his living room. Agents of the military contractor Jericho later kidnap Tracy from his home, and in The Garden of Forking Paths, Agent Wedeck provides him assistance in getting to Afghanistan to find Tracy. As of season 1, Aaron has appeared in 17 episodes.

== Government ==
- Fiona Banks (Alex Kingston) works for New Scotland Yard in London. After the global blackout, Fiona receives a call from FBI agent Al Gough, asking her to corroborate their flashforward. In their vision, Fiona and Al were in a meeting discussing the Rutherford case when a bird crashed into the window. Fiona's information assists the team in discovering that all of the flashforwards showed the same time. Due to the time difference between London and Los Angeles, Fiona's flashforward is dated as April 30, 2010. Fiona is credited for the first time as a guest star in episode seven, "The Gift", when she arrives in Los Angeles for a meeting with the team investigating the blackout. Fiona is already familiar with Al Gough through her flashforward, although paradoxically the two have not yet met. Fiona is continuing (or beginning in the case of the paradox) her investigation into Ian Rutherford. She is present when Al commits suicide in an attempt to render the flashforwards false, and is seen after his death taping up the window of the office she is supposed to meet him in on April 29. In a continuity error, Fiona was said to be working for New Scotland Yard in the first episode. By the seventh episode, Stanford Wedeck reveals her to be working for MI6.
- Joyce Clemente (Barbara Williams) is a US Senator who is chairwoman at an investigation into the global blackout in Washington DC. Clemente questions several people about their theories of the blackout, including a man (Michael O'Neill) affiliated with the CIA accusing China of the incident. Wedeck and Benford take the stand and are both questioned regarding their ongoing investigation into the blackout. Clemente asks why Mark cannot recall everything from his flashforward, as most people could easily recall every second that they saw. Her questioning leads Wedeck to doubt and call Mark's flashforward into question. She also has a history with Wedeck, who is known to have worked in Washington, D.C. She reveals to him that she saw herself as the President of the United States in her flashforward, though is unsure whether to believe it or not, though she would like to. In the second half of the season she becomes Vice President of the United States. In a meeting with Wedeck, she reveals that Jericho has something to do with her becoming President.
- Al Gough (Lee Thompson Young) was an agent working for the FBI field office of Los Angeles. He made his first appearance in the opening episode, when he is seen discussing the flashforwards with his colleagues. He revealed that he saw Inspector Fiona Banks in his flashforward, and later called her to corroborate the stories. Banks agreed and revealed having seen him in her flashforward. An evidence sheet with Al's name on it is seen in Mark Benford's flashforward. In "Black Swan", Al and Mark discuss with Stanford whether to follow up on the lead about Somalia. After Stanford vetoes the suggestion, Mark asks Al about the possibility of asking a hacker to hack into the system to spy on the investigation. By the end of the episode, Mark asks Al to contact the hacker, disturbing Al as he enters the name "Celia" into the Mosaic Collective. Al commits suicide in episode seven, "The Gift", in an attempt to reassure the rest of his team that the future is unwritten despite the flashforwards. He gets the idea after discussing putting tape over the window of the office that he and Fiona are due to meet in on April 29, so that the bird will not fly into it. Whilst Fiona suggests the bird might die somewhere else, Al remains adamant that the future can still be rewritten. An extended version of his flashforward appears in this episode, where Al is seen talking to his attorney about a woman named Celia, whom he is revealed to have lethally injured in an accident and who has been taken off life support and died about an hour before, some time before April 29, 2010. Al writes Celia a letter revealing that the future is yet to be written and that she will live to see April 29.
- Miss Levy (Jessica Tuck) works for homeland security, and attends a meeting in this episode with the FBI agents behind the Mosaic Collective, notably Stanford Wedeck, Mark Benford and Demetri Noh. Levy reveals that her team have analyzed the ring that Suspect Zero was wearing and that it bears the symbol, Alpha. The team see Levy's evidence as unhelpful, considering they were hoping for facial definition. Levy subsequently reveals that Demetri Noh has been flagged by her security team for his conversation with a woman from Hong Kong who informed him of his upcoming murder. Levy is reluctant to give the information, only offering it after Demetri gets angry.
- Anastasia Markham (Lynn Whitfield) is the Deputy Secretary of Homeland Security. She appears in the second episode, "White to Play", when she visits the FBI field office of Los Angeles having heard about the team set up to investigate the flashforwards. Anastasia is initially cynical of the team and how much they will be able to contribute, but soon changes her mind after seeing evidence of Suspect Zero, the man seen awake in the baseball stadium during the blackout. She recognizes how wrong she was to doubt the team after their discoveries by the end of the episode.
- Dave Segovia - Played by Peter Coyote. Segovia is the President of the United States, who makes his first appearance of the series playing basketball with Stanford Wedeck. He later gives a conference to several journalists and agents in Washington DC, where he discusses the global blackout. When asked, he refuses to discuss his flashforward to those gathered before him, although his flashforward is revealed to the audience. In it, he is awoken in the night whilst sleeping and alerted to a potential danger. Segovia later attends a meeting with Wedeck, where he tells him he really could have used his help on the government and now has a position for him as the Director of Homeland Security. However, Wedeck later uses information against Segovia to secure funding for the Mosaic Collective. This information is a photograph of the President in a romantic position with Renée Garrigos, who is revealed to be living in Georgetown. In a news bulletin, it is revealed that Segovia has nominated Joyce Clemente as his Vice President, in the wake of the death of the previous incumbent in the global blackout. According to Clemente's flashforward, she is to succeed him as the President, meaning that Segovia will be removed from office by April 29, 2010 (assuming Clemente was telling the truth about her flashforward, which was never shown to the audience).
- Marcie Turoff - Played by Amy Rosoff. Marcie makes her first appearance in this episode where she appears to be a representative of the Mosaic Collective. She later reappears in episode five, Gimme Some Truth, having been assigned to work on the Mosaic Collective. She is on friendly terms with Janis Hawk and Al Gough. Marcie questions Janis about her romantic life, revealing that Janis has not yet told her colleagues that she is a lesbian. Marcie, alongside Janis and Al, discover the presence of five transmitters installed in Somalia in April 1991 - just before the apparent blackout that occurred there. In Queen Sacrifice, Marcie was arrested after she was found to be a mole within the FBI Mosaic Collective task force.
- Marshall Vogel (Michael Ealy) is a CIA agent who becomes a part of the Mosaic task force.
- Shelly Vreede (Barry Shabaka Henley) is an FBI agent working for the field office in Los Angeles. Vreede realizes that his flashforward foresees the same day as everybody else: he saw the date, April 29, 2010, on the news. Vreede is present in "Black Swan", when he and Demetri interview Alda. Vreede enters the information provided by Alda and allows Demetri to follow up the lead.

== Family members ==
- Zoey Andata (Gabrielle Union) — Demetri's fiancée and a criminal defense attorney. She was in Seattle, Washington at the time of the blackout. In her flashforward, she initially believed she was attending her wedding to Demetri, but now realizes that this is his funeral. She leaves Demetri after he admits to her that he slept with Janis to allow her flashforward to become a reality.
- Charlie Benford (Lennon Wynn) is Mark and Olivia's six-year-old daughter. Her flashforward shows her listening to two men who said that her father is dead.
- Dylan Simcoe (Ryan Wynott, Bryce Robinson in the pilot) is Lloyd's son, who is autistic and knows Olivia and Charlie from his vision. He writes the blackout formula seen in his father's vision.
- Kate Stark (Kim Dickens) is the ex-wife of Aaron Stark, and the mother of the presumably deceased Tracy Stark. She works in a bar, the same bar that she sees in her flashforward, where she sees the same people and serves them the same drinks. Aaron asks her to sign an agreement allowing for the exhumation of their daughter Tracy's remains, following his flashforward where he saw Tracy alive and well. Kate refuses, but due to Aaron's connections with the FBI, via his friend Mark Benford, the exhumation goes ahead anyway, and a DNA test confirms that the remains belong to Tracy. Aaron goes to see Kate and tells her. Kate comforts her ex-husband as he finally comes to terms with Tracy's death.
- Tracy Stark (Genevieve Cortese) is the daughter of Aaron and Kate Stark. Sometime in 2007 she was believed to have been killed in Afghanistan where she was working as a soldier; her remains were buried in the US. However, in her father's flashforward he saw her alive in a military tent. Aaron gets his ex-wife Kate's permission to exhume Tracy's remains. The DNA is proven to be Tracy's. Tracy makes her first appearance outside of Aaron's flashforward in episode seven, "The Gift", when she is shown in a flashback of how she was killed. Alongside her colleague Mike Willingham, Tracy was pursuing an enemy SUV when terrorists turned on them and fired a rocket propelled grenade (RPG). Mike escaped the truck although Tracy's door jammed and she was struck by the RPG and still in the vehicle when it exploded. Tracy is seen again waiting in Aaron's apartment, inexplicably. This episode was the first time that Genevieve Cortese is credited as a guest star for her role as Tracy. In the episode "Playing Cards with Coyote", Tracy is shown to have an artificial leg. She explains her leg was blown off in the explosion, and her father realizes that it was the leg that was found and buried, explaining her DNA result. Tracy claims she has been in hiding for two years from a private military force that wants her dead.
- Felicia Wedeck (Gina Torres) is married to the director of the Los Angeles field office, Stanford Wedeck. She meets with Olivia Benford and discusses her flashforward. In it, she sees herself tucking a young boy into their son's bed. More so, he calls her Mommy. Later, at the memorial service for agents killed during the blackout, Felicia sees the young boy at the front of the memorial service. It is never shown if her flashforward comes true but Wedeck does state in one episode he has to get home to his "family".

== Blackout conspirators ==
- Flosso (Ricky Jay) accepts a mysterious case from another "star armed guy" and opens it to reveal what appear to be six identical rings. He says "there was supposed to be seven" and kills the delivery man. He later interrogates Lloyd for information. Flosso turns up at Simon's family house as Simon's distantly-related "Uncle Teddy" that has been nurturing and following Simon's physics career since his teenage years. Flosso is most likely named after magician Al Flosso as Ricky Jay is also a magician.
- Dyson Frost/D. Gibbons (Michael Massee) is the main villain of the series. He orchestrated the global blackout and its aftermath. He has had hundreds of FlashForwards, in most of which he dies on March 15, 2010 - the same day as Demetri. In a message for Demetri that Dyson recorded in 1991, he states that his and Demetri's destinies are "on collision course". He has used the alias D. Gibbons. Mark and Demetri discover that he has seen the end of the world, but the data on the event is destroyed before they can collect it.
- Lucas Hellinger (Neil Jackson) was a man who first appeared when he interrogated Lloyd. When Lloyd refused to answer his questions, Flosso took over. A flashback reveals that before the blackout, he introduced Alda Hertzog to Dyson Frost (both of whom he employed). In the penultimate episode, he is revealed to be the leader of the GBO conspiracy.
- Alda Hertzog (Rachel Roberts) is a person of interest being pursued by FBI agents Mark and Demetri on the day of the global blackout. After the blackout, Alda awakes, her SUV having crashed and her two fellow conspirators having both been killed. Alda mentions her flashback, claiming that the "horses were scared" and that she was "somewhere else." Demitri takes Alda into custody and questions her. Alda claims that she wasn't behind the blackout. Her FBI case file is on the wall in Mark's flashforward. Alda returns to the series in "Black Swan", when she is interviewed by Demetri and Agent Vreede. She is cagey in her interview, denying any link to terrorism and refusing to tell the agents her real nationality. She also vehemently denies having anything to do with the blackout. However, she shows an awareness of the fact that Demetri has not had a flashforward, having overheard others in the office talk about it, and uses this to get at him during the interview. She offers them one piece of information, the name of a restaurant in Indio, California. This leads Demetri and Mark to discover a drug dealer in possession of vast amounts of drugs and a case used for nuclear components. She accuses Mark of not waiting around for the answers he is looking for, which leads him to ask for a hacker's help in hacking into the CIA for information on the Somali incident.
- Nhadra Udaya (Shohreh Aghdashloo) is a woman apparently calling from Hong Kong who calls Demetri Noh after reading his entry in the Mosaic Collective. She reports that in her flashforward, she was reading the personnel file of a deceased FBI agent - Demetri. She tells him that, according to the file, he will be murdered on March 15, 2010. A photo of her appears alongside her name in Mark's flashforward. The woman remains a mystery until episode 10, when she is tracked down by Mark and Demetri in Hong Kong. She has two bodyguards and is reluctant to give up any information about what she knows, stating that this will lead to Demetri's murder in any case. After being pressured, she reveals that Mark will shoot Demetri three times, the information being known as a result of the serial code of Mark's gun, A561984. After she refuses to give any more information, Mark takes her hostage, although she is eventually apprehended by the CIA. Nhadra asks her men to lower their weapons, and as a result so does Mark, before being taken into custody by the CIA. He warns Nhadra that this isn't over, to which she responds that it never is. At the end of this episode, she is seen talking to a chess playing man implied to be D. Gibbons.
- Carline (Lee Garlington) is Janis' contact, working at a pet emporium.
- Lita (Annabeth Gish) is the woman who recruited Janis.

== Minor characters ==
- Ingrid Alvarez (Elizabeth Rodriguez) was a bird store owner who video taped a "3 stars on the forearm" guy and his partner shoot someone in an alley behind her store. They took a small case that was later given to a "Mystery Man" at the end of the show. After a sting arranged by the FBI, she was to be put into witness protection after Janis Hawk revealed that one of the criminals had escaped. Ingrid accepted this fate, claiming that this was the explanation for her flashforward - seeing herself working as a zookeeper in the Bronx Zoo.
- Keiko Arahida (Yūko Takeuchi) is a Japanese woman living in Tokyo, working for a leading Japanese robotics firm. Whilst this is Keiko's first appearance in the series as a guest character, she has previously been seen through drawings belonging to Bryce Varley, who met with Keiko during his flashforward. Keiko decides to leave her job as an engineer as a result of sexual discrimination, being required to make tea during office meetings, due to her status as the only female member of the department. After leaving her job, Keiko leaves her family's home and heads for Los Angeles to Bryce. They are both on the same plane from Tokyo, but miss each other upon arrival. Keiko has a tattoo on her wrist, the Japanese symbol that Nicole Kirby has previously described as meaning "Believe". Keiko is shown to have a mother, Yuuka (Hira Ambrosino), and sister, whilst her parents have also been noted as working in a restaurant. In her flashforward, she was running to a sushi restaurant, where she eventually meets Bryce Varley, who is shocked to finally see her. The pair are intimate and overjoyed at meeting each other. Keiko was announced as a new character by producer David Goyer on November 9, 2009, introducing her as "the subject of episode nine."
- Rudolf Geyer (Curt Lowens) is a former Nazi who contacts the FBI claiming to have some information regarding the global blackout. Mark Benford and Janis Hawk fly to Munich, Germany, where he is being held to discuss the information with him. Geyer bargains with the agents, telling them that he will only discuss the information if they agree to release him, should the information be viable. Mark and Janis disagree, with Mark wanting to allow the man's release, believing him to be of no threat, being in his eighties, and also claiming the information must be useful as Geyer's picture was on the wall in his flashforward. Janis disagrees, saying that even though Geyer is old, he was a former Nazi and involved in one of the worst genocides in recent history. Eventually Mark agrees to the release. Geyer offers his information - after he awoke from the blackout he saw hundreds of crows dead in the prison compound. Mark is angry, feeling used by the old man. However, the information eventually leads the agents to discover that the same thing has happened to the crows before, back in 1991 Somalia - this leads Mark to question whether a similar event to the blackout may have happened before. Geyer is only released after his flashforward is verified by the man in it - Customs officer Jerome Murphy (Jeff Richards).
- Didi Gibbons (Stephnie Weir) is a cupcake baker, and a person of interest of the FBI. After the global blackout, Didi turned herself in to the LA field office, asking to speak to Benford and Noh. She only knew the names of the agents having seen them in her flashforward, where she was arguing angrily with some creditors. She reportedly called every field office in the States until she found the agents. The agents eventually discover that Didi's credit card had been cloned and was being used in Pigeon, Utah. Her lead brought the agents to a doll factory in Pigeon where they met a man who was on the phone to Suspect Zero during the blackout. The name "D. Gibbons" appears on Mark's bulletin board in his flashforward, and it was added to the board in the present time. The FBI continues to refer to the man in the doll factory as "D. Gibbons", and Charlie apparently learned to refer to him by that name in her flashforward.
- Sheriff Keegan (Marina Black) is the Sheriff of the town of Pigeon, Utah, who meets with agents Mark Benford and Demetri Noh following their lead on the flashforward of Didi Gibbons. Keegan informs Demetri that she, like him, didn't experience a flashforward when she blacked out. She explains how she prefers this, as everybody around her is getting too wrapped up in what they saw. Keegan is later killed in the doll factory by the real D. Gibbons after he shoots her. Demetri takes Keegan's death as proof that he will be dead before April 29, 2010, the day seen in the flashforwards.
- Abdi Khalif - (played by Robert Lonzo Thompson as a child, Owiso Odera as an adult). In 1991 in Somalia, he was herding his goats when he saw the crows above him fall from dead from the sky. He followed their path and came across a small town, littered with the bodies of both crows and humans. He then looked up and saw a tower, and a mysterious gas. It is not clear if the gas is emitting from the tower, or not. Speaking to MTV News, executive producer David Goyer revealed that the Somali boy will be reappearing as an adult at some point in the series.
- Gabriel McDow (James Callis) is a former patient of Frost, used for his exceptional memory capabilities as part of an "alpha test" for the blackouts. He becomes more relevant to the plot as he finds Olivia and tries to persuade her that this version of the future is completely different from the one he saw, in which she was married to Lloyd.
- Edward Ned (Keir O'Donnell) is sitting on a bus when he blacks out during the global blackout. After awaking, he calmly reacts as he realizes the bus is underwater and steadily filling up. A young woman is struggling, so Ned soothes her and helps her to escape by breaking open a bus window. Two weeks later, Ned goes to the hospital for his injuries. He reveals his flashforward to Olivia and Bryce - he was walking through a club he always wanted to go into, wearing leather pants, reportedly one of his fears (alongside escalators). He also tells how he was dark-skinned in his vision, instead of his usual paler color. Just as he is taken to theatre, Bryce realizes that Ned has Addison's Disease, a disease where adrenal glands do not produce enough adrenaline - this explains his calmness after discovering the bus he was on was sinking. Olivia refuses to base her treatment of Ned on his flashforward, as she personally is trying to convince herself that they won't come true. However, after Ned's heart rate drops as a result of his illness, Olivia relents and administers the correct treatment. Ned survives the operation, and Olivia and Bryce agree not to let their personal lives affect their work.
- Jeff Slingerland (Callum Keith Rennie) was a teacher of American history at South Fairfax High School. He did not experience a flashforward during the global blackout, and as such, joins the Already Ghosts club, a club which unites everybody who did not experience a vision. Jeff is arrested after the club is infiltrated by Mark Benford, Demetri Noh and Al Gough, where he is the current "Raynaud" of that evening (the person who seems to lead the club, reported to be a different person each night.) He was interrogated for his connections to the attempted assassination of Janis Hawk and the deaths of Ian Rutherford and a number of others.
- Mike Willingham (Mark Famiglietti) makes himself known to Aaron Stark and reveals himself to be colleague of Aaron's deceased daughter, Tracy. Mike reveals to Aaron the circumstances surrounding Tracy's death - they were chasing terrorists when they were shot at by a missile. Whilst Mike escaped, Tracy did not and she was killed in the explosion. Mike found Tracy's body, but later had to leave the scene after being shot at once more. Aaron thanks Mike for offering him closure regarding Tracy's death, as he saw Tracy in his flashforward. However, Aaron later sees Tracy in his apartment.
- Celia Quinones (Lena Georgas) is introduced in the opening scenes of episode seven, walking in the city with her two young sons. A voiceover, read by Al Gough, reveals that Celia did not experience a flashforward during the global blackoutband is subsequently a "ghost". Celia finds a note on her car advertising the Already Ghosts society (Blue Hand Group). Later, in an extended version of Al's flashforward it is revealed that Al had, by April 29, 2010, caused Celia's death, although it remains unexplained. Al's attorney reports that Celia's twin sons will go into foster care after her death. In an attempt to save Celia's life, Al kills himself so that he will be unable to cause her death. Al narrates a letter written to her during the closing scenes of the episode. She was previously referenced in the episode "Black Swan", where Al was seen typing her name into Mosaic. She is run over and almost killed by a former member of the Blue Hand group, who wants fate to take its course as it should. Upon her survival, the attempted murderer states that he did not fail to kill her, the Universe did.
- Maya (Navi Rawat) is introduced as a romantic interest of agent Janis Hawk - this is the first time that Janis's sexuality is revealed. Maya and Janis attend a tae kwon do class together, and after a session in the episode, they go on a date together. Maya reveals she works as a chef and in her flashforward she saw herself wearing a wedding band. When she asks Janis, her date jokes about having a three way with Hillary Clinton and Sarah Palin, instead of telling her the real truth. Janis also tells Maya that her colleagues do not know she is a lesbian due to implied homophobia within the FBI. The following morning, Maya is at Janis's apartment, the pair having spent the night together. She invites Maya to stay in her apartment whilst she herself goes to work. They meet again that night at a gallery, where Maya gives Janis an alarm clock as Janis is always running late. She then reveals that she entered Janis's name into the Mosaic Collective (apparently unaware that Janis is one of the forces behind the website) and now knows about Janis's foreshadowed pregnancy. Maya ponders whether the baby is theirs as a couple, joking about her sexual performance. Janis then tells her that she felt she was doing the pregnancy alone, and subsequently decides to end the relationship.
- Timothy (Gil Bellows) was a window washer who fell from his lift during the blackout, but was miraculously saved from death by a hung safety line. He takes this event as a religious conversion, becoming an evangelist for a "new beginning" in life, creating "Sanctuary", a place of religious discussion and safety.
