= Ryan Wynott =

American actor (born 1999)

- Born: December 6, 1999 (age 26); California U.S.
- Occupation: Actor
- Years active: 2007–2013

Ryan Wynott (born December 6, 1999, in California) is an American actor. He is best known for playing Dylan Simcoe on the television series FlashForward (2009–2010) and as Trip Faraday on The Cape (2011).

== Filmography ==
Year	Film	Role	Notes
2007	The Brothers Solomon	Young Dean Solomon	
2007	Tell Me You Love Me	Joshua Walker	9 episodes
2009	Hank	Henry	
2009	Cold Case	Young Michael	Season 6, episode 18
2009	Regarding: Beauregard	Young Trevor (8 years old)	
2009–2010	FlashForward	Dylan Simcoe	14 episodes
2011	The Cape	Trip Faraday	10 Episodes
2011	Love's Christmas Journey	Christopher Davis	
2012	Grey's Anatomy	Wes Connors	Season 8, Episode 12
