= Barry Shabaka Henley =

American actor

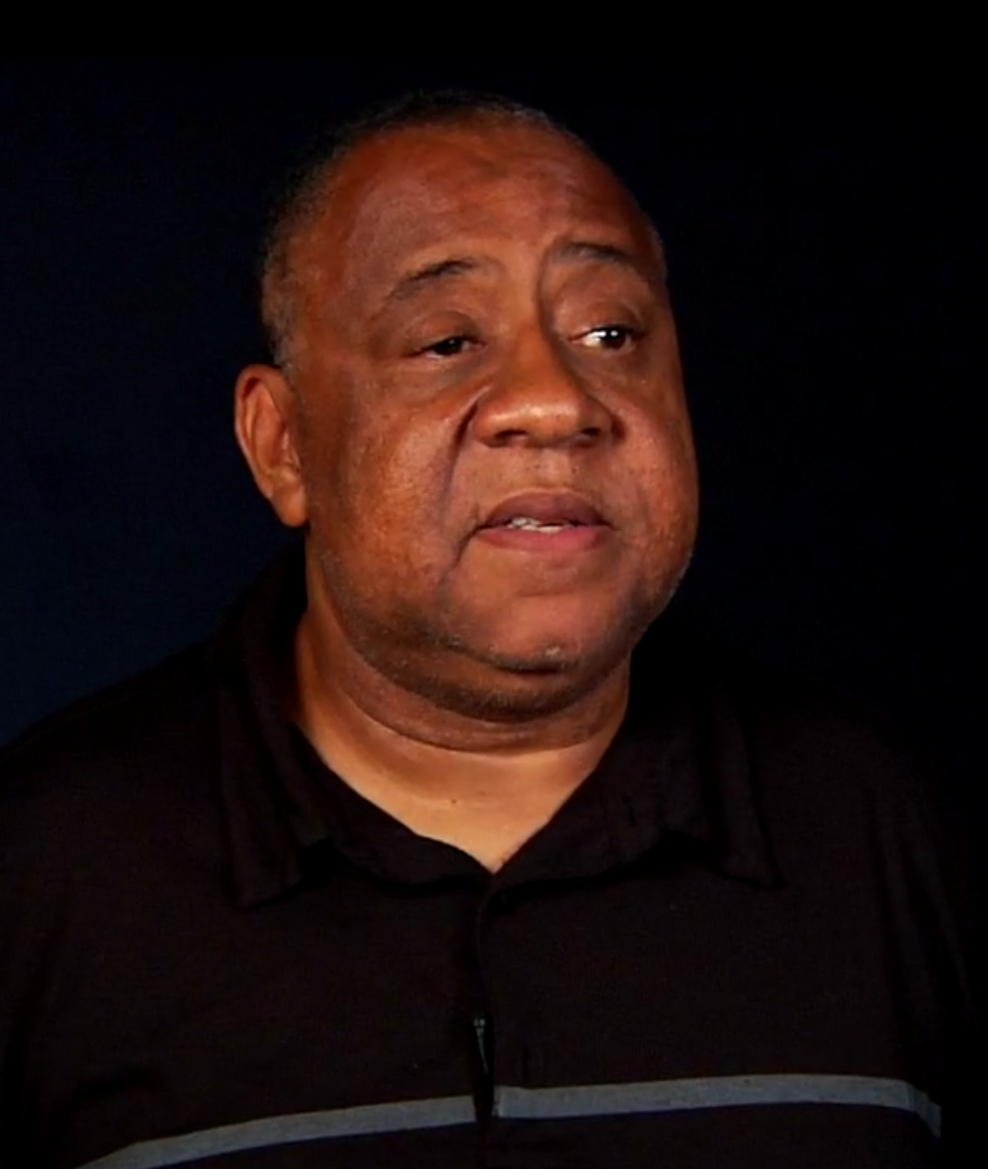
- Henley in 2011
- Born: Barry Joseph Henley; September 15, 1954 (age 72); New Orleans, Louisiana, U.S.
- Occupation: Actor
- Years active: 1988–present

Barry Shabaka Henley (born Barry Joseph Henley; September 15, 1954) is an American character actor. Henley has appeared as a regular in a number of television series, has numerous film credits, and is a fixture in films by director Michael Mann, having worked with the director three times. From 2019 to 2024, he co-starred in the CBS sitcom Bob Hearts Abishola as Uncle Tunde.

His stage name, Shabaka, is taken from a Pharaoh from Egypt's 25th dynasty, who ruled from 721 to 707 BC.

== Early life ==
Henley was born in New Orleans, Louisiana. His mother was a dance teacher, and he often went along to watch recitals. During his childhood his family moved to San Francisco, and he attended the San Francisco Polytechnic High School, where he was taught by Johnny Land. Henley's first audition came at age 17 when he heard a "tip" that the Encore Theatre was looking for a young actor. He was given the script but did not think he was a good fit for the part and determined not to read it. But, Henley has said, "On the bus from 45th and Quintara to Mason and Geary, it hit me...You know what, I guess this guy wants me to memorize this stuff. So I memorized it on the bus." He spent the next several years acting on stage before moving to the screen. His early stage work included appearances with the San Francisco Mime Troupe, which included a performance as "Factwino."

== Career ==
Henley made his first appearance at the age of 37 in the unsold television pilot Clippers.

In Ali, Henley played Herbert Muhammad. In Collateral, he portrayed a sensitive jazz musician living on borrowed time. He played Buddy in the 1998 film How Stella Got Her Groove Back and Pokerface in the 1999 film Life. In 2004, he appeared in Steven Spielberg's The Terminal, playing an airport U.S. Customs Officer. He portrayed Crockett and Tubbs' boss Lieutenant Martin Castillo in the movie version of Miami Vice in 2006. He also appeared in the 2016 film Paterson.

Henley appeared in the television series Robbery Homicide Division and Barbershop. From 2009 to 2010, he played FBI Agent Vreede in the television series FlashForward. In 2010, Henley played Dr. Olson in the season 3 Lie to Me episode "Veronica". In 2011, he appeared as the murderer in the Body of Proof episode "Letting Go" and in 2012 he reunited with Michael Mann for the TV series Luck, playing a parole officer. In 2015, he played a police detective in the Breaking Bad spin-off series Better Call Saul.

In 2019, Henley joined the cast of Agents of S.H.I.E.L.D., part of the Marvel Cinematic Universe franchise, as Marcus Benson.

Henley was a regular cast member on the CBS TV sitcom Bob Hearts Abishola, appearing as Abishola's Uncle Tunde.

As a stage actor, Henley's honors include the Drama Desk, Obie, and Olivier Awards. He was also a member of the West Coast Black Repertory Theatre and the San Francisco Mime Troupe.

== Filmography ==
=== Film ===
Year	Title	Role	Notes
1993	Fear of a Black Hat	Geoffrey Lennox	
1993	What's Love Got to Do with It	El Paso Doctor	
1993	The Thing Called Love	Reverend Raymond	
1994	The Scout	McDermott	
1995	Destiny Turns on the Radio	Dravec	
1995	Lord of Illusions	Dr. Toffler	
1995	Devil in a Blue Dress	Woodcutter	
1998	Fallen	Uniformed Cop	
1998	Bulworth	Man at Frankie's	
1998	How Stella Got Her Groove Back	Buddy	
1998	Rush Hour	Bobby	
1998	Patch Adams	Emmet	
1999	Life	Pokerface	
2001	Ali	Jabir Herbert Muhammad	
2004	The Terminal	Officer Thurman	
2004	Collateral	Daniel	
2005	Four Brothers	Councilman Douglas	
2005	Shackles	Virgil	Direct-to-video
2006	Miami Vice	Castillo	
2009	Horsemen	Tuck	
2009	State of Play	Gene Stavitz	
2009	Streets of Blood	Captain Friendly	Direct-to-video
2010	The Dry Land	Col. Stephen Evans	
2010	Virginia	Willie	
2011	The Big Year	Dr. Neil Kramer	
2012	Stolen	Reginald	
2013	Water & Power	Preacher Broyard	
2013	Carrie	Principal Morton	
2016	Paterson	Doc	
2017	Mad Families	Pops	
2017	Lucky	Joe	
2018	Office Uprising	Clarence	
2018	A Star Is Born	Little Feet	
2019	Dolemite Is My Name	Demond	

=== Television ===
Year	Title	Role	Notes
1991–1992	The Royal Family	Willis Tillis	Recurring role, 8 episodes
1992–1994	Roc	Ernie	Recurring role, 7 episodes
1993	Johnny Bago	Detective Venezia	2 episodes
1994	ER	Detective	1 episode
1995	Married... with Children	Charlie	1 episode
1995	Happily Ever After: Fairy Tales for Every Child	Horrible Looking Giant #1 (voice)	1 episode
1995	The Client	Linton Bell	1 episode
1995; 2004	NYPD Blue	Roger Billings/Archie Day	3 episodes
1996	Malcolm & Eddie	Mr. Derian	1 episode
1996	Sparks	Stan Lawrence	1 episode
1997	Duckman	Additional voices	1 episode
1998	Brooklyn South	Mr. Anders	1 episode
2000	The Steve Harvey Show	Tom Cunningham	1 episode
2000	City of Angels	Delmar Forchette	1 episode
2001	Oz	Lieutenant Schmand	1 episode
2001	Crossing Jordan	Omar Maltese	1 episode
2002	Providence	Mr. Adams	1 episode
2002–2003	Robbery Homicide Division	Sgt. Albert Simms	Main role, 13 episodes
2004	Law & Order: Special Victims Unit	Asante Odufemi	1 episode
2005	Lackawanna Blues	Shakey Winfield	Television film
2005	Grey's Anatomy	Mr. Patterson	1 episode
2005–2006	Close to Home	Detective Lou Drummer	Recurring role, 9 episodes
2005–2006	Barbershop	Eddie	Main role, 10 episodes
2006	Numbers	Coach Grady	1 episode
2007	Hustle	Thomas Jackson	1 episode
2007	Heroes	Detective Bryan Fuller	4 episodes
2009–2010	FlashForward	Agent Shelly Vreede	Recurring role, 13 episodes
2010	The Good Guys	Dr. Vincent Olson	1 episode
2010	Lie to Me	Al Chapman	1 episode
2012	Fairly Legal	Agent Donovan	1 episode
2012	Luck	Parole Officer	4 episodes
2012	Veep	Fast Food Executive	1 episode
2013	Shameless	Judge Glen Aufseeser	Episode: "A Long Way from Home"
2013	Remember Sunday	Baptiste	Television film
2013	The Crazy Ones	Pete	1 episode
2015	Better Call Saul	Detective Sanders	3 episodes
2015	Extant	Senator Gabel	1 episode
2015	Black-ish	T Jackson	1 episode
2015	Unforgettable	Leo Hackett	1 episode
2016	NCIS: New Orleans	Baton Rouge Detective Todd Lamont	1 episode
2017	Elementary	Wendell Hecht	1 episode
2017	NCIS	Earl Goddard	1 episode
2017	Ryan Hansen Solves Crimes on Television	Captain Jackson #3 / Female Captain Jackson #8	2 episodes
2017–2018	Bosch	Terry Drake	Recurring role, 7 episodes
2019	Station 19	Oscar Delgado	1 episode
2019	Agents of S.H.I.E.L.D.	Dr. Marcus Benson	Recurring role, 5 episodes
2019	Black Jesus	Judge Horation Homey	1 episode
2019–2024	Bob Hearts Abishola	Babatunde "Tunde" Olatunji	Main role, 86 episodes
2025	Forever	George	Recurring role
2025	Death by Lightning	Blanche Bruce	Miniseries, 2 episodes
2026	The Comeback	Walter	Recurring role, 6 episodes
