= Genevieve Padalecki =

American actress (born 1981)

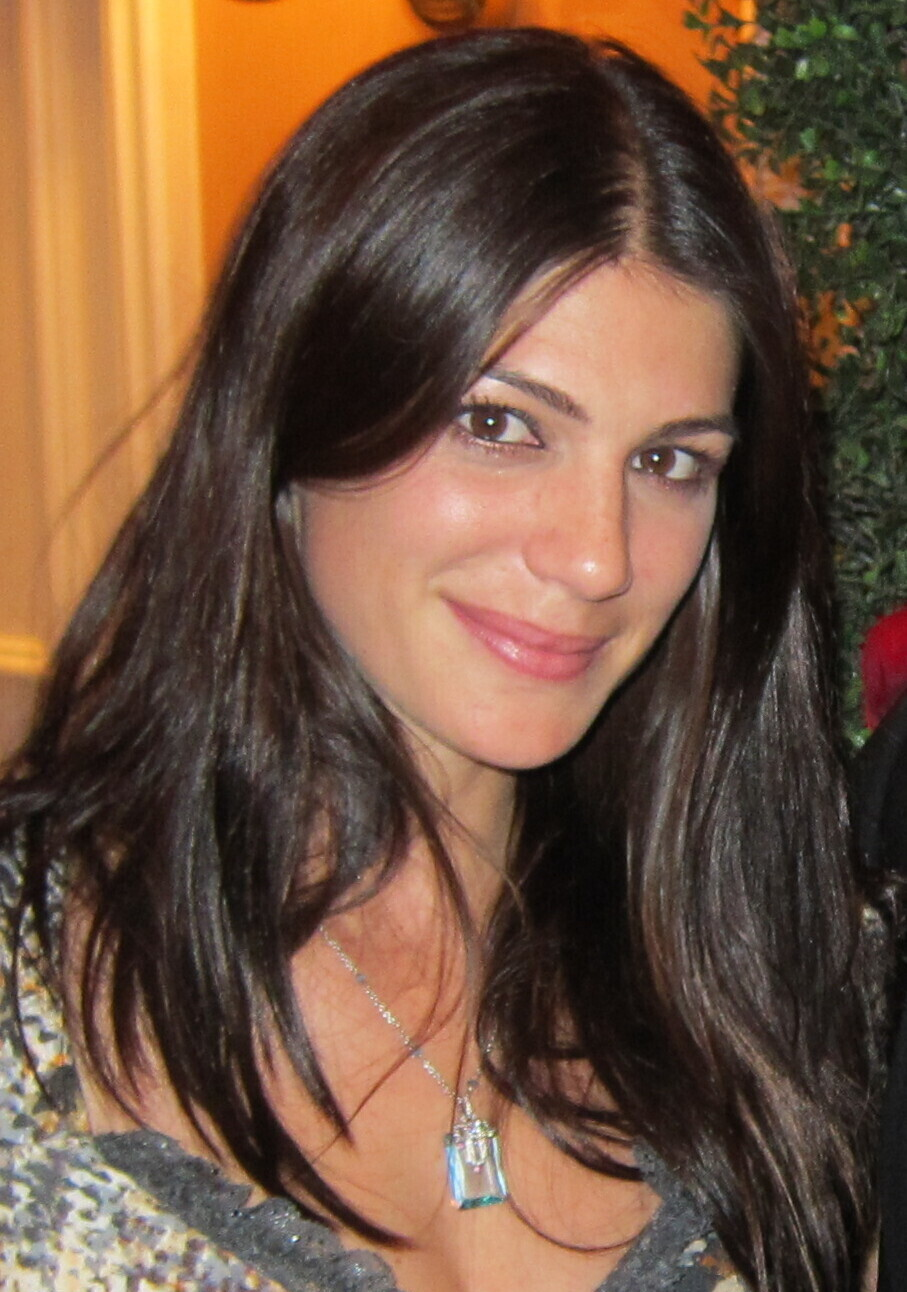
- Padalecki in September 2011
- Born: Genevieve Nicole Cortese; January 8, 1981 (age 45); San Francisco, California, U.S.
- Other names: Genevieve Padalecki; Jennifer Cortese
- Education: Tisch School of the Arts (BA, BFA)
- Occupation: Actress
- Years active: 2004–2012; 2020–present
- Spouse: Jared Padalecki (m. 2010)
- Children: 3

Genevieve Nicole Padalecki (née Cortese; born January 8, 1981) is an American actress. She starred in the television series Wildfire as Kris Furillo and had a recurring role in Supernatural as the demon Ruby. Her film and television appearances were inconsistently credited as either Genevieve Cortese or Jennifer Cortese through to 2010, and has been consistently credited as Genevieve Padalecki since a February 2011 episode of Supernatural.

== Life and career ==
Genevieve Padalecki was born in San Francisco, California. She has two brothers, Johnny and Ben, and a sister, Sarah. At the age of 13, she moved to Montana, and later to Sun Valley, Idaho. She holds a BA in English and a BFA degree in drama from the Tisch School of the Arts, New York University.

Before making her television debut as Kris Furillo, she performed in regional theater productions of A Midsummer Night's Dream, One Flew Over the Cuckoo's Nest, Crimes of the Heart, and Joseph and the Amazing Technicolor Dreamcoat.

In 2008, she was cast to play the recurring role of Ruby (previously played by Katie Cassidy) in Supernatural alongside her future husband, Jared Padalecki.

On September 14, 2020, it was announced that she had been cast in a recurring role in The CW's crime drama series Walker, a reboot of the original television show of Walker, Texas Ranger, to play the role Emily Walker, the late wife of Cordell Walker (who is played by her husband Jared Padalecki). The series premiered on January 21, 2021. The series was cancelled in 2024 after four seasons.

== Personal life ==
She met actor Jared Padalecki during her recurring role as Ruby on Supernatural. She went on to make a guest appearance in the sixth season as a fictionalized version of herself.

In October 2009, Padalecki proposed to her in front of their favorite painting, "Joan of Arc" by French realist Jules Bastien-Lepage, at New York's Metropolitan Museum of Art. The engagement was announced in January 2010. The pair married on February 27, 2010, in Cortese's hometown of Sun Valley, Idaho.

On October 10, 2011, the couple announced that they were expecting their first child together. Their son was born on March 19, 2012. On December 22, 2013, Cortese gave birth to their second son. Their daughter was born on March 17, 2017. The couple resides in Austin, Texas, with their three children.

== Filmography ==
=== Film ===
Year	Title	Role	Notes
2004	Death Valley	Amber	Credited as Genevieve Cortese
2005	Kids in America	Ashley Harris	Credited as Genevieve Cortese
2005	Unraveled		Video short; credited as Jennifer Cortese
2006	Bickford Shmeckler's Cool Ideas	Toga girl	Credited as Jennifer Cortese
2006	Life Is Short	Ashley	Short film, credited as Genevieve Cortese
2007	Salted Nuts	Jen	Credited as Jennifer Cortese
2012	Hated	Veronica	First film credit as Genevieve Padalecki

=== Television ===
Year	Title	Role	Notes
2005	The Dead Zone	Chloe Greeg / Laura Tierney	Episode: "Still Life"; credited as Jennifer Cortese
2005–2008	Wildfire	Kris Furillo	Main cast; credited as Genevieve Cortese
2008–2009; 2011; 2020	Supernatural	Ruby	Recurring role (season 4, credited as Genevieve Cortese); Guest role (two episodes, first TV credit as Genevieve Padalecki)
2009–2010	FlashForward	Tracy Stark	Recurring role; credited as Genevieve Cortese
2021–2024	Walker	Emily Walker	Recurring role (season 1); Guest (4 episodes)
