= List of Bob Hearts Abishola episodes =

Bob Hearts Abishola is an American sitcom television series created by Chuck Lorre, Eddie Gorodetsky, Al Higgins, and Gina Yashere that premiered on CBS on September 23, 2019. It stars Billy Gardell and Folake Olowofoyeku as the respective title characters. In January 2023, the series was renewed for a fifth and final season, which premiered on February 12, 2024.

During the course of the series, 95 episodes of Bob Hearts Abishola aired over five seasons, between September 23, 2019, and May 6, 2024.

== Series overview ==
Season	Episodes	Originally released	
Season	Episodes	First released	Last released
1	20	September 23, 2019	April 13, 2020
2	18	November 16, 2020	May 17, 2021
3	22	September 20, 2021	May 23, 2022
4	22	September 19, 2022	May 22, 2023
5	13	February 12, 2024	May 6, 2024

== Episodes ==
=== Season 1 (2019–20) ===
No. overall	No. in season	Title	Directed by	Written by	Original release date	Prod. code	U.S. viewers (millions)
1	1	"Pilot"	Beth McCarthy-Miller	Chuck Lorre & Eddie Gorodetsky & Al Higgins & Gina Yashere	September 23, 2019	T11.10127	5.89
Bob, a Detroit business owner, suffers a heart attack and is immediately smitten with Abishola, the Nigerian nurse who is treating him when he awakes from surgery.
2	2	"Nigerians Don't Do Useless Things"	Beth McCarthy-Miller	Chuck Lorre & Al Higgins & Gina Yashere	September 30, 2019	T12.16502	5.36
Abishola’s family and friends urge her to consider marrying Bob or at least dating him. Intrigued with the possibility that she could marry into money, Uncle Tunde and Auntie Olu tail Bob as he drives around town. When Bob recognizes them, he follows them back to their apartment; after an uncomfortable conversation there, Abishola agrees to have tea with him. At work, Dottie reminds Bob that this is the 25th anniversary of his father’s heart attack and death on the loading dock. Later, Bob meets Abishola at a park bench outside the hospital. She tells him firmly that this is not a date. Title quotation from: Abishola, to Bob, when he asks her if she has any hobbies.
3	3	"A Bird May Love a Fish"	Beth McCarthy-Miller	Chuck Lorre & Al Higgins & Gina Yashere	October 7, 2019	T12.16503	5.30
Bob asks Goodwin, one of his workers, to teach him Yoruba so that he can ask Abishola to have tea with him again. Kemi spreads gossip, in person and online, that Abishola is in a relationship with Bob. Soon, Abishola's friends and family want to talk to her about it. The pressure causes Abishola to tell Bob that they cannot be together. First Appearance of: Bayo Akinfemi as Goodwin and Anthony Okungbowa as Kofo Title quotation from: Douglas, to Bob, pointing out the glaring differences between his brother and Abishola.
4	4	"Square Hamburger, Round Buns"	Beth McCarthy-Miller	Story by : Chuck Lorre & Al Higgins & Gina Yashere; Teleplay by : Carla Filisha & Gloria Bigelow & Marla DuMott	October 14, 2019	T12.16504	4.87
Following Abishola's rejection, Bob explores the world of online dating, but his first date (Missi Pyle) is way too much to handle. Meanwhile, Aunt Olu tries to set up Abishola with Chukwuemeka (Tony Tambi), a Nigerian friend's son, but Abishola is unimpressed. The episode closes with Bob unexpectedly finding Abishola on their park bench. Abishola seems glad that he showed up. Absent: Maribeth Monroe as Christina, Travis Wolfe Jr. as Dele, Bayo Akinfemi as Goodwin and Anthony Okungbowa as Kofo Title quotation from: Tunde, making a remark about his Wendy's double-baconator burger.
5	5	"Whacking the Mole"	Beth McCarthy-Miller	Story by : Al Higgins & Gina Yashere; Teleplay by : Chuck Lorre & Matt Ross	October 21, 2019	T12.16505	5.27
Abishola is having frequent, recurring dreams of romantic encounters with Bob, to the point that she becomes ill from lack of sleep. Meanwhile, Bob is less than thrilled with the ad campaign pitched by Douglas and Christina but soon realizes they may have a point. Title quotation from: Gloria and Kemi, comparing Abishola's feelings for Bob to the arcade game, saying that she can whack the feelings down but they will just pop back up.
6	6	"Ralph Lauren and Fish"	Beth McCarthy-Miller	Story by : Chuck Lorre & Al Higgins; Teleplay by : David Goetsch & Gina Yashere	October 28, 2019	T12.16506	5.71
On the way home from a dinner date with Abishola, Bob gets a call from Christina: something is wrong with their mother. From the symptoms that Christina describes, Abishola deduces that Dottie is having a stroke. When Bob and Abishola reach the hospital, they find Christina in the waiting room, hopped up on Xanax from her mother's purse. Meanwhile, Douglas gets lost trying to find the waiting room. Absent: Vernee Watson as Gloria Title quotation from: The cologne Bob wore for his date with Abishola, and the food she made him order at the steakhouse.
7	7	"Tough Like a Laundromat Washing Machine"	Beth McCarthy-Miller	Story by : Chuck Lorre & Al Higgins & Gina Yashere; Teleplay by : Matt Ross	November 4, 2019	T12.16507	5.62
Bob hires Abishola to take care of Dottie in his home while she recovers, but Dottie has a hard time dealing with her limitations and takes it out on Abishola. Meanwhile, Bob enlists Kofo and Goodwin to run MaxDot while he gets Dottie settled, but they get carried away and the entire staff goes on strike. Title quotation from: Goodwin, referring to Dottie's health.
8	8	"Useless Potheads"	Beth McCarthy-Miller	Story by : Chuck Lorre & Al Higgins; Teleplay by : Matt Ross & Gina Yashere & Ibet Inyang	November 18, 2019	T12.16508	6.02
Abishola takes care of Dottie while also working at the hospital. When she can't be there, Douglas and Christina are supposed to take over, but they get high instead of taking proper care of their mother. At MaxDot, Goodwin and Kofo close a big deal with a client while Bob is on leave. Title quotation from: Dottie, describing Douglas and Christina to Abishola on the phone.
9	9	"We Were Beggars, Now We Are Choosers"	Beth McCarthy-Miller	Story by : Chuck Lorre & Al Higgins & Gina Yashere; Teleplay by : Matt Ross & Carla Filisha & David Goetsch	November 25, 2019	T12.16509	5.65
Chukwuemeka asks Abishola for a second chance, and she agrees. Tunde dislikes Chukwuemeka, so he tells Bob that Abishola would be better off with him. When Bob tells Abishola that he wants her to be happy, whatever decision she makes, she tells him that she wants a man who will fight for her. Absent: Anthony Okungbowa as Kofo Title quotation from: Olu, telling Tunde that Abishola now has choices for a man in her life.
10	10	"Ice Cream for Breakfast"	Beth McCarthy-Miller	Story by : Chuck Lorre & Al Higgins; Teleplay by : Dave Goetsch & Matt Ross & Gina Yashere	December 9, 2019	T12.16510	5.99
Even though she agreed to give him another chance, Abishola still finds Chukwuemeka unbearable. Encouraged by Tunde, Bob interrupts their dinner date to make a passionate pitch to Abishola. Dottie enjoys Tunde’s cooking and gets a kick out of playing cards with him. Absent: Travis Wolfe Jr. as Dele and Vernee Watson as Gloria Title quotation from: Bob, using a simile to tell Abishola that even though their relationship doesn't make sense, it still could be something good.
11	11	"Splitting the Hairs"	Beth McCarthy-Miller	Story by : Chuck Lorre & Al Higgins & Gloria Bigelow; Teleplay by : Carla Filisha & Ibet Inyang & Marla DuMont	December 16, 2019	T12.16511	6.15
Abishola tells her friends that she wants to pursue Bob. Kemi then feels free to go on a date with Chukwuemeka, even though this makes Abishola uncomfortable. Bob learns that Dottie has not prepared a will, which, in the event of her death, would adversely affect the family business. Abishola and Bob have their first kiss. Absent: Shola Adewusi as Olu, Barry Shabaka Henley as Tunde, Travis Wolfe Jr. as Dele, Bayo Akinfemi as Goodwin and Anthony Okungbowa as Kofo Title quotation from: Kemi, debating whether she lied to Abishola or was just "slow to tell the truth".
12	12	"There's My Nigerians"	Beth McCarthy-Miller	Story by : Chuck Lorre & Al Higgins & Gina Yashere; Teleplay by : Dave Goetsch & Carla Filisha & Matt Ross	January 6, 2020	T12.16512	6.66
When Abishola says that Dottie seems depressed, Bob arranges for two friends from her club, Jen (Wendie Malick) and Trish (Marilu Henner), to pay her a visit. When that backfires, Dottie decides to take Olu and Tunde to the club for lunch. This leads to a discussion about Bob and Abishola's possible wedding, but then Dottie angers her guests by mentioning the need for a prenup. After a night of passion, Chukwuemeka gives Kemi a costly necklace, but when his mother finds out, she makes him ask Kemi to return it. Absent: Bayo Akinfemi as Goodwin and Anthony Okungbowa as Kofo Title quotation from: Dottie, when she hears Tunde and Olu pull up to take her to the club.
13	13	"The Canadians of Africa"	Beth McCarthy-Miller	Story by : Chuck Lorre & Al Higgins & Gina Yashere; Teleplay by : Dave Goetsch & Carla Filisha & Matt Ross	January 20, 2020	T12.16513	6.50
Dele confesses to Bob that he wants to be a dance choreographer, not the doctor that his mother demands he become. When she sees Dele’s dancing video, Abishola decides that he will go to medical school while studying dance on the side, and when he finishes, she will decide which career he should pursue. Kemi enjoys passionate nights with Chukwuemeka, despite his mother’s sleeping presence in the next bedroom. Title quotation from: Kofo, describing women from Ghana after he and Goodwin suggest Bob will have to move on from Abishola.
14	14	"Full-Frontal Dottie"	Beth McCarthy-Miller	Story by : Chuck Lorre & Al Higgins & Gina Yashere; Teleplay by : Dave Goetsch & Matt Ross	February 3, 2020	T12.16514	5.85
When Dottie succeeds in moving her foot for the first time since her stroke, she decides to return to work. On her first day, she cancels a new product that her children added during her absence, and she insults Bob by saying he is incapable of making sound business decisions. Irate, Bob responds by quitting, getting drunk, and driving a forklift through the warehouse. Absent: Shola Adewusi as Olu, Barry Shabaka Henley as Tunde, and Travis Wolfe Jr. as Dele Title quotation from: Douglas, bemoaning Dottie's belligerence upon her return to work.
15	15	"Black Ice"	Beth McCarthy-Miller	Story by : Chuck Lorre & Al Higgins & Gina Yashere; Teleplay by : Ibet Inyang	February 10, 2020	T12.16515	6.00
During Valentine's Day dinner, Bob professes his love to Abishola. She does not return his "I love you" due to cultural customs that discourage showing affection. Later, she tells Bob that she is committed to their relationship. At MaxDot, Goodwin tries to keep Kofo from riding his motor scooter because he has promised relatives that he would keep his younger cousin safe. Absent: Travis Wolfe Jr. as Dele Title quotation from: Kofo and Goodwin, telling Bob and Douglas about Michigan driving hazards that don't exist in Nigeria.
16	16	"Where's Your Other Wives, Tunde?"	Beth McCarthy-Miller	Story by : Chuck Lorre; Teleplay by : Al Higgins	February 17, 2020	T12.16516	6.12
As Dottie mends fences with Olu and Tunde, Bob tells the three of them that he and Abishola don't yet have "a real relationship." When an angry Abishola asks him to explain, he tells her that, among other things, they haven't had sexual relations. She replies that she has never had sex outside of marriage. After Bob sulks and drinks all day, Abishola calls him late at night to say she isn't ruling out the possibility of intimacy in the near future. Title quotation from: Dottie, asking Olu and Tunde about polygamy in Nigeria.
17	17	"A Big, White Thumb"	Beth McCarthy-Miller	Story by : Chuck Lorre & Gina Yashere & Carla Filisha; Teleplay by : Matt Ross	March 9, 2020	T12.16517	5.81
During a dinner with her family, Abishola invites Bob to church. While explaining why he isn't crazy about going, Bob inadvertently insults their religious beliefs. Later, he apologizes and agrees to accompany Abishola, saying, "If something's important to you, it's important to me." After an uncomfortable experience during the church service, Abishola wonders how their relationship will ever last. Bob tells her that even though he's unsure about his belief in God, he does believe in miracles, citing their relationship as an example. Absent: Bayo Akinfemi as Goodwin and Anthony Okungbowa as Kofo Title quotation from: Tunde, guessing why Abishola has not yet brought Bob to church: "You're afraid that he will stick out like a big, white thumb."
18	18	"Sock Wife!"	Beth McCarthy-Miller	Story by : Chuck Lorre & Al Higgins & Gloria Bigelow; Teleplay by : Matt Ross & Dave Goetsch & Gina Yashere	March 16, 2020	T12.16518	6.89
After discovering that Bob's ex-wife Lorraine (Nicole Sullivan) has been admitted to the hospital, Abishola goes to see her. With Abishola's help, Bob prays for his ex-wife's happiness and begins to let go of his animosity toward her. The exes share a hug that Kemi witnesses, and Abishola grows concerned that Lorraine still has feelings for Bob. Meanwhile, Christina recruits Kofo to help with online branding, and the two find themselves drawn to one another. Absent: Christine Ebersole as Dottie and Travis Wolfe Jr. as Dele Title quotation from: Kemi, out of breath from running, tries to tell Abishola that Lorraine is a patient in their hospital.
19	19	"Angry, Happy, Same Face"	Beth McCarthy-Miller	Story by : Chuck Lorre & Gina Yashere & Ibet Inyang; Teleplay by : Matt Ross & Carla Filisha & Marla DuMont	April 6, 2020	T12.16519	6.73
When Bob's ex-wife Lorraine reconciles with Dottie and starts hanging out at Bob's house, Abishola takes exception. Christina continues to pursue Kofo, who resists her advances because he fears losing his job if the relationship ends badly. This forces Douglas and Bob, who know their sister's romantic history, to take drastic measures. Absent: Travis Wolfe Jr. as Dele Title quotation from: Kemi, explaining to Gloria how difficult it is to decipher Abishola's emotions.
20	20	"Randy's a Wrangler"	Beth McCarthy-Miller	Story by : Chuck Lorre & Al Higgins & Gina Yashere; Teleplay by : Matt Ross & Dave Goetsch & Carla Filisha	April 13, 2020	T12.16520	6.81
During physical therapy, Dottie meets fellow stroke victim Hank (John Ratzenberger) and his caretaker (Leonard Roberts). Even though Hank and Dottie enjoy each other's company, Dottie fears that she isn't ready to start a new relationship. Bob and Douglas video-chat with Christina, who has been away for a week, enrolled in a mental health and wellness program on a ranch. Christina tells them that she has found a new love. End of Season 1. Title quotation from: Christina, describing her new crush, a ranch hand.

=== Season 2 (2020–21) ===
No. overall	No. in season	Title	Directed by	Written by	Original release date	Prod. code	U.S. viewers (millions)
21	1	"On a Dead Guy's Bench"	Beth McCarthy-Miller	Story by : Chuck Lorre & Al Higgins & Nathan Chetty; Teleplay by : Gina Yashere & Matt Ross & Ibet Inyang	November 16, 2020	T12.16701	5.22
With negotiating assistance from Tunde, Bob purchases an engagement ring for Abishola. Despite Bob's plea to keep his upcoming proposal a secret, Tunde tells Olu, who then tells Abishola. Abishola tells Bob that she knows about the ring, but there are too many problems in the way of their getting married: she must divorce her Nigerian husband and get her village's approval of Bob. Bob briefly considers staying with Abishola while unwed, but soon he decides that he wants to marry her, no matter the difficulties to overcome. Title quotation from: Bob, referring to his and Abishola's favorite bench after she notices the dedication plaque on the back of it.
22	2	"Paris Is for Lovers, Not Mothers"	Beth McCarthy-Miller	Story by : Chuck Lorre & Gina Yashere & Carla Filisha; Teleplay by : Dave Goetsch & Gloria Bigelow & Marla DuMont	November 23, 2020	T12.16702	4.90
Bob plans a fancy dinner with Abishola to celebrate their engagement, but they wind up at his favorite coney stand. Douglas asks Dottie for a promotion and a raise, but Dottie will agree only if he "earns it" by working on the shop floor. Kemi resents that Chukwuemeka plans to take his mother to Paris instead of her. Olu gives Kemi some romantic advice. Absent: Travis Wolfe Jr. as Dele Title quotation from: Kemi, lamenting that Chukwuemeka is taking his mother to Paris instead of her.
23	3	"Straight Outta Lagos"	Nikki Lorre	Story by : Al Higgins & Gina Yashere & Matt Ross; Teleplay by : Carla Filisha & Dave Goetsch & Nathan Chetty	November 30, 2020	T12.16703	4.92
Bob invites Abishola to a gala dinner where he will be presented with the Michigan Undergarment Manufacturers Association's Businessman of the Year award. After his first week on the MaxDot shop floor, Douglas invites Goodwin and Kofo out for Friday evening drinks at an expensive club. Abishola suggests to Bob that they spend the night together. Absent: Travis Wolfe Jr. as Dele Title quotation from: Bob, as he introduces Abishola to some big-wigs at the awards dinner.
24	4	"Camp Bananas"	Beth McCarthy-Miller	Story by : Al Higgins & Gina Yashere & Matt Ross; Teleplay by : Ibet Inyang & Marla DuMont & Gloria Bigelow	December 7, 2020	T12.16704	5.28
Following Bob's less-than-stellar stress test, Abishola meets with the Wheeler family to discuss changes to make to improve his health. Bob and Abishola take a day off work to de-stress, but they have vastly different ideas on how to spend the time. At MaxDot, Christina takes over in Bob's absence and becomes a tyrant. Gloria takes over Dottie's physical therapy, and the two women share fond memories of growing up in Detroit. Absent: Travis Wolfe Jr. as Dele Title quotation from: Dottie, sarcastically referring to the mental health ranch that Christina attended.
25	5	"Sleeping Next to an Old Boat"	Beth McCarthy-Miller	Story by : Al Higgins & Gina Yashere & Carla Filisha; Teleplay by : Matt Ross & Nathan Chetty & Ibet Inyang	December 14, 2020	T12.16705	4.85
When Bob and Dele clean out the garage, Bob tells him to take anything he likes. One item is a Roomba, which Dele gives to Aunt Olu and Uncle Tunde. At first, they are delighted with its cleaning prowess, but soon Olu feels upstaged. Abishola returns the items to Bob, saying that Dele should not be given things that he hasn't worked to obtain. She assumes that all his life, everything has been handed to Bob. Dottie sets her straight, giving Abishola a new appreciation for Bob. Absent: Bayo Akinfemi as Goodwin and Anthony Okungbowa as Kofo Title quotation from: Olu, describing Tunde's snoring as he sleeps.
26	6	"A Tight Ass is a Wonderful Thing"	Beth McCarthy-Miller	Story by : Chuck Lorre & Gina Yashere & Marla DuMont; Teleplay by : Matt Ross & Dave Goetsch & Carla Filisha	January 4, 2021	T12.16708	5.63
After a week of letting Kemi accompany them on their commute, Bob tells Abishola that Kemi's constant chatter annoys him. Abishola shares this with Kemi, which precipitates a misunderstanding with Bob due to cultural differences. At MaxDot, Goodwin discovers that Douglas has made some disastrous mistakes; he also learns that Dottie has a dishonest but effective solution for cleaning up her son's messes. Absent: Travis Wolfe Jr. as Dele Title quotation from: Kofo, assuring Goodwin that his reputation as a strict manager is a positive attribute.
27	7	"The Wrong Adebambo"	Kristy Cecil	Story by : Al Higgins & Matt Ross & Gloria Bigelow; Teleplay by : Dave Goetsch & Gina Yashere & Marla DuMont	January 18, 2021	T12.16706	5.55
After eight years in Nigeria, Abishola's husband Tayo returns to Detroit for business and to visit the family. Bob sees this as a perfect opportunity for Abishola to ask for a divorce. Abishola gets angry when Tayo brags about his career and wealth, and when he declares that she would be a fool not to return to live with him in Nigeria. Bob reminds Abishola that she's not the same person Tayo left eight years ago. Abishola then asks Tayo for a divorce, but he insists he will never grant her one. Title quotation from: Bob, telling Abishola that when he looked up Tayo online, he found a funk bass player with the same name.
28	8	"Honest Yak Prices"	Beth McCarthy-Miller	Story by : Al Higgins & Matt Ross & Ibet Inyang; Teleplay by : Gina Yashere & Nathan Chetty & Gloria Bigelow	January 25, 2021	T12.16707	5.96
After Abishola's pastor and her mother side with Tayo in his refusal to grant a divorce, Bob decides to play hardball and hires powerful attorney Arnie Goldfischer (Joel Brooks). Tayo counters by announcing he'll hire an equally powerful attorney whom Arnie knows well. Faced with the almost impossible task of getting Tayo to change his mind, Bob and Abishola resolve to "just be happy" and live together. However, after seeing Bob and Abishola dance to a song Bob had chosen specially for his wife-to-be, Olu and Tunde accost Tayo outside the church and shame him into accepting a divorce. Title quotation from: Ebunoluwa (Abishola's mother), pondering if her new wig might be made of yak hair.
29	9	"Tunde the Boy King"	Beth McCarthy-Miller	Story by : Al Higgins & Gina Yashere & Carla Filisha; Teleplay by : Matt Ross & Nathan Chetty & Ibet Inyang	February 8, 2021	T12.16709	5.54
At MaxDot, Douglas brings some fun to the shop floor with dancing and games, which gives the workers a morale boost and surprisingly increases productivity – including his own. Christina and Abishola bond over their difficulties relating to other people. Absent: Travis Wolfe Jr. as Dele and Vernee Watson as Gloria Title quotation from: Olu, telling Christina that Tunde was an Egyptian boy king in a past life.
30	10	"The Cheerleader Leader"	Beth McCarthy-Miller	Story by : Al Higgins & Gina Yashere & Marla DuMont; Teleplay by : Matt Ross & Nathan Chetty & Ibet Inyang	February 22, 2021	T12.16710	5.56
While picking up his son from school, Tayo is dismayed to see Dele working with his dance troupe. He disapproves of this activity as "embarrassing" and "unmanly." Abishola discovers that Tayo has asked Dele to live with him in Nigeria for the summer, and that Dele wants to go. Bob enlists Goodwin and Kofo in his quest to understand soccer. In return, Goodwin and Kofo try to enjoy an NFL game; they become enthused only when they notice a Nigerian-born player, Emmanuel Ogbah, on one of the teams. Title quotation from: Tayo's sneering nickname for Dele, who is the choreographer of his own dance group.
31	11	"I Did Not Raise Him to be a Teenager"	Beth McCarthy-Miller	Story by : Al Higgins & Gina Yashere & Marla DuMont; Teleplay by : Matt Ross & Nathan Chetty & Ibet Inyang	March 8, 2021	T12.16711	5.20
When Bob arrives at Abishola's apartment for dinner, he finds that she is still upset about Dele going to Nigeria. At work, Abishola's friends give her advice about handling a teenager. Finally, Abishola relents and allows Dele to go to Nigeria for the summer, albeit with a few ground rules. Title quotation from: Abishola, reacting when Gloria says Dele is just being a teenager.
32	12	"We Don't Rat on Family"	Beth McCarthy-Miller	Story by : Al Higgins & Gina Yashere & Matt Ross; Teleplay by : Nathan Chetty & Gloria Bigelow & Carla Filisha	March 15, 2021	T12.16712	5.10
Bob learns that in Nigerian culture, a wedding joins two families, not just the couple. Tunde, as the representative of Abishola's family, sets out to learn as much as he can about Bob's family and his past, including why his first marriage failed. Bob videochats with Abishola's mother who, after a brief discussion, surprisingly says she likes him. Absent: Travis Wolfe Jr. as Dele Title quotation from: Dottie, after learning that Tunde wants to dig up Wheeler family secrets.
33	13	"A Big African Bassoon"	Beth McCarthy-Miller	Story by : Al Higgins & Gloria Bigelow & Dave Pilson; Teleplay by : Gina Yashere & Ibet Inyang & Marla DuMont	April 12, 2021	T12.16713	4.74
With Gloria on vacation for two weeks, Abishola takes over as Charge Nurse. Unfortunately, her leadership style alienates the nurses, who rebel against her. Bob learns that Abishola will never stop working toward the next stage of her career, which disappoints him, as he dreams of buying a boat when he retires. After her stint as Charge Nurse ends, Abishola tells Bob that she has learned something important: every higher nursing position takes her farther from caring for patients, so she has decided to become a doctor. Title quotation from: A nurse complaining to Kemi about Abishola's strict leadership.
34	14	"A Tough Old Bird"	Beth McCarthy-Miller	Story by : Al Higgins & Gina Yashere & Nathan Chetty; Teleplay by : Matt Ross & Carla Filisha & Marla DuMont	April 19, 2021	T12.16714	4.93
Chukwuemeka and Kemi have parted ways because his mother, Ogechi, insists on grandchildren but Kemi is past childbearing age. Broken-hearted, Kemi acts out in a surprising way that requires help from Bob and Abishola. Afterward, she and Ogechi reach an understanding: Kemi will continue to date Chukwuemeka, while she and Ogechi look for a suitable woman to marry him and bear his children. Absent: Travis Wolfe Jr. as Dele, Bayo Akinfemi as Goodwin and Anthony Okungbowa as Kofo Title quotation from: Bob, explaining to Chukwuemeka that Kemi is strong enough to get over their breakup.
35	15	"TLC: Tunde's Loving Care"	Beth McCarthy-Miller	Story by : Al Higgins & Gina Yashere & Nathan Chetty; Teleplay by : Gina Yashere & Ibet Inyang & Marla DuMont	April 26, 2021	T12.16715	4.69
When she learns that Gloria graduated medical school but was unable to become a doctor, Abishola's respect for her supervisor increases. Tunde displays his skills as a repairman, first on Bob's dishwasher, and then at MaxDot. Title quotation from: Tunde, offering his services and wisdom to Bob when Bob's dishwasher breaks down.
36	16	"Sights and Bites"	Beth McCarthy-Miller	Story by : Al Higgins & Gina Yashere & Ibet Inyang; Teleplay by : Matt Ross & Carla Filisha & Nathan Chetty	May 3, 2021	T12.16716	4.91
When Abishola worries about Dele's activities before his summer trip to Nigeria, Bob suggests putting a tracker in his phone. The tracker enables Abishola to obsess over her son's every move; an innocent flirtation causes her to consider cancelling the trip. Meanwhile, Bob researches Nigeria, with help from Kofo and Goodwin, to create a "sights and bites" guide for Dele to take on his trip. Title quotation from: Bob's title for the guide to Nigerian scenic locations and restaurants that he makes for Dele.
37	17	"The Devil's Taste Buds"	Beth McCarthy-Miller	Story by : Al Higgins & Gina Yashere & Matt Ross; Teleplay by : Carla Filisha & Marla Dumont & Gloria Bigelow	May 10, 2021	T12.16717	4.90
Gloria and Kemi invite Abishola on a girls' night out, but instead, they stay to party at Bob's house. When Dele calls his mother from Nigeria, she is tipsy, which his father Tayo notices. Tayo decides that it would be better for Dele to stay permanently in Nigeria with him. Olu and Tunde rent Dele's room to a young Nigerian woman, Morenike. Title quotation from: Olu, conversing with Tunde about Morenike's affinity for extremely spicy food.
38	18	"God Accepts Venmo"	Beth McCarthy-Miller	Story by : Al Higgins & Gina Yashere & Chuck Lorre; Teleplay by : Matt Ross & Nathan Chetty & Ibet Inyang	May 17, 2021	T12.16718	5.39
With their busy schedules, Bob and Abishola decide the best time to get married is in three weeks. Pastor Balogun insists that the two must go through two months of premarital counseling to get married in the church, but Bob changes his mind with a generous donation. Tayo refuses to send Dele home for the wedding, saying he wants his son to stay permanently with him in Nigeria. Abishola, Bob, Olu and Tunde take a plane to Nigeria, intending to bring Dele home with them. End of Season 2. Title quotation from: Pastor Balogun, after Bob tries to make a donation with a check.

=== Season 3 (2021–22) ===
No. overall	No. in season	Title	Directed by	Written by	Original release date	Prod. code	U.S. viewers (millions)
39	1	"Welcome to Lagos"	Beth McCarthy-Miller	Story by : Al Higgins & Gina Yashere & Matt Ross; Teleplay by : Nathan Chetty & Carla Filisha & Ibet Inyang Beneche	September 20, 2021	T12.17301	5.43
After Bob, Abishola, Tunde and Olu arrive in Nigeria, Abishola takes Dele to her mother's home. Bob is left to ride around the city with an angry Tayo, who prefers that Dele stay with him. Abishola and Bob decide to get married in Nigeria so that Dele and Abishola's mother, Ebunoluwa, can attend. Title quotation from: Tunde, making a somewhat sarcastic comment to an overwhelmed Bob upon the group's arrival in Nigeria.
40	2	"Bowango"	Beth McCarthy-Miller	Story by : Al Higgins & Gina Yashere & Marla DuMont; Teleplay by : Matt Ross & Gloria Bigelow & Dave Pilson	September 27, 2021	T12.17302	5.49
As the wedding approaches, Bob learns he must fulfill a wish list for Abishola's father as a way of earning the right to marry her, per Nigerian tradition. Meanwhile, with the same Nigerian tradition dictating that a wedding is more about the bride's mother, Ebunoluwa goes overboard trying to take all the credit for Abishola's success and her groom-to-be, refusing to acknowledge her sister Olu's contributions. In the end, Bob and Abishola are wed in a beautiful ceremony. Title quotation from: Bob, misinterpreting Tunde's "bow and go" command as a Nigerian word.
41	3	"Dud"	Beth McCarthy-Miller	Story by : Al Higgins & Gina Yashere & Carla Filisha; Teleplay by : Nathan Chetty & Ibet Inyang Beneche & Marla DuMont	October 4, 2021	T12.17303	5.21
Bob tries to make things as easy as possible for Abishola to move into his home, including agreeing to her choices of uncomfortable furniture and removing the TV from the living room. The two host a wedding party for those who could not go to Nigeria, including Goodwin, Kofo, and Gloria, but the party ends up being a bust. Abishola is disappointed to find Bob and several guests watching TV in the garage. Absent: Travis Wolfe Jr. as Dele Title quotation from: Dottie, describing the party thrown by Bob and Abishola.
42	4	"Old Strokey"	Beth McCarthy-Miller	Story by : Al Higgins & Gina Yashere & Gloria Bigelow; Teleplay by : Matt Ross & Dave Pilson & Jamarcus Turner	October 11, 2021	T12.17304	5.12
When Bob and Abishola complain that she intrudes on their private time, Dottie feels that she is a burden. Piloting her wheelchair, she slips out to visit Olu and Tunde, who do their best to lift her spirits. Kofo also feels unwanted in his cousin's home after he overhears Goodwin and his wife complaining about him. After Dottie returns home, Douglas is shocked to see her stand up from her wheelchair to reach something in the refrigerator. Absent: Travis Wolfe Jr. as Dele Title quotation from:
43	5	"Greasy Badge of Honor"	Beth McCarthy-Miller	Story by : Al Higgins & Gina Yashere & Nathan Chetty; Teleplay by : Carla Filisha & Ibet Inyang Beneche & Marla DuMont	October 18, 2021	T12.17305	5.05
Dottie and Christina take Abishola on a "girls' day" that includes shopping and a spa, which causes her to fall behind in her studies. Kofo proposes opening a MaxDot factory outlet store, which piques Bob's interest. Concerned that Kofo aims to take his place, Goodwin tries to sabotage his cousin's presentation, but Kofo is one critical step ahead of him. Title quotation from: Goodwin, explaining his plan to distract Bob with donuts during Kofo's presentation.
44	6	"The Devil's Throuple"	Beth McCarthy-Miller	Story by : Al Higgins & Gina Yashere & Dave Pilson; Teleplay by : Nathan Chetty & Gloria Bigelow & Jamarcus Turner	November 1, 2021	T12.17306	4.98
Over Kemi's objections, Ogechi decides that Morenike will be the perfect person to have Chukwuemeka's children. Kemi worries that Morenike will displace her in Chukwuemeka's affections. She gets revenge by telling a horrified Chukwuemeka of her plans to "move on" and then she does so, with a handsome hospital tech. No longer in MaxDot management and without his company car, Douglas is left to take the bus everywhere, but he meets a pretty bus driver who finds him charming. Absent: Travis Wolfe Jr. as Dele
45	7	"Fumble in the Dark"	Beth McCarthy-Miller	Story by : Al Higgins & Gina Yashere & Gloria Bigelow; Teleplay by : Matt Ross & Ibet Inyang Beneche & Dave Pilson	November 8, 2021	T12.17307	4.96
Morenike tells Kemi that she is willing to marry Chukwuemeka to please her family, who don't know that she is gay. Because homosexuality is illegal in Nigeria, Abishola advises Morenike to stay closeted for her own safety. At MaxDot, Bob hijacks Christina's marketing idea, which is the last straw for her, so she leaves the company. When Goodwin is not promoted to Christina's job, he considers quitting, too. Absent: Travis Wolfe Jr. as Dele Title quotation from: Kemi, talking about touching other girls when she was in an all-girls boarding school.
46	8	"Light Duty"	Beth McCarthy-Miller	Story by : Al Higgins & Gina Yashere & Dave Pilson; Teleplay by : Carla Filisha & Marla Dumont & Jamarcus Turner	November 29, 2021	T12.17308	4.88
Upset over Kofo's promotion, Goodwin has a panic attack and collapses on the shop floor. Later, Bob informs him that only the two of them know how to do every job at MaxDot; therefore, he plans to appoint Goodwin to run the company when he retires. Kemi and Abishola convince Christina to see a Yoruba priest in order to find the source of her problemns. Absent: Travis Wolfe Jr. as Dele Title quotation from: Bob, informing Goodwin that he must be placed on light duty work following his panic attack.
47	9	"I'm Not Edsel"	Beth McCarthy-Miller	Story by : Al Higgins & Gina Yashere & Kelly Farrell; Teleplay by : Nathan Chetty & Gloria Bigelow & Dave Pilson	December 6, 2021	T12.17309	5.08
Bob brings Abishola to Uncle Tunde and Auntie Olu's apartment, where he has a surprise for her: he has flown Dele home from Nigeria for a visit. Abishola's elation is short-lived when she sees her mother, Ebunoluwa, has come, too. Soon, Ebunoluwa is criticizing everything and everyone, even mocking Bob for having only one factory. Later, Abishola tells her mother to stop insulting Bob, which leads Ebun to decamp to Olu and Tunde's apartment. Title quotation from: Bob. While the family visits the Henry Ford Museum, Ebunoluwa compares him to the Ford family's least successful son.
48	10	"Tunde123"	Bayo Akinfemi	Story by : Al Higgins & Gina Yashere & Carla Filisha; Teleplay by : Matt Ross & Ibet Inyang Beneche & Jamarcus Turner	January 3, 2022	T12.17310	5.21
Abishola discovers that Dele's father, Tayo, has given him a credit card, which she then destroys. Bob tries to forge a closer bond with Dele. Olu and Tunde, unhappy that Ebunoluwa has moved into their apartment, scheme to get Abishola and her mother to make up, hoping that Ebun will move back into Bob's house. Bob suggests that Abishola not be as stern with Dele as her mother was with her. Title quotation from: Ebunoluwa, who easily figures out Tunde's internet password.
49	11	"Cats in a Bathtub"	Beth McCarthy-Miller	Story by : Al Higgins & Gina Yashere & Gloria Bigelow; Teleplay by : Nathan Chetty & Marla Dumont & Dave Pilson	January 17, 2022	T12.17311	5.49
When Bob accidentally reveals that Morenike is gay, the news spreads through the church community and leads to an "intervention" by the homophobic church elders. Bob is crestfallen when Morenike tells him that nothing he can say or do will undo the damage he has caused. Because her parents in Nigeria won't answer her phone calls, Olu and Tunde decide that Morenike will stay with them. Later, they enter church services arm in arm with her to show their solidarity as a family. To impress Olivia the bus driver, Douglas claims to be a low-wage warehouse worker. Absent: Maribeth Monroe as Christina Title quotation from:
50	12	"Your Beans are Flatlining"	Kristy Cecil	Story by : Al Higgins & Gina Yashere & Ibet Inyang Beneche; Teleplay by : Matt Ross & Carla Filisha & Jamarcus Turner	January 24, 2022	T12.17312	5.86
Ebun turns up the pressure on Abishola, scolding her for her “low” MCAT score and claiming that she doesn't cook often enough for Bob. As a result, Abishola is plagued by nightmares. During physical therapy, Dottie shows Abishola that her recovery has progressed to the point that she can stand. Bob and Abishola decide that they must send Ebun back to Nigeria. Afterward, Abishola has her first peaceful sleep in a long time. Absent: Maribeth Monroe as Christina Title quotation from: Gloria's warning cry in Abishola's frenetic dream.
51	13	"One Man, No Baby"	Rhiannon O'Harra	Story by : Al Higgins & Gina Yashere & Marla Dumont; Teleplay by : Nathan Chetty & Gloria Bigelow & Dave Pilson	February 28, 2022	T12.17313	5.50
Bob and Abishola feel trapped sharing their home with their overbearing mothers. Bob asks them to give him and Abishola one night of privacy a week. Ebun assumes that they are trying to have a baby, and the news spreads quickly through the Nigerian community and to MaxDot. Abishola insists that she is not pregnant, but no one listens. Bob begins to wonder if having a baby might not be a bad idea. When she realizes that Bob is not opposed to it, Abishola tells him that she is no longer “a hard no.” Title quotation from: Tunde, declaring his excitement for the prospect of a new baby in the family: “I have always wanted to change a diaper ever since I saw the movie ‘Three Men and a Baby.’ I was one man with no baby.”
52	14	"Every Subpoena is a Tiny Hug"	Beth McCarthy-Miller	Story by : Al Higgins & Gina Yashere & Jamarcus Turner; Teleplay by : Carla Filisha & Ibet Inyang Beneche & Marla Dumont	March 7, 2022	T12.17314	5.71
Christina has found a job at a small competitor, Toesey Woesies. When she refuses to sign a legal document that her mother has prepared, Dottie initiates a lawsuit. After Olu and Ebun butt heads in a fierce argument, Olu convinces Ebun to join her for a relaxing day. This leads to the two sisters sharing a moment of understanding and empathy. Title quotation from: Christina, who thanks her mother for suing her: “This lawsuit shows you respect my talents. … Every subpoena is a tiny hug.”
53	15	"Compress to Impress"	Beth McCarthy-Miller	Story by : Chuck Lorre & Al Higgins & Gina Yashere; Teleplay by : Matt Ross & Gloria Bigelow & Dave Pilson	March 14, 2022	T12.17315	5.71
Noting that MaxDot's last advertising campaign was 30 years ago and involved Dottie posing in a leotard, Kofo suggests that they make a commercial. Filming it is fraught with difficulties, from Abishola's self-consciousness over her accent to the estrangement between Christina and Dottie. After some soul baring and rewrites, the commercial is filmed with the Wheelers, Abishola’s family, MaxDot workers, and hospital nurses performing a musical number: “MaxDot socks, socks that rock.”
54	16	"I'll Sleep When I'm Dead"	Beth McCarthy-Miller	Story by : Al Higgins & Gina Yashere & Ibet Inyang Beneche; Teleplay by : Nathan Chetty & Carla Filisha & Marla Dumont	March 21, 2022	T12.17316	5.40
As a result of the infomercial, MaxDot is overwhelmed with orders. What's good for business is not good for Bob: in addition to working crushing hours and wrangling with overseas suppliers, he becomes a mean boss who scares the floor staff into putting in huge amounts of overtime. While Abishola’s family is proud of Bob’s work ethic, Abishola is unhappy that she sees so little of him. Eventually, the couple find a moment to comfort each other, just in time to grapple with the news that Ebun is looking into dual citizenship so that she can stay with them permanently. .
55	17	"Inappropriate Nakedness"	Beth McCarthy-Miller	Story by : Al Higgins & Gina Yashere & Jamarcus Turner; Teleplay by : Matt Ross & Ibet Inyang Beneche & Dave Pilson	March 28, 2022	T12.17317	5.13
To get Ebun to return to Nigeria, Kemi suggests that Abishola make "the ghost call": calling her mother in the guise of her late grandmother to order her to return home. During the phone call, Abishola is surprised and moved when Ebun talks of her loveless marriage. Ebun must decide between returning to Nigeria or remaining in Detroit. While Tunde and Dele are painting a bedroom, Tunde educates Dele on the history of rap music. Title quotation from: Kemi, to Abishola, listing one of many ways that she could get her mother to leave.
56	18	"Greasy Underdog"	Beth McCarthy-Miller	Story by : Al Higgins & Gina Yashere & Carla Filisha; Teleplay by : Nathan Chetty & Gloria Bigelow & Marla DuMont	April 18, 2022	T12.17318	4.97
When Bob and Abishola take Kemi and Chukwuemeka on a dinner date to Bob's favorite hot dog stand, they are shocked to see Morenike working there. Her family in Nigeria disowned her after learning that she is gay, so she had to find a job while still going to school. Bob asks Chukwuemeka to hire Morenike as a pharmacy tech. Title quotation from: Bob, over Kemi's objections to eating at the hot dog stand: "[Abishola] gave that greasy underdog a chance and fell in love."
57	19	"Who Raised You"	Beth McCarthy-Miller	Story by : Al Higgins & Gina Yashere & Nathan Chetty; Teleplay by : Matt Ross & Ibet Inyang Beneche & Jamarcus Turner	May 2, 2022	T12.17319	5.40
Douglas decides to introduce his girlfriend Olivia to his extended family. At dinner, she charms everyone, until she inadvertently offends Dottie. Christina tells Douglas that if he wants Olivia, he will have to fight for her. At the hospital, Gloria informs Abishola and Kemi that her husband has spent all their savings, so she cannot retire anytime soon. Title quotation from: Olivia, while teasing Douglas about his messy habits.
58	20	"Wrangling a Greased Pig"	Beth McCarthy-Miller	Story by : Al Higgins & Gina Yashere & Carla Filisha; Teleplay by : Matt Ross & Gloria Bigelow & Dave Pilson	May 9, 2022	T12.17320	5.14
While Chukwuemeka is away, his mother, Ogechi, falls in the bathtub and breaks her hip. Dele is in Detroit on school break, so Abishola takes him to observe Ogechi’s hip replacement surgery; his reaction makes her realize that he may never become a doctor. After surgery, Kemi takes care of Ogechi, and surprisingly, the former antagonists begin to enjoy one another’s company.
59	21	"A Little Slap and Tickle"	Beth McCarthy-Miller	Story by : Al Higgins & Gina Yashere & Marla DuMont; Teleplay by : Carla Filisha & Ibet Inyang Beneche & Jamarcus Turner	May 16, 2022	T12.17321	5.33
With Dele's medical career over before it started, the family discusses new career plans for him: software designer? lawyer? politician? engineer, like his father? Upset at the plans made for him without his input, Dele runs away to his aunt Christina’s apartment. When his mother arrives, Dele stands up to her, demanding that the family stop making plans for him. Abishola agrees to give him a break. Title quotation from: Dottie, telling Bob why she made herself an online dating profile: "I'm in it only for..."
60	22	"Beard In Her Pulpit"	Beth McCarthy-Miller	Story by : Al Higgins & Gina Yashere & Matt Ross; Teleplay by : Nathan Chetty & Gloria Bigelow & Marla DuMont	May 23, 2022	T12.17322	5.70
The church gets a charming new leader, Pastor Joseph Falade, who charms Abishola's mother Ebun as well. At MaxDot, Dottie gives bonuses to upper management, including Kofo. Although he is not part of management, Goodwin protests that he deserves a bonus for his hard work. Feeling overlooked and unappreciated, he applies for a job at MaxDot competitor Toesey Woesies. End of Season 3. Title quotation from: Kemi, suggesting that the pastor is doing more than flirting with Abishola's mother

=== Season 4 (2022–23) ===
No. overall	No. in season	Title	Directed by	Written by	Original release date	Prod. code	U.S. viewers (millions)
61	1	"Touched by a Holy Hand"	Beth McCarthy-Miller	Story by : Al Higgins & Gina Yashere & Matt Ross; Teleplay by : Carla Filisha & Nathan Chetty & Ibet Inyang Beneche	September 19, 2022	T12.17801	4.44
Abishola and Kemi try and fail to stop the budding romance between Ebunoluwa and Pastor Falade. Through blackmail, Ogechi gets to run the potluck luncheon; puts her son on the board of deacons; and arranges for Tunde to become head deacon. Goodwin leaves MaxDot for a better job at competitor Toesey Woesies. Dottie declares that Bob will take on Goodwin’s duties, as he has always been MaxDot’s workhorse. Taken aback, Bob walks out and heads off on a long drive. Title quotation from: Ogechi's spiteful description of Ebun's flirtation with Pastor Falade: "I have no doubt that she has been touched by a holy hand."
62	2	"Bibles to Brothels"	Beth McCarthy-Miller	Story by : Al Higgins & Gina Yashere & Marla DuMont; Teleplay by : Gloria Bigelow & Dave Pilson & Jamarcus Turner	September 26, 2022	T12.17802	4.73
While Bob drives aimlessly and ponders his future, his deceased father, Max, appears to him. Max admits that he worked 24/7, so he never saw his children, and that he drank heavily to fill the void in his life. Bob decides that he will not make the mistake of giving his life to his job. At Toesey Woesies, Christina is forced to lay off Goodwin just as he has settled into his new office. Bob finds a solution to his problem: he makes Goodwin president of MaxDot, and himself the CEO. Title quotation from: Bob, telling the vision of his late father that he was such a good salesman he could sell Bibles to brothels.
63	3	"Americans and Their Dreams"	Beth McCarthy-Miller	Story by : Chuck Lorre & Gina Yashere & Matt Ross; Teleplay by : Carla Filisha & Ibet Inyang Beneche & Sam Mohamed Elhindi	October 3, 2022	T12.17803	5.08
Bob purchases a luxury speedboat which he parks in his driveway; he invites everyone to join him there for cocktails. At MaxDot, President Goodwin is interviewed by a Lagos-based podcaster who lionizes him as “a real-life business tycoon” who saved a “failing Detroit company.” Although they agree that they complement each other at work, Goodwin secretly wants Dottie to retire to Florida ASAP, while Dottie plots to take back control of the family business. Title quotation from: Tunde's disgusted sotto voce response when Bob happily talks about following his dreams.
64	4	"Inner Boss Bitch"	Beth McCarthy-Miller	Story by : Chuck Lorre & Gina Yashere & Matt Ross; Teleplay by : Carla Filisha & Dave Pilson & Jamarcus Turner	October 10, 2022	T12.17804	4.79
While thriving at Toesey Woesies, Christina becomes mentor to new employee Jared (Adhir Kalyan). Jared double-crosses her and gets her fired for sexual coercion. After a day of fishing with Tunde in the new boat, Bob realizes what will make him truly happy: going back to work at MaxDot.
65	5	"Kicked Outta the Dele Club"	Beth McCarthy-Miller	Story by : Chuck Lorre & Gina Yashere & Matt Ross; Teleplay by : Nathan Chetty & Gloria Bigelow & Marla DuMont	October 17, 2022	T12.17805	5.07
Bob takes Dele to get a new hairstyle. Furious, Abishola demands that he change it, but Dele refuses, so she grounds him. Later, Abishola remembers that as a teenager, she got herself into a dangerous situation, but she was too frightened of her mother to ask for her help. She decides that she does not want that kind of relationship with her son. Christina’s plea to be reinstated in her old job at MaxDot is refused, but then she is hired as the company’s janitor.
66	6	"Two Rusty Tractors"	Beth McCarthy-Miller	Story by : Chuck Lorre & Gina Yashere & Matt Ross; Teleplay by : Nathan Chetty & Ibet Inyang Beneche & Sam Mohamed Elhindi	October 24, 2022	T12.17806	5.45
A sudden shortage of supplies requires Bob and Goodwin to drive to Baltimore to purchase a shipping container full of socks. On the way back, Bob proposes to Goodwin that they set up a manufacturing division of MaxDot, so that the company can avoid future supply problems by becoming self-sustaining. Abishola is dismayed to discover that Bob's plan requires a huge loan, so he must use the Wheeler mansion as collateral.
67	7	"Your Father's Kingdom"	Beth McCarthy-Miller	Story by : Chuck Lorre & Gina Yashere & Carla Filisha; Teleplay by : Matt Ross & Marla DuMont & Dave Pilson	November 14, 2022	T12.17807	4.59
Abishola is angry at Bob for incurring an expensive long-term lease in his plan to create MaxDot’s manufacturing division. Chukwuemeka finds that spending time and energy on Kemi is affecting his work as a pharmacist. Title quotation from: Goodwin to his family, describing the warehouse that he and Bob just rented.
68	8	"Estée Lauder and Goat Meat"	Beth McCarthy-Miller	Story by : Chuck Lorre & Gina Yashere & Matt Ross; Teleplay by : Nathan Chetty & Ibet Inyang Beneche & Gloria Bigelow	November 21, 2022	T12.17808	5.13
Bob hires Uncle Tunde to refinish the factory floors, but Tunde overdoes the project, incurring extra expenses and delays. Bob fires him, but due to family opposition to his decision, he rehires Tunde and promotes him to "senior consultant" to the renovation project. Abishola’s mother, Ebunoluwa, discovers that her husband in Nigeria has dumped her. Title quotation from: Tunde to Olu, to note how much he loves the smell of his wife's perfume AND her delicious home cooking.
69	9	"Idle Nigerians"	Beth McCarthy-Miller	Story by : Chuck Lorre & Gina Yashere & Matt Ross; Teleplay by : Carla Filisha & Marla DuMont & Jamarcus Turner	December 5, 2022	T12.17809	4.89
The factory renovation hits a few snags, including a stubborn drain problem and a large bill to fix the roof. Due to a nurses’ strike, Abishola cannot work, and she finds it difficult to remain idle. Worried about the factory’s cash flow, Abishola asks Dottie for help. The two of them decide to show their support for Bob and his new venture by loaning him their savings. Title quotation from: Kemi to Gloria, making an observation about some of the striking nurses: "Idle Nigerians go crazy."
70	10	"An Afro and a Peugeot"	Beth McCarthy-Miller	Story by : Chuck Lorre & Gina Yashere & Matt Ross; Teleplay by : Nathan Chetty & Ibet Inyang Beneche & Sam Mohamed Elhindi	January 16, 2023	T12.17810	4.72
Bob discovers that Dele does not need driving lessons, as his father taught him to drive in Nigeria. Abishola buys Dele a used car, which he is allowed to use only to chauffeur his grandmothers around town. When Douglas makes a colossal accounting blunder, Christina tells him how to fix it. At first, Douglas takes credit for her idea. Later, after he admits that she was behind it, Goodwin invites her to join them for some celebratory Scotch. Title quotation from: Tunde, reminiscing about his first French car and the wind blowing through his hair as he drove.
71	11	"Twerk O' Clock"	Beth McCarthy-Miller	Story by : Gina Yashere & Jesse Jensen; Teleplay by : Gloria Bigelow & Marla DuMont & Dave Pilson	January 23, 2023	T12.17811	5.84
When Bob and Dottie go on a business trip to Kuala Lumpur, they run into MaxDot's longtime sock supplier, Wati. Dottie convinces Wati to move to Detroit to work for MaxDot Manufacturing. Abishola joins Olu and Morenike at a drag brunch. Title quotation from: The phrase used at Cheeseburger Sally's drag brunch, to encourage customers to join in the dancing.
72	12	"My Successful Lawyer Son"	Beth McCarthy-Miller	Story by : Matt Ross & Gina Yashere & Carla Filisha; Teleplay by : Nathan Chetty & Ibet Inyang Beneche & Jamarcus Turner	February 6, 2023	T12.17812	5.78
When Kemi's adult son, Fenmbi, comes to visit, she radically changes her behavior. She even denies her relationship with Chukwuemeka, lest Fenmbi disapprove. Chukwuemeka gives her an ultimatum: either she acknowledges their relationship or he will leave her. At MaxDot, Bob’s family finally accepts that he is CEO. Title quotation from: The way Kemi repeatedly introduces her son, Fenmbi, when he comes from Nigeria to visit her.
73	13	"Happy People Are Lazy"	Beth McCarthy-Miller	Story by : Gina Yashere & Matt Ross & Jesse Jensen; Teleplay by : Carla Filisha & Dave Pilson & Sam Mohamed Elhindi	February 13, 2023	T12.17813	5.63
Abishola postpones taking the MCAT exam, instead spending the day thinking as she watches the machines at a laundromat. Olu and Tunde find her and explain why she feels strange and disconnected: she is happy, thanks to Bob. Goodwin decides to make Kofo and Christina compete to create a new marketing plan. Title quotation from: Abishola, telling Bob why she has never believed that people can be both happy and successful.
74	14	"Put that Toe on Ice"	Beth McCarthy-Miller	Story by : Matt Ross & Gina Yashere & Nathan Chetty; Teleplay by : Gloria Bigelow & Marla DuMont & Jamarcus Turner	February 27, 2023	T12.17814	5.56
Due to overwork, both Abishola and Bob fall ill with the flu. Goodwin chooses Christina's marketing plan over Kofo’s and then appoints Kofo to assist her. Fed up with Goodwin’s rude treatment, Kofo leaves MaxDot headquarters to transfer to the manufacturing plant.
75	15	"Every Character Is the Villain"	Beth McCarthy-Miller	Story by : Gina Yashere & Matt Ross & Gloria Bigelow; Teleplay by : Ibet Inyang Beneche & Dave Pilson & Sam Mohamed Elhindi	March 13, 2023	T12.17815	4.99
After Kofo leaves MaxDot marketing to work at the new factory, Bob tries to reconcile him and Goodwin "for the good of the company." The plan backfires, leaving Bob and Abishola with an unwelcome houseguest. Kemi and Abishola are involved in a minor quarrel.
76	16	"Mmm, Fresh Baked Sock!"	Beth McCarthy-Miller	Story by : Chuck Lorre & Matt Ross & Gina Yashere; Teleplay by : Carla Filisha & Marla DuMont & Jamarcus Turner	March 20, 2023	T12.17816	5.09
Ebunowuola’s cousin Yeti has passed away, leaving Abishola to struggle with memories of this cruel aunt whom she loathed. At the funeral, Abishola comes to realize that she and Auntie Yeti suffered similar devastating life experiences, which helps her understand the reasons behind her aunt’s crusty personality. At MaxDot Manufacturing, Bob works to adjust the settings on the new sock ovens, aided by Ebun. She praises him for his work ethic and the long hours he puts in to "build our empire." Title quotation from: Christina expressing glee over the unveiling of that first product from MaxDot Manufacturing.
77	17	"I'll Never Play Banjo Again"	Beth McCarthy-Miller	Story by : Chuck Lorre & Gina Yashere & Matt Ross; Teleplay by : Nathan Chetty & Ibet Inyang Beneche & Dave Pilson	April 10, 2023	T12.17817	4.55
After Gloria talks about her cold and distant father, who died of cancer, Abishola decides to share a few personal memories with Dele. When Douglas suffers a severe hand injury at MaxDot Manufacturing, Bob rushes him to the hospital for surgery. Title quotation from: Douglas, bemoaning the end of his nonexistent musical career, due to his mangled hand.
78	18	"A Hundred CCs of Handsome"	Beth McCarthy-Miller	Story by : Matt Ross & Gina Yashere & Sam Mohamed Elhindi; Teleplay by : Carla Filisha & Gloria Bigelow & Marla DuMont	April 17, 2023	T12.17818	4.49
Bob encourages Chukwuemeka in his plan to propose to Kemi. Kemi, fearing that Chukwuemeka deserves a better wife than herself, turns him down. Bob, Abishola, and most of the hospital staff conspire to help Chukwuemeka stage another proposal. Kofo moves into an apartment in Olu and Tunde's building, where he receives an overly warm welcome. Title quotation from: Bob, describing Chukwuemeka, as he wheels him into the cardiac reception area on a gurney to propose to Kemi.
79	19	"Keep That Under Your Gele"	Beth McCarthy-Miller	Story by : Gina Yashere & Matt Ross & Gloria Bigelow; Teleplay by : Ibet Inyang Beneche & Dave Pilson & Jamarcus Turner	May 1, 2023	T12.17819	4.76
Everyone but Bob is happy that Dottie is going with them to church. As Bob can't hide his feelings from her, Dottie is offended, so she moves in with Christina. Though Christina is initially happy to have her mom there, Dottie quickly wears out her welcome. Elsewhere, Kofo is enjoying his new apartment until his landlord, Tunde, repeatedly shows up uninvited. Soon Tunde is joined by Bob and then Goodwin, and Kofo is left wondering if he can ever live in peace. Title quotation from: Bob, after he spills a bit of gossip to Abishola
80	20	"The Genius Who Fell Out of My Womb"	Beth McCarthy-Miller	Story by : Matt Ross & Gina Yashere & Jamarcus Turner; Teleplay by : Nathan Chetty & Carla Filisha & Sam Mohamed Elhindi	May 8, 2023	T12.17820	4.41
Bob and Abishola take Dele to visit Bob's alma mater, Southern Michigan University. Abishola is sure that the place is not worth visiting. After they walk around the campus, she softens a bit: she now says that while Dele is still going to Harvard, she thinks Bob got a good education here. Back at home, Wati from Malaysia joins the management of MaxDot Manufacturing. Goodwin realizes that Wati's bottom-line approach is similar to his own: to streamline the factory staff, beginning with Tunde. Title quotation from: Abishola, describing Dele's birth.
81	21	"Take Two Yellows and Go to Bed"	Beth McCarthy-Miller	Story by : Gina Yashere & Matt Ross & Nathan Chetty; Teleplay by : Gloria Bigelow & Marla DuMont & Dave Pilson	May 15, 2023	T12.17821	4.35
Bob throws a lavish party to celebrate the official opening of the MaxDot Manufacturing division. Goodwin and newcomer Wati agree that Bob coddles his workers, although Goodwin defends Bob as a good man. Abishola doubts that Christina can take proper care of Dottie, which infuriates her. When Bob and his mother come back tipsy from lunch, Christina orders Dottie to take her medicine and go to bed. The tirade impresses Abishola, who decides that Christina may be able to handle Dottie after all. Title quotation from: Christina, upon seeing her mother tipsy.
82	22	"Uncharted Waters of Mediocrity"	Beth McCarthy-Miller	Story by : Matt Ross & Gina Yashere; Teleplay by : Jamarcus Turner & Sam Mohamed Elhindi	May 22, 2023	T12.17822	4.77
Waiting for the decision on Abishola's application to Johns Hopkins University School of Medicine is stressful for both Bob and Abishola. Bob worries about running MaxDot Manufacturing from afar, if he has to move to Baltimore. When the decision arrives from Johns Hopkins, Bob and Abishola resolve to plan their next move. End of Season 4. Title quotation from: Kemi, describing where they will all be if Abishola is not accepted into JHU.

=== Season 5 (2024) ===
No. overall	No. in season	Title	Directed by	Written by	Original release date	Prod. code	U.S. viewers (millions)
83	1	"The Dead Eyes of a Respectful Son"	Beth McCarthy-Miller	Story by : Gina Yashere & Marla DuMont; Teleplay by : Matt Ross & Ibet Inyang Beneche	February 12, 2024	T12.18502	5.21
Dele confesses to his mother that he never sent his application to Harvard. Instead, he applied to the dance program at Juilliard. Furious, Abishola kicks him out for defying her. Dele goes to stay with Olu and Tunde. When Olu finds Dele weeping over his estrangement from his mom, she tells him that he has the intelligence and perseverance to achieve his goals. Eventually, Abishola decides to support her son. When Dele shows the family some of his more spectacular dance moves, everyone is impressed--although Abishola says she wants him to minor in dentistry once he's enrolled in Juilliard. Title quotation from: Abishola and Ebun, regarding a young relative who was shipped off to Nigeria and broken as described, leading to him becoming an accountant.
84	2	"Kill the Cat"	Beth McCarthy-Miller	Story by : Chuck Lorre & Gina Yashere; Teleplay by : Matt Ross & Carla Filisha	February 19, 2024	T12.18501	4.81
Tunde is in a car accident. He tells the family that he swerved to avoid running over a cat and hit a telephone pole. At dinner, Tunde insists that he does not need glasses until Olu sends him a text that he cannot read without them. He then admits that the DMV took away his driver's license because he's had three car accidents (all involving cats in the street). Later, Tunde admits to Bob that there was no cat involved in his accidents, that he got confused and hit the gas instead of the brake. Now he must face decline as an aging man. Title quotation from: Bob, telling Tunde that it's better to run over a cat than to crash his car because "there's only one you -- there's lots of cats!"
85	3	"The Devil's Hot Tub"	Beth McCarthy-Miller	Story by : Chuck Lorre & Gina Yashere; Teleplay by : Dave Pilson & Sam Mohamed Elhindi	February 26, 2024	T12.18503	4.68
Worried about the age difference between herself and her Chukwuemeka, Kemi goes for advice to Bob ("because you are much older than Abishola"). Bob tells her that even if Chukwuemeka has never seen her without makeup or her wig, he loves her, and she should go ahead and marry him. Kemi then takes a risk and reveals her true grey-haired self to Chukwuemeka. He tells her that he loves her just as she is. Back at MaxDot, the factory workers strike for higher pay. Dottie retires so that Bob now has the money to raise wages and end the strike. Title quotation from: Kemi, who says that Abishola used this term in referring to Las Vegas (where Kemi plans to hold the wedding).
86	4	"The Heart Attack Boys"	Phill Lewis	Story by : Gina Yashere & Marla DuMont; Teleplay by : Carla Filisha & Kelly Farrell	March 4, 2024	T12.18504	4.68
Christina tells Abishola that she plans to become pregnant and wants her help through the IVF process. Abishola tells Bob, who doubts that his sister could be a good parent, but he decides to support her decision. When Christina tells her mother, Dottie is delighted, but soon she takes over ("We're gonna be a great mom"). Separately, Abishola and Bob begin to think about having a baby, too.
87	5	"Tayo Time"	Phill Lewis	Story by : Matt Ross & Gina Yashere; Teleplay by : Carla Filisha & Opey Olagbaju	March 4, 2024	T12.18505	4.45
After 12 years in Nigeria, Tayo has moved to Detroit to take a promotion at his firm. Everyone is happy to see him except for Bob and Abishola. Bob's idea of "rubbing their happiness in his face" leads only to embarrassment. Kemi's international gossip network informs her that Tayo applied for the promotion only after his wife left him -- for his brother. Olu and Tunde turn down Tayo's rental application for their building, saying, "We are on Team Bob," but when Tayo offers a year's rent in advance, they decide to reconsider.
88	6	"A Tablespoon of Dad"	Phill Lewis	Story by : Matt Ross & Gina Yashere; Teleplay by : Ibet Inyang Beneche & Jesse Jensen	March 11, 2024	T12.18506	4.30
Now officially retired, Dottie packs up her office at MaxDot, including the urn that contains her husband Max's ashes. As president of "MaxDot 2.0," Goodwin decides that Kofo and Douglas will compete for the vacant office, but they reach an understanding that frustrates his plan. At home, Dottie places Max's urn in the living room, which upsets Abishola. Bob notes that Dottie went against her husband's wishes by not scattering his ashes. He disposes of some of them in a tavern that Max loved. Dottie accepts this gesture as honoring Max, and then she sings a love song to her husband's memory. Title quotation from: Bob, who tells his mother that he has tucked "a tablespoon of Dad" into Max's favorite booth.
89	7	"Worth the Cooties"	Rhiannon O'Harra	Story by : Gina Yashere & Jesse Jensen; Teleplay by : Matt Ross & Marla DuMont	March 18, 2024	T12.18507	3.73
Christina tries to get Abishola and Dottie to join her in a pre-pregnancy workout, but they are not interested. Instead, Dottie takes Abishola to an estate sale. Once home, Dottie discovers some prime marijuana in one of her purchases. They get high, and Dottie confesses that she fears being alone, which touches Abishola. Later, Abishola tells Bob that they should spend more time with his mother. Title quotation from: Abishola, who is at first wary of the estate sale but then decides that a $20 silver tray "is worth the cooties."
90	8	"My Michelle Obama"	Nikki Lorre	Story by : Matt Ross & Gina Yashere; Teleplay by : Sam Mohamed Elhindi & Opey Alagbaju	March 25, 2024	T12.18508	4.27
Ebun and Olu clash in a bitter rivalry over preparing meals for the family and for church. Abishola and Bob are stuck in the middle of the quarrel and try to keep the peace, even if it means having to eat two dinners in one night. Tunde is appointed deacon at church. He is so delighted with his new role (“I am Number Two to the Pastor’s Number One”) that he buys himself a new suit, so as to look the part. However, he quickly finds that being a deacon is basically meaningless. Ebun and Olu reconcile and become joint matriarchs of the kitchen. Title quotation from: Tunde. As they prepare to go to church, Tunde kisses Olu's hand and refers to her as "My Michelle Obama."
91	9	"Sad Cupcakes"	Nikki Lorre	Story by : Gina Yashere & Kelly Farrell; Teleplay by : Ibet Inyang Beneche & Dave Pilson	April 1, 2024	T12.18509	4.17
Bob doesn't want to sell MaxDot, despite a munificent offer and enthusiastic support from Christina, Douglas, and Goodwin. Bob talks with his dead father, Max, who helps him work through his fears about selling the company, leading him to change his mind. At the hospital, Abishola and Gloria snipe at each other after cutbacks in the nursing staff cause extra work for everyone.
92	10	"Diamonds Are Made to Sparkle"	Kristy Cecil	Story by : Gina Yashere & Carla Filisha & Marla DuMont; Teleplay by : Matt Ross & Ibet Inyang Beneche & Sam Mohamed Elhindi	April 15, 2024	T12.18510	4.23
Bob and Goodwin negotiate with a Japanese company for the sale of MaxDot, but they end up refusing their generous offer because the prospective purchaser wants to fire the MaxDot employees. Goodwin finds another buyer who will keep MaxDot going -- himself. Ebun annoys Bob by bragging to her friends that the family is about to become filthy rich. Abishola splurges on some expensive items at her mom's urging. Title quotation from: Ebun, while encouraging her daughter to be the outwardly wealthy Abishola she wants the world to see and envy.
93	11	"These Giants Are Flexible"	Kristy Cecil	Story by : Gina Yashere & Matt Ross; Teleplay by : Dave Pilson & Opey Olagbaju	April 22, 2024	T12.18511	4.09
Bob and Abishola travel to New York City for Dele's audition at Juilliard. Dele is thrilled to meet his "cool uncle," Abishola's brother, Ade, who is a musician. Title quotation from: Abishola. Seeing other performers warming up before their auditions, Abishola tells Dele to stretch because "these giants are flexible."
94	12	"Olu! I Popped!"	Bayo Akinfemi	Story by : Gina Yashere & Carla Filisha & Marla DuMont; Teleplay by : Matt Ross & Sam Mohamed Elhindi & Opey Alagbaju	April 29, 2024	T12.18512	4.25
As the Las Vegas wedding of Kemi and Chukwuemeka approaches, Chukwuemeka's mother, Ogechi, suffers a heart attack. Instead of postponing their wedding until she recovers, Kemi finds another option. This episode features a tune by Fela Kuti. Title quotation from: Kemi. After Olu zips Kemi into the too-tight bodice of her wedding dress, the zipper gives way.
95	13	"Find Your Bench"	Rhiannon O'Hara	Story by : Chuck Lorre & Gina Yashere & Al Higgins; Teleplay by : Matt Ross & Dave Pilson & Marla DuMont	May 6, 2024	T12.18513	4.86
It's seven years later, and the characters' futures are revealed. For the first time in years, Bob and Abishola sit on “their” bench outside the hospital, where Bob decides on the subject of the book he wants to write: in the midst of our busy lives, we all need a place where we can pause and reflect. Title quotation from: Bob. This will be the title of his book.

== Ratings ==
=== Season 1 ===
Viewership and ratings per episode of List of Bob Hearts Abishola episodes
No.	Title	Air date	Rating/share (18–49)	Viewers (millions)	DVR (18–49)	DVR viewers (millions)	Total (18–49)	Total viewers (millions)
1	"Pilot"	September 23, 2019	0.9/4	5.89	0.3	1.56	1.2	7.45
2	"Nigerians Don't Do Useless Things"	September 30, 2019	0.7/3	5.36	0.2	1.50	0.9	6.87
3	"A Bird May Love A Fish"	October 7, 2019	0.7/3	5.30	0.3	1.44	1.0	6.74
4	"Square Hamburger, Round Buns"	October 14, 2019	0.7/3	4.87	0.2	1.51	0.9	6.38
5	"Whacking the Mole"	October 21, 2019	0.7/4	5.27	—N/a	1.43	—N/a	6.70
6	"Ralph Lauren and Fish"	October 28, 2019	0.8/4	5.71	0.3	1.54	1.1	7.25
7	"Tough Like a Laundromat Washing Machine"	November 4, 2019	0.7/3	5.62	0.3	1.51	1.0	7.14
8	"Useless Potheads"	November 18, 2019	0.8/4	6.02	—N/a	1.60	—N/a	7.62
9	"We Were Beggars, Now We Are Choosers"	November 25, 2019	0.7/3	5.65	0.3	1.72	1.0	7.37
10	"Ice Cream for Breakfast"	December 9, 2019	0.7/3	5.99	0.3	1.57	1.0	7.56
11	"Splitting the Hairs"	December 16, 2019	0.7/3	6.15	0.3	1.67	1.0	7.81
12	"There's My Nigerians"	January 6, 2020	0.8/4	6.66	—N/a	1.59	—N/a	8.25
13	"The Canadians of Africa"	January 20, 2020	0.7/3	6.50	—N/a	1.60	—N/a	8.10
14	"Full-Frontal Dottie"	February 3, 2020	0.7/3	5.85	0.3	1.67	1.0	7.52
15	"Black Ice"	February 10, 2020	0.7/3	6.00	0.3	1.66	1.0	7.67
16	"Where's Your Other Wives, Tunde?"	February 17, 2020	0.7/3	6.12	0.3	1.60	1.0	7.73
17	"A Big, White Thumb"	March 9, 2020	0.7/4	5.81	0.3	1.71	1.0	7.52
18	"Sock Wife!"	March 16, 2020	0.9/4	6.89	0.3	1.68	1.2	8.57
19	"Angry, Happy, Same Face"	April 6, 2020	0.8/4	6.73	0.3	1.47	1.1	8.20
20	"Randy's a Wrangler"	April 13, 2020	0.8/4	6.81	—N/a	1.43	—N/a	8.24

=== Season 2 ===
Viewership and ratings per episode of List of Bob Hearts Abishola episodes
No.	Title	Air date	Rating (18–49)	Viewers (millions)	DVR (18–49)	DVR viewers (millions)	Total (18–49)	Total viewers (millions)
1	"On a Dead Guy's Bench"	November 16, 2020	0.7	5.22	0.2	1.50	0.9	6.72
2	"Paris is for Lovers, Not Mothers"	November 23, 2020	0.6	4.90	—N/a	—N/a	—N/a	—N/a
3	"Straight Outta Lagos"	November 30, 2020	0.6	4.92	0.2	1.40	0.8	6.32
4	"Camp Bananas"	December 7, 2020	0.6	5.28	0.2	1.35	0.8	6.63
5	"Sleeping Next to an Old Boat"	December 14, 2020	0.5	4.85	—N/a	—N/a	—N/a	—N/a
6	"A Tight Ass is a Wonderful Thing"	January 4, 2021	0.6	5.63	0.2	1.22	0.8	6.85
7	"The Wrong Adebambo"	January 18, 2021	0.7	5.55	—N/a	—N/a	—N/a	—N/a
8	"Honest Yak Prices"	January 25, 2021	0.8	5.96	—N/a	—N/a	—N/a	—N/a
9	"Tunde the Boy King"	February 8, 2021	0.8	5.54	0.2	1.35	1.0	6.89
10	"The Cheerleader Leader"	February 22, 2021	0.7	5.56	—N/a	1.47	—N/a	7.04
11	"I Did Not Raise Him to be a Teenager"	March 8, 2021	0.7	5.20	—N/a	1.39	—N/a	6.60
12	"We Don't Rat on Family"	March 15, 2021	0.6	5.10	—N/a	—N/a	—N/a	—N/a
13	"A Big African Bassoon"	April 12, 2021	0.5	4.74	—N/a	—N/a	—N/a	—N/a
14	"A Tough Old Bird"	April 19, 2021	0.6	4.93	0.2	1.45	0.8	6.38
15	"TLC: Tunde's Loving Care"	April 26, 2021	0.5	4.69	0.2	1.44	0.7	6.13
16	"Sights and Bites"	May 3, 2021	0.6	4.91	0.2	1.37	0.8	6.04
17	"The Devil's Taste Buds"	May 10, 2021	0.5	4.90	0.2	1.36	0.7	6.26
18	"God Accepts Venmo"	May 17, 2021	0.7	5.39	0.2	1.33	0.9	6.72

=== Season 3 ===
Viewership and ratings per episode of List of Bob Hearts Abishola episodes
No.	Title	Air date	Rating (18–49)	Viewers (millions)	DVR (18–49)	DVR viewers (millions)	Total (18–49)	Total viewers (millions)
1	"Welcome to Lagos"	September 20, 2021	0.5	5.43	TBD	TBD	TBD	TBD
2	"Bowango"	September 27, 2021	0.6	5.49	TBD	TBD	TBD	TBD
3	"Dud"	October 4, 2021	0.5	5.21	TBD	TBD	TBD	TBD
4	"Old Strokey"	October 11, 2021	0.5	5.12	0.2	1.46	0.7	6.58
5	"Greasy Badge of Honor"	October 18, 2021	0.5	5.05	0.2	1.34	0.7	6.38
6	"The Devil's Throuple"	November 1, 2021	0.5	4.98	TBD	TBD	TBD	TBD
7	"Fumble in the Dark"	November 8, 2021	0.5	4.96	TBD	TBD	TBD	TBD
8	"Light Duty"	November 29, 2021	0.5	4.88	0.2	1.34	0.7	6.22
9	"I'm Not Edsel"	December 6, 2021	0.5	5.08	0.1	1.33	0.6	6.40
10	"Tunde123"	January 3, 2022	0.5	5.21	TBD	TBD	TBD	TBD
11	"Cats in a Bathtub"	January 17, 2022	0.5	5.49	TBD	TBD	TBD	TBD
12	"Your Beans are Flatlining"	January 24, 2022	0.6	5.86	TBD	TBD	TBD	TBD
13	"One Man, No Baby"	February 28, 2022	0.6	5.50	TBD	TBD	TBD	TBD
14	"Every Subpoena is a Tiny Hug"	March 7, 2022	0.5	5.71	TBD	TBD	TBD	TBD
15	"Compress to Impress"	March 14, 2022	0.6	5.71	TBD	TBD	TBD	TBD
16	"I'll Sleep When I'm Dead"	March 21, 2022	0.5	5.40	TBD	TBD	TBD	TBD
17	"Inappropriate Nakedness"	March 28, 2022	0.5	5.13	TBD	TBD	TBD	TBD
18	"Greasy Underdog"	April 18, 2022	0.4	4.97	TBD	TBD	TBD	TBD
19	"Who Raised You"	May 2, 2022	0.5	5.40	TBD	TBD	TBD	TBD
20	"Wrangling a Greased Pig"	May 9, 2022	0.4	5.14	TBD	TBD	TBD	TBD
21	"A Little Slap and Tickle"	May 16, 2022	0.5	5.33	TBD	TBD	TBD	TBD
22	"Beard In Her Pulpit"	May 23, 2022	0.5	5.70	TBD	TBD	TBD	TBD

=== Season 4 ===
Viewership and ratings per episode of List of Bob Hearts Abishola episodes
No.	Title	Air date	Rating (18–49)	Viewers (millions)	DVR (18–49)	DVR viewers (millions)	Total (18–49)	Total viewers (millions)
1	"Touched by a Holy Hand"	September 19, 2022	0.4	4.44	0.1	1.40	0.6	5.84
2	"Bibles to Brothels"	September 26, 2022	0.4	4.73	0.1	1.34	0.5	6.08
3	"Americans and Their Dreams"	October 3, 2022	0.4	5.08	0.1	1.28	0.6	6.37
4	"Inner Boss Bitch"	October 10, 2022	0.4	4.79	0.1	1.23	0.5	6.02
5	"Kicked Outta the Dele Club"	October 17, 2022	0.4	5.07	0.1	1.19	0.6	6.27
6	"Two Rusty Tractors"	October 24, 2022	0.5	5.45	0.1	1.16	0.6	6.61
7	"Your Father's Kingdom"	November 14, 2022	0.4	4.59	0.1	1.15	0.5	5.74
8	"Estée Lauder and Goat Meat"	November 21, 2022	0.4	5.13	TBD	TBD	TBD	TBD
9	"Idle Nigerians"	December 5, 2022	0.4	4.89	TBD	TBD	TBD	TBD
10	"An Afro and a Peugeot"	January 16, 2023	0.3	4.72	0.1	1.14	0.5	5.86
11	"Twerk O' Clock"	January 23, 2023	0.5	5.84	TBD	TBD	TBD	TBD
12	"My Successful Lawyer Son"	February 6, 2023	0.5	5.78	TBD	TBD	TBD	TBD
13	"Happy People Are Lazy"	February 13, 2023	0.4	5.63	TBD	TBD	TBD	TBD
14	"Put that Toe on Ice"	February 27, 2023	0.5	5.56	TBD	TBD	TBD	TBD
15	"Every Character Is the Villain"	March 13, 2023	0.5	4.99	TBD	TBD	TBD	TBD
16	"Mmm, Fresh Baked Sock!"	March 20, 2023	0.4	5.09	TBD	TBD	TBD	TBD
17	"I'll Never Play Banjo Again"	April 10, 2023	0.4	4.55	TBD	TBD	TBD	TBD
18	"A Hundred CCs of Handsome"	April 17, 2023	0.3	4.49	TBD	TBD	TBD	TBD
19	"Keep That Under Your Gele"	May 1, 2023	0.4	4.76	TBD	TBD	TBD	TBD
20	"The Genius Who Fell Out of my Womb"	May 8, 2023	0.4	4.41	TBD	TBD	TBD	TBD
21	"Take Two Yellows and Go to Bed"	May 15, 2023	0.4	4.35	TBD	TBD	TBD	TBD
22	"Uncharted Waters of Mediocrity"	May 22, 2023	0.4	4.77	TBD	TBD	TBD	TBD

=== Season 5 ===
Viewership and ratings per episode of List of Bob Hearts Abishola episodes
No.	Title	Air date	Rating (18–49)	Viewers (millions)
1	"The Dead Eyes of a Respectful Son"	February 12, 2024	0.5	5.21
2	"Kill the Cat"	February 19, 2024	0.4	4.81
3	"The Devil's Hot Tub"	February 26, 2024	0.4	4.68
4	"The Heart Attack Boys"	March 4, 2024	0.4	4.68
5	"Tayo Time"	March 4, 2024	0.4	4.45
6	"A Tablespoon of Dad"	March 11, 2024	0.3	4.30
7	"Worth the Cooties"	March 18, 2024	0.3	3.73
8	"My Michelle Obama"	March 25, 2024	0.4	4.27
9	"Sad Cupcakes"	April 1, 2024	0.4	4.17
10	"Diamonds Are Made to Sparkle"	April 15, 2024	0.3	4.23
11	"These Giants Are Flexible"	April 22, 2024	0.3	4.09
12	"Olu! I Popped!"	April 29, 2024	0.3	4.25
13	"Find Your Bench"	May 6, 2024	0.4	4.86

Bob Hearts Abishola : U.S. viewers per episode (millions)

Season	Episode number																					
Season	1	2	3	4	5	6	7	8	9	10	11	12	13	14	15	16	17	18	19	20	21	22
1	5.89	5.36	5.30	4.87	5.27	5.71	5.62	6.02	5.65	5.99	6.15	6.66	6.50	5.85	6.00	6.12	5.81	6.89	6.73	6.81	–	
2	5.22	4.90	4.92	5.28	4.85	5.63	5.55	5.96	5.54	5.56	5.20	5.10	4.74	4.93	4.69	4.91	4.90	5.39	–			
3	5.43	5.49	5.21	5.12	5.05	4.98	4.96	4.88	5.08	5.21	5.49	5.86	5.50	5.71	5.71	5.40	5.13	4.97	5.40	5.14	5.33	5.70
4	4.44	4.73	5.08	4.79	5.07	5.45	4.59	5.13	4.89	4.72	5.84	5.78	5.63	5.56	4.99	5.09	4.55	4.49	4.76	4.41	4.35	4.77
5	5.21	4.81	4.68	4.68	4.45	4.30	3.73	4.27	4.17	4.23	4.09	4.25	4.86	–								

Audience measurement performed by Nielsen Media Research
