= Bob Hearts Abishola =

American television sitcom (2019–2024)

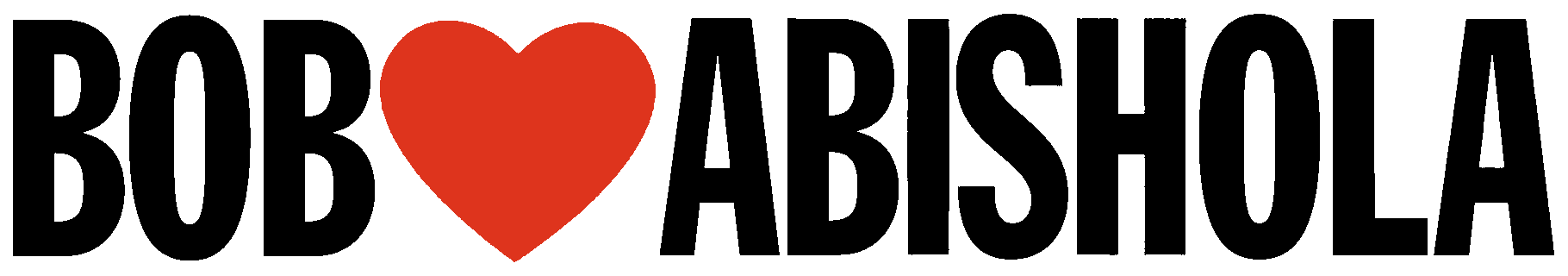
- Genre: Sitcom
- Created by: Chuck Lorre; Eddie Gorodetsky; Al Higgins; Gina Yashere
- Showrunners: Chuck Lorre; Al Higgins; Gina Yashere; Matt Ross
- Starring: Billy Gardell; Folake Olowofoyeku; Christine Ebersole; Matt Jones; Maribeth Monroe; Shola Adewusi; Barry Shabaka Henley; Travis Wolfe Jr.; Vernee Watson; Gina Yashere; Bayo Akinfemi; Anthony Okungbowa; Saidah Arrika Ekulona
- Opening theme: "Ifanla" by Sola Akingbola
- Composer: Sola Akingbola
- Country of origin: United States
- Original language: English
- No. of seasons: 5
- No. of episodes: 95 (list of episodes)

Production
- Executive producers: Chuck Lorre; Eddie Gorodetsky; Al Higgins; Matt Ross; Gina Yashere
- Cinematography: Patti Lee
- Editors: Peter Chakos; Pamela Marshall
- Camera setup: Multi-camera
- Running time: 18–21 minutes
- Production companies: Chuck Lorre Productions; Warner Bros. Television

Original release
- Network: CBS
- Release: September 23, 2019 – May 6, 2024

Bob Hearts Abishola (stylized as Bob ♡ Abishola) is an American television sitcom created by Chuck Lorre, Eddie Gorodetsky, Al Higgins, and Gina Yashere that ran on CBS from September 23, 2019, to May 6, 2024, lasting five seasons and 95 episodes. It stars Billy Gardell and Folake Olowofoyeku as the respective titular characters, with Christine Ebersole, Matt Jones, Maribeth Monroe, Shola Adewusi, Barry Shabaka Henley, Travis Wolfe Jr., Vernee Watson, Bayo Akinfemi, Anthony Okungbowa, Saidah Arrika Ekulona, and Gina Yashere in supporting roles. In February 2021, the series was renewed for a third season, which premiered on September 20, 2021. In January 2022, the series was renewed for a fourth season, which premiered on September 19, 2022.

In January 2023, the series was renewed for a fifth season which premiered on February 12, 2024. However, eleven of the show's thirteen main cast members were downgraded to recurring. In November 2023, it was announced that the fifth season would be the series' final season, with the series finale airing on May 6, 2024.

== Premise ==
Bob Wheeler runs his family's successful, highly competitive compression sock medical supply company in Detroit with his widowed mother Dottie and his younger twin siblings, Christina and Douglas. When the stress of the job lands Bob in Woodward Memorial Hospital, due to a mild heart attack, he is immediately drawn to Abishola Adebambo, his kind, hardworking Nigerian nurse. Despite their differences, Bob falls in love with Abishola and sets his sights on getting her to give him a chance.

== Cast ==
=== Overview ===
Actor	Character	Seasons				
Actor	Character	1	2	3	4	5
Billy Gardell	Robert "Bob" Wheeler	Main	Main	Main	Main	Main
Folake Olowofoyeku	Abishola Bolatito Doyinsola Oluwatoyin Wheeler	Main	Main	Main	Main	Main
Christine Ebersole	Dorothy "Dottie" Wheeler	Main	Main	Main	Main	Recurring
Matt Jones	Douglas Wheeler	Main	Main	Main	Main	Recurring
Maribeth Monroe	Christina Wheeler	Main	Main	Main	Main	Recurring
Shola Adewusi	Oluwatoyin "Olu" Ifedayo Olatunji	Main	Main	Main	Main	Recurring
Barry Shabaka Henley	Babatunde "Tunde" Temitope Olatunji	Main	Main	Main	Main	Recurring
Travis Wolfe Jr.	Bamidele "Dele" Babatunde Adebambo	Main	Main	Main	Main	Recurring
Vernee Watson-Johnson	Gloria Tyler	Main	Main	Main	Main	Recurring
Gina Yashere	Oluwakemi "Kemi" Adeyemi	Main	Main	Main	Main	Recurring
Bayo Akinfemi	Goodwin Aderibigbe Olayiwola	Main	Main	Main	Main	Recurring
Anthony Okungbowa	Kofoworola "Kofo" Omogoriola Olanipekun	Main	Main	Main	Main	Recurring
Saidah Arrika Ekulona	Ebunoluwa "Ebun" Adebisi Odegbami		Recurring	Recurring	Main	Recurring

=== Main ===
- Billy Gardell as Robert "Bob" Wheeler, a divorced man who runs MaxDot, his family's compression sock manufacturing company in Detroit. After his father died suddenly, Bob dropped out of college to run the business with his mother, Dottie. When Bob has a heart attack because of the business and his family, he wakes at the hospital where he meets a Nigerian nurse and falls in love.
- Folake Olowofoyeku as Abishola Bolatito Doyinsola Oluwatoyin Wheeler (formerly Adebambo, née Odegbami), Bob's nurse at Woodward Memorial Hospital; a Nigerian immigrant who lives with her son, aunt and uncle in a small apartment. Abishola and her husband emigrated to America with their son approximately eight years prior to season 2, but her husband returned to Nigeria after deciding he didn't want to start over in their new country. She studies to become a doctor.
- Christine Ebersole as Dorothy "Dottie" Wheeler (seasons 1–4; recurring season 5), Bob, Douglas and Christina's mother. She and her late husband, Max, were the founders of the eponymous MaxDot. After suffering a stroke, she moved in with Bob and receives nursing care from Abishola at Bob's house.
- Matt Jones as Douglas Wheeler (seasons 1–4; recurring season 5), Dottie's son, Bob's younger brother and Christina's twin brother. He is the vice president of human resources at MaxDot, a position he got purely through nepotism. (As Douglas alludes in season 4, "My greatest skill is having the last name Wheeler.") In season 2, Dottie demotes him to the warehouse floor, in an effort to teach him discipline and get him to take his job seriously. Despite initial objections, Douglas comes to enjoy his new job and especially likes the camaraderie with the warehouse workers, particularly Kofo and Goodwin. He began a serious relationship with a bus driver named Olivia in Season 3, but confirms sadly in Season 4 that they broke up.
- Maribeth Monroe as Christina Wheeler (seasons 1–4; recurring season 5), Dottie's daughter, Bob's younger sister and Douglas' twin sister. She is the head of sales at MaxDot and was previously married, but the relationship ended after she stabbed her husband with a knife. Frustrated with being unappreciated at work, she explores new career opportunities in season 3, eventually landing at one of MaxDot's competitors. After being fired from her new job in season 4, Christina returns to MaxDot as a janitor; she shows previously unseen determination and humility, and by the end of Season 4 she's earned a promotion to handle MaxDot's marketing section. In Season 5, she has started the process of becoming pregnant and being a single mom.
- Shola Adewusi as Oluwatoyin "Olu" Ifedayo Olatunji (née Odegbami) (seasons 1–4; recurring season 5), Abishola's maternal aunt and Tunde's wife.
- Barry Shabaka Henley as Babatunde "Tunde" Temitope Olatunji (seasons 1–4; recurring season 5), Abishola's uncle and Olu's husband.
- Travis Wolfe Jr. as Bamidele "Dele" Babatunde Adebambo (seasons 1–4; recurring season 5), teenage son of Abishola and her ex-husband, Tayo. He dreams of being a professional dancer against Abishola and Tayo's wishes. After failing to get into Juilliard, he heads to NYU to study choreography.
- Vernee Watson-Johnson as Gloria Tyler (seasons 1–4; recurring season 5), a charge nurse at Woodward Memorial Hospital and Abishola's co-worker. She studied to become a doctor, but just as she was about to start her residency at Detroit Memorial Hospital, the doors were closed to her. Because she had a family and needed a job, she ended up becoming a nurse.
- Gina Yashere as Oluwakemi "Kemi" Adeyemi (seasons 1–4; recurring season 5), Abishola's narcissistic best friend for the last 20 years. She works in food service at Woodward Memorial Hospital.
- Bayo Akinfemi as Goodwin Aderibigbe Olayiwola (seasons 1–4; recurring season 5), an employee at MaxDot and Kofo's cousin. They often speak to each other privately in Yoruba. In season 2, it is revealed that Goodwin was on a path toward becoming a professor of economics before leaving Nigeria. In season 3, it is revealed that Bob intends to make Goodwin his successor after he retires. Frustrated that Bob won't be retiring anytime soon, Goodwin briefly goes to work at Christina's company before Bob invites him back with a promotion to MaxDot president. Blunt and sometimes Machiavellian, he has stated that his personal hero is Ronald Reagan.
- Anthony Okungbowa as Kofoworola "Kofo" Omogoriola Olanipekun (seasons 1–4; recurring season 5), an employee at MaxDot and Goodwin's cousin who lives in an apartment above Goodwin's garage. He is promoted to Christina's position after she suddenly quits in season 3, later losing the job when she earns it back. He and Goodwin have a contentious relationship; they have supported each other but Goodwin's harshness contrasts to Kofo's essentially cheerful nature.
- Saidah Arrika Ekulona as Ebunoluwa "Ebun" Adebisi Odegbami (season 4; recurring seasons 2–3, 5), Abishola's mother and Olu's sister No one likes her on merit, but she has shown some humanity and also that she loves her daughter and respects her new son-in-law Bob.

=== Recurring ===
- Tony Tambi as Chukwuemeka David Mborie, a pharmacist who was once Abishola's suitor but is Kemi's husband by the end of the series.
- Kimberly Scott as Ogechi Mborata, Chukwuemeka's smothering and manipulative mother
- Raymond Ma as Wati Zhao (seasons 1, 3 and 4), MaxDot's sock supplier from Malaysia, who is brought to work at MaxDot's new manufacturing division in Season 4.
- Conphidance as Pastor Balogun (seasons 1–2), the pastor at Abishola's church
- Vishesh Chachra as Dr. Sanjiv Chakraborty (seasons 1–2), an arrogant doctor who works at Woodward Memorial Hospital
- Nicole Sullivan as Lorraine Wheeler (seasons 1–2), Bob's ex-wife
- Dayo Ade as Tayo Adebambo (seasons 2–5), Dele's father and Abishola's Nigerian husband who finally grants her a divorce near the end of season 2
- Tori Danner as Morenike (seasons 2–4), Abishola's cousin staying in Dele's old room, which Olu and Tunde rented. She is studying to become a pharmacist, while trying to keep the secret that she's gay.
- Edy Ganem as Olivia (season 3), a bus driver who becomes Douglas' girlfriend until their break up in Season 4
- Jonathan Adams as Pastor Joseph Falade (seasons 3–5), the new Pastor at Abishola's church who appears to take a romantic interest in Ebunoluwa.
- Joel Murray as Max Wheeler (seasons 4–5), founder of MaxDot and Bob's deceased father. Bob sees him in visions, usually when he's stressed.

=== Guest ===
- Missi Pyle as Liz (season 1), Bob's online date.
- Wendie Malick and Marilu Henner as Jen Davenport and Trish Dolan (season 1), Dottie's friends.
- John Ratzenberger as Hank Sobieski (season 1), a fellow stroke survivor whom Dottie meets.
- Leonard Roberts as Guy (season 1), Hank's caretaker.
- Ryan Cartwright as David (season 2), a salesman at a jewelry store where Bob and Tunde go to buy an engagement ring.
- Jack McGee and Susan Ruttan as Mr. and Mrs. Clark (season 2), a patient at the Woodward Memorial Hospital and his wife.
- Joel Brooks as Arnie Goldfischer (season 2), Bob's lawyer.
- Nene Nwoko as Tiwa (seasons 3–4), Goodwin's wife.
- Patricia Belcher as Esther (season 3), a grumpy patient at the Woodward Memorial Hospital
- Briga Heelan as Marion Mitchell (season 3), a commercial director who is brought in to shoot a TV spot for MaxDot.
- Cedric the Entertainer and Tichina Arnold as Calvin and Tina Butler (season 3), reprising their roles from The Neighborhood as they watch the MaxDot TV commercial.
- Adhir Kalyan as Jared (season 4), a Toesie Wosey employee and Christina's stalker.
- Amy Farrington as Dr. Bradford (season 5), a patient at the Woodward Memorial Hospital who is a therapist.
- Jimmy Akingbola as Ade (season 5), Abishola's brother.
- Avie Porto as Maxine (season 5), Christina's daughter.

== Episodes ==
Season	Episodes	Originally released	
Season	Episodes	First released	Last released
1	20	September 23, 2019	April 13, 2020
2	18	November 16, 2020	May 17, 2021
3	22	September 20, 2021	May 23, 2022
4	22	September 19, 2022	May 22, 2023
5	13	February 12, 2024	May 6, 2024

== Production ==
=== Development ===
On October 5, 2018, it was announced that CBS had given the production an early pilot order. The pilot was written by Chuck Lorre, who was an executive producer, along with Eddie Gorodetsky, Al Higgins and Gina Yashere. The production companies that were involved with the pilot included Chuck Lorre Productions and Warner Bros. Television. It was announced on May 6, 2019, that the production had been given a series order. A day after that, it was announced that the series would premiere in the fall of 2019 and air on Mondays at 8:30 p.m. The series debuted on September 23, 2019. On October 22, 2019, it was announced that CBS had ordered an additional nine episodes of the series. On March 13, 2020, Warner Bros. Television announced that production was suspended due to the television impact of the COVID-19 pandemic. The shutdown left the last two intended episodes of the season unfilmed. On May 6, 2020, CBS renewed the series for a second season, which premiered on November 16, 2020. On February 17, 2021, CBS renewed the series for a third season which premiered on September 20, 2021. On January 24, 2022, CBS renewed the series for a fourth season which premiered on September 19, 2022. On January 25, 2023, CBS renewed the series for a fifth season, which premiered on February 12, 2024. On November 29, 2023, it was announced that the fifth season would be the show’s last, and the series finale aired on May 6, 2024.

=== Casting ===
On December 17, 2018, it was announced that five co-leads, opposite Billy Gardell and Folake Olowofoyeku as the title characters, had been cast, including Christine Ebersole, Maribeth Monroe, Matt Jones, Shola Adewusi and Barry Shabaka Henley.

This is Gardell's second starring role in a CBS sitcom, after Mike & Molly, which ran from 2010 to 2016 and was also executive produced by Lorre; in addition, Gardell has a recurring role on Young Sheldon as Herschel Sparks, a neighbor of the title character. Matt Jones is an alum of fellow Lorre/CBS series Mom. On January 30, 2020, it was reported that Anthony Okungbowa and Bayo Akinfemi had been promoted to series regulars. On September 7, 2022, it was reported that Saidah Arrika Ekulona has been promoted to series regular in season 4. On April 26, 2023, it was announced that Gardell and Olowofoyeku were the only cast members who would remain series regulars as the rest of the cast were reduced to five-episode contracts for "recurring status" for the fifth season.

=== Filming ===
While the show was set in Detroit, Bob Hearts Abishola was filmed at Warner Brothers Burbank Studios in Los Angeles. Several Detroit references are incorporated into the show's setting. For example, the fictional Woodward Memorial Hospital where Abishola works is a reference to Woodward Avenue, Michigan Highway M-1, which is a main route running from Detroit to Pontiac and named for Augustus Woodward who planned and oversaw the redevelopment of the city of Detroit following a devastating fire in 1805. Dele attends Jamerson Middle School, a likely reference to the legendary Motown bass player James Jamerson. Also, Abishola and Kemi ride to work on the 16 Dexter bus, which is a real bus line for the Detroit Department of Transportation (DDOT). Co-creator Lorre chose the location, in part, because of Detroit's rapidly growing immigrant population. While Detroit's U.S.-born inhabitants declined 5.3 percent between the 2010 census and 2014, the immigrant population rose by 12.7 percent. The cast and crew were set to do a filming location in Lagos, Nigeria for Season 3 episodes set in Lagos, but due to the COVID-19 pandemic, the episodes set in Lagos were filmed in southern California instead.

In season 2 and 3, the series was filmed on a closed set without a studio audience because of COVID-19; laugh tracks were added during post-production.

== Release ==
=== Marketing ===
On May 15, 2019, CBS released the first official trailer for the series.

=== Broadcasting ===
Bob Hearts Abishola premiered on CBS on September 23, 2019 and ended on May 6, 2024.

=== Syndication ===
The series made its broadcast syndication debut in local markets on September 9, 2024, with Cozi TV and Laff later adding the show to their schedules. Repeats also began airing on The CW on November 15, 2024.

== Reception ==
=== Critical response ===
The review aggregator website Rotten Tomatoes reported a 58% approval rating with an average rating of 6.75/10, based on 12 reviews. The website's critical consensus reads, "Groundbreaking, but unfortunately grating, Bob (Hearts) Abishola undermines its own progressive premise with underwhelming humor that relies too heavily on outdated stereotypes." Metacritic, which uses a weighted average, assigned a score of 57 out of 100 based on 10 critics, indicating "mixed or average reviews".

=== Accolades ===
Year	Award	Category	Recipients	Result	Ref.
2020	Primetime Emmy Awards	Outstanding Cinematography for a Multi-Camera Series	Patti Lee (for "Ice Cream for Breakfast")	Nominated	
2021	Art Directors Guild Awards	Excellence in Production Design for a Multi-Camera Series	John Shaffner (for "Randy's a Wrangler", "Paris is for Lovers, Not Mothers" and "Straight Outta Lagos")	Nominated	
2021	NAACP Image Awards	Outstanding Actress in a Comedy Series	Folake Olowofoyeku	Nominated	
2022	Primetime Emmy Awards	Outstanding Production Design for a Narrative Program (Half-Hour or Less)	Gail L. Russell and Ann Shea (for "Bowango")	Nominated	
2022	Set Decorators Society of America Awards	Best Achievement in Décor/Design of a Half-Hour Multi-Camera Series	Ann Shea and Francoise Cherry-Cohen	Nominated	

=== Ratings ===
Viewership and ratings per season of Bob Hearts Abishola
Season	Timeslot (ET)	Episodes	First aired		Last aired		TV season	Viewership rank	Avg. viewers (millions)	18–49 rank	Avg. 18–49 rating
Season	Timeslot (ET)	Episodes	Date	Viewers (millions)	Date	Viewers (millions)	TV season	Viewership rank	Avg. viewers (millions)	18–49 rank	Avg. 18–49 rating
1	Monday 8.30 p.m.	20	September 23, 2019	5.89	April 13, 2020	6.81	2019–20	43	7.54	61	1.0
2	Monday 8.30 p.m.	18	November 16, 2020	5.22	May 17, 2021	5.39	2020–21	36	6.57	59	0.8
3	Monday 8.30 p.m.	22	September 20, 2021	5.43	May 23, 2022	5.70	2021–22	32	6.66	45	0.7
4	Monday 8.30 p.m.	22	September 19, 2022	4.44	May 22, 2023	4.77	2022–23	31	6.11	59	0.5
5	Monday 8.30 p.m. (1–3, 5–13); Monday 8.00 p.m. (4)	13	February 12, 2024	5.21	May 6, 2024	4.86	2023–24	TBD	TBD	TBD	TBD
