= Keeping Up with the Joneses (film) =

2016 film by Greg Mottola

- Theatrical release poster
- Directed by: Greg Mottola
- Written by: Michael LeSieur
- Produced by: Laurie MacDonald; Walter F. Parkes
- Starring: Zach Galifianakis; Jon Hamm; Isla Fisher; Gal Gadot
- Cinematography: Andrew Dunn
- Edited by: David Rennie
- Music by: Jake Monaco
- Production companies: Fox 2000 Pictures; Parkes + MacDonald Image Nation
- Distributed by: 20th Century Fox
- Release dates: October 8, 2016 (Los Angeles); October 21, 2016 (United States)
- Running time: 105 minutes
- Country: United States
- Language: English
- Budget: $40 million
- Box office: $29.9 million

Keeping Up with the Joneses is a 2016 American action comedy film directed by Greg Mottola and distributed by 20th Century Fox. It was written by Michael LeSieur. Its story follows a suburban couple (Zach Galifianakis and Isla Fisher) who begin to suspect their new neighbors (Jon Hamm and Gal Gadot) are secret agents.

Production began in the United States in 2015 and was released on October 21, 2016. It received generally negative reviews from critics and grossed $5,461,475 during its opening week and $29.9 million worldwide, against a $40 million budget, making it a box office bomb.

== Plot ==
Jeff Gaffney works as a human resources professional at MBI, a defense contractor company based in Atlanta. He and his wife Karen live in a nice cul-de-sac with their two children, who are away at summer camp. They make the acquaintance of their new neighbors, Tim and Natalie Jones. Tim is a travel writer whose hobbies include glassblowing, and Natalie is a social media consultant, cooking blogger, and philanthropist. They are both impossibly good-looking, accomplished, and stylish, yet overly friendly with the Gaffneys.

Karen starts having suspicions about the Joneses when she catches Tim poking around Jeff's den during a neighborhood block party, then witnesses Natalie doing what looks like a dead drop in a café. Karen follows Natalie to the mall, but Natalie confronts her in a dressing room, defusing the situation with some female bonding. Meanwhile, Tim invites Jeff to an underground Chinese restaurant, where Jeff drinks snake wine and is bitten by a severed snake head, forcing Tim to save his life. In exchange, Jeff takes Tim to indoor skydiving, a passion of his that none of his friends share. All the way through, Tim tries to have Jeff talk about his coworkers at the office. One night, with the help of Natalie, Tim sneaks into the MBI building and looks over Jeff's emails.

Back at their house, Jeff accidentally breaks the glass sculpture made by Tim that was given to them, revealing a bug among the shards. Realizing the Joneses are spies, Karen decides to sneak into their house to find more evidence. They discover files on Jeff and the other MBI employees and Jeff accidentally stuns Karen with a pen gun. They narrowly escape as the Joneses arrive. Natalie is worried Tim might be getting too close to Jeff, but they reveal they are in love with each other, which is also against the rules. Natalie notices the used pen gun on the floor, and they realize the Gaffneys had broken into their house.

The Gaffneys arrange a private meeting with MBI's head of security, Carl Pronger to expose the Joneses, but before Carl can disclose classified details, he is killed by a sniper who also attacks the Gaffneys. They are rescued by the Joneses, leading to a high-speed chase and shootout. The Gaffneys learn that the Joneses are actually trying to discover whether there is treason within MBI. Back in the cul-de-sac, Jeff gives Tim and Natalie some relationship advice, and the two couples bond. After they return to their houses, the Joneses trigger a bomb that blows up their house.

Later, after lying to the police about the Joneses, the Gaffneys are frantically preparing to go on the run when the Joneses reappear alive and well in the Gaffneys' basement. They kidnapped Jeff's colleague Dan Craverston and his wife Meg, who are revealed to be trying to sell MBI's experimental microchips to an international arms dealer called "The Scorpion". When the Scorpion calls on Dan's phone, Jeff answers posing as Dan and arranges a meeting to deliver the microchips.

Jeff and Karen go to the hotel where the meeting takes place, while the Joneses back them up from the roof. The Scorpion turns out to be a former MBI employee named Bruce Springstine who recognizes Jeff. With their cover blown, Tim radios for backup, but the operation is aborted and the Gaffneys are declared collateral damage. The Joneses disobey orders and surrender to the Scorpion, but before the latter gets around to killing them, Karen is able to pass a knife to Natalie, giving the Joneses the opportunity to eliminate half of the Scorpion's henchmen. They escape by jumping out the window into a pool, just before the briefcase containing the chips is detonated by Natalie, and a bomb kills the Scorpion and his remaining henchmen. Proud of their new friends, the Joneses say goodbye and go back to their life of espionage.

The next summer, the Gaffneys visit the café in Marrakesh where the Joneses used to date and happen upon the Joneses who are in the middle of a new mission, accidentally blowing their cover and triggering yet another gunfight.

== Cast ==
- Zach Galifianakis as Jeff Gaffney
- Jon Hamm as Tim Jones
- Isla Fisher as Karen Gaffney
- Gal Gadot as Natalie Jones
- Matt Walsh as Dan Craverston
- Maribeth Monroe as Meg Craverston
- Patton Oswalt as Bruce Springstine / Scorpion
- Kevin Dunn as Carl Pronger
- Jona Xiao as Stacey Chung
- Bobby Lee as Ricky Lu

== Production ==
In March 2014, it was announced that Greg Mottola would direct the film, from a screenplay by Michael LeSieur, with Fox 2000 Pictures having their eyes set on Jon Hamm and Zach Galifianakis to star, Walter Parkes and Laurie MacDonald producing under their Parkes + MacDonald Image Nation banner, and Marc Resteghini serving as an executive producer. In October 2014, Isla Fisher joined the cast of the film, and the casting of Hamm and Galifianakis was confirmed. In February 2015, Gal Gadot was in negotiations to star in the film. In April 2015, Maribeth Monroe and Matt Walsh also joined the cast.

=== Filming ===
Principal photography on the film began on April 20, 2015 in Atlanta, Georgia.

== Release ==
The film was originally scheduled to be released on April 1, 2016, but was pushed back to October 21, 2016.

== Reception ==
=== Box office ===
Keeping Up with the Joneses grossed $14.9 million in North America and $15 million in other territories for a worldwide total of $29.9 million, against a budget of $40 million.

The film was expected to gross $7–9 million from about 3,022 theaters in its opening weekend. However, it only grossed $2 million on its first day and $5.6 million in its opening weekend, finishing 7th at the box office, and making $1 million less than Galifianakis' Masterminds, which debuted to $6.6 million the month before.

=== Critical response ===
On Rotten Tomatoes, the film has an approval rating of 19% based on 123 reviews and an average rating of 4.40/10. The website's critical consensus reads, "Keeping Up with the Joneses squanders a decent premise – and a talented cast full of funny people – on a witless and largely laugh-free suburban spy adventure." On Metacritic, the film has a score 34 out of 100, based on 31 critics, indicating "generally unfavorable" reviews. Audiences polled by CinemaScore gave the film an average grade of "B−" on an A+ to F scale.

Owen Gleiberman of Variety gave Keeping Up with the Joneses a mixed review calling it "An amiable time-killer of an espionage comedy." Jon Frosch of The Hollywood Reporter called it "Stale as week-old bread and every bit as bland". Frosch was positive about the cast but critical of the script. Ben Kenigsberg of The New York Times wrote, "The absence of laughs can’t be blamed on a lack of talent" and expressed surprise that Mottola did not succeed based on his past films.

=== Accolades ===
This film resulted in three nominations at the 2017 Teen Choice Awards. Zach Galifianakis was nominated as Teen Choice Award for Choice Movie Actor – Comedy, and Gal Gadot was nominated as Teen Choice Award for Choice Movie Actress – Comedy. The film itself was nominated as Teen Choice Award for Choice Movie – Comedy.
