= Toronto Film School =

Film school in Toronto, Canada

Coordinates: 43°39′22″N 79°22′49″W

- Type: For-profit
- President: Andrew Barnsley
- Location: Toronto, Canada
- Campus: Urban
- Website: www.torontofilmschool.ca

Toronto Film School is a for-profit post-secondary institution based in Toronto, Ontario, Canada. The school offers creative diploma programs in the areas of film, entertainment, graphic design, and video games. In July 2021, Andrew Barnsley became the new President of the school. Besides full-time programs TFS offers part-time and online diploma programs.

== Programs ==
Toronto Film School offers the following diploma programs:

- Acting for Film, TV & the Theatre
- Film Production
- Writing for Film & TV
- Video Game Design & Animation
- Video Game Design & Development
- Graphic Design & Interactive Media

=== Campus ===
As of April 2026, Toronto Film School’s campus is located at 120 Bloor Street E, Toronto, ON, M4W 1B7.

Prior to relocation, they had three buildings on campus in Downtown Toronto.

- 10 Dundas Street E., Suite 704 Toronto, ON, M5B 2G9
- 1835 Yonge Street Toronto, ON, M4S 1X8
- 415 Yonge Street, Toronto, ON, M5B 2E7

== Notable alumni ==
- Bayo Akinfemi, Nigerian actor and director
- Zain Duraie, Jordanian director, writer and actress
- Ali Kazmi, Pakistani-Canadian film and television actor
- Saja Kilani, Canadian-Jordanian film actress and spoken-word poet
- Jason Sanjay, Indian film director
