= Human Cargo =

- Also known as: "Third World"
- Genre: Drama
- Written by: Linda Svendsen; Brian McKeown
- Directed by: Brad Turner
- Starring: Kate Nelligan; Cara Pifko; Nicholas Campbell
- Country of origin: Canada
- Original language: English
- No. of episodes: 3

Production
- Production locations: Cape Town, South Africa
- Production company: Force Four Entertainment

Original release
- Network: CBC Television
- Release: 4 January 2004 – 2004

Human Cargo is a 2004 Canadian television miniseries. The series won seven Gemini Awards and two Directors Guild of Canada Awards. It premiered on CBC Television on January 4, 2004 and starred Kate Nelligan, Cara Pifko, Bayo Akinfemi and Nicholas Campbell.

The series was written by Linda Svendsen and Brian McKeown.

== Plot ==
The miniseries explores the issue of immigration and refugees who flee to Canada after 9/11 and the people who sacrifice their lives to help or hinder them. The series features six intersecting stories focusing on the crises of refugees, set in different locations: four Honduran boys are found dead in a produce truck at the Canada-U.S. border crossing; a dedicated refugee lawyer Jerry Fischer is forced to choose between his family, work, and life when he becomes involved with an Afghan woman's refugee claim; and ambitious right-wing politician Nina Wade finds her career end disastrously after a federal by-election that moves her into a position at the Immigration and Refugee Board of Canada.
