= The Inside Man (Agents of S.H.I.E.L.D.) =

- Agents of S.H.I.E.L.D. episode
- Episode no.: Season 3 Episode 12
- Directed by: John Terlesky
- Written by: Craig Titley
- Cinematography by: Allan Westbrook
- Editing by: Eric Litman
- Original air date: March 15, 2016
- Running time: 43 minutes

Guest appearances
- Powers Boothe as Gideon Malick; Brian Patrick Wade as Carl Creel; Mark Dacascos as Giyera; Gabriel Salvador as Lucio; Ravil Isyanov as Anton Petrov; Adrian Pasdar as Glenn Talbot

Episode chronology
← Previous "Bouncing Back"	Next → "Parting Shot"
- Agents of S.H.I.E.L.D. season 3

"The Inside Man" is the twelfth episode of the third season of the American television series Agents of S.H.I.E.L.D. Based on the Marvel Comics organization S.H.I.E.L.D., it follows Phil Coulson and his team of S.H.I.E.L.D. agents as they hunt for a Hydra impostor. It is set in the Marvel Cinematic Universe (MCU) and acknowledges the franchise's films. The episode was written by Craig Titley, and directed by John Terlesky.

Clark Gregg reprises his role as Coulson from the film series, and is joined by series regulars Ming-Na Wen, Brett Dalton, Chloe Bennet, Iain De Caestecker, Elizabeth Henstridge, Nick Blood, Adrianne Palicki, and Luke Mitchell.

"The Inside Man" originally aired on ABC on March 15, 2016, and according to Nielsen Media Research, was watched by 2.94 million viewers.

== Plot ==
Phil Coulson approaches Glenn Talbot, who has been ignoring his efforts to contact him, to prepare for an international symposium in Taiwan, to discuss how to deal with the Inhumans. Keeping an eye on them, Melinda May and Lincoln Campbell intervene when Carl Creel unexpectedly appears, overpowering him, but Talbot reveals that Creel's Hydra brainwashing has been undone, and he is now Talbot's bodyguard. Jemma Simmons tests Creel's blood and discovers that mixing it with that of an inactive Inhuman prevents Terrigen from affecting the blood, meaning that Creel's blood could be used to synthesize a "vaccine" to remove the alien gene from dormant Inhumans. This causes an argument between Lincoln, who supports the idea of the vaccine, and Daisy Johnson, who believes Terrigenesis is the birthright of all Inhumans, good or evil. Daisy and Lincoln later reconcile and have sex.

Despite Lance Hunter's vociferous protests, Coulson agrees to let Creel accompany him and Talbot to the symposium the next day, with Coulson acting as an expert in Inhuman biology. May, Hunter and Bobbi Morse, will be working to find out if any of the other delegates are working with Gideon Malick, as Coulson suspects, by going into their separate suites. Russian delegate Anton Petrov suggests setting up a sanctuary state for Inhumans, an idea that most of the delegates support, though some fear that the Inhumans could unite against the human race, while Coulson suspects Malick could collect Inhumans from the proposed sanctuary to rebuild his army. Breaking into the Australian delegate's room, Morse learns that she has a captive Inhuman named Eden Fesi. Hunter notices Creel leaving his guard post outside and follows him to a truck, where he discovers armed Hydra agents guarding an Advanced Threat Containment Unit (ATCU) stasis chamber, which contains Talbot's son, George. It is revealed that Malick had kidnapped George to blackmail Talbot, who interrupts the symposium to accuse Coulson of being a Hydra infiltrator. Malick manages to convince the delegates to believe in his deeds based on his past reputation, and he double-crosses Talbot, and tries to have him and Coulson killed. Creel rescues them, while Hunter, May, and Morse defeat the Hydra agents. May rescues George, to Talbot's relief, while other agents retrieve Fesi from Australian custody, and Hunter and Morse are sent to pursue Malick.

The ancient Inhuman ensures that Giyera and Lucio are loyal to him, and sends them to abduct five humans, whom he kills gruesomely, absorbing their life force to restore Grant Ward's body to full strength. In an end tag, Hunter and Morse stow away on Malick's private jet as he leaves with Petrov.

== Production ==
=== Development ===
In February 2016, Marvel announced that the twelfth episode of the season would be titled "The Inside Man", to be written by executive producer Craig Titley, with John Terlesky directing.

=== Casting ===
In February 2016, Marvel revealed that main cast members Clark Gregg, Ming-Na Wen, Brett Dalton, Chloe Bennet, Iain De Caestecker, Elizabeth Henstridge, Nick Blood, Adrianne Palicki, Henry Simmons, and Luke Mitchell would star as Phil Coulson, Melinda May, Hive, Daisy Johnson, Leo Fitz, Jemma Simmons, Lance Hunter, Bobbi Morse, Alphonso "Mack" Mackenzie, and Lincoln Campbell, respectively. It was also revealed that the episode's guest cast would include Powers Boothe as Gideon Malick, Mark Dacascos as Giyera, Adrian Pasdar as Brigadier General Glenn Talbot, Raquel Gardner as Carla Talbot, Brian Patrick Wade as Carl Creel, Ravil Isyanov as Anton Petrov, Melissa Bickerton as Ellen King, Bayo Akinfemi as Nathi Zuma, Alexandra Chun as Xiao Chen, Tohoru Masamune as Haruto Yakimura and Gabriel Salvador as Lucio. Bickerton, Akinfemi, Chun, and Masamune did not receive guest star credit in the episode. Boothe, Dacascos, Pasdar, Gardner, Wade, and Salvador reprise their roles from earlier in the series. Despite being credited, Henry Simmons did not ultimately appear.

=== Filming ===
The sequence in which Dalton as the Inhuman Hive, possessing Grant Ward, is naked and covered in goo, was inspired by images of people covered in honey that reminded the showrunners of a birth. Dalton was given two weeks notice to prepare for the scene, particularly to get in the best shape he could. The goo used was made from methylcellulose, and "they had vats of it and they had different viscosity for different ones, so there were three ones. There was one that was really slippery, one that was kind of thick," Dalton explained.

== Broadcast ==
"The Inside Man" was first aired in the United States on ABC on March 15, 2016.

== Reception ==
=== Ratings ===
In the United States the episode received a 1.0/3 percent share among adults between the ages of 18 and 49, meaning that it was seen by 1.0 percent of all households, and 3 percent of all of those watching television at the time of the broadcast. It was watched by 2.94 million viewers.
