= Gina's Laughing Gear =

British sketch comedy programme

- Genre: Comedy; Children's
- Starring: Gina Yashere
- Country of origin: United Kingdom
- Original language: English
- No. of seasons: 1
- No. of episodes: 10

Original release
- Network: BBC
- Release: 12 January – 23 March 2007

Gina's Laughing Gear was a special programming slot which was presented by Gina Yashere. It was shown on Friday afternoons on BBC One and repeated on Saturday on the CBBC Channel. The purpose was to showcase new CBBC comedy at the time.

The running gag in the slot was that Gina "hacks" the CBBC transmission in her claim to try to be a CBBC presenter. She often made desperate attempts to win over the audience, none of which were very effective.

== Episodes ==
=== Series 1 (2007) ===
No.	Title	Original release date	Prod. code
1	"Harry Batt"	12 January 2007	1.1
Pilot episode. Based on a character from Dick and Dom in da Bugalow.
2	"Spoof!"	19 January 2007	1.2
A sketch show from the producers of Dead Ringers.
3	"Driving Me Mad"	26 January 2007	1.3
Sketch show with a similar aspect to Stupid! in which 2 children imagine the life of people they see from outside the car window.
4	"Lil Sisters"	2 February 2007	1.4
Comedy drama about 3 sisters who go to live with their half brother.
5	"Astronuts"	9 February 2007	1.5
Comedy slapstick about a family in the year 5050 who, after their father's stupidity in moving planet, find themselves lost in space.
6	"Trevor Island"	16 February 2007	1.6
Seafaring comedy drama about a group of pathetic pirates, led by Captain Trevor Mullet, who are left shipwrecked on a desert island with a stowaway.
7	"Life in the Underpass"	23 February 2007	1.7
Kevin wants to be the next David Attenborough, but doesn't have a camera so has to pretend he's filming.
8	"Dollby City"	2 March 2007	1.8
Show set in an imaginary Toy Hospital, based on Casualty and Holby City and dealing with an outbreak of Scilly ASS.
9	"Who's in the Shed?"	16 March 2007	1.9
Two young children host an internet chat show from a garden shed.
10	"Stairlift to Heaveen"	23 March 2007	1.10
An animated comedy by Howard Read, where a 9-year-old boy gets sent to live in an old folks home after an administrative mix-up.
