= Busted Life =

2014 drama film

- Directed by: Bayo Akinfemi
- Produced by: Austin Chima
- Starring: Ramsey Nouah; Chet Anekwe; Sarah Fasha
- Cinematography: Black Magic Tim
- Production company: Chima Movie Empire
- Release date: 2014
- Countries: Nigeria; United States
- Language: English

Busted Life is a 2014 Nigerian-American drama film directed by Bayo Akinfemi and produced by Austin Chima. It stars Chet Anekwe and Ramsey Nouah as Femi and Uzor, two African immigrants whose friendship is tested while living in the United States. The film is based on a true story by Chima and depicts the activities of a drug cartel. Principal photography began in early 2010 and post-production was completed in 2014. Black Magic Tim served as cinematographer and has worked on several other Nollywood USA films. Busted Life was screened at film festivals and received limited theatrical releases internationally.

== Cast ==
- Ramsey Nouah as Uzor
- Chet Anekwe as Femi
- Sarah Fasha as Sheryl
- Ron Bush as Chief Scott
- Pascal Atuma as The Clerk
- Koby Maxwell as Mr. Max

=== Nominations ===
- 2014 NAFCAwards: Best Drama Diaspora Film

=== Awards ===
- 2014 NAFCAwards: Best Drama Diaspora Film
