= Shola Adewusi =

British actress

- Known for: Small Prophets (2026)

Shola Adewusi is a British actress.

Her television work includes Little Miss Jocelyn, My Hero, The Bill, Casualty, Bad Girls, Family Affairs, Emmerdale, and Chewing Gum. She had a main role in CBS's Bob Hearts Abishola as Auntie Olu.

She has also acted in a number of radio productions for the BBC World Service. She is a member of staff at the Intermission Youth Theatre. She played a cameo part in their hit play Verona Road.

Her film work also includes a role in Paddington 2.

== Filmography ==
=== Film ===
Year	Title	Role	Notes
2007	London	Bag Lady	Short film
2011	Ra.One	Airport Cop	
2012	Quartet	Sheryl	
2013	Death of a Pet	Jemima	Short film
2013	The New Start	Landlady	Short film
2014	A Long Way Down	Gladys	
2014	The Riot Club	Hospital Receptionist	
2015	Miss You Already	Midwife	
2017	Hip Hop Cafe	Marge	Short film
2017	Paddington 2	First Ms Peters	
2017	Our Father	Kathy	Short film
2018	Christopher Robin	Rosemary Hopwood	Uncredited
2018	Mirette	Chanteuse	Short film
2019	Rocks	Grandmother Omotoso (voice)	
2020	Latham	Stephanie	
2021	Lions Men	Danna	Short film
2021	Merry Wives	Mama Quickly	
2024	Babes	Nanny Dani	

=== Television ===
Year	Title	Role	Notes
2015	The Kennedys	Dee Palmer	Main role
2018	Emmerdale	Bonnie	
2019–2024	Bob Hearts Abishola	Oluwatoyin "Olu" Ifedayo Olatunji	Main role
2026	Can You Keep a Secret?	Billie	4 episodes
2026	Wonder Man	Martha Williams	3 episodes
2026	Small Prophets	Olive	4 episodes
