= Maribeth Monroe =

American actress, writer and comedian

- Born: March 25, 1978 (age 48); Fraser, Michigan, U.S.
- Occupation: Actress
- Years active: 1998–present
- Known for: Workaholics
- Spouse: Andy Cobb (m. 2014)
- Children: 1

Maribeth Monroe (born March 25, 1978) is an American actress, writer and comedian. She is known for portraying Alice Murphy on Comedy Central's sitcom Workaholics, Mindy St. Claire on NBC's sitcom The Good Place, and Christina Wheeler on CBS's sitcom Bob Hearts Abishola.

She has also appeared in the films The Back-up Plan (2010), Keeping Up with the Joneses (2016), Downsizing (2017), and Jumanji: Welcome to the Jungle (2017).

== Career ==
Monroe performed at The Second City, both on the Chicago and Detroit stages. In Chicago, she appeared in the 2004 revue Red Scare, directed by Mick Napier, where the character "Sassy Gay Friend" originated, and she would later appear as Desdemona in one of the character's online incarnations.

She has appeared in episodes of The Neighbors, Parks and Recreation, The Big Bang Theory, The Brink, According to Jim, Hannah Montana, Maron, Modern Family, Key & Peele and the web series Cowgirl Up. In 2010, she appeared in the romantic comedy film The Back-up Plan. In fall 2012, she appeared in Applebee's commercials with ESPN host Chris Berman. In 2014, Monroe began appearing in commercials for La Quinta Inns & Suites and E-Trade, with Kevin Spacey.

From 2017 to 2020, Monroe had a recurring role as Mindy St. Claire on the NBC sitcom The Good Place and in 2019 began appearing as Christina Wheeler on the CBS sitcom Bob Hearts Abishola.

== Filmography ==
Film roles
Year	Title	Role	Notes
1998	All of It	Baby Shower Friend	
2000	Garage: A Rock Saga	Claudia	
2003	Down Into Happiness	Molly	
2006	I Want Someone to Eat Cheese With	Second City Actor	
2008	Birthmark	Mom	Short film
2008	The Professional Interview	Mary	Short film
2009	The Strip	DVD Customer Woman	
2010	Successful Alcoholics	Lindsay's Coworker	
2010	The Back-up Plan	Lori	
2015	Chronic	Sarah's Niece	
2016	Keeping Up with the Joneses	Meg Craverston	
2017	Downsizing	Carol Johnson	
2017	Jumanji: Welcome to the Jungle	Teacher	

Television roles
Year	Title	Role	Notes
2007	Andy Barker, P.I.	Daphne Overbrook	Episode: "The Big No Sleep"
2007	Thank God You're Here	Ensemble	7 episodes
2007–08	According to Jim	Mary Beth / Shopper / Helen	4 episodes
2008	Chocolate News	Lainie Wainscott-Merkeson	Episode: "Episode #1.6"
2009	Hannah Montana	White House Guide	Episode: "Would I Lie to You, Lilly?"
2010	Good Luck Charlie	Dana	Episode: "Kit and Kaboodle"
2010, 2015	Parks and Recreation	Elise Yarktin	Episodes: "Woman of the Year" (2010), "Pie-Mary" (2015)
2011	Cowgirl Up	Merideth	6 episodes
2011–17	Workaholics	Alice Murphy	53 episodes
2012	A Guy Walks Into a Bar	Woman	Episode: "Best Lovers"
2012	Couchers	Nancy	Episodes: "The Mall Walker Lady: Part 1", "The Mall Walker Lady: Part 2"
2012	Harder Than It Looks	Judith	Episode: "Back to the Grind"
2012	Key & Peele	Dance Judge	Episodes: "Episode #2.1", "Episode #2.2"
2012	The Neighbors	Rebecca Hill	Episode: "Larry Bird and the Iron Throne"
2013	Modern Family	Maggie	Episode: "Bad Hair Day"
2013	Maron	Justine	Episode: "Dominatrix"
2014	Robot Chicken	Wife / Bessy the Cow (voice)	Episode: "The Hobbit: There and Bennigan's"
2015	The Brink	Kendra Peterson	10 episodes
2016	Bad Internet	N/A	Episode: "Amazon Foresight"
2016	Adam Ruins Everything	Kheather	Episodes: "Adam Ruins Immigration", "Adam Ruins Housing"
2016	World's End	Suzanne	Television film
2017	Bajillion Dollar Propertie$	Merry Capshaw	Episode: "Disaster Drills"
2017–20	The Good Place	Mindy St. Claire	8 episodes
2018	Teachers	Paula	Episode: "Leggo My Preggo"
2018	Detroiters	Reilly Clair	Episode: "Little Caesars"
2018	The Big Bang Theory	Dr. Lee	Episode: "The Grant Allocation Derivation"
2019	Crazy Ex-Girlfriend	April	3 episodes
2019–24	Bob Hearts Abishola	Christina Wheeler	Main role
2024	Hailey's On It!	Ms. Ohlson (voice)	Episode: "Full House (of Bugs)"
