= Travis Wolfe Jr. =

American actor (born 2006)

- Born: April 16, 2006 (age 20)
- Occupation: Actor
- Years active: 2015 – present

Travis Wolfe Jr. (born April 16, 2006) is an American television actor. He is best known for portraying Dele Adebambo, one of the main characters in the CBS sitcom television series Bob Hearts Abishola (2019–2024). He also appeared in the television series The Neighborhood (2019), Grown-ish (2019), Raven's Home (2019–2020), and That Girl Lay Lay (2022).

== Biography ==
Travis Wolfe Jr. was born on April 16, 2006. He grew up in the northeast portion of the city of Philadelphia in Pennsylvania, United States. At the age of 13, Wolfe and his family moved to Los Angeles, California. He begun acting in the early childhood, at the age of either 7 or 8. One of his first appearances on screen was in 2015, in the Investigation Discovery true-crime television series The Mind of a Murderer. He later also appeared in the CBS sitcom series The Neighborhood (2019), the Freeform teen comedy drama series Grown-ish (2019), and the Disney Channel family sitcom series Raven's Home (2019–2020), as well as the 2017 drama film Beyond My Skin. Later, Wolfe starred as Dele Adebambo, one of the main characters in the CBS sitcom television series Bob Hearts Abishola (2019–2024). In its fifth and final season, he was reduced to the recurring cast. He also appeared in the Nickelodeon comedy television series That Girl Lay Lay (2022), and portrayed Dre, one of the main characters in the FX drama television pilot Me/We (2024).

== Filmography ==
=== Film ===
| Year | Title | Role | Notes |
|---|---|---|---|
| 2015 | Contender | Zane | Short film |
| 2015 | Sore Eyes | Classmate | Short film |
| 2016 | Help Wanted | Fang | Short film |
| 2016 | Shadow in the Shade | Older Isaiah | Short film |
| 2016 | Skin | Father | Short film; voice |
| 2016 | Theatre and Me's the Bully | Boy at John's funeral | Feature film |
| 2017 | Beyond My Skin | Student | Feature film |
| 2017 | I See Jesus | Emmanuel Kennedy | Short film |
| 2019 | Bruce | Art class child | Feature film |
| 2019 | Reece | Riq | Short film |
| 2025 | ReCovering | Omar | Short film |

=== Television ===
| Year | Title | Role | Notes |
|---|---|---|---|
| 2015 | The Mind of a Murderer | Lil' Titus | Episode: "Rage and Rampage" |
| 2016–2018 | FTS Kids News | Himself (reporter) | News show; web series; 4 episodes |
| 2018 | Laff Mobb's Laff Tracks | Lil' Mike | Episode: "Back in the Day" |
| 2019 | The Neighborhood | Child #1 | Episode: "Welcome to the Repass" |
| 2019 | Grown-ish | Basketball boy | Episode: "Self Care" |
| 2019–2020 | Raven's Home | Lil' Lo-Lo | 3 episodes |
| 2019–2024 | Bob Hearts Abishola | Dele Adebambo | Main character; 62 episodes |
| 2022 | That Girl Lay Lay | Gabe Alexander | Episode: "Fami-Lay-Lay-Reunion" |
| 2024 | Me/We | Dre | Main character; episode: "Pilot" |
| 2025 | Girl Talk | Himself (guest) | Talk show; episode: "Boy Besties feat. Lev, Walker, Joshua, Travis" |
