= Gina Yashere =

British comedian and writer (born 1974)

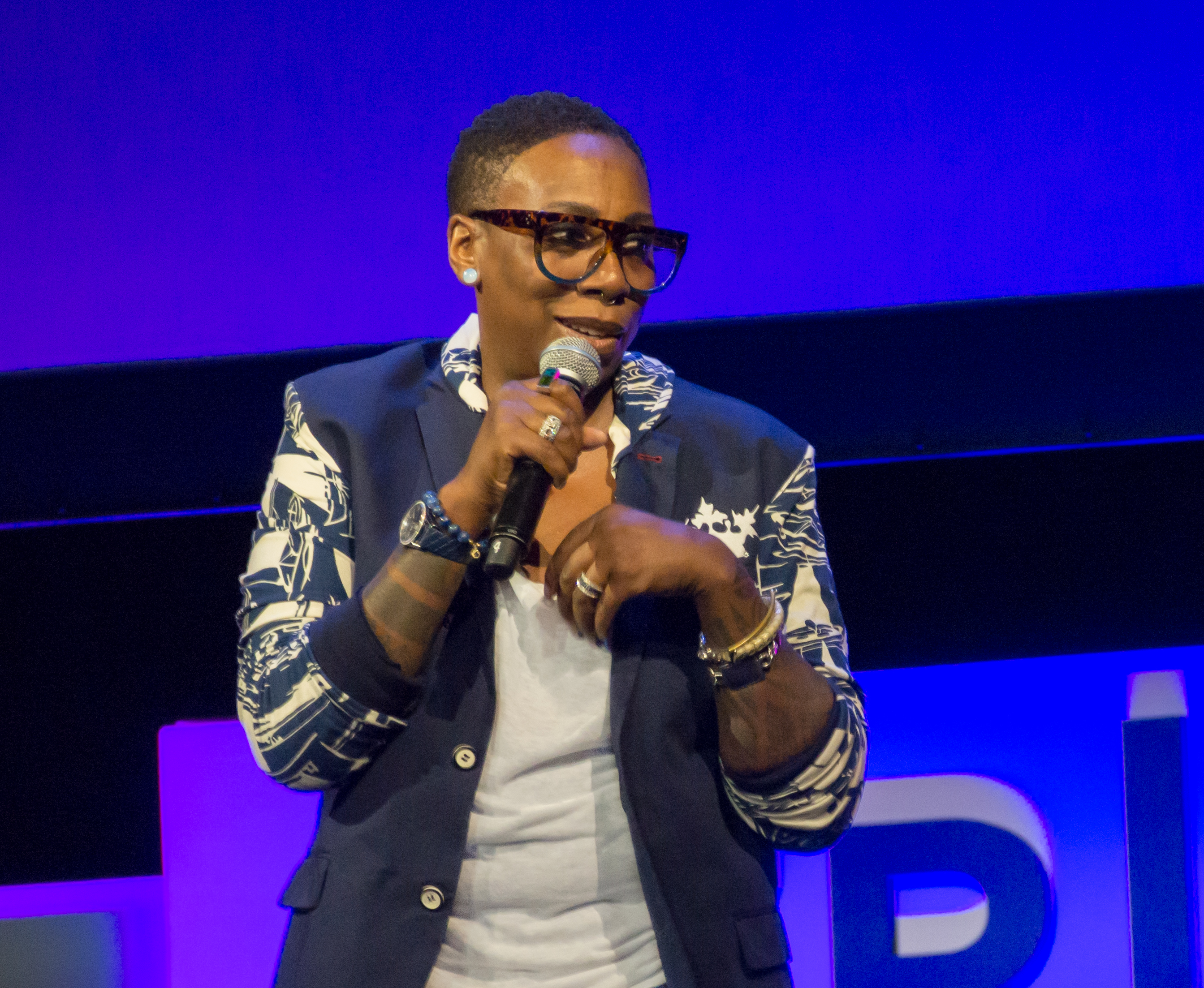
- Yashere at the Tribeca Film Festival in 2018
- Born: Regina Obedapo Iyashere; 6 April 1974 (age 52); Bethnal Green, London, England
- Spouse: Nina Rose Fischer (m. 2026)

Comedy career
- Years active: 1996–present
- Medium: Stand-up; television; film
- Genres: Social satire; character comedy; observational comedy
- Subjects: Pop culture; race; stereotypes; current events
- Website: ginayashere.com

Regina Obedapo Iyashere (born 6 April 1974), known professionally as Gina Yashere, is a British comedian, actress and writer who has made numerous appearances on British and American television. She co-created the American sitcom Bob Hearts Abishola, on which she played a supporting role.

== Early life ==
Yashere was born and raised in Bethnal Green, London to Nigerian parents. Before becoming a comedian, she worked as a lift maintenance technician and engineer—becoming the first woman to reach this position in the company—all of which she mentions in her stand-up routine.

She uses the surname "Yashere" due to encountering common mispronunciation of her original surname.

== Career ==
Yashere was a finalist in the Hackney Empire New Act of the Year competition in 1996. She has appeared in a number of television programmes, including the Black-British Caribbean comedy series The Lenny Henry Show, where she played Tanya and Mrs Omokorede, the pushy Nigerian mum. She voiced Keisha on the animated series Bromwell High. In 2005, she appeared on the reality television series Comic Relief Does Fame Academy, in aid of Comic Relief, and she co-hosted the 2006 and 2007 MOBO Awards alongside 2Baba and Coolio. She made numerous appearances on Mock the Week, and appeared on the CBBC show Gina's Laughing Gear.

In 2007, Yashere was featured on the reality show Last Comic Standing, auditioning in Sydney. She was among the ten finalists, but on 1 August 2007, she and Dante were the first two finalists eliminated.

In 2008, she became the first Briton to perform on Def Comedy Jam. On 3 September 2009, she appeared on The Tonight Show with Conan O'Brien and performed a stand-up comedy routine. On 24 December, she appeared on Live at the Apollo. She appeared twice on the short-lived primetime show The Jay Leno Show: on 21 October 2009, a video of Yashere showed her giving free fortune-telling readings to passers-by, and on 25 November 2009, she operated a walk-in psychic booth. Starting in 2010, she appeared semi-regularly on The Tonight Show with Jay Leno, in a sketch comedy series called Madame Yashere: The Surly Psychic.

In 2010, Yashere appeared as Flo in several episodes of the ITV drama Married Single Other. In April 2010, her one-hour comedy special, Skinny B*tch, premiered on Showtime, a US cable channel. She appeared on the Watch TV show Scream If You Know the Answer with contestant Emily Green from Portsmouth. She helped Green win the show with a prize fund of £2,000. In 2012, she was featured on the second season of the Comedy Central series Gabriel Iglesias Presents Stand Up Revolution. In 2013, Yashere appeared in an advert for Tesco Mobile. In 2015, she was featured as a selected comic on Gotham Comedy Live, which airs on AXS TV (season 4-Judah Friedlander) where she referred to the City of Cleveland, Ohio as "shit." On 8 January 2016, she appeared on The Nasty Show with Artie Lange, which aired on Showtime.

Starting on 16 March 2017, Yashere began a brief stint as the British correspondent for The Daily Show.

In September 2019, Yashere began appearing in a supporting role on the 2019 Chuck Lorre CBS sitcom, Bob Hearts Abishola, which Lorre created with Yashere. Yashere wrote and was a co-showrunner for the program and played Folake Olowofoyeku's character, Abishola's best friend, Kemi. Bob Hearts Abishola was the first American sitcom to feature a Nigerian family.

== Personal life ==
Yashere is a lesbian. Until 2025, she was primarily residing in Altadena, California, with her partner Nina Rose Fischer. The couple were living at their second house in Costa Rica, when the Eaton Fire destroyed the Altadena home. Yashere lost important personal possessions, including comedy notebooks. As of July 2025, they were no longer residing in the U.S., dividing their time between Costa Rica and Toronto, where Yashere was filming Star Trek: Starfleet Academy.

In April 2026, Yashere and Fischer were married in Costa Rica.

== Filmography ==
=== Film ===
| Year | Title | Role | Notes |
|---|---|---|---|
| 2001 | Kiss Kiss (Bang Bang) | Polythene Pam | |
| 2001 | Mr In-Between | Dancing Woman | |
| 2008 | The Time of the End | The Messiah | Short film |
| 2016 | The Comedian's Guide to Survival | Herself | |
| 2018 | Early Man | Gravelle | Voice |
| 2022 | Stand Out: An LGBTQ+ Celebration | Herself | |

=== Television ===
| Year | Title | Role | Notes |
|---|---|---|---|
| 1996–2000 | Blouse and Skirt | Herself | 21 episodes |
| 1999 | The Richard Blackwood Show | — | Writer |
| 2000 | Lenny Henry in Pieces | — | |
| 2005–2015 | The Wright Stuff | Herself / Guest Panelist | 4 episodes |
| 2005 | The Crouches | Mrs. Ubakema | Episode: "No Place Like Home" |
| 2005 | Bromwell High | Keisha Marie (voice) | 13 episodes |
| 2006–2009 | Mock the Week | Herself | 8 episodes |
| 2007 | Gina's Laughing Gear | Gina | 10 episodes |
| 2008 | Brits Abroad: Gina's Got the Ticket | Host | TV movie |
| 2008 | Def Comedy Jam | Writer | Episode: "Episode #8.1" |
| 2008 | Gina Yashere: Skinny B*tch | Herself | Stand-up special, Showtime |
| 2009 | Just for Laughs | Writer | Episode: "Martin Short" |
| 2009 | Live at the Apollo | Herself | Episode: "Episode #5.5" |
| 2010 | Married Single Other | Flo | 4 episodes |
| 2010 | 1st Amendment Stand Up | Writer | Episode: "Darren Carter/Gina Yashere/Damon Williams" |
| 2013–2014 | Gotham Comedy Live | Herself | 2 episodes |
| 2014 | Gina Yashere: Laughing To America | Herself | Stand-up special, Starz |
| 2014 | Comics Unleashed | Herself | 2 episodes |
| 2015–2017 | @midnight | Herself | 5 episodes; representing the United Kingdom |
| 2015 | The Nightly Show with Larry Wilmore | Herself / Panelist | 2 episodes |
| 2015 | Just for Laughs: All-Access | Herself | Episode: "Episode #3.9" |
| 2015 | The Nasty Show Hosted by Artie Lange | Herself | |
| 2016 | Sir Patrick Stewart: A Knight of Comedy | Herself | |
| 2016 | Go 8 Bit | Herself | Episode: "Episode #1.2" |
| 2016 | Debate Wars | Herself | Episode: "Babies Vs. Old People" |
| 2016 | Black Is the New Black | Herself | |
| 2016 | Live at the Apollo | Herself / Host | Episode: "Episode #12.3" |
| 2017–2018 | The Daily Show with Trevor Noah | Commentator | 4 episodes |
| 2017 | Crashing | Gina | Episode: "Artie Lange" |
| 2017 | Celebrity Chase | Contestant | Episode: "Episode #7.7" |
| 2017 | What's Your F@#King Deal?! | Herself | Episode: "Dante Nero, Gina Yashere and Eddie Pepitone" |
| 2018 | The Standups with Gina Yashere | Herself | Stand-up special, Netflix |
| 2018 | West:Word | Herself | Episode: "Vanishing Point" |
| 2018–2019 | Laff Mobb's Laff Tracks | Herself | 2 episodes |
| 2019–2023 | The Rubbish World of Dave Spud | Gareth | 84 episodes |
| 2019–2024 | Bob Hearts Abishola | Kemi | 90 episodes; also co-creator, executive producer and writer |
| 2021 | The Barbarian and the Troll | Axe | 12 episodes |
| 2022 | The Neighborhood | Chika | Episode: "Welcome to the Ring" |
| 2024 | Would I Lie to You? | Herself | Series 17, Episode 5 |
| 2026 | Star Trek: Starfleet Academy | Lura Thok | Recurring role |
