= Bayo Akinfemi =

Nigerian actor and director (born 1969)

- Born: October 3, 1969 (age 56); Ilesa, Nigeria,
- Education: Toronto Film School; University of Ilorin; University of Southern California
- Occupations: Actor, director
- Years active: 2001–present

Bayo Akinfemi (Yoruba: Báyọ̀ Akínfẹ́mi; born October 3, 1969) is a Nigerian film and television actor, and film, television, and theatre director. He is best known for portraying Goodwin Aderibigbe Olayiwola, one of the main characters in the CBS sitcom series Bob Hearts Abishola (2019–2024), also directing two of its episodes. He was also nominated twice for the Gemini Award in the best actor category for his roles as Moses, one of the mains characters in the CBC drama miniseries Human Cargo in 2004, and as Suliman Adeen, an episodic secondary character in the CBC crime drama series The Border in 2008. Akinfemi also appeared in the feature films The Tuxedo (2002), and Bulletproof Monk (2003), and in the television series Criminal Minds (2015), Survivor's Remorse (2015), and Agents of S.H.I.E.L.D. (2016). He also directed two Nigerian-made films, the 2011 romantic mystery film Paparazzi: Eye in the Dark, and the 2014 drama film Busted Life. Akinfemi is also a theatre director. Originating from Ilesa, Nigeria, he is currently based in Los Angeles in California, United States, and previously lived and worked in Toronto, Canada. Akinfemi is an assistant professor of theatre practice in acting at the USC School of Dramatic Arts in Los Angeles.

== Biography ==
Bayo Akinfemi was born on October 3, 1969, in Ilesa, Nigeria. He obtained a bachelor's degree in performing arts from the University of Ilorin. In 1998, he moved to Toronto, Canada, to pursuit an acting career. Akinfemi also studied film and television production at the Toronto Film School. He worked as a production assistant, and later, as an assistant director, in numerous film productions in Toronto. Among his first acting roles, he portrayed secondary characters in the 2002 science fiction action comedy film The Tuxedo, and in the 2003 action comedy film Bulletproof Monk. He was also nominated twice for the Gemini Award in the best actor category, for his roles as Moses, one of the mains characters in the CBC drama miniseries Human Cargo in 2004, and as Suliman Adeen, an episodic secondary character in the CBC crime drama series The Border in 2008. Akinfemi also directed numerous plays in theatres in Toronto, including being a regular director at the AfriCan Theatre Ensemble for over a decade.

In the late 2000s, while in his 40s, Akinfemi moved to Los Angeles in California, United States, where he obtained a master's degree in cinema and media studies at the University of Southern California. He had episodic secondary roles in the television series such as Criminal Minds (2015), Survivor's Remorse (2015), and Agents of S.H.I.E.L.D. (2016). Akinfemi also directed two Nigerian-made films, the 2011 romantic mystery film Paparazzi: Eye in the Dark, and the 2014 drama film Busted Life. In 2019, he was cast as one of the secondary characters of the CBS American sitcom series Bob Hearts Abishola, Goodwin Aderibigbe Olayiwola, being promoted to the main cast in 2020. In the final 5th season, aired in 2024, his character was reduced to a recurring role. Akinfemi also directed two of its episodes, and worked as a Yoruba and Nigerian culture consultant and dialect coach for Nigerian English and Yoruba.

Akinfemi works as an assistant professor of theatre practice in acting at the USC School of Dramatic Arts in Los Angeles. He is also the founder and artistic director of African Theatre Artistes Society (ATARS), a not-for-profit organisation based in Los Angeles, dedicated to providing a platform of artistic expression in the city to performing artists of African descent. In 2022, he directed play Wedlock of the Gods in the Bing Theatre at the USC School of Dramatic Arts, showcasing traditional Nigerian music, culture and folklore.

== Personal life ==
He has a wife and two children.

== Filmography ==
=== Films ===
Year	Title	Role	Notes
2002	The Tuxedo	CSA SWAT operative	Feature film
2003	Bulletproof Monk	Shade	Feature film
2008	The Barber of Kigali	Barber	Short film
2010	Champagne	James	Short film
2011	Paparazzi: Eye in the Dark	Pat	Feature film; also director
2012	Buried Treasure	Geocacher	Short film; also second assistant director
2014	Busted Life	—N/a	Feature film; director
2015	Gabriel	No data	Short film
2016	Rump	—N/a	Short film; director, producer, and screenwriter
2019	Prom Night at the Vagabond	—N/a	Short film; faculty advisor
2022	Season of Expectations	Christopher Chavous	Short film
2024	A Guest in My Country	Dembe Odongo	Short film
2024	Sardinia	News reader	Short film
2025	Ogun Oru	Dr. Oyesanya	Short film

=== Television series ===
Year	Title	Role	Notes
2001	Soul Food	Nigerian panel member	Episode: "I'm Afraid of Americans"
2003	Blue Murder	Dr. Paul Leyton	Episode: "Necklace"
2004	Human Cargo	Moses	3 episodes
2004	This Is Wonderland	No data	Episode no. 10
2005	Mayday	Air traffic controller	Episode: "Ocean Landing"
2005	Puppets Who Kill	Man	Episode: "Cuddles the Artist"
2008	The Border	Suliman Adeen	Episode: "Family Values"
2008	Friends and Heroes	No data	Voice; episode: "Gladiator School"
2008	M.V.P.	Cabbie	Episode: "Cover Your Man"
2008	Testees	Physician	Episode: "Herfume"
2009	Crash & Burn	Norman	Episode: "Sunday, Bloody Sunday"
2011	Love, Hate & Propaganda: The Cold War	Himself	Documentary series; voice; episode: "Turning Up the Heat"
2014	Newsreaders	Interpreter	Episode: "The Journey of an iPhone; Restaurant Plague"
2015	Criminal Minds	Nurse	Episode: "The Hunt"
2015	Survivor's Remorse	Abeo	Episode: "Grown-Ass Man"
2016	Agents of S.H.I.E.L.D.	Nathi Zuma	Episode: "The Inside Man"
2018	Unofficially: Home	Jermaine	Episode: "New Beginnings"
2019–2024	Bob Hearts Abishola	Goodwin Aderibigbe Olayiwola	Main role; 79 episodes
2021–2024	Bob Hearts Abishola	—N/a	Consultant and dialect coach; 42 episodes
2022–2024	Bob Hearts Abishola	—N/a	Director; 2 episodes
2022	USC Comedy LIVE!	Himself	Episode aired on April 1, 2022

=== Video games ===
Year	Title	Role	Notes
2008	Far Cry 2	Additional voices	Voice

== Accolades and nominations ==
Awards and nominations received by Abelard Giza
Award	Year	Category	Nominated work	Result	Ref.
Africa Movie Academy Awards	2012	Best Film By An African Living Aboard	Paparazzi: Eye in the Dark	Nominated	
Gemini Awards	2004	Best Performance by an Actor in a Leading Role in a Dramatic Program or Mini-Series	Human Cargo	Nominated	
Gemini Awards	2008	Best Performance by an Actor in a Guest Role Dramatic Series	The Border	Nominated	
Golden Icons Academy Movie Awards	2012	Best Film Director in Diaspora	Paparazzi: Eye in the Dark	Nominated	
Nollywood and African Film Critics Awards	2011	Best Director in the Diaspora	Paparazzi: Eye in the Dark	Won	
Nollywood and African Film Critics Awards	2011	Best Film	Paparazzi: Eye in the Dark	Nominated	
Nollywood and African Film Critics Awards	2011	Best Film in the Diaspora	Paparazzi: Eye in the Dark	Won	
Nollywood and African Film Critics Awards	2014	Best Drama Diaspora Film	Busted Life	Won	
