= Bradford Young =

American cinematographer

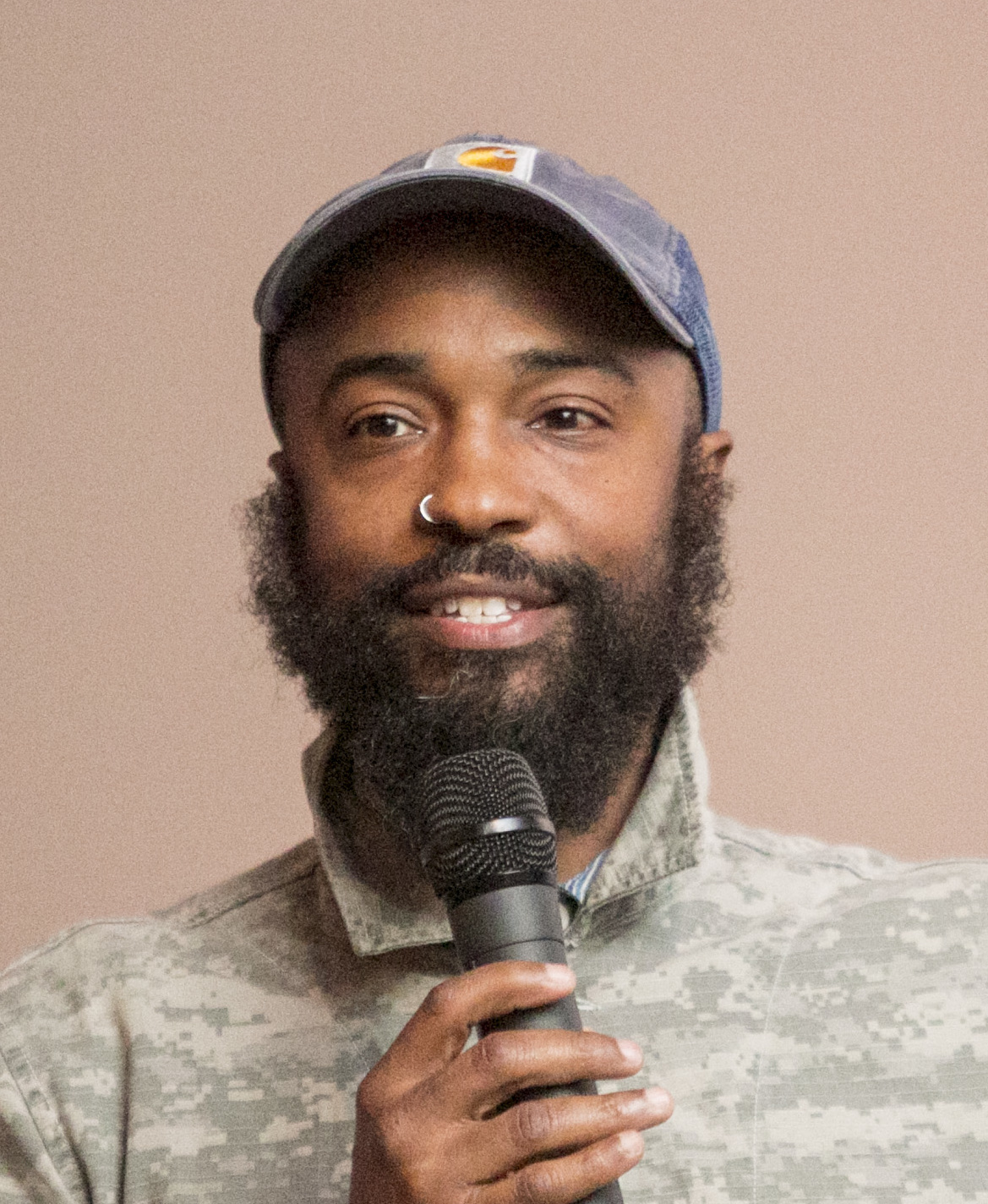
- Young in 2013
- Born: Bradford Marcel Young; July 6, 1977 (age 49); Louisville, Kentucky
- Education: Howard University (BA, MFA)
- Years active: 2004–present
- Spouse: Stephanie Etienne
- Children: 2
- Website: bradfordyoung.com

Bradford Marcel Young, A.S.C (born July 6, 1977) is an American cinematographer.

For his work on Arrival (2016), he became the first African-American to be nominated for the Academy Award for Best Cinematography.

== Background ==
Young spent his early years in Louisville, Kentucky, where he attended The Brown School and Central High School, and then moved to Chicago at age 15 to live with his father.

In his youth, he went to the theater to see Spike Lee films with his family.

Young received early artistic inspiration by the works of Romare Bearden, Jacob Lawrence, and Aaron Douglas. Although he intended to study writing, he studied film at Howard University, where he was influenced by Haile Gerima.

His first film project at Howard was a group project, a black and white silent film shot on a Canon Super 8. Working on set with filmmaking colleagues at Howard was his introduction to film.

Prior to moving to Washington, D.C. for college, Young says "the only reason I cared about movies was how most people cared about movies. I liked watching them."

== Career ==
In 2014, Young was inducted into the American Society of Cinematographers (ASC).

In 2017, Young was nominated for an Academy Award for Best Cinematography for Arrival (2016), along with a nomination for a BAFTA and the American Society of Cinematographers.

Young worked three times with director Ava DuVernay, on Middle of Nowhere (2012), Selma (2014), and the Netflix miniseries When They See Us (2019).

In addition to his feature film work, Young has collaborated with directors Kathryn Bigelow, Derek Cianfrance, Todd Haynes, Spike Jonze, and Steve McQueen on numerous short films and commercials.

He has filmed music videos for artists Beck, Common, Kamasi Washington, MGMT, and Norah Jones. Young has also collaborated with artists Elissa Blount Moorhead and Leslie Hewitt on video installations that have been displayed in fine art museums around the world.

== Personal life ==
Young is married to Stephanie Etienne, who received special thanks in A Most Violent Year.

They currently reside in Baltimore, Maryland with their two sons.

== Visual style ==
Young prefers shooting with available light. In Pariah, for a nighttime bedroom scene, he shot using only Christmas lights and an IKEA lamp with a red lampshade. Amanda Petrusich in her 2012 article on Young for The New York Times states that he "favors raw light and has a penchant for shooting into it, but said he ultimately focuses on getting out of the way."

In a 2013 article from The Washington Post about cinematographers who were trained at Howard University, Hans Charles, a frequent camera assistant for Young said that he has developed a versatile but also consistently poetic, oblique visual style.

In a 2017 article from the Courier Journal, Young is quoted as acknowledging older black cinematographers like Ernest Dickerson (Malcolm X), Arthur Jafa (Daughters of the Dust) and Malik Hassan Sayeed (Clockers) as artists who lay a foundation for black cinematographers like himself. He told the Courier Journal that he was "trying to find that balance between making sure I am present but also being that voice in the wilderness that says 'there has been great work by African-American cinematographers and it's a shame those people who came before me and who have been my teachers were not nominated for awards.'"

Young also cited his childhood memory as a key source of inspiration: "Early on, when I came upon a technical difficulty (making a film), I would think back to my memories of growing up in Louisville and what the lighting was like in those moments. I still do that to this day. I think about my grandmother's house on Greenwood Avenue and scenes during her wonderful parties. Or I envision the light in my Aunt Marie's kitchen. When I am stuck on a technical issue making a film, I access those memories and I know I am doing the right thing." Young has spoken about his affinity for nonlinear storytelling and switching between overhead and handheld camera shots.

== Filmography ==
=== Feature film ===
Year	Title	Director	Notes
2009	Mississippi Damned	Tina Mabry	
2009	Entre nos	Gloria La Morte; Paola Mendoza	
2011	Pariah	Dee Rees	
2011	Restless City	Andrew Dosunmu	
2012	Middle of Nowhere	Ava DuVernay	
2013	Mother of George	Andrew Dosunmu	
2013	Ain't Them Bodies Saints	David Lowery	
2013	Vara: A Blessing	Khyentse Norbu	
2014	Pawn Sacrifice	Edward Zwick	
2014	A Most Violent Year	J. C. Chandor	
2014	Selma	Ava DuVernay	
2016	Arrival	Denis Villeneuve	
2017	Where Is Kyra?	Andrew Dosunmu	
2018	Solo: A Star Wars Story	Ron Howard	
2027	The Thomas Crown Affair †	Michael B. Jordan	Post-production

=== Television ===
Year	Title	Director	Notes
2012	The Boring Life of Jacqueline	Sebastián Silva	All 10 episodes
2019	When They See Us	Ava DuVernay	Miniseries
2024	Adam Sandler: Love You	Josh Safdie	Stand-up special

=== Documentary works ===
Film

Year	Title	Director	Notes
2008	Eventual Salvation	Dee Rees	
2010	The Western Front	Zachary Iscol	With Radha Agrawal
2011	More Than Conquerors	Andre Wilkins	
2012	Free Angela and All Political Prisoners	Shola Lynch	With Sandi Sissel
2015	Everything Is Copy	Jacob Bernstein; Nick Hooker	With Christine Ng
2016	I Called Him Morgan	Kasper Collin	With Erik Vallsten
2024	2073	Asif Kapadia	
2025	BLKNWS: Terms & Conditions	Kahlil Joseph	

TV movies

Year	Title	Director	Notes
2008	Alicia in Africa: Journey to the Motherland	Earle Sebastian	
2010	My Mic Sounds Nice: A Truth About Women and Hip Hop	Ava DuVernay	
2013	Six by Sondheim	Autumn de Wilde	Segment "Send in the Clowns"

TV series

Year	Title	Director	Note
2025	Number One on the Call Sheet	Shola Lynch	Episode "Black Leading Women in Hollywood"

=== Music video ===
Year	Title	Artist	Director	Notes
2013	"Hello, Again"	Beck	Colin K. Gray; Chris Milk	
2013	"Fire We Make"	Alicia Keys feat. Maxwell	Chris Robinson	
2013	"Cool Song No. 2"	MGMT	Isaiah Seret	
2016	"Black America Again"	Common feat. Stevie Wonder	Himself	With Maceo Bishop, Jrr-Kwesi Fanti and Shawn Peters
2021	"For It Shall Perish and Never Leave Us Again"	Leon Bridges	Himself	Also writer

== Awards and nominations ==
Year	Award	Category	Title	Result
2011	Sundance Film Festival	Excellence in Cinematography Award: Dramatic	Pariah	Won
2013	Sundance Film Festival	Cinematography Award: U.S. Dramatic	Ain't Them Bodies Saints	Won
2013	Sundance Film Festival	Cinematography Award: U.S. Dramatic	Mother of George	Won
2014	Independent Spirit Awards	Best Cinematography	Selma	Nominated
2016	Academy Awards	Best Cinematography	Arrival	Nominated
2016	BAFTA Awards	Best Cinematography	Arrival	Nominated
2016	American Society of Cinematographers	Outstanding Cinematography	Arrival	Nominated
2016	Critics' Choice Movie Awards	Best Cinematography	Arrival	Nominated
2016	Florida Film Critics Circle	Best Cinematography	Arrival	Nominated
2016	Houston Film Critics Society	Best Cinematography	Arrival	Nominated
2016	Online Film Critics Society	Best Cinematography	Arrival	Nominated
2016	San Diego Film Critics Society	Best Cinematography	Arrival	Nominated
2016	San Francisco Film Critics Circle	Best Cinematography	Arrival	Nominated
2016	St. Louis Gateway Film Critics Association	Best Cinematography	Arrival	Nominated
2016	Washington D.C. Area Film Critics Association	Best Cinematography	Arrival	Nominated
2019	Primetime Emmy Awards	Outstanding Cinematography	When They See Us	Nominated
