= Danai Gurira =

Zimbabwean-American actress (born 1978)

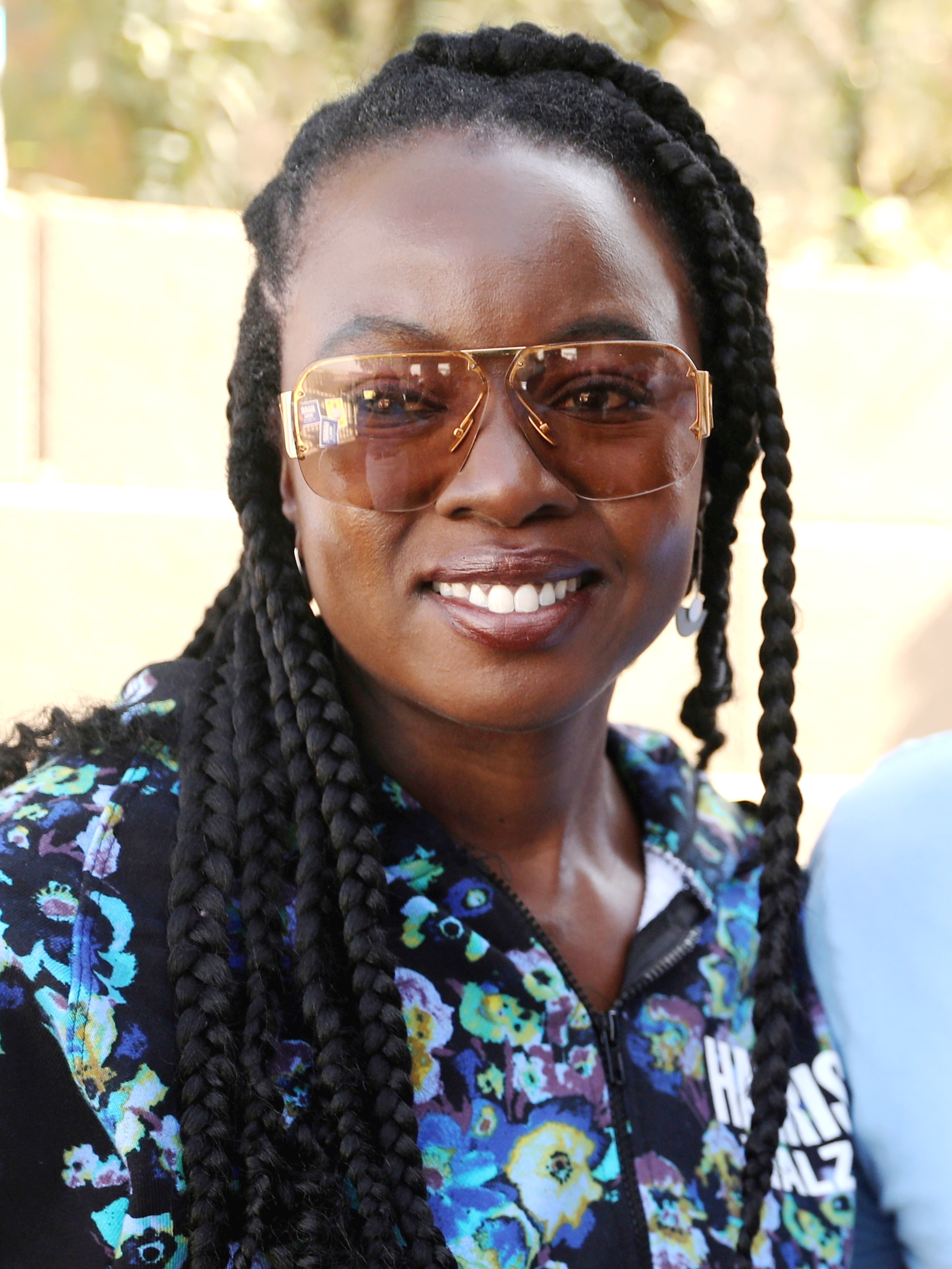
- Gurira during a Kamala Harris for President campaign in 2024.
- Born: Danai Jekesai Gurira; February 14, 1978 (age 48); Grinnell, Iowa, U.S.
- Citizenship: United States; Zimbabwe
- Education: Macalester College (BA); New York University (MFA)
- Occupations: Actress; playwright; screenwriter
- Years active: 2004–present

Danai Jekesai Gurira (/dəˈnaɪ ɡʊˈrɪərə/; born February 14, 1978) is an American-Zimbabwean actress, playwright, screenwriter, producer, and activist. She is best known for her starring roles as Michonne in the AMC horror drama franchise The Walking Dead and Okoye in the Marvel Cinematic Universe. Her films have grossed $6.98 billion, making her the seventh highest-grossing actress of all time.

As a playwright, Gurira wrote the play In the Continuum, for which she won an Obie Award, as well as The Convert, Familiar and Eclipsed, the latter of which was nominated for six Tony Awards, including Best Play. For the screen, she's written an episode of the spin-off The Walking Dead: The Ones Who Live (2024), centered on the characters Michonne and Rick Grimes, which received critical acclaim. For this episode, she received a Black Reel TV Award nomination for Outstanding Writing in a Drama Series.

She has been a UN Women Goodwill Ambassador since 2018, and has founded two non-profit organizations. In 2023, she was honored with the TIME100 Impact Award. She is the founder of the production company Gurazoo Productions, which has an overall television deal with ABC Studios.

== Early life and education ==
Gurira was born on February 14, 1978, in Grinnell, Iowa, to Josephine Gurira, a college librarian, and Roger Gurira, a tenured professor in the Department of Chemistry at Grinnell College (both parents later joined the staff of University of Wisconsin–Platteville). Her parents moved from Southern Rhodesia, which is now Zimbabwe, to the United States in 1964. She is the youngest of four siblings; Shingai and Choni are her sisters and Tare, her brother. Gurira lived in Grinnell until December 1983, when at age five she and her family moved back to Harare, the capital of Zimbabwe, after Robert Mugabe rose to power in 1980.

She attended high school at Dominican Convent High School. At 19, she returned to the United States to study at Macalester College in Saint Paul, Minnesota, graduating with a Bachelor of Arts in psychology. After that, Gurira earned a Master of Fine Arts in acting from New York University's Tisch School of the Arts.

== Career ==
=== Early career ===
Gurira taught playwriting and acting in Liberia, Zimbabwe and South Africa. One of her earliest notable performances occurred in 2001, as a senior at Macalester College. Gurira performed in a production of the Ntozake Shange play For Colored Girls Who Have Considered Suicide / When the Rainbow Is Enuf, directed and choreographed by Dale Ricardo Shields. "She was a very intelligent, strong and independent young lady," said Shields. "She approached her studies, her classes, with a lot of focus, and you can see the same things in her performance in Black Panther."

=== Theater and playwriting ===
Gurira said that she began writing plays in an effort to better utilize her strengths as an actress, and to tell stories that convey ideas about strong women with whom she identifies.

"Born into this world as an African girl, I never understood the absence of voices and people who were similar to me, it never made sense to me that I couldn't see that representation. The very massive magnitude of content you get in television and film, and yet there was this almost absolute absence of the stories of women from the continent and of the continent. [...] I didn't accept any ideas as to why it wasn't there. It just needed to be there. It just has to happen, and I guess I'll have to do it."

As a playwright, she has been commissioned by Yale Repertory Theatre, Center Theatre Group, Playwrights Horizons, and the Royal Court.

Gurira co-wrote and co-starred in In the Continuum, first at Woolly Mammoth Theatre Company and later Off-Broadway, which won her an Obie Award, an Outer Critics Circle Award, and a Helen Hayes Award for Best Lead Actress. In December 2011, In the Continuum commemorated World AIDS Day 2011. Sponsored by the United States Embassy in Zimbabwe, the play was performed at Harare's Theatre and featured the story of two women who were navigating the world after contracting HIV.

In 2009, Gurira made her Broadway acting debut in August Wilson's play Joe Turner's Come and Gone playing Martha Pentecost.

Gurira's 2012 play The Convert premiered as a co-production between the Goodman Theatre in Chicago and the McCarter Theatre in New Jersey. Later that year, Gurira received the Whiting Award for an emerging playwright and a Los Angeles Drama Critics Circle Award for Best Writing in 2013. The play is a historical drama set in 1890s Rhodesia (now Zimbabwe) about a woman who turns to the Catholic Church to escape an arranged marriage.

In January 2015, Familiar, a play written by Gurira and directed by Rebecca Taichman, opened at Yale Repertory Theatre. It later premiered Off-Broadway in New York at Playwrights Horizons. The play is about family, cultural identity, and the experience of life as a first-generation American. Gurira has said that it was inspired in part by her family and friends.

In May 2023, Gurira played Richard III in a Shakespeare in the Park production for which she received a nomination for Best Lead Actress in a Play for the 2022 Audelco Awards.

In July 2026, it was announced that Gurira will be part of the producing team for the play Shifters, premiering Off-Broadway.

==== Eclipsed ====
In 2015, Lupita Nyong'o starred in Gurira's play, Eclipsed (2009), Off-Broadway at The Public Theater. It was announced that the play would move to Broadway in 2016 at the John Golden Theatre. It was the first play to premiere on Broadway with an all female, black cast and creative team. The play is set in war-torn Liberia and focuses on three women who are living as sex slaves to a rebel commander, as well as one of his former wives, and a relief worker, and follows and how they deal with this difficult situation. It starred Lupita Nyong'o, Akosua Busia, Saycon Sengbloh, Zainab Jah, and Pascale Armand and was directed by Liesl Tommy. The inspiration for Gurira's play was a photo of Colonel Black Diamond, a female freedom fighter from Liberia, in an article in The New York Times. "Just to see these women standing there, you know, in their jeans and ... fashionable tops and their hair is all done, and they're all carrying AK-47s, was just an image I couldn't get out of my head." The image prompted curiosity about Liberia's fourteen-year civil wars, as well as a research trip to Liberia in 2007. Gurira interviewed more than 30 women who had been raped, among whose daughters that had been taken by rebel fighters and turned into sex slaves. She also spoke to female peace activists who were instrumental in ending the violence. The names of the women in Eclipsed come from the people Gurira met during her travels, whereas the fifth character is unnamed.

She received the 2016 Sam Norkin Award, for Eclipsed and Familiar, presented by the Drama Desk Awards, which said, in part: "Danai Gurira demonstrates great insight, range and depth, bringing a fresh new voice to American theater." Eclipsed received six nominations for the Tony Awards, including the Tony Award for Best Play, and won the Tony Award for Best Costume Design in a Play. Gurira also received a Helen Hayes Award, and an NAACP Theatre Award, and was nominated for a New York Drama Critics' Circle Award.

Her plays Eclipsed and Familiar received a score of 88 on Show Score which indicate "Excellent" on the platform, For Eclipsed from 570 reviews and Familiar with 119 reviews.

=== Film and television ===
Gurira starred in the drama film The Visitor in 2007, for which she won Method Fest Independent Film Festival Award for Best Supporting Actress. She appeared in the 2008 film Ghost Town, the 2010 films 3 Backyards and My Soul to Take, and Restless City in 2011, as well as the television series Law & Order: Criminal Intent, Life on Mars, and Law & Order. From 2010 to 2011, she appeared in the HBO drama series Treme.

In 2013, Gurira played a lead role in director Andrew Dosunmu's independent drama film Mother of George, which premiered at 2013 Sundance Film Festival. Gurira received critical acclaim for her performance as a Nigerian woman struggling to live in the United States. In June 2013, Gurira won the Jean-Claude Gahd Dam award at the 2013 Guys Choice Awards. The film was featured in Indiewire's 100 Best Movies of the Decade list and she was called a "stand out" in the film.

Gurira played rapper Tupac Shakur's mother, Afeni Shakur, in All Eyez on Me, a 2017 biopic about the rap star. Her performance gathered praise with IndieWire saying "Danai Gurira- as Tupac's beloved mother Afeni comes out swinging during the film's opening sequence and never lets up, believably burning right through the screen, conjuring the kind of passion the rest of the film lacks. If anyone makes off with a movie star turn in "All Eyez on Me," it's Walking Dead" star Gurira."The Hollywood Reporter says "Gurira gives great fiery intensity" and Variety in their review said "Afeni Shakur is played by Danai Gurira(who would have been perfect as Nina Simone), Gurira makes her a ruthlessly intelligent analyst of the white power structure who is nevertheless consumed by a rage that has no outlet." For this movie she received a NAACP Image awards nomination for Outstanding Actress in a Motion Picture.

She owns a production company called Gurazoo Productions. In 2020, Gurira signed a deal with ABC Studios.

Before the 2020 pandemic, a limited series adaptation of Chimamanda Ngozi Adichie's novel Americanah was being produced for HBO MAX with Danai writing the pilot and serving as showrunner and Lupita Nyong'o as the lead actress. However, production delays caused by the COVID-19 pandemic forced Nyong'o to drop out of the series over scheduling conflicts, which ultimately led to HBO Max's decision to drop the project.

In 2025, it was announced that Gurira had been cast in three upcoming films. Matchbox, a Mattel Films live-action movie based on the toy brand of the same name, released in 2026. The Take, opposite Denzel Washington and Robert Pattinson, directed by Fernando Meirelles and scheduled to be released on Netflix in January 2027. And a new remake of The Thomas Crown Affair, directed by Michael B. Jordan and slated for release in 2027.

==== The Walking Dead ====
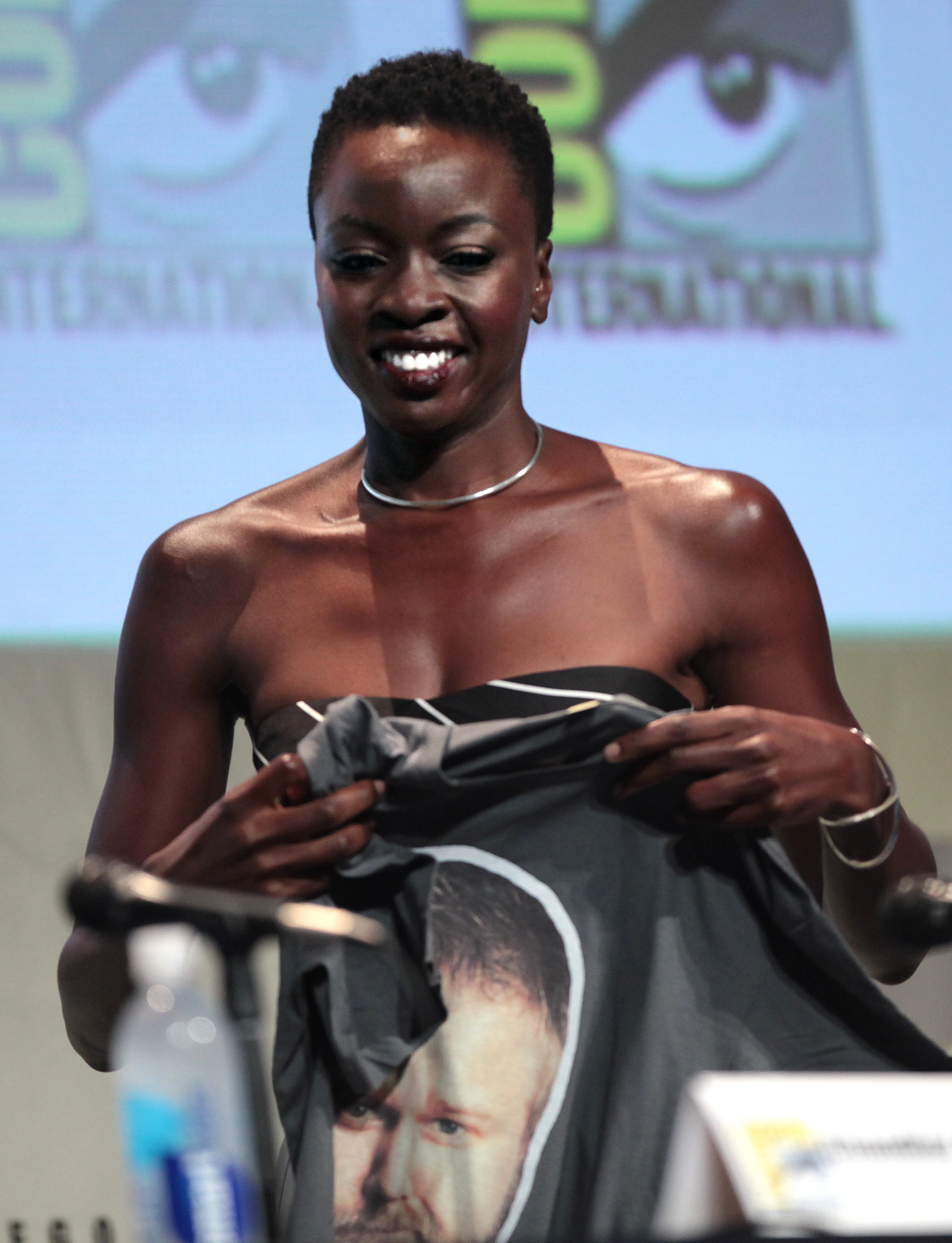
Gurira at the 2015 The Walking Dead Panel at San Diego Comic-Con.

In March 2012, AMC announced on a live broadcast that Gurira would join the cast of their horror-drama series The Walking Dead, the highest rated series in cable television history, in its third season. Gurira plays the iconic character Michonne, a relentless and strong katana-wielding woman with a mysterious past and steely resolve, who becomes part of the close-knit group in a zombie apocalypse world and gradually reveals deeply compassionate and intelligent traits. Gurira had to learn how to ride horses for the series, which she enjoyed because it was a physical challenge. Rolling Stone ranked Michonne first in their list of the 30 Best The Walking Dead Characters, describing Gurira's performance as extraordinary. In March 2025, Ranker ranked Michonne 9th in the top 10 list of Greatest Female TV characters of all time.

In February 2019, reports emerged that Gurira would be exiting the show once she had filmed her last episodes during the tenth season. Gurira's final episode, "What We Become" aired in March 2020. By the time of her departure, she was second-billed in the opening credits and had appeared in 96 episodes of the show.

In July 2022, it was announced by Scott M. Gimple, Andrew Lincoln and Danai Gurira at San Diego Comic-Con a spin-off mini-series centered around the couple Michonne and Rick Grimes, with Lincoln and Gurira reprising their roles from the original television series. The limited series, titled The Walking Dead: The Ones Who Live, premiered in February 2024 and consisted of six episodes. She co-created it, produced it and wrote the fourth episode, titled "What We". That episode received positive reviews from critics and got her a nomination for the 2024 Black Reel Television award for Outstanding Writing in a Drama Series. The episode was also submitted for the 2024 Emmys and was listed on Variety's Emmy Prediction Top 15 list at number 10 in the writing category. The series was well received by both critics and audiences, "Danai Gurira and Andrew Lincoln's phenomenal performances feel like The Walking Dead at its best."

==== Marvel Cinematic Universe ====
Danai was cast to star in Marvel's film Black Panther, which was released in February 2018. She played the loyal and highly skilled General Okoye, the head of the Dora Milaje; an elite all-female special forces unit protectors of Wakanda and its king, the Black Panther. She received critical acclaim for her performance, a SAG Award for Outstanding Performance by a Cast in a Motion Picture, a People's Choice Awards for The Action Movie Star of 2018, a Saturn Award for Best Supporting Actress and an NAACP Image award for Outstanding Supporting Actress in a Motion Picture. She also got a nomination for the Indiana Film Journalists Association for Best Supporting Actress. She got a nomination for Favorite Butt Kicker at the Nickelodeon Kids Choice Awards and a nomination for Choice Movie Actress: Sci-Fi at the Teen Choice Awards.

Gurira reprised the role of Okoye in the movies Avengers: Infinity War (2018), Avengers: Endgame (2019) and in the sequel Black Panther: Wakanda Forever (2022). She was set to star in a spinoff series on Disney+, but plans for the show were ultimately scrapped.

== Activism and philanthropy ==
Gurira is an advocate for women, the end of poverty, and for HIV/AIDS awareness.

In 2008, Gurira appeared at the Global Green Sustainable Design Awards to read a letter written by a New Orleans native displaced by Hurricane Katrina.

In 2011, Gurira co-founded Almasi Arts, an organization dedicated to continuing arts education in Zimbabwe. Gurira currently serves as the Executive Artistic Director.

In 2015, Gurira signed an open letter begun by the ONE Campaign. The letter was addressed to Angela Merkel and Nkosazana Dlamini-Zuma, urging them to focus on women as they serve as the head of the G7 in Germany and the AU in South Africa respectively.

In 2016, Gurira founded the non-profit organization Love Our Girls, which aims to highlight the issues and challenges that specifically affect women throughout the world. In the same year, Gurira partnered with Johnson & Johnson in the fight against HIV/AIDS. She campaigned for Hillary Clinton during the 2016 presidential election.

Gurira has been a Global Citizen ambassador since 2016, partnering with the organization on several campaigns and Global Citizen Festivals, including hosting the event in Ghana in 2022.

On December 2, 2018, Gurira was announced as a UN Women Goodwill Ambassador by UN Women Executive Director Phumzile Mlambo-Ngcuka at the Global Citizen Festival in Johannesburg, South Africa. As a UN Women Goodwill Ambassador, Gurira dedicates her support to putting a spotlight on gender equality and women's rights, as well as bringing unheard women's voices front and center. Also in 2018, Gurira teamed up with the international conservation organization WildAid in the campaign "Poaching Steals From Us All", focused on raising awareness of the threat poaching poses to animals such as the rhinoceros and elephants.

In 2023, Gurira teamed up with Peta with her dog Papi in a campaign against leaving dogs in hot cars.

Gurira campaigned for Kamala Harris during the 2024 presidential election.

== Personal life ==
Gurira is a Christian and lives in Los Angeles, though she regularly spends time in New York City and owns an apartment there.

== Filmography ==
=== Film ===
Year	Title	Role	Notes
2007	The Visitor	Zainab	
2008	My Soul to Take	Jeanne-Baptiste	
2008	Ghost Town	Assorted ghost	
2010	3 Backyards	Woman in Blue Dress	
2011	Restless City	Sisi	
2013	Mother of George	Adenike Olumide Balogun	
2015	Tinker Bell and the Legend of the NeverBeast	Fury (voice)	US Version only
2017	All Eyez on Me	Afeni Shakur	
2018	Black Panther	Okoye	
2018	Avengers: Infinity War	Okoye	
2019	Avengers: Endgame	Okoye	
2022	Black Panther: Wakanda Forever	Okoye	
2026	Matchbox: The Movie	Helen	
2027	The Take †	TBA	Post-production
2027	The Thomas Crown Affair †	TBA	Post-production

=== Television ===
Year	Title	Role	Notes
2004	Law & Order: Criminal Intent	Marei Rosa Rumbidzai	Episode: "Inert Dwarf"
2009	Life on Mars	Angela	Episode: "The Simple Secret of the Note in Us All"
2009	Law & Order	Courtney Owens	Episode: "Fed"
2010	American Experience	Sarah Steward	Episode: "Dolley Madison"
2010	Lie to Me	Michelle Russo	Episode: "Exposed"
2010–2011	Treme	Jill	6 episodes
2012–2020, 2022	The Walking Dead	Michonne	Main cast (seasons 3–10), guest (season 11); 96 episodes
2017	Robot Chicken	Michonne (voice)	Episode: "The Robot Chicken Walking Dead Special: Look Who's Walking"
2018	PBS' Breaking Big	Herself	Season 1, episode 3
2021	What If...?	Okoye (voice)	3 episodes
2023	Great Performances	Richard III	Season 50, Episode 14: Richard III filmed live for Shakespeare in the Park
2024	The Walking Dead: The Return	Herself	TV special
2024	The Walking Dead: The Ones Who Live	Michonne Grimes	Lead role; also executive producer, co-creator and writer
2026	Invincible	Universa (voice)	Episode: "Making the World a Better Place"

=== Theatre ===
Year	Title	Role	Notes	Venue	Ref.
2005	In the Continuum	Abigail, et al.	Playwright (co-written with Nikkole Salter)	Primary Stages, Off-Broadway	
2009	Joe Turner's Come and Gone	Martha Pentecost	Broadway acting debut	Belasco Theatre, Broadway	
2011	Measure for Measure	Isabella	Shakespeare in the Park	Delacorte Theater	
2012	The Convert	—N/a	Playwright	The Young Vic, London	
2015	Familiar	—N/a	Playwright	Playwright's Horizons, Off-Broadway	
2015	Eclipsed	—N/a	Playwright	The Public Theater, Off-Broadway	
2016	Eclipsed	—N/a	Playwright	John Golden Theatre, Broadway	
2022	Richard III	Richard III	Shakespeare in the Park	Delacorte Theater	

=== Video games ===
Year	Title	Role	Notes
2020	Fortnite Battle Royale	Michonne	Likeness
2023	Call of Duty: Modern Warfare III	Michonne	Playable character; voice and likeness
2025	Dead by Daylight	Michonne	Playable character; likeness
2026	World War Z	Michonne	Playable character; likeness

== Works or publications ==
- Gurira, Danai. Running Head: The Neglect of Black Women in Psychology. 2001. Honors paper, Macalester College
- Gurira, Danai, and Nikkole Salter. In the continuum. New York, NY: Samuel French, 2008. ISBN 978-0-573-65089-5
- Gurira, Danai. Eclipsed. New York: Dramatists Play Service, 2010. ISBN 978-0-822-22446-4
- Gurira, Danai. The Convert. Washington, DC : Woolly Mammoth Theatre Company, 2013.
- Gurira, Danai. Familiar. New York Public Library for the Performing Arts Billy Rose Theatre Division, 2016.
- Gurira, Danai. Power of women : Lupita Nyong'o. New York: DKC / O&M, 2016.

== Awards and nominations ==
Year	Award	Category	Work	Result	Ref
2006	Obie Award	Special Citation	In the Continuum	Won	
2006	Outer Critics Circle Awards	Outstanding Off-Broadway Play	In the Continuum	Nominated	
2006	Outer Critics Circle Awards	John Gassner Memorial Playwriting Award	In the Continuum	Won	
2007	Helen Hayes Awards	Best Lead Actress, Non-Resident	In the Continuum	Won	
2008	Gotham Award	Best Ensemble Cast	The Visitor	Nominated	
2008	Boston Society of Film Critics Award	Best Cast	The Visitor	Nominated	
2008	Method Fest	Best Supporting Actress	The Visitor	Won	
2010	Helen Hayes Award	The Charles MacArthur Award for Outstanding New Play or Musical	Eclipsed	Won	
2010	NAACP Theatre Awards	Best Playwright	Eclipsed	Won	
2011	The Women Film Critics Circle Awards	The Invisible Woman Award	3 Backyards	Nominated	
2012	Satellite Award	Best Cast – Television Series	The Walking Dead	Won	
2012	Whiting Awards	Writing in Drama	The Convert	Won	
2013	Los Angeles Drama Critics Circle Award	Best Writing	The Convert	Won	
2013	Eyegore Awards	Best Ensemble Cast Award	The Walking Dead	Won	
2013	The Women Film Critics Circle Awards	Best Actress	Mother of George	Nominated	
2014	Chlotrudis Awards	Best Actress	Mother of George	Nominated	
2014	Black Reel Award	Best Actress	Mother of George	Won	
2014	Black Reel Award	Best Breakthrough Performance	Mother of George	Nominated	
2014	American Black Film Festival Hollywood Awards	Best Actress	Mother of George	Nominated	
2016	NAACP Image Award	Outstanding Supporting Actress in a Drama Series	The Walking Dead	Nominated	
2016	Saturn Award	Best Supporting Actress on Television	The Walking Dead	Won	
2016	Tony Award	Best Play	Eclipsed	Nominated	
2016	Lilly Awards	Outstanding Playwriting	Eclipsed	Won	
2016	Drama Desk Award	Sam Norkin Award	Eclipsed	Won	
2016	New York Drama Critics' Circle Award	Best Play	Eclipsed	Nominated	
2016	Lucille Lortel Awards	Outstanding Play	Eclipsed	Nominated	
2016	TCG Gala	Honoree	Eclipsed	Won	
2016	ImageNation Revolution Awards	Revolution Award for Artistic Excellence	Eclipsed	Won	
2016	Outer Critics Circle Awards	Outstanding New Broadway Play	Eclipsed	Nominated	
2016	Outer Critics Circle Awards	Outstanding New Off-Broadway Play	Familiar	Nominated	
2016	Black Girls Rock! Award	Star Power Celebrant	Herself	Won	
2017	The Offies	Best New Play	The Convert	Nominated	
2017	Saturn Awards	Best Supporting Actress on a Television Series	The Walking Dead	Nominated	
2018	Saturn Awards	Best Supporting Actress	Black Panther	Won	
2018	Saturn Awards	Best Supporting Actress on a Television Series	The Walking Dead	Nominated	
2018	Essence Black Women in Hollywood Award	Honoree	Herself	Won	
2018	NAACP Image Awards	Outstanding Actress in a Motion Picture	All Eyez on Me	Nominated	
2018	MTV Movie Awards	Best On-Screen Team	Black Panther	Nominated	
2018	MTV Movie Awards	Best Fight	Avengers: Infinity War	Nominated	
2018	Astra Midseason Movie Award	Best Actress	Black Panther	Nominated	
2018	Indiana Film Journalists Association	Best Supporting Actress	Black Panther	Nominated	
2018	People's Choice Awards	The Action Movie Star of 2018	Black Panther	Won	
2018	The BAM Awards	Best Cast (Note: Shared with Chadwick Boseman, Michael B. Jordan, Lupita Nyong’o, Martin Freeman, Daniel Kaluuya, Letitia Wright, Sterling K. Brown, Angela Bassett, Forest Whitaker, Andy Serkis, Florence Kasumba, John Kani, David S. Lee, Nabiyah Be, et al.)	Black Panther	Won	
2019	Black Reel Award	Outstanding Supporting Actress	Black Panther	Nominated	
2019	Screen Actors Guild Awards	Outstanding Performance by a Cast in a Motion Picture (Note: Shared with Chadwick Boseman, Michael B. Jordan, Lupita Nyong’o, Martin Freeman, Daniel Kaluuya, Letitia Wright, Sterling K. Brown, Angela Bassett, Forest Whitaker, Andy Serkis and Winston Duke.)	Black Panther	Won	
2019	NAACP Image Awards	Outstanding Supporting Actress in a Motion Picture	Black Panther	Won	
2019	Saturn Awards	Best Supporting Actress on a Television Series	The Walking Dead	Won	
2019	People's Choice Awards	The Female TV Star of 2019	The Walking Dead	Nominated	
2020	People's Choice Awards	The Female TV Star of 2020	The Walking Dead	Nominated	
2020	People's Choice Awards	The Drama TV Star of 2020	The Walking Dead	Nominated	
2023	NAACP Image Award	Outstanding Supporting Actress in a Motion Picture	Black Panther: Wakanda Forever	Nominated	
2023	AUDELCO Recognition Awards	Lead Actress In a Play	Richard III	Nominated	
2024	Black Reel Awards	Outstanding Writing in a Drama Series	The Walking Dead: The Ones Who Live	Nominated	
2025	Saturn Awards	Best Actress in a Television Series	The Walking Dead: The Ones Who Live	Nominated	
2025	Saturn Awards	Best Television Presentation	The Walking Dead: The Ones Who Live	Won	
2025	Critics' Choice Super Awards	Best Actress In A Superhero Series, Limited Series Or Made-For-TV Movie	The Walking Dead: The Ones Who Live	Nominated	
