= Pete Chatmon =

American director

Pete Chatmon (born June 1, 1977 in New York City) is an American director.

== Early life ==
Chatmon was born in New York City. A graduate of New York University's Tisch School of the Arts.

== Career ==
Chatmon's work has been shown at over 25 film festivals around the world, including the Sundance Film Festival. His short films include: 3D, Chameleon, and Confessions of Cool.

He is best known for writing, producing, and directing the independent feature film Premium, starring Dorian Missick, Zoe Saldaña, Hill Harper, Eva Pigford, Frankie Faison, and William Sadler. Premium, nominated for a 2007 Best Independent Feature, Black Reel Award, has also earned the Honorary Mention Audience Award at the 2006 Urbanworld Film Festival as well as a New Visions, Special Jury Prize at the 2006 Bahamas International Film Festival.

Chatmon's next film is a documentary on the 761st Tank Battalion, narrated by Andre Braugher. He is developing several feature-length screenplays including What About Us?, The 4th, and an untitled hip-hop tribute.

== Personal life ==
In May 2019, Chatmon married Grey's Anatomy actress Kelly McCreary.

== Filmography ==
Short film

- 3D (2000)
- Chameleon (2004)
- Black Card (2015)
- Lady Bouncer (2017)

Feature film

- Premium (2006)

Documentary film

- 761st (2007)

TV series

Year	Title	Notes
2017	American Koko	12 episodes
2017	Insecure: Due North	Episode: "201"
2018–2019	Grown-ish	6 episodes
2018–2021	Black-ish	6 episodes
2018	Insecure	Episode: "Familiar-Like"
2018	Atypical	Episode: "Living at An Angle"
2018	Greenleaf	Episode: "She Changes Everything"
2019–2022	Grey's Anatomy	4 episodes
2019	Single Parents	Episode: "All Aboard The Two-Parent Struggle Bus"
2019	The Last O.G.	2 episodes
2019–2021	It's Always Sunny in Philadelphia	6 episodes
2020	A Million Little Things	Episode: "Guilty"
2020–2021	Mythic Quest: Raven's Banquet	3 episodes
2020	Mixed-ish	Episode: "Every Little Step"
2020	Station 19	Episode: "The Ghosts That Haunt Me"
2020–2021	All Rise	2 episodes
2021	Blindspotting	Episode: "Ghost Dad"
2021	The Unicorn	Episode: "Out with The Old"
2021–2025	You	3 episodes
2022	Long Slow Exhale	2 episodes
2022	The Flight Attendant	Episode: "Drowning Women"
2022–2025	Reasonable Doubt	5 episodes
2023	Unprisoned	Episode: "It's About Who You Want to Be"
2023	American Auto	Episode: "Funeral"
2023	Fatal Attraction	Episode: "Best Friends"
2023	Minx	Episode: "This Is Our Zig"
2024–2025	Ghosts	6 episodes
2024	Dead Boy Detectives	Episode: "The Case of the Hungry Snake"
2024–2025	High Potential	2 episodes
2024	NCIS: Origins	Episode: "Incognito"
2024	Interior Chinatown	Episode: "Detective"
2025	Chicago Fire	Episode: "Too Close"
2025	Yellowjackets	Episode: "Thanksgiving (Canada)"
2025	Grosse Pointe Garden Society	Episode: "The Cup"
2026	Elle	2 episodes
2026	Power Book III: Raising Kanan	Episode: "Pawns & Hooks"
2026	Scrubs	Episode: "My Best Friend's Birthday"
2026	Eternally Yours	2 episodes

== Awards and nominations ==
Year	Title	Award/Nomination
2006	Premium	Bahamas International Film Festival — New Visions Award; Black Reel Award for Outstanding Independent Film
2015	Black Card	Nominated — Black Reel Award for Outstanding Independent Short Film
