= ARRAY =

Independent distribution company

ARRAY Now
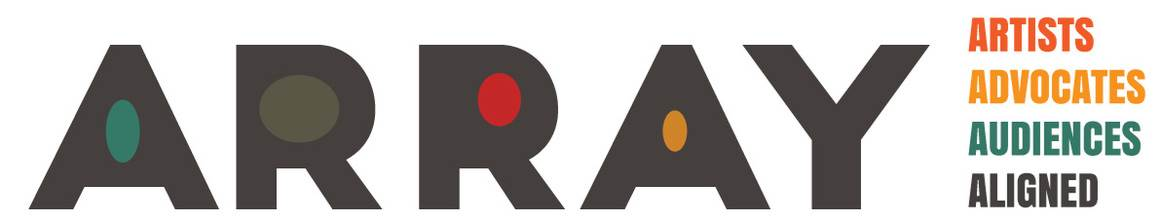
- Formerly: African-American Film Festival Releasing Movement (AFFRM)
- Industry: Film industry
- Founded: 2011
- Founder: Ava DuVernay
- Headquarters: Los Angeles, California
- Key people: Ava DuVernay
- Products: Film distribution
- Services: Film distribution Film marketing
- Website: arraynow.com

ARRAY is an independent distribution company launched by filmmaker and former publicist Ava DuVernay in 2011 under the name African-American Film Festival Releasing Movement (AFFRM). In 2015, the company rebranded as ARRAY.

In 2020 the Peabody Awards honored the company with the Institutional Honor for "amplifying film and TV projects by people of color and women filmmakers".

== History ==
DuVernay launched the company in 2010 after her debut feature film I Will Follow failed to acquire distribution. ARRAY has stated that its mission is to “produce, distribute and amplify work from Black artists, filmmakers of color and women of all kinds.”

In May 2015, DuVernay held a 12-hour Rebel-a-thon on Twitter to raise funds for the company. For 12 hours black directors like Ryan Coogler, John Singleton, Gina Prince-Bythewood, Tina Mabry, Julie Dash and more answered questions from the general public in order to raise awareness for ARRAY and encourage people to donate funds. Actors Thandiwe Newton, Kerry Washington and Jessica Chastain were among those who made substantial donations to the company.

In 2016 ARRAY signed a deal partnering with Netflix to distribute their films online. Since 2016 all ARRAY films have appeared exclusively on Netflix and stay on the platform for three years.

In 2019, the company created the Amanda cinema, named after founder Ava DuVernay's aunt, that was exclusively dedicated to showing films by people of color.

== Films distributed ==
Year	Title	Director	Notes	Ref
2011	I Will Follow	Ava DuVernay		
2011	Kinyarwanda	Alrick Brown	Winner of the World Cinema Audience Award at the Sundance Film Festival	
2012	Restless City	Andrew Dosunmu		
2012	Middle of Nowhere	Ava DuVernay	Winner of Best Director at the Sundance Film Festival	
2013	Better Mus' Come	Storm Saulter		
2013	Big Words	Neil Drumming		
2014	Vanishing Pearls: The Oystermen of Pointe à la Hache	Nailah Jefferson		
2015	Mississippi Damned	Tina Mabry	Premiered in 2009 but not distributed until 2015	
2015	Out of My Hand	Takeshi Fukunaga		
2015	Ayanda	Sara Blecher	Special Jury Prize in the World Fiction Competition at the LA Film Festival	
2016	Echo Park	Amanda Marsalis		
2016	Honeytrap	Rebecca Johnson		
2017	Namour	Heidi Saman		
2017	The House on Coco Road	Damani Baker		
2017	Teach Us All	Sonia Lowman		
2018	Jewel's Catch One	C. Fitz		
2018	Vaya	Akin Omotoso	Winner of Best Director and Best Screenplay at the Africa Movie Academy Awards	
2018	Roll With Me	Lisa France		
2019	The Burial of Kojo	Blitz Bazawule		
2019	Merata: How Mum Decolonised the Screen	Heperi Mita		
2019	Burning Cane	Phillip Youmans	Winner of Best U.S. Narrative Film, Best Cinematography and Best Actor at the Tribeca Film Festival	
2019	The Body Remembers When the World Broke Open	Elle-Máijá Tailfeathers and Kathleen Hepburn	Winner of Best Director, Best Original Screenplay and Best Cinematography at the Canadian Screen Awards	
2020	Jezebel	Numa Perrier	Winner of Best Feature and Best Director at the American Black Film Festival	
2020	They've Gotta Have Us	Simon Frederick		
2020	Justine	Stephanie Turner		
2020	Lingua Franca	Isabel Sandoval	Winner of Best Performance and Best Cinematography at the Young Critics Circle	
2020	Residue	Merawi Gerima	Winner of Best Narrative Feature, Audience Award and Acting Award at the Slamdance Film Festival	
2020	Ainu Mosir	Takeshi Fukunaga		
2020	Funny Boy	Deepa Mehta		
2020	Alaska is a Drag	Shaz Bennett		
2020	Definition Please	Sujata Day		
2021	In Our Mothers’ Gardens			
2021	Cousins			
2021	Sankofa			
2021	Love and Fury			
2022	Donkeyhead	Agam Darshi		
2022	Definition Please			
2022	Learn to Swim			
2022	What We Leave Behind	Iliana Sosa	Louis Black "Lone Star" and Fandor New Voices Awards at SXSW; Gotham Best Documentary nominee	
2023	Mars One	Gabriel Martins		
2023	Frybread Face and Me	Billy Luther		
