= I Called Him Morgan =

Documentary film released theatrically in 2017

- Directed by: Kasper Collin
- Written by: Kasper Collin
- Produced by: Kasper Collin
- Cinematography: Bradford Young, Erik Vallsten
- Edited by: Hanna Lejonqvist, Eva Hillström, Dino Jonsäter, Kasper Collin
- Music by: Lee Morgan and more
- Release dates: September 2016 (Venice); March 24, 2017 (US)
- Countries: Sweden; USA
- Language: English

I Called Him Morgan is a 2016 Swedish produced documentary film written and directed by Kasper Collin which offers an account of the life of jazz trumpeter Lee Morgan, and his relationship with his common-law wife Helen Morgan, who killed him in February 1972.

The documentary was produced over a period of seven years from 2009 to 2016, including three years of editing.

Among the participants in I Called Him Morgan are Wayne Shorter, Jymie Merritt, Billy Harper, Judith Johnson, Bennie Maupin, Larry Ridley, Paul West, Larry Reni Thomas, Al Harrison, Charli Persip and Albert "Tootie" Heath.

== Release ==
=== Festival ===
I Called Him Morgan premiered out of competition at the 73rd Venice International Film Festival after being pitched at the 2012 MeetMarket at Doc/Fest. After Venice, it went on to play Telluride Film Festival, Toronto International Film Festival, New York Film Festival and BFI London Film Festival. After Toronto Vox described the film as it "feels like an Oscar winner for best documentary feature just waiting to happen." The New Yorker dubbed the documentary, together with Moonlight and The Hedonists, as New York Film Festival's Breakout Films.

=== Theatrical ===
I Called Him Morgan had its US theatrical premiere on March 24, 2017. It premiered in Sweden on March 31, in Canada on April 7, and in the United Kingdom on July 28.

=== Home media ===
On July 24, 2017 the film premiered on Netflix worldwide (to whom it was sold during the 2016 Toronto International Film Festival), except in the UK and Sweden. The UK premiere was on August 8, 2017. I Called Him Morgan was for a long time one of the 15 best reviewed movies on Netflix according to Metacritic. After the releases of the acclaimed movies The Irishman and Marriage Story, I Called Him Morgan is the 18th best reviewed of all movies on Netflix.

== Reception ==
There are 20 reviews registered at Metacritic. Eight of them are registered as 100/100, and the film has a score of 90 out of 100. On July 1, 2017, Metacritic announced the film as the best reviewed movie of the first half of 2017. By the end of the year it ended up as the 7th best reviewed movie and the third best reviewed documentary of 2017 based on its Metacritic score

On Rotten Tomatoes, the film has a 96% score based on 52 reviews. The site's consensus states: "I Called Him Morgan doubles as a seductive tribute to its subject's jazz passion as well as an absorbing look at a fatally doomed relationship".

In his New York Times review A.O. Scott called the film "a delicate human drama about love, ambition and the glories of music".

In Los Angeles Times critic Kenneth Turan noted:

"Artistic, obsessive and intoxicating, I Called Him Morgan is a documentary with a creative soul, and that makes all the difference. /.../ Using a dazzling blend of cinematic tools, aural as well as visual, Collin recreates both individual lives and an entire world. As a slice of recovered and illuminated time, I Called Him Morgan has few peers. /.../ The film's centerpiece interview is an arresting one-of-a-kind narrative that Helen Morgan herself recorded on a cassette-tape recorder a month before she died. Speaking with writer and teacher Larry Reni Thomas, she details her difficult life, her relationship with Morgan and how and why she came to shoot him at a Manhattan jazz club named Slugs in the midst of a blizzard so terrible that it delayed ambulances, contributing to her husband's death. /.../ What makes "Morgan" such an exceptional film is that Collin, with a combination of good fortune and great skill, has built on this excellent verbal foundation with transfixing visuals that set a powerful mood. /.../ Regardless of whether you care deeply about jazz, the poetry of Collin's filmmaking and the poignancy of the couple's story will win you over. As a piece of history and a personal journey, I Called Him Morgan is cinema to cherish.

In his 5-star review in The Guardian film critic Jordan Hoffman wrote:

"Kasper Collin's I Called Him Morgan isn't just the greatest jazz documentary since Let's Get Lost, it's a documentary-as-jazz. Spellbinding, mercurial, hallucinatory, exuberant, tragic /.../ I Called Him Morgan is far from a traditional documentary. Its story-within-a-story begins with a 2013 interview with Larry Reni Thomas, a North Carolina teacher who just so happens to be a legendary jazz DJ. In the mid 1990s, as he was greeting new students in an adult education class, he realized his new pupil (nearing age 70) was Helen Morgan, Lee's widow. In 1996 Thomas sat down with an inexpensive tape recorder and asked her questions. A month later she died. Collin turns to that plain, unlabeled white tape, marred by squeaks and hisses, and from it emerges the ghost of a voice. /.../ Though Lee and Helen Morgan's fate is easily learned with a quick Google search, I'd rather leave it unspoken, out there in memory's snowdrift, something strange and indescribable, like this sad but still beautiful film itself."

Variety's film critic Guy Lodge says in his review that

"Few musical genres connote as specifically refined a visual aesthetic as jazz: Alongside those complex, clattering notes, a lot of immaculate lighting, styling and tailoring went into the birth of the cool. So it's fitting that Kasper Collin's excellent documentary I Called Him Morgan, a sleek, sorrowful elegy for the prodigiously gifted, tragically slain bop trumpeter Lee Morgan, is as much a visual and textural triumph as it is a gripping feat of reportage. /.../ Sometimes acidly candid, sometimes foggy, but consistently rueful, Helen Morgan's account of events serves as the film's narrative spine — featured alternately through digitally tidied audio and the muddy whistle of Thomas’ original cassette recordings, as if to demonstrate the ephemeral nature even of the facts in this unhappy slice of history. Collin and his adroit team of editors intercut her testimony with the present-day recollections of a host of Morgan's colleagues and contemporaries, from Wayne Shorter to Albert ‘Tootie’ Heath to Billy Harper. They're not always precisely aligned in their view of the man and his downfall: Morgan remains something of a slippery enigma to the end, to the point that even his wife and murderer sounds poignantly astonished in retrospect that they ever shared each other's lives. It's this misty sense of memory that Young (best known for his collaborations with Ava DuVernay) conjures through his imagery, at once sketchy and sumptuous in its portrayal of a New York City just sliding out of its apex of cool into grittier squalor: His street scenes, blotching light and shadow as if painting watercolor on newsprint, can look either as vivid or as faded as the history in question. Content may be king in non-fiction filmmaking, and Collin has assembled a great deal here. But it's the elegant melancholy of the film's visuals, in complete sympathy with the most wistful cuts of its subject's discography, that burnishes both the information we have and the gaps in it. "I couldn't have did this, this must be a dream," Helen Morgan says of her crime; by the end of this deeply sad, sensuous portrait, you almost think it was."

In the Wall Street Journal, film critic Joe Morgenstern wrote in his review that "Musicians sometimes paraphrase Debussy, or one another, in saying that music is the silence between the notes. I Called Him Morgan has it all—the notes and the silence, plus the music of spoken language, pitched in rueful tones of recollection."

And in the Village Voice critic Alan Scher Stuhl notes: "It's fitting that one of the great films about jazz centers on the re-creation of a moment. /.../ Collin and company are after climate, not weather. They steep us in our awareness that Morgan and his New York have been lost, that our glimpses of it must either be through memory or hazed-up photography — or the music itself."

In her PopMatters review critic Cynthia Fuchs describes how the documentary in its storytelling deals with memories and what is possible and not possible to know:

"Helen's interview and her husband's story form a dual foundation for I Called Him Morgan. Layering experiences and impressions, music and image, Kasper Collin's remarkable film is less concerned with history than with effects, influences that stretch across time, ideas that shape art. /.../ Some viewers may be familiar with Lee Morgan's career and celebrated talent, and others may not know how profoundly he shaped American jazz. For the former, the film's opening with Morgan's "Search for the New Land" will recall his 1964 album with Billy Higgins, Wayne Shorter, and Herbie Hancock, and for the latter, the sound may be a revelation, cool, smart, occasionally abstract. The track plays over a scene that appears abstract as well, snow falling against a gray sky, a seeming negative image that makes the snow look like ash. The snow looks forward and back, to the day when Helen shot Lee in a New York club calls Slug's, open that night in February 1972 despite a blizzard. "Search for the New Land" gives way to saxophonist Billy Harper's recollection: "I just couldn't believe it. I didn't know what to think, because they were always together." Harper's response to Morgan's death echoes many you'll hear in the film, from other associates like bass player Jymie Merritt or saxophonist Wayne Shorter, artists whose lives were touched by Morgan, and Helen too. "I heard police had arrested her and taken her to jail," says Bennie Maupin. "And, you know, I never saw her again." That sense of loss lingers throughout the film. Morgan and Helen first appear on screen as a photo, held in Harper's hand. Morgan's back is to the camera, and he's looking into a brick-walled kitchen, where Helen sits at a table, lighting a cigarette. This photo and others create a sort of visual backbone for the film, frozen moments of their life together. /.../ Such stills—alongside some black and footage of performances, with Art Blakey's Jazz Messengers and Morgan's own bands—offer glimpses of Morgan and Helen's stories, but only that. Collin's film fills in the gaps for which it has no visual records with carefully selected abstractions, the snow and the cows, city streets, blurred traffic lights, New York City bridges and building exteriors. Brief looks at fire escapes and windows suggest times long past but lingering, desires to look inside, to understand. As much as the interview subjects who knew Helen and Morgan tell their versions of what happened, none has details about how the relationship began or shifted. When bassist Paul West observes, "His life was restored by Helen and it was a joy to watch: he was playing, he was producing, and he was living," a few shots of Morgan illustrate: he's older, he's sober, he's working his PR. As these images help you to imagine what people describe, they also remind you of what you don't see. /.../ In exposing and making sense of the fragments and fault lines of memories, I Called Him Morgan tells the stories of Helen and Morgan—how they met, how they worked together, how they appeared to others. It also tells a story of storytelling, how different strands come together and fall apart, how listeners participate in that process. In this, the film conjures visual rhythms resembling jazz, montages of image and sound providing new ways of conceiving the movements of time, of cause and effect, of interpretation. As it articulates loss, the movie also contemplates understanding."

Critic Lauren Du Graf states in Museum Of The Moving Image's magazine Reverse Shot that:

"I Called Him Morgan casts Helen (the "I" in the film's title) not as a coldblooded killer, but as a sympathetic and relatable one. She rescued Lee Morgan from a rock-bottom heroin addiction, clothed him, fed him, housed him, and bought back his trumpet, which he had pawned for drug money. She found him work when no one wanted to hire him, and made sure he showed up to his gigs. She even carried his trumpet for him. By centering on Helen, the film has a feminist streak, a badly needed course corrective for a musical genre whose histories overwhelmingly stem from the perspective of men worshipping at the altar of other men. Like Nellie Monk, Lorraine Gillespie, Gladys Hampton, and Maxine Gordon, Helen Morgan labored in an invisible economy of jazz wives who worked behind the scenes to ensure their husbands’ success and survival. Helen's murder of Lee, the film implies, was a morally ambiguous crime of passion, a knee-jerk collection on a vast and unrepayable debt. /.../ The film's portrayal of Helen is also intersectional, showing how her life was shaped by her efforts to escape poverty, motherhood, and the limited opportunities afforded black women of her generation. The film plumbs the unseen corners of Helen's life, taking viewers into the rural North Carolina hamlet where she was raised. She gave birth twice before the age of 14. An ambivalent mother, Helen left her children behind in the South to pursue a life in New York City. She rejected the service jobs typically offered to black women, and cultivated a community of bohemians at her apartment, which served as an after-hours spot for struggling musicians to crash or eat a home-cooked meal."

Also the writer Adam Shatz in an article in The Paris Review talks about I Called Him Morgan as unique for its female perspective:

"There is nothing mysterious about the death of Lee Morgan, unlike Albert Ayler's: Helen was in a crowd of onlookers when she killed him. But I Called Him Morgan illuminates a deeper, in some ways more intriguing mystery: the jazz life of the hard-bop era, which saw a confluence with civil rights and Black Power. What interests Collin is not so much recording or performance as the intimacy among musicians and their friends. This is a world we know mostly from the work of photographers like Roy DeCarava, Lee Friedlander, and W. Eugene Smith, who spent time with jazz musicians when they weren't performing, and captured their intimate lives off-stage. Collin's cameraman, the gifted cinematographer Bradford Young (Selma, Mother of George, A Most Violent Year), has clearly studied their work. Snow falling and city lights in New York; seagulls, trees, and sunset in North Carolina: Young shoots these recurring images in elusive, grainy textures that give the film a moody atmosphere reminiscent of the French New Wave, a movement intoxicated by the sounds of sixties jazz. What Collin is after, I think, is something just as elusive as Young's imagery: the relationship between creation and (self-) destruction. It's well known that the world of jazz musicians was bedeviled by poverty, drugs, racism, police violence, and—a cure that could end up feeling like a curse—self-imposed exile. What held that world together and made artistic innovation possible is less well understood. As I Called Him Morgan reminds us, friendship was one of its pillars: we hear musicians remembering their times with Lee, and what they remember isn't only music, but eating, buying clothes, and racing cars at midnight in Central Park. They were hardly unscathed by competition, but this was partly offset by a common artistic purpose, and by the hopes inspired by the civil rights struggle, which Morgan evoked in his epic 1964 composition "Search for the New Land"—a piece that provides Collin with his leitmotif. Jazz musicians were trying to create not only a new music, but another country, to borrow the title of James Baldwin's 1962 novel, which turns on the suicide of a jazz drummer named Rufus Scott. They could not have done so—they could scarcely have survived—without fellow travelers in bohemia who shared their vision and kept them going in the most inauspicious conditions. /.../ But the most crucial members of the scene, besides the musicians, may have been the women, most of whom have been lost to history. /.../ Helen Morgan was one of these women. /.../ One of the great strengths of Collin's film is that it honors her work and struggle as a black woman from the South: I Called Him Morgan is as much about Helen Morgan as it is about Lee. What could have been a judgmental film about a scorned woman who kills her lover in a jealous rage is, instead, a sorrowful, almost redemptive study of contrition and forgiveness. We hear Helen's voice throughout the film in a slightly hissing tape made by Larry Reni Thomas, an adult educator in Wilmington, North Carolina, who taught her after she was released from prison. Thomas recorded the interview in February 1996; Helen died a month later. Warbling and grainy, coquettish yet strong, somewhat reminiscent of Billie Holiday, her voice carries us through the film, along with Morgan's "Search for the New Land." She, too, was looking for another country when she left the Jim Crow South for New York, in her late teens, just as Charlie Parker and Dizzy Gillespie were launching the bebop revolution at uptown clubs like Minton's, and on "The Street"—West Fifty-Second Street."

== Awards ==
I Called Him Morgan was included in "The Best Movies of 2017" in New York Times, New Yorker, Time, Esquire, Village Voice, Little White Lies, FLM and more.

Esquire magazine's list of the best documentaries of 2017 placed I Called Him Morgan at the top. The film was also included in a midyear best-of list in the Los Angeles Times and Esquire, and in similar midyear summaries in The Playlist, Thrillist and Paste Magazine, as well as several lists of best documentaries of 2017.

The film was nominated as Outstanding Documentary Film in the 2018 NAACP Image Awards, as Best Documentary in the 2018 Empire Awards and as Best Music Documentary in the 2017 Critics Choice Documentary Awards. It was awarded as the 6th best documentary in 2017 Indiewire Critic's Poll and shortlisted as Best Cinema Documentary in the 2018 Grierson Awards.

It has been said that I Called Him Morgan is the best reviewed Swedish produced film in the US since Fanny and Alexander. Nonetheless it didn't receive any nominations in the Swedish 2018 Guldbaggen Awards, which caused several Swedish film writers to wonder what happened. Among them was Jon Asp who wrote in the Swedish magazine Point of View: "The big robbery of the year – the entire film world would probably call it difficult provincialism – is that Kasper Collin's I Called Him Morgan is not nominated for this year's top three documentaries (or any other category)." The Norwegian filmcritic Kjetil Lismoen wrote: "Most people know that juries who pick out nominees for awards are fallible. But in this case, it borders on pure incompetence, or hurtful will. Maybe some of my Swedish film friends can tell me to what extent this is a work accident?"

== Others ==
I Called Him Morgan is director Kasper Collin's second feature documentary. The first was My Name Is Albert Ayler .
