= Jewel's Catch One =

Gay dance bar in Los Angeles

Coordinates: 34.047816°N 118.324105°W

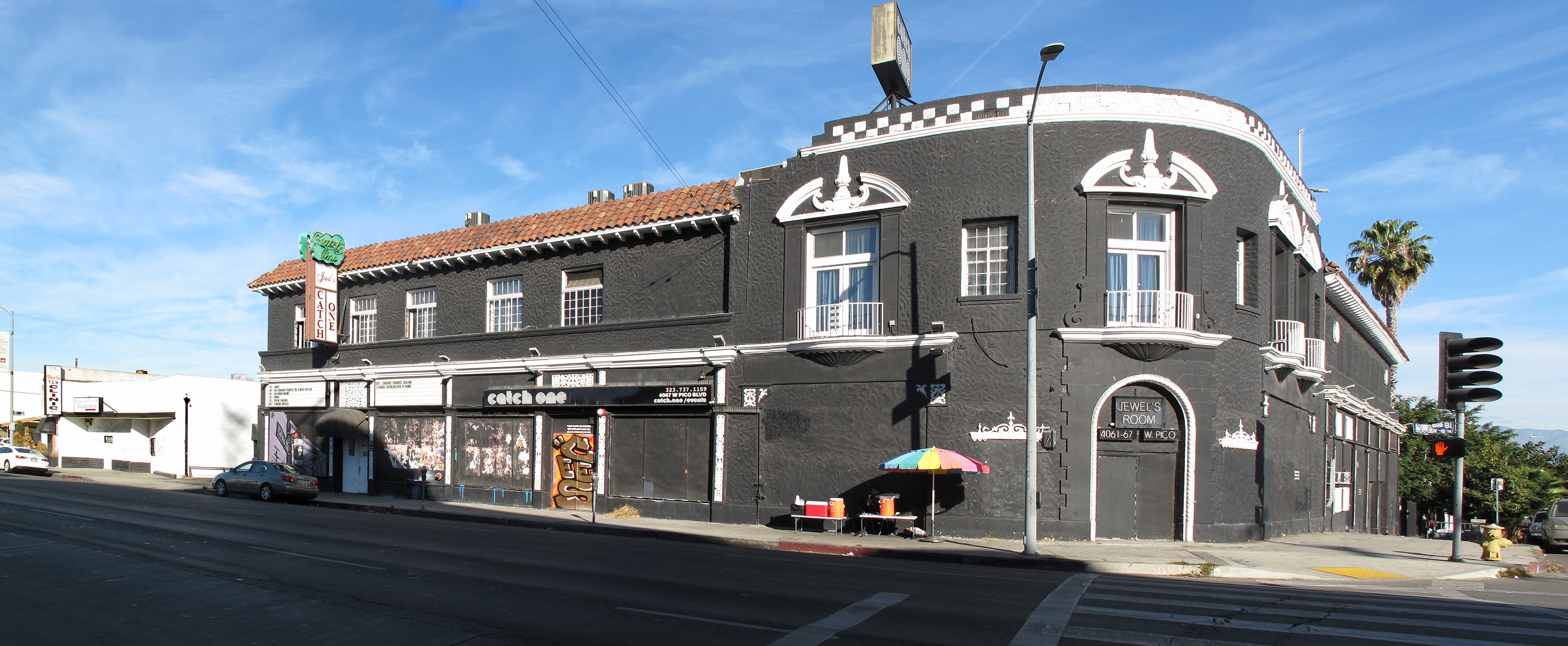
- Catch One, 2020

- Location within Los Angeles
- Address: 4067 West Pico Boulevard; Arlington Heights; Los Angeles, California
- Owner: Jewel Thais William

Construction
- Opened: 1973; 53 years ago
- Closed: 2015; 11 years ago

Jewel's Catch One was a dance bar owned by Jewel Thais-Williams. It was located at 4067 West Pico Boulevard in the Arlington Heights neighborhood of Los Angeles. Opened in 1973, it was the longest running black gay dance bar in Los Angeles. After nearly closing in 2015, it was purchased by Mitch Edelson and his father Steve Edelson - who reopened under new management. Briefly called Union after the change in management, it has since reverted to the Catch One moniker.

== History ==
Opened in 1973, Jewel's Catch One was one of the first black discos in the United States and was for a long time the major black gay bar in Los Angeles. The original owner of the club was Jewel Thais-Williams. She graduated from UCLA with a B.A. in History, and during her college years she wanted to be self-employed. Her first business was a boutique, but it went out of business, so she bought a bar. She opened the club after she experienced discrimination in different clubs around West Hollywood, because she was black and female. Women at the time were not allowed to tend bar, but Jewel saved enough money and bought the bar despite the limitations. When the club opened, it became a hub for a diverse population of performers, including Sylvester, Whitney Houston, Luther Vandross, Janet Jackson, Donna Summer, Whoopi Goldberg, Rick James, and Madonna. Also, it served as a space for political organizations to have their community meetings.

As the years went by, the attendance of the bar went down. When Jewel was about to shut the club down, it was bought by Steve Edelson and his son Mitch Edelson in November, 2015. After that, it became known as the last Black owned disco and was renamed The Union.

The club was featured as an organization in an exhibit in the City Hall in Los Angeles called "Defiant Spaces".

== In the media ==
=== Jewel And The Catch (1993) documentary ===
While patrons of Jewel's Catch One as undergraduate students at the University of Southern California in the mid-1980s, filmmaker, Cristina Kotz Cornejo and her life partner, African-American playwright and artist, Angela Counts befriended Jewel and were so taken by the club and her life story they asked permission to shoot what would be their first film about Jewel. By the early 1990s they had produced a short documentary titled, Jewel and the Catch. The film has since been selected to be part of the UCLA Film Archives' Outfest Legacy Project Collection. In 2013 Raven-Symoné selected an excerpt from Jewel and The Catch to screen at the 2013 Outfest Legacy Awards. In 2016, Producers of the Amazon series, Transparent selected footage from Jewel and the Catch to appear in the opening credit sequence of season 3 of Transparent by Joey Soloway.

=== Jewel's Catch One (2016) documentary ===
A documentary about the nightclub, Jewel's Catch One, directed by C. Fitz, started shooting in April 2010 and was finished in June 2016. The film premiered at Provincetown International Film Festival on June 19, 2016, followed by a Los Angeles Premiere at Outfest on July 10, 2016, a New York Premiere at UrbanWorld Film Festival on September 25, 2016, and a European Premiere at BFI London Film Festival October 9, 2016. The film celebrates the legacy of the nightclub, its community, and the life-changing impact its owner, Jewel Thais-Williams, had on her community breaking down racial and cultural barriers and building the oldest black-owned disco in America. Jewel’s Catch One covers four decades of Los Angeles history honoring the music, fashion, celebrities, and activism. Variety Magazine called the film “an undeniably loving documentary tribute by director C. Fitz to the club and its longtime owner Jewel.” In the film, through exclusive interviews and performances from Thelma Houston, Sharon Stone, Maxine Waters, Jenifer Lewis, Bonnie Pointer, Thea Austin, and Sandra Bernhard, plus rare archival footage of Madonna at the club, director C. Fitz documents how the club grew to be known as the unofficial Studio 54 of the west coast, except everyone was allowed in without judgement. The film culminates with Jewel and her Catch community becoming a national model of how to fight discrimination and serve the less fortunate. The film follows Jewel as she buys the building next door to Jewel's Catch One and builds a non-profit health clinic. The feature documentary was named one of the best LGBTQ films to watch on Netflix of all time by Logo TV’s NEWNOWNEXT in 2018. The film covers the Catch One family battling tirelessly against racism, homophobia, and hate for over forty-two years to keep the club doors open to everyone through its closing in 2015. It screened internationally on the film festival circuit in over fifty film festivals, including BFI, Palm Springs Film Festival (Best of Fest’ list January 10, 2017), UrbanWorld Film Festival, and Melbourne Documentary Film Festival.

In the spring of 2018, Ava DuVernay obtained the distribution rights from C. Fitz and Dancing Pictures LLC with her distribution company, ARRAY. Array released the Jewel's Catch One documentary on Netflix. It has won four awards for “Best Documentary” and a Top Jury Award. The film tells the history of one of the original safe spaces for the LGBTQ, Black, and AIDS impacted communities.

== See also ==
- List of LGBTQ bars
