= Where Is Kyra? =

- Theatrical release poster
- Directed by: Andrew Dosunmu
- Screenplay by: Darci Picoult
- Story by: Andrew Dosunmu; Darci Picoult
- Produced by: Christine Vachon; David Hinojosa; Rhea Scott
- Starring: Michelle Pfeiffer; Kiefer Sutherland
- Cinematography: Bradford Young
- Edited by: Oriana Soddu
- Music by: Philip Miller
- Production companies: Great Point Media; Killer Films; Little Minx; Big Indie Pictures
- Distributed by: Great Point Media; Paladin
- Release dates: January 23, 2017 (Sundance); April 6, 2018 (United States)
- Running time: 98 minutes
- Country: United States
- Language: English
- Box office: $59,717

Where Is Kyra? (released in the United Kingdom as Deceit) is a 2017 American drama film directed by Andrew Dosunmu with a screenplay by Darci Picoult and a story by Dosunmu and Picoult. The film stars Michelle Pfeiffer and Kiefer Sutherland.

The film had its world premiere at the Sundance Film Festival on January 23, 2017. It was released in a limited release on April 6, 2018, by Great Point Media and Paladin.

== Cast ==
- Michelle Pfeiffer as Kyra Johnson
- Kiefer Sutherland as Doug
- Suzanne Shepherd as Ruth Johnson
- Sam Robards as Carl
- Rutanya Alda as Ms. Pavlovsky

== Production ==
Killer Films' Christine Vachon produced the film along with David Hinojosa and Rhea Scott, while Great Point Media financed the film. Originally titled Beat-Up Little Seagull, later it was re-titled Where Is Kyra?.

Principal photography on the film began on November 2, 2015 in New York City, and it ended on January 2, 2016.

== Release ==
The film premiered at the 2017 Sundance Film Festival on January 23, 2017. In January 2018, it was announced Great Point Media and Paladin would distribute the film. It was released in a limited release on April 6, 2018. Where is Kyra was released in the UK in March 2019 digitally with a changed title of Deceit.

== Critical reception ==
On Rotten Tomatoes, the film has an approval rating of 81% based on 53 reviews and an average rating of 6.4/10. The website's critical consensus reads, "Where Is Kyra? rests on Michelle Pfeiffer's magnetically raw performance — and lives up to it with a trenchant, hard-hitting story." On Metacritic, the film has an average score of 72 out of 100, based on 20 critics, indicating "generally favorable reviews". Michelle Pfeiffer was nominated for a 2018 Gotham Award for Best Actress for her performance.
