= Big Words =

2013 American film

- Directed by: Neil Drumming
- Screenplay by: Neil Drumming
- Produced by: Matthew Keene Smith
- Starring: Dorian Missick; Gbenga Akinnagbe; Darien Sills-Evans; Zachary Booth; Yaya DaCosta; Jean Grae; Amir Arison
- Cinematography: Cliff Charles
- Edited by: Keith Overton
- Music by: Neil Drumming
- Production company: Twice Told Films
- Distributed by: Array
- Release date: January 2013 (Slamdance Film Festival)
- Running time: 93 minutes
- Country: United States
- Language: English

Big Words is the feature film debut of writer/director Neil Drumming and premiered at Slamdance Film Festival in January 2013. Drumming wrote and directed.

== Plot ==
Set on November 4, 2008, the night of Barack Obama's historic election as the first black President of the United States, Big Words revolves around three friends who 15 years earlier had had "a promising hip-hop group and are now dealing with the challenges of being in their late 30s."

== Distribution ==
The collective African-American Film Festival Releasing Movement (AFFRM) distributed the film. Big Words made its New York premiere at the Brooklyn Academy of Music.

== Reception ==
Selecting the film as a New York Times "Critics' Pick," Jeannette Catsoulis's review praised Drumming's "whip-smart screenplay" and "droll, insightful dialogue," describing the film as "an engrossing, coming-of-middle-age drama." Writing in The Independent, Darren Richman compared Drumming's filmmaking to Noah Baumbach, both in the directors' relationship to the characters their films depict—like Baumbach, "Drumming seems to love his characters because of rather than in spite of their flaws"—and in the films' subject matter, noting that a "sense that things haven’t quite gone to plan, reminiscent of Baumbach’s Greenberg, hangs over Big Words from first frame to last."

== Cast ==
- Dorian Missick as John Smith aka Big Words
- Gbenga Akinnagbe as James
- Darien Sills-Evans as Malik the Cut Mystik
- Zachary Booth as Ben Shine
- Yaya DaCosta as Annie
- Jean Grae as Bree
- Amir Arison as Eddie
- Francis Benhamou as Sam
- Suzy Jane Hunt as Traci
- J. Bernard Holloway as Bubby
- Ta-Nehisi Coates as himself
- Malcolm Xavier as Young P
