= Premium (film) =

- Theatrical release poster
- Directed by: Pete Chatmon
- Written by: Pete Chatmon
- Produced by: Pete Chatmon; Sriram Das; Kevin Scott Frakes; Lynn Appelle
- Starring: Dorian Missick; Zoe Saldana; Hill Harper; Eva Pigford; Frankie Faison; William Sadler
- Music by: Eric Lewis
- Distributed by: CodeBlack Entertainment
- Release date: March 6, 2006
- Running time: 97 minutes
- Language: English

Premium is a 2006 romantic comedy-drama film written and directed by Pete Chatmon, and starring Dorian Missick, Zoe Saldaña, and Hill Harper.

== Cast ==
- Dorian Missick as Cool
- Zoe Saldana as Charli
- Hill Harper as Ed
- Eva Pigford as Farrah
- Tonya Pinkins as Marva
- Sean Nelson as Austin Price
- Novella Nelson as Jayme
- Keith Nobbs as Derick
- Frankie Faison as Phil
- William Sadler as Cole Carter

== Accolades ==
- 2006 Miami International Film Festival, World Cinema Competition
- 2006 UrbanWorld Vibe Film Festival, Honorable Mention Audience Award
- 2006 Bahamas International Film Festival, New Visions Award, Special Jury Prize
- 2006 BMW Blackfilm.com Film Series (Los Angeles, Chicago, Washington DC, Atlanta)
- 2006 American Black Film Festival, Official Selection
- 2006 Pan African Film Festival, Closing Night Film, Atlanta, Georgia
- 2006 Newark Black Film Festival, Official Selection
- 2006 Black Harvest Film Festival, Official Selection
