= Familiar (play) =

Play by Danai Gurira

Familiar is a play written by Danai Gurira, commissioned by Yale Repertory Theatre.

== Productions ==
Familiar had its world premiere at Yale Repertory Theatre in New Haven, Connecticut on January 30, 2015. It ran through February 2015. The production was directed by Rebecca Taichman.

The play opened Off-Broadway at Playwright's Horizons as a limited engagement on February 10, 2016 in previews. After receiving critical success, the run was extended and Familiar ran until April 10, 2016. The production at Playwright's Horizons was also directed by Rebecca Taichman.

The play was performed in January–March 2019 at The Old Globe in San Diego, directed by Edward Torres.

== Synopsis ==
Familiar takes place in the winter of late 2011 at the home of Marvelous and Donald Chinyaramwira in a suburb of Minneapolis, Minnesota. The story focuses on a Zimbabwean family that is preparing for the wedding of their eldest daughter, Tendikayi (addressed as Tendi) who is first generation American. The play opens on Marvelous (often called Marvi by other characters), Donald, and their youngest daughter Nyasha awaiting the arrival of Tendi and her fiance Chris (who is white). We are introduced to Margaret, Marvelous’s youngest sister who comes to join in the pre-wedding festivities. Tendi and Chris arrive along with Anne, Marvelous’s eldest sister, who still lives in Zimbabwe. Tendi and Chris tell Marvelous and Donald that they wish to perform the Roora ceremony (or bride price), a Zimbabwean wedding tradition, and have it facilitated by Anne. This angers Marvelous who wishes to keep the family rooted in American, Christian tradition. The play grapples with African-American identity and tradition and the clashing of ideals.

== Characters and Cast ==
Character	Yale Repertory Theatre Cast	Playwright's Horizons Cast
Nyasha	Shyko Amos	Ito Aghayere
Chris	Ross Marquand	Joby Earle
Margaret Munyewa (Mai Tongai)	Patrice Johnson Chevannes	Melanie Nicholls-King
Tendikayi	Cherise Boothe	Roslyn Ruff
Donald Chinyaramwira	Harvy Blanks	Harold Surratt
Anne (Mai Carol)	Kimberly Scott	Myra Lucretia Taylor
Brad	Joe Tippett	Joe Tippett
Marvelous Chinyaramwira (Mai Tendi)	Saidah Arrika Ekulona	Tamara Tunie

== Critical response ==
Familiar opened to positive critical reviews for the New York engagement at Playwrights Horizons from the New York Times, and New York Magazine among others.

Charles Isherwood of The New York Times called the play “fiercely funny” and remarked on the production’s contrasting tone to Gurira’s play Eclipsed writing “Although it is just as accomplished, Familiar is a play written in a significantly lighter key, even as it probes with subtlety and smarts the subject of immigration and assimilation — a topic of major currency these days.” He goes on to compliment Gurira and Rebecca Taichman (the director of the production) “Ms. Gurira weaves issues of cultural identity and displacement, generational frictions and other meaty matters into dialogue that flows utterly naturally. Her engaging characters are drawn with sympathy and, under the crisp direction of Rebecca Taichman, Familiar stays firmly on course even as the complications pile up".

The play received positive reviews for its New Haven production. Of the New Haven production Anita Gates of The New York Times remarks "Familiar is a turn from world politics and international crises toward domestic comic drama, and she [Gurira] makes the transition seamlessly".

The Play has received a New York Times Critics Pick title.

The play received a score of 88 on Show Score from 119 reviews, which indicate "excellent" on the platform.

== Awards and nominations ==
=== Off-Broadway production ===
Year	Award	Category	Nominee	Result
2016	Obie Awards	Distinguished Performance by an Actress	Tamara Tunie	Won
2016	Lucille Lortel Awards	Outstanding Lead Actress in a Play	Ito Aghayere	Nominated
2016	Lucille Lortel Awards	Outstanding Featured Actress in a Play	Myra Lucretia Taylor	Nominated
2016	Outer Critics Circle Award	Outstanding Featured Actress in a Play	Myra Lucretia Taylor	Nominated
2016	Outer Critics Circle Award	Outstanding New Off-Broadway Play		Nominated
2016	Drama Desk Awards	Sam Norkin Award	Danai Gurira	Won

== Publication ==
- Gurira, Danai. Familiar. New York Public Library for the Performing Arts Billy Rose Theatre Division, 2016.
