= S-Town =

American investigative journalism podcast

- Artwork by Valero Doval
- Genre: Investigative journalism; Serialized audio narrative
- Language: English

Cast and voices
- Hosted by: Brian Reed

Music
- Theme music composed by: Daniel Hart
- Ending theme: "A Rose for Emily" by The Zombies

Production
- Production: Brian Reed; Julie Snyder
- Editing: Ira Glass; Joel Lovell; Sarah Koenig; Neil Drumming
- Length: 6:23:55

Technical specifications
- Audio format: Podcast (via streaming or downloadable MP3)

Publication
- No. of seasons: 1
- No. of episodes: 7
- Original release: March 28 – March 28, 2017

Related
- Website: stownpodcast.org

S-Town is an American investigative journalism podcast hosted by Brian Reed and created by the producers of Serial and This American Life. All seven chapters were released on March 28, 2017. The podcast was downloaded a record-breaking 10 million times in four days and had been downloaded over 80 million times by May 2020.

== Synopsis ==
In 2012, horologist John B. McLemore emailed the staff of the show This American Life asking them to investigate an alleged murder in his hometown of Woodstock, Alabama, a place he claimed to despise. After a year of exchanging emails and several months of conversation with McLemore, producer Brian Reed traveled to Woodstock to investigate. He investigated the crime and eventually found that no such murder took place, though he struck up a friendship with McLemore, a "depressed but colorful" character. He recorded conversations with McLemore and other people in Woodstock, which are played on the podcast.

McLemore killed himself by drinking potassium cyanide on June 22, 2015, while the podcast was still in production. In the narrative of the podcast, this occurs at the end of the second episode, and subsequent episodes deal with the fallout from McLemore's death while exploring more of McLemore's life and character. Though the podcast was promoted under the name S-Town, Reed reveals in the first episode that this is a euphemism for "Shit-Town", McLemore's derogatory term for Woodstock. Reed calls the podcast by its non-euphemized name during its episodes.

== People involved ==
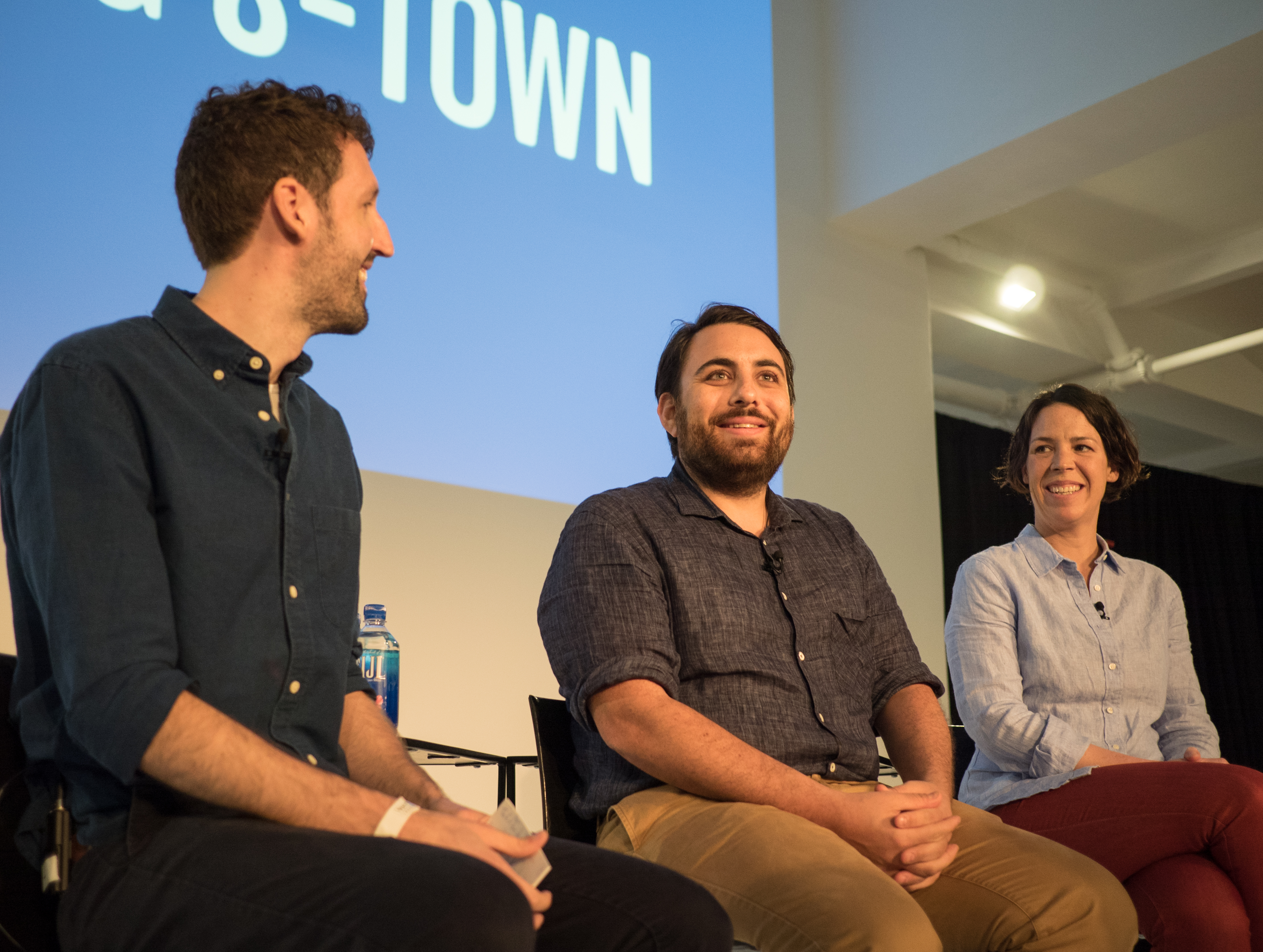
Reed (middle) and Snyder (right) being interviewed about S-Town in May 2018

- Brian Reed, host and executive producer
- John B. McLemore, horologist
- Mary Grace McLemore, John's elderly mother
- Tyler Goodson, John's younger friend and employee
- Jake Goodson, John's employee and Tyler's brother
- Kabrahm Burt, rumored to have murdered Dylon Nicols
- Dylon Nicols, purported to have been murdered by Kabrahm
- Allan "Bubba" Cresswell, co-owned a tattoo parlor with Tyler
- Skyler Goodson, Jake's wife
- Allen Bearden, John's friend, a horologist based in Pell City, Alabama
- Reta Lawrence, John's cousin
- Charlie Lawrence, Reta's husband
- Jeff Dodson, mayor of Woodstock and briefly John's business partner
- Cheryl Dodson, John's friend. Worked as Woodstock Town Clerk during John's time of delight with the town and co-owned Woodstock Garden Center with John. Interviewed in Chapter 7.
- Faye Gamble, Woodstock town clerk to whom John spoke on the phone while he died by suicide
- Boozer Downs, the town's and John's attorney.
- Michael Fuller, a former friend of John's who lives in New York City and is interviewed in Chapter 5.
- Olin Long, A friend of John's, whom John met on a singles' line for men in 2003. Almost had a love affair with John, but it was never consummated. Interviewed in Chapter 6.

== Episodes ==
All episodes were released simultaneously on March 28, 2017. The podcast is available to stream or download for free on the official website, iTunes, Stitcher, Radiopublic, or through the RSS feed.

No.	Title	Length (minutes:seconds)	Original release date
I	"If you keep your mouth shut, you'll be surprised what you can learn."	51:57	March 28, 2017
After more than a year of correspondence, investigative journalist Brian Reed visits John B. McLemore's small hometown of Woodstock, Alabama, after John requests that he investigate the murder and coverup of a young man named Dylan Nichols. John informs Brian that Kabrahm Burt bragged to an acquaintance named Jake Goodson that he had killed Dylan. After many failed attempts to speak to Jake, Brian begins to suspect that John is hiding something. Brian also meets Jake's brother, Tyler, who works for John and is very good friends with him. After days of searching for evidence with no results, Jake's wife Skylar drops by John's on a whim and confirms that she was there when Kabrahm admitted killing Dylan.
II	"Has anybody called you?"	41:11	March 28, 2017
Brian begins to question the validity of the murder; he probes for answers from the people of Woodstock only to find that they are set on the idea. Uncertain about directly confronting Kabrahm, he speaks with Tyler, tattoo artist Bubba, and other locals to learn a bit more about John. Finally, Brian seeks out Kabrahm to hear from the suspected murderer firsthand. He discovers that the murder was completely fabricated. John expresses discontent with the indifference of Woodstock's people. A couple of weeks after this discussion, Skylar calls Brian to tell him that John has died by suicide.
III	"Tedious and brief."	53:04	March 28, 2017
While shocked by John's death, Brian admits that John had discussed suicide before, usually in relation to his obsession with ecological and economic collapse. He returns to Alabama to attend John's funeral and meets Tyler, who tells Brian that he and John had a falling out the day before he died. John's mother, Mary Grace, is taken in by John's cousin, Reta, and her husband, which Tyler believes is an attempt to get to her and John's assets. A further complication is that John intended to leave his assets to Tyler, including a rumored stash of gold, but didn't leave a will, meaning Tyler has no legal right to them. Tyler says he will take Reta to court, and if that doesn't work, will take matters into his own hands.
IV	"If anybody could find it, it would be me."	61:34	March 28, 2017
V	"Nobody'll ever change my mind about it."	61:25	March 28, 2017
VI	"Since everyone around here thinks I'm a queer anyway."	46:02	March 28, 2017
VII	"You're beginning to figure it out now, aren't you?"	62:27	March 28, 2017

== Music ==
S-Town incorporates various specially composed pieces of music by Daniel Hart, Helado Negro, Trey Pollard, and Matt McGinley, including a theme produced by Hart. The show's closing music, used at the end of each episode, is "A Rose for Emily" by The Zombies.

== Further developments ==
Shortly after the podcast's release, John's online obituary was flooded with support and shared reflections from around the world. In an April 2017 interview, Tyler Goodson said he sometimes regretted "ever speaking into that microphone because I was probably upset, or wasn't thinking clearly" since he faced trial for criminal actions the podcast describes. In October 2017, Goodson pleaded guilty to burglaries described in the podcast. He was sentenced to five years on probation with a ten-year suspended sentence.

On December 3, 2023, police shot and killed Goodson at his home after a three-hour confrontation in which he allegedly brandished his weapon at them.

=== Lawsuit ===
In July 2018, McLemore's estate administrator filed a lawsuit against S-Town's production company, Serial Productions. The suit, which was filed without McLemore's family's knowledge, alleged that by selling advertisements with the podcast they violated McLemore's personality rights. In March 2019, a judge declined to dismiss the complaint, leading to depositions, a discovery phase, and mediation. Discovery revealed that McLemore actively participated and cooperated with the podcast. The case was settled in May 2020 and subsequently dismissed.

== Reception ==
S-Town was culturally popular and received mixed critical reviews. The Boston Globe's Ty Burr found it complex and voyeuristic. He asked, "is S-Town a freak show for the NPR crowd?", and called the series "seven chapters of provocative red herrings that almost but never quite add up to a place, a people, or a man". Jessica Goudeau of The Atlantic questioned the series' ethics, asking, "is it okay to confess another person's pain for the sake of a good story?" Goudeau also wondered how Flannery O'Connor, Robert Lowell, or Elizabeth Bishop would have reacted to the podcast and the exploration of poor, white, rural America. Slate's Katy Waldman wrote that S-Town feels more like a new genre, "something more like aural literature". Vox's Aja Romano called the podcast "stunning" but suggested it was too invasive and should not have been made.

The podcast's critics claimed that the studio took advantage of John's death to gain publicity. Crixeo, an online arts monthly, argues that Reed did not have the right to publicly out John as queer. At the same time, others contend that S-Town was a way for them to take the story of John's death and shed light on mental health in the U.S. The Atlantic's Spencer Kornhaber praised S-Town for its journalism and humanism, as the series "hints at the possibility of cultural reconciliation" within the community. Rebecca Nicholson of The Guardian called the series "a noble attempt at understanding life", as the series showed "the great hope that resides within" by showing a person trying to survive within their surroundings.

The Guardian gave S-Town a critical review, calling S-Town "a good story, but an indefensible one" that doesn't fully address its central quandary.

By May 2017, the podcast series had been downloaded over 40 million times. It retained a high ranking in the iTunes chart and continued to be analysed in the press well into 2017. Since then, the podcast has remained popular and had been downloaded 77 million times by the anniversary of its release.

== Awards ==
S-Town received the 2017 Peabody Award in the category Radio/Podcast. It won the Directors' Choice award at the 2017 Third Coast International Audio Festival.

George Foster Peabody Award

- 2017 WBEZ/Chicago, IL, S-Town breaks new ground for the medium by creating the first audio novel, a non-fiction biography constructed in the style and form of a 7-chapter novel.

== See also ==
- List of American crime podcasts
