= Neil Drumming =

American journalist and filmmaker

Neil Drumming is an American journalist and filmmaker. Formerly a producer with the radio show This American Life, in 2020 Drumming became managing editor with Serial Productions, the company that created the podcasts Serial and S-Town. Drumming began his career writing for the Washington City Paper, and later wrote for Entertainment Weekly and Salon. He also wrote and directed the 2014 film Big Words.

== Early life ==
Drumming attended the University of Southern California film school.

== Career ==
=== Journalism ===
After graduating from college, Drumming went to work for the Washington City Paper in 1996. He was part of a group of hires by editor David Carr that included several young black writers who went on to become voices of their generation: hired alongside Drumming that year were eventual New Yorker magazine staffer and history professor Jelani Cobb, MacArthur Genius Ta-Nehisi Coates, and performance artist and playwright Holly Bass.

From 2002 to 2007, Drumming worked as an editor and music critic for Entertainment Weekly, later moving to Salon.

=== Film ===
Drumming's first feature film, Big Words, premiered at Slamdance Film Festival in January 2013. Drumming wrote and directed.

Set on November 4, 2008, the night of Barack Obama's historic election as the first black President of the United States, Big Words revolves around three friends who 15 years earlier had had "a promising hip-hop group and are now dealing with the challenges of being in their late 30s." Selecting the film as a New York Times "Critics' Pick," Jeannette Catsoulis's review praised Drumming's "whip-smart screenplay" and "droll, insightful dialogue," describing the film as "an engrossing, coming-of-middle-age drama." Writing in The Independent, Darren Richman compared Drumming's filmmaking to Noah Baumbach, both in the directors' relationship to the characters their films depict—like Baumbach, "Drumming seems to love his characters because of rather than in spite of their flaws"—and in the films' subject matter, noting that a "sense that things haven’t quite gone to plan, reminiscent of Baumbach’s Greenberg, hangs over Big Words from first frame to last."

The collective African-American Film Festival Releasing Movement (AFFRM) distributed the film. Big Words made its New York premiere at the Brooklyn Academy of Music.

=== This American Life ===
Drumming is a producer for This American Life. He has also been on air for the show, reporting segments around themes of family and friendship. In October 2019, he became the first black person to host an episode.

In 2020, he left This American Life to become managing editor at Serial Productions, with plans to oversee an expansion from the company’s first two podcasts, Serial and S-Town.

== Personal life ==
While at the Washington City Paper in the late 1990s, Drumming became a close friend of writer Ta-Nehisi Coates, then still a student at Howard University; Drumming eventually became godfather to Coates's son. In a 2015 segment of This American Life, the two discussed the trajectory of their friendship over the next two decades of their personal lives and respective careers in media.
