= Echo Park (2014 film) =

- Film poster
- Directed by: Amanda Marsalis
- Written by: Catalina Aguilar Mastretta
- Starring: Mamie Gummer; Tony Okungbowa; Maurice Compte
- Production company: Turntable Studios
- Distributed by: ARRAY
- Release dates: June 14, 2014 (LAFF); April 15, 2016
- Running time: 88 minutes
- Country: United States
- Language: English

Echo Park is a 2014 drama romance film directed by Amanda Marsalis set in Echo Park neighborhood of Los Angeles, California. The film explores couples struggling in unhappy relationships.

== Plot ==
After listening to a morning conversation between Sophie and Simon, Sophie is buying a couch from Alex for her own apartment in working class Echo Park in Central Los Angeles. Alex, a musician, is returning to England after failing to break into films. Alex invites Sophie to join him, Mateo and his boy, Elias to play soccer in the park. After Sophie and Alex end up having sex and become friends.

Alex plays the role as rebound guy and Sophie admits she is still in love with her lifetime boyfriend but feels trapped. Sophie's rich Mom finds her and tells her to go back to Simon because she never dreamed of having Black grandchildren. Controlling rich Simon keeps telling Sophie to get over this "whatever vacation" and come back to him.

Alex's house sale falls through and Sophie agrees to buy it. Alex has fallen for Sophie but she does not ask him to stay. In fact she tells him she is returning to Simon. His friend Mateo also agrees to reconcile with his wife Martha. Alex cannot understand why couples reconcile into failed relationships. Sophie and Simon have a great fun day at a fair but at day's end Sophie knows she does not love him and the relationship really is over.

Alex completes packing to move and drives off to the airport. He leaves her favorite album in the empty house. Sophie attends Elias' art show from the photographs he made with the camera she purchased him. Alex keeps driving to the airport but will he turn around? He does not.

== Cast ==
- Mamie Gummer as Sophie
- Tony Okungbowa as Alex
- Maurice Compte as Mateo
- Ricky Rico as Elias
- Gale Harold as Simon
- Helen Slater as Julia
- Nicole Tubiola as Martha

== Release ==
In June, 2018, Echo Park is available on Netflix streaming.

== Reception ==
New York Times reviewer, Ken Jaworowski, finds the film understated and charming. He states: "It's no surprise to learn that the director, Amanda Marsalis, has a background in photography. Here, in her feature debut, she's skilled in conjuring moods by using soft images of her actors and their surroundings."
