= Tony Okungbowa =

Actor, Producer, DJ

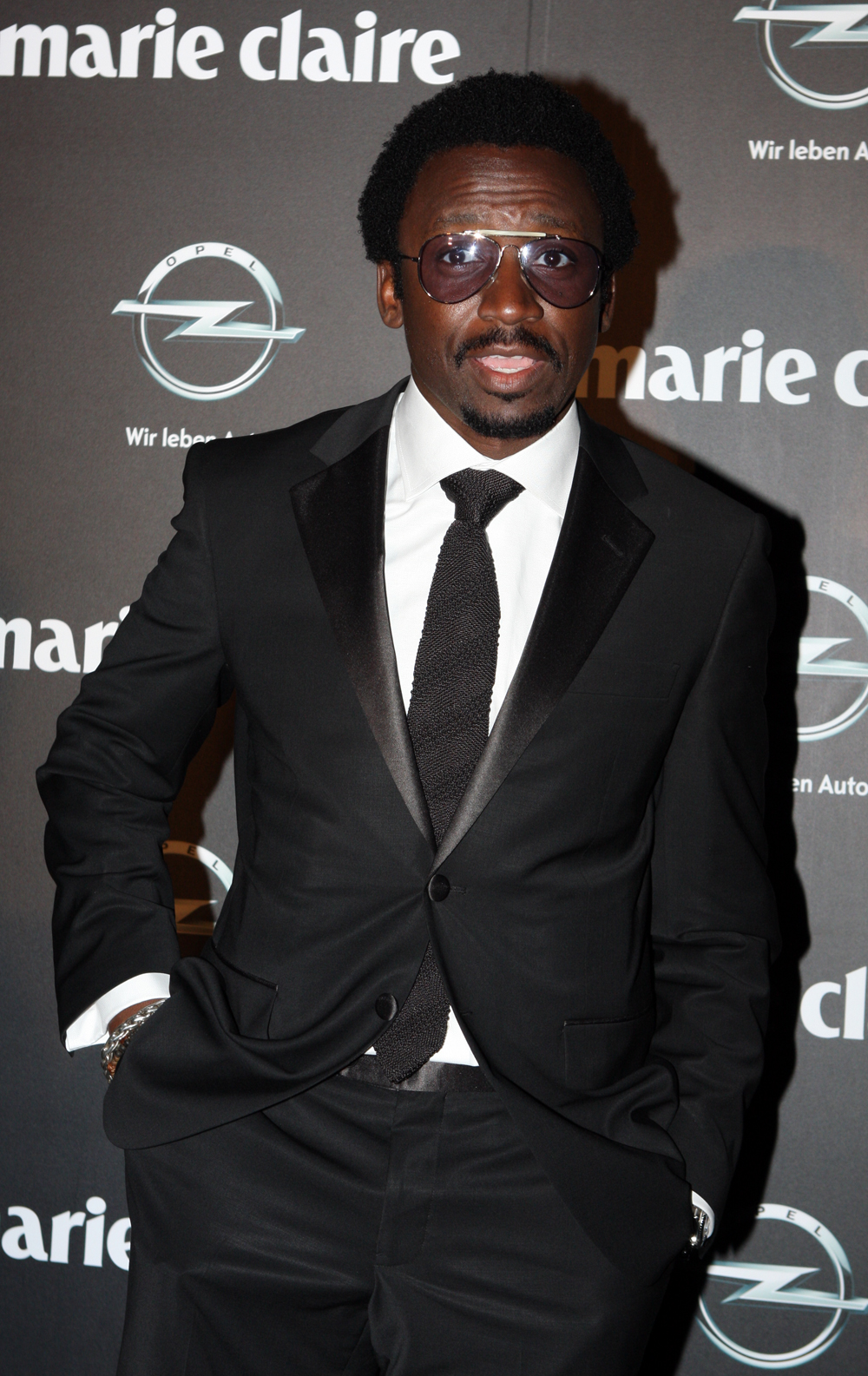
- Tony Okungbowa in 2013
- Born: Anthony Victor Okungbowa c. 1967 or 1968 (age 58–59); London, England
- Other names: Tony Okungbowa, DJ Tony O.
- Citizenship: American
- Education: Middlesex University
- Occupations: Actor, film producer, DJ
- Years active: 1994–present
- Website: tonyokungbowa.com

Anthony Victor Okungbowa (born c. 1967/1968) is an English-American actor, film producer, and DJ. He was the resident DJ for The Ellen DeGeneres Show from 2003 to 2006 and again from 2008 to 2013 when he was replaced by Stephen "tWitch" Boss. He returned as a guest on April 28, 2014. Since 2019, Okungbowa has played Kofo in the CBS sitcom Bob Hearts Abishola.

== Early life ==
Okungbowa is of Nigerian descent and grew up in Nigeria and London. He has a degree in drama from Middlesex University in Middlesex, London. He moved to New York City in 1992 to do post-graduate work at the Lee Strasberg Theatre and Film Institute; he left for Los Angeles in 1998.

== Career ==
The Ellen DeGeneres Show featured a DJ to provide musical accompaniment, a role Okungbowa began in 2003 and continued until the end of season three of the show in 2006, when he left to further his acting career. He was replaced at the beginning of season four by Jon Abrahams, who is also an actor. Okungbowa returned in 2007 making occasional substitute appearances. He returned to DJ full-time for the sixth season which began September 8, 2008. He DJ'd for the 2004 Grammy Awards.

His acting roles include guest spots on The X-Files, NYPD Blue, Law & Order: Special Victims Unit and NCIS: Los Angeles in 2014. He was executive producer of and acted in the film Restless City which had its debut at the Sundance Film Festival in Salt Lake City, Utah in 2011. As of January 7, 2013 or earlier, Okungbowa became a naturalized citizen of the United States.

== Filmography ==
Film
Year	Film	Role	Notes
1993	The Punk	Punk Friend #2	
2002	The Wild Thornberrys Movie	Ranger	Voice
2003	Gate to Heaven	Amadou	
2008	Miracle of Phil	Seth	
2009	The One Last Time	Scarecow	
2011	Restless City	Bekay	
2011	CIS: Las Gidi	The Tax Man	
2013	Mother of George	Biyi	
2014	Echo Park	Alex	
Television
Year	Title	Role	Notes
1999	The X-Files	Barnes' Driver	Episode: "The Sixth Extinction"
2000	Arli$$	Homeless Joe	Episode: "Where There's a Will"
2001	NYPD Blue	Tristan L. Gibbs	Episode: "Fools Russian"
2001; 2010	The Bold and the Beautiful	Diver/Dempsey	6 episodes
2003–06; 2008–13	The Ellen DeGeneres Show	Himself/DJ	1,672 Episode
2008	Law & Order: Special Victims Unit	Dr. Bakari	Episode: "Trials"
2014	NCIS Los Angeles	Bakari Deng	Episode: "Exposure"
2015	Kids Say the Darndest Things Nigeria	Himself/host	2 episode
2017	Ballers	Dr. Dester	Episode: "Alley-Oops"
2017	Ray Donovan	Bolaji	Episode: "Horses"
2019–2024	Bob Hearts Abishola	Kofo	Main role
2022	YE!	Lenny	

== Discography ==
=== Mixed compilations ===
- 2005: Hollywood Sessions, Vol. 1
- 2009: Total Dance 2009
- 2012: "A Night to Remember"
