= Restless City =

- Promotional poster
- Directed by: Andrew Dosunmu
- Written by: Eugene M. Gussenhoven
- Produced by: Katie Mustard; Matt Parker; David Raymond; Tony Okungbowa
- Starring: Sy Alassane; Sky Nicole Grey; Tony Okungbowa; Danai Gurira
- Cinematography: Bradford Young
- Edited by: Oriana Soddu
- Production company: Clam Prods
- Distributed by: AFFRM
- Release dates: January 23, 2011 (Sundance); April 27, 2012 (United States)
- Running time: 90 minutes
- Country: United States
- Languages: English; French

Restless City is a 2011 independent drama film written by Eugene M. Gussenhoven and directed by Andrew Dosunmu. It stars Sy Alassane, Sky Nicole Grey, Tony Okungbowa, Stephen Tyrone Williams, and Danai Gurira. The film premiered on January 23, 2011, at the 2011 Sundance Film Festival and received a limited release in the United States on April 27, 2012.

== Plot ==
Djibril, a young Senegalese immigrant, has been trying to make a life for himself in the streets of Harlem in New York. An aspiring musician, he hopes to one day score a record deal, but after four years in the United States he still scrapes together a living by selling CDs on the street and taking on gigs as a courier with the help of his moped. To raise enough money to make an album, Djibril agrees to work for Bekay, a pimp and loan shark. Djilbri's mission to fulfill his dream is interrupted when he meets Trini, a prostitute who works for Bekay. Djibril risks everything to save Trini from her squalid life.

== Cast ==
- Sy Alassane as Djibril
- Sky Nicole Grey as Trini
- Tony Okungbowa as Bekay
- Danai Gurira as Sisi
- Babs Olusanmokun as Cravate
- Hervé Diese as Lido
- Ger Duany as Rocky
- Momo Dione as Pesher
- Osas Ighodaro as Adinike
- Lenore Thomas Douglas as Candy
- Maduka Steady as Ten Step
- Aspen Steib as Letta
- Stephen Tyrone Williams as Kareem

== Reception ==
On the review aggregator website Rotten Tomatoes, 45% of 11 critics' reviews are positive, with an average rating of 6/10.

In a positive review, Wesley Morris of The Boston Globe wrote, "'Restless City' is tumescent with atmosphere", and "there’s a dreamy immediacy to life in [Dosunmu’s] Harlem as opposed to the drugginess of life" of other films. Ernest Hardy of The Village Voice said, "Told in an elliptical style with a pacing and jagged rhythms that take some getting used to, the thrust and power of the film lies in its poetic imagery, in the way Dosunmu and cinematographer Bradford Young use light and composition to make almost every frame (breathtaking profiles; close-ups on faces and feet; slo-mo moped rides down city streets) stunning. The cumulative effect of their visual handiwork brings an unexpected impact when tragedy finally strikes."
