= My Name Is Albert Ayler (film) =

- Directed by: Kasper Collin
- Written by: Kasper Collin
- Produced by: Kasper Collin
- Cinematography: Peter Palm, Askild Vik Edvardsen
- Edited by: Eva Hillström, Kasper Collin, Patrick Austen
- Music by: Albert Ayler and more
- Release date: February 4, 2005
- Countries: Sweden; United States
- Language: English

My Name Is Albert Ayler is a 2005 Swedish-American documentary film about the American Jazz musician Albert Ayler, written and directed by Kasper Collin.

Described by Thomas Conrad of JazzTimes as "one of the most starkly beautiful and moving documentaries ever made about a jazz musician," the film was produced and edited over a period of seven years (1998 to 2005), and features footage of live performances as well as interviews with Ayler conducted between 1963 and 1970. In addition, the filmmakers interviewed surviving family members, including Ayler's father Edward and brother Donald, and associates such as drummer Sunny Murray, double bassist Gary Peacock, and photographer and writer Val Wilmer.

The film met with mixed reviews when released in Sweden in 2005, but was praised by UK and US critics when theatrically released in those countries in 2007. Metacritic gave the film 83/100 based on reviews from 7 critics, and awarded it the 19th best film from 2007. On Rotten Tomatoes the film has an approval rating of 94% based on reviews from 17 critics.

My Name Is Albert Ayler was director Kasper Collin's first feature documentary. The second was I Called Him Morgan, a documentary about trumpeter Lee Morgan.
