= C. Fitz =

C. Fitz is an advertising, marketing and filmmaking professional. In her digital work she has produced social media branding campaigns winning four Webby’s for creative content. As a filmmaker, TV showrunner and film director she has won multiple awards for her scripted and unscripted work. She is also an activist and speaker.

== Career ==
=== Journalism ===
Fitz started her journalism career while still attending Emerson College for her master's degree. She worked as a production assistant for the Today Show, as well as, a weekend radio news anchor for WCAP in Lowell, MA. She won the Mark of Excellence Award from the Society of Journalism for her investigative news report on dirty needles and drug use in the lower income Boston neighborhoods.

=== Filmmaker ===
Fitz began her filmmaking and writing career in documentaries and scripted shorts while attending Clark University. Her films, No More Roses and Rancid were screened at the Rhode Island International Film Festival and New England Film Festival in Boston. Rancid won the 'Director's Choice' award for her directing from the New England Film and Video Festival.

In 2009 Fitz released her first feature documentary, ShowGirls, Provincetown, MA. It took her five years to create and screened across the country at film festivals such as Palm Springs International Film Festival and Provincetown International Film Festival. ShowGirls, Provincetown, MA documents a group of talented locals during the summer hustle vying for the top prize of 'ShowGirl of the Year' in the beautiful seaport town of Provincetown, MA.

In April 2010 Fitz's second feature documentary, Jewel's Catch One, started shooting. Eight years in the making this film tells the history of an important unwritten textbook of one of the original safe spaces for the LGBTQ, Black and AIDS impacted communities.

In 2016 Fitz released the film festival version of Jewel's Catch One to critical acclaim. The film premiered at Provincetown International Film Festival on June 19, 2016, followed by a Los Angeles Premiere at Outfest on July 10, 2016, a New York Premiere at UrbanWorld Film Festival on September 25, 2016, and its European Premiere at BFI London Film Festival October 9, 2016. The film documented forty years of history and celebrated the legacy of a legendary Los Angeles nightclub, Jewel's Catch One, its community and the life-changing impact its owner, Jewel Thais-Williams, had on her community breaking down racial and cultural barriers and building the oldest black-owned disco in America. Jewel’s Catch One covers four decades of Los Angeles history, its music, fashion, celebrities and activism. Variety Magazine called the film “an undeniably loving documentary tribute by director C. Fitz to the club and its longtime owner Jewel.” Through interviews and performances from Thelma Houston, Sharon Stone, Maxine Waters, Jenifer Lewis, Bonnie Pointer, Thea Austin, and Sandra Bernhard plus rare archival footage of Madonna at the club, C. Fitz, documents how the club grew to be known as the unofficial Studio 54 of the west coast with one exception: everyone was allowed in without judgement. The film culminates with Jewel and her Catch community becoming a national model of how to fight discrimination and serve the less fortunate. The film follows Jewel as she buys the building next door to Jewel's Catch One and builds a non-profit health clinic. The film covers the Catch One family battling tirelessly against racism, homophobia, and hate for over forty-two years to keep the club doors open to everyone through its closing in 2015. The award-winning film screened internationally in the film festival circuit in over fifty film festivals to sold out theaters including BFI, Palm Springs Film Festival (Best of Fest’ list January 10, 2017), UrbanWorld Film Festival, and Melbourne Documentary Film Festival. In 2016 The Advocate named Jewel's Catch One one of Best LGBTQ documentaries to watch. AfterEllen's Daniela Costa called the film a 'must see' and the film 'brilliantly done.

In the spring of 2018 Ava DuVernay obtained the distribution rights to the film (co-produced with Dancing Pictures LLC) with her distribution company ARRAY. ARRAY released the Jewel’s Catch One documentary on Netflix May 1, with a US National screening tour to follow. It was released internationally in five countries (US, UK, New Zealand, Australia, and Canada) on Netflix and has won four awards for “Best Documentary”, and a Top Jury award. In November 2018 Out Magazine listed Jewel's Catch One as one of the best 2018 LGBTQ films on Netflix. The feature documentary was named one of the best LGBTQ films to watch on Netflix of all time by Logo TV’s NEWNOWNEXT in 2018.

Also in 2018 she produced, and directed the live action on, a short film with Sharon Stone titled An Undeniable Voice.

=== Commercial broadcast and digital producer ===
In 1990 Fitz started working in commercials. She worked her way up the ladder in the industry starting out as a production assistant and then moved on to a second AD, first AD and eventually a line producer. During her tenure in Broadcast commercials she produced two commercials that won Promax awards. SKY1’s promo for the series 24 won gold and their promo for hit show Prison Break won silver.

In 2012 Fitz returned to advertising, marketing and social media as a Digital Creative Producer, Director and manager. She worked for clients such as Disney, Ford, HBO, Showtime, AT&T and Qualcomm through her company Dancing Pictures LLC, as well as, working direct to client and the creative company, Denizen.

Working with the Denizen Group as their Creative Producer the team won four Webby Awards on digital branding pieces in 2014, 2015, and (2) in 2018.

The following were produced by C. Fitz for The Denizen Group.

- Webby Winner 2018 Disney's Star Wars "The Last Jedi" (+2 million views Facebook)
- Webby Winner 2018 Winner Johnny Depp Surprises Disneyland (+16 million views Facebook)
- Webby Winner 2015 “Tiny Hamsters Eating Tiny Burritos” (+12 million views YouTube)
- Webby Winner 2014 Qualcomm “Best Bus Stop” (+6 million views YouTube + worldwide)

=== TV producer ===
Fitz started producing TV when her location scouts Michael Williams and David Collins from Scout Productions got a pilot greenlight from Bravo in 2003. Together with David Metzler they created the pilot to Queer Eye for the Straight Guy. Fitz was the pilot producer handling financials, product placement, logistics for casting, production, post, and co-wrote the new format. The first season of Queer Eye aired July 2003. For its first season the show won an Emmy, Producer's Guild Award, and GLAAD award.

Fitz continued her unscripted work in 2003 with Scout Productions and went on to build their next show, Knock First, for ABC Family. There were 104 episodes in two years. Fitz was the Supervising Producer and Showrunner on the series through 2005.
