= The Take (2027 film) =

- Release poster
- Directed by: Fernando Meirelles
- Written by: Simon Kinberg
- Produced by: Simon Kinberg; Audrey Chon; Fernando Meirelles
- Starring: Denzel Washington; Robert Pattinson; Daisy Edgar-Jones; Danai Gurira; Sean Harris; Moisés Arias; Justin Kirk
- Cinematography: César Charlone
- Production company: Genre Films
- Distributed by: Netflix
- Release date: January 15, 2027
- Country: United States
- Language: English

The Take is an upcoming American heist film directed by Fernando Meirelles and written by Simon Kinberg. The film stars Denzel Washington, Robert Pattinson, Daisy Edgar-Jones, Danai Gurira, Sean Harris, Moisés Arias, and Justin Kirk.

It is scheduled to be released on Netflix on January 15, 2027.

== Premise ==
A bank guard, a teller, and a master thief get caught in a deadly game of cons and double crosses.

== Cast ==
- Denzel Washington as Christian Carter, a master thief who recruits Noah for a high-profile bank robbery
- Robert Pattinson as Noah, a former United States Army captain readjusting to civilian life in New York City
- Daisy Edgar-Jones as Rose, Noah's girlfriend and a bank teller
- Danai Gurira
- Sean Harris
- Moisés Arias
- Justin Kirk

== Production ==
=== Development ===
In May 2020, Netflix acquired the rights to Simon Kinberg's script Here Comes the Flood in a seven-figure deal. In July 2020, Jason Bateman was in talks to direct and potentially star.

=== Casting ===
It was announced in May 2025 that Denzel Washington, Robert Pattinson and Daisy Edgar-Jones were set to star in the film, with Fernando Meirelles directing. In November 2025, Danai Gurira, Sean Harris, Moisés Arias and Justin Kirk joined the cast.

=== Filming ===
Principal photography began on November 3, 2025, with filming occurring between Jersey City, Hoboken, Newark, Atlanta, and New York City. Filming wrapped on January 22, 2026.

== Release ==
In October 2026, it was reported that the film had been retitled from Here Comes the Flood to The Take. It is scheduled to be released in select theaters and on Netflix on January 15, 2027.
