= Dorian Missick =

American actor (born 1976)

- Born: Dorian Crossmond Missick; January 15, 1976 (age 50); East Orange, New Jersey, U.S.
- Occupation: Actor
- Years active: 1990–present
- Spouse: Simone Missick (m. 2012)

Dorian Crossmond Missick (born January 15, 1976) is an American actor known for his role as Damian Henry in the television series Six Degrees (2006–2007) and for voicing Victor Vance in the 2006 video game Grand Theft Auto: Vice City Stories. He is also known for his starring role in the film Premium (2006) and his supporting roles in films such as The Manchurian Candidate (2004) and Lucky Number Slevin (2006).

== Early life and education ==
Dorian Crossmond Missick was born on January 15, 1976 in East Orange, New Jersey, and grew up in North Plainfield, New Jersey.

== Career ==
During his first acting class, casting agents were casting for a Coca-Cola commercial, and they decided that Missick was right for the part. He was later cast in a small role on In the Heat of the Night (1990), playing a young fisherman.

In the summer of 1996, Missick joined the Jazz Actors, a theater company in Harlem, where he studied under Ernie McClintock, whose jazz-influenced style strongly impacted Missick's in turn. After the company dispersed, Missick joined NITE Star, an educational company whose primary focus was to educate young teens on AIDS awareness and building an understanding towards alternative lifestyles. During his time with NITE Star, Missick met actress Kerry Washington (who was also involved with the company) and gained a steady income from commercials, averaging around seven nationals a year.

In 2002, Missick made his professional acting debut in Two Weeks Notice, playing Tony, Hugh Grant's right-hand man/limo driver. His exposure from that role led to parts in TV shows including NYPD Blue, Law & Order, Now and Again, and Buffy the Vampire Slayer, as well as small roles in movies such as Undermind, 50 Ways to Leave a Lover, A Message from Pops, Freedomland, and Two Guns. He auditioned for the role of Antwone Quenton 'Fish' Fisher in Antwone Fisher; he was not cast, but his meeting with Denzel Washington later led to a role in The Manchurian Candidate. Soon after, Missick got a role playing Elvis in Lucky Number Slevin, and soon afterward landed his first leading role in Premium alongside Zoe Saldaña.

In 2018, he had a recurring role in the second season of the Netflix and Marvel Cinematic Universe series Luke Cage. Missick portrayed Dontrell "Cockroach" Hamilton, an ex-con previously locked up by Misty Knight, who is played by his real-life wife and series regular Simone Missick. In July 2018, he joined the main cast of the CBS All Access series Tell Me a Story as Sam.

== Personal life ==
Missick married his wife, actress Simone Missick, in February 2012. In 2009, he met Simone during an audition, where they first crossed paths.

== Filmography ==
=== Film ===
Year	Title	Role	Notes
1998	Two Way Crossing	Leon	
2000	3D	Jeff Sellers	Short
2000	Shaft	Young Man	
2002	Two Weeks Notice	Tony	
2003	Crime Partners	James Brown	
2003	Undermind	Train Rapper	
2004	50 Ways to Leave Your Lover	Rob	
2004	The Manchurian Candidate	Owens	
2004	Chameleon	Charlie	Short
2005	Two Guns	-	Video
2005	A Message from Pops	Son	Short
2006	Freedomland	Jason Council	
2006	Lucky Number Slevin	Elvis	
2006	Premium	Cool	
2007	Mama's Boy	Mitch	
2008	Love Me Through It	Acting Coach	Video
2008	Jury of Our Peers	Dashawn	
2008	Rachel Getting Married	Rehearsal Dinner Guest	
2008	Broken	Max	Short
2010	The Bounty Hunter	Bobby	
2010	Mooz-lum	Professor Jamal	
2010	Three Blind Mice	Travis Mitchell	Short
2011	Grace	-	Short
2013	Big Words	John	
2013	Things Never Said	Steve	
2014	One Roll	Lester	Short
2014	Deliver Us from Evil	Gordon	
2014	Annie	Annie's 'Dad'	
2015	The Summoning	Wayne	
2015	Black Card	Leonard	Short
2016	9 Rides	Driver	
2018	Monster	Asa Briggs	
2018	As Evil Does	Dominic	
2018	Jinn	David	
2018	Brian Banks	Officer Mick Randolph	
2019	#Truth	Stewart Cooper	
2019	Paper Friends	Carson	
2019	About The People	The Preacher	Short
2023	The Burial	Reggie Douglas	
2024	Shirley	Ron Dellums	

=== Television ===
Year	Title	Role	Notes
1990	In the Heat of the Night	Young Fisherman	Episode: "An Angry Woman"
2000	Now and Again	Marlin	Episode: "Boy Wonder"
2001	Law & Order: Special Victims Unit	Leon Tate	Episode: "Rooftop"
2001	Philly	Dorian's Crony	Episode: "Blown Away"
2001	NYPD Blue	Gerald Winters	Episode: "Hit the Road, Clark"
2001	Law & Order	Henry Williams	Episode: "A Losing Season"
2003	Buffy the Vampire Slayer	Police Officer	Episode: "Empty Places"
2004	Law & Order	Ronald Duggan a.k.a. Slug	Episodes "Can I Get a Witness"
2004	CSI: NY	Jayden Prince	Episode: "Grand Master"
2006	Conviction	Frank Jeffers	Episode: "180.80" & "Hostage"
2006–2007	Six Degrees	Damian Henry	Main Cast
2008	Numb3rs	Derek Raines	Episode: "Pay to Play"
2009	Raising the Bar	Sylvester 'Slice' Walters	Episode: "Trust Me"
2009	Bones	Owen Thiel	Episode: "The Goop on the Girl"
2010	Sons of Anarchy	Pony Joe	Episode: "So"
2011	The Cape	Marty Voyt	Main Cast
2012–2013	Southland	Detective Ruben Robinson	Recurring Cast: Season 4–5
2012–2013	Lenox Avenue	Sellars	Main Cast
2012	Haven	Tommy Bowen and Arla Cogan	6 episodes
2014	Being Mary Jane	Detective Cedric Rawlins	Episode: "Hindsight Is 20/40"
2014	Rake	Blake	Episode: "50 Shades of Gay"
2015	Better Call Saul	Detective Dunst	Episode: "Nacho" & "Hero"
2015	The Good Wife	Brett Tatro	Episode: "Don't Fail"
2015	The Brink	Agent	Episode: "I'll Never Be Batman" & "Swim, Shmuley, Swim"
2016	Zoe Ever After	Gemini Moon	Main Cast
2016	Lucifer	Will Flemming	Episode: "St. Lucifer"
2016	Elementary	Glibride/Agent Whitlock	Episode: "To Catch a Predator Predator" & "It Serves You Right to Suffer"
2016–2017	Animal Kingdom	Patrick Fischer	Recurring Cast: Season 1–2
2018	Unsolved	Scott Shephard	Episode: "Nobody Talks"
2018	Luke Cage	Dontrell "Cockroach" Hamilton	Recurring Cast: Season 2
2018–2019	Tell Me a Story	Sam Reynolds	Main Cast: Season 1
2020	Soul City	Andrew	Episode: "Pillowshop"
2020–2021	For Life	Jamal Bishop	Main Cast
2020–2021	All Rise	DJ Tailwind Turner	Guest Cast: Season 1–2
2021	Rebel	Rick	Episode: "The Right Thing" & "Heart Burned"
2026	56 Days	Karl Connolly	Main Cast

=== Music video ===
Year	Song	Artist	Role
1994	"Ease My Mind"	Arrested Development	Guy in Car

=== Video Games ===
Year	Title	Role	Notes
2005	Crime Life: Gang Wars	(voice)	
2006	Grand Theft Auto: Vice City Stories	Victor 'Vic' Vance (voice)	
