= Mother of George =

2013 drama film

- Theatrical release poster
- Directed by: Andrew Dosunmu
- Written by: Darci Picoult
- Produced by: Patrick S. Cunningham; Lars Knudsen
- Starring: Isaach de Bankolé; Danai Gurira; Bukky Ajayi; Tony Okungbowa; Yaya DaCosta
- Cinematography: Bradford Young
- Edited by: Oriana Soddu
- Distributed by: Oscilloscope Laboratories
- Release dates: 18 January 2013 (Sundance Film Festival); 13 September 2013 (United States)
- Running time: 106 minutes
- Countries: Nigeria; United States
- Languages: Yoruba; English

Mother of George is a 2013 drama film directed by Andrew Dosunmu and tells the story of a newly married Nigerian couple in Brooklyn who own and manage a small restaurant while struggling with fertility issues. The film was produced by Patrick S. Cunningham and Rhea Scott.

An international co-production of Nigeria and the United States, Mother of George premiered in the U.S. Dramatic Competition at the 2013 Sundance Film Festival. Cinematographer Bradford Young won Sundance 2013's Cinematography Award: U.S. Dramatic for his work on the film, as well as for Ain't Them Bodies Saints. Mother of George was also selected as the closing night film at the 2013 Maryland Film Festival.

The film was acquired for U.S. distribution by Oscilloscope Laboratories and was given a limited theatrical release on 13 September 2013.

== Plot ==
The film opens with the wedding of a Nigerian couple, Ayodele and Adenike Balogun. Adenike is given fertility beads by her mother-in-law, Mama Ayo and although the couple makes love on their first night of marriage, Adenike struggles to become pregnant. Despite drinking tea that is supposed to help with fertility, Adenike is still unable to conceive and faces growing pressure from Mama Ayo. A visit to the doctor reveals that Adenike can receive help on the issue, but Ayodele refuses to cooperate.

Sade mentions adoption but Adenike insists that she wants to give birth to the child herself. Mama Ayo raises a controversial option: Adenike could conceive the child with Ayodele's brother, Biyi. Biyi initially refuses to participate in the scheme but eventually gives in. Following this Adenike becomes pregnant. Ayodele believes he is the father.

The guilt becomes too much for Adenike to bear, and she finally tells her husband the truth. Ayodele subsequently walks out of the marriage and confronts his mother. Adenike goes into labor, and the film concludes as Ayodele joins the others at the hospital.

== Cast ==
- Isaach de Bankolé as Ayodele Balogun
- Danai Gurira as Adenike Balogun
- Bukky Ajayi as Ma Ayo Balogun
- Tony Okungbowa as Biyi Balogun
- Yaya DaCosta as Sade Bakere
- Klarissa Jackson as Atibo
- Ishmael Omolade as Dave
- Roslyn Ruff as Doctor
- Chinaza Uche as Frank
- Florence Egbuchulam as Funke
- Mutiyat Ade-Salu as Helen
- Deen Badarou as Mr. Lawal
- Susan Heyward as Monica
- Ebbe Bassey as Yinka
- Babs Olusanmokun as Tunde
- Hubert Point Du Jour as Tony

== Reception ==
On the review aggregator website Rotten Tomatoes, 91% of 45 critics' reviews are positive. The website's consensus reads: "Director Andrew Dosunmu's style takes some getting used to, but Mother of George compensates with powerful acting, a thoughtful script, and gorgeous visuals." Metacritic, which uses a weighted average, assigned the film a score of 77 out of 100, based on 21 critics, indicating "generally favorable" reviews.

On Africa is a Country, Steffan Horowitz praised the camera work, setting, and plot, although the screenplay has received some criticism. It was listed as a New York Times Critics’ Pick.
