= Kasper Collin =

Swedish director, film producer and screenwriter

- Born: 16 November 1972 (age 53); Gothenburg, Sweden
- Occupations: Film director, Film producer, Film editor, Scriptwriter, Cinematographer
- Years active: 1998–present
- Children: 2

Kasper Collin (born 16 November 1972) is a Swedish film director, documentary filmmaker, screenwriter and film producer based in Gothenburg, Sweden.

His first feature documentary was My Name Is Albert Ayler which was well received when it opened theatrically in UK and US in 2007 and 2008. Metacritic gives the film 83 out of 100 and has awarded it the 19th best film from 2007. Rotten Tomatoes gives the film a score of 94%.

His second feature documentary I Called Him Morgan premiered on 1 September 2016 at the 73rd Venice Film Festival. After Venice it went on to play Telluride Film Festival, Toronto International Film Festival, New York Film Festival and BFI London Film Festival. I Called Him Morgan had its US theatrical premiere on 24 March 2017, and its Swedish theatrical premiere on 31 March. On 24 July 2017 the film premiered on Netflix worldwide (to whom it was sold during the 2016 Toronto International Film Festival), except in the UK and Sweden. The UK premiere was on 8 August 2017. There are 20 reviews registered at Metacritic. Eight of them are registered as 100 out of 100, and the film has reached a score of 90 out of 100. On 1 July 2017 Metacritic announced the film as the best reviewed film of the first half of 2017. By the end of the year it ended up as the seventh best reviewed movie and the third best reviewed documentary of 2017 based on its score. On Rotten Tomatoes, the film has a 96% score based on 52 reviews. The site's consensus states: "I Called Him Morgan doubles as a seductive tribute to its subject's jazz passion as well as an absorbing look at a fatally doomed relationship". I Called Him Morgan was included in "The Best Movies of 2017" in New York Times, New Yorker, Time, Esquire, Village Voice, and more.

Indiewire listed Kasper Collin as one of nine breakthrough names to look out for at Toronto International Film Festival 2016.

Between 2009 and 2014 Kasper Collin was one of two chairmen of the Swedish independent filmmakers' organization (Oberoende Filmares Förbund).

== Filmography ==
- My Name Is Albert Ayler (2005)
- I Called Him Morgan (2016)
