= Andrew Dosunmu =

Nigerian photographer and filmmaker

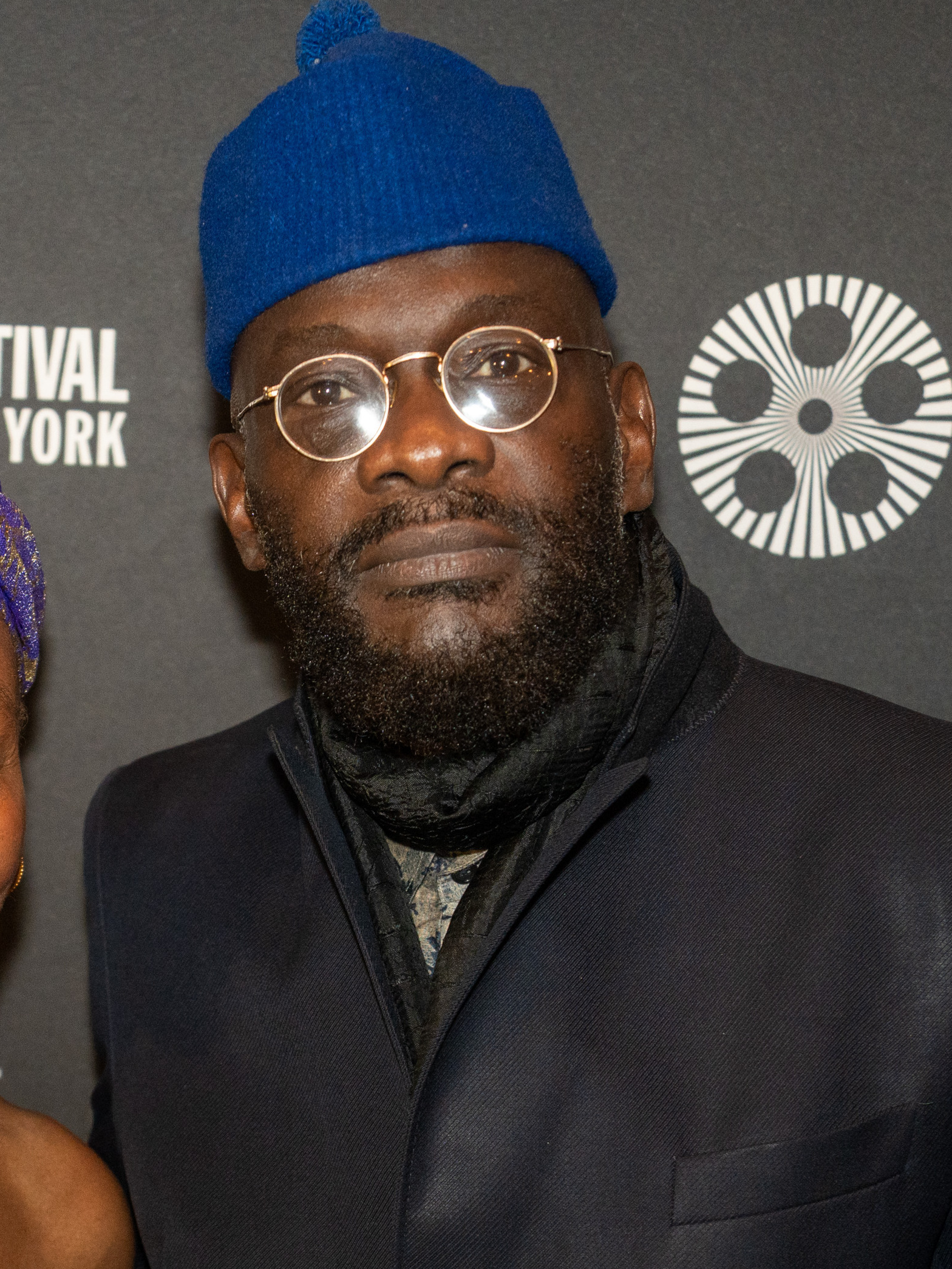
- Dosunmu at the 2025 New York African Film Festival
- Born: Lagos, Nigeria
- Occupation(s): Photographer, film director
- Years active: 1990–present
- Website: andrewdosunmu.com

Andrew Dosunmu is a Nigerian photographer and filmmaker who came to prominence in the United States after directing music videos for various artists including Isaac Hayes, Angie Stone, Common, Tracy Chapman, Wyclef Jean, Kelis, Aaron Neville, Talib Kweli, and Maxwell.

He is the director of the 2011 drama film Restless City, which premiered at the 2011 Sundance Film Festival. His next film, 2013's Mother of George, also premiered at Sundance, and was the Closing Night selection for Maryland Film Festival 2013. Dosunmu lives between New York City and Lagos, Nigeria.

== Career ==
Photography

Dosunmu started his career as a design assistant at the fashion house of Yves Saint Laurent. He later became a creative director (serving in that position for album covers for such artists as Erykah Badu and Public Enemy) and a fashion photographer, with his photographs appearing in various international magazines. In 2007, he was honored with the request to speak at the TED Global conference. Dosunmu has directed and photographed numerous commercials for print advertising & TV for companies such as AT&T, General Motors, Levi's, Giordano Jeans, Kenneth Cole, Buddy System for ABC, My Kind of Town for AMES, Soul Food for Showtime. Photographs from his documentary The African Game were published in a coffee-table book by powerHouse Books. Dosunmu was recently selected to participate in the photography exhibition Snap Judgments: New Positions in Contemporary Photography at the International Center of Photography. Dosunmu has been a contributing photographer for publications like Vibe, Clam, Fader, Face, Paper, Interview, i-D, Vogue Hommes – France and Italy, Complex, and Ebony.

== Directing ==
Dosunmu made his directorial debut with a music video for Isaac Hayes in 1996. He went on to direct music videos for many other artists including Angie Stone, Common, Wyclef Jean, Kelis, Aaron Neville, Maxwell, Tracy Chapman and Talib Kweli. His 1999 documentary "Hot Irons", won best documentary at FESPACO. Dosunmu has directed episodes of a South African television series Yizo, Yizo, which dramatizes the policy debates around education at a Johannesburg high school in post-apartheid South Africa. In 2010, in a lead up to the first ever World Cup in Africa, Dosunmu produced another documentary, The African Game, in which he explores the game of football (soccer) in the continent and its relations to the African culture in all its diversity. His transition into feature films came in 2011 with the film Restless City, which premiered at the Sundance Film Festival to generally positive reviews.

== Filmography ==
Year	Title	Role	Genre	Awards
1999	Hot Irons	Director	Documentary	Best Documentary FESPACO and Reel Award
2004	Yizo Yizo	Director	TV series	
2010	The African Game	Director/producer	Documentary/sports	
2011	Restless City	Director	Drama/music	
2013	Mother of George	Director	Drama	Closing night selection, Maryland Film Festival
2017	Where Is Kyra?	Director/Story writer	Drama	
2022	Beauty	Director	Drama, romance	
2023	Circus Maximus	Director "Hyaena"	Music	
