= Welcome to the Family =

Welcome to the Family may refer to:

- "Welcome to the Family" (song), a 2010 song by Avenged Sevenfold
- "Welcome to the Family (Canada's Drag Race)", a 2020 television episode
- "Welcome to the Family (The Neighborhood)", a 2021 television episode
- Welcome to the Family (album), a 2001 compilation album from Drive-Thru Records
- Welcome to the Family (American TV series), a 2013 NBC TV series
- Welcome to the Family (2018 TV series), a 2018–19 TV3 series

== See also ==
- Welcome to the Family, Baby
