= Crutch (TV series) =

American sitcom

- Genre: Sitcom
- Created by: Owen Smith
- Starring: Adrian Martinez; Adrianna Mitchell; Braxton Paul; Finn Maloney; Jermaine Fowler; Kecia Lewis; Tracy Morgan
- Country of origin: United States
- Original language: English
- No. of seasons: 1
- No. of episodes: 8

Production
- Executive producers: Aaron Kaplan; Cedric the Entertainer; Eric C. Rhone; Mike Mariano; Owen Smith; Tracy Morgan; Wendi Trilling
- Camera setup: Multi-camera
- Running time: 30 minutes
- Production companies: Light Shine Productions; Streetlife Productions, Inc.; A Bird and a Bear Entertainment; Kapital Entertainment; Trill TV; CBS Studios

Original release
- Network: Paramount+
- Release: November 3, 2025

Crutch is an American television sitcom comedy series that is a spin-off to the CBS sitcom The Neighborhood. The show was released on November 3, 2025 starring Tracy Morgan, reprising his role as Francois "Crutch" / "Frank" Crutchfield, the Harlem-dwelling cousin of Calvin Butler (played by Cedric the Entertainer) from the parent series The Neighborhood, and was cancelled in July 2026, after one season. The series is produced by Light Shine Productions, Streetlife Productions, Inc., A Bird and a Bear Entertainment, Kapital Entertainment, Trill TV, and CBS Studios.

== Synopsis ==
The series centers on Frank Crutchfield (Tracy Morgan), a Harlem widower whose empty nest plans are put on hold after his millennial son and free-spirited daughter move back home.

== Cast ==
- Tracy Morgan as Frank Crutchfield
- Adrian Martinez as Flaco
- Adrianna Mitchell as Jamilah
- Braxton Paul as Lisa
- Finn Maloney as Mase
- Jermaine Fowler as Jake Crutchfield
- Kecia Lewis as Antoinette

== Episodes ==
No.	Title	Directed by	Written by	Original release date
1	"Financial Crutch"	Oz Scott	Owen H.M. Smith & Bradley Gil Lewis & Marina Franklin	November 3, 2025
2	"Crazy Crutch"	Oz Scott	Mike Mariano & Bradley Gil Lewis & Marina Franklin	November 3, 2025
3	"Emotional Crutch"	Kim Fields	Mike Mariano & Bradley Gil Lewis & Marina Franklin	November 3, 2025
4	"Coach Crutch"	Kim Fields	Tracey Ashley & Bradley Gil Lewis & Marina Franklin	November 3, 2025
5	"Community Crutch"	Robbie Countryman	Marc Theobald & Bradley Gil Lewis & Marina Franklin	November 3, 2025
6	"Legal Crutch"	Beth McCarthy-Miller	Lamar Woods & Bradley Gil Lewis & Marina Franklin	November 3, 2025
7	"Matchmaker Crutch"	John Fortenberry	Bradley Gil Lewis & Marina Franklin	November 3, 2025
8	"Free Crutch"	John Fortenberry	Owen H.M. Smith & Bradley Gil Lewis & Marina Franklin	November 3, 2025

== Production ==
On May 6, 2024, it was reported that a spin-off of The Neighborhood had been picked up by Paramount+ with the title Crutch, introducing Tracy Morgan as the new character of Francois "Crutch" Crutchfield, Calvin's cousin. All eight episodes of the series were released on November 3, 2025. In July 2026, Paramount+ canceled the series after one season.
