= The Neighborhood (TV series) =

American television sitcom (2018–2026)

- Genre: Sitcom
- Created by: Jim Reynolds
- Showrunners: Jim Reynolds; Meg DeLoatch; Bill Martin; Mike Schiff
- Starring: Cedric the Entertainer; Max Greenfield; Sheaun McKinney; Marcel Spears; Hank Greenspan; Tichina Arnold; Beth Behrs; Skye Townsend
- Theme music composer: Kurt Farquhar; Nkenge 1x
- Composer: Kurt Farquhar
- Country of origin: United States
- Original language: English
- No. of seasons: 8
- No. of episodes: 155 (list of episodes)

Production
- Executive producers: Jim Reynolds; Cedric the Entertainer; Eric C. Rhone; Aaron Kaplan; Wendi Trilling; Dana Honor; James Burrows; Meg DeLoatch; Bill Martin; Mike Schiff; Antonia F. March; Jacqueline McKinley
- Producers: Patrick Kienlen; Jess Pineda; Charles Brottmiller; Sean Veder; Chris Poulos; Mark Nasser
- Cinematography: Christian La Fountaine; Michael Franks
- Editors: Wendell Johnson; Chris Poulos; Tim DeLone
- Camera setup: Multi-camera
- Running time: 22 minutes
- Production companies: Mud, Blood & Beer Productions; A Bird and a Bear Entertainment; Kapital Entertainment; Trill Television; CBS Studios (Note: Credited as CBS Television Studios for the first two seasons.)

Original release
- Network: CBS
- Release: October 1, 2018 – May 11, 2026

Related
- Crutch

The Neighborhood is an American television sitcom created by Jim Reynolds that aired on CBS from October 1, 2018 to May 11, 2026. The series follows a white Midwestern family as they adjust to moving into a predominantly black neighborhood in Pasadena, California. It stars Cedric the Entertainer, Max Greenfield, Tichina Arnold, Beth Behrs, Sheaun McKinney, Marcel Spears and Hank Greenspan.

== Premise ==
The Neighborhood follows Dave Johnson, the "nicest guy in the Midwest", who moves his white family into a predominantly black neighborhood in suburban Los Angeles, where not everyone appreciates his extreme neighborliness. That includes their new next-door neighbor Calvin Butler.

== Cast and characters ==
=== Main ===
- Cedric the Entertainer as Calvin Butler, who is a local homeowner; he is Tina's husband, Malcolm and Marty's father, and Daphne's grandfather. He owns an auto repair shop called Calvin's Pit Stop until selling it in season 5. In season 6, he and Marty open a repair shop called Fuse Box that specializes in electric vehicles.
- Max Greenfield as Dave Johnson, Gemma's husband and Grover's father. Dave is a friendly but awkward man who moves from Michigan to Pasadena, California. He is a professional conflict mediator, a military veteran, and a graduate of Western Michigan University in Kalamazoo, Michigan. In the season 8 premiere, he gets fired due to teaching AI to do his job resulting in him being rendered "redundant".
- Tichina Arnold as Tina Butler, Calvin's wife, Malcolm and Marty's mother, and Daphne's grandmother. A former singer in a semi-successful pop trio, she worked the front desk at Calvin's auto shop before starting her own cupcake business. In season 5, she accepts a part-time job as a music teacher at Gemma's school.
- Beth Behrs as Gemma Johnson, Dave's wife and Grover's mother. Her new job as principal at a private school in Los Angeles is the reason for the Johnson family moving to California. While it takes some time for Calvin to warm up to Dave, Gemma and Tina become fast friends.
- Sheaun McKinney as Malcolm Butler, Calvin and Tina's older son. He was once a professional baseball player working his way through the minor leagues until an injury ended his career. He had trouble finding steady employment until Marty got him a job as a security guard at JPL in season 2. In season 4, he is hired as the hitting coach for the USC baseball team. In the season 7 finale, he graduates from USC and moves to Venice Beach to become a writer. In season 8, he starts ghostwriting for a famous "real housewife" named Mercedes Selznick and the two begin a romantic relationship.
- Marcel Spears as Marty Butler, Calvin and Tina's younger son. He is a successful engineer at JPL with several nerdy hobbies and interests. Chronically unlucky in love, Marty meets a boxer named Necie in season 4 and gets engaged to her, only to have the engagement end in season 5. In season 6, he and Calvin open a repair shop called Fuse Box that specializes in electric vehicles. Marty has a one-night stand with Fuse Box employee Courtney that results in her getting pregnant. Their daughter Daphne is born in the season 6 finale. As of the season 7 finale, Marty and Courtney are now in a romantic relationship. They get engaged in season 8.
- Hank Greenspan as Grover Johnson, Dave and Gemma's son who is initially an elementary school student at Walcott Academy. In season 5, he begins middle school and turns 13 later on. In the season 7 finale, he graduates from Walcott and starts high school in the season 8 premiere.
- Skye Townsend as Courtney Pridgeon (season 7–8; recurring season 6), Marty's friend and former coworker who becomes pregnant by him after a one-night stand; she gives birth to Daphne in the season 6 finale. As of the season 7 finale, Marty and Courtney are now in a romantic relationship. They get engaged in season 8.

=== Recurring ===
- Malik S. as Trey, Malcolm's friend; it is later revealed that his real name is Leslie
- Earthquake as Que, the owner of the barbershop that Calvin and Dave frequent
- Gary Anthony Williams as Ernie (seasons 1–5), an old friend of Calvin's who runs a neighborhood bar
- Sloan Robinson as Old Miss Kim (seasons 1–4, 6–7), a grumpy neighbor who enjoys the company of younger men
  - Robinson also plays Kim's identical twin sister Florence.
- Sean Larkins as Randall (seasons 3–4; guest seasons 2, 6), the mailman
- Chelsea Harris as Necie (seasons 4–5) a female boxer and Marty's girlfriend, later ex-fiancé
- Kevin Pollak as Lamar (seasons 5–7), Dave's father with a criminal past who left him at a young age
- Amber Stevens West as Mercedes (season 8), a reality star on the fictional Trophy Divas of Brentwood series who becomes involved with Malcolm

=== Guest ===
- Marilu Henner as Paula (seasons 1, 7–8), Dave's mother
- Tracy Morgan as
  - Curtis (season 4), Calvin's brother
  - Francois "Crutch" Crutchfield (season 8), Calvin's cousin
- Patti LaBelle as Marilyn (season 4), Calvin's mother
- Glynn Turman as Otis (season 7), Tina's father
- Jackée Harry as Loretta (season 7), Tina's stepmother
- Erinn Hayes as Clara (season 7), the head of a preschool that Marty and Courtney look into for Daphne
- Garrett Morris as Jasper (season 7), Morris worked with Behrs on 2 Broke Girls (2011–17).
- Justin Long as Bruce (season 7), Malcolm's new neighbor in Venice
- Anthony Anderson as Clancy (season 8), Courtney's father

== Episodes ==
| Season | Episodes | Originally released | |
| Season | Episodes | First released | Last released |
|---|---|---|---|
| 1 | 21 | October 1, 2018 | April 22, 2019 |
| 2 | 22 | September 23, 2019 | May 4, 2020 |
| 3 | 18 | November 16, 2020 | May 17, 2021 |
| 4 | 22 | September 20, 2021 | May 23, 2022 |
| 5 | 22 | September 19, 2022 | May 22, 2023 |
| 6 | 10 | February 12, 2024 | May 6, 2024 |
| 7 | 20 | October 21, 2024 | May 5, 2025 |
| 8 | 20 | October 13, 2025 | May 11, 2026 |

== Production ==
=== Development ===
On September 27, 2017, it was announced that CBS had given the production, then titled Here Comes the Neighborhood, a pilot production commitment. The pilot was written by Jim Reynolds who was also set to executive produce alongside Aaron Kaplan, Dana Honor, and Wendi Trilling. Production companies involved with the pilot include Kapital Entertainment, CBS Television Studios, and Trill Television. On January 27, 2018, the production officially received a pilot order. On February 9, 2018, it was announced that James Burrows would direct the pilot.

Showrunners throughout the series' run
| Season | Showrunners |
|---|---|
| 1–3 | Jim Reynolds |
| 4 | Meg DeLoatch |
| 5–8 | Bill Martin and Mike Schiff |

On May 9, 2018, it was announced that CBS had given the production, now titled Welcome to the Neighborhood, a series order. A few days later, it was announced that the title of the show had been changed to The Neighborhood. A day after that, it was announced that the series would premiere in the fall of 2018 and air on Mondays at 8:00 P.M. On July 9, 2018, it was announced that the series would premiere on October 1, 2018. On October 19, 2018, it was announced that CBS had ordered an additional eight episodes of the series, bringing the first season total up to twenty-one episodes. On January 25, 2019, CBS renewed the series for a second season and premiered on September 23, 2019. On May 6, 2020, CBS renewed the series for a third season, which premiered on November 16, 2020. On February 17, 2021, CBS renewed the series for a fourth season. On April 5, 2021, Reynolds stepped down as the showrunner and executive producer after three seasons. On June 7, 2021, Meg DeLoatch joined the series as an executive producer and showrunner for the fourth season to replace Reynolds. The fourth season premiered on September 20, 2021. On January 24, 2022, CBS renewed the series for a fifth season. On March 26, 2022, DeLoatch exited as the showrunner. On June 8, 2022, Bill Martin and Mike Schiff were announced as the new showrunners of the series. The fifth season premiered on September 19, 2022. On January 23, 2023, CBS renewed the series for a sixth season. The sixth season premiered on February 12, 2024. On April 9, 2024, CBS renewed the series for a seventh season. The seventh season premiered on October 21, 2024. In March 2025, CBS renewed the series for an eighth and final season, which premiered on October 13, 2025.

=== Casting ===
In March 2018, it was announced that Sheaun McKinney, Marcel Spears, Cedric the Entertainer, Josh Lawson, Tichina Arnold had joined the pilot's main cast. On April 4, 2018, it was reported that Dreama Walker had joined the cast in a main role. On May 15, 2018, it was announced that Max Greenfield had replaced Lawson in the role of Dave Johnson. On June 11, 2018, it was announced that Beth Behrs had replaced Walker in the role of Gemma Johnson. On October 11, 2018, it was reported that Marilu Henner had been cast in a guest starring role. On December 10, 2018, it was announced that Marla Gibbs would make a guest appearance in the series.

=== Filming ===
The Neighborhood was filmed at Radford Studio Center in Studio City, California, but is set in Pasadena, California.

== Release ==
=== Marketing ===
On May 16, 2018, CBS released the first official trailer for the series. On July 11, 2018, a short promo video for the series was released, showcasing the addition of Greenfield and Behrs, with newly filmed footage from the re-shot pilot episode. Two days later, a new full length trailer featuring Greenfield and Behrs was released.

=== Premiere ===
On September 12, 2018, the series took part in the 12th Annual PaleyFest Fall Television Previews which featured a preview screening of the series and a conversation with cast members including Cedric the Entertainer, Tichina Arnold, Max Greenfield, and Beth Behrs.

== Reception ==
=== Critical response ===
The series has been met with a mixed-to-negative response from critics upon its premiere, often citing bad character writing and mishandling of the current social environment as the main factors. On the review aggregation website Rotten Tomatoes, the first season holds an approval rating of 24%, with an average rating of 4.3/10 and based on 17 reviews. The website's critical consensus reads: "While the show's likable cast has potential, poor attempts at cultural commentary and weak characterizations leave The Neighborhood stuck in a creative dead end." Metacritic, which uses a weighted average, assigned the season a score of 50 out of 100 based on 8 critics, indicating "mixed or average reviews".

=== Ratings ===
Viewership and ratings per season of The Neighborhood
| Season | Timeslot (ET) | Episodes | First aired | | Last aired | | TV season | Viewership rank | Avg. viewers (millions) |
| Season | Timeslot (ET) | Episodes | Date | Viewers (millions) | Date | Viewers (millions) | TV season | Viewership rank | Avg. viewers (millions) |
|---|---|---|---|---|---|---|---|---|---|
| 1 | Monday 8:00 pm | 21 | October 1, 2018 | 8.10 | April 22, 2019 | 6.27 | 2018–19 | 46 | 7.99 |
| 2 | Monday 8:00 pm | 22 | September 23, 2019 | 5.70 | May 4, 2020 | 6.55 | 2019–20 | 39 | 7.69 |
| 3 | Monday 8:00 pm | 18 | November 16, 2020 | 5.79 | May 17, 2021 | 5.56 | 2020–21 | 35 | 6.76 |
| 4 | Monday 8:00 pm | 22 | September 20, 2021 | 5.28 | May 23, 2022 | 5.91 | 2021–22 | 31 | 6.73 |
| 5 | Monday 8:00 pm | 22 | September 19, 2022 | 4.76 | May 22, 2023 | 5.22 | 2022–23 | 26 | 6.45 |
| 6 | Monday 8:00 pm | 10 | February 12, 2024 | 5.79 | May 6, 2024 | 4.99 | 2023–24 | 35 | 5.67 |
| 7 | Monday 8:00 pm | 20 | October 21, 2024 | 4.43 | May 5, 2025 | 4.14 | 2024–25 | TBD | TBD |
| 8 | Monday 8:00 pm (1–6, 9–20); Monday 8:30 pm (7–8) | 20 | October 13, 2025 | 3.85 | May 11, 2026 | TBD | 2025–26 | TBD | TBD |

== Home media ==
CBS Home Entertainment released the complete first season on DVD on August 4, 2020. The second season was released on December 1, 2020. The third season was released on July 27, 2021. The fourth season was released on July 19, 2022. The fifth season was released on July 25, 2023.

== Other appearances ==
Calvin (Cedric the Entertainer) and Tina (Tichina Arnold) appeared in the Bob Hearts Abishola season 3 episode "Compress to Impress", which aired on March 14, 2022.

== Crutch spin-off ==
On May 6, 2024, it was reported that a spin-off of The Neighborhood had been picked up by Paramount+ with the title Crutch, introducing Tracy Morgan as the new character of Francois "Crutch" Crutchfield, Calvin's cousin. All eight episodes of the series were released on November 3, 2025. In July 2026, Paramount+ canceled the series after one season.

== Failed Malcolm and Marty spin-off ==
On January 17, 2025, it was announced that a second spin-off focused on Malcolm and Marty with McKinney and Spears reprising their roles was in the works. In April 2025, it was reported that the spin-off would not be moving forward at CBS. The Season 7 finale was intended as a possible backdoor pilot for the series, showing the brothers as they move from Pasadena to Venice.
