= Sheaun McKinney =

American actor

- Born: July 24, 1981 (age 44); Miami, Florida, U.S.
- Occupation: Actor
- Years active: 2004–present

Sheaun McKinney (born July 24, 1981) is an American actor. He first gained prominence for his main role as Dayshawn on the HBO dark comedy television series Vice Principals (2016–2017). McKinney later had a recurring role as Wayne on the NBC sitcom Great News (2017–2018).

McKinney had his breakout with a main role as Malcolm Butler on the CBS sitcom The Neighborhood (2018–2026). Following his breakout, he had supporting roles in the films Boss Level (2020) and Bitch Ass (2022).

== Career ==
McKinney's first notable role was as Eddie on season 1 of the USA Network television series Graceland (2013). He gained recognition for his main role as Dayshawn on the HBO dark comedy series Vice Principals (2016–2017). In August 2016, McKinney was cast in a recurring role on the NBC sitcom Great News (2017–2018). In March 2017, he was cast in a co-leading role in a television pilot written by Jenny Lumet; however, the untitled pilot was not picked up to series.

In March 2018, McKinney was cast in a main role as Malcolm Butler in the CBS television pilot Welcome to the Neighborhood. The pilot was later picked up to series and was retitled to The Neighborhood. McKinney starred on the show for all of its eight seasons. In January 2025, a spinoff with McKinney's character as a co-lead was in development at CBS. In April, the spinoff was canceled.

== Filmography ==
=== Film ===
Year	Title	Role	Notes
2004	The Bahama Hustle	Cool-breeze	
2009	Know Thy Enemy	Nate Harris / Nemesis	
2010	Mega Shark Versus Crocosauras	USS Carter Sonar Tech	
2012	Air Collision	Navy SEAL #1	
2013	Hollywont	Punk 2	
2018	Halfway There	Derek Horn	Television film
2020	Boss Level	Dave	
2022	Bitch Ass	Spade	

=== Television ===
Year	Title	Role	Notes
2007	Burn Notice	Camaro Owner	Episode: "Pilot"
2010; 2013	Make It Happen	Larry Crawford	4 episodes; also producer and writer
2012	Common Law	Officer Dunsmore	Episode: "Role Play"
2013	Graceland	Eddie	3 episodes
2016–2017	Vice Principals	Dayshawn	15 episodes
2017–2018	Great News	Wayne	15 episodes
2017; 2019	Snowfall	Karvel	3 episodes
2018	Lethal Weapon	Booker	Episode: "Ruthless"
2018	Life in Pieces	Erikson	Episode: "Renter Portrait Plagiarism Scam"
2018	Door No. 1	Ryan	Episode: "Ten Year"
2018	Drunk History	Martin Luther King Jr. / Lewis Swegles	2 episodes
2018–2026	The Neighborhood	Malcolm Butler	155 episodes
2018	Room 104	Charles	Episode: "Artificial"
2022	Winning Time: The Rise of the Lakers Dynasty	Zastro	Episode: "The Best Is Yet to Come"
