= Bitch Ass =

2022 American film by Bill Posley

- Official release poster
- Directed by: Bill Posley
- Written by: Jonathan Colomb; Bill Posley
- Starring: Teon Kelley; Me'lisa Sellers; Tunde Laleye; Sheaun McKinney; A-F-R-O; Tony Todd
- Cinematography: Steven Parker
- Music by: Joseph Mohan
- Production company: Zebra Kidd Productions
- Distributed by: Quiver Distribution
- Release dates: March 14, 2022 (SXSW); October 14, 2022 (United States)
- Running time: 83 minutes
- Country: United States
- Language: English

Bitch Ass is a 2022 American crime horror film directed by Bill Posley and starring Tony Todd. It is Posley's feature directorial debut.

== Plot ==
The film opens with a framing device, where Tony Todd introduces the movie, claiming it to have been previously lost media and praising the titular character's place in Black horror as the first masked black serial killer.

Cecil is a young boy who lives with his abusive, religious grandmother during the 1970s. His sole joys are boardgames and the local beauty Marsia. This leads him to get bullied by some of the other kids, particularly as Spade is dating Marsia. The bullies call him "bitch ass" and eventually Spade goads the others into committing a brutal assault on Cecil that involves slicing off parts of his face.

Approximately 20 years later, Cecil's grandmother has died. Spade, has grown to be a small-time thug with a gang made up of local kids. When he learns of her death he decides to task them with robbing the place, as he believed it to have been empty. Among these kids is Marsia's son Q, who she wants to gain a better life by attending college.

Shortly after breaking into the house they discover that it has been set up with various tricks and traps that mimic popular board games like Jenga and Operation. They learn that all of these games were set up by "Bitch Ass", who is revealed to be the alter ego of Cecil, whose mind is now broken due to years of abuse. Bitch Ass picks them off one by one, only sparing Q because the boy empathized with him. Marsia and Spade arrive and are also captured. Bitch Ass forces Spade to play him in a deadly game of Battleship, during which Spade experiences genuine remorse for his past actions. Bitch Ass then forces Spade to wear a gas mask filled with poisonous gas.

It is revealed that Cecil's grandmother is not dead and has been monitoring Q. Marsia is brought to Q, causing the boy to realize that he must challenge Bitch Ass to another game if he and his mother are to survive. He and the killer play rock, paper, scissors, where each brutalizes their hand if they lose. Eventually this causes Marsia to snap and she attacks the grandmother. This distracts Bitch Ass, allowing Marsia to overpower him and escape with her son. The two return home, believing that they are safe. She soon discovers that this is not the case and that Bitch Ass will come for her, as he had left a Rubik's cube on her desk.

== Cast ==
- Teon Kelley as Quentin
- Me'lisa Sellers as Marsia Gatson
- Tunde Laleye as Bitch Ass
- Tony Todd as Titus
- Sheaun McKinney as Spade
- A-F-R-O as Moo
- Kelsey Caesar as Tuck
- Belle Guillory as Cricket
- Jarvis Denman Jr. as Young Cecil
- Tim J. Smith as Bootzs
- Sherri L. Walker-Meriwether as Grandma

== Production ==
According to Posley, Clarence Williams III was considered for the role portrayed by Todd.

== Release ==
The film premiered on March 14, 2022, at South by Southwest. The film was also shown at the Chattanooga Film Festival in June 2022.

It was announced in June 2022, that Quiver Distribution acquired North American rights to the film, which was released on October 14, 2022.

== Reception ==
On the review aggregator website Rotten Tomatoes, 65% of 26 critics' reviews are positive, with an average rating of 5.60/10. The website's consensus reads: "It's more entertaining in theory than execution, but if you're looking for an amusingly cheesy slasher, Bitch Ass should just about fit the bill."

Carlos Aguilar of IndieWire graded the film a B− and wrote, "Invoking an oft-overlooked canon, actor turned director Bill Posley fabricates a highly entertaining homage to the Black horror of decades past with Bitch Ass..."

Valerie Complex of Deadline Hollywood gave the film a positive review, calling it "a funny, charming piece of B-horror cinema that has what it takes to stand firm among the many B-movie cult classics."

Nick Allen of RogerEbert.com gave the film a negative review and wrote, "There's just not enough imagination or tact to make this all unsettling or fun, even though a serial killer named Bitch Ass is a good hook."

Meagan Navarro of Bloody Disgusting and Mary Beth McAndrews of Dread Central both awarded the film a three out of five score.

== See also ==
- List of hood films
