= Kapital Entertainment =

American entertainment company

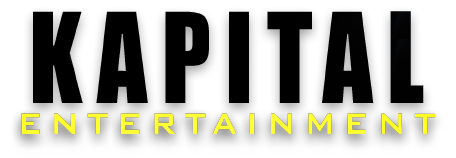
- Type: Private
- Industry: Entertainment
- Founded: 2009; 17 years ago
- Founder: Aaron Kaplan
- Headquarters: West Hollywood, California, U.S.
- Key people: Aaron Kaplan
- Services: Film and television production
- Owner: Aaron Kaplan
- Website: kapitalentertainment.com

Kapital Entertainment is an American entertainment company founded by Aaron Kaplan in 2009. Prior to founding Kapital, Kaplan was the worldwide head of scripted television at William Morris Agency, which he joined in 1991. He exited the company in 2009 when WMA was going through the regulatory process to finalize their merger with Endeavor to form WME Entertainment.

Kapital has since produced shows for many different networks such as CBS, Netflix, Amazon, Showtime, MTV, ABC, NBC, Fox, and HBO. Some of the company's productions including, Terra Nova, Life in Pieces, The Mysteries of Laura, American Housewife, The Chi, Fam, and Santa Clarita Diet.

Kapital also has two pod deals, one in 2014 with development executive Tracy Katsky via KatCo, which produces Santa Clarita Diet and another in 2016 with former longtime head of comedy at CBS Wendi Trilling to launch TrillTV. Both pods are based at Kapital's offices in West Hollywood.

On February 10, 2017, Kapital formed a joint venture with CBS Corporation and acquired a 50% ownership stake. CBS will also provide Co-financing for Kapital projects and will serve as worldwide distributor. However, Kapital will continue to operate as it had previously as an independent production company that is completely separate from CBS Television Studios (later CBS Studios) and CBS Television Network and it will have no first-look or any other agreements with either of them. In 2019, CBS Corporation merged with Viacom to form ViacomCBS (later Paramount Global and currently Paramount Skydance Corporation).

== Filmography ==
=== Television ===
Title	Network	Year	Notes
Terra Nova	Fox	2011	Co-produced with Chernin Entertainment, Amblin Television, Siesta Productions and 20th Television
The Inbetweeners	MTV	2012	Co-produced with Bwark Productions, Brad Copeland Productions and MTV Production Development
GCB	ABC	2012	Co-produced with Darren Star Productions and ABC Signature
The Neighbors	ABC	2012–2014	Co-produced with 17–28 Black and ABC Signature
Wendell & Vinnie	Nickelodeon	2013	Co-produced with Passable Entertainment and Nickelodeon Productions
Instant Mom	Nickelodeon	2013–2015	Co-produced with Stockholm Syndrome and Nickelodeon Productions
Back in the Game	ABC	2013	Co-produced with Cullen Bros. Television and 20th Television
Friends with Better Lives	CBS	2014	Co-produced with Liscolade Productions, Hemingson Entertainment and 20th Television
Chasing Life	ABC Family	2014–2015	Co-produced with Televisa and Lionsgate Television
The Mysteries of Laura	NBC	2014–2016	Co-produced with Berlanti Productions, Jeff Rake Productions, New Media Vision and Warner Bros. Television
Secrets and Lies	ABC	2015–2016	Co-produced with Hoodlum Entertainment and ABC Signature
Kevin from Work	ABC Family	2015	Co-produced with Wonderland Sound and Vision and 40 or 50 Years Productions
Life in Pieces	CBS	2015–2019	Co-produced with 40 or 50 Years Productions and 20th Television
Divorce	HBO	2016–2019	Co-produced with Pretty Matches Productions, Merman Films and 343 Incorporated
American Housewife	ABC	2016–2021	Co-produced with Eight Sisters Productions, Weiner & Schwartz and ABC Signature
Santa Clarita Diet	Netflix	2017–2019	Co-produced with Garfield Grove, KatCo, Flower Films, and Olybomb Productions
Me, Myself & I	CBS	2017–2018	Co-produced with Warner Bros. Television and Melon Entertainment
9JKL	CBS	2017–2018	Co-produced with CBS Television Studios, Liscolaide Productions and Trill TV
The Chi	Showtime	2018–2026	Co-produced with 20th Television, and Showtime Networks
A Million Little Things	ABC	2018–2023	Co-produced with ABC Signature
The Neighborhood	CBS	2018–2026	Co-produced with Trill TV, A Bird and a Bear Productions, Mud, Blood & Beer Productions and CBS Studios
Tell Me a Story	CBS All Access	2018–2020	Co-produced with Outerbanks Entertainment
Fam	CBS	2019	Co-produced with Kushellivision, Trill TV and CBS Studios
Delhi Crime	Netflix	2019–2022	Uncredited; co-produced with Golden Karavan, Ivanhoe Productions, FilmKaravan and Poor Man's Productions
Carol's Second Act	CBS	2019–2020	Co-produced with H+H, FourBoys Entertainment and CBS Studios
The Unicorn	CBS	2019–2021	Co-produced with Mike and Bill Productions, Trill TV and CBS Studios
Merry Happy Whatever	Netflix	2019	Co-produced with Trill TV and McMonkey Productions
HouseBroken	Fox	2021–2023	Co-produced with Fox Entertainment, Bento Box Entertainment, Merman, and AllenDen
American Auto	NBC	2021–2023	co-produced with Universal Television and Spitzer Holding Company
Women of the Movement	ABC	2022	co-produced with Two Drifters, Overbrook Entertainment, and Roc Nation
Let the World See	ABC	2022	co-produced with ABC News Studios, Roc Nation, Westbrook Studios, and Cobble Hill Films
Pivoting	Fox	2022	co-produced with Mama Look! Productions, Fox Entertainment and Warner Bros. Television Studios
Shining Vale	Starz	2022–2023	co-produced with Other Shoe Productions, Merman, Lionsgate Television and Warner Bros. Television Studios
Black Cake	Hulu	2023	co-produced with Harpo Films, ABC Signature and Two Drifters
Civil Justice with Sean Collinson	The CW	2024	co-produced with Paramount Global Content Distribution
Watson	CBS	2025–2026	co-produced with Action This Day! and CBS Studios
DMV	CBS	2025–2026	co-produced with Liscolaide Productions, OAOA, Anonymous Content, TrillTV, and CBS Studios
Crutch	Paramount+	2025	co-produced with Light Shine Productions, Streetlife Productions, A Bird and a Bear Entertainment, Trill TV, and CBS Studios
Real Kashmir Football Club	SonyLIV	2025–present	co-produced with Jaya Entertainment, Oshun Entertainment, and SK Global Entertainment

=== Film ===
Release date	Title	Directors	Production partners	Distributors
February 20, 2026	One Mile	Adam Davidson	Nomadic Pictures	Republic Pictures
