= List of The Neighborhood episodes =

The Neighborhood is an American sitcom television series created by Jim Reynolds that premiered on CBS on October 1, 2018. In January 2019, CBS announced it had renewed the series for a second season, which premiered on September 23, 2019. In May 2020, the series was renewed for a third season which premiered on November 16, 2020. In February 2021, the series was renewed for a fourth season which premiered on September 20, 2021. In January 2022, CBS renewed the series for a fifth season which premiered on September 19, 2022. In January 2023, CBS renewed the series for a sixth season which premiered on February 12, 2024. In April 2024, CBS renewed the series for a seventh season which premiered on October 21, 2024. In March 2025, CBS renewed the series for an eighth and final season which premiered on October 13, 2025.

During the course of the series, 155 episodes of The Neighborhood aired over eight seasons, between October 1, 2018, and May 11, 2026.

== Series overview ==
Season	Episodes	Originally released	
Season	Episodes	First released	Last released
1	21	October 1, 2018	April 22, 2019
2	22	September 23, 2019	May 4, 2020
3	18	November 16, 2020	May 17, 2021
4	22	September 20, 2021	May 23, 2022
5	22	September 19, 2022	May 22, 2023
6	10	February 12, 2024	May 6, 2024
7	20	October 21, 2024	May 5, 2025
8	20	October 13, 2025	May 11, 2026

== Episodes ==
=== Season 1 (2018–19) ===
No. overall	No. in season	Title	Directed by	Written by	Original release date	U.S. viewers (millions)
1	1	"Pilot"	James Burrows	Jim Reynolds	October 1, 2018	8.10
When white couple Dave and Gemma Johnson and their son, Grover, relocate from Michigan to Pasadena, California for Gemma's new job at a school, they find that the only house they can afford is in a working-class, mostly minority neighborhood. While neighbors Tina, Malcolm and Marty Butler welcome the new arrivals, homeowner Calvin Butler is not as inviting.
2	2	"Welcome to the Repipe"	Mark Cendrowski	Erica Montolfo-Bura	October 8, 2018	6.43
After a pipe bursts in the Johnson home, Malcolm convinces his reluctant father to lend a helping hand. Meanwhile, Gemma learns a little secret about Tina.
3	3	"Welcome to the Spare Key"	Jeff Greenstein	Devon Shepard	October 15, 2018	6.33
Dave gives a spare key for his home to Calvin, and is then upset when a month passes and Calvin hasn't given him a key. To appease Dave, Calvin gives him a key to a storage unit and says it's for the house, which later backfires when Tina locks Calvin out of the home.
4	4	"Welcome to the Housewarming"	Ken Whittingham	Ryan Raddatz	October 22, 2018	6.37
Dave and Gemma are throwing a housewarming party, but Calvin says he'd rather attend his monthly darts night at the local bar. The party attendance turns out to be disappointing, so Dave asks for Malcolm's and Marty's help to get the neighborhood more interested.
5	5	"Welcome to Game Night"	Victor Gonzalez	Laura Moran	October 29, 2018	6.10
Dave's idea for a game night with the Butlers goes south when it causes even more friction between Calvin and Malcolm, while forcing Gemma to admit in front of Grover that she stole a backpack when she was a teenager. Soon after, Calvin and Malcolm get to the root of their issues and Gemma witnesses racial profiling when she and Tina visit the department store to try and return the backpack.
6	6	"Welcome to the Anniversary"	Victor Gonzalez	Ryan Noggle	November 5, 2018	5.70
With Gemma working overtime, Dave asks Calvin if he and the Butlers can watch Grover for a night so he can take out his wife for their anniversary and reconnect romantically. While Grover becomes a handful for Calvin and Tina, Dave and Gemma get stuck in a hotel elevator.
7	7	"Welcome to the Barbershop"	Victor Gonzalez	Malik S.	November 12, 2018	6.14
Calvin is taken aback when Dave infiltrates his all-black barbershop, and becomes even more irritated when the guys at the shop actually like Dave's humor and insight. When Dave's advice backfires with one of the patrons, Calvin scolds him for it. Later, Dave confides to Calvin that he just misses having guy friends after leaving his "Zoo Crew" behind in Kalamazoo, Michigan.
8	8	"Welcome to Thanksgiving"	Stan Lathan	Isabelle Esposito	November 19, 2018	6.47
After inviting the Butlers to Thanksgiving dinner, Dave soon wants to take back the invitation when he learns his mother, Paula (Marilu Henner), is visiting. Sure enough, Paula's stereotypical views of African Americans embarrasses Dave, to the point where he scolds her. In a surprising twist, Calvin tells Dave he needs to appreciate his mother while she's still around.
9	9	"Welcome to the Dinner Guest"	Stan Lathan	Tracey Ashley	December 3, 2018	6.50
Despite fears that Calvin will disapprove, Marty decides to introduce his white girlfriend Chloe to his family. Calvin soon warms up to Chloe when she says her father has season tickets for the Los Angeles Dodgers, only to have Tina strongly disapprove when she learns that Chloe is an atheist.
10	10	"Welcome to the Stolen Sneakers"	Mark Cendrowski	Bill Posley	December 10, 2018	6.07
After Malcolm is mugged and has his shoes stolen, Calvin, Dave and Tina have differing views on how to combat crime in the neighborhood. The two families are taken aback when they see how young the assailant is.
11	11	"Welcome to the Fundraiser"	Victor Gonzalez	Teleplay by : Lanie Siegel & Ben Slaughter; Story by : Sean Larkins	December 17, 2018	6.08
Tina and Calvin accompany Gemma and Dave to a fundraiser being held at Gemma's school. Gemma becomes embarrassed over the lack of progress she is making in diversity enrollments, so Tina and Calvin try to help by pretending to have a son they are interested in sending. Meanwhile, Malcolm and Marty are watching Grover, and try to get him to do something other than play on his iPad.
12	12	"Welcome to Grover's Birthday"	Victor Gonzalez	Michael Glouberman	January 14, 2019	6.82
Malcolm and Marty try to rescue Grover's birthday party from the unsatisfactory events that Dave and Gemma planned, but the brothers get distracted by their need to compete. Meanwhile, Dave and Gemma are a bit shocked when Grover opens his gift from Calvin.
13	13	"Welcome to Fight Night"	Phill Lewis	Jim Reynolds	February 4, 2019	7.53
Malcolm convinces a reluctant Calvin to invite Dave over to watch a pay-per-view boxing match while the ladies are on a trip to Las Vegas. Dave volunteers to cut a tree branch that is interfering with Calvin's dish reception, but falls off the roof onto Calvin, injuring him. In Vegas, Tina and Gemma have different ideas on how to have the most fun possible during their stay.
14	14	"Welcome to the Yard Sale"	Betsy Thomas	Arthur Harris	February 11, 2019	7.04
Dave convinces Calvin to have a yard sale, wherein the latter unknowingly sells a valuable porcelain angel for a dollar to an elderly woman in the neighborhood (Marla Gibbs). When Calvin learns the object's value, he and Dave scheme to get it back.
15	15	"Welcome to Malcolm's Job"	Mark Cendrowski	Erica Montolfo-Bura	February 18, 2019	6.45
Malcolm gets a job selling televisions at an electronics store, making Calvin proud. However, Malcolm quits after one day when his boss forces him to lie to customers, causing him to then avoid telling Calvin that he's unemployed. Elsewhere, Gemma hires Tina as Grover's new piano teacher after Grover seems uninspired to practice, but Tina quickly learns that the previous instructor was not the problem.
16	16	"Welcome to the Big Payback"	Anthony Rich	Michael Glouberman	February 25, 2019	7.06
Calvin does a $300 brake job for Gemma at his auto shop, but Tina, without Calvin's approval, tells Gemma she doesn't have to pay. Dave wants to pay Calvin, but Gemma insists it will be insulting to Tina if he does. Dave then secretly pays Calvin the money, but worries because he's terrible at keeping secrets from Gemma. Elsewhere, Malcolm and Marty try a new dating app, and both end up dating the same woman.
17	17	"Welcome to the Climb"	Mark Cendrowski	Ryan Raddatz	March 11, 2019	6.43
Gemma is forced to fire a perpetually absent gym teacher, and on the way out, he tells her the only reason she was hired is because she's a woman. As she starts to believe the teacher may be right, Dave becomes determined to show Gemma how strong and capable she is. Meanwhile, Calvin has trouble expressing anger with his lackadaisical paperboy after learning it's really a papergirl.
18	18	"Welcome to Logan #2"	Mark Cendrowski	Malik S.	March 25, 2019	6.34
When the basketball team from Dave's alma mater, Western Michigan, makes the NCAA Sweet 16 against Calvin's favored USC team, Dave scores tickets to the game and invites a member of his Zoo Crew named Logan (Geoff Stults). After Calvin learns that Dave was a cheerleader in college, and teases him mercilessly for it, he also learns from Logan that Dave is a veteran who did a tour in Iraq. Calvin's anger during the game grows and it culminates in a fistfight between him and Buster Bronco. In a jail cell, Calvin confides that he was mad with Dave due to not being told about his deployment. Meanwhile, Gemma learns about Tina's brief time as a singer.
19	19	"Welcome to the Camping Trip"	Victor Gonzalez	Laura Moran	April 1, 2019	6.14
Dave convinces the Butlers to join in on the Johnson family camping trip, but Calvin ruins Dave's plans by showing up in a rented RV. However, everyone is soon forced to join Dave (and later a bear) in the outdoors when the RV's septic system backs up.
20	20	"Welcome to the Repass"	Victor Gonzalez	Ryan Noggle	April 15, 2019	5.75
When an elderly neighbor known as "Mean Mr. Benson" passes away, Dave still wants to make sure he gets a proper ceremony. He convinces Calvin to hold a repass at the Butler home, wherein Calvin starts to realize he may have become the new Mean Mr. Benson in the eyes of the neighborhood kids. Meanwhile, when Grover asks questions about Mr. Benson's death, Gemma and Tina offer differing views of what heaven is.
21	21	"Welcome to the Conversation"	Jeff Greenstein	Jim Reynolds	April 22, 2019	6.27
Calvin has free passes for a round of golf at an upscale club, and takes Dave along to play with him. Though Dave initially refuses to see it, Calvin exposes him to the ways he's treated differently because of his skin color. At home, Gemma gets Tina, Marty and Malcolm involved in helping her show Grover that she can be as fun as Dave is.

=== Season 2 (2019–20) ===
No. overall	No. in season	Title	Directed by	Written by	Original release date	U.S. viewers (millions)
22	1	"Welcome to the Re-Rack"	Victor Gonzalez	Jim Reynolds	September 23, 2019	5.70
Calvin invites Dave to bring napkins and plates to his neighborhood "yard-e-cue", but Dave can't help cooking up a batch of his signature ribs to compete against Calvin's. Tina tries to convince Gemma that they can be honest when receiving a gift from the other that they don't like. Meanwhile, Malcolm and Marty give Grover advice about how to deal with a girl who likes him.
23	2	"Welcome to the Bully"	Mark Cendrowski	Erica Montolfo-Bura	September 30, 2019	5.87
After Grover retaliates against a bully at school named Justin and hurts the boy, Dave decides to go to Justin's house and have Grover apologize, only to be bullied himself by Justin's father, Ed. Upon learning that Dave also retaliated and beat up Ed, injuring his shoulder and causing him to need stitches, Gemma has to deal with the backlash at school. Meanwhile, Marty tells Calvin he is tired of being bullied and teased for his choice of hobbies, prompting Calvin to try a game of Dungeons & Dragons with Marty and Malcolm.
24	3	"Welcome to the Fresh Coat"	Victor Gonzalez	Michael Glouberman	October 7, 2019	5.58
Calvin is furious after Tina accepts Dave's offer to paint the Butler house for free, insisting it's a violation of the "man code" to make your neighbor look lazy. However, Dave won't take "no" for an answer, explaining that his man code says friends help friends.
25	4	"Welcome to Co-Habitation"	Mark Cendrowski	Brian Keith Etheridge	October 14, 2019	5.29
During a heat wave, Dave accidentally knocks out power to the Butler home with his drone, forcing Calvin and Tina to stay at the Johnson home to keep cool. While preparing to sleep that night, Calvin finds Dave's journal and reads an insulting entry about himself, causing a rift between the two. Meanwhile, Malcolm stays at Marty's apartment and pulls a prank by rearranging all of Marty's beloved collections, but Malcolm gets his comeuppance at work the next day.
26	5	"Welcome to Soul Food"	Mark Cendrowski	Laura Moran	October 21, 2019	5.67
The Butlers and Johnsons double date at a new soul food restaurant in town. Calvin is wowed by his meal, but wants to retract his praise when he learns that the head chef is white. Meanwhile, Grover has Malcolm and Marty as guests on his school podcast project, and asks some very personal questions.
27	6	"Welcome to the Wagon"	Phill Lewis	Ryan Raddatz	October 28, 2019	5.75
With REO Speedwagon in town for a concert, Calvin is delighted that Dave likes the band so that he can take Tina in Calvin's place. When someone mistakes Dave and Tina for a married couple at the show, Tina laughs and says that could never happen, hurting Dave's feelings. She tells him they are just too different, and she's not talking about color. At home, Calvin and Malcolm try to help Gemma rid her house of a wild parrot that flew in. Meanwhile, Marty scares Grover as they watch a meteor shower, saying that one could hit the earth at any time and cause a major catastrophe.
28	7	"Welcome to the Vow Renewal"	Jeff Greenstein	Malik S.	November 4, 2019	5.86
As their 30th anniversary approaches, Calvin and Tina decide to renew their vows, given that their original wedding was in a courthouse. Dave and Gemma are pleased to help plan the event, but things go awry when Calvin talks about needing to marry Tina when she got pregnant with Malcolm. Meanwhile, Malcolm and Marty plan to reprise the song they sang for their parents' 10th anniversary, but it becomes clear that Malcolm can't sing like he did pre-puberty.
29	8	"Welcome to Bowling"	Mark Cendrowski	Ryan Noggle	November 18, 2019	6.49
When his bowling partner is injured, Calvin is forced to enlist Dave for the upcoming championship match, which is against two women known as the Pink Ladies (Kym Whitley and Cocoa Brown). Dave turns out to be a good bowler, but Calvin struggles when the ladies, who know him from high school, constantly taunt him for a notorious goof he made on the football field. Meanwhile, Tina is none too happy when Gemma knocks off her high score on an arcade dance game. Also, Marty gives Malcolm some tips on investing the extra money he has from working a regular job.
30	9	"Welcome to the Dealbreaker"	Mark Cendrowski	Don D. Scott	November 25, 2019	5.92
Gemma sets up Malcolm with Sofia, a teacher from her school, on a blind date. While the two seem to hit it off, Malcolm tells Gemma that Sofia's annoying laugh is a deal-breaker and he declines a second date. After some coaxing, Gemma learns that Malcolm really likes Sofia, but feels she's out of his league due to his current career and living situation. Meanwhile, Marty helps Calvin and Tina prepare a will, but it leads to a heated discussion about seeing other people after one of them has passed.
31	10	"Welcome to the Digital Divide"	Marian Deaton	Isabelle Esposito	December 9, 2019	6.13
When Calvin's auto repair competitor runs a snappy ad and launches a cool website, Marty tries to get his reluctant father to bring his business into the digital age. Meanwhile, Dave tries to get Grover to reduce his iPad screen time, but finds it's more difficult than he thought.
32	11	"Welcome to the Scooter"	Ron Moseley	Tracey Ashley	December 16, 2019	6.45
After searching six stores, Dave is able to purchase a hard-to-find scooter for Grover's Christmas present, only to have the scooter stolen from his garage. Calvin suggests that his barbershop crew will likely know about any stolen items in the area. The two are led to a sketchy reseller of stolen goods, but he doesn't have the scooter. In the end, the barbershop crew finds the scooter and returns it to Dave, while Calvin has another surprise for his neighbor. Elsewhere, Tina is disappointed when Malcolm and Marty feel they are too old to partake in one of her Christmas traditions.
33	12	"Welcome to the Freeloader"	Mark Cendrowski	Lanie Siegel & Ben Slaughter	January 6, 2020	6.86
Dave rants to Calvin about Gemma's freeloading younger sister Brittany (Deborah Baker Jr.) coming to town, likely to ask for money and a place to stay. When Calvin realizes he's got a freeloader of his own in Malcolm, he decides to get tough with his eldest son, but it puts him at odds with Tina. Absent: Marcel Spears as Marty Butler
34	13	"Welcome to the New Pastor"	Mark Cendrowski	Michael Glouberman	January 20, 2020	6.81
Upon meeting Pastor Don (Victor Williams), Calvin is worried about him becoming too close to Tina, who is on the pastor selection committee. However, Calvin soon learns that Pastor Don has been seeing two other parish women, and calls him out on it. Elsewhere, Malcolm helps Marty get up the nerve to confront the loud upstairs neighbor who has just moved in, but to Marty's surprise, the neighbor is a cute young woman.
35	14	"Welcome to Trivia Night"	Mark Cendrowski	Jim Reynolds	February 3, 2020	6.22
Dave, Gemma, Calvin and Marty form a team for trivia night at Ernie's, but Dave and Calvin are embarrassed when Marty and Gemma come up with all the answers. Determined to prove they are just as smart, Dave and Calvin form a team to take on Marty and Gemma in a rematch with different categories. Meanwhile, Tina wonders aloud why Malcolm hasn't introduced her to Sofia yet, and becomes furious after learning that Malcolm has spent time with Sofia's parents more than once.
36	15	"Welcome to the Bad Review"	Victor Gonzalez	Erica Montolfo-Bura	February 10, 2020	6.40
After three of his mechanics quit, Calvin reluctantly agrees to let Dave use his conflict resolution skills to assess the attitude of the remaining employees. The reviews show the mechanics are actually dissatisfied with how Tina treats them, but all is not as it seems. Meanwhile, Marty tries to work up the courage to ask upstairs neighbor Kiera on a date.
37	16	"Welcome to the Hockey Game"	Mark Cendrowski	Ryan Raddatz	February 17, 2020	6.46
When Calvin starts sharing some of Dave's hobbies and using his catch phrases, Malcolm and Marty tease him about turning into his neighbor. Calvin decides to get back to his "roots", but the results are even more embarrassing. Elsewhere, Tina is mistaken for Mary J. Blige on her trip to a winery resort with Gemma, so the two decide to take advantage of the perks. However, things become stressful when the hotel manager asks "Mary" to sing a song for an ill guest.
38	17	"Welcome to the Commercial"	Kelly Park	Brian Keith Etheridge	March 9, 2020	6.23
After seeing his competitor's TV commercial, Calvin decides to make a commercial for Calvin's Pit Stop with help from Marty, Tina and Dave. Meanwhile, Malcolm feels pressure from Gemma to profess his love for Sofia, but Sofia's job offer from a school in France complicates things.
39	18	"Welcome to the Team"	Mark Cendrowski	Laura Moran	March 16, 2020	7.39
Grover joins the basketball team that Calvin coaches, but it quickly becomes clear that he has no basketball skills. To get Grover into the game, Calvin encourages him to commit hard fouls against opponents, much to the dismay of Dave and Gemma. Elsewhere, Marty learns that Tina purposely killed the pet snake he had as a teenager while saying it escaped, and he decides to use mom's guilt to his advantage.
40	19	"Welcome to the Jump"	Victor Gonzalez	Malik S.	April 6, 2020	7.23
When Tina announces she is starting menopause, Gemma convinces her to celebrate the new chapter in her life rather than being depressed, and suggests she go skydiving. Tina then convinces a reluctant Calvin to join her. Meanwhile, Marty helps Grover retool his class robot project with some components from JPL, but the result becomes a danger to both of them.
41	20	"Welcome to the Standoff"	Mark Cendrowski	Michael Glouberman	April 13, 2020	7.11
After Dave gets his family's stuffed moose head delivered from Michigan, Calvin sees him taking it out to the garage and questions if Dave gets to make any decisions in his house. Dave says he makes plenty of decisions, but soon realizes Gemma manipulates him into accepting all of her decisions. Dave rebels by mounting the moose head on the living room wall, but it doesn't end well for him. Meanwhile, Calvin tries to manipulate Tina into spending their tax refund on a massage chair instead of the vacation to Italy that she wants. It seems to work, but Tina is one step ahead of him.
42	21	"Welcome to the Speed Bump"	Mark Cendrowski	Ryan Noggle	May 4, 2020	6.74
Dave notices cars are starting to speed down his and Calvin's street after a GPS app recently made the neighborhood an alternate route to avoid traffic. He circulates a petition to get a speed bump installed, but is one signature short of the needed total. Dave enlists Calvin's help to get a signature from his neighbor Walter (Richard Gant), with whom he's had an ongoing feud regarding the location of Calvin's backyard fence. Elsewhere, Malcolm and Marty take Grover to an amusement park, but Grover is too short to ride the roller coaster. They instead take him on the Ferris wheel, wherein they get stuck high in the air when the ride breaks down.
43	22	"Welcome to the Campaign"	Mark Cendrowski	Don D. Scott	May 4, 2020	6.55
Having decided to run for City Council, Dave tries to get Calvin's endorsement, but Calvin feels Dave has no chance to beat the popular incumbent, Councilman Evans (Wayne Brady). Things get worse when Evans' campaign exposes a photo of Dave with a Confederate flag cake. Dave says the cake was for his 10th birthday party, which had a Dukes of Hazzard theme, and insists he had no idea back then what the flag represents. Knowing that Dave is not racist, Calvin speaks up for his friend in the community and gives him his endorsement.

=== Season 3 (2020–21) ===
No. overall	No. in season	Title	Directed by	Written by	Original release date	U.S. viewers (millions)
44	1	"Welcome to the Movement"	Mark Cendrowski	Jim Reynolds	November 16, 2020	5.79
After Malcolm's friend Trey is beaten by a police officer and arrested while he and Malcolm are just shooting hoops, Calvin and Dave try to bail out Trey but are unsuccessful. Malcolm joins a protest which seems to have no effect, so he and a few others want to take it to the next level and storm the police station. Calvin convinces his son to use his brains instead of violence. Meanwhile, Marty has a conversation with Grover, explaining that Grover's generation could be the one that ends systemic racism.
45	2	"Welcome to the Election"	Mark Cendrowski	Michael Glouberman	November 23, 2020	5.46
With election day for Pasadena District 3 City Council approaching, Dave is blindsided when incumbent Isaiah Evans tells him about a debate he scheduled that evening. With only six hours to prepare, Calvin convinces Dave to mix in some flash during the presentation of his ideas, only to have Evans steal the catchphrases Calvin thought up for Dave. Calvin and Dave do get a leg up on Evans at the debate by pressing him to share details of his catchphrases, which he can't do. Meanwhile, Grover, Marty and Malcolm make a viral video to get younger people to vote for Dave. Still, Dave loses the election in a very close race. Calvin consoles a dejected Dave by assuring him that while he lost, his ideas were heard.
46	3	"Welcome to Couples Therapy"	Ron Moseley	Brian Keith Etheridge	November 30, 2020	5.52
Calvin and Tina are surprised when Dave and Gemma reveal they occasionally go to couples therapy to keep their marriage strong. Tina convinces a reluctant Calvin that they should go see the Johnsons' therapist, Dr. Chen (Suzy Nakamura). Calvin's worst fears come true when Dr. Chen suggests he and Tina reconnect on a purely emotional level, which means abstaining from sex for 30 days. Later, Calvin learns that Dave secretly hates going to couples therapy, but only does it because Gemma seems to think it's necessary. Meanwhile, Marty uses Dr. Chen's book to get Malcolm to see how poorly he treats his younger sibling.
47	4	"Welcome to the Rooster"	Ron Moseley	Ryan Raddatz	December 7, 2020	5.27
Calvin and Dave meet new neighbor Wyatt, a self-proclaimed urban homesteader, as he is walking his pet rooster. After the rooster keeps them awake at all hours of the night, Calvin and Dave resolve to do something about it. However, when they capture the rooster, neither person has the stomach to do anything sinister. Meanwhile, after doing the laundry that Marty has been bringing home for years, Tina becomes furious when she discovers a perfectly good washer and dryer in his apartment. So, she pours wine on a valuable autographed Star Trek crew shirt he had. Marty explains that the reason he did laundry at their house rather than his was because he missed Tina.
48	5	"Welcome to the Road Trip"	Mark Cendrowski	Alyson Fouse	December 14, 2020	5.26
Dave convinces Calvin to take him along in his classic hot rod for a trip to a car show in Nevada. When Calvin pulls off the road to let Dave relieve himself, the car gets stuck in sand, forcing the two to hitch a ride to a service station with a creepy character. Meanwhile, Tina complains to Gemma about Calvin taking a road trip when there are so many home projects he's neglecting. Gemma assures Tina that they can install the curtains in the front windows, but the two only succeed in doing more damage.
49	6	"Welcome to the Turnaround"	Mark Cendrowski	Laura Moran	January 4, 2021	6.20
Dave and Gemma fear the worst when Gemma's sister Brittany returns to town, but Brittany surprisingly pays them back all the money she borrowed/stole from them in the past, and announces she's become successful marketing her self-designed fashions. Gemma decides to hold a fashion show for Brittany, inviting some women from the school while Tina invites some friends from church. However, Brittany's clothing line is not what they expected. Meanwhile, Dave convinces Calvin that they should spend some of Brittany's check on an escape room.
50	7	"Welcome to the Motorcycle"	Mark Cendrowski	Richard Brandon Manus	January 18, 2021	6.09
Malcolm goes out to buy a used car but returns home with a motorcycle. Calvin is thrilled, but Tina insists a motorcycle is unsafe and wants Malcolm to take it back. Calvin ultimately respects his wife's fears and takes drastic measures to prevent Malcolm from riding the bike. Meanwhile, Dave and Gemma feel like their life is becoming boring and predictable, so they take a spontaneous trip to Las Vegas for a night. However, their plans to tear up the town never come to fruition, as they fall asleep watching television in their hotel room. Absent: Marcel Spears as Marty Butler
51	8	"Welcome to the Property"	Betsy Thomas	Malik S.	January 25, 2021	6.41
Calvin worries what will happen to the neighborhood after his neighbor Walter announces he's selling his property to rich developers, who will likely tear down the house and put up a huge new one. He and Dave assure Walter that they can fix up the house and get him a better selling price, but when they get inside, it's much more of a project than they planned. When potential buyers do not bite, Calvin offers to buy the house for Malcolm and Marty, who agree to pay their father rent.
52	9	"Welcome to the Shakedown"	Mark Cendrowski	Ryan Noggle	February 8, 2021	6.06
After Gemma leaves her phone behind while shopping, Dave gets a call from a man named Stan who found the phone and now wants $300 to return it. Against Gemma's and Tina's wishes, Dave and Calvin arrange a meeting to confront Stan. Dave speaks to Stan first, and when Calvin does his "roll-up", Stan has a heart attack. Elsewhere, Malcolm and Marty argue over who should get the larger bedroom in their new house, until they realize the room is within earshot of their parents' bedroom.
53	10	"Welcome to the Procedure"	Ron Moseley	Don D. Scott	February 22, 2021	5.92
Calvin finally agrees to get a physical exam after not seeing a doctor in nine years. While his exam results are good, Calvin learns that he needs a colonoscopy because of his age. After fighting with Tina and Dave, Calvin finally relents and gets the procedure done. Meanwhile, Grover asks Malcolm to be his guest for career day at the school because he thinks his security guard job is cool, which irritates Marty. Marty upstages Malcolm at the school by wearing a spacesuit, later confiding that he wanted to return to the school and be the cool guy for once.
54	11	"Welcome to the Dad Band"	Leonard R. Garner Jr.	Tracey Ashley	March 8, 2021	5.61
Dave forms a band called "Dadditude" with three other fathers from Grover's school. When their singer suffers a throat problem, Dave asks Tina to fill in, but Tina's relentless pursuit of perfection takes the fun out of it. Calvin tells Dave the same thing happened when Tina joined the church choir. Rather than upset his friend by firing her, Dave tries to get Tina to quit. Meanwhile, Marty wants to ask for a raise at work, but it only leads to his over-friendly boss, Jerry (Samm Levine), asking to crash on Marty and Malcolm's couch.
55	12	"Welcome to the Treehouse"	Mark Cendrowski	Lanie Siegel	March 15, 2021	5.39
Dave enlists Calvin's help in building a treehouse for Grover, later soliciting Marty's engineering advice when he tells Dave about the dangerous tree house Calvin built for him and Malcolm years ago. However, Calvin does not want to listen to Marty, and the results are predictable. Elsewhere, Tina and Gemma are baking cookies for a charity event when Malcolm grabs a cookie. He innocently says it's the best cookie he's ever tasted, not knowing it's one of Gemma's. An angry Tina calls Gemma's cookie a "fluke" and challenges her friend to a bake-off, with Malcolm doing a blind taste test.
56	13	"Welcome to the Art Class"	Mark Cendrowski	Ben Slaughter	April 12, 2021	4.96
After deciding to stay home and watch blooper videos with Ernie instead of starting an art class with Tina and Gemma, Calvin is taken aback when he learns the girls' first art assignment involved a nude male model. Meanwhile, Marty finds Walter's murder mystery novel manuscript in the basement and shares it with Malcolm and Dave. When the last page is missing, the guys decide to track down Walter at his retirement home, only to be disappointed with Walter's identification of the murderer.
57	14	"Welcome to the Hero"	Mark Cendrowski	Gracie Glassmeyer & Lorraine DeGraffenreidt	April 19, 2021	5.11
Dave has to use the bathroom at the neighborhood barbershop just as they are closing and winds up thwarting a robbery as Calvin watches. The next day, the shop patrons call Dave a hero, which goes to his head. Ignoring Calvin's cautions, Dave accepts an invitation from Trey to attend his neighborhood poker and dice game. While there, Dave runs into the cousin of the man he put in jail, forcing Calvin to come to the rescue. Meanwhile, Gemma is shaken over Dave's close call with the robber and helps Marty with his garden as a way of calming down. However, she loses her wedding ring and ruins Marty's garden looking for it.
58	15	"Welcome to the Challenge"	Mark Cendrowski	Jim Reynolds	April 26, 2021	4.89
Irritated when rival auto shop owner Victor Alvarez (George Lopez) puts up a billboard next to Calvin's building, Calvin and Dave propose to get publicity by matching food donations to a local pantry with free oil changes. However, Alvarez shows up at the pantry and steals Calvin's thunder by donating $5,000. Calvin then issues a challenge for another $5,000 (which an over-eager Dave doubles to $10,000), where the loser of an engine rebuild contest must make the donation. Even though Alvarez steals Calvin's best mechanic, Calvin wins the challenge, when he realizes that Dave rambling on and on to him made him more focused. Meanwhile, Malcolm prods Marty into working out with him, only to injure himself, which he subsequently tries to hide from Marty.
59	16	"Welcome to the Test Run"	Mark Cendrowski	Michael Glouberman	May 3, 2021	5.31
After Gemma refuses to throw away Grover's baby things because she's thinking she might want another child, Dave tries to discourage his wife by bringing home a life-like robot baby to remind her how hard it is to care for an infant. However, when Gemma seems to be having no problem with the robot, Dave asks Marty to reprogram it to ramp up its loud and obnoxious qualities. Elsewhere, Calvin gives Tina a Bible he picked up at a salvage store, and they find several hundred dollars inside. Tina says it's a sign from God that they should return the money or donate it to charity, but Calvin wants to use it to buy a big-screen TV. When bad things start happening to him, Calvin begins to think Tina may be right.
60	17	"Welcome to the Invasion"	Mark Cendrowski	Ryan Raddatz & Alyson Fouse	May 10, 2021	5.11
Calvin is irritated when his high school nemeses, LaTonya and Regina, rent an open chair in his barbershop. Dave advises Calvin to try and make a peace offering, which Calvin does by offering the women free tune-ups at his shop. The women reciprocate by offering Calvin a free manicure and neck massage, but after he falls asleep in the chair, they play a prank on him. When the whole barbershop starts making fun of him, Calvin and Dave attempt to reveal a secret about Regina to try and cause a feud, but it fails. Calvin, fed up, confronts LaTonya and Regina and one by one, the barbershop patrons sympathize with Calvin. Que ultimately kicks the two women out. Meanwhile, Gemma's desire to have another child has Tina realizing that neither of her sons are close to giving her a grandchild. To figure out why Marty isn't getting any action on his dating app, the women create a fake profile so they can view what Marty is putting out there, but it backfires.
61	18	"Welcome to the Surprise"	Victor Gonzalez	Michael Glouberman & Brian Keith Etheridge	May 17, 2021	5.56
Calvin's mother sends him an unusual gift for his birthday: an urn with his father's ashes. When Dave hears how much the father loved fishing off the pier, he suggests that he and Calvin go there and take the urn with them. However, after Dave has an accident with the urn, Calvin begins to grate over his friend's frequent mishaps. Meanwhile, Tina, Gemma, Malcolm, Marty and Grover prepare a surprise party for Calvin, only for Gemma to learn she has a bigger surprise for Dave: she's pregnant.

=== Season 4 (2021–22) ===
No. overall	No. in season	Title	Directed by	Written by	Original release date	U.S. viewers (millions)
62	1	"Welcome to the Family"	Victor Gonzalez	Ralph Greene	September 20, 2021	5.28
Dave learns through a genealogy test that he has an African American sixth cousin, and soon after learns that the cousin is related to Calvin's family from back in the late 1800s. Worse, Dave finds out that his ancestors stole land from Calvin's, and he goes overboard trying to make amends. Meanwhile, Gemma is dealing with morning sickness and unable to successfully make cupcakes for Grover's cub scout meeting, requiring last-minute help from Tina.
63	2	"Welcome to the Intervention"	Victor Gonzalez	Sa'Rah L. Jones	September 27, 2021	5.41
After Calvin fails to help Victor, a young man he saw grow up in the neighborhood, with his addiction, Dave jumps in upon learning that Victor is a veteran who came back from Afghanistan a changed man. When Dave fails to get his fellow vet to go to a VA rehab he arranged, Calvin decides to give up on helping Victor. But with Tina's prodding, he gives it one more try. Meanwhile, Marty is determined to date Que's niece Keisha, whom he's always had a crush on, but has to radically change his persona upon learning that Keisha only dates "bad boys".
64	3	"Welcome to the Sister from Another Mister"	Victor Gonzalez	Malik S.	October 4, 2021	5.52
Gemma introduces the Butlers to her new "black" diversity hire, Alexis (Nicole Sullivan), who will be teaching African American studies at her school. Despite her knowledge of various African-American topics, Tina is convinced Alexis is white. When they decide to test her, they are convinced she's black. When Gemma and Tina take Alexis out for lunch, they are stopped by a officer who noticed that Gemma's plates were expired. However, Alexis decides to "intervene", having a Karen-like meltdown on the officer. Meanwhile, Calvin gets the mayor (Danny Woodburn) to agree on saving an old baseball field from being razed, as long as he, Malcolm, Marty, Dave and Grover can clean it up. Malcolm has a tough time with the memories from that field, given his failed dream of playing in the major leagues.
65	4	"Welcome to the Porch Pirate"	Victor Gonzalez	Meg DeLoatch	October 11, 2021	5.37
After Gemma has a miscarriage and loses her baby, she tries to stay busy to avoid dealing with the pain. Dave and the Butlers all show her love and support, but she initially brushes them off. However, when Calvin is too late trying to intercept a baby gift on the Johnsons' porch before Gemma sees it, she finally breaks down and cries in front of him. Meanwhile, Malcolm uses concealer to cover a pimple before a big date, and decides he wants to continue using male makeup while trying to hide it from his family.
66	5	"Welcome to Your Match"	Victor Gonzalez	Devanshi Patel	October 18, 2021	5.30
After learning that their neighbor Suraya is a professional matchmaker, Calvin and Tina enlist her help in finding a woman for Marty. However, Calvin, Tina and Malcolm ignore Suraya's advice, each thinking they have found Marty's perfect match. Meanwhile, between their busy schedules and babysitter cancellations, Dave and Gemma struggle to find time to reconnect.
67	6	"Welcome to the Haunting"	Victor Gonzalez	Jess Pineda	November 1, 2021	5.48
It takes most of the neighborhood and some help from Marty's co-workers at JPL, but Calvin, the "King of Halloween Pranks," finally gets a taste of his own medicine. Meanwhile, Gemma and Tina try to decide if they are too old to be wearing sexy Halloween costumes.
68	7	"Welcome to the Ex-Files"	Leonard R. Garner Jr.	Terrell Lawrence & Austen Faggen	November 8, 2021	5.31
Calvin meets ex-NFL star Jerome Bettis in a restaurant, and later learns that Bettis and Tina had a summer fling when they were both very young. Calvin becomes worried that Tina feels like she could have done better than him. Meanwhile, Gemma is shocked to learn that Dave lied about the number of women he slept with before he met her. Also, Marty's math-based poker strategy backfires, as he goes broke playing with Malcolm and some friends.
69	8	"Welcome to the Family Business"	Juanesta C. "Winnie" Holmes	Hari Ziyad	November 29, 2021	5.03
With Tina running her new cupcake business and selling custom paint jobs for Calvin's Pit Stop, her job as shop manager becomes compromised, leading to a costly error. Calvin has no choice but to fire Tina as his shop manager. He later says he did it because he has full confidence that Tina's business will flourish, and she won't need her manager job. Meanwhile, Malcolm and Dave are managing Grover's baseball team, and discover that Malcolm's girlfriend Ariel has a son who excels at baseball. Later realizing he and Ariel have nothing in common, Malcolm wants to break up, causing Dave to beg him to stay with Ariel until the season is over.
70	9	"Welcome to the Splurge"	Ron Moseley	Danny Warren	December 6, 2021	5.32
The usually frugal Calvin decides to buy an expensive jacket, but then becomes too worried about ruining it to ever wear it outside the house. Meanwhile, Dave and Gemma connect with a couple who have a daughter about Grover's age, but the couple's hands-off parenting style and out-of-control child make Dave and Gemma rethink their decision to be friends.
71	10	"Welcome to Jury Duty"	Robbie Countryman	Michael Carrington	January 3, 2022	5.45
Calvin and Dave both get jury summons, and wind up serving on the same case. Calvin initially tries to do all he can to get disqualified, but later becomes interested in solving the case. Meanwhile, Malcolm and Marty give up their home to an independent film crew for a few days. Marty meets the lead actress and is taken by her interest in comic books and science fiction. However, his opinions on dating her change when he learns the crew is shooting a pornographic movie.
72	11	"Welcome to the Knockout"	Marian Deaton	Terrell Lawrence & Austen Faggen	January 17, 2022	5.78
As he turns 40, Dave is determined to get back into shape. Tina and Gemma invite Dave, Calvin, Malcolm and Marty to join their gym, even though the girls spend more time at the juice bar than working out. Dave schedules a boxing match with what he thinks is a middle aged man like himself, only to learn it is the man's vicious son. Meanwhile, Marty meets a female boxer named Necie and becomes attracted to her, only to turn her off by trying to act like a tough guy.
73	12	"Welcome to the Big One"	Phill Lewis	Camilla Cordelia Rubis & Molly Haldeman	January 24, 2022	6.39
The Butlers and Johnsons treat a recent earthquake in different ways. While Calvin and Tina treat it as a common occurrence and no big deal, Dave goes to extremes to protect his family and home. The Butlers soon learn their house was damaged and requires several weeks to repair, forcing them to move in with Malcolm and Marty.
74	13	"Welcome to the Stakeout"	Morenike Joela Evans	Jess Pineda & Devanshi Patel	February 28, 2022	5.70
After someone keeps stealing parts from his shop, Calvin enlists Dave's help to catch the culprit in the act. They soon learn the thief is a young Hispanic woman who is trying to restore her late father's classic car. Seeing that she has intimate knowledge of cars and car repairs, Calvin offers the woman a choice: get arrested or come work in his shop. Meanwhile, Gemma is reluctant to let Tina join her new age spiritual group, correctly surmising that Tina will just make fun of it. Also, Malcolm gives Marty bad advice on how to communicate with his new girlfriend.
75	14	"Welcome to the Big Little Leagues"	Eric Dean Seaton	Michael Carrington & Danny Warren	March 7, 2022	5.94
As Malcolm manages his Little League baseball team, he decides to add Calvin as a coach. However, the two have very different views on how to treat the kids on the team, with Calvin unwilling to accept Malcolm placing "having fun" over winning. Meanwhile, Tina sells her cupcakes in the stands and gets in the face of a customer who wiped off the frosting before eating his treat. She later learns the man is a food critic for a local newspaper.
76	15	"Welcome to the Remodel"	Victor Gonzalez	Chris Moore	March 14, 2022	5.80
With their home remodel complete, the Butlers boast several "luxury" amenities they never had before, causing some friends and neighbors to treat them differently. Meanwhile, Dave's first attempt at having the "sex talk" with Grover doesn't go so well.
77	16	"Welcome to the Man Code"	Kelly Park	Ralph Greene & Hari Ziyad	March 21, 2022	5.74
Calvin discovers his friend is having an affair and is torn between his loyalty to his friend and doing the right thing. Meanwhile, Dave becomes paranoid when Gemma gets close to the school football coach, and enlists Malcolm and Marty's help when he accidentally locks her phone whilst snooping through it.
78	17	"Welcome to Bro Money, Bro Problems"	Victor Gonzalez	Meg DeLoatch	March 28, 2022	5.42
Calvin's rich younger brother, Curtis (Tracy Morgan) comes to visit and hands his money around to everyone, including buying an expensive bag for Tina that Calvin was planning to buy her for their anniversary. An angry Calvin tries to teach his brother that money cannot buy respect. Meanwhile, Dave and Gemma have trouble cleaning old things out their house. When they can't throw anything away, Dave comes up with a solution to surprise Gemma.
79	18	"Welcome to the Feud"	James Widdoes	Malik S. & Sa'Rah L. Jones	April 18, 2022	5.37
Dave is hired to mediate a long-term feud between two wealthy brothers (Phil Morris and Tommy Davidson). He turns to Calvin for assistance, but Calvin's help is ineffective. Meanwhile, Gemma seeks advice from Tina when she notices Grover has a crush on a girl at school.
80	19	"Welcome to the Quinceañera"	Kim Wayans	Samantha Silver	May 2, 2022	5.47
Calvin wants to throw a party for his new employee, Yoli, who is turning 16. After learning she missed her quinceañera when her father was deported a year ago, Calvin and Tina suggest a make-up event. Meanwhile, Dave learns his carpool buddy is the head baseball coach at USC and is looking to hire a new hitting coach. Dave gets Malcolm to interview, but Malcolm's disagreements with the coach's lineup strategy threaten his chances of being hired.
81	20	"Welcome to the Mama Drama"	Victor Gonzalez	Dan Cross & Dave Hoge	May 9, 2022	5.48
Calvin's hyper-critical and self-absorbed mother, Marilyn (Patti LaBelle), pays a visit to see him accept his Businessman of the Year award. As Calvin suspected, Marilyn, a past winner of the award, makes the event all about herself. After much tension, Tina gets mother and son to talk things out, leading Calvin to realize he's more like his mother than he'd care to admit. Meanwhile, Gemma attempts to get her school to teach about the Elaine massacre, but finds several parents feel their kids aren't ready to learn the ugly parts of American history, so she holds a meeting and unfortunately the parents vote no on teaching about the massacre. However, Grover and his classmates reveal they want to learn about their entire history, and soon the parents decide their children have a point, much to Gemma's happiness.
82	21	"Welcome to the Dream Girls"	Cedric the Entertainer	Camilla Cordelia Rubis & Molly Haldeman	May 16, 2022	5.50
Tina reunites with her former singing trio, but when group member Nicki (Shanola Hampton) sleeps with Malcolm, it threatens the group's upcoming show. Malcolm assures Tina that neither party knew who the other was, but the incident still leads to Tina and Nicki bickering about who broke up the band. Tina ultimately swallows her pride, and the show goes on as planned. Elsewhere, a clean-and-sober Crackhead Victor returns to working at the barbershop, but he clearly left behind his haircutting skills.
83	22	"Welcome to the Ring"	Victor Gonzalez	Dan Cross & David Hoge	May 23, 2022	5.91
Marty plans a surprise marriage proposal for Necie, but because she comes from a Nigerian family, the Butlers hire Chika (Gina Yashere) to ensure the proposal is in line with Nigerian tradition. One of the many dowry items Chika requests that the Butlers purchase for Necie's family is a goat, which ends up destroying most of the other items before Necie arrives. Meanwhile, watching Marty choose a wedding ring for Necie reminds Dave that Gemma is still wearing the tiny ring he purchased for her when they had little money. He surprises Gemma with a much larger ring, only to be surprised himself when Gemma pines for the old one.

=== Season 5 (2022–23) ===
No. overall	No. in season	Title	Directed by	Written by	Original release date	U.S. viewers (millions)
84	1	"Welcome Back to the Neighborhood"	Victor Gonzalez	Mike Schiff	September 19, 2022	4.76
When Dave converts the Johnson house to solar power, the technician from the power company accidentally removes the entire neighborhood from the grid instead of just Dave's home. This leaves the Johnsons as the only family with power. While neighbors are initially angry, they come together to help each other through the power outage and turn it into a neighborhood party. Meanwhile, Tina is angry that Marty is joining his fiancee Necie in a healthier diet and refuses to eat his mother's meals anymore. Also, Malcolm keeps accidentally revealing things that people told him in confidence.
85	2	"Welcome to the Pit Stop How May I Help You"	Victor Gonzalez	Bill Martin	September 26, 2022	4.99
With business slowing down at the auto shop, Dave gets Calvin to embrace Yelp. Dave offers to write Calvin's first five-star Yelp review, but Calvin is taken aback when Dave's mostly-positive review alludes to the owner's "prickly" exterior. Calvin takes Dave's advice to start being friendlier to customers, but it backfires because it isn't genuine. Elsewhere, Malcolm and Marty head out to a bar to spend some time together, given Necie is out of town. Marty is floored by the number of women hitting on him, which never happened before he was engaged. Malcolm owes it to Marty no longer giving off a desperation vibe. Meanwhile, Gemma convinces Tina to work at Walcott as a part-time music teacher. However, Gemma gets uncomfortable when Tina starts bluntly commenting about the kids' singing to their faces.
86	3	"Welcome to the Ballgame"	Victor Gonzalez	Howard Jordan, Jr.	October 3, 2022	5.46
Through his connections at USC, Malcolm is able to get five tickets to a Dodgers game. After inviting Calvin, Dave and Grover, Malcolm then invites Gemma. This upsets Dave, who was hoping for a father-son bonding moment. Gemma insists she won't act like a mom at the game, which ends up ruining the game for Dave anyway. Malcolm spots a woman in a nearby seat that he once hooked up with then ghosted, making him spend the whole game trying to not be seen. At home, Marty, Necie and Tina are making wedding preparations when Marty invites them to watch the original Star Wars trilogy. When the women quickly lose interest in the movie, Marty gets upset, causing Necie to try and get to the bottom of it.
87	4	"Welcome to the New Deal"	Victor Gonzalez	Teri Schaffer	October 10, 2022	5.00
Trying to increase business at the shop, Calvin puts a coupon in the local Pennysaver for a "4 for 40" deal (oil change, tire rotation, car wash and a handshake for $40). However, the shop becomes overwhelmed with customers wanting the 4 for 40 deal and nothing else. Calvin realizes part of the problem with the shop is he can't focus enough on fixing cars with having to do all the office work that Tina used to do. At the same time, Tina has grown tired of making cupcakes, and would welcome returning to the shop if Calvin would only ask. Meanwhile, Dave is trying to build up the counseling hours he needs to qualify for a therapist's license, and he targets both Calvin and Gemma.
88	5	"Welcome to the Art of Negotiation"	Victor Gonzalez	Antonia F. March & Jacqueline McKinley	October 17, 2022	5.51
When Calvin hears that Dave got a promotion at his VA job but it doesn't come with a raise, he instructs Dave on how to use the "walk away" technique to negotiate the pay hike. However, Dave's boss Gregory (John Ross Bowie) just lets him walk, causing Calvin to try and make things right. Meanwhile, Tina, now a part-time music teacher at Gemma's school, hears fellow teachers mocking Gemma behind her back and wonders if she should share it with her friend.
89	6	"Welcome to the Hot Prospect"	Victor Gonzalez	Don D. Scott	October 24, 2022	5.76
When Calvin meets Kenny, a potential service contract customer who has a fleet of cars, Kenny mentions his son Peter (Issac Ryan Brown) loves baseball. Calvin quickly notes that Malcolm is the hitting coach for USC and lines up a lesson for Peter, hoping it will seal the deal. Although Peter has some baseball skills, a visit from Marty makes it clear that he's more interested in a science career. Meanwhile, Gemma is distraught over a pending visit from Linzie, an old acquaintance from Michigan whom Gemma defeated in a pageant by using deception. However, the tables are turned when Tina notices Linzie trying to seduce Dave.
90	7	"Welcome to the Working Week"	Marian Deaton	Malik S.	November 14, 2022	5.24
When Calvin hires Grover to work part time at his business, he soon realizes the preteen is not a good fit. Meanwhile Marty and Necie reconsider their living situation.
91	8	"Welcome to What Used to be the Neighborhood"	Robbie Countryman	Chris Kelly	November 21, 2022	5.66
When Calvin finds out that one of his favorite spots "Elmo's" closes and is changed to a pet spa, Calvin encourages everyone to save more local businesses, banning everyone from shopping online. He and Dave attempt to save Mr. Friendly's Bargain Mart, which they are successful. However, after a video of Mr. Friendly's cat coming in contact with the lunch meats goes viral, Mr. Friendly (Brian George) is forced to close down by the health department regardless. The no online shopping policy causes Gemma to hide packages from Dave and delivering them to Malcolm and Marty's house. Meanwhile Tina helps Necie make lasagna for Marty although Tina does all the work herself.
92	9	"Welcome to Our Time"	Kim Wayans	Charles Brottmiller	December 5, 2022	5.21
When real estate agent Jake Walker gives an offer to sell Calvin's Pit Stop, Calvin is hesitant to accept the offer. But after a long conversation with Tina about the future of the shop and the money with the offer, Calvin's accepts the offer and decides to sell the shop. Meanwhile Marty discovers a sweater in the laundry and fears it's from one of Necie's ex's. After Malcolm realizes it was from one of his friends, Dave is worried that a jersey that Gemma got from her ex's meant something deeper. Gemma only likes the jersey for comfort and nothing else.
93	10	"Welcome to the Getaway"	Mark Cendrowski	Carly Hallam Tosh	January 16, 2023	5.23
94	11	"Welcome to the Cornhole"	Mark Cendrowski	Alyssa Litman	January 23, 2023	6.41
As Calvin is trying to adjust to life without working in the shop, Tina sends him to Ernie's where he discovers he is hosting a corn hole tournament. With Gemma by his side coaching him he eventually wins the tournament but doesn't want to keep playing because it's not his passion. Meanwhile Marty wants to invite Malcolm to be his best man at the wedding but wants to do it in a certain way as he dresses up as one of the characters from one of the shows he watches. Malcolm accepts the invite as one of the characters from the show and they both invite Dave as well.
95	12	"Welcome to the Bachelor Party"	Rebecca Ancheta Blum	Aaron Izek	February 6, 2023	6.29
96	13	"Welcome to the Last Dance"	Mark Cendrowski	Jay Phillips	February 13, 2023	6.20
97	14	"Welcome to New Beginnings"	Mark Cendrowski	Jacob Brown	February 27, 2023	6.11
98	15	"Welcome to the Next Big Thing"	Phill Lewis	Bill Martin	March 13, 2023	5.53
99	16	"Welcome to the Jungle"	Mark Cendrowski	Mike Schiff	March 20, 2023	5.68
100	17	"Welcome to the Milestone"	Cedric the Entertainer	Jacqueline McKinley & Antonia F. March	April 10, 2023	5.07
Calvin struggles to find the perfect birthday gift for Tina as he has a bad history with gifts. Gemma works a connection to actor Jerry O'Connell, whose kids attend Walcott Academy, to secure VIP tickets to "The Talk" for her school's fundraiser.
101	18	"Welcome to the Future"	Mark Cendrowski	Carolyn Portner	April 17, 2023	4.84
102	19	"Welcome to the New Do"	Kelly Park	Teri Schaffer	May 1, 2023	5.04
103	20	"Welcome to the Other Neighborhood"	Kelly Park	Howard Jordan, Jr. & Chris Kelly	May 8, 2023	4.73
Calvin and Marty get ready for the grand opening of their new EV repair store, "Fuse Box", in nearby Boyle Heights. However, the two are surprised when their business sparks protests over gentrification from the residents, led by Luis (Gabriel Iglesias). Calvin and Marty eventually compromise with the residents, hiring those who lost their businesses to work at Fuse Box. Meanwhile, Grover's family tree project reveals new details about Dave's father, who had left him at a young age.
104	21	"Welcome to the Fatherhood"	Eric Dean Seaton	Charles Brottmiller & Don D. Scott	May 15, 2023	4.92
Dave is upset that his dad, Lamar, hasn’t reached out after he accepted his friend request on Facebook. To everyone’s surprise, Lamar (Kevin Pollak) shows up in person. After talking with Calvin and Tina, Lamar reunites with Dave, and they reminisce. The reunion sours when Tina’s envelope of school play ticket money goes missing, and Calvin accuses Lamar of stealing it. Dave angrily kicks Lamar out, only to later learn Malcolm had secured the money. Dave and Calvin rush to apologize to Lamar, agreeing to work on rebuilding trust. Meanwhile, Marty struggles to fire underperforming Fuse Box employee Reynard, ultimately exploding in frustration and repeatedly telling him he’s fired.
105	22	"Welcome to the Opening Night"	Ron Moseley	Malik S.	May 22, 2023	5.22

=== Season 6 (2024) ===
No. overall	No. in season	Title	Directed by	Written by	Original release date	U.S. viewers (millions)
106	1	"Welcome to the Foos Box"	Victor Gonzalez	Bill Martin & Mike Schiff	February 12, 2024	5.79
As Fuse Box is officially open, Calvin and Marty butt heads over their different management styles: Marty is more carefree and acts like more of a friend to the employees rather than a manager, and Calvin disapproves because he thinks the employees have too much freedom. Calvin also notices one employee, Courtney, frequently calls Marty "nerd". Marty, who had known Courtney from working at JPL, reassures Calvin, but also confesses that he had slept with her before hiring her at Fuse Box. Tina realizes Courtney is pregnant, having a sixth sense for finding out pregnancies.
107	2	"Welcome to the Awkward Conversations"	Mark Cendrowski	Teleplay by : Teri Schaffer; Story by : Teri Schaffer & Raynelle Swilling	February 19, 2024	5.08
108	3	"Welcome to the Other Butlers"	Mark Cendrowski	Antonia F. March & Jacqueline McKinley	February 26, 2024	5.18
109	4	"Welcome to Grandfatherhood"	Kelly Park	Don D. Scott	March 11, 2024	4.80
110	5	"Welcome to the Front Window"	Kelly Park	Malik S.	March 25, 2024	4.74
Calvin is still recovering from his knee injury at home, and Dave gifts him a pair of binoculars so he could go bird-watching. However, Calvin decides to use to spy on the other neighbors. He notices one neighbor taking in a lot of groceries and a karaoke machine. He fears that it could be a "AirBnB party house", and continues spying on the neighbor. With Dave, Malcolm and Marty's help, he learns the neighbor's name: Simon Throckmorton; they also learn that all the socials for Throckmorton were made the day he moved in. Gemma and Dave get involved when Gemma sees that the neighbor resembled Salvatore Moltisanti, a hitman from a true crime documentary she and Dave watched about a mob murder. When the family see Throckmorton seemingly dragging a body outside, they confront him and call the police. They learn "Throckmorton" was actually Guiseppe Zabarino, a key witness in the trial which was featured in the documentary Gemma and Dave watched. The house he had moved in was a safe house. Since Calvin had exposed everything, Throckmorton has to move away again.
111	6	"Welcome to the Walkout"	Kelly Park	Howard Jordan, Jr.	April 1, 2024	4.44
112	7	"Welcome to the Stand-Off"	Robbie Countryman	Chris Kelly & Jay Phillips	April 15, 2024	4.42
113	8	"Welcome to the Baby Shower"	Victor Gonzalez	Aaron Izek & Alyssa Litman	April 22, 2024	4.34
114	9	"Welcome to the Name Drop"	Mark Cendrowski	Charles Brottmiller & Jacob Brown	April 29, 2024	4.76
115	10	"Welcome to the World"	Victor Gonzalez	Bill Martin & Mike Schiff	May 6, 2024	4.99

=== Season 7 (2024–25) ===
No. overall	No. in season	Title	Directed by	Written by	Original release date	U.S. viewers (millions)
116	1	"Welcome to the Neighborhood, Daphne"	Victor Gonzalez	Antonia F. March & Jacqueline McKinley	October 21, 2024	4.43
117	2	"Welcome to the Big Sleep"	Robbie Countryman	Howard Jordan, Jr.	October 28, 2024	3.99
118	3	"Welcome to the Vote"	Robbie Countryman	Chris Kelly	November 4, 2024	4.07
119	4	"Welcome to the Great Beyond"	Robbie Countryman	Malik S.	November 11, 2024	4.23
120	5	"Welcome to Commitment"	Mark Cendrowski	Charles Brottmiller	November 25, 2024	3.89
121	6	"Welcome to Daddy Issues"	Victor Gonzalez	Don D. Scott	December 2, 2024	4.01
122	7	"Welcome to the Wicked Stepmother"	Victor Gonzalez	Jay Phillips	December 9, 2024	3.70
123	8	"Bienvenidos a Nosotros"	Victor Gonzalez	Teri Schaffer	December 16, 2024	4.16
124	9	"Welcome to Pickleball"	Ron Moseley	Aaron Izek	January 27, 2025	4.66
125	10	"Welcome to the Pickle"	Donna Parish	Alyssa Litman	February 3, 2025	4.36
126	11	"Welcome to the e-Neighborhood"	Chris Poulos	Jacob Brown	February 10, 2025	4.54
127	12	"Welcome to Getting Lucky"	Tichina Arnold	Bill Martin & Mike Schiff	February 24, 2025	4.43
128	13	"Welcome to Not Being in It"	Victor Gonzalez	Teleplay by : Don D. Scott & Alyssa Litman; Story by : Malik S.	March 3, 2025	4.39
129	14	"Welcome to the Blowout"	Jude Weng	Teleplay by : Charlie Brottmiller & Aaron Izek; Story by : Howard Jordan, Jr.	March 24, 2025	4.22
130	15	"Welcome to the Signature Service Loyalty Rewards Program"	Robbie Countryman	Andrew Zuber	March 31, 2025	4.11
131	16	"Welcome to the Sting"	Victor Gonzalez	Bill Martin & Mike Schiff	April 14, 2025	3.88
132	17	"Welcome to Your Own Medicine"	Cedric the Entertainer	Marc Brockwell & Matthew Keith	April 21, 2025	4.05
133	18	"Welcome to the Yippedy-Dip"	Kelly Park	Teleplay by : Teri Schaffer & Jay Phillips; Story by : Chris Kelly	April 28, 2025	3.99
134	19	"Welcome to Pomp and Circumstance"	Kelly Park	Antonia F. March & Jacqueline McKinley	May 5, 2025	4.14
135	20	"Welcome to Venice"	Victor Gonzalez	Teleplay by : Bill Martin & Mike Schiff; Story by : Cedric the Entertainer & Bill Martin & Mike Schiff	May 5, 2025	4.14

=== Season 8 (2025–26) ===
No. overall	No. in season	Title	Directed by	Written by	Original release date	U.S. viewers (millions)
136	1	"Welcome to the New Normals"	Victor Gonzalez	Mike Schiff	October 13, 2025	3.85
137	2	"Welcome to the Downsizing"	Victor Gonzalez	Bill Martin	October 20, 2025	3.68
138	3	"Welcome to Spades"	Robbie Countryman	Don D. Scott	October 27, 2025	3.39
139	4	"Welcome to Family Value"	Robbie Countryman	Malik S.	November 3, 2025	3.92
This episode leads to the spin-off series Crutch. Tina notes how Crutch resembles Curtis, who appeared in "Welcome to Bro Money, Bro Problems".
140	5	"Welcome to New Horizons"	Victor Gonzalez	Antonia F. March & Jacqueline McKinley	November 10, 2025	3.72
141	6	"Welcome to the Walk of Roses"	Victor Gonzalez	Chris Kelly	November 17, 2025	3.74
When Calvin receives an award, he is surprised for the honor. Malcolm meets his celebrity client.
142	7	"Welcome to Babies and Bathwater"	Robbie Countryman	Aaron Izek	December 1, 2025	N/A
When Dave buys a bathtub, he needs Calvin's help putting it together. Malcolm seeks Gemma's help to overcome writing sex scenes; Tina's suggestion for clothes for Daphne sparks a parenting dilemma for Courtney.
143	8	"Welcome to Secrets and Santa"	Kelly Park	Alyssa Litman	December 8, 2025	N/A
The Butlers' anniversary plans take an unexpected turn when a blast from the past resurfaces; Malcolm's meeting with Mercedes is hijacked; Marty makes a big move toward commitment; Gemma finds herself caught in a holiday misunderstanding.
144	9	"Welcome to the Zhuzh"	Kim Fields	Jay Phillips	February 23, 2026	N/A
145	10	"Welcome to the Hoodwink"	Chris Poulos	Jacob Brown	March 2, 2026	N/A
146	11	"Welcome to The Baby Proofing"	Robbie Countryman	Charlie Brottmiller	March 9, 2026	N/A
147	12	"Welcome to Murder at Sea"	Ron Moseley	Antonia F. March & Jacqueline McKinley	March 16, 2026	N/A
148	13	"Welcome to the Two-Ring Circus"	Victor Gonzalez	Marc Brockwell & Matthew Keith	March 23, 2026	N/A
149	14	"Welcome to the Things We Do for Love"	Ron Moseley	Andrew Zuber	March 30, 2026	N/A
150	15	"Welcome to Gemma Johnson's Day Off"	Tichina Arnold	Chris Kelly & Jacob Brown	April 6, 2026	N/A
151	16	"Welcome to the Breaking Point"	Victor Gonzalez	Aaron Izek & Alyssa Litman	April 13, 2026	N/A
152	17	"Welcome to the Purse Dog"	Donna Parish	Bill Martin & Mike Schiff	April 20, 2026	N/A
153	18	"Welcome to the Chat"	Jude Weng	Charles Brottmiller & Jay Phillips	April 27, 2026	N/A
154	19	"Welcome to Kalamazoo?"	Cedric the Entertainer	Antonia F. March & Jacqueline McKinley	May 4, 2026	N/A
155	20	"Welcome to Goodbye"	Victor Gonzalez	Don D. Scott & Malik S.	May 11, 2026	N/A

== Ratings ==
=== Season 1 ===
Viewership and ratings per episode of List of The Neighborhood episodes
No.	Title	Air date	Rating/share (18–49)	Viewers (millions)	DVR (18–49)	DVR viewers (millions)	Total (18–49)	Total viewers (millions)
1	"Pilot"	October 1, 2018	1.3/6	8.10	0.5	1.98	1.8	10.08
2	"Welcome to the Repipe"	October 8, 2018	1.1/5	6.43	0.5	1.64	1.6	7.99
3	"Welcome to the Spare Key"	October 15, 2018	1.1/5	6.33	0.5	1.51	1.6	7.85
4	"Welcome to the Housewarming"	October 22, 2018	1.1/5	6.37	0.5	1.39	1.6	7.76
5	"Welcome to Game Night"	October 29, 2018	1.1/5	6.10	0.5	1.41	1.6	7.52
6	"Welcome to the Anniversary"	November 5, 2018	1.0/4	5.70	0.4	1.48	1.4	7.19
7	"Welcome to the Barbershop"	November 12, 2018	1.1/5	6.14	0.4	1.34	1.5	7.48
8	"Welcome to Thanksgiving"	November 19, 2018	1.1/5	6.47	0.5	1.63	1.6	8.08
9	"Welcome to the Dinner Guest"	December 3, 2018	1.0/5	6.50	0.5	1.47	1.5	7.97
10	"Welcome to the Stolen Sneakers"	December 10, 2018	1.1/5	6.07	0.5	1.60	1.6	7.68
11	"Welcome to the Fundraiser"	December 17, 2018	1.0/5	6.08	0.5	1.61	1.5	7.69
12	"Welcome to Grover's Birthday"	January 14, 2019	1.3/6	6.82	0.4	1.41	1.7	8.24
13	"Welcome to Fight Night"	February 4, 2019	1.4/6	7.53	0.4	1.52	1.8	9.09
14	"Welcome to the Yard Sale"	February 11, 2019	1.3/6	7.04	0.4	1.47	1.7	8.51
15	"Welcome to Malcolm's Job"	February 18, 2019	1.1/5	6.45	0.4	1.38	1.5	7.83
16	"Welcome to the Big Payback"	February 25, 2019	1.2/6	7.06	0.3	1.31	1.5	8.38
17	"Welcome to the Climb"	March 11, 2019	1.0/5	6.43	0.4	1.47	1.4	7.90
18	"Welcome to Logan #2"	March 25, 2019	1.0/5	6.34	0.4	1.47	1.4	7.82
19	"Welcome to the Camping Trip"	April 1, 2019	1.0/5	6.14	0.4	1.47	1.4	7.61
20	"Welcome to the Repass"	April 15, 2019	1.0/5	5.75	0.4	1.57	1.4	7.32
21	"Welcome to the Conversation"	April 22, 2019	1.0/5	6.27	0.5	1.49	1.5	7.76

=== Season 2 ===
Viewership and ratings per episode of List of The Neighborhood episodes
No.	Title	Air date	Rating/share (18–49)	Viewers (millions)	DVR (18–49)	DVR viewers (millions)	Total (18–49)	Total viewers (millions)
1	"Welcome to the Re-Rack"	September 23, 2019	0.9/5	5.70	0.4	1.46	1.3	7.16
2	"Welcome to the Bully"	September 30, 2019	0.9/5	5.87	0.4	1.30	1.3	7.17
3	"Welcome to the Fresh Coat"	October 7, 2019	0.8/4	5.58	0.4	1.28	1.2	6.87
4	"Welcome to Co-Habitation"	October 14, 2019	0.8/4	5.29	0.4	1.28	1.2	6.58
5	"Welcome to Soul Food"	October 21, 2019	0.9/4	5.67	0.4	1.37	1.3	7.09
6	"Welcome to the Wagon"	October 28, 2019	0.9/5	5.75	0.4	1.37	1.3	7.13
7	"Welcome to the Vow Renewal"	November 4, 2019	0.9/4	5.86	0.3	1.40	1.2	7.26
8	"Welcome to Bowling"	November 18, 2019	1.0/5	6.49	—N/a	1.25	—N/a	7.74
9	"Welcome to the Dealbreaker"	November 25, 2019	0.7/4	5.92	0.5	1.60	1.2	7.53
10	"Welcome to the Digital Divide"	December 9, 2019	0.9/4	6.13	0.3	1.38	1.2	7.52
11	"Welcome to the Scooter"	December 16, 2019	0.9/4	6.45	0.3	1.47	1.2	7.92
12	"Welcome to the Freeloader"	January 6, 2020	0.9/5	6.86	0.4	1.41	1.3	8.27
13	"Welcome to the New Pastor"	January 20, 2020	0.9/4	6.81	0.4	1.47	1.3	8.28
14	"Welcome to Trivia Night"	February 3, 2020	0.8	6.22	0.4	1.48	1.2	7.72
15	"Welcome to the Bad Review"	February 10, 2020	0.9	6.40	—N/a	1.35	—N/a	7.76
16	"Welcome to the Hockey Game"	February 17, 2020	0.9	6.46	—N/a	1.48	—N/a	7.94
17	"Welcome to the Commercial"	March 9, 2020	0.9	6.23	0.3	1.49	1.2	7.72
18	"Welcome to the Team"	March 16, 2020	1.1	7.39	0.4	1.49	1.5	8.89
19	"Welcome to the Jump"	April 6, 2020	1.0	7.23	0.3	1.28	1.3	8.51
20	"Welcome to the Standoff"	April 13, 2020	1.0	7.11	—N/a	1.38	—N/a	8.49
21	"Welcome to the Speed Bump"	May 4, 2020	0.9	6.74	0.4	1.31	1.3	8.01
22	"Welcome to the Campaign"	May 4, 2020	0.9	6.55	0.3	1.56	1.2	8.11

=== Season 3 ===
Viewership and ratings per episode of List of The Neighborhood episodes
No.	Title	Air date	Rating (18–49)	Viewers (millions)	DVR (18–49)	DVR viewers (millions)	Total (18–49)	Total viewers (millions)
1	"Welcome to the Movement"	November 16, 2020	0.8	5.79	0.3	1.27	1.1	7.07
2	"Welcome to the Election"	November 23, 2020	0.8	5.46	—N/a	—N/a	—N/a	—N/a
3	"Welcome to Couples Therapy"	November 30, 2020	0.8	5.52	0.3	1.27	1.1	6.79
4	"Welcome to the Rooster"	December 7, 2020	0.7	5.27	0.3	1.22	1.0	6.50
5	"Welcome to the Road Trip"	December 14, 2020	0.6	5.26	—N/a	—N/a	—N/a	—N/a
6	"Welcome to the Turnaround"	January 4, 2021	0.8	6.20	0.3	1.35	1.1	7.56
7	"Welcome to the Motorcycle"	January 18, 2021	0.8	6.09	0.3	1.11	1.1	7.20 (Note: Live+7 ratings were unavailable, so Live+3 ratings have been used instead.)
8	"Welcome to the Property"	January 25, 2021	1.0	6.41	—N/a	—N/a	—N/a	—N/a
9	"Welcome to the Shakedown"	February 8, 2021	1.0	6.06	0.3	1.16	1.3	7.23
10	"Welcome to the Procedure"	February 22, 2021	0.8	5.92	0.3	1.39	1.1	7.31
11	"Welcome to the Dad Band"	March 8, 2021	0.8	5.61	—N/a	1.10	—N/a	6.71
12	"Welcome to the Treehouse"	March 15, 2021	0.7	5.39	—N/a	—N/a	—N/a	—N/a
13	"Welcome to the Art Class"	April 12, 2021	0.6	4.96	0.3	1.24	0.9	6.18
14	"Welcome to the Hero"	April 19, 2021	0.7	5.11	0.2	1.06	0.9	6.17
15	"Welcome to the Challenge"	April 26, 2021	0.6	4.89	0.3	1.16	0.9	6.05
16	"Welcome to the Test Run"	May 3, 2021	0.7	5.31	0.2	1.07	0.9	6.23
17	"Welcome to the Invasion"	May 10, 2021	0.7	5.11	0.3	1.11	0.9	6.21
18	"Welcome to the Surprise"	May 17, 2021	0.8	5.56	0.3	1.08	1.1	6.64

=== Season 4 ===
Viewership and ratings per episode of List of The Neighborhood episodes
No.	Title	Air date	Rating (18–49)	Viewers (millions)	DVR (18–49)	DVR viewers (millions)	Total (18–49)	Total viewers (millions)
1	"Welcome to the Family"	September 20, 2021	0.6	5.28	0.2	1.19	0.8	6.47
2	"Welcome to the Intervention"	September 27, 2021	0.7	5.41	0.2	0.87	0.8	6.28
3	"Welcome to the Sister from Another Mister"	October 4, 2021	0.6	5.52	0.2	1.07	0.8	6.58
4	"Welcome to the Porch Pirate"	October 11, 2021	0.6	5.37	0.2	1.26	0.9	6.63
5	"Welcome to Your Match"	October 18, 2021	0.7	5.30	0.3	1.23	0.9	6.53
6	"Welcome to the Haunting"	November 1, 2021	0.7	5.48	0.2	1.01	0.8	6.49
7	"Welcome to the Ex-Files"	November 8, 2021	0.6	5.31	0.2	0.90	0.8	6.21
8	"Welcome to the Family Business"	November 29, 2021	0.6	5.03	0.2	1.24	0.8	6.27
9	"Welcome to the Splurge"	December 6, 2021	0.6	5.32	0.2	1.16	0.8	6.49
10	"Welcome to Jury Duty"	January 3, 2022	0.5	5.45	0.2	1.14	0.8	6.60
11	"Welcome to the Knockout"	January 17, 2022	0.6	5.78	0.2	1.09	0.9	6.87
12	"Welcome to the Big One"	January 24, 2022	0.7	6.39	0.2	0.92	0.9	7.31
13	"Welcome to the Stakeout"	February 28, 2022	0.6	5.70	0.2	1.07	0.8	6.77
14	"Welcome to the Big Little Leagues"	March 7, 2022	0.6	5.94	0.2	1.23	0.8	7.20
15	"Welcome to the Remodel"	March 14, 2022	0.6	5.80	0.2	1.23	0.8	7.03
16	"Welcome to the Man Code"	March 21, 2022	0.6	5.74	0.2	1.03	0.8	6.76
17	"Welcome to Bro Money, Bro Problems"	March 28, 2022	0.6	5.42	0.2	1.17	0.8	6.59
18	"Welcome to the Feud"	April 18, 2022	0.6	5.37	0.2	1.19	0.8	6.55
19	"Welcome to the Quinceañera"	May 2, 2022	0.6	5.47	—N/a	—N/a	—N/a	—N/a
20	"Welcome to the Mama Drama"	May 9, 2022	0.6	5.48	—N/a	—N/a	—N/a	—N/a
21	"Welcome to the Dream Girls"	May 16, 2022	0.5	5.50	—N/a	—N/a	—N/a	—N/a
22	"Welcome to the Ring"	May 23, 2022	0.6	5.91	—N/a	—N/a	—N/a	—N/a

=== Season 5 ===
Viewership and ratings per episode of List of The Neighborhood episodes
No.	Title	Air date	Rating (18–49)	Viewers (millions)	DVR (18–49)	DVR viewers (millions)	Total (18–49)	Total viewers (millions)
1	"Welcome Back to the Neighborhood"	September 19, 2022	0.5	4.76	0.2	1.32	0.7	6.09
2	"Welcome to the Pit Stop How May I Help You"	September 26, 2022	0.5	4.99	0.2	1.31	0.7	6.30
3	"Welcome to the Ballgame"	October 3, 2022	0.5	5.46	0.2	1.16	0.7	6.62
4	"Welcome to the New Deal"	October 10, 2022	0.5	5.00	0.2	1.11	0.7	6.11
5	"Welcome to the Art of Negotiation"	October 17, 2022	0.6	5.51	0.2	1.10	0.8	6.61
6	"Welcome to the Hot Prospect"	October 24, 2022	0.6	5.76	0.2	1.15	0.8	6.91
7	"Welcome to the Working Week"	November 14, 2022	0.5	5.24	0.2	1.14	0.7	6.38
8	"Welcome to What Used to be the Neighborhood"	November 21, 2022	0.6	5.66	0.1	0.71	0.7	6.41
9	"Welcome to Our Time"	December 5, 2022	0.5	5.21	0.1	0.83	0.7	6.05
10	"Welcome to the Getaway"	January 16, 2023	0.4	5.23	0.2	1.14	0.6	6.37
11	"Welcome to the Cornhole"	January 23, 2023	0.7	6.61	0.1	0.83	0.8	7.24
12	"Welcome to the Bachelor Party"	February 6, 2023	0.6	6.29	—N/a	—N/a	—N/a	—N/a
13	"Welcome to the Last Dance"	February 13, 2023	0.5	6.20	—N/a	—N/a	—N/a	—N/a
14	"Welcome to New Beginnings"	February 27, 2023	0.6	6.11	—N/a	—N/a	—N/a	—N/a
15	"Welcome to the Next Big Thing"	March 13, 2023	0.5	5.53	—N/a	—N/a	—N/a	—N/a
16	"Welcome to the Jungle"	March 20, 2023	0.5	5.68	—N/a	—N/a	—N/a	—N/a
17	"Welcome to the Milestone"	April 10, 2023	0.5	5.07	—N/a	—N/a	—N/a	—N/a
18	"Welcome to the Future"	April 17, 2023	0.4	4.84	—N/a	—N/a	—N/a	—N/a
19	"Welcome to the New Do"	May 1, 2023	0.5	5.04	—N/a	—N/a	—N/a	—N/a
20	"Welcome to the Other Neighborhood"	May 8, 2023	0.4	4.73	—N/a	—N/a	—N/a	—N/a
21	"Welcome to the Fatherhood"	May 15, 2023	0.5	4.92	—N/a	—N/a	—N/a	—N/a
22	"Welcome to the Opening Night"	May 22, 2023	0.5	5.22	—N/a	—N/a	—N/a	—N/a

=== Season 6 ===
Viewership and ratings per episode of List of The Neighborhood episodes
No.	Title	Air date	Rating (18–49)	Viewers (millions)	DVR (18–49)	DVR viewers (millions)	Total (18–49)	Total viewers (millions)	Ref.
1	"Welcome to the Foos Box"	February 12, 2024	0.6	5.79	—N/a	—N/a	—N/a	—N/a	
2	"Welcome to the Awkward Conversations"	February 19, 2024	0.5	5.08	—N/a	—N/a	—N/a	—N/a	
3	"Welcome to the Other Butlers"	February 26, 2024	0.4	5.18	—N/a	—N/a	—N/a	—N/a	
4	"Welcome to Grandfatherhood"	March 11, 2024	0.4	4.80	—N/a	—N/a	—N/a	—N/a	
5	"Welcome to the Front Window"	March 25, 2024	0.5	4.74	0.1	0.94	0.6	5.69	
6	"Welcome to the Walkout"	April 1, 2024	0.4	4.44	0.1	0.85	0.5	5.09	
7	"Welcome to the Stand-Off"	April 15, 2024	0.4	4.42	0.1	0.97	0.6	5.38	
8	"Welcome to the Baby Shower"	April 22, 2024	0.3	4.34	0.1	0.86	0.5	5.19	
9	"Welcome to the Name Drop"	April 29, 2024	0.4	4.76	0.1	0.89	0.5	5.66	
10	"Welcome to the World"	May 6, 2024	0.4	4.99	0.1	0.73	0.5	5.72	

=== Season 7 ===
Viewership and ratings per episode of List of The Neighborhood episodes
No.	Title	Air date	Rating (18–49)	Viewers (millions)	DVR (18–49)	DVR viewers (millions)	Total (18–49)	Total viewers (millions)	Ref.
1	"Welcome to the Neighborhood, Daphne"	October 21, 2024	0.5	4.43	0.1	0.76	0.5	5.19	
2	"Welcome to the Big Sleep"	October 28, 2024	0.4	3.99	0.1	0.83	0.5	4.82	
3	"Welcome to the Vote"	November 4, 2024	0.4	4.07	0.1	0.79	0.5	4.87	
4	"Welcome to the Great Beyond"	November 11, 2024	0.4	4.23	0.1	0.77	0.5	5.00	
5	"Welcome to Commitment"	November 25, 2024	0.4	3.89	0.1	0.71	0.5	4.60	
6	"Welcome to Daddy Issues"	December 2, 2024	0.4	4.01	0.1	0.82	0.5	4.83	
7	"Welcome to the Wicked Stepmother"	December 9, 2024	0.3	3.70	0.1	0.78	0.4	4.48	
8	"Bienvenidos a Nosotros"	December 16, 2024	0.4	4.16	0.1	0.72	0.5	4.88	
9	"Welcome to Pickleball"	January 27, 2025	0.4	4.66	0.1	0.74	0.5	5.42	
10	"Welcome to the Pickle"	February 3, 2025	0.4	4.36	0.1	0.65	0.4	5.00	
11	"Welcome to the e-Neighborhood"	February 10, 2025	0.4	4.54	0.1	0.61	0.5	5.15	
12	"Welcome to Getting Lucky"	February 24, 2025	0.4	4.43	0.1	0.78	0.5	5.21	
13	"Welcome to Not Being in It"	March 3, 2025	0.4	4.39	0.1	0.77	0.5	5.16	
14	"Welcome to the Blowout"	March 24, 2025	0.3	4.22	0.1	0.81	0.4	5.02	
15	"Welcome to the Signature Service Loyalty Rewards Program"	March 31, 2025	0.4	4.11	TBD	TBD	TBD	TBD	
16	"Welcome to the Sting"	April 14, 2025	0.3	3.88	TBD	TBD	TBD	TBD	
17	"Welcome to Your Own Medicine"	April 21, 2025	0.4	4.05	TBD	TBD	TBD	TBD	
18	"Welcome to the Yippedy-Dip"	April 28, 2025	0.3	3.99	TBD	TBD	TBD	TBD	
19	"Welcome to Pomp and Circumstance"	May 5, 2025	0.3	4.14	TBD	TBD	TBD	TBD	
20	"Welcome to Venice"	May 5, 2025	0.3	4.14	TBD	TBD	TBD	TBD	

=== Season 8 ===
Viewership and ratings per episode of List of The Neighborhood episodes
No.	Title	Air date	Rating/share (18–49)	Viewers (millions)	DVR (18–49)	DVR viewers (millions)	Total (18–49)	Total viewers (millions)	Ref.
1	"Welcome to the New Normals"	October 13, 2025	0.3/4	3.85	0.1	0.70	0.4	4.55	
2	"Welcome to the Downsizing"	October 20, 2025	0.3/4	3.68	0.1	0.67	0.4	4.35	
3	"Welcome to Spades"	October 27, 2025	0.3/3	3.39	0.1	0.62	0.4	4.01	
4	"Welcome to Family Value"	November 3, 2025	0.4/5	3.92	0.1	0.53	0.4	4.45	
5	"Welcome to New Horizons"	November 10, 2025	0.3/4	3.72	0.1	0.63	0.4	4.35	
6	"Welcome to the Walk of Roses"	November 17, 2025	0.3/4	3.74	TBD	TBD	TBD	TBD	
